= Yosemite Airport =

Yosemite Airport may refer to:

- Fresno Yosemite International Airport in Fresno, California, United States (FAA: FAT)
- Mammoth Yosemite Airport in Mammoth Lakes, California, United States (FAA: MMH)
- Mariposa-Yosemite Airport in Mariposa, California, United States (FAA: MPI)
