= 924th Air Refueling Squadron =

924th Air Refueling Squadron

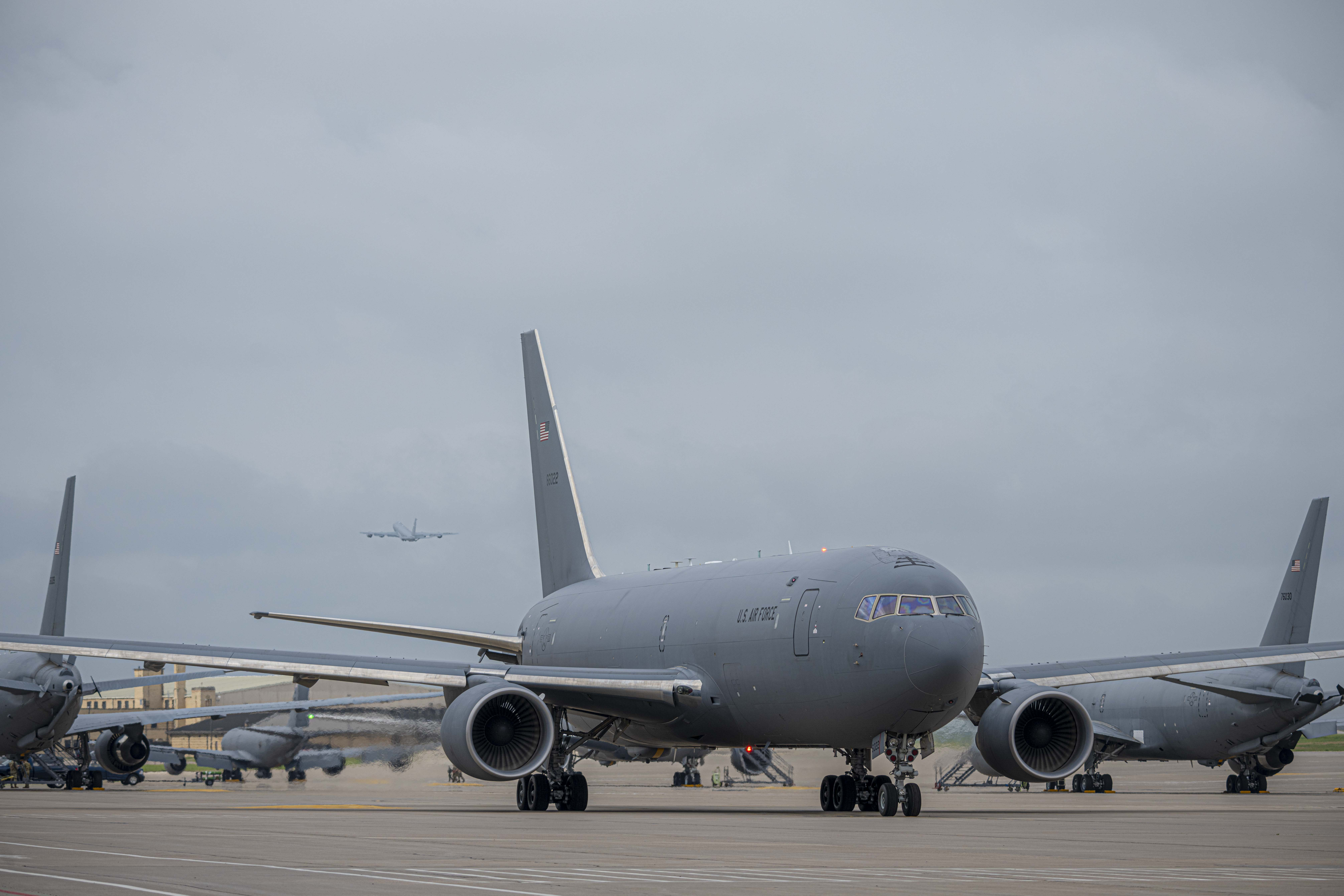
- KC-46 Pegasus aircraft at McConnell Air Force Base
- Active: 1942–1943; 1959–1992; 2017–present
- Country: United States
- Branch: United States Air Force
- Role: Air refueling
- Garrison/HQ: McConnell Air Force Base, Kansas
- Decorations: Air Force Outstanding Unit Award

Commanders
- Current commander: Lt Col Brian Correll

Insignia
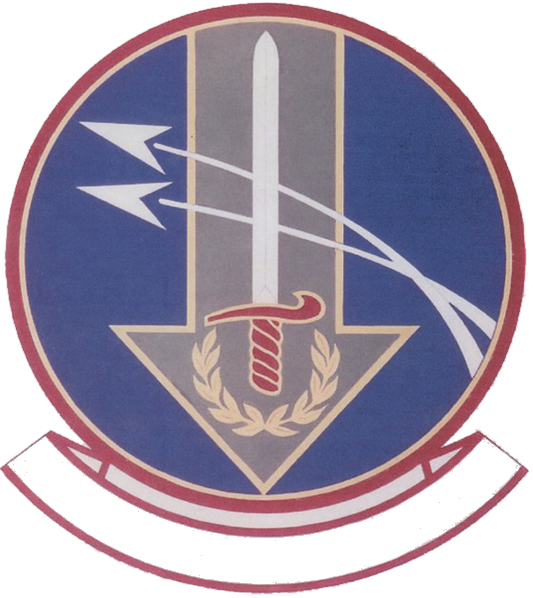
- 924th Air Refueling Squadron emblem

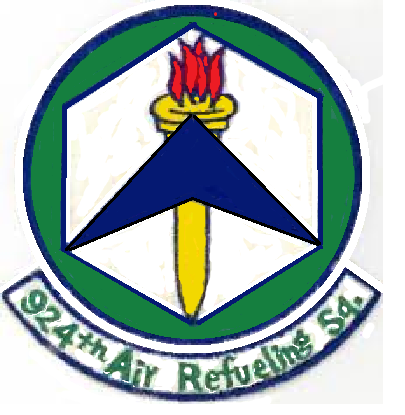
- 924th Air Refueling Squadron emblem (old)

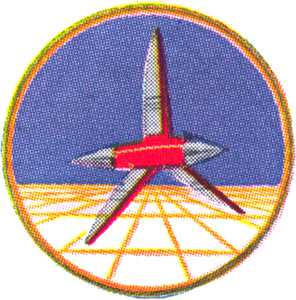
- 24th Ferrying Squadron emblem

The 924th Air Refueling Squadron is an active United States Air Force associate unit. It is assigned to the 931st Operations Group at McConnell Air Force Base, Kansas. The squadron is the first Air Force Reserve Command unit dedicated to flying the Boeing KC-46 Pegasus.

The earliest predecessor of the squadron was the 24th Transport Squadron which was activated at Morrison Field, Florida in 1942. The squadron supported the South Atlantic air ferrying route of Air Transport Command in World War II until it was disbanded in 1943.

The 924th Air Refueling Squadron was activated at Castle in 1959. Through most of its existence it served as the tactical refueling component of the 93d Bombardment Wing, while its companion 93d Air Refueling Squadron was the "schoolhouse" for Boeing KC-135 Stratotanker aircrews, although in the 1980s, these roles were reversed. In 1985 the 24th and 924th squadrons were consolidated into a single unit. The unit was inactivated in 1992, shortly before Strategic Air Command was inactivated and responsibility for the air refueling mission transferred to Air Mobility Command.

== History ==
=== World War II ===
The earliest predecessor of the squadron was the 24th Transport Squadron which was activated at Morrison Field, Florida in 1943. The squadron supported the South Atlantic ferrying route of Air Corps Ferrying Command (later Air Transport Command) as Morrison served as the western terminus of the route, processing personnel and equipment for deployment overseas. Although the squadron was stationed at Morrison, its personnel were also used to man other stations of the Caribbean Wing. After a little more than a year of trying to use traditional Table of Organization units like the 24th, Air Transport Command found them too inflexible for its operations. It, therefore, decided to replace its groups and squadrons and assign personnel directly to each of its stations, based on the needs of the station. The squadron was therefore disbanded and its personnel transferred to Station 11, Caribbean Wing, Air Transport Command.

=== Cold War ===
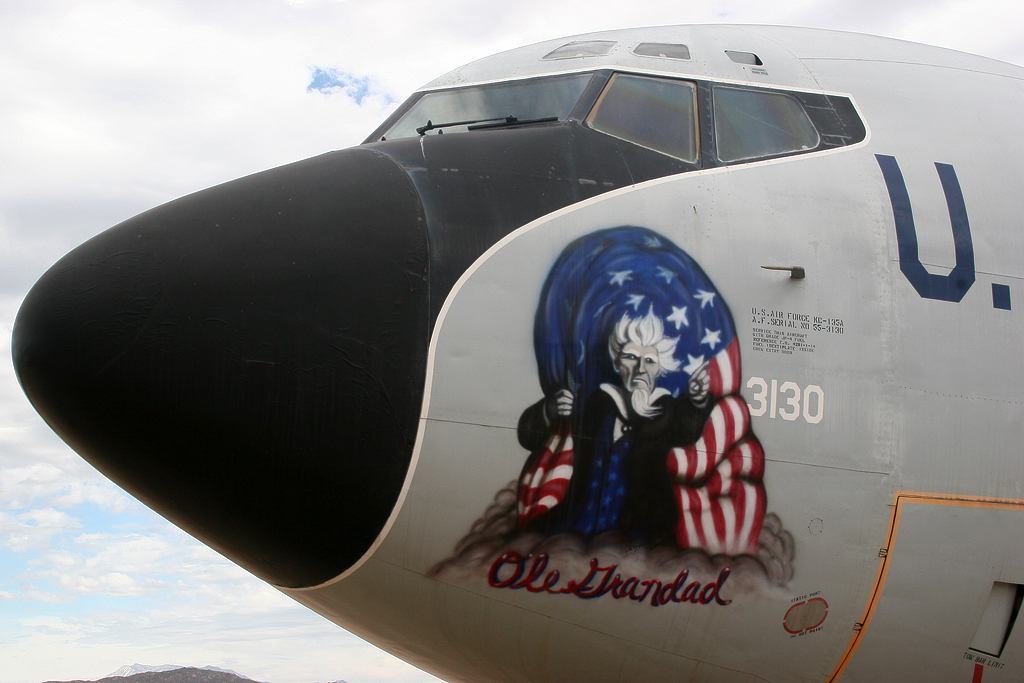
KC-135A Ole Grandad at the March Field Museum (Note: Currently a display aircraft, Boeing KC-135A-BN Stratotanker, serial 55-3130, Ole Grandad, was assigned to the 924th from September 1959 to July 1962 and continued to be flown by the squadron until September 1968. "Exhibits/Aircraft: KC-135A". March Field Air Museum. Archived from the original on 21 April 2014.)

The 924th Air Refueling Squadron was activated on 1 July 1959 by Strategic Air Command (SAC) at Castle Air Force Base and assigned to the 93d Bombardment Wing. The squadron drew its cadre from the 93d Air Refueling Squadron. It was equipped with Boeing KC-135 Stratotankers and its primary mission was to train KC-135 aircrews for SAC tanker units. It also provided air refueling to the Boeing B-52 Stratofortress strategic bombers of its parent wing as they conducted combat crew training in the "Buff" and to other USAF units as directed. The squadron also deployed aircraft and aircrews to the Pacific, European and Alaskan Tanker Task Forces.

Later, the 93d Air Refueling Squadron assumed the bulk of the tanker training mission and the squadron deployed crews and aircraft to the Western Pacific region to support combat operations during the Vietnam War. The squadron also supported the Pacific, European, and Alaskan Tanker Task Forces. During periods when the 924th was not the primary tanker training unit of the 93d wing, it kept half of the squadron's aircraft on fifteen-minute alert, fully fueled and ready for combat to reduce vulnerability to a Soviet missile strike.

In 1985 the squadron was consolidated with the World War II 24th Transport Squadron. It deployed personnel and equipment to the Middle East in 1990 as part of Operation Desert Shield, and in 1991 for combat operations during Operation Desert Storm.

The 924th had the distinction of having Strategic Air Command's first all-female crew in June 1982, named "Fair Force One". The squadron was inactivated in 1992 as part of drawdown of United States strategic forces after the end of the Cold War and in anticipation of the closure of Castle transfer of air refueling training to Altus Air Force Base, Oklahoma.

=== Reserve associate unit ===
In April 2017, the squadron was reactivated at McConnell Air Force Base, Kansas. As a reserve associate squadron, the 924th flies the Boeing KC-46 Pegasus aircraft assigned to the active duty 22d Operations Group at McConnell. The first KC-46 aircraft were delivered to McConnell in January 2019, and the 924th was the first reserve unit to fly the new tanker.

== Lineage ==
24th Transport Squadron

- Constituted as the 24th Air Corps Ferry Squadron ca. 19 February 1942

Activated on 27 April 1942
Redesignated 24th Transport Squadron on 29 March 1943

- Disbanded on 13 October 1943
- Reconstituted on 19 September 1985 and consolidated with the 924th Air Refueling Squadron as the 924th Air Refueling Squadron

924th Air Refueling Squadron

- Constituted as the 924th Air Refueling Squadron, Heavy on 20 May 1959

Activated on 1 July 1959
Redesignated 924th Air Refueling Squadron, Heavy (Training) on 2 September 1967

- Consolidated on 19 September 1985 with the 24th Transport Squadron

Redesignated 924th Air Refueling Squadron on 1 September 1991
Inactivated on 30 April 1992

- Activated c. 2 April 2017

=== Assignments ===
- South Atlantic Sector, Air Corps Ferrying Command: 27 April 1942
- 27th AAF Ferrying Wing: 19 June 1942
- 15th Ferrying Group (later 15th Transport Group): 9 July 1942 – 13 October 1943
- 93d Bombardment Wing: 1 July 1959
- 93d Operations Group: 1 September 1991 – 30 April 1992
- 931st Operations Group, c. 2 April 2017 – present

=== Stations ===
- Morrison Field, Florida, 27 April 1942 – 13 October 1943
- Castle Air Force Base, California, 1 July 1959 – 30 April 1992
- McConnell Air Force Base, Kansas, c. 2 April 2017 – present

=== Aircraft ===
- Boeing KC-135 Stratotanker, 1959–1992
- Boeing KC-46 Pegasus, after 2017

=== Awards and campaigns ===
Award streamer	Award	Dates	Notes
	Air Force Outstanding Unit Award	1 July 1963 – 31 March 1964	924th Air Refueling Squadron (Note: The Air Force Personnel Services web site gives different dates for this award.)
	Air Force Outstanding Unit Award	1 April 1973 – 30 June 1974	924th Air Refueling Squadron
	Air Force Outstanding Unit Award	1 July 1983 – 30 June 1985	924th Air Refueling Squadron
	Air Force Outstanding Unit Award	1 July 1988 – 30 June 1990	924th Air Refueling Squadron
	Air Force Outstanding Unit Award	2 August 1990 – 11 April 1991	924th Air Refueling Squadron

Service Streamer	Theater	Dates	Notes
	American Theater	27 April 1942 – 13 October 1943	24th Transport Squadron

== See also ==
- List of United States Air Force air refueling squadrons
