= Castle Air Force Base =

Former US Air Force base in California, US

- Atwater, California in the United States
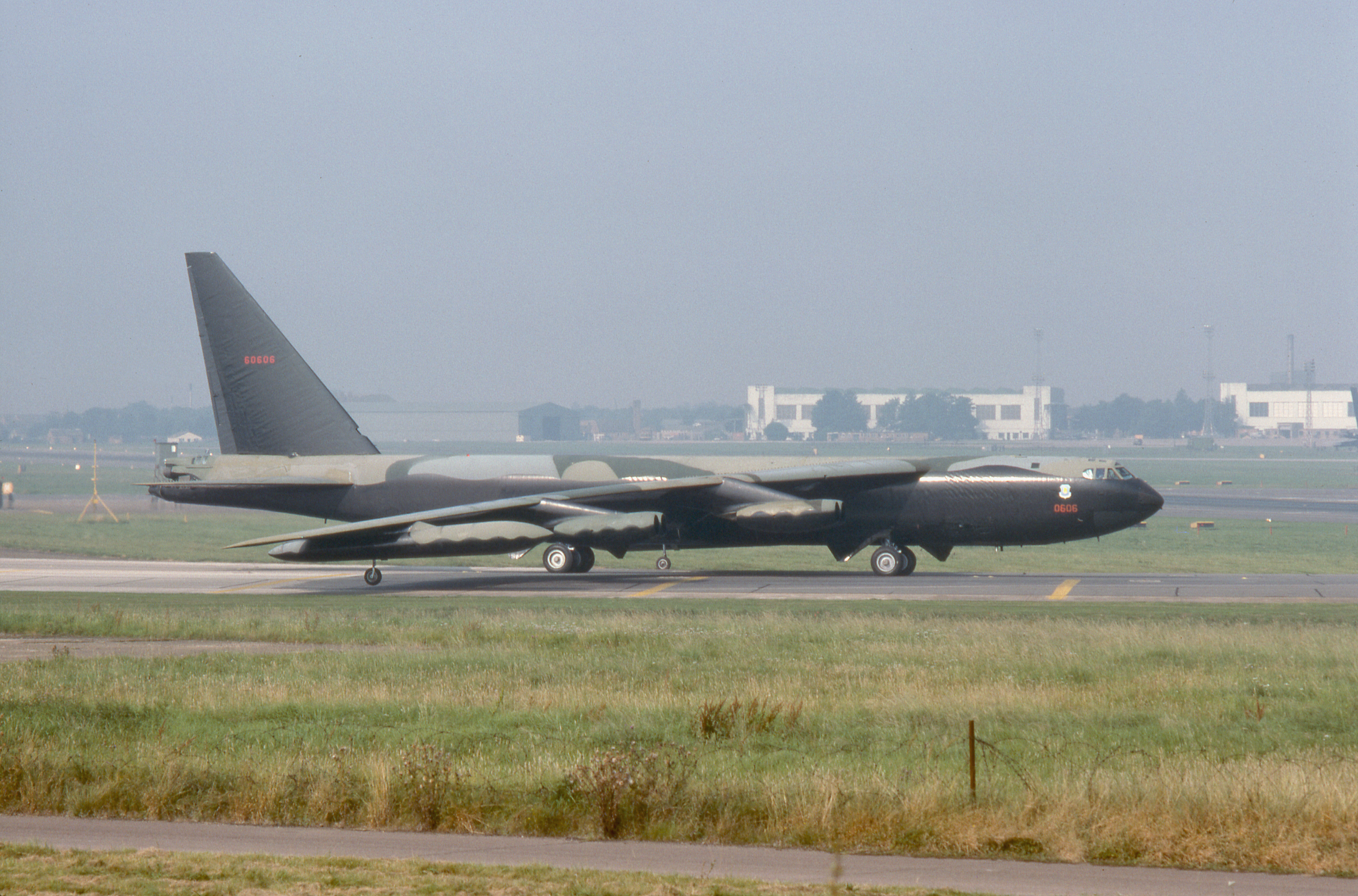
- A Boeing B-52 Stratofortress at Castle AFB in 1981, an aircraft closely associated with the base

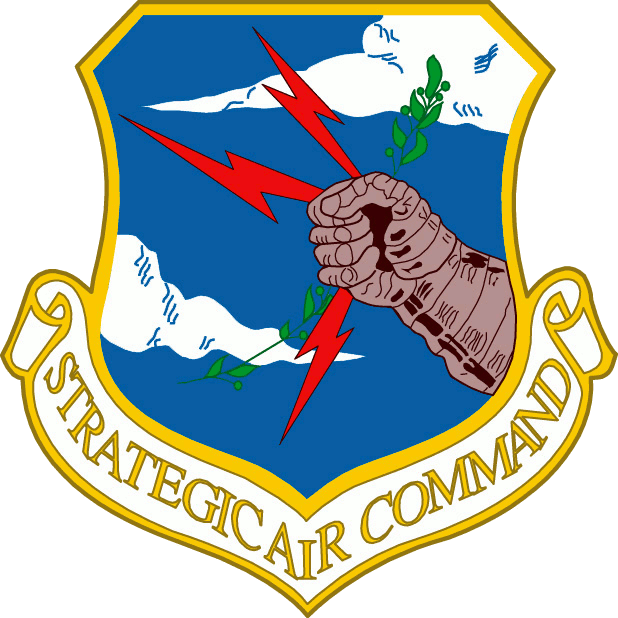

Site information
- Type: US Air Force Base
- Owner: Department of Defense
- Operator: US Air Force
- Controlled by: Strategic Air Command
- Condition: Closed

Location
- Coordinates: 37°22′50″N 120°34′05″W

Site history
- Built: 1941 (as Army Air Force Basic Flying School)
- In use: 1941–1995
- Fate: Became Castle Airport Aviation and Development Center, US Penitentiary Atwater and various commercial uses

Garrison information
- Garrison: 93d Bombardment Wing

Castle Air Force Base (Castle AFB, 1941–1995) is a former United States Air Force Strategic Air Command base in California, northeast of Atwater, northwest of Merced, and about 115 miles (185 km) south of Sacramento.

The Central Valley base in unincorporated Merced County was closed in 1995, pursuant to a Base Realignment and Closure Commission decision after the end of the Cold War and the disestablishment of Strategic Air Command (SAC). It is now known as the Castle Airport Aviation and Development Center.

== History ==
The airfield was opened on 20 September 1941 as the Army Air Force Basic Flying School, one of the fields used by the 30,000 Pilot Training Program. It provided basic air training for beginning pilots and crewmen. Many pilots and crews were trained here during the war, including Women's Air Service Pilots (WASPs).

Auxiliary air fields used by Merced Army Air Field (as the site was known at the time) during the war were:

- Merced Municipal Airport Auxiliary Field No. 1 37°20′01″N 120°30′30″W
- Ballico Auxiliary Field No. 2 37°29′02″N 120°41′50″W
- Howard Auxiliary Field No. 3 37°19′33″N 120°48′07″W
- Athlone Auxiliary Field No. 4 37°11′37″N 120°21′41″W
- Potter Auxiliary Field No. 5 37°08′17″N 120°31′59″W
- Merced New Municipal Airport Auxiliary Field No. 6 37°17′12″N 120°30′58″W
- Mariposa Auxiliary Field 37°30′40″N 120°02′21″W
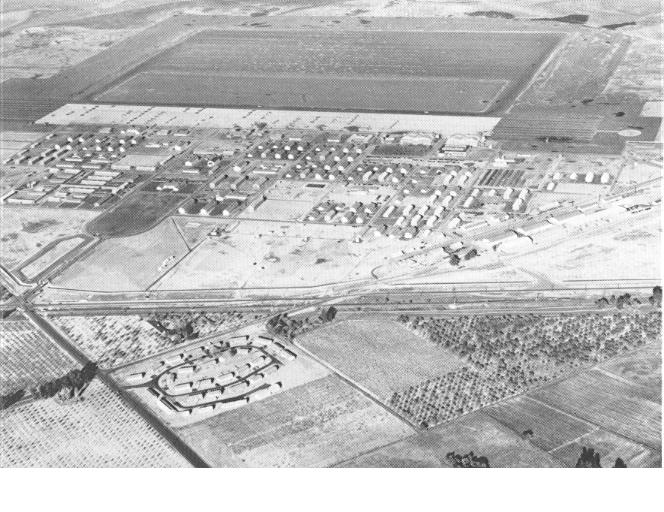
  Merced Army Airfield, November 1942

=== Postwar years ===
With the end of the war 444th Bombardment Group (Very Heavy) arrived on 15 November 1945 from West Field, Tinian with four squadrons (344th, 676th, 677th, and 678th) of wartime B-29s. The 444th operated from Merced for about six months with the 678th BS being re-designated as the 10th Recon Squadron and its aircraft being converted to the RB-29 configuration.

The three B-29 squadrons inactivated at Atwater on 6 May 1946 with the 10th Reconnaissance Squadron relocating to Davis-Monthan Field, Arizona where it turned in its RB-29 aircraft. The 444th was inactivated on 16 November 1947.

During the summer of 1945, when most other air fields were winding down, Merced was expanded to accommodate the large air tankers then programmed to come into service. After the war ended, Merced was home to several air tanker squadrons and remained a training center for pilots and air crews.

=== 93d Bombardment Wing ===
Merced Army Air Field became Castle Field on 17 January 1946, named for Brigadier General Frederick Castle. On Christmas Eve 1944, Castle remained at the controls of his burning B-17 Flying Fortress over Europe while his crew bailed out, then was killed when the aircraft exploded; he was posthumously awarded the Medal of Honor.

The 93d Bombardment Group (Very Heavy) was activated at Merced on 21 June 1946, starting a nearly 50-year relationship with the airfield. The 93rd was a former Eighth Air Force B-24 Liberator group which was assigned to Merced for Boeing B-29 Superfortress training. The 93rd was one of SAC's first ten bomb groups. There were three initial operational squadrons (328th, 329th, and 330th) which absorbed the equipment and aircraft of the inactivated 444th BG.

On 1 October 1946, the base was put on "minimal operations on caretaker status," with control of the facility under the Colorado Springs AAF. The 93rd Bomb Group, however remained active. It, along with the 509th Composite Group at Roswell Army Air Field, New Mexico, was all there was of Strategic Air Command at that time. The base remained in this status until 1 May 1947 when it was reactivated.

On 1 May 1947, Castle Field was reactivated under Strategic Air Command. On 28 July 1947, the 93rd Bombardment Wing, (Very Heavy) was established and took over responsibility from the group. During 1947–1948, it flew Boeing B-29 Superfortresses, but soon received the upgraded version of the B-29, the Boeing B-50 Superfortress. In 1948, the entire wing deployed to Kadena AB, Okinawa, becoming the first Strategic Air Command bomb group to deploy in full strength to the Far East.

Castle Field was renamed Castle Air Force Base on 13 January 1948, this following the establishment of the USAF as a separate military service in September 1947.

On 27 June 1949, the Air Force Reserve's 447th Bombardment Group was activated at Castle and equipped with the B-29s formerly of the 93d Bomb Wing. The 447th remained active until 16 June 1951 when the group was activated and the aircraft and personnel sent to Far East Air Forces as replacements for combat losses during the Korean War. With the unit's departure, the 447th was inactivated.

The Convair B-36 Peacemaker entered SAC's inventory in 1948. The huge plane dwarfed earlier bombers and the 93rd, along with all other B-29 and B-50 bomb groups, was redesignated as "Medium." Only the B-36 groups were "Heavy."

The wing began aerial refueling operations in October 1950, providing aerial refueling and navigational assistance for the July 1952 movement of the 31st Fighter-Escort Wing from the United States to Japan, the first jet fighter crossing of the Pacific Ocean, during the Korean War. From 1953 to 1955, the wing flew Boeing KC-97 Stratofreighters. All-jet Boeing KC-135 tankers came on line in 1957.

The 93d Bombardment Wing (Medium) received its first Boeing B-47s in May 1954, but its involvement with the new Stratojet was curtailed on 29 June 1955 when the wing received the first production line Boeing B-52B Stratofortress, making it the first SAC bomb wing to receive the new aircraft. The wing became SAC's primary B-52 aircrew training organization, incorporating KC-135 aircrew training for the air refueling mission in mid-1956. For this purpose, it set up the 4017th Combat Crew Training Squadron which was supposed to handle all B-52 crew training for the next few years. When the mission of B-52 training became too great a task for just one squadron, the Wing's other three squadrons took over the flight training role and the 4017th assumed responsibility for ground instruction in 1956. The 93d was SAC's primary B-52 training organization and retained some of its B-47s until 1956 for crew training purposes. It was one of the few wings in SAC to concurrently operate both the B-47 and B-52.

In November 1956, the wing made non-stop B-52 flights of some 16,000 nautical miles (29,600 km) around North America and to the North Pole.

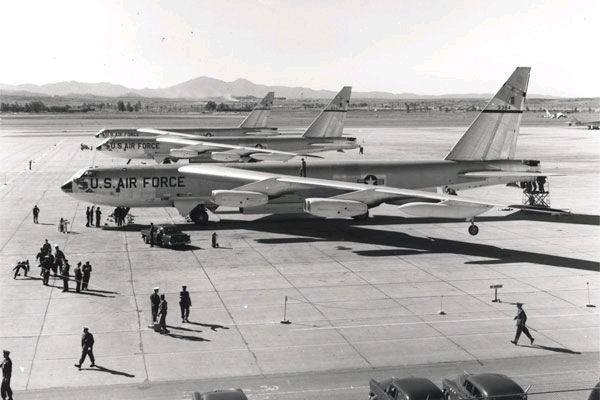
Three B-52Bs of the 93d Bomb Wing prepare to depart March AFB for Castle AFB, after their record-setting round-the-world flight in 1957.

Although most of the wing's components were used for B-52 and KC-135 aircrew training between 1956 and 1995, one or more of its units sometimes participated in tactical operations, including tactical bombardment and aerial refueling.

From April 1968 to April 1974, the 93rd operated a special B-52 replacement training unit to support SAC's B-52 operation in Southeast Asia. Also, the 328th and 329th Bomb Squadrons deployed to U-Tapao Royal Thai Navy Airfield, Thailand where they flew combat missions over Vietnam, Cambodia, and Laos during the Vietnam War.

The wing won the SAC Bombing and Navigation Competition and the Fairchild Trophy in 1949, 1952, and 1970, and the Omaha Trophy as the outstanding SAC wing in 1970.

In August 1990, the wing operated an aerial port of embarkation (APOE) for personnel and equipment deploying to Southwest Asia during Desert Shield.

In addition to aerial refueling, Castle-based KC-135 tankers ferried personnel and equipment, while B-52s deployed to strategic locations worldwide, including Saudi Arabia. B-52s bombed the Iraqi Republican Guard and targeted Iraqi chemical weapons, nuclear, and industrial plants during Desert Storm, January–February 1991.

On 1 September 1991, the 93rd Bombardment lost its operational KC-135 unit, the 924th Air Refueling Squadron, and its KC-135 aircrew formal training unit, the 329th Combat Crew Training Squadron. It also implemented the objective wing organization and was redesignated as the 93rd Wing (93 WG).

On 1 June 1992, pursuant to the inactivation of Strategic Air Command and the establishment of the new Air Combat Command (ACC), the 93rd Wing was transferred from SAC, reassigned to ACC, and renamed the 93rd Bomb Wing (93 BW).

Shortly afterwards, nationwide base closures under the BRAC process targeted numerous USAF installations, especially former SAC installations, to include Castle AFB. With BRAC closure of Castle AFB confirmed, the 322d Bomb Squadron was inactivated on 3 May 1994 and the wing was placed on non-operational status. However, the 93rd Bomb Wing continued to supervise the closure of Castle AFB. The 93rd Bomb Wing was inactivated on 30 September 1995 with the closure of Castle AFB, but was subsequently redesignated as the 93d Air Control Wing (93 ACW) and reactivated at Robins AFB, Georgia on 29 January 1996.

==== Notable operations ====
- Operation Power Flite: First jet aircraft nonstop flight around the world (January 1957).
- Nonstop, unrefueled KC-135 flight from Yokota AB, Japan, to Washington, D.C. (April 1958).

=== Closure ===
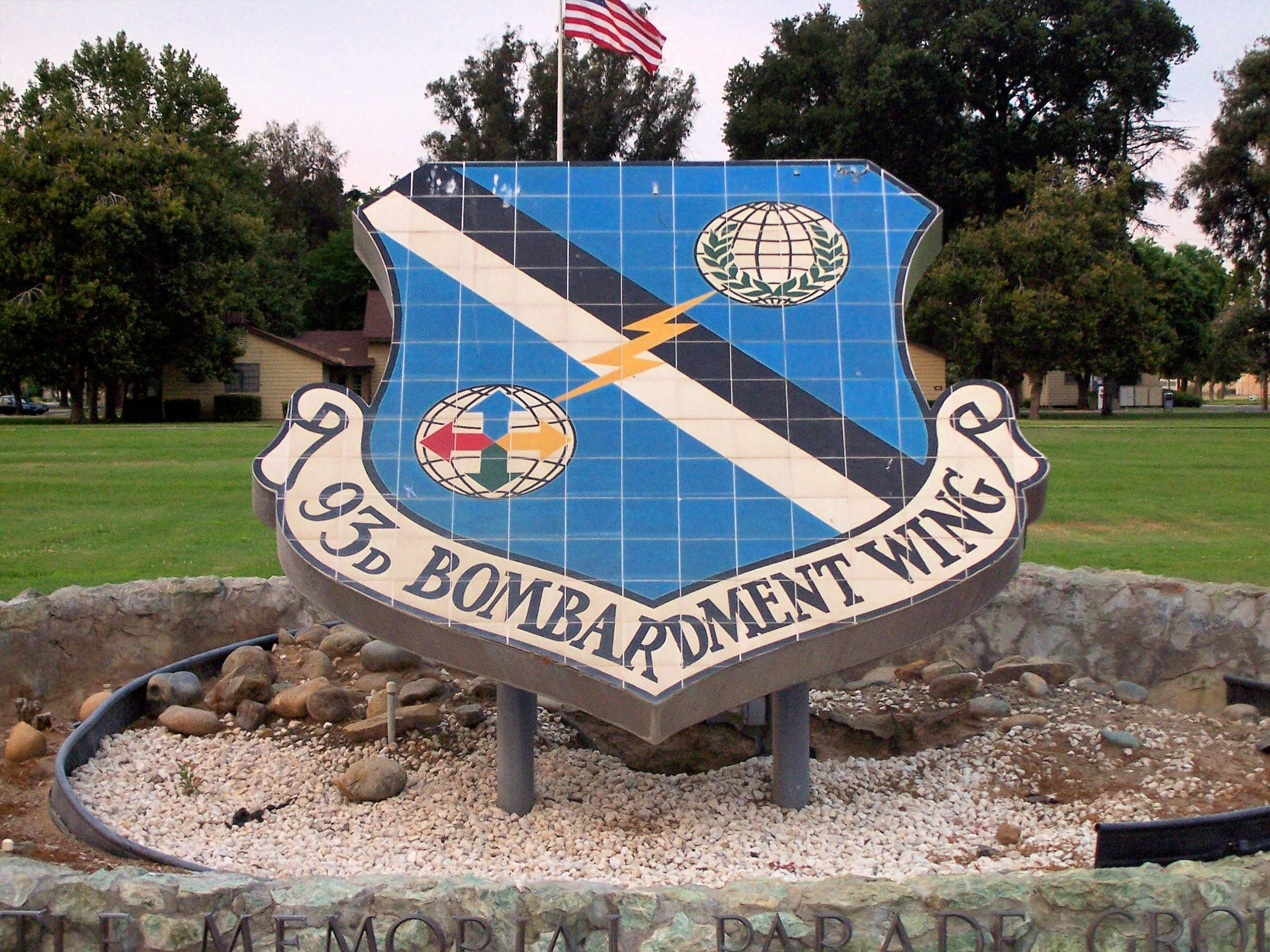
Sign at front entrance of deactivated Castle AFB

The end of the Cold War brought many changes to the Air Force, and Castle AFB was selected for closure under the Defense Base Closure and Realignment Act of 1991 during Round II Base Closure Commission deliberations (BRAC 91).

On 1 June 1992 the 93d was relieved from assignment to SAC and was reassigned to the newly formed Air Combat Command (ACC). It was then redesignated as the 93d Bomb Wing, its B-52G aircraft given the ACC tail code of "CA" and the marking of blue tail stripes. The 322d Bomb Squadron was inactivated 3 May 1994 and the wing was placed on non-operational status.

However, the 93d continued to supervise the closure of Castle AFB. The 93d Bomb Wing was inactivated on 30 September 1995 with the closure of Castle AFB. The Castle Air Museum remains at the site.

== Civilian use ==
It has been identified as the preferred location for the central maintenance facility of the proposed California High-Speed Rail system.

The University of California, Merced maintains a research site on the former base, which was its first facility before construction of the main campus in Merced.

United States Penitentiary, Atwater stands on a portion of the grounds of the former Air Force Base.

In 2011, Google leased 60 acres (24 ha) in order to test the development of their new project, the self-driving car, which has become Waymo. Google also leased a hangar at the former Air Force base in order to continue testing a new project, Project Loon. Project Loon was a program that creates an aerial Wi-Fi network, using balloons to loft relay equipment to high altitude. The former Base was expecting Google to pay approximately $456,000 in rental fees for both of these projects over the course of one year.

In 2021, Merced County completed a $2.1 million expansion project of the automotive research and testing complex located at Castle (pictured). Known as TRC—California, the site includes a 2.2-mile oval test track, a one-mile city course and two large vehicle dynamics areas. The 225-acre site is already attracting a significant amount of business interest from major car companies. The County expects expansion to continue in the coming years as testing demand at the site increases.

In addition to vehicle technology, Castle has also become a focal point for goods movement. In February 2022, the Board of Supervisors approved an agreement with Patriot Rail to establish a rail district at Castle Commerce Center. That district became operational in May 2022 and is located near the southeastern corner of Castle. The rail district will enhance the ability of agricultural producers, manufacturers and other enterprises from throughout the San Joaquin Valley to quickly and efficiently ship and receive products via the BNSF railroad mainline, which runs adjacent to the site. A rail spur from the BNSF lines currently connects to Castle, and Patriot Rail will soon develop additional infrastructure to facilitate enhanced rail freight service from the location.

== Previous names ==
- Army Air Force Basic Flying School, Merced, CA, 20 September 1941 – 7 April 1942
- Merced Army Flying School, 7 April 1942 – 8 May 1943
- Merced Army Airfield, 8 May 1943 – 17 January 1946
- Castle Field, 17 January 1946 – 13 January 1948

== Major Commands to which assigned ==
- West Coast Air Force Training Center, 20 September 1941

Re-designated: West Coast AAF Training Center
Re-designated: AAF West Coast Training Center, 1 May 1942
Re-designated: AAF Western Flying Training Command, 31 July 1943

- Continental Air Forces, 1 July 1945

Re-designated: Strategic Air Command, 21 March 1946 – 1 June 1992

- Air Combat Command, 1 June 1992 – 30 September 1995

Note: Base directed to revert to "minimum operations on caretaker status;' 1 Oct 1946; base under administrative control of Colorado Springs Army Air Base, Colorado, 1 Nov 1946 – 1 Jul 1947. Reactivated from caretaker status, 1 May 1947"

== Major units assigned ==
- Air Corps Basic Flying School

Re-designated: AAF Basic Flying School
Re-designated: AAF Pilot School, Basic, 20 September 1941 – 30 June 1945

- 89th Air Base Group, 3 November 1941 – 15 December 1942
- 90th Base HQ and Air Base Sq, 13 June 1942
- 35th Flying Training Wing, 8 June – 11 September 1943
- 3026th AAF Base Unit, 1 May 1944 – 30 June 1945
- 446th AAF Base Unit, 1–18 July 1945
- 482nd AAF Base Unit, 19 July 1945 – 15 August 1947
- HQ I Staging Command, 7 October 1945 – 3 April 1946
- 444th Bombardment Group, 15 November 1945 – 6 May 1946
- 93rd Bombardment Group, 21 June 1946 – 16 June 1952

Later: 93rd Operations Group, 1 September 1991 – 30 June 1995

- 93rd Bombardment Wing, 15 August 1947 – 30 September 1995
- 93d Air Refueling Squadron, 1 March 1949 – 31 March 1995
- 447th Bombardment Group, 26 June 1949 – 16 June 1951
- 2nd Strategic Support Squadron, 16 May 1951 – 1 September 1956
- 340th Air Refueling Squadron, 20 October 1952 – 18 January 1954
- 90th Air Refueling Squadron, 18 January 1954 – 5 August 1955
- 341st Air Refueling Squadron, 11 June 1954 – 15 August 1955
- 456th Fighter-Interceptor Squadron, 18 October 1955 – 18 July 1968
- 47th Air Division, 11 July 1959 – 30 June 1971
- 924th Air Refueling Squadron, 1 July 1959 – 1 October 1994
- 84th Fighter-Interceptor Squadron, 1 September 1973 – 27 February 1987

== Notable people ==
- Ray Allen, professional basketball player, was born at the base on 20 July 1975.
- Bobby "Weezer" Hutchins, an Our Gang / The Little Rascals actor, was killed in a mid-air collision on 17 May 1945, while attending flight school at the base during WWII.

== See also ==
- Bombers B-52 – 1957 drama film part of which was filmed at Castle
- California World War II Army Airfields
- List of former United States Air Force installations

== References and notes ==
- Endicott, Judy G. (1999) Active Air Force wings as of 1 October 1995; USAF active flying, space, and missile squadrons as of 1 October 1995. Maxwell AFB, Alabama: Office of Air Force History. CD-ROM.
- Manning, Thomas A. (2005), History of Air Education and Training Command, 1942–2002. Office of History and Research, Headquarters, AETC, Randolph AFB, Texas OCLC 71006954, 29991467
- Maurer, Maurer (1983). Air Force Combat Units of World War II. Maxwell AFB, Alabama: Office of Air Force History. ISBN 0-89201-092-4.
- Mueller, Robert (1989). Volume 1: Active Air Force Bases Within the United States of America on 17 September 1982. USAF Reference Series, Office of Air Force History, United States Air Force, Washington, D.C. ISBN 0-912799-53-6, 0-16-002261-4
- Patton, Victor. "Google Set to Lease Castle Site for Self-Driving Car." Merced Sun-Star [Merced] 24 Jan. 2014: n. pag. Print.
- Ravenstein, Charles A. (1984). Air Force Combat Wings Lineage and Honors Histories 1947–1977. Maxwell AFB, Alabama: Office of Air Force History. ISBN 0-912799-12-9.
- Rogers, Brian (2005). United States Air Force Unit Designations Since 1978. Hinkley, England: Midland Publications. ISBN 1-85780-197-0.
- Shaw, Frederick J. (2004), Locating Air Force Base Sites, History’s Legacy, Air Force History and Museums Program, United States Air Force, Washington DC. OCLC 57007862, 1050653629
- Yawger, Doane. "Former Air Force One Lands in Atwater." Merced Sun-Star 16 Oct. 2013: n.pag. Web. 5 Mary 2014.
