= 340th Expeditionary Air Refueling Squadron =

US Air Force unit

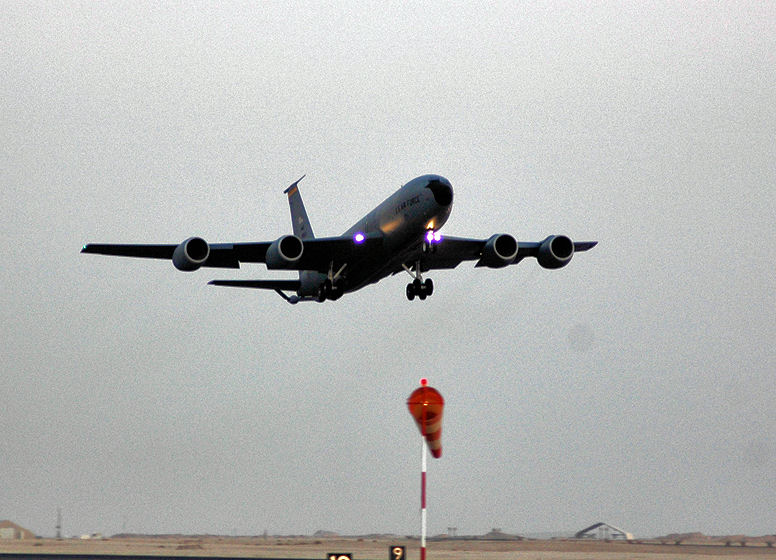
- KC-135 Stratotanker operating with the 340th Expeditionary Air Refueling Squadron
- Active: 1952–1962; 2002–present
- Country: United States
- Branch: United States Air Force
- Role: Aerial refueling
- Part of: United States Air Forces Central
- Nickname: Pythons
- Motto: As Briefed (1952–1962)
- Engagements: South West Pacific Theater of World War II; War in Afghanistan; War in Iraq; Military intervention against ISIL
- Decorations: Distinguished Unit Citation; Air Force Meritorious Unit Award; Philippine Republic Presidential Unit Citation

Insignia
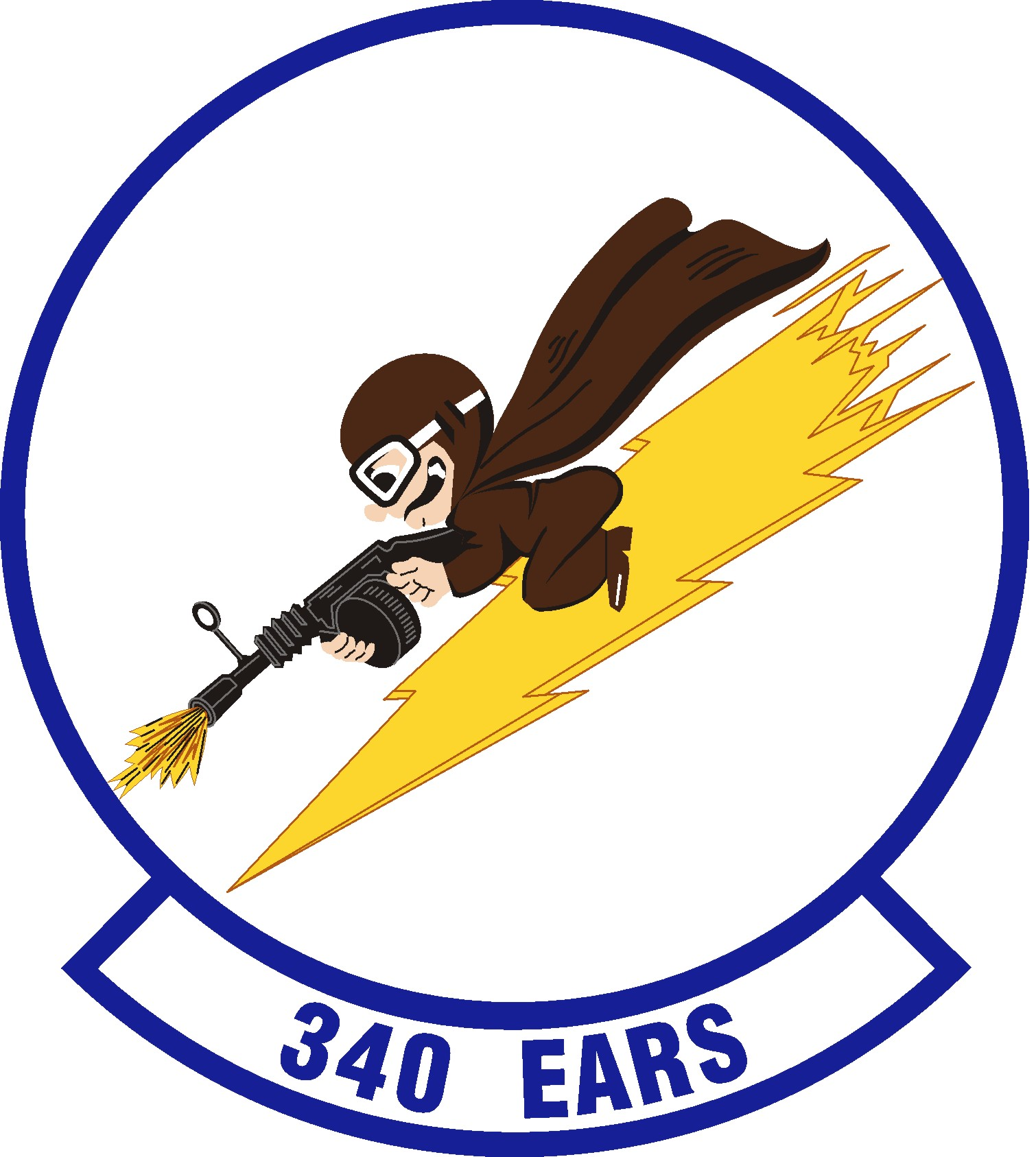
- 340 Expeditionary Air Refueling Sq emblem

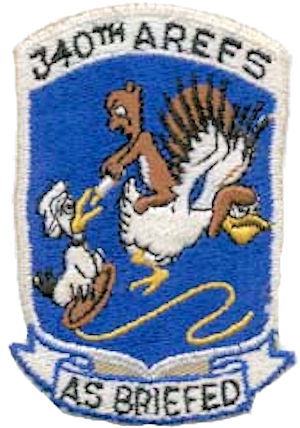
- Patch with 340th Air Refueling Squadron emblem

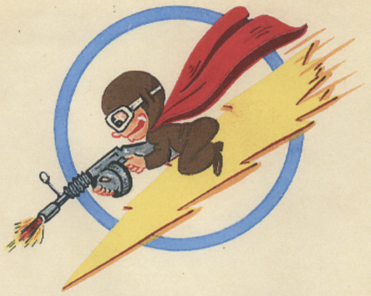
- 340th Fighter Squadron emblem (approved 27 March 1943)

The 340th Expeditionary Air Refueling Squadron is a provisional United States Air Force unit. It is assigned to the 379th Expeditionary Operations Group at Al Udeid Air Base, Qatar. It has supported combat operations in Afghanistan, Iraq, and Syria from this location.

The squadron was first activated during World War II as the 340th Fighter Squadron, a Republic P-47 Thunderbolt unit that engaged in combat in the Southwest Pacific Theater, where it earned two Distinguished Unit Citations for action in the Philippines. Following V-J Day, it served in the occupation forces in Japan until inactivating in 1946.

The 340th Air Refueling Squadron was formed in 1952 at Castle Air Force Base, California, where it trained with the 93d Bombardment Wing. After becoming combat ready, it moved to Whiteman Air Force Base, Missouri, where it served with the 340th Bombardment Wing, a Strategic Air Command Boeing B-47 Stratojet wing, until inactivating in 1962. The squadron was consolidated with the 340th Fighter Squadron in 1985, but the combined squadron was not activated until being converted to provisional status as the 340th Expeditionary Air Refueling Squadron.

== History ==
=== World War II ===
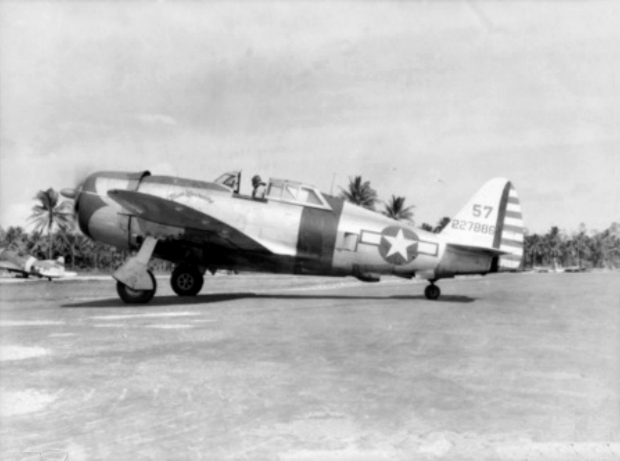
348th Group P-47D on Morotai in 1945

The 340th Fighter Squadron was first activated at Mitchel Field, New York at the end of September 1942 as one of the original three squadrons of the 348th Fighter Group. Mitchel was only an activation base for the squadron, which moved on paper the same day to Bradley Field, Connecticut. The squadron trained at various bases in the Northeastern United States with Republic P-47 Thunderbolts until ready for overseas shipment in May 1943.

Upon arrival in New Guinea, the squadron flew patrol and reconnaissance missions and escorted bombers attacking Japanese targets in New Guinea and New Britain. Between 16 and 31 December 1943, the squadron flew missions covering Allied landings and supporting the advance of ground forces in New Britain, for which it was awarded a Distinguished Unit Citation.

In 1944 the unit began attacks on airfields, military installations and shipping in western New Guinea, Seram Island and Halmahera with the aim of neutralizing enemy forces in that area to prepare for the Allied assault on the Philippines. As the attack progressed, the squadron moved to the Philippines in November 1944, providing convoy cover and ground support for invading forces, in addition to continuing its other missions. On 24 December 1944, the squadron was part of a group formation covering bombers attacking Clark Field. The unit defended the bombers against enemy interceptors, earning a second Distinguished Unit Citation. The squadron was also cited by the Philippine government for its support for the liberation of the Philippines.

The forward move of the squadron enabled it to begin attacks on shipping along the coast of China and to escort bombers flying missions to Taiwan. The squadron began transitioning into North American P-51 Mustang fighters in February 1945. It moved to the Ryuku Islands shortly before the end of the war, and conducted escort and attack missions to Japan before the war ended. In October 1945, it moved to Itami Airfield as part of the occupation forces and was inactivated there in May 1946.

=== Strategic Air Command ===
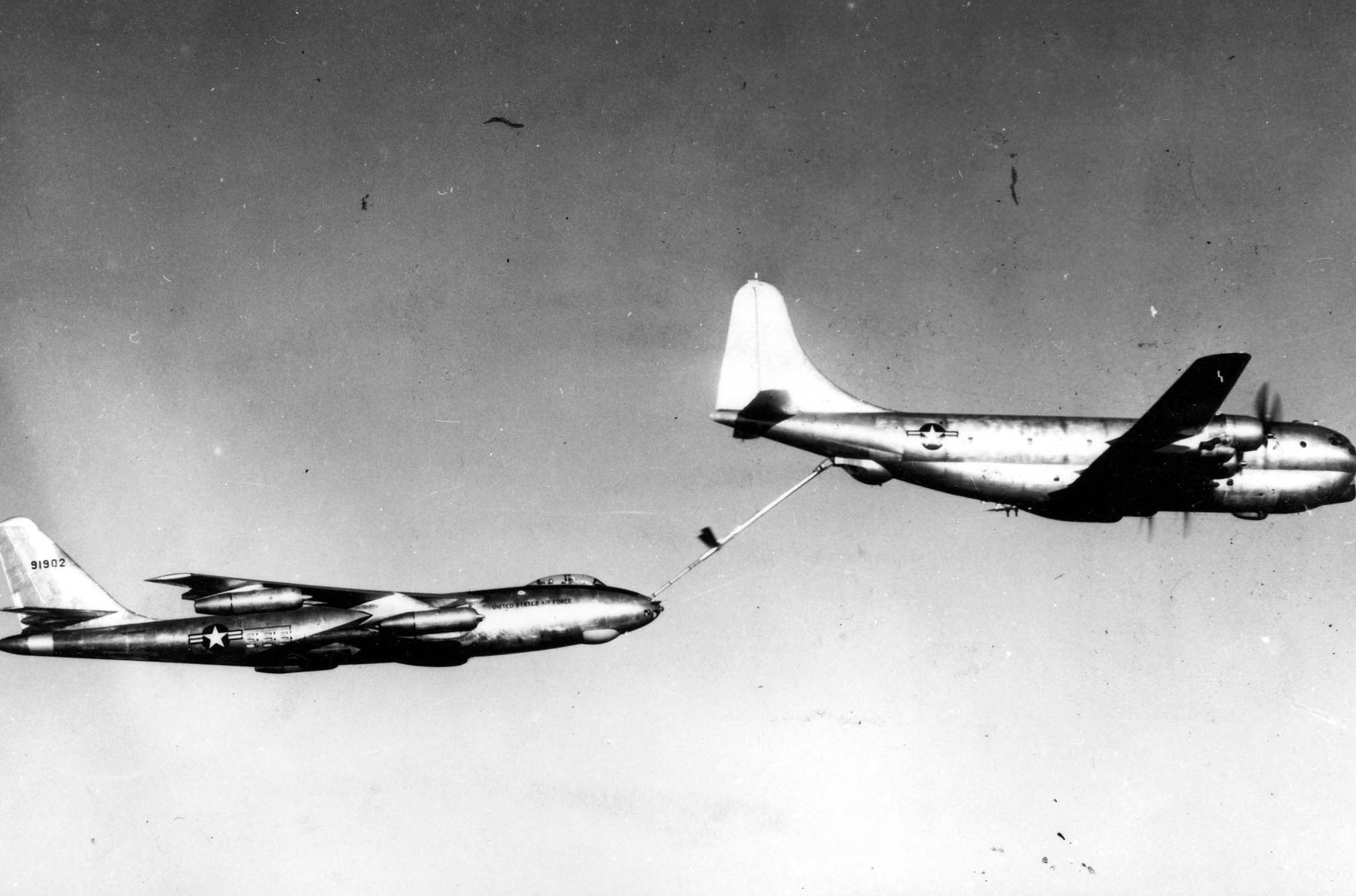
KC-97 refueling a B-47

The 340th Air Refueling Squadron was activated on 20 October 1952 as part of the 340th Bombardment Wing, which was activated the same day. However the squadron was activated at Castle Air Force Base, California where it drew its cadre from, and trained under the supervision of the 93d Bombardment Wing after receiving its initial manning in January 1953. It was not until January 1954 that it joined its parent wing at Whiteman Air Force Base, Missouri. The move to Whiteman was without personnel or equipment, with its planes and manpower being transferred to the 90th Air Refueling Squadron. When it arrived at Whiteman, the 340th Wing was just beginning to receive its aircraft and the squadron did not become operational again until August 1954.

The squadron flew the Boeing KC-97 Stratofreighter, providing air refueling to USAF units until it was inactivated in October 1962. In 1961, the squadron was selected to represent Second Air Force in Strategic Air Command's annual bombing competition. It was inactivated in 1962.

The two squadrons were merged as the 340th Air Refueling Squadron in September 1985, but the consolidated squadron was not active before conversion to provisional status.

=== Expeditionary operations ===
Reactivated as a provisional squadron about 2002 as a part of the global war on terror. It is equipped with Boeing KC-135 Stratotankers and conducts combat air refueling as one of the largest squadrons in the Air Force, doubling in size in 2014 due to increased operations in Syria. The squadron was active as part of Operation Iraqi Freedom and Operation Enduring Freedom. It is currently supporting the Military intervention against ISIL in Iraq and Syria. As a provisional unit, the squadron is manned and equipped by deployed airmen from the regular air force, Air Force Reserve and Air National Guard. Elements of the 155th Air Refueling Wing were deployed to the squadron during March 2016, and elements of the 117th Air Refueling Wing during April–June 2016.

== Lineage ==
340th Fighter Squadron

- Constituted as the 340th Fighter Squadron, Single Engine on 24 September 1942

Activated on 30 September 1942
Inactivated on 10 May 1946

- Consolidated with the 340th Air Refueling Squadron, Medium as the 340th Air Refueling Squadron, Heavy on 19 September 1985

340th Expeditionary Air Refueling Squadron

- Constituted as the 340th Air Refueling Squadron, Medium on 3 October 1952

Activated on 20 October 1952
Discontinued and inactivated 15 October 1962

- Consolidated with the 340th Fighter Squadron as the 340th Air Refueling Squadron, Heavy on 19 September 1985
- Converted to provisional status and redesignated 340th Expeditionary Air Refueling Squadron on 12 December 2001
- Activated in 2003

=== Assignments ===
- 348th Fighter Group, 30 September 1942 – 10 May 1946
- 340th Bombardment Wing 3 October 1952 (attached to 93d Bombardment Wing)
- Fifteenth Air Force, 1 July 1953 (remained attached to 93d Bombardment Wing)
- 340th Bombardment Wing 18 January 1954 – 15 October 1962 (detached October–December 1956, September–December 1957, January–April 1959, January–April 1961)
- 376th Air Expeditionary Wing, 2001 – present

=== Stations ===
- Mitchel Field, New York, 30 September 1942
- Bradley Field, Connecticut, 30 September 1942
- Westover Field, Massachusetts, 30 October 1942
- Hillsgrove Army Air Field, Rhode Island, 23 January 1943
- Westover Field, Massachusetts, 29 April – 9 May 1943
- Jackson Airfield (7 Mile Drome), Port Moresby, (Papua) New Guinea, 23 June 1943 – 13 December 1943
- Finschhafen Airfield (Dreger Field), New Guinea (Irian Jaya), 17 December 1943
- Saidor Airfield, (Papua) New Guinea, 27 March 1944
- Wakde Airfield, Wakde, Netherlands East Indies, 22 May 1944
- Kornasoren Airfield Noemfoor, Netherlands East Indies, 24 August 1944
- Tacloban Airfield, Leyte, Philippines, 30 November 1944
- Tanauan Airfield, Leyte, Philippines, 14 December 1944
- San Marcelino Airfield, Leyte, Philippines, 6 February 1945
- Floridablanca Airfield, Luzon, Philippines, 15 May 1945
- Ie Shima Airfield, Okinawa, 9 July 1945
- Kanoya Airfield, Japan, 9 September 1945
- Itami Airfield, Japan, 20 October 1945 – 10 May 1946
- Castle Air Force Base, California, 3 October 1952
- Whiteman Air Force Base, Missouri, 18 January 1954 – 15 October 1962
- Al Udeid Air Base, Qatar 2001 – present

=== Aircraft ===
- Republic P-47 Thunderbolt, 1942–1945
- North American P-51 Mustang, 1945
- Boeing KC-97 Stratotanker, 1953–1962
- Boeing KC-135 Stratotanker 2001 – present
