= 93rd Air-Ground Operations Wing =

93d Air Ground Operations Wing
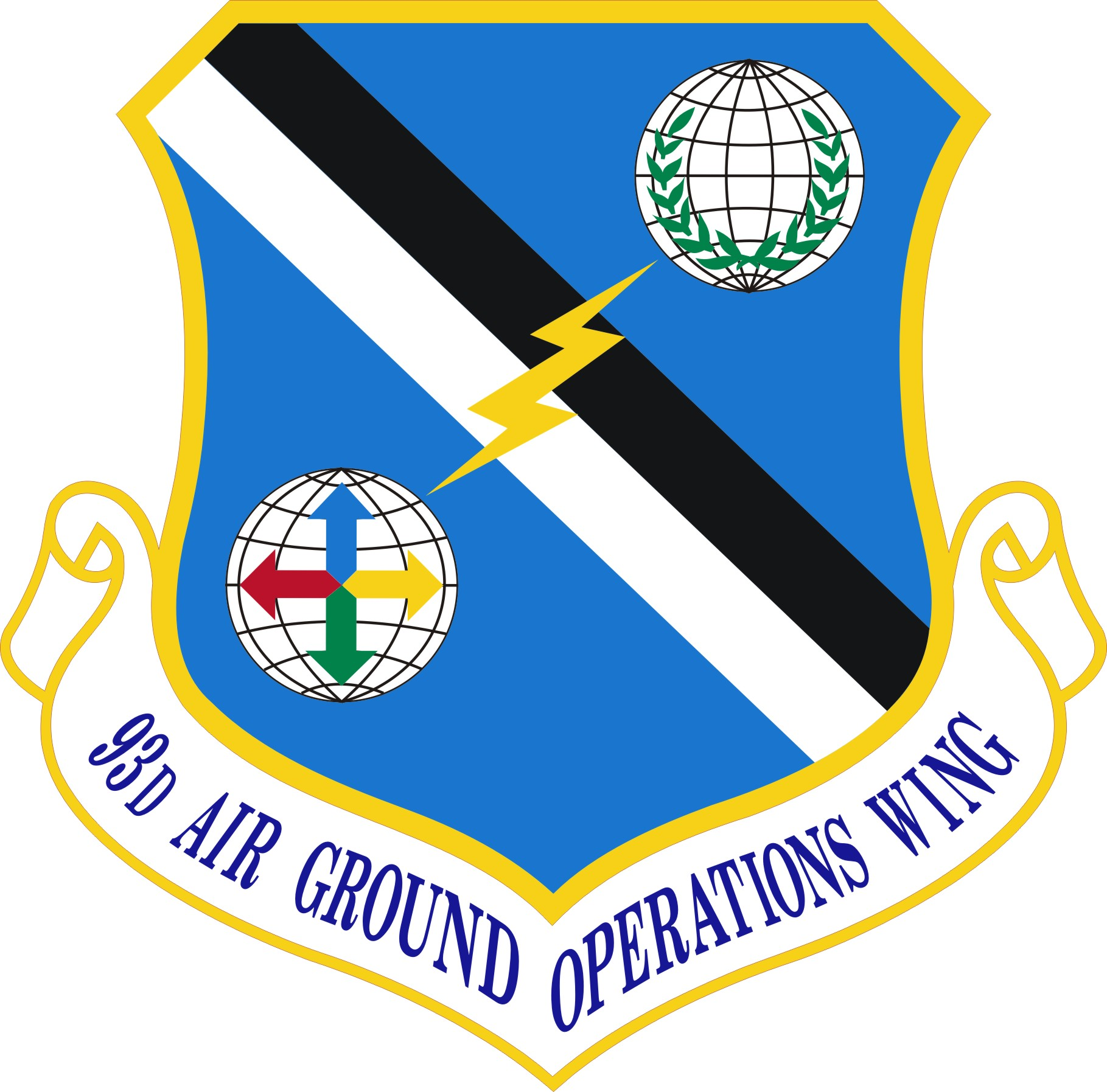
- 93 AGOW
- Active: 1947–1948; 1948–1995; 1996–2002; 2008–present
- Country: United States
- Branch: United States Air Force
- Part of: Air Combat Command
- Garrison/HQ: Moody Air Force Base, Georgia
- Mottos: Defend, Attack, Defeat!
- Decorations: Distinguished Unit Citation; Air Force Outstanding Unit; Meritorious Unit Citation
- Battle honours: World War II: Antisubmarine American Theater; Egypt-Libya; Tunisia; Sicily; Naples-Foggia; Air Offensive Europe; Normandy; Northern France; Rhineland; Ardennes-Alsace; Central Europe; Air Combat; EAME Theater

Commanders
- Current commander: Col. Jeffrey M. Mack
- Notable commanders: Brig Gen Michael A. Longoria

Insignia
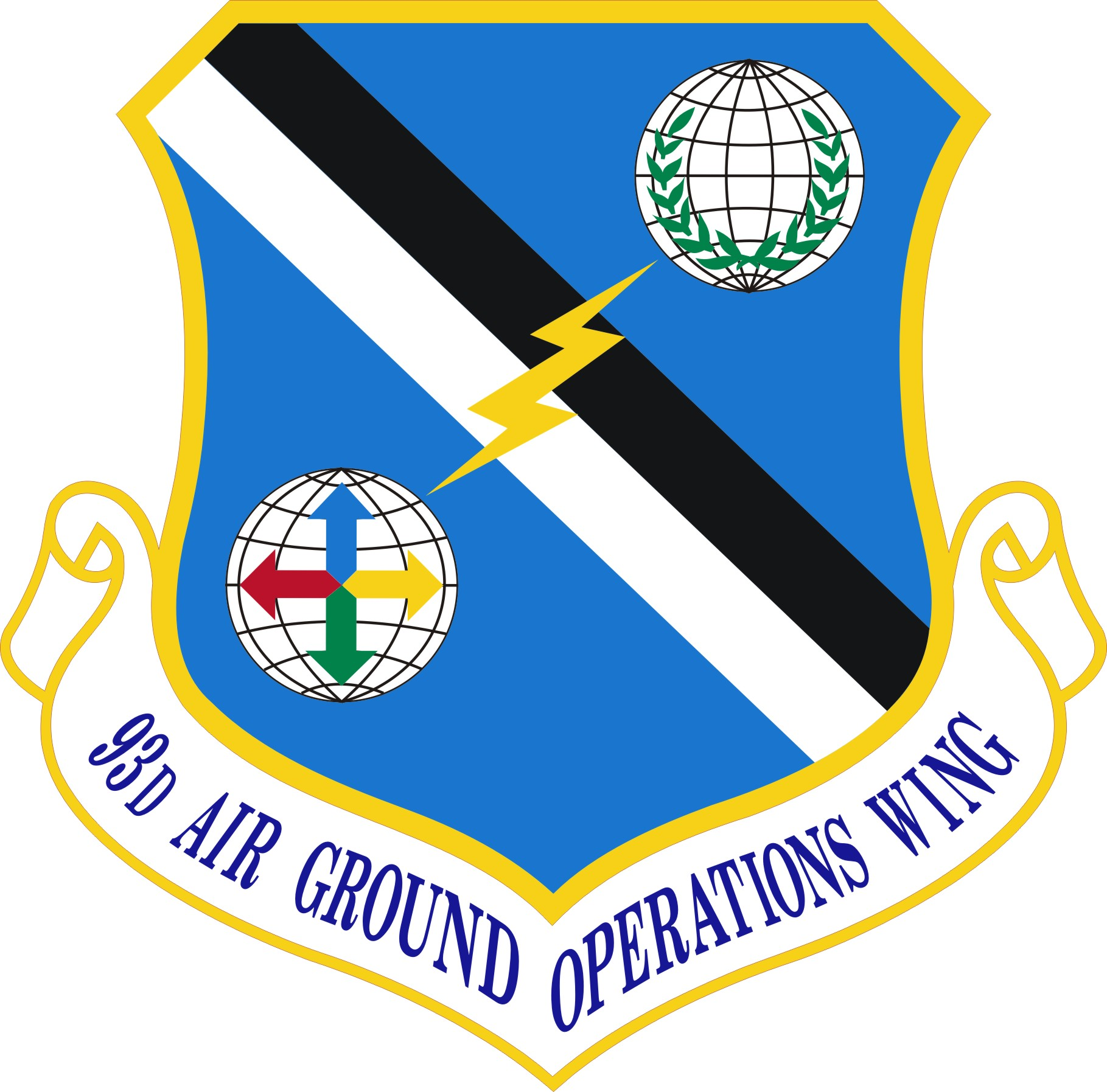
- 93d Air Ground Operations Wing emblem (approved 4 September 1953)

The 93d Air Ground Operations Wing (93d AGOW) is a United States Air Force unit assigned to Air Combat Command, Ninth Air Force. It is stationed as a tenant unit at Moody Air Force Base, Georgia.

The wing directs the 3d Air Support Operations Group (3d ASOG) at Fort Cavazos, Texas (supporting III Corps), 18th Air Support Operations Group (18th ASOG) at Pope Field, North Carolina (supporting XVIII Airborne Corps of Fort Bragg), both Forward Air Control groups which arrange air support to ground forces. It also directs the 820th Base Defense Group (820th BDG), a Force Protection with an airborne capability, at Moody AFB, Georgia.

The U.S. Air Force Historical Research Agency has determined that the wing's 93d Operations Group is descended from the 93d Bombardment Group, first formed in 1942. It was the first VIII Bomber Command B-24 Liberator heavy bombardment group to begin bombing Occupied Europe and Nazi Germany from RAF Alconbury, England on 9 October 1942. Active for over 60 years, the 93d Bombardment Wing was a component organization of Strategic Air Command's deterrent force during the Cold War, as a strategic bombardment wing.

== History ==
For additional history and lineage, see 93d Operations Group

=== Strategic Air Command: B-29s, B-50s, and B-47s ===
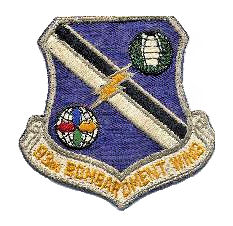
Emblem of the 93d Bombardment Wing

On 28 July 1947, the 93d Bombardment Wing, (Very Heavy) was established and maintained combat readiness for global strategic bombardment, flying the Boeing B-29 Superfortress. The wing was later redesignated as the 93d Bombardment Wing (Medium) as it was not chosen to be reequipped with the Convair B-36 Peacemaker, but remained with the B-29. In 1949, the wing received its first B-50 Superfortress aircraft, an improved version of the B-29. It began operations overseas with the deployment of its tactical force to RAF Mildenhall, England (July 1950 – January 1951) in response to communist aggression on the Korean peninsula. Meanwhile, the 93d Air Refueling Squadron was activated on 1 March 1949, equipped with the KB-29P (a B-29 bomber modified with a refueling boom).

The wing continued to move forward throughout the 1950s, replacing the propeller-driven B-50s with new B-47E Stratojet swept-wing medium bombers in 1954, capable of flying at high subsonic speeds and primarily designed for penetrating the airspace of the Soviet Union. It flew numerous training missions and participated in various SAC exercises and deployments with the Stratojet

=== Strategic Air Command: B-52s ===
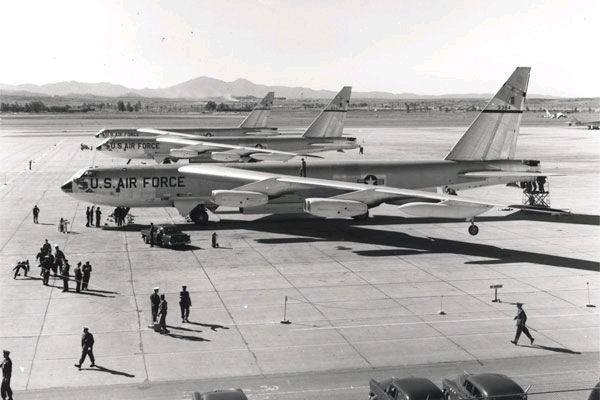
Three B-52Bs of the 93d Bomb Wing prepare to depart Castle Air Force Base, Calif., for their record-setting round-the-world flight in 1957

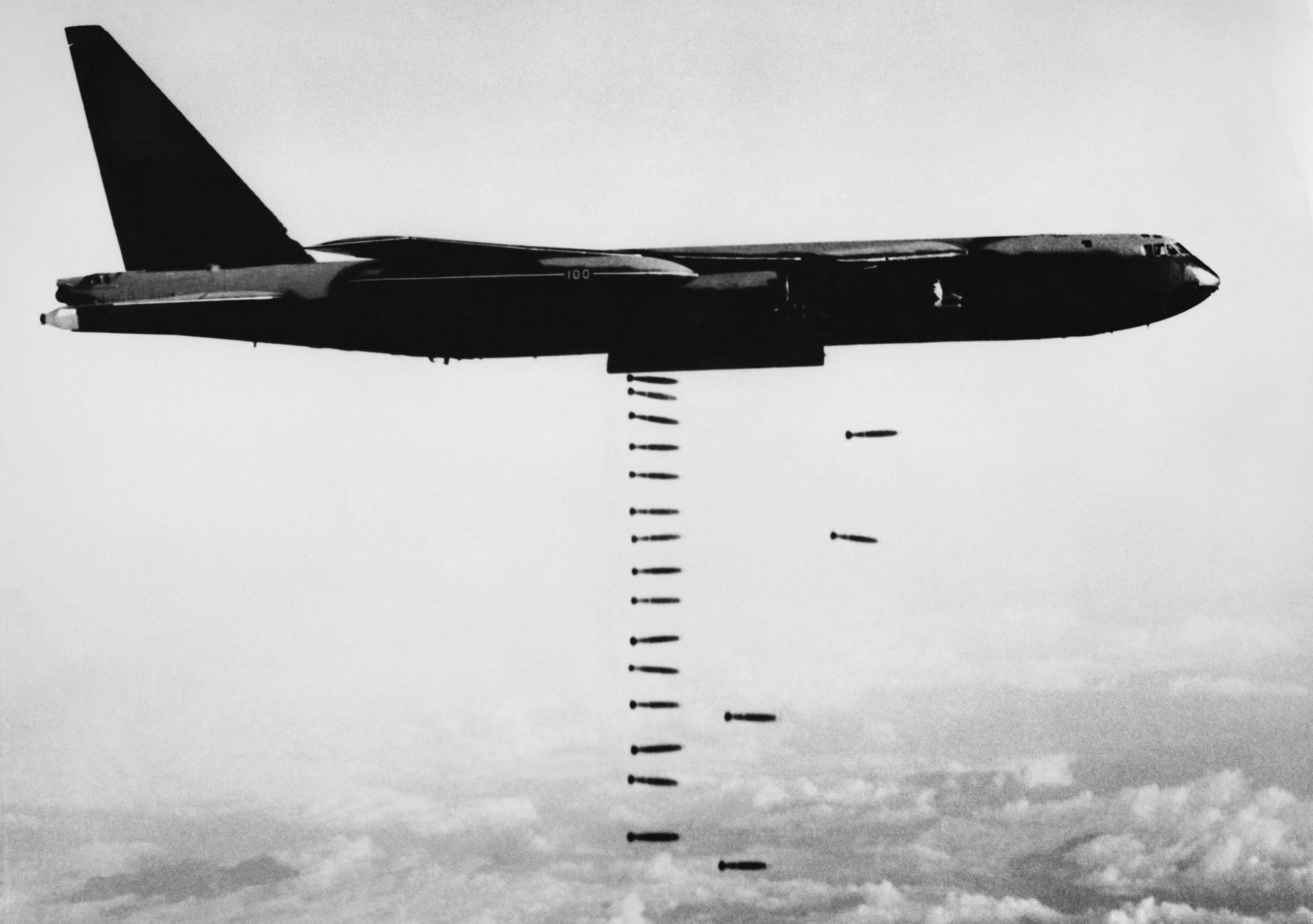
A B-52D drops 500 pound bombs

SAC assigned its first Boeing B-52 Stratofortress to the wing in June 1955. (Note: This aircraft, serial 52-8711 was retired in 1965 and put on display at the Aerospace Museum at Offutt Air Force Base, Nebraska. Knaack, p. 243) The wing was redesignated the 93d Bombardment Wing, Heavy on 1 February 1955 in anticipation of the arrival of the B-52. Its B-52Bs were initially used for crew training. The wing was declared combat ready with the B-52 on 12 March 1956, but became nonoperational two months later when a second squadron began to equip with Stratofortresses. It became operational again on 26 June 1957, when its mission became primarily crew training.

The wing retained some of its B-47s until 1956 for crew training purposes. It was one of the few wings to have operated both jet bombers simultaneously.

In 1956, the wing's three bombardment squadrons – 328th, 329th and 330th began receiving the new B-52D. The following year, they began receiving the B-52E model, while some B-52Bs remained with the 93 BW until well into the 1960s.

On 24 and 25 November 1956, in an operation known as Quick Kick, four B-52Bs of the 93d joined four B-52Cs of the 42d Bombardment Wing for a nonstop flight around the perimeter of North America. Four in-flight refuelings by Boeing KC-97 Stratofreighters were required for the 13,500-nautical-mile (25,000 km) journey. (Note: SAC was quick to point out that five to six hours could have been shaved off the flight time, if it had jet KC-135 Stratotankers instead of propeller driven KC-97s to refuel the bombers. Knaack, p. 244.) Less than two months later, in Operation Power Flight, three 93d B-52Bs flew the first non-stop jet around-the-world flight. Taking off on 16 January 1957, they flew via Newfoundland, Casablanca, Dhahran, Ceylon, the Malay Peninsula, Manila and Guam. Upon landing at March Air Force Base, California on 18 January, General Curtis LeMay, SAC Commander, greeted the crews and presented them with the Distinguished Flying Cross. Operation Power Flight was recognized by the National Aeronautical Association as the outstanding flight of 1957 and it awarded the wing the Mackay Trophy.

It was assigned the Boeing KC-135A Stratotanker in January 1957, making it the first SAC bomb wing to receive the new aircraft. In June 1958, the wing received six B-52Fs, making it the first to fly this series of the Stratofortress. Throughout the height of the Vietnam War (1968–1974) the wing operated a special B-52 aircrew replacement training unit to support SAC's B-52 operations in Southeast Asia. The wing recorded another first on 10 June 1982 when the first all female KC-135 crew, "Fair Force One", flew a five-hour training sortie.

Finally in August 1990 the wing found itself back at war. At home its support units operated an aerial port of embarkation for personnel and equipment deploying to Saudi Arabia for Operation Desert Shield. Overseas, its KC-135s refueled planes and ferried personnel and equipment to the region, while its B-52s bombed the Iraqi Republican Guard and targeted Iraqi infrastructure throughout January and February 1991.

The Air Force underwent major restructuring after the Cold War ended. On 1 September 1991, the 93d lost its air refueling commitment, (924th ARS), and its KC-135 aircrew training missions (329th CCTS). It also implemented the objective wing organization and was redesignated as the 93d Wing. On 1 June 1992 the 93d was relieved from assignment to SAC and was reassigned to the newly formed Air Combat Command (ACC). It was then redesignated as the 93d Bomb Wing.

Shortly afterwards it was announced that Castle AFB would close, under the Base Realignment and Closure Commission (BRAC) process. The 322d Bomb Squadron was inactivated 3 May 1994, and the wing became non-operational. The wing however continued to supervise the closure of Castle AFB, and was inactivated on 30 September 1995 with the closure of the base.

=== Strategic Air Command: B-52 crew training ===
When the first B-52s began to be assigned to SAC in 1955, Air Training Command had no school for the aircraft. Because of the need to get the bomber operational as soon as possible, SAC established the 4017th Combat Crew Training Squadron to conduct training on the Stratofortress. As the B-52 force expanded, the mission became too great for a single squadron and the wing's three bombardment squadrons took over the flight training program, while the 4017th conducted ground training and overall administration of the training program. As SAC's involvement in the Vietnam War increased, on 15 April 1968, SAC established a replacement training unit within the 4017th. This unit was established to qualify aircrews flying B-52E, B-52F, B-52G and B-52H bombers to fly the B-52D, which (with its Big Belly modification) was SAC's conventional bomber in Southeast Asia. After two weeks of training, the crews augmented the cadre unit in the Pacific. This training enabled SAC to meet its commitments, while at the same time spreading the burden of deployment more equitably among its entire force of B-52 crews.

=== Joint STARS from 1996 ===
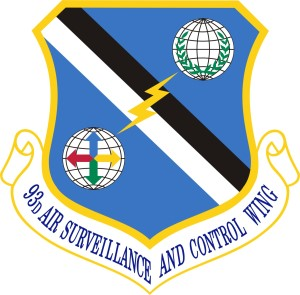
93d Air Surveillance and Air Control Wing emblem

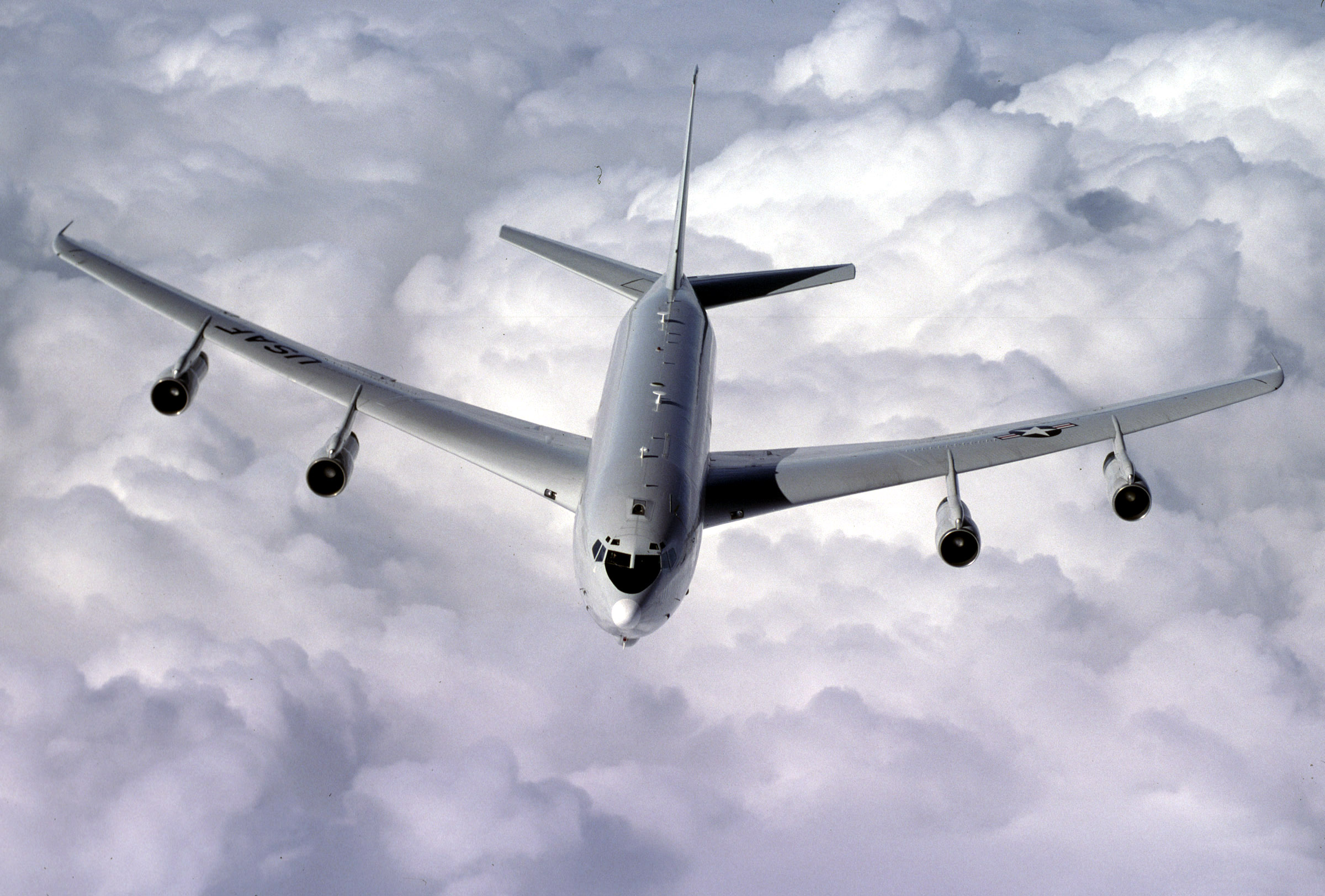
An E-8C Joint Surveillance Target Attack Radar System from the 93d Air Control Wing flies a refueling mission over the skies of Georgia.

While The 93d Wing had been inactivated in September 1995, the wing's history was too valuable, and Air Force leadership decided that it would rise in another guise. Just four months later it was redesignated as the 93d Air Control Wing (93 ACW), and was reactivated at Robins AFB, Georgia, on 29 January 1996. It was to be equipped with the Northrop Grumman E-8 Joint STARS (Joint Surveillance Target Attack Radar System), and it accepted its first production aircraft on 11 June 1996.

From late October through December 1996, the wing deployed to Rhein-Main Air Base, Germany for Operation Joint Endeavor and Operation Joint Guard, both in Bosnia and Herzegovina. It provided "top cover" for United Nations (UN) peacekeeping forces and monitored the warring factions for violations of UN resolutions. This deployment actually occurred before the wing had been declared as "Initial Operational Capable" by Air Combat Command, which took place on 18 December 1997.

As U.S. pressure on Iraq heightened in 1998, the 93d deployed an element to the Middle East to monitor Iraqi military movements. In February 1999 it deployed an aircraft to Europe to support NATO's monitoring of tensions between Serbia and Kosovo. The new wing saw its first combat during Operation Allied Force over Kosovo and Serbia, playing a major role in the destruction of enemy targets and compiling over 1,000 combat hours.

From November 2001 to April 2002, the wing deployed as part of Operation Enduring Freedom after the 11 September terrorist attacks on the United States.

The wing inactivated at Robins AFB on 30 September 2002. Its mission and resources became a part of Air Force history on that day as the Georgia Air National Guard's 116th Bomb Wing (now redesignated the 116th Air Control Wing (116th ACW)) assumed command responsibility for the Joint STARS mission and the first ever "blended wing", combining active-duty and Air National Guard personnel, aircraft, and facilities under one commander under the newly activated 116th ACW.

=== 93d Air Ground Operations Wing ===
The 93d Air Ground Operations Wing (93 AGOW) is a non-flying active support wing activated on 25 January 2008. The 93d's mission is to manage and providing combat-ready tactical air control party personnel, battlefield weather, and force protection assets for joint forces commanders. The wing is based at Moody AFB, Georgia.

== Lineage ==
- Constituted as the 93d Bombardment Wing, Very Heavy on 28 July 1947

Organized on 15 August 1947
Redesignated 93d Bombardment Wing, Medium on 12 July 1948
Redesignated 93d Bombardment Wing, Heavy on 1 February 1955
Redesignated 93d Wing on 1 September 1991
Redesignated 93d Bomb Wing on 1 June 1992
Inactivated on 30 September 1995

- Redesignated 93d Air Control Wing on 15 January 1996

Activated on 29 January 1996
Inactivated on 1 October 2002

- Redesignated 93d Air Ground Operations Wing on 11 December 2007

Activated on 25 January 2008

=== Assignments ===
- Fifteenth Air Force, 15 August 1947

Attached to 7th Air Division, 6 December 1951 – 6 March 1952

- 47th Air Division (later 47 Strategic Aerospace Division, 47 Air Division), 1 July 1959
- Second Air Force, 30 June 1971
- Fifteenth Air Force, 15 February 1973
- 14th Air Division, 1 October 1976
- 12th Air Division, 1 October 1985
- Fifteenth Air Force, 15 July 1988
- Twelfth Air Force, 1 June 1992 – 30 September 1995
- Ninth Air Force, 29 January 1996 – 1 October 2002
- Ninth Air Force, 25 January 2008 – present

=== Components ===
Groups

- 3d Air Support Operations Group (Fort Cavazos, Texas): January 2008 – present
- 5th Combat Weather Group (Fort Bragg, North Carolina): May 2022 – present
- 18th Air Support Operations Group (Pope Field, North Carolina): January 2008 – present
- 93d Bombardment Group: 15 August 1947 – 16 June 1952; 1 September 1991 – 31 October 1994; 29 January 1996 – 1 October 2002.
- 820th Base Defense Group (Moody AFB, Georgia): January 2008 – present

Squadrons

- 90th Air Refueling Squadron: 18 January 1954 – 5 August 1955 (detached c. 3 April – 18 May 1954 and 1 April – 16 July 1955).
- 93d Air Refueling Squadron: attached 15 July 1950 – 30 January 1951; attached 10 February 1951 – 15 June 1952, assigned 16 June 1952 – 1 September 1991 (detached c. 1 April – 15 May 1954; 29 June – 14 August 1954; 19 January – c. 15 March 1955; 18 June – c. 3 July 1955; 2 November 1955 – 5 January 1956; and 27 September – c. 24 December 1956).
- 328th Bombardment Squadron attached 10 February 1951 – 15 June 1952, assigned 16 June 1952 – 1 September 1991.
- 329th Bombardment Squadron (later, 329th Strategic Bombardment Training Squadron; 329th Combat Crew Training Squadron): attached 10 February 1951 – 15 June 1952, assigned 16 June 1952 – 30 September 1971; 1 July 1986 – 1 September 1991.
- 330th Bombardment Squadron (later, 330th Combat Flight Instructor Squadron): attached 10 February 1951 – 15 June 1952, assigned 16 June 1952 – 15 September 1963; 24 August 1988 – 1 September 1991.
- 340th Air Refueling Squadron: attached 20 October 1952 – 18 January 1954.
- 341st Air Refueling Squadron: attached 11 June 1954 – 15 August 1955.
- 924th Air Refueling Squadron: 1 July 1959 – 1 September 1991.
- 4017th Combat Crew Training Squadron: 8 January 1955 – c. 1 July 1986

=== Bases ===
- Castle Field, California, 15 August 1947 – 12 January 1948
- Castle Air Force Base, California, 13 January 1948 – 30 September 1995
- Robins Air Force Base, Georgia, 29 January 1996 – 1 October 2002
- Moody Air Force Base, Georgia, 29 January 2008 – present

=== Aircraft ===
- B-50 (1947–1954)
- KC-97G (1953–1957)
- B-47E (1954–1956)
- KC-135A (1957–1992)
- KC-135R (1986–1992)
- B-52B (1955–1965)
- B-52D (1956–1974)
- B-52E (1957–1970)
- B-52F (1958–1974)
- B-52G (1966–1994)
- B-52H (1974–1993)
- E-8C Joint STARS (1996–2002)

== See also ==
- List of B-50 units of the United States Air Force
- List of B-47 units of the United States Air Force
- List of B-52 Units of the United States Air Force
- David Wade, deputy commander of the 93rd from 1950 to 1951
