= 93rd Air Refueling Squadron =

US Air Force unit

93rd Air Refueling Squadron

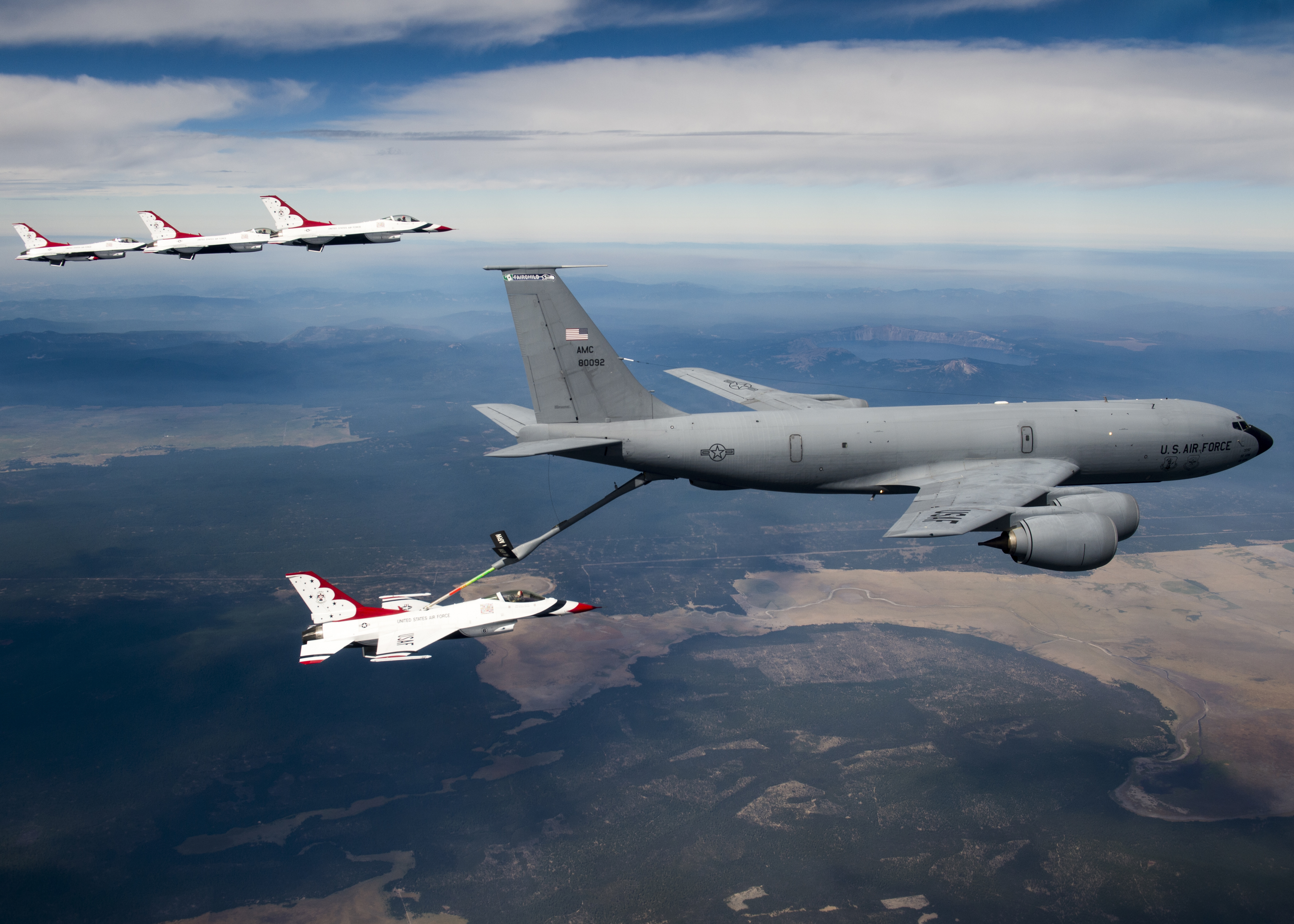
- 92nd Air Refueling Wing KC-135 Stratotanker refueling the Thunderbirds
- Active: 1942–1946; 1949–1995; 1995–present
- Country: United States
- Branch: United States Air Force
- Role: Aerial refueling
- Part of: Air Mobility Command
- Garrison/HQ: Fairchild Air Force Base, WA
- Nickname: Vanguards (World War II)
- Motto: Domini Artis (Latin for 'Masters of the Art') (1995-present)
- Engagements: China-Burma-India Theater; Kosovo War; Desert Storm
- Decorations: Distinguished Unit Citation; Air Force Meritorious Unit Award; Air Force Outstanding Unit Award

Insignia
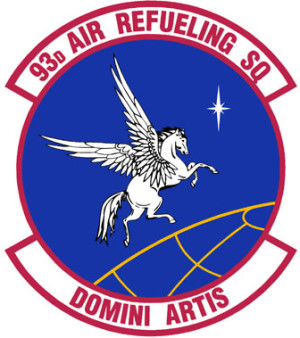
- 93rd Air Refueling Squadron emblem (Note: Approved 9 December 1994. Description: Azure, a Pegasus ascending bendwise sinister Argent above a demi-globe issuant from sinister base of the first [color] gridlined Or, a mullet of eight in sinister chief White, all within a diminished bordure Gules.)

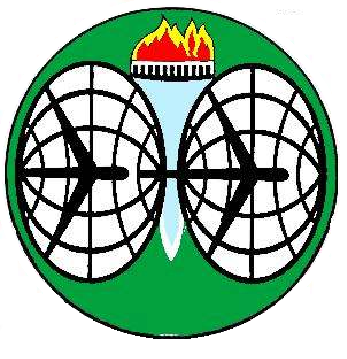
- 93rd Air Refueling Squadron emblem (Note: This emblem never received official approval, but was used by the squadron from the late 1950s until 1995 when it was a training unit for SAC KC-135 aircrews.)

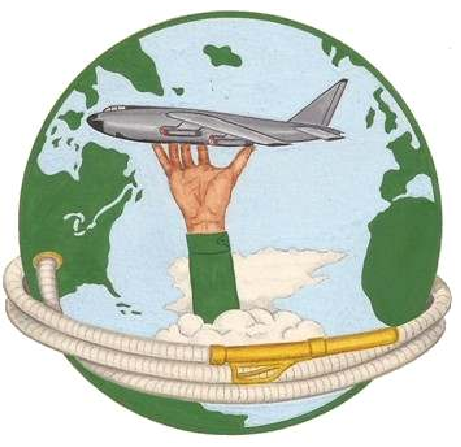
- 93rd Air Refueling Squadron emblem (Note: Approved 22 June 1955.)

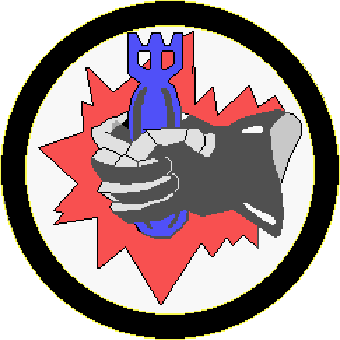
- 493rd Bombardment Squadron emblem

Aircraft flown
- Tanker: KC-135 Stratotanker

The 93rd Air Refueling Squadron is an active United States Air Force unit, stationed at Fairchild Air Force Base, Washington, where it is assigned to the 92nd Operations Group and operates the Boeing KC-135 Stratotanker aircraft conducting air refueling missions.

The earliest predecessor of the squadron is the 493rd Bombardment Squadron, which was activated in India in October 1942 and was equipped with Consolidated B-24 Liberators in January 1943. It participated in combat in the China Burma India Theater with the Liberator until V-J Day, earning a Distinguished Unit Citation in March 1945. Dring the period in which Boeing B-29 Superfortress bombers operated from India, it also transported gasoline to forward bases in China. After the end of hostilities, it returned to the United States for inactivation in January 1946.

The 93rd Air Refueling Squadron was activated in March 1949 and equipped with Boeing KB-29 Superfortress tankers. It upgraded to the Boeing KC-97 Stratofreighter in 1953, and the KC-135 in 1957. For most of its time at Castle Air Force Base, California, it served as the training unit for KC-135 aircrews, but also maintained combat readiness to execute Strategic Air Command (SAC) missions. In September 1985 the two squadrons were consolidated into a single unit. When SAC inactivated in 1992, the squadron became part of Air Mobility Command. In March 1995, the squadron was inactivated at Castle, but activated the same day at Fairchild, where it assumed the personnel of another unit.

== Mission ==
The squadron provides air refueling, as well as rapid and reliable passenger and cargo airlift and aeromedical evacuation. It supports U.S. and coalition conventional operations and United States Strategic Command strategic deterrence missions. It deploys expeditionary combat support forces to support worldwide contingency requirements.

== History ==
=== World War II ===
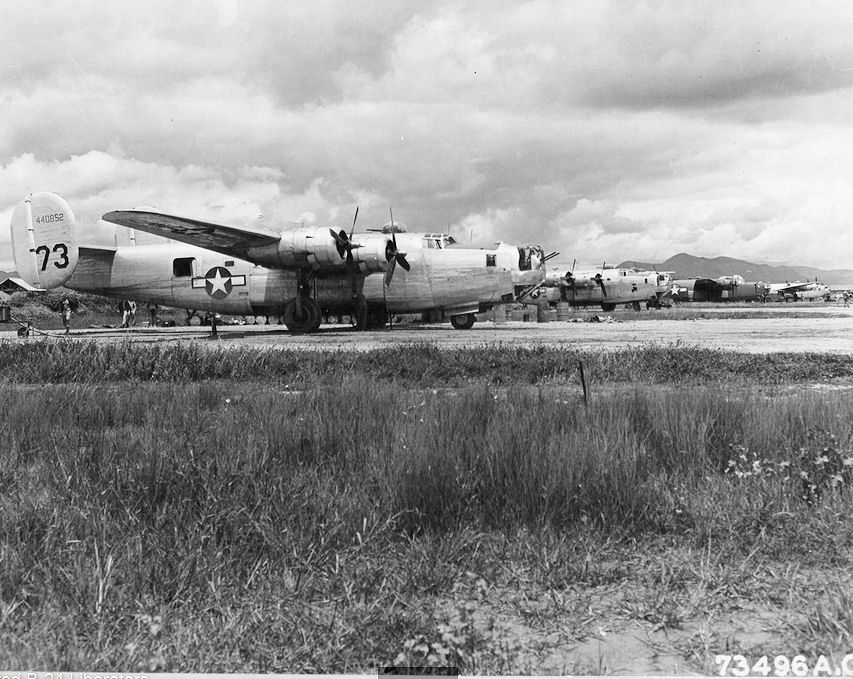
7th Bombardment Group B-24 Liberators, Panagarh Airfield, India, 1943

The 7th Bombardment Group was deploying to the Philippines when the Japanese struck Pearl Harbor. With the air bases in the Philippines in Japanese hands, it engaged in combat in Australia and the Netherlands East Indies. By late spring 1942, it had moved to India. In India, it was assigned two medium bomber squadrons, the 11th and 22d Bombardment Squadrons, and two heavy bomber squadrons, the 9th and 436th Bombardment Squadrons. In September, the two medium squadrons were reassigned to form the cadre for the new 341st Bombardment Group, while the 492nd and 493rd Bombardment Squadrons were organized to take their places and make the 7th Group an all heavy bomber unit.

The 493rd Bombardment Squadron was activated at Camp Malir near Karachi, India (now Pakistan). It initially was nominally manned, but after moving to Pandaveswar Airfield, India in January 1943, it drew its cadre from the 9th Bombardment Squadron and received substantial manning by the end of the month. The squadron flew its first combat mission on 26 January 1943 when it bombed docks, shipping, and warehouses at Rangoon, Burma.

The squadron engaged in strategic bombardment operations, primarily directed against Japanese forces in Burma. with attacks on airfields, fuel and supply dumps, docks, shipping and warehouses. In particular the Burmese rail system was a focus with attacks on railways, locomotive works, and bridges. The squadron also attacked oil refineries and railroads in Thailand and power production facilities in China. It conducted strikes on enemy shipping in the Andaman Sea.

As the 1944 monsoon began in June, the squadron moved to Tezgaon Airfield, India (now Bangla Desh). There, it ceased combat operations and began ferrying fuel over the Hump to Fourteenth Air Force in China. Supply operations continued until September, when it returned to Pandaveswar. On 27 December a detachment of the squadron moved to Luliang Airfield, China, where it resumed airlift operations, hauling gasoline to Suichwan Airfield, China until late January 1945.

The squadron began practice with VB-1 Azon ("Azimuth only") controllable bombs. B-24s using the Azon were specially equipped with electronics to control the bombs. Azon bombs were radio controlled and could be steered left or right, although their trajectory could not be changed to shorten or lengthen their flight to target. The VB-1 was particularly suited to long and narrow targets like bridges or railways where range errors would be irrelevant. For this reason, the squadron used them almost exclusively for attacks on bridges. 27 bridges in Burma were destroyed with the bomb, including the Bridge on the River Kwai. Perhaps the greatest success with the VB-1 was on 27 December 1944, when 9 of the bombs destroyed the rail bridge at Pyinmana, Burma, which had stood despite a rain of thousands of bombs in the two previous years. On 30 December 1944, the squadron launched four B-24s equipped with Azon bombs along with two regular Liberators. The primary target was the Nyaungchudauk bridge in Burma with its bypass bridge as the first alternate target and the Taungup bridge as second alternate. Direct hits demolished the primary and bypass bridge. The regular B-24s failed in their attempt to destroy the nearby Okshitpin bridge, but the Azon crews destroyed it in two passes. The Azon equipped planes then crossed the mountains to drop a span of the Taungup road bridge. In all, four major bridges were disabled with a few Azon bombs still remaining. The squadron made its first Azon attack on 27 December 1944.

On 19 March, the 493rd earned a Distinguished Unit Citation for attacks against rail lines and bridges in Thailand. The squadron also dropped propaganda leaflets in Thailand from June through September 1945 for the Office of War Information.

After V-J Day the 493rd Squadron staged through Dudhkundi Airfield, India, Kanchrapara Airfield, India, and Camp Angus (near Calcutta), India, departing Calcutta aboard the USS General W. M. Black on 7 December 1945. The vessel reached the Port of Embarkation on 5 January 1946 and the squadron inactivated at Camp Kilmer, New Jersey, the following day

=== Strategic Air Command ===
==== KB-29 operations ====
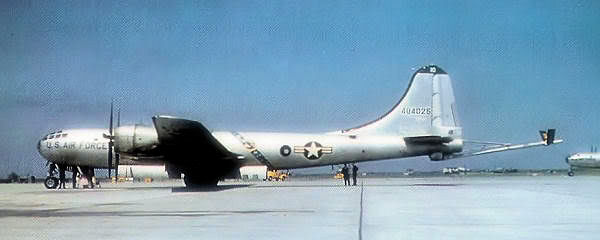
KB-29 as flown by the squadron

The second predecessor of the squadron was the 93rd Air Refueling Squadron, which activated at Castle Air Force Base, California on 1 March 1949 and was assigned to the 93rd Bombardment Group. The squadron remained unmanned for over a year, finally receiving personnel in September 1950. It started receiving Boeing KB-29 Superfortress tankers the following month, but was not considered combat ready until October 1951. It primarily provided air refueling for the 93rd Bombardment Wing's bombers for their wartime mission, training, exercises and overseas deployments. The 93rd deployed with its KB-29s to RAF Upper Heyford, England from 6 Dec 1951 to 6 Mar 1952. In June 1952, the squadron was reassigned from the 93rd Bombardment Group, which had not been operational since February 1951, directly to the 93rd Bombardment Wing. The squadron supported Operation Fox Peter II, the movement of the 31st Fighter-Escort Wing from the United States to Japan, in July 1952 using KB-29Ps flying from Guam and Kwajalein to refuel 58 Republic F-84G Thunderjet fighters on their way to the Korean War.

==== KC-97 operations ====
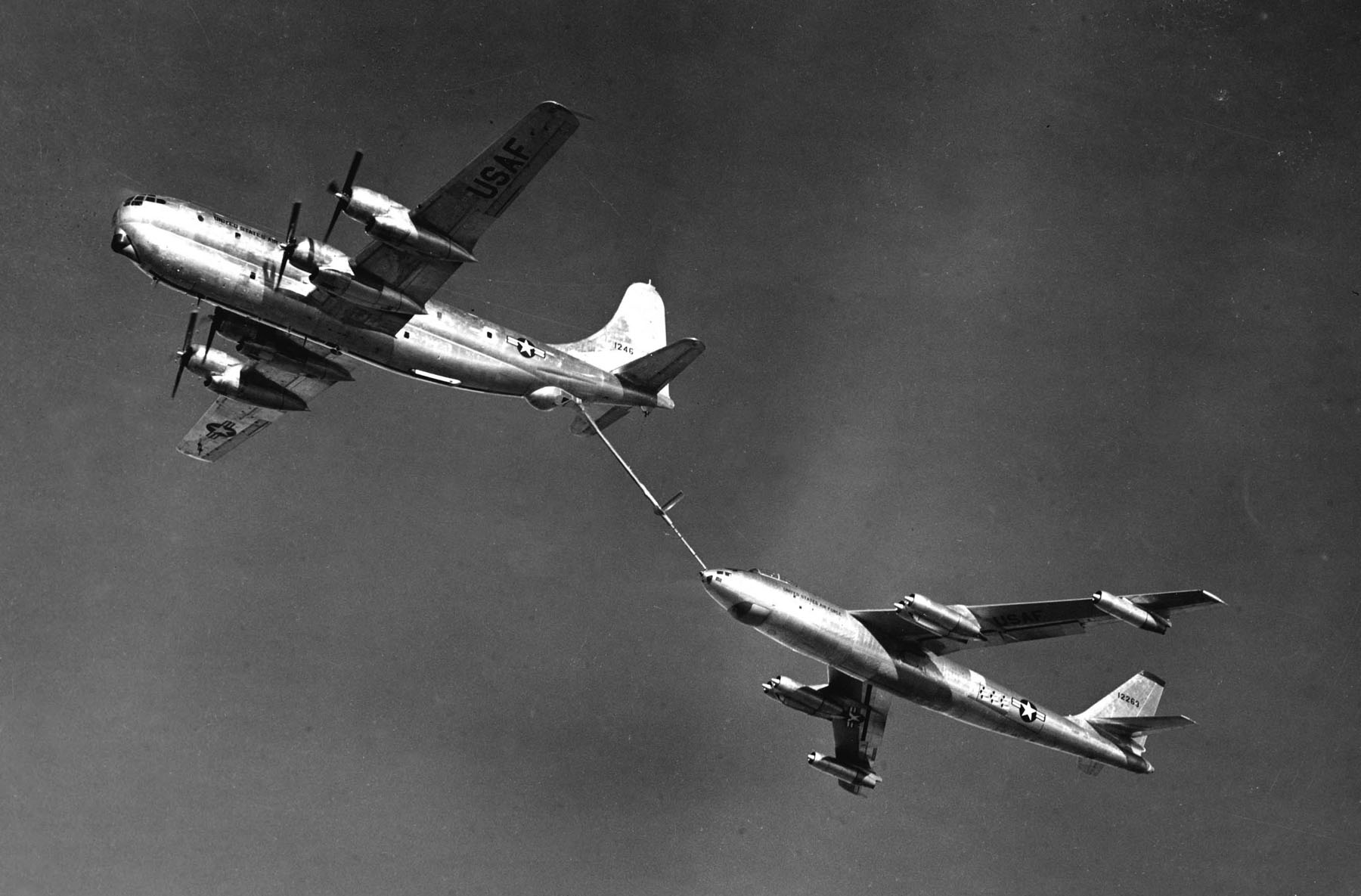
KC-97F Stratofreighter refueling a B-47B

The squadron began to convert from KB-29s to Boeing KC-97 Stratofreighters in November 1953 and completed the conversion in December. The squadron frequently deployed its tankers, beginning with a deployment to Davis-Monthan Air Force Base, Arizona from 1 April to 15 May 1954. It deployed twice to forward locations overseas, including to Ernest Harmon Air Force Base, Newfoundland, from 19 June to 14 August 1954 and to Thule Air Base, Greenland, from 19 January to March 1955. It also deployed twice to Elmendorf Air Force Base, Alaska, from 2 November 1955 to 5 January 1956 and from 27 September to December 1956. The 93rd began training its aircrews to operate Boeing KC-135 Stratotankers in May 1957.

==== KC-135 operations ====
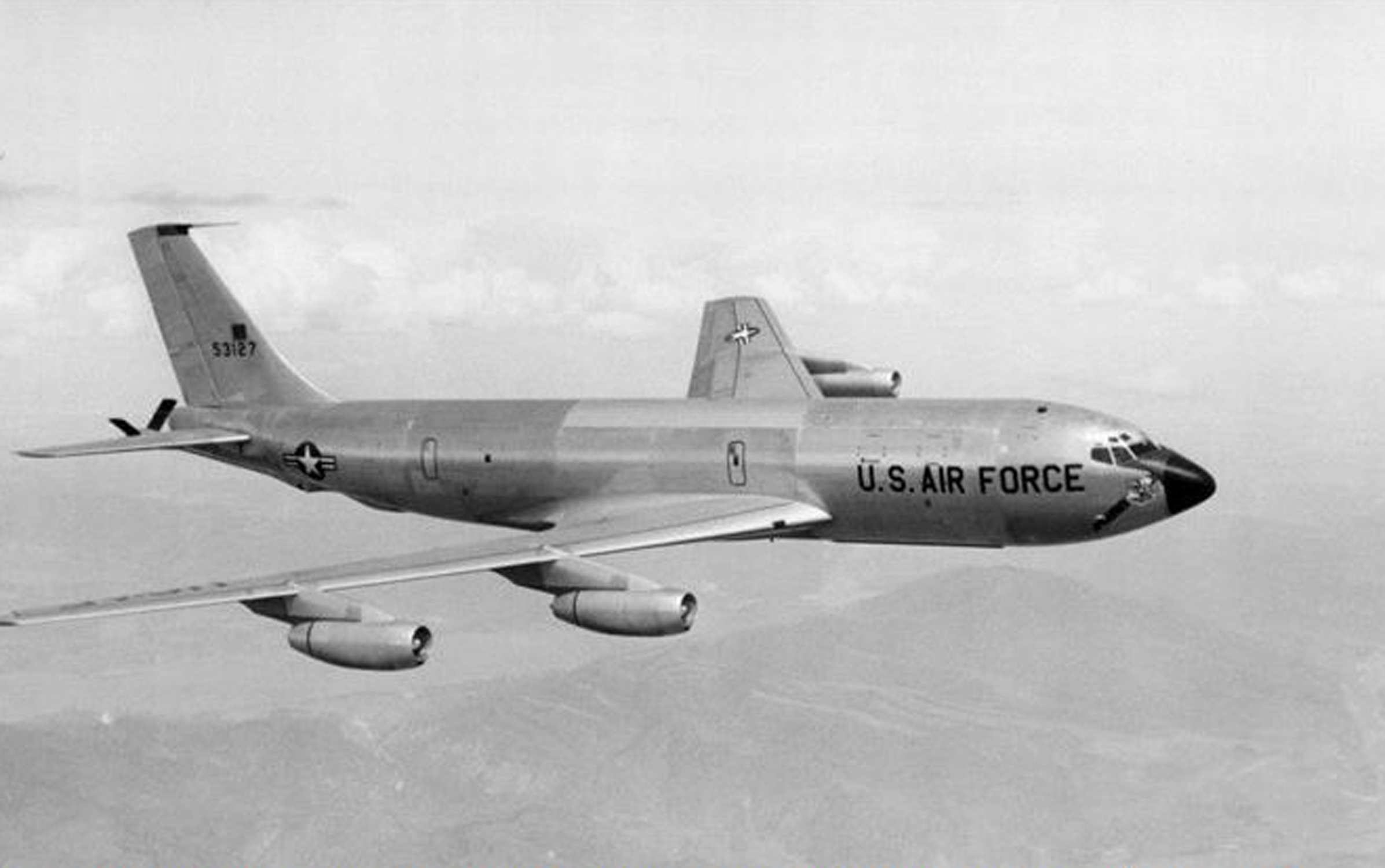
Squadron KC-135 in 1957 (Note: Aircraft is Boeing KC-135A-BN Stratotanker, The City of Renton, serial 55-3127. This was the first KC-135 assigned to SAC and the squadron. It was later converted to a test aircraft as a JKC-135A (later NKC-135A). It was sent to the Aerospace Maintenance and Regeneration Center on 31 August 1992. Dirkx, Marco (6 May 2024). "1955 USAF Serial Numbers". Joe Baugher's Serial Number List.)

The squadron was the first Stratotanker squadron in the Air Force. Shortly after converting to the Stratotanker, it assumed KC-135 aircrew training as primary mission. On 1 July 1959, the 924th Air Refueling Squadron was activated at Castle, drawing its cadre from the 93rd and assuming the training mission. SAC's commander, General Thomas S. Power, had established an initial goal of maintaining one third of SAC's planes on fifteen minute ground alert, fully fueled and ready for combat to reduce vulnerability to a Soviet missile strike, and the squadron began placing aircraft on alert. The SAC alert commitment increased to half the squadron's aircraft in 1962.

Soon after 1962 detection of Soviet missiles in Cuba, SAC brought all degraded and adjusted alert sorties were up to full capability. As SAC launched 1/8 of its Boeing B-52 Stratofortresses on airborne alert, additional KC-135 were placed on alert to replace KC-135s devoted to refueling the airborne B-52 bombers. On 24 October SAC went to DEFCON 2, placing all aircraft on alert. On 27 November SAC returned to normal alert posture.

On 21 August 1963, the 93rd ceased standing alert and on 26 August again began KC-135 aircrew training as its primary mission, it routinely supported Alaskan, European, and Pacific tanker task forces. It refueled wing B-52s to support their wartime taskings; and other US Air Force, Navy, and Marine aircraft for routine training, operations, exercises, and worldwide contingencies that required tanker support, but did not stand alert. (Note: The cited source claims the return to the training mission was because the 924th was inactivated, but Ravenstein shows it continued to be assigned to the 93rd Wing, Ravenstein, p. 130, and Mueller shows it remained at Castle AFB. Muelller, p.76.) The squadron also provided specialized training of shorter duration to senior officers (such as wing commanders). For a period the 93rd also sent instructor teams to locations where Air Force Reserve and Air National Guard units were converting to KC-135 tanker operations to help in-house training programs. On 1 September 1991, SAC reorganized its wings in the Objective Wing reorganization, and the squadron was reassigned to the 93rd Operations Group.

=== Air Mobility Command ===
In June 1992, the Air Force reorganized its major commands, inactivating SAC. The 93rd Wing and its support and heavy bomber units, was assigned to the new Air Combat Command, while its refueling units, including the 93rd, became part of Air Mobility Command (AMC), which activated the 398th Operations Group at Castle as the headquarters for refueling units there.

The 1995 Base Realignment and Closure Commission (BRAC) directed closure of Castle. In addition, BRAC directed AMC to move its tanker training to Tinker Air Force Base, Oklahoma, where its 97th Air Mobility Wing was already conducting airlift crew training. AMC activated the 55th Air Refueling Squadron at Tinker to conduct this training. On 31 Mar 1995, the 93rd was inactivated at Castle, but was activated the same day at Fairchild Air Force Base, Washington, where it assumed the mission, personnel and equipment of the 96th Air Refueling Squadron, which was inactivated. At Fairchild, the 93rd was assigned to the 92nd Operations Group.

Following the 11 September 2001 terrorist attacks, the squadron deployed tankers and aircrew that refueled combat aircraft for Operations Noble Eagle, Enduring Freedom, and Iraqi Freedom. During a 2013 deployment to Manas Air Base, Kyrgyzstan, a crew from the squadron perished when their KC-135 crashed near Chaldovar.

== Lineage ==
493rd Bombardment Squadron

- Constituted as the 493rd Bombardment Squadron (Heavy) on 19 September 1942

Activated on 25 October 1942
Redesignated 493rd Bombardment Squadron, Heavy on 6 March 1944
Inactivated on 6 January 1946

- Consolidated with the 93rd Air Refueling Squadron as the 93rd Air Refueling Squadron on 19 September 1985

93rd Air Refueling Squadron
Constituted as the 93rd Air Refueling Squadron, Medium on 2 February 1949
Activated on 1 March 1949
Redesignated 93rd Air Refueling Squadron, Heavy on 1 February 1955

- Consolidated with the 493rd Bombardment Squadron on 19 September 1985

Redesignated 93rd Air Refueling Squadron on 1 September 1991
Inactivated on 31 March 1995

- Activated on 31 March 1995

=== Assignments ===
- 7th Bombardment Group, 25 October 1942 – 6 January 1946
- 93rd Bombardment Group, 1 March 1949 (attached to 93rd Bombardment Wing, 15 July 1950 – 30 January 1951 and after 10 February 1951)
- 93rd Bombardment Wing, 16 June 1952
- 93rd Operations Group, 1 September 1991
- 398th Operations Group, 1 June 1992 – 31 March 1995
- 92nd Operations Group, 31 March 1995 – present

=== Stations ===
- Camp Malir, Karachi, India, 25 October 1942
- Pandaveswar Airfield, India, 7 January 1943
- Tezgaon Airfield, India, 17 June 1944
- Pandaveswar Airfield, India, 5 October 1944 (detachment at Luliang Airfield, China 17 December 1944 – 26 January 1945)
- Dudhkundi Airfield, India, 31 October 1945
- Kanchrapara Airfield, India, 19 November 1945
- Camp Angus, Calcutta, India, 25 November – 7 December 1945
- Camp Kilmer, New Jersey, 5–6 January 1946
- Castle Air Force Base, California, 1 March 1949 – 31 March 1995 (deployed to RAF Upper Heyford, England, 9 December 1951 – 6 March 1952; Davis-Monthan Air Force Base, Arizona 1 April – 15 May 1954; Ernest Harmon Air Force Base, Newfoundland, 19 June – 14 August 1954; Thule Air Base, Greenland, 19 January – c. 15 March 1955; Elmendorf Air Force Base, Alaska, 2 November 1955 – 5 January 1956, 27 September – c. 24 December 1956)
- Fairchild Air Force Base, Washington, 31 March 1995 – present

=== Aircraft ===
- Consolidated B-24 Liberator (1943–1945)
- Boeing KB-29 Superfortress (1950–1953)
- Boeing KC-97 Stratofreighter (1953–1957)
- Boeing KC-135 Stratotanker (1957–1995, 1995–present)

=== Awards and campaigns ===
Award streamer	Award	Dates	Notes
	Distinguished Unit Citation	19 March 1945	Thailand, 493rd Bombardment Squadron
	Air Force Meritorious Unit Award	1 June 2003–31 December 2005	93rd Air Refueling Squadron
	Air Force Meritorious Unit Award	1 September 2012–31 August 2013	93rd Air Refueling Squadron
	Air Force Outstanding Unit Award	1 January 1956–1 July 1959	93rd Air Refueling Squadron
	Air Force Outstanding Unit Award	1 June 1962–1 April 1963	93rd Air Refueling Squadron
	Air Force Outstanding Unit Award	1 April 1973–30 June 1974	93rd Air Refueling Squadron
	Air Force Outstanding Unit Award	1 July 1983–30 June 1985	93rd Air Refueling Squadron
	Air Force Outstanding Unit Award	1 July 1988–30 June 1990	93rd Air Refueling Squadron
	Air Force Outstanding Unit Award	2 August 1990–11 April 1991	93rd Air Refueling Squadron
	Air Force Outstanding Unit Award	1 July 1995–30 June 1997	93rd Air Refueling Squadron
	Air Force Outstanding Unit Award	1 January 1998–30 June 1999	93rd Air Refueling Squadron
	Air Force Outstanding Unit Award	24 March 1999–10 June 1999	93rd Air Refueling Squadron
	Air Force Outstanding Unit Award	1 June 2001–31 May 2003	93rd Air Refueling Squadron
	Air Force Outstanding Unit Award	1 January 2006–31 August 2007	93rd Air Refueling Squadron
	Air Force Outstanding Unit Award	1 September 2007–31 August 2008	93rd Air Refueling Squadron
	Air Force Outstanding Unit Award	1 August 2009–31 July 2011	93rd Air Refueling Squadron
	Air Force Outstanding Unit Award	[1] August 2011–31 August 2012	93rd Air Refueling Squadron
	Air Force Outstanding Unit Award	1 September 2013–31 August 2014	93rd Air Refueling Squadron
	Air Force Outstanding Unit Award	1 September 2014–31 August 2015	93rd Air Refueling Squadron
	Air Force Outstanding Unit Award	1 September 2015–31 August 2017	93rd Air Refueling Squadron
	Air Force Outstanding Unit Award	1 September 2017–31 August 2018	93rd Air Refueling Squadron
	Air Force Outstanding Unit Award	1 September 2018–31 August 2019	93rd Air Refueling Squadron
	Air Force Outstanding Unit Award	1 September 2019–31 August 2020	93rd Air Refueling Squadron

Campaign Streamer	Campaign	Dates	Notes
	China Defensive	25 October 1942–4 May 1945	493rd Bombardment Squadron
	India-Burma	2 April 1943–28 January 1945	493rd Bombardment Squadron
	Central Burma	29 January 1945–15 July 1945	493rd Bombardment Squadron
	Liberation and Defense of Kuwait	17 January 1991–11 April 1991	93rd Air Refueling Squadron
	Air Campaign	24 March 1999–10 March 1999	93rd Air Refueling Squadron
	Global War on Terror Service	11 September 2001–	93rd Air Refueling Squadron

== See also ==
- List of United States Air Force air refueling squadrons
- B-24 Liberator units of the United States Army Air Forces
- List of B-29 Superfortress operators
- Tail stripe
