= Mariposa-Yosemite Airport =

Airport in California, United States

Mariposa-Yosemite Airport Mariposa Air Force Auxiliary Field
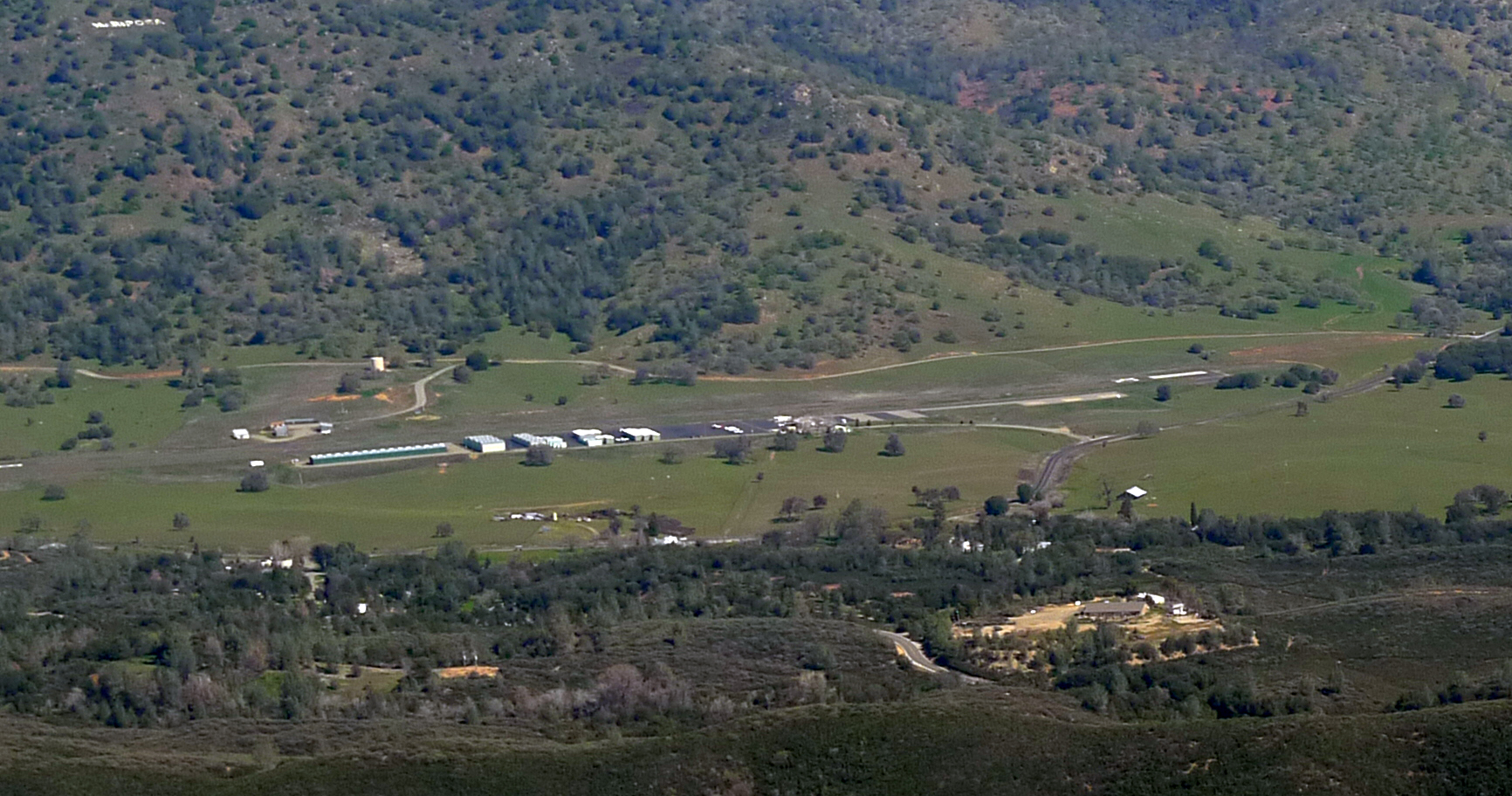
- 2015 aerial photo
- IATA: RMY; ICAO: KMPI; FAA LID: MPI

Summary
- Airport type: Public
- Owner: County of Mariposa
- Location: Mariposa, California
- Elevation AMSL: 2,254 ft / 687 m
- Coordinates: 37°30′39″N 120°02′22″W

Map
- Location of Mariposa-Yosemite Airport

Runways
Direction	Length		Surface
Direction	ft	m	Surface
8/26	3,306	1,008	Asphalt

Statistics (2007)
- Aircraft operations: 32,000
- Based aircraft: 52
- Source: Federal Aviation Administration

Mariposa-Yosemite Airport (IATA: RMY, ICAO: KMPI, FAA LID: MPI, formerly O68) is a public airport located four miles (6 km) west of the central business district of Mariposa, in Mariposa County, California, United States. It is owned by the County of Mariposa.

Although most U.S. airports use the same three-letter location identifier for the FAA and IATA, Mariposa-Yosemite Airport is assigned MPI by the FAA and RMY by the IATA (which assigned MPI to Mamitupo, Panama).

== Facilities and aircraft ==
Mariposa-Yosemite Airport covers an area of 100 acres (40 ha) which contains one asphalt paved runway (8/26) measuring 3,306 x 60 ft (1,008 x 18 m).

For the 12-month period ending March 2, 2007, the Mariposa-Yosemite airport had 32,000 aircraft operations, an average of 87 per day: 94% general aviation and 6% air taxi. There are 52 aircraft based at this airport: 96% single engine, 2% multi-engine and 2% ultralight.

There is one FBO on the field, Airborrn Aviation Services.

== World War II ==
During World War II, the airport was designated as Mariposa Air Force Auxiliary Field, and was an auxiliary training airfield for Merced Army Airfield, California.

== See also ==
- California World War II Army Airfields

== Images ==
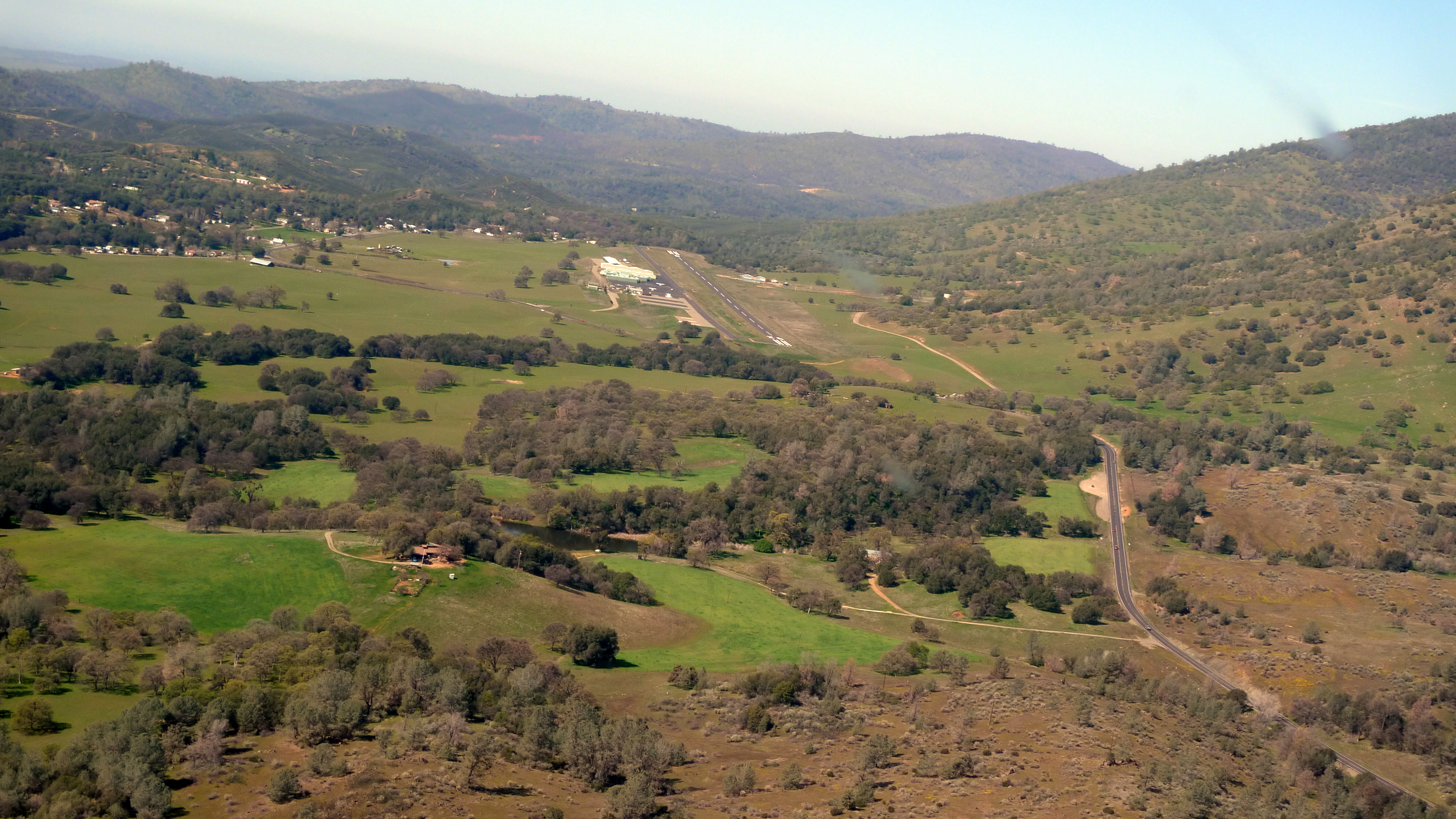
Mariposa Yosemite Airport base leg

In July 2022, five CH-54s were assigned to fighting the Washburn Fire, based at the Mariposa-Yosemite Airport.

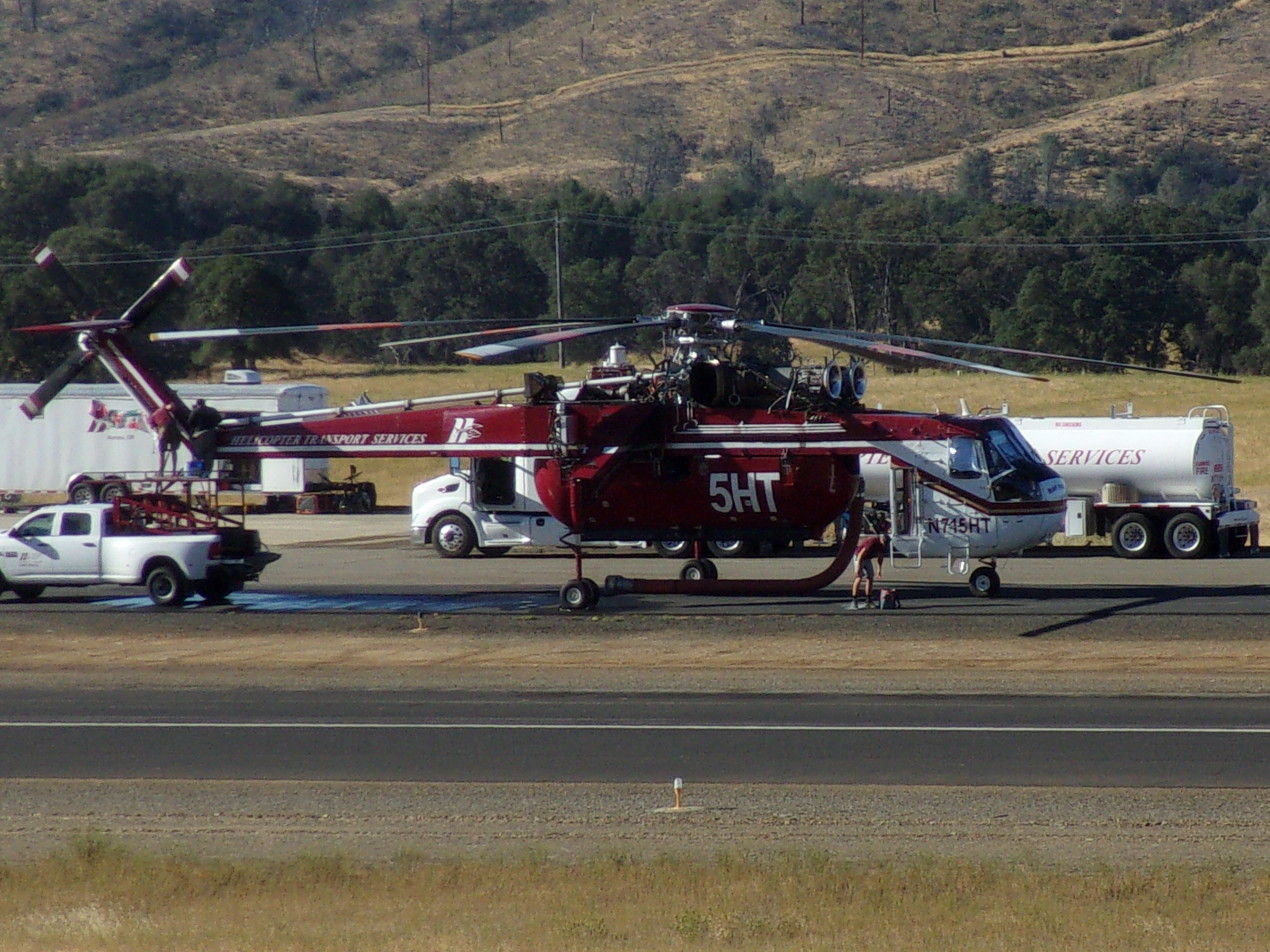
N715HT on duty in Mariposa, California working on the Washburn Fire

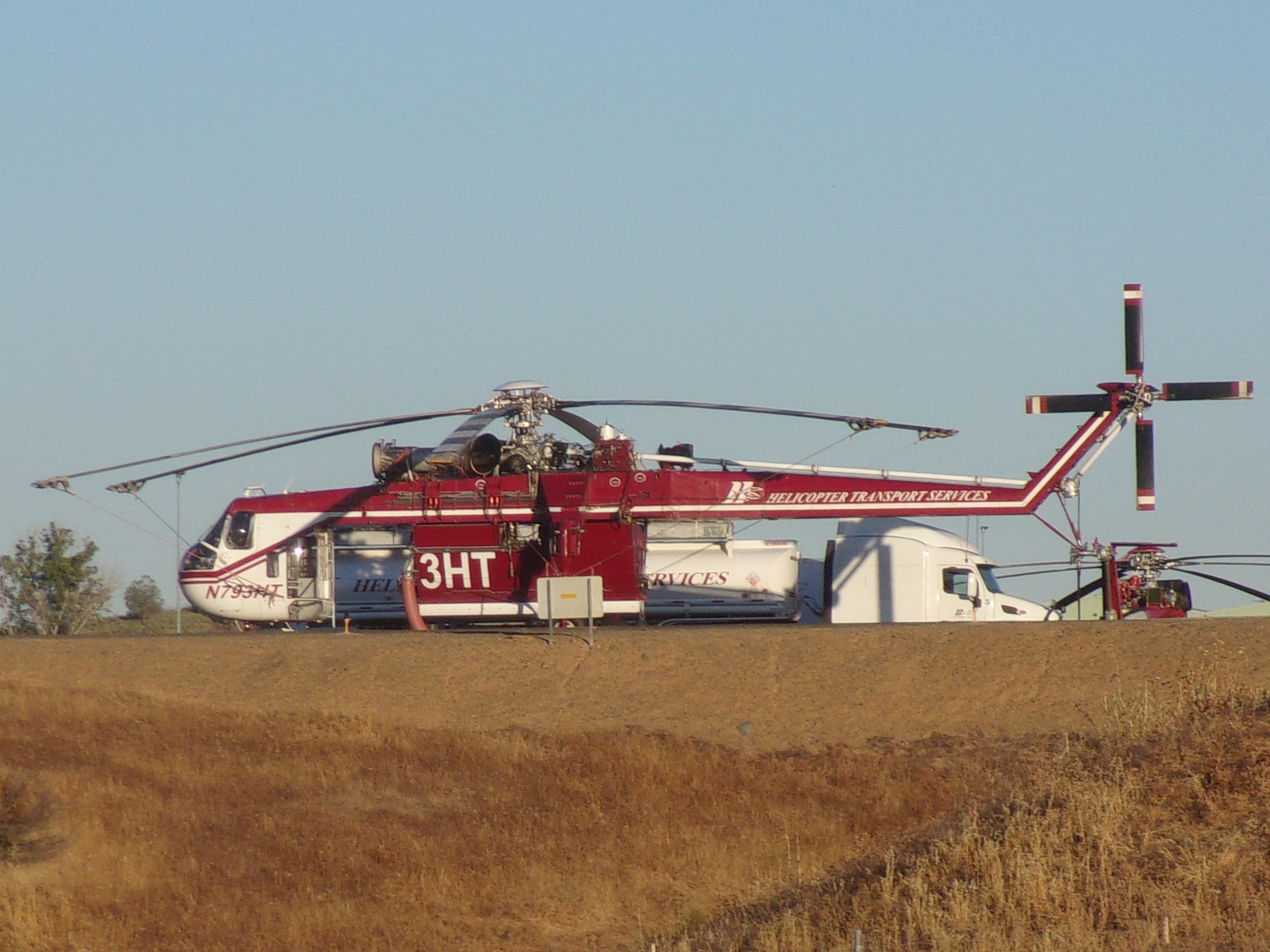
N793HT on duty in Mariposa, California working on the Washburn Fire

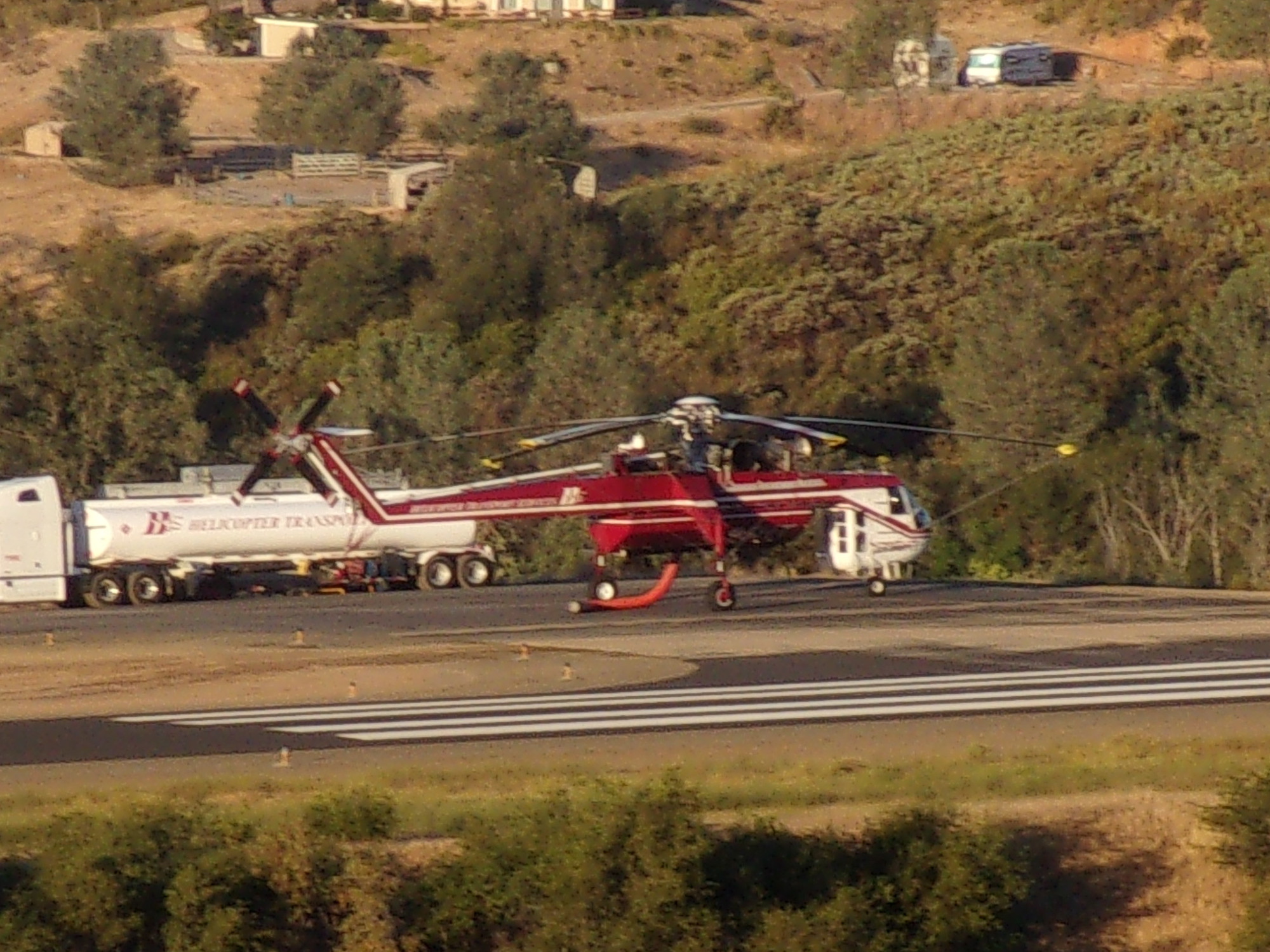
N795HT on duty in Mariposa, California working on the Washburn Fire

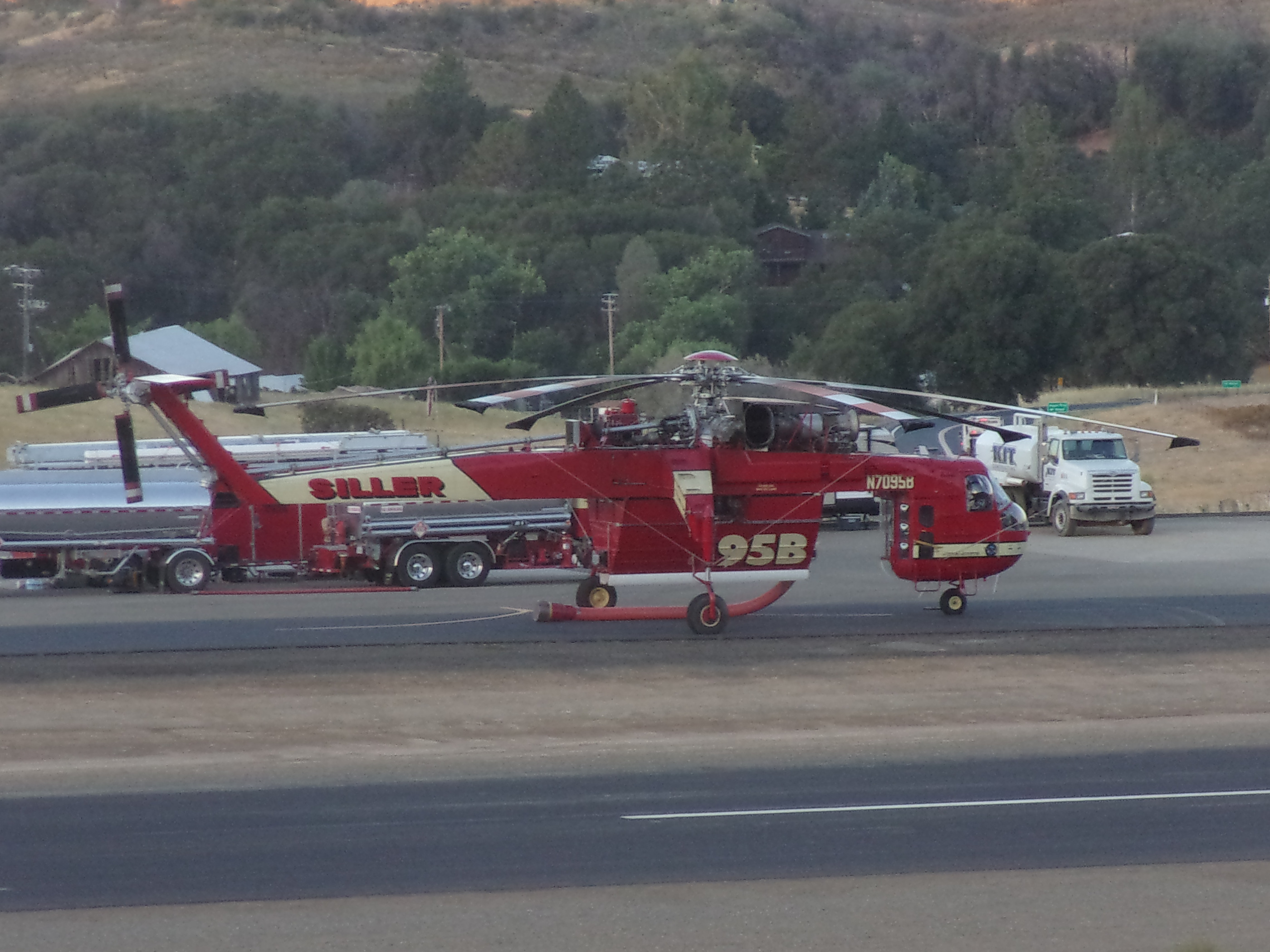
N7095B on duty in Mariposa, California working on the Washburn Fire

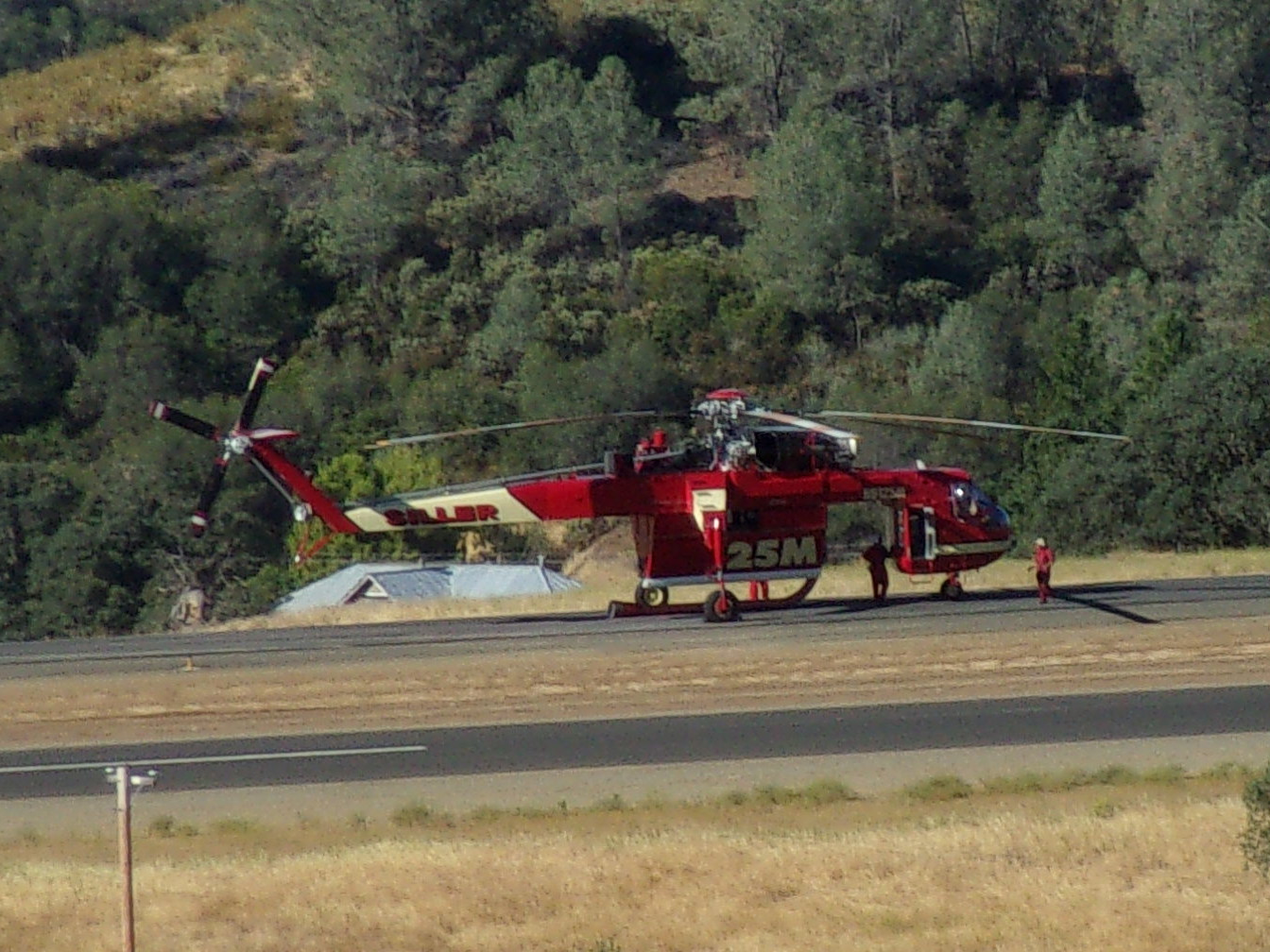
N9125M on duty in Mariposa, California working on the Washburn Fire
