= California during World War II =

Map of California

California in United States

California was a major contributor to the World War II effort. After the Japanese attack on Pearl Harbor, the majority of manufacturing in California shifted to accommodate the war effort, causing the state to become a major ship builder and aircraft manufacturer, along with expanding oil and mineral production. Agriculture, ranches, and farms were used to feed the troops around the world.

Existing military installations were enlarged and many new ones were built to keep up with the demand. The state trained many of the troops before their oversea deployment, causing the population to grow significantly. Along with the servicemen stationed at the new military bases and training facilities, there was a mass influx of people from around the U.S. coming to work in the growing defense industries. Over 800,000 Californians served in the United States Armed Forces. With all the new economic activity, California was lifted out of the Great Depression. Over 500,000 people moved there from other states to work in the growing economy.

California's long coastline along the Pacific Ocean provided support needed for the Pacific War, but was also seen as a vulnerability, as an attack seemed likely. Because of growing anxiety surrounding potential attacks, the state was used for the temporary and permanent internment camps for Japanese Americans.

== History ==
=== Economics and population growth ===
A total of 12% of all U.S. government war contracts were awarded to California companies. A total of 17% of the war materials were made in California. Mining, natural gas, and oil production were active industries in California before World War II, and these rapidly expanded to support the war effort. Like in World War I, the mines and mining towns came to life again, due to an increase in demand for gold, copper, and silver. The oil production doubled, and the synthetic rubber industry and agricultural output nearly tripled. In 1941 California oil production was 230,263,000 barrels; by the end of the war in 1945 the output was 326,555,000 barrels. Raw material was also shipped to California from Lend lease U.S. Allies.

After America entered the war, there was a quick build of new military bases, airfields, training camps, and other military installations. New military construction projects and the emerging war industries in California brought in tens of thousands of workers from across America. After the war, many stayed in California, with some others returning to their home states. Towns and cities next to military and industrial facilities grew and had an increase in the economy. California's population in 1940 was 6,907,387 and by 1950 it had grown to 10,586,223, a 53.3% increase. California received one eighth of all war orders. With the manpower shortage, many women entered the workforce in manufacturing and other jobs held by men in the past. As factories added more shifts, a variety of stores and services increase operating hours. To retain workers, some businesses increased their employee benefits. Many military personnel who were trained in California returned after the war to tour the state, so California's tourist industries began to grow.

=== Food production ===
California's mild climate made it ideal for year-round food production. With many men overseas, there were labor shortages at harvest time. The need for extra workers at harvest brought in housewives and students. Some businesses even loaned workers to help with harvest and food packing as needed. The Woman's Land Army of America was one of the organizations helping in food production. Even with the increase in food production, there was mandatory food rationing. Civilians were encouraged to plant Victory gardens to help with the food shortage. The slogan "grow your own, can your own", was started during the war, and referred to families growing and canning their own food in victory gardens. With its mild climate, most victory gardens were grown almost year-round. Along with food, tires, gasoline, and wool fabric were rationed. The rationing of wool became one of the causes of the June 1943 Zoot Suit Riots in Los Angeles.

=== Enemy aliens ===
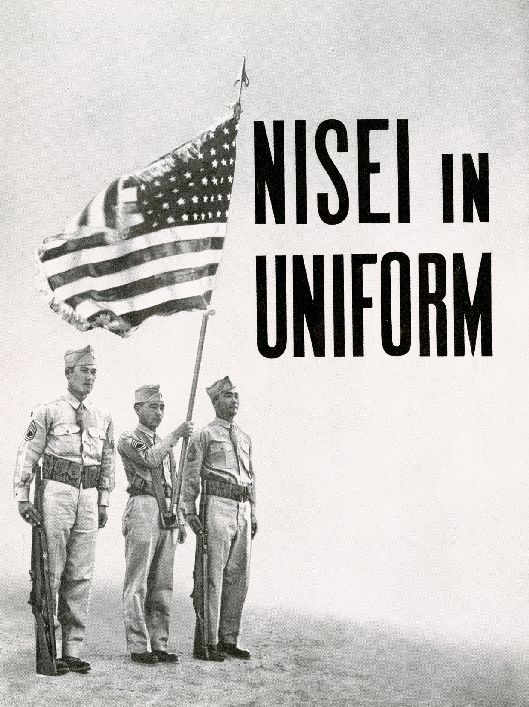
US Army promotional pamphlet for Japanese-Americans

- After the attack on Pearl Harbor it was feared that some Japanese Americans might be loyal to Japan. On February 19, 1942, President Franklin D. Roosevelt signed Executive Order 9066, which authorized the Secretary of War to set some military zones for the internment of Japanese Americans. California had some of the U.S. prisoner of war camps and Japanese Americans internment camps. War Relocation Authority built both temporary and permanent relocation camps. As aliens they had to register in accordance with the law and were required to turn in all weapons and short-wave radios. Japanese Americans first were sent to one of California's 11 temporary relocation camps, like the two in southern California: Pomona assembly center and the Santa Anita assembly center. From these centers many were sent to other states and some were sent to California's Manzanar War Relocation Center, California or the Tule Lake War Relocation Center. Even with internment, a number of American-born Japanese (or Nisei) volunteered to join the U.S. armed services. The Nisei units fought well and are highly decorated units. Nisei joined all the U.S. armed branches, most joined the U.S. Army.
- Camp Haan was built at near March Air Reserve Base, the camp housed 1,200 Italian prisoners of war (POW). German POWs were also housed at the camp. In all 21 POW camps were built in California. A number of Italian POWs pledged to help the United States. About 70% to 90% of the Italian POWs volunteered for Italian Service Units (ISU). Due to labor shortage the Italian Service Units helped on Army depots, arsenals, farms and hospitals, there they volunteered to work and received better housing, than the standard POW camps. Camp Lamont was used for German POW volunteers to work on crops. Camp Cooke held German POWs, now the site of Vandenberg Air Force Base. The Stockton Ordnance Depot held 1,500 German prisoners from May 1944 till June 1946.

=== Attacks on California ===
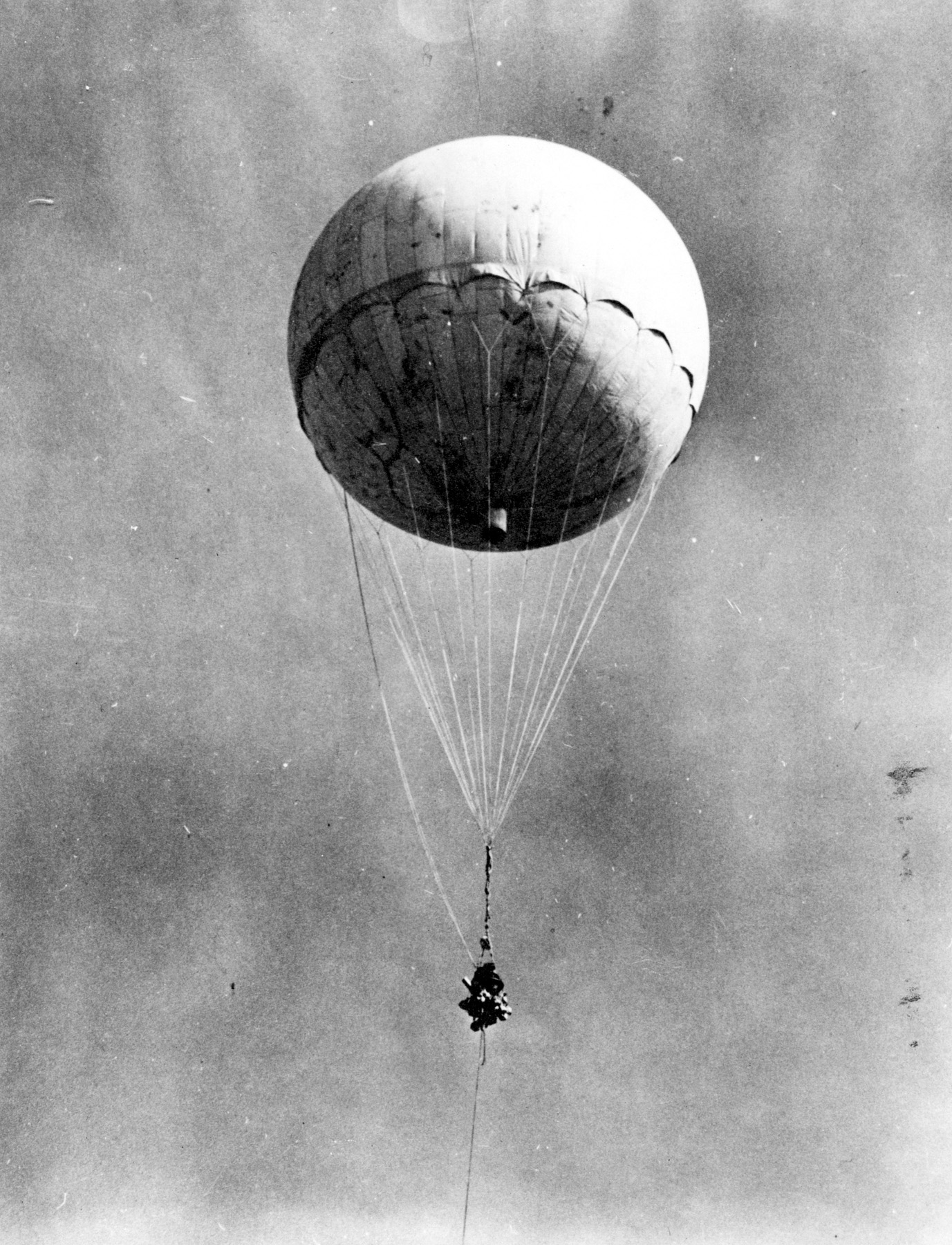
Shot-down fire balloon reinflated by the US at Moffett Airfield

- On February 23, 1942, the Japanese bombed the Ellwood Oil Field. The Ellwood Oil Field and oil refinery are located in Goleta, California in the Santa Barbara Channel. Japanese submarine I-17 fired 16 shells at the Oil Field from its deck gun before running. This attack along with the Niihau Incident started the fear of the invasion of California. There was speculation that the battle group that attacked Hawaii would come to California next. There were no casualties and little damage in the attack. News of the attack triggered an invasion scare along the West Coast of the United States.
- Fu-Go balloon bombs were the other attack on California and 14 other states. Japanese launched fire bomb balloons across the Pacific Ocean. These high-altitude balloons carried bombs and incendiary explosives. In California 25 fire bomb balloons were found, none caused injuries in California. The balloon bombs were launched in Japan from November 3, 1944, to April 1945. On February 23, 1945, a P-38 Lightning plane shot down a balloon near Santa Rosa, California. On January 10, 1945, an Army P-38 shot down a Fu-Go balloon near Alturas, California
- Ships off the California coast were attacked: SS Agwiworld (escaped), SS Emidio (sank), SS Samoa (escaped), SS Larry Doheny (sank), SS Dorothy Phillips (damaged), SS H.M. Storey (escaped, sank later), SS Camden (sank), SS Absaroka (damaged), SS Montebello (sank), SS Barbara Olson (escaped), SS Connecticut (damaged), SS Fort Camosun (Sank), and SS Idaho [tanker] (minor damage). In the attacks, eight seamen were killed and others injured. After the attack on Pearl Harbor the Imperial Japanese Navy sent five Submarines, I-17, I-19, I-23 I-25 and I-26, to attack ships off coastal California.
- Due to fear California coastal cities turned off lights or blacked out windows at night. Some radio stations went off the air and civil ships were ordered to stay in port. Commercial air travel was grounded. A military defense system was installed up and down the coast, that included blimps, patrol ships, artillery batteries, and aircraft.
- The sense of danger caused the "Battle of Los Angeles." On February 24 and 25, 1942 Los Angeles civil defense thought there was an attack and so 1,440 rounds of U.S. anti-aircraft ammunition was fired at what turned out to be a non-existent enemy. Reports of an unidentified aircraft started blackout and shooting of reported incoming aircraft. There was crazed and inaccurate reporting of the event at the time. The only damage in the city was self-inflicted from anti-aircraft fire coming down. The event exposed the defenselessness of the West Coast, as California was defended by only 16 modern warplanes at the time.
- After the war it was learned that Tokyo had planned a December 24, 1941 attack on San Diego Bay. Japanese submarine I-10 was to be the leader of seven other submarines that were to shell the U.S. Navy at San Diego Bay. The attack was called off with the subs only 20 miles off the California coast.

=== Ammunition ===
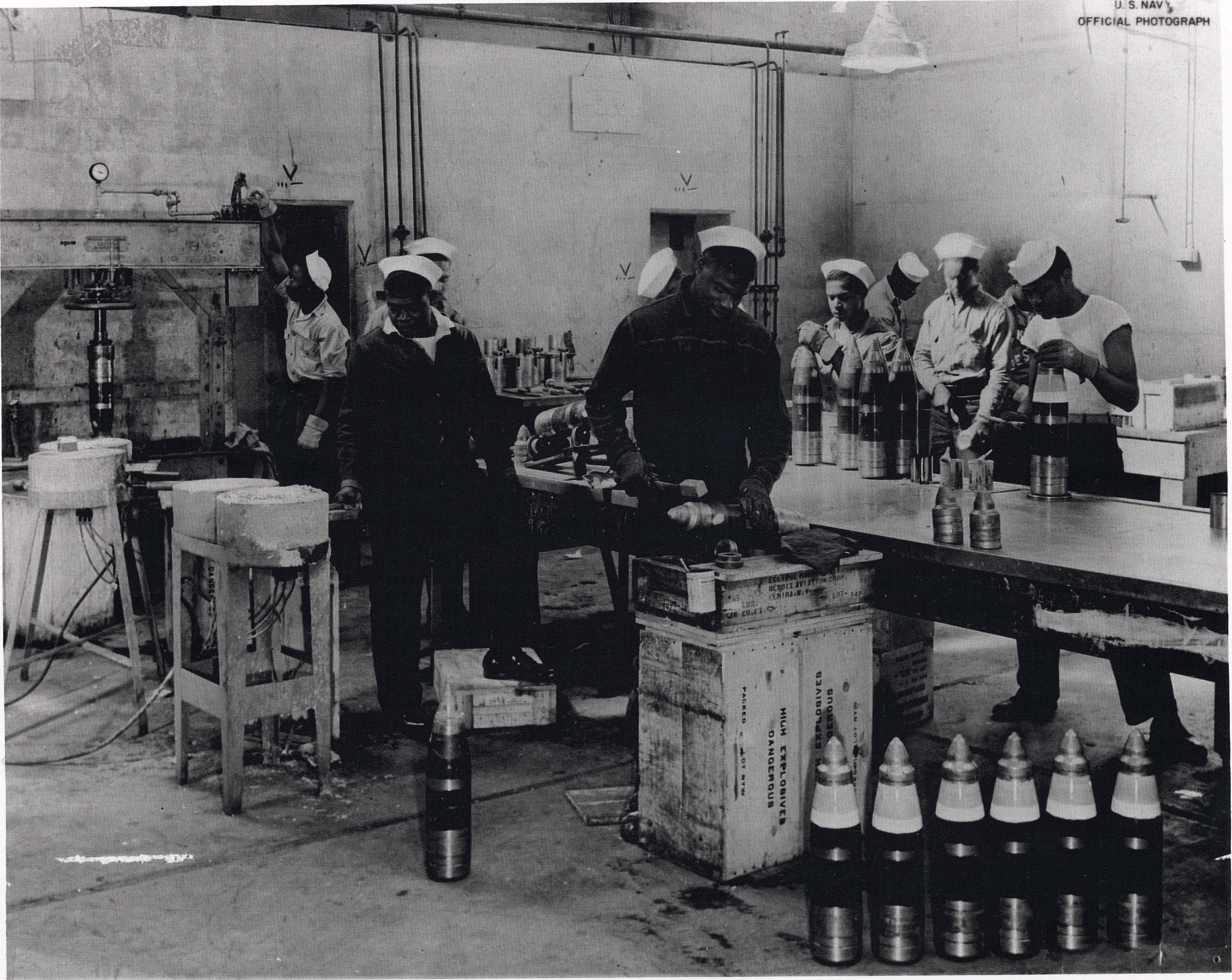
African American sailors of an ordnance battalion preparing 5-inch shells for packing at the Port Chicago Naval Magazine in 1943

California was a major supplier of ammunition for the war. Riverbank Army Ammunition Plant in Stanislaus County and Benicia Arsenal were two of the largest ammunition makers. In San Bernardino the Western Stove Company built incendiary bombs.

The largest World War II accident in California was the Port Chicago disaster. The Liberty ship SS E. A. Bryan exploded on July 17, 1944, while being loaded with ammunition. About 4,600 tons (4,173 tonnes) of explosives had been loaded in the ship's holds at the time. The explosion killed 320 sailors and civilians and injured 390 others.

=== Hollywood ===
Hollywood's motion-picture industry continued to make movies during the war. In addition to entertainment films, Hollywood made training films and films to raise morale. The 1942 film The Arm Behind the Army showed how important home support of the war was.

Bob Hope volunteered with the United Service Organizations (USO) and entertained troops during World War II and for decades later (1941 to 1991). Hope brought many Hollywood stars with him on his USO tours.

Desi Arnaz was stationed at Birmingham General Army Hospital in Van Nuys, California during the war to entertain the troops there. Arnaz had a bad knee and so was transferred to the US Army Medical Corps. Arnaz also coordinated with the stars that visited the hospital.

The Walt Disney Company famously dedicated a large portion of their business to making propaganda films.

=== War Bond sales ===
To help pay for the war, the U.S. sold war bonds. With its booming economy during World War II, Californians was one of the top of U.S. War Bonds sold. Much of the advertising for war bonds was donated. The spirit of sacrifice was never stronger for the defense of democracy and a way of honoring the sacrifices of American troops. Named after the 1942 Hollywood Victory Caravan, Paramount-produced film promoted bond sales in a 1945, post War. The short film included Bing Crosby, Bob Hope, Alan Ladd, William Demarest, Franlin Pangborn, Barbara Stanwyck, Humphrey Bogart, and others. Even athletes—like Joe Louis and Joe DiMaggio—sold war bonds. Albert Einstein donated the original copies of his manuscript on the theory of relativity for auction to raise money for war bonds.

=== California National Guard ===
California National Guard was mobilized and called to active duty in August 1940. The US Army recruited the first group to deploy to the war in Europe. The others troops called up were sent to the Pacific war. Between 1940 and 1941, about 12,000 California National Guard troops were called up to service in federal duty. California National Guard was used for coast patrols, security guards for the Army Air Force bases, railroad bridges, rail tunnels, and major dams. Major training bases are Camp Roberts and Camp San Luis Obispo.

=== Civil defense ===
Due to the attack on Pearl Harbor—and on California—civil defense systems began. The Office of Civilian Defense was founded on May 20, 1941, and the Office of Civil Defense in May 1941. The Civil Air Patrol was started on December 1, 1941, in which civilian planes and spotters were used in air reconnaissance, search-and-rescue, and transport. After the attacks on California, the Coast Guard Auxiliary became very active in the use of civilian boats and crews for reconnaissance and search-and-rescue. Towers were built along the coast, staffed with spotters to look for enemy aircraft working with the Ground Observer Corps. In February 1942 the Federal government started War Time, ending in September 1945. With War Time California time was renamed to Pacific War Time with special Daylight Savings times. In August of 1943, the Women Airforce Service Pilots (WASP) started, using 1,074 civilian women pilots to fly new warplanes from the factories to Army airfields. These pilots began training in preparation for deployment. WASP pilots also towed targets for live anti-aircraft artillery practice, towed gliders for practice landings, simulated strafing missions, and transported cargo. WASP California headquarters was at Santa Ana Army Air Base, Merced Army Airfield, Minter Field, and Victorville Army Airfield

=== Railroads ===
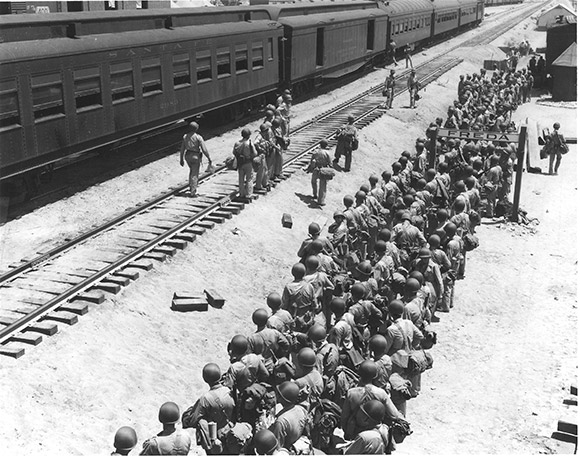
Soldiers arriving at Camp Freda railroad siding

American railroads moved 70% of all freight transported in the United States in 1940. During World War II the passenger and freight volume increased vastly. Railroads moved about 90% of the military's cargo need and transported 98% of military personnel. Railroads worked overtime to keep up with demand. It was patriotic to avoid all unnecessary travel, to give space needed for troop movement. Railroad brought troops to California training centers and camps. Railroad brought workers to California's growing defense industry. During World War II rail-line moved to Diesel locomotives and away from the labor-intensive steam locomotives. The Army had special hospital cars built to move wounded soldiers, one operated out of San Francisco.

=== Research ===
The development of new systems was a key to winning the war. World War 2 brought about many new technologies. Some California colleges and universities joined in the V-12 Navy College Training Program training volunteers for Navy commission. Some California universities also had classes for aeronautical engineering, resident inspectors of ordinance and naval material, and a liaison for the National Defense Research Committee.

- Los Alamos National Laboratory – Top secret Manhattan Project
- California Institute of Technology – aeronautical – wind tunnels – rocketry
- University of California, Berkeley – Manhattan Project
- Stanford University – radar microwave research
- University of California-San Diego – Frequency modulation Sonar to track multiple targets with a single ping and large Sonar crystals.
- University of California, Riverside – V-12 Navy College
- University of California, Los Angeles – V-12 Navy College – Scuba diving
- Occidental College – V-12 Navy College
- Early Penicillin experiments were done at the Kaiser Richmond Shipyards.
- Skunk Works – Planes and jets
- Hewlett-Packard built oscillators for proximity fuze and microwave Signal generator used in radar and counter-radar measures.
- Hedy Lamarr Hollywood actor with George Antheil invented Frequency-hopping spread spectrum for the Navy.

=== Veterans ===
After the war Operation Magic Carpet started to bring the troops home, some brought home war brides. On October 30, 1944, Governor Earl Warren started the California Veteran's Commission. The Commission worked to help veterans re-entry into civilian life. The Commission working with United States Department of Veterans Affairs, California Military Department, state agencies, local governments, and community groups like: American Legion, Veterans of Foreign Wars, and Disabled American Veterans. Many Veterans Health Administration facilities were opened in the state. Veteran's Bond Act of 1943 helped veterans to purchase a home or farm. Veterans started families, that is called the baby boom, birth rates increased in the U.S. and California.

== Manufacturing ==
=== Ship building ===
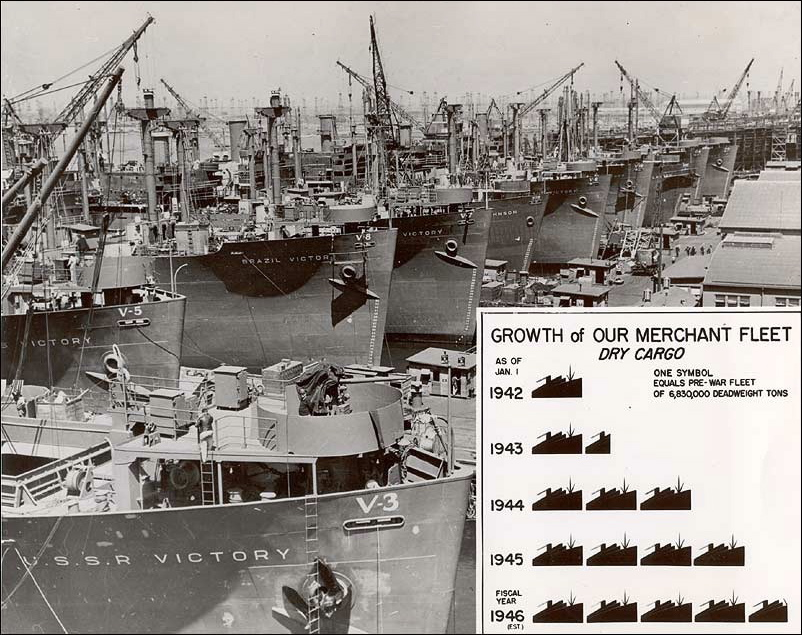
War Shipping Administration photo showing early 1944 Victory ship construction at California Shipbuilding Corporation with a May 1945 war tonnage production chart

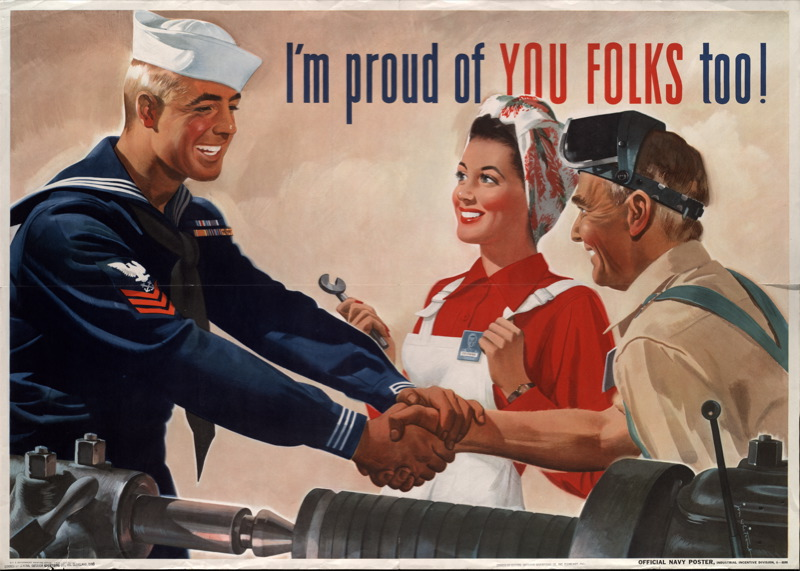
"I'm Proud of You Folks Too!", US Navy poster, 1944, by Jon Whitcomb

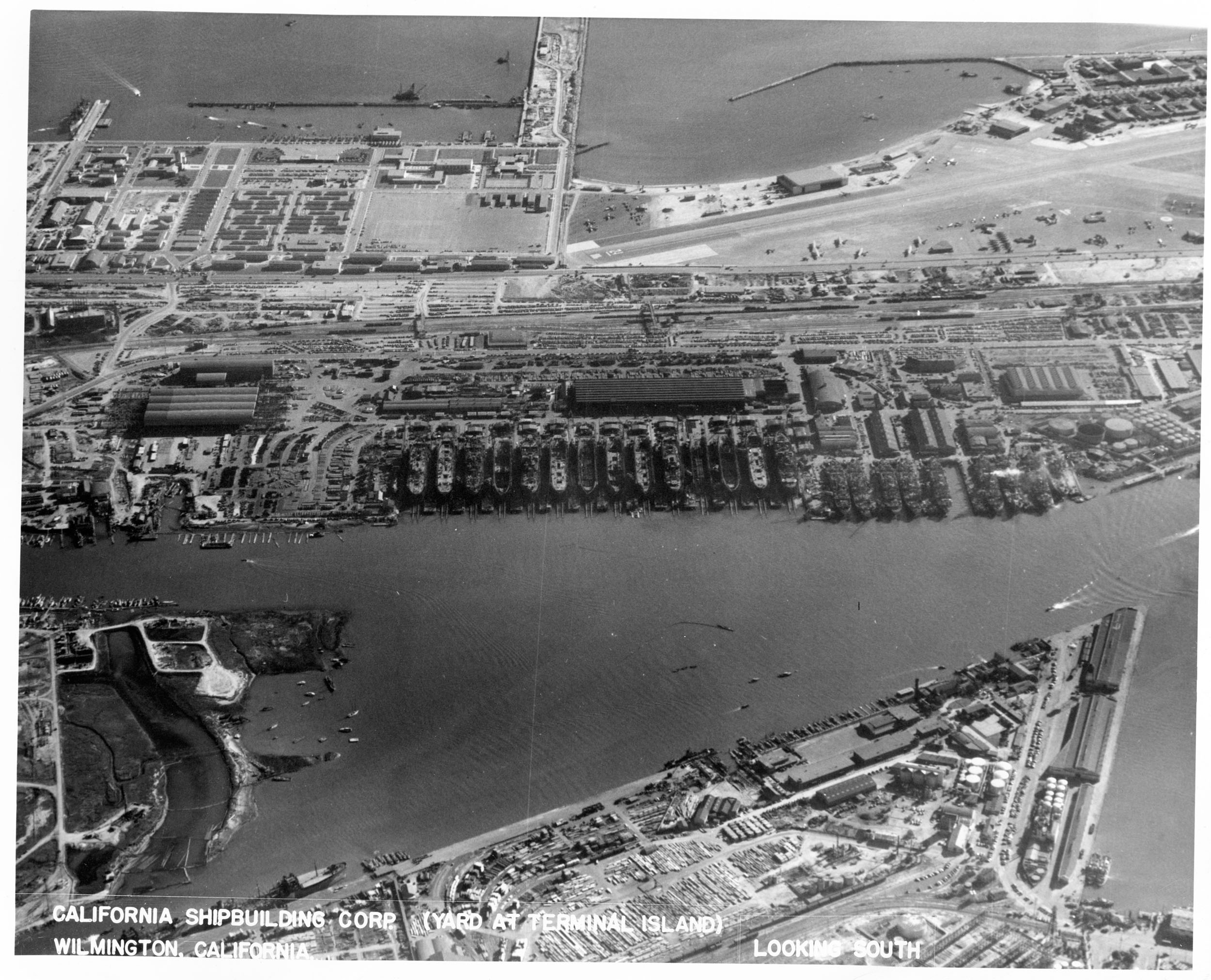
CalShip was the most productive of the Los Angeles shipyards

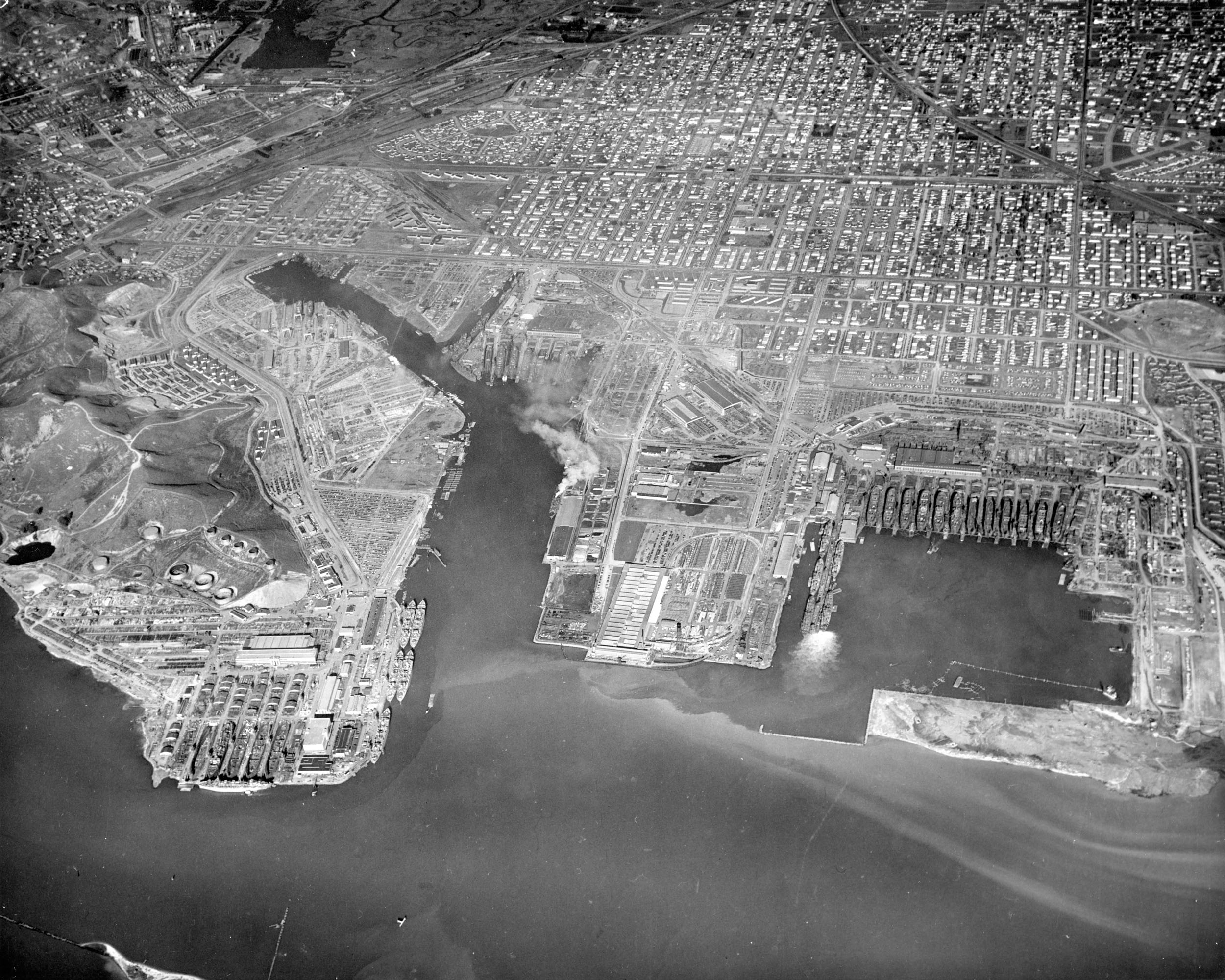
View of the four Richmond shipyards, fiery crucible of the San Francisco Bay area

California became a major builder of ships for the war. Under the Emergency Shipbuilding program, cargo ships like Liberty ships and Victory ships were built in days, not the normal months. Ships that could be repaired overseas greatly reduced repair time, so California shipyards also built floating dry docks like the Large Auxiliary Floating Dry Docks and Medium Auxiliary Floating Dry Docks. As fear of an attack on California seemed likely, the War Department requested some ships be built at an inland ports, so many new ships were built at the Port of Stockton, seventy nautical miles from the ocean. Henry J. Kaiser built day care centers at his shipyards in Richmond. Kaiser Steel was headquartered in Fontana, California. Some of the ships were given to the Allies of World War II through the Lend-Lease act of March 11, 1941. At the end of the war there was a surplus of ships and most shipyards were closed. Surplus ships were either sold or put into the Navy Reserve Fleet, like the Suisun Bay Reserve Fleet. California ship yards:

==== Los Angeles ====
Major

- California Shipbuilding on Terminal Island, a Bechtel shipyard
  - 306 Liberty cargo ships
  - 101 Victory cargo ships
  - 30 attack transports (Victory hulls)
  - 30 tankers (Liberty hulls)
- Consolidated Steel Corporation in Wilmington and Long Beach
  - 2 P1 attack transports
  - 10 C2
  - 78 C1-B and C1-S-AY1
  - 55 C1-M-AV1
  - 32 attack transports
  - 18 frigates
- Bethlehem Shipbuilding San Pedro on Terminal Island, 26 destroyers
- Todd Pacific Shipyards, Los Angeles Division San Pedro
  - 10 large auxiliaries
  - formerly Los Angeles Shipbuilding and Drydock Corporation, change of management during the war
- Western Pipe and Steel, 12 destroyer escorts, 11 cutters, 7 icebreakers, 32 LSM
  - not to be confused with Western's primary shipyard in South San Francisco

Minor

- Hodgson-Greene-Haldeman, Long Beach, Type V ship wood tugboats.
- Fellows & Stewart in Wilmington, Sub chaser and rescue boat
- Harbor Boatbuilding at Terminal Island, Minesweeper, Torpedo Boat, Sub Chaser, & rescue boat
- Wilmington Boat Works in Wilmington, Sub Chaser, Harbor Tug, Rescue boat
- Pacific Boat, Terminal Island, Wood BC Deck Barge
- Patten-Blinn Lumber, Los Angeles, Knockdown Wood BK Barge
- Long Beach Boat, Long Beach Army J Boat
- J. E. Haddock Company, San Pedro, AFDL42 Float dock
- Al Larson Boat Shop in San Pedro, Minesweeper and Sub Chaser
- American Pipe in Los Angeles, Barges
- Standard Steel in Los Angeles, Steel Barge BK
- Ashbridge Boatworks Los Angeles Army J Passenger Boat
- San Pedro Boatworks, San Pedro, Army J Patrol Boat
- Garbutt-Walsh Inc. in San Pedro, covered Barge
- Wilson Company in Wilmington, US Army Tug
- United Concrete Pipe Corporation in Long Beach ships
- Peyton Company in Newport Beach, Sub Chaser and Harbor Tug
- Ackerman Boat in Newport Beach, Sub Chaser and Harbor Tug

==== San Francisco ====
Major

- Bethlehem Shipbuilding Corporation
  - Union Iron Works
    - 4 cruisers, 36 destroyers, 12 destroyer escorts
    - 5 C1-B cargo in 1940/1941
  - Alameda Works Shipyard
    - 8 P2 transports
- Richmond Shipyards:
  - Kaiser Richmond No. 1 Yard; Oceans, Libertys, Victorys
  - Kaiser Richmond No. 2 Yard; Liberty, Victory
  - Kaiser Richmond No. 3 Yard; Type C4-class ship
  - Kaiser Richmond No. 4 Yard; Landing Ship, Tanks (LST)s, Tugs
- Mare Island Naval Shipyard in Vallejo, 31 destroyer escorts, 18 submarines
- Moore Dry Dock Company in Oakland, C2 Cargo
- Western Pipe and Steel Company in San Francisco, Cargo
- Marinship, in Sausalito, a Bechtel shipyard
  - 78 T2 tankers, 15 Liberty ships

Minor

- Oakland Estuary
  - United Engineering Company, 21 fleet tugs
  - General Engineering, 23 steel minesweepers and 4 steel net layers
  - Pacific Coast Engineering
  - Pacific Bridge Company
  - Cryer & Sons, Four Navy coastal cargo ships
  - W. F. Stone & Son, Minesweeper, Tug and Sub Chaser
  - Independent Iron Works, Barge
  - Poole & McGonigle, YFD-19
- Hunters Point Naval Shipyard (repairs only?)
- Kneass Boat Works in San Francisco Five Sub Chaser and a Tug
- Hunt Marine Service in Richmond, patrol boat, tug
- Soule Steel in San Francisco, Barge
- Judson Pacific, San Francisco, Steel BG Gasoline Barge
- Barrett & Hilp in San Francisco, concrete barge
- Anderson & Cristofani in San Francisco Patrol Craft (YP), APc
- California Steel Products in Richmond, Gasoline Barge
- Martinolich Shipbuilding Company, San Francisco, Self-Propelled Barge
- Madden, Lewis in Sausalito, Tug
- Sausalito Shipbuilding in Sausalito, Steel Barges

==== Other ====
- Pollock-Stockton Shipbuilding Company in Stockton, Net layer, Dry Dock
- Eureka Shipbuilding, Fields Landing tugboats
- Concrete Ship Constructors in National City Type B ship barges
- Barrett & Hilp, Concrete Ships in South San Francisco – barges
- Colberg Boat Works in Stockton, Minesweeper, Tug, Sub chaser
- Stephens Bros. Boat Builders in Stockton, Picket Boat, Tug, Rescue Boat
- Hickinbotham Brothers in Stockton (Guntert and Zimmerman ), Barge, Cargo, Tug
- Kyle and Company in Stockton, Coastal tanker
- Clyde W. Wood in Stockton, Tug, Cargo
- Nicholson, D. W. in Stockton, San Leandro and Oakland, Wood BC Deck barge
- Stockton Steel Fabrications Company in Stockton
- Basalt Rock Company in Napa, Rescue Ship, barge
- Campbell Industries in San Diego, four minesweepers
- Fulton Shipyard in Antioch, Minesweeper, Tug, and Troopship
- Chicago Bridge Eureka, Eureka, AFDM
- National Steel and Shipbuilding Company NASSCO in San Diego, US Army KD Barges
- Lynch Shipbuilding in San Diego, Rescue Tug and Coastal cargo
- San Diego Marine, San Diego, Minesweeper and Sub Chaser
- South Coast Shipbuilding in Newport Beach, Minesweeper, Sub Chaser and Crash boat
- Victory Shipbuilding in Newport Beach, Harbor Tug and Sub Chaser
- Moore Equipment Company in Stockton YSD
- Aetna Iron & Steel in San Diego YSR Barge
- Sacramento Shipbuilders in Sacramento, Barge
- Stanwood Shipyard in Stanwood, BCL Wood Barge
- Krem, Kau & Son, Pittsburg, Army J Passenger Boat
- Steinbrenner, Otto, Sacramento, Wood BC Deck Barge
- Olson Lumber, Alhambra, Knockdown Wood BK Barge
- National Iron Works, San Diego, Knockdown Steel BK Barge

=== Aircraft manufacturers ===
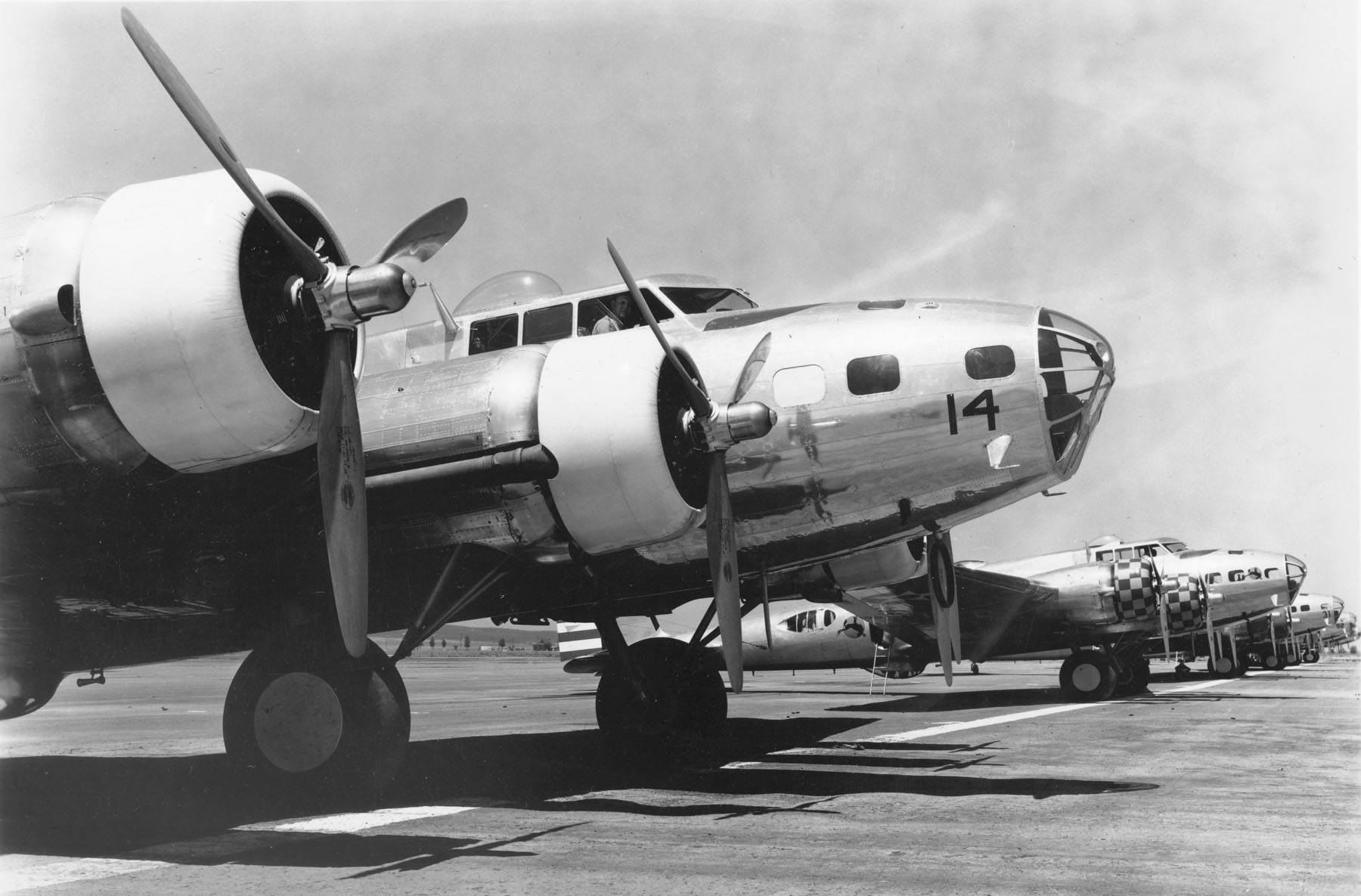
B-17Bs at March Field, California

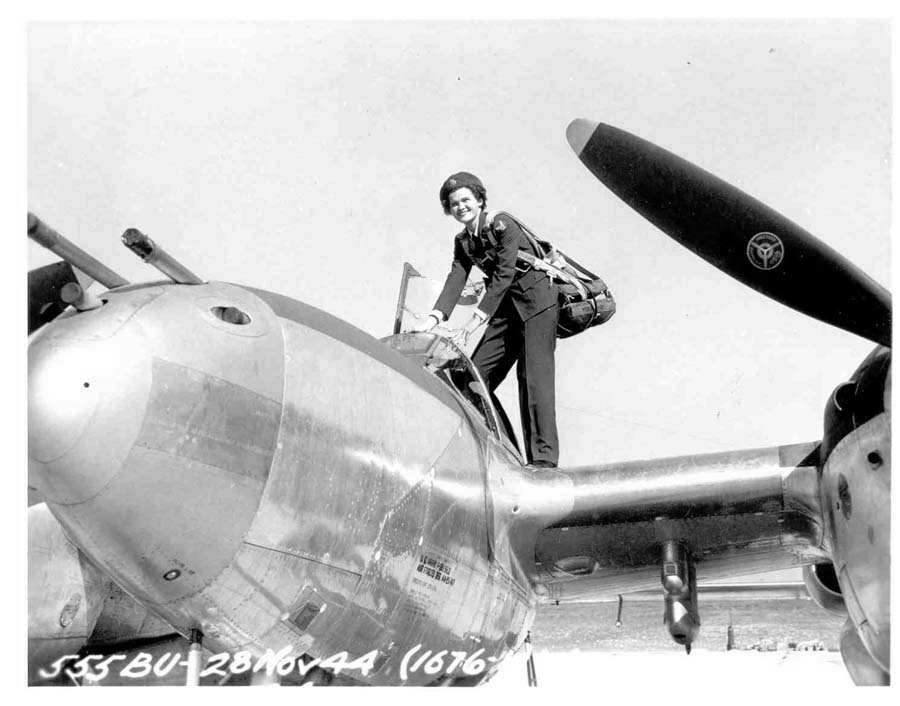
WASP pilot Ruth Dailey climbs into a Lockheed P-38 Lightning

Built in California during World War II were: B-17 Flying Fortress, Lockheed P-38 Lightning, Douglas C-47 Skytrain, Douglas SBD Dauntless, Douglas A-26 Invader, Lockheed Ventura, Lockheed Model 18 Lodestar, Lockheed P-2 Neptune, Lockheed Constellation, Douglas P-70 Nighthawk, Douglas DC-5, Douglas C-54 Skymaster, Douglas BTD Destroyer, Douglas A-33, Douglas TBD Devastator, Consolidated PB4Y-2 Privateer, Northrop A-17, Northrop BT, Northrop N-3PB, Northrop P-61 Black Widow, McDonnell FH Phantom, Consolidated B-24 Liberator, Consolidated PB2Y Coronado, Consolidated TBY Sea Wolf, Consolidated B-32 Dominator, Consolidated P-30, North American B-25 Mitchell, North American P-51 Mustang, Vultee A-31 Vengeance, Vultee BT-13 Valiant, Vultee P-66 Vanguard, Vultee V-11, Interstate Cadet, North American T-6 Texan, Douglas A-20 Havoc, Lockheed C-69 Constellation, Consolidated PBY Catalina, Interstate TDR, Timm N2T Tutor, Ryan PT-22 Recruit, Ryan ST and the Waco CG-4 / Timm CG-4A . The Lockheed Hudson built in Burbank was delivered to Canada and then the United Kingdom starting in 1939. By the end of the war California had 70% of the aerospace manufacturing in the United States and had built over 200,000 planes. Hughes H-4 Hercules, Victory Trainer and Bartlett Zephyr were built in California, but not used. The California Institute of Technology in Pasadena, California, started a School of Aeronautics and other aeronautic research labs in the early 1920s, this helped California become a major aerospace manufacturing center.

Aircraft manufacturers of World War II in California:

- Douglas Aircraft Company in Santa Monica, El Segundo, Long Beach, and Torrance
- Lockheed Corporation in Burbank
- Vega Aircraft Corporation in Burbank
- Northrop Corporation in Hawthorne
- Hughes Aircraft Company in Playa Vista and Culver City
- McDonnell Aircraft Corporation in Long Beach
- Consolidated Aircraft in San Diego (Convair after 1943)
- Ryan Aeronautical in San Diego
- North American Aviation in Inglewood
- Glenn L. Martin Company in Santa Ana, HQ and design only
- Harlow Aircraft Company in Alhambra
- Vultee Aircraft in Burbank and Downey (Convair after 1943)
- Interstate Aircraft in El Segundo
- O.W. Timm Aircraft Company in Van Nuys
- Bartlett Aircraft in Rosemead
- Hiller Aircraft in Berkeley
- Morrow Aircraft Corporation in San Bernardino
- Skunk Works design HQ in Burbank

=== Vehicles manufacturers ===
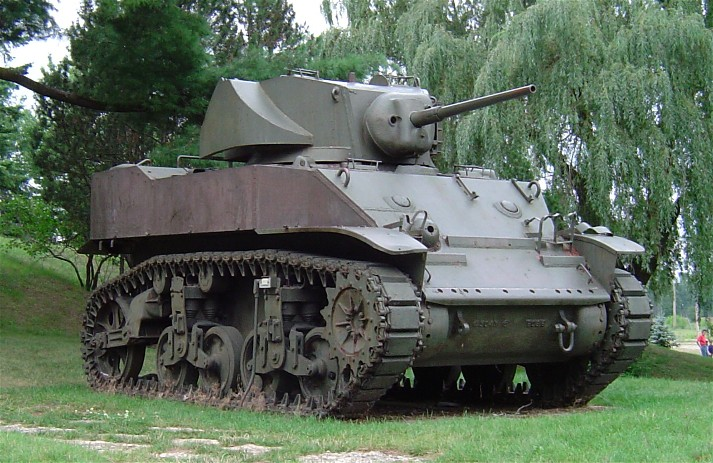
GM California M5A1 tank on display

During World War II all California civilian automobile manufacturing ended.

- General Motors South Gate Assembly built Stuart M-5 and M5A1 light tanks at 500 per month.
- General Motors Oakland Assembly built Pratt & Whitney aircraft engines and munitions.
- Ford Motor Company Assembly Plant in Richmond built 49,399 jeeps. The Ford plant also did completion work on tanks, armored personnel carriers, armored cars and other military vehicles. Ford's Long Beach plant was leased to the Air Force and used as an Air Base.
- Willys-Overland Maywood, California plant was used by Lockheed to build subassemblies for Lockheed Hudson.
- Chrysler of California, Los Angeles, built 12,214 aircraft engines, 4,100 B-17 cabins and 688 PV-2 Harpoon cabins.
- Studebaker Pacific Corporation of Los Angeles built engines for the B-17s and PV-2 Harpoons being built in Burbank.
- Menasco Motors Company in Burbank, built aircraft landing gear for North American, Lockheed, Republic, General Dynamics, and other aircraft manufacturers. Menasco continued this work after the war.
- Firestone Tire and Rubber Company of Los Angeles built 1,550 turrets used on M5 tanks. Firestone also built 3,100 M5 tank tracks.

=== Engine Manufacturers ===
Joshua Hendy Iron Works was the biggest supplier of reciprocating engines for Liberty ships in the country. It was also the only manufacturer of large steam turbine propulsion systems on the West Coast.

- Marine triple expansion reciprocating
  - Joshua Hendy Iron Works in Sunnyvale
- Marine diesel
  - Enterprise Engine and Foundry Co. in San Francisco
  - Atlas-Imperial in Oakland
- Marine steam turbines
  - Joshua Hendy in Sunnyvale

== Military installations ==
Like other states in the desert Southwest, many of the new military installations built were United States Army airbases. California's weather, wide open spaces, railroad connections, and access to ocean made it an ideal location for training pilots, also armored vehicles operators.

=== Desert Training Center ===
The largest United States Army training installation in the history of the United States was the Desert Training Center. To prepare troops for the battles in the North African campaign, the army had General Patton build many desert training camps in Southern California and a few in Arizona. The camps were built in the Mojave Desert and Sonoran Desert. The open space let the Army and Army Air Corps use live fire to train troops, test and develop equipment. Tactical doctrines, techniques, and training methods for combat were developed from this training. From 1 April 1942 to 1 July 1944, the complete training area covered 18,000 square miles. The camp reached from Pomona, California east to almost to Phoenix, Arizona and from Yuma, Arizona northward into the southern tip of Nevada.

California Army Divisional Camps

- Camp Clipper and Camp Essex
- Camp Coxcomb
- Camp Granite
- Camp Ibis
- Camp Iron Mountain
- Camp Pilot Knob
- Camp Young – Desert Training Center Headquarters

California Army Depots

- Camp Freda Quartermaster Depot
- Camp Desert Center
- Camp Goffs – Depot and Infantry training.
- Pomona Ordnance Depot

California Army Airfields

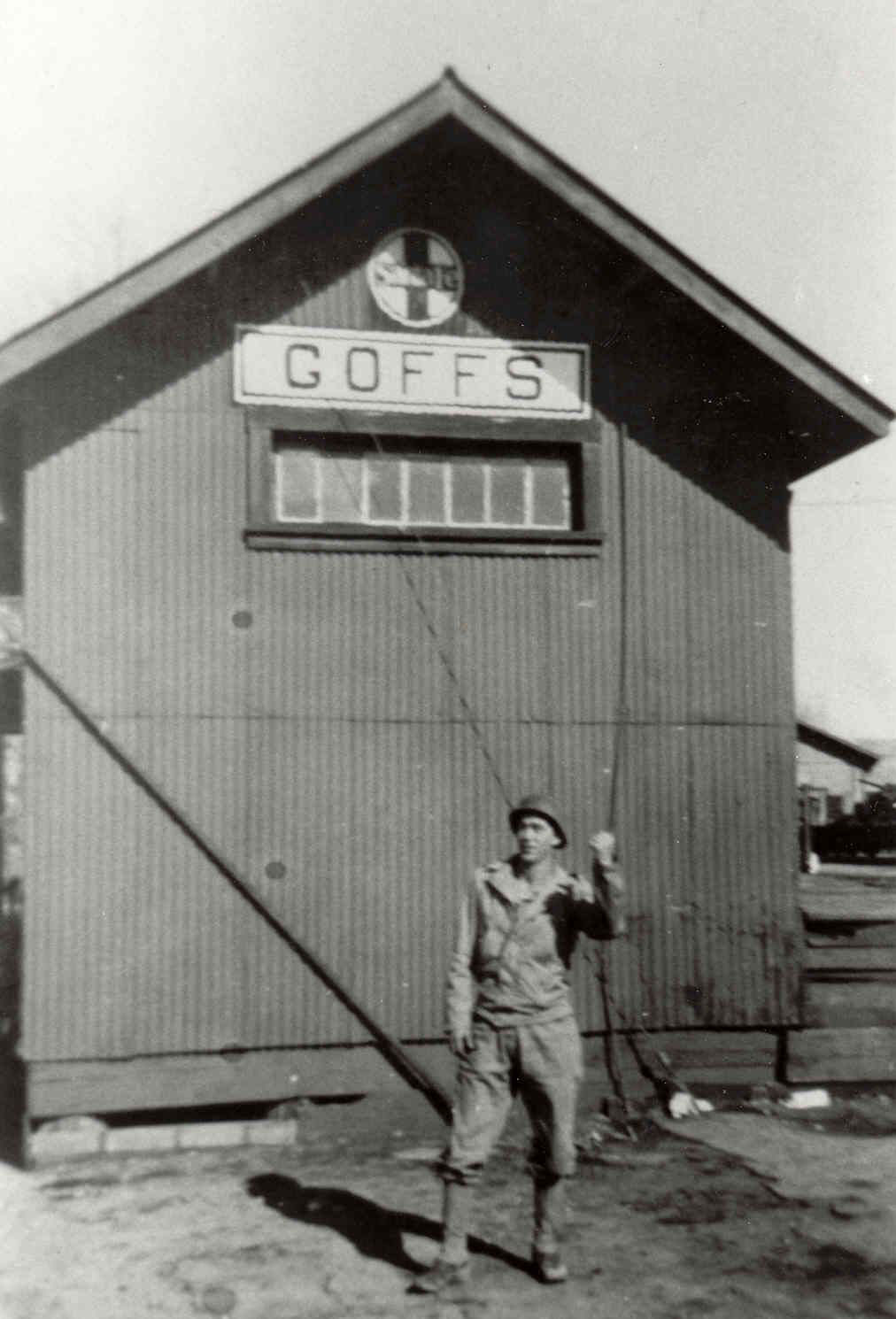
Camp Goffs Army Field Train station, 1943

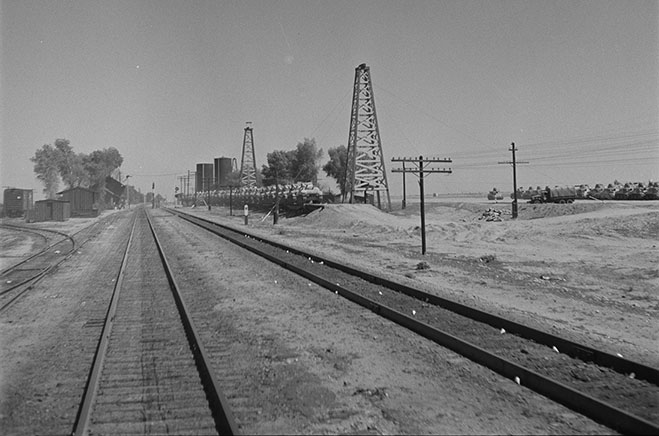
Camp Goffs Army Field, 1943

- Major airfields
  - Blythe Army Air Base
  - Desert Center Army Airfield
  - Thermal Army Airfield
  - Rice Army Airfield
  - Shavers Summit Army Airfield (now Chiriaco Summit Airport)
- Minor airfields
  - Camp Coxcomb Army Field (abandoned)
  - Camp Essex Army Field (abandoned)
  - Camp Goffs Army Field (abandoned)
  - Camp Ibis Army Field (abandoned)
  - Camp Iron Mountain Army Field

Desert Training Center California Hospitals

- Banning General Hospital (Banning, CA)
- Camp Freda Hospital
- Camp Desert Center Hospital
- Camp Goffs Hospital
- Torney General Hospital
- Needles Station Hospital
- Cherry Valley Hospital

=== US Army Bases ===
For World War 2 existing California Army bases were enlarged and many new bases were built. Bases were used for induction, training, deployment, supply depots, hospitals and housing of POWs.

- Fort Irwin
- Fort Ord
- Camp Funston
- Fort Hunter Liggett
- Parks Reserve Forces Training Area
- Presidio of Monterey
- Military Ocean Terminal Concord
- Camp Anza
- Camp Callan
- Camp Kearny
- Salinas Garrison
- Camp Lockett
- Fort Emory
- Oakland Army Base
- Fort Funston
- Fort MacArthur
- Camp Ashby
- Fort Mason
- Fort McDowell
- Fort Miley Military Reservation
- Camp McQuaide
- Camp Stoneman
- Fort Point
- Letterman Army Hospital
- Hoff General Hospital
- Fort Baker
- Fort Bragg
- Camp Tanforan
- Oakland Army Base
- Presidio of San Francisco
- Sacramento Army Depot
- San Carlos War Dog Training Center
- Camp Seeley El Centro
- Camp Pinedale
- Fresno Army Air Forces Training Center
- Santa Anita Ordnance Training Center
- Camp Roberts Army Base Monterey
- Camp San Luis Obispo, (Camp Merriam)
- San Joaquin Depot
  - Sharpe Facility
  - Tracy Facility
  - Lathrop Holding and Reconsignment
  - Lathrop Engineering Depot
- Stockton Ordnance Depot
- Sierra Army Depot in Herlong
- Birmingham General Hospital
- Mitchell Convalescent Hospital
- Camp Ross
- Benicia Arsenal
- Camp Ono for POWs
- Fort Barry
- Fort Cronkhite
- Fort Ord Station Veterinary Hospital
- DeWitt General Hospital
- Camp Kohler
- Camp Shoemaker
- Camp Flint
- Camp Tulelake
- Camp Tracy
- Radar Station B-71
- Battery Chamberlin
- Camp Lamont for POWs
- Milagra Ridge Military Reservation
- Camp Ayres – Chino Supply Depot – Camp Chino
- Pillar Point Military Reservation
- Santa Monica Army Air Forces Redistribution Center
- Hammond General Hospital

=== Air bases and airfield ===
Existing United States Army Air Corps air bases were enlarged to house and train the many new crews needed. Almost all civilian airports and airstrips were converted to Army Air training centers. Almost all civilian air flights were cancelled. Many new airstrips and landing pads were built for pilot landing and take-off training. Air bases had housing and meals for the troops. Some airstrips and landing pads had no support buildings, as they were used only for landing and take-off training. United States Army Air Corps World War II bases, airstrips and landing pads in California:

- Beale Air Force Base (Camp Beale), Marysville
- Muroc Army Airfield now Edwards Air Force Base
  - March Field, Riverside
- McClellan Air Force Base, Sacramento
- Fairfield-Suisun Air Force Base now Travis Air Force Base
- Camp Cooke now Vandenberg Air Force Base, Lompoc
- Los Alamitos Joint Forces Training Base
- Lemoore Army Air Field
- Long Beach Army Air Field
- Lomita Flight Strip
- Ontario Army Air Field
- San Bernardino Army Air Field
- Van Nuys Army Air Field
- Chino Airport
- Oxnard Air Force Base
- Clover Field
- Merced Army Air Field
- Camp Merced
- Grand Central Air Terminal
- Lockheed Air Terminal
- Mines Field
- Victorville Army Air Field
- Hamilton Army Airfield
- Bakersfield Army Air Field
- Mather Air Force Base
- Norton Air Force Base
- Naval Auxiliary Air Station Salton Sea
- McClellan Field
- McChesney Field
- Hammer Field
- Santa Monica Army Air Base
- Gardner Army Airfield
- Bicycle Lake Army Airfield
- Minter Field
- Santa Maria Army Air Field
- Lookout Mountain Air Force Station
- Chico Field
- Wendover Air Force Base`
- Santa Ana Army Air Base
- Palm Springs Air Base
- Fresno Air Base
- Chiriaco Summit Airport
- Bishop Army Airfield
- Blythe Army Airfield
- Palmdale Army Airfield
- Gary Army Airfield
- Oakland Municipal Airport
- Chico Army Air Field
- Reno Army Air Base
- Barstow-Daggett Airport
- Mira Loma Quartermaster Depot
- Montague Air Force Auxiliary Field
- Napa Army Airfield
- Willows Municipal Airport
- Redding Army Airfield
- Siskiyou County Army Airfield
- Salinas Army Air Base
- Delano Army Airfield
- Capitola Airport
- Meadows Field
- Visalia Army Airfield
- Hayward Army Airfield
- Orland Auxiliary Field
- Kirkwood Auxiliary Field
- Vina Auxiliary Field
- Campbell Auxiliary Field
- Oroville Auxiliary Field
- Sacramento Municipal Airport
- Oroville Army Airfield
- Siskiyou County Army Airfield
- Redding Army Airfield
- Boston Field
- Huron Field
- Indian Field
- Murray Field
- West Field
- Helm Field
- Corcoran Municipal Airport
- Porterville Army Airfield
- Coalinga Municipal Airport (Old)
- Buffalo Springs Airport
- Needles Army Airfield
- Shavers Summit Army Airfield
- Rice Army Airfield
- Half Moon Bay Flight Strip
- Estrella Army Airfield
- Santa Rosa Army Airfield
- Thermal Army Airfield
- Corcoran Airport
- Douthitt Strip
- Dos Palos Airport
- Trauger Auxiliary Field
- Hunter Auxiliary Field
- Caliente Flight Strip
- Franklin Auxiliary Airfield
- Hawthorne Municipal Airport
- Hayward Executive Airport
- Hemet-Ryan Airport
- Independence Airport
- Inyo County Airport
- Lancaster Airport
- Adamson Landing Field
- Mefford Field Airport
- Palo Alto Airport
- Gibbs Auxiliary Field
- New Jerusalem Auxiliary Airfield
- Porterville Army Airfield
- Rankin Field
- Redding Army Air Field
- Lindbergh Field
- San Francisco Airport
- Sequoia Field
- Stockton Army Airfield
- Sherman Army Airfield
- Kingsbury Auxiliary Airfield
- Tracy Auxiliary Airfield
- Modesto Auxiliary Airfield
- Twenty Nine Palms Army Airfield
- Visalia Army Air Field
- War Eagle Field
- Willows-Glenn Airport
- Winters-Davis Flight Strip
- Marysville Army Airfield
- Parker Auxiliary Airfield
- Kern Field Auxiliary Airfield
- Allen Auxiliary Airfield
- Conners Auxiliary Airfield
- Taft Auxiliary Airfield
- Cuyama Auxiliary Airfield
- Wasco Auxiliary Airfield
- Pond Auxiliary Field
- Famoso Auxiliary Airfield
- Dunlap Auxiliary Airfield
- Semi-tropic Auxiliary Airfield
- Poso Auxiliary Airfield
- Lost Hills Auxiliary Airfield,
- Hawes Auxiliary Airfield
- Helendale Auxiliary Airfield
- Howard Auxiliary Field
- Athlone Auxiliary Field
- Potter Auxiliary Field
- Liberty Auxiliary Field
- Victory Field Auxiliary Field
- Grand Central Air Terminal
- Montgomery Field
- Condor Field
- Fort Ord Army Airfield
- Fritzsche AAF
- Panamint Spring Auxiliary Airfield
- Peik Auxiliary Field

=== US Naval Bases ===
United States Navy's main marine bases were located in the deepwater ports of: San Diego Bay, Port of Los Angeles, San Francisco Bay and the Stockton Deepwater Shipping Channel. The US Navy during WW2 Pacific Fleet operated: ports, supply depots and airfields for aircraft carrier training, also blimps used for patrol of the coast. Post World War II many shipyards became home of the Pacific Reserve Fleet used to store the many surplus ships.
United States Navy World War II bases and stations in California:

- Mare Island Naval Shipyard, Vallejo, California, with Mare Island Naval Hospital
- Naval Base San Diego, San Diego
- Hunters Point Naval Shipyard
- Naval Air Weapons Station China Lake, China Lake Armitage Field
- Naval Base Ventura County, Point Mugu
- San Francisco Bay Naval Shipyard
- Hunters Point Naval Shipyard
- Naval Postgraduate School, Monterey
- Naval Air Station Alameda
- Naval Weapons Station Seal Beach, Seal Beach
- Naval Air Station Point Mugu, Point Mugu
- Naval Construction Battalion Center Port Hueneme
- Parks Reserve Forces Training Area
- Naval Hospital Santa Margarita Ranch
- Naval Reserve Center Santa Barbara
- Naval Medical Center San Diego
- Naval Medical Research Unit One
- Naval Air Station North Island, San Diego
- Fort Rosecrans, now Naval Base Point Loma
- Naval Air Base San Pedro
- Inyokern Auxiliary Field
- Naval Base Coronado
- Naval Construction Battalion Center Port Hueneme
- Naval Auxiliary Landing Field San Clemente Island
- Naval Auxiliary Air Station Monterey
- Long Beach Naval Shipyard
- Crescent City Outlying Field
- Army and Navy Academy
- Terminal Island San Pedro
- Point Arguello Radio Station
- Naval Auxiliary Air Station Twentynine Palms
- Naval Outlying Landing Field Imperial Beach
- Naval and Marine Corps Reserve Center in Los Angeles
- Naval Air Station, Santa Ana
- Moffett Federal Airfield – Naval Air Station
- Naval Training Center San Diego
- Rockwell Field
- Camp Hydle
- Half Moon Bay Flight Strip
- Naval Station Treasure Island
- Naval Auxiliary Air Station Ream Field
- Morris Reservoir Naval Weapons Test Site
- Naval Outlying Landing Field San Nicolas Island
- Rough and Ready Island Naval Supply Depot in Stockton
- Naval Amphibious Base Coronado
- McCornack General Hospital
- Naval Information Warfare Center Pacific
- Watsonville Airport
- Silver Strand Training Complex
- Camp Morena
- Naval Outlying Field, Ocotillo Dry Lake
- Naval Postgraduate School
- Naval Auxiliary Air Station Vernalis
- Naval Auxiliary Air Station, San Luis Obispo
- Chocolate Mountain Aerial Gunnery Range
- Carrizo Impact Area
- Navy Broadway Complex
- Naval Air Auxiliary Station Watsonville
- Naval Auxiliary Landing Field Santa Rosa
- Naval Advance Base Personnel Depot, San Bruno
- Auxiliary Air Station Monterey
- Naval Landing Force Equipment Depot in Albany, California
- Arcata, Naval Auxiliary Air Station
- Camp Kearny
- NASA Crows Landing Airport
- Naval Hospital Corona
- NAAS Brown Field
- King City Naval Auxiliary Air Station
- Amphibious Training Base, Castroville
- U.S. Naval Air Facility Del Mar
- Del Monte Navy Pre-Flight School
- Dixon Naval Radio Transmitter Facility
- Naval Auxiliary Air Facility Lompoc
- Naval Auxiliary Air Station Hollister
- Holtville Naval Auxiliary Air Station
- Sand Hill Naval Auxiliary Landing Field
- Naval Air Station Livermore
- Naval Station Newport
- Moffett Field airship hangars
- Naval Air Transport Service
- Concord Naval Weapons Station
- Point Molate Naval Fuel Depot
- Naval Auxiliary Air Station Miramar
- V-12 Navy College in Loma Linda, Redlands, UC and Occidental College
- Long Beach Army Airfield
- Skaggs Island Naval Communication Station
- Naval Auxiliary Air Station Salton Sea
- Fleet and Industrial Supply Center, Oakland
- Naval Hospital Oakland
- United States Navy Net Depot Tiburon
- Naval Auxiliary Air Facility Mills Field
- Naval Convalescent Hospital, Santa Cruz
- Amphibious Training Base Morro Bay
- Navy Building 101 in San Francisco
- Yosemite Naval Convalescent Hospital at the Ahwahnee Hotel
- San Leandro Naval Hospital
- Treasure Island Naval Auxiliary Air Facility
- Field Clark's Dry Lake
- Borrego Hotel Naval Outlying Landing Field
- Borrego Hotel Target Area
- Benson Bombing Range
- North Coyote Wells Naval Outlying Landing Field
- South Coyote Wells Naval Outlying Landing Field
- Jacumba Airport
- Rosedale Naval Outlying Landing Field
- Border Naval Outlying Landing Field
- Ramona Landing Field
- Eureka Auxiliary Field
- Arcata Naval Auxiliary Air Station
- Naval Industrial Reserve Repair Facility, Oakland
- Naval Reserve Armory, Oakland
- Naval Hospital Long Beach
- Alameda Naval Hospital
- Naval Convalescent Hospital Beaumont
- Naval Convalescent Hospital Arrowhead Springs
- Abel Field Outlying Field
- Brown-Fabian Airport Outlying Field
- Cope Field Outlying Field
- Gelderman Airport Outlying Field
- Heath NOLF
- Linderman Airport Outlying Field
- Livermore Airport Outlying Field
- May's School Field Outlying Field
- Rita Butterworth Airport Outlying Field
- Spring Valley Airport Outlying Field
- Wagoner Airport Outlying Field
- Camp Parks
- Camp Shoemaker
- U.S. Naval Hospital Shoemaker
- Naval Outlying Landing Field Cotati
- Naval Outlying Landing Field Anaheim
- Naval Outlying Field Palisades
- Mile Square Farm Naval Outlying Field
- Haster Farm Naval Outlying Landing Field
- Horse Farm Naval Outlying Landing Field
- Seal Beach Naval Outlying Landing Field
- Otay-Mesa Naval Auxiliary Air Station
- Sweetwater Dam Naval Outlying Landing Field
- San Clemente Naval Auxiliary Air Station

=== US Marine Corps ===
Camp Pendleton became the main training grounds for training Marines including landing craft school, amphibious tractor school, beach battalion school, amphibious communications school, and a medical field service school. Skills that would be used across the island hopping in the Pacific War and the war in Europe.

- Camp Pendleton San Diego
- Marine Corps Air Station Miramar San Diego
- Marine Corps Logistics Base Barstow Barstow, Yermo Quartermaster Sub-Depot
- Marine Corps Recruit Depot San Diego San Diego
- Marine Corps Air Station Camp Pendleton
- El Toro Marine Corps Air Station
- Tustin Marine Corps Air Station
- Marine Corps Air Station Santa Barbara
- Chocolate Mountain Aerial Gunnery Range
- Camp Elliott
- Camp Matthews
- Gillespie Field
- Camp Las Pulgas Bivouac Area
- Camp Ensign
- Ensign Ranch Airfield
- Camp Dunlap

=== US Coast Guard ===
In times of war, like during World War II, the United States Coast Guard operated as a branch of the Department of the Navy. In California the Coast Guard operated out of the 12th Naval District. Coast Guard's World War 2 Navy support included use of Coast Guard cutters, patrol boats, bases, stations and lighthouses. Patrols and search and rescue missions being the main task.

United States Coast Guard World War II bases in California:

- Coast Guard Island Alameda
- Coast Guard Air Station San Diego
- Coast Guard Air Station San Francisco
- Coast Guard Station Golden Gate
- Hamilton Cove Seaplane Base

=== United States Merchant Marine ===
The United States Merchant Marine operated merchant ships out of California US Navy and private ports to supply goods needed around the world. Most merchant ships operated with civilian merchants and US Navy armed guards to man the deck guns under the Merchant Marine Act of 1936. Merchant Marine operated many different types of ships, the most numerous type was the Liberty ships and Victory ships. Merchant Marine training was conducted by the Coast Guard. The Maritime Service established several Merchant Marine training centers in California for World War 2:

- Port Hueneme, California (1941–1942)
- Avalon, California (1942–1945)
- Government Island, California (1938–1943) (officers training also)

== Gallery ==
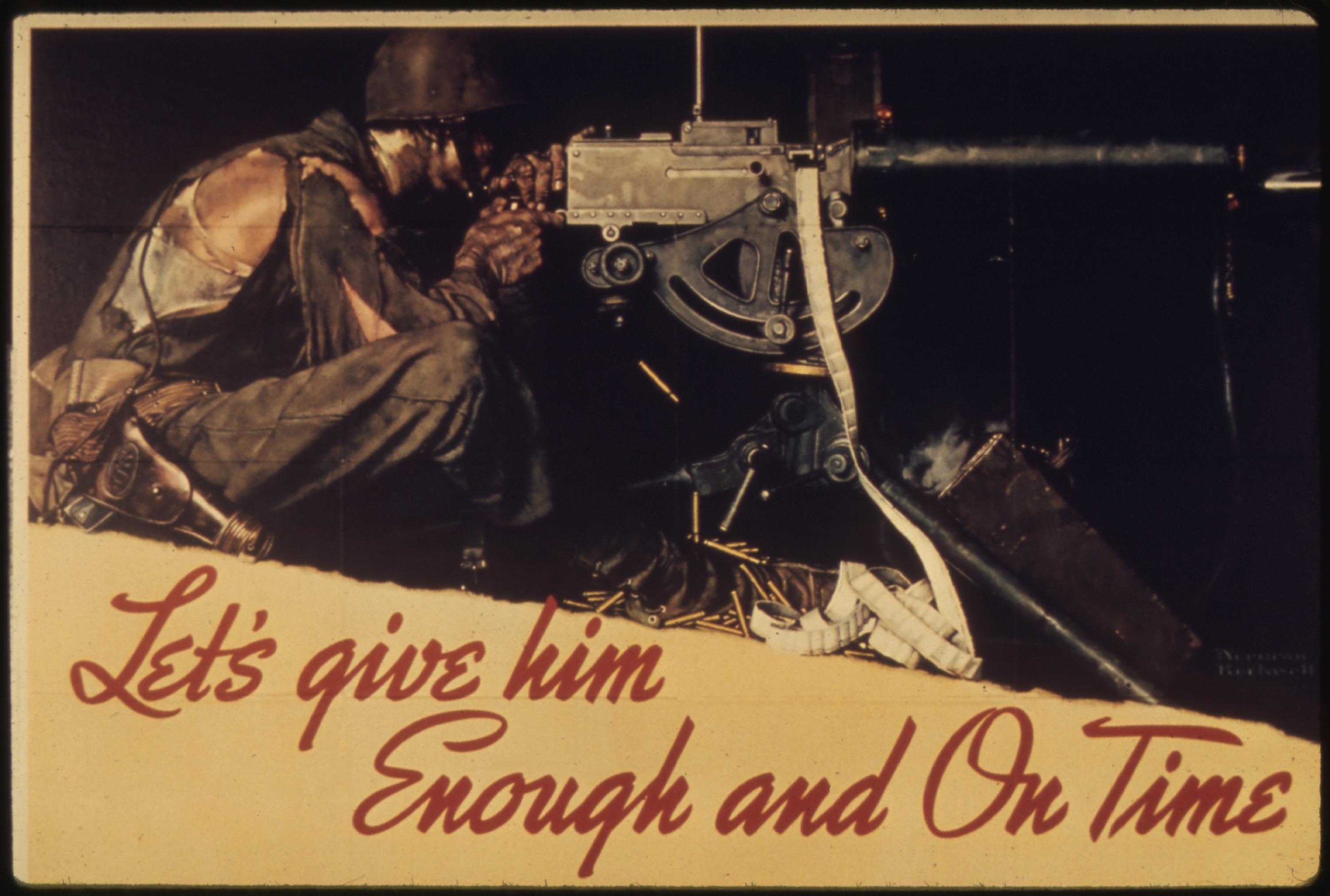
Norman Rockwell's Let's Give Him Enough and On Time

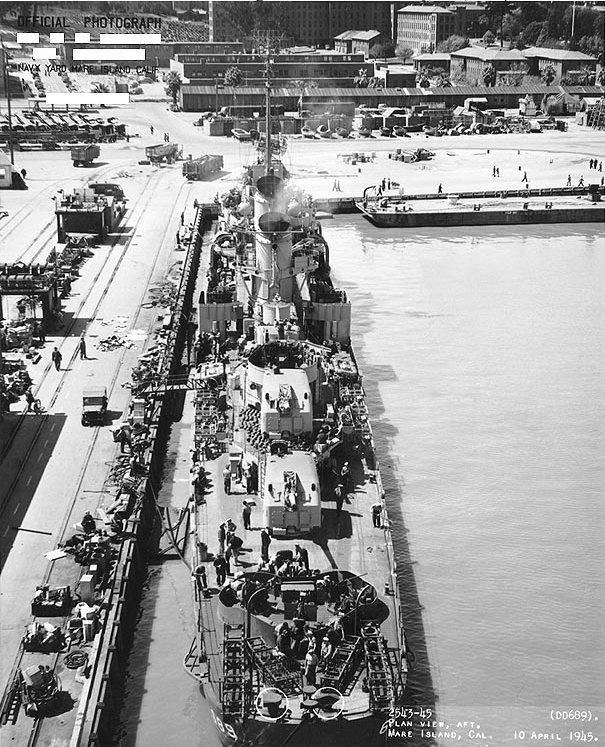
USS Wadleigh at Mare Island Naval Shipyard, 10 April 1945.

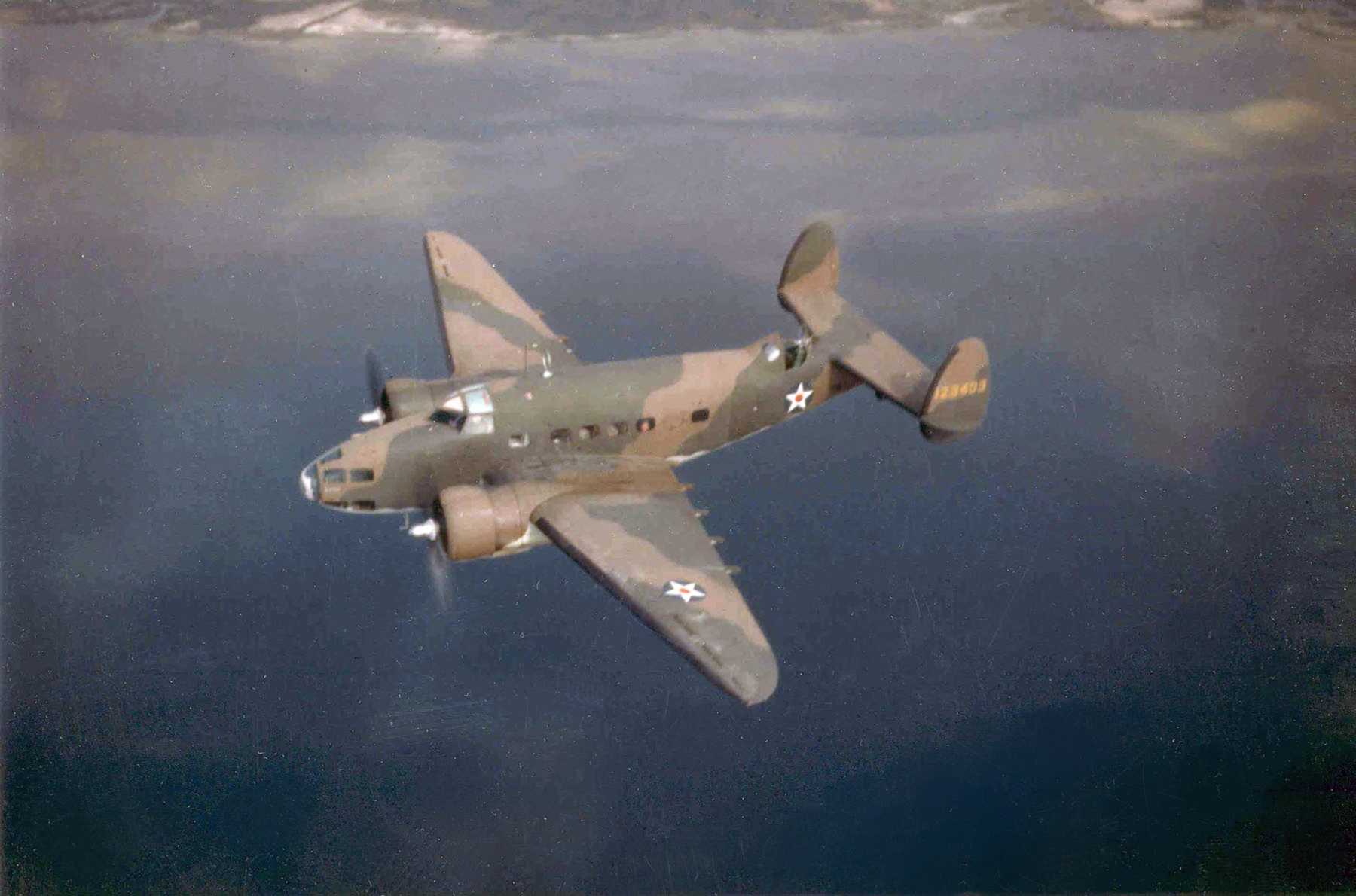
Lockheed Hudson in flight in 1941

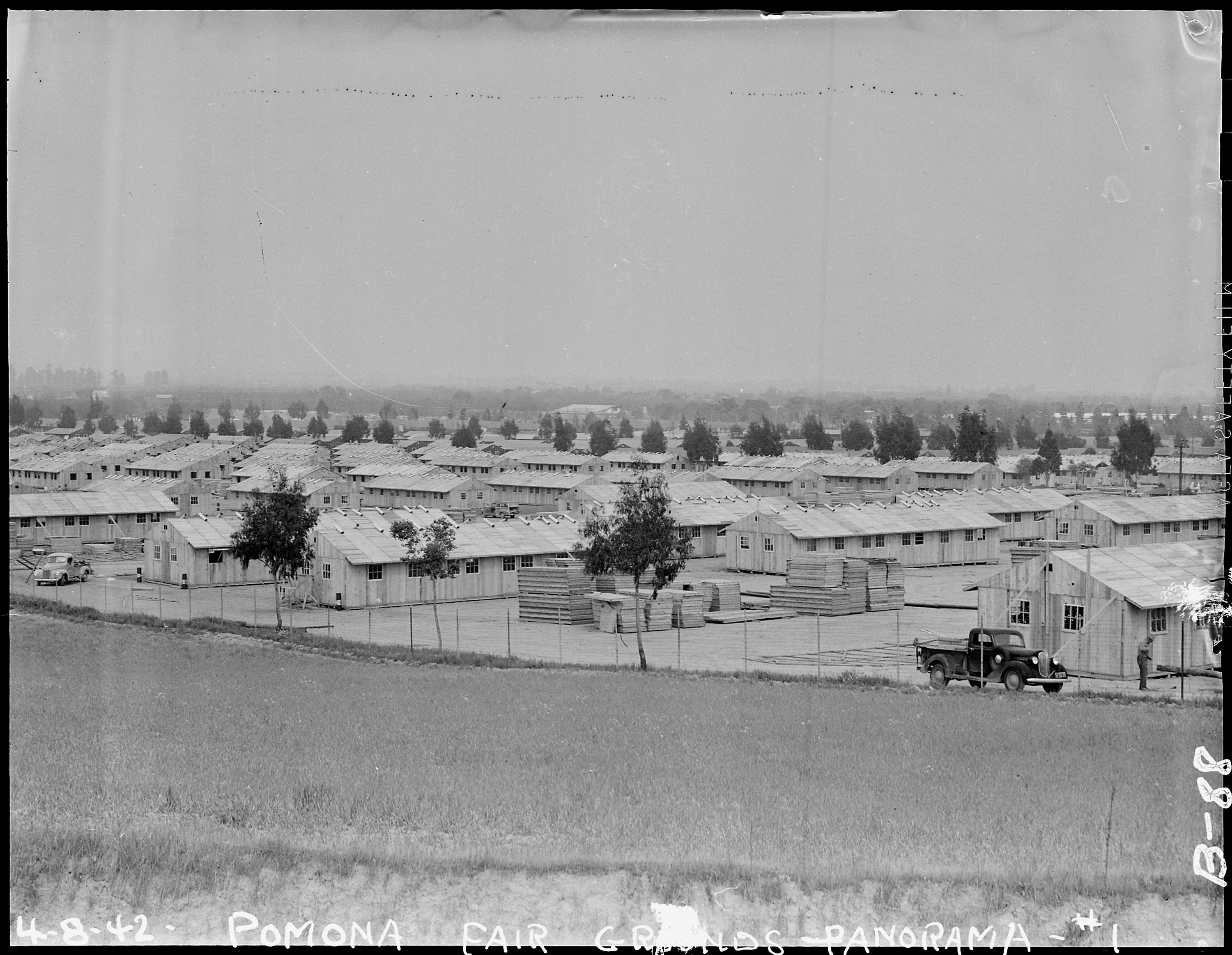
Pomona assembly center, temporary Detention Camp for Japanese Americans

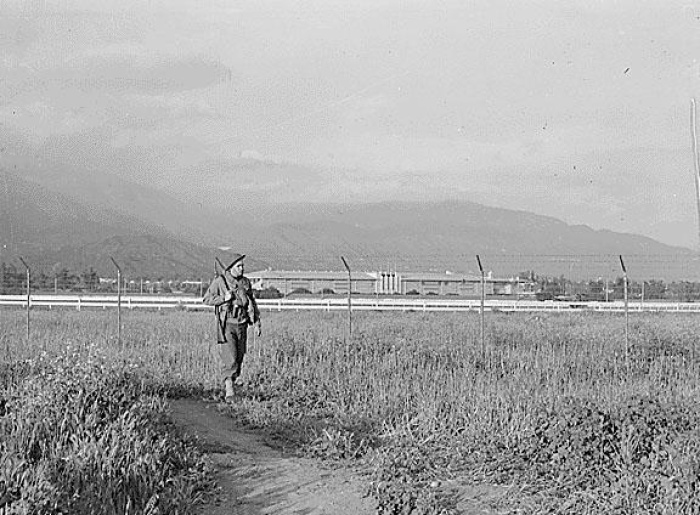
Santa Anita assembly center 1942 with Military police, temporary detention Camp for Japanese Americans

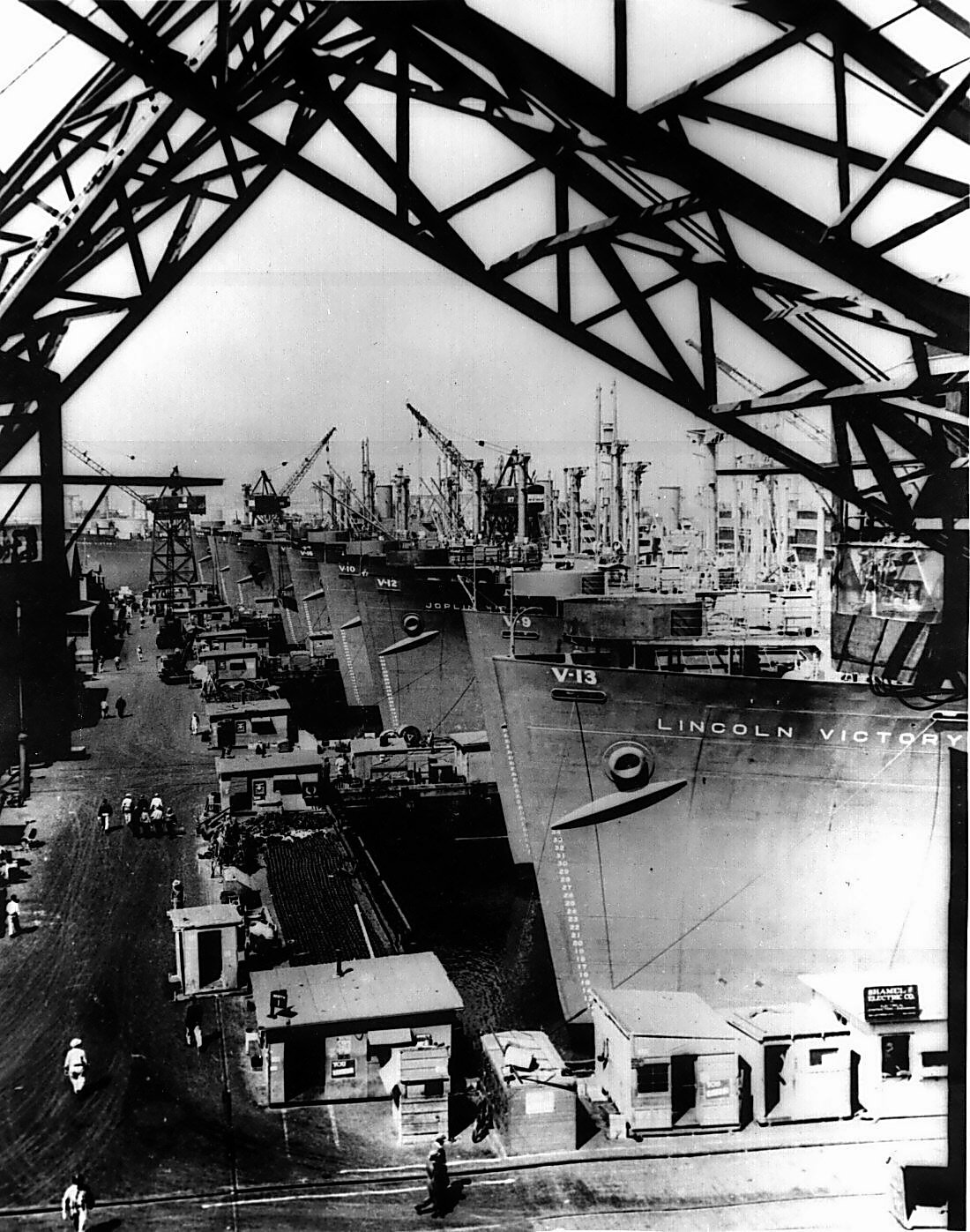
Victory cargo ships are lined up at California Shipbuilding Corporation in Los Angeles, California.

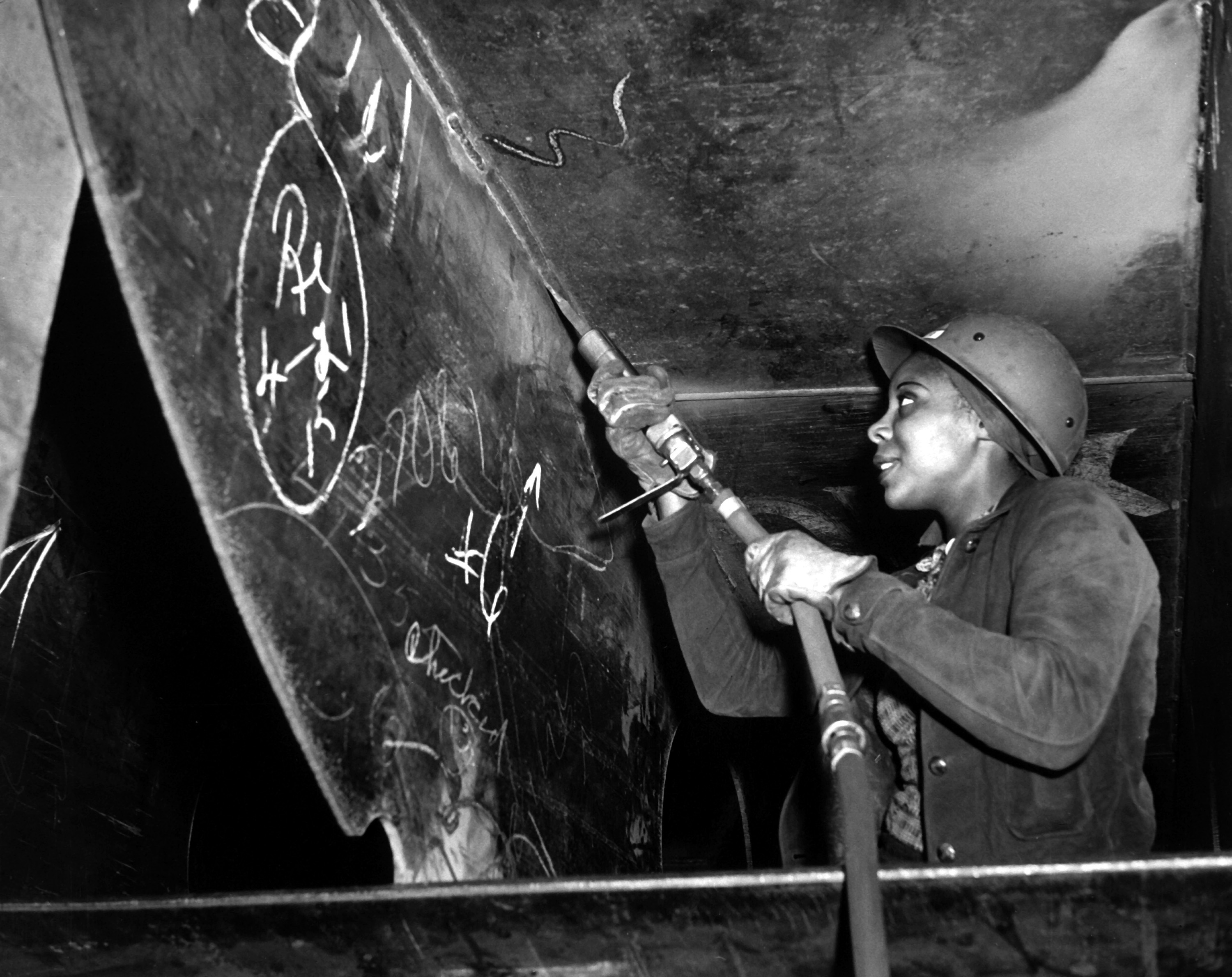
Eastine Cowner, a former waitress, at work on the Liberty ship SS George Washington Carver at the Kaiser shipyards, Richmond, California, in 1943.

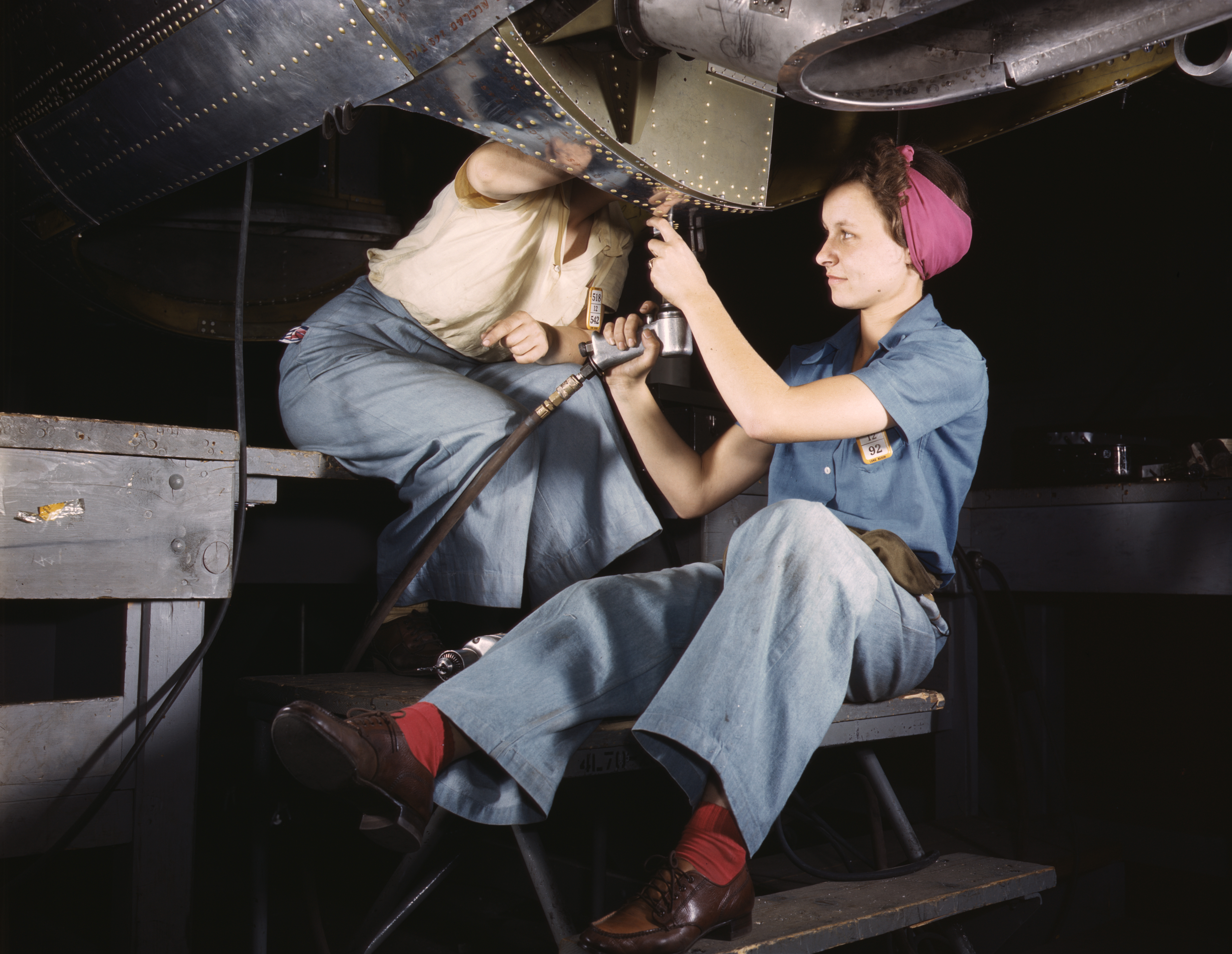
Women at work on bomber, Douglas Aircraft Company, Long Beach, California in October 1942

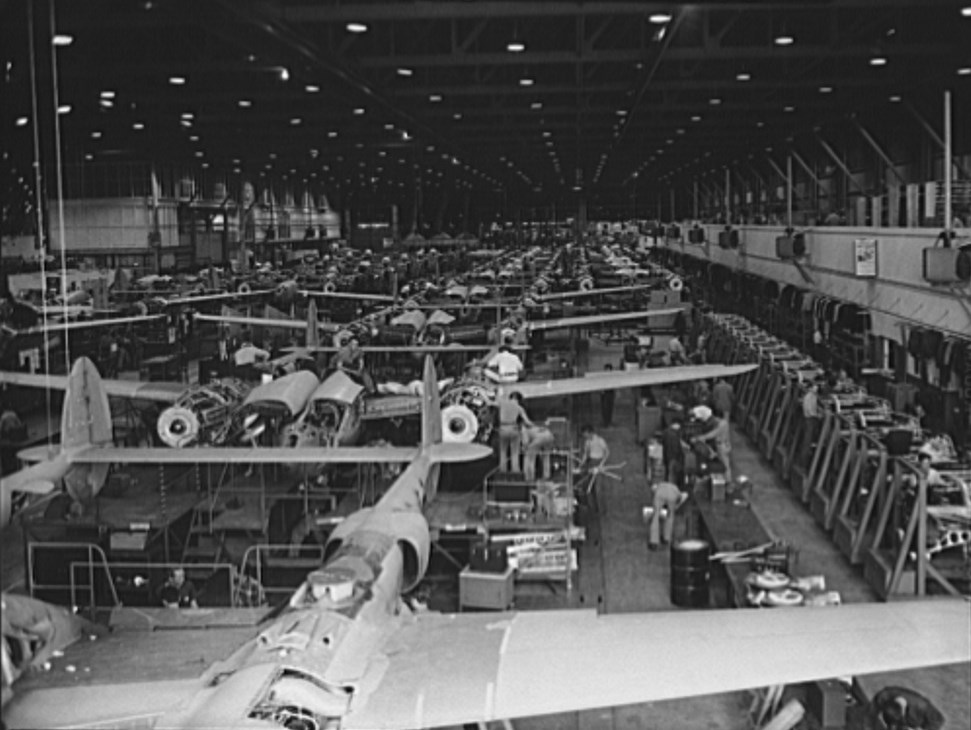
P-38 Lightning assembly line at the Lockheed plant, Burbank, California.

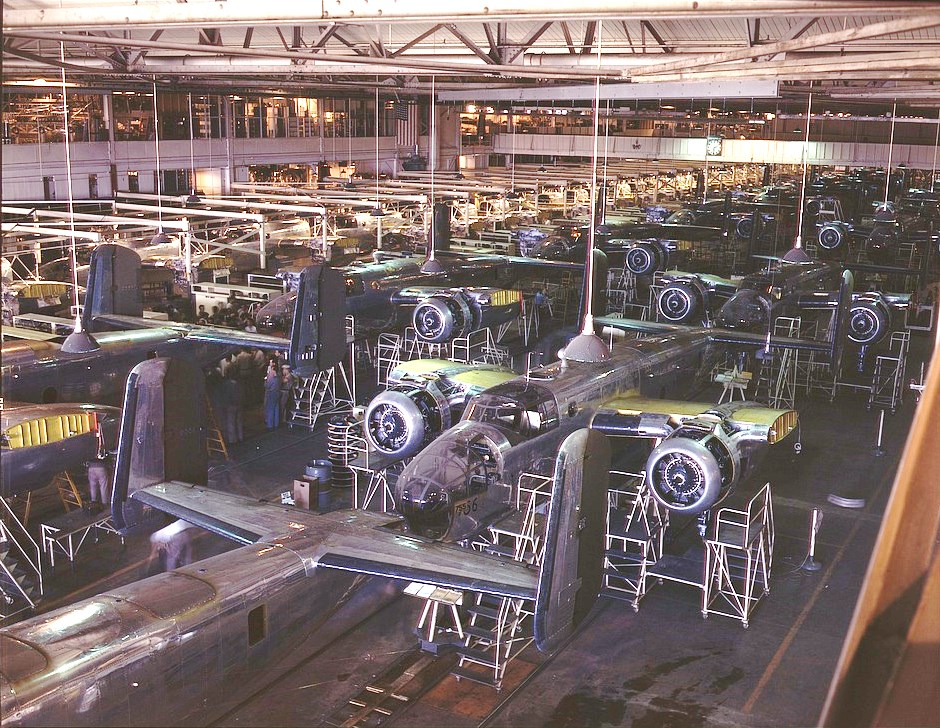
B-25 Mitchell bomber production line at the North American Aviation plant, Inglewood, California, October 1942.

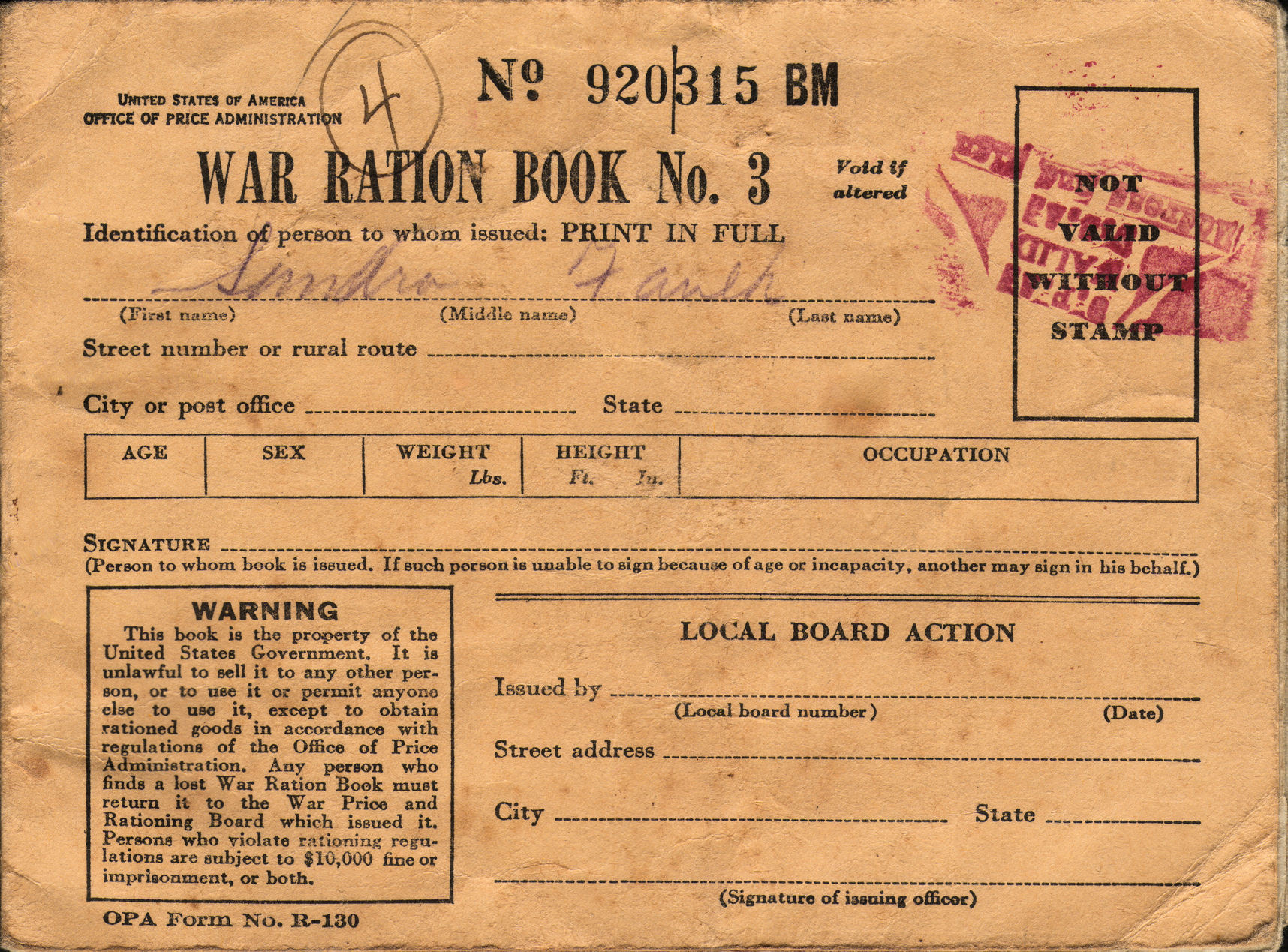
US Ration Book No. 3 circa 1943, front

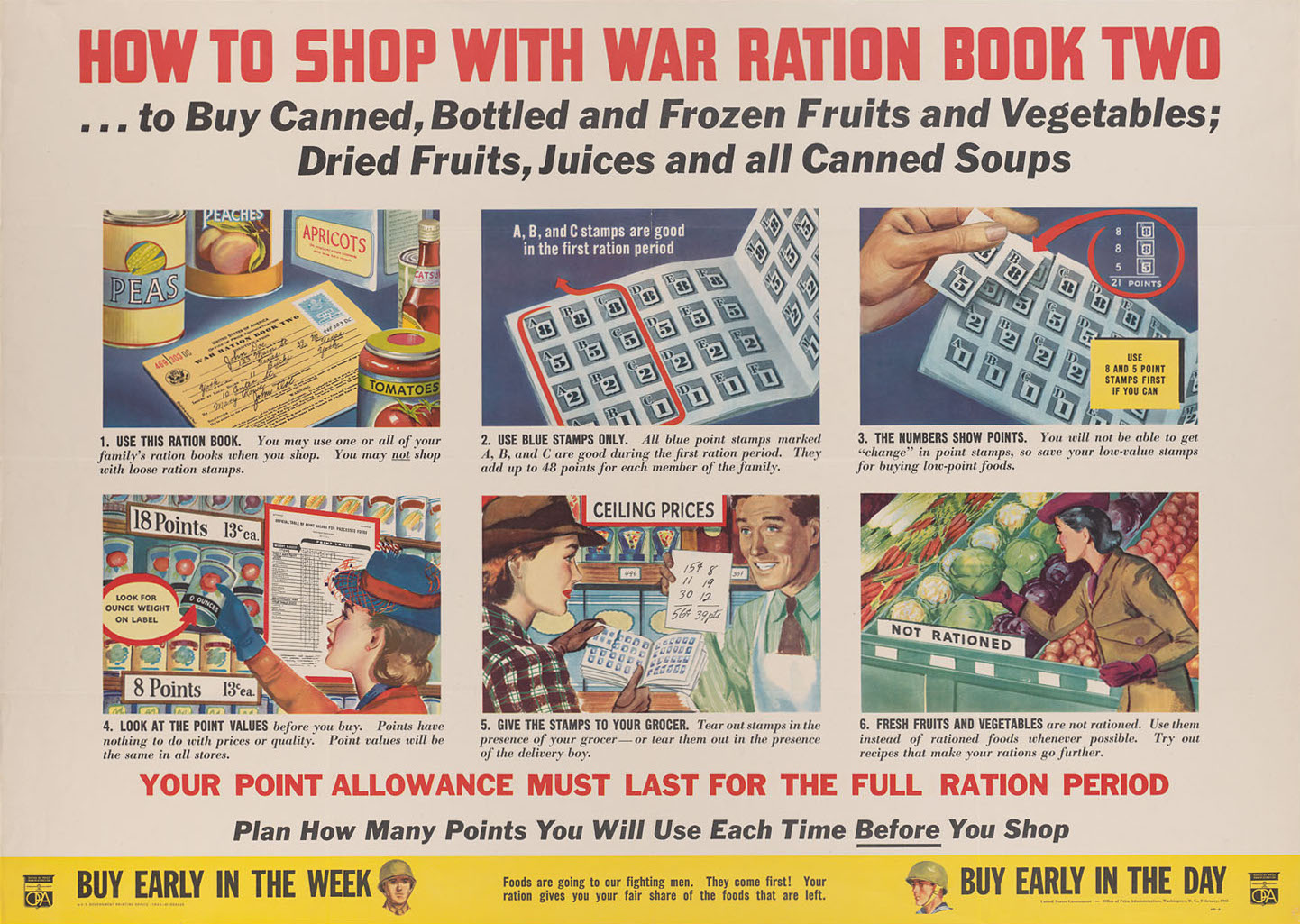
"How to Shop With Ration Book Two", 1943 poster

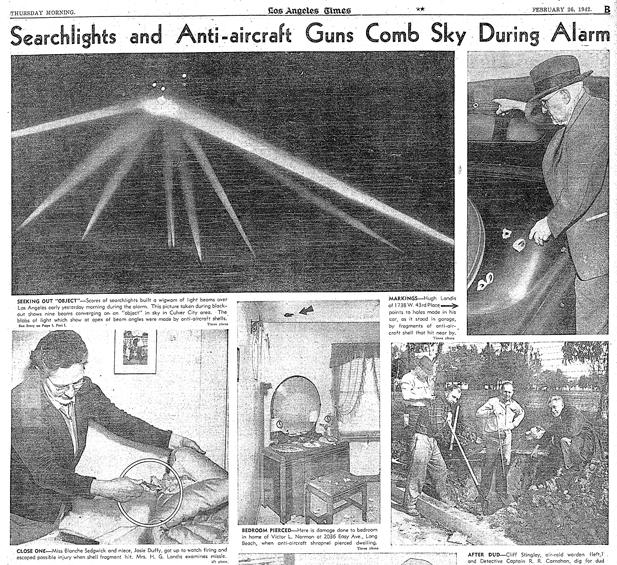
Battle of Los Angeles, Photos from Los Angeles Times, 26 February 1942

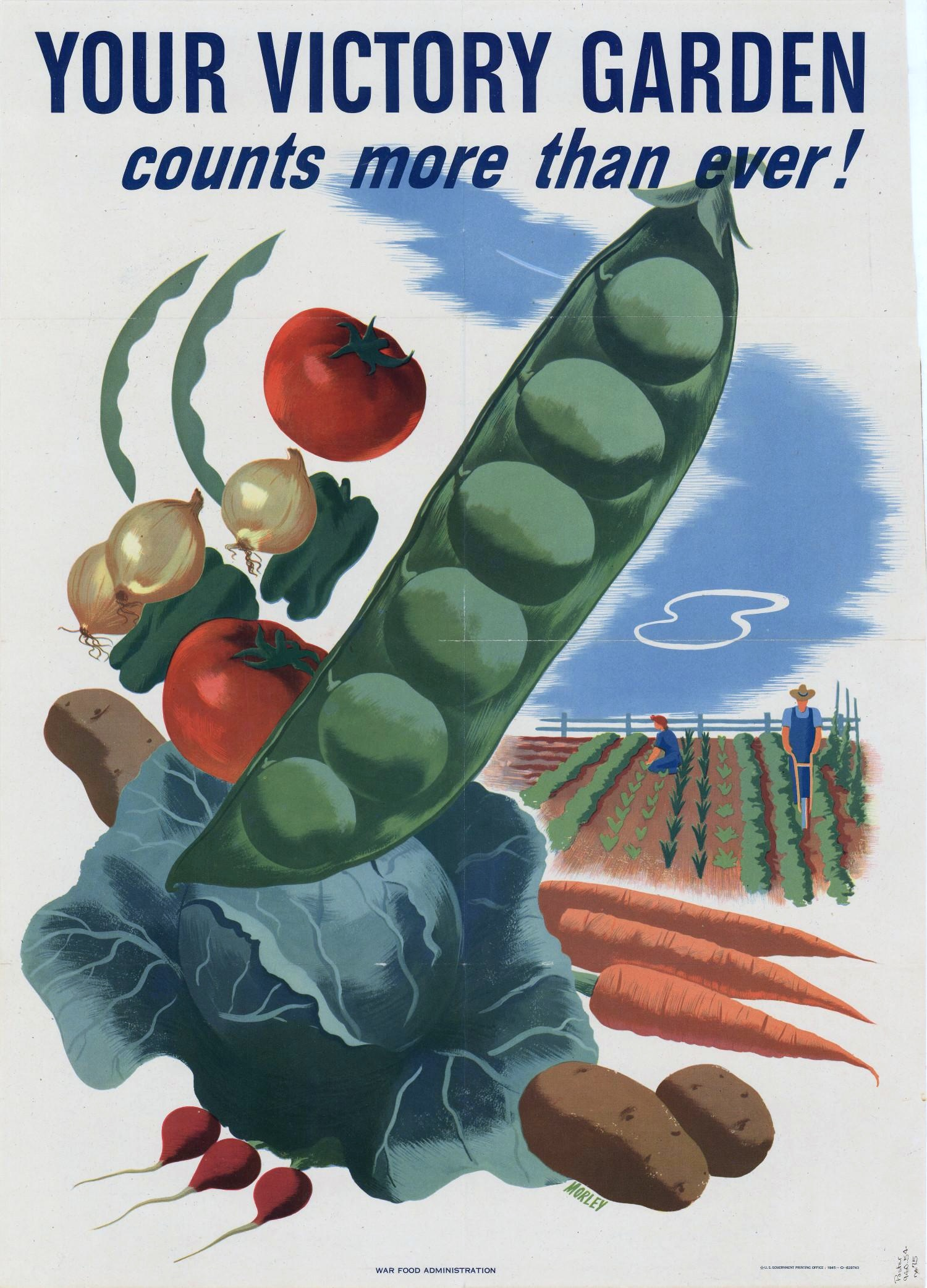
American WWII-era poster promoting Victory gardens

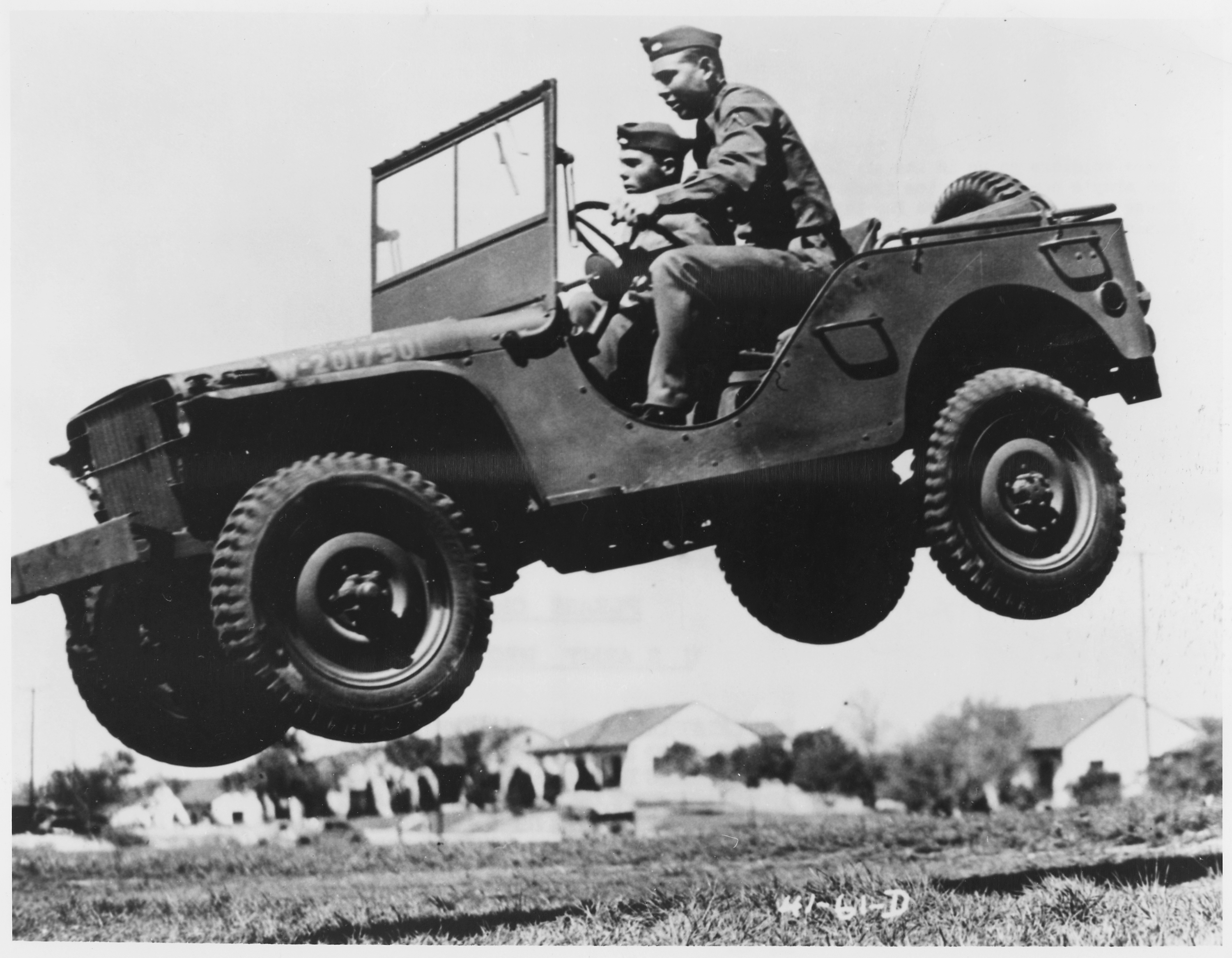
Army testing a California Ford GP (jeep) in 1941.

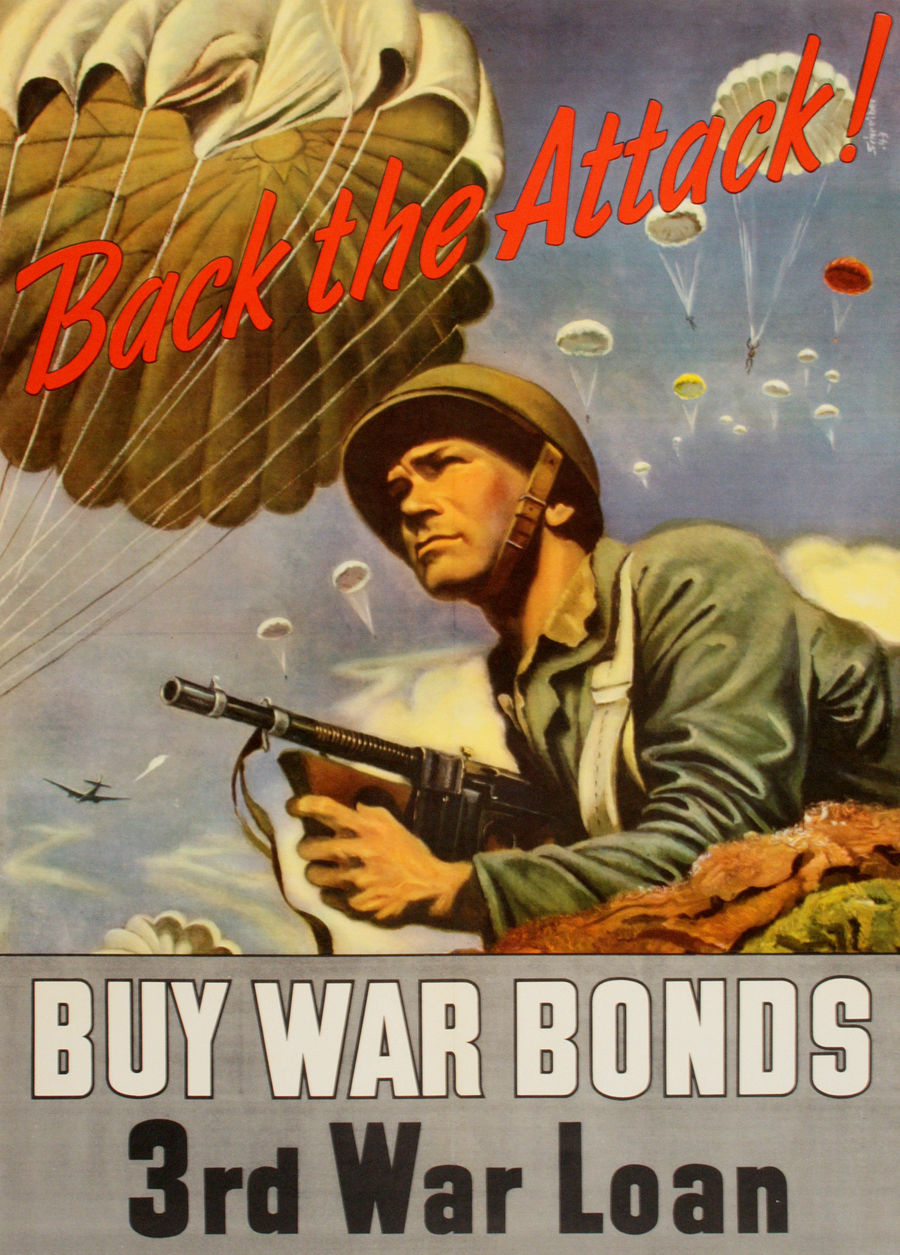
George Schreiber poster for the Third War Loan Drive (September 9 – October 1, 1943)

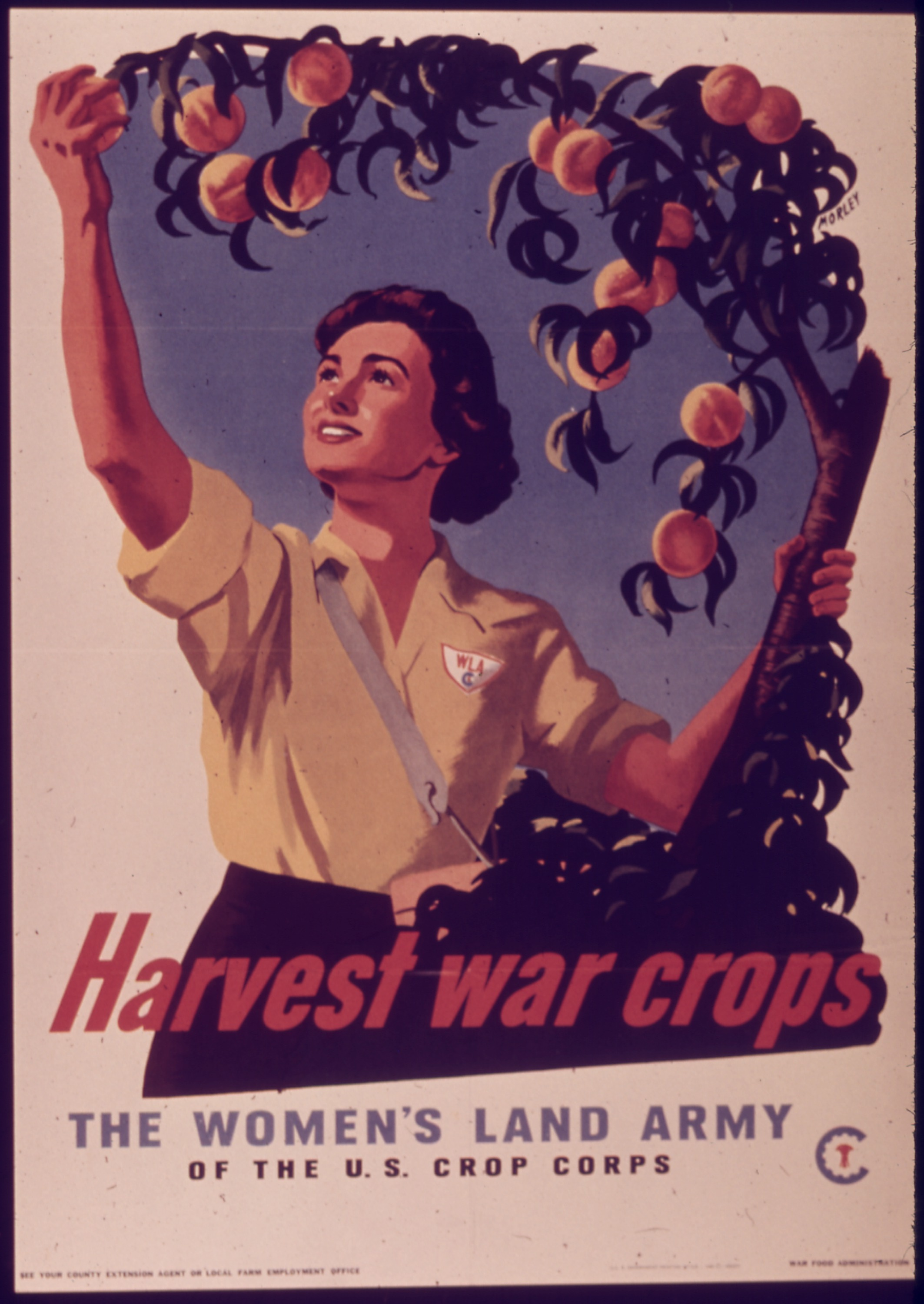
US Crop Corp poster

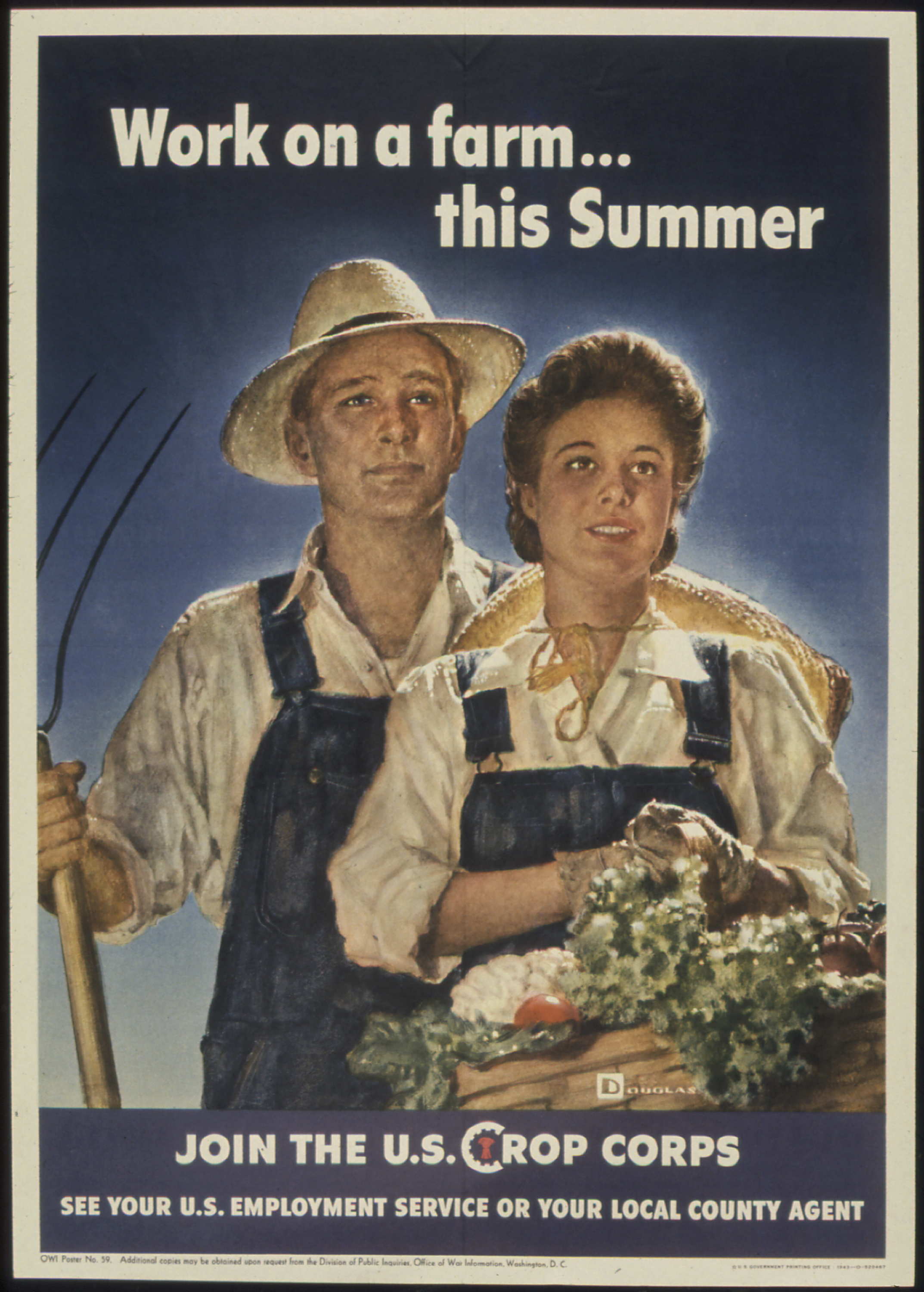
US Crop Corp poster

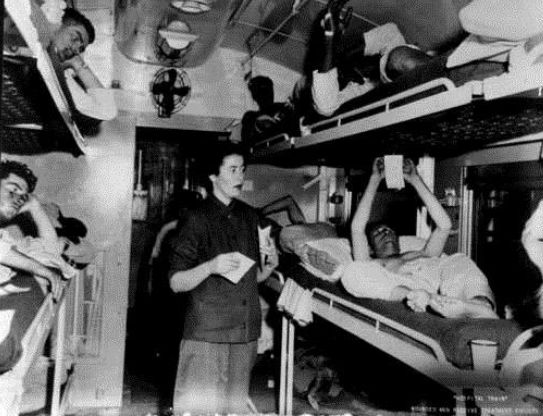
US Army Hospital Train in 1944

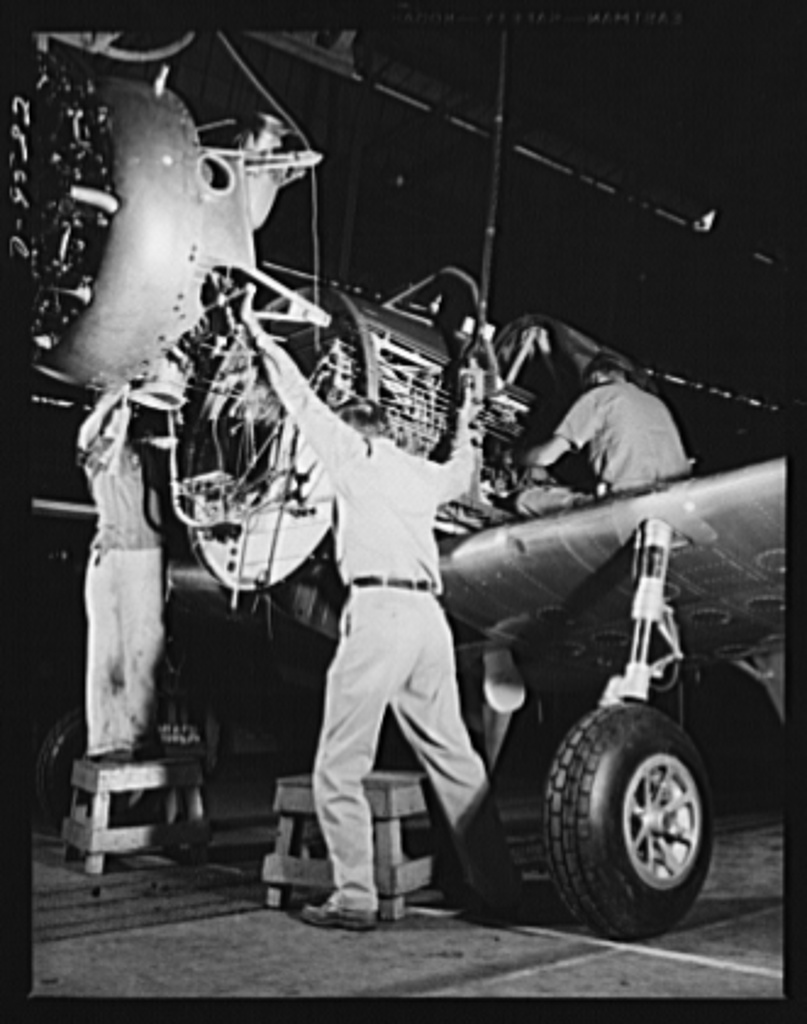
Hanging an engine on a BT-13 Valiant trainer at the Vultee aircraft plant, Downey, California

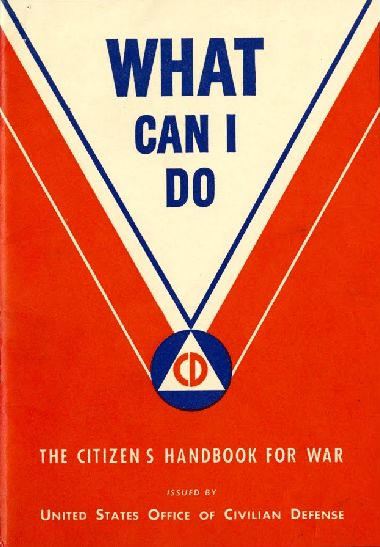
What Can I Do? The Citizen's Handbook for War, U.S. Office of Civilian Defense 1942

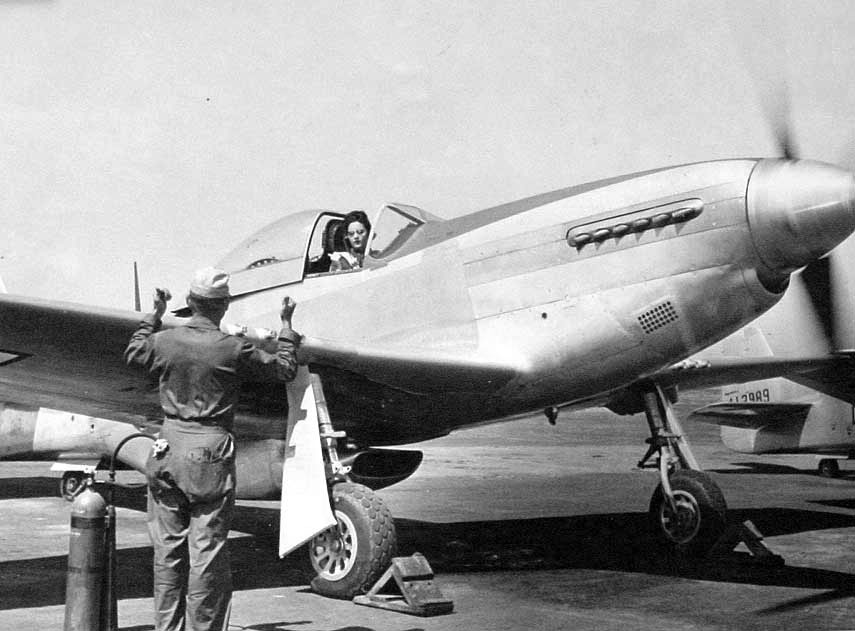
Florene Watson shown preparing a P-51D-5NA for a ferry flight from a factory at Inglewood, California

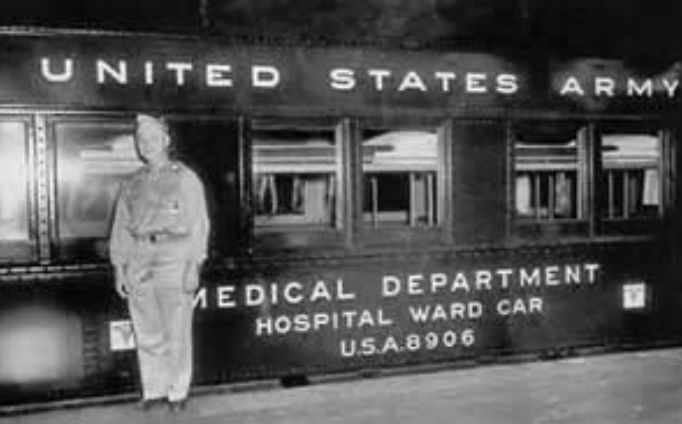
US Army Hospital Car in 1944

== See also ==
- American Theater (1939–1945)
- Arizona during World War II
- Desert Training Center
- Military history of the United States during World War II
- New Mexico during World War II
- United States home front during World War II
- Arnold Scheme
