= Lancaster Airport =

Lancaster Airport may refer to:

- Lancaster Airport (Pennsylvania) in Lancaster, Pennsylvania, United States (FAA: LNS)
- Lancaster Municipal Airport in Lancaster, Wisconsin, United States (FAA: 73C)
- Lancaster Regional Airport (formerly Lancaster Airport) in Lancaster, Texas, United States (FAA: LNC)
- Buffalo-Lancaster Regional Airport (formerly Buffalo-Lancaster Airport) in Lancaster, New York, United States (FAA: BQR)
- Lancaster Airport (California) a defunct airport in Lancaster, California

Other airports in places named Lancaster:

- Fairfield County Airport (Ohio) in Lancaster, Ohio, United States (FAA: LHQ)
- General William J. Fox Airfield in Lancaster, California, United States (FAA: WJF)
- Kirk Air Base in Lancaster, South Carolina, United States (FAA: T73)
- Lancaster County Airport (McWhirter Field) in Lancaster, South Carolina, United States (FAA: LKR)
