= Camp Lamont =

World War II prisoner of war camp in California

Coordinates: 35.1462°N 119.0004°W

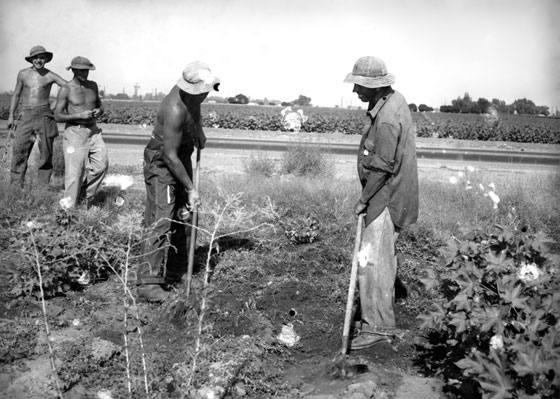
German Prisoners of War at Camp Lamont in 1945

Camp Lamont also called Lamont Prisoner of War Base Camp was a World War II German Prisoners of War camp in the City of Lamont, California, 12 miles southwest from Bakersfield in Kern County. It was formed on December 2, 1944, by the US Department of Agriculture (USDA) transferring 16 acres of land to the US War Department for the US Army. Built at the camp were housing, a mess hall, fencing, guard towers and flood lights. In 1944, Japanese and German prisoners came to Camp Lamont from Camp Cooke, northwest of Lompoc, California. More came the next year from Camp McCoy in Wisconsin and Camp Clarinda in Iowa. Those not seen as a risk were given the option of volunteering to work crops in exchange for coupons they could spend in the camp exchange. They worked on cotton farms, picking the crops. Their labor was used to fill the labor shortage caused by the draft. Prisoners were taken each day by bus or truck to the fields to work. About 4494 German and Japanese POWs were housed at the camp. A German POW committed suicide in camp in early February, 1945. Camp Lamont ran two sub camps: Boswell Ranch, which opened in December 1944 in the city Corcoran, California, in Kings County with 499 prisoners and closed October 5, 1945, and Camp Lakeland, also called the Corcoran Prisoner of War Branch Camp in Corcoran, with 631 prisoners, which opened May 14, 1945, and closed October 5, 1945. Camp Lamont itself closed on July 31, 1946. After the war the Camp Lamont land was returned to the USDA. The land is now private property, with only a few foundations marking the spot of the former camp.

== See also ==
- California during World War II
- Desert Training Center
- Weedpatch Camp

== External Reading ==
Geiger, Jeffrey. (1996) German prisoners of war at Camp Cooke, California. Jefferson, North Carolina: McFarland & Co.

Barba, Ruth Leon; Durham, Mary Louise. (2019) Arvin, Lamont, and Weedpatch. Charleston, South Carolina: Arcadia Publishing.
