= Clyde W. Wood =

Shipyard in Stockton, California, United States

Coordinates: 37.950236°N 121.314688°W

Clyde W. Wood was a shipbuilding company in Stockton, California. To support the World War 2 demand for ships Clyde W. Wood built: tugboats, and US Army barges. Clyde W. Wood started as a construction company paving asphalt and concrete slabs. In 1941 the company opened a small emergency shipyard. The yard first built barges and then tugs for the Army. After World War 2, the shipyard closed in 1945. The yard was located at 1805 Harbor Street, Stockton, the current location of the Penny Newman Grain Terminal. The shipyard was on the Stockton Channel on the deepwater port on the Stockton Ship Channel of the Pacific Ocean and an inland port located more than seventy nautical miles from the ocean, on the Stockton Channel and San Joaquin River-Stockton Deepwater Shipping Channel (before it joins the Sacramento River to empty into Suisun Bay.

== US Army Barge BCS ==
The first US Army Dry Cargo Barge was delivered in 1942, number BCS 211 at a length of 46 feet. Clyde W. Wood delivered 25 of the 46-foot barges. BCS for Barge Cargo Small. These were used to ferry to shore cargo from cargo ships and transport ships arriving at the shallow port theaters of war.

== US Army Tugboats ==
The first US Army Small Harbor Tugboat was delivered in 1944, number TP 97 at a length of 96 feet. Clyde W. Wood delivered 10 tugboats. The tugs had a 183 gross tonnage, a 124 net tonnage, a beam of 24,6 feet, and a draft of 11.5 feet. TP is for Tug/Passenger. The US Army for World War II had a fleet of 43 small wooden-hulled diesel-powered harbor tugs built.

== US Army Barge BC ==
The first US Army 130-foot Dry Cargo Barge was delivered in 1944, number BC 2814 at a length of 130 feet. Clyde W. Wood delivered 120 of the 130-foot barges. BC for Barge Cargo Medium.

== See also ==
- California during World War II
- Maritime history of California
- Wooden boats of World War 2
