= Naval Medical Research Unit One =

Naval Medical Research Unit One was a research laboratory of the US Navy which was founded as Naval Laboratory Research Unit 1, a Naval Reserve Unit at the University of California Berkeley. The unit conducted biomedical research and studied airborne infectious diseases. It also pioneered experiments in chemotherapy, the detection of tubercle bacilli and, the study of physiological stressors in cold weather operations.

== History ==
Naval Laboratory Research Unit 1 was founded in 1934 at the University of California Berkeley by scientist Albert P. Krueger. He campaigned to the Bureau of Medicine and Surgery to have a laboratory to study and prevent influenza and respiratory infections in naval forces. It was mobilized as an active duty naval unit in 1941 to study the epidemiological impact of diseases such as influenza, meningitis, and catarrhal fever, as well as tropical diseases such as malaria on the US Navy during World War II.

In 1943, Naval Laboratory Research Unit-1 was renamed Naval Medical Research Unit No. 1 (NAMRU-1) to reflect its broader mission of field-based and not just lab-based research. In 1950 the lab was moved to the Naval Supply Center, Oakland. Following the start of the Korean War, the Navy became concerned about attacks on its forces by biological weapons, and from 1952 to 1955, the Navy asked Krueger to resign his position on the faculty of Berkeley and devote all his research to the prevention of respiratory infections.

NAMRU-1 was disestablished in 1974.

== Commanding officers ==
- Albert P Krueger 1941-6
