= Camp Ashby =

Temporary installation of the US Army in Berkeley, California

Camp Ashby was a temporary U.S. Army installation sited in Berkeley, California during World War II. It was activated on July 1, 1942. The site contained housing for 30 officers and 612 enlisted and non-commissioned officers. It was located near Ashby and Seventh street. The base was named for Ashby Avenue, a nearby thoroughfare (at the time, part of State Highway 24, now 13), which in turn was named for one of Berkeley's earliest settlers, William Ashby (Aug.1, 1819-July 12, 1896).

Camp Ashby was used to quarter and train the 779th Military Police Battalion, an African American unit led by white officers.
