= Sherman Army Airfield (California) =

- Pleasant Hill, California, U.S.

Site information
- Type: Military airfield
- Controlled by: United States Army Air Forces

Location
- Coordinates: 37.9501°N 122.0601°W

Site history
- Built: 1941
- In use: 1941–1951

Sherman Army Airfield is a former World War II airfield located in Pleasant Hill, California.

== History ==
The 107-acre (43 ha) airfield was named after Dr. Samuel R. Sherman, who helped to provide the financing for the airfield. The field had two runways in an X-shape, with two hangars. The PAA started in 1942 for navigation and instrument flight training with two Stinson Reliants and a Waco VKS-7. Use of the field by the PAA for navigation and instrument flight training ended in 1944. Interstate 680 has been built through the center of the former airport and not a trace of the former airport appears to remain. Houses have been built on the former property and a drive-in movie theatre once occupied the western end of the field but it is now a shopping center. Sherman Field was located northeast of the intersection of Contra Costa Boulevard and Monument Boulevard.

== See also ==
- California World War II Army Airfields
