= Douthitt Strip =

Airport in California

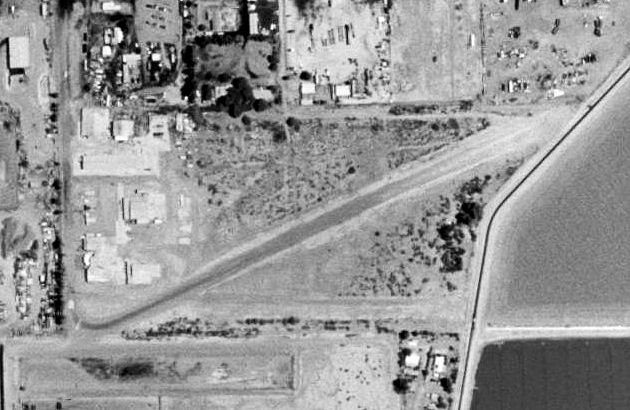
- USGS 2002 orthophoto
- IATA: none; ICAO: none; FAA LID: 23CN

Summary
- Airport type: Private use
- Owner: R. Douthitt Enterprises, Inc.
- Serves: El Centro, California
- Elevation AMSL: 45 ft (14 m)
- Coordinates: 32°47′20″N 115°31′47″W

Map
- Location of airport in California

Runways
Direction	Length		Surface
Direction	ft	m	Surface
4/22	1,800	549	Dirt
8/26	1,400	427	Dirt

Statistics
- Based aircraft: 23
- Source: Federal Aviation Administration

Douthitt Strip (FAA LID: 23CN) is a privately owned, private use airport located one nautical mile (2 km) east of the central business district of El Centro, a city in Imperial County, California, United States.

== History ==
It provided contract glider training to the United States Army Air Forces from 1942 to 1944. Training was provided by Aeronautical Training Center, Inc. It used primarily C-47 Skytrains and Waco CG-4 unpowered gliders. The mission of the school was to train glider pilot students in proficiency in operation of gliders in various types of towed and soaring flight, both day and night, and in servicing gliders in the field.

== Facilities and aircraft ==
Douthitt Strip has two runways with dirt surfaces: 4/22 is 1,800 by 100 feet (549 x 30 m) and 8/26 is 1,400 by 100 feet (427 x 30 m). There are 23 aircraft based at this airport: 91% single-engine and 9% ultralight.

== See also ==
- California World War II Army Airfields

== Other sources ==
- Manning, Thomas A. (2005), History of Air Education and Training Command, 1942–2002. Office of History and Research, Headquarters, AETC, Randolph AFB, Texas OCLC 71006954, 29991467
- Shaw, Frederick J. (2004), Locating Air Force Base Sites, History’s Legacy, Air Force History and Museums Program, United States Air Force, Washington DC. OCLC 57007862, 1050653629
