= United States Navy Net Depot Tiburon =

The United States Navy Net Depot Tiburon was a military facility charged with maintaining and deploying an anti-submarine net across the Golden Gate between San Francisco and Marin County during World War II.
