= Flying S Ranch Airport =

- IATA: none; ICAO: none

Summary
- Airport type: Private
- Owner: R. J. Smith
- Location: Kern County, near Caliente, California
- Elevation AMSL: 3,485 ft / 1,062 m
- Coordinates: 35°24′25″N 118°30′07″W
- Interactive map of Flying S Ranch Airport

Runways
Direction	Length		Surface
Direction	ft	m	Surface
07/25	3,750	1,143	Dirt

Flying S Ranch Airport (FAA LID: 62CL) is a private airport located approximately 10 miles (16 km) northeast of Caliente, California.

== History ==
During World War II it was a United States Army Airfield, known as Caliente Flight Strip. It was one of the many Flight Strips which were built by the USAAF during the war for the emergency use of military aircraft.

The Caliente Flight Strip was listed on a table of Second Air Force Flight Strips which indicated that construction of the strip was completed in 1943. The strip was described as consisting of a 6,400' paved runway, adjacent to the south side of Route 93 but labeled merely as “FS-2”. It is not known what military use (if any) the Caliente Flight Strip ever had.

Sold by the WAA as a private airport after the war, the airfield was sold in July 1967 to its present owners.
