= Lancaster Airport (California) =

Former airport in Los Angeles County, California

- IATA: none; ICAO: none

Summary
- Airport type: Public/military
- Operator: W. B. Carter; United States Army Air Forces
- Location: Lancaster, California
- Opened: 1929
- Closed: 1949
- Coordinates: 34°42′39″N 118°09′25″W
- Interactive map of Lancaster Airport

Runways
Direction	Length		Surface
Direction	ft	m	Surface
E/W	2,250	686	Dirt
N/S	1,350	411	Dirt

Lancaster Airport was an airport about 1.5 miles (2.4 km) northwest of Lancaster, California. It was closed in the late 1940s and is now a housing development.

== History ==
The airport was established about 1929 as a municipal airport, operated by W. B. Carter. The airport was said to have 2 dirt runways in an “L” shape: 2,250' east/west & 1,350' north/south. A hangar on the southeast corner was said to be marked with “Lancaster”.

After the war the airport returned to general aviation operations until it closed about 1949. The land was redeveloped into suburban housing, although traces of the airport could be seen in aerial photography until about 1970.

== See also ==
- California World War II Army Airfields
