= 35th Flying Training Wing =

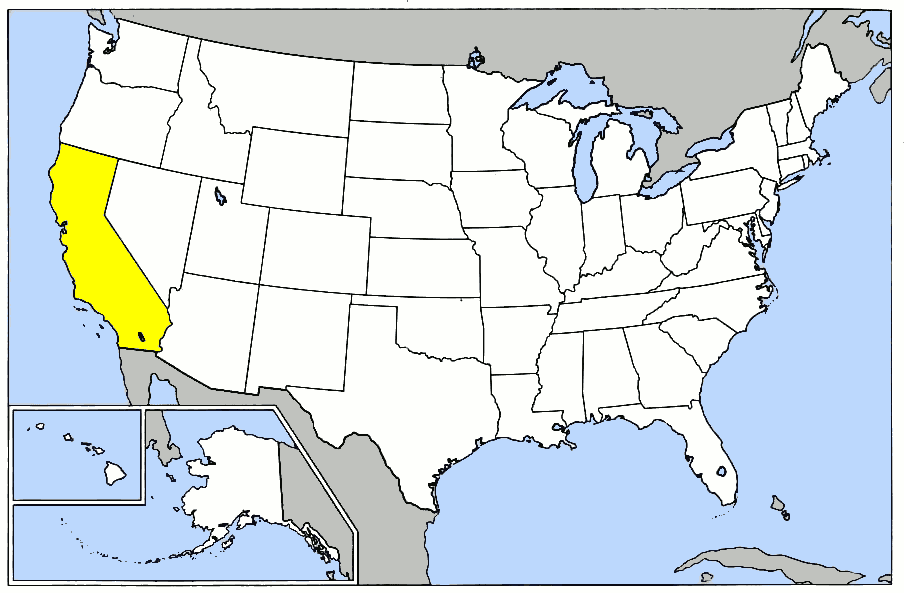
- Locations of airfields controlled by the 35th Flying Training Wing
- Active: 1942–1946
- Country: United States
- Branch: United States Army Air Forces
- Type: Command and Control
- Role: Training
- Part of: Army Air Forces Training Command
- Engagements: World War II: World War II American Theater

The 35th Flying Training Wing is an inactive United States Air Force unit. It was last assigned to the Western Flying Training Command, and was disbanded on 16 June 1946 at the Minter Field, California.

There is no lineage between the United States Air Force 35th Fighter Wing, established on 10 August 1948 at Irumagawa Airbase, Japan, and this organization.

== History ==
The wing was a World War II Command and Control organization which supported Western Flying Training Command Flight Schools in California. Most of the assigned schools provided phase II basic flying training for Air Cadets, although the wing also commanded both contract basic (phase I) and advanced single and two-engine Army schools. In addition, an advanced navigation school at Mather Field for Air Cadets selected at the Santa Ana Classification Center was controlled by the wing. Graduates of the advanced schools were commissioned as Second Lieutenants, received their "wings" and were reassigned to Operational or Replacement Training Units operated by one of the four numbered air fores in the zone of interior.

As training requirements changed during the war, schools were activated and inactivated or transferred to meet those requirements.

=== Lineage ===
- Established as 35th Flying Training Wing on 17 December 1942

Activated on 8 January 1943
Disbanded 16 June 1946.

=== Assignments ===
- AAF West Coast (later, AAF Western Flying) Training Center, 8 January 1943 – 16 June 1946

=== Training aircraft ===
The schools of the wing used a wide variety of planes to support its numerous training needs:

- Primary training aircraft were the Boeing-Stearman PT-17 and Ryan PT-22. PT-13 and PT-27 aircraft were also used which were basic Stearmans with varying horsepower ratings.

Beginning in late 1944 the USAAF (as well as the USN) began replacing the Vultee BT-13 / BT-15 Valiant from the Basic phase of flight training with the North American AT-6 Texan

- The Vultee BT-13 was the basic training aircraft, along with the higher-horsepower Vultee BT-15
- The North American AT-6 was used as the single-engine advanced trainer
- The Cessna AT-17 Bobcat was the standard two-engine advanced trainer, along with the Cessna UC-78 variant of the AT-17; Curtiss-Wright AT-9s were used at Mather and Stockton Fields for high performance two-engine training in perpetration for Lockheed P-38 Lightning training by IV Fighter Command.
- Specialized two-engine bomber trainers at Mather Field were the Lockheed AT-18 Hudsons along with North American B-25 Mitchells. The Beechcraft AT-7 was used for two-engine pilot training and also navigator training at Mather

=== Assigned Pilot Schools ===
Chico Army Airfield. Chico, California
Army Flying School
97th Basic Flying Training Group
Opened: September 1941, Closed: March 1944 (BT-13)
Aircraft carried Fuselage Code "M" Fuselage code "M" was originally assigned to Moffett Field when it was a USAAC base. In 1942 Moffett Field was returned to the USN and the USAAC transferred its assets to Chico. The BT-13's retained the fuselage code of "M"; Transferred to IV Fighter Command, May 1944, became P-38, P-63 Replacement Training Unit; closed September 1945

Dos Palos Airport, Firebaugh/Dos Palos, California
AAF Contract Pilot School (Primary)
13th Flying Training Detachment
Opened: June 1942, Closed: November 1944 (PT-13, PT-22, BT-13)
Aircraft carried Fuselage Code "B"; Operated by: Coast Aviation Corporation

Gardner Army Airfield, Taft, California
AAF Basic Flying School
98th Basic Flying Training Group
Opened: August 1941, Closed: February 1945 (BT-13)
Aircraft carried Fuselage Code "F"

Santa Maria Army Airfield, Santa Maria, California
AAF Contract Pilot School (Primary)
1st Flying Training Detachment
Opened: September 1939, Closed: February 1945 (PT-13, PT-27)
Operated by: Hancock College of Aeronautics, one of the original nine civilian contract Army Primary Training Schools; transferred to IV Fighter Command, May 1944, became P-38 Replacement Training Unit; had five auxiliary airfields, closed July 1945

Lemoore Army Airfield, Lemoore, California
AAF Basic Flying School
97th Basic Flying Training Group
Opened: January 1942, Closed: August 1945 (BT-13, BT-15)
Aircraft carried Fuselage Code "R" Also operated advanced two-engine flying school (AT-17, UC-78), November 1943; both schools closed August 1945

Mather Field, Sacramento, California
AAF Advanced Single-Engine Flying School
AAF Specialized Two-Engine Flying School, also Two-Engine Transition
AAF Navigation School
Opened: May 1941, Closed: August 1945 (AT-6)
Former World War I flying training airfield, reopened May 1941; also AAF Navigation School, August 1941 (AT-7, AT-9); Specialized Two-Engine Flying School, June 1943 (AT-18, B-25); Aircraft carried Fuselage Code "T" and "I", "I" for aircraft assigned to the Centralized Flight Instructors Program; became permanent training airfield after World War II as Mather Air Force Base; Closed 1993.

Merced Army Airfield, Merced, California
AAF Basic Flying School
AAF Advanced Single-Engine Flying School
Opened: September 1941, Closed: October 1944 (BT-13)
Aircraft carried Fuselage Code "E" Advanced Flying School (AT-6) opened June 1944; became permanent airfield after World War II as Castle Air Force Base; Closed 1993.

Minter Field, Shafter, California
AAF Basic Flying School
AAF Specialized Two-Engine Flying School, also Two-Engine Transition
Opened: June 1941, Closed: June 1944 (BT-13)
Aircraft carried Fuselage Code "L" Basic Flying School closed June 1944; Two-Engine Flying School opened June 1944 (AT-6, AT-17, UC-78. B-25), closed December 1945.

Palo Alto Airport, King City, California
3d Flying Training Detachment
Opened: March 1941, Closed: October 1944 (PT-13, PT-17, PT-22)
transferred to Navy April 1945

Rankin Field, Tulare, California
AAF Contract Pilot School (Primary)
4th Flying Training Detachment
Opened: March 1941, Closed: October 1944 (PT-13, PT-17)
Operated by: Rankin Aeronautical Academy

Sequoia Field, Visalia, California
AAF Contract Pilot School (Primary)
8th Flying Training Detachment
Opened: September 1941, Closed: September 1944 (PT-13, PT-17, PT-22)
Also known as Visalia Army Airfield; Operated by: Visalia-Dinuba School of Aeronautics; primary flight school closed September 1944, transferred to IV Fighter Command and became P-61 Black Widow Replacement Training Unit

Stockton Field, Stockton, California
AAF Advanced Flying School, Single-Engine
AAF Basic Flying School
AAF Advanced Flying School, Two-Engine
316th Two-Engine Flying Training Group
Opened: December 1940, Closed: December 1942 (AT-6)
Aircraft carried Fuselage Code "M"; Opened initially as single engine school; May 1942 added Basic School (BT-15) two-engine school opened November 1943 (AT-9, AT-17, UC-78); closed February 1945; Transferred to Air Transport Command as a C-47 training base, March 1945; closed January 1946.

Victorville Army Airfield, Victoville, California
AAF Advanced Flying School (Bombardment)
AAF Advanced Flying School, Specialized Single-Engine
AAF Advanced Flying School, Specialized Two/Four-Engine Transition
AAF Glider Flying School
98th Basic Flying Training Group
Opened: February 1942, Closed: August 1945 (AT-6, AT-9, AT-11, AT-17, BT-13, B-24, CG-4, C-47)
Aircraft carried Fuselage Code "V"; had at least four auxiliary airfields; remained open after the war ended, became George Air Force Base; closed 1992

=== Stations ===
- Merced Army Airfield California, 8 January 1943
- Minter Field, California, 11 September 1943 – 16 June 1946

== See also ==
- Army Air Forces Training Command
- Other Training Command Basic Flight Training Wings:

29th Flying Training Wing (World War II) Eastern Flying Training Command
32d Flying Training Wing (World War II) Central Flying Training Command

- Other Western Flying Training Command Flight Training Wings:

36th Flying Training Wing (World War II) Primary Flight Training
37th Flying Training Wing (World War II) Basic/Advanced Flight Training (Arizona)
38th Flying Training Wing (World War II) Bombardier and Specialized 2/4-Engine Training
81st Flying Training Wing (World War II) Classification/Preflight Unit
