= California World War II Army airfields =

California World War II Army Airfields
- Part of United States Army

Site information
- Type: Army Airfields

Location
- Map of Major California World War II Army Airfields: Fourth Air Force; AAF Training Command; AAF Contract Flying Schools; Air Transport Command; Technical Service Command

Site history
- Built: 1940–1944
- In use: 1940–present

During World War II, the United States Army Air Forces (USAAF) established numerous airfields in California for training pilots and aircrews of USAAF fighters and bombers.

Most of these airfields were under the command of Fourth Air Force or the Army Air Forces Training Command (AAFTC). However, Air Technical Service Command (ATSC), Air Transport Command (ATC) and I Troop Carrier Command used a significant number of airfields in a support role. A significant number of them had operational squadrons for air defense of the Pacific coastline and anti-submarine patrols, and one was even handed over to Civil Air Patrol pilots for their use.

In addition to the major fields, dozens of minor auxiliary fields and airstrips were built, generally to provide more room for basic flight training, but also to support other operations. A few of these were designed as "fallback fields" for launching defensive operations in case of a Japanese invasion.

Most Army airfields were built with three runways in a triangle, with parking ramp areas adjacent to one runway. This triangular configuration allowed rapid construction, without regard to the direction of the prevailing winds. Navy fields were generally built with two runways in a cross, with a third runway intersecting the other two at an angle.

There were, of course, other designs, including single-runway fields. Most noteworthy were "landing mats", large concrete squares, hexagons and circles, which allowed takeoffs and landings in any direction.

Following the war, many bases and auxiliary fields were given to local governments or returned to service as municipal airports. Often, budget constraints caused the new owners to close or even remove the "extra" runways, retaining only those that faced into the prevailing winds. In at least one case (Orland), large portions of a landing mat were removed, leaving a conventional runway and ramp.

Several fields were retained as United States Air Force installations and were front-line bases during the Cold War, or used for experimental aviation, the most notable of these being Edwards Air Force Base.

A few were sold or given back to private owners, generally to be returned to agricultural use, while a handful have become private airports. A number of fields were simply abandoned, due to their remote locations, and the remains of these can still be found, especially in the Mojave Desert.

== Major airfields ==
=== Fourth Air Force ===
The mission of Fourth Air Force was the air defense of the West Coast, operating two air defense wings in California (Los Angeles and San Francisco). It also provided operational training of newly formed groups and squadrons in combat aircraft prior to their deployment to overseas combat theaters. After April 1944, operational training was changed to replacement training of newly commissioned pilots in combat fighters from the AAF Training Command advanced flying schools.

- Chandler Municipal Airport, 2 miles (3.2 km) west of Fresno

Briefly used in 1941 While Hammer Army Airfield under construction
Now: Fresno Chandler Executive Airport (IATA: FCH, ICAO: KFCH, FAA LID: FCH)

- Chico Army Airfield, 5 miles (8.0 km) north of Chico

Army Air Forces Basic Flying School / Army Air Force Pilot School, Basic, 24 March 1942–25 April 1944
10th Base Headquarters an Air Base Squadron, 12 July 1942–25 April 1944
433rd Army Air Force Base Unit (Combat Crew Training Station, Fighter), 25 April 1944–31 October 1945
Now: Chico Municipal Airport
(IATA: CIC, ICAO: KCIC, FAA LID: CIC)
Known sub-bases and auxiliaries

Orland Auxiliary Field
Kirkwood Auxiliary Field
Vina Auxiliary Field
Campbell Auxiliary Field
Oroville Auxiliary Field
Sacramento Municipal Airport
Oroville Army Airfield
Siskiyou County Army Airfield
Redding Army Airfield

- Daggett Municipal Airport, Daggett

Now: Barstow-Daggett Airport (IATA: DAG, ICAO: KDAG)

- Hamilton Army Airfield, 7 miles (11 km), Novato, north of San Rafael

Air Base Squadron, 45th Air Base Group / 46th Air Base Squadron/ 46th Base Headquarters and Air Base Squadron, 25 August 1940–1 April 1944
460th Army Air Force Base Unit (Base Services, Air Transport Command), 1 April 1944–8 May 1946
Hq, West Coast Wing, Air Transport Command, 1 August 1944–4 December 1945
Was: Hamilton Air Force Base (1947–1976)
Now: Part of the Hamilton Wetland Restoration Project
Known sub-bases and auxiliaries

Montague Air Force Auxiliary Field
Napa Army Airfield
Willows Municipal Airport
Redding Army Airfield
Siskiyou County Army Airfield

- Hammer Army Airfield, 5 miles (8.0 km) northeast of Fresno

Joint Use with United States Navy (NATS)
50th Air Base Squadron / 50th Base Headquarters and Air Base Squadron, 2 August 1941–31 March 1944
450th Army Air Force Base Unit (Combat Crew Training Station, Night Fighter), 1 April 1944–15 March 1946
Now: Fresno Air National Guard Base (IATA: FAT, ICAO: KFAT)
Known sub-bases and auxiliaries

Salinas Army Air Base
Delano Army Airfield
Meadows Field
Visalia Army Airfield
Hayward Army Airfield

- Lemoore Army Airfield, 9 miles (14 km) southwest of Lemoore

Air Corps Basic Flying School / AAF Basic Flying School / AAF Pilot School, Basic; 30 November 1941–1 June 1944
88th Air Base Squadron / 88th Base Headquarters and Air Base Squadron; 12 December 1941–30 April 1944
3023rd Army Air Force Base Unit (Pilot School, Basic); 1 May 1944–1 June 1944
461st Army Air Force Base Unit (Processing In); 1 June 1944–10 November 1945
Now: non-flying agricultural use.
Known sub-bases and auxiliaries

Boston Field
Huron Field
Indian Field
Murray Field
West Field
Summit Lake Field (Now NAS Lemoore)
Helm Field
Corcoran Municipal Airport
Porterville Army Airfield
Coalinga Municipal Airport (Old)

- March Army Airfield, 10 miles (16 km) southeast of Riverside

Base Headquarters and 4th Air Base Squadron; 1 September 1936–1 September 1940
4th Air Base Group; 1 September 1940–15 January 1941
Air Base Squadron, 32nd Air Base Group / 31st Air Base Squadron / 31st Base Headquarters and Air Base Squadron; 15 January 1941–31 March 1944
420th Army Air Force Base Unit (Combat Crew Training Station, Heavy Bombardment); 1 April 1944–31 March 1946
Was: March Air Force Base (1947–1993)
Now: March Air Reserve Base
Known sub-bases and auxiliaries

Buffalo Springs Airport
Needles Army Airfield
Shavers Summit Army Airfield

- Marysville Army Airfield, 3 miles (4.8 km) south of Marysville.

Now: Yuba County Airport (IATA: MYV, ICAO: KMYV)

- Muroc Army Airfield, 23 miles (37 km) southeast of Mojave

323rd Air Base Sq / 323rd Base Headquarters and Air Base Sq; 1 May 1942–31 March 1944
421st Army Air Force Base Unit (Combat Crew Training Station, Heavy Bombardment); 1 April 1944–16 October 1945
Now: Edwards Air Force Base
Known sub-bases and auxiliaries

Bishop Army Airfield
Blythe Army Airfield
Palmdale Army Airfield
Desert Center Army Airfield
Gary Army Airfield
Rice Army Airfield
Muroc Flight Test Base

- Ontario Army Airfield, 1-mile (1.6 km) east of Ontario

311th Army Air Force Base Unit
Now: Ontario International Airport
(IATA: ONT, ICAO: KONT, FAA LID: ONT)

- Salinas Army Air Base, 3 miles (4.8 km) southeast of Salinas

301st Base Headquarters and Air Base Squadron
Also used by Air Transport Command
Now: Salinas Municipal Airport (IATA: SNS, ICAO: KSNS, FAA LID: SNS)
Known sub-bases and auxiliaries

Half Moon Bay Flight Strip

- Santa Maria Army Airfield, Santa Maria

483d Army Air Force Base Unit
Now: Santa Maria Public Airport (IATA: SMX, ICAO: KSMX)
Known sub-bases and auxiliaries

Estrella Army Airfield

- Santa Rosa Army Airfield, 7 miles (11 km) northwest of Santa Rosa

493d Army Air Force Base Unit
Now: Charles M. Schulz - Sonoma County Airport
(IATA: STS, ICAO: KSTS, FAA LID: STS)

- Thermal Army Airfield, 2 miles (3.2 km) southwest of Thermal

Joint Use with United States Navy
VI Air Support Command (AGF)
475th Army Air Force Base Unit
Now: Jacqueline Cochran Regional Airport
(IATA: TRM, ICAO: KTRM)

- Van Nuys Army Airfield, Van Nuys

505th Army Air Force Base Unit
Was: Van Nuys Air National Guard Base (1946–1990)
Now: Van Nuys Airport (IATA: VNY, ICAO: KVNY)
Known sub-bases and auxiliaries

Grand Central Air Terminal
Oxnard Flight Strip

Was: Oxnard Air Force Base (1951–1970)
Now: Camarillo Airport

=== AAF Training Command ===
Training Command airfields in California provided Primary, Basic and Advanced (both single and multi-engine) pilot training under the Army Air Force Flying Training Command. Mather AAF provided Navigator Training. Training Command also provided technical aircraft support training to both enlisted and officer personnel at aircraft delivery fields, operated by manufacturers such as North American, Douglas, Northrup, Lockheed and Consolidated Aircraft. Santa Ana AAB provided basic indoctrination training to new enlisted personnel and also pilot qualification screening for prospective air cadets.

- Gardner Army Airfield, 10 miles (16 km) southeast of Taft

63d Army Air Force Base Unit
Now: Agricultural Use
Known sub-bases and auxiliaries

Parker Auxiliary Airfield
Kern Field Auxiliary Airfield
Allen Auxiliary Airfield
Conners Auxiliary Airfield
Taft Auxiliary Airfield
Cuyama Auxiliary Airfield

- Mather Army Airfield, 10 miles (16 km) east of Sacramento

67th Army Air Force Base Unit
Also used by: Air Transport Command
Was: Mather Air Force Base (1947–1993)
Now: Sacramento Mather Airport
(IATA: MHR, ICAO: KMHR, FAA LID: MHR)
Known sub-bases and auxiliaries

Concord Army Airfield
Franklin Auxiliary Airfield
Lincoln Auxiliary Airfield
Winters-Davis Flight Strip
Elk Grove Auxiliary Airfield

- Victorville Army Airfield, 6 miles (9.7 km) northwest of Victorville

87th Army Air Force Base Unit
Was: George Air Force Base (1947–1992)
Now: Southern California Logistics Airport
(IATA: VCV, ICAO: KVCV)
Known sub-bases and auxiliaries

Hawes Auxiliary Airfield
Helendale Auxiliary Airfield
Mirage Auxiliary Airfield
Grey Butte Auxiliary Airfield

- Santa Ana Army Air Base, 5 miles (8.0 km) south of Santa Ana

414th Army Air Force Base Unit
Known sub-bases and auxiliaries

Orange County Army Airfield
Now: John Wayne Airport
(IATA: SNA, ICAO: KSNA, FAA LID: SNA)

- Minter Field Army Airfield, 14 miles (23 km) northwest of Bakersfield

64th Army Air Force Base Unit
Now: Shafter-Minter Field Airport
(IATA: MIT, ICAO: KMIT)
Known sub-bases and auxiliaries

Wasco Auxiliary Airfield
Pond Auxiliary Field
Famoso Auxiliary Airfield
Dunlap Auxiliary Airfield
Semi-tropic Auxiliary Airfield
Poso Auxiliary Airfield
Lost Hills Auxiliary Airfield
Coalinga Municipal Airport (Old)

- Stockton Army Airfield, 3 miles (4.8 km) south of Stockton

60th Army Air Force Base Unit
Also used by: Air Transport Command
Now: Stockton Metropolitan Airport
(IATA: SCK, ICAO: KSCK, FAA LID: SCK)
Known sub-bases and auxiliaries

Kingsbury Auxiliary Airfield
New Jerusalem Auxiliary Airfield
Modesto Auxiliary Airfield
Tracy Auxiliary Airfield
Franklin Auxiliary Airfield

- Merced Army Airfield, 6 miles (9.7 km) northwest of Merced

HQ Continental Air Forces
90th Army Air Force Base Unit
Was: Castle Air Force Base (1947–1995)
Now: Castle Airport (IATA: MER, ICAO: KMER, FAA LID: MER)
Known sub-bases and auxiliaries

Merced Municipal Airport Auxiliary Field
Ballico Auxiliary Field
Howard Auxiliary Field
Athlone Auxiliary Field
Potter Auxiliary Field
Merced New Municipal Airport Auxiliary Field
Mariposa Auxiliary Field

==== AAF contract flying schools ====
Private flying schools operated under contract by Flying Training Command, providing primary pilot training to new air cadets. Although training was provided by civilian contractors and instruction was provided by civilian instructors, the schools were commanded by military personnel and were operated as a military base. These schools operated from early 1942 until being phased out in mid-1944. Graduates then advanced to regular Training Command flight schools for Basic and Advanced training.

- Eagle Field, 7 miles (11 km) southeast of Dos Palos

(FAA LID: CL01)
Operated by: Coast Aviation Corporation
Known sub-bases and auxiliaries

Hammond Auxiliary Field
Vail Auxiliary Field
Dos Palos Emergency Field
Canal Field Auxiliary Field
Mason Auxiliary Field

- Gary Field, 4 miles (6.4 km) northwest of Blythe

Operated by: Morton Air Academy
Now: W R Byron Airport (Private) (FAA LID: 44CA)
Known sub-bases and auxiliaries

Ripley Auxiliary Field#1
Ripley Auxiliary Field#2

- Hancock Field, 1 mile (1.6 km) east-southeast of Santa Maria

Operated by: Allen Hancock College of Aeronautics
Now: Closed about 1959, now Allan Hancock College
Known sub-bases and auxiliaries

Santa Maria Auxiliary Field
La Brea Auxiliary Field
Mckinnon Auxiliary Field
Souza Auxiliary Field
Waller-Franklin Auxiliary Field

- Lone Pine Airport, 1 mile (1.6 km) southeast of Lone Pine

(FAA LID: 026)
Operated by: Undetermined
Known sub-bases and auxiliaries

Adamson Landing Field
Independence Auxiliary Field
Inyo County Auxiliary Field

- King City Airport, 1 mile (1.6 km) southeast of King City

Operated by: Undetermined
Now: Mesa Del Rey Airport (IATA: KIC, ICAO: KKIC, FAA LID: KIC)
Known sub-bases and auxiliaries

Benard Auxiliary Field
Hanson Auxiliary Field
Sorenson Auxiliary Field
Trescony Auxiliary Field

- McChesney Field, 3 miles (4.8 km) southeast of San Luis Obispo

Operated by: Undetermined
Now: San Luis Obispo County Regional Airport (IATA: SBP, ICAO: KSBP, FAA LID: SBP)

- Rankin Field, 6 miles (9.7 km) southeast of Tulare

Operated by: Rankin Aeronauticial Academy, Inc.
Now: Agricultural use
Known sub-bases and auxiliaries

Hunter Auxiliary Field
Tipton Auxiliary Field
Strathmore Auxiliary Field
Tulare Airport
Trauger Auxiliary Field

- Ryan Field, 3 miles (4.8 km) southwest of Hemet

Operated by: Ryan School of Aeronautics
Now: Hemet-Ryan Airport (FAA LID: HMT)
Known sub-bases and auxiliaries

Banning Auxiliary Field
Highland Auxiliary Field
Ryan Auxiliary Field#1
Ryan Auxiliary Field#2
Ryan Auxiliary Field#3
Valle Vista Auxiliary Field
Gibbs Auxiliary Field

- Sequoia Field, 8 miles (13 km) north of Visalia

(FAA LID: D86)
Operated by: Visalia-Dinuba School of Aeronautics
Known sub-bases and auxiliaries

Three Rivers Auxiliary Field

- Ventura County Army Airfield, 2 miles (3.2 km) west of Oxnard

Operated by: Mira Loma Flight Academy
Also used by United States Navy as a NAAS to NAS San Diego
Now: Oxnard Airport,(IATA: OXR, ICAO: KOXR, FAA LID: OXR)

- War Eagle Field, 5 miles (8.0 km) west of Lancaster

Operated by: Polaris Flight Academy
Now: Detention Facility
Known sub-bases and auxiliaries

Liberty Auxiliary Field
Victory Field Auxiliary Field

=== Air Transport Command ===
Airfields were used for transport of personnel, supplies and equipment. Also for ferrying replacement aircraft to overseas units (Primarily Pacific Theater and Alaska).

- Fairfield-Suisun Army Airfield, 5 miles (8.0 km) southeast of Fairfield.

Station #10, Air Transport Command, Pacific Wing
1504th Army Air Forces Base Unit
Now: Travis Air Force Base (IATA: SUU, ICAO: KSUU, FAA LID: SUU)

- Oakland Municipal Airport, 6 miles (9.7 km) northeast of Oakland

20th Ferrying Group
507th Army Air Force Base Unit
Now: Oakland International Airport (IATA: OAK, ICAO: KOAK)

- Reno Army Air Base Auxiliary Flight Strip, 64 miles (103 km) north of Truckee.Oa

Emergency landing field for Reno Army Air Base, Nevada (ATC)
Later: Amedee Army Airfield (IATA: AHC, ICAO: KAHC, FAA LID: AHC)

- Palm Springs Army Airfield, 3 miles (4.8 km) east of Palm Springs.

21st Ferrying Group
459th Army Air Force Base Unit
Also used by the United States Navy (Ferrying Service)
Now: Palm Springs International Airport (IATA: PSP, ICAO: KPSP, FAA LID: PSP)

- San Francisco Municipal Airport, 11 miles (18 km) southeast of San Francisco

Port of Embarkation
San Francisco Fighter Wing (4th Air Force)
Now: San Francisco International Airport (IATA: SFO, ICAO: KSFO)
Also: Coast Guard Air Station San Francisco

=== Technical Service Command ===
Provided aircraft modification prior to overseas deployment and also depot-level repair and maintenance services. Technical Service Command also operated acceptance centers for newly manufactured aircraft in Southern California, then ATC Ferrying Command transferred the new aircraft to various airfields or modification centers prior to deployment to operational units.

- McClellan Army Airfield, 9 miles (14 km) northeast of Sacramento

4895th Army Air Force Base Unit
Sacramento Air Depot
Was: McClellan Air Force Base (1947–2001)
Now: McClellan Airfield (IATA: MCC, ICAO: KMCC, FAA LID: MCC)
Also: Coast Guard Air Station Sacramento

Winter-Davis Flight Strip
Redding Army Airfield

- San Bernardino Army Airfield, 2 miles (3.2 km) southeast of San Bernardino

499th Army Air Force Base Unit
San Bernardino Air Depot
Was: Norton Air Force Base (1947–1994)
Now: San Bernardino International Airport (IATA: SBD, ICAO: KSBD, FAA LID: SBD)
Known sub-bases and auxiliaries

Desert Center Army Airfield
Rice Army Airfield
Gibbs Auxiliary Field
Peik Auxiliary Field

- Clover Field (Santa Monica Municipal Airport), 2 miles (3.2 km) east of Santa Monica

Delivery airport for Douglas Aircraft (A-20, B-18, C-47)
Delivery airport for Vultee Aircraft (BT-13)
Now: Santa Monica Airport (IATA: SMO, ICAO: KSMO, FAA LID: SMO)

- Hawthorne Municipal Airport, 2 miles (3.2 km) east of Hawthorne

Joint Use: United States Navy
Delivery airport for Northrop Aircraft (P-61)
Also used by Technical Training Command
Now: Jack Northrop Field/Hawthorne Municipal Airport (IATA: HHR, ICAO: KHHR)

- Lindbergh Field (San Diego Municipal Airport), 3 miles (4.8 km) north of San Diego.

Delivery airport for Consolidated Aircraft (PBY, B-24)
Now: San Diego International Airport (IATA: SAN, ICAO: KSAN, FAA LID: SAN)
Also: Coast Guard Air Station San Diego
Known sub-bases and auxiliaries

Gibbs Auxiliary Field
Peik Auxiliary Field

- Lockheed Air Terminal, 3 miles (4.8 km) west-northwest of Burbank.

Delivery airport for Lockheed Aircraft (P-38, B-17, PV-2, C-69)
Also used by Technical Training Command
Now: Bob Hope Airport (IATA: BUR, ICAO: KBUR)

- Long Beach Army Airfield, 4 miles (6.4 km) northeast of Long Beach

6th Ferrying Group (Air Transport Command)
Delivery airport for Douglas Aircraft (B-17, A-26, C-47)
348th Army Air Force Base Unit
Now: Long Beach Airport (IATA: LGB, ICAO: KLGB, FAA LID: LGB)

- Lomita Flight Strip, 3 miles (4.8 km) southwest of Downtown Torrance

Now: Zamperini Field (IATA: TOA, ICAO: KTOA, FAA LID: TOA)

- Mines Field (Los Angeles Municipal Airport), 12 miles (19 km) southwest of Los Angeles.

Delivery airport for North American Aviation (AT-6, P-51, B-25)
Delivery airport for Douglas Aircraft (SBD Dauntless)
Aerial Port of Embarkation (Air Transport Command)
Los Angeles Fighter Wing (4th Air Force)
Also used by Technical Training Command
Now: Los Angeles International Airport (IATA: LAX, ICAO: KLAX)
Also: Coast Guard Air Station Los Angeles

- Santa Monica Municipal Airport, Santa Monica, 2 miles (3.2 km) east of Santa Monica.

Delivery airfield for Douglas Aircraft (C-54)
Now: Santa Monica Municipal Airport (IATA: SMO, ICAO: KSMO)

== Known secondary facilities ==
- Furnace Creek Emergency Landing Field, 1 mile (1.6 km) west of Furnace Creek (Army and Navy use)
- San Jose Municipal Airport, 4 miles (6.4 km) northwest of San Jose (Civil Air Patrol)

== Desert Training Center ==
Desert Training Center's California Army Airfields built to support General Patton's many desert training camps. Patton's HQ was at Camp Young.

- Major airfields
  - Blythe Army Air Base
  - Desert Center Army Airfield
  - Thermal Army Airfield
  - Rice Army Airfield
  - Shavers Summit Army Airfield (now Chiriaco Summit Airport)
- Minor airfields
  - Camp Coxcomb Army Field (abandoned)
  - Camp Essex Army Field (abandoned)
  - Camp Goffs Army Field (abandoned)
  - Camp Ibis Army Field (abandoned)
  - Camp Iron Mountain Army Field

== See also ==
- Air Transport Command (World War II)
- California during World War II
- List of airports in the Los Angeles area
