= Q53 =

Q53 may refer to:

- Q53 (New York City bus), a New York City bus route
- An-Najm, the 53rd surah of the Quran
- Franklin Field (California), in Sacramento County, California, United States
- French submarine Germinal
