= Merced Army Airfield auxiliary fields =

US WWII airfield

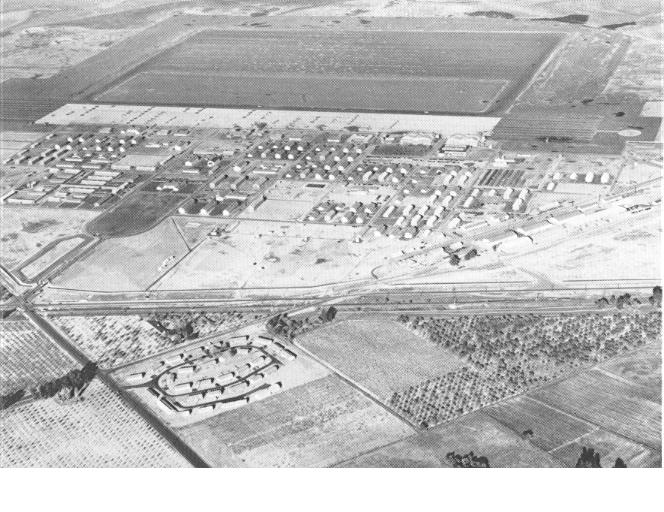
Merced Army Airfield, November 1942

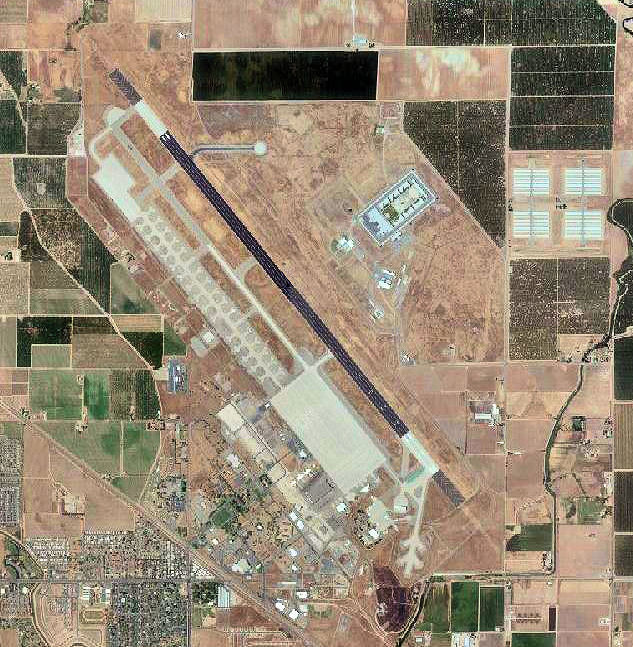
Castle Airport in 2006, former Merced Army Air Field

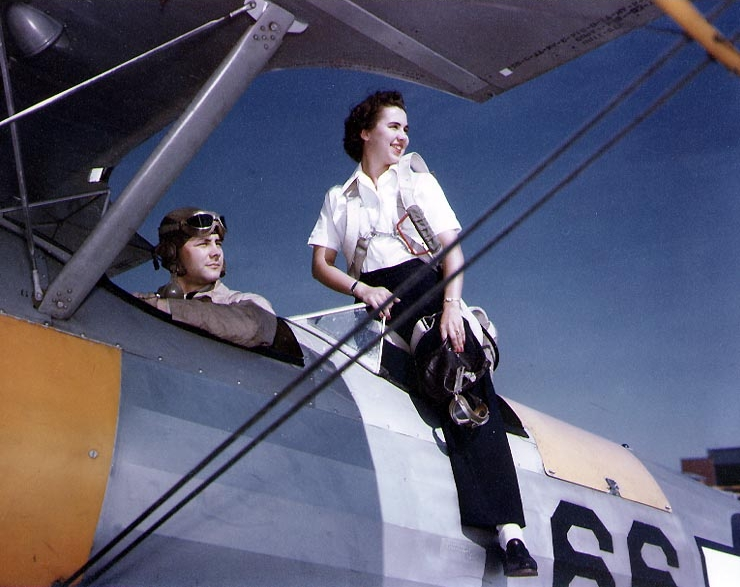
A WAVE in a Boeing-Stearman Model 75

Merced Army Air Field auxiliary fields were built to support pilot training at the Merced Army Air Field. In 1940 the US Army wanted to build near Merced, California a 30,000 per year basic pilot training base. The former city of Cuba, Merced County, California near the Atchison, Topeka and Santa Fe Railway rail line was chosen at 37°22′50″N 120°34′05″W at an elevation of 181 feet (55 m) for the main base, in Atwater, California. United States Army Air Corps leased the land from the City of Merced on 16 June 1941. Building the airbase school started on 8 July 1941 and opened on 20 September 1941 as a sub-base of Army Air Forces Western Flying Training Command at Moffett Field. First called Air Corps Basic Flying School, Merced. The US Army moved part of the: 98th Bombardment Group, 539th School Squadrons, 540th School Squadrons, 541st School Squadrons, the 90th Air Base Squadron, and the 340th Material Squadron at Moffett Field to the new base in November 1941. The Air Corps Basic Flying School was renamed the Merced Army Flying School on 7 April 1942. To support the training auxiliary fields near the Merced Army Flying School were to be built for the flight training program. Merced Army Flying School was renamed the Merced Army Air Field in May 1943 and became part of the Western Flying Training Command.

== Merced Army Air Field ==
The Merced Army Air Field runway was long enough and strengthened to handle training for Boeing B-29 Superfortress in 1944. At its peak, 539 planes were based at Merced Army Air Field and its auxiliary fields. In April 1944 the 3026th Army Air Forces Base Unit (Pilot School Basic) was given command of the Merced flight school. Some of the pilots and crews that were trained at the Merced Army Airfield during the war were from the Women's Air Service Pilots (WASPs). The Fourth Air Force took command of the Merced Army Air Field on 1 July 1945. On 17 January 1946 the Merced Army Air Field was renamed Castle Field, after Brigadier General Frederick W. Castle, who on 24 December 1944, continued flying his B-17 Flying Fortress so his crew could bail out, he was killed when the aircraft exploded. Castle Air Force Base was closed in 1995. The Merced County Fairgrounds was also used for training.

The most common planes to land and take off at Merced Army Airfield auxiliary fields were the Vultee BT-13 Valiant and BT-15 Valiant. Cadets trained for 8 hours a day at the Auxiliary Fields. Flight instructors also were the air traffic controllers from their planes. The other planes used at the fields were Boeing-Stearman Model 75 (called Kaydet) and North American T-6 Texan.

- Merced Army Air Field auxiliary fields were :

== Merced Auxiliary Field ==
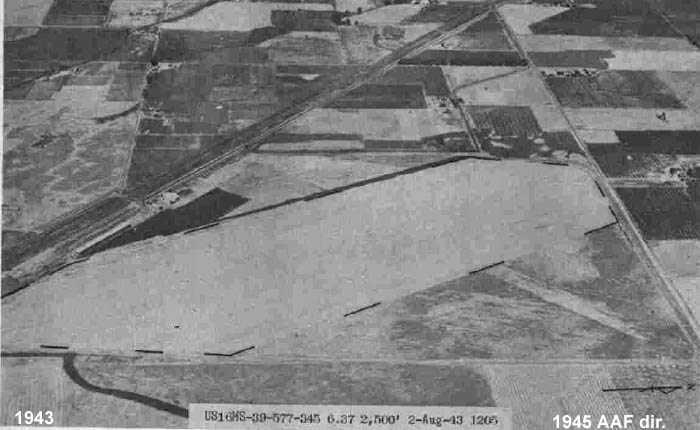
Merced Auxiliary Field No. 1

Merced Auxiliary Field No. 1 or Merced Municipal Airport Auxiliary Field was a sub base to support training at the Merced Army Airfield. Merced Auxiliary Field No. 1 was the 1932 Merced Municipal Airport located at 37°20′01″N 120°30′30″W. The 66-acres Airport was located off California State Route 99 near the Santa Fe Railroad tracks, three miles northwest of the city of Merced, California. The city airport was dedicated on 3 April 1932 and operated by George Voight until 1936 when the city took over operation. Works Project Administration improved the site in the later 1930s. After the attack on Pearl Harbor on 7 December 1941, the US War Department leased the Airport to the US Army in 1942. The Merced Auxiliary Field was the main training headquarters while the Merced Army Airfield was being built. Temporary tents were put up for cadets and staff lived in the hangars and local hotels. The Merced Army Airfield was completed on 20 September 1941 and operations move to the new airbase. Merced Auxiliary Field was then used for landing and take off training, also as an emergency landing strip. After the war on 23 August 1945 the Merced Municipal Airport Auxiliary Field No. 1 was returned to the City of Merced. With the completion of the New Merced Regional Airport, the Merced Auxiliary Field was closed. The current site of the Merced Auxiliary Field now farmland and housing.

== Ballico Auxiliary Field ==
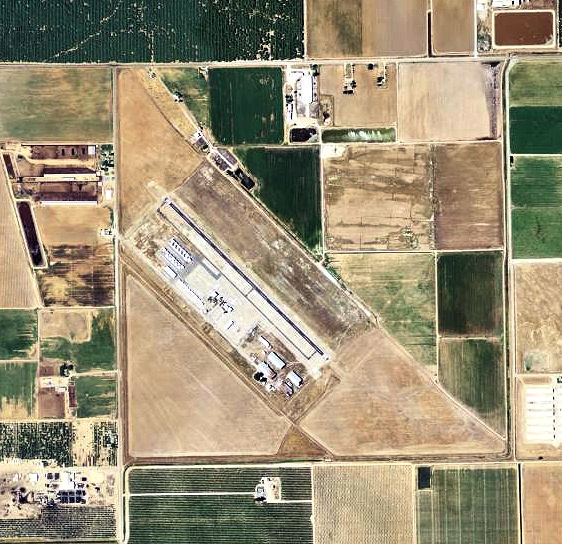
Turlock Municipal Airport in 2006, former Ballico Auxiliary Field

Ballico Auxiliary Field No. 2 was a 621.76-acre sub base of the Merced Army Flying School at the Merced Army Air Field. Ballico Auxiliary Field was a grain farm field in Turlock, California. With the outbreak of World War 2, in October 1942 the US Army built the Ballico Auxiliary Field for landing and off-site training, also as emergency landing field, for the Basic Flying School at Merced Army Air Field. The land was leased from Charles C. Newport, for 5 years. The Army built a 3,000-foot by 2,800-foot paved runways is a rectangle shape. Some support buildings were built: stagehouse, crash truck shelter, a control tower, a storehouse, latrines, and sheds. Based at the Ballico Auxiliary Field were troops from the 90th Air Base Squadron. In 1944 Air Field control was taken over by the 3026th Army Air Forces Base Unit for the Basic Pilot School. On 1 July 1945 Ballico Auxiliary Field and the other support fields were turned over to the US Army's Fourth Air Force. After the war the base as closed, on 10 November 1946. The land was given to the City of Turlock on 19 November 1946 to open a municipal airport. The city took over operation on 31 July 1947 and named the base the Turlock Municipal Airport. Parts of the vast base were sold off or leased to: Oliver Chance for agricultural, Golden By-Products for drying almond hulls, and the Ballico Resource Conservation District.

== Howard Auxiliary Field ==
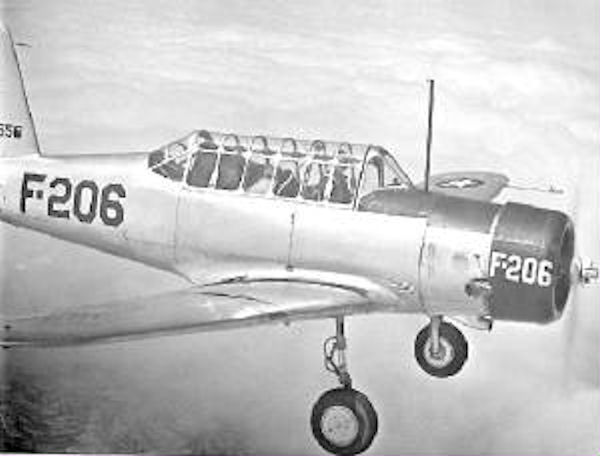
Vultee BT-13 Valiant in California, an Army training plane

Howard Auxiliary Field No. 3 was located in Stevinson, California at 37°19′33″N 120°48′07″W. The War Department leased 480-acre of land from two owners in 1941. For training pilots a 3,000 by 3,000 landing mat was built at the site, there were no support buildings built. Due to poor water drainage, Howard Auxiliary Field was closed on 15 April 1944 and both leases canceled by 4 September 1944. The land was returned farmland and no trace of Howard Auxiliary Field remains.

== Athlone Auxiliary Field ==
Athlone Auxiliary Field No. 4 was southeast of the city of Athlone, California at 37°11′37″N 120°21′41″W. Athlone started as a railroad station in 1870s on the Southern Pacific line. Athlone was ideal for an airfield, it was level agricultural land, outside of Merced, which flooded sometimes. The site was near a railroad station and just west of US Highway 99, and near a power lines. The War Department leased 235 acres on 3 January 1942 from Fred B. Fancher. The Army built a paved 3,000 by 3,000-foot landing mat runway on the land. Merced Army Flying School used Athlone Auxiliary Field for training of pilots. Athlone Auxiliary Field was closed in August 1945 and lease ended on 30 November 1945. The site is now farmland and no trace of the airfield remains.

== Potter Auxiliary Field ==
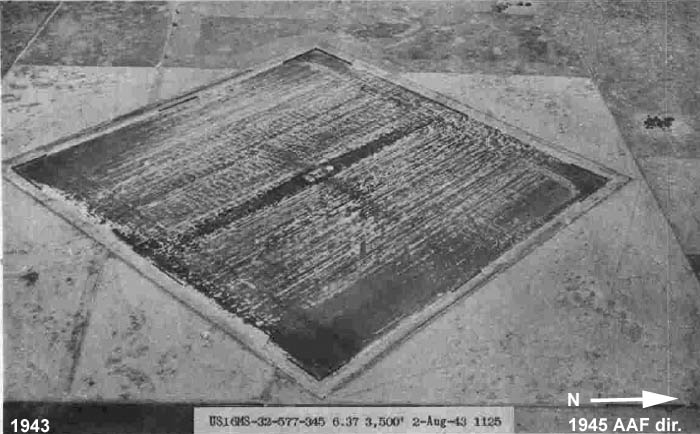
Potter Auxiliary Field in 1945, 3,000-foot square landing mat runway

Potter Auxiliary Field No. 5 was in El Nido, Merced County, California at 37°08′17″N 120°31′59″W. Potter Auxiliary Field was 18 miles southwest of the city of Merced, California. The US Army leased 640 acres of land in 1943 to build the Potter Auxiliary Field for flight training for cadets from Merced Army Air Field. The Army built a 3,000 by 3,000-foot landing mat, a stagehouse, crash truck shelter and latrines at the site. In late 1944 the surrounding land of 400 acres was sub leased for farmland. The Army ended its lease on all land on 31 May 1947. The land was returned to farmland and ranching, no trace of the airfield remains.

== Merced New Municipal Airport Auxiliary Field ==
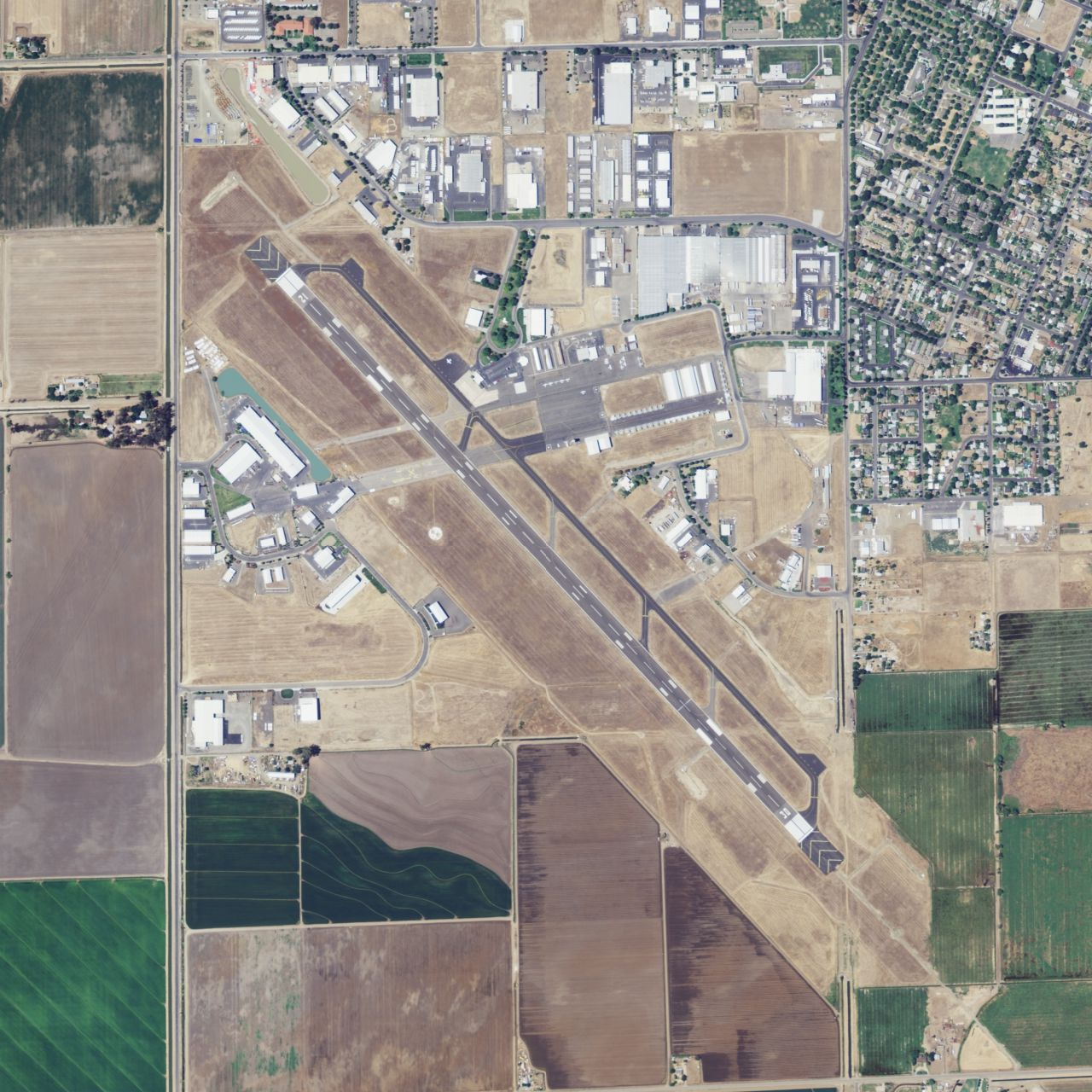
Merced Regional Airport in 2009, former Merced Airport Auxiliary Field

Merced New Municipal Airport Auxiliary Field No. 6 is now the Merced Regional Airport at 37°17′12″N 120°30′58″W at Grogan Road and West Avenue in the city of Merced. The land for the airport was acquired by City of Merced in 1940 from delinquent taxes. The city received a 1940 Works Progress Administration project to graded, level and installed drainage for a new airport. The Civil Aeronautics Authority (CAA) also provide support for the new project. Merced Army Flying School on 7 April 1942 was authorized to build auxiliary airfields to support the training of pilots at the site. The New Merced Municipal Airport was leased to the Army to support the training program. Thus the Corps of Engineers and CAA took over to complete the airfield. The Army built two 4,000' runways in a X shape and threshold lights. Completed in February 1942 the new airport was called New Merced Municipal Airport and served as an Airport Auxiliary Field. After the war, on 6 December 1948, the airport was returned to the City of Merced. Parts of the airport were used later by US Army helicopters, US Air Force and Navy aircraft to refuel aircraft in the years following. One of the original Army runways was extended to 5,904 feet for jet travel and the other runway was closed in 1967.

== Mariposa Auxiliary Field ==
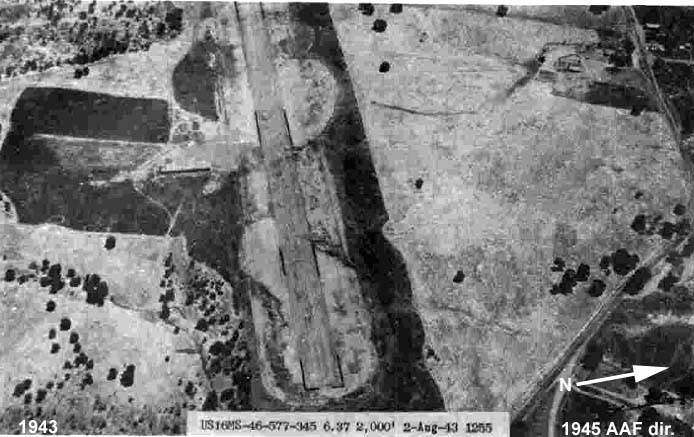
Mariposa Auxiliary Field in 1943

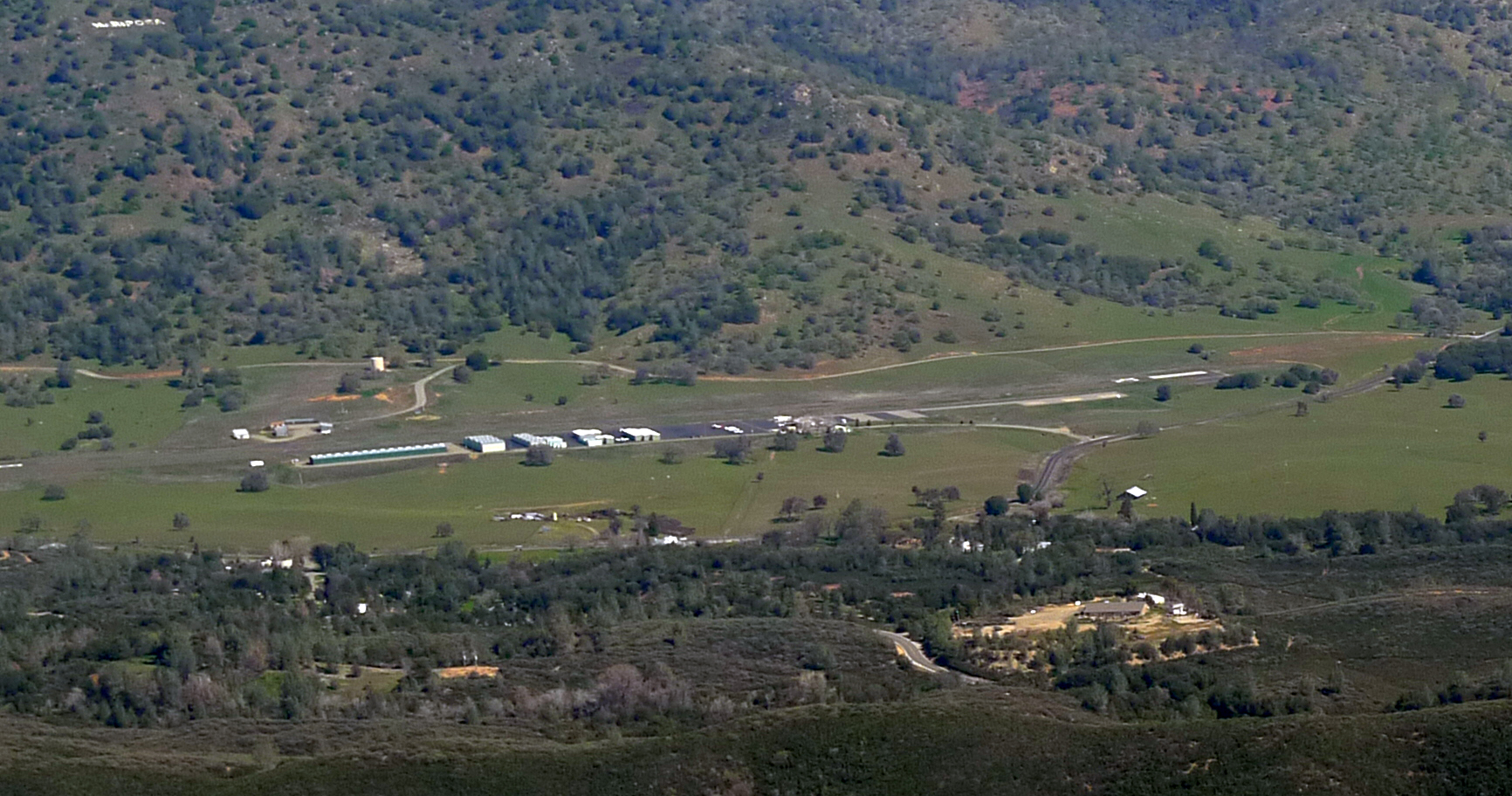
Mariposa Yosemite Airport in 2015, former Mariposa Auxiliary Field

Mariposa Auxiliary Field was an 62.194 acre auxiliary airfield of the Merced Army Air Field used for World War 2 pilot training. Mariposa Auxiliary Field was located four miles northwest of the city of Mariposa, in Mariposa County, California at 37°30′40″N 120°02′21″W at an elevation of 2,254 feet. After the war the airfield became the current Mariposa-Yosemite Airport. The War Department leased the 1937 Mariposa County Airport on 60.442 acres of valley land from the County of Mariposa in 1942. To enlarge the base 0.364 acres were leased from John Marre and an additional 1.388 leased from Richard Morrissey. The Army built a radio beacon nearby on Mount Bullion owned by the Bureau of Land Management in the 1940s. For training the Army used the existing: 3,306 foot runway, hangar, gasoline fueling equipment, lighting, and cabin. The airfield also served as an emergency landing field. At an elevation of 2,254 feet the airfield was above the common San Joaquin Valley fog layer, making at a good training and emergency landings. Pilots used the airfield for takeoff and landing training. In 1945 the lease was ended and land returned to it owners. The airfield has also been called the Mount Bullion Airport, the Mariposa County Airport and it current name Mariposa Yosemite Airport.

== See also ==
- California during World War II
- California World War II Army Airfields
- Air Transport Command (World War II)
- Minter Army Airfield auxiliary fields
- Gardner Army Airfield auxiliary fields
