= Eagle Field =

Eagle Field may refer to:

- Eagle Field (airport), an airport in Dos Palos, California, United States
- Eagle Field (stadium), a stadium at Winthrop University in Rock Hill, South Carolina, United States
- Eagle Field (Georgia Southern), a soccer-specific stadium at Georgia Southern University in Statesboro, Georgia, United States
- Eagle Field at GS Softball Complex, a softball stadium at Georgia Southern University in Statesboro, Georgia, United States
