= KMCE =

KMCE may refer to:

- Merced Regional Airport (ICAO code KMCE)
- KBIT-LD (Monterey), a television station (channel 24, virtual 43) licensed to serve Monterey, California, United States, which held the call signs KMCE-LP or KMCE-LD from 2002 to 2022
