= Hancock Field =

Hancock Field may refer to:

- Hancock Field (California), a former (1927–1959) airport and military airfield located near Santa Maria, California, United States
- Santa Maria Public Airport (Capt. G. Allan Hancock Field), located near Santa Maria, California, United States
- Syracuse Hancock International Airport (named for Clarence E. Hancock), located near Syracuse, New York, United States
- Hancock Field Air National Guard Base, Syracuse, New York
- Hancock Stadium, a multi-purpose stadium at Illinois State University
