= KLHM =

KLHM may refer to:

- KLHM-LP, a defunct low-power radio station (100.7 FM) formerly licensed to St. Joseph, Missouri, United States
- the ICAO code for Lincoln Regional Airport (California)
- a Pirate Radio station in Minneapolis, Minnesota in the 1960s.
