= Hemet-Ryan Airport =

Airport in Egan, CA

Hemet-Ryan Airport Ryan Field
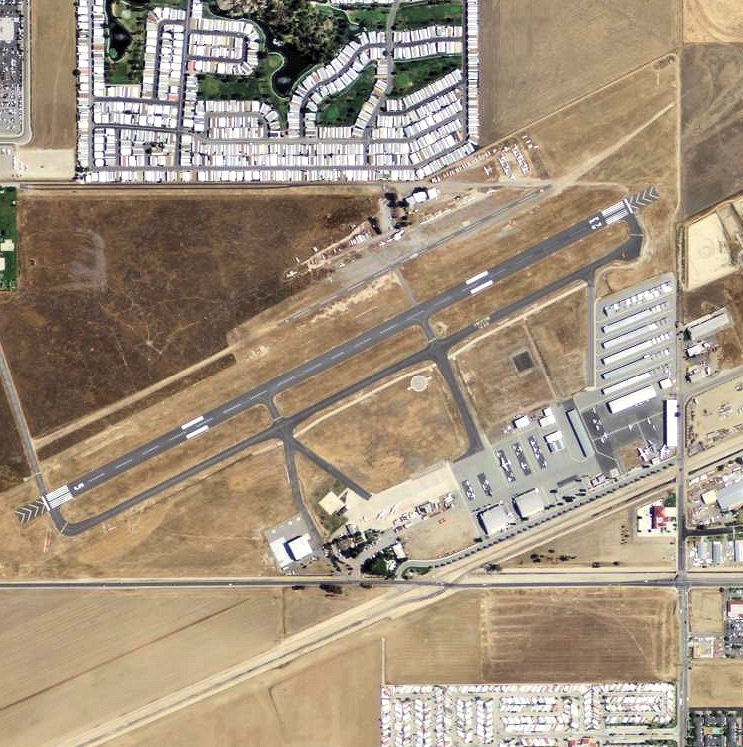
- 2006 USGS photo
- IATA: HMT; ICAO: KHMT; FAA LID: HMT

Summary
- Airport type: Public
- Owner: County of Riverside
- Operator: County of Riverside
- Serves: Hemet, California
- Elevation AMSL: 1,512 ft (461 m)
- Coordinates: 33°44′02″N 117°01′21″W
- Website: rchmtra.com

Map
- Location within California

Runways
Direction	Length		Surface
Direction	ft	m	Surface
5/23	4,314	1,315	Asphalt
4/22	2,045	623	Asphalt

Statistics (2008)
- Aircraft operations: 75,444
- Based aircraft: 236
- Source: Federal Aviation Administration

Hemet-Ryan Field 1943 USAAF Classbook

Hemet-Ryan Airport (IATA: HMT, ICAO: KHMT, FAA LID: HMT) is an airport near Egan (located in what is now Hemet), CA.

Hemet-Ryan is a main Cal Fire Air Attack Base, also used for civil purposes, Civil Air Patrol meetings, and more. It is home to a Riverside County Sheriff's Office aviation unit and a Mercy Air air ambulance. The airport is named after the late T. Claude Ryan.

== History ==
The airfield opened in September 1940 for the United States Army Air Corps. It was assigned to the West Coast Training Center (later Western Flying Training Command) as a primary (level 1) pilot training airfield. Later it was activated as an Air Corps Training Detachment with Ryan School of Aeronautics conducting primary flight training under control of 5th Flying Training Detachment. Known sub-bases and auxiliaries were:

- Banning Auxiliary Field (Unknown location)
- Highland Auxiliary Field (Unknown location)
- Ryan Auxiliary Field #1 33°47′26″N 117°00′58″W
- Ryan Auxiliary Field #2 33°44′49″N 117°13′10″W
- Ryan Auxiliary Field #3 33°48′10″N 117°11′05″W
- Valle Vista Auxiliary Field 33°45′35″N 116°53′30″W
- Gibbs Auxiliary Field 32°48′56″N 117°08′22″W

Flight training was performed with PT-17 Stearmans as the primary trainer, along with Ryan PT-21 Recruits. Over 14,000 army cadets were trained to fly. New Ryan PT-25s were delivered to the field by WAFS in July 1943.

The airport was inactivated in December 1944 with the drawdown of AAFTC's pilot training program, the airfield was declared surplus and turned over to the Army Corps of Engineers. Later, the airfield was discharged to the War Assets Administration. The facility eventually became a public airport owned and operated by Riverside County.

For over 50 years (about 1959–2009), Hemet-Ryan was a popular site for operating sailplanes (gliders). Sailplane Enterprises, a commercial glider flight school, operated there from 1969 to 2009. The Cypress Soaring club was based there from 1969 to 2009. Orange County Soaring Association (OCSA) also used Hemet-Ryan as its home base from 1991 to 2009. On September 30, 2009, the Riverside County Economic Development Agency closed Hemet-Ryan to glider operations. OCSA filed a complaint with the FAA pursuant to Title 14 CFR Part 16 against the County of Riverside. On February 11, 2011, the FAA ruled that the closure was in violation of Federal law and Federal grant obligations. The County declined to appeal the ruling. On November 18, 2016, the Cypress Soaring Club returned to Hemet-Ryan and resumed sailplane operations on runway 4-22. As of November 2019, Cypress Soaring has seven sailplanes and a Cessna 182, used for aerotowing, based at Hemet-Ryan Airport.

On August 6, 2023, during the 2023 California wildfire season, two firefighting helicopters crashed into each other in Cabazon, California, having taken off from Hemet-Ryan Airport about fifteen minutes earlier.

== Ryan Air Attack ==
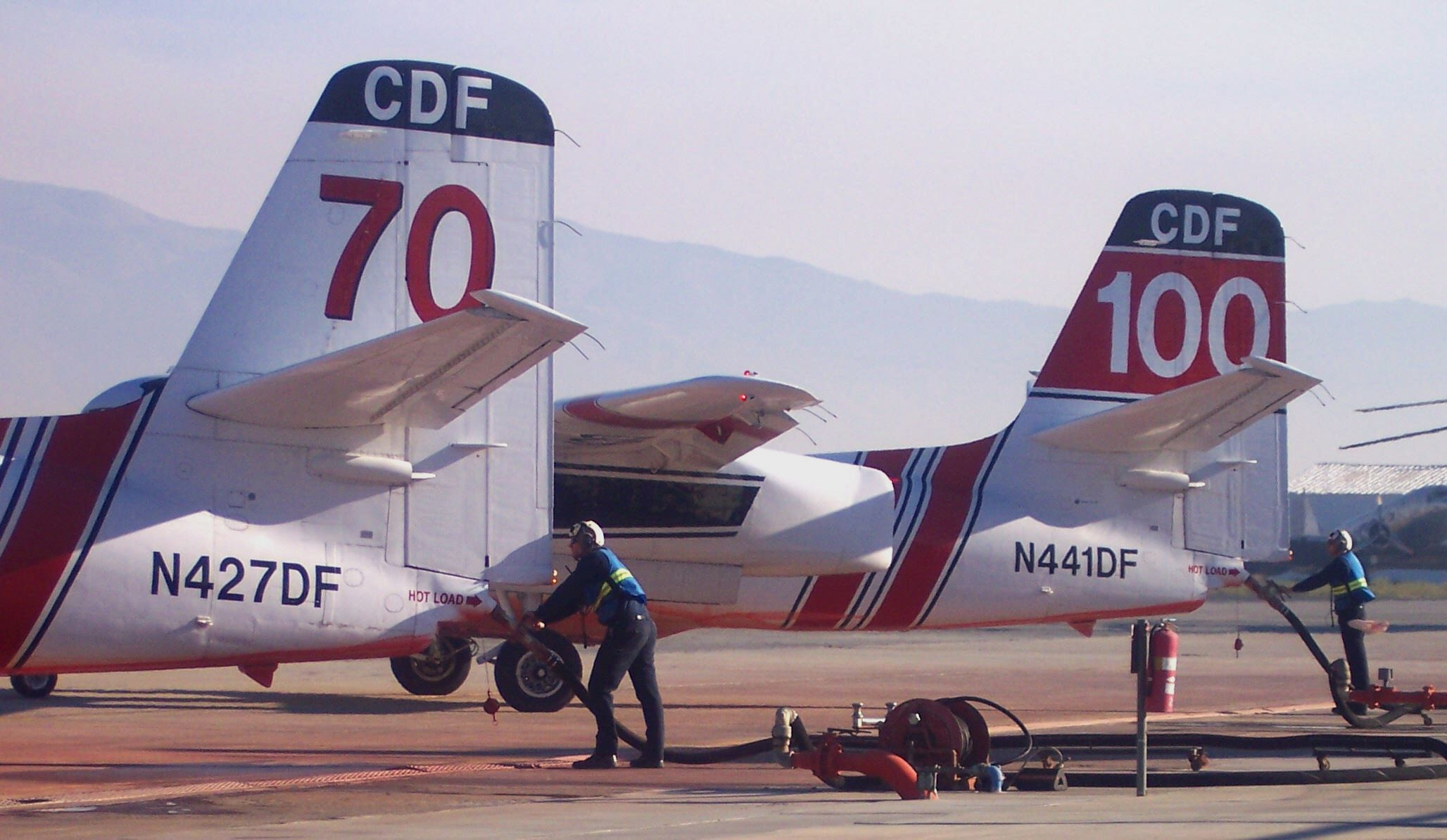
S-2 Tankers reloading at Hemet-Ryan during the Esperanza Fire

Ryan Air Attack is a joint Air Attack / Helitack base operated by the California Department of Forestry and Fire Protection (Riverside Unit). It is one of 19 tanker bases strategically located throughout California. The base provides initial attack aircraft service to over 17,000 square miles (44,000 km^{2}) of private, state, and federally owned lands. Up until 1998, Ryan was statistically the busiest air tanker base in the United States, delivering an average of 1.5 million gallons of retardant annually. Currently two S-2 Trackers, an OV-10 and a S-70i are stationed at the base. The base has served as the primary air attack base for many wildfires, including the Old Fire and Cedar Fire in 2003 and the Esperanza Fire in 2006.

=== History of Ryan Air Attack ===
The United States Forest Service commenced air tanker loading operations in 1957, and in 1959 California Division of Forestry (now Cal Fire) began their operation at Ryan field. Both agencies maintained separate parking, loading and mixing areas but the initial stages of a joint base operation had begun. In 1969, the United States Forest Service (USFS) and the California Division of Forestry (CDF) truly merged into a joint agency air attack base sharing the base operation, responsibilities and facilities. The joint base concept successfully continued operation until 1998 when the USFS moved their air tanker base operations to the larger and recently vacated Norton Air Force Base.

From the beginning of Ryan Air Attack Base, Cal Fire and the USFS used privately owned contracted World War II vintage aircraft. The type and sizes of aircraft varied based on vendor, availability of flyable airframes and spare parts. As the years counted off and the flight hours increased these airplanes became static museum displays or were robbed for parts to keep the dwindling fleet flying. Because of the dwindling air tanker fleet, Cal Fire acquired excess U.S. Navy Grumman S-2A submarine hunting aircraft. These planes were converted from military use to firefighting aircraft using a design developed by Hemet Valley Flying Service. The first two aircraft build-ups were completed by Hemet Valley Flying Service and tested at Ryan Air Attack Base. The basic aircraft design has been in continuous state service since 1975.

In 1977 Cal Fire began a two-week pilot helitack program using a contracted helicopter. Headed up by Captain Emil Derdowski and two firefighters, the program was eventually extended to a total of four weeks. The success of this pilot program brought on line the Hemet-Ryan Helitack Base using a full-time contract helicopter staffed with three captains and nine firefighters operating out of Ryan Air Attack Base.

In 1992 Cal Fire acquired several larger Bell UH-1H helicopters with Hemet-Ryan Helitack receiving one of the first buildups. A year later, the OV-10 replaced the Cessna 337 as Air Attack 310 based at Ryan. In June 2001, Cal Fire replaced the older S-2As at Ryan with Tanker 72 and 73. The new tankers are S-2F3AT Turbine Tanker conversions with upgrades including constant flow 1200 gallon tanks and turbine engines allowing for better capabilities and performance.

=== Future of Ryan Air Attack ===
In June 2007 The Hemet-Ryan Airport was approved $2.5 million from the Riverside County Board of Supervisors and over $25 million from the state for the redevelopment of the air-attack facilities. The upgrades would include extending the runway from 4,300 feet (1,300 m) to 6,000 feet (1,800 m) to accommodate heavier firefighting aircraft such as the MAFFS C-130. The runway expansion would take place on the southwest portion of the complex and require re-alignment of bordering Stetson Avenue and Warren Road. The new base would also include a 5,842-square-foot (542.7 m^{2}), 22-bed barracks building, a 4,812-square-foot (447.0 m^{2}) three-bay vehicle storage facility and shop; a 4,646-square-foot (431.6 m^{2}), two-story operations building containing pilot facilities, administration and dispatch center; a 15,300-square-foot (1,420 m^{2}), two-bay open-shade canopy and an 8,211-square-foot (762.8 m^{2}) helicopter/ OV-10 enclosed hangar. Also planned are new public and secured staff parking areas, six fire-retardant loading pits to handle inter-agency aircraft, along with equipment tanks, pumps and piping used to mix and deliver fire retardant.

Because of critical need, the strategic location of the base and proven performance and handling of large wildfires, Cal Fire and the state consider the project top priority in the list of firefighting capital improvements.

Construction was to begin in 2008, but as of 2010, Cal Fire is still waiting for the promised state funds. Meanwhile, Cal Fire has been drawing plans and preparing to open the project to contractor bidding, and the Riverside County Economic Development Agency has agreed to manage the project.

== Facilities ==
Apart from hosting Cal Fire air attack operations, the Hemet-Ryan is also home to a Riverside County Sheriff's Office aviation unit. In August 2010 the airport became home to an emergency medical helicopter operated by Mercy Air. The airport also hosts a biennial air show with the next one being in 2011.

In 2008 the airport had 75,444 general aviation aircraft operations, average 206 per day. 236 aircraft were then based at the airport: 48% single-engine, 9% multi-engine, <1% jet, 4% helicopter, 36% glider and 2% ultralight. Air Hemet Piper Navajos flew to Los Angeles international Airport LAX in 1985.

== See also ==
- California World War II Army Airfields

== Other sources ==
- This article incorporates public domain material from the Air Force Historical Research Agency
- Manning, Thomas A. (2005), History of Air Education and Training Command, 1942–2002. Office of History and Research, Headquarters, AETC, Randolph AFB, Texas OCLC 71006954, 29991467
- Shaw, Frederick J. (2004), Locating Air Force Base Sites, History’s Legacy, Air Force History and Museums Program, United States Air Force, Washington DC. OCLC 57007862, 1050653629
