= W. R. Byron Airport =

Airport in Riverside County, California

W. R. Byron Airport (formerly Gary Field)
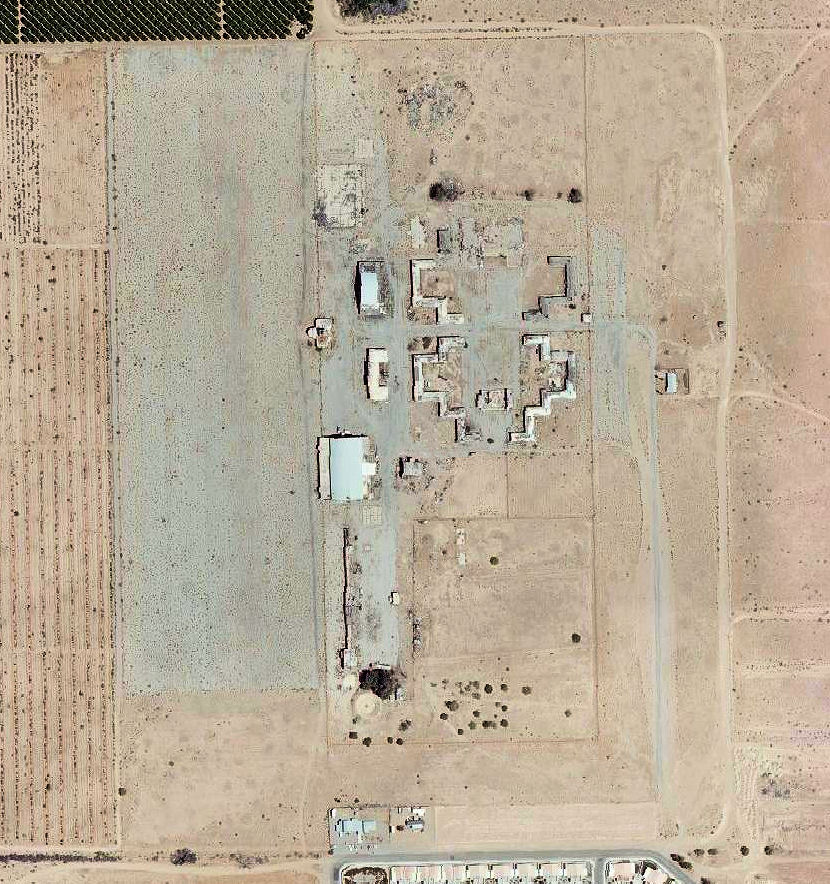
- USGS 2006 orthophoto
- IATA: none; ICAO: none; FAA LID: 44CA

Summary
- Airport type: Private use
- Owner: Willard R. Byron
- Serves: Blythe, California
- Elevation AMSL: 400 ft / 122 m
- Coordinates: 33°40′45″N 114°38′37″W

Map
- Location of airport in California

Runways
Direction	Length		Surface
Direction	ft	m	Surface
18/36	2,640	805	Asphalt
- Source: Federal Aviation Administration

W. R. Byron Airport (FAA LID: 44CA) is a privately owned, private use airport in Riverside County, California, United States. It is located four nautical miles (5 mi, 7 km) northwest of the central business district of Blythe, California, within the city limits.

== Facilities ==
W. R. Byron Airport has one runway designated 18/36 with an asphalt surface measuring 2,640 by 660 feet (805 x 201 m).

== History ==
The airfield opened on June 29, 1942. Known as Blythe Field and Gary Field, it began training United States Army Air Forces flying cadets under contract to Morton Air Academy. It was assigned to United States Army Air Forces West Coast Training Center (later Western Flying Training Command) as a primary (level 1) pilot training airfield. It had three 2,100' active hard-surfaced runways and three local auxiliary airfields for emergency and overflow landings. Flying training was performed with Ryan PT-22 as the primary trainer; it also had several PT-17 Stearmans assigned.

Known sub-bases and auxiliaries assigned to the field were:

- Ripley Auxiliary Field #1 (33°32′28″N 114°39′08″W)
- Ripley Auxiliary Field #2 (33°34′38″N 114°37′59″W)

It was inactivated on August 4, 1944, with the drawdown of AAFTC's pilot training program, then declared surplus and turned over to the Army Corps of Engineers on September 30, 1945. It was eventually discharged to the War Assets Administration (WAA), and the facilities of the former airport were reused by Palo Verde Community College. The college opened at the site on September 15, 1947, and at this point any aviation use of the airfield presumably ended.

Palo Verde College opened its doors as a junior college with an initial enrollment of seventeen students. By 1950, enrollment had reached 250. In September 1958, the college moved to East Hobsonway and closed its facilities at the former airport.

The site of Gary Field was reused as a private airfield beginning in 1981 as W. R. Byron Airport, and is a privately owned airfield.

Today, many buildings remain standing. In particular, the characteristic irregular arrangement of the barracks buildings which remains at the site make the location of Gary Field very much recognizable.

One of the large arch-roof hangars was destroyed by a fire on December 26, 2018. Before that, the second large hangar (at the northwest corner of the site) was apparently removed, but its foundation is still clearly recognizable.

An interesting sidebar to history puts billionaire Kirk Kerkorian at Morton Air Academy as a flight instructor during the early World War II period flying throughout the California desert; he made a first career flying charters, and later building hotels like the MGM Grand years later.

== See also ==
- California World War II Army Airfields
- 36th Flying Training Wing (World War II)
- Blythe Airport (33°37′09″N 114°43′01″W)
- Desert Center Airport (33°44′52″N 115°19′31″W)

== Other sources ==
- Manning, Thomas A. (2005), History of Air Education and Training Command, 1942–2002. Office of History and Research, Headquarters, AETC, Randolph AFB, Texas OCLC 71006954, 29991467
- Shaw, Frederick J. (2004), Locating Air Force Base Sites, History’s Legacy, Air Force History and Museums Program, United States Air Force, Washington DC. OCLC 57007862, 1050653629
- Gary Field at Abandoned & Little-Known Airfields
