= Needles Airport =

Airport in San Bernardino County, California, U.S.

Needles Airport Needles Army Airfield
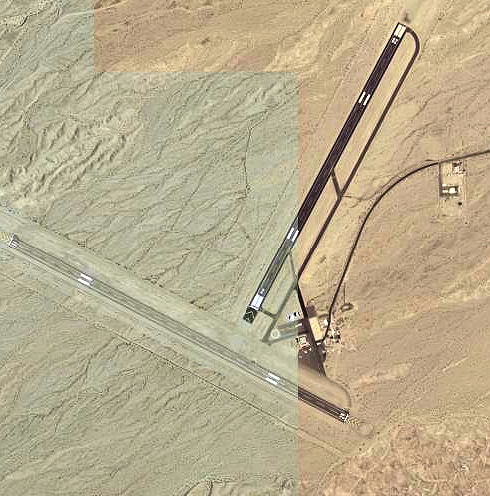
- 2006 USGS photo
- IATA: EED; ICAO: KEED; FAA LID: EED

Summary
- Airport type: Public
- Owner: County of San Bernardino
- Serves: Needles, California
- Elevation AMSL: 983 ft / 300 m
- Coordinates: 34°45′59″N 114°37′24″W

Map
- Location of Needles Airport

Runways
Direction	Length		Surface
Direction	ft	m	Surface
2/20	4,235	1,291	Asphalt
11/29	5,005	1,526	Asphalt

Statistics (2022)
- Aircraft operations (year ending 2/28/2022): 10,500
- Based aircraft: 4
- Source: Federal Aviation Administration

Needles Airport (IATA: EED, ICAO: KEED, FAA LID: EED) is a county-owned public airport in San Bernardino County, California, United States, in Needles, five miles (9 km) south of downtown.

It opened in May 1941. During World War II the airfield was known as Needles Army Airfield and was used by the United States Army Air Forces Fourth Air Force. With the end of the war the base returned to civil control.

== Facilities and aircraft ==
Needles Airport covers 796 acres (322 ha) at an elevation of 983 feet (300 m) above mean sea level. It has two asphalt runways: 2/20 is 4,235 by 100 feet (1,291 x 30 m) and 11/29 is 5,005 by 100 feet.

In the year ending February 28, 2022, the airport had 10,500 general aviation aircraft operations, an average of 29 per day. 4 aircraft were then based at this airport: 3 single-engine and 1 glider.

== See also ==
- California World War II Army Airfields
