= Yolo County Airport =

Airport in Yolo County, California, USA

Yolo County Airport Winters-Davis Flight Strip
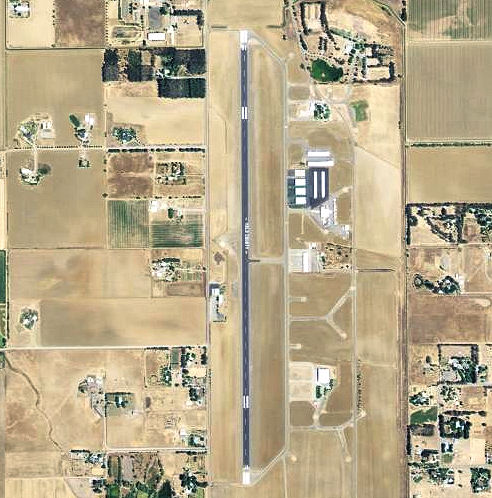
- 2006 USGS airphoto
- IATA: none; ICAO: KDWA; FAA LID: DWA

Summary
- Airport type: Public
- Owner: Yolo County
- Serves: Davis / Woodland / Winters, California
- Elevation AMSL: 100 ft / 30 m
- Coordinates: 38°34′46″N 121°51′25″W
- Website: www.yolocounty.org/...

Map
- Location

Runways
Direction	Length		Surface
Direction	ft	m	Surface
16/34	6,000	1,829	Asphalt

Statistics (2002)
- Aircraft operations: 60,360
- Based aircraft: 67
- Source: Federal Aviation Administration

Yolo County Airport (ICAO: KDWA, FAA LID: DWA, formerly 2Q3) is six miles northeast of Winters, five miles northwest of Davis and five miles southwest of Woodland, all in Yolo County, California. Magnetic variation is 16E.

Many U.S. airports use the same three-letter location identifier for the FAA and IATA, but this facility is DWA to the FAA and has no IATA code.

The airport is used for general aviation; many flights are recreational or farm-related, with few commercial flights. The airport has an active skydiving community and is home to SkyDance SkyDiving school. The airport is also home to the Yolo Sportsman Association. The YSA facility has pistol, shotgun, and rifle ranges as well as small fishable lakes. Solono Targetmasters conducts training and competitions for IDPA, and USPSA Practical shooters. The YSA clubhouse has a kitchen, vending machines, bathrooms, and a hall with seating for over 100 persons. Expect loud reports from shotguns during daylight hours.

This area is flat, floods, and is prone to fog in winter months. Expect winds from the west of 10-25kts starting 2 hours before sundown, lasting for several hours from June through September. These winds are known as "The Delta Breeze" and will result in temperatures dropping by up to 50 degrees before dying completely by morning. Dust and smoke picked up by these winds can reduce visibility dramatically at times.

== History ==
The airport was built by the United States Army Air Forces and the United States Army Corps of Engineers about 1942 with a 6000 by 150 foot (1830 by 45 meter) asphalt-concrete north–south runway, and was known as Winters-Davis Flight Strip. It was an emergency landing airfield for military aircraft on training flights and later used as an auxiliary training airfield for Mather Army Airfield, California. It was closed after World War II, and was turned over for local government use by the War Assets Administration (WAA).

== Facilities ==
Yolo County Airport covers 498 acres (202 ha) at an elevation of 100 feet (30 m). Its one runway, 16/34, is 6,000 by 100 feet (1,829 x 30 m) asphalt.

- Obstructions - Rwy 16; NONE
- Obstructions - Rwy 34: 110 ft (34 m). trees, 3,500 ft (1,100 m). from runway, 30:1 slope to clear
- REIL lights: NO
- VSI: 2-light PAPI on left (3.00 degrees glide path)
- Fuel 24 hours 100LL JET-A
- Parking: tiedowns
- Airframe service: MAJOR
- Powerplant service: MAJOR

In 2002 the airport had 60,360 aircraft operations, average 165 per day: 99% general aviation and 1% air taxi. 67 aircraft were then based at the airport: 85% single-engine, 10% multi-engine, 2% jet and 3% helicopter.

== Flood plain ==
The airport is built on what has been designated a flood plain, and flooding can be an issue especially during the winter months. In the early years of the airport's operations this was not as much of a problem, but as construction has taken place east of the field, natural drainage patterns have been disrupted and flooding has become more serious.

== See also ==
- California World War II Army Airfields
