= Mesa Del Rey Airport =

Airport in Monterey County, California

Mesa Del Rey Airport (former King City Airport)
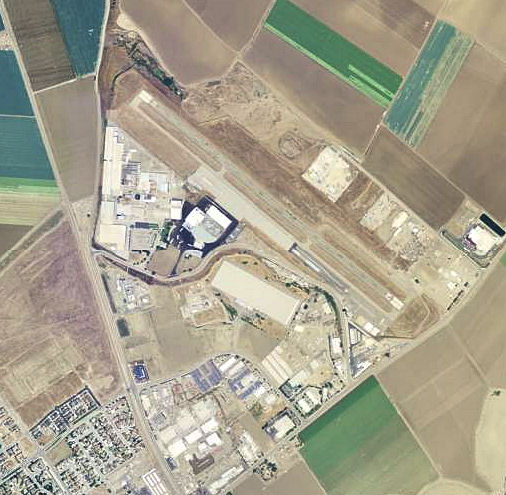
- USGS 2006 orthophoto
- IATA: KIC; ICAO: KKIC; FAA LID: KIC

Summary
- Airport type: Public
- Owner: City of King City
- Serves: King City, California
- Elevation AMSL: 374 ft / 114 m
- Coordinates: 36°13′43″N 121°07′17″W

Map

Runways
Direction	Length		Surface
Direction	ft	m	Surface
11/29	4,479	1,365	Asphalt

Statistics (2009)
- Aircraft operations: 7,862
- Based aircraft: 19
- Source: Federal Aviation Administration

Mesa Del Rey Airport (IATA: KIC, ICAO: KKIC, FAA LID: KIC) is a public airport a mile northeast of King City, in Monterey County, California, United States. The National Plan of Integrated Airport Systems for 2011–2015 categorized it as a general aviation facility.

== History ==
It opened in April 1940 as Palo Alto Airport or King City Airport. It originally had a 4,570' NW/SE hard surfaced runway. It was used for most of World War II by the United States Army Air Forces as a primary (level 1) contract pilot training airfield. It also had four local auxiliary airfields for emergency and overflow landings. The pilot training contractor was Palo Alto Airport, Inc. Flying training was performed with Fairchild PT-19s as the primary trainer. It also had several PT-17 Stearmans.

Known sub-bases and auxiliaries were (no trace of these fields remain today):

- Benard Auxiliary Field 36°08′39″N 121°05′35″W
- Hanson Auxiliary Field 36°20′14″N 121°14′58″W
- Sorenson Auxiliary Field 36°09′21″N 121°07′27″W
- Trescony Auxiliary Field 36°03′40″N 120°59′33″W

The construction of the flying school began in December 1940. The buildings, the barracks, administration, PX, mess hall, schoolrooms, aircraft hangars, runways, and aprons were built from scratch and were completed by May 1941. The first set of cadets arrived on March 15, and the first class of 50 started on March 21, 1941. Pilot training had ended by October 16, 1944.

Military control of the airport was transferred to the United States Navy in April 1945. It was known as King City Naval Auxiliary Air Station (NAAS). The Navy declared the airport surplus on 30 September 1945. Eventually it was discharged to the War Assets Administration (WAA) and became a civil airport.

== Facilities ==
The airport covers 149 acres (60 ha) at an elevation of 374 feet (114 m). Its single runway, 11/29, is 4,479 by 100 feet (1,365 x 30 m).

In the year ending February 25, 2009, the airport had 7,862 general aviation aircraft operations, average 21 per day. 19 aircraft were then based at this airport: 90% single-engine, 5% multi-engine, and 5% helicopter.

== See also ==
- California World War II Army Airfields
- 36th Flying Training Wing (World War II)
- List of airports in California
