= War Eagle Field =

Former US military airfield in Los Angeles County, California

- Part of Army Air Forces Training Command
- Lancaster, California
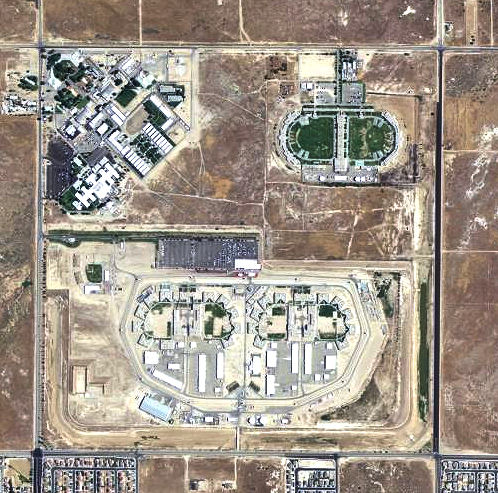
- 2006 USGS airphoto

Site information
- Type: Basic flying training airfield
- Owner: United States Army Air Forces
- Controlled by: USAAF West Coast Training Center
- Condition: Non-Aviation use

Location
- Coordinates: 34°41′48″N 118°13′38″W

Site history
- Built: 1941
- In use: 1941–1945
- Events: World War II

War Eagle Field is a former airfield located in the Mojave Desert, about 5 miles (8 km) west of Lancaster, California. It is currently used as a detention facility.

== History ==
Polaris Flight Academy, which opened on the field's grounds on July 15, 1941, trained cadets for the Royal Air Force and the Royal Canadian Air Force. (The school also used two auxiliary fields, Liberty Field and Victory Field.) The airfield had two hard-surfaced bituminous runways, one of 3,100' aligned NE/SW (05/23) the other of 2,950' aligned E/W (09/27).

After the Japanese attack of Pearl Harbor, the flight school began training cadets for the United States Army Air Forces on 28 July 1942, being operated by the Polaris Flight Academy as a contract basic flying school (phase 1). The primary trainer in use was the BT-13 Valiant. Known sub-bases and auxiliaries were:

- Liberty (Lancaster) Auxiliary Field (No. 1) 34°48′10″N 118°09′35″W
- Victory Field Auxiliary Field (No. 2) 34°46′48″N 118°16′12″W

In 1944, the flight school changed its name to Mira Loma Flight Academy. The airfield inactivated on 1 October 1945, and was declared surplus in 1946. Responsibility for it was given to the War Assets Administration.

== Current use ==
The land was bought by Los Angeles County. The airfield was converted to a detention facility, and it continues to be used for that purpose.

Many wartime buildings, including two still intact hangars, are still in use. On the roof of one of the hangars, the name "War Eagle" is still faintly perceptible. Flight operations continue at the airfield with a helicopter pad, used by the Los Angeles Sheriff's Department.

== Liberty Auxiliary Field ==
Liberty Auxiliary Field had two 3,900' hard-surface runways. One runway ran east/west and the other northeast/southwest. The runways were just north to of the city of Lancaster at an elevation of 2300 feet. In 1947 the airfield closed. United States Rubber Company built a 3,500 feet diameter circular automotive testing track around the two airfields is 1950. Tires from their Los Angeles factory were tested on the track, which later became Uniroyal. In the 1960s Dodge purchased the test track from Uniroyal and operated it for 10 years. A faint trace of the runways and track can still be seen from the air, just east of California State Route 14 and just south of West Ave B. A water treatment plant was built on the south runway in 2010.

== Victory Field Auxiliary ==
Victory Field Auxiliary had a four wide 3,900' hard-surface runways. The four runways were laid out in an unusual configuration, with two unconnected pairs of east/west and northeast/southwest strips. The runways could support bomber training. The runways were closed in 1945. A faint trace of the four runways can still be seen from the air, north of W Ave D and east of 80th Street W. Homes have been built on the far west of the four runways.

== See also ==
- California World War II Army Airfields
- 36th Flying Training Wing (World War II)
