= Sequoia Field Airport =

Airport in Tulare County, California

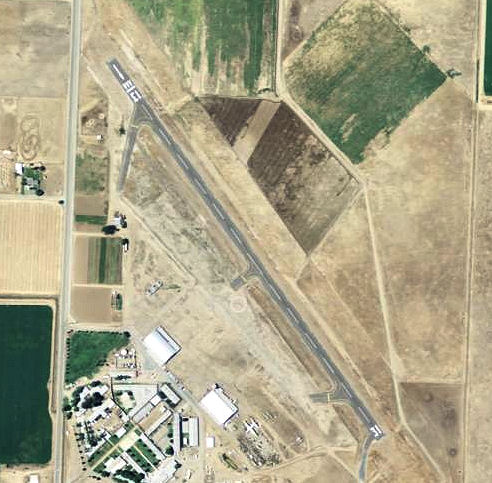
- 2006 USGS airphoto
- IATA: none; ICAO: none; FAA LID: D86

Summary
- Airport type: Public
- Owner: County of Tulare
- Serves: Visalia, California
- Elevation AMSL: 313 ft / 95 m
- Coordinates: 36°26′52″N 119°19′07″W

Map
- Location of Sequoia Field Airport

Runways
Direction	Length		Surface
Direction	ft	m	Surface
13/31	3,012	918	Asphalt

Statistics (2010)
- Aircraft operations: 12,000
- Based aircraft: 15
- Source: Federal Aviation Administration

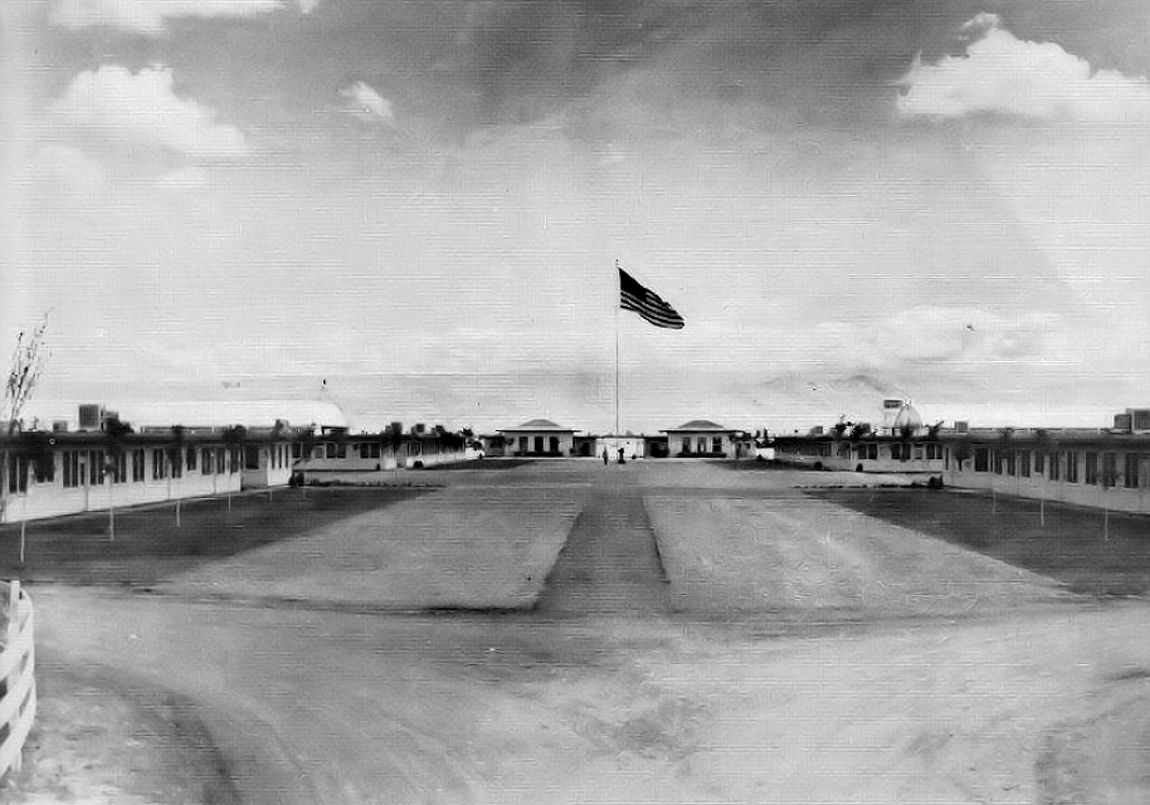
View of Sequoia Field Headquarters and main formation area, 1943

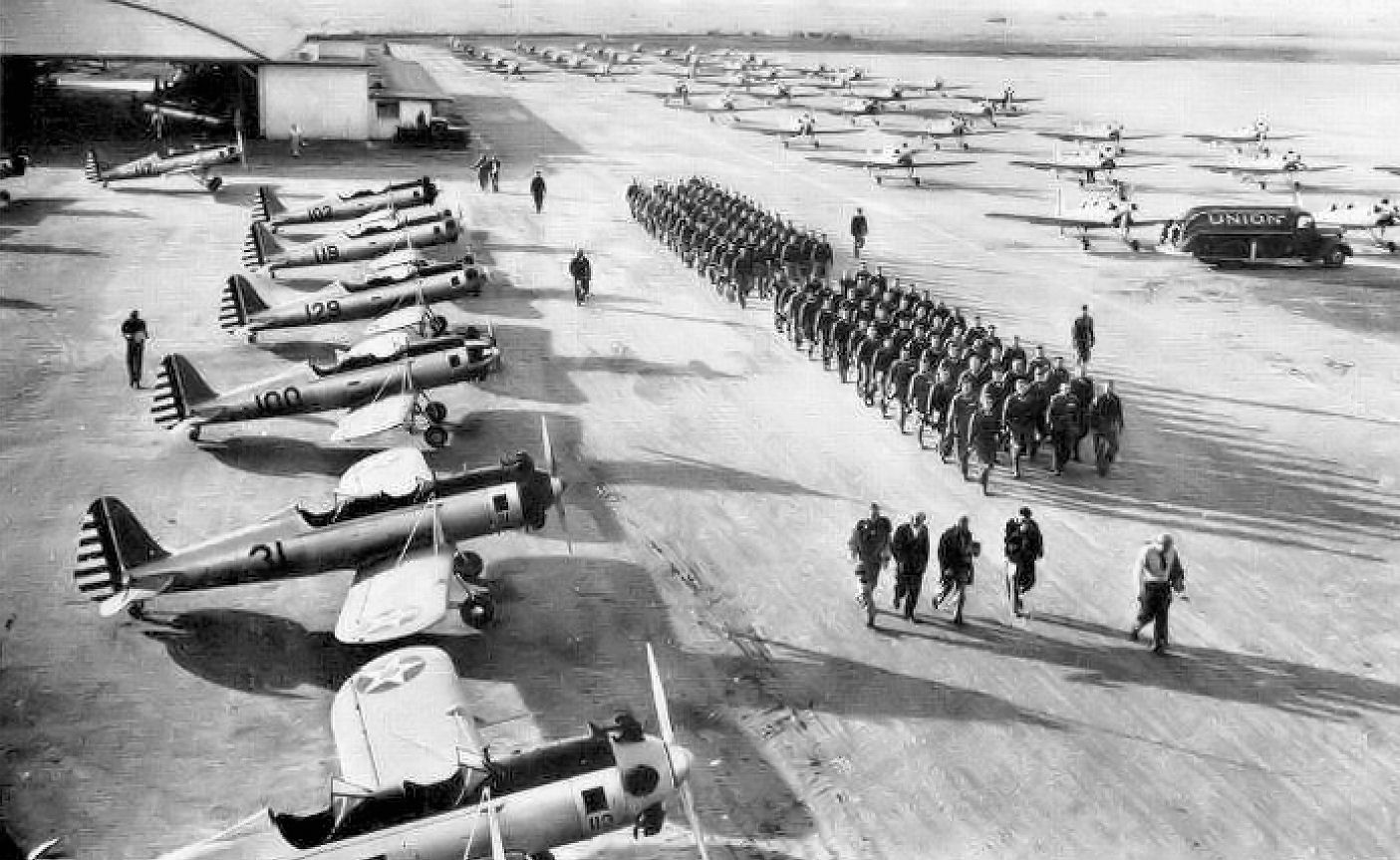
Photo of Sequoia Field flight cadets marching in front of Ryan PT-22 trainers in 1943

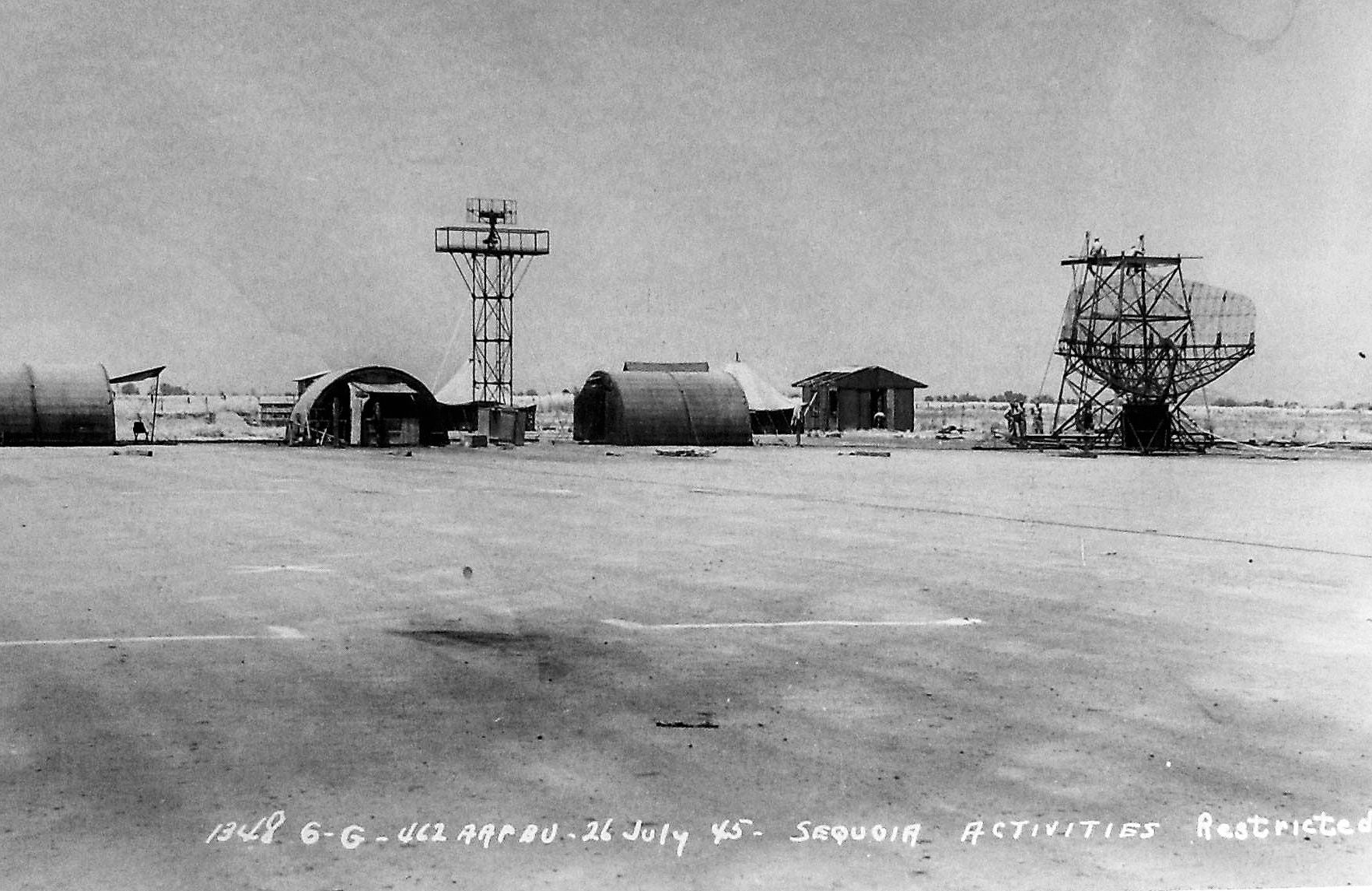
Camp Sequoia - CPS-1 Radar and training buildings, 1945

Sequoia Field Airport (FAA LID: D86, formerly Q31) is a county-owned, public-use airport located eight nautical miles (15 km) north of the central business district of Visalia, a city in Tulare County, California, United States.

== Facilities and aircraft ==
Sequoia Field covers an area of 150 acres (61 ha) at an elevation of 313 feet (95 m) above mean sea level. It has one runway designated 13/31 with an asphalt surface measuring 3,012 by 60 feet (918 x 18 m).

For the 12-month period ending January 6, 2010, the airport had 12,000 general aviation aircraft operations, an average of 32 per day. At that time there were 15 aircraft based at this airport: 40% single-engine, 27% multi-engine, 20% helicopter and 13% ultralight.

== History ==
In preparation for the eventual U.S. entry into World War II, the United States Army Air Corps sought to expand the nation's combat air forces by asking civilian flight schools to provide the primary phase of training for air cadets. Consequently, it contracted with nine civilian flying schools to provide primary flying training, with the graduates being moved on to basic and advanced training at regular military training airfields.

The original airfield had 2,300' turf runway. Sequoia Field had possibly up to six auxiliary airfields in the local area. The only one located here is Three Rivers Auxiliary Field, 36°27′30″N 118°54′00″W, which was an all-way open field. No remains of it exist.

=== Pilot training ===
Activated on 4 October 1941, Sequoia Field was assigned to the United States Army Air Forces Western Flying Training Command, 35th Flying Training Wing as a primary (level 1) pilot training airfield. The 8th Flying Training Detachment, Army Primary Flying School was Commanded by a Major L.D. Dreisbach

The Visalia-Dinuba School of Aeronautics conducted basic flying training under contract until inactivated in October 1944. The primary use of Sequoia Field was basic flying training of flight cadets. Ryan-PT22s were the primary trainer used. Several PT-17 Stearmans and a few P-40 Warhawks were also assigned. The nine weeks of training provided by civilian flying schools included 65 hours of flying instruction in addition to the standard ground school curriculum provided by the Air Corps.

The physical facilities of Sequoia Field included administrative buildings and quarters for officers and enlisted men, encircling a central location. A consolidated mess hall, which accommodated 1,000 enlisted men and a limited number of officers, was located nearby. Adjacent to the mess hall was a post exchange, a service club and a dance floor. Recreational facilities at Camp Sequoia centered on the base swimming pool. Nearby were tennis and handball courts, and a softball diamond. Regular dances were conducted at the base service club and in Visalia.

Sequoia Field was inactivated on 8 September 1944 with the draw down of AAFTC's pilot training program, and the final cadet class at Sequoia Field graduated on September 30, 1944. With its closure, the facility was declared surplus and turned over to the Army Corps of Engineers on 5 May 1945 and placed on an inactive status.

=== Radar training ===
On 23 July 1945, the post, now known as Camp Sequoia, was taken over by the Western Signal Aviation Training Center at Camp Pinedale as a sub-post. It was a replacement for nearby Camp Visalia. The garrison, which moved from Camp Visalia, consisted of Squadron F, 462nd Army Air Forces Base Unit (AAFBU) commanded by Maj. Hugh J. Roberts.

Camp Sequoia was used for the purpose of providing on-the-job training for fighter control squadron personnel in the use of the AN/CPS-1 Radar. The unit also provided training on the AN/CPS-1 for maintenance and operating crews, assigned to the controllers at Hammer Field.

The Electronics School, situated at Camp Wawona until 14 July 1945, was assigned to Camp Sequoia on that date to provide a fundamental theoretical background for radar operations. Personnel assigned to the school designed and constructed laboratory equipment and prepared lesson plans.

Camp Sequoia was evidently closed at the end of World War II, as it does not appear in any Station Lists or Airfield Directories after 1 December 1945. The facility was turned over to civil control in February 1947 through the War Assets Administration (WAA). Several wartime buildings still remain in use.

=== Current use ===
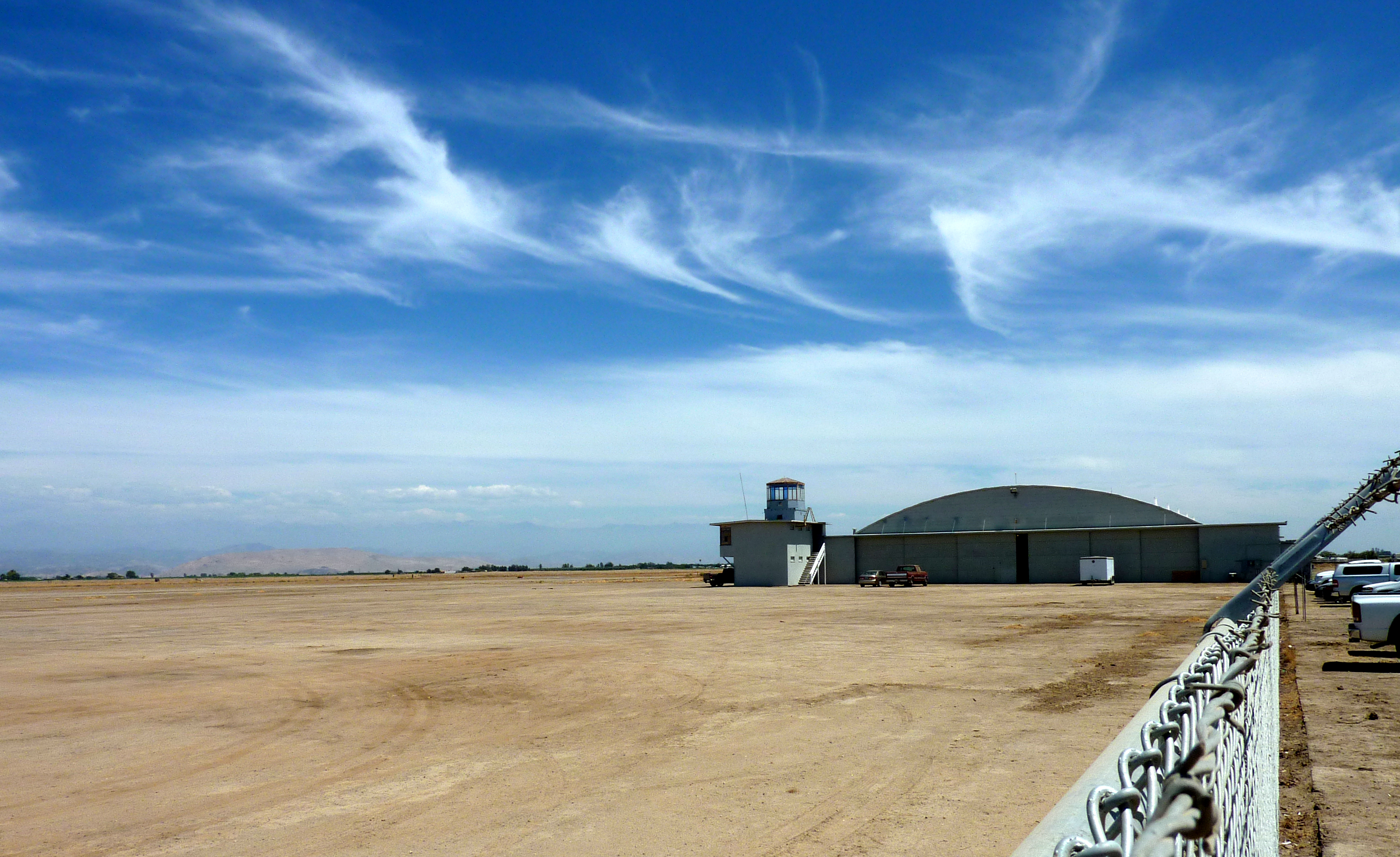
Sequoia Field - hangar from Visalia-Dinuba School of Aeronautics, 2009

Today, Sequoia Field is a modern general aviation airport. Much of the former containment area has been converted to the Tulare County Men's Correctional Facility, and many of the World War II buildings are still in use. Two World War II hangars from the military flight training field remain and are in use for general aviation aircraft. The airfield has a modern runway, although aircraft parking is noted to use part of the former wartime parking area.

== See also ==
- California World War II Army Airfields
- 35th Flying Training Wing (World War II)
