= Franklin Field (California) =

Franklin Field Franklin Air Force Auxiliary Field
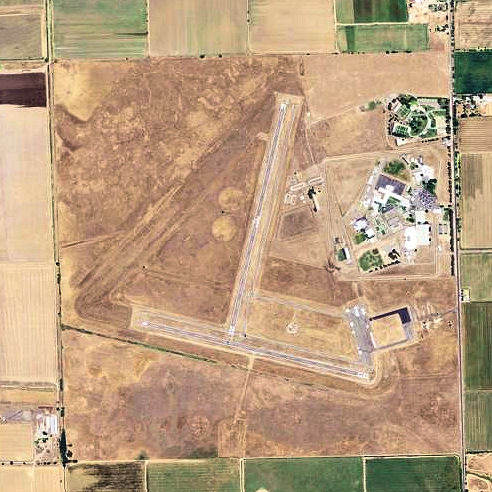
- 2006 USGS airphoto
- IATA: none; ICAO: none; FAA LID: F72

Summary
- Airport type: Public
- Operator: Sacramento County
- Location: Franklin, Sacramento County, California
- Elevation AMSL: 21 ft (6.4 m)
- Coordinates: 38°18′18″N 121°25′47″W

Map
- Location of Franklin Field

Runways
Direction	Length		Surface
Direction	ft	m	Surface
18/36	3,240	988	Asphalt
9/27	3,100	945	Asphalt

Franklin Field (FAA LID: F72), formerly Q53, is a public airport located four miles (6 km) southeast of the central business district (CBD) of Franklin in Sacramento County, California, United States. It is mostly used for general aviation. The airport was used for bomber training during World War II, and in 1947 it was acquired by the County of Sacramento.

== World War II ==
During World War II, the airport was designated as Franklin Air Force Auxiliary Field and was an auxiliary training airfield for both Mather Army Airfield and Stockton Army Airfield, California.

== Facilities and aircraft ==
Franklin Field covers 496 acres (201 ha) and has two runways:

- Runway 18/36: 3,240 x 60 ft (988 x 18 m), surface: asphalt
- Runway 9/27: 3,100 x 60 ft (945 x 18 m), surface: asphalt

For the 12-month period ending December 31, 2020, the airport averaged 89 aircraft operations per day, or about 32,500 per year. This was completely general aviation. For the same time period, 10 aircraft were based on the field, all single-engine airplanes.

== Accidents & Incidents ==
- On April 25, 2004, a Piper PA-28 Cherokee made a hard landing at Franklin. While the commercial pilot and flight instructor were practicing landings, the pilot being instructed noticed that the plane was approaching too slow. As the pilot flared to land, he touched down hard on the main gear and elected to go around. As he attempted a return to his home airport, the landing gear would not lock in the extended position for some time. After landing, it was revealed that several wing ribs were substantially damaged while maintenance personnel examined the aircraft the next day. The probable cause of the incident was found to be the pilot under instruction's failure to maintain adequate airspeed on final and a misjudged flare, leading to a stall and hard landing. Contributing were the instructor's inadequate supervision and failure to initiate timely remedial action.
- On October 10, 2009, a Tecnam P2004 Bravo experienced a loss of engine power on approach to Franklin Field. The aircraft received substantial damage when the nose landing gear was sheared off and the airplane nosed over and came to rest inverted. The probable cause of the accident was fuel starvation due to the instructor's improper fuel system management. Neither the CFI nor the student pilot on board were injured.

== Current Tenants ==
The airport currently houses the Sacramento County Sheriff's Rio Cosumnes Correctional Center (RCCC).

The Rio Cosumnes Correctional Center (RCCC) is the primary custody facility for inmates sentenced to County Jail from the Sacramento County Courts. An increasing percentage of the inmates are pre-sentence detainees housed at RCCC to keep the population at the Main Jail below the limit set by Federal decree. In addition, the Correctional Center houses inmates en route to other jurisdictions, federal prisoners under a contract with the U.S. Bureau of Prisons, and reciprocal prisoners from other counties. RCCC is the primary reception point for parole violators who are being held pending revocation hearings and the central transportation point for all defendants sentenced to State Prison. Classified as a Type II facility, RCCC accepts newly arrested persons booked by law enforcement agencies in the south part of Sacramento County. A staff of over 180 Sheriff's Office employees provides supervision to all inmates to ensure they live in a safe, secure and healthy environment. Several support services activities augment the custody staff and provide needed services and programs for inmate housing.

== See also ==
- California World War II Army Airfields
