= Peik Auxiliary Field =

Former US Army runway in San Diego, California

Coordinates: 32.764486°N 117.209635°W

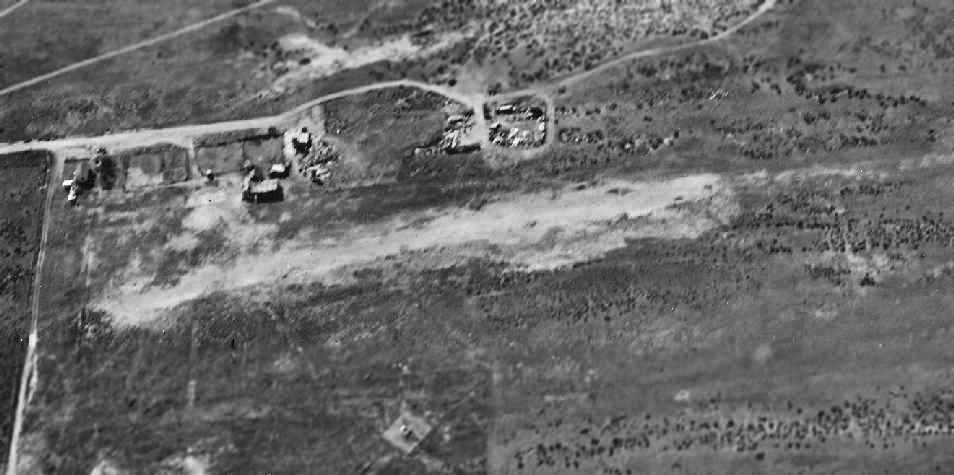
1939 photo of Peik Airport in Mission Bay, San Diego, California, before US Army improvements

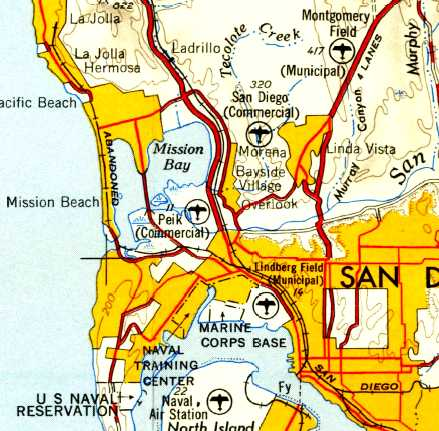
1950 map of Peik Auxiliary Field

Peik Auxiliary Field also called Peik Field and Peik Airport was an airfield used during World War II to support the San Bernardino Army Air Field, Desert Training Center and San Diego Municipal Airport, called Lindbergh Field. The local Peik Airport was built in 1934 by Arnold Peik, his son Leander Peik (1927-2011) and his family, barnstormers from Wisconsin, that also ran a flight school at the airport. Leander Peik dad taught him to fly when he was 10 years old, he became the airport manager at a young age. With the start of World War II there was a demand for trained pilots and the Army took over the Airport. Auxiliary fields, like Peik, were used to support the training of US Army pilots during World War II. The runway was located in Mission Bay of San Diego, California. The runways as in the southeast corner of Mission Bay, near the current Interstate 5 and Interstate 8 interchange. The entrance to the Peik Auxiliary Field was at the end of Anna Avenue, which at the time extended into Mission Bay. When the I-5 was built Anna Avenue was removed west of the Santa Fe train tracks. For the war, many new trained pilots were needed. Peik Auxiliary Field provided a place for pilots to practice landing and take off without other air traffic. Peik Auxiliary Field site offered flight training without distractions. The United States Army Air Corps's Army Air Forces Basic Flying School, the Army Air Force Pilot School used Peik Auxiliary Field for fighter pilots training. The Army took the runway from 800-feet to 2,600-feet long and 150-feet wide made of turfgrass. To support the training of the many pilots, San Bernardino Army Air Field operated a number of auxiliary airfields. After the war, Peik Auxiliary Field was returned to the Peik family. The Peik family closed the airport in 1955 and no trace of the runway can be found today, the site is open land in Mission Bay with Sea World Drive cutting across the past runway.

== See also ==
- California during World War II
- American Theater (1939–1945)
- United States home front during World War II
