= Lincoln Regional Airport (California) =

Airport in Lincoln, California, U.S.

Lincoln Regional Airport Karl Harder Field Lincoln Air Force Auxiliary Field
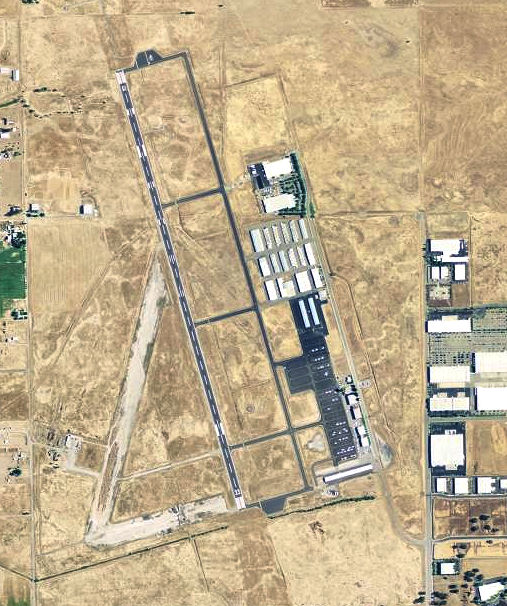
- 2006 USGS photo
- IATA: none; ICAO: KLHM; FAA LID: LHM

Summary
- Airport type: Public
- Owner: City of Lincoln
- Location: Lincoln, California
- Elevation AMSL: 121 ft (37 m)
- Coordinates: 38°54′33″N 121°21′05″W

Map
- Location within California

Runways
Direction	Length		Surface
Direction	ft	m	Surface
15/33	6,001	1,829	Asphalt

Statistics (2017)
- Aircraft operations: 74,400
- Based aircraft: 62
- Source: Federal Aviation Administration

Lincoln Regional Airport (ICAO: KLHM, FAA LID: LHM, formerly O51) (Karl Harder Field) is a public airport three miles (5 km) west of Lincoln, in Placer County, California, United States. It is owned by the City of Lincoln.

Most U.S. airports use the same three-letter location identifier for the Federal Aviation Administration and International Air Transport Association, but Lincoln Regional Airport is LHM to the FAA and has no IATA code.

== Facilities ==
The Lincoln Regional Airport covers 725 acres (293 ha); its one runway (15/33) is 6,001 x 100 ft (1,829 x 30 m) asphalt.

In the year ending December 31, 2017, the airport had 74,400 aircraft operations, average 204 per day: 96% general aviation and 4% air taxi. 62 aircraft were then based at the airport: 58 single engine, 2 multi-engine, and 2 helicopters.

== World War II ==
During World War II, the airport was Lincoln Air Force Auxiliary Field and was an auxiliary training airfield for Mather Army Airfield.

== See also ==
- California World War II Army Airfields
- Lincoln Powered Parachute Field
