= Turlock Municipal Airport =

Turlock Municipal Airport Ballico Air Force Auxiliary Field
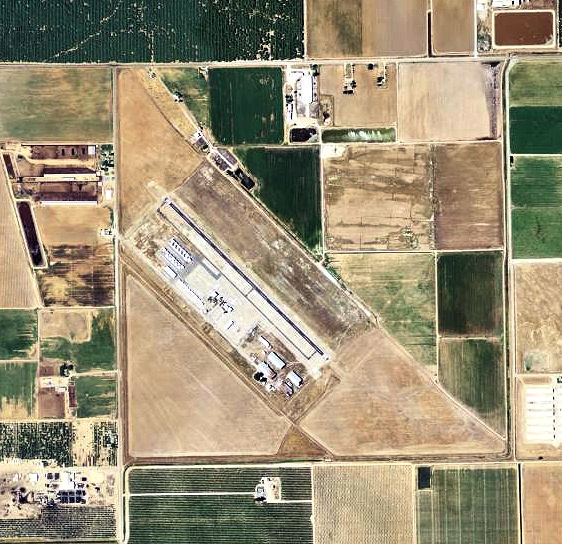
- 2006 USGS airphoto
- IATA: none; ICAO: none; FAA LID: O15

Summary
- Airport type: Public
- Operator: City of Turlock
- Location: Turlock, California
- Elevation AMSL: 159 ft / 48.5 m
- Coordinates: 37°29′15″N 120°41′49″W

Map
- Location of Turlock Municipal Airport

Runways
Direction	Length		Surface
Direction	ft	m	Surface
12/30	2,985	910	Asphalt

Turlock Municipal Airport (FAA LID: O15) is a public airport located eight miles (13 km) east of Turlock, in Merced County, California, United States. This general aviation airport covers 320 acres (129 ha) and has one runway. It was purposed during World War II to train pilots for air combat.

== World War II ==
During World War II, the airport was designated as Ballico Air Force Auxiliary Field, and was an auxiliary training airfield for Merced Army Airfield, California.

== See also ==
- California World War II Army Airfields
