= Hancock Field (California) =

Former airport in Santa Barbara County, California

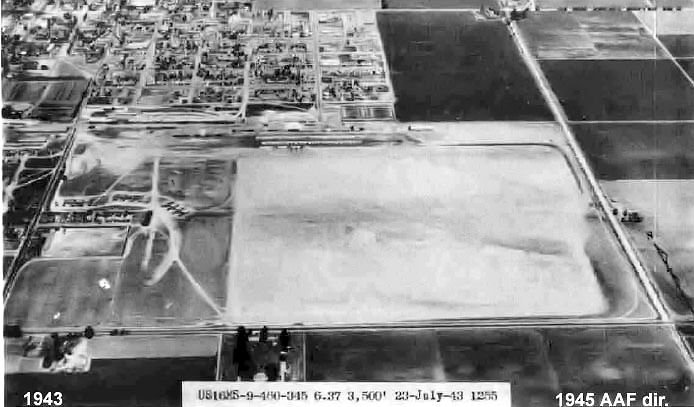
- 1943 USAAF photo
- IATA: none; ICAO: none

Summary
- Serves: Santa Maria, California
- Coordinates: 34°55′59″N 120°25′19″W

Map
- Location of Hancock Field

Runways
Direction	Length		Surface
Direction	ft	m	Surface
			All-Way grass

Hancock Field is a former airport and military airfield about 2 miles (3.2 km) south-southeast of Santa Maria, California. Also known as Santa Maria Municipal Airport, the airport was closed about 1959 and today is the site of Allan Hancock College.

== History ==
Hancock Field was founded in 1927 by Captain Allan Hancock and became the community's airport the following year. The Hancock Foundation College of Aeronautics was established in 1928. Ten-week classes were offered prospective pilot candidates, with successful individuals becoming licensed pilots. The first students graduated in 1929.

During World War II the United States Army Air Forces contracted with the Hancock Foundation College of Aeronautics to provide basic flight (level 1) instruction to aviation cadets beginning on 14 September 1940. Known sub-bases and auxiliaries:

- Santa Maria Auxiliary Field 34°48′24″N 120°26′03″W
- La Brea Auxiliary Field 34°52′52″N 120°17′36″W
- Mckinnon Auxiliary Field (Undetermined)
- Souza Auxiliary Field 34°59′39″N 120°28′50″W
- Waller-Franklin Auxiliary Field 34°55′57″N 120°31′46″W

Fairchild PT-19s were the primary trainer used. Performed contract training until 27 June 1944 with the drawdown of AAFTC's pilot training program.

Private flight training continued until the late 1950s when the airfield was closed.

== See also ==
- California World War II Army Airfields
- 36th Flying Training Wing (World War II)
