= Merced Regional Airport =

Municipal airport serving Merced, California, United States

Merced Regional Airport MacReady Field

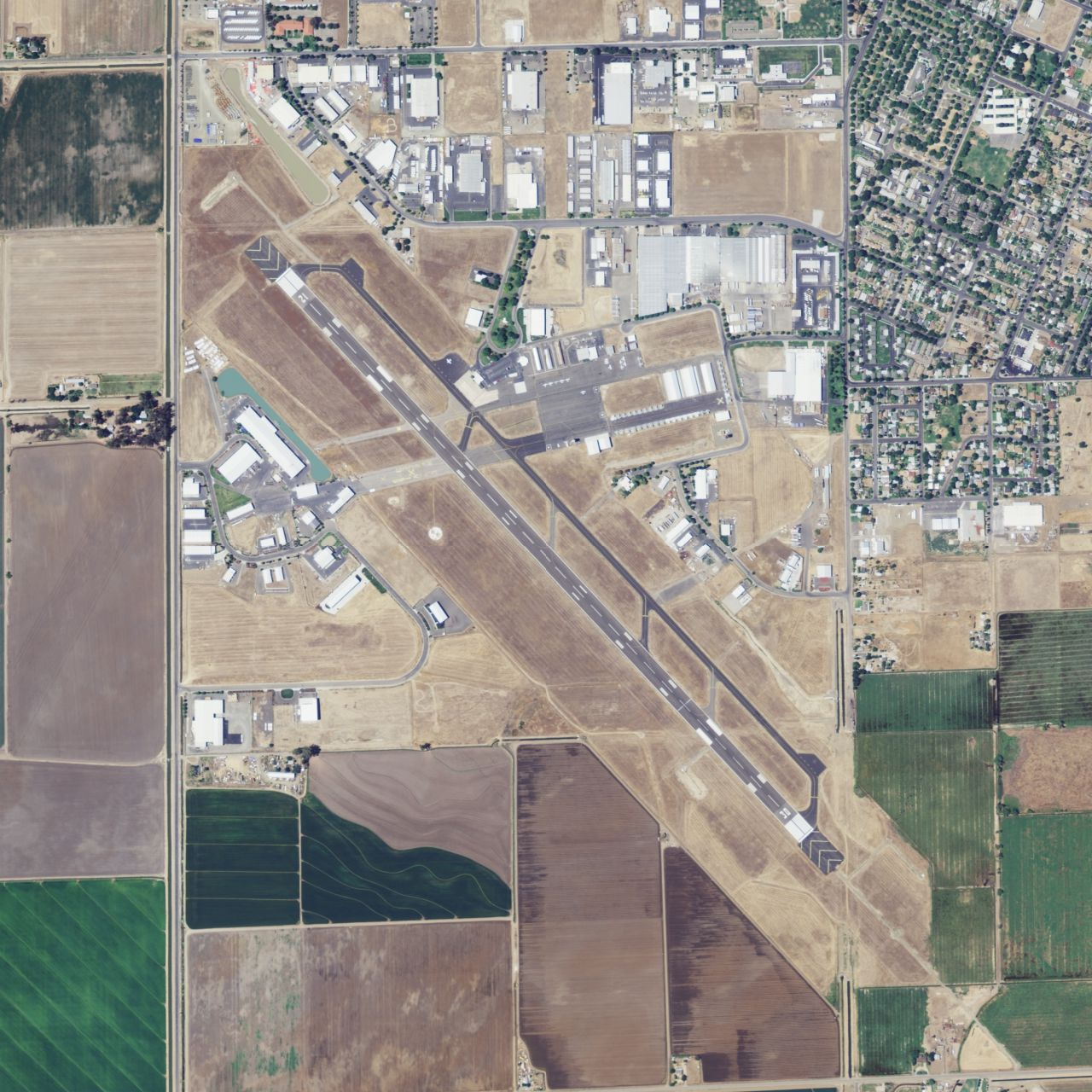
- NAIP photograph 2009
- IATA: MCE; ICAO: KMCE; FAA LID: MCE

Summary
- Airport type: Public
- Owner: City of Merced
- Serves: Merced, California
- Time zone: PST (UTC−08:00)
  - Summer (DST): PDT (UTC−07:00)
- Elevation AMSL: 155 ft / 47 m
- Coordinates: 37°17′05″N 120°30′50″W
- Website: FlyMercedAirport.com

Maps
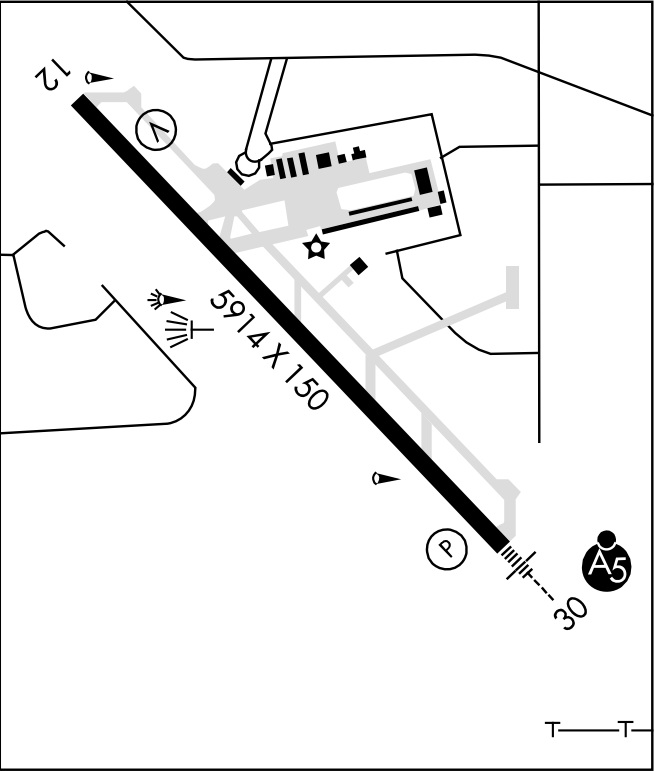

Runways
Direction	Length		Surface
Direction	ft	m	Surface
12/30	5,914	1,803	Asphalt

Statistics (2019)
- Aircraft operations: 58,650
- Based aircraft: 39
- Source: Federal Aviation Administration.

Merced Yosemite Regional Airport (MacReady Field) (IATA: MCE, ICAO: KMCE, FAA LID: MCE) is located two miles (3.2 km) southwest of Merced, in Merced County, California. The National Plan of Integrated Airport Systems for 2021–2025 categorized it as a Commercial Service – Nonprimary airport. Commercial passenger service is subsidized by the Essential Air Service program.

== History ==
On March 15, 1932 the Merced City Council accepted title to the site of an airport as a gift from the Twenty-Thirty Club and the Crocker-Huffman Company. The airport, an airstrip and 66 acres (0.27 km^{2}) of land 3 miles (4.8 km) northwest of the city near the intersection of U.S. Route 99 and California State Route 59, was dedicated on April 3, 1932. The airport site was leased to George Voight for a term of five years, and a subsidiary airline of the Stinson Aircraft Company started Merced's first scheduled airline service. In May 1936 the City of Merced assumed responsibility for the airport; constructing buildings, hangars, and other improvements; expanding the site to 123 acres (0.50 km^{2}).

In 1940 as the U.S. Army was trying to establish a 30,000 per year basic pilot training facility in the Merced area, Merced Municipal Airport was deemed unsuitable for a major training facility due to lack of room. The United States Department of War would ultimately select an area 2 miles (3.2 km) northeast of Atwater, now the site of Castle Airport, for its Air Corps Basic Flying School. That year, land the Merced Regional Airport now occupies in southwest Merced near Childs Avenue was acquired from delinquent tax rolls. The city council approved the first phase of construction of a new airport shortly after the acquisition. This new city owned airport would be known as "New Merced Municipal Airport".

In 1941 construction delays at the Air Corps Basic Flying School site forced the Army to lease the original Merced Municipal Airport, resulting in the first aircraft assigned to the Air Corps Basic Flying School being stored at Merced Municipal Airport and giving the Basic Flying School its first usable axillary field. After the United States entered World War II, the Civil Aeronautics Authority assumed responsibility for the final phase of construction of the New Merced Municipal Airport. By 1942 the new airport and its two runways; 6/24 and 12/30 each 4000' by 150', was completed by the United States Army Corps of Engineers working under the CAA.

In 1943 New Merced Municipal Airport was leased to the U.S. Army Air Force, becoming the sixth axillary field for Merced Army Airfield (present day Castle Airport). Under the lease, the airport's name was changed to "New Merced Municipal Airport Auxiliary Field". The lease was terminated immediately after the war, and the airport was returned to civil control. In the fall of 1945, the City of Merced sold the original Merced Municipal Airport site near Santa Fe Drive to the Chamber of Commerce for $7,500, leaving New Merced Municipal Airport (near Childs Ave) as the city's primary airport.

In 1946 United Airlines built offices and a terminal building and began one Douglas DC-3 flight each way a day. That year damage incurred during the Army Air Force's use of the site was repaired, and more improvements were made using federal funds. In 1948 Merced Municipal Airport was annexed to the City of Merced.

During the 1950s the airport was used to service United States Armed Forces aircraft, and a land acquisition in February 1955 allowed runway 12/30 to be extended. In 1967 runway 6/24 and its parallel taxiway were closed, and in 1975 a control tower was built.

United's DC-3s were replaced by Convair 340s, then Douglas DC-6s, then Boeing 737-200s in 1968-69. United flights to Merced ended in 1979.

On March 6, 2009 the city council voted to change the name from Merced Municipal Airport to Merced Regional Airport. In 2021, the city council voted to change the name from Merced Regional Airport to Merced Yosemite Regional Airport. In 2021, Advanced Air received a second Essential Air Service (EAS) contract for the City of Merced to provide commercial airline service to Harry Reid International Airport and Los Angeles International Airport. In 2023, the city council voted to change service from Los Angeles International Airport to Hawthorne Municipal Airport.

In December 2023, the airport broke ground on a $17 million dollar terminal replacement project. The new terminal is slated to be 11,000 square feet, up from 5,000 square feet in the current building.

=== Fly-In ===
Between 1957 and 2007 Merced Regional Airport hosted the annual Merced West Coast Antique Fly-In. Each year the fly-in drew hundreds of pilots from across the western United States to Merced to display their rare and antique aircraft. The fly-in featured an air show and an antique car show. In 2007, the 50th annual fly-in drew nearly 400 planes and several stunt pilots. Since 2008 the Merced West Coast Antique Fly-In has been canceled due to lack of sponsors and volunteers.

== Facilities ==
Merced Regional Airport covers 766 acres (310 ha) at an elevation of 155 feet (47 m). It has one runway:

- 12/30: 5,914 by 150 feet (1,803 x 46 m), Asphalt; ILS/DME; PAPI (RWY30); VASI (RWY12).

General aviation FBOs:

- Maintenance
  - Gateway Air Center
  - TDL Aero: Cirrus Aircraft authorized service center
- Flying Clubs
  - EAA - Chapter 1401

In the year ending November 21, 2019 the airport had 58,650 aircraft operations, average 161 per day: 93% general aviation, 6% airline and less than 1% military. 39 aircraft were then based at this airport: 95% single-engine, 5% multi-engine. It is a non-towered airport.

Merced Regional Airport serves as the base for Riggs Air, an air ambulance service provided by Sierra Medical Services Alliance (SEMSA) in partnership with Air Methods. Riggs Air shuttles patients between Mercy Medical Center Merced and nearby trauma centers, as well as responding directly to medical emergencies.

Bus connections to Amtrak and Yosemite National Park are available through local bus service and Yosemite Area Regional Transportation System (YARTS).

== Airlines and destinations ==
=== Passenger ===
Airlines	Destinations	Refs
Contour Airlines	Las Vegas, Los Angeles	

The airport was formerly served by Air Pacific, American Eagle, Golden Gate Airlines, United Airlines, United Express, US Airways Express, Inland Empire Airlines and Great Lakes Airlines. United Airlines had Boeing 737-200s direct to Los Angeles and San Francisco, the airport's only scheduled passenger jets.

=== Statistics ===
Top destinations from MCE (April 2025 – March 2026)
Rank	Airport	Passengers	Carriers
1	Los Angeles/Hawthorne, California	2,650	Advanced
2	Las Vegas, Nevada	2,560	Advanced

== Statistics ==
Year	Enplanements	Airline	Destinations
2008	2,173	Great Lakes Airlines	Ontario, Visalia
2009	1,052	Great Lakes Airlines	Ontario, Visalia
2010	2,051	Great Lakes Airlines	Las Vegas
2011	3,181	Great Lakes Airlines	Las Vegas, Visalia
2012	3,852	Great Lakes Airlines	Las Vegas, Visalia
2013	2,580	Great Lakes Airlines	Los Angeles, Visalia
2014	2,018	Great Lakes Airlines	Los Angeles
2015	2,000	Great Lakes Airlines	Los Angeles
2016	9,426	Great Lakes Airlines	Los Angeles, Oakland
2017	8,318	Boutique Air	Los Angeles, Oakland
2018	7,355	Boutique Air	Los Angeles, Sacramento
2019	6,816	Boutique Air	Los Angeles, Sacramento
2020	4,499	Boutique Air	Los Angeles, Sacramento
2021	5,301	Boutique Air	Las Vegas, Los Angeles, Sacramento
2022	3,431	Advanced Air	Hawthorne, Las Vegas
2023	7,400	Advanced Air	Hawthorne, Las Vegas
2024	9,560	Advanced Air	Hawthorne, Las Vegas
2025	9,678	Advanced Air	Hawthorne, Las Vegas

== In popular culture ==
The airport has been used as a filming location for projects including:

- In 1973, the Merced Terminal appears in the beginning of Mannix, season 7, episode 3 (series #149), "Climb a Deadly Mountain". However, Mannix's (light twin) flight is described as departing from Burbank airport.

== See also ==
- Castle Airport
- Gustine Airport
- Los Banos Municipal Airport
- California World War II Army Airfields
- Merced Army Airfield auxiliary fields

== Other sources ==
- This article incorporates public domain material from the Air Force Historical Research Agency
- Essential Air Service documents (Docket DOT-OST-1998-3521) from the U.S. Department of Transportation:
  - Order 2004-3-6 (March 9, 2004): re-selecting Eagle Canyon Airlines, Inc., d/b/a Scenic Airlines, to provide essential air service at Merced, California, at an annual subsidy rate of $645,751, for the two-year April 1, 2004, through March 31, 2006.
  - Order 2006-3-28 (March 28, 2006): selecting Scenic Airlines to provide essential air service (EAS) with 19-passenger Beechcraft 1900 aircraft at Merced, California, for two years beginning April 1, 2006. The annual subsidy rate will be set at $696,788.
  - Order 2006-8-29 (August 30, 2006): selecting Mesa Air Group Inc. d/b/a Air Midwest to provide subsidized essential air service (EAS) at Merced and Visalia, California, and Ely, Nevada, for two years, beginning when the carrier inaugurates service. Merced and Visalia will receive 23 weekly round trips to Las Vegas, operated on a Las Vegas - Merced - Visalia - Las Vegas or Las Vegas - Visalia - Merced - Las Vegas routing at an annual subsidy rate of $1,599,207. Ely will receive 6 nonstop round trips each week to Salt Lake City at an annual subsidy rate of $647,709. Air Midwest will operate as America West Express/US Airways Express and serve each community with 19-passenger Beech 1900-D aircraft.
  - Order 2008-6-26 (June 19, 2008): selecting Great Lakes Aviation, Ltd. to provide subsidized essential air service (EAS) at Merced and Visalia, California, and Ely, Nevada, for the two-year period beginning when the carrier inaugurates full EAS pursuant to this Order, at an annual subsidy of $4,900,401 with 19-seat Beech 1900D turboprop aircraft.
  - Order 2010-9-13 (September 9, 2010): re-selecting Great Lakes Aviation, Ltd., to provide subsidized essential air service (EAS) with 19-passenger Beechcraft-B-1900D aircraft at Merced and Visalia, California, and Ely, Nevada, for the two-year period from October 1, 2010, through September 31, 2012. The annual subsidy rates will be set at $1,961,174, $1,746,507, and $1,752,067 for Merced, Visalia and Ely, respectively, for a combined total of $5,459,748.
  - Order 2012-9-9 (September 10, 2012): re-selecting Great Lakes Aviation, Ltd., to provide subsidized Essential Air Service (EAS) with 19-passenger Beechcraft B-1900D aircraft at Merced and Visalia, California, for the two-year period from October 1, 2012, through September 31, 2014. The annual subsidy rates will be set at $1,698,878 and $1,697,929, for Merced and Visalia, respectively, for a combined total of $3,396,807.
  - Order 2014-4-26 (April 24, 2014): directing interested persons to show cause as to why the Department should not terminate the eligibility ... under the Essential Air Service (EAS) program based on criteria passed by Congress in the FAA Modernization and Reform Act of 2012 (Public Law No. 112-95). We find that Merced is within 175 miles of a large or medium hub, Mineta San Jose International Airport (SJC), a medium hub, and, thus, is subject to the 10-enplanement statutory criterion. We also find that during fiscal year 2013, Merced generated a total of 4,810 passengers (inbound plus outbound). Consistent with the methodology described above, that results in an average of 7.7 enplanements per day, below the 10-enplanement statutory criterion necessary to remain eligible in the EAS program.
