= Eagle Field (airport) =

Airport in Fresno County, California

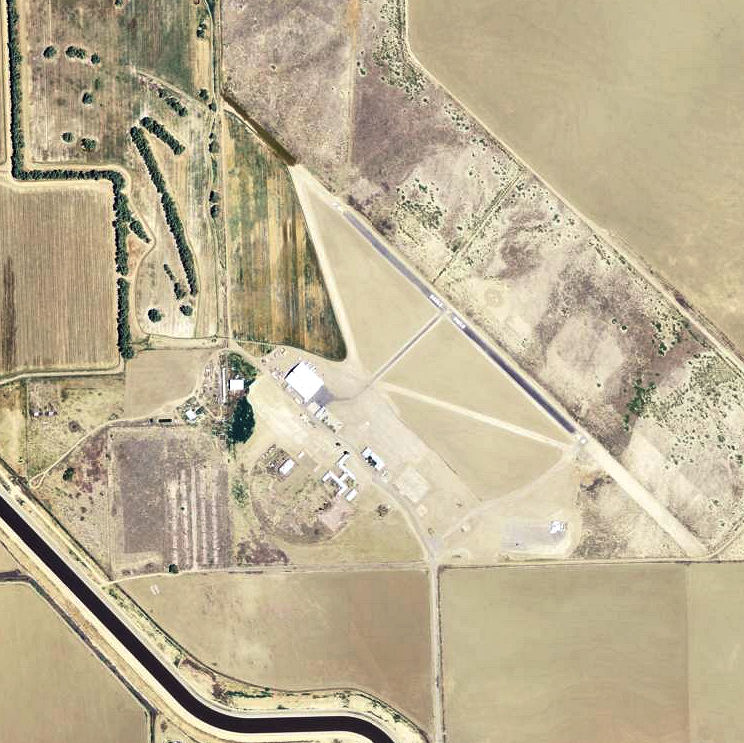
- USGS 2006 orthophoto
- IATA: none; ICAO: none; FAA LID: CL01

Summary
- Airport type: Private
- Owner: Eagle Field Airport LLC
- Serves: Dos Palos, California
- Elevation AMSL: 153 ft (47 m)
- Coordinates: 36°53′59″N 120°40′04″W
- Website: https://www.eagle-field.org/

Map
- Location of airport in California

Runways
Direction	Length		Surface
Direction	ft	m	Surface
12/30	2,300	701	Asphalt

Statistics
- Based aircraft: 8
- Source: Federal Aviation Administration

Eagle Field (FAA LID: CL01) is a privately owned, private use airport in Fresno County, California, United States. It is located seven nautical miles (8 mi, 13 km) southwest of the central business district of Dos Palos, a city in neighboring Merced County.

== History ==
It was first activated on June 24, 1943, as United States Army Air Forces primary (level 1) pilot training airfield known as Dos Palos Airport. It was assigned to the USAAF West Coast Training Center (later Western Flying Training Command), operated under contract by Coast Aviation Corp. The airport had three turf runways, aligned 00/18 (1,900 feet); 09/27 (1,900 feet), and 13/31 (2,300 feet). It had several satellite airfields in the local area for emergency and overflow landings.

- Hammond Auxiliary Field (location undetermined)
- Vail Auxiliary Field (36°46′12″N 120°40′00″W)
- Dos Palos Emergency Field (36°50′35″N 120°43′00″W)
- Canal Field Auxiliary Field (36°56′34″N 120°47′20″W)
- Mason Auxiliary Field (36°43′50″N 120°34′50″W)

Flying training was performed with Ryan PT-22s as the primary trainer. Also had several PT-17 Stearmans and a few P-40 Warhawks assigned. It was inactivated on December 28, 1944, with the drawdown of AAFTC's pilot training program and was declared surplus and turned over to the Army Corps of Engineers.

The base was then used as an aircraft storage depot for excess USAAF training aircraft, having UC-78s, PT-17s, Vultee BT-13/15, and AT-6 Texans. Eventually it was discharged to the War Assets Administration (WAA) and is now from time to time used as a crop dusting airfield. After the war, the City of Dos Palos briefly operated a golf course on the site before the property reverted to the federal government. In 1980 it was put up for auction.

== In popular culture ==
Eagle Field was in a short scene of the movie Indiana Jones and the Kingdom of the Crystal Skull.

== Heritage of Eagles Air Museum ==
It is the home of the Heritage of Eagles Air Museum. Many wartime buildings remain at the airfield.

== Facilities and aircraft ==
Eagle Field covers an area of 127 acres (51 ha) at an elevation of 153 feet (47 m) above mean sea level. It has one runway designated 12/30 with an asphalt surface measuring 2,300 by 60 feet (701 x 18 m). There are 8 aircraft based at this airport: 6 single-engine, 1 multi-engine, and 1 jet.

== See also ==
- California World War II Army Airfields
- 35th Flying Training Wing (World War II)

== Other sources ==
- Manning, Thomas A. (2005), History of Air Education and Training Command, 1942–2002. Office of History and Research, Headquarters, AETC, Randolph AFB, Texas OCLC 71006954, 29991467
- Shaw, Frederick J. (2004), Locating Air Force Base Sites, History’s Legacy, Air Force History and Museums Program, United States Air Force, Washington DC. OCLC 57007862, 1050653629
