= Minter Army Airfield auxiliary fields =

WWII-era US airfields in Kern County, California

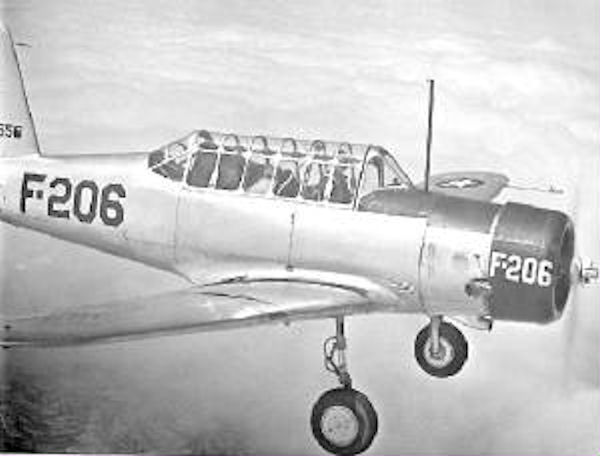
Vultee BT-13 Valiant in California, an Army training plane

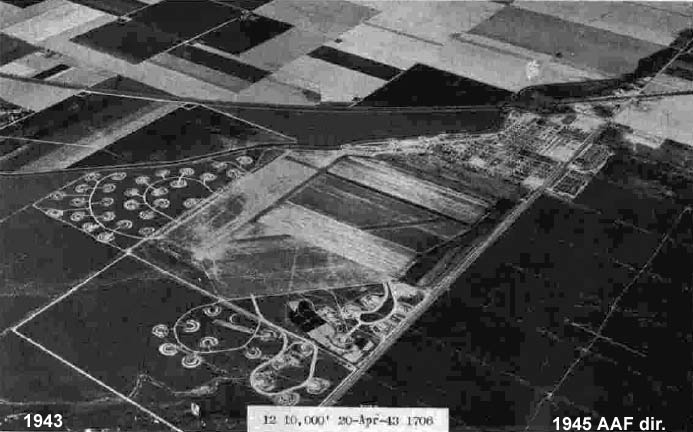
Minter Army Airfield in 1945

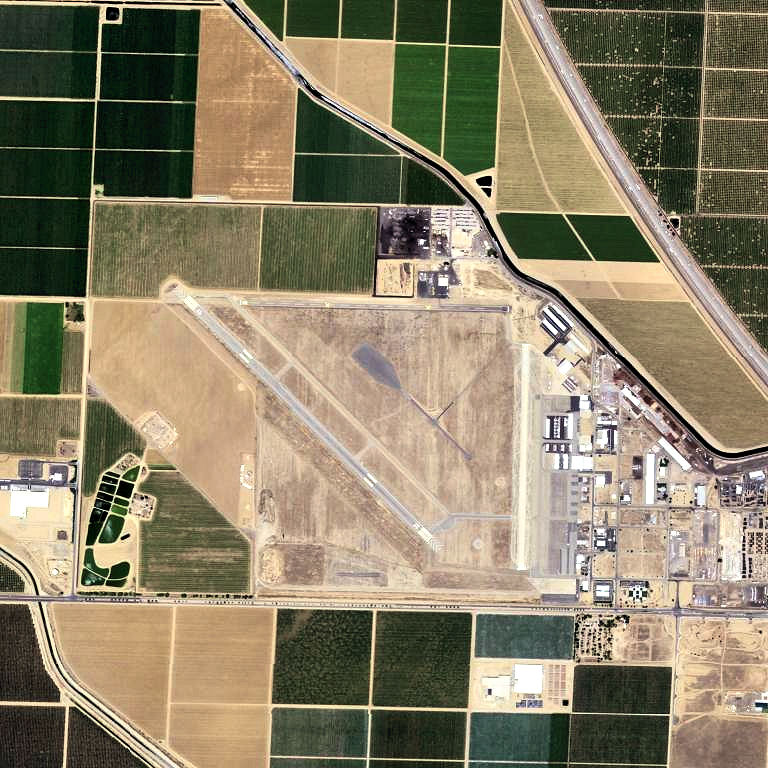
Minter Army Airfield, now Shafter Airport in 2006

Minter Army Airfield auxiliary fields were a number of airfields used during World War II to support the Minter Army Airfield (now the Shafter Airport) near Shafter, California. Minter Army Airfield was also called Lerdo Field, after the nearby road. Minter Army Airfield also housed the Shafter Gap Filler Annex P-59A and Shafter Army Aviation Test Activity and opened in June 1941. An Army depot opened on the base in October 1941, the Minter Sub-Depot, a division of the Sacramento Air Depot. Minter Army Airfield had 7,000 troops and civilians working at the base.

== Naming ==
Minter Army Airfield was named after First Lieutenant Hugh C. Minter, a World War I veteran killed in a mid-air collision at March Field in July 1932. The Army built three 4,500-foot runways on the 1,466-acre site, to support training activities need for World War II. Also at Airfield were built three square landing mat. The From Minter Army Airfield the United States Army Air Corps's Western Flying Training Command started training the needed pilots. To support the training of the many pilots, Minter Army Airfield operated a number of auxiliary airfields. Some auxiliary fields were no more than a landing strip, others were other operation airfield that supported the training at the Minter Army Airfield. The Vultee BT-13 Valiant and Boeing-Stearman Model 75 were the most common plane used for training at Minter Army Airfields, but large bombers were trained also. Minter Army Airfield auxiliary fields were:

== Wasco Auxiliary Field ==
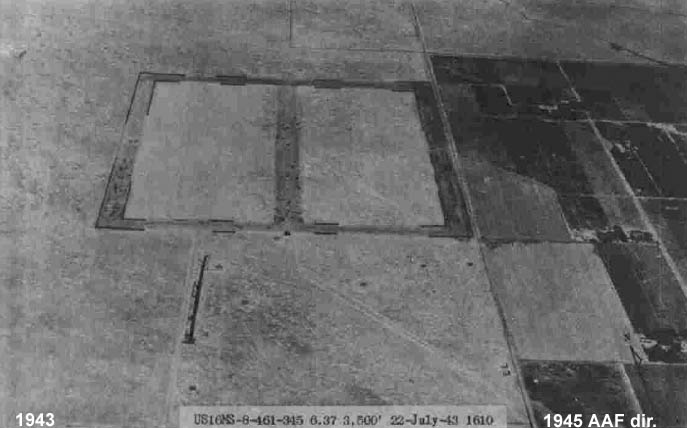
Wasco Auxiliary Field in 1945

Wasco Auxiliary Field or Wasco Field No. 1 was a satellite airfield of Minter Field, 1.5 miles north the town of Wasco, California, at 35°37′11″N 119°21′13″W at an elevation of 313 ft (95 m). The US Army leased the small 40-acre Wasco Airport and 120 acres north of the airport from Kern County on June 16, 1941. Minter Field was 12 miles to the southeast of Wasco Field. The Army built a five-runway landing mat on the site, with no other improvements. In 1944 Pond Field was closed and the lease ended on June 30, 1951. The Wasco Auxiliary Field is now the Wasco-Kern County Airport a single runway on a public airport.

== Pond Auxiliary Field ==
Pond Auxiliary Field or Pond Field No. 2 or was a satellite airfield of Minter Field, just south/west of the town of Pond, California, at 35°42′36″N 119°20′59″W. The US Army leased 158 acres from Kern County on June 16, 1941. Minter Field was 16 miles southeast of Pond Field. The Army built a 5 runway landing mat on the site, with no other improvements. On August 8, 1942, Stewart Smith was killed while approaching Pond Field, he was with the 525th School Squadron, his plane stalled 6 miles west of Pond Field on. In May 1944 Pond Field was closed and the lease ended. Pond Field was located at what is now northeast of the intersection of Peterson Road & Magnolia Avenue, in Pond, California. There is no trace of the airfield and the land is now used for agriculture.

== Famoso Auxiliary Field ==
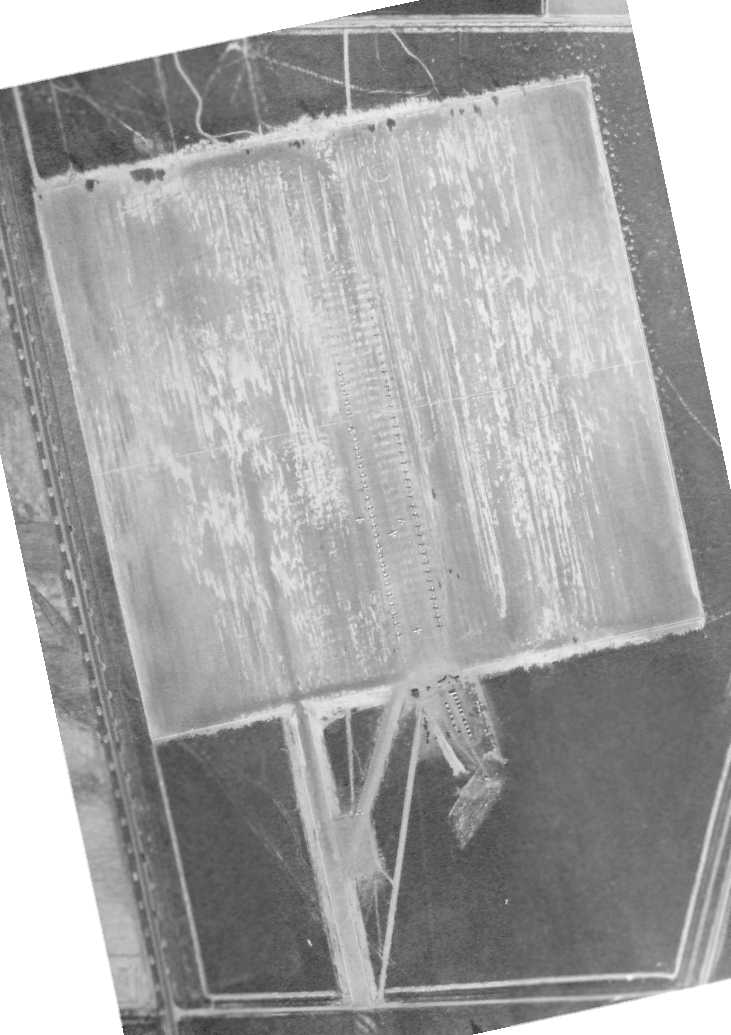
Famoso Auxiliary Field in 1944

Famoso Auxiliary Field or Minter Auxiliary Field No. 3' was a satellite airfield of Minter Field for flight training. Famoso Auxiliary Field was located 2 miles north of Famoso, California, and 24 miles north-northwest of Bakersfield in Kern County at 35°38′20″N 119°12′35″W. The US Army acquired 500 acres from County of Kern on July 1, 1941. Minter Field / Lerdo Field is 9 miles to the south of Famoso Auxiliary Field. The Army built a 3,000 × 3,000-foot landing area, three buildings: Stage House, Crash Truck Shelter and Latrine. Pilot Leroy McDonald was killed in an A BT-13 trainer crash at Famoso Field on April 22, 1942, on plane serial no. 41–10699. After the war, Famoso Auxiliary Field was closed and there is no trace of the former landing mat. Famoso Auxiliary Field was at what is now east of Highway 99 and south of Whistler Road.

== Dunlap Auxiliary Field ==
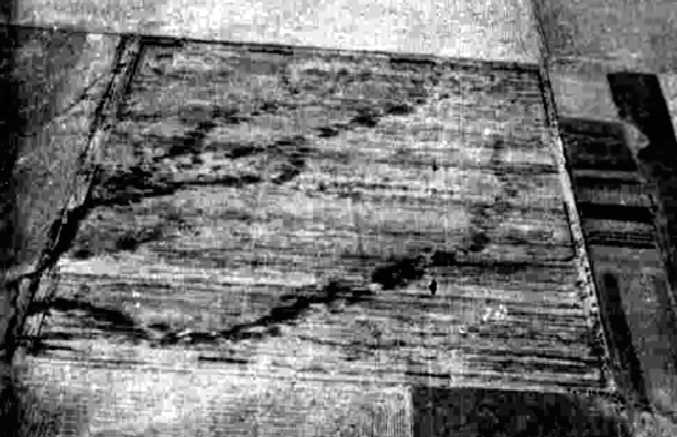
Dunlap Auxiliary Field in 19434

Dunlap Auxiliary Field also called Minter Field Auxiliary Field No. 4 and Jasmin Field was a satellite airfield of Minter Field. Located in Jasmin, California in Kern County at 35°44′05″N 119°07′00″W. Dunlap Auxiliary Field was 19 miles north-northeast of Minter Field at an elevation of 530 feet. Dunlap Auxiliary Field was open in 1941 on a 210.22 acres site and used to train World War II pilots in landing and take off. The site was also used as emergency landing airfield. The runway was a square mat 2,640 feet by 2640 feet. The mat was used for Boeing-Stearman Model 75 trainer bi-planes. No improvements were built at the airfield. There were two crash accidents at Dunlap Field, a BT-13 trainer crash-landed on April 8, 1942, the planes serial no. was 41–9665, piloted by William Raabe. A North American T-6 Texan AT-6C trainer crashed at Dunlap Field on July 23, 1945, it was serial no. 42–3911, piloted by Kay Nelson. After the war the field was closed on 8 October 1946 and no trace of the airfield can be seen today. The Dunlap Auxiliary Field was located at the present-day site of (north of) Hart Avenue and between Kyte Avenue and Quality Road, one mile east of Jasmin in a vineyard of Pandol and Sons. The site is between California State Route 99 and California State Route 65.

== Semitropic Auxiliary Field ==
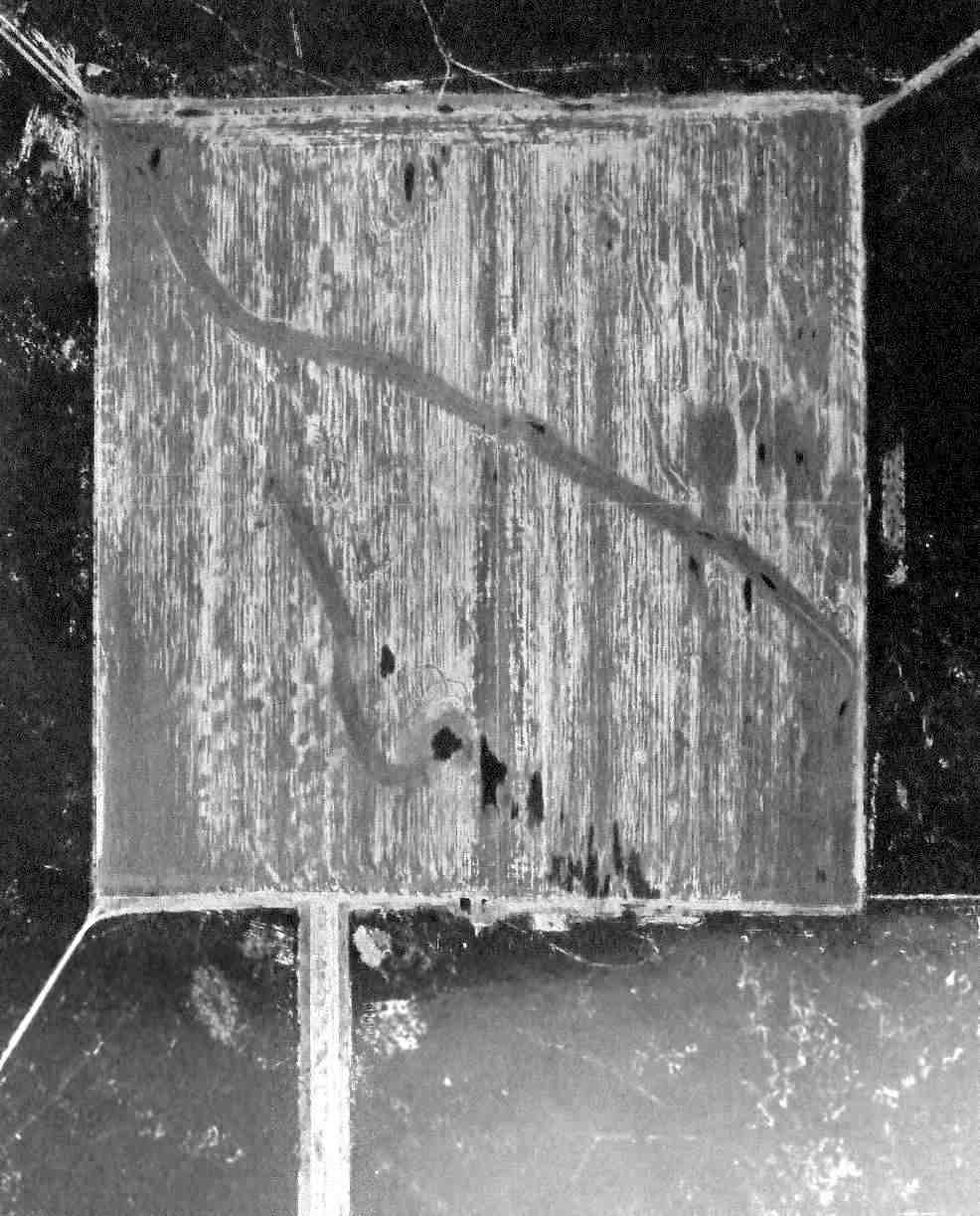
Semitropic Auxiliary Field Landing Mat in 1944

Semitropic Auxiliary Field or Semitropic Auxiliary Field No. 5 was a satellite airfield of Minter Field for flight training. Semitropic Auxiliary Field was 7 miles northwest of Minter Field. Semitropic Auxiliary Field was located 8 miles west of Wasco, California at 35°45′25″N 119°29′05″W in Kern County at an elevation of 265 feet. In 1942 the US Army acquired 600 acres of land for the runway from 11 landowners. The Army built: crash truck shelter, stage house, latrines, 3,000 by 3,000-foot landing mat and a runway. One crash happened one mile north of the runway on October 24, 1943, Otto Piepnbrink was killed in a BT-13A trainer, he was with the 324th Basic Flight Training Squadron. At the end of the war the land was sold on November 20, 1946. There is no trace of the airfield and the land is now used for agriculture by three owners.

== Poso Auxiliary Field ==
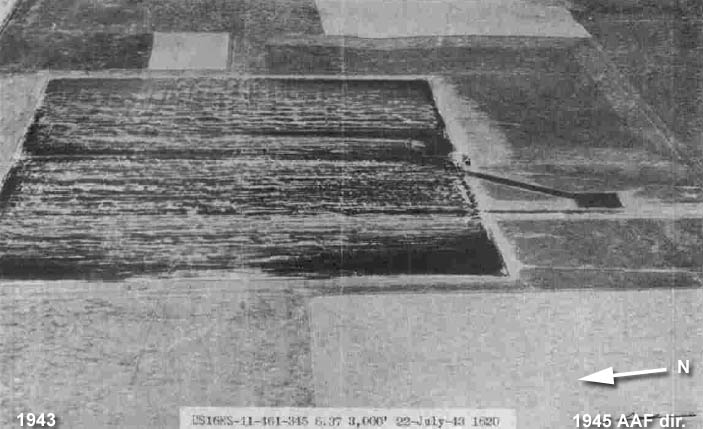
Poso Auxiliary Field in 1944

Poso Auxiliary Field or Poso Field Aux No. 6 was a satellite training airfield of Minter Field, just south-east of the town of Poso, California, renamed Famoso, California at 35°35′45″N 119°08′05″W at an elevation of 635 feet. Poso Auxiliary Field is east of Wasco, California. Minter Field was 7 miles to the southwest of Poso Auxiliary Field. Poso Auxiliary Field covered 400 acres. A 3,000 by 3,000 landing mat was built in 1942. Poso Auxiliary Field was closed on 8 October 1946. In 1950 the west of runway became the Famoso Raceway, a Dragstrip. The east side became Poso Airport, also called the Poso-Kern County Airport.

== Lost Hills Auxiliary Field ==
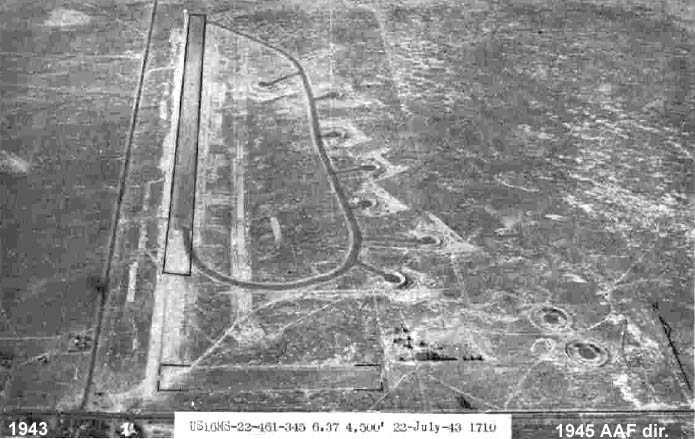
Lost Hills Auxiliary Field in 1945

Lost Hills Auxiliary Field or Lost Hills Field No. 7 was a satellite airfield of Minter Field, just north of the town of Lost Hills, California at 35°37′20″N 119°40′50″W. In 1942 the War Department received the free use of land from Mrs. Jean Atkinson on November 5, 1942. Later in 1943 the Army added 288.26 acres of free land was received from Standard Oil Company of California on August 30, 1943. The Army built a 5,000-foot runway and a 1,600-foot clay landing strip at Lost Hills Auxiliary Field. The 5,000-foot runway was used for training bomber pilots like the North American B-25 Mitchell and Lockheed P-38 Lightning. Lost Hills Auxiliary Field was closed on January 11, 1945, and became the Lost Hills Airport a public airport.

== See also ==
- California World War II Army Airfields
- California during World War II
- American Theater (1939–1945)
- Desert Training Center
- Military history of the United States during World War II
- United States home front during World War II
- Chico Army Airfield auxiliary fields
- Gardner Army Airfield auxiliary fields
