= Poso Airport =

Poso Airport Poso-Kern County Airport
- IATA: none; ICAO: none; FAA LID: L73

Summary
- Airport type: Public
- Owner: County of Kern Dept. of Airports
- Serves: Famoso, California
- Elevation AMSL: 635 ft / 194 m
- Coordinates: 35°35′47″N 119°07′42″W
- Interactive map of Poso Airport

Runways
Direction	Length		Surface
Direction	ft	m	Surface
16/34	3,000	914	Asphalt

Statistics (2010)
- Aircraft operations: 1,000
- Source: Federal Aviation Administration

Poso Airport (FAA LID: L73), also known as Poso-Kern County Airport, is a county-owned public-use airport located four nautical miles (7 km) east of the central business district of Famoso, in Kern County, California, United States. It is mostly used for general aviation.

== Facilities and aircraft ==
Poso-Kern County Airport covers an area of 400 acres (160 ha) at an elevation of 635 feet (194 m) above mean sea level. It has one runway designated 16/34 with an asphalt surface measuring 3,000 by 60 feet (914 x 18 m). For the 12-month period ending March 17, 2010, the airport had 1,000 general aviation aircraft operations, an average of 83 per month.

== History ==
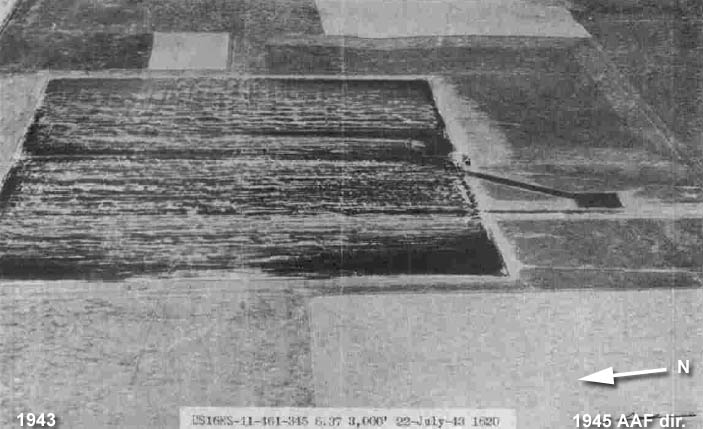
Poso Auxiliary Field in 1944

Built as the Poso Auxiliary Field or Poso Field Aux No. 6, this was a satellite training airfield of Minter Field named for the city of Poso, California, that was renamed Famoso, California. Poso Auxiliary Field covered 400 acres and was used for training World War II pilots in landing and takeoff. The US Army built a 3,000 by 3,000 landing mat airstrip in 1942. The Vultee BT-13 Valiant and Boeing-Stearman Model 75 were the most common planes used for training at Poso Auxiliary Field and the Minter Army Airfields.

Poso Auxiliary Field was closed on October 8, 1946.

In 1950, the west side of the runway became the Famoso Raceway, a dragstrip. The east side became Poso Airport.

== See also ==
- List of airports in Kern County, California
- Minter Army Airfield auxiliary fields
- California during World War II
- American Theater (1939–1945)
- Military history of the United States during World War II
- United States home front during World War II
