= Wally Parks NHRA Motorsports Museum =

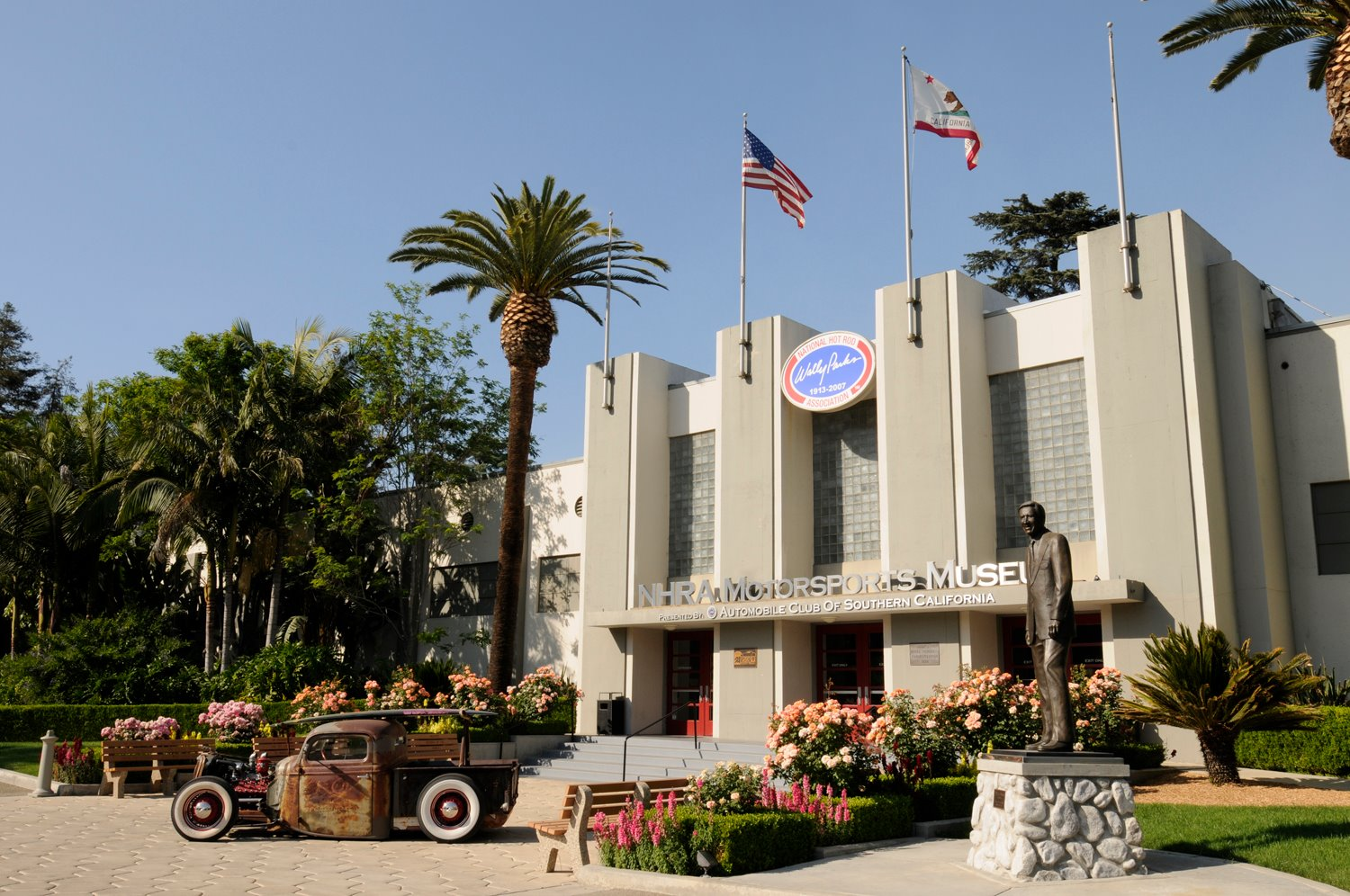
- Established: April 4, 1998
- Location: 1101 West McKinley Avenue; Building 3A; Pomona, California; United States
- Coordinates: 34.0810699°N 117.7667822°W
- Type: Automotive museum
- Director: Larry Fisher
- Curator: Greg Sharp
- Website: nhramuseum.org

The Wally Parks NHRA Motorsports Museum, located in the Fairplex, Pomona, Los Angeles County, California, houses a collection of memorabilia, automobiles, and motorcycles related to the sport of hot-rodding.

== History ==
The museum was created by a group of long-time National Hot Rod Association staff members and led by NHRA founder Wally Parks, for whom the museum was renamed on his ninetieth birthday.

Steve Gibbs, now a retired vice-president of NHRA, led the team that reconditioned a WPA-constructed 28,500-square-foot (2,650 m^{2}) building to house the museum, located on the site of the parking lot where the first NHRA-sanctioned drag race took place, in the then-named L.A. County Fairgrounds. The museum opened to the public in 1998.

== Collections ==
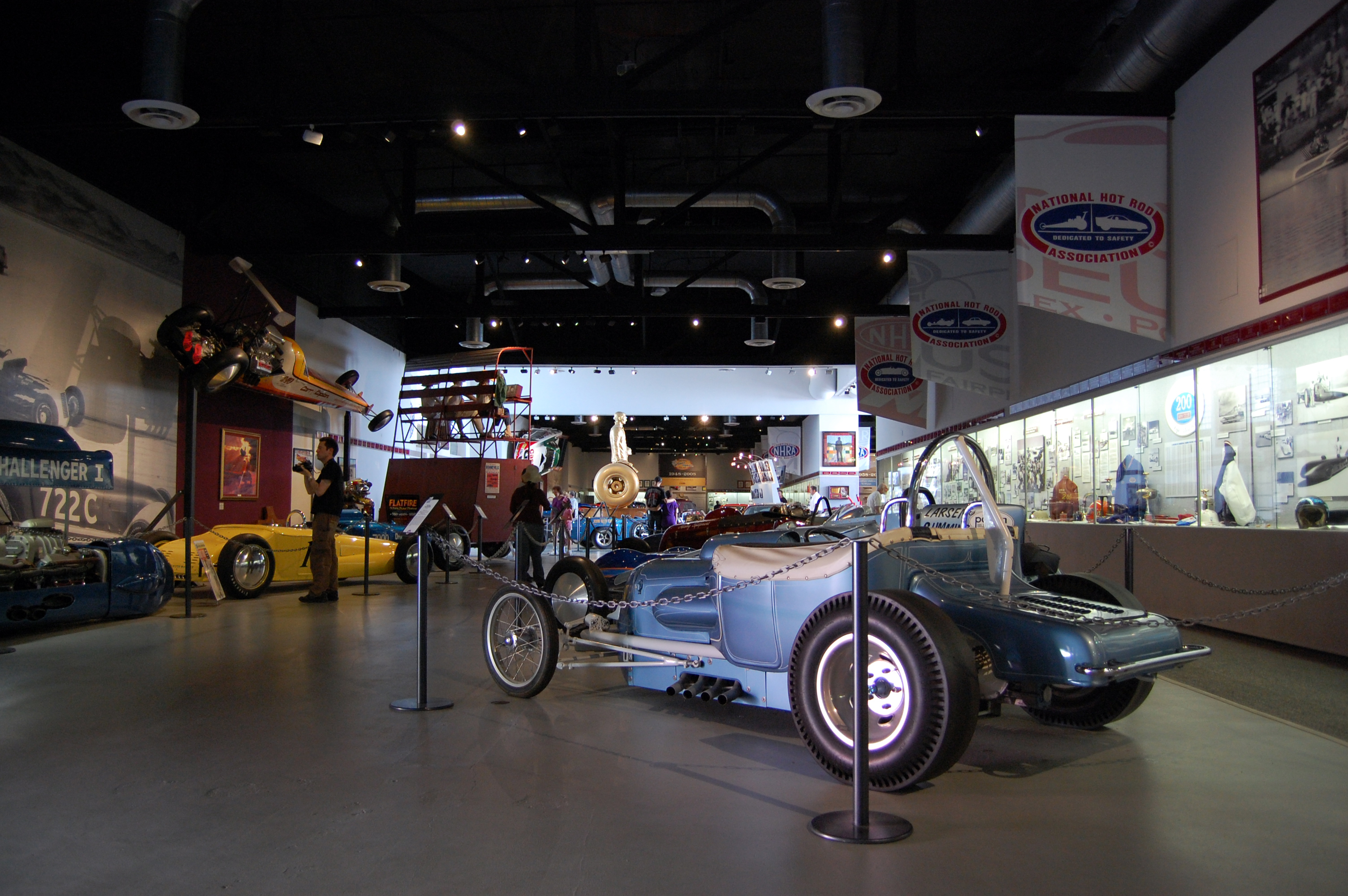

Among the exhibits is one of A. J. Foyt's Coyote Indy Cars, Kenny Bernstein's first dragster to reach speeds in excess of 300 mph (480 km/h), the Bob McClung helmet and photo collection, a collection of Indianapolis 500 credentials and artifacts from early events in the history of land speed records and hot rods. Temporary exhibits have also been created to honor participants in hot rodding including Vic Edelbrock, Don Prudhomme, the 1932 Ford, Track Roadsters, Parnelli Jones, and the So-Cal Speed Shop.

In 2008, the museum began hosting a special exhibition dedicated to Gale Banks and his contributions to the sport of drag racing. The exhibit is entitled "Banks Power: The First 50 Years."

== Finances ==
The museum is structured as a non-profit organization under the laws of the United States, section 501(c)(3) of the Internal Revenue Code. It produces and benefits from two annual hot rod reunions. The Holley NHRA National Hot Rod Reunion is held in June at Beech Bend Park in Bowling Green, Kentucky. The NHRA California Hot Rod Reunion is held in October at Famoso Raceway in Bakersfield, California.
