= Famoso =

Famoso may refer to:

- Famoso Raceway, a dragstrip is located north of Bakersfield, California
- Famoso, California, an unincorporated community in Kern County, California
- El Famoso, the nickname of Carlos Hernández (boxer)
- Famoso, a 2020 album by Sfera Ebbasta
