= Gardner Army Airfield =

World War II United States Army Air Force airfield

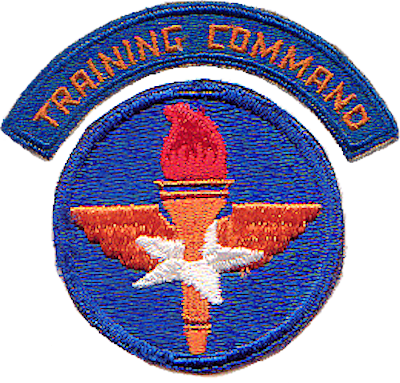
Gardner Army Airfield
- Part of Army Air Force Training Command
- Kern County, near Taft, California
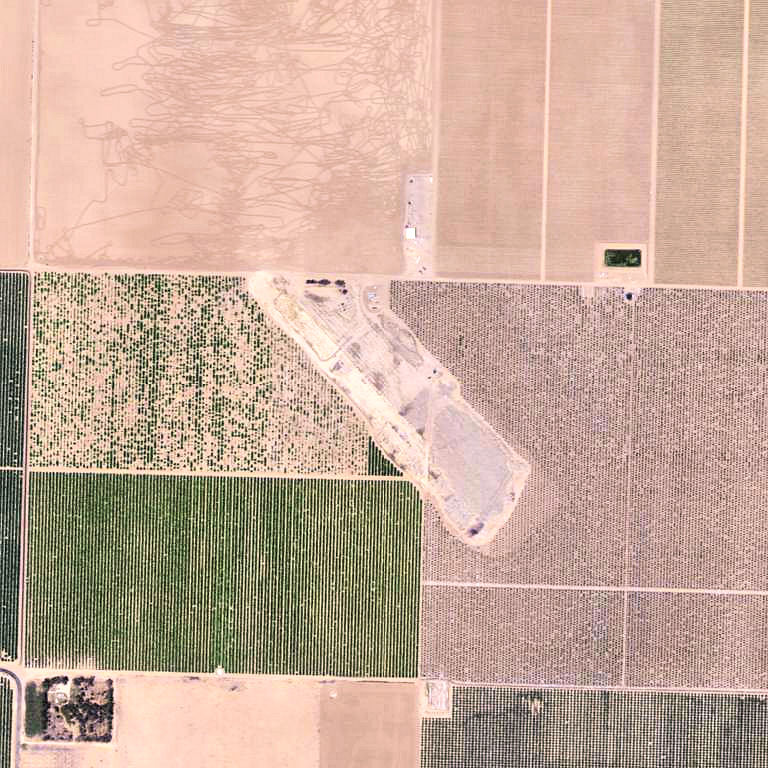
- Aerial photo of the remains of Gardner AAF, 2006. The largest remaining recognizable element of the airfield is the 1,800' concrete and asphalt ramp area, which runs diagonally NW/SE in the photo.

Site information
- Type: Army airfield
- Controlled by: United States Army Air Forces

Location
- Coordinates: 35°06′21″N 119°18′21″W

Site history
- Built: 1941
- In use: 1941–1945

Garrison information
- Garrison: Army Air Force Training Command

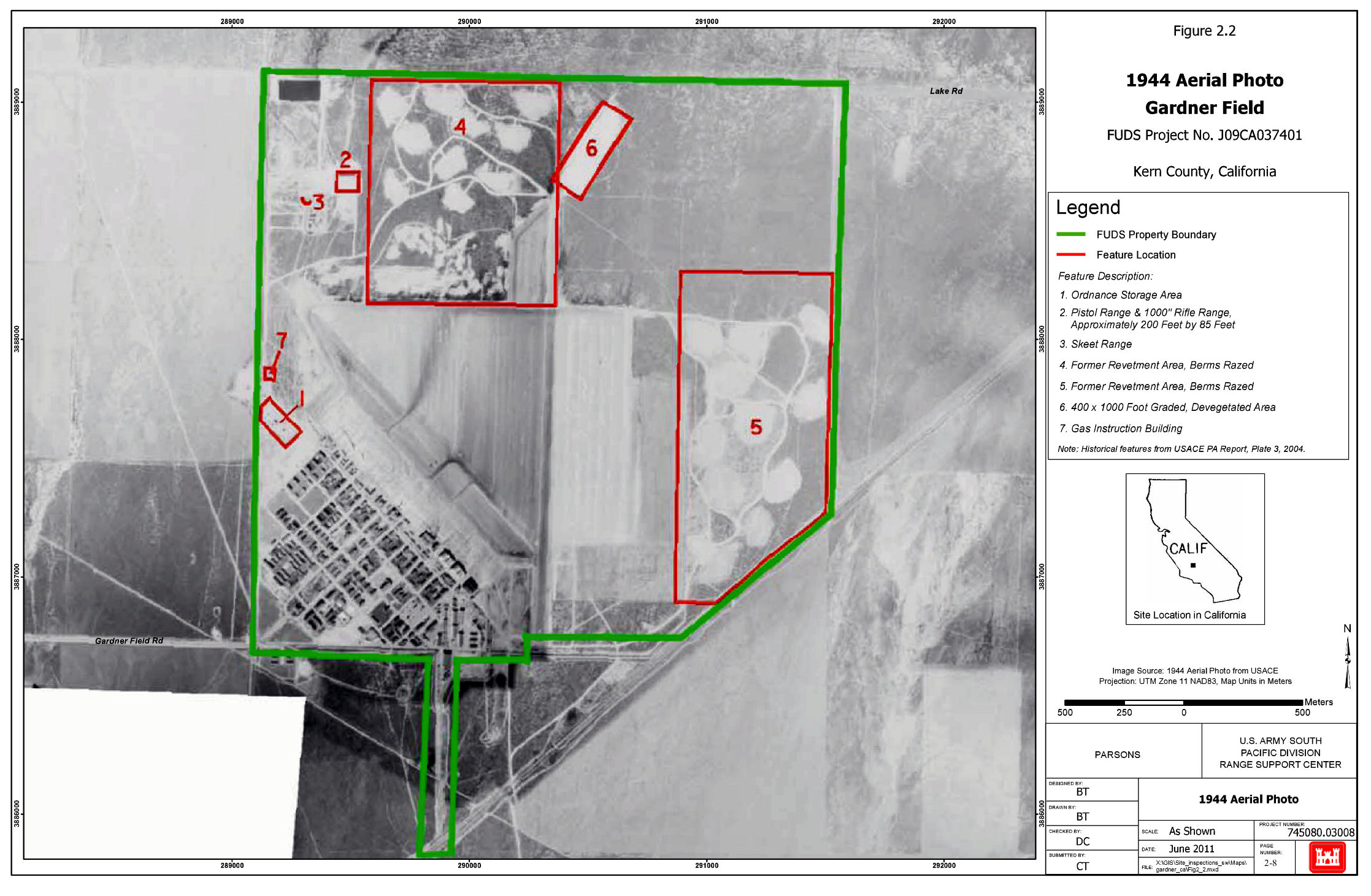
US Army COE FUDS map over 1944 airphoto

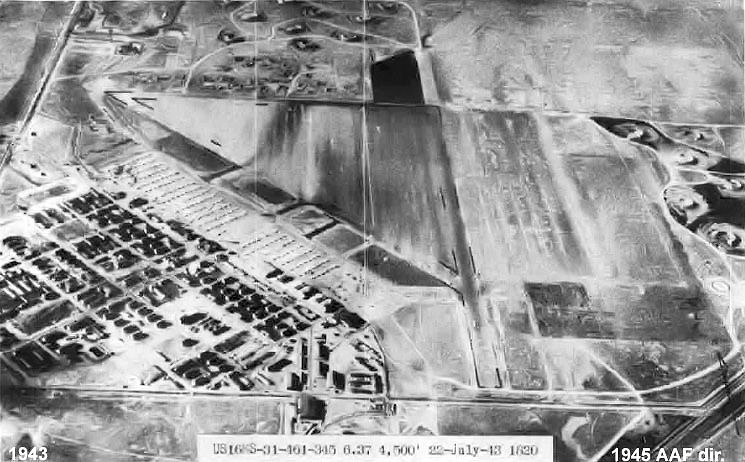
July 1943 oblique airphoto looking southward

World War II photo of Gardner Army Air Field showing flying cadets

Gardner Field 1943 classbook

Gardner Army Airfield is a former United States Army Air Force World War II Field located 9 miles southeast of Taft, California. It was named for Major John H. Gardner, a World War I aviator hero.

Gardner AAF is historically significant as Major General Charles Elwood "Chuck" Yeager first learned how to fly an airplane there.

== History ==
In 1940, prior to the entry of the United States into World War II, the Chief of the United States Army Air Corps directed the Western Flying Training Command to immediately take action to select air base sites needed to increase its pilot training rate to meet anticipated wartime demands.

Army Air Corps representatives came to Taft, California on 17 January 1941 to survey a site for a basic flying training school. An agricultural site was selected and acquisition began on 24 January 1941, with a lease of 880 acres from Kern County, followed by five additional transactions (that included declarations of taking and leases). With the final lease transaction on 12 May 1943, the total acreage acquired for Gardner Field was 1,396.36.

The immediate construction involved runways and airplane hangars, with concrete runways, several taxiways and a large parking apron and a control tower. The airfield had three asphalt runways laid out in a triangle pattern, 6000x150(N/S), 4574x150(E/W), 5001x150(NW/SE)

A large aircraft parking apron and several large hangars were also constructed. Buildings were ultimately utilitarian and quickly assembled. Most base buildings, not meant for long-term use, were constructed of temporary or semi-permanent materials. Although some hangars had steel frames and the occasional brick or tile building could be seen, most support buildings sat on concrete foundations but were of frame construction clad in little more than plywood and tarpaper. The base had its own hospital, 40-acre sewage plant, 9 administration buildings, 4 mess halls, supply rooms, officers' quarters, a guardhouse, a chapel, and 37 barracks.

In addition to the main base and airfield, six auxiliary fields were also constructed in the area:

- Parker Field (Aux#1) 35°03′50″N 119°12′15″W
- Kern Field Aux#2) 35°03′50″N 119°05′40″W
- Allen Field (Aux#3) 35°03′16″N 119°01′05″W
- Conners Field (Aux #4) 35°03′47″N 119°05′40″W
- Taft Field (Aux#5) 35°07′10″N 119°20′10″W
- Cuyama Field (Aux#6) 34°51′15″N 119°28′45″W

The area around Taft, California is very agricultural in use, and as a result no trace remains of any of these former satellite airfields in 2011.

Named "Gardner Army Airfield" by the War Department, the 528th School Squadron was transferred to the new training base on 2 June and the field was activated. Construction was rapid and the basic facilities were completed on 21 July 1941. Gardner Field was officially dedicated on 26 October 1941, with a gala affair attended by more than 10,000 people. The base operated Vultee BT-13 and Boeing-Stearman Model 75 PT-17 aircraft for primary training. Known USAAF units at Gardner Field were:

- Hq, Air Corps Basic Flying School
- 328th School Squadron
- 329th School Squadron
- 545th School Squadron

The 37th and last class at Gardner graduated in January 1945, by which point the base had trained a total of 3,050 soldiers and 8,916 cadets. Twenty-six cadets died in training flights, as did 11 of the training officers sharing cockpits with them. Still, the number of crashes in relation to the hours flown out of Gardner Field was low.

Gradually, the planes left, the buildings were removed, and Gardner AAF was inactivated 28 February 1945. Gardner Field and its auxiliary fields were transferred from the Western Flying Training Command to the jurisdiction of the Air Technical Service Command on 3 March 1945. They were subsequently placed on inactive status on 10 March 1945.

The War Department declared Gardner Field surplus on 27 October 1947. The 446.97 fee-owned acres were assigned to the Farm Credit Administration on 14 June 1948. It is surmised that the 949.39 acres originally leased reverted to the respective owners upon expiration of the leases.

Today, only the remnants of the sewage treatment plant and the parking apron remain, which now stages agricultural equipment.

== Postwar use ==
After the war Gardner was declared surplus and was closed as an active military installation. It was operated as Gardner Airport for some years afterwards, but evidently closed at some point between 1949 and 1964.

There is also a monument located at the site of the base's former entrance, at the intersection of Cadet and Basic School Roads.

== See also ==
- California World War II Army Airfields
- 35th Flying Training Wing (World War II)
