= Wasco Airport =

Wasco Airport Wasco-Kern County Airport
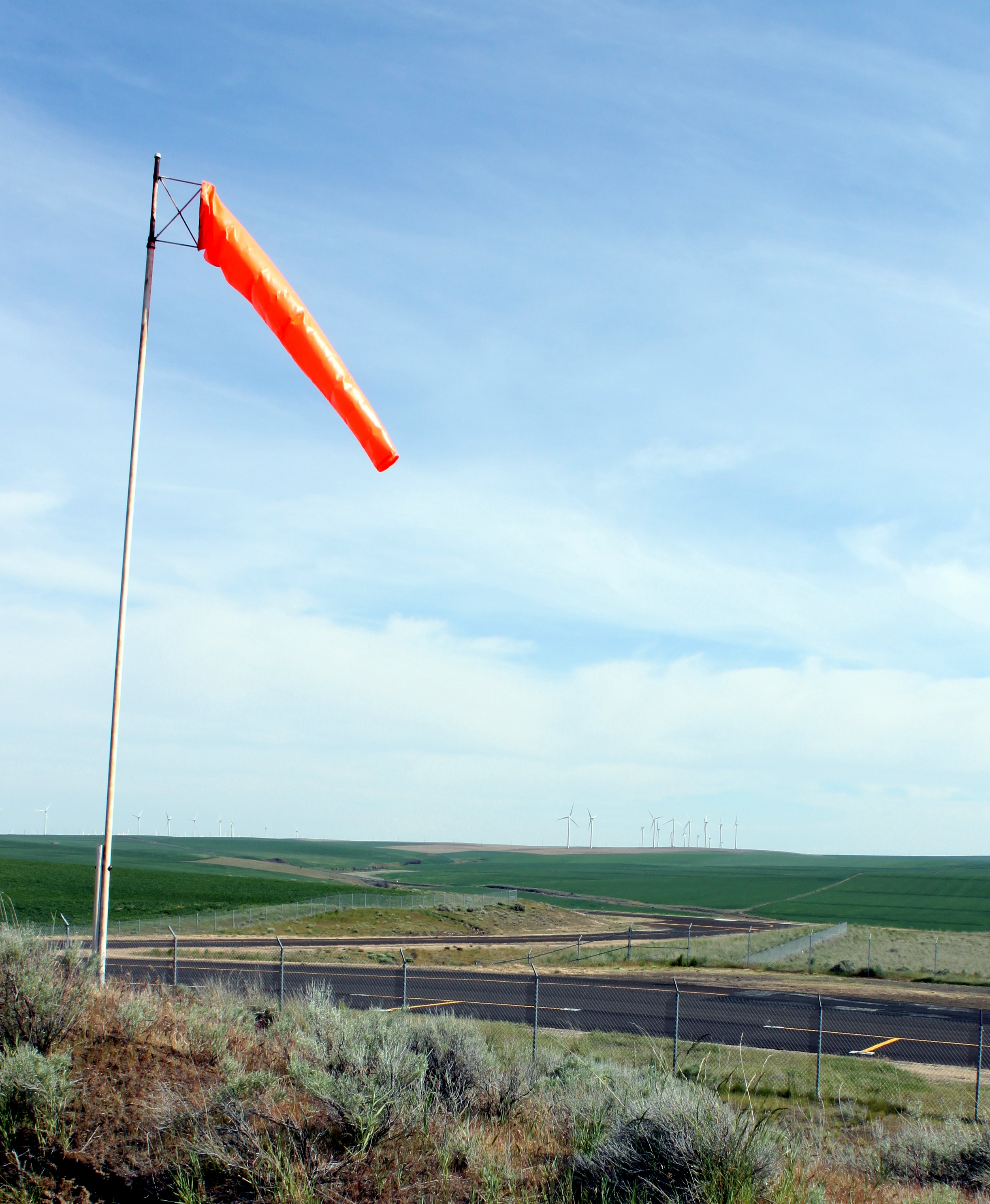
- Taxiway at Wasco State Airport
- IATA: none; ICAO: none; FAA LID: L19

Summary
- Airport type: Public
- Operator: Kern County
- Location: Wasco, California
- Elevation AMSL: 313 ft / 95.4 m
- Coordinates: 35°37′11″N 119°21′13″W
- Interactive map of Wasco Airport

Runways
Direction	Length		Surface
Direction	ft	m	Surface
12/30	3,380	1,030	Asphalt

Wasco Airport (FAA LID: L19), also known as Wasco-Kern County Airport, is a public airport located two miles (3.2 km) northwest of Wasco, serving Kern County, California, USA. This general aviation airport covers 158 acres (64 ha) and has one runway.

== History ==
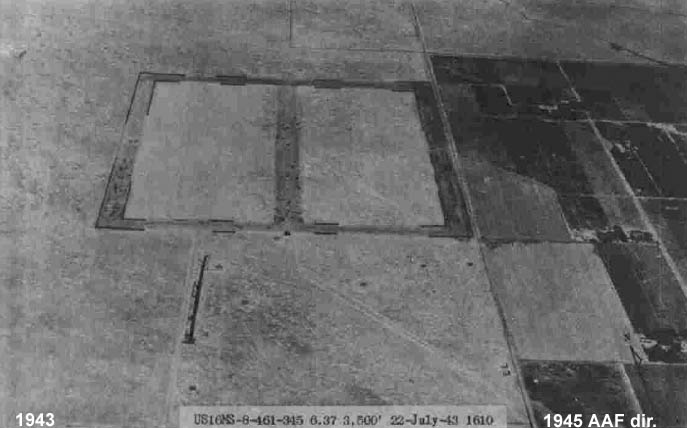
Wasco Auxiliary Field in 1945

Wasco Auxiliary Field or Wasco Field No. 1 was a satellite airfield of Minter Field, built for World War II pilot training. The Vultee BT-13 Valiant and Boeing-Stearman Model 75 were the most common plane used for training at Wasco Auxiliary Field and the Minter Army Airfields. The US Army leased the small 1932 40 acres Wasco Airport and 120 acres north of the airport from Kern County on June 16, 1941. Minter Field was 12 miles to the southeast of Wasco Field. The Army built a 5 runway landing mat on the site, with no other improvements. In 1944 Pond Field was closed and the lease ended on June 30, 1951. The Wasco Auxiliary Field became the Wasco-Kern County Airport.

== See also ==
- List of airports in Kern County, California
- California during World War II
- American Theater (1939–1945)
- Military history of the United States during World War II
- United States home front during World War II
