= Gardner Army Airfield auxiliary fields =

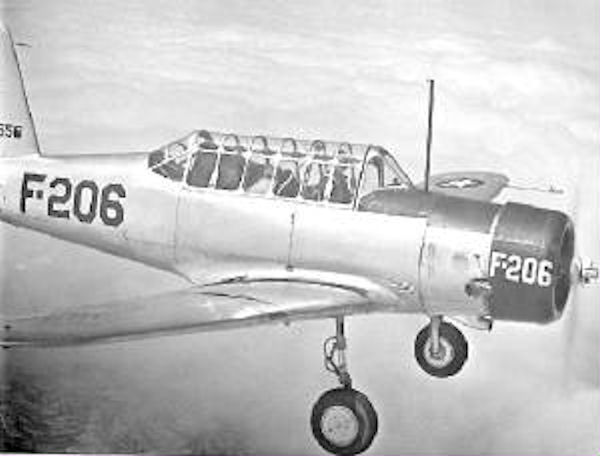
Vultee BT-13 Valiant F206 at Gardner Field

Gardner Army Airfield auxiliary fields were a number of airfields used during World War II to support the Gardner Army Airfield. May 12, 1943 the US Army leased 1,396.36 acres for Gardner Field, located 9 miles southeast of Taft, California. Gardner Army Airfield was named after Major John H. Gardner, a World War I aviator hero. The Army built three runways to support training activities need for World War II. From Gardner Army Airfield the United States Army Air Corps's Western Flying Training Command started training the needed pilots. To support the training of the many pilots, Gardner Army Airfield operated a number of auxiliary airfields. Some auxiliary fields were no more than a landing strip, others were other operation airfield that supported the training at the Gardner Army Airfield. The Vultee BT-13 Valiant and Boeing-Stearman Model 75 were the most common planes used for training at Gardner Army Airfields, but large bombers were trained also. Gardner Army Airfield auxiliary fields were:

== Parker Field ==
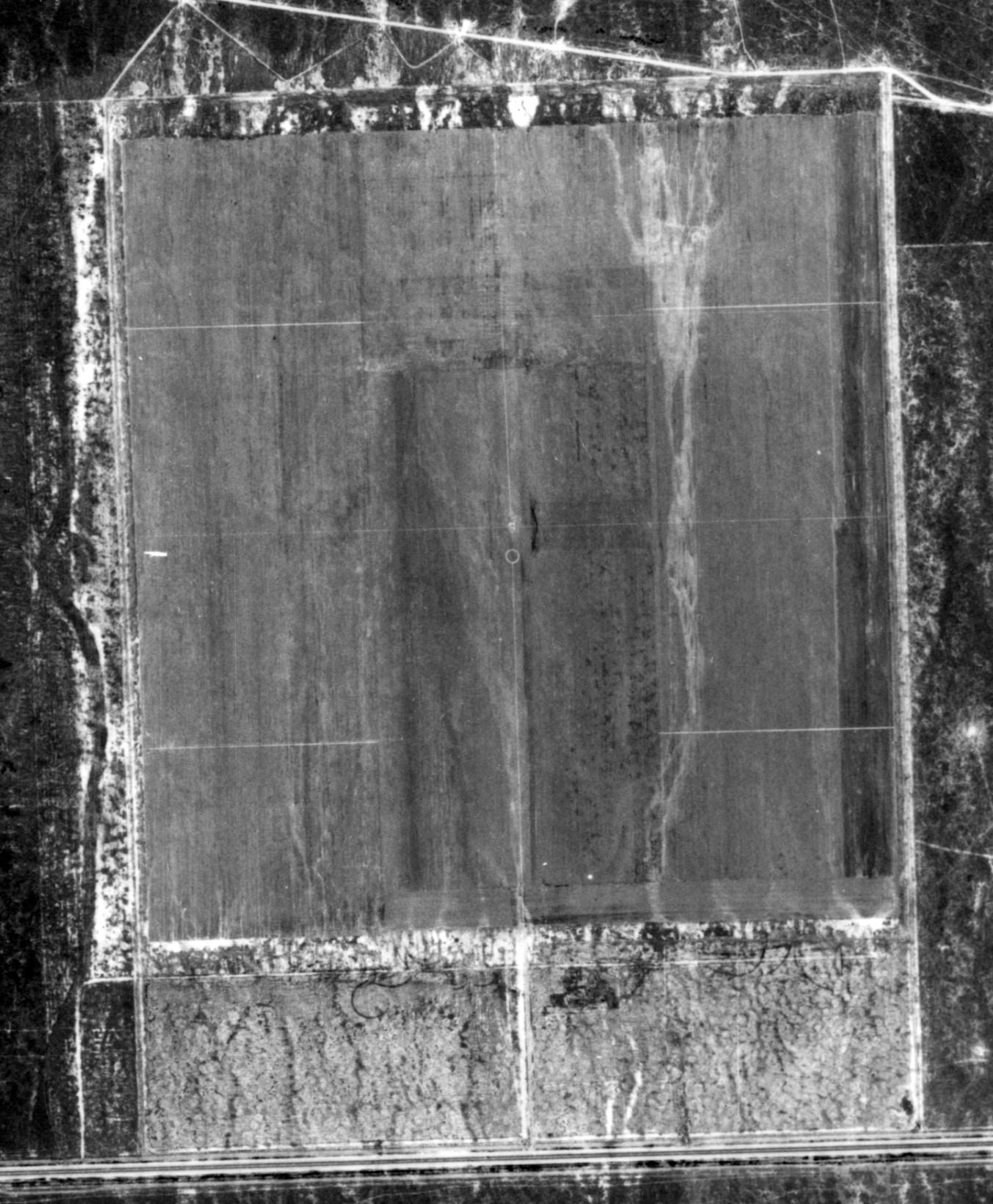
Parker Field in a 1946 USGS photo, shortly after it closed

Parker Field or Parker Field Aux No. 1 was located near Lakeview, California and Taft, California at 35°03′50″N 119°12′15″W, in Kern County. Parker Field was 6 miles southeast of Gardner Army Airfield and 22 miles southwest of Bakersfield, California. In 1941 the Army leased the 300-acre land from the County and built a 3,000' square asphalt landing mat, so planes could land in almost any direction. Parker Field had few improvement and was mostly used for training in landing and take off. The Parker Field was closed on March 10, 1945. Parker Field was just north of what is now California State Route 166, the site is now back to farmland and no trace remains of the airfield.

== Kern Field ==
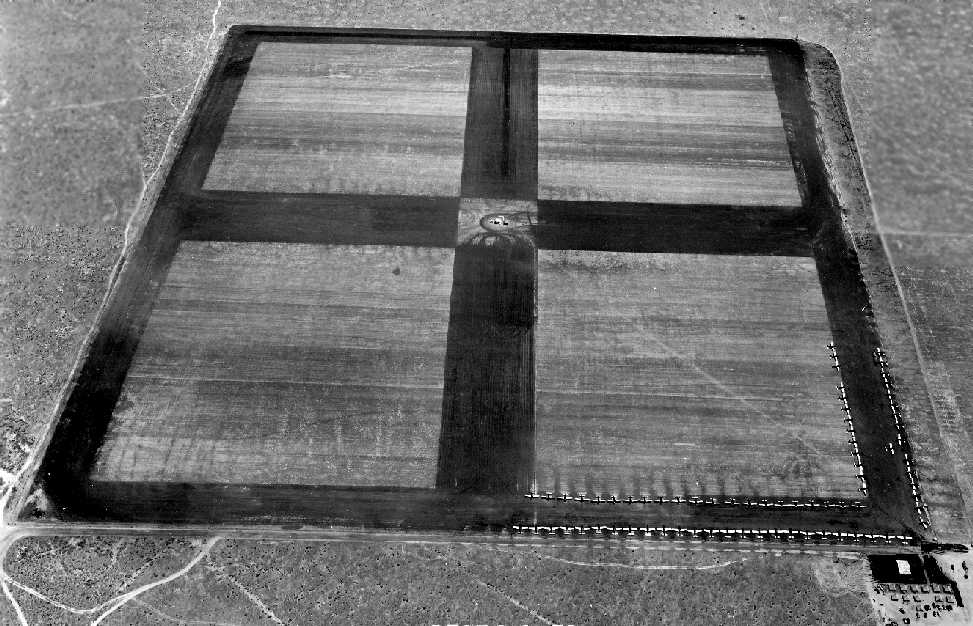
Kern Field in 1941, with 75 Army aircraft parked

Kern Field or Taft-Kern Field Auxiliary Field No. 2 or Taft-Kern Field Auxiliary Field No. 2 at 35°03′50″N 119°05′40″W with an elevation of 444 feet. Kern Field was 25 miles south of Bakersfield and 10.6 nautical miles east of Gardner Army Airfield. In 1941 the US Army built on the 250-acre site a landing mat that was 3,000 feet by 3,000. The Army built two runways in a unique cross shaped. Taft Field had many improvements and was used often for training in landing and take off. Kern Field closed on February 28, 1945. Kern Field was just north of what is now California State Route 166 and west of the Interstate 5 in Lakeview, California. The site is now back to farmland and no trace remains of the airfield.

== Allen Field ==
Allen Field or Allen Field Aux No. 3 was located near Lakeview, California and 6 miles west of Mettler, California at 35°03′16″N 119°01′05″W, in Kern County. Parker Field was 14 miles southeast of Gardner Army Airfield and 26 miles south of Bakersfield, California. In 1941 the Army leased the 260-acre land from the County and built a 3,000' square asphalt landing mat. Parker Field had few improvement and was mostly used for training in landing and take off. The Parker Field was closed on March 10, 1945. Parker Field was just south of what is now California State Route 166 and just west of the Interstate 5, the site is now back to farmland and no trace remains of the airfield.

== Conners Field ==
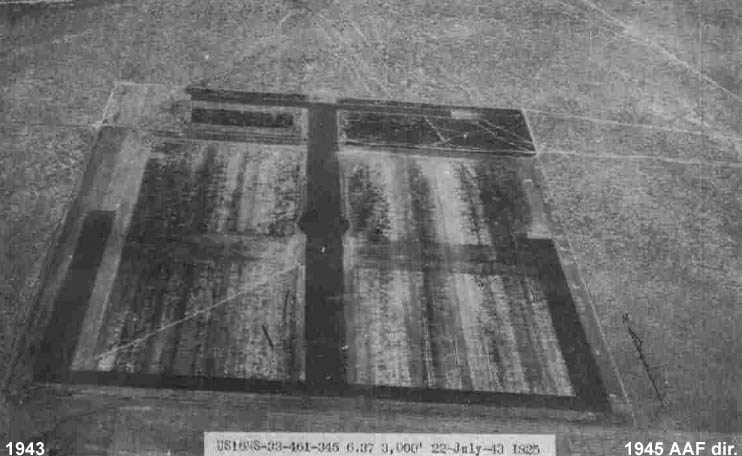
Conners Field in 1945

Conners Field or Conners Field Aux No. 4 was located 20 miles east of the City of Taft in Kern County at 35°11′00″N 119°05′30″W. Conners Field was 20 miles northeast of Gardner Army Airfield and 20 miles south of Bakersfield. In 1941 the Army leased the 250-acre land from the County and built a 3,000-foot-square asphalt landing mat, so planes could land in almost any direction. Conners Field had few improvements and was mostly used for training in landing and take off. The Parker Field was closed in October 1950. Conners Field was just south of what is now California State Route 223 and east of Interstate 5. The site is now back to farmland and no trace remains of the airfield.

== Taft Field ==
Taft Field or Taft Field Aux No. 5 or Taft-Kern Field was 5 miles east of the city of Taft, California and 16.5 miles east of Maricopa, California at 35°07′00″N 119°20′15″W in Kern County. Taft Field was 2 miles northwest of Gardner Army Airfield and 20 miles southwest of Bakersfield. In 1941 the Army acquired the 250-acre land from the private parties. The Taft Field was closed on 27 September 1945. Taft Field was east of what is now California State Route 33 and north of California State Route 166, the site is now back to farmland and a faint trace of the outline of the airfield remains.

== Cuyama Field ==
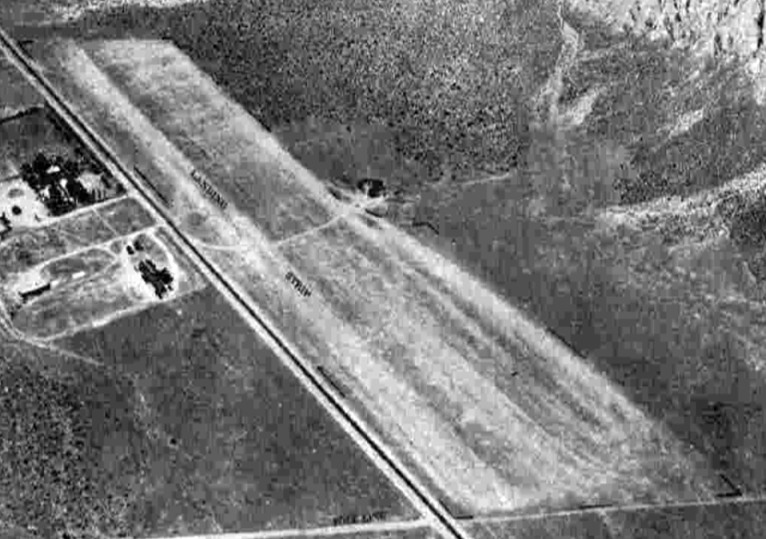
Cuyama Field Aux No. 6 in 1943, bomber training runway

Cuyama Field Cuyama Field Aux No. 6 was 1.6 miles northwest of Ventucopa, California an 14 miles southeast of New Cuyama, California in the Cuyama Valley at 34°51′15″N 119°28′45″W in Santa Barbara. Cuyama Field was 14 miles northwest of Gardner Army Airfield and 50 miles southwest of Bakersfield, California. In 1941 the Army received a permit for the 48-acre land from the U.S. Forest Service and built a 4,5000-foot northwest/southeast asphalt runway at an elevation of 2749 feet. Cuyama Field had no improvements and was for bombers to train in landing and take off. The Cuyama Field was closed on 30 November 1946 and returned to the U.S. Forest Service. Parker Field was just east of what is now California State Route 33 and 6 miles south of the California State Route 166, the site is now farmland and no trace remains of the runway.

== See also ==
- California World War II Army Airfields
- California during World War II
- American Theater (1939–1945)
- Desert Training Center
- Military history of the United States during World War II
- United States home front during World War II
- Minter Army Airfield auxiliary fields
- Chico Army Airfield auxiliary fields
