= Lost Hills Airport =

Airport in Kern County, California, US

Lost Hills Airport Lost Hills-Kern County Airport
- IATA: none; ICAO: none; FAA LID: ~~L84~~

Summary
- Airport type: Public
- Operator: Kern County
- Location: Lost Hills, California
- Elevation AMSL: 274 ft (84 m)
- Coordinates: 35°37′25″N 119°41′10″W
- Interactive map of Lost Hills Airport

Runways
Direction	Length		Surface
Direction	ft	m	Surface
~~15/33~~	3,020	920	Asphalt

Lost Hills Airport (FAA LID: ~~L84~~), also known as Lost Hills-Kern County Airport, was a public airport located one mile (1.6 km) northeast of the central business district (CBD) of Lost Hills, in Kern County, California, United States. It was mostly used for general aviation. It was closed in March 2019.

== Facilities ==
Lost Hills Airport covered 390 acres (158 ha) and had one runway:

- Runway ~~15/33~~: 3,020 by 60 feet (920 by 18 m), surface: asphalt

== History ==
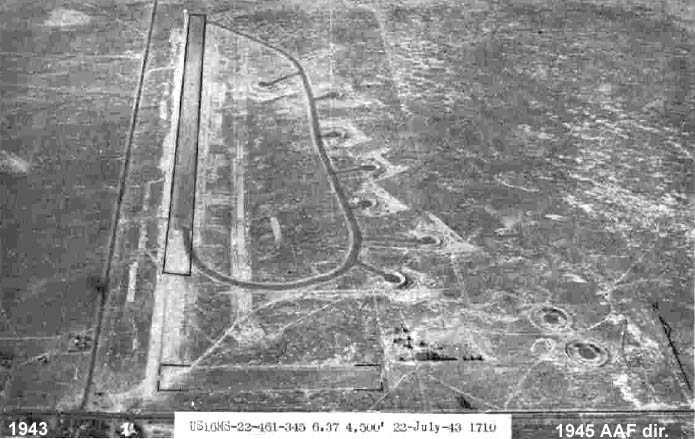
Lost Hills Auxiliary Field in 1945

The airport was built as the Lost Hills Auxiliary Field or Lost Hills Field No. 7, a satellite airfield of Minter Field, a US Army World War II pilot training base. In 1942 the War Department received the free use of land from Jean Atkinson on November 5, 1942. The US Army added 288.26 acres more of free land, received from Standard Oil Company of California on August 30, 1943. The Army built a 5,000-foot runway and a 1,600-foot clay landing strip at Lost Hills Auxiliary Field. The 5,000-foot runway was used for training bomber pilots like the North American B-25 Mitchell and Lockheed P-38 Lightning. The Vultee BT-13 Valiant and Boeing-Stearman Model 75 were the most common planes used for training at Minter Army Airfield auxiliary fields. Lost Hills Auxiliary Field was closed on January 11, 1945, and became the Lost Hills Airport, a public airport.

== See also ==
- List of airports in Kern County, California
- Minter Army Airfield auxiliary fields
- California World War II Army Airfields
- California during World War II
- American Theater (1939–1945)
- Military history of the United States during World War II
- United States home front during World War II
