= Wally Parks NHRA Nostalgia Nationals =

The Wally Parks NHRA Nostalgia Nationals, formerly known as the National Hot Rod Reunion, is a gathering of nostalgia drag racers, street rodders and automotive enthusiasts. It is run by the Wally Parks NHRA Motorsports Museum and based on the California Hot Rod Reunion. It includes nostalgia drag race events, a parade of street rods, vendors and a swap meet.

== History ==
The first four years of the National Hot Rod Reunion were held at Beech Bend in Bowling Green, Kentucky. The event has been held on the grounds of National Trail Raceway in Ohio, but has returned to Bowling Green as the main site since 2008.

== Organization ==
The event is organized by and benefits the Wally Parks NHRA Motorsports Museum, a non-profit organization affiliated with the National Hot Rod Association.
