= Poso Creek =

Stream in Kern County, California

Poso Creek Posey Creek
- Location of the mouth within California

Location
- Country: United States
- State: California
- District: Kern County

Physical characteristics
- Source: source
  - location: Confluence of Spear Creek and Von Hellem Creek on the west slope of the Greenhorn Mountains of the Sierra Nevada, Kern County
  - coordinates: 35°48′14″N 118°39′12″W
  - elevation: 4,300 ft (1,300 m)
- Mouth: mouth
  - location: Kern River south of Tulare Lake, Kern County
  - coordinates: 35°43′05″N 119°37′34″W
  - elevation: 223 ft (68 m)
- Length: 87.9 mi (141.5 km)
- Basin size: 575 sq mi (1,490 km^{2})

Poso Creek or Posey Creek is an 87.9-mile (141.5 km) intermittent stream in Kern County, California.

The headwaters of Poso Creek are located within the Sierra Nevada and the Sequoia National Forest, at elevations of up to 8,000 feet (2,400 m). The 50-foot (15 m) high Spear Creek Falls (often known as Poso Creek Falls) is located along a tributary of Poso Creek within the national forest. Poso Creek proper begins at the confluence of Spear Creek and Von Hellem Creek on the west slope of the Greenhorn Mountains. The upper reaches of the creek flow south through the Linn Valley past Posey and Glennville, then to Poso Flat, where it receives Cedar Creek and Little Poso Creek from the east. Below the confluence with Little Poso Creek, it turns west, passing through the Mount Poso and Poso Creek oil fields, which are a likely source of petroleum pollutants during flooding events.

Below the oil fields the creek emerges to the intensively farmed San Joaquin Valley, where it passes between Wasco and McFarland. The creek is crossed by Highway 99 and the Southern Pacific Railroad at Famoso and by the Friant-Kern Canal a few miles downstream. Most of the lower creek flows through artificial channels beginning north of Wasco. Its mouth is on the Kern River floodway in Kern National Wildlife Refuge, which connects the normally dry Buena Vista Lake with Tulare Lake.

As a primarily rain fed stream, Poso Creek flows only seasonally (November to May) in its upper reaches, while the lower part is an ephemeral wash. The United States Geological Survey operated a stream gage on Poso Creek from 1959 to 1985, recording an average annual flow of 39 cubic feet per second (1.1 m^{3}/s). The greatest flow was 6,700 cubic feet per second (190 m^{3}/s) on February 25, 1969, while the creek was dry for six straight months in 1977.

This creek is the type locality for the fish "Luxilis occidentalis" Baird & Girard, 1854, which is now known to be synonymous with Lavinia exilicauda.
