= Pozo, California =

Unincorporated community in California, United States

Pozo
- Unincorporated community
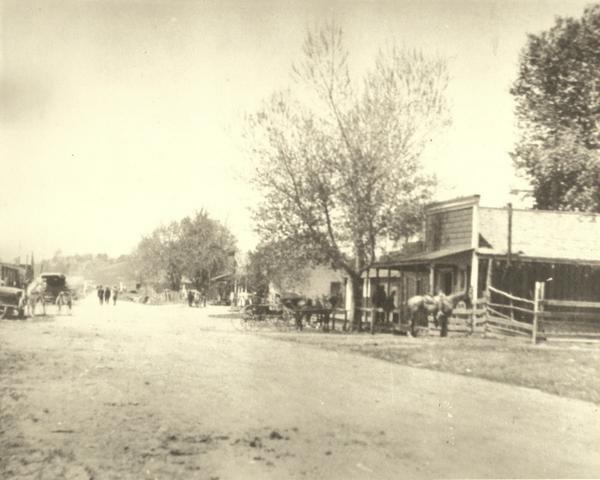
- Pozo in the 1870s. The Pozo Saloon is at right.

- Location within the state of California Pozo (the United States)
- Coordinates: 35°18′13″N 120°22′36″W
- Country: United States
- State: California
- County: San Luis Obispo
- Time zone: UTC-8 (Pacific (PST))
  - Summer (DST): UTC-7 (PDT)
- ZIP codes: 93453
- Area code: 805
- GNIS feature ID: 247764

Pozo (Spanish for "Well") is an unincorporated community, in San Luis Obispo County, California, United States. The closest communities appearing on road maps are California Valley and Santa Margarita. A USGS-provided set of coordinates for the town are on the Santa Margarita Lake 7.5-minute quadrangle.

Pozo was named by George Washington Lingo, Esq., "a well known citizen" who proposed the name for the post office because the village is in a holelike valley—pozo means "well" or "hole" in Spanish.

Pozo is home to the still thriving Pozo Saloon, established in 1858. During its early years, the Pozo Saloon was the primary watering hole for weary travelers making their way over Pozo Summit. Today it is a well-known live music venue, hosting internationally-known acts including Willie Nelson, Merle Haggard, and G Love and Special Sauce.

The ZIP Code is 93453. The community is served by area code 805.
