= Shafter Airport =

Airport in Kern County, California

Shafter Airport Minter Field
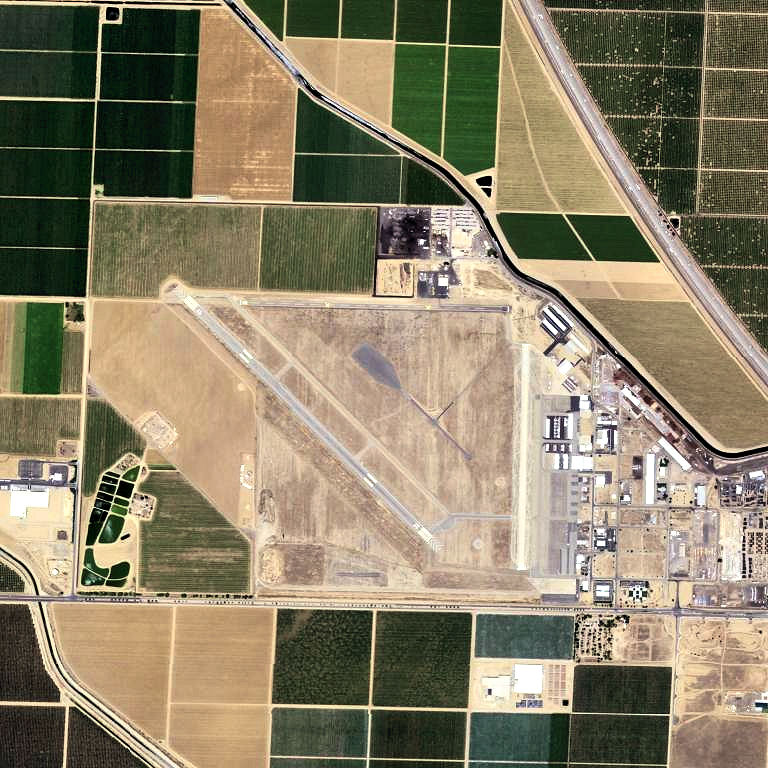
- USGS 2006 orthophoto
- IATA: MIT; ICAO: KMIT; FAA LID: MIT

Summary
- Airport type: Public
- Owner: Minter Field Airport District
- Serves: Shafter, California
- Elevation AMSL: 424 ft / 129 m
- Coordinates: 35°30′21″N 119°11′30″W
- Website: www.MinterField.com

Map
- Location of airport in California

Runways
Direction	Length		Surface
Direction	ft	m	Surface
12/30	4,501	1,372	Asphalt
17/35	2,970	905	Concrete

Statistics (2011)
- Aircraft operations: 45,000
- Based aircraft: 114
- Source: Federal Aviation Administration

Shafter Airport (IATA: MIT, ICAO: KMIT, FAA LID: MIT), also known as Minter Field and formerly known as Air Corps Basic Flying School, is a public use airport located four nautical miles (7.4 km; 4.6 mi) east of the central business district of Shafter and 14 miles northwest of Bakersfield, a city in Kern County, California, United States. Originally a World War II primary training facility for pilots, it is currently a public airport owned by the Minter Field Airport District. This airport is included in the National Plan of Integrated Airport Systems for 2011–2015, which categorized it as a general aviation facility.

== History ==
Minter Army Air Base 1943 Classbook

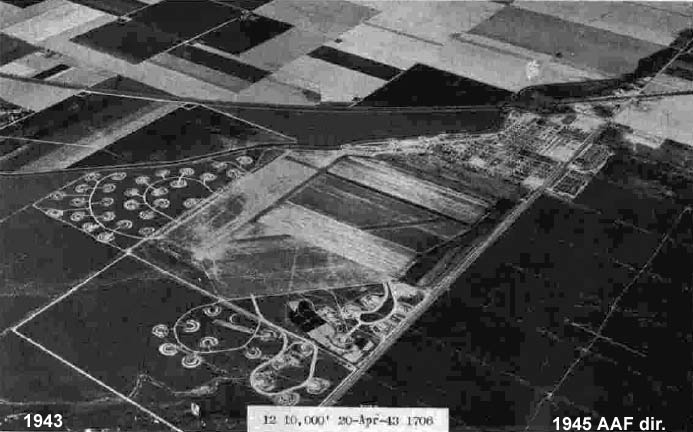
Minter Army Air Base in 1945

Lerdo Field, as the airport was initially known during World War II, was first opened in June 1941 when the United States Army Air Corps (USAAC) dispatched a small garrison of airmen to open an airfield at Shafter.

The name was derived from close proximity to the highway of the same name. The airfield commander utilized Bakersfield College as his headquarters, while airmen were quartered in temporary facilities from Bakersfield to Wasco while barracks and other structures were being built. As construction proceeded through the rest of the year, the Minter Sub-Depot was established as a branch of the Sacramento Air Depot.

In August, the first operational training units (OTUs) began arriving at Lerdo Field, the airfields mission being advanced pilot training of USAAC bomber, attack, transport and pursuit pilots. In April 1942, contracts for the construction of more than 65 on-base buildings were let, while the constantly increasing numbers of cadets were housed in a large tent city erected as temporary shelter.

With the relative completion of construction in July 1942, the airfield was renamed Minter Field Army Airfield after a member of the locally prominent Minter family, First Lieutenant Hugh C. Minter. Lieutenant Minter, a World War I veteran, was killed in a mid-air collision over March Field on July 8, 1932. The airfield was placed under the overall command of the United States Army Air Forces West Coast Training Center. Known sub-bases and auxiliaries of Minter Field were:

- Wasco Auxiliary Airfield (No.1) – 35°37′12″N 119°21′14″W now Wasco-Kern County Airport
- Pond Auxiliary Field (No. 2) – 35°42′36″N 119°20′59″W – abandoned
- Famoso Auxiliary Airfield (No.3) – 35°38′28″N 119°12′43″W – abandoned
- Dunlap Auxiliary Airfield (No.4) (AKA Jasmin Landing Field) – 35°44′37″N 119°08′37″W – abandoned
- Semi-tropic Auxiliary Airfield (No.5) – 35°45′25″N 119°30′45″W – abandoned
- Poso Auxiliary Airfield (No.6) – 35°35′48″N 119°08′01″W now Poso Airport
- Lost Hills Auxiliary Airfield (No.7) – 35°37′27″N 119°41′15″W now Lost Hills Airport
- Coalinga Municipal Airport (Old) (closed) – 36°09′27″N 120°21′35″W

The primary aircraft flown at Minter Field was the Vultee BT-13 Valiant, which was used for f flight training. Other training aircraft included the Cessna UC-78 Bobcat, AT-6 Texan advanced trainer, North American B-25 Mitchell twin-engine medium bomber, and Lockheed P-38 Lightning, as well as other widely used fighter, bomber and observation craft.

With the end of the war in 1945, the airfield was determined to be excess by the military and turned over to the local government for civil use in March 1948.

The Gossamer Condor piloted by Bryan Allen won the first Kremer prize on August 23, 1977, by completing a figure 8 course with two 10 foot high obstacles as specified by the Royal Aeronautical Society at Minter Field. This first successful human powered airplane was designed by Paul MacCready. California Historic Landmark #923 is located at the field to commemorate this event.

== Facilities and aircraft ==
Shafter-Minter Field covers an area of 1,206 acres (488 ha) at an elevation of 424 feet (129 m) above mean sea level. It has two runways: 12/30 is 4,501 by 100 feet (1,372 by 30 m) with an asphalt surface; 17/35 is 2,970 by 100 feet (905 by 30 m) with a concrete surface.

For the 12-month period ending November 1, 2011, the airport had 45,000 general aviation aircraft operations, an average of 123 per day. At that time there were 114 aircraft based at this airport: 77% single-engine, 8% helicopter, 7% ultralight, 4% jet, and 4% multi-engine.

== See also ==
- California World War II Army Airfields
- 35th Flying Training Wing (World War II)
- List of airports in Kern County, California

== Other sources ==
- Manning, Thomas A. (2005), History of Air Education and Training Command, 1942–2002. Office of History and Research, Headquarters, AETC, Randolph AFB, Texas OCLC 71006954, 29991467
- Shaw, Frederick J. (2004), Locating Air Force Base Sites, History’s Legacy, Air Force History and Museums Program, United States Air Force, Washington DC. OCLC 57007862, 1050653629
