= California Hot Rod Reunion =

California Hot Rod Reunion is a gathering of drag racers, hot rod enthusiasts and street rodders held in Bakersfield, California, United States.

The event was created by Steve Gibbs, vice-president of the National Hot Rod Association, in October 1992, as a one-time event to gather some of the old drag racers together. It has since become an annual event in early October at Auto Club Famoso Raceway outside Bakersfield.

The reunion has also spawned the National Hot Rod Reunion, held each year. Honorees are named at each year's reunion. The honorees are pioneers in the sport of drag racing and hot rodding.

The National Hot Rod Association was created in 1951 and has often organized several events related to hot rodding with some of these events being annual events.
