= Famoso, California =

Unincorporated community in California, United States

Famoso
- Unincorporated community
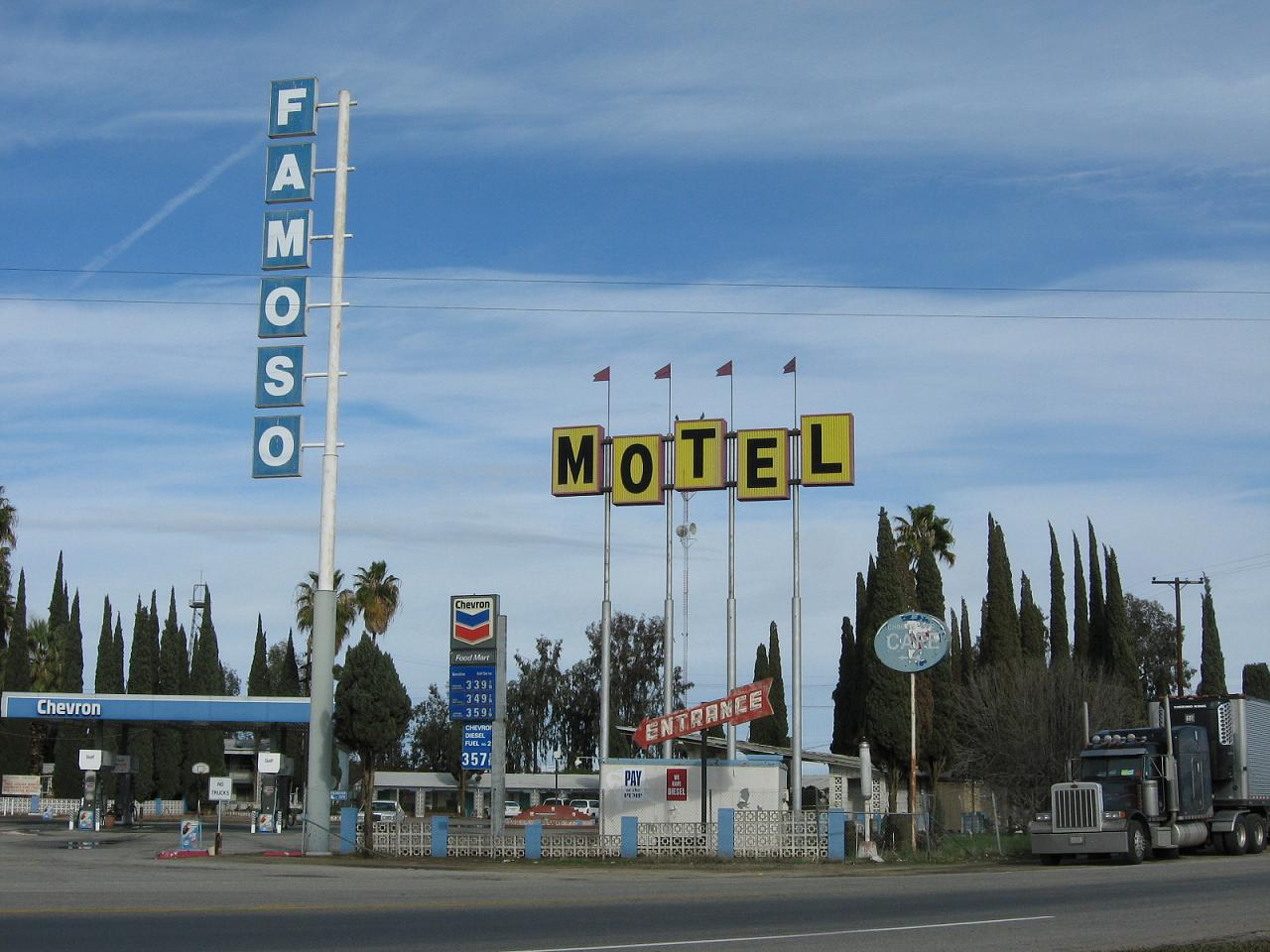
- Vintage sign collection in Famoso

- Location in California Famoso (the United States)
- Coordinates: 35°35′53″N 119°12′29″W
- Country: United States
- State: California
- County: Kern
- Elevation: 430 ft (130 m)

Famoso (Spanish for "Famous") is an unincorporated community in Kern County, California, United States. It is located on Poso Creek, 5.5 miles (8.9 km) south-southeast of McFarland, at an elevation of 427 feet (130 m). Famoso is located at the junction of State Route 99 and the eastern terminus of State Route 46. The town is famous for its nut groves and especially the race track - Auto Club Famoso Raceway (Famoso Raceway).

== History ==
The Spottiswood post office opened in 1888, changed its name to Famoso in 1895, closed for a period in 1919, moved in 1940, and closed for good in 1946. The name Poso was bestowed by the Southern Pacific Railroad when it reached the site in the 1870s. Famoso is a Spanish word meaning "famous" or "celebrated".

Early in its history, the city of Famoso was named Poso, California. This name conflicted with the community of Pozo along the Butterfield Overland Mail stagecoach route in San Luis Obispo County and officials in Washington renamed it Spottiswood. The residents later requested the name to be changed to Famoso, meaning "famous" in Spanish. The route of an early irrigation project, the Pozo Canal, is visible from aerial photos of this area. Poso Creek flows to the northwest, passing immediately north of town.

== Geography ==
The eastward continuation of SR 46, Famoso Woody Road, leads into the Sierra Nevada foothills, passing through the Mount Poso Oil Field on the way. The westward continuation leads to the city of Paso Robles, California in San Luis Obispo County.

The ZIP Code is 93250, and the community is served by area code 661.
