= Famoso Raceway =

Dragstrip in McFarland, California

Auto Club Famoso Raceway
"Famoso Raceway"
- Location: McFarland, California, United States
- Coordinates: 35.59815°N 119.13576°W
- Address: 33559 Famoso Road
- Major events: March Meet
- Website: www.famosoraceway.com

Drag Strip
- Length: 0.250 mi (0.402 km)

The Famoso Bakersfield Raceway is a dragstrip located in McFarland, California, United States, about 20 miles north of Bakersfield. It is known historically as the home to the annual March Meet, also known as the U.S. Fuel and Gas Championships.

The strip, located on Famoso Road between Highway 99 and Highway 65 east of Highway 99 and Highway 46 interchange, was originally built in World War II as an Poso Auxiliary Field training base for the nearby Army Air Corps training base at Shafter's Minter Field. After World War II, the Army abandoned the field. It was in the 1950s that an aspiring group of drag racing pioneers from the Bakersfield area, the Bakersfield Smokers, purchased the west of the strip and made the necessary adjustments to allow for drag racing. The Famoso Bakersfield Raceway hosted the first ever March Meet in 1959 and it helped establish the National Hot Rod Association's (NHRA) legitimacy. The east part of Poso Auxiliary Field became the Poso Airport.

The Famoso Bakersfield Raceway still hosts the March Meet but it is now strictly a "nostalgia drag racing" event. In the 2000s, "Saturday Nitro" events featured Fuel altereds then switched to nostalgic funny cars around 2010. After a driver died in an on-track hit on the guardrail, they stopped hosting these non-sanctioned events. The track also hosts A.N.R.A (American Nostalgia Racing Association) events and the annual NHRA Museum's California Hot Rod Reunion in October as well as a high school racing series and other smaller events. It is run by the Kern County Racing Association, Inc. with major sponsorship from the Automobile Club of Southern California, which also sponsors NASCAR and NHRA events and tracks throughout Southern California.
