= Vultee BT-13 Valiant =

US military trainer aircraft

BT-13 Valiant
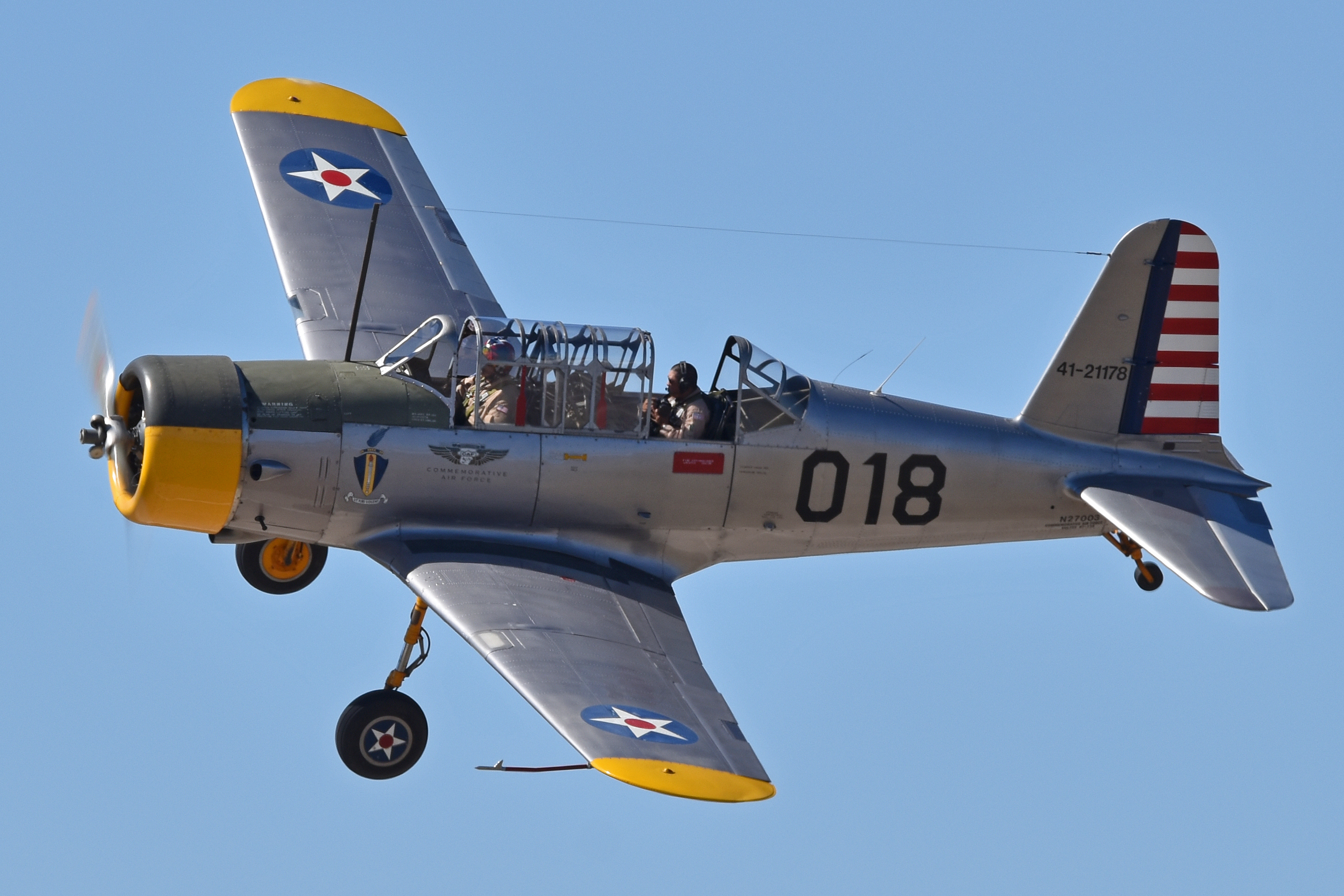
- A restored Vultee BT-13 over an Airshow in Dallas, 2019

General information
- Type: Trainer
- Manufacturer: Vultee Aircraft
- Primary users: United States Army Air Forces United States Navy
- Number built: 9,525

History
- Introduction date: June 1940
- First flight: March 1939

The Vultee BT-13 Valiant is an American World War II-era basic (a category between primary and advanced) trainer aircraft built by Vultee Aircraft for the United States Army Air Corps, and later US Army Air Forces. A subsequent variant of the BT-13 in USAAC/USAAF service was known as the BT-15 Valiant, while an identical version for the US Navy was known as the SNV and was used to train naval aviators for the US Navy and its sister services, the US Marine Corps and US Coast Guard.

== Design and development ==
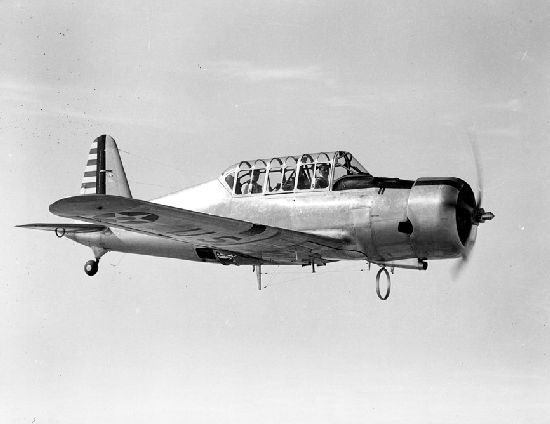
Vultee BC-3 prototype in flight

According to Jonathan Thompson, "The three trainer designs that shared their basic engineering with the Vanguard fighter were all promoted under the same name, Valiant. The prototypes had consecutive serial numbers 139, 140 and 141 and made their first flights in the Spring and Summer of 1939. While similar in appearance, they were distinct in purpose and performance, and only one of them succeeded in winning a production contract. This turned out to be six AC contracts with three supplements, eventually amounting to 11,526 aircraft, plus twelve ordered by Peru, for a total of 11,538."

On 24 March, the Vultee BC-51 advanced trainer first flew, but lost out in competition to the North American AT-6. The Air Corps did accept the Vultee BC-51 though, designating it as the BC-3 after some upgrades in the Spring of 1940. On 9 June, Vultee model 54 advanced trainer first flew. Its original 450-hp Wright Whirlwind was eventually replaced with a R-1340. On 28 July, the Vultee model 54A first flew. According to Thompson, "A Basic Trainer, similar to the model 54 except for its fixed landing gear and P&W R-985 engine, it struck pay dirt. In August the USAAC selected it for volume production as the BT-13. which became the standard type for the category throughout World War II."

The Vultee BT-13 was the basic trainer flown by most American pilots during World War II. It was the second phase of the three phase training program for pilots. After primary training in PT-13, PT-17, or PT-19 trainers, the student pilot moved to the more complex Vultee for continued flight training. The BT-13 had a more powerful engine and was faster and heavier than the primary trainer. It required the student pilot to use two way radio communications with the ground and to operate landing flaps and a two-position Hamilton Standard controllable-pitch propeller (or, more commonly, a constant-speed propeller).

The BT-13A dispensed with the landing gear fairings. Due to the demand for this aircraft, and others which used the same Pratt & Whitney engine, some were equipped with Wright powerplants of similar size and power built in 1941–42. The Wright-equipped aircraft were designated BT-15. The BT-15B had a 24-volt electrical system.

The Navy adopted the P&W powered aircraft as their main basic trainer, designating it the SNV. The BT-13 production run outnumbered all other Basic Trainer (BT) types produced.

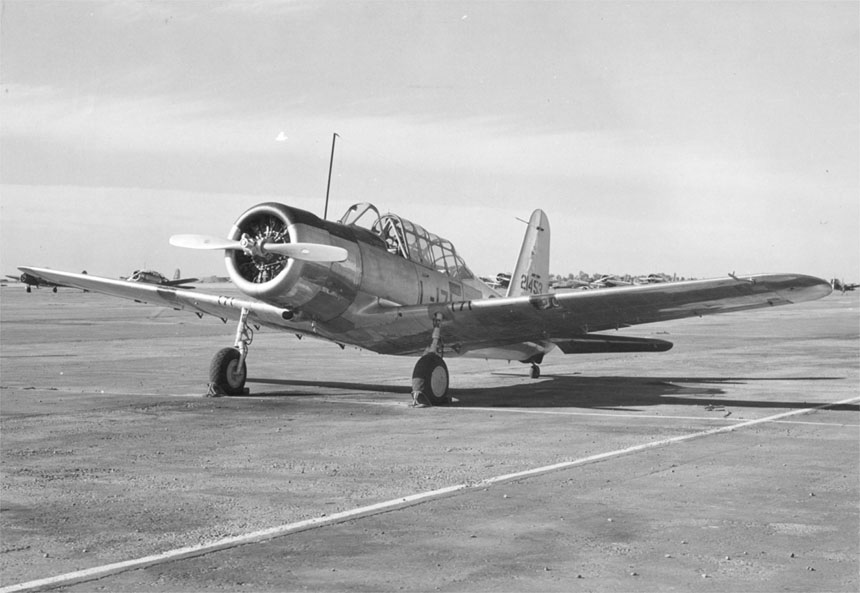
Vultee BT-13 on runway at Minter Field, California, 1 March 1943

According to Thompson, "Because of Vultee's outstanding production achievement, as well as the service's accelerated training programs, the huge pilot requirements were met by mid-1943 and the last Valiants were built in mid-1944. Except for resonances in various flight modes that earned it the nickname 'Vibrator,' the Valiant's simplicity and effectiveness caused it to be taken for granted, and practically forgotten after all of them were sold at war's end."

The BT-13 was not without its faults. Some had been built with plywood tailcones and empennages, which did not always remain firmly aligned with the aircraft.

Thompson states, "Most of the 5137 Valiants sold in the United States by the War Assets Administration, Reconstruction Finance Corporation and other agencies went for $450, a mere $1/hp, to cropdusters who wanted only the R-985 and R-975 engines."

== Operational Use ==
A message from G-3 Section, Headquarters I Corps dated 26 March 1945 reads:

EFFECTIVE 25 MARCH THERE WILL BE BT-13 TYPE AIRCRAFT FLYING IN THE PHILIPPINE ISLAND AREAS. THIS AIRCRAFT RESEMBLES THE NIP VAL. IT IS A TWO PLACE, LOW WINGED MONOPLANE WITH FIXED LANDING GEAR, A LONG TAPERING CANOPY, AND A HIGH TAIL. THESE AIRCRAFT ARE EQUIPPED WITH IFF. THOROUGH BRIEFING OF ALL RPT ALL AIR CREWS AND ACK ACK GUNNERS AND GROUND PERSONNEL IS IMPERATIVE.

The "Nip Val" refers to the Aichi D3A. IFF refers to Identification Friend or Foe technology. Although it is not stated, it is possible these aircraft were being used for reconnaissance.

== Variants ==
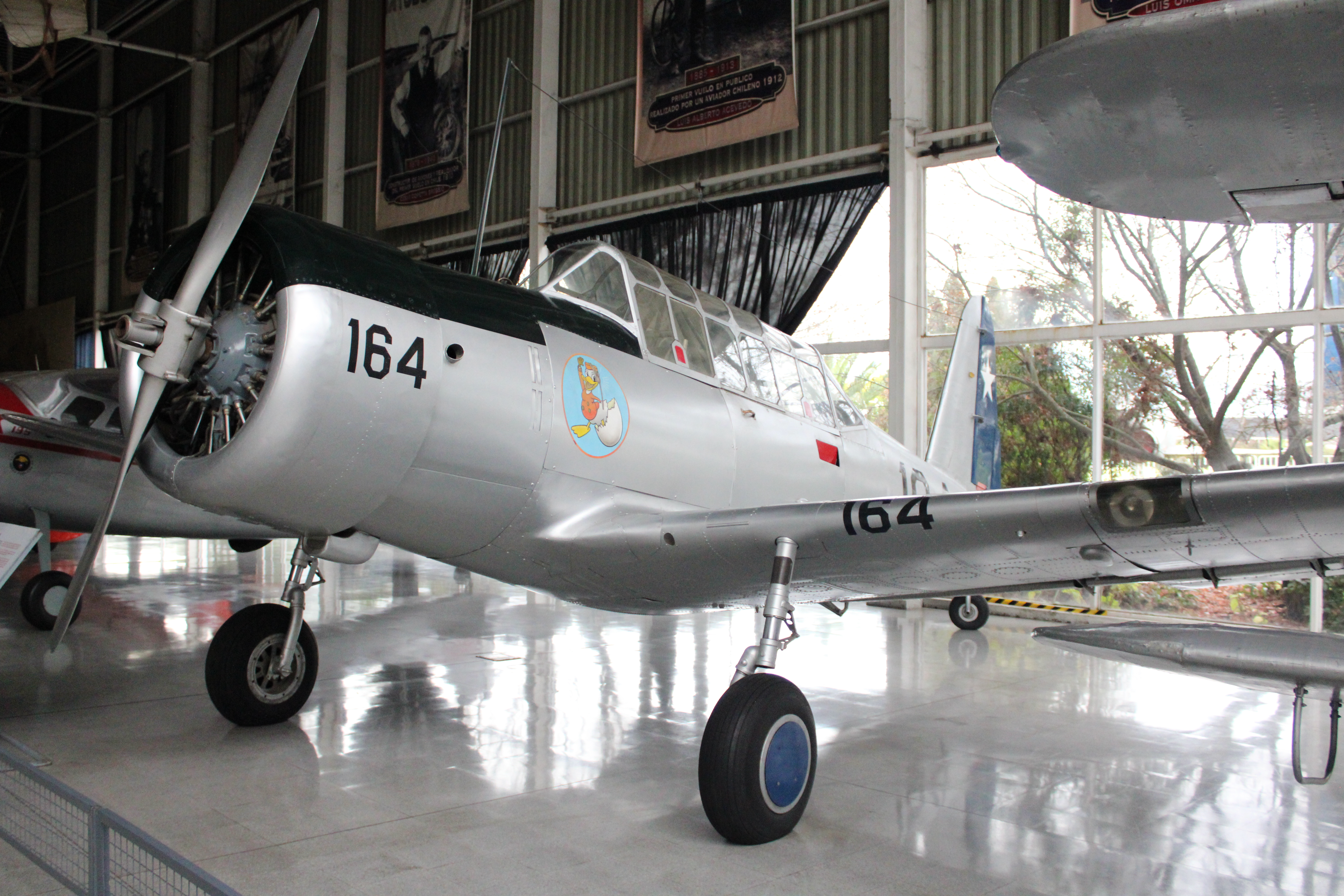
BT-13B

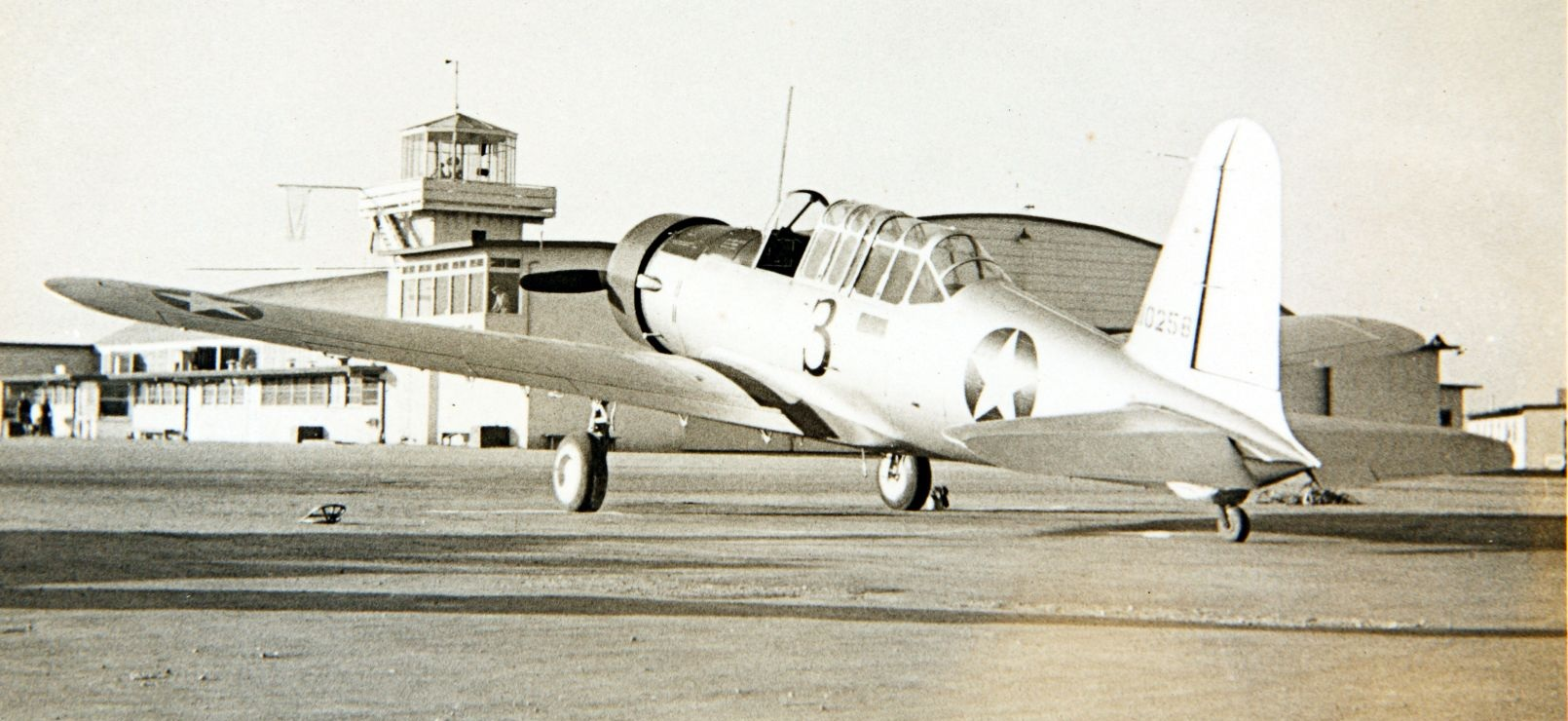
BT-15

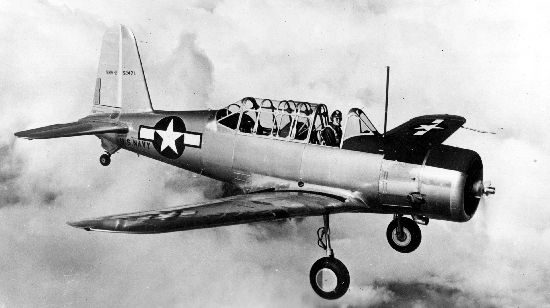
SNV-2

BC-3
Vultee Model V.51 with retractable landing gear and a 600hp P&W R-1340-45, one built, not developed.
BT-13
Vultee Model V.54 with fixed undercarriage and a 450hp P&W R-985-25 engine, 300 built.
BT-13A
As BT-13 but fitted with a 450hp R-985-AN-1 engine and minor changes, 6407 built, survivors re-designated T-13A in 1948.
BT-13B
As BT-13A but with a 24-volt electrical system, 1125 built.
BT-15
As BT-13A with a 450hp Wright R-975-11 engine, 1693 built.
XBT-16
One BT-13A was re-built in 1942 by Vidal with an all-plastic fuselage as the XBT-16.
SNV-1
BT-13As for the United States Navy, 1350 transferred from United States Army Air Corps.
SNV-2
BT-13Bs for the United States Navy, 650 transferred from United States Army Air Corps.
T-13A
Surviving BT-13As were re-designated in 1948, due to dual allocation of T-13 with the PT-13 in practice they were still known as the BT-13 to avoid confusion.

== Operators ==
Argentina

- Argentine Air Force
- Argentine Navy

Bolivia

- Bolivian Air Force (37 BT-13 between 1942 and 1958)

Brazil

- Brazilian Air Force (120 BT-15s)

Chile

- Chilean Air Force

China
Colombia

- Colombian Air Force (Fourteen BT-15s)

China
Cuba

- Cuban Air Force

Dominican Republic

- Dominican Air Force

Ecuador

- Ecuadorian Air Force

Egypt
El Salvador

- Salvadoran Air Force

France

- French Air Force

Guatemala

- Guatemalan Air Force

Haiti

- Haiti Air Corps

Honduras

- Honduran Air Force

Indonesia

- Indonesian Air Force

Israel

- Israeli Air Force

Mexico
Nicaragua

- Nicaraguan Air Force

Panama
Paraguay

- Paraguayan Air Arm 10 BT-13A received through Lend-Lease 1942–1943. Two BT-13 bought in Argentina in 1947.
- Paraguayan Naval Aviation Three BT-13 donated by Argentina in the 1960s.

Peru

- Peruvian Air Force

Philippines
Soviet Union

- Soviet Air Force

United States

- United States Air Force
- United States Army Air Forces
- United States Navy

Venezuela

- Venezuelan Air Force
- Centro de Instruccion Aeronautica Civil

== Surviving aircraft ==
Australia

- 41-23063 – BT-13A airworthy with John Kempton in Albury, New South Wales.

Brazil

- 1072 – BT-15 on static display at the Museu Aeroespacial in Rio de Janeiro, Rio de Janeiro.
- 42-1216 – BT-13A on display at the Museu Aeroespacial Paulista, Campo de Marte Airport, São Paulo.

Canada

- 42-89379 – BT-13A airworthy in Edenvale, Ontario.

Indonesia

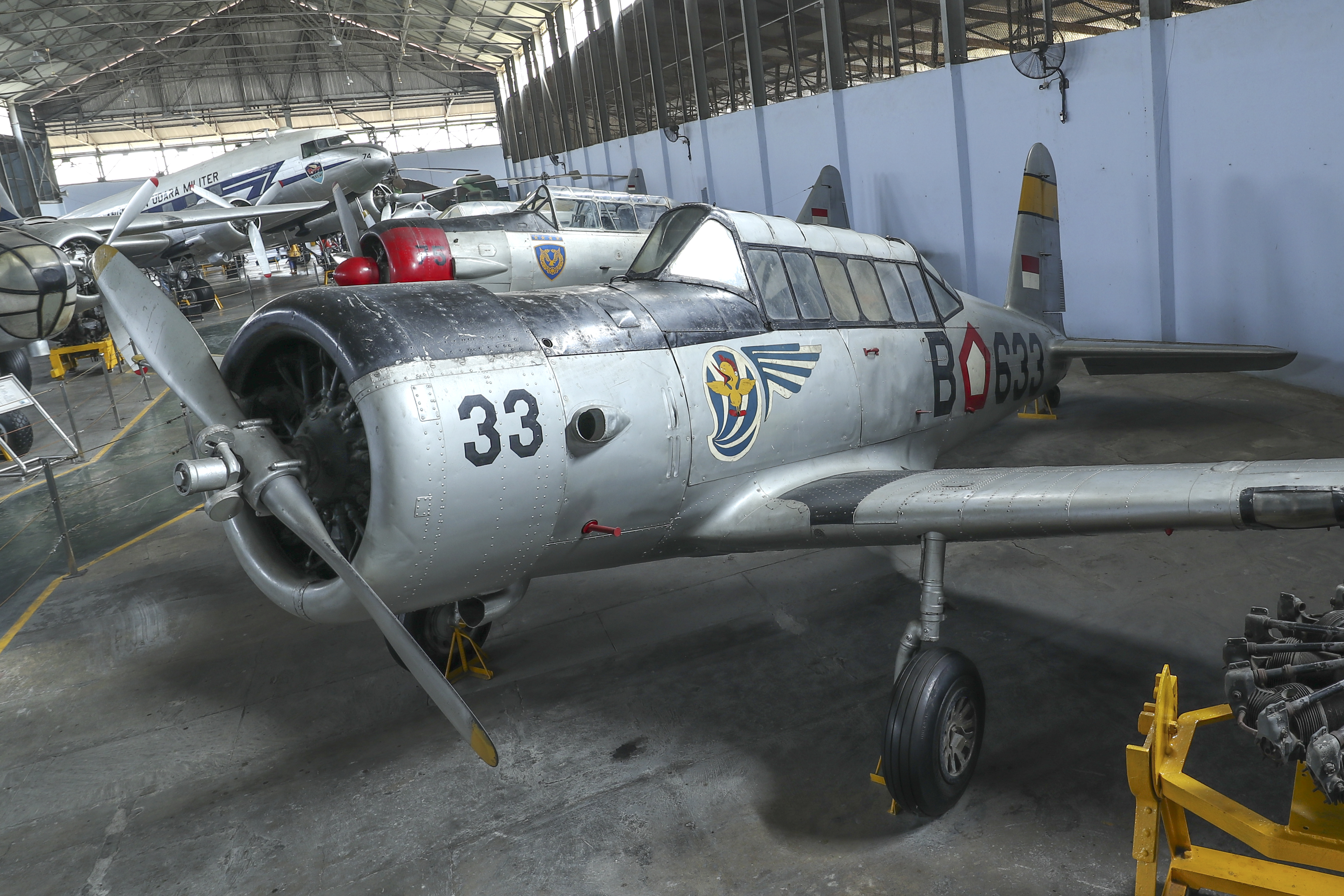
Indonesian Air Force BT-13A Valiant at the Dirgantara Mandala Museum

- B-427 – BT-13A on display at Ngurah Rai International Airport in Denpasar, Bali.
- B-604 – BT-13A on display at Suryadarma Air Force Base in Kalijati, Subang Regency, West Java.
- B-605 – BT-13A on display at Gembira Loka Zoo in Yogyakarta.
- B-608 – BT-13A on display at Jurug Solo Zoo in Surakarta, Central Java.
- B-610 – BT-13A on display at Gedung Juang 45 Subang in Subang Regency, West Java.
- B-616 – BT-13A on display at Indonesian Air Force Academy in Yogyakarta.
- B-620 – BT-13A on display at Sempor Dam in Kebumen Regency, Cemtral Java.
- B-622 – BT-13A on display at Mangkang Zoo in Semarang, Central Java. It was stripped of all markings and painted blue.
- B-633 – BT-13A on display at Dirgantara Mandala Museum in Yogyakarta.

Netherlands

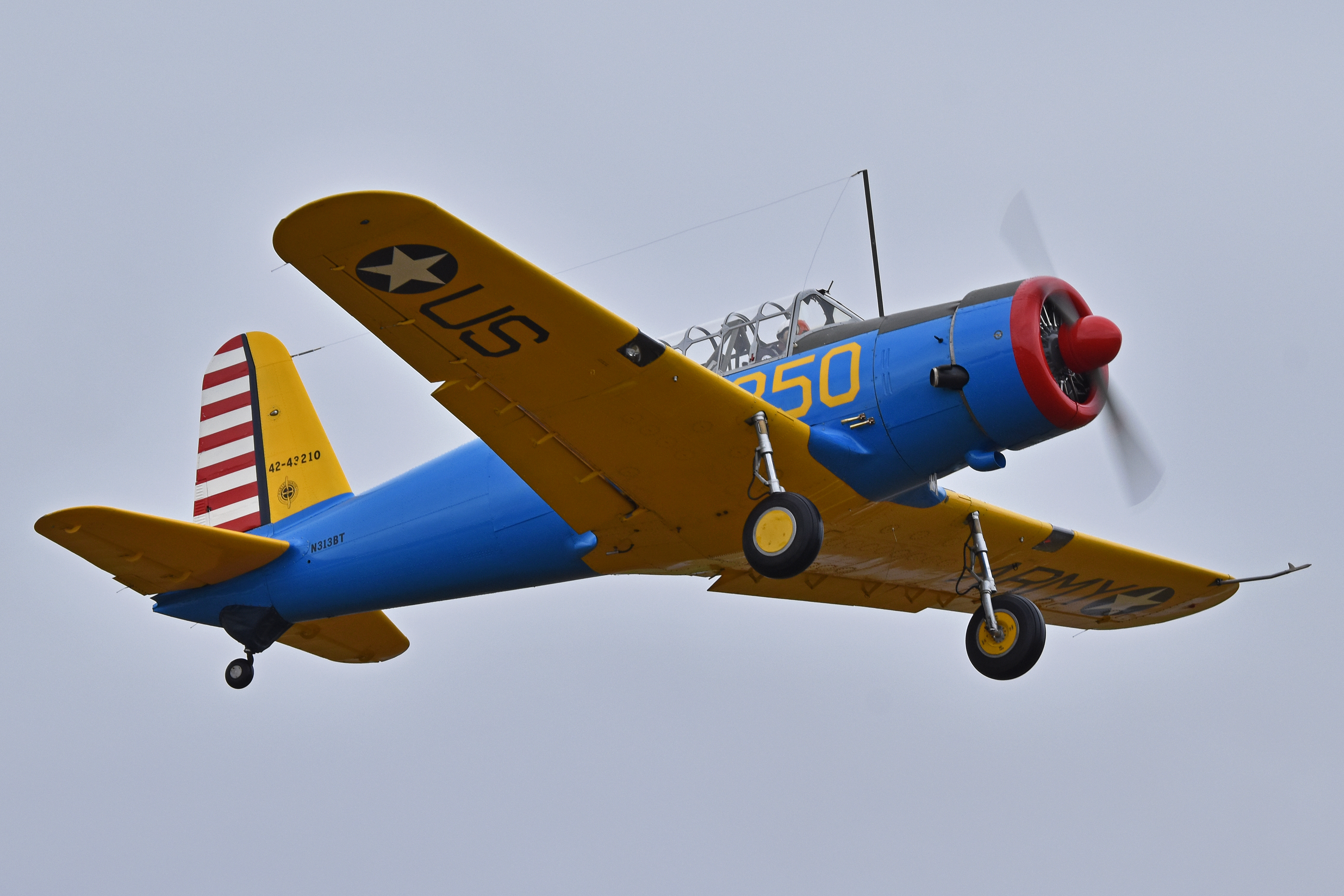
42-43210 (N313BT) at Duxford Aerodrome in England

- 42-43210 – BT-13A airworthy at the Early Birds Museum on Lelystad Airport in the Netherlands.

United States

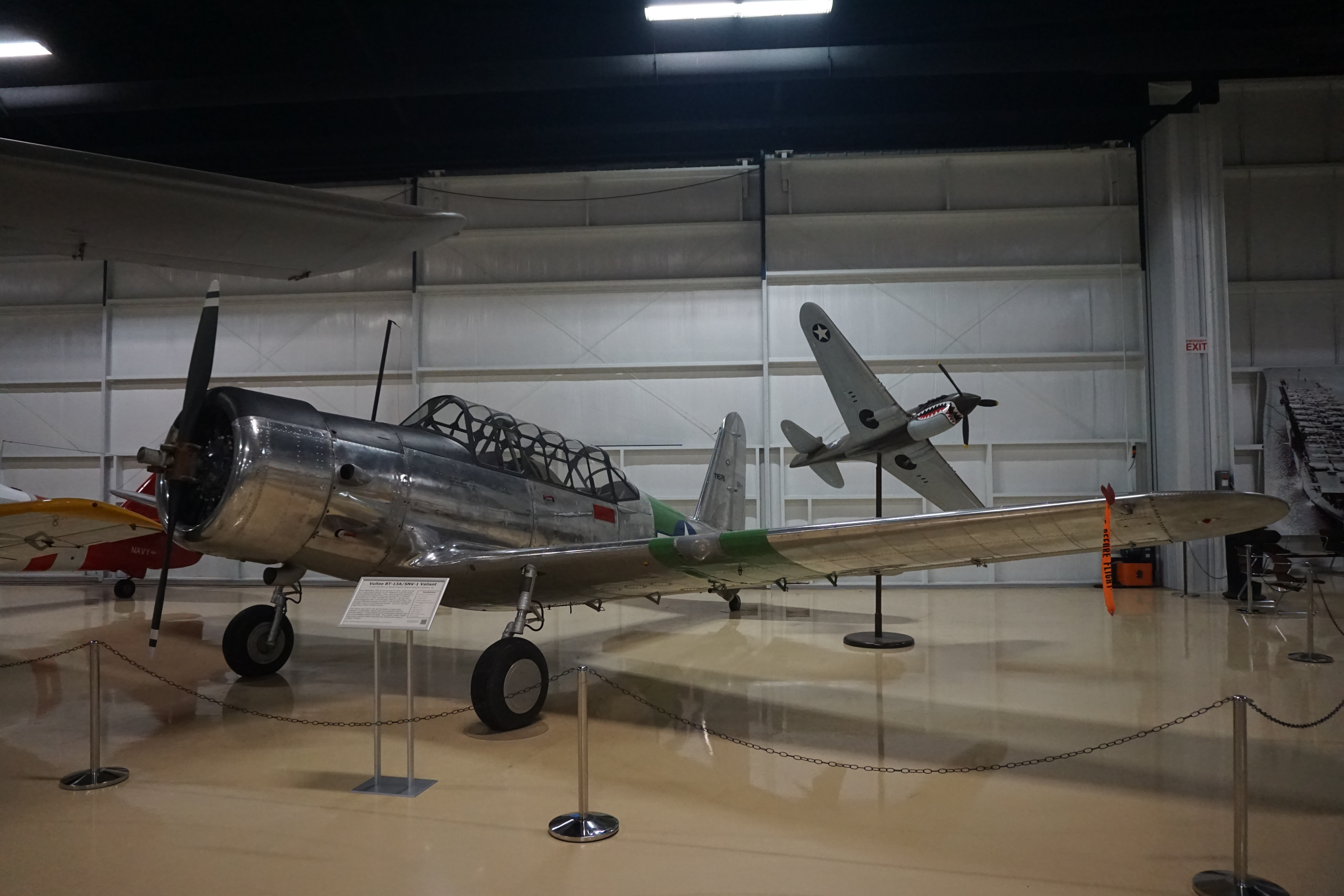
Vultee BT-13A/SNV-1 Valiant at the Air Zoo

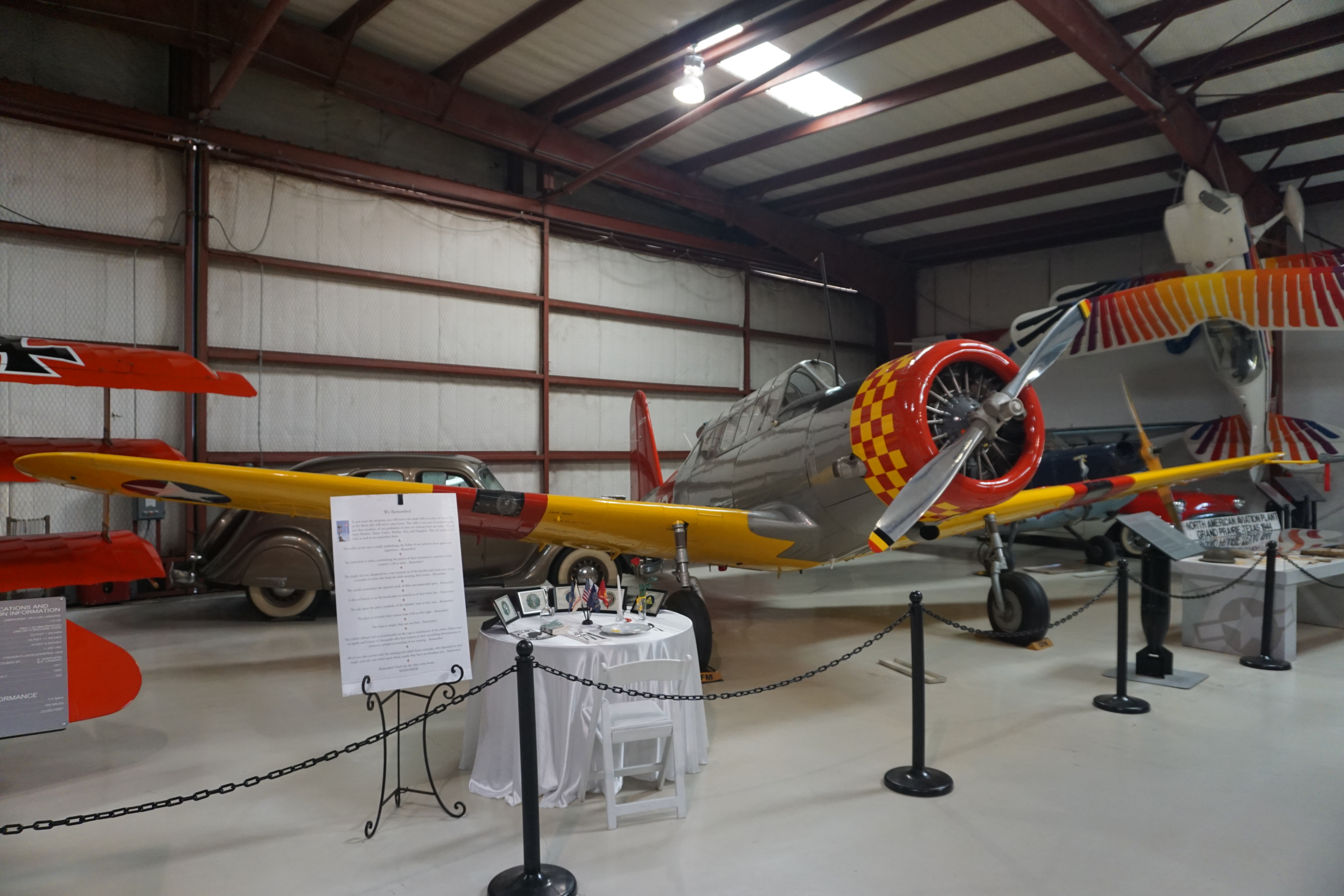
Vultee SNV-2 Valiant at the Cavanaugh Flight Museum

- 3022 – SNV-1 on static display at Main Campus of the Kalamazoo Air Zoo in Kalamazoo, Michigan.
- 156739 – SNV-1 airworthy at the Estrella Warbirds Museum in Paso Robles, California.
- 41-10418 – BT-13A on static display at the Combat Air Museum in Topeka, Kansas.
- 41-10571 – BT-13A on static display at the Quik Stop Mini-Mart in Caruthers, California. It is mounted nose-first on top of a gas station island awning.
- 41-10814 – BT-13A airworthy with Vultee Resource & Management in Yukon, Oklahoma.
- 41-11355 – BT-13A on static display at the National Naval Aviation Museum in Pensacola, Florida. It is painted as an SNV-1.
- 41-11538 – BT-13A airworthy with the Commemorative Air Force Minnesota Wing in South St. Paul, Minnesota.
- 41-11584 – BT-13A on static display at the Combat Air Museum in Topeka, Kansas.
- 41-21178 - BT-13A airworthy with the Commemorative Air Force in Houston, Texas.
- 41-21218 – BT-13A airworthy with Valiant Effort Foundation in Livermore, California.
- 41-21487 – BT-13A on static display at the March Field Air Museum in Riverside, California. It is painted as 41–22365.
- 41-21826 - BT-13A airworthy with the Commemorative Air Force in Dallas, Texas.
- 41-21933 – BT-13A on static display at the Travis Air Force Base Heritage Center at Travis Air Force Base in Fairfield, California.
- 41-22124 – BT-13A in storage at the Paul E. Garber Preservation, Restoration, and Storage Facility of the National Air and Space Museum in Suitland, Maryland.
- 41-22204 – BT-13A on static display at the South Dakota Air and Space Museum in Box Elder, South Dakota.
- 41-22386 – BT-13A on static display at the Moffett Field Historical Society Museum in Mountain View, California.
- 41-22441 – BT-13A airworthy at the Mid-Atlantic Air Museum in Reading, Pennsylvania.
- 41-23075 – BT-13A airworthy on loan from Rene J. Vercruyssen to the Chico Air Museum in Chico, California.
- 42-04130 – BT-13A on static display at Goodfellow Air Force Base in San Angelo, Texas.
- 42-41303 – BT-15 on static display at the Gunter Annex of Maxwell Air Force Base in Montgomery, Alabama.
- 42-42353 – BT-13A on static display at the Pima Air Museum in Tucson, Arizona.
- 42-88675 – BT-13A airworthy at the National WASP WWII Museum in Sweetwater, Texas.
- 42-88708 – BT-13 on display at the Naval Air Station Wildwood Aviation Museum in Rio Grande, New Jersey.
- 42-88855 – BT-13A airworthy with Barry D. Burns in Hubbard, Oregon.
- 42-89607 – BT-13B airworthy at the Yanks Air Museum in Chino, California.
- 42-89678 – BT-13A on static display at the Castle Air Museum in Atwater, California.
- 42-90018 – BT-13B on static display at the Museum of Aviation at Robins Air Force Base in Warner Robins, Georgia.
- 42-90026 – BT-13B airworthy with the Alaska Wing of the Commemorative Air Force in Anchorage, Alaska.
- 42-90296 – BT-13B airworthy at the War Eagles Air Museum in Santa Teresa, New Mexico.
- 42-90590 – BT-13B airworthy with Ryan Shively of Richland, Washington. It was delivered to the USAAF in May 1944 and served with the 54th Fighter Squadron, 2nd Air Commando Group, 4501st Base Unit, and 338th Base Unit.
- 42-90629 – BT-13B on static display at the National Museum of the United States Air Force in Dayton, Ohio.
- 42-90054 – BT-13B airworthy with the Planes of Fame Air Museum in Chino, California.
- c/n 7832 – BT-13A on static display at the Evergreen Aviation & Space Museum in McMinnville, Oregon.
- c/n 8408 – BT-13 on static display at the Fort Worth Aviation Museum in Fort Worth, Texas.
- Unknown ID – Unknown variant in storage in unrestored condition at the Planes of Fame Air Museum in Chino, California.
- Unknown ID – BT-13 under restoration at the Fargo Air Museum in Fargo, North Dakota.
- Unknown ID – BT-13A on static display at the Florida Keys Marathon International Airport in Marathon, Florida. [source: FAA registry search]
- 79-1366 – BT-13 airworthy on display at the Wings of Honor Museum in Walnut Ridge, Arkansas. [source: FAA registry search]

== Popular culture ==
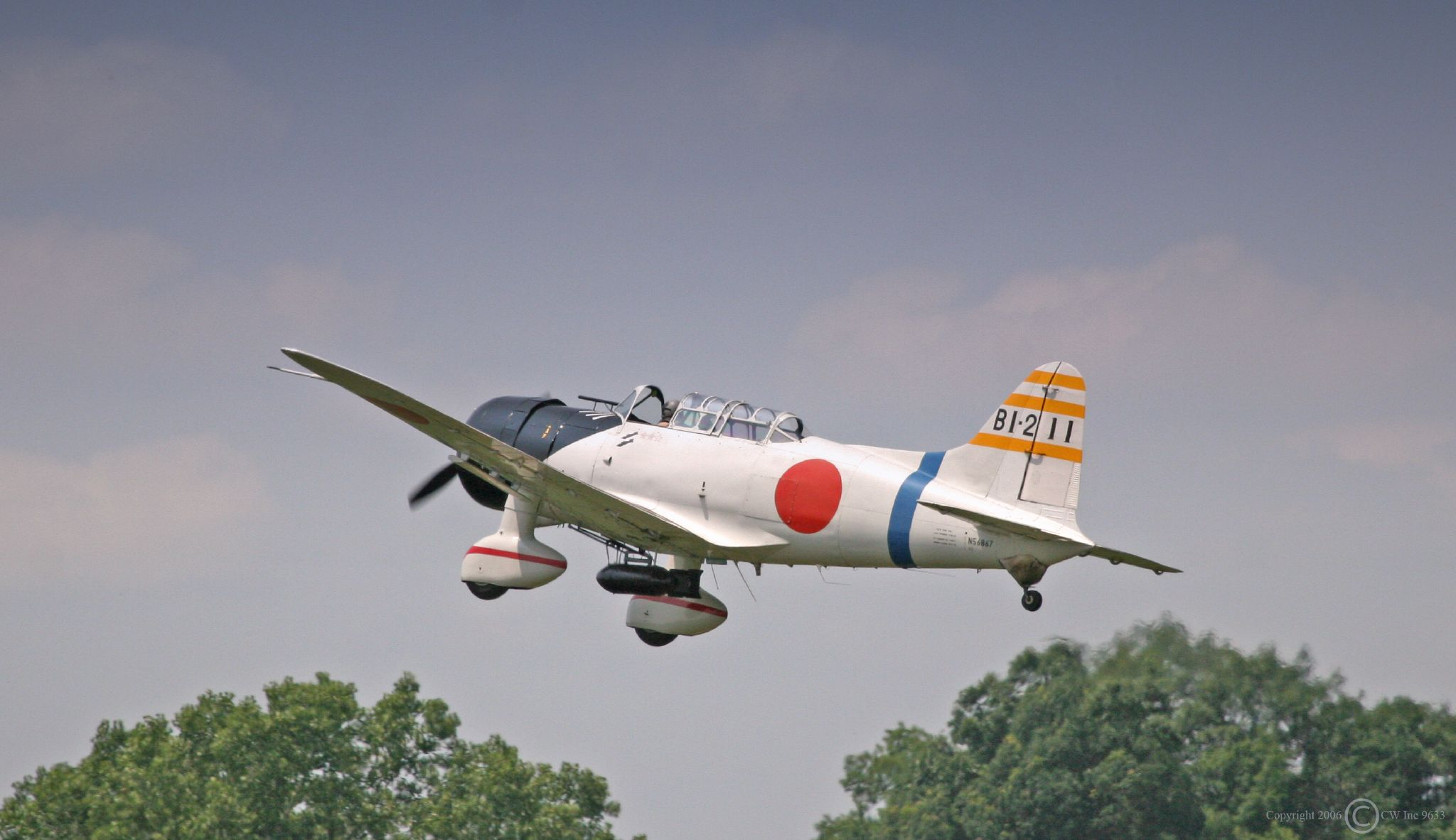
Aichi D3A replica at the Geneseo Airshow. In 1968 a Vultee BT-13 Valiant (N56867) was converted to a Val replica for use in the filming of the movie "Tora! Tora! Tora!", flown as Val "AI-244" (Carrier Akagi). The BT-13 has been maintained in that configuration ever since, and is now flown at airshows as "BI-211" with markings of Carrier Sōryū.

BTs were used by Twentieth Century Fox in the 1970 motion picture "Tora! Tora! Tora!", converted to look like Aichi D3A Vals. After filming, the studio sold or donated the altered aircraft.

== Specifications (BT-13A) ==
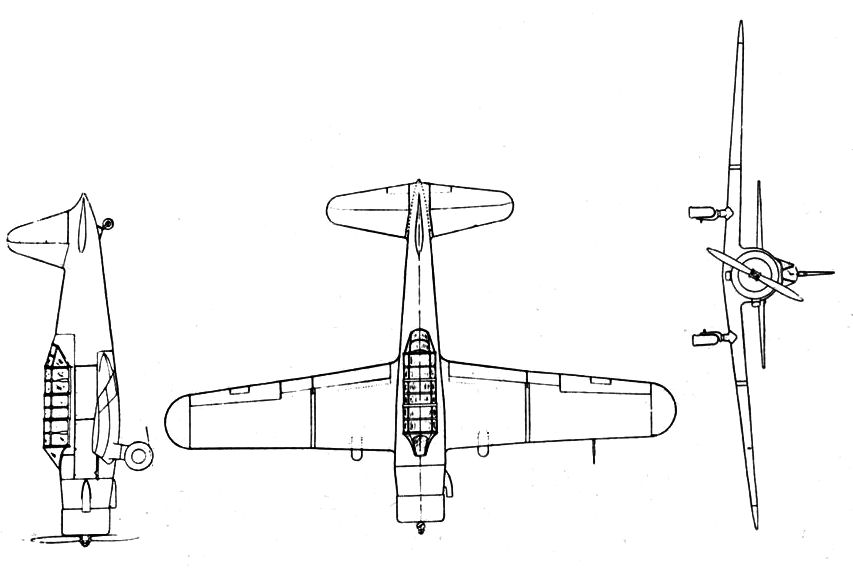
3-view line drawing of the Vultee Valiant

Data from United States Military Aircraft since 1909

General characteristics

- Crew: 2
- Length: 28 ft 10 in (8.79 m)
- Wingspan: 42 ft 0 in (12.80 m)
- Height: 11 ft 6 in (3.51 m)
- Wing area: 239 sq ft (22.2 m^{2})
- Empty weight: 3,375 lb (1,531 kg)
- Gross weight: 4,496 lb (2,039 kg)
- Powerplant: 1 × Pratt & Whitney R-985-AN-1 nine-cylinder air-cooled radial engine, 450 hp (340 kW)
- Propellers: 2-bladed Hamilton-Standard 2-position

Performance

- Maximum speed: 180 mph (290 km/h, 160 kn)
- Range: 725 mi (1,167 km, 630 nmi)
- Service ceiling: 21,650 ft (6,600 m)
- Time to altitude: 9.2 minutes to 10,000 ft (3,000 m)

== See also ==
Related development:

- Vultee P-66 Vanguard

Comparable aircraft:

- North American T-6 Texan

== Bibliography ==
- "Pentagon Over the Islands: The Thirty-Year History of Indonesian Military Aviation". Air Enthusiast Quarterly (2): 154–162. June 1976. ISSN 0143-5450.
- Andersson, Lennart (2008). A History of Chinese Aviation: Encyclopedia of Aircraft and Aviation in China to 1949. Taipei, Republic of China: AHS of ROC. ISBN 978-957-28533-3-7.
- Sapienza, Antonio Luis (May 2001). "L'aviation militare paraguayenne durant la seconde guerre mondiale" [Paraguayan Military Aviation During the Second World War]. Avions: Toute l'Aéronautique et son histoire (in French) (98): 30–33. ISSN 1243-8650.
- Swanborough, F. G.; Bowers, Peter M. (1963). U.S. Military Aircraft since 1909. London: Putnam. OCLC 464065470.
- Wegg, John (1990). General Dynamics Aircraft and Their Predecessors. London: Putnam Aeronautical Books. ISBN 0-85177-833-X.
