= Agua Caliente =

Agua Caliente, Aguas Calientes or Aguascalientes (Spanish for 'hot/warm water(s)' or 'hot spring(s)') may refer to:

== Places ==
=== Central America ===
- Agua Caliente, El Salvador
- San Antonio Aguas Calientes, Guatemala

=== Mexico ===
- Aguascalientes, a state in Mexico
  - Aguascalientes Municipality, a municipality in the state
  - Aguascalientes (city), the capital of the state and municipal seat of the municipality
  - Aguascalientes Territory, a federal territory (1835–1857), which became the state
- Agua Caliente, Tijuana, Baja California
- Agua Caliente de Gárate, Sinaloa

=== South America ===
- Aguas Calientes caldera, a caldera in Argentina
- Aguas Calientes, Jujuy, a town in Argentina
- Aguas Calientes, Peru, near Machu Picchu
- Aguas Calientes, Venezuela (disambiguation), two rivers
- Aguas Calientes, hot spring in southern Chile
- Aguas Calientes (volcano), a volcano in Chile

=== United States ===
==== Arizona ====
- Agua Caliente, Arizona
- Agua Caliente Mountains, a small range in southwest Arizona
- Agua Caliente Regional Park, in Tucson, Arizona

==== California ====
- Agua Caliente, former name of Palm Springs, California
- Agua Caliente Airport, in San Diego County
- Agua Caliente County Park, San Diego County
- Agua Caliente Springs at Agua Caliente County Park
- Agua Caliente Indian Reservation, Riverside County
- Caliente, California, Kern County, formerly Agua Caliente
- Fetters Hot Springs-Agua Caliente, California
- Rancho Agua Caliente (Higuera), a Mexican land grant in Alameda County
- Rancho Agua Caliente (Pina), a Mexican land grant in Sonoma County
- Tassajara Hot Springs, also recorded on mining claims as Agua Caliente, in Monterey County

== Sports ==
- Agua Caliente Clippers, an American professional Basketball team in Ontario, California
- Agua Caliente Open, a defunct golf tournament played in Tijuana, Mexico
- Agua Caliente Racetrack, a bullring and Thoroughbred race track in Tijuana, Baja California, Mexico
  - Agua Caliente Handicap, a defunct thoroughbred horse race
- New Arena at Agua Caliente, a sports arena being developed in Palm Springs, California

== Other uses ==
- Agua Caliente Band of Cahuilla Indians, a Native American tribe of the U.S. state of California
- Agua Caliente Casino Resort Spa, Rancho Mirage, California, U.S.
- Agua Caliente Casino and Hotel, Tijuana, Baja California, Mexico
- Agua Caliente Solar Project, a solar power station in Yuma County, Arizona, U.S.
- Agua Caliente (Terriers), an episode of the TV series Terriers

== See also ==
- Agua Caliente Casino (disambiguation)
- Convention of Aguascalientes, a meeting during the Mexican Revolution
