= List of airports in the San Diego area =

The following is a list of airports in the San Diego Area:

== International airports ==
=== United States ===
- San Diego International Airport (IATA: SAN, ICAO: KSAN, FAA LID: SAN) (San Diego, California, USA) is a public airport located 3 mi (4.8 km) northwest of the central business district of San Diego, California, and also 20 mi (32 km) from the Mexico – United States border at Tijuana, Mexico. It is owned by the San Diego County Regional Airport Authority.

=== Mexico ===
- Tijuana International Airport (IATA: TIJ, ICAO: MMTJ) (Tijuana, Baja California, Mexico), also known as General Abelardo L. Rodríguez International Airport, is directly adjacent to USA-Mexico border.

== Military airfields ==
- Coast Guard Air Station San Diego (San Diego, California) - shares field with San Diego International Airport
- Marine Corps Air Station Camp Pendleton (MCAS Camp Pendleton) - a United States Marine Corps airfield located within Marine Corps Base Camp Pendleton
- Marine Corps Air Station Miramar (MCAS Miramar) - a United States Marine Corps airfield located within Miramar, San Diego, California, formerly known as Naval Air Station (NAS) Miramar
- Naval Air Station North Island (Coronado, California) - located directly across San Diego Bay from San Diego International Airport, approximately 1.5 mi (2.4 km) to the south
- Naval Outlying Landing Field Imperial Beach (Imperial Beach, California)

== Towered general aviation airports ==
- Brown Field Municipal Airport (IATA: SDM, ICAO: KSDM, FAA LID: SDM) is located 13 miles (21 km) southeast of San Diego, along US-Mexico border.
- Gillespie Field (IATA: SEE, ICAO: KSEE, FAA LID: SEE) is a county-owned public-use airport located 10 miles (16 km) northeast of the central business district of San Diego in El Cajon.
- McClellan-Palomar Airport (IATA: CLD, ICAO: KCRQ, FAA LID: CRQ) is a public airport located three miles (5 km) southeast of the central business district of Carlsbad.
- Montgomery-Gibbs Executive Airport (IATA: MYF, ICAO: KMYF, FAA LID: MYF) is located six miles (10 km) north of the central business district of San Diego.
- Ramona Airport (ICAO: KRNM, FAA LID: RNM, formerly L39) is located two miles (3 km) west of the central business district of Ramona.

== Non-towered general aviation airports ==
- Agua Caliente Airport (FAA LID: L54) is located one mile (1.6 km) northeast of Agua Caliente Springs.
- Borrego Valley Airport (IATA: BXS, FAA LID: L08) is located three nautical miles (6 km) east of the central business district of Borrego Springs.
- Fallbrook Community Airpark (FAA LID: L18) is located two miles (3.2 km) south of Fallbrook.
- Jacumba Airport
- Lake Wohlford
- Oceanside Municipal Airport (IATA: OCN, ICAO: KOKB, FAA LID: OKB) is a public airport located two miles (3 km) northeast of the central business district of Oceanside.
- Ocotillo Airport
- Pauma Valley Airfield

== Other notable aviation facilities ==
- Torrey Pines Gliderport (FAA LID: CA84) is a city-owned private-use glider airport located 11 nautical miles (20 km) northwest of the central business district of San Diego.

== Notable closed airports ==
- Border Naval Outlying Landing Field South San Diego - now Border Field State Park
- Del Mar Municipal Airport
- Kearney-Mesa Airport (Kearney Mesa)
- La Pressa Airport (Spring Valley) - now Spring Valley Shopping Center
- Linda Vista Mesa Field (also known as Hourglass Field and Miramar Naval Outer Landing Field) (Mira Mesa)
- National City Airport (National City) - now part of California State Route 54, and National City Boulevard & West 35th Street in National City
- North Coyote Wells Naval Outlying Landing Field
- Otay-Mesa Naval Auxiliary Air Station (NAAS) (Otay Mesa)
- Red Beach Marine Corps Airfield (Oceanside)
- Rosedale Naval Outlying Landing Field
- South Coyote Wells Naval Outlying Landing Field
- Sweetwater Dam Naval Outlying Landing Field (also known as Sweetwater Airport) (Encanto) - now Paradise Hills housing development

== See also ==
- Air route traffic control center
- Los Angeles Air Route Traffic Control Center
- San Diego Harbor Police
- Port of San Diego
