= Music of Tucson, Arizona =

Tucson, Arizona has a strong, growing independent music culture that focuses on locally grown and locally derived musical genres. The city is home to musical organizations that seek to nurture artists from the local music scene as well as introduce the community to other musical styles from beyond Southern Arizona.

== Regional musical genres ==
Tucson is home to both home-grown and imported musical styles and influences, including:

- Desert Funk / Desert Groove / Roots Music – influenced by Sly and the Family Stone, Miles Davis, Stevie Wonder, Willie Nelson and Billie Holiday
- Desert Noir
- Desert Rock
- Mariachi – an integration of stringed instruments highly influenced by the cultural impacts of the historical development of Western Mexico
- Native American Jazz – blends Native American and non-Native musical traditions
- Sonoran Dirty Rock
- Tohono O'odham waila
- Western Cowboy

== Notable musical organizations ==
- Arizona Opera – baroque, bel canto and verismo works, turn-of-the-century masterpieces, operettas and American operas
- Tucson Jazz Institute - Tucson's Award winning high school jazz ensemble
- Century Room Jazz Orchestra - a classic jazz big band home to the Century Room at Hotel Congress
- Mexican Institute of Sound – electronic music project created by Mexico City-based DJ and producer Camilo Lara
- Tucson Junior Strings
- Tucson Symphony Orchestra – the oldest symphony orchestra in the American Southwest

== Tucson Area Music Awards (TAMMIES) ==
The annual public-choice music awards – nicknamed the TAMMIES – seeks to recognize local talent by highlighting Tucson's best musical performers. The awards are held in the fall and are sponsored by Tucson Weekly magazine.

== Recurring musical festivals and fairs ==
- Tucson Film & Music Festival celebrates the past, present and future of the Tucson, Arizona music and filmmaking scene

== Notable musicians, bands, and groups ==
The following Tucson-based artists have been featured in a variety of local and national media.

- Alter Der Ruine – power noise / electronic music / industrial music
- Black Sun Ensemble – psychedelic rock
- Calexico – musical style is influenced by traditional Latin sounds of mariachi and Tejano music; blends "jazzy-rock with traditional Mexican music"
- Friends of Dean Martinez – instrumental rock/post-rock band, Americana tunes with influences from electronica, ambient, lounge.
- Sergio Mendoza y la Orkesta – psychedelic, indie, mambo, cumbia and jazz
- Tucson Arizona Boys Chorus
- Tucson Desert Harmony Chorus
- Tucson Girls Chorus

== Notable venues ==
- Tucson Music Hall
- Centennial Hall
- Fox Tucson Theatre
- The Rialto Theatre
- Club Congress
