= L18 =

L18, L-18 or L.18 may refer to:

== Vehicles ==
Aircraft

- Albatros L 18, a German biplane
- Lockheed L-18 Lodestar, an American passenger aircraft
- L18, a United States Navy L-class blimp
- Piper L-18, an American light aircraft

Ships

- HMS L18, a submarine of the Royal Navy
- HMS Flamingo (L18), a sloop of the Royal Navy
- HMS Talybont (L18), a destroyer of the Royal Navy
- INS Cheetah (L18), a tank landing ship of the Indian Navy
- Soviet submarine L-18, a Leninets-class submarine

== Other uses ==
- 60S ribosomal protein L18
- Fallbrook Community Airpark, in San Diego County, California
- Lectionary 18, a 12th-century, Greek manuscript of the New Testament
- Mitochondrial ribosomal protein L18
- Nissan L18 engine, an automobile engine
- General Motors L18 engine, an automobile and boat engine.
