= Sun Circle =

Outdoor sculpture in Pima County, Arizona

- Artist: Chris Tanz, Susan Holman, Paul T. Edwards
- Year: 1994
- Type: sculpture
- Medium: split-face block, flagstone, concrete (smooth and exposed aggregate), sunlight
- Subject: archaeoastronomy
- Dimensions: 15 m diameter (50 ft)
- Location: Tucson, Arizona; 32.301024°N 111.0075825°W
- Owner: Pima County Parks and Recreation
- Website: http://www.christanz.com/sun-circle/

The Sun Circle is a sculpture located within the Rillito River Park, a Pima County linear park running along the banks of the Rillito River north of Tucson, Arizona. Inspired by the archaeoastronomy of the southwestern United States Ancestral Puebloans in locations such as Chaco Canyon, Sun Circle uses astronomical alignments to cast shadows and light through apertures (windows) to align with corresponding windows on equinoxes and solstices at sunrise and sunset.

== Description ==
The sculpture is an outdoor circular concrete pad 50 feet (15.2 m) in diameter circumscribed by eight walls 7 feet (2.1 m) high by 12 feet (3.7 m) wide. Four of the walls are in the cardinal directions, with four adjacent walls situated at angular distances of 23.4 degrees (corresponding with the axial tilt of the Earth) north and south of the east and west walls. The cardinal East and West walls have square windows, the four adjacent walls have isosceles trapezoid windows.

Summer Solstice Sunset

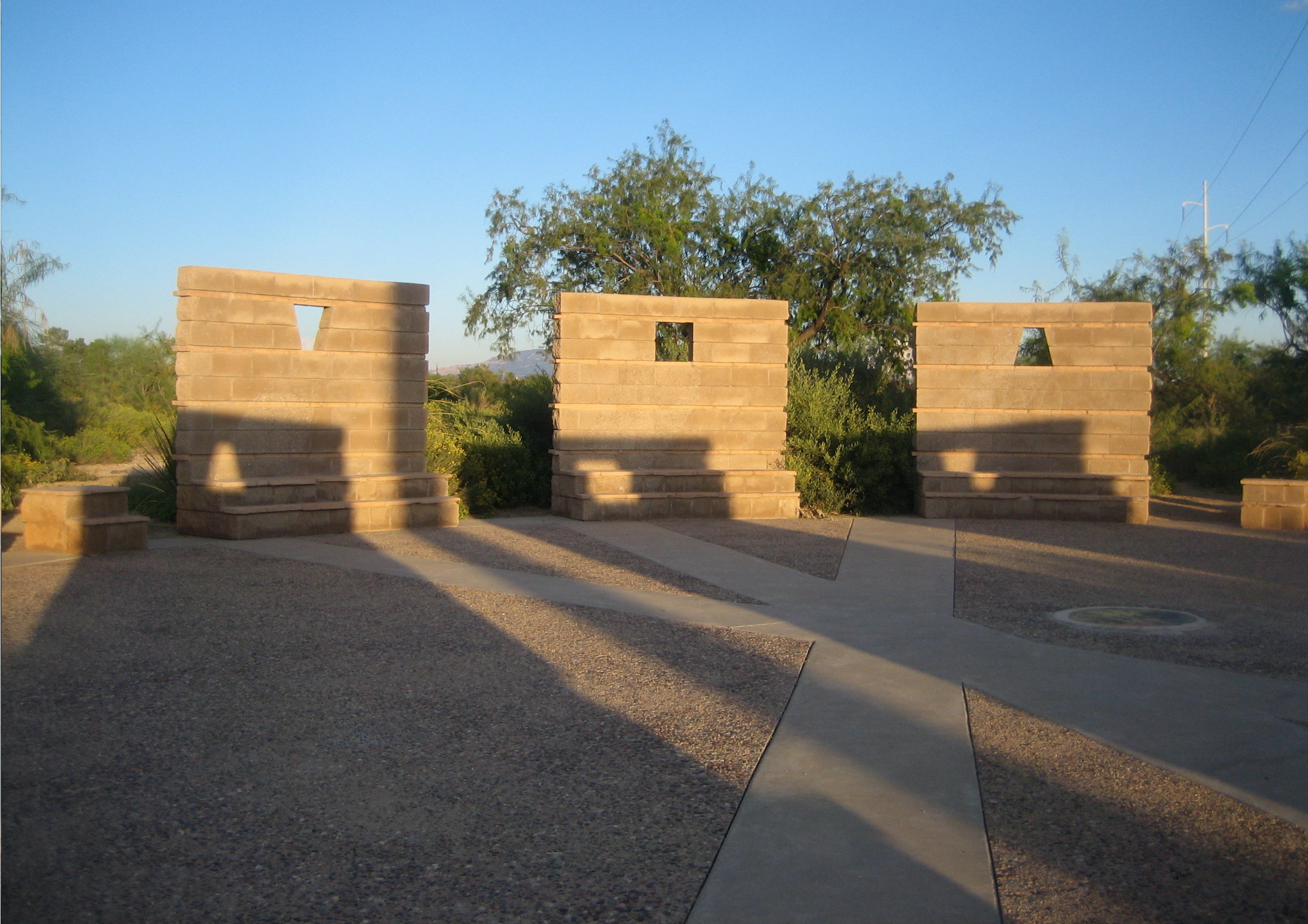
Autumnal Equinox Sunset

Summer Solstice sunset seen through southeastern and northwestern walls

At sunrise of any given day, the sunlight hitting the eastern walls will cast shadows across the circle, as light passes through the windows. As the Sun rises the shadows will shorten, appearing to shrink away from the western walls until the Sun reaches solar noon. The shadows of the three western walls then grow towards the eastern walls as the Sun continues west.

On the day of a summer solstice at daybreak sunlight passing through the window of the northeastern wall also passes through the window of the southwestern wall. As the Sun rises the light through the window travels down a path sandblasted into the southwestern wall and then travels along a line marked in the circular concrete pad. At late afternoon the sunlight through the window travels up a sandblasted path in the northeastern wall until at sunset the sunlight passes through both the northwestern and southeastern windows.

Winter solstice is similar except the sunlight first passes through the southeastern and northwestern windows at daybreak and passes through the southwestern and northeastern windows at sunset.

On the Equinox sunlight passing through all three eastern windows passes through the three corresponding western windows at daybreak and through the three western windows to the three corresponding windows at sunset.
