= Aguas Calientes, Venezuela =

Aguas Calientes is the name of two rivers in Venezuela:

- Aguas Calientes River (Carabobo)
- Aguas Calientes River (Sucre)

== See also ==
- Agua Caliente (disambiguation)
