= Butcher's Broom (novel) =

1934 novel by Neil M. Gunn

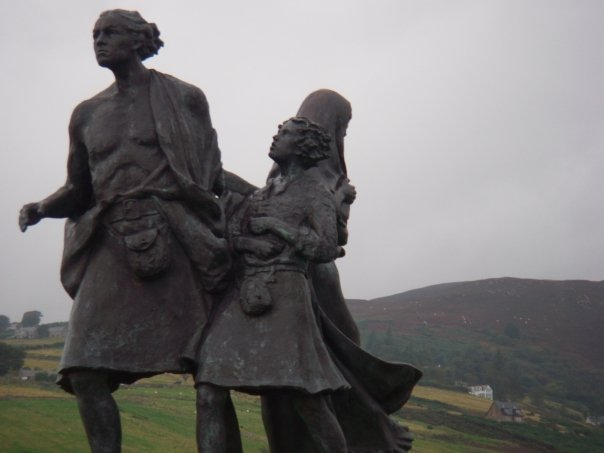
- Author: Neil M. Gunn
- Language: English
- Genre: Fiction
- Publisher: Canongate
- Publication date: 1934
- Publication place: Scotland
- Media type: Print (Paperback)
- Pages: 429 pp (first edition, hardback)
- ISBN: 9781904598916
- Preceded by: Sun Circle
- Followed by: Highland River

Butcher's Broom is an epic, historical novel by Neil M. Gunn written and published in 1934, and re-titled Highland Night for its first American printing in 1935. Based on a semi-fictionalised account of the Highland Clearances in Sutherland, the novel deals with the decline of Highland culture in a wide scope of pre-Clearance and post-Clearance life, as well as the Clearances themselves.

== Plot ==
The book opens on Dark Mairi, a local healer and widow making her way back to the Strath where she, her grandson Davie and Elie (a young woman from the community) live. They live on the Riasgan estate where they have lived for many years under the ancient clan system. The decline of the clan system is one of the catalysts that drives the Clearances and the plot of the novel. Elie falls in love with Colin, a young man in the community and falls pregnant to him, just as he leaves to go to fight in the Napoleonic Wars for regiment raised by the local Captain, who as tacksman emigrates, leaving his community lacking the protection he once provided.

Elie wanders the Lowlands destitute with her child but returns to the community an outcast just as the threat of clearance hangs over the whole Strath (this is carried out by a thinly veiled equivalent of Patrick Sellar called Heller). Through this all Young Davie struggles to regain his trust for Elie, and Elie also attracts the attentions of Rob the Miller, who eventually marries her.

The community is burned out and cleared to the rocky shore, with a wall erected to stop them using their old lands. They eke out a pitiful existence in a harsh environment. Mairi is killed at the end by an estate sheepdog. Colin returns from the war to find his community relocated and overtly changed. He encounters he and Elie's son Colin, and together, although not recognising each other as father and son they bury Mairi according to custom.

== Significance ==
Butcher's Broom was one of the first pieces of 20th Century fiction to deal with the Highland Clearances. It deals with the social unrest which came with the decline of the Highland Clan System as chiefs became anglicised, the tacksmen emigrated and attitudes of laissez-faire capitalism and a belief in the inferiority of Gaelic culture arose to prominence in the 1800s.

Whilst Riasgan is a fictional location, the Clearances are very similar to those carried out in Strathnaver and Strath Kildonan, including the death of 93 year old Margaret MacKay, allegedly through the neglect by Patrick Sellar and his men.

It is Gunn's only book which directly deals with the Clearances, although many of his works are written in the historic aftermath of the events. When asked why he never wrote more than one novel about the Clearances itself, he referenced the complicity of Lowland Scots and the Highland Gentry in the process saying it was due "To the shame of the thing.. because our own people did it."
