= Dunbeath Water =

Coordinates: 58°14′41″N 3°25′21″W

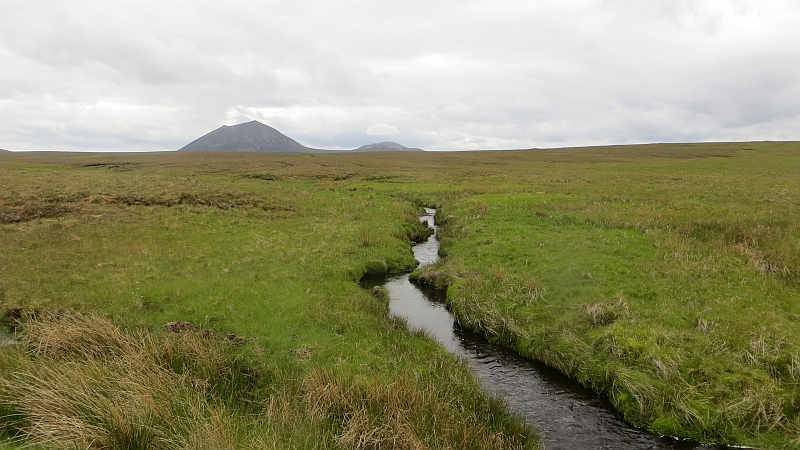
Dunbeath Water in 2015

Dunbeath Water is a short river in Caithness in northern Scotland. It rises at Loch Braigh na h-Aibhne in the Flow Country and initially flows northeast before turning generally south-southeastward to flow through Dunbeath and into the Moray Firth at Dunbeath Bay. Its main tributaries in its upper catchment are the left-bank ones of Allt a' Bhuic which drains Loch Dubh and the Raffin Burn which drains Loch Breac. On the western edge of Dunbeath, the Burn of Houstry, fortified by the Allt an Learanaich also enter on the north bank. The river is crossed by the old bridge and a new bridge carrying the modern A9 road northwards. A small harbour has been developed at the river mouth.
