= Montgomery-Gibbs Executive Airport =

Montgomery-Gibbs Executive Airport Gibbs AF Auxiliary Field
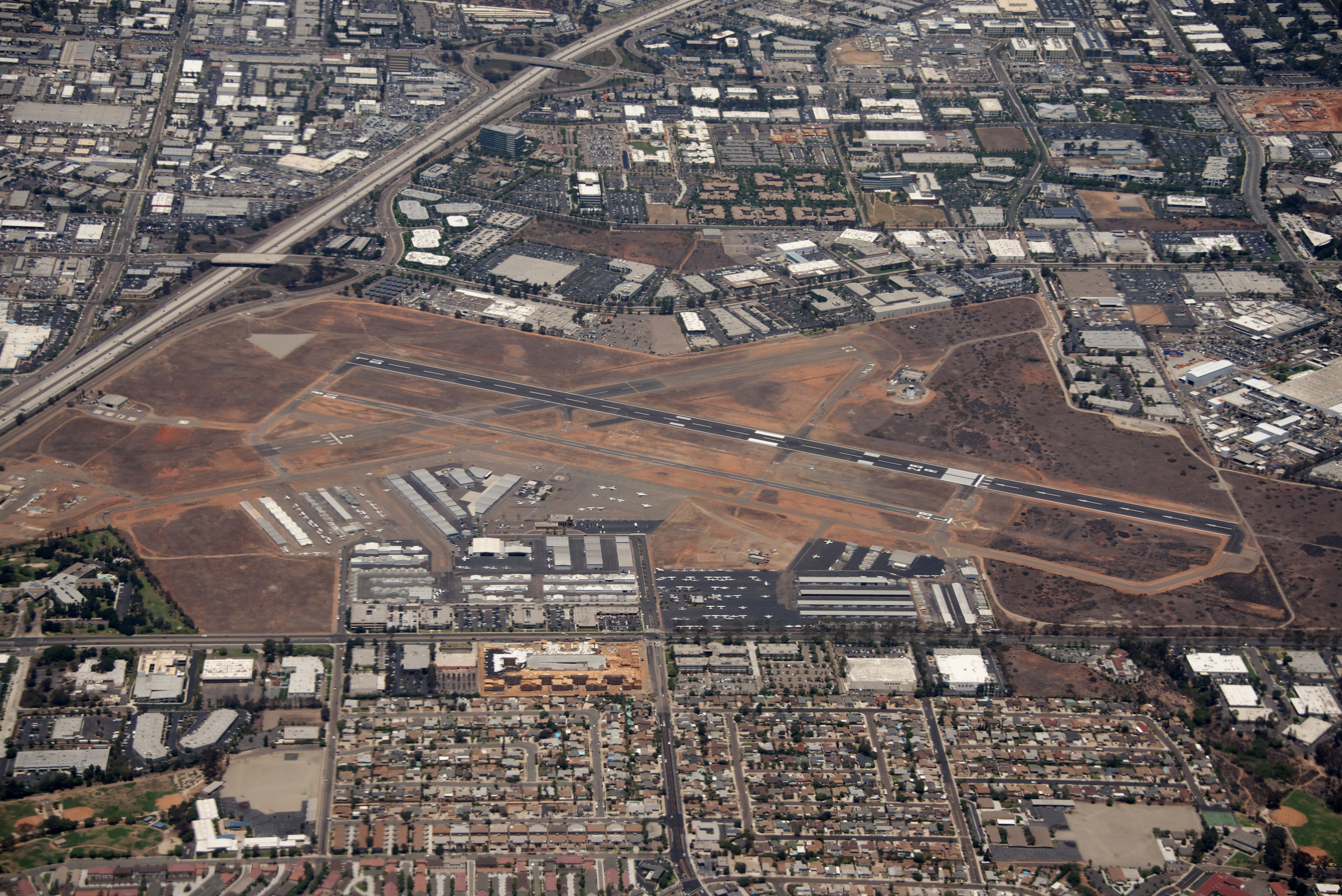
- IATA: MYF; ICAO: KMYF; FAA LID: MYF

Summary
- Airport type: Public
- Operator: City of San Diego
- Location: San Diego, California
- Elevation AMSL: 427 ft (130 m)
- Coordinates: 32°48′57″N 117°08′22″W

Maps
- FAA airport diagram
- Location within California MYF (the United States)

Runways
Direction	Length		Surface
Direction	ft	m	Surface
05/23	3,400	1,036	Asphalt
10L/28R	4,598	1,401	Asphalt
10R/28L	3,401	1,037	Asphalt

Helipads
Number	Length		Surface
Number	ft	m	Surface
H1	100	30	Asphalt
H2	48	15	Asphalt

Statistics (2019)
- Aircraft operations: 253,199
- Based aircraft: 458
- Source: Federal Aviation Administration

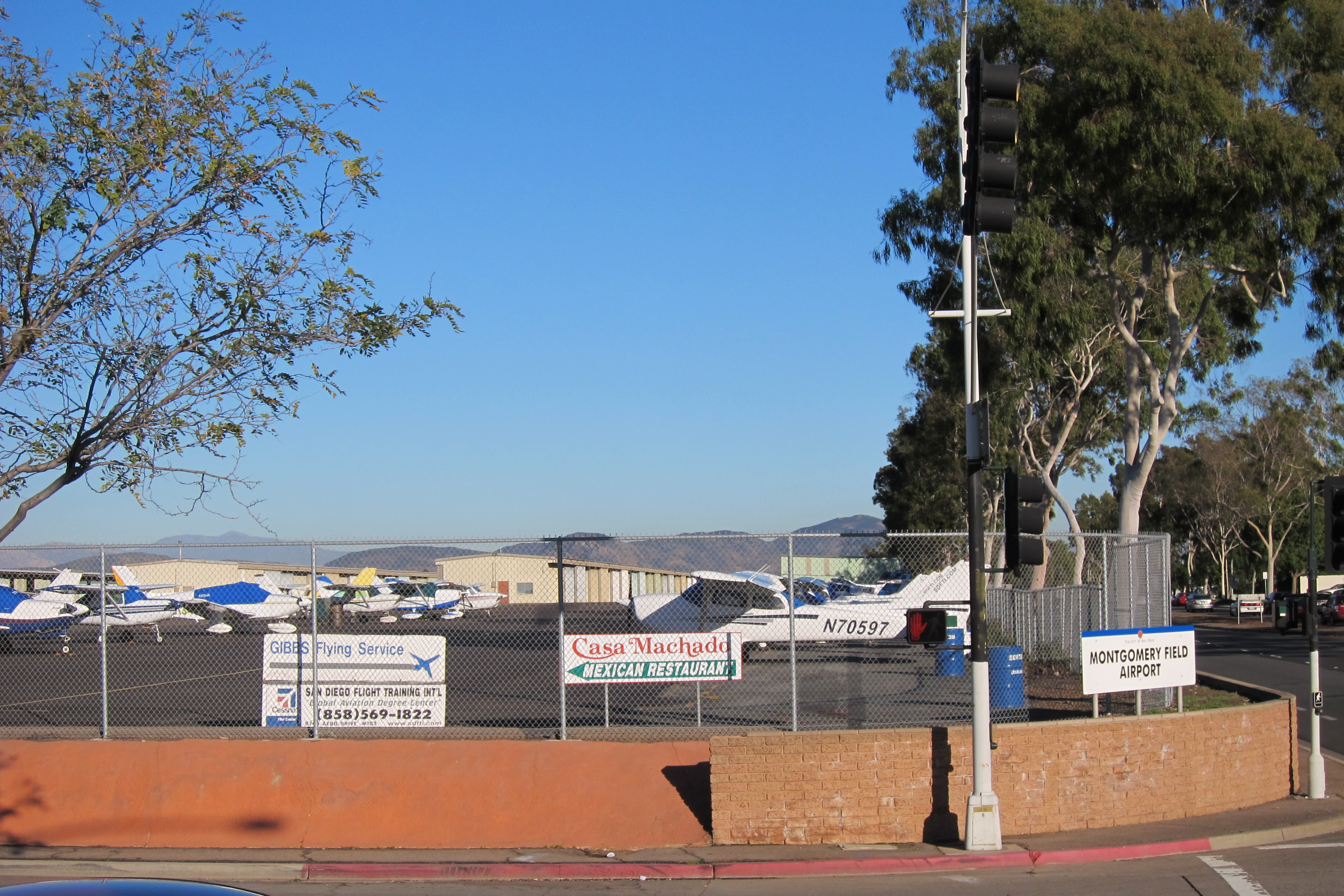
Entrance to Montgomery-Gibbs Executive Airport from Aero Drive

Montgomery-Gibbs Executive Airport (IATA: MYF, ICAO: KMYF, FAA LID: MYF) is a public airport in San Diego, California, United States, six miles (10 km) north of downtown San Diego. The airport covers 456 acres (185 ha) and has three runways, one public helipad, and two private helipads. The runways are 28R/10L and 28L/10R (parallel) and 5/23.

== History ==
First known as Gibbs Field, the airport opened in July 1940 as an all-way clay and gravel surface airfield. It was founded by William Gibbs (1910–2016). In 1950, the airport was renamed Montgomery Field in honor of John Joseph Montgomery, an aviation pioneer who, in 1884 to 1886, made the first manned, controlled, heavier-than-air flights in the United States from Otay Mesa, south of San Diego, starting with a glider designed in 1883. Montgomery-Gibbs assumed its current name in 2016 to recognize both of the airport's previous namesakes.

=== World War II ===
During World War II, the United States Army Air Forces assumed control of the airport and built three hard runways. It was called "Gibbs Auxiliary Field" and used as a support airfield for the contractor pilot school at Ryan Field, near Hemet. It also supported training activities at the United States Army Desert Training Center (DTC) in the Mojave Desert, and later as an auxiliary airfield for Lindbergh Field in San Diego. It was used presumably as an overflow airfield to store newly manufactured B-24 Liberator bombers and PBY Catalina amphibian aircraft made by Consolidated Aircraft. Following the war, the airport returned to civil control.

== Modern usage ==
Montgomery-Gibbs Executive Airport is one of the busiest airports in the U.S. for small aircraft and has a number of flying clubs and flight schools. Business turboprops and jets are based there. Both the San Diego Fire Department and San Diego Police Department base aircraft there. King Schools, Inc. is based nearby, and its aircraft are based at the airport. Since summer 2009, King Schools (in conjunction with Cessna) has been flight testing the prototype Cessna 162 Skycatcher Light-Sport Aircraft at and around the airport.

The Federal Aviation Administration (FAA) has maintained an air traffic control tower at the airport since 1965. It is on the north side of the airport, just east of taxiway C and runway 5/23. It operates from 0600 to 2100 local time.

In April 2021, the airport completed a $10 million upgrade that included six new hangars; a fueling facility for private jets and propeller planes; and a new two-story, 9,000 square-foot building containing a flight school and an executive lounge for business travelers.

== Accidents and incidents ==
- On September 25, 1978, a Cessna 172 registered as N7711G took off from Montgomery Field and proceeded to Lindbergh Field to do a practice instrument landing (ILS) approach. PSA Flight 182 (N533PS) was heading east on its downwind descent before landing at Lindbergh. The PSA Boeing 727 hit the Cessna from behind, causing N7711G to disintegrate and flight 182 to crash.
- On February 17, 1983, a Piper 601P registered as N90353 crashed shortly after takeoff, killing all five aboard.
- On November 11, 1983, a Beech 56TC registered as N911SC collided with power lines while landing. The aircraft caught on fire and crashed, killing all four aboard.
- On May 17, 1990, a Cessna 152 registered as N783G stalled on final approach and abruptly crashed. The student pilot, flying solo, was killed.
- On April 1, 1993, a radio disc jockey, Dave Rickards of 101.5 KGB, pulled a prank on his listeners, saying that the Space Shuttle was landing at the field because of a "systems malfunction" at Edwards AFB. Hundreds showed up, causing traffic issues.
- On December 24, 1996, a Piper PA-28 registered as N943R collided with a Cessna 150 (N63137) while the two aircraft were making their final approaches to parallel runways. The aircraft failed to maintain visual separation and the low-wing Piper overtook the high-wing Cessna from behind and above. The Piper's control cables were severed by the Cessna's propeller and it crashed, killing both the student pilot and flight instructor. The Cessna made a forced landing, and both occupants survived.
- On February 19, 2010, a Cirrus SR-22 Turbo Gen-3, registered as N443CP, was stolen from Montgomery Field and proceeded to Los Angeles International Airport.
- On August 2, 2010, an experimental Velocity Super XL registered as N444YP crashed into a golf course shortly after takeoff at the airport, killing two of the five aboard.
- On March 2, 2014, a Mooney M20S Eagle registered as N56FM sustained minor damage after a gear-up landing. The sole occupant, the pilot, was uninjured in the incident.
- On July 30, 2014, a Mooney M20L registered as N147MP crashed in an adjacent shopping center parking lot after a failed go-around at the airport. Of the two occupants on board, the passenger was killed and the pilot was seriously injured.
- On December 9, 2017, a Beechcraft Bonanza with four people on board crashed shortly after taking off from Montgomery-Gibbs. The pilot and a passenger survived with burn injuries while the two other passengers were killed.
- On September 24, 2020, a Great Lakes Sport Trainer with two people on board crashed shortly after taking off from Montgomery-Gibbs Executive Airport and landed in the rear parking lot of a nearby business. The pilot and a passenger were taken to a local hospital in an unknown condition.
- On February 13, 2021 a Dassault Falcon 900EX (N823RC), with 5 people on board overran Runway 28R after a rejected takeoff. The aircraft came to rest off the opposite end of runway 28R. All five people on board escaped unharmed.
- On October 11, 2021, a twin-engine Cessna 340 crashed while approaching Montgomery-Gibbs. The crash occurred near the campus of Santana High School in Santee. The aircraft struck three houses, killing at least two people.
- On November 5, 2022, a single engine Cirrus SR-20 Reg: N700YZ crashed during a landing attempt after a single loop around the airport. The pilot was rushed to the nearby Sharp hospital in critical condition, where he died from his injuries later that day.
- On May 22, 2025, a twin-engine Cessna 550 business jet crashed while approaching the airport during dense fog. Multiple homes and cars were destroyed in nearby military housing in Tierrasanta. All six people on board the plane died.
- On July 13, 2025, a single engine Cessna TTX owned by Peter G. Schultz was cleared to approach to land on runway 28R, but instead continued its western course at 2,600 feet with no response to calls from ATC. It eventually disappeared from radar 470 miles off the coast of San Diego and is believed to have crashed. A friend of Schultz was piloting the aircraft and is believed to be the only fatality.

== See also ==
- List of airports in the San Diego area
- California World War II Army Airfields
