= Highland River =

1937 novel by Neil M. Gunn

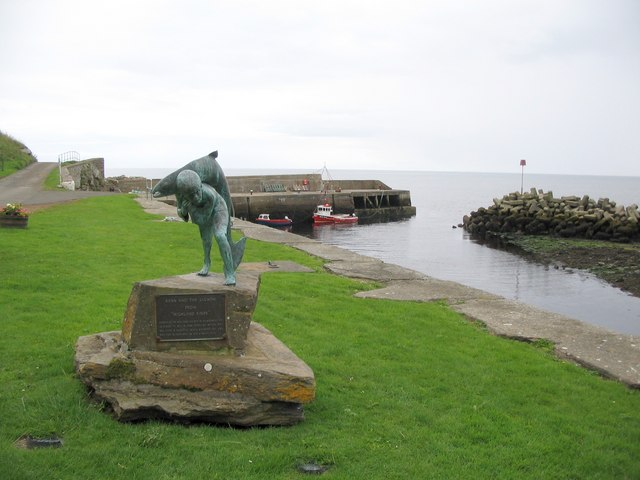
- Kenn and the Salmon, a statue in memory of Neil Gunn at Dunbeath harbour
- Author: Neil M. Gunn
- Language: English
- Genre: Fiction
- Publisher: Canongate
- Publication date: 1937
- Publication place: Scotland
- Media type: Print (Paperback)
- Pages: 256 pp (first edition, hardback)
- ISBN: 0-86241-358-3 (1997 new edition, paperback)
- Preceded by: Butcher's Broom
- Followed by: Wild Geese Overhead

Highland River is a novel by Neil M. Gunn. Its plot revolves around a young boy called Kenn who grows up next to the Dunbeath river, then going on to experience the horrors of the First World War and his attempts to rediscover inner peace and satisfaction on his return to his village.

== Plot ==
The plot is episodic and moves between Kenn's childhood and adult life. It begins with a young Kenn poaching his first salmon from the Dunbeath river. He encounters a sadistic beating from a schoolmaster, adventures in the trenches which result in his brother Angus suffering from shellshock and he meets Radzyn, an intellectual, scientific European who does not share Kenn's belief in the mystery of existence.

Kenn's ultimate goal is to 'get back to the source of...life... the source of the river and the source of himself'.

Gunn's description of his 'Highland River' (a.k.a. Dunbeath River) is wholly accurate, avoiding literary licence in capturing the very essence of its pools and surrounding environment.

== Themes ==
Gunn was influenced greatly by Jungian archetypes and the idea of a collective unconsciousness is prevalent in Highland River. The idea of Kenn returning to the river to complete himself reflects the journey that the salmon make, returning to the place where they were spawned to spawn themselves then die.

Like many early twentieth-century Scottish writers, Gunn believed in a lost 'Golden Age', when man was in touch with the natural and his environment, in contrast to a complex and disintegrating modern World.

Kenn's childhood memories are presented in a stream of consciousness way.
