= Tucson Girls Chorus =

Arizona based choir

- Choir
- Origin: Tucson, Arizona
- Founded: 1985
- Founder: Margie Kersey
- Music director: Marcela Molina
- Website: www.tucsongirlschorus.org

The Tucson Girls Chorus is a girls' choir based in Tucson, Arizona. Founded in 1985, the non-profit organization accommodates girls aged 6 to 18 in six main choirs and numerous satellite choirs in low-income communities. Chorus members perform locally, nationally, and internationally. The chorus has released several CDs. In 2017, the organization opened the city's first public choir for girls and boys with special needs.

== History ==
The Tucson Girls Chorus was founded in 1985 by Margie Kersey, who had been working as a music teacher since 1965. The initial call for auditions attracted 63 girls, and the first concert took place in spring 1985. By 1986, choirs were performing at local events such as the Tucson Rodeo Parade and Christmas tree lighting ceremonies. The first U.S. tour took place in April 1987 in Los Angeles, California, and the first international tour was scheduled in 1999 in the United Kingdom. A choral summer camp opened in 1995.

Membership in the chorus reached a high of 263 girls in five choirs by the time of Kersey's retirement in 2005. However, shortly after her departure, the organization went into decline, with staff members and board members leaving the project and membership falling to a low of 60 girls. New artistic director Marcela Molina, a native of Bogotá, Colombia, and holder of a doctorate in choral conducting from the University of Arizona, launched membership drives and also broadened the group's community outreach. The chorus regained its footing and began increasing its membership and profile.

Each of the main choirs performs in a public concert in May and December. Touring takes place in the spring, with the Jubilate Choir performing in regional concerts in California, New Mexico, and Washington, and the Advanced Choir performing across the United States and also internationally, having visited France, Italy, Finland, Norway, Germany, Austria, the Czech Republic, and China.

The chorus also engages in fund-raising and community service. In January 2011, girls gathered to sing at a memorial to victims of the Tucson shooting.

The Tucson Girls Chorus is a member of the Arizona Choral Arts Association. It maintains its headquarters in the George Mehl Family Foothills Park in northeast Tucson.

== Personnel ==
The Tucson Girls Chorus was originally geared to girls in grades 2 through 8, but by 2003 had broadened its membership to encompass girls ages 6 to 18. Girls are divided into the following choirs:

- Bumblebees (kindergarten and first grade)
- Ladybugs (2nd and 3rd grades)
- Hummingbirds (4th and 5th grades)
- Mariposa Singers (6th and 7th grades)
- Jubilate (8th and 9th grades)
- Advanced Choir (9th through 12th grades)

An alumni choir was formed in 2013.

In 2013–2014, the organization inaugurated four satellite choirs to service girls in low-income communities. These are located in Downtown Tucson, Sahuarita, Green Valley, and on the Pascua Yaqui Reservation. Called Engagement Choirs, they offer lower tuition rates and the opportunity for rehearsals closer to home. The Engagement Choirs perform with the other ensembles at the chorus' main local concerts.

In 2017, the chorus opened a co-educational satellite choir for children with special needs. Called the Tutti Choir, it is led by a board-certified music therapist who engages the children in "sensory-enriched music theory and vocal classes". The Tutti Choir is open to girls and boys in grades 2 through 8 and is the first public choir in the city servicing children with physical and learning disabilities.

== Leadership ==
- Margie Kersey (1985–2005)
- Marcela Molina (2006–present)

== Awards and honors ==
In 2017, the Tucson Girls Chorus received the Copper Cactus Award from the Tucson Metro Chamber of Commerce.

== Discography ==
The Tucson Girls Chorus has produced these CDs:

- Winter Waves (2015)
- Transcendent Voices (2012)
- Homeward Bound (2002)
- Gift of the Holidays (2000)
- United Kingdom Tour (1999)

== See also ==
- Tucson Arizona Boys Chorus
