= Dunbeath =

Coordinates: 58.249314°N 3.431925°W

Dunbeath: Scottish Gaelic: Dùn Bheithe
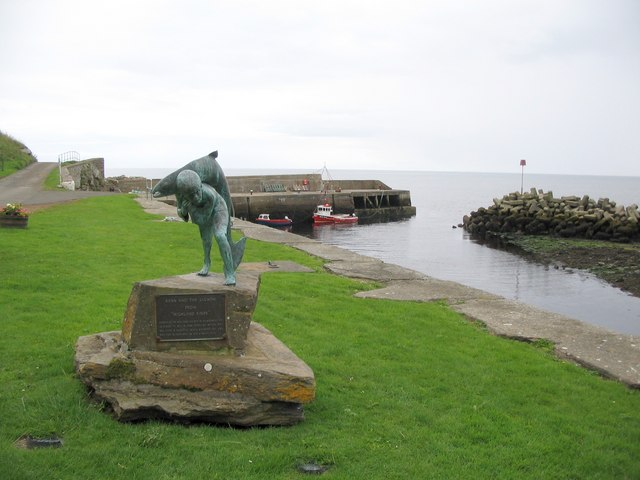
- Kenn and the Salmon, a statue in memory of Neil Gunn at Dunbeath harbour

- Location within the Caithness area
- OS grid reference: ND160298
- Civil parish: Latheron
- Council area: Highland
- Lieutenancy area: Caithness
- Country: Scotland
- Sovereign state: United Kingdom
- Post town: DUNBEATH
- Postcode district: KW6
- Dialling code: 01593
- Police: Scotland
- Fire: Scottish
- Ambulance: Scottish
- UK Parliament: Caithness, Sutherland and Easter Ross
- Scottish Parliament: Caithness, Sutherland and Ross

Dunbeath (Scottish Gaelic: Dùn Bheithe) is a village in south-east Caithness, Scotland on the A9 road. It sits astride the Dunbeath Water just before it enters the sea at Dunbeath Bay. Berriedale lies to the south and Latheronwheel to the north-east.

Dunbeath has a very rich archaeological landscape, the site of numerous Iron Age brochs and an early medieval monastic site (see Alex Morrison's archaeological survey, "Dunbeath: A Cultural Landscape".)

There is a community museum/landscape interpretation centre at the old village school (http://www.dunbeath-heritage.org.uk).

== History ==
Dunbeath as a developed settlement primarily dates from the 1790s as it was developed as a coastal fishing settlement for over 80 families cleared from the nearby Strath (valley). The old road bridge was built to a design by Thomas Telford circa 1810 and later superseded by a curved concrete viaduct in the 20th century. The Main Street dates from the 1840s. The mid-19th century saw fishing reach its largest extent with up to 190 boats working out of Dunbeath; only a few boats now work out of Dunbeath, though the large harbour remains. Reporting on Dunbeath in 1907, the Annual Report of the Fishery Board states: "Near fine fishing, but awkwardly situated for getting fish into market, being seven miles from the nearest railway station.". This refers to the Wick and Lybster Light Railway, which would have been used to transport the fish to market in Wick. Fishing in smaller ports such as Dunbeath declined in the early years of the 20th Century as the industry became more capital-intensive.

Fishery Statistics

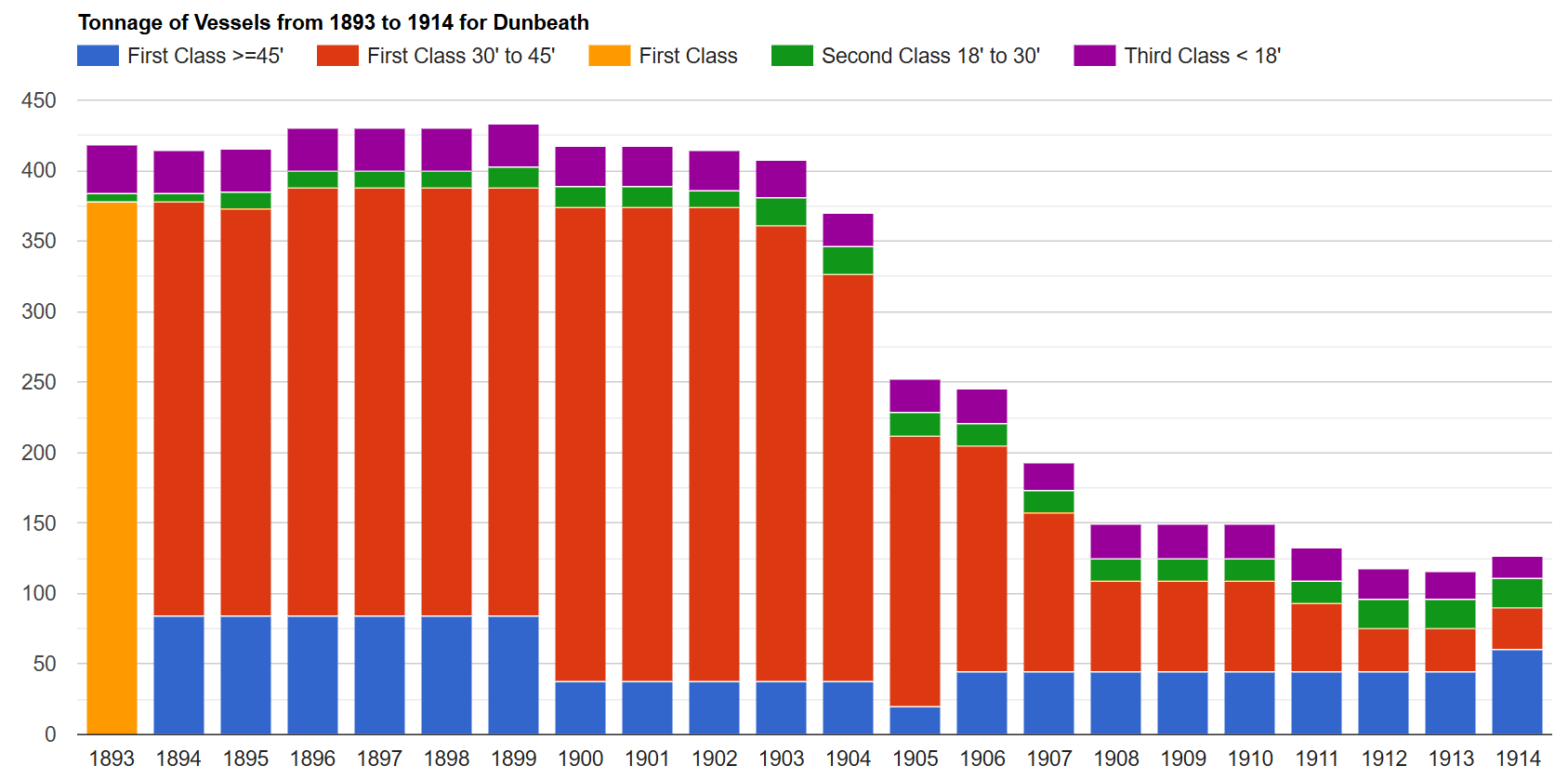
Tonnage of vessels

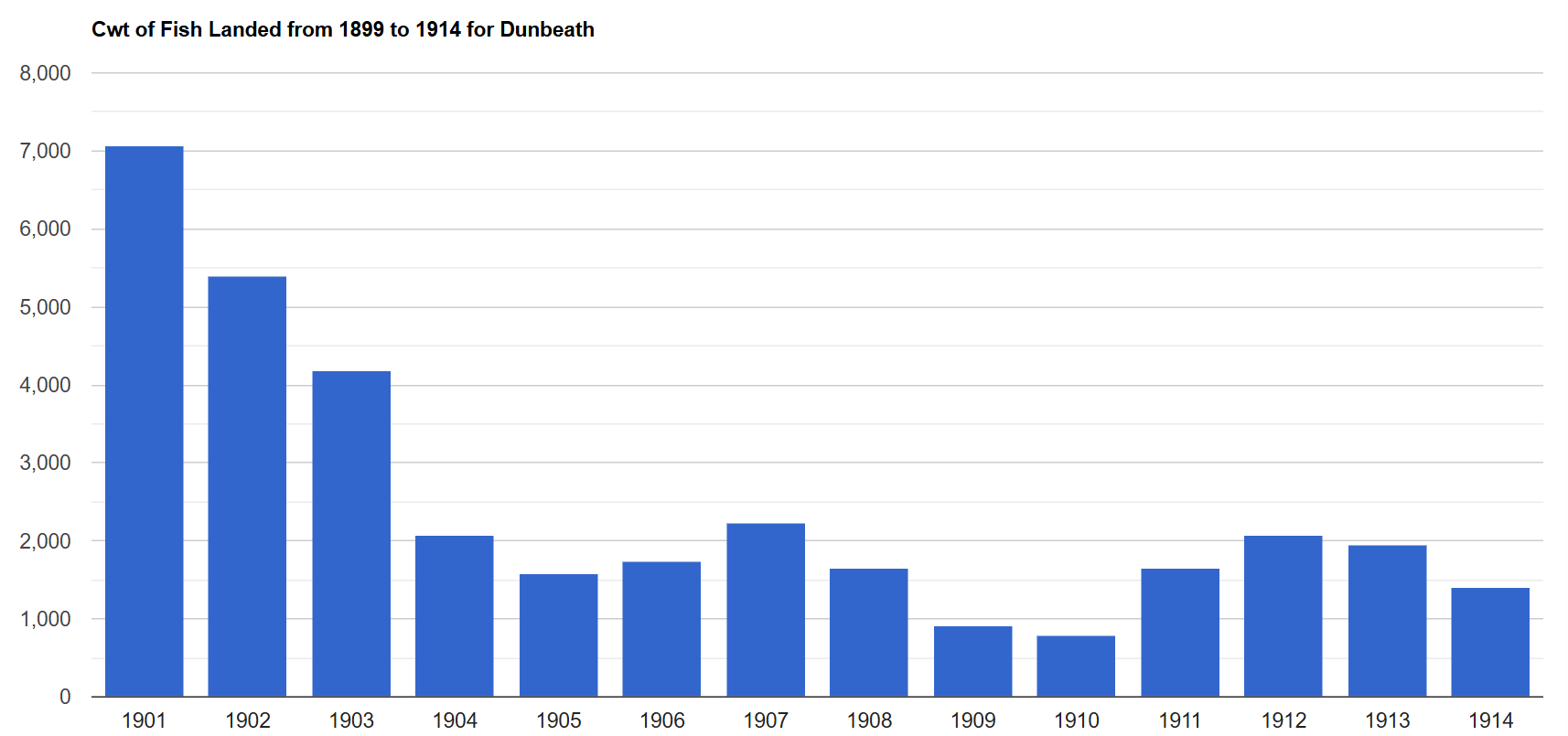
Cwt of fish landed

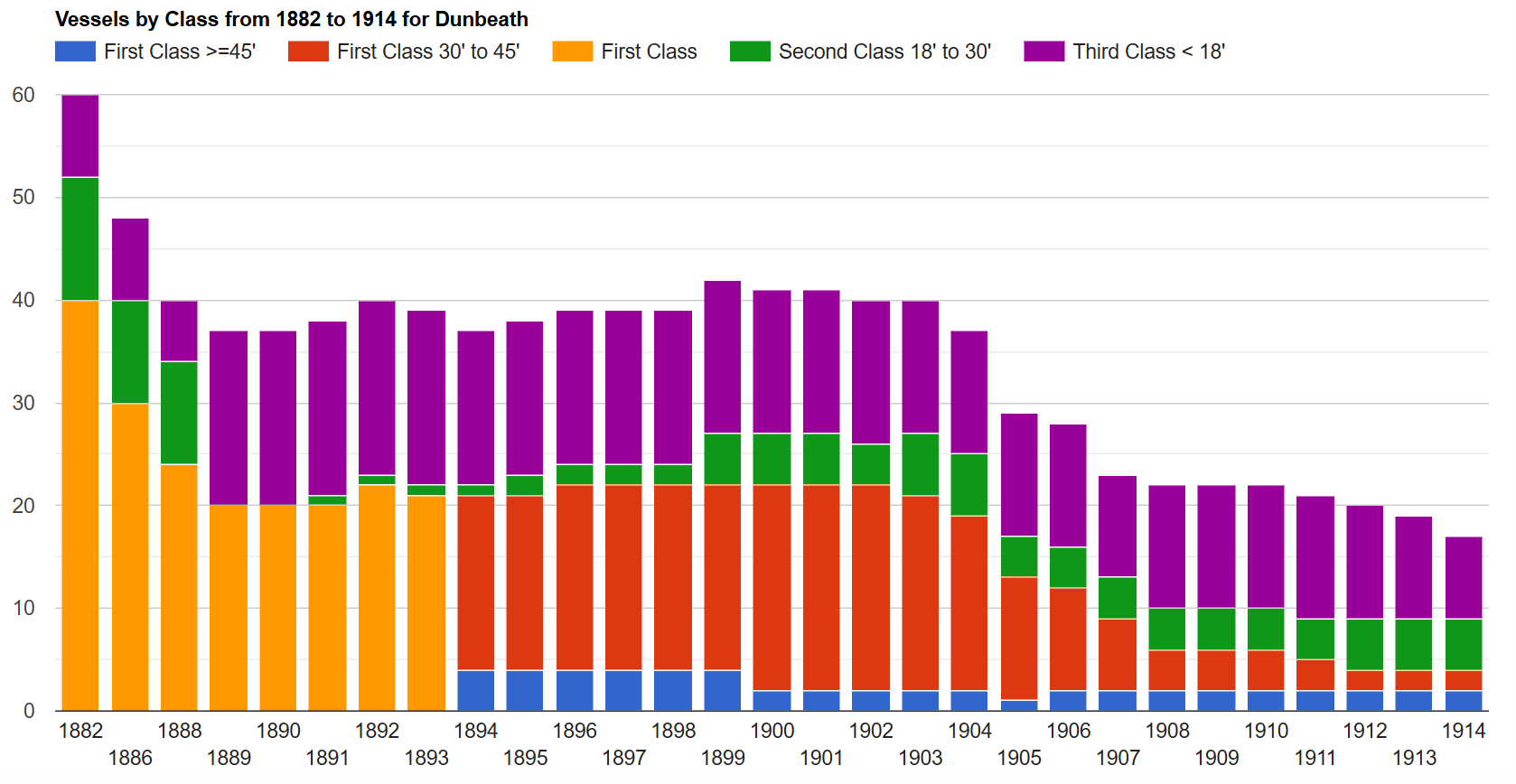
Vessels by class

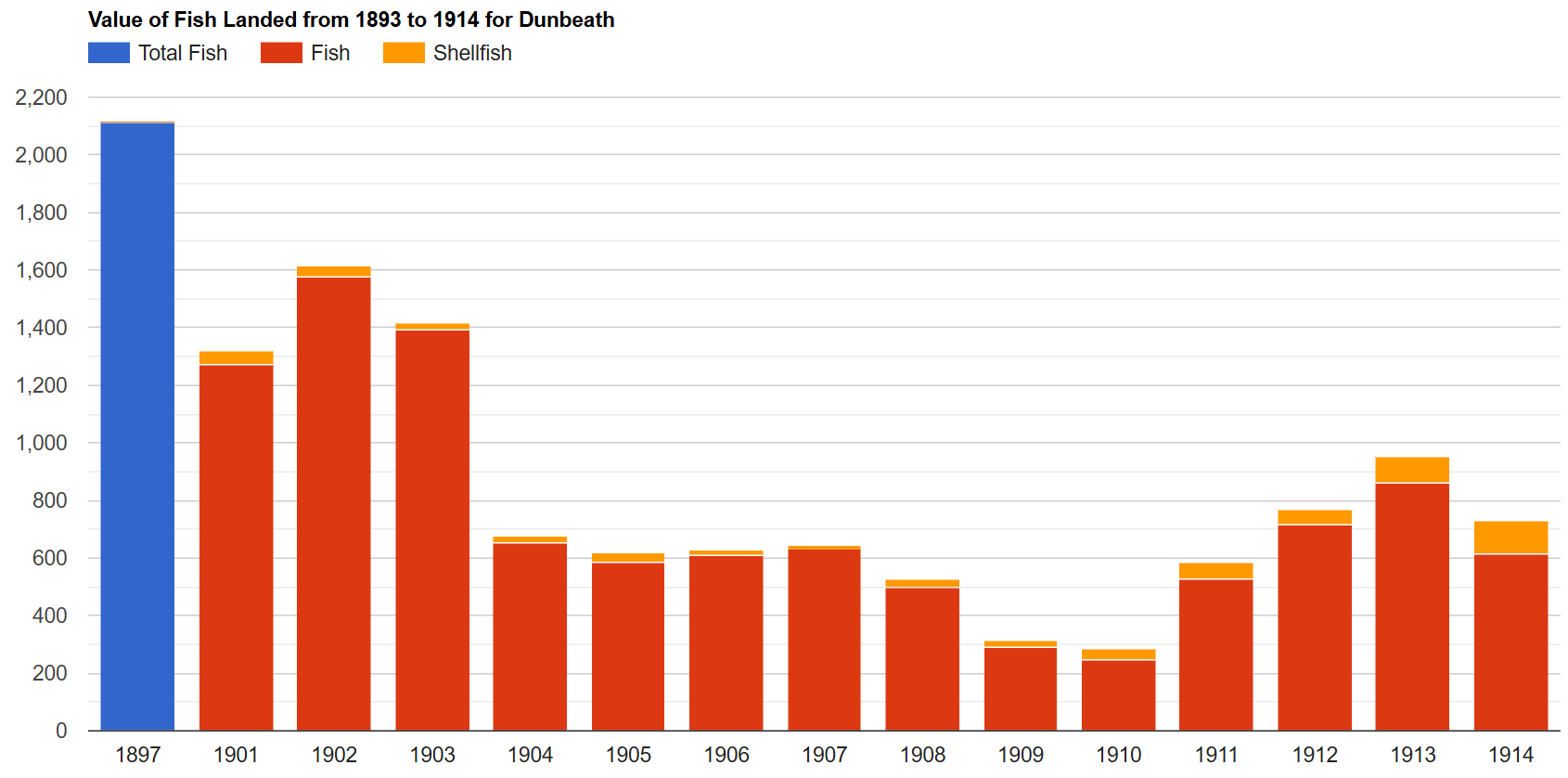
Value (£) of fish landed

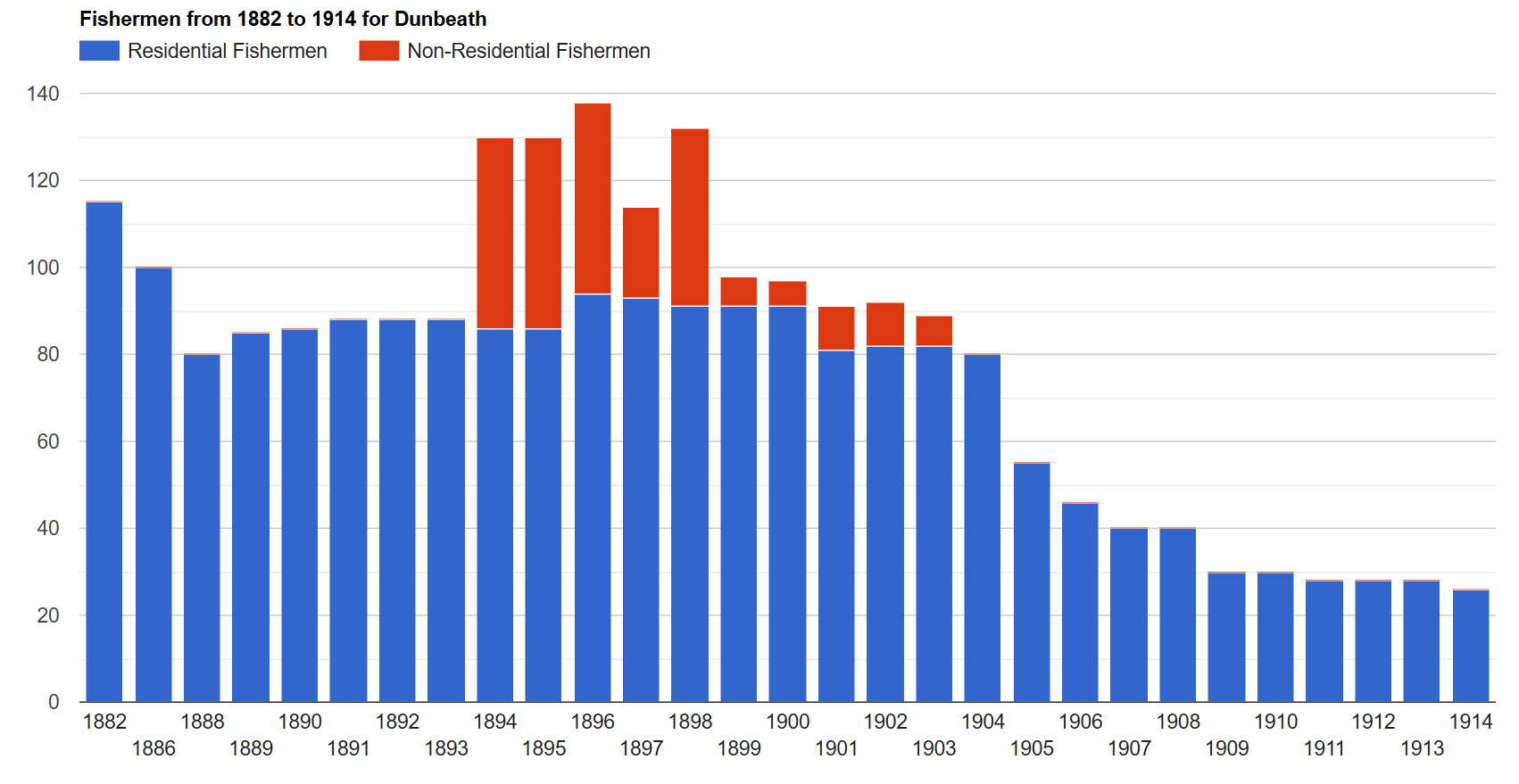
Fishermen

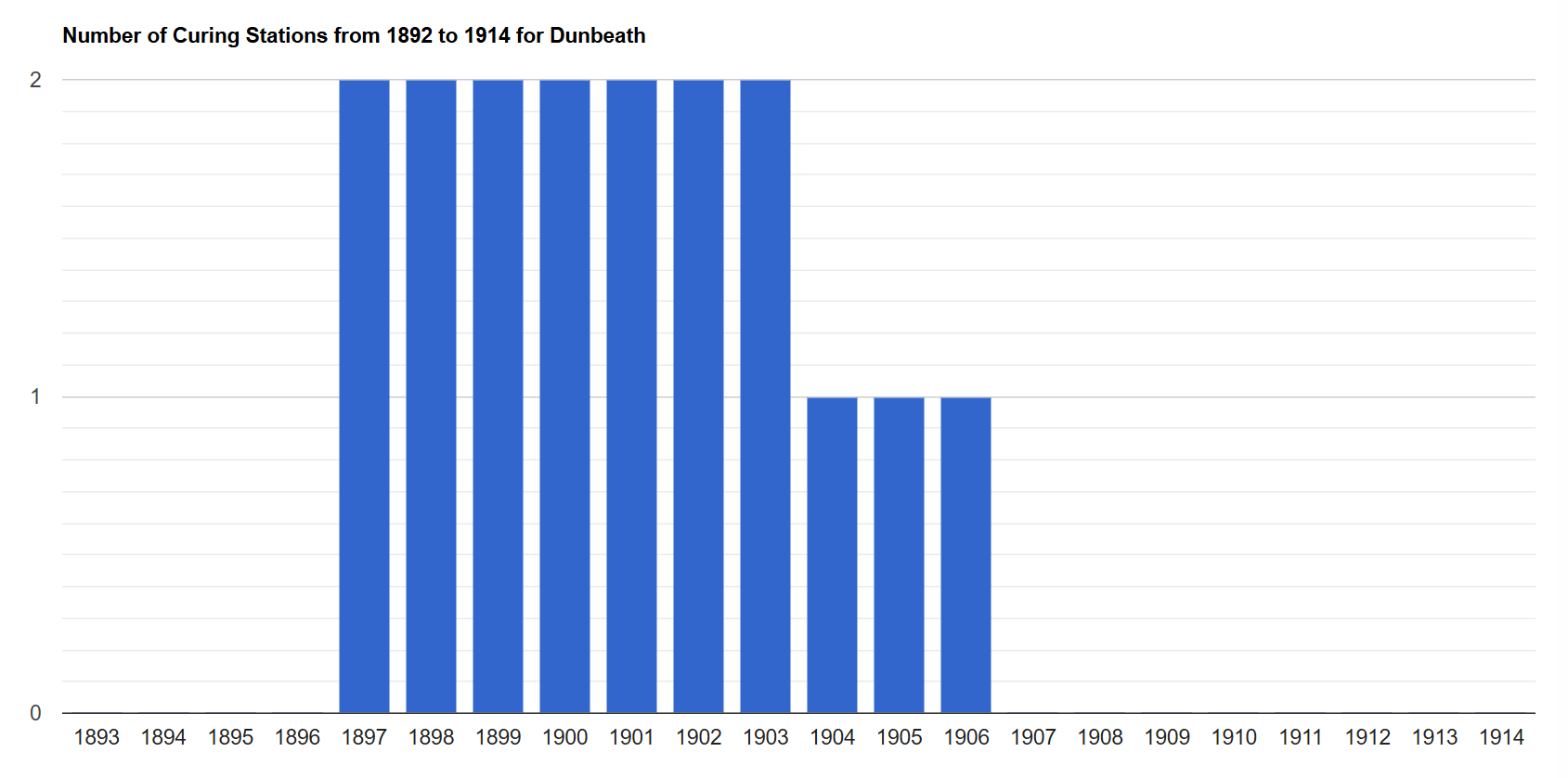
Number of curing stations

Prince George, Duke of Kent, was killed when his Short Sunderland flying boat crashed on a Dunbeath hillside on 25 August 1942.

== Notable people ==
Dunbeath was the birthplace of Neil M. Gunn (1891–1973), author of Highland River and other novels. Many of Gunn's novels are set in Dunbeath and its Strath. Of Dunbeath's landscape, Gunn wrote: "These small straths, like the Strath of Dunbeath, have this intimate beauty. In boyhood we get to know every square yard of it. We encompass it physically and our memories hold it. Birches, hazel trees for nutting, pools with trout and an occasionally visible salmon, river-flats with the wind on the bracken and disappearing rabbit scuts, a wealth of wild flower and small bird life, the soaring hawk, the unexpected roe, the ancient graveyard, thoughts of the folk who once lived far inland in straths and hollows, the past and the present held in a moment of day-dream." ('My Bit of Britain', 1941).
