= Neil M. Gunn =

Scottish novelist, critic, and dramatist (1891–1973)

- Born: Neil Miller Gunn; 8 November 1891; Dunbeath, Caithness, Scotland
- Died: 15 January 1973 (aged 81)
- Occupation: Novelist
- Spouse: Jessie Dallas Frew (m. 1921–
- Writing career
- Genre: general fiction
- Subject: Scottish Highlands
- Notable work: The Silver Darlings (1941)
- Notable awards: James Tait Black Memorial Prize for fiction
- Movement: 20th century Scottish Renaissance
- Website: neilgunn.org.uk

Neil Miller Gunn (8 November 1891 – 15 January 1973) was a prolific Scottish novelist, critic, and dramatist who emerged as one of the leading lights of the Scottish Renaissance of the 1920s and 1930s. With over twenty novels to his credit, Gunn was arguably the most influential Scottish fiction writer of the first half of the 20th century (with the possible exception of Lewis Grassic Gibbon, the pen name of James Leslie Mitchell).

Like his contemporary, Hugh MacDiarmid, Gunn was politically committed to the ideals of both Scottish nationalism and socialism (a difficult balance to maintain for a writer of his time). His fiction deals primarily with the Highland communities and landscapes of his youth, though the author chose (contra MacDiarmid and his followers) to write almost exclusively in English rather than Scots or Gaelic but was heavily influenced in his writing style by the language.

== Early life ==
Neil Miller Gunn was born in the village of Dunbeath, Caithness. His father was the captain of a herring boat, and Gunn's fascination with the sea and the courage of fishermen can be traced directly back to his childhood memories of his father's work. His mother would also provide Gunn with a crucial model for the types of steadfast, earthy, and tradition-bearing women that would populate many of his works.

Gunn had eight siblings, and when his primary schooling was completed in 1904, he moved south to live with his older sister Mary and her husband Dr. Keiller, the local GP at Kenbank in St John's Town of Dalry, Kirkcudbrightshire. He continued his education there with tutors including the local schoolmaster, and the writer and poet J.G.Carter "Theodore Mayne". He sat the Civil Service exam in 1907. This led to a move to London, where the adolescent Gunn was exposed to both the exciting world of new political and philosophical ideas as well as to the seamier side of modern urban life. In 1910 Gunn became a Customs and Excise Officer and was posted back to the Highlands. He would remain a customs officer throughout the First World War and until he was well established as a writer in 1937.

== Marriage ==
Gunn married Jessie Dallas Frew in Wigan in 1921 and they settled in Inverness, near his permanent excise post at the Glen Mhor distillery.

== Beginnings as a writer ==
During the 1920s Gunn began to publish short stories, as well as poems and short essays, in various literary magazines. He also wrote a number of plays. His The Ancient Fire was staged at the Lyric Theatre in Glasgow in 1929. His writing brought him into contact with other writers associated with the budding Scottish Renaissance, such as Hugh MacDiarmid, James Bridie, Naomi Mitchison, Eric Linklater, Edwin Muir, Lewis Grassic Gibbon, and George Blake.

Blake and George Malcolm Thomson were running the Porpoise Press, whose mission was to reestablish a national publishing industry for Scotland, by now an imprint of Faber & Faber, and they became Gunn's publisher in the early 1930s. The first novels Gunn published were The Grey Coast in 1926 and The Lost Glen in 1928. During this period, Gunn was active in the National Party of Scotland, which formed part of what became the Scottish National Party.

== The professional writer ==
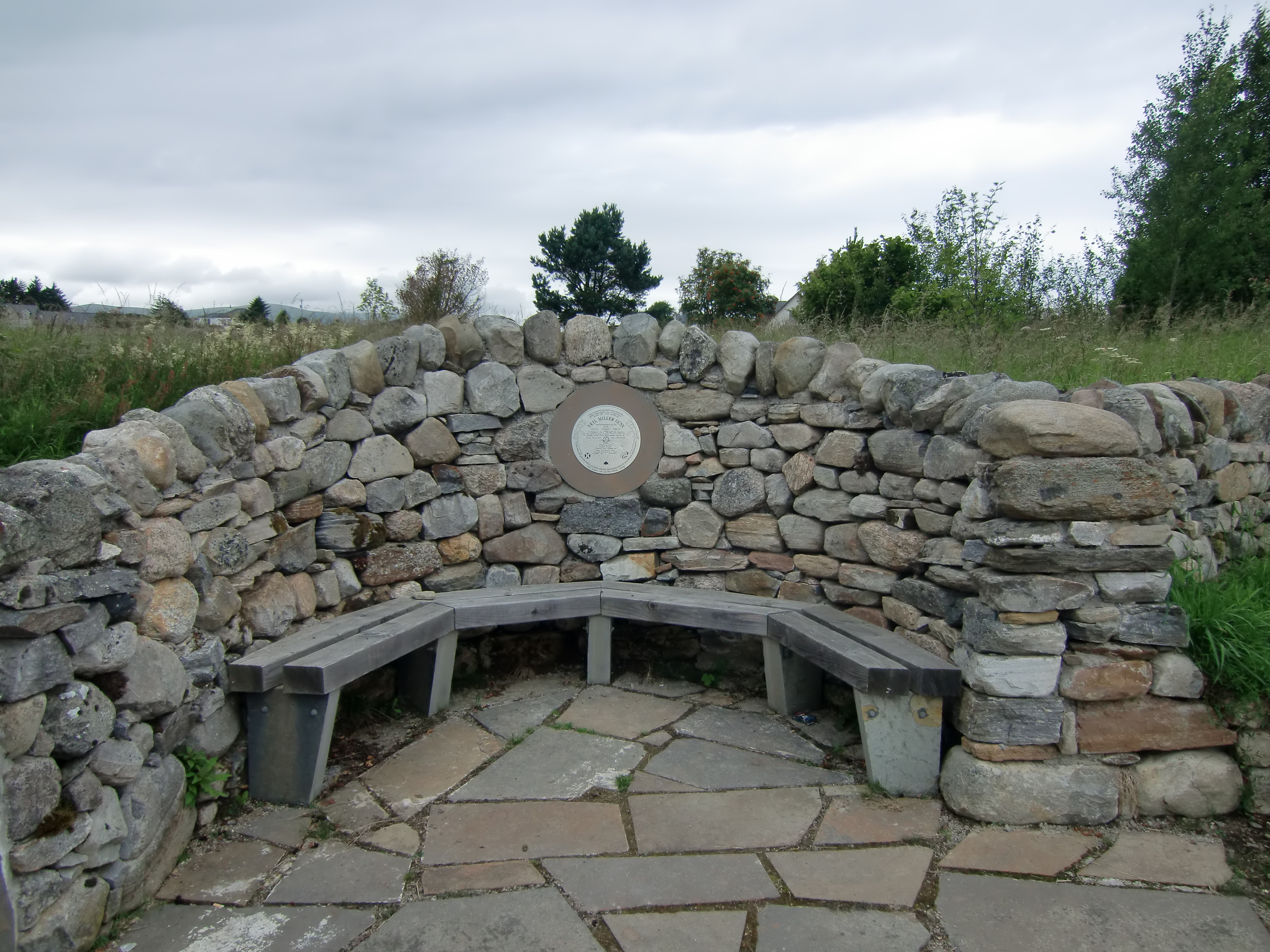
Part of the Neil Gunn memorial above Strathpeffer, erected by the Neil M. Gunn Memorial Trust.

Following the publishing success of Highland River (for which he was awarded the 1937 James Tait Black Memorial Prize for fiction), Gunn was able to resign from the Customs and Excise in 1937 and become a full-time writer. He rented a farmhouse near Strathpeffer and embarked on his most productive period as a novelist and essayist. Butcher's Broom and The Silver Darlings are historical novels dealing with the Highland Clearances. Young Art and Old Hector and The Green Isle of the Great Deep are both fantasies based on Scottish folklore. Gunn's later works in the 1940s and into the 1950s became concerned with issues of totalitarianism.

== The Highland Zen master ==
Gunn's final full-length work was a discursive autobiography entitled The Atom of Delight. This text showed the influence which a reading of Eugen Herrigel's Zen in the Art of Archery had upon Gunn. His utilisation of these ideas was not so much mystical as providing a view of the individual in a "small self-contained community, with a long-established way of life, with actions and responses known and defined". He took the playing of fiddle reels as an example: "how a human hand could perform, on its own, truly astonishing feats – astonishing in the sense that if thought interfered for a moment the feat was destroyed". This thought-free state could be a source of delight.Zen in the art of Neil Gunn

In his later years, Gunn was involved in broadcasting and also published in diverse journals such as Anarchy Magazine in London, The Glasgow Herald, Holiday (USA), Saltire Review, Scotland's Magazine, Scots Review, and Point magazine in Leicester.

In his later years Gunn lived on the Black Isle. He died in Raigmore Hospital in Inverness on 15 January 1973, aged 81.

== Legacy ==
Gunn is commemorated in Makars' Court, outside the Writers' Museum, Lawnmarket, Edinburgh. Selections for Makars' Court are made by the Writers' Museum; the Saltire Society; the Scottish Poetry Library. The Neil Gunn Trust was established in 1986, and in October 1987 a monument to the writer was unveiled on the Heights of Brae, Strathpeffer.

The Neil Gunn Writing Competition was established in 1988 by Ross & Cromarty District Council (later becoming the Highland Council) and the Trust. The competition is now organised by High Life Highland and the Trust.

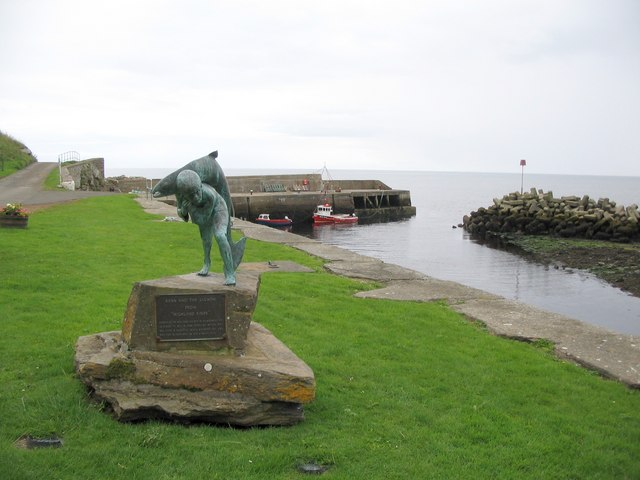
Kenn and the Salmon, from the characters in Highland River, a statue erected in memory of Neil Gunn at Dunbeath

== Bibliography ==
Novels

- The Grey Coast (1926)
- The Lost Glen (1928)
- Morning Tide (1931)
- The Poaching at Grianan (1930 as serial in Scots Magazine) (2005)
- Sun Circle (1933)
- Butcher's Broom (1934) (1935 American printing under title Highland Night)
- Highland River (1937)
- Wild Geese Overhead (1939)
- Second Sight (1940)
- The Silver Darlings (1941) (filmed in 1947)
- Young Art and Old Hector (1942)
- The Serpent (1943)
- The Green Isle of the Great Deep (1944)
- The Key of the Chest (1945)
- The Drinking Well (1946)
- The Silver Bough (1948)
- The Shadow (1948)
- The Lost Chart (1949)
- The Well at the World's End (1951)
- Blood Hunt (1952) (adapted for television in 1986)
- The Other Landscape (1954)

Short stories

- Hidden Doors (1929)
- The White Hour (1950)
- The Tax-Gatherer

Essays and autobiography

- Whisky and Scotland (1935)
- Off in a Boat (1938)
- Highland Pack (1949)
- The Atom of Delight (1956)

Plays

- The Ancient Fire (1929)

== Literary criticism ==
- Burns, John, Neil M. Gunn: Celebration of the Light, in Hearn, Sheila G. (ed.), Cencrastus No. 11, New Year 1983, pp. 29 – 31, ISSN 0264-0856
- Burns, John, Celebration of the Light: Zen in the Novels of Neil M. Gunn, Edinburgh: Canongate, 1988
- Gifford, Douglas, Neil M. Gunn and Lewis Grassic Gibbon. Edinburgh: Oliver and Boyd, 1983, ISBN 9780050031988
- Laplace, Philippe, Les Hautes-Terres, l'histoire et la mémoire dans les romans de Neil M. Gunn. Besançon: PUFC, 2006
- McCulloch, Margery, The Novels of Neil M. Gunn: A Critical Study. Edinburgh: Scottish Academic Press, 1987
- Price, Richard, The Fabulous Matter of Fact: The Poetics of Neil M. Gunn. Edinburgh University Press, 1991
- Price, Richard, "Argument and Innovation in the Work of Neil M. Gunn", in Dunn, Angus (ed.), Northwords Issue 1, Autumn 1991, pp. 46 - 48, ISSN 0964-6876
- Scott, Alexander and Gifford, Douglas, Neil M. Gunn: The Man and the Writer. Edinburgh: Blackwood, 1973
