= The Green Isle of the Great Deep =

Book by Neil M. Gunn

- First edition
- Author: Neil M. Gunn
- Language: English
- Published: 1944 (Faber & Faber)
- Publication place: Scotland
- Media type: Print (Paperback)
- Pages: 256 pp (first edition, hardback)
- ISBN: 1-904598-68-4 (Polygon 2006 Edition)
- Preceded by: Young Art and Old Hector
- Followed by: The Serpent

The Green Isle of the Great Deep is a 1944 dystopian novel by Neil M. Gunn. Whilst the book features two protagonists from his previous novel, Young Art and Old Hector, Gunn transports the characters into an allegory about totalitarianism and the nature of freedom and legend.

== Plot ==
Young Art and Old Hector are sitting in the kitchen, whilst the characters from the previous book discuss the atrocities occurring in mainland Europe. They then embark on a poaching trip to the Hazel Pool, a location which had great import in their previous adventure. Hector regales Art with tales of the Celtic Otherworld, the eponymous "Green Isle of the Great Deep" and of the supreme legend of the nuts of knowledge falling into the pool of life and being swallowed by the salmon of wisdom. However, both Art and Hector get into difficulty in the Pool and both seemingly drown in the deep waters.

They awake in an alternative Highland universe called the Green Isle. This place is beautiful and fertile but although the land is abundant and the trees ripe with fruit, no one is allowed to touch the fruit and those that eat it fall ill. However, the advent of Art in the island, who proceeds to eat the fruit and then become a fugitive, causes a ripple effect which steadily causes the strict social hierarchy who live at the Seat on the Rock to slowly crumble and for God to awake. Hector demands an audience with God.

Another principal character is Mary, who possesses an elixir which allows her and her husband, Robert, to eat the fruit of the trees.

== Themes ==
Whilst the adventure that allows Gunn to ponder the question of how God could allow the Nazis to inflict their atrocities and subdue a people into doing their bidding the story can also reflect the situation in the Highlands concerning the landlords having feudal control of the land and therefore a great deal of control over their tenants' lives.

In Hector's dialogue with God, two major themes are explored; the concept of knowledge without wisdom leading to a separation of the intellect from the spirit resulting in cruelty; and the concept of the requirement for some form of effective governance tempered by prudence.

Gunn was a Scottish nationalist and believed in small nations "being humanity's last bulwark for personal expression against impersonal tyranny."

== Reception ==
Gunn himself when asked why "Green Isle" was not better known, replied, "I don't know, it was my best book."

== Adaptation ==
A two-part audio adaptation of the book by John Keir Cross was broadcast on the BBC Home Service in January 1966, with Alex MacKenzie as Old Hector and Gwyn Guthrie as Young Art. It was rebroadcast on BBC Radio 4 Extra in 2026.
