= Young Art and Old Hector =

Novel by Neil M. Gunn

- First edition
- Author: Neil M. Gunn
- Language: English
- Publisher: Faber & Faber
- Publication date: 1941
- Publication place: United Kingdom
- Media type: Print (Paperback)
- Pages: 256 pp (first edition, hardback)
- ISBN: 0-285-62254-4 (1976 new edition, paperback)
- Preceded by: The Silver Darlings
- Followed by: The Green Isle of the Great Deep

Young Art and Old Hector is a novel by Neil M. Gunn. It concerns itself with an 8-year-old boy "Young Art" growing up in the Scottish Highland community of Clachdrum and in episodic form, catalogues a series of adventures and occurrences in his life, often connected with his mentor figure "Old Hector", a local character and bootlegger. The same characters would be used in the following satirical, fantasy novel, The Green Isle of the Great Deep.

== Plot ==
Art is an eight-year-old boy and the book is seen mostly from his perspective. He comes from a large family and, as his father is often away fishing, his major father figure is Old Hector, the local elder who has a wide knowledge of local history and story and as is implied throughout the novel, then revealed in the final chapters, the finest bootlegger in the area.

Like many of Gunn's novels, the plot is episodic and we experience events such as the local Highland Games and the birth of Art's baby sister. Indeed several of the chapters appeared extant in other published forms.

The main climax of the novel is when Art, returning out of curiosity to a cave where he and a girl from the village thought a wild beast lived, uncover an illicit still run by Hector and Red Douglas (a local rascal). Art's brother Donul is also with them as they are making whisky for Duncan, Art and Donul's eldest brother's wedding. Art's discovery of the still is fortuitous as on his way he encounters three excise agents or "gaugers", who are investigating Hector.

Throughout the book, Art also wishes to reach the river, a place he has never been, initially with Donul, but when Donul needs to leave to work on a cattle farm, it is Hector who takes Art to the river.

== Themes ==
Art and Hector represent the extremes of youth and old age. The book is considered to be one of the "finest evocations of childhood ever written, conveying all the magic and misery and the bursting joys of being a small boy in a great and mysterious world."

Hector's role is one of an idealised Gaelic seanachie, his knowledge of his local area and history not limiting him in his dealing with universal issues such as greed and land rights. The area known as the Clash, where Art and Donul go to snare rabbits early in the book is where Hector was born and was cleared to the present village. The Clash is also where Hector takes the Gaugers to act as a red herring when they are making enquiries about the still.

Art's role as the hero and saviour of Hector from the Gaugers is a theme which Gunn would develop in the following fantastical novel The Green Isle of the Great Deep.

Art's triumph at the Highland Games is considered to be autobiographical due to Gunn's own talent at athletics.

== Reception ==
The Times Literary Supplement stated that Young Art and Old Hector is the book that "affirms Neil Gunn's place as one of the most important Scottish writers of the Twentieth century."
