= The Loop (Tucson) =

Metropolitan shared use paths

Coordinates: 32°13′N 110°56′W

- Shared-use path network

Details
- Location: Metropolitan Tucson, Arizona
- Operated by: Pima County, Arizona
- Usage: Cycling, walking, horseback riding
- Length: 120 mi (current); 131 mi (planned)
- Surface: Asphalt (primary); Parallel natural and asphalt paths
- Website: The Loop

System Map
- Source: Pima County, July 2015

The Loop is a network of shared-use paths in metropolitan Tucson, Arizona maintained by Pima County. Once complete it will comprise 131 miles (211 km) of paved trails dedicated to cyclist, pedestrian, and equestrian use. By 2014, the network was 85% complete, with over one hundred miles in place. Pima County estimates the Loop is used by an average of 2,000 visitors each weekday and more than 5,000 on weekends.

== Characteristics ==
All but one of the Loop's trails follow the Santa Cruz River or one of its tributaries to the east. Although rivers within the city are dry for most of the year, ground water near the surface supports a variety of wildlife. Riverbank alignment allows for trails to pass under bridges at major streets.

Many trailheads are equipped with bathrooms, drinking fountains, shade structures, benches, and parking. Horse trailer parking and decomposed granite paths which parallel the asphalt trails for significant stretches support equestrian use of the Loop.

== Routes ==
=== Santa Cruz River Park ===
The Santa Cruz River Park runs north–south on the west side of town, passing through Tucson's downtown. As of 2014, the park contained over 40 miles of paved paths, with another 22 miles (35 km) in planning or under construction. Paseo de las Iglesias, which translates to "the path between churches", a 1.5-mile (2.4 km) park that completed the link with the Julian Wash Greenway, was completed as part of a flood control project in 2015. Completed in March 2016, the Midvale Park Segment extends the west-bank path from Drexel Road to Valencia. With this addition the park extends for more than 22 miles (35 km) from Valencia to its northernmost trailhead at El Rio Park in Marana. Work to extend the park north from El Rio Park to Avra Valley road began in 2017.

=== Rillito River Park ===
The most established and highly trafficked of The Loop's six trails, with paths running on both sides of the river in all but one or two stretches, is the Rillito River Park, which runs east–west along the northern edge of Tucson following region's most significant tributary of the Santa Cruz. From where it meets the Santa Cruz near the intersection of Thornydale and the Interstate 10, the park follows the Rillito for 12 miles to Craycroft, where the river forks into the Tanque Verde and the Pantano. The park contains more than 25 miles of paved trails.

=== Julian Wash Greenway ===
Feeding into the Santa Cruz River Park's east-bank trail three miles north of its southernmost trailhead, at the edge of the City of South Tucson, is the Julian Wash Greenway, which runs to the southeast, paralleling the Interstate 10 to Rita Ranch on the city's southeast side. Completed in 2014, the park has 16.1 miles of paved trails.

=== Pantano River Park ===
The Pantano River Park was the last piece in the continuous circuit of trails around the city of Tucson to be completed. It now runs from the Rillito trail at Craycroft Road, south-south-east to the Harrison Greenway connection at Sellarole Road.

=== Harrison Greenway ===
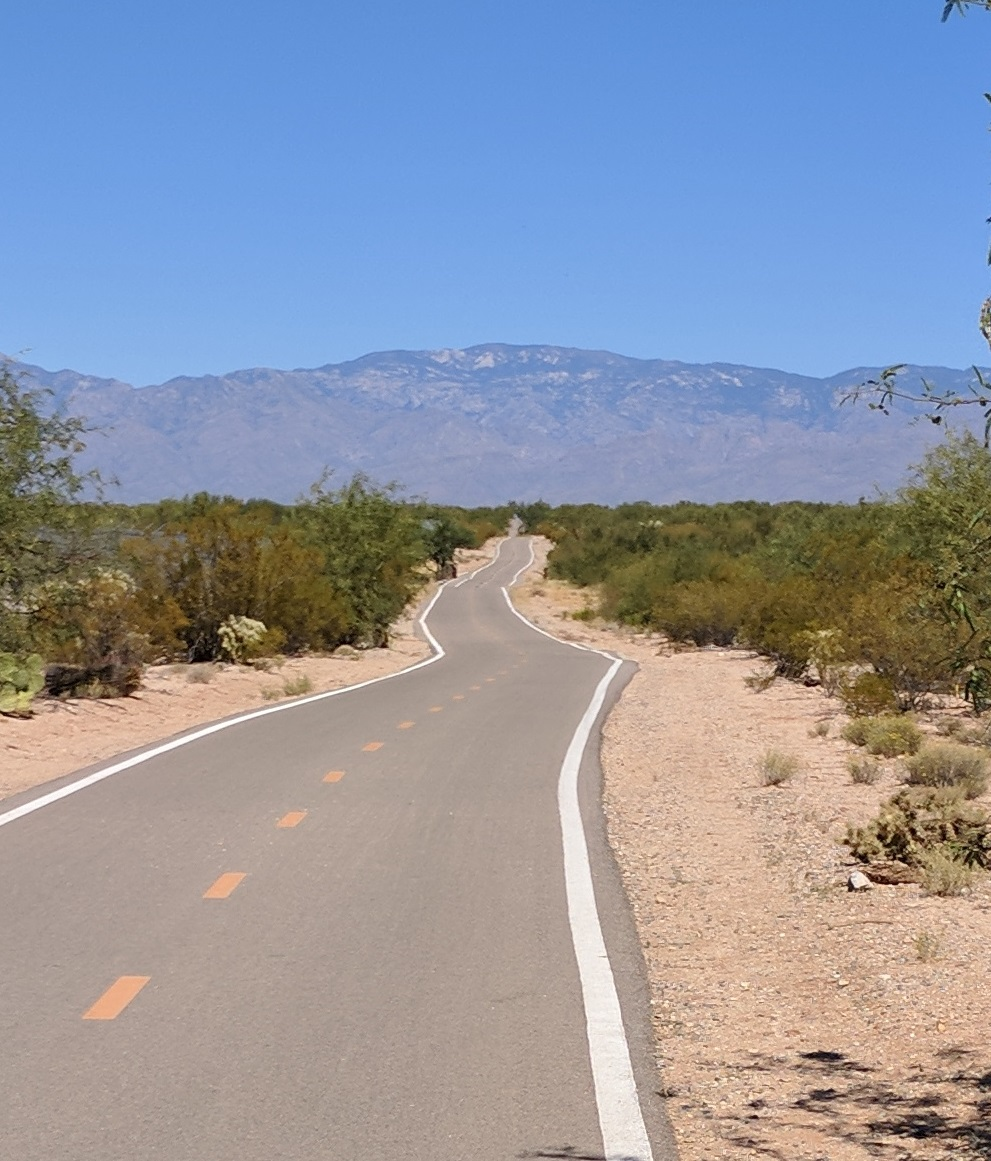
Looking north along the Harrison Greenway

The Harrison Greenway, the only stretch of the Loop that does not follow a watercourse, provides a link between the Pantano River Park and the Julian Wash Greenway. Its trail parallels Harrison Road for 1.3 miles from Sellarole to Irvington. From here it continues south for three miles through undeveloped desert east of the Davis Monthan Air Force Base reserve. It then crosses Valencia Road before continuing through a residential area to Rita Road. A 1.5-mile on-street section of the Loop using Rita Road bike lanes leads to the easternmost trailhead of the Julian Wash Greenway.

=== Cañada del Oro River Park ===
The Cañada del Oro River Park leads north-east from its intersection with the Santa Cruz Park through Casas Adobes into Oro Valley. It is one of two major Loop feeder trails leading north from the intersection of the Santa Cruz and Rillito River Parks, the other one being the continuation of the Santa Cruz River Park itself, which leads both north-west through the City of Marana, and south to Valencia Road. A 1.6-mile section of the trail scheduled to be completed in 2017 will bring the CDO linear park's continuous length to 7.3 miles.
