= Lectionary 18 =

Lectionary ℓ 18
- New Testament manuscript
- Name: Bodleianus 4
- Text: Evangelistarion
- Date: 12th-century
- Script: Greek
- Now at: Bodleian Library
- Size: 30.5 cm by 25 cm

Lectionary 18, designated by siglum ℓ 18 (in the Gregory-Aland numbering). It is a Greek manuscript of the New Testament, on vellum leaves. Palaeographically it has been assigned to the 12th-century.

== Description ==
The codex contains Lessons from the Gospels of John, Matthew, Luke lectionary (Evangelistarium), with numerous lacunae. The text is written in Greek minuscule letters, on 276 parchment leaves (30.5 cm by 25 cm), 2 columns per page, 21-24 lines per page. Beginning of lectionary in John 4:53.

It was added to the list of the New Testament manuscripts by Johann Jakob Wettstein. It was partially examined by Mill (Bodleianus 4) and Griesbach.

The manuscript is sporadically cited in the critical editions of the Greek New Testament (UBS3).

Currently the codex is located in the Bodleian Library (Laud. Gr. 32) in Oxford.

== See also ==
- List of New Testament lectionaries
- Biblical manuscript
- Textual criticism

== Bibliography ==
- Gregory, Caspar René (1900). Textkritik des Neuen Testaments. Vol. 1. Leipzig: J.C. Hinrichs. p. 388.
