= Tucson Arizona Boys Chorus =

Choir

- Choir
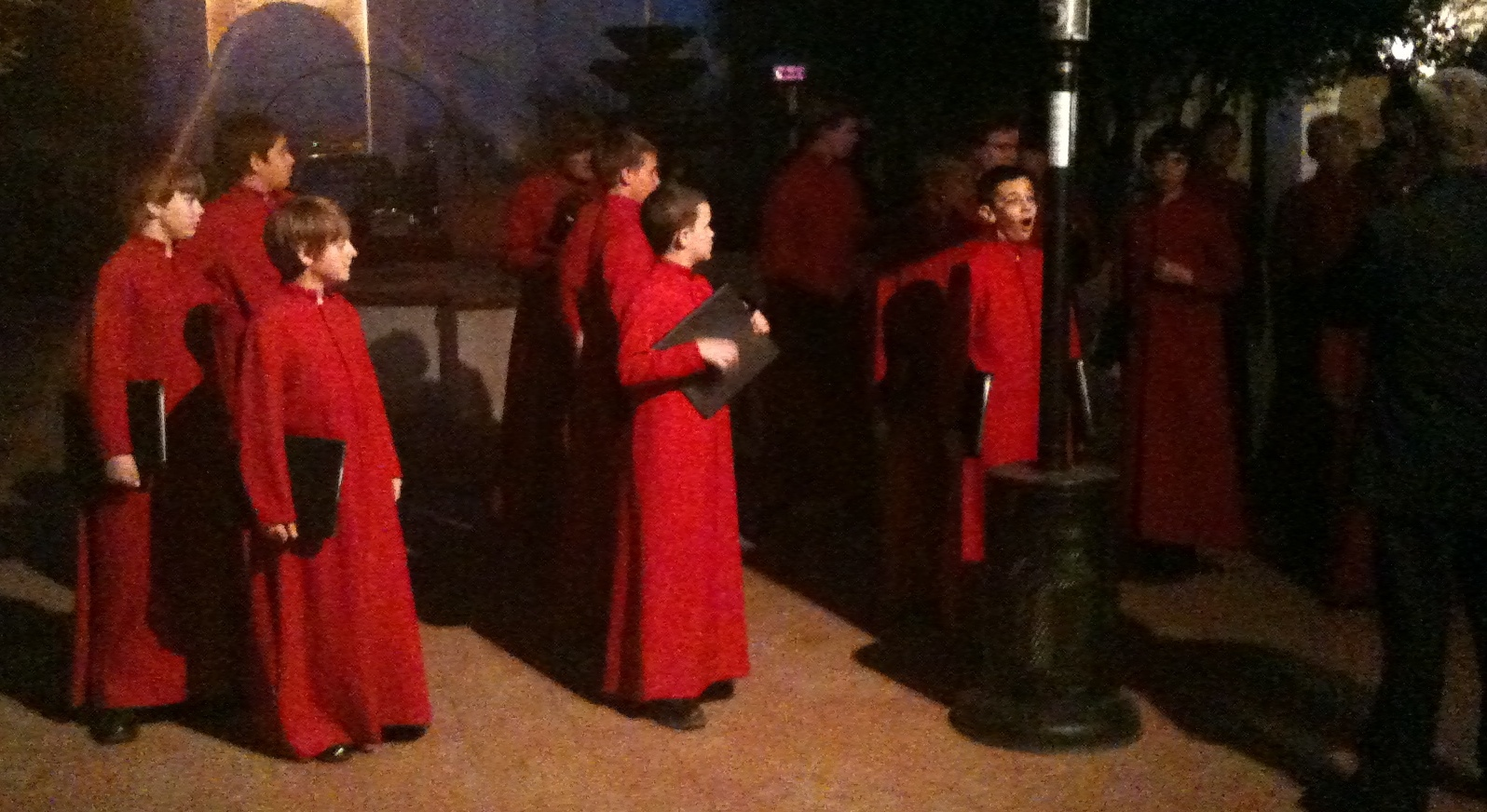
- Chorus members before their 2009 concert at Mission San Xavier del Bac
- Founded: 1939
- Founder: Eduardo Caso
- Genre: Folk songs, Western ballads, Mexican songs, Christmas carols, spirituals, pop music, classical music, Broadway show tunes, American patriotic songs
- Members: 150
- Notable members: John Denver; George Chakiris
- Music director: Dr. Julian Ackerley

The Tucson Arizona Boys Chorus is a boys' choir based in Tucson, Arizona, which performs locally, nationally, and internationally. Founded in 1939 and incorporated as a non-profit educational organization in 1945, its mission is to facilitate music education and social development among Tucson youth ages 6 to 21. The chorus, presently numbering 150 members, sends out touring companies of 30 boys each who sing folk songs, Western ballads, Mexican songs, Christmas carols, spirituals, pop music, classical music, Broadway show tunes, and American patriotic songs. The boys also perform rope tricks. The chorus has performed in major venues around the world as well as on television and radio, and in collaboration with symphony orchestras and arts organizations. It has released albums both under its own label, TABC Records, and with Capitol Records, United Artists, and C.P. MacGregor.

== History ==
The Tucson Arizona Boys Chorus was founded by Eduardo Caso in 1939. Caso, an English tenor who performed on radio, was forced to quit his professional career when diagnosed with tuberculosis; he recuperated at a sanitorium in Tucson. Caso formed the chorus in the tradition of European boys choirs, with the added flavor of the American Southwest. Originally composed of eight members, (Note: Two girls joined the choir for their first Christmas Eve concert in 1939.) the choir was also known as "Caso's Singing Cowboys". The boys dressed in Levi's jeans, cowboy shirts, and cowboy hats, and performed songs as well as rope tricks.

Caso was said to manage both the boys and their parents effectively. The chorus grew to about 30 members and began touring in the United States. After a well-received performance at the 1950 Chicago World's Fair, they toured Europe in 1955 and Australia in 1960. They appeared on The Ed Sullivan Show in 1951 and 1955, on The George Gobel Show in 1959, and on The Bell Telephone Hour in 1966. In 1963 they sang before President Lyndon Johnson at the White House Christmas tree lighting ceremony.

By 1966, the chorus had appeared in more than 2,000 concerts in the United States, Canada, Europe, and Australia. In the mid- to late-1960s, the group was profiled in a University of Arizona film, Ambassadors in Levis: The Tucson Arizona Boys Chorus, which has been preserved by the National Film Preservation Foundation.

With the appointment of Dr. Julian Ackerley as director in 1980, the chorus expanded both its membership and reach. Ackerley brought to the group a university-level education in music education, choral direction, and voice performance. (Note: In 1983, Ackerley submitted his dissertation for his Doctor of Musical Arts degree at the University of Arizona on the subject "Tucson Arizona Boys Chorus: A History".) The chorus began collaborating with national symphony orchestras and arts organizations, appeared on radio and television, and released numerous albums. They performed at the AmericaFest festival, the American Choral Directors Association conference, the World Symposium on Choral Music, the International Children's Choir Festival, the Macy's Thanksgiving Day Parade, and with the Mormon Tabernacle Choir. They also appeared at the Kennedy Center, the Lincoln Center, the Beijing Institute of Culture, and the Sydney Opera House. A wider touring schedule saw them performing in the United States, Canada, Mexico, Western Europe, Eastern Europe, Kazakhstan, China, Hong Kong, Japan, Korea, Vietnam, Taiwan, Thailand, and South Africa.

To mark their 50th anniversary in 1989, the chorus held an alumni reunion, banquet, and family picnic for current and former members. The chorus then embarked on a major European tour in early 1990 to the Soviet Union, Poland, East Germany, West Germany, and Austria. In 1991, they sang before President George H. W. Bush at another White House Christmas tree lighting event.

Overseas tours, scheduled in the summer, extend up to three weeks, while U.S. concert tours run for a maximum of four weeks. The chorus performs locally in Tucson between October and May. It appears in an annual sold-out Christmas concert with the Sons of Orpheus at the Mission San Xavier del Bac in Tucson.

In 2017, the chorus added three neighborhood choral groups in order to allow more boys to rehearse closer to their homes.

The Tucson Arizona Boys Chorus is a member of the Arizona Choral Arts Association.

== Musical style ==
The chorus' repertoire includes folk songs, Western ballads, Mexican songs, Christmas carols, spirituals, pop music, classical music, Broadway show tunes, and American patriotic songs. The singers are choreographed and are principally accompanied by staff pianist Marie Sierra. They often perform the Western standards "Ghost Riders in the Sky", "Cool Water", and "Ragtime Cowboy Joe", and perform rope tricks during their Western songs. They have sung vespers and mass at St. Mark Catholic Church in Oro Valley, Arizona.

== Personnel ==
The chorus was incorporated as a non-profit educational organization in 1945. Its stated mission is to facilitate both music education and social development among Tucson youth ages 6 to 21.

By 1967, the chorus was composed of more than 100 members aged 8 to 16. By 2009, the group's 75th anniversary year, membership stood at 150 boys. The current structure provides five different levels for participation. Boys as young as 6 can join the Cadet Choir. All members must join the Training Chorus, which teaches boys aged 8–11 basic vocal skills. The intermediate level, called TowneSingers, performs locally in concert and for service organizations. Middle school students can join the Touring Chorus, which performs in groups of 30 nationally and internationally. A fifth level, the Tucson Arizona Young Men's Ensemble, accommodates high school and college-age young men aged 15–21 whose voices have deepened. In addition, an Alumni Group has been formed for alumni of all ages. The first boy who joined the choir in 1939 was singing in the Alumni Choir in 2009 at the age of 83.

All the boys are Tucson residents. Applicants need not have great singing voices, but must be able to "match tonal pitch". The program teaches voice training and music-reading skills. Members also learn social etiquette, such as "how to shake hands properly, engage in conversation with adults, [and] be welcome guests when they travel".

Members must maintain a B average in school, with no Ds. The choir has a special arrangement with Tucson public schools to allow boys who tour during the winter to make up missed schoolwork with tutors after they return.

Notable members of the chorus have included John Denver, who resided in Tucson between 1949 and 1957 while his father was stationed at Davis–Monthan Air Force Base; actor George Chakiris; and former Tucson chief of police Peter Ronstadt (the brother of singer Linda Ronstadt).

== Leadership ==
The past and present directors of the Tucson Arizona Boys Chorus are:

- Eduardo Caso (1939–1965)
- Jeffrey Haskell (1965–1975)
- Dr. John Davis (1975–1980)
- Dr. Julian Ackerley (1980–2025)
- Dr. Jordan Rakita (2026-present)

== Fund-raising ==
The Tucson Arizona Boys Chorus has an annual administrative budget of $700,000. As of 2012, tuition was $550 for the training chorus and $800 for the touring chorus. Parents and families of the boys raise funds for scholarships by selling discount coupon books and operating an annual Christmas tree lot. Parents also raise funds to pay for their sons' overseas tours, which run in the thousands of dollars.

== Selected discography ==
The Tucson Arizona Boys Chorus has released albums under its own label, TABC Records, as well as Capitol Records, United Artists, and C.P. MacGregor. Albums feature "American popular music, Western ballads, patriotic favorites, Christmas and Hanukkah standards, and religious and spiritual classics".

- Tucson Boys Choir Conducted by Eduardo Caso – LB 758 (1946)
- The Tucson Arizona Boys Chorus (194-?)
- Melody at Sunset (1957)
- Campfire Songs (1959)
- Choirboy Christmas at Mission San Xavier (1966)
- Howlin'! (1970)
- Tucson…Arizona's Favorite Child (1978)
- Christmas Favorites (1980)
- Sings America (1991)
- Holiday Treasures (1994)
- Heaven Hath a Song (1997)
- Welcome Sabbath (Vol. 1) (1999)
- Songs of the Saddle...and South Africa (2004)
- "We're Versatile"! (n.d.)
- Arizona for the Holidays (n.d.)

Under Caso's direction, the chorus produced a 45 rpm phonograph record, Blue Shadows on the Trail / Thumbelina.

== Awards and honors ==
Caso and the Tucson Arizona Boys Chorus received a National Certificate of Award of Merit from the National Federation of Music Clubs in 1962. In 1966 the chorus received the Governor's Arts Award for Arts in Education. The chorus was honored as Grand Marshal of the Tucson Rodeo Parade in 2012.

== See also ==
- Tucson Girls Chorus

== Sources ==
- Sonnichsen, C. L. (1987). Tucson: The Life and Times of an American City (Revised ed.). University of Oklahoma Press. ISBN 9780806120423.
- Votto, Mary Paganelli (2012). Insiders' Guide® to Tucson (7th ed.). Rowman & Littlefield. ISBN 9780762775828.
