= Agua Caliente Casino =

Agua Caliente Casino may refer to:

== United States ==
- Agua Caliente Casino Resort Spa, in Rancho Mirage, California
- Agua Caliente Casino in downtown Palm Springs, California, operated by the Agua Caliente Band of Cahuilla Indians

== Mexico ==
- Agua Caliente Casino and Hotel, in Tijuana
