= Agua Caliente Regional Park =

Regional park in Pima County, Arizona

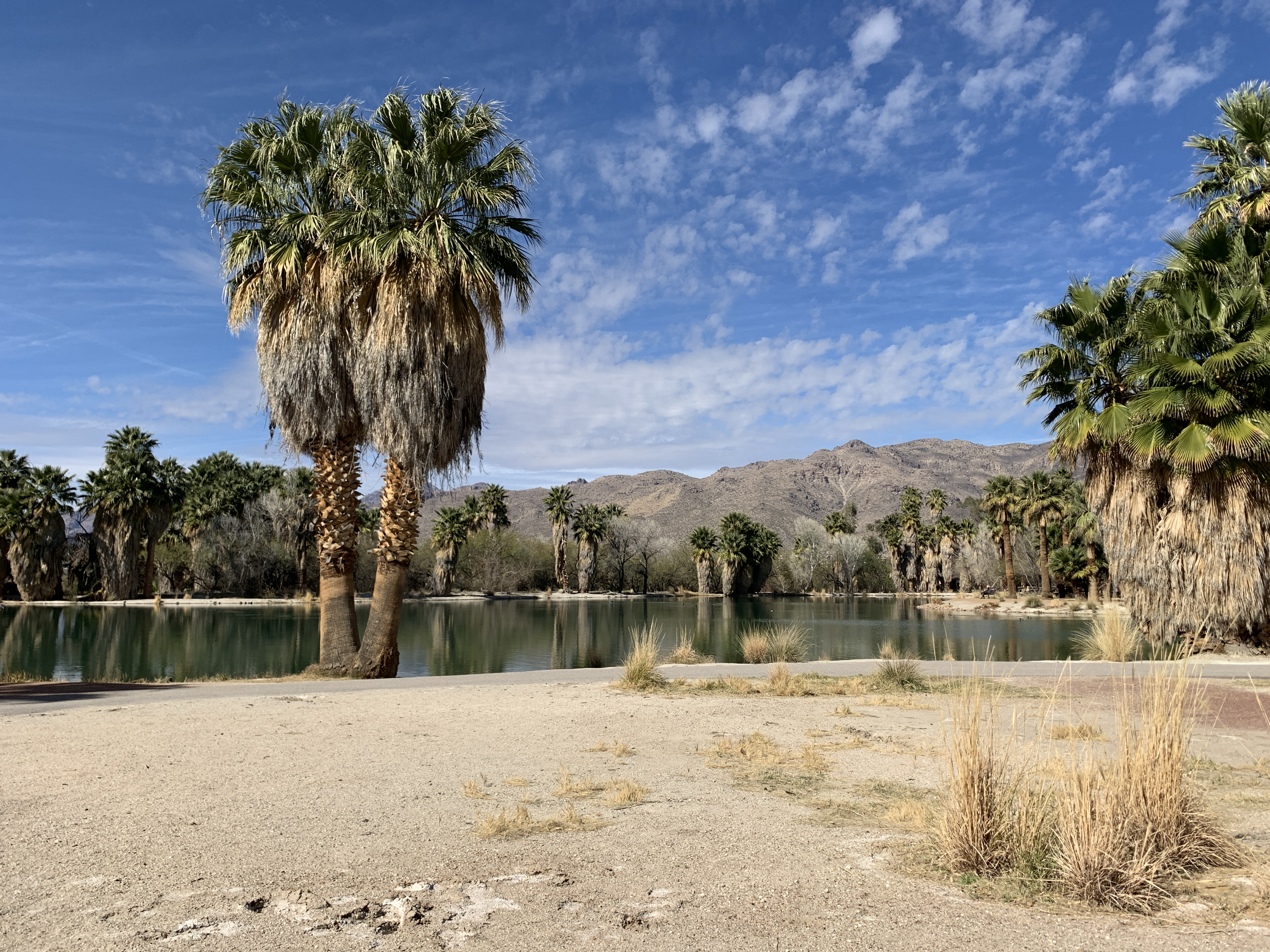
- Interactive map of Agua Caliente Regional Park
- Type: regional park
- Location: Tucson, Arizona
- Coordinates: 32°16′54″N 110°43′57″W
- Area: 101 acres (41 ha)
- Created: 1985
- Operator: Pima County Natural Resources, Parks and Recreation
- Open: 7:00 AM - Sunset
- Status: open all year

Roy P. Drachman-Agua Caliente Regional Park is a 101 acres (41 ha) regional park in northeastern Tucson, Arizona.

== History ==
In 1984 Roy P. Drachman donated over $200,000 to Pima County towards the purchase of the property.
