= Tucson Desert Harmony Chorus =

Musical group in Pima County, Arizona

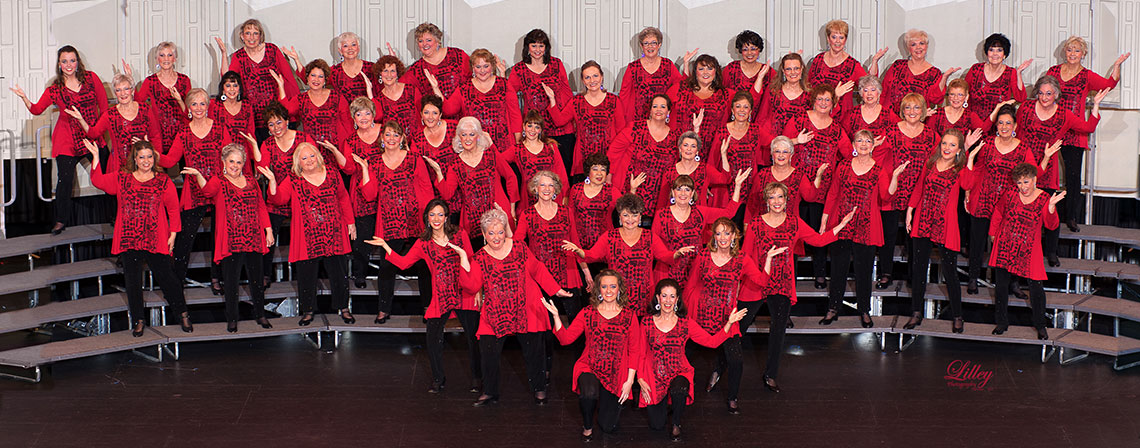
- Tucson Desert Harmony Chorus at the 2016 Regional Competition.

Background information
- Origin: Tucson, Arizona, United States of America
- Genres: a cappella
- Years active: 1986–present
- Website: tucsondesertharmony.com

The Tucson Desert Harmony Chorus is an all-female, a cappella chorus based in Tucson, Arizona.

== History ==
Founded in 1986 as the Tucson Goodtime Singers, the Tucson Desert Harmony Chorus Chorus is an a cappella chorus in Golden West Region 21. Singing music primarily in the barbershop style, they are affiliated with Sweet Adelines International (SAI), the world's largest all-female singing organization with over 25,000 members worldwide.

== Contest Placement ==
- Harmony Classic 2nd place: 2014 International Baltimore, MD

== Directors ==
The Tucson Desert Harmony Chorus is co-directed by Dayle Ann Kerrigan and Karen Jo Meade.
