= Aguas Calientes River (Sucre) =

River in Venezuela

Coordinates: 10.6361°N 62.4467°W

Aguas Calientes ("hot waters" in Spanish) is the name of a small river in Benítez Municipality, Sucre state, Venezuela. It is fed by hot springs of which there are a number on the Paria Peninsula.

The waters of the river are hot enough for cooking purposes, but not as hot as those of Las Trincheras, the source of the similarly named river in Carabobo state.
