= Rillito River Park =

City park in Tucson, Arizona, US

Coordinates: 32.2741°N 110.9038°W

- Interactive map of Rillito River Park
- Type: Linear park
- Location: Tucson, Arizona, United States
- Operator: Pima County Parks and Recreation

Rillito River Park is a 12-mile-long linear park in Tucson, Arizona, that runs along the north and south banks of the Rillito River from Interstate 10 to North Craycroft Road.

The park is part of The Loop, a network of linear parks serving Tucson and its suburbs. At its west end, the Rillito trail passes under Interstate 10 (Arizona) before connecting into the Santa Cruz River Park. East of Craycroft, the Rillito forks into the Tanque Verde Wash and the Pantano River. While dedicated trails are developed, on-street connections link the Rillito trail with the Pantano River Park trails where they start at Tanque Verde Road. Pantano River Park connects via the Harrison Greenway with the Julian Wash Greenway, which runs northwest to where it rejoins the Santa Cruz River Park. Rillito River Park has amenities including drinking water, equestrian access, exercise stations, restrooms, river parks, and walking paths.
