= Aguas Calientes, Jujuy =

Coordinates: 24°35′00″S 64°55′30″W

Aguas Calientes (Jujuy)
- Municipality and town
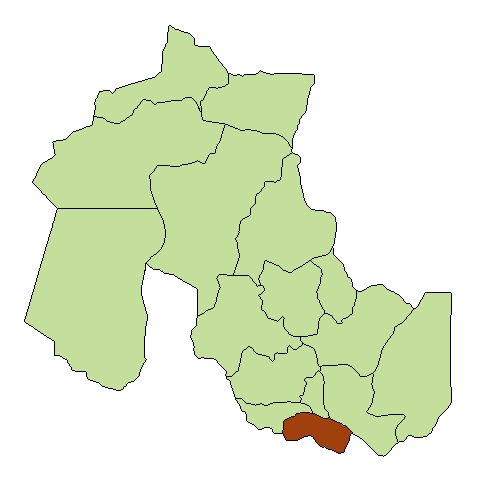
- Country: Argentina
- Province: Jujuy Province

Population (2001)
  - Total: 3,436
- Time zone: UTC−3 (ART)
- Postal code: Y4431
- Area code: 0388

Aguas Calientes (Jujuy) is a town and municipality in Jujuy Province in Argentina.

== Geography ==
Aguas Calientes is located at 567 meters above sea level and 60 km south of San Salvador de Jujuy.

== Climate ==
Climate data for Aguas Calientes (1965–1989)
Month	Jan	Feb	Mar	Apr	May	Jun	Jul	Aug	Sep	Oct	Nov	Dec	Year
Daily mean °C (°F)	25.0 (77.0)	24.1 (75.4)	22.5 (72.5)	19.4 (66.9)	16.5 (61.7)	13.3 (55.9)	13.2 (55.8)	15.1 (59.2)	18.0 (64.4)	21.5 (70.7)	23.4 (74.1)	24.8 (76.6)	19.7 (67.5)
Average precipitation mm (inches)	138 (5.4)	119 (4.7)	120 (4.7)	53 (2.1)	13 (0.5)	6 (0.2)	3 (0.1)	2 (0.1)	6 (0.2)	13 (0.5)	65 (2.6)	76 (3.0)	614 (24.2)
Source: Instituto Nacional de Tecnología Agropecuaria

== Geology ==
Aguas Calientes (Jujuy) has a sedimentary Paleozoic "base", appearing through tecto-erosive vents. They form the core of the mountains, intermittently overlying a Meso-Cenozoic sedimentary cover. This sedimentary complex evolved in successive cycles, mostly marine. "Yacoraite formation" minerals are made up of dolomitic, travertine and argonite limestones.
