= Pima County Natural Resources, Parks and Recreation =

Government agency in Arizona

Pima County Parks and Recreation
Agency overview
- Formed: 1947
- Headquarters: 3500 W. River Road Tucson, AZ 85741 (520) 877-6000
- Agency executive: Victor M. Pereira, Director
- Parent agency: Pima County
- Website: https://www.pima.gov/1193/Parks-Recreation

Pima County Parks and Recreation is the agency within Pima County, Arizona that manages the parks, and recreation offerings within Pima County including Tucson, AZ.

== History ==
The agency was established by the county as the Parks and Recreation Department in 1947 with the intended goal of serving "urban and rural residents and guests by providing leisure-time destinations and services."

== Parks ==
NRPR manages 51 parks with the majority located in or near Tucson. Ajo's parks include Ajo Regional Park, E.S. Bud Walker Park, Forrest Rickard Park, and Palo Verde II Park. Green Valley's parks include Canoa Preserve Park and Canoa Ranch.

=== Tucson Region ===
Northwest
- Arthur Pack Regional Park
- Cañada del Oro River Park
- Casas Adobes Park
- Children's Memorial Park
- Curtis Park
- Dan Felix Memorial Park
- Denny Dunn Park
- Feliz Paseos Park
- Flowing Wells Park
- Linda Vista Park
- Meadowbrook Park
- Mike Jacob Sports Park
- Northwest Community Park
- Picture Rocks Park
- Pima Prickly Park
- Richardson Park
- Rillito Vista Park
- Sunset Pointe Park
- Sweetwater Preserve
- Tortolita Mountain Park
- Tucson Mountain Park
- Wildwood Neighborhood Park

Northeast
- Agua Caliente Park
- Brandi Fenton Memorial Park
- Catalina Neighborhood Park
- Catalina Regional Park
- George Mehl Family Foothills Park
- McDonald Park
- Pantano River Park
- Rillito Regional Park

Southeast
- Augie Acuna Los Ninos Park
- Cienega Creek Natural Preserve
- Southeast Regional Park
- Summit Old Nogales Park
- Thomas Jay Regional Park

Southwest
- Branding Iron Park
- Ebonee Marie Moody Park
- El Paseo de los Arboles Commemorative Park
- Lawrence Park
- Mission Ridge Park
- Robles Pass
- Star Valley Park
- Three Points Veterans Memorial Park
- Vesey Park
- Winston Reynolds – Manzanita Park

== River Parks and Greenways ==
- The Loop (metro river park system)
- Cañada del Oro River Park
- Harrison Greenway
- Julian Wash Greenway
- Pantano River Park
- Rillito River Park
- Santa Cruz River Park

== Trailheads ==
- 36th Street Trailhead
- Abrego Trailhead
- Agua Caliente Hill South Trailhead
- Avenida de Suzenu Trailhead
- Bear Canyon Trailhead
- Camino de Oeste Trailhead
- Campbell TrailheadCentral Arizona Project Trailhead
- Colossal Cave Road Trailhead
- David Yetman West Trailhead
- El Camino del Cerro Trailhead
- Explorer Trailhead
- Gabe Zimmerman Davidson Canyon Trailhead
- Gates Pass Trailhead
- Iris Dewhirst Pima Canyon Trailhead
- King Canyon Trailhead
- Richard Genser Starr Pass Trailhead
- Richard McKee Finger Rock Trailhead
- Sarasota Trailhead
- Sweetwater Preserve Trailhead
- Ventana Canyon Trailhead

== Community Centers ==
The NRPR has 13 community centers:

- Ajo Community Center
- Arivaca Community Center
- Catalina Community Center
- Centro Del Sur Community Center and Boxing Gym
- Continental Community Center
- Drexel Heights Community Center
- Ellie Towne Flowing Wells Community Center
- John A. Valenzuela Youth Center
- Littletown Community Center
- Mt. Lemmon Community Center
- Northwest YMCA Pima County Community Center
- Picture Rocks Community Center
- Robles Ranch Community Center

== Pools and Splash Pads ==
The NRPR has 10 pools and 2 splash pads community centers:

- Ajo Pool
- Brandi Fenton Splash Pad
- Catalina Pool
- Flowing Wells Pool
- Kino Pool (Mulcahy YMCA)
- Los Niños Pool (Augie Acuña)
- Manzanita Pool Park
- Picture Rocks Pool and Splash Pad
- Thad Terry Pool (Northwest YMCA)
- Wade McLean Pool (Marana High School Pool)

== Shooting and Archery Ranges ==
- Southeast Archery Range
- Southeast Clay Target Center
- Southeast Regional Park Shooting Range
- Tucson Mountain Park Archery Range
- Tucson Mountain Park Rifle and Pistol Range
- Virgil Ellis Shooting Range (located at Ajo Regional Park)
