= Agua Caliente Airport =

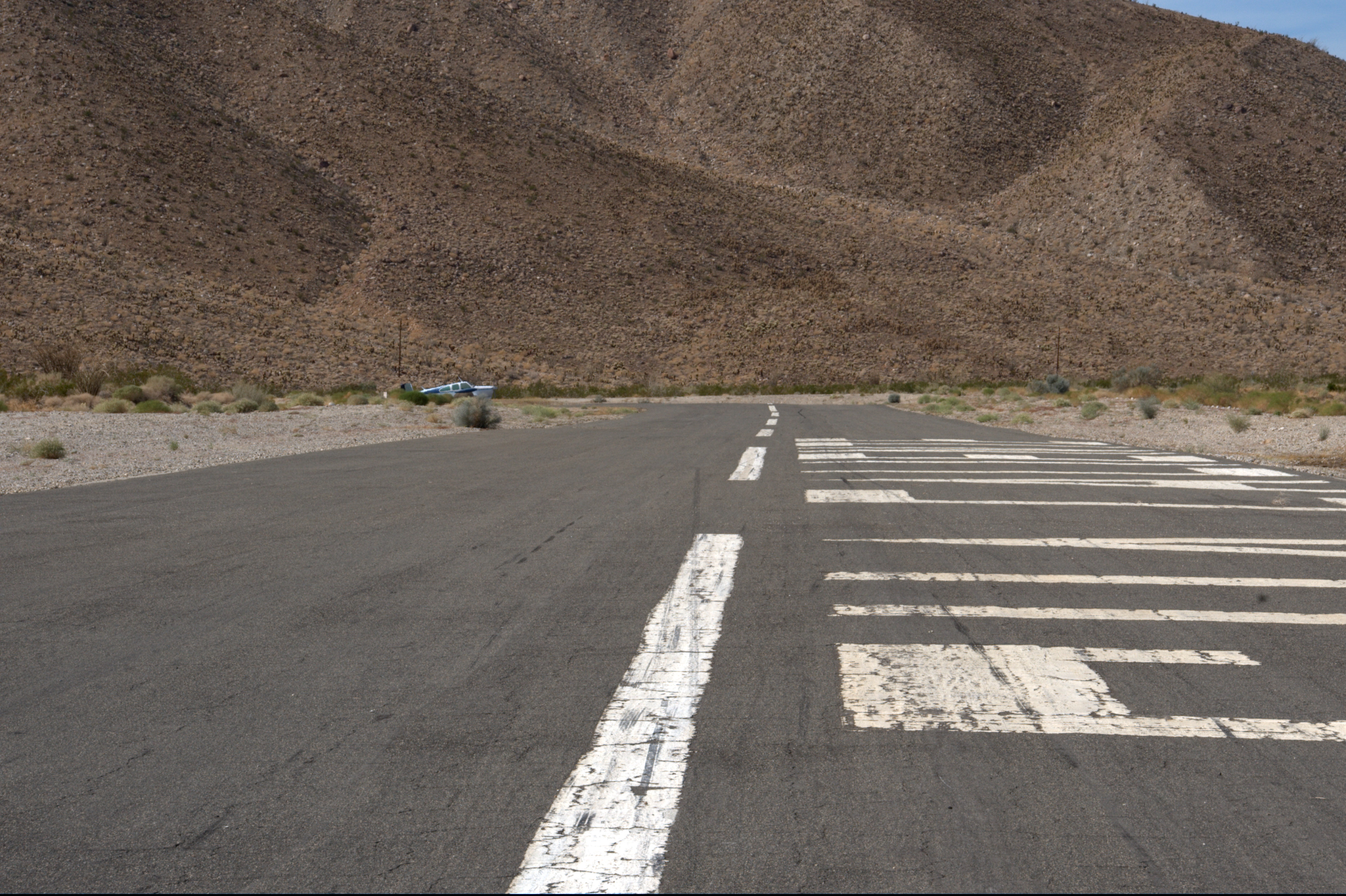
- IATA: none; ICAO: none; FAA LID: L54

Summary
- Airport type: Public
- Owner/Operator: State of California Parks
- Serves: Agua Caliente County Park; San Diego County, California
- Location: San Diego County Route S2
- Elevation AMSL: 1,220 ft (370 m)
- Coordinates: 32°57′22″N 116°17′44″W
- Website: co.san-diego.ca.us/...
- Interactive map of Agua Caliente Airport

Runways
Direction	Length		Surface
Direction	ft	m	Surface
Formerly 11/29	Formerly 2,500	Formerly 762	Asphalt
- Source: Federal Aviation Administration

Agua Caliente Airport (FAA LID: L54) (Agua Caliente Airstrip) was a public airport one mile northeast of Agua Caliente County Park in San Diego County, California. This airport has now closed. It covered 160 acres (65 ha) and had one runway. Agua Caliente translates to "Hot Water" from Spanish.

As of May 2014, no aircraft were based at the airport. L54 had no food, fuel or services and limited aircraft parking but no tiedown fees. It was usually a destination for those flying in to visit the geothermally heated Agua Caliente Hot Springs or hike and camp in Anza-Borrego Desert State Park.

For the 12-month period ending December 31, 2020, the airport had 4400 general aviation aircraft operations, an average of 367 per month or 12 per day, typically transient aircraft.
