= Fallbrook Community Airpark =

- IATA: none; ICAO: none; FAA LID: L18

Summary
- Airport type: Public
- Owner: County of San Diego
- Serves: Fallbrook, California
- Elevation AMSL: 708 ft (216 m)
- Coordinates: 33°21′15″N 117°15′03″W
- Interactive map of Fallbrook Community Airpark

Runways
| Direction | Length | | Surface |
| Direction | ft | m | Surface |
|---|---|---|---|
| 18/36 | 2,160 | 658 | Asphalt |

Statistics (2020)
- Aircraft operations: 36,125
- Based aircraft: 97
- Source: Federal Aviation Administration

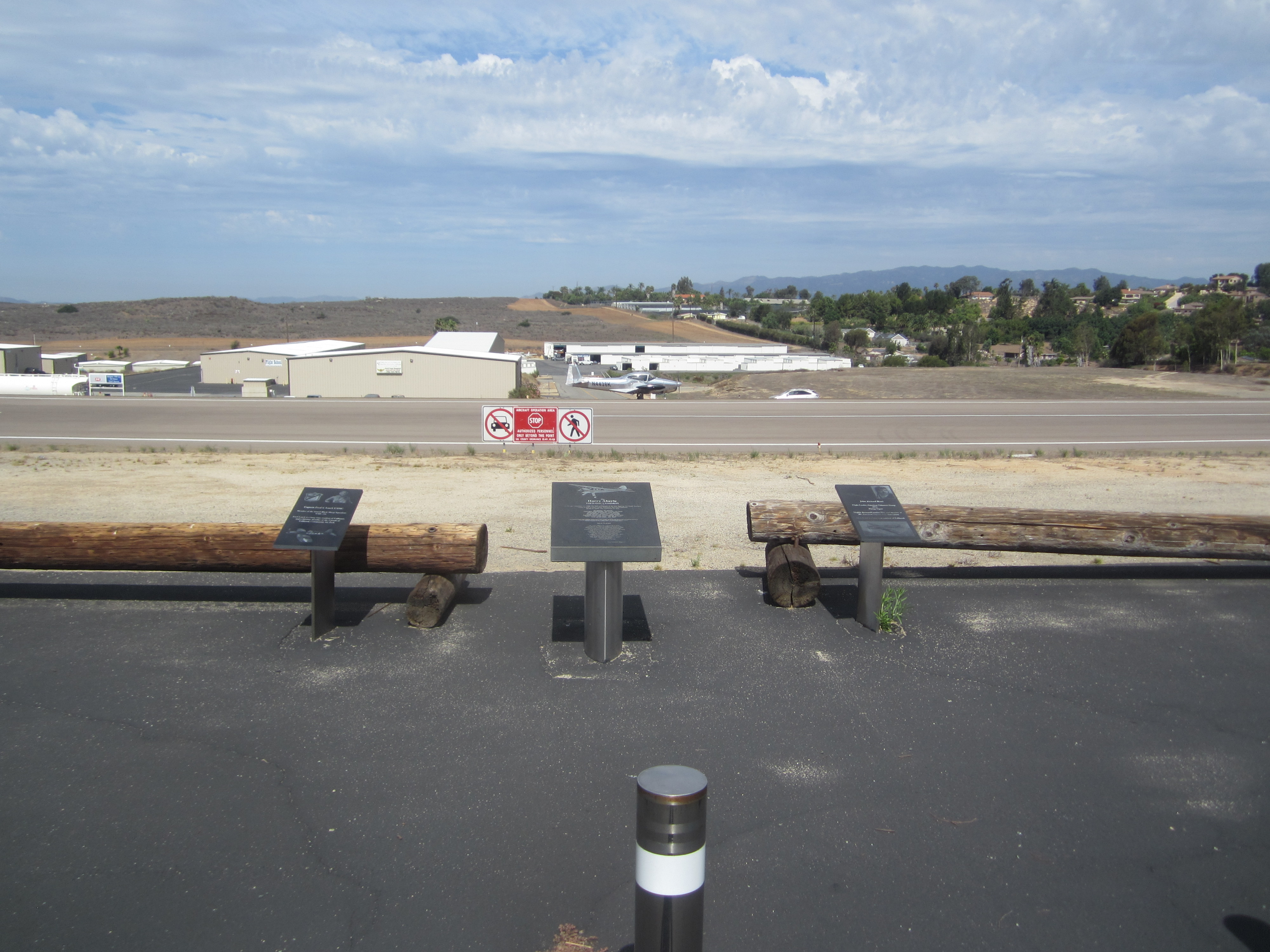
View across runway/taxiway at Fallbrook Community Airpark

Fallbrook Community Airpark (FAA LID: L18), also known as Fallbrook Airpark, is a county-owned public-use airport two nautical miles (3.7 km) south of the central business district of Fallbrook, in San Diego County, California, United States.

== History ==
Fallbrook Community Airpark was planned, built and financed by individual volunteer efforts by members of the community. In April 1963 the San Diego Board of Supervisors accepted a deed for the airport land from the U.S. Navy. In October 1963 the Supervisors granted a special use permit about ten months after the State of California had granted the airport permit. In September 1964 construction on the airport was started by the Fallbrook Community Airpark Board. The airfield consisted of a 2,200 foot dirt landing strip and the first operations occurred on October 28, 1964. In 1967, the first 10 metal T-hangars were constructed, and in 1968 a fixed-base operator opened a flying service with pilot instruction, aircraft rental, fuel and other services. The airport was originally operated for the county by a nonprofit citizens' group called the Fallbrook Community Air Park. The county resumed management and operation of the airport in November 1997.

== Facilities and aircraft ==
Fallbrook Community Airpark covers an area of 290 acres (120 ha) at an elevation of 708 feet (216 m) above mean sea level. It has one runway designated 18/36 with an asphalt surface measuring 2,160 by 60 feet (658 x 18 m). The airport also has one heliport, designated H1, measuring 45 x 45 ft (14 x 14 m).

For the 12-month period ending December 31, 2020, the airport had 21,000 general aviation aircraft operations, an average of 68 per day. At that time there were 98 aircraft based at this airport: 93 single-engine, 4 multi-engine airplanes and 1 glider.

== Accidents & Incidents ==
- On July 23, 2022, a North American T-28 Trojan crashed at Fallbrook. One occupant received fatal injuries, and another was seriously injured. The crash is under investigation.
