= Agua Caliente County Park =

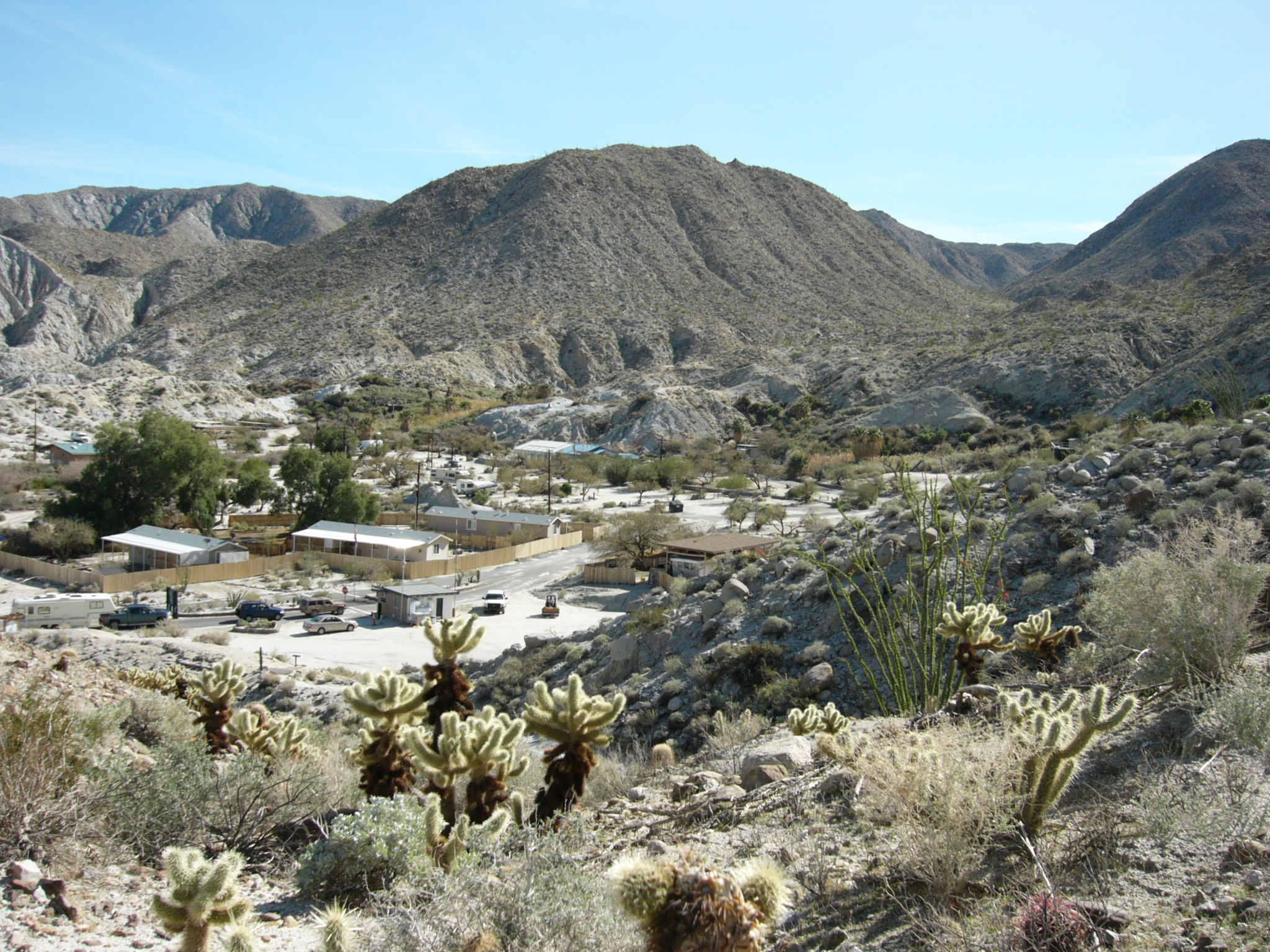
- Agua Caliente County Park, San Diego County, California

- Location within San Diego County, California Location within California
- Coordinates: 32.950°N 116.303°W
- Area: 910 acres (370 ha; 1.42 sq mi)
- Elevation: 1,350 feet (410 m)
- Operator: San Diego County
- Open: Labor Day weekend to last weekend of May; Day use 9:30 am to 5:00 pm
- Camp sites: 140; Full and partial RV hookups, tent camping, and cabins
- Hiking trails: 3.95 miles (6.36 km) no dogs, no OHV, no bicycles on trails
- Website: Agua Caliente County Park

Agua Caliente County Park is a 910 acres (370 ha; 1.42 sq mi) park with geothermally heated springs. The park is located just west of Anza-Borrego Desert State Park, in eastern San Diego County, California. Agua Caliente is located about 110 miles (180 km) east of downtown San Diego. Spring water feed pools include an outdoor swimming pool, an outdoor wading pool for children, and an indoor 102 °F (39 °C) therapeutic spa. Site amenities include a caravan area, full and partial hookup RV sites, non-hookup sites, tent camping, and cabins. Facilities include shuffle board, horseshoes, day use picnic area, and dressing rooms. 3.95 miles (6.36 km) hiking trails from flat terrain to steep rocky trails.

== Season and hours ==
The park is open from the Friday of Labor Day weekend until Memorial Day. The park is closed during the hot summer months. Camping is open 24 hours and campsites can be reserved as far as a year in advance. Day use from 9:30 am to 5:00 pm. Pool hours are from 9:30 am – 5:00 pm with later hours on weekends for campers and early mornings (9:30am–10:30am) reserved for adults.

== Destinations nearby ==
=== North ===
- Banner, California, about 27 miles (43 km) 40 minutes
- Julian, California, about 44 miles (71 km) 1 hour
- Anza-Borrego Desert State Park about 43 miles (69 km) 1 hour

=== South ===
- El Centro, California, about 54 miles (87 km) 1 hour
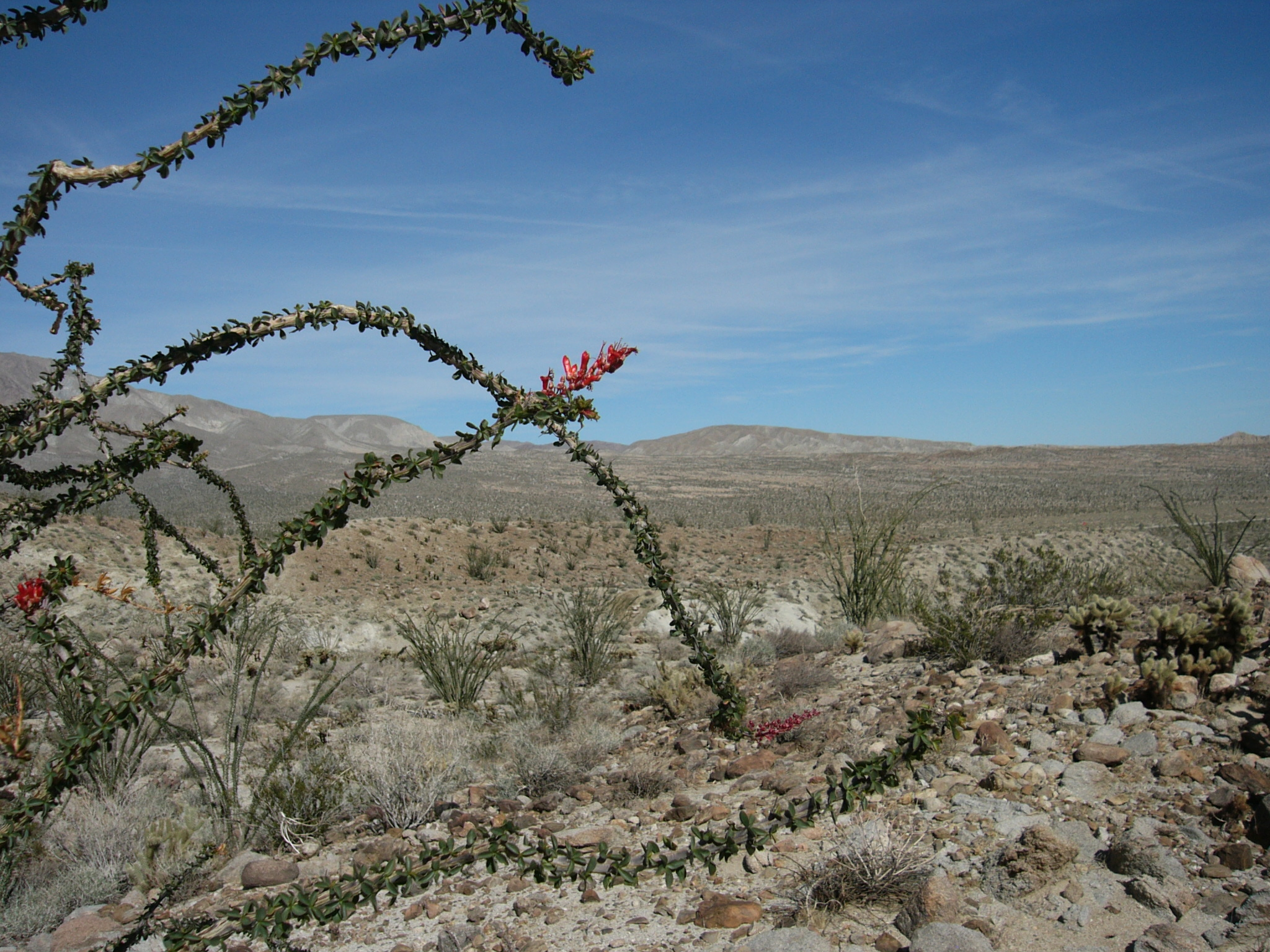
Eastern view with blooming ocotillo

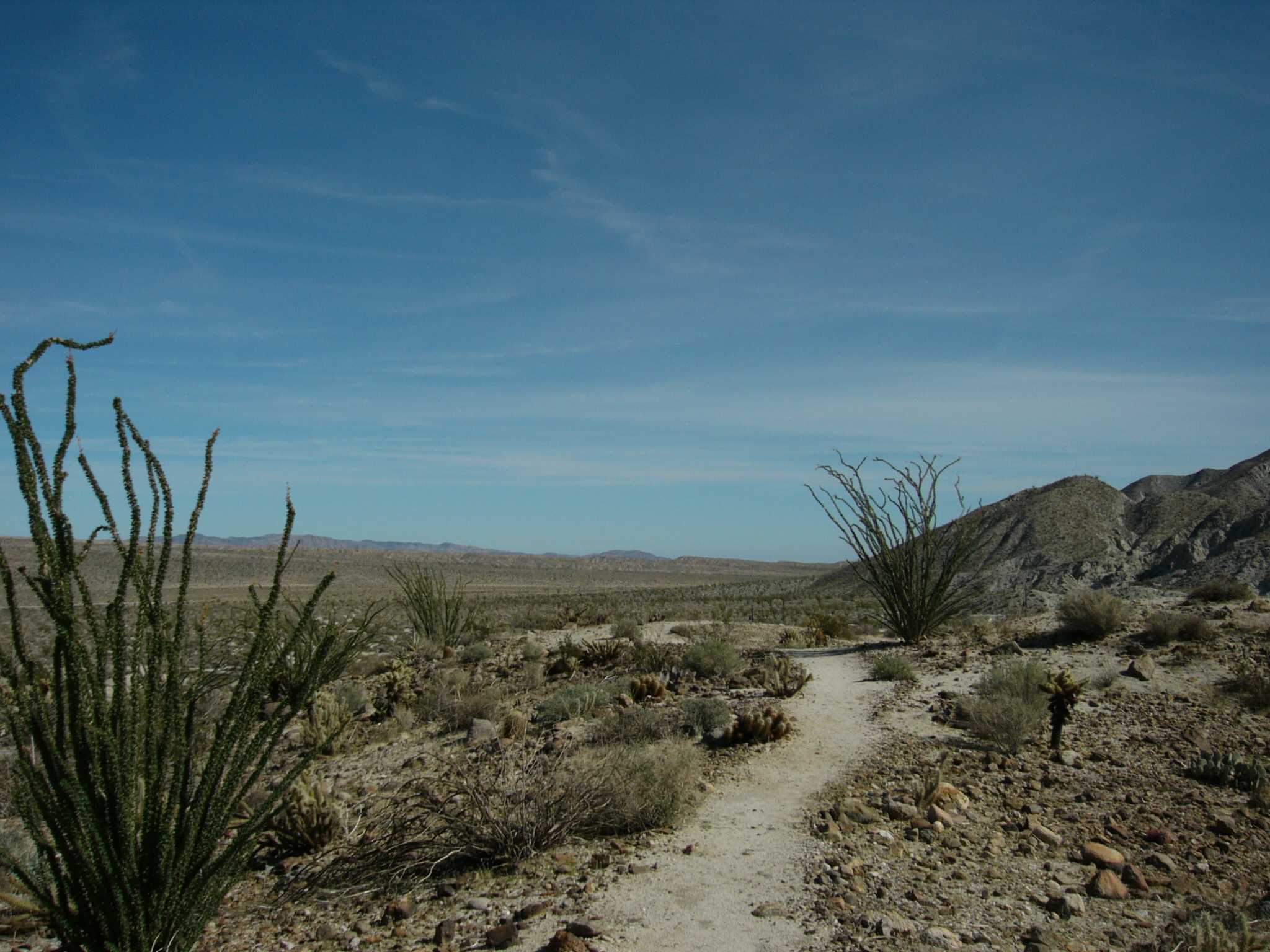
Moonlight trail eastern trail head

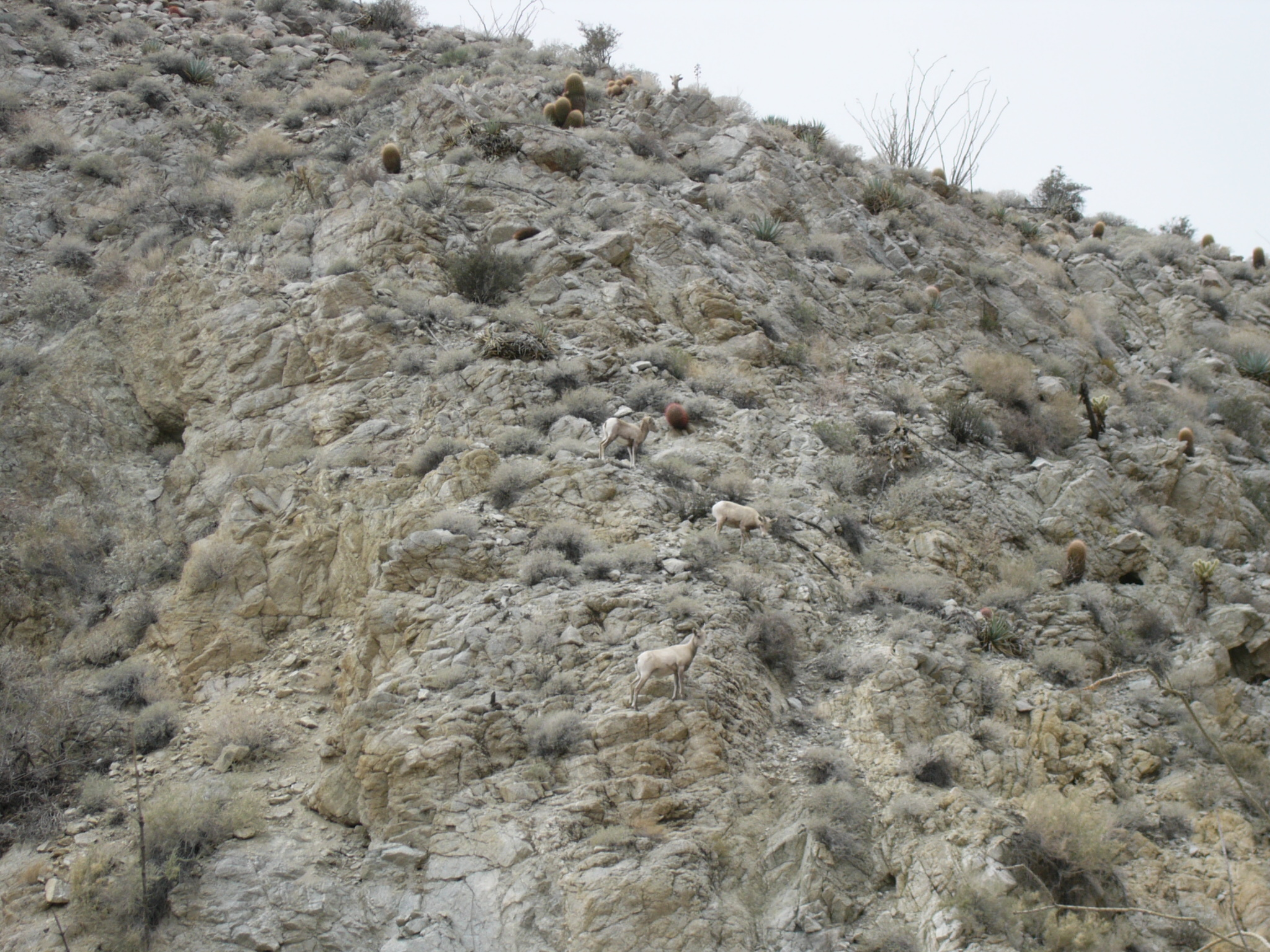
Four Bighorn sheep on Marsh Trail.

== See also ==
- Agua Caliente Airport
