= List of airports in California =

This is a list of airports in California (a U.S. state), grouped by type and sorted by location. It contains all public-use and military airports in the state. Some private-use and former airports may be included where notable, such as airports that were previously public-use, those with commercial enplanements recorded by the FAA or airports assigned an IATA airport code.

== Airports ==
This list contains the following information:

- **City served** – The city generally associated with the airport, as per the airport's master record with the Federal Aviation Administration. This is not always the actual location since some airports are located in smaller towns outside of the city they serve. It is not meant to be a complete list of cities served, which can be found in or added to each airport's Wikipedia article.
- **FAA** – The location identifier assigned by the Federal Aviation Administration (FAA). These are linked to each airport's page at the AirportIQ 5010 website (FAA contractor for the Master Record/Form 5010 database).
- **IATA** – The airport code assigned by the International Air Transport Association (IATA). Those that do not match the FAA code are shown in bold.
- **ICAO** – The location indicator assigned by the International Civil Aviation Organization (ICAO).
- **Airport name** – The official airport name. Those shown in **bold** indicate the airport has scheduled passenger service on commercial airlines.
- **Role** – One of four FAA airport categories, as per the 2023–2027 National Plan of Integrated Airport Systems (NPIAS) report released September 2022:
  - P-s: Commercial service – primary are publicly owned airports that receive scheduled passenger service and have more than 10,000 passenger boardings (enplanements) each year. Each primary airport is sub-classified by the FAA as one of the following four "hub" types (s):
    - L: Large hub that accounts for at least 1% of total U.S. passenger enplanements.
    - M: Medium hub that accounts for between 0.25% and 1% of total U.S. passenger enplanements.
    - S: Small hub that accounts for between 0.05% and 0.25% of total U.S. passenger enplanements.
    - N: Nonhub that accounts for less than 0.05% of total U.S. passenger enplanements, but more than 10,000 annual enplanements.
  - CS: Commercial service – nonprimary are publicly owned airports that receive scheduled passenger service and have at least 2,500 passenger boardings each year.
  - R: Reliever airports are designated by the FAA to relieve congestion at a large commercial service airport and to provide more general aviation access to the overall community.
  - GA: General aviation airports are the largest single group of airports in the U.S. airport system. They are public-use airports that do not have scheduled service or have scheduled service with less than 2,500 passenger boardings each year.
- **Enplanements** – The number of enplanements (commercial passenger boardings) that occurred at the airport in calendar year 2024, as per FAA records released 2025.

City served	FAA	IATA	ICAO	Airport name	Role	Enplanements (2024)
				**Commercial service – primary airports**		
Arcata/Eureka	ACV	ACV	KACV	**California Redwood Coast–Humboldt County Airport**	P-N	133,682
Bakersfield	BFL	BFL	KBFL	**Meadows Field**	P-N	195,148
Burbank	BUR	BUR	KBUR	**Hollywood Burbank Airport**	P-M	3,383,237
Fresno	FAT	FAT	KFAT	**Fresno Yosemite International Airport**	P-S	1,318,250
Long Beach	LGB	LGB	KLGB	**Long Beach Airport** (Daugherty Field)	P-S	2,031,810
Los Angeles	LAX	LAX	KLAX	**Los Angeles International Airport**	P-L	37,760,834
Monterey	MRY	MRY	KMRY	**Monterey Regional Airport**	P-N	305,434
Oakland	OAK	OAK	KOAK	**Oakland San Francisco Bay Airport**	P-M	5,292,736
Ontario	ONT	ONT	KONT	**Ontario International Airport**	P-M	3,494,554
Palm Springs	PSP	PSP	KPSP	**Palm Springs International Airport**	P-S	1,617,586
Redding	RDD	RDD	KRDD	**Redding Regional Airport**	P-N	88,676
Sacramento	SMF	SMF	KSMF	**Sacramento International Airport**	P-M	6,679,426
San Diego	SAN	SAN	KSAN	**San Diego International Airport**	P-L	12,780,013
San Francisco	SFO	SFO	KSFO	**San Francisco International Airport**	P-L	25,078,968
San Jose	SJC	SJC	KSJC	**San Jose International Airport**	P-M	5,822,019
San Luis Obispo	SBP	SBP	KSBP	**San Luis Obispo County Regional Airport** (McChesney Field)	P-N	366,428
Santa Ana	SNA	SNA	KSNA	**John Wayne Airport**	P-M	5,370,273
Santa Barbara	SBA	SBA	KSBA	**Santa Barbara Municipal Airport** (Santa Barbara Airport)	P-S	696,396
Santa Maria	SMX	SMX	KSMX	**Santa Maria Public Airport** (Capt G. Allan Hancock Field)	P-N	13,525
Santa Rosa	STS	STS	KSTS	**Charles M. Schulz–Sonoma County Airport**	P-N	382,556
Stockton	SCK	SCK	KSCK	**Stockton Metropolitan Airport**	P-N	63,668
				**Commercial service – nonprimary airports**		
Crescent City	CEC	CEC	KCEC	**Del Norte County Airport** (Jack McNamara Field)	CS	8,027
Hawthorne	HHR	HHR	KHHR	**Hawthorne Municipal Airport** (Jack Northrop Field)	CS	6,417
Imperial / El Centro	IPL	IPL	KIPL	**Imperial County Airport** (Boley Field)	CS	4,183
Merced	MCE	MCE	KMCE	**Merced Regional Airport** (MacReady Field)	CS	4,858
San Bernardino	SBD	SBD	KSBD	**San Bernardino International Airport**	P-N	20,147
San Carlos	SQL	SQL	KSQL	**San Carlos Airport**	CS	1,889
				**Reliever airports**		
Byron	C83			Byron Airport	R	0
Camarillo	CMA		KCMA	Camarillo Airport	R	44
Chino	CNO	CNO	KCNO	Chino Airport	R	15
Compton	CPM	CPM	KCPM	Compton/Woodley Airport	R	0
El Monte	EMT	EMT	KEMT	San Gabriel Valley Airport	R	11
Fresno	FCH	FCH	KFCH	Fresno Chandler Executive Airport	R	0
Fullerton	FUL	FUL	KFUL	Fullerton Municipal Airport	R	5
Half Moon Bay	HAF	HAF	KHAF	Half Moon Bay Airport	R	5
Hayward	HWD	HWD	KHWD	Hayward Executive Airport	R	30
La Verne	POC	POC	KPOC	Brackett Field	R	0
Lincoln	LHM		KLHM	Lincoln Regional Airport (Karl Harder Field)	R	4
Livermore	LVK	LVK	KLVK	Livermore Municipal Airport	R	37
Los Angeles	WHP	WHP	KWHP	Whiteman Airport	R	0
Moreno Valley	RIV	RIV	KRIV	March Air Reserve Base	R	28,711
Napa	APC	APC	KAPC	**Napa County Airport**	R	445
Novato	DVO	NOT	KDVO	Gnoss Field (Marin County Airport)	R	102
Palo Alto	PAO	PAO	KPAO	Palo Alto Airport of Santa Clara County	R	52
Petaluma	O69			Petaluma Municipal Airport	R	1
Ramona	RNM		KRNM	Ramona Airport	R	2
Riverside	RAL	RAL	KRAL	Riverside Municipal Airport	R	0
Sacramento	SAC	SAC	KSAC	Sacramento Executive Airport	R	26
Sacramento	MHR	MHR	KMHR	Sacramento Mather Airport	R	269
San Diego	SDM	SDM	KSDM	Brown Field Municipal Airport	R	99
San Diego	MYF	MYF	KMYF	Montgomery-Gibbs Executive Airport	R	77
San Diego / El Cajon	SEE	SEE	KSEE	Gillespie Field	R	88
San Jose	RHV	RHV	KRHV	Reid-Hillview Airport of Santa Clara County	R	0
San Martin	E16			San Martin Airport	R	8
Santa Monica	SMO	SMO	KSMO	Santa Monica Municipal Airport	R	223
Torrance	TOA	TOA	KTOA	Zamperini Field	R	20
Upland	CCB	CCB	KCCB	Cable Airport	R	15
Van Nuys	VNY	VNY	KVNY	Van Nuys Airport	R	2,477
Victorville	VCV	VCV	KVCV	Southern California Logistics Airport	R	3,639
				**General aviation airports**		
Alturas	AAT		KAAT	Alturas Municipal Airport	GA	0
Apple Valley	APV	APV	KAPV	Apple Valley Airport	GA	0
Atwater / Merced	MER	MER	KMER	Castle Airport	GA	0
Auburn	AUN	AUN	KAUN	Auburn Municipal Airport	GA	5
Bakersfield	L45			Bakersfield Municipal Airport	GA	0
Banning	BNG	BNG	KBNG	Banning Municipal Airport	GA	0
Beckwourth	O02			Nervino Airport	GA	0
Big Bear City	L35	**RBF**		Big Bear City Airport	GA	4
Bishop	BIH	BIH	KBIH	**Eastern Sierra Regional Airport**	GA	10,119
Blythe	BLH	BLH	KBLH	Blythe Airport	GA	0
Boonville	D83			Boonville Airport	GA	0
Borrego Springs	L08	**BXS**		Borrego Valley Airport	GA	0
Brawley	BWC	BWC	KBWC	Brawley Municipal Airport	GA	0
Bridgeport	O57			Bryant Field	GA	0
Calexico	CXL	CXL	KCXL	Calexico International Airport	GA	44
California City	L71			California City Municipal Airport	GA	0
Cameron Park	O61			Cameron Airpark	GA	0
Carlsbad	CRQ	**CLD**	KCRQ	**McClellan–Palomar Airport**	GA	17,434
Cedarville	O59			Cedarville Airport	GA	0
Chemehuevi Valley	49X			Chemehuevi Valley Airport	GA	0
Chester	O05			Rogers Field	GA	0
Chico	CIC	CIC	KCIC	Chico Municipal Airport	GA	6
Chowchilla	2O6			Chowchilla Airport	GA	0
Cloverdale	O60			Cloverdale Municipal Airport	GA	0
Coalinga	C80	**CLG**		New Coalinga Municipal Airport	GA	0
Columbia	O22	**COA**		Columbia Airport	GA	18
Colusa	O08			Colusa County Airport	GA	0
Concord	CCR	CCR	KCCR	**Buchanan Field Airport**	GA	13,226
Corning	0O4			Corning Municipal Airport	GA	0
Corona	AJO		KAJO	Corona Municipal Airport	GA	0
Covelo	O09			Round Valley Airport	GA	0
Daggett	DAG	DAG	KDAG	Barstow-Daggett Airport	GA	13
Davis	EDU		KEDU	University Airport	GA	2
Davis / Woodland / Winters	DWA		KDWA	Yolo County Airport	GA	2
Delano	DLO		KDLO	Delano Municipal Airport	GA	0
Dinsmore	D63			Dinsmore Airport	GA	0
Dorris	A32			Butte Valley Airport	GA	0
Dunsmuir	1O6			Dunsmuir Municipal-Mott Airport	GA	0
Eureka	O19			Kneeland Airport	GA	0
Eureka	EKA	EKA	KEKA	Murray Field	GA	0
Fall River Mills	O89			Fall River Mills Airport	GA	1
Fallbrook	L18			Fallbrook Community Airpark	GA	0
Firebaugh	F34			Firebaugh Airport	GA	0
Fort Jones	A30			Scott Valley Airport	GA	4
Fortuna	FOT		KFOT	Rohnerville Airport	GA	0
Franklin	F72			Franklin Field	GA	0
Garberville	O16			Garberville Airport	GA	0
Georgetown	E36			Georgetown Airport	GA	0
Grass Valley	GOO	GOO	KGOO	Nevada County Air Park (Nevada County Airport)	GA	58
Groveland	E45			Pine Mountain Lake Airport	GA	11
Gustine	3O1			Gustine Airport	GA	0
Hanford	HJO		KHJO	Hanford Municipal Airport	GA	12
Happy Camp	36S			Happy Camp Airport	GA	0
Hayfork	F62			Hayfork Airport	GA	0
Healdsburg	HES		KHES	Healdsburg Municipal Airport	GA	0
Hemet	HMT	HMT	KHMT	Hemet-Ryan Airport	GA	0
Hollister	CVH	**HLI**	KCVH	Hollister Municipal Airport	GA	0
Hoopa	O21			Hoopa Airport	GA	0
Independence	2O7			Independence Airport	GA	0
Inyokern	IYK	IYK	KIYK	Inyokern Airport	GA	0
Jackson	JAQ		KJAQ	Amador County Airport (Westover Field)	GA	0
Kernville	L05			Kern Valley Airport	GA	9
King City	KIC	KIC	KKIC	Mesa Del Rey Airport	GA	0
Lakeport	1O2	**CKE**		Lampson Field	GA	0
Lancaster	WJF	WJF	KWJF	General William J. Fox Airfield	GA	6
Lee Vining	O24			Lee Vining Airport	GA	0
Little River	LLR		KLLR	Little River Airport	GA	12
Lompoc	LPC	LPC	KLPC	Lompoc Airport	GA	0
Lone Pine	O26			Lone Pine Airport	GA	0
Los Banos	LSN	LSN	KLSN	Los Banos Municipal Airport	GA	0
Madera	MAE	MAE	KMAE	Madera Municipal Airport	GA	1
Mammoth Lakes	MMH	MMH	KMMH	**Mammoth Yosemite Airport**	GA	3,632
Marina	OAR	OAR	KOAR	Marina Municipal Airport (was Fritzche AAF)	GA	1
Mariposa	MPI		KMPI	Mariposa-Yosemite Airport	GA	0
Marysville	MYV	MYV	KMYV	Yuba County Airport	GA	0
Mendota	M90			William Robert Johnston Municipal Airport (was Mendota Airport)	GA	0
Modesto	MOD	MOD	KMOD	Modesto City–County Airport (Harry Sham Field)	GA	27
Mojave	MHV	MHV	KMHV	Mojave Airport	GA	216
Montague	SIY	SIY	KSIY	Siskiyou County Airport	GA	5
Murrieta / Temecula	F70	**RBK**		French Valley Airport	GA	141
Needles	EED	EED	KEED	Needles Airport	GA	0
Oakdale	O27			Oakdale Airport	GA	0
Oceano	L52			Oceano County Airport	GA	0
Oceanside	OKB	**OCN**	KOKB	Oceanside Municipal Airport	GA	0
Orland	O37			Haigh Field	GA	0
Oroville	OVE	OVE	KOVE	Oroville Municipal Airport	GA	0
Oxnard	OXR	OXR	KOXR	Oxnard Airport	GA	63
Palm Springs / Thermal	TRM	TRM	KTRM	Jacqueline Cochran Regional Airport	GA	204
Palmdale	PMD	PMD	KPMD	Palmdale Regional Airport / USAF Plant 42	GA	0
Paso Robles	PRB	PRB	KPRB	Paso Robles Municipal Airport	GA	46
Placerville	PVF	PVF	KPVF	Placerville Airport	GA	0
Porterville	PTV	PTV	KPTV	Porterville Municipal Airport	GA	12
Quincy	2O1			Gansner Field	GA	0
Rancho Murieta	RIU		KRIU	Rancho Murieta Airport	GA	2
Red Bluff	RBL	RBL	KRBL	Red Bluff Municipal Airport	GA	4
Redding	O85			Benton Field (was Benton Airpark)	GA	0
Redlands / San Bernardino	REI	REI	KREI	Redlands Municipal Airport	GA	0
Reedley	O32			Reedley Municipal Airport	GA	0
Rio Vista	O88			Rio Vista Municipal Airport (Baumann Field)	GA	0
Ruth	T42			Ruth Airport	GA	0
Sacramento	MCC	MCC	KMCC	McClellan Airfield	GA	18
Salinas	SNS	SNS	KSNS	Salinas Municipal Airport	GA	2
San Andreas	CPU		KCPU	Calaveras County Airport (Maury Rasmussen Field)	GA	2
Santa Ynez	IZA	**SQA**	KIZA	Santa Ynez Airport	GA	31
Shafter	MIT	MIT	KMIT	Shafter Airport (Minter Field)	GA	0
Shelter Cove	0Q5			Shelter Cove Airport	GA	0
South Lake Tahoe	TVL	TVL	KTVL	Lake Tahoe Airport	GA	73
Susanville	SVE	SVE	KSVE	Susanville Municipal Airport	GA	0
Taft	L17			Taft Airport (Taft-Kern County Airport)	GA	0
Tehachapi	TSP	TSP	KTSP	Tehachapi Municipal Airport	GA	0
Tracy	TCY		KTCY	Tracy Municipal Airport	GA	0
Trinity Center	O86			Trinity Center Airport	GA	0
Trona	L72	**TRH**		Trona Airport	GA	0
Truckee	TRK	TRK	KTRK	**Truckee-Tahoe Airport**	GA	1,243
Tulare	TLR	TLR	KTLR	Mefford Field	GA	0
Tulelake	O81			Tulelake Municipal Airport	GA	0
Turlock	O15			Turlock Municipal Airport	GA	0
Twentynine Palms	TNP	TNP	KTNP	Twentynine Palms Airport	GA	0
Ukiah	UKI	UKI	KUKI	Ukiah Municipal Airport	GA	0
Vacaville	VCB		KVCB	Nut Tree Airport	GA	3
Visalia	D86			Sequoia Field	GA	0
Visalia	VIS	VIS	KVIS	Visalia Municipal Airport	GA	15
Wasco	L19			Wasco Airport (Wasco-Kern County Airport)	GA	0
Watsonville	WVI	WVI	KWVI	Watsonville Municipal Airport	GA	3
Weaverville	O54			Weaverville Airport (Lonnie Pool Field)	GA	0
Weed	O46			Weed Airport	GA	0
Willits	O28			Willits Municipal Airport (Ells Field)	GA	0
Willows	WLW	WLW	KWLW	Willows-Glenn County Airport	GA	0
Woodlake	O42			Woodlake Airport	GA	0
Yuba City	O52			Sutter County Airport	GA	0
				**Other public-use airports** (not listed in NPIAS)		
Adin	A26			Adin Airport		18
Agua Caliente Springs	L54			Agua Caliente Airport		
Agua Dulce	L70			Agua Dulce Airpark		
Alturas	A24			California Pines Airport		
Angwin	2O3			Angwin-Parrett Field (Virgil O. Parrett Field)		
Avalon	AVX	**CIB**	KAVX	Catalina Airport		4
Baker	0O2			Baker Airport		
Bieber	O55			Southard Field		
Brownsville	F25			Brownsville Airport		
Buttonwillow	L62			Elk Hills-Buttonwillow Airport		
Calipatria	CLR	CLR	KCLR	Cliff Hatfield Memorial Airport		
Chiriaco Summit	L77			Chiriaco Summit Airport		
Coalinga	3O8			Harris Ranch Airport		
Death Valley National Park / Saline Valley				Chicken Strip		
Death Valley National Park	L06			Furnace Creek Airport		
Death Valley National Park	L09			Stovepipe Wells Airport		
Emigrant Gap	BLU	BLU	KBLU	Blue Canyon - Nyack Airport		
Eureka	O33			Eureka Municipal Airport		
Exeter	O63			Exeter Airport		
Famoso	L73			Poso Airport (Poso-Kern County Airport)		
Fort Bidwell	A28			Fort Bidwell Airport		0
Fresno	E79			Sierra Sky Park		
Gasquet	0O9			Ward Field		
Gualala	E55			Ocean Ridge Airport		11
Herlong	H37			Herlong Airport		
Hesperia	L26			Hesperia Airport		
Hollister	1C9			Frazier Lake Airpark		
Holtville	L04			Holtville Airport		
Hyampom	H47			Hyampom Airport		
Jacumba	L78			Jacumba Airport		
Joshua Tree	L80			Roy Williams Airport		
Klamath Glen	S51			Andy McBeth Airport		
Lodi	1O3			Lodi Airport		
Lodi	L53			Lodi Airpark		
Lodi	O20			Kingdon Airpark		
Lost Hills	L84			Lost Hills Airport (Lost Hills-Kern County Airport)		
Markleeville	M45			Alpine County Airport		
Montague	1O5	**RKC**		Montague Airport (Yreka Rohrer Field)		
New Cuyama	L88			New Cuyama Airport		
Ocotillo Wells	L90			Ocotillo Airport		
Palm Springs	UDD	UDD	KUDD	Bermuda Dunes Airport		106
Perris	L65			Perris Valley Airport		
Ravendale	O39			Ravendale Airport		
Rio Linda	L36			Rio Linda Airport		
Riverside / Rubidoux	RIR	RIR	KRIR	Flabob Airport		
Rosamond	L00			Rosamond Skypark		
Salton City	SAS	SAS	KSAS	Salton Sea Airport		
Santa Paula	SZP	SZP	KSZP	Santa Paula Airport		
Schellville / Sonoma	0Q3			Sonoma Valley Airport		
Selma	0Q4			Selma Airport		
Shoshone	L61			Shoshone Airport		
Sierraville	O79			Sierraville Dearwater Airport		
Sonoma	0Q9			Sonoma Skypark		
Strathmore	1Q1			Eckert Field		
Susanville	1Q2			Spaulding Airport		
Tehachapi	L94			Mountain Valley Airport		
Tracy	1Q4			New Jerusalem Airport		
Upper Lake	1Q5			Gravelly Valley Airport		
Woodland	O41			Watts-Woodland Airport		29
Yucca Valley	L22			Yucca Valley Airport		
				**Other government/military airports**		
Bridgeport	7CL4			MCMWTC Heliport		
Camp Roberts	CA62			McMillan Airport		
Camp Roberts / San Miguel	SYL	SYL	KSYL	Roberts AHP		
Camp San Luis Obispo	CSL	CSL	KCSL	O'Sullivan AHP		
China Lake	NID		KNID	NAWS China Lake (Armitage Field)		199
Concord	60CA			Q Area Heliport		
Coronado	CL16			Turner Field / Amphibious Base Heliport		
Crows Landing	NCR	NCR	KNCR	NASA Crows Landing Airport (was NALF Crows Landing)		
Edwards	EDW	EDW	KEDW	Edwards AFB		48
Edwards	9L2			Edwards AFB Aux. North Base		
El Centro	NJK	NJK	KNJK	NAF El Centro		275
Fairfield	SUU	SUU	KSUU	Travis Air Force Base		1,211
Fort Hunter Liggett / Jolon	HGT	HGT	KHGT	Tusi Army Heliport (Hunter Liggett)		
Fort Irwin / Barstow, California	BYS	BYS	KBYS	Bicycle Lake Army Airfield		
Herlong	AHC	AHC	KAHC	Amedee Army Airfield (Sierra Army Depot)		
Imperial Beach	NRS	NRS	KNRS	NOLF Imperial Beach (Ream Field)		
Lemoore	NLC	NLC	KNLC	NAS Lemoore (Reeves Field)		
Lompoc	VBG	VBG	KVBG	Vandenberg Air Force Base		0
Los Alamitos	SLI		KSLI	Los Alamitos Army Airfield		77
Marysville	BAB	BAB	KBAB	Beale Air Force Base		0
Mountain View	NUQ	NUQ	KNUQ	Moffett Federal Airfield		175
Oceanside	NFG		KNFG	MCAS Camp Pendleton (Munn Field)		
Pleasanton	4CA3			Camp Parks Heliport		
Point Mugu	NTD	NTD	KNTD	NAS Point Mugu		981
San Clemente Island	NUC		KNUC	NALF San Clemente Island (Frederick Sherman Field)		0
San Diego	NKX	NKX	KNKX	MCAS Miramar (Joe Foss Field)		756
San Diego	NZY	NZY	KNZY	NAS North Island (Halsey Field)		759
San Nicolas Island	NSI		KNSI	NOLF San Nicolas Island		
Twentynine Palms	NXP		KNXP	Twentynine Palms SELF		
				**Notable private-use airports**		
Blythe	44CA			W. R. Byron Airport (Gary Field)		
Clarksburg	CN13			Borges–Clarksburg Airport (former public-use, was FAA: C14)		
Chico	CL56			Ranchaero Airport (former public-use, was FAA: O23)		
Desert Center	CN64			Desert Center Airport (former public-use, was FAA: L64)		4
El Centro	23CN			Douthitt Strip		
Los Angeles	4CA0			LAPD Hooper Heliport		
Palmdale	GXA		KGXA	Grey Butte Field (General Atomics Aeronautical Systems) (was FAA: 04CA)		
Paradise	CA92			Paradise Skypark (former public-use, was FAA: L24)		
San Diego	CA84			Torrey Pines Gliderport		
San Pedro	6CA3			Catalina Air-Sea Terminal Heliport		
Watsonville	CA66			Monterey Bay Academy Airport		
				**Notable former airports**		
Alameda	~~NGZ~~			NAS Alameda (closed 1997)		
Alum Rock				Alum Rock Airport (closed approx 1936)		
Anaheim				Disneyland Heliport		
Elk Grove	~~E27~~			Elk Grove Airport		
Glendale				Grand Central Airport (closed 1959)		
Hobergs				Paul Hoberg Airport		
Huntington Beach	~~L16~~			Meadowlark Airport (closed 1989)		
Novato				Hamilton Air Force Base (closed 1988)		
Pixley	~~P27~~			Pixley Airport (Harmon Field) (closed)		
Rialto	~~L67~~			Rialto Municipal Airport (Miro Field) (closed 2014)	~~R~~	
San Francisco	~~JFO~~			Crissy Field (closed 1974)		
Santa Ana	~~NZJ~~	~~NZJ~~	~~KNZJ~~	MCAS El Toro (decommissioned 1999)		
Scotts Valley				Santa Cruz Sky Park (closed 1983)		
Shingletown	~~0Q6~~			Shingletown Airport (closed 2002)	~~GA~~	
Taft				Gardner Army Airfield (opened 1941)		

=== Airport in Mexico with terminal in California ===
Since 2015, the Tijuana Cross-border Terminal in Otay Mesa gives direct access to Tijuana International Airport, with passengers walking across the U.S.–Mexico border on a footbridge to catch their flight on the Mexican side.

== See also ==
- California World War II Army Airfields
- Essential Air Service
- List of airports in the Los Angeles area
- List of airports in the San Francisco Bay Area
- List of airports in the San Diego area
- List of airports of Santa Cruz County, California
