= Southard =

Southard is a surname, and may refer to:

- The Southards of New Jersey:
  - Henry Southard (1747–1842) (father), American politician from New Jersey; U.S. representative 1801–11
  - Isaac Southard (1783–1850) (son of Henry), American politician from New Jersey; U.S. representative 1831–33
  - Samuel L. Southard (1787–1842) (son of Henry), American politician from New Jersey; U.S. senator and governor of New Jersey
    - USS Southard (DD-207), a U.S. Navy ship named after Samuel L. Southard
- David Southard (1845–1894), American soldier in the Union army during the American Civil War; recipient of the Medal of Honor
- Elmer Ernest Southard (1876–1920), American neuropsychiatrist and author
- James H. Southard (1851–1919), American politician from Ohio; U.S. representative 1895–1907
- Jared Southard (born 2000), American baseball player
- Lucien Southard (1827–1881), American orchestra conductor
- Lyda Southard (1892–1958), American serial killer
- Mabel Madeline Southard (1877–1967), American Methodist minister
- Milton I. Southard (1836–1905), American politician from Ohio; U.S. representative 1873–79
- Susan Southard, American author
- T. J. Southard (1808–1896), American ship builder from Maine
  - Ellen Southard, ship built by T.J. Southard

Southard may also refer to:

- Cape Southard, Antarctica
- Mount Southard, Antarctica
- Southard Promontory, Antarctica
- Southard Field, California, United States
- Southard, Missouri, United States
- Southard, New Jersey, United States
- Southard, Oklahoma, United States
