= L36 =

L36 may refer to:

- 60S ribosomal protein L36
- Buick L36 engine
- HMS Leith (L36), a sloop of the Royal Navy
- Rio Linda Airport, in Sacramento County, California
- Scania-Vabis L36, a Swedish truck
