= 009 =

009 may refer to:

- OO9, gauge model railways
- Round Valley Airport (FAA identifier "O09")
- Ward Field; see List of airports in California (FAA identifier "0O9")
- British secret agent 009; see 00 Agent
- BA 009; see British Airways Flight 9
- Tyrrell 009, a Formula One racing car
- Yaser Esam Hamdi, Guantanamo detainee 009
- Zeekr 009, an all-electric luxury minivan

== See also ==
- Cyborg 009, a 1964 manga
- 009-1, a 2006 anime
- Junkers EF 009, a jetfighter
- 009 Sound System, a songwriting project by Alexander Perls
