= Q95 =

Q95 may refer to:

== Radio stations ==
- KQSF, in Sioux Falls, South Dakota
- WFBQ, in Indianapolis, Indiana
- WKQI, in Detroit, Michigan
- WQHY, in Prestonsburg, Kentucky
- WQTE, in Adrian, Michigan

== Other uses ==
- At-Tin, the 95th surah of the Quran
- French submarine Astrée (1915)
- Ruth Airport, a public airport in Trinity County, California
