= 36S =

36S, 36-S or 36.S may refer to:

- Happy Camp Airport (FAA identifier: 36S), an airport in Siskiyou County, California, U.S.
- 36th parallel south, a line of latitude
- Sulfur-36 (S-36 or ^{36}S), an isotope of sulfur

== See also ==
- S36 (disambiguation)
