= L71 =

L71 may refer to:

- California City Municipal Airport's FAA location identifier;
- Zeppelin LZ 113's tactical numbering.
