= L45 =

L45 may refer to:

- the Bakersfield Municipal Airport FAA LID
- Lactobacillus sakei L45, a strain of the bacterium Lactobacillus sakei
