= Riu =

Riu or RIU may refer to:

== People ==
- Riu (surname), a Korean surname
- Giovanni de Riu (1925–2008), Italian racing driver
- Ramon Riu i Cabanes (1852–1901), Bishop of Urgell and ex officio Co-Prince of Andorra
- Victor Riu (born 1985), French golfer

== Other uses ==
- Rancho Murieta Airport, in California, United States
- Riau Airlines, defunct Indonesian airline
- Riu de Cerdanya, in Catalonia, Spain
- RIU Hotels, a Spanish hotel chain
- Rio (disambiguation)
- Ríos (disambiguation)
