= P27 =

P27 may refer to:

- CDKN1B, cyclin-dependent kinase inhibitor 1B
- ČZ vz. 27, a pistol
- IFI27, interferon alpha-inducible protein 27
- Papyrus 27, a biblical manuscript
- Phosphorus-27, an isotope of phosphorus
- Pixley Airport, in Tulare County, California, United States
- Projekt-27, an intelligence-gathering unit of the Swiss Armed Forces
