= Bakersfield Airport =

Bakersfield Airport can refer to multiple airports in or near Bakersfield, California:

- Meadows Field (IATA: BFL, ICAO: KBFL, FAA LID: BFL), Bakersfield's primary commercial airport, for both domestic and international flights
- Bakersfield Municipal Airport (FAA LID: L45), a general aviation airport in Southeast Bakersfield
