= Gansner Field =

- IATA: GNF; ICAO: none; FAA LID: 2O1

Summary
- Airport type: Public
- Owner: County of Plumas
- Serves: Quincy, California
- Location: Plumas County, California
- Elevation AMSL: 3,419 ft (1,042 m)
- Coordinates: 39°56′38″N 120°56′43″W

Map
- Location of airport in California

Runways
Direction	Length		Surface
Direction	ft	m	Surface
6/24	4,105	1,251	Asphalt

Statistics (2011)
- Aircraft operations: 9,000
- Based aircraft: 29
- Source: Federal Aviation Administration

Gansner Field (IATA: GNF, FAA LID: 2O1) is a public use airport owned by and located in Plumas County, California, United States. The airport is one nautical mile (2 km) north of the center of Quincy, California. It is included in the National Plan of Integrated Airport Systems for 2011–2015, which categorized it as a general aviation facility.

== Facilities and aircraft ==
Gansner Field covers an area of 88 acres (36 ha) at an elevation of 3,419 feet (1,042 m) above mean sea level. It has one runway designated 7/25 with an asphalt surface measuring 4,105 by 60 feet (1,251 x 18 m).

For the 12-month period ending December 31, 2011, the airport had 9,000 aircraft operations, an average of 24 per day: 94% general aviation, 4% air taxi, and 1% military. At that time there were 29 aircraft based at this airport: 93% single-engine, 3 multi-engine, and 3% ultralight.

== See also ==
- List of airports in California
