= Cliff Hatfield Memorial Airport =

Airport in California, United States

- IATA: CLR; ICAO: KCLR; FAA LID: CLR

Summary
- Airport type: Public
- Owner: City of Calipatria
- Serves: Calipatria, California
- Elevation AMSL: −182 ft (−55 m)
- Coordinates: 33°07′53″N 115°31′17″W

Map
- Location of airport in California

Runways
Direction	Length		Surface
Direction	ft	m	Surface
8/26	3,423	1,043	Asphalt

Statistics (2010)
- Aircraft operations: 1,300
- Source: Federal Aviation Administration

Cliff Hatfield Memorial Airport (IATA: CLR, ICAO: KCLR, FAA LID: CLR) is a city-owned, public-use airport located one nautical mile (2 km) northwest of the central business district of Calipatria, a city in Imperial County, California, United States. It is also approximately 5 statute miles (8 km) southeast of the Salton Sea.

== Facilities and aircraft ==
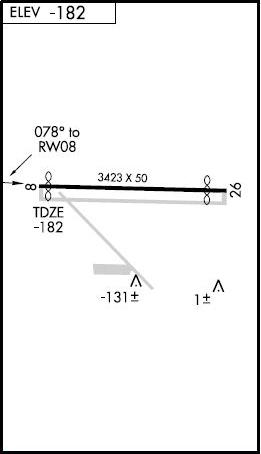
Runway diagram

Cliff Hatfield Memorial Airport covers an area of 200 acres (81 ha) at an elevation of 182 feet 55 m) below mean sea level. It has one runway designated 8/26 with an asphalt surface measuring 3,423 by 50 feet (1,043 x 15 m). For the 12-month period ending December 30, 2010, the airport had 1,300 general aviation aircraft operations, an average of 108 per month.

== See also ==
- List of airports in California
