= List of airports in Kern County, California =

The following is a list of airports in Kern County, California:

== International airports ==
- Meadows Field (IATA: BFL, ICAO: KBFL, FAA LID: BFL) is the primary commercial airport serving the county and is one of two international airports serving the San Joaquin Valley. It is located approximately 5 miles northwest of Downtown Bakersfield.

== Domestic commercial airports ==
- Inyokern Airport (IATA: IYK, ICAO: KIYK, FAA LID: IYK) is a small airport located near Inyokern and Ridgecrest, in the Mojave Desert. Although it is mostly used as a general aviation airport, it once had scheduled passenger service and maintains regional cargo service.

== Spaceports ==
- Mojave Air and Space Port (IATA: MHV, ICAO: KMHV) is the first inland spaceport in America, the site where SpaceShipOne made three crewed space flights in 2004. It is also used as a general aviation airport, experimental aircraft design and testing center, and aircraft storage. It is located in the town of Mojave, in the Mojave Desert.
- see also Edwards Air Force Base, landing site for the North American X-15 and Space Shuttle, listed below under Military airfields

== Military airfields ==
- Edwards Air Force Base (IATA: EDW, ICAO: KEDW, FAA LID: EDW) is an airfield used by the United States Air Force. It is used for testing experimental military aircraft. Nasa's Dryden Research Center is also located on the base, and is used for testing experimental aircraft for NASA. It is located east of Rosamond and southeast of Mojave, in the Mojave Desert.
- Naval Air Weapons Station China Lake (ICAO: KNID, FAA LID: NID) is a naval airborne weapons test center used by the United States Navy. It is located just north of Ridgecrest and Inyokern.

== General aviation airports ==
- Bakersfield Municipal Airport (FAA LID: L45) is in Southeast Bakersfield.
- California City Municipal Airport (FAA LID: L71) is in California City.
- Delano Municipal Airport (ICAO: KDLO, FAA LID: DLO) is in Delano.
- Elk Hills-Buttonwillow Airport (FAA LID: L62) is in Buttonwillow.
- Kern Valley Airport (FAA LID: L05) is in Kernville.
- Lost Hills Airport (FAA LID: L84) is in Lost Hills.
- Mountain Valley Airport (FAA LID: L94) is in Tehachapi.
- Poso Airport (FAA LID: L73) is in Poso.
- Rosamond Skypark Airport (FAA LID: L00) is in Rosamond.
- Shafter Airport (IATA: MIT, ICAO: KMIT, FAA LID: MIT), also known as Minter Field, is in Shafter.
- Taft Airport (FAA LID: L17) is in Taft
- Tehachapi Municipal Airport (IATA: TSP, ICAO: KTSP, FAA LID: TSP) is in Tehachapi.
- Wasco Airport (FAA LID: L19) is in Wasco.
