= S36 =

S36 may refer to:

== Aviation ==
- Blériot-SPAD S.36, a French reconnaissance aircraft
- Junkers S 36, a German mail plane
- Norm Grier Field, in King County, Washington, United States
- Short S.36, a British biplane
- Sikorsky S-36, an American amphibious sesquiplane

== Chemistry ==
- S36: Wear suitable protective clothing, a safety phrase
- Sulfur-36, an isotope of sulfur

== Naval vessels ==
- SMS S36 (1914), a torpedo boat of the Imperial German Navy
- USS S-36 (SS-141), a submarine of the United States Navy

== Other uses ==
- S36 (ZVV), a line of the Zürich S-Bahn
- IBM System/36, a minicomputer
- Woiwurrung language
- S36, a postcode district in Sheffield, England

== See also ==
- 36S (disambiguation)
