= Roberts Army Heliport =

- IATA: SYL; ICAO: KSYL; FAA LID: SYL

Summary
- Airport type: Military
- Owner: United States Army
- Location: Camp Roberts / San Miguel, California
- Elevation AMSL: 630 ft / 192 m
- Coordinates: 35°48′54″N 120°44′38″W
- Interactive map of Roberts Army Heliport

Helipads
Number	Length		Surface
Number	ft	m	Surface
H1	2,740	835	Asphalt
- Source: Federal Aviation Administration

Roberts Army Heliport (IATA: SYL, ICAO: KSYL, FAA LID: SYL) is a U.S. Army heliport at Camp Roberts in extreme southern Monterey County, California, United States. It is located just off U.S. Route 101, four nautical miles (7 km) northwest of the central business district of San Miguel, about halfway between it and the tiny community of Bradley in southern Monterey County. Roberts AHP has one helipad designated H1 with a 2,740 x 100 ft (835 x 30 m) asphalt surface.
