= Elk Grove Airport =

- IATA: none; ICAO: none; FAA LID: E27

Summary
- Airport type: Public
- Owner: Daniel R. Lang
- Serves: Elk Grove, California
- Elevation AMSL: 54 ft / 16 m
- Coordinates: 38°23′32″N 121°19′51″W
- Interactive map of Elk Grove Airport

Runways
Direction	Length		Surface
Direction	ft	m	Surface
11/29	2,769	844	Asphalt
- Source: Federal Aviation Administration

Elk Grove Airport (FAA LID: E27) was a privately owned public-use airport two miles southeast of Elk Grove, in Sacramento County, California. It closed, effective 7/1/10.

== Facilities ==
Elk Grove Airport covered 108 acres (44 ha) at an elevation of 54 feet (16 m). Its one runway, 11/29, was 2,769 by 35 feet (844 x 11 m).

In 2001 the airport averaged 82 aircraft operations per day. 64 aircraft were then based at this airport: 60 single-engine, 1 multi-engine, 1 helicopter, and 2 ultralight.
