= Rosamond Skypark =

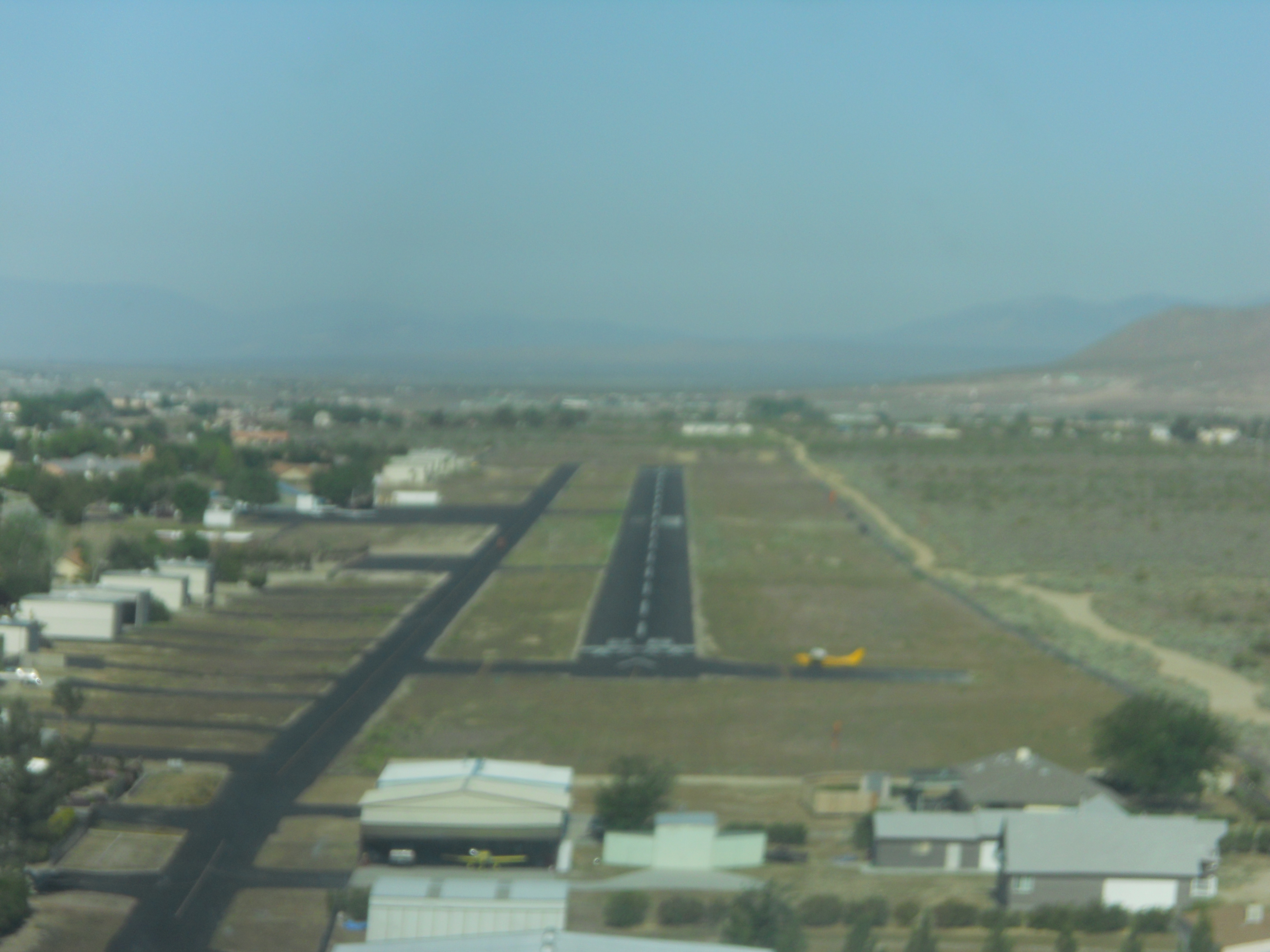
- Looking down runway 26
- IATA: none; ICAO: none; FAA LID: L00

Summary
- Airport type: Public
- Owner: Rosamond Skypark Assn.
- Serves: Rosamond, California
- Elevation AMSL: 2,415 ft / 736 m
- Coordinates: 34°52′14″N 118°12′20″W
- Website: www.skypark.org
- Interactive map of Rosamond Skypark

Runways
Direction	Length		Surface
Direction	ft	m	Surface
8/26	3,600	1,097	Asphalt

Statistics (2023)
- Aircraft operations (year ending 5/25/2023): 10,500
- Based aircraft: 71
- Source: Federal Aviation Administration

Rosamond Skypark (FAA LID: L00) is a residential airpark and public-use airport located three nautical miles (6 km) west of the central business district of Rosamond, in Kern County, California, United States. It is privately owned by the Rosamond Skypark Association.

== Facilities and aircraft ==
Rosamond Skypark covers an area of 100 acres (40 ha) at an elevation of 2,415 feet (736 m) above mean sea level. It has one runway designated 8/26 with an asphalt surface measuring 3,600 by 50 feet (1,097 x 15 m).

For the 12-month period ending May 25, 2023, the airport had 10,500 general aviation aircraft operations, an average of 29 per day. At that time there were 71 aircraft based at this airport: 63 single-engine, 3 multi-engine, 1 helicopter, 2 glider, and 2 ultralight.

The facility was designed by aeronautical engineer Sam Ramsey, who resided at the sleepy airport for years prior to the development. He envisioned an airport where pilots could commute to Los Angeles while enjoying the quiet High Desert as a residence.

== See also ==
- List of airports in Kern County, California
