= Ellen Southard =

American merchant ship (1863–1875)

Coordinates: 53°28′12″N 3°02′45″W

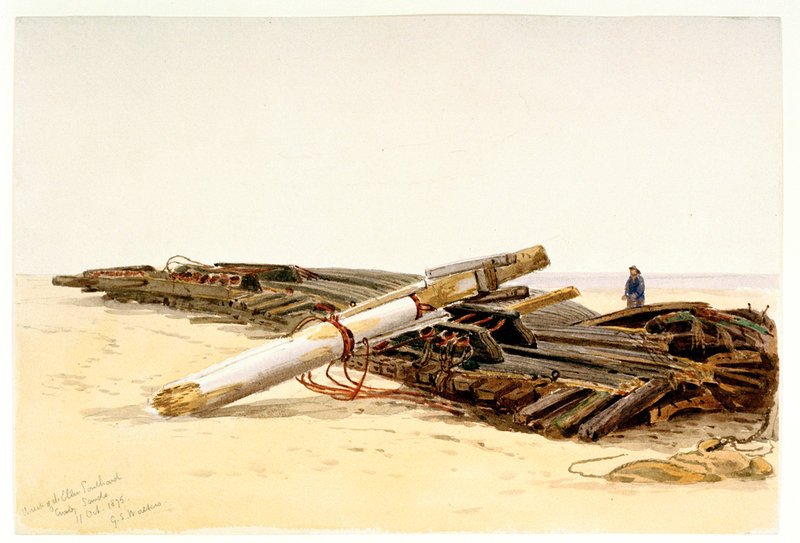
- Watercolour painting of Ellen Southard wreckage lying on Crosby Sands, Liverpool, on 11 October 1875

History

United States
- Namesake: Ellen J. Southard, daughter of T.J. Southard
- Owner: Thomas J. Southard
- Builder: T.J. Southard
- Launched: 1863
- Home port: Bath, Maine
- Identification: 8229
- Fate: Wrecked at Liverpool, 27 September 1875

General characteristics
- Class & type: Full-rigged ship
- Tonnage: 828 tons
- Length: 159 ft (48 m)
- Beam: 33 ft (10 m)
- Draught: 20 ft (6.1 m)
- Depth of hold: 23 ft (7.0 m)
- Propulsion: Sail
- Crew: 15

Ellen Southard was an American full-rigged merchant ship from Bath, Maine, that was built in 1863 by prominent shipbuilder T.J. Southard. She plied international trade routes for twelve years, calling at ports as far away as Sydney.

On 27 September 1875, the ship wrecked in the mouth of the Mersey River at Liverpool during a hurricane-strength storm. Shore-based lifeboats crewed mainly by volunteers set out from several lifeboat stations to the aid of the distressed ship after it foundered on a sandbank. One of the lifeboats capsized in heavy seas after picking up the ship's crew, resulting in nine people from the ship as well as three rescuers losing their lives.

Following the advice of the US consul at Liverpool, the United States Congress recognised the acts of bravery by issuing 27 Gold Lifesaving Medals to the lifeboat men who attempted to save her crew, after a two-year delay during which US law first had to be changed to allow the newly instituted medals to be awarded to non-US citizens. Debate about lifeboat designs continued for many years until a self-righting design was eventually adopted.

== Description ==
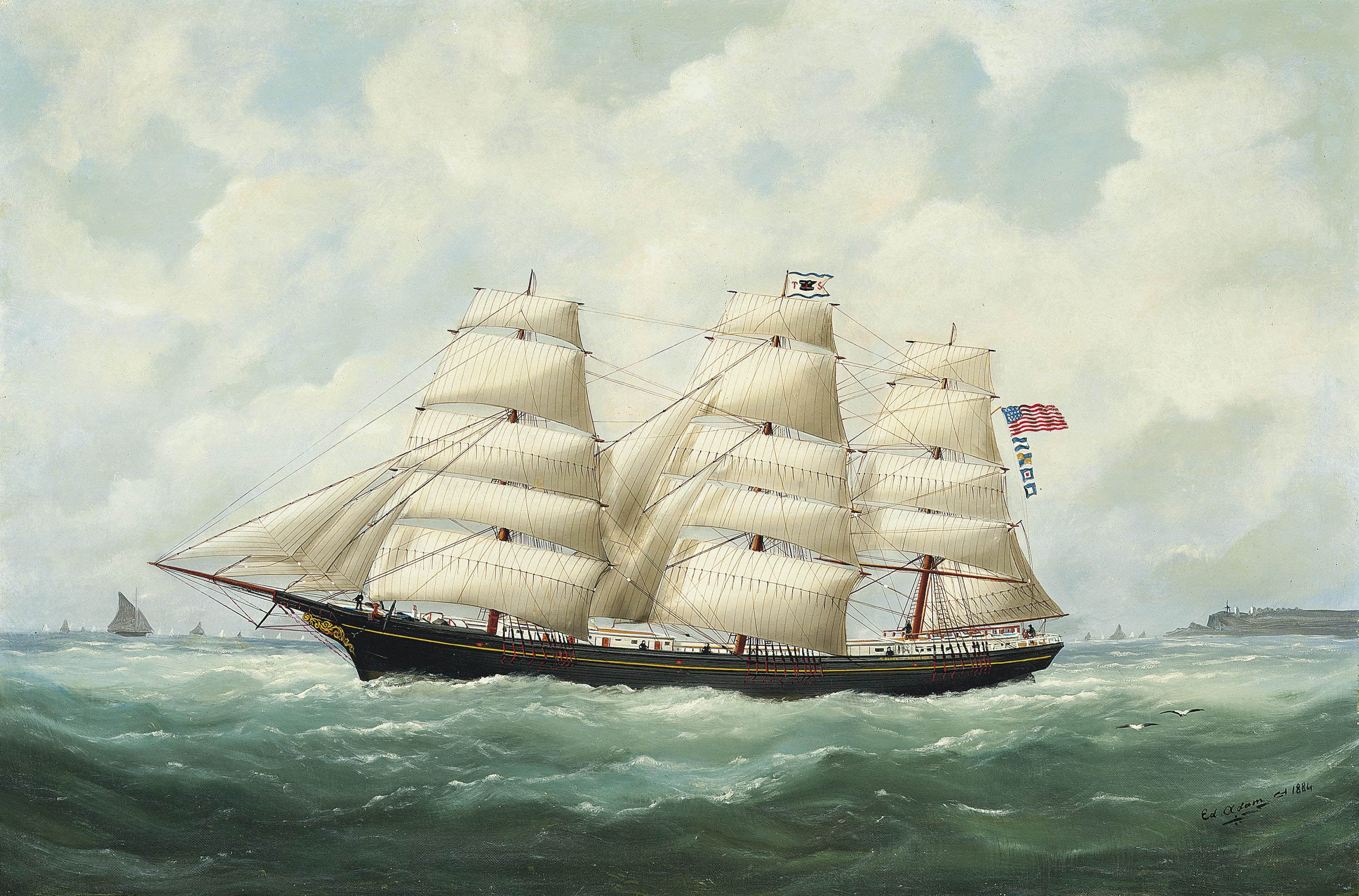
Olive S. Southard, a full-rigged ship built by T.J. Southard in 1871 and a stablemate of Ellen Southard

Ellen Southard was built in 1863 in Richmond, Maine, by prominent local shipbuilder T. J. Southard. She was named after the builder's daughter, Ellen, to whom he also gave a one-sixteenth share of the vessel. (Note: Other shareholders were T.J. Southard himself (5/16), his son (2/16), his second daughter (1/16), Benjamin Sewall (4/16), and her first master, Captain Edward Howe (3/16).) The ship was classified "A1" in the Lloyds Register, meaning that her hull and fittings were of the highest grade.

The Southard's first master was the 40-year-old Captain Edward Howe, originally from Beverly, Massachusetts. It was his second command, and he owned a 3/16 share of the ship. Upon assuming command, he was presented with a punchbowl that featured a depiction of the ship.

== Early service ==
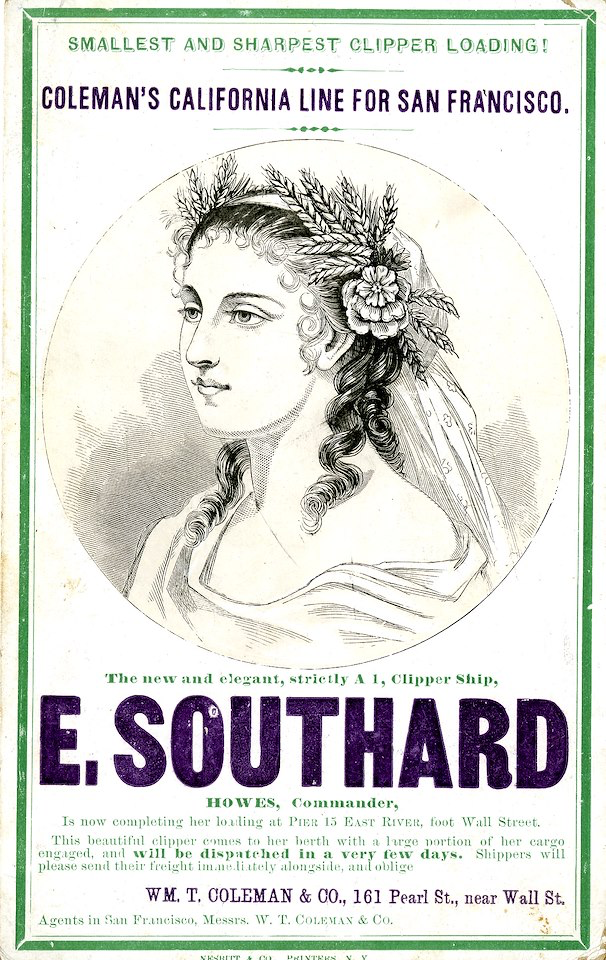
Printed card advertising freight capacity onboard Ellen Southard for an upcoming passage from New York to San Francisco

Ellen Southard plied international trade routes from her homeport in Bath, Maine, with visits documented in ports as far away as Sydney, Australia. In 1864, she recorded the longest duration voyage of any ship transporting railway locomotives from the east to the west coast of the United States prior to completion of the first transcontinental railroad. The ship took 205 days to complete the passage after she was delayed for 48 days by unfavourable winds off Cape Horn.

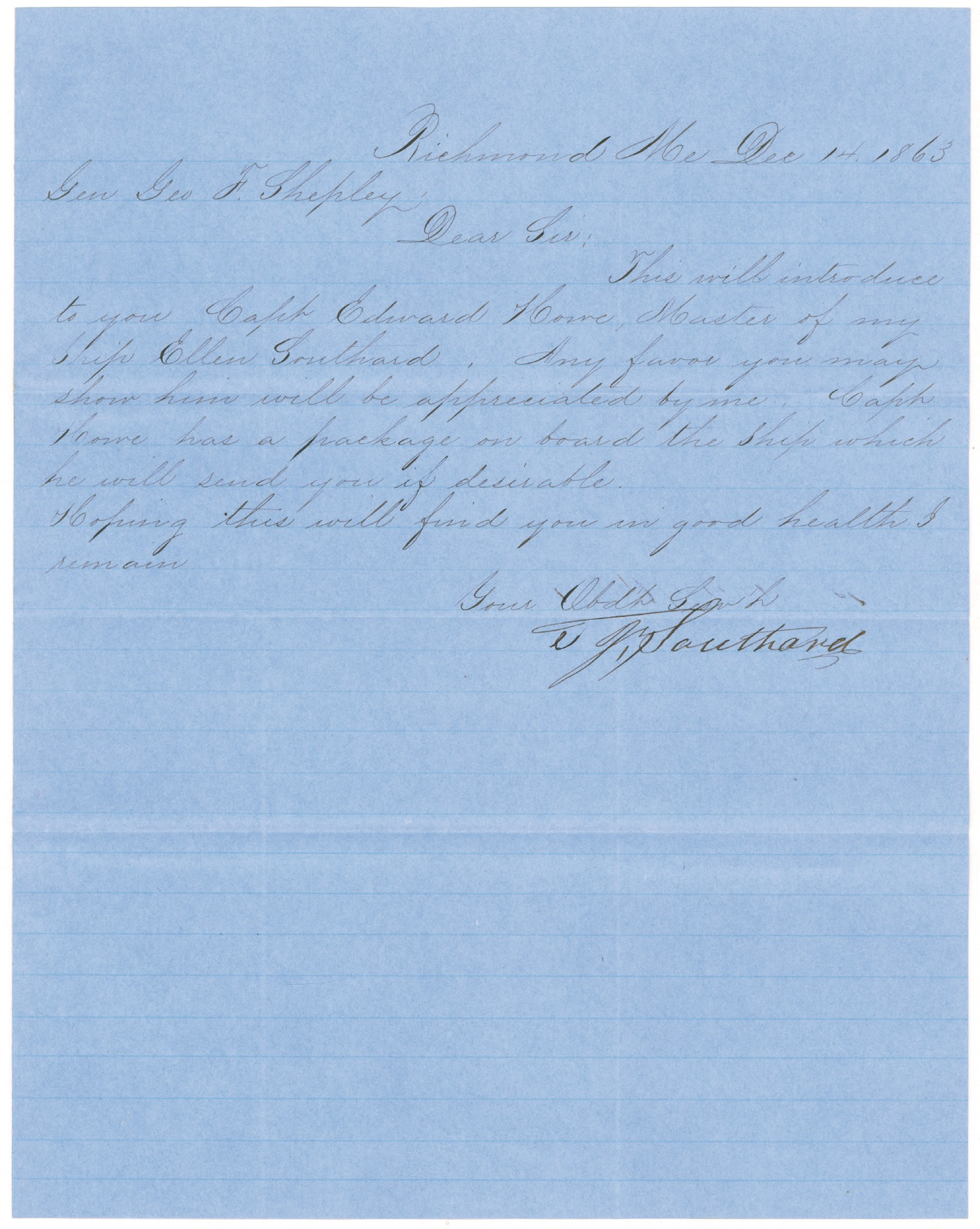
Letter of introduction for Captain Howe from T.J. Southard to General George F. Shepley during the American Civil War

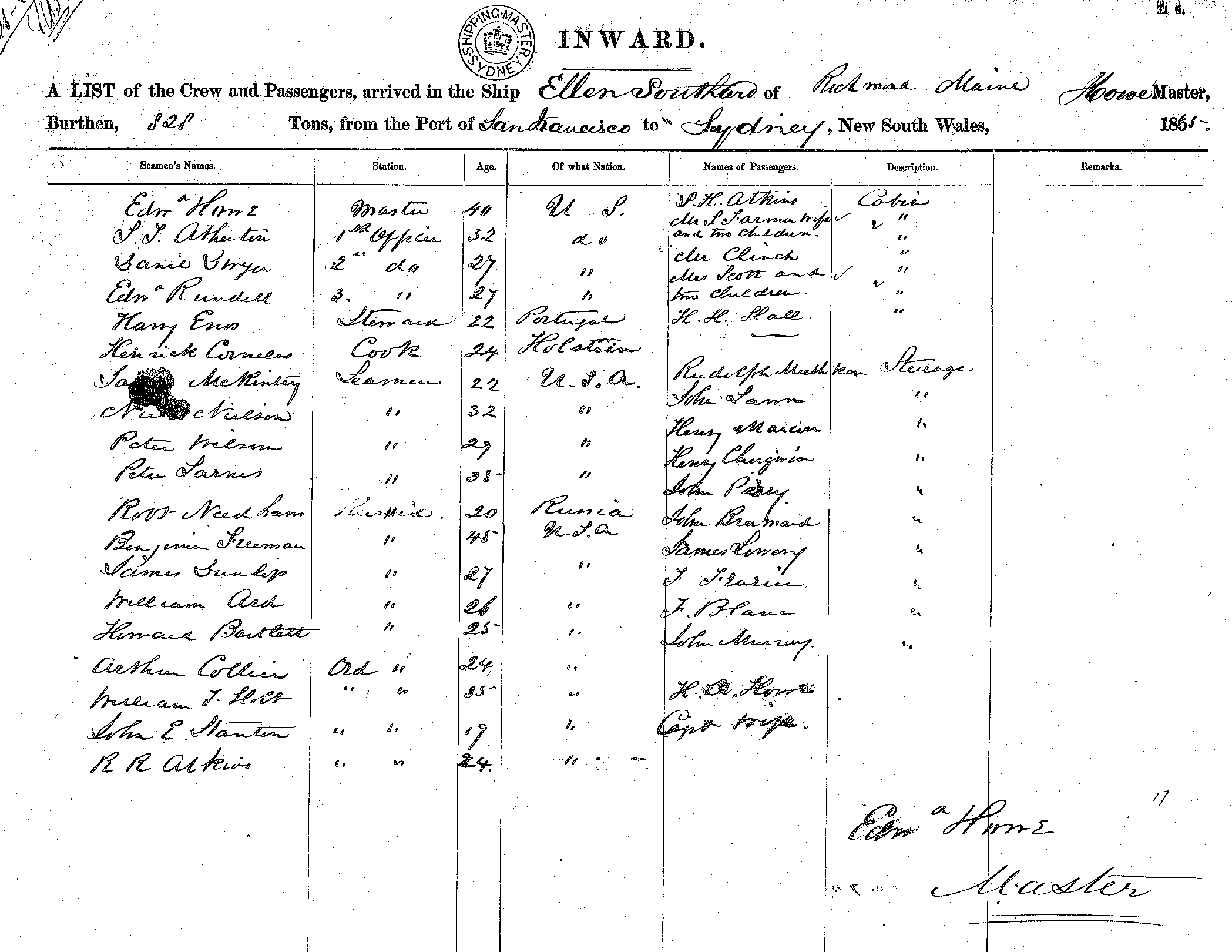
Arrival record submitted by Captain Howe for Ellen Southard when she arrived from San Francisco at the port of Sydney in 1865

On 6 June 1867, 38 days after departing Hong Kong for California with 360 Chinese passengers, Ellen Southard's master, Captain Edward Howe, died at sea. His wife, Hannah Masury Howe, was the only person on board who could navigate and therefore performed this function for the latter half of the passage across the Pacific. The ship made poor headway on account of the state of her sails, and after 65 days at sea, the water supply was dwindling; the passengers and crew became mutinous. Hannah resorted to using a revolver to keep them at bay until a passing ship encountered Ellen Southard adrift 30 miles (48 km) west of the Farallon Islands flying a distress flag. The captain of the other ship raised the alarm upon reaching the port of San Francisco, whereupon the USRC Wayanda went to the assistance of the impromptu captain of the distressed ship. A log entry from 2 July, the day that help arrived, states:

"6am, went forward to turn the men to and they refused duty. They are the most mutinous rascals I was ever with."

Hannah subsequently sued successfully for her husband Edward's share of the ship's profits.

== Loss ==
On 12 August 1875, Ellen Southard set sail for Liverpool in England from Saint John, New Brunswick, under the command of Captain Henry Woodworth (Note: Some sources report his name as Captain Woodward) with a load of tropical deal, a type of softwood. The captain's wife and fifteen crew members were on board. She was approaching the River Mersey on 26 September 1875 when the most violent storm to hit the region in 36 years struck. It began at 9 pm, increasing rapidly in intensity to hurricane strength by midnight; the storm remained at this level until 2 am. Buildings were damaged ashore, with two people killed by falling masonry, while on the river, vessels were blown from their moorings and damaged by colliding with one another or with the quays.

The Southard had rounded the northern tip of Wales, passing Point Lynas at 1 pm on the day of the storm. After receiving the pilot on board, she was taken in tow by the steamtug United Kingdom under the command of Captain Griffiths for the final leg of her journey into the port of Liverpool. By 9 pm, conditions had become very stormy, and her sails were taken down; by the time she reached Formby, the ship could no longer be steered, and the tow line was also lost. Southard dropped her anchors, but they did not hold in the ever-strengthening storm. Finding that it was unable to offer further assistance, the tug set off for Liverpool with the purpose of returning with a lifeboat, but was soon grounded, thereby leaving the stricken American ship to fend for herself. By midnight when the storm reached its peak, Southard was dismasted and grounded on Jordan Flats (Note: A sandbank that existed at the time at the present day location of Taylor's Bank) about a mile from Crosby lighthouse. The waves crashed heavily on her, and she started to break up as she thumped on the sandbank. The crew were unable to signal for assistance until first light as the vessel did not carry any signal flares – in the interim, they lashed themselves to what remained of the ship to prevent being swept away by the heavy sea.

== Lifeboat disaster ==
At just after 5 am, the Mersey Docks and Harbour Board's lifeboat station received a telegram stating that a ship was in distress. Nine minutes later, the three-year-old tubular lifeboat (Note: A lifeboat design patented by Henry Richardson, that comprised two cylindrical tubes with multiple watertight compartments. Tubular lifeboats were valued for their sturdiness and safety in rough seas.) set out with fourteen volunteers under the command of Captain James Martin. The steam tug Rattler initially took the Liverpool boat in tow, as the properties that made it suitable as a lifeboat also made it very heavy to row. At approximately the same time that the Liverpool lifeboat was departing Mersey Docks, the New Brighton, Formby and Hoylake boats also got underway, with the New Brighton RNLI boat in tow behind Sprindrift. The hurricane had abated somewhat, but the sea was still heavy, which made the rowers' work very difficult in shallower water where the tugs could no longer assist them.

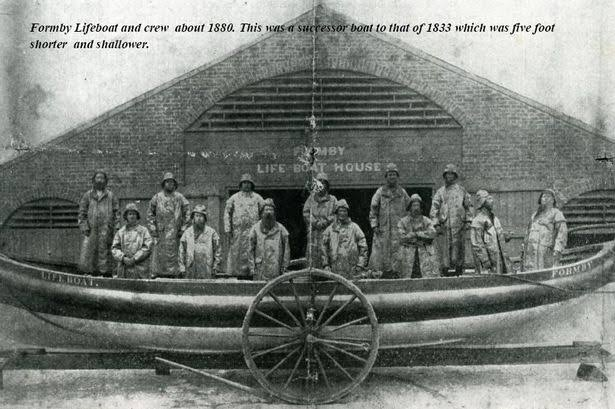
The Formby lifeboat and its crew circa 1880

When the Liverpool lifeboat came alongside the wreck, some of those aboard were able to jump directly into the lifeboat, but others had to be roped in. The steward, who was the last person on the doomed ship, decided to go back to recover his bag; minutes passed while the people in the lifeboat waited anxiously until he eventually re-appeared and joined them. Seventeen people including the pilot were taken onto the lifeboat. Finally, the lifeboat was able to get clear of the wreck and navigate its way through the floating debris to start its return journey to the dock. The New Brighton lifeboat was still about 500 yards (460 m) away when the Liverpool boat left the wreck, and thus coxswain Richard Thomas turned her around once it became apparent that everyone had already been taken off the ship successfully.

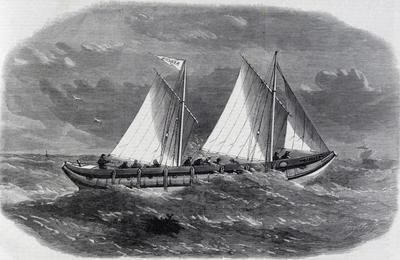
The tubular lifeboat from New Brighton at the time of the station's opening in 1863

The wind, tide and sea made it impossible for the Liverpool lifeboat to link up with the waiting tug for another tow, so the men were forced to start rowing home. About twenty minutes later, as the boat reached the relatively safer waters of the channel, the master elected to raise the foresail to help steady the vessel. People in the lifeboat were still congratulating themselves on their lucky escape, when Captain Martin noticed a huge wave "like a high wall" approaching. He instructed everyone to hold on, fearing that someone might be washed overboard. However rather than breaking over the boat, the wave lifted it and flipped it over. The boat was not self-righting, so the remaining survivors were left clinging desperately to the upturned boat. Rattler's master witnessed the incident and signalled to the New Brighton lifeboat, Willie and Arthur, which promptly turned around to come to the rescue. The men who were on the capsized boat directed the New Brighton lifeboat to first assist three others who were in more danger clinging to bits of wood in the sea. After picking up the survivors and one casualty, the New Brighton lifeboat was taken in tow by Rattler, which brought her back to New Brighton. Six of Ellen Southard's crew, the captain and his wife, as well as the pilot and three lifeboat men from Mersey Docks drowned or died of exposure (12 fatalities in total).

Labourers were employed to salvage the valuable wood that washed up on Crosby Beach; among the items found were a hat belonging to the captain's wife and a concertina belonging to one of the crew. Two bodies were also seen in the water.

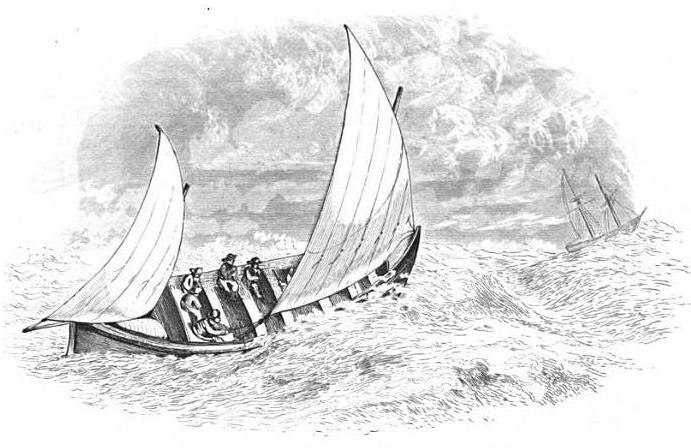
James Beeching's self-righting Lifeboat (1851)

A court of enquiry was held the following month in Liverpool by the Board of Trade, and focused particularly on the roles of the captains in the tragedy as well as the design of the Liverpool lifeboat. The court found that no-one was to blame for the loss of either Ellen Southard or the Liverpool lifeboat. Captain James Martin and his crew were praised for their gallantry in getting everyone off the ship, and absolved of any blame with respect to the capsizing of the lifeboat. The lifeboat was furthermore found to be of sound design and suitably adapted to her role, but debate continued for many years about the merits of the tubular design vs the self-righting one, as well as the requirement for lifeboats to be powered. After twelve years of deliberation, a decision was finally made to adopt self-righting lifeboats.

== Lifesaving medals ==
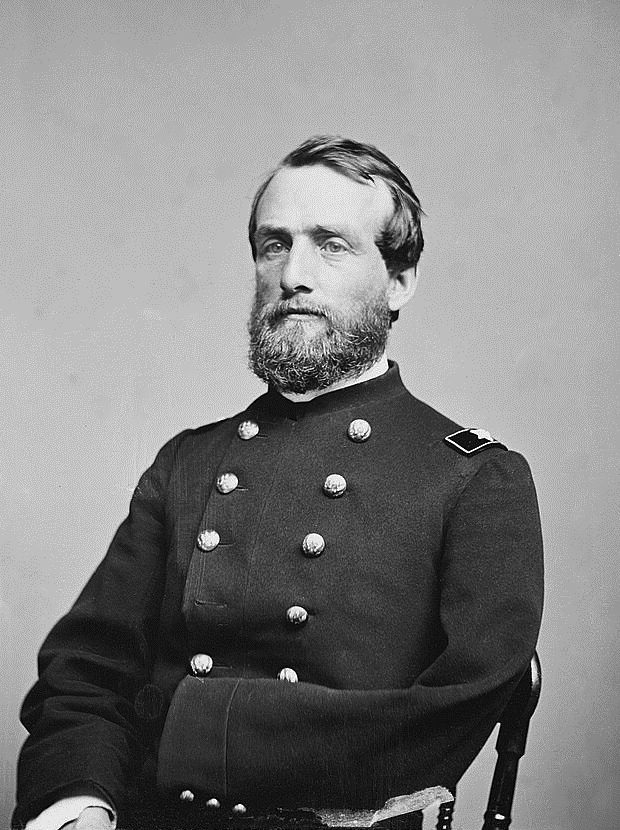
General Lucius Fairchild, who wrote the citation that led to Lifesaving Medals being awarded

General Lucius Fairchild, the United States consul at Liverpool, wrote to his government recommending that the gallantry of the Englishmen who were involved in the rescue effort be recognised. The Secretary of State supported his recommendation and the United States Congress moved to award the newly instituted (Note: The medal was created in 1874 and first awarded in 1876.) Lifesaving Medal to the lifeboat men. A delay of 17 months followed during which legislation was enacted to allow the medals to be issued to non-US nationals. Finally, in 1877, the United States government awarded first-class Gold Lifesaving Medals to the twenty-seven men of the Mersey Docks and New Brighton RNLI lifeboat station who survived the incident, while the families of the three deceased lifeboat men were awarded a sum of $200.00 in gold in lieu of a medal. Starting in 1877, the medal was reduced in size from 3 inches (76 mm) to 2 inches (51 mm), and its gold content reduced to 3 ounces (85 g). The medals were conferred in a public ceremony in Liverpool Town Hall on 27 February 1877 that was attended by the US Consul and the masters of most of the US ships that were in port at the time. The coins were incorrectly engraved with the ship's date of departure from New Brunswick (12 August) instead of the date of the tragedy (26 September).

Citation accompanying New Brighton medals

Sir: I have the honor to transmit herewith a life-saving medal of the first class which has been awarded to you, under the authority of the provisions of the seventh section of the Act of the Congress of the United States, approved June 20, 1874, for the extreme and heroic daring manifested by you in the rescue, under circumstances of peculiar danger and difficulty, of eight persons from the wreck of the American ship "Ellen Southard", at the mouth of the river Mersey, near Liverpool.

In transmitting this offering to you, as to each member of the crew of the Life-Boat of the Royal National Life-Boat Institution stationed at New Brighton, it is proper to remark that it is the first time an opportunity has arisen for bestowing the medal of the life-saving service of this country upon subjects of a foreign nation. It was the fortune of your crew to arrive upon the scene of disaster after the Liverpool life-boat men had effected a deliverance, and been in turn subjected to a dreadful casualty, whereby nine of the persons they had rescued and three of their own number were drowned: and the remaining eight persons from the vessel and the twelve men of the Liverpool crew, clinging to the capsized boat in a fearful sea, owe their lives to you and your comrades. The extreme jeopardy and hardships you encountered upon the occasion of their rescue are deeply appreciated, and, in behalf of the United States, I beg you to accept this testimonial, provided by law in recognition of such deeds of bravery and compassion. In sending it, allow me to add the expression of the sense of the gallantry and the devotion to high human duty which marked the conduct of yourself and of your comrades upon the occasion under notice, and of the assurance that each member of your crew, in his own person, by this deed of valor and mercy, confers fresh and just honor upon the great name of England.

I have the honor to be, Sir, your obedient servant,

— Charles F. Conant, Acting Secretary of the Treasury

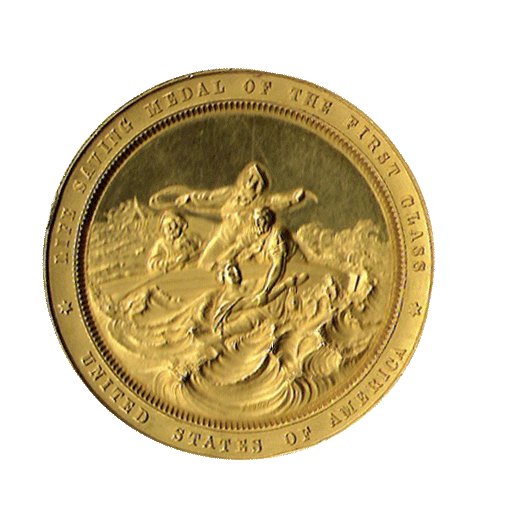
The gold Lifesaving Medal awarded to Charles Eddington, a crew member of the New Brighton lifeboat, in February 1877

Recipients
Lifeboat	Name	Award
Liverpool	James Martin (Master)	Gold Livesaving Medal
Liverpool	Hugh Beard	Gold Livesaving Medal
Liverpool	James Conley	Gold Livesaving Medal
Liverpool	William Gregory	Gold Livesaving Medal
Liverpool	Charles Danslow	Gold Livesaving Medal
Liverpool	John Dolman	Gold Livesaving Medal
Liverpool	George Lee	Gold Livesaving Medal
Liverpool	Philip Murphy	Gold Livesaving Medal
Liverpool	James Munday	Gold Livesaving Medal
Liverpool	William Ruffler	Gold Livesaving Medal
Liverpool	Samuel Richards	Gold Livesaving Medal
Liverpool	William Stewart	Gold Livesaving Medal
Liverpool	John Boyle (drowned)	$200 (equivalent to $6,047 in 2025) to his family
Liverpool	James Yates (drowned)	$200 (equivalent to $6,047 in 2025) to his family
Liverpool	Robert Moore (drowned)	$200 (equivalent to $6,047 in 2025) to his family
New Brighton	R.J. Thomas (Coxswain)	Gold Livesaving Medal
New Brighton	Charles Eddington	Gold Livesaving Medal
New Brighton	William Griffith	Gold Livesaving Medal
New Brighton	James Godfrey	Gold Livesaving Medal
New Brighton	W. Jones	Gold Livesaving Medal
New Brighton	John Dean	Gold Livesaving Medal
New Brighton	James Duncan	Gold Livesaving Medal
New Brighton	James Harvey	Gold Livesaving Medal
New Brighton	Robert Lucas	Gold Livesaving Medal
New Brighton	Thomas Maloney	Gold Livesaving Medal
New Brighton	Charles MacKenzie	Gold Livesaving Medal
New Brighton	John Powell	Gold Livesaving Medal
New Brighton	John Robinson	Gold Livesaving Medal
New Brighton	E. Crabtree	Gold Livesaving Medal
New Brighton	Henry Williams	Gold Livesaving Medal

== Fiction ==
- She took control of the ship with a pistol': the high seas heroine who inspired a savage pirate tale

== See also ==
- Southport and St Anne's lifeboats disaster
- Penlee lifeboat disaster
