= Chemehuevi Valley Airport =

Airport in Arizona, United States

- IATA: none; ICAO: none; FAA LID: 49X

Summary
- Airport type: Chemehuevi Indian Tribe
- Operator: Chemehuevi Valley, California
- Serves: Lake Havasu City, Arizona
- Location: 631
- Elevation AMSL: 192.3 ft (58.6 m)
- Coordinates: 34°31′39″N 114°25′52″W
- Interactive map of Chemehuevi Valley Airport

Runways
Direction	Length		Surface
Direction	ft	m	Surface
16/34	5,000	1,524	Asphalt

Chemehuevi Valley Airport (FAA LID: 49X) is a public airport located four miles (6.4 km) north of Chemehuevi Valley, serving as one of two airports in the Lake Havasu City, Arizona, United States metropolitan area. The airport is mostly used for general aviation.

== Facilities ==
Chemehuevi Valley Airport covers 144 acres (58 ha) and has one runway:

- Runway 16/34: 5,000 x 75 ft (1,524 × 23 m), surface: asphalt
