= Borges–Clarksburg Airport =

- IATA: none; ICAO: none; FAA LID: CN13

Summary
- Airport type: Private
- Owner: Joseph Borges
- Serves: Clarksburg, California
- Elevation AMSL: 12 ft (3.7 m)
- Coordinates: 38°26′36″N 121°30′32″W
- Interactive map of Borges–Clarksburg Airport

Runways
Direction	Length		Surface
Direction	ft	m	Surface
9/27	2,260	689	Turf

Statistics (2001)
- Aircraft operations: 3,000
- Based aircraft: 19
- Source: Federal Aviation Administration

Borges–Clarksburg Airport (FAA LID: CN13, formerly C14) is a private-use airport located two nautical miles (4 km) northeast of the central business district of Clarksburg, in Yolo County, California, United States.

The airport was established in 1945 and received a permit from the California Department of Transportation, Division of Aeronautics in 1949.

== Facilities and aircraft ==
Borges–Clarksburg Airport covers an area of 18 acres (7 ha) at an elevation of 12 feet (4 m) above mean sea level. It has one runway designated 9/27 with a turf surface measuring 2,260 by 90 feet (689 x 27 m).

For the 12-month period ending December 31, 2001, the airport had 3,000 general aviation aircraft operations, an average of 250 per month. At that time there were 19 aircraft based at this airport: 95% single-engine, and 5% ultralight.
