= Sutter County Airport =

- IATA: none; ICAO: none; FAA LID: O52

Summary
- Airport type: Public
- Operator: County of Sutter
- Location: Yuba City, California
- Elevation AMSL: 60 ft / 18 m
- Coordinates: 39°07′25″N 121°36′19″W
- Website: http://suttercountyairport.org
- Interactive map of Sutter County Airport

Runways
Direction	Length		Surface
Direction	ft	m	Surface
17/35	3,045	928	Asphalt

Sutter County Airport (FAA LID: O52) is a public airport located one mile (1.6 km) south of Yuba City, serving Sutter County, California, USA. This general aviation airport covers 175 acres (71 ha) and has one runway.
