= Taft Airport =

Taft Airport Taft-Kern County Airport
- IATA: none; ICAO: none; FAA LID: L17

Summary
- Airport type: Public
- Operator: County of Kern
- Location: Taft, California
- Elevation AMSL: 875 ft / 266.7 m
- Coordinates: 35°08′28″N 119°26′28″W
- Interactive map of Taft Airport

Runways
Direction	Length		Surface
Direction	ft	m	Surface
7/25	3,550	1,082	Asphalt

Taft Airport (FAA LID: L17), also known as Taft-Kern County Airport, is a public airport located one mile (1.6 km) east of Taft, serving Kern County, California, USA. This general aviation airport covers 71 acres (29 ha) and has one runway. It is home to a skydive operation known as Skydive Taft.

Runway 07 is marked with a runway-width X. Landings on 07 are not allowed; landings on 25 are allowed, and takeoffs from 07 and 25 are allowed.

== See also ==
- List of airports in Kern County, California
