= Scania-Vabis L36 =

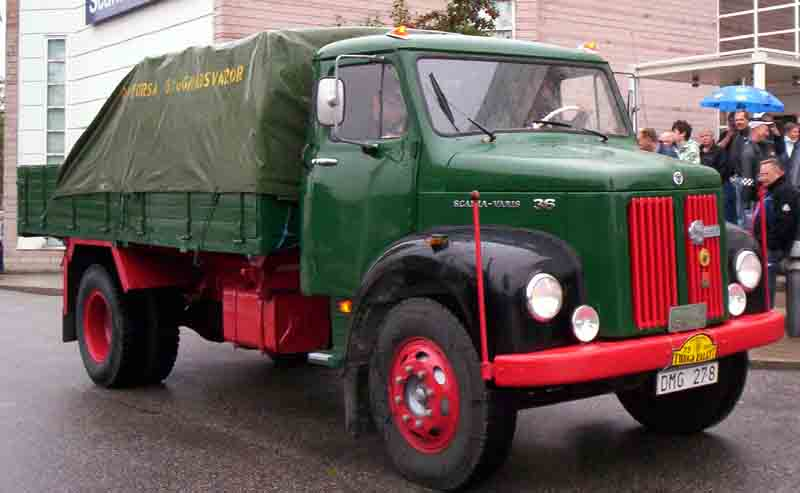

Overview
- Manufacturer: Scania-Vabis
- Production: 1964 - 1968, 3,507 produced

Body and chassis
- Class: Medium size truck

Powertrain
- Engine: Scania-Vabis ohv I4 diesel engine
- Transmission: 5 speed manual

Dimensions
- Wheelbase: 4.2 m (165.4 in) - 4.8 m (189.0 in)
- Curb weight: 10,500 kg (23,148.5 lb) - 11,200 kg (24,691.8 lb) (gross weight)

Chronology
- Predecessor: Scania-Vabis Drabant
- Successor: Scania L50

The Scania-Vabis L36 was a medium sized truck produced by Swedish automaker Scania-Vabis between 1964 and 1968.

== Scania-Vabis L36 ==
By the early 1960s, Scania-Vabis’ trucks had grown so large that they were no longer suitable for urban distribution duty. Therefore, in the autumn of 1964, the company introduced a smaller model called the L36. It had a four-cylinder engine, also available with a turbocharger. The compact engine design allowed for the cab to be mounted unusually far forward. The truck had a payload capacity of 5 to 6 tonnes and was equipped with dual circuit air brakes.

== Engines ==
| Model | Year | Engine | Displacement | Power | Type |
|---|---|---|---|---|---|
| L36 | 1964-68 | Scania-Vabis D5: I4 ohv | 5,193 cc (316.9 cu in) | 90 bhp (67 kW) | Diesel engine |
| L36 Super | 1964-68 | Scania-Vabis DS5: I4 ohv | 5,193 cc (316.9 cu in) | 120 bhp (89 kW) | Turbodiesel |
