= Weaverville Airport =

Weaverville Airport Lonnie Pool Field
- IATA: none; ICAO: none; FAA LID: O54

Summary
- Airport type: Public
- Operator: Trinity County
- Location: Weaverville, California
- Elevation AMSL: 2,350 ft / 716 m
- Coordinates: 40°44′45″N 122°55′19″W
- Interactive map of Weaverville Airport

Runways
Direction	Length		Surface
Direction	ft	m	Surface
18/36	3,181	970	Asphalt

Weaverville Airport (FAA LID: O54), also known as Lonnie Pool Field, is a public airport located one mile (1.6 km) northeast of Weaverville, serving Trinity County, California, United States. This general aviation airport covers 65 acres (26 ha) and has one runway.
