= Southard Promontory =

Coordinates: 66°56′S 64°50′W

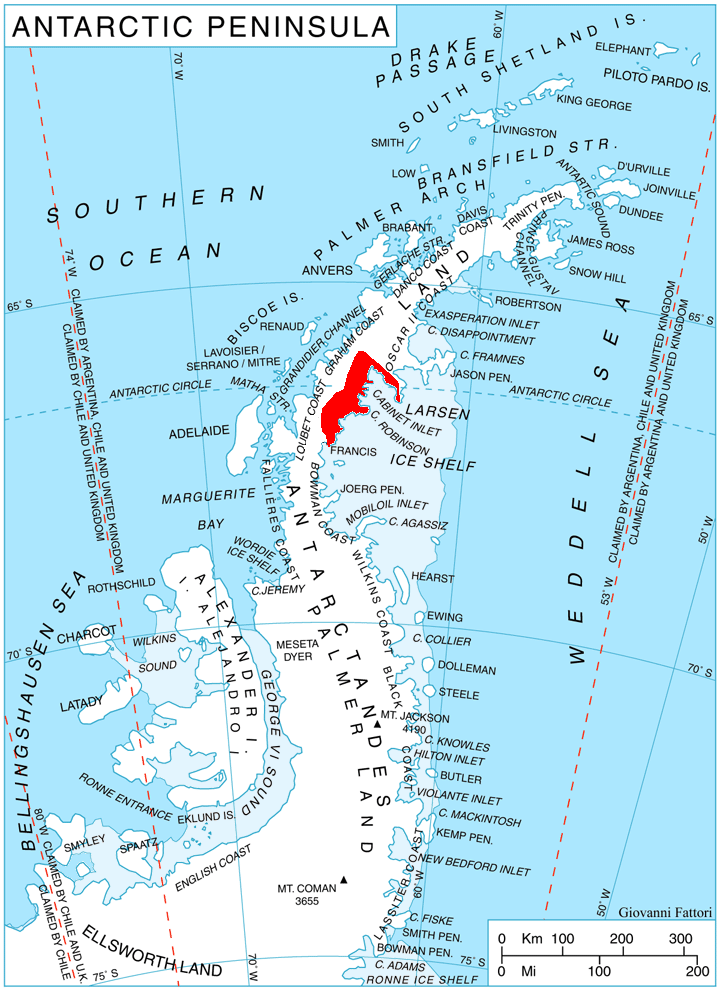
Location of Foyn Coast on Antarctic Peninsula

Southard Promontory is a notable promontory, 6 nautical miles (11 km; 6.9 mi) long and 2 nautical miles (3.7 km; 2.3 mi) wide, which juts into northwest Mill Inlet between Breitfuss Glacier and Alberts Glacier, on the Foyn Coast, Graham Land. The promontory is bordered by steep rock cliffs that rise 1,500 metres (4,900 ft) to a relatively flat and snow-covered upper surface. It was photographed from the air by Ronne Antarctic Research Expedition (RARE) and surveyed from the ground by Falkland Islands Dependencies Survey (FIDS) in 1947.

In association with the names of Antarctic cartographers grouped in this area, named by the United Kingdom Antarctic Place-Names Committee (UK-APC) after Rupert B. Southard, Jr., Chief, National Mapping Division, United States Geological Survey (USGS), 1979–86; Chief, Office of International Activities (with responsibility for USGS field parties working in Antarctica), 1961–64; U.S. Representative to the SCAR Working Group on Geodesy and Cartography, 1964–79; Chairman, Domestic Names Committee of the USBGN, 1983-87 (Chairman, USBGN, 1988–90).
