= Elk Hills-Buttonwillow Airport =

- IATA: none; ICAO: none; FAA LID: L62

Summary
- Operator: Kern County
- Location: Buttonwillow, California
- Elevation AMSL: 326 ft (99 m)
- Coordinates: 35°21′10″N 119°28′43″W
- Interactive map of Elk Hills-Buttonwillow Airport

Runways
Direction	Length		Surface
Direction	ft	m	Surface
11/29	3,260	994	Asphalt

Elk Hills-Buttonwillow Airport (FAA LID: L62) is a public airport located three miles (5 km) south of the central business district (CBD) of Buttonwillow, in Kern County, California, United States. It is mostly used for general aviation.

== Facilities ==
Elk Hills-Buttonwillow Airport covers 216 acres (0.87 km^{2}) and has one runway:

- Runway 11/29: 3,260 x 50 ft (994 x 15 m), surface: asphalt

== See also ==
- List of airports in Kern County, California
