= Woodlake Airport =

- IATA: none; ICAO: none; FAA LID: O42

Summary
- Airport type: Public
- Operator: City of Woodlake
- Location: Woodlake, California
- Elevation AMSL: 425 ft / 130 m
- Coordinates: 36°23′56″N 119°06′26″W
- Interactive map of Woodlake Airport

Runways
Direction	Length		Surface
Direction	ft	m	Surface
7/25	2,203	671	Asphalt/gravel

Woodlake Airport (FAA LID: O42) is a public airport located two miles (3.2 km) south of Woodlake, serving Tulare County, California, United States. This general aviation airport covers 88 acres (360,000 m^{2}) and has one runway.
