= Sierraville Dearwater Airport =

- IATA: none; ICAO: none; FAA LID: O79

Summary
- Airport type: Public
- Owner: County of Sierra
- Serves: Sierraville, California
- Elevation AMSL: 4,984 ft / 1,519 m
- Coordinates: 39°34′54″N 120°21′14″W
- Interactive map of Sierraville Dearwater Airport

Runways
Direction	Length		Surface
Direction	ft	m	Surface
3/21	3,260	994	Asphalt

Statistics (2010)
- Aircraft operations: 1,000
- Source: Federal Aviation Administration

Sierraville Dearwater Airport (FAA LID: O79) is a county-owned public-use airport located one nautical mile (2 km) southeast of the central business district of Sierraville, in Sierra County, California, United States.

== Facilities and aircraft ==
Sierraville Dearwater Airport covers an area of 28 acres (11 ha) at an elevation of 4,984 feet (1,519 m) above mean sea level. It has one runway designated 3/21 with an asphalt surface measuring 3,260 by 50 feet (994 x 15 m). For the 12-month period ending May 31, 2010, the airport had 1,000 general aviation aircraft operations, an average of 83 per month.
