= California Pines Airport =

- IATA: none; ICAO: none; FAA LID: A24

Summary
- Serves: Alturas
- Location: California
- Coordinates: 41°24′43″N 120°41′06″W
- Interactive map of California Pines Airport

California Pines Airport (FAA LID: A24) is a small airport in Alturas, California. The airport is served by a single asphalt runway.
