= T. J. Southard =

American shipbuilder, businessman and politician

Thomas Jefferson Southard
- Born: Thomas Jefferson Southard; June 18, 1808; Townsend, Maine, U.S.
- Died: September 20, 1896 (aged 88); Richmond, Maine, U.S.
- Occupation: Shipbuilder
- Spouse(s): Jane Jones, née Springer
- Children: 8

Thomas Jefferson Southard (June 18, 1808 – September 20, 1896) was an American shipbuilder, ship owner, entrepreneur, politician and philanthropist, who is considered one of the founding fathers of Richmond, Maine. Southard rose from humble origins to found T. J. Southard & Co., later known as T. J. Southard & Son, the largest shipyard in Richmond in its day and one of the most productive in the state, turning out between 75 and 100 wooden-hulled sailing ships over the course of about 44 years, including some of the largest and best known Maine-built ships of the era. Southard retained a majority share in many of the ships he built, thus building and controlling his own merchant fleet.

Southard was a leading property developer in his home town, and owned, founded or helped establish many businesses there, as well as encouraging infrastructure projects. He was Richmond's first postmaster, and served in the Maine Legislature both as a representative and senator.

== Life and career ==
=== Early life ===
Southard was born in Townsend, Maine on May 18, 1808. In 1819, at the age of eleven, intent on becoming a sailor, Southard hiked across to Richmond, Maine (then known as White's Landing), where he was hired by Captain Solomon Blanchard. For the next year, Southard worked aboard coastal vessels as a ship's boy and cook, but finding this line of work disagreeable, he secured instead a position as a blacksmith's apprentice at Richmond.

After completing his apprenticeship, Southard set up his own forge on the Kennebec River, where he did a lucrative trade as a shipsmith, often taking payment in shares of the ships he serviced. His forge burned down in its first year of operation, but the locals, appreciative of his skills, helped him rebuild. While plying his trade, Southard also continued his education, studying draftsmanship and ship construction, until he had accumulated enough wealth and knowledge to open his own shipyard. (Note: According to HABS document ME-149, Southard "spent a year learning the trade of ship joiner and six months studying drafting.")

=== Shipbuilding and merchant fleet ===
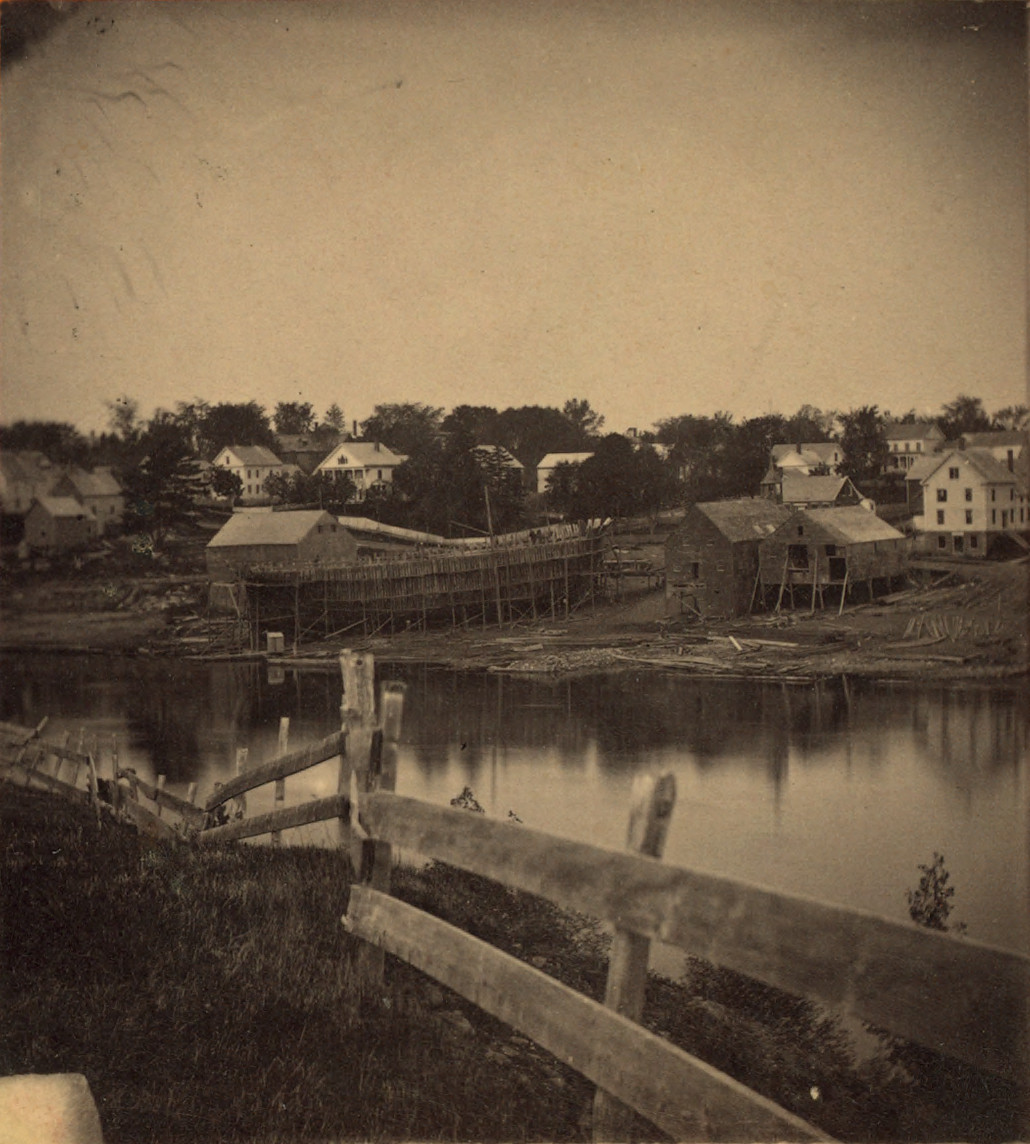
An unidentified shipyard at Richmond, Maine, ca. 1870s

Southard built his first ship—a schooner named Texas—before the age of 29 (in about 1837). He then designed a series of small "coasters" intended for the Southern coastal trade, with names such as Savannah, Richmond and Wilmington. According to Little's Genealogy, Southard then formed a partnership with a talented young shipbuilder named Stanwood Alexander; the two of them building sixteen ships together from 1845 until Alexander's death in 1852. Southard then continued as a sole trader, operating the business under the name T. J. Southard & Co..

In 1865, Southard's son Charles H. T. J. Southard became a partner in the firm, after which it usually traded as T. J. Southard & Son, although at least two ships were constructed under the name of T. J. & C. H. Southard. According to his own testimony, Charles' main role in the firm was bookkeeping, although he is also later said to have assisted in the management of his father's merchant fleet.

Over the course of some 44 years, the Southard shipyard built between 75 and 100 wooden-hulled sailing ships of all kinds, large and small, including schooners, barks, brigs and full-rigged ships, his vessels having "an industry-wide reputation for reliability of workmanship and trimness of line." T. J. Southard owned shares in many of the ships he built, and was the first local shipbuilder to own 100% of a ship (the ship's captain in this era usually being obliged to own at least one-sixteenth of his command). By these means, Southard became not only a shipbuilder but the head of his own merchant fleet, his ships flying the Southard house flag with a design incorporating an anvil—a pictorial reference to the proprietor's smithing origins.

==== Notable ships ====
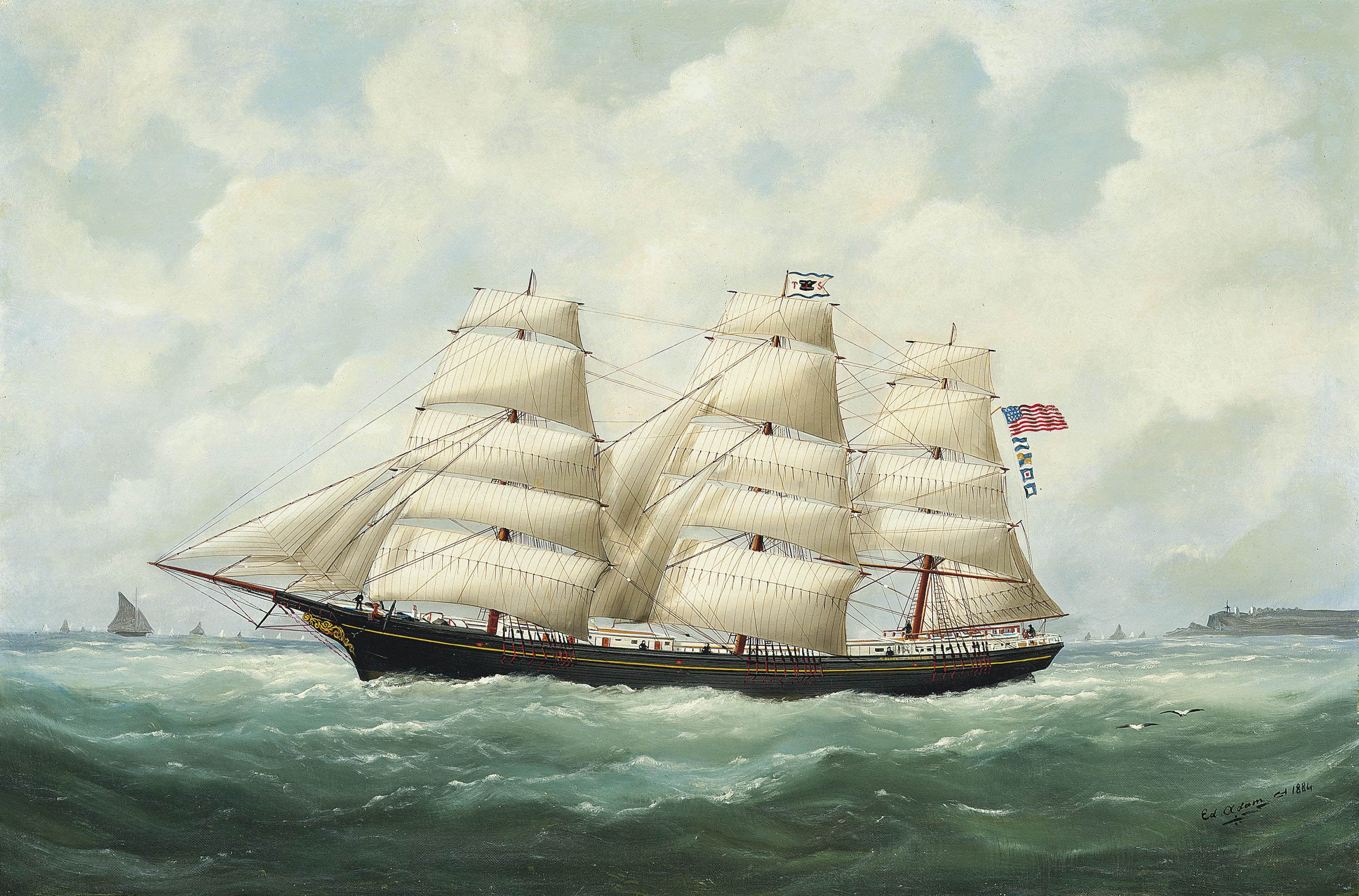
The full-rigged ship Olive S. Southard, built by T. J. Southard in 1871

An early vessel of note built by Southard was Buena Vista, a 660-ton vessel built in 1848 which, though not a clipper, had a reputation for speed, sometimes clocking passages comparable with clippers and once making a "splendid passage" of 60 days from San Francisco to Calcutta. In 1853, Southard built the 1,854-ton ship Gauntlet, which for many years retained the distinction of being the largest ship ever built in Maine. Sold to the British in 1860 and renamed Sunda, the vessel under Captain "Bully" Bragg subsequently made a number of very fast passages, including a record 76-day passage from London to Brisbane. In 1854, Southard built the 1,400-ton Wizard King, which "established for itself a fine record in Australian service." Both Gauntlet and Wizard King were classified as clippers and are usually referred to as such, but according to Fairburn, were no more than "half-clippers" at best.

Some of the largest vessels built at the Southard yard, constructed between 1875 and 1879, were the full-rigged ships Charles Dennis—"a good-looking and loftily-spired ship" of 1,710 tons; Eureka (2,101 tons); Red Cross (1,300 tons) and Theodore H. Allen (1,537 tons). Of these, Eureka in particular was an "outstanding" ship: the largest Maine-built vessel at time of construction, she later made several fast passages around Cape Horn or across the Atlantic. The largest vessel built by Southard—and apparently the largest ever built in the state north of Bath—was Commodore T. H. Allen, a vessel of 2,390 tons and 245 feet in length, built in 1884, which is also known to have recorded some respectable times. According to the Southard family itself, the last vessel built by the Southards was a four-masted schooner named Edith L. Allen, completed in 1890.

One of Southard's ships, Ellen Southard, is best known for the manner of her demise, as it led to a change in U.S. law. The vessel was wrecked in 1875 with the loss of nine lives in a gale near the mouth of the Mersey River, Liverpool. The courage of British lifesavers attempting a rescue prompted the United States Congress to alter the statute covering Lifesaving Medals to allow them to be awarded for the first time to non-Americans. A total of 27 Lifesaving Medals were awarded over the Ellen Southard disaster.

=== Other activities ===
In addition to his shipbuilding company and merchant fleet, T. J. Southard was a major contributor in numerous other ways to the economic and social development of his home town of Richmond and the surrounding locale. He founded the Southard Cotton Mill, as well as a mineral spring business that sold its product nationally. He owned numerous businesses collectively employing hundreds of people, including four shipyards, a brass foundry, grist mill, saw and planing mill, furniture factory, sail loft, bakery, edged tool store, drugstore and dry goods and West Indies goods store, the latter alone turning over $50,000 annually in 1840s dollars. Additionally, he worked to bring other businesses and business infrastructure to Richmond, including shoe factories, a bag mill, the telegraph and railroad. He is credited with establishing several business blocks in Richmond along with some fifty houses, and he owned and rented farmland in the locality. It was said of him that there was scarcely an "institution in town he hasn't a corner in."

Notable buildings constructed or commissioned by Southard include the Southard Cotton Mill; his own residence, in Italianate style; his son's residence—a wedding gift that today serves as the C. H. T. J. Southard Museum; and the T. J. Southard Bank and Counting House, later known as Southard Block. The latter building, designed by T. J. Southard himself and featuring a cast iron facade transported from Boston, was added to the National Register of Historic Places in the 1970s.

During the course of his career, Southard served his region in many different capacities. He was Richmond's first postmaster, and later became an "active director" on the boards of several New England railroad and telegraph companies, towage corporations, banks and other institutions, such as the Portland and Kennebec Railroad, International Telegraph Company, and the State Bank and First National Bank, as well as being a longstanding president of the Sagadahoc Agricultural and Horticultural Society. He also served his state as a politician, firstly as a member of the Maine House of Representatives, in 1853, and later as a state senator in 1865-66. Southard was a Douglas Democrat before the American Civil War, but later became a supporter of President Abraham Lincoln.

During the Civil War, Southard and a business associate, Cornelius Vanderbilt, were accused of endangering the lives of Union soldiers by selling the government unseaworthy ships at inflated prices for the 1862 Banks expedition to New Orleans. Southard was also accused of charging an illegal 5% commission on the sales. Southard was eventually censured by Congress for his role in the scandal, but Vanderbilt escaped censure, reportedly due to his political influence.

Southard was a philanthropist, known for his generous donations to newly established schools and churches, "regardless of denomination".

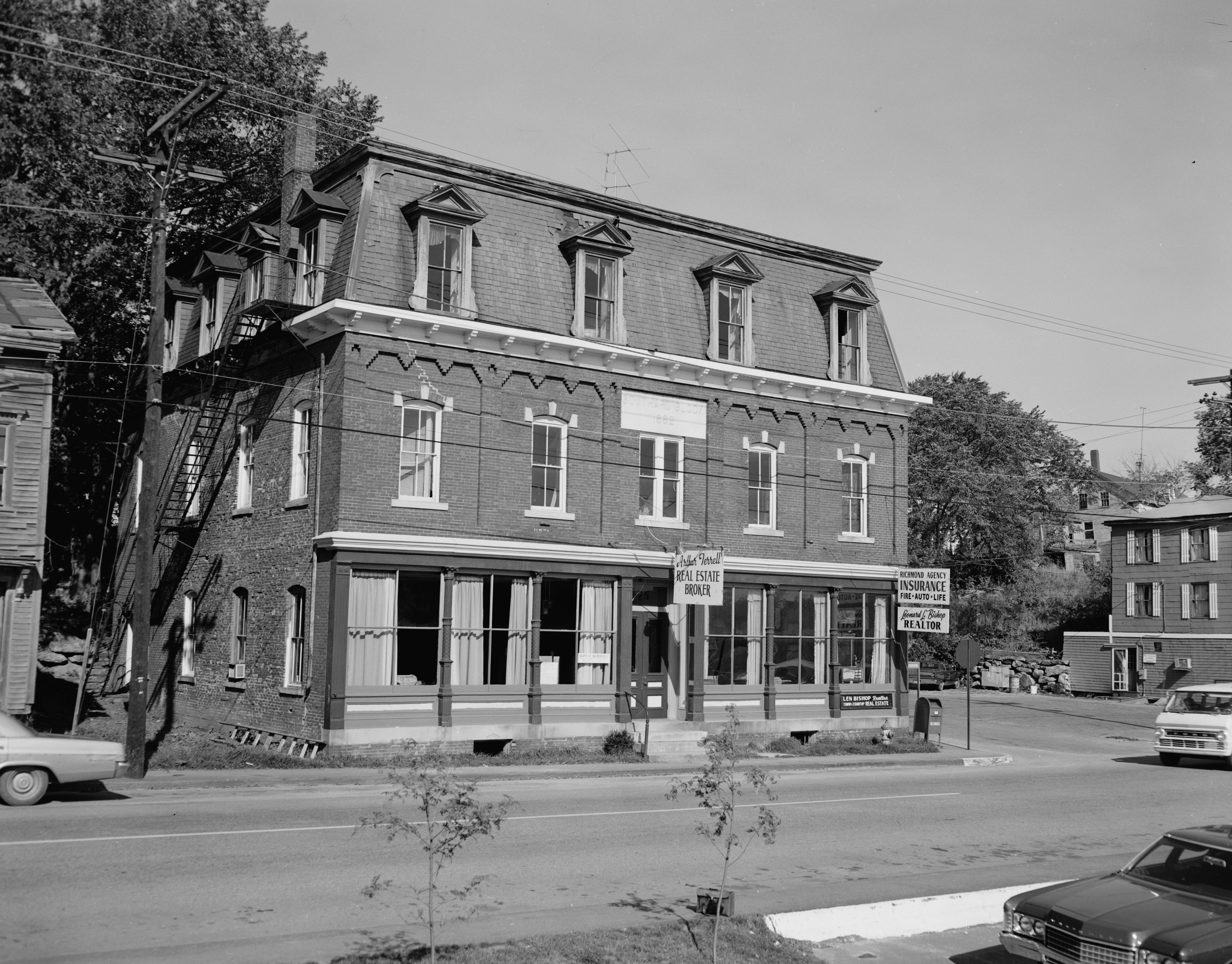
Southard Block, designed by T. J. Southard and added to the National Register of Historic Places in the 1970s

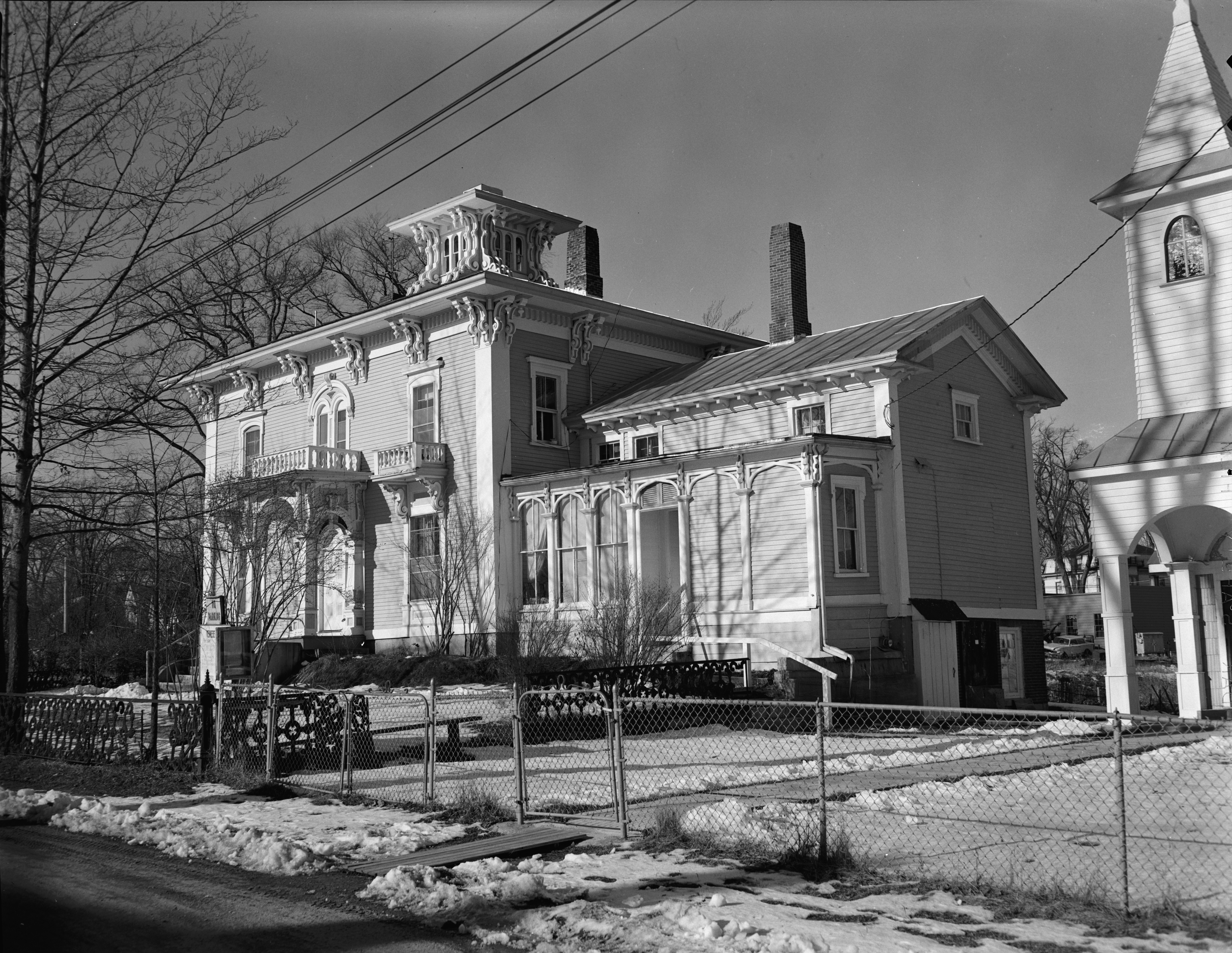
Southard's house, built ca. 1855 in Italianate style

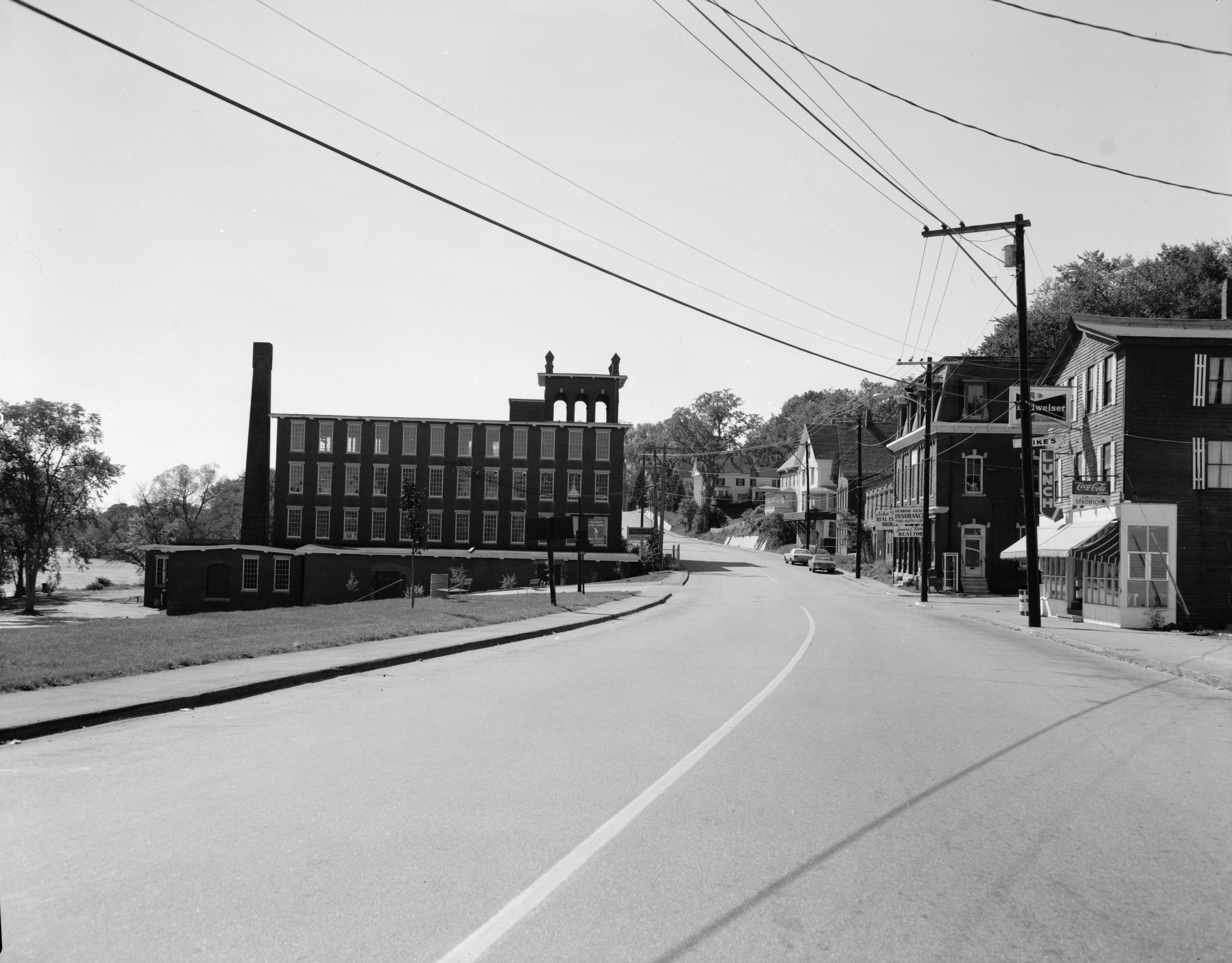
Southard Mill

=== Personal life ===
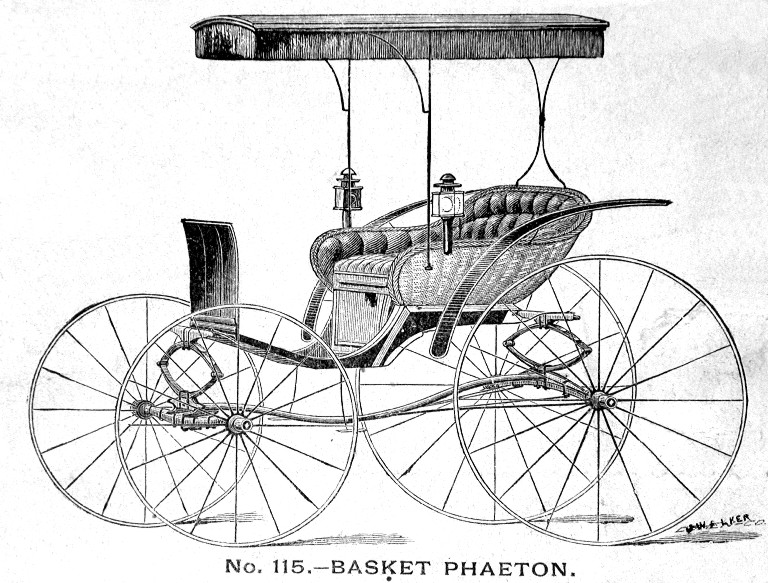
A "fast and dangerous" basket phaeton, the type of vehicle favored by Southard in later life

At the age of 23, Southard married Jane Jones Springer, an "amiable and intelligent" woman two years his junior; it would be a lifelong partnership. The couple had eight, possibly nine, (Note: The source states that the couple probably had "one other child of whom there is no record.") children together, including a son, Charles, and seven daughters: Ellen J. (died in infancy), Caroline G., Harriet Frances (married name Hussey), Mary Elizabeth (Merrill), Ellen Jane (Stoutenburg), Florianna M. (Hulbert) and Delia Davis (Tallman). T. J. is said to have "never fully recovered" from the loss of his daughter Delia, who was aboard the Southard ship G. W. Morton, commanded by her husband Horatio, when it disappeared without trace on an 1854 voyage. Southard later had the entrance to his new Italianate home painted with scenes from Delia's life.

Sources differ as to Southard's personality. To some, he was a "charming conversationalist" who was fond of a good joke and who enjoyed recounting tales of his rags-to-riches life. To others, he was "garrulous and a perfectionist": it has been said of him that he was by no means "universally well liked". He had a reputation as a tough business negotiator, and has been described as a workaholic, not averse to staying up all night in the pursuit of his business goals.

The Southards participated in the social life of Richmond, T. J. and his wife sometimes hosting whist parties or dances, the latter usually featuring the Virginia reel, at their Richmond home. A wide cross-section of the community was represented at these events.

Southard remained fit and active well into his seniority; anecdotes abound of him performing feats of athleticism in his 70s. Late in life, his preferred mode of personal transport was a basket phaeton—a type of horse-drawn carriage with a reputation for being fast and dangerous. Southard was a Freemason, a member of the Knights of Pythias and of the Independent Order of Odd Fellows. He died at Richmond, Maine, aged 88, on September 15, 1896, his wife Jane surviving him by barely a month. Their son Charles closed the Southard family shipyard not long after in 1899.

T. J. and his wife Jane had few grandchildren, but a grandson by their son Charles, named Thomas Jefferson Southard after his grandfather, achieved a degree of prominence in the fields of banking and insurance. A granddaughter, Hattie Bishop Hussey, married New York stock speculator Charles W. Morse.

== List of ships ==
Southard is credited with building between 75 and 100 ships in the course of his career, including those listed here.

Ships built by T. J. Southard, date unknown
| Name | Built | Type | Ton. | Len. | Beam | Hold depth | Notes |
|---|---|---|---|---|---|---|---|
| Texas | <1838 | "Coaster" | 122 | | | | First vessel built by Southard, completed before his 29th birthday. For the Southern coastal trade |
| Savannah | | Bark | | | | | For the Southern coastal trade |
| Richmond | | "Coaster" | | | | | Designed and possibly built by Southard. For the Southern coastal trade |
| Wilmington | | "Coaster" | | | | | Designed and possibly built by Southard. For the Southern coastal trade |

Ships built by T. J. Southard & Co. or T. J. Southard & Son, 1846–1890 (Note: Fairburn lists three vessels named Sewall, Harriet and Francis and R. K. Page; these are assumed to be the vessels listed by Little as B. Sewall, Harriet Frances and B. K. Page respectively. Fairburn makes no mention of Stanwood Alexander at all.)
| Name | Built | Type | Ton. | Len. | Beam | Hold depth | Notes |
|---|---|---|---|---|---|---|---|
| Croton | 1846 | Schooner | 148 | 87.7 | 23.4 | 8.2 | |
| Josephine | 1846 | Brig | | | | | |
| Alice Frazier | 1847 | Bark | | | | | |
| John Murray | 1847 | Bark | | | | | |
| Masonic | 1847 | Ship | | | | | |
| Medallion | 1847 | Ship | 547 | 136.2 | 29.7 | 14.8 | Baltimore—Liverpool packet, Corner Line, 1860 |
| Sea Bird | 1847 | Brig | | | | | |
| Buena Vista | 1848 | Ship | 661 | 142.4 | 31.9 | 16 | Fast ship, made "splendid passage" of 60 days from San Francisco to Calcutta in 1851 |
| T. J. Southard | 1848 | Bark | | | | | |
| Hampton | 1849 | Ship | | | | | |
| Forest Queen | 1849 | Ship | 885 | 158.4 | 35 | 17.5 | |
| Bennington | 1850 | Ship | 513 | 132.2 | 29.2 | 14.6 | |
| Delia Maria | 1850 | Ship | 583 | 138.3 | 30.4 | 15.2 | Driven ashore by gale and wrecked at Charleston, South Carolina, 1854 |
| Washington | 1850 | Ship | | | | | |
| B. Sewall | 1851 | Ship | 597 | 142.2 | 30.2 | 15.1 | Baltimore—Liverpool packet, Corner Line, 1852 |
| Lucy W. Hale | 1851 | Ship | 648 | | | | Baltimore—Liverpool packet, Corner Line, 1852 |
| Arctic | 1851 | Ship | | | | | |
| Harriet Frances | 1851 | Bark | 454 | | | | Baltimore—Liverpool packet, Corner Line, 1855 |
| B. K. Page | 1852 | Ship | 995 | 167.5 | 36 | 18 | |
| Moro Castle | 1852 | Ship | | | | | |
| Gauntlet; Sunda 60 | 1853 | Clipper (Note: Classified as a clipper but better described as a "half clipper" according to Fairburn.) | 1,854 (Note: Another source gives the tonnage of this vessel as 2,031 tons.) | 240 | 42.4 | 21.2 | Held record for many years as largest ship built in Maine. Sold to British 1860, record 76-day passage London–Brisbane 1863, destroyed by fire 1878 |
| Phaeton | 1853 | Ship | 1,113 | 187 | 35.7 | 17.9 | |
| Linda | 1853 | Ship | 1,077 | 182.3 | 35.7 | 17.8 | |
| Lorenzo | 1853 | Ship | 1,093 | | | | |
| William Libby | 1853 | Ship | 999 | 171 | 35 | 24 | |
| Vulcan | 1854 | Schooner | 158 | 84.4 | 25.8 | 9 | |
| Wizard King | 1854 | Clipper | 1,398 | 199.5 | 38.8 | 23.5 | "[F]ine record in Australian service" |
| Charlotte A. Stamler | 1854 | Ship | 999 | | | | A "first-class ship ... intended for the general freighting business." |
| Flora Southard | 1855 | Ship | 524 | 134 | 28 | 22 | |
| Lizzie Southard | 1857 | Ship | 1,041 | 185.3 | 34.7 | 17.5 | |
| H. E. Spearing | 1857 | Schooner | 224 | 110.1 | 25 | 8.7 | |
| Southern Rights | 1859 | Ship | 830 | 170 | 32 | 23 | |
| Northern Rights | 18?? | Ship | | | | | |
| C. H. Smith | 1860 | Ship | 800 | | | | |
| C. H. Southard | 1860 | Bark | 625 | 146 | 30 | 22 | |
| Equal Rights | 1861 | Ship | | | | | Built at Black Rock, Connecticut |
| T. J. Southard | 1862 | Ship | 1,081 | 187.2 | 35.2 | 17.7 | |
| Ellen Southard | 1863 | Ship | 828 | 159 | 33 | 23 | Wrecked at Liverpool in 1875 |
| Tommie Hussey | 1864 | Bark | 564 | 136.4 | 30.1 | 15 | |
| Jane J. Southard | 1864 | Ship | 1,120 | 184.5 | 36.2 | 18 | |
| R. E. Pecker | 1864 | Schooner | | | | | Captured and bonded for $10,000 by Confederate raider Tallahassee, 1864 |
| B. Sewall | 1865 | Bark | 813 | 147.4 | 34.5 | 13.7 | |
| Mary C. Rosevelt | 1865 | Brig | 235 | 117.2 | 29.4 | 9.6 | |
| Pomona | 1866 | Brig | 421 | 125.5 | 31 | 15.4 | |
| Lizzie M. Merrill | 1866 | Brig | 458 | 131.4 | 31 | 15.7 | |
| C. H. Southard | 1867 | Ship | 1,099 | 174 | 38.2 | 23.4 | |
| Harriet F. Hussey | 1868 | Bark | 684 | 141.2 | 31.6 | 20.7 | |
| Moses Day | 1868 | Ship | 1,271 | 187.2 | 38.2 | 24 | |
| Vesuvius | 1869 | Bark | 812 | 160.7 | 32.5 | 21.1 | |
| Olive S. Southard | 1871 | Ship | 1,193 | 186.2 | 37.1 | 24.2 | |
| T. Jeffie Southard | 1873 | Bark | 830 | 161.7 | 36.4 | 18.6 | |
| Charles Dennis | 1873 | Brig | 392 | 138.4 | 31 | 11.7 | |
| Charles Dennis | 1875 | Ship | 1,710 | 215.6 | 39.7 | 24.7 | |
| Eureka | 1876 | Ship | 2,101 | 230.7 | 42.1 | 17.7 | "[F]irst class ship" costing $100,000; largest Maine-built ship at time of construction. Coal barge, 1899, sank about 1902 |
| Red Cross | 1877 | Ship | 1,300 | 185.2 | 38.1 | 23.1 | Driven ashore and wrecked by hurricane, 1889 |
| Theodore H. Allen | 1879 | Ship | 1,537 | 208.7 | 39.2 | 20 | |
| Jennie Hulbert | 1880 | Brig | 440 | 143.6 | 32.5 | 12.2 | |
| C. Southard Hulbert | 1881 | Bark | 1,079 | 178.5 | 35.6 | 21.2 | |
| H. B. Hussey | 1883 | Brig | 545 | 160.4 | 36.2 | 12.2 | Hermaphrodite brig. Abandoned at sea during blizzard, 1899. |
| Commodore T. H. Allen | 1884 | Ship | 2,390 | 245.2 | 41.6 | 19.7 | Reportedly the largest Maine ship ever built north of Bath. Converted to coal barge after fire, 1901; sank 1912 |
| Conecuh | 1885 | Schooner | 822 | 175 | 36.5 | 17.7 | |
| Edith L. Allen | 1890 | Schooner | 969 | 185 | 39.1 | 18.4 | Four-masted schooner |
