= Rio Linda Airport =

Public-use airport in Rio Linda, California

- IATA: none; ICAO: none; FAA LID: L36

Summary
- Airport type: Public
- Owner: William T. Mauser
- Serves: Rio Linda, California
- Location: Rio Linda, California
- Elevation AMSL: 46 ft / 14 m
- Coordinates: 38°40′30″N 121°26′44″W
- Interactive map of Rio Linda Airport

Runways
| Direction | Length | | Surface |
| Direction | ft | m | Surface |
|---|---|---|---|
| 17/35 | 2,625 | 800 | Asphalt |

Statistics (2023)
- Aircraft operations (year ending 10/31/2023): 20,000
- Based aircraft: 139
- Source: Federal Aviation Administration

Rio Linda Airport (FAA LID: L36) is a public-use airport located one mile (1.6 km) south of Rio Linda, in Sacramento County, California, United States.

Although most U.S. airports use the same three-letter location identifier for the FAA and IATA, Rio Linda Airport is assigned L36 by the FAA but has no designation from the IATA.

The airport is 7 nautical miles east of Sacramento International Airport and two nautical miles west of McClellan Airport.

== Facilities and aircraft ==
Rio Linda Airport covers an area of 40 acres (16 ha) which contains one asphalt paved runway designated as 17/35 and measuring 2,625 x 42 ft (800 x 13 m).

There is a fixed-base operator on the field offering fuel and parking services as well as a lounge, restrooms, and a weather briefing station.

For the 12-month period ending October 31, 2023, the airport had 20,000 aircraft operations, an average of 55 per day. All of it was general aviation. For the same time period, there were 139 aircraft based on the field: 136 single-engine and 3 multi-engine airplanes.
