= Ruth Airport =

- IATA: none; ICAO: none; FAA LID: T42

Summary
- Airport type: Public
- Operator: Trinity County
- Location: Ruth, California
- Elevation AMSL: 2,781 ft / 847.6 m
- Coordinates: 40°12′41″N 123°17′51″W
- Interactive map of Ruth Airport

Runways
Direction	Length		Surface
Direction	ft	m	Surface
13/31	3,500	1,067	Asphalt

Ruth Airport (FAA LID: T42) (formerly Q95) is a public airport located seven miles (11 km) south of Ruth, serving Trinity County, California, USA. This general aviation airport covers 60 acres and has one runway.
