= California City Municipal Airport =

Airport in the United States

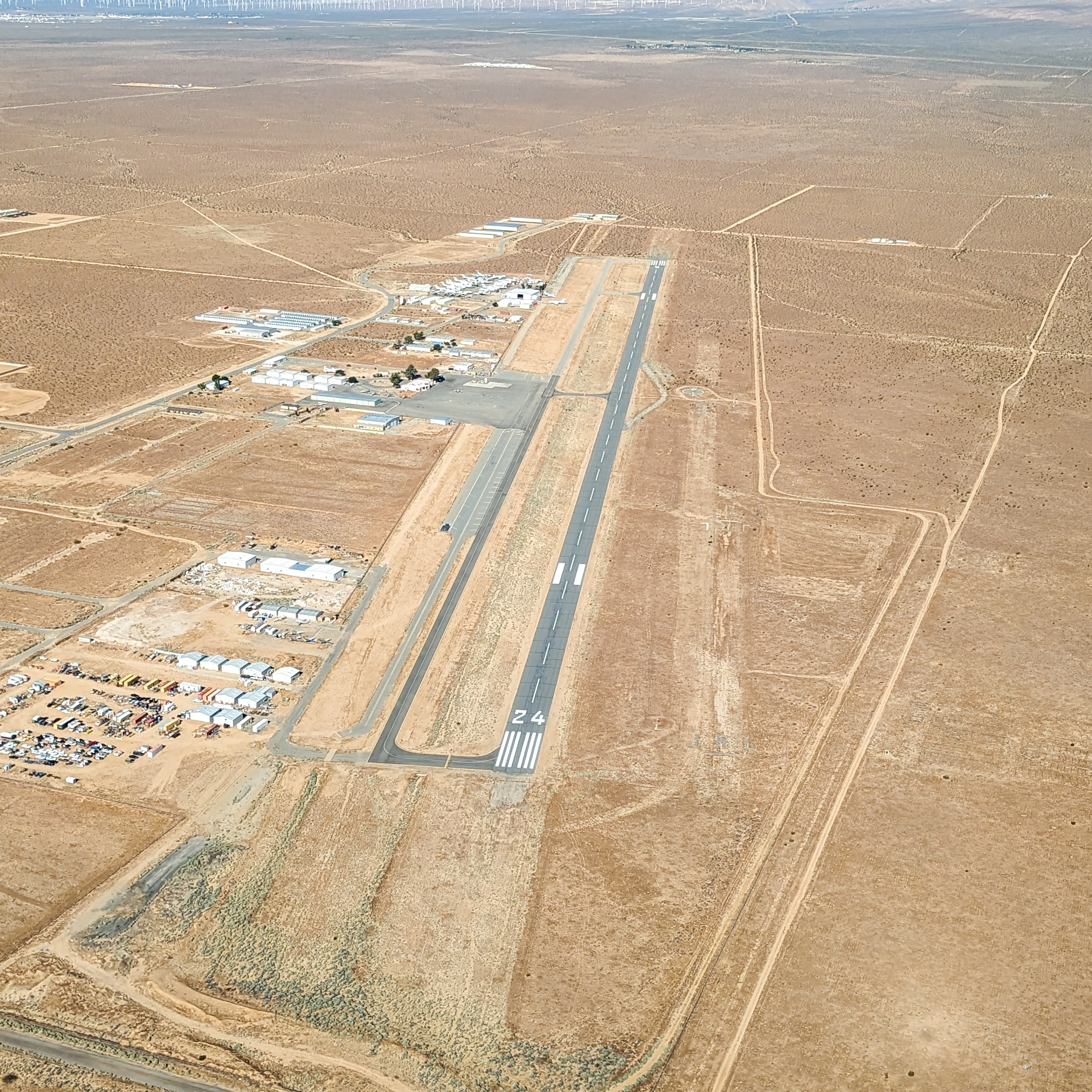
- California City Municipal Airport aerial view
- IATA: none; ICAO: none; FAA LID: L71

Summary
- Airport type: Public
- Owner: City of California City
- Operator: California City, California
- Elevation AMSL: 2,454 ft (748 m)
- Coordinates: 35°09′04″N 118°01′00″W
- Interactive map of California City Municipal Airport

Runways
Direction	Length		Surface
Direction	ft	m	Surface
06/24	6,027	1,837	Asphalt

California City Municipal Airport (FAA LID: L71) is located in the city of California City, in the Fremont Valley of Kern County, California.

== Facilities ==
California City Municipal Airport diagram

The airport covers 245 acres (99 ha); its single runway, 06/24, is 6,027 by 60 feet (1,837 by 18 m) long and covered by asphalt.

== See also ==
- List of airports in Kern County, California
- California City
