= Happy Camp Airport =

- IATA: none; ICAO: none; FAA LID: 36S

Summary
- Airport type: Public
- Owner: US Forest Service
- Operator: Siskiyou County
- Location: Happy Camp, CA; Klamath National Forest
- Opened: October 1951
- Elevation AMSL: 1,209 ft / 369 m
- Coordinates: 41°47′26.446″N 123°23′20.20″W
- Interactive map of Happy Camp Airport

Runways
Direction	Length		Surface
Direction	ft	m	Surface
4/22	3,000	914	Asphalt

Happy Camp Airport (FAA LID: 36S) is a public airport located in the city of Happy Camp, serving Siskiyou County, California, United States. It has one runway and is mostly used for general aviation.

== Facilities ==
Happy Camp Airport has one runway:

- Runway 4/22: 3,000 x 50 ft (914 x 15 m), surface: asphalt
