= Southard Field =

Airport in California, United States

Coordinates: 41°08′22″N 121°07′26″W

Southard Field Airport (FAA LID: O55) is a small airport located about 2 miles from Bieber, Lassen County, California. The airport is owned by Lassen County and is served by a single 2980 ft asphalt runway.
