= Pixley Airport =

Pixley Airport (Harmon Field)
- IATA: none; ICAO: none; FAA LID: P27

Summary
- Airport type: Public
- Owner: County of Tulare
- Serves: Pixley, California
- Elevation AMSL: 256 ft / 78 m
- Coordinates: 35°57′37″N 119°18′30″W
- Interactive map of Pixley Airport

Runways
Direction	Length		Surface
Direction	ft	m	Surface
13/31	2,050	625	Asphalt

Statistics (1993)
- Aircraft operations: 8,400
- Based aircraft: 7
- Source: Federal Aviation Administration

Pixley Airport (FAA LID: P27, formerly Q90), also known as Harmon Field, was a county-owned public-use airport located in Tulare County, California, United States, one nautical mile (2 km) southwest of the central business district of Pixley, California.

The airport opened in 1949. It was vacated and closed in early 1994 due to pesticide contamination from its years as a base for crop dusting.

Pixley airport's FAA location identifier was Q90 until 2003, when it was changed to P27. It remained in published FAA records until 2008, when it was listed as "public use" and noted as "closed indefinitely".

== Facilities and aircraft ==
Pixley Airport covered an area of 99 acres (40 ha) at an elevation of 256 feet (78 m) above mean sea level. It has one runway designated 13/31 with an asphalt surface measuring 2,050 by 60 feet (625 x 18 m).

For the 12-month period ending July 20, 1993, the airport had 8,400 general aviation aircraft operations, an average of 23 per day. At that time, there were 7 aircraft based at this airport: 86% single-engine and 14% multi-engine.
