= Rancho Murieta Airport =

- IATA: none; ICAO: KRIU; FAA LID: RIU

Summary
- Airport type: Public
- Owner: Rancho Murieta Airport Inc.
- Location: Rancho Murieta, California
- Elevation AMSL: 141 ft (43 m)
- Coordinates: 38°29′12″N 121°06′10″W
- Interactive map of Rancho Murieta Airport

Runways
Direction	Length		Surface
Direction	ft	m	Surface
4/22	3,800	1,158	Asphalt

Statistics (2002)
- Aircraft operations: 27,500
- Based aircraft: 64
- Source: Federal Aviation Administration

Rancho Murieta Airport (ICAO: KRIU, FAA LID: RIU) is a public-use airport located one mile (1.6 km) west of the central business district of Rancho Murieta, in Sacramento County, California, United States. It is privately owned by Rancho Murieta Airport Inc.

Although most U.S. airports use the same three-letter location identifier for the FAA and IATA, Rancho Murieta Airport is assigned RIU by the FAA but has no designation from the IATA.

== Facilities and aircraft ==
Rancho Murieta Airport covers an area of 76 acres (31 ha) which contains one asphalt paved runway (4/22) measuring 3,800 x 75 ft (1,158 x 23 m).

For the 12-month period ending December 31, 2002, the airport had 27,500 aircraft operations, an average of 75 per day: 96% general aviation and 4% air taxi. There are 64 aircraft based at this airport: 80% single engine, 8% multi-engine, 11% helicopters, and 2% ultralight.

== Ground Transportation ==
The Amador Transit 1 bus provides weekday connections to/from Downtown Sacramento. The fare is $4.
