= Round Valley Airport =

- IATA: none; ICAO: none; FAA LID: O09

Summary
- Airport type: Public
- Operator: Mendocino County
- Location: Covelo, California
- Elevation AMSL: 1,434 ft / 437.1 m
- Coordinates: 39°47′25″N 123°15′59″W
- Interactive map of Round Valley Airport

Runways
| Direction | Length | | Surface |
| Direction | ft | m | Surface |
|---|---|---|---|
| 10/28 | 3,670 | 1,119 | Asphalt |

Round Valley Airport (FAA LID: O09) is a public airport located one mile (1.6 km) southwest of Covelo, serving Mendocino County, California, USA. The airport is mostly used for general aviation. It was the site of a fatal crash in October 2023 after "the pilot’s decision to take off toward rising terrain".

== Facilities ==
Round Valley Airport covers 110 acres (45 ha) and has one asphalt paved runway (10/28) measuring 3,670 x 55 ft. (1,119 x 17 m).
