= Bakersfield Municipal Airport =

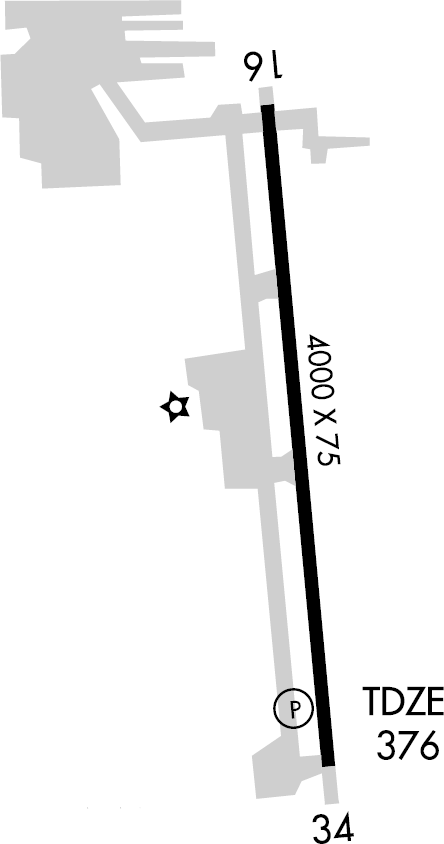
- IATA: none; ICAO: none; FAA LID: L45

Summary
- Airport type: Public
- Owner: City of Bakersfield
- Serves: Bakersfield, California
- Elevation AMSL: 378 ft (115 m)
- Coordinates: 35°19′30″N 118°59′46″W

Map
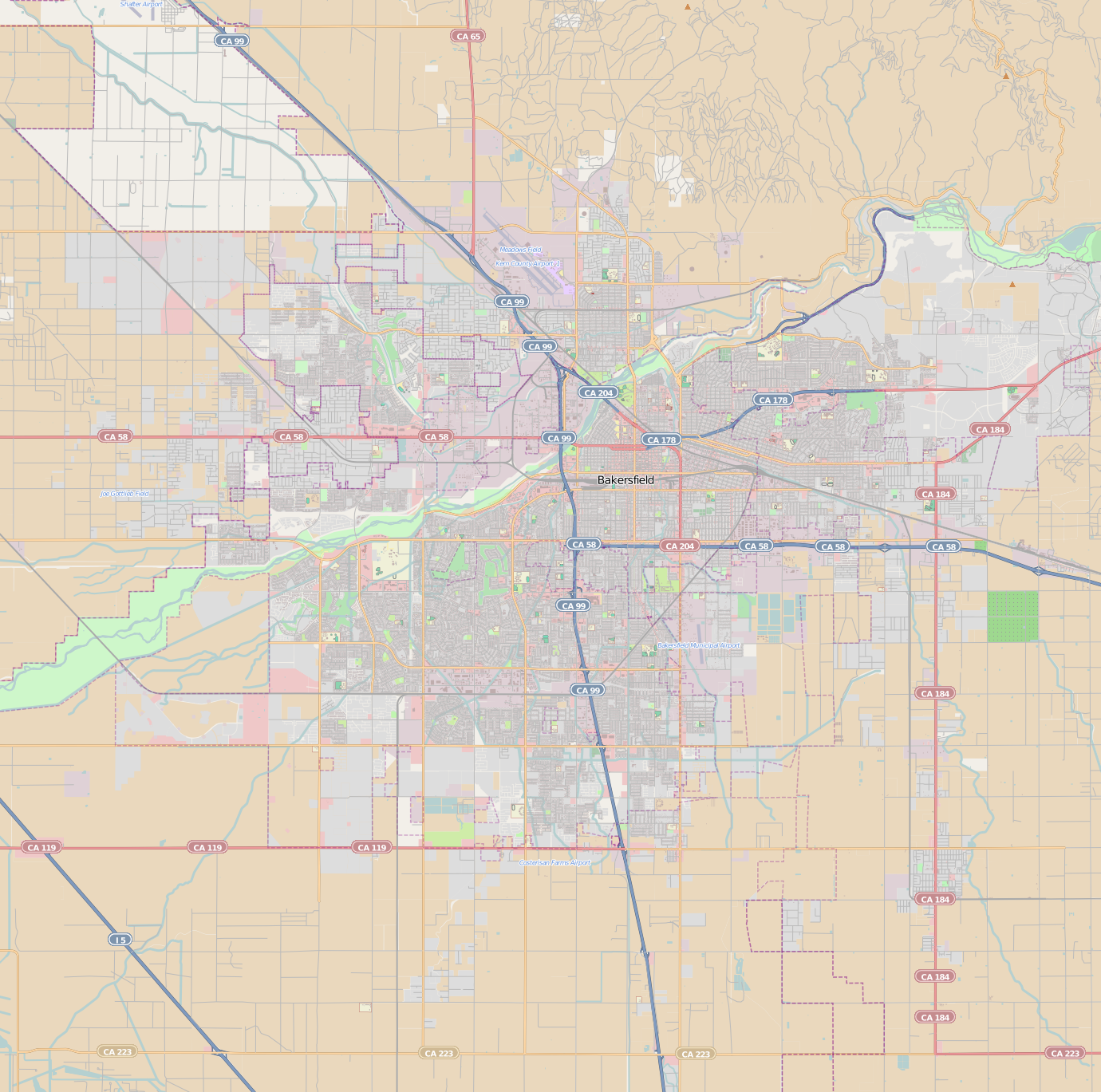
- Location of airport within Bakersfield L45 (California)

Runways
Direction	Length		Surface
Direction	ft	m	Surface
16/34	4,000	1,219	Asphalt

Statistics (2011)
- Aircraft operations: 25,000
- Based aircraft: 82
- Source: Federal Aviation Administration

Bakersfield Municipal Airport (FAA LID: L45) is a city-owned public-use airport located three nautical miles (6 km) south of the central business district of Bakersfield, a city in Kern County, California, United States. The airport is mostly used for general aviation.

== History ==
During World War II the airfield was used by the United States Army Air Forces, as Bakersfield Army Air Field, Air Transport Command as a sub-base of Hammer Field. Early US jet fighters, Bell P-59 Airacomet, were operating from the Airport in 1943.

== Facilities and aircraft ==
Bakersfield Municipal Airport covers an area of 253 acres (102 ha) at an elevation of 378 feet (115 m) above mean sea level. It has one runway designated 16/34 with an asphalt surface measuring 4,000 by 75 feet (1,219 x 23 m).

For the 12-month period ending April 13, 2009, the airport had 25,000 general aviation aircraft operations, an average of 68 per day. At that time there were 82 aircraft based at this airport: 90% single-engine and 10% multi-engine.

== See also ==
- California World War II Army Airfields
- List of airports in Kern County, California
