= Laughlin/Bullhead International Airport =

Airport in Mohave County, Arizona

- IATA: IFP; ICAO: KIFP; FAA LID: IFP

Summary
- Airport type: Public
- Owner: Mohave County
- Operator: Mohave County Airport Authority
- Serves: Laughlin, Nevada area
- Location: Bullhead City, Arizona
- Elevation AMSL: 707 ft (215 m)
- Coordinates: 35°09′22″N 114°33′34″W
- Website: flyifp.com

Maps
- FAA airport diagram as of January 2021
- Location within Arizona Location within the United States

Runways
Direction	Length		Surface
Direction	ft	m	Surface
16/34	8,500	2,591	Asphalt

Statistics (2016)
- Aircraft operations: 26,726
- Based aircraft: 22
- Source: Federal Aviation Administration

Laughlin/Bullhead International Airport (IATA: IFP, ICAO: KIFP, FAA LID: IFP) is a public use airport located 1.15 miles (1.00 nmi; 1.85 km) north of the central business district of Bullhead City, in Mohave County, Arizona, United States. It is owned by Mohave County. The airport is across the Colorado River and one block away from Laughlin, Nevada. Many of the rooms at Laughlin's casino-hotels offer a view of the airport. It was named 2011 Airport of the Year by the Arizona Department of Transportation.

This facility is included in the National Plan of Integrated Airport Systems, which categorized it as a primary commercial service airport (more than 10,000 enplanements per year). As per Federal Aviation Administration records, the airport had 122,192 passenger boardings (enplanements) in calendar year 2008, 107,595 enplanements in 2009, and 121,468 in 2010.

== History ==
In 1943, land was purchased from the state of Arizona for construction of Davis Dam power plant that was initiated by the Bureau of Reclamation in 1947. In 1943, the airport was established on Bureau of Land Management property about two miles south of the Davis Dam power plant construction site. The employees of the Davis Dam project graded and used the airport. In 1953, the dam was completed, and residential development commenced in the Bullhead City, Lake Mohave and Mohave Valley areas. Mohave County leased the Bullhead City Airport from BLM in 1968, and in 1971 the county subleased a portion of the Bullhead Airport to Bullhead Airport Inc., a private enterprise which provided fixed-base operation services.

In 1972, ADOT provided a $15,000 grant to aid in an airport improvement project for runway relocation, drainage, marking, lighting and fencing. In 1979, a new 25-year lease for the entire 135 acre airport was negotiated by the county with the newly formed Mohave County Airport Authority. In 1980, the Bullhead Airport Inc. sublease was renegotiated and ADOT provided $91,000 to overlay the old aircraft parking apron and extend it to the north. The FBO provided $10,000 to make other facility improvements. In 1983 BLM transferred airport property to the state of Arizona. In 1986 the Arizona State Land Department sold property that included the airport parcel to Bullhead Airport Inc through public auction with two stipulations. The buyer would have to dedicate 433 acres to Mohave County for airport use, and the buyer would need to complete a flood control project within two years of land purchase. In 1987 FAA and ADOT grants and entitlements were used to commence construction, and Mohave County Airport Authority formed two executive committees, one for Kingman and one for Bullhead/Laughlin. A whole new facility was then constructed on the east side of the original airport, opening in the early 1990s. The new facility included a much longer runway able to accommodate large jet traffic. The airport name was then changed to the current Laughlin/Bullhead City International Airport and a new IATA/FAA code of "IFP" was adopted, for "International Fun Place". The previous code had been "BHC" for "Bullhead City Airport".

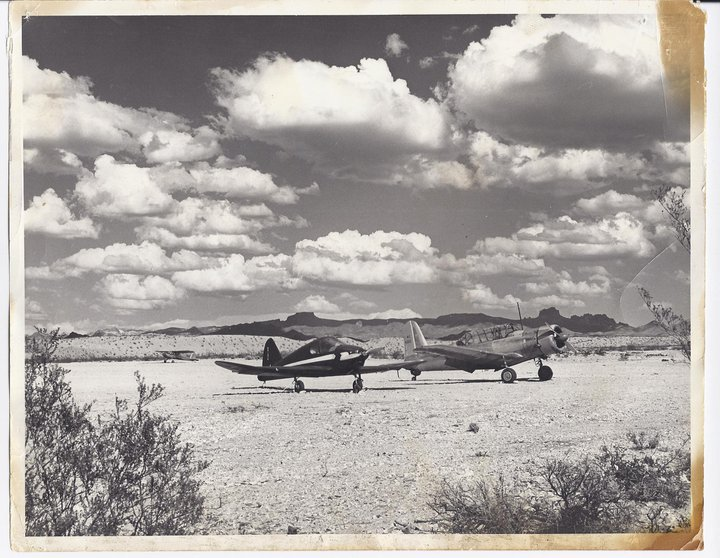
Bullhead Airport (circa 1940s)

=== Historical passenger service ===
During the 1980s the airport was served extensively by several commuter airlines including StatesWest Airlines, Mesa Airlines, Sun West Airlines, Air L.A., Golden Pacific Airlines, Scenic Airlines and Havasu Airlines which briefly operated under a code-share with Braniff. Flights were mainly operated to Phoenix, Las Vegas, and throughout Southern California. By the early 1990s, several of the commuter airlines began code-sharing with major airlines which included America West Express operated by Mesa Airlines, United Express, also operated by Mesa Airlines, and USAir Express, operated by StatesWest Airlines. All were operating Beechcraft 1900 commuter propjets and USAir Express briefly operated de Havilland Canada DHC-8 Dash 8 turboprops to Los Angeles. Upon opening of the new facility in 1993, airlines such as Air Laughlin, Vanguard Airlines, and Viscount Air Services began operating Boeing 737 and McDonnell Douglas DC-9 charter flights from Sky Harbor International Airport (PHX) in Phoenix. According to the Official Airline Guide, by February 1993 Morris Air began operating scheduled nonstop service between the airport and Salt Lake City (SLC) and later to San Francisco (SFO) with Boeing 737-300 jets. By December, 1993, Morris Air was operating scheduled nonstop Boeing 737-300 service between the airport and Oakland (OAK) and San Jose (SJC) as well as SLC. According to the April 1994 edition of the Official Airline Guide (OAG), Morris Air left the airport on June 5, 1994 and six months later Reno Air began service with McDonnell Douglas MD-80 flights five days a week from San Jose International Airport (SJC). Reno Air's jet service was also short-lived, ending on May 21, 1997. America West Express and United Express continued to operate propjets with nonstop and direct one stop service from Los Angeles International Airport (LAX), nonstop flights from Long Beach Airport (LGB), nonstop flights from Ontario International Airport (ONT), and nonstop and direct service from Phoenix Sky Harbor International Airport (PHX). Many flights to Phoenix would stop at Lake Havasu City, Arizona. Other commuter airlines that briefly served the Laughlin/Bullhead City Airport in the 1990s include Arizona Airways with nonstop flights from Tucson International Airport (TUS) as well as direct one stop flights from Albuquerque (ABQ). Pacific Coast Airlines provided service to San Diego and Eagle Canyon Airlines to Las Vegas. A number of flights, especially those operated with mainline jet aircraft, were offered in conjunction with hotel packages. FedEx Express became the airport's main cargo airline during that decade. United Express ended their commuter flights to Los Angeles on November 9, 1996 and America West Express service to Phoenix ended in June, 2001.

In 2002, Sun Country Airlines initiated new jet service to Bullhead City from Minneapolis/St Paul, MN (MSP). The airline ultimately decided to make Laughlin/Bullhead International Airport a small hub for the southwestern U.S. region. In 2004 Ryan International Airlines returned the chartered jet services from the Phoenix area, flying between Bullhead City and the Phoenix-Mesa Gateway Airport (AZA), with McDonnell Douglas MD-82 jetliners. Passenger service was also operated by Western Express Air to Phoenix Deer Valley Airport in Arizona as well as Riverside Municipal Airport (RAL) in California with small commuter turboprop aircraft; however, these flights ended when that airline ceased operations at the end of May 2007.

The airport briefly saw a return in scheduled commercial service from February 16, 2017 through February 14, 2018, when American Eagle, operating via a code sharing agreement on behalf of American Airlines, provided a single daily flight to and from Phoenix (PHX) using a Bombardier CRJ700 series regional jet. However, this service proved to be unprofitable and was terminated after one year. The airport currently does not have any scheduled passenger service although regular casino charter flights provided by Sun Country Airlines and Allegiant Air continue to utilize the airport.

=== Airport upgrades ===
In 2008, the airport got a multimillion-dollar expansion and a heightened security system. During the same year, a Boeing 747SP widebody jetliner landed on the recently expanded runway.

On October 14, 2026, the U.S. Air Force's VC-25B Bridge aircraft, a modified Boeing 747-8, landed at the airport while operating as Air Force One and carrying President Donald Trump.

=== Past airshows ===
In March 2010 the airport hosted "Legends Over the Colorado", an air show with additional displays of an original Boeing B-17 Flying Fortress from World War II. The plane is part of the Commemorative Air Force Arizona Wing of the Commemorative Air Force, a Texas-based nonprofit organization that has fully restored the B-17 Flying Fortress Sentimental Journey. Also on display were a North American T-6 Texan and four other warbirds.

On April 9–10, 2011, Laughlin/Bullhead International Airport held the second annual "Legends Over the Colorado". The main attraction was "FIFI", the only flying Boeing B-29 Superfortress in the world along with two North American P-51 Mustangs, a Japanese Mitsubishi A6M Zero, and several other World War II-era warbirds.

=== Upgraded baggage facility ===
July 20, 2011, marked the opening of the new baggage claim building connected to the main terminal.

=== Passenger charter traffic in 2016 ===
More than 109,000 people flew into Laughlin/Bullhead International Airport on casino-sponsored charter flights in 2016.

=== 2026 Trump Rally ===
ahead of the October 2026 midterm elections Donald Trump hosted an open air rally at the airport in support of Arizona and Nevada Republicans ahead of the 2026 midterm elections. Later that day he would do a rally in Montana.

== Facilities ==
Laughlin/Bullhead International Airport covers an area of 650 acres (260 ha) at an elevation of 707 ft (215 m) above mean sea level. It has one runway designated 16/34 with an asphalt surface measuring 8,500 ft × 150 ft (2,591 m × 46 m). The runway was recently reconstructed. Paid for by grants, actual site preparation was due to begin in 2013, and the date of completion was set for some time in 2013. Site preparation and drainage for extending runway 16/34 1000 ft. was completed in early 2016. Phase 2 of the Runway 16/34 & Taxiway extension project was completed in early 2017, which included a 1000 ft extension of the runway and taxiway A, the addition of taxiway A9, and electrical improvements. Runway 16/34 is now 8,500 ft x 150 ft.

A 8,500-by-75-foot (2,591 m × 23 m) taxiway extends the length of the runway, connected seven taxiways. Taxiway A3, a high speed taxiway, is often used when landing to the north on Runway 34, as it leads to the terminal apron.

A rotating beacon is located to the east of the runway near mid-field, on top of the air traffic control tower. The beacon operates during night hours, and when instrument meteorological conditions exist at the airport. The runway and taxiways have medium intensity lighting systems (MILS). Runway End Identifier Lights (REIL) are at each end of the runway, as well as lights showing the end of the threshold. A Precision Approach Path Indicator system is at each end. "Lighted airfield signs at [IFP] are at aircraft hold positions, taxiway intersections, and at the intersection of the connecting taxiways and runways". There are also mandatory hold signs. The medium intensity runway lighting can be turned on by a pilot clicking the radio transmission button in the cockpit. Airfield markings control the traffic efficiently on the ground. Runway 16/34 has centerline, threshold markings, aiming points, and runway designation markings. Taxiways have hold short markings before runway intersections and centerlines. The airport's aprons have centerlines to control traffic and designated tie down areas. A segmented circle is located to the west of the runway, mid-field, for visual reference on how a pilot should fly the traffic pattern for the runway.

IFP has features that allow pilots in the area to be better informed of weather at the airport. These provide accurate and up-to-date weather information. Three lighted wind socks show wind directions and approximate speed. An Automated Weather Observation System (AWOS) was installed in 2007 and records weather data such as wind speed, wind gusts, wind direction, variable wind direction, temperature, dew point, altimeter setting, density altitude, visibility, variable visibility, precipitation, sky condition, and cloud height. The AWOS data can be heard in an aircraft if the pilot tunes in to 119.825 on the radio controls.

Three main navigational aids assist pilots with navigation: very high frequency omnidirectional range facilities (VOR), a Loran-C, and a global positioning system (GPS). These can only be used with properly equipped aircraft. Although IFP does not have a VOR on the field, there are three at airports nearby: Kingman VOR/DME (distance measuring equipment) is to the east, Needles VORTAC (military tactical air navigational aids) is to the south, and Goffs VORTAC is to the west. GPS does not need facilities on the ground for navigational guidance because it uses satellites orbiting the Earth to triangulate the aircraft's position. Loran-C basically works the same way as a GPS, but with ground-based facilities around the country. Therefore, IFP does not have any navigational aids on airport property.

IFP has three instrument approaches. Runway 16 has a GPS approach. Runway 34 has a GPS approach and a VOR approach using the Needles VORTAC. The GPS approach provides vertical guidance as well as course (horizontal) guidance. The Needles VORTAC approach only gives pilots course guidance. Runway 34's GPS approach provides the lowest minimums for the airport. The FAA approach plate for this instrument approach is shown in Appendix B. The GPS LPV approach allows aircraft to come down to about 640 feet above ground level (AGL). All landing traffic in VFR weather is kept to the west of the airfield. Right-turning traffic is for Runway 16 and left-turning traffic is for Runway 34.

An airport traffic control tower is used to control traffic on the ground at IFP and in the vicinity. It is only operational from 8:00 am to 6:00 pm Mountain Standard Time, the local time zone. The control tower is stationed at about midfield on the east side. When the control tower is closed, area traffic use the Common Traffic Advisory Frequency (CTAF). During non-towered hours, landing traffic operating under instrument flight rules (IFR) are controlled by the Los Angeles air route traffic control facility.

There are numerous landside facilities at IFP. A terminal that has ticket sales, security screening, rental car services, and airport administration is on the north side of the apron, connected to the departure holdroom by a covered walkway. There are no actual gates. Passengers walk out to their planes from the holdroom. Both of those use a pair of parking lots that have about 400 spaces. A rescue and firefighting building holds a rescue/firefighting vehicle as well as maintenance vehicles. There are also a charter bus loading area, a fuel farm owned and operated by Signature Flight Support which offers Jet A and 100LL, and 34 hangars ranging widely in sizes.

=== Fixed-base operator (FBO) ===
- Touch & Go FBO

=== Aircraft Rescue and Firefighting Department ===
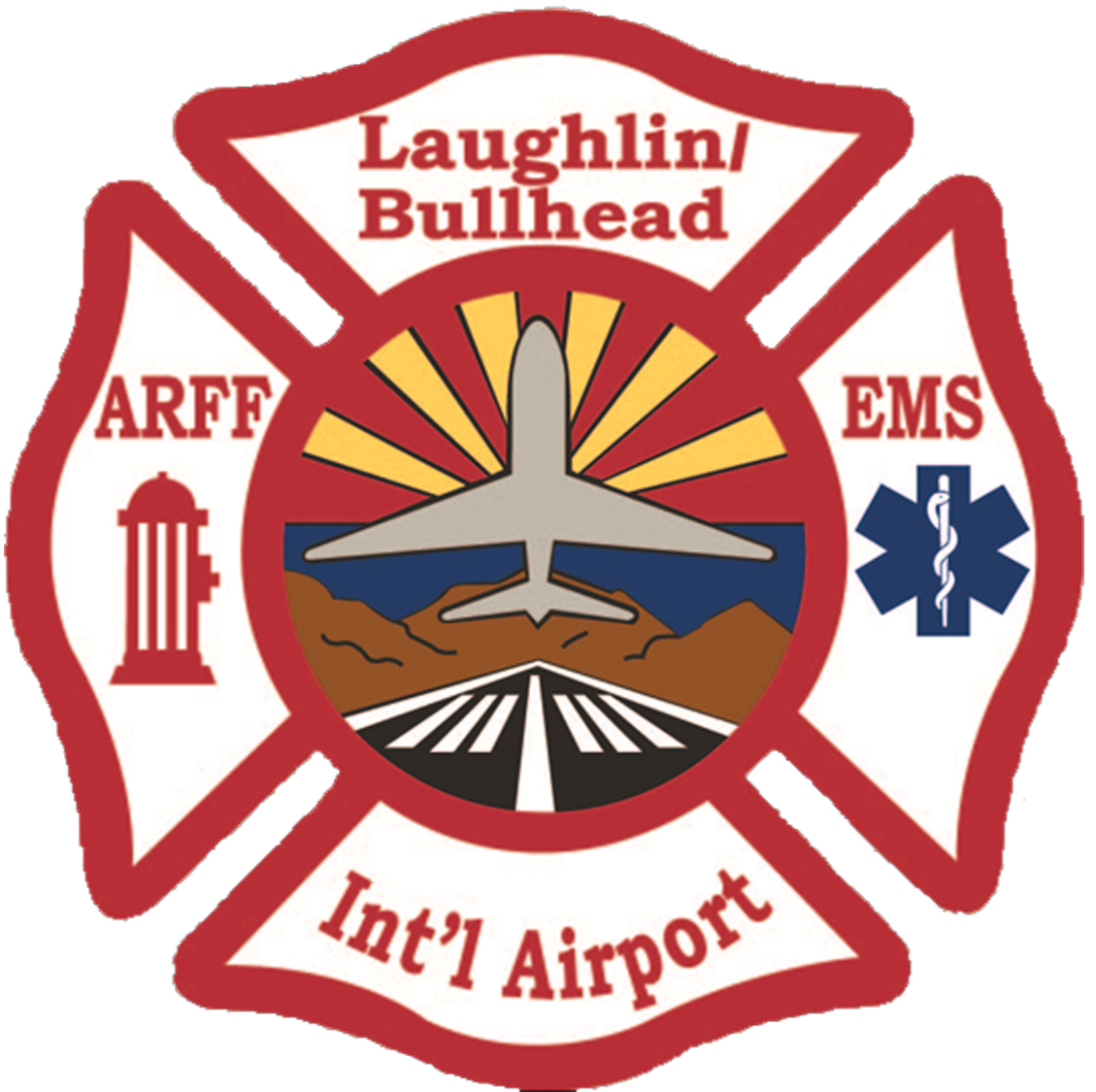
Laughlin/Bullhead International Airport Fire Department

In October 1991, Station 4 was opened at the Laughlin/Bullhead International Airport and was staffed full-time by the Bullhead City Fire Department. In 1997, the Mohave County Airport Authority (MCAA) elected to establish its own Aircraft Rescue and Firefighting (ARFF) department in order to currently maintain an ARFF Index of "B". This department currently employs six firefighters, and the station is staffed twenty-four hours a day, seven days a week. In September 2011, the Mohave County Airport Authority was awarded two airport improvement grants totaling $7.6 million from the Federal Aviation Administration. One of these grants was for construction of a new ARFF facility and the purchase of a new 2013 Oshkosh Striker ARFF apparatus.

=== Aircraft ===
For the 12-month period ending December 31, 2016, the airport had 26,726 aircraft operations, an average of 73 per day: 23% general aviation, 9% air taxi, 4% scheduled commercial, and 64% military. At that time there were 22 aircraft based at this airport: 69% single-engine, 17% helicopter, 14% multi-engine, and 0% jet.

== In popular culture ==
The airport is seen as the departing airport for a "Sierra Airlines" flight to Fresno in the opening scenes of the 2003 comedy film View from the Top.

== See also ==
- List of airports in Arizona
