= Santa Rosa CityBus =

Public transit operator in Santa Rosa, California

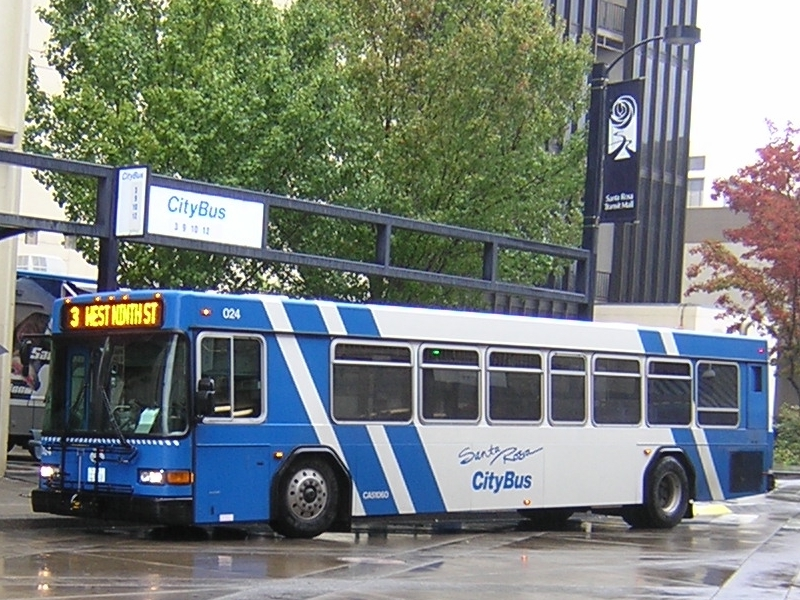
- Parent: City of Santa Rosa
- Service area: Santa Rosa, California, United States
- Service type: Bus service; Paratransit
- Routes: 18
- Stops: Over 400
- Hubs: Santa Rosa Transit Mall
- Fleet: 29 buses
- Website: srcitybus.org

Santa Rosa CityBus is a public transportation agency providing bus service in the northern California city of Santa Rosa. It provides service for over 2.8 million passenger trips annually as of 2010.

== Routes ==
A total of 18 routes are operated by Santa Rosa CityBus, most of them operating in loops (usually in a clockwise direction). Note that streets and areas indicated in italics means that the area is served by a one-way loop, not a return service.

On May 21, 2017, Santa Rosa City Bus was scheduled to adjust its network significantly as a result of the agency's Reimagining Project, held in collaboration with the City of Santa Rosa and its residents.

The routes below are valid since May 2017.

Route	Main road/area served	Attractions served	Primary terminal/s
1	Mendocino Avenue/Coddingtown Mall	Santa Rosa Junior College, Mendocino Marketplace, Kaiser Hospital, Northside Transfer Center (for Coddingtown Mall)	Santa Rosa Transit Mall, Northside Transfer Center
2/2B	Sebastopol Road/Corporate Center	Railroad Square, Santa Rosa Industrial Park West, Stony Point Plaza, Northpoint Business Park, Corporate Center	Santa Rosa Transit Mall
2/2B	Sebastopol Road/North Wright Road	Santa Rosa Plaza, Railroad Square, Santa Rosa Industrial Park West, Stony Point Plaza, Sam Jones Hall	Santa Rosa Transit Mall
3	Santa Rosa Avenue	Downtown, Santa Rosa Marketplace, Santa Rosa Town Center	Santa Rosa Transit Mall
4/4B	Rincon Valley/Mission Blvd/Calistoga Road	Downtown, Eastside Transfer Station (for Montgomery Village), Montecito Shopping Center, St. Francis Shopping Center	Santa Rosa Transit Mall
5	Petaluma Hill Road	Downtown, Santa Rosa Marketplace	Santa Rosa Transit Mall
6	Fulton Road	Railroad Square, Stony Point Plaza, A Place to Play Park, Fulton Marketplace, Youth Community Park, Rosewood Village Shopping Center, Schulz Museum, Coddingtown Mall	Santa Rosa Transit Mall, Northside Transfer Center
7^{8}	Montgomery Village/Coddingtown Mall	Coddingtown Mall, Mendocino Center, Santa Rosa Junior College, Flamingo One Stop Center, Eastside Transfer Station, Montgomery Village	Northside Transfer Center
8	Bennett Valley	Santa Rosa YMCA, Flamingo One Stop Center, Eastside Transfer Station, Montgomery Village, Sutter Warrack Hospital, Annadel Shopping Center, Bennett Valley Shopping Center, Mayette Shopping Center	Santa Rosa Transit Mall
9/9E	West Ninth Street/Finley Community Center	Railroad Square, Westside Transfer Center (for Finley Community Center)	Santa Rosa Transit Mall
9/9E	West Ninth Street/E Street	Clockwise loop: Railroad Square, Westside Transfer Center (for Finley Community Center)	Santa Rosa Transit Mall
10	Coddingtown Mall/Coffey Lane	Santa Rosa Plaza, Northside Transfer Station, Coddingtown Mall, Schulz Museum, KMART Northside Center, Round Barn Boulevard^{7}, Kaiser Hospital, Golden Gate Transit Terminal	Santa Rosa Transit Mall, Northside Transfer Center
12	Roseland	Railroad Square, Auto Mall, Department of Motor Vehicles, Southside Transfer Center, Santa Rosa Industrial Park West	Santa Rosa Transit Mall, Southside Transfer Center
15	Stony Point Road	Coddingtown Mall, Marlow Shopping Center, Finley Community Center, Westside Transfer Center, Stony Point Business Park, Stony Point Center, Southside Transfer Center	Northside Transfer Center, Southside Transfer Center
16	Oakmont Shuttle West	Operates in the western part of Oakmont, shuttling passengers between Berger Center, West Recreation Center, and several malls (Saint Francis Center, Montgomery Village, Montecito Shopping Center, and CVS Pharmacy (at Farmers Lane)).	Berger Center
16	Oakmont Shuttle East	Operates in the eastern part Oakmont, shuttling passengers between Berger Center, East Recreation Center, West Golf Course, and several malls (Saint Francis Center, Montgomery Village, Montecito Shopping Center, and CVS Pharmacy (at Farmers Lane)).	Berger Center
18	East Circulator	Senior Center, Sonoma County Fairgrounds (Park-and-Ride), Farmers Lane Plaza, Eastside Transfer Center (for Montgomery Village), Mayette Shopping Center	Santa Rosa Transit Mall
19^{8}	North Circulator/Chanate Rd/Guerneville Road	Coddingtown Mall, Mendocino Center, Fountaingrove Golf Course, Westside Transfer Center, Marlow Shopping Center, Fulton Marketplace	Northside Transfer Center

- ^{1}15-minute service on entire route.
- ^{2}15-minute service for a section of this route.
- ^{3}15-minute service where combined with route 5.
- ^{4}15-minute service where combined with route 3.
- ^{5}Operates on weekdays only.
- ^{6}Route 9E operates during school bell times only.
- ^{7}Route 10 Round Barn Blvd. loop operates on weekdays only.
- ^{8}Route 7 and 19 currently don't operate.

A Santa Rosa CityBus operating as Route 10 (Coddingtown)

== Transit Mall and transfer centers ==
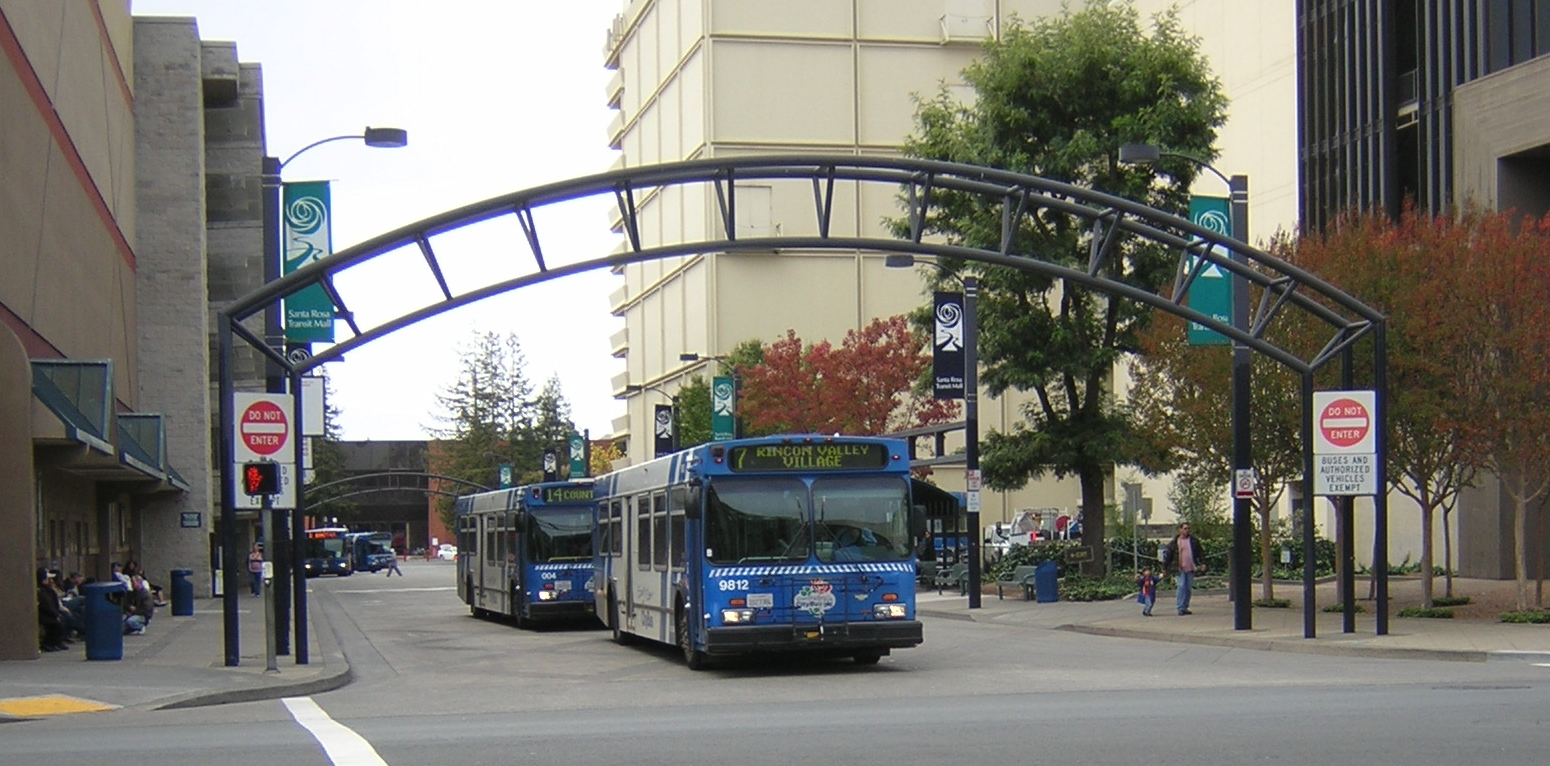
Santa Rosa Transit Mall

The downtown Transit Mall, a segment of Second Street between Santa Rosa Avenue and B Street, is the main transfer point for several bus agencies, including Sonoma County Transit, Golden Gate Transit, and Mendocino Transit Authority, and most CityBus routes begin and end their trips there.

In May 2000, the city opened the Westside Transfer Center as an additional transfer point, where Routes 3, 6, and 15 make stops. There are also several transfer centers within the city, including:

- Northside Transfer Center - at Range Avenue & Steele Lane, near Coddingtown Mall. Transfer point for Routes 1, 6, 7, 10, 15, and 19.
- Eastside Transfer Center - at Sonoma Avenue & Farmers Lane, across Montgomery Village. Transfer point for Routes 4, 4B, 7, 8, and 18.
- Southside Transfer Center - at Hearn Avenue & Burbank Avenue, near Roseland. Transfer point for Routes 12 and 15.
- Westside Transfer Center - at Stony Point Road & W College Avenue, near Finley Community Center. Transfer point for Routes 9, 15, and 19.

== Fleet ==
=== Active ===
Fleet number(s)	Thumbnail	Build date	Manufacturer	Model	Engine	Transmission	Notes
24113-24119		2011	NFI	XDE40	Cummins ISL9	BAE Systems HDS 200 hybrid system	
24403-24408		2014	NFI	XD40	Cummins ISL9	Allison B400R	
24606-24609		2016	NFI	XD40	Cummins ISL9	Allison B400R	
24504-24509		2025	Gillig	Low Floor Plus EV 40'			
24817-24818		2017	ElDorado	Axess BRT	Cummins L9	Voith D864.6	
24819-24820		2018	ElDorado	Axess BRT	Cummins L9	Voith D864.6	
24200-24203		2022	Proterra	ZX5			HVIP powered (hybrid and zero-emission); Inactive since late 2025
24419-24420		2024	Ford	E-450			Cutaway vans serving Routes 16 and 18
24918-24923		2019	Gillig	Low Floor HEV 40'	Cummins L9	Allison hybrid system	ex-Golden Gate Transit 1900 series, leased from August 2025

=== Retired ===
This roster is incomplete.

Fleet number(s)	Thumbnail	Build date	Manufacturer	Model	Engine	Transmission	Notes
001-006		2000	NFI	D40LF	Detroit Diesel Series 50 EGR	Allison B400R	002, 003 & 005 pulled from service in 2017.; 001, 004 & 006 returned to service in early 2018 and pulled from service in April 2019
008		1999	Thomas Dennis	SLF 230	Cummins ISB	Allison	Auctioned off as a non-runner on June 28, 2014.; Bought by TransMetro Inc.; to San Francisco State University S02.
021-025		2002	Gillig	Low Floor 40' (G27D102N4)	Cummins ISL	Voith D864.3E	
026		2002	Gillig	Low Floor 29' (G27E102R2)	Cummins ISL	Voith D864.3E	
103		1960	GMC	TGH-3102	GMC 270		
105		1960	GMC	TGH-3102	GMC 270		
106-107		1964	GMC	TGH-3501	GMC 451	GMC Hydramatic	
108		1966	GMC	TGH-3501	GMC 451	GMC Hydramatic	
109		1968	GMC	TGH-3502	GMC 451		
340		2003	OBI	Orion V	Cummins ISM	Allison B500R	
701-702		2007	CCW	Phantom 35'; Gasoline-Electric Hybrid	Ford Triton V10	ISE ThunderVolt hybrid system	Ex 911-912; refurbished 1991 Gillig Phantom (3596TB6V92TA).; 702 was auctioned off as a non-runner on August 22, 2015; more than likely scrapped.; 701 was also more than likely scrapped.
814-816		2008	Gillig	BRT HEV 29'	Cummins ISL	Allison EP40	Retired in 2025
831-839		1983	Grumman Flxible	870 (35096-6T)	Detroit Diesel 6V92TA	Allison V730	Delivered in May 1983.; 831 & an unknown unit were bought by a private owner/GTMC Express and were used for the Watsonville County Fair. They were listed on Craigslist in Hollister, CA on 8/22/2018.; 834 was bought by a private owner in Davis, CA. It was still regularly seen around the area as of 2016.
841-846		1984	Gillig	Phantom 35' (35TB966V92)	Detroit Diesel 6V92TA	Allison HT-747	842 & 841 to Waukesha Metro Transit 139-140.; 843 was bought by Academy of Truck Driving in Oakland, CA and became 7. It was last spotted active in April 2014; however, it was spotted in their yard intact on 11/26/2017.
871-874		5/1987	Gillig	Phantom 35' (3596TB6V92T)	Detroit Diesel 6V92TA	Allison HT-747	
911-912		1991	Gillig	Phantom 35' (3596TB6V92TA)	Detroit Diesel 6V92TA	Allison HT-748	Both units became 701-702 around late 2007.
914-917		2009	NFI	GE40LFR	Ford Triton V10	ISE ThunderVolt hybrid system	Sold to Gardena Municipal Bus Lines 2915-2918 in 2013.
9801-9813		1998	NFI	D40LF	Detroit Diesel Series 50	Allison B400R	Retired in 2014 & 2016.; 9803, 9804 & 9809 to Petaluma Transit 43, 42, 41 in early 2014.; 9806 retired in 2014 and was auctioned off as a non-runner on June 28, 2014; bought by Complete Coach Works in Los Angeles, CA for parts.; 9802, 9807, 9808 & 9811 (damaged in an accident) were auctioned off as non-runners on June 25, 2016.; 9801, 9805 & 9810 retired in July–August 2016 and were auctioned off on August 20, 2016.; 9805 was bought by McCloud And Picchi Enterprises Inc. DBA Thunderstar Stages in Windsor, CA. It was painted grey and has been spotted multiple times in the Sonoma and Santa Rosa areas throughout 2017.; 9812's & 9813's fates remain unknown.

== Paratransit ==
Santa Rosa Paratransit, the paratransit arm of Santa Rosa CityBus and the city of Santa Rosa, provides dial-a-ride (i.e. curb to curb) transportation services within the Santa Rosa city limits and the unincorporated Roseland area. Eligibility requirements require the passenger's disability prevents him/her from using fixed route transit (Santa Rosa CityBus or other transit systems). MV Transportation is the contractor of all paratransit services in Santa Rosa.

One of CityBus' routes, Route 16 (Oakmont Shuttles), picks up Oakmont residents who are ADA Paratransit Certified at their homes for free to take them to and from locations within Oakmont. It also lets residents to get a ride home for free as well. They can go on the daily shopping trips to:

- Mondays, Wednesdays and Fridays - St. Francis Center (Safeway)
- Tuesdays - Montgomery Village
- Wednesdays - Montecito Shopping Center (Oliver’s Market)
- Thursdays - CVS Pharmacy (Farmer’s Lane)

It works as the Route 16 bus that serves Oakmont. However, as the bus travels along its regular route, it simply makes small detours to pick up ADA Paratransit Certified Oakmont residents at their homes, and then return to the regular route.

Reservations are accepted up to seven days in advance or between 8:00 and 10:00 a.m. on the same day as the ride. Reservations are scheduled on a first-come, first-served basis.
