= StatesWest Airlines =

American commuter airline

IATA	ICAO	Call sign
YW	SWJ	States
- Commenced operations: 1986; 40 years ago
- Ceased operations: 1993; 33 years ago
- Headquarters: Phoenix
- Key people: Rudy Miller

StatesWest Airlines (IATA: YW, ICAO: SWJ, call sign: States) was a commuter airline headquartered in Phoenix, Arizona that operated to destinations in the Southwestern United States.

== History ==
StatesWest was founded by Phoenix entrepreneur Rudy Miller in 1986 and began operating from its base at Phoenix Sky Harbor International Airport in 1987 with 36-passenger Short 360 turboprop aircraft. Later that year, 19-passenger British Aerospace BAe Jetstream 31 propjets were added to the fleet.

During the airline's lifespan as an independent carrier, StatesWest served San Diego, California; Bakersfield, California; Burbank, California; Ontario, California; Orange County, California; Los Angeles, California; Tucson, Arizona; Lake Havasu City, Arizona; Bullhead City, Arizona; Prescott, Arizona; Sierra Vista/Fort Huachuca, Arizona and briefly to Las Vegas, Nevada as well as Albuquerque, New Mexico and Telluride, Colorado.

In late 1988, StatesWest determined the Short 360 and Jetstream 31 aircraft were inefficient for the company's mission. Both types were phased out in favor of 19-passenger Beechcraft 1900C turboprop aircraft. In 1989, the airline entered a small niche market by offering daily nonstop service between Scottsdale, Arizona and Orange County, California, but that route was discontinued in 1990.

Future Scottsdale city council member and mayor, W.J. "Jim" Lane was elected StatesWest president and chief operating officer on January 31, 1990. Shortly after, StatesWest discontinued all flights under its own name and entered into an agreement with USAir (which was renamed US Airways and later merged into American Airlines) to operate as USAir Express by providing code sharing feeder service to USAir hubs at San Diego (SAN), Los Angeles (LAX) and San Francisco (SFO) which were focus cities of the original Pacific Southwest Airlines (PSA) route system. USAir completed its acquisition of and merger with PSA in 1988. The USAir Express operation began on July 15, 1990, and also included flights at Phoenix (PHX) and Tucson (TUS).

During the contract with USAir, StatesWest acquired four Dash 8 aircraft that where later replace with three 13-passenger Beechcraft 1300 turboprop aircraft to supplement the fleet of B1900Cs. Many new routes were added including several that had been previously flown by Pacific Southwest Airlines (PSA) with jet aircraft and were later discontinued by USAir such as to Concord and Stockton, California. The aircraft were painted in USAir colors but included a smile under the nose thus remembering and honoring PSA which had been acquired by USAir 1n 1987. In late 1992 StatesWest declared bankruptcy and closed its doors the following year as USAir sharply reduced its operations in California.

== USAir Express destinations in 1991 ==
According to the Official Airline Guide (OAG), StatesWest was operating USAir Express service with Beechcraft commuter turboprop aircraft on behalf of USAir in 1991 via a code sharing agreement to the following destinations with hubs located in Los Angeles (LAX) and San Francisco (SFO)

- Bakersfield (BFL)
- Bullhead City/Laughlin
- Concord (CCR)
- Fresno (FAT)
- Los Angeles (LAX) - Hub
- Monterey (MRY)
- Ontario (ONT)
- Orange County (SNA)
- Palm Springs (PSP)
- Sacramento (SMF)
- San Diego (SAN)
- Santa Barbara (SBA)
- San Francisco (SFO) - Hub
- Stockton (SCK)

== Fleet ==
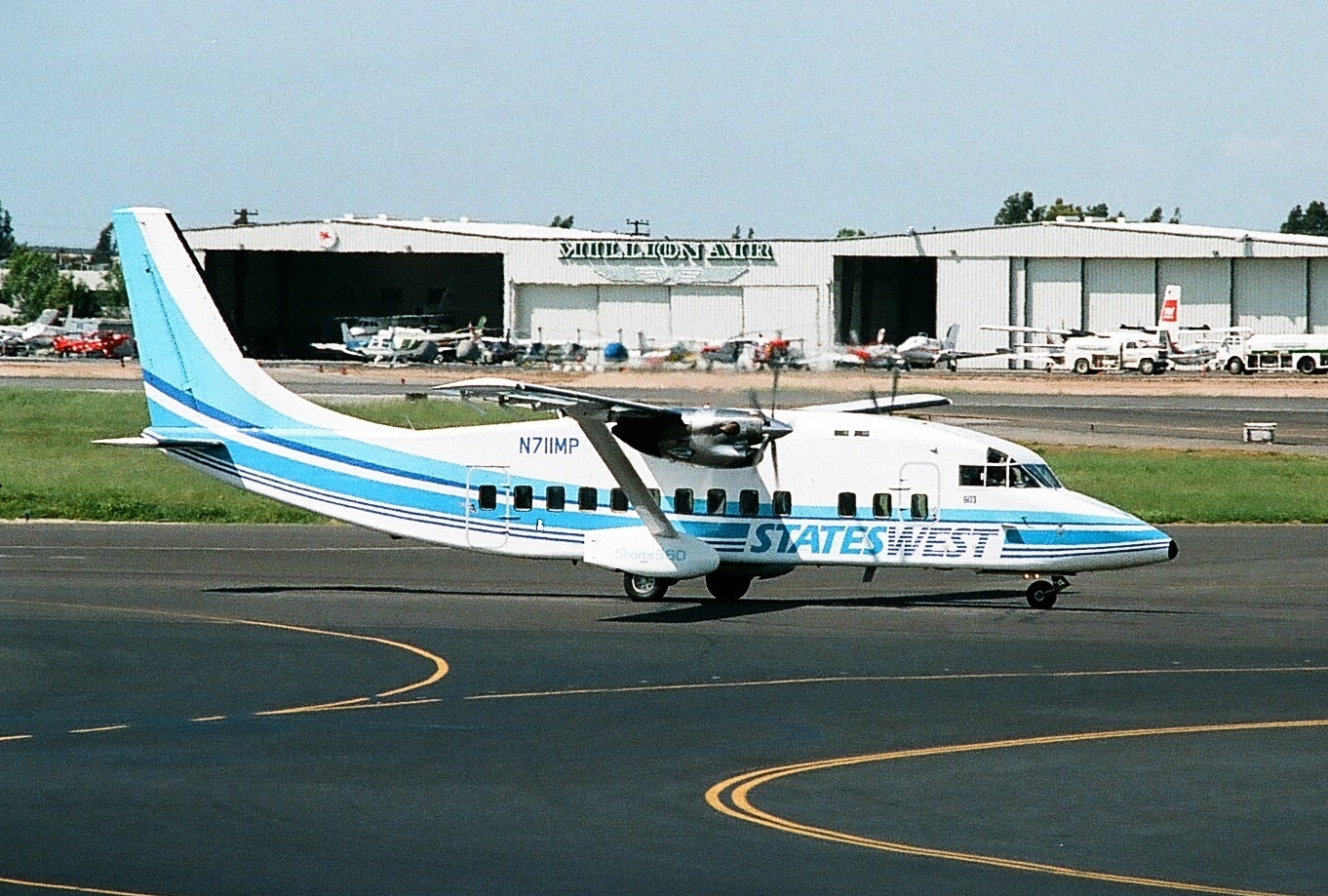
StatesWest Airlines Shorts 360

StatesWest operated the following turboprop aircraft types at various times during its existence:

- BAe Jetstream 31
- Beechcraft 1900C
- Beechcraft 1300 (Super King Air modified for commuter airline operations)
- de Havilland Canada Dash 8-100
- Short 360

== Destinations ==
StatesWest served the following destinations at various times during its existence, both as an independent airline and as an USAir Express air carrier:

Arizona

- Bullhead City/Laughlin
- Lake Havasu City
- Phoenix
- Prescott
- Sierra Vista/Fort Huachuca
- Scottsdale
- Tucson

California

- Bakersfield (US*)
- Burbank
- Concord (US*)
- Fresno (US*)
- Los Angeles
- Monterey (US*)
- Ontario
- Orange County
- Palm Springs (US*)
- Sacramento (US*)
- San Diego
- Santa Barbara (US*)
- Stockton (US*)

Colorado

- Telluride

Nevada

- Las Vegas

New Mexico

- Albuquerque

(US*) designates destinations that were added after StatesWest became a USAir Express code share operator.

== See also ==
- List of defunct airlines of the United States
