= Santa Rosa Transit Mall =

Coordinates: 38°26′19″N 122°42′49″W

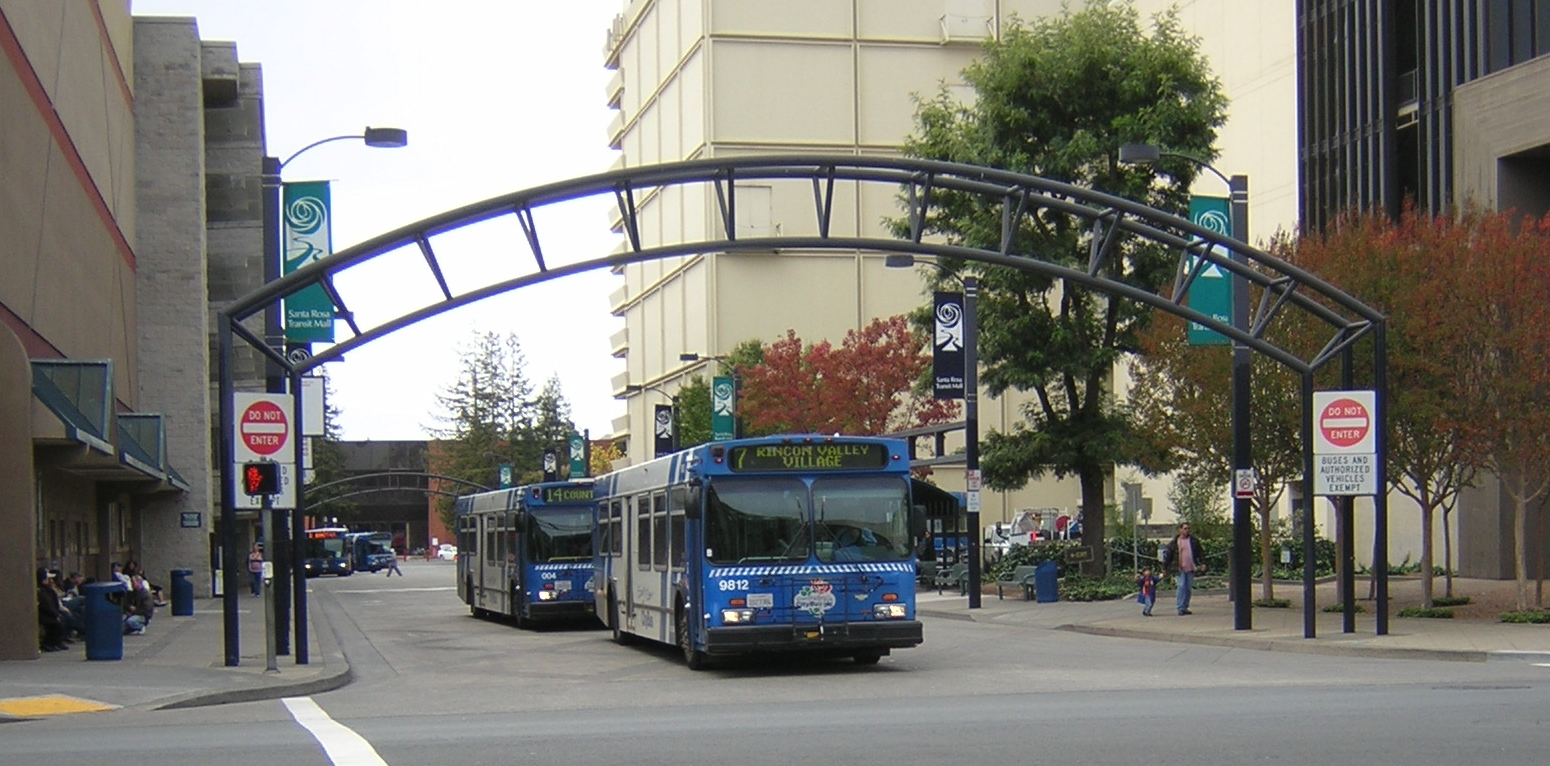
Santa Rosa Transit Mall

The Santa Rosa Transit Mall is a major transfer point for several bus routes serving the city of Santa Rosa, California, located in Sonoma County, north of San Francisco, in the United States. From the Transit Mall, passengers can travel throughout Santa Rosa and Sonoma County, plus destinations that connect the city with the rest of the San Francisco Bay Area and the Redwood Empire.

== Description ==
Overview of the Transit Mall. Map is not to scale.

Santa Rosa Transit Mall serves as a transit hub for two major bus companies serving Sonoma County:

- Santa Rosa CityBus - mainly serving within Santa Rosa's city limits
- Sonoma County Transit - serves Santa Rosa with several other communities in the county

Other agencies that serve the Transit Mall include:

- Golden Gate Transit - to Marin County and San Francisco
- Mendocino Transit Authority - to the Sonoma Coast and Mendocino County

== Location ==
The Santa Rosa Transit Mall is located along Second Street (between B Street and Santa Rosa Avenue), configured as a set of bus stops within the city block. Its location being close to downtown and across from Santa Rosa Plaza allows passengers to work, shop, dine, and relax within the Transit Mall's vicinity. Its proximity also to US 101 and CA 12 allows commuters from Sonoma County and other locations to drive to the Transit Mall for commuter buses beyond Santa Rosa.

== Agencies and routes serving the transit mall ==
Agency	Route Number	Terminals		More Information
Agency	Route Number	North/East Terminal	South/West Terminal	More Information
Golden Gate Transit	72/72X; Commute periods only	Santa Rosa (Piner and Industrial)	San Francisco (Financial District)	See List of Golden Gate Transit Routes
Golden Gate Transit	74; One northbound commute trip only	Santa Rosa (Piner and Industrial)	San Francisco (Financial District)	See List of Golden Gate Transit Routes
Golden Gate Transit	80; Operates early weekday, weeknights, weekends, and holidays	Santa Rosa (Piner and Industrial)	San Francisco (Civic Center)	See List of Golden Gate Transit Routes
Golden Gate Transit	101; Limited-stop service	Santa Rosa (Piner and Industrial)	San Francisco (Civic Center)	See List of Golden Gate Transit Routes
Golden Gate Transit	101X; Commute periods only; no stops in Cotati or Marin County as Route 101	Santa Rosa (Piner and Industrial)	San Francisco (Civic Center)	See List of Golden Gate Transit Routes
Mendocino Transit Authority	65; CC Rider	Mendocino (Main St. & Lansing)	Santa Rosa (Transit Mall)	Mendocino North Coast Service
Mendocino Transit Authority	95; South Mendocino Coast	Point Arena (Downtown)	Santa Rosa (Transit Mall)	Mendocino South Coast Service
Santa Rosa CityBus	1	Mendocino Avenue		See Santa Rosa CityBus; Map and Schedules
Santa Rosa CityBus	2/2B	Sebastopol Road		See Santa Rosa CityBus; Map and Schedules
Santa Rosa CityBus	3	Santa Rosa Avenue		See Santa Rosa CityBus; Map and Schedules
Santa Rosa CityBus	4	Rincon Valley/Mission Blvd/Calistoga Road		See Santa Rosa CityBus; Map and Schedules
Santa Rosa CityBus	5	Petaluma Hill Road		See Santa Rosa CityBus; Map and Schedules
Santa Rosa CityBus	6	Fulton Road		See Santa Rosa CityBus; Map and Schedules
Santa Rosa CityBus	8	Bennett Valley		See Santa Rosa CityBus; Map and Schedules
Santa Rosa CityBus	9/9E; Route 9E operates during school bell times only	West Ninth Street/Finley Community Center		See Santa Rosa CityBus; Map and Schedules
Santa Rosa CityBus	10	Coddingtown Mall/Coffey Lane		See Santa Rosa CityBus; Map and Schedules
Santa Rosa CityBus	12	Roseland		See Santa Rosa CityBus; Map and Schedules
Santa Rosa CityBus	18	East Circulator		See Santa Rosa CityBus; Map and Schedules
Sonoma County Transit	20	Santa Rosa (Kaiser Hospital)	Monte Rio; Graton One trip	See Sonoma County Transit Routes
Sonoma County Transit	20X; Commute periods only	Santa Rosa (Transit Mall)	Occidental (Bohemian Hwy & Graton)	See Sonoma County Transit Routes
Sonoma County Transit	22; Weekdays only	Santa Rosa (Transit Mall)	Sebastopol (Laguna & McKinley)	See Sonoma County Transit Routes
Sonoma County Transit	30	Sonoma (Sonoma Plaza)	Santa Rosa (Kaiser Hospital or Coddingtown Mall)	See Sonoma County Transit Routes
Sonoma County Transit	30X; Commute periods only	Sonoma (Sonoma Plaza)	Santa Rosa (Kaiser Hospital)	See Sonoma County Transit Routes
Sonoma County Transit	34X; Commute periods only	Sonoma (Sonoma Plaza)	Santa Rosa (Transit Mall)	See Sonoma County Transit Routes
Sonoma County Transit	42; Weekdays only	Santa Rosa (Transit Mall)	Santa Rosa Industry Park West	See Sonoma County Transit Routes
Sonoma County Transit	44; Route via Sonoma State University, East Petaluma	Santa Rosa (Coddingtown)	Petaluma (Copeland St. Transit Mall)	See Sonoma County Transit Routes
Sonoma County Transit	46; Weekdays only	Santa Rosa (Transit Mall)	Rohnert Park (Sonoma State University)	See Sonoma County Transit Routes
Sonoma County Transit	48; Route via Cotati, West Petaluma	Santa Rosa (Coddingtown)	Petaluma (Copeland St. Transit Mall)	See Sonoma County Transit Routes
Sonoma County Transit	48X; Commute periods only; route via Cotati, West Petaluma	Santa Rosa (Kaiser Hospital)	Petaluma (Fairgrounds Park-and-Ride)	See Sonoma County Transit Routes
Sonoma County Transit	60	All trips: Healdsburg (Healdsburg & Dry Creek)	Santa Rosa (Transit Mall)	See Sonoma County Transit Routes
Sonoma County Transit	60	Select trips: Cloverdale (City Hall or Depot)	Santa Rosa (Transit Mall)	See Sonoma County Transit Routes
Sonoma County Transit	60X; Commute periods only	Cloverdale (Depot)	Santa Rosa (Transit Mall)	See Sonoma County Transit Routes
Sonoma County Transit	62; Weekdays only; route serves Sonoma County Airport	Windsor (Intermodal Transit Ctr.)	Santa Rosa (Transit Mall)	See Sonoma County Transit Routes
Valley of the Moon Commute Club	Sonoma-San Francisco; Weekdays only, one trip each way Route serves San Rafael Transit Center, San Francisco Transbay Terminal, BART, Muni Metro	San Francisco (Van Ness St/Hayes St. and Market St.)	Sonoma (Riverside Dr. and La Mancha Dr.)	Sonoma-San Francisco Schedule

Other major bus agencies, including Greyhound, which provides connections between Santa Rosa and the rest of the country, and Sonoma County Airport Express that provides connections between Santa Rosa and two Bay Area airports (SFO and OAK), do not stop at the Transit Mall; instead, these services stop at a hotel south of downtown. The city is also on the main route of the future Sonoma–Marin Area Rail Transit service, but, the railway station will not be built at the Transit Mall; instead, it will be built at Historic Downtown (Railroad Square), in which service from the Transit Mall is currently provided by Santa Rosa CityBus.

== Features ==
Being the main transfer point in Santa Rosa, the transit mall offers two area platforms on either side of Second Street, being the North Platform and South Platform, which allows passengers to transfer between buses easily. A multi-story parking lot (park-and-ride) is available just next to the Transit Mall, allowing commuters and visitors to drive from Sonoma County and beyond to park and ride their commuter buses or shop at nearby downtown and Santa Rosa Plaza. Other features include:

- Disabled access throughout the Transit Mall
- Hotels, shops, banks, and services located at:
  - Downtown
  - Historic Downtown
  - Santa Rosa Plaza
  - Brickyard Shopping Center
- Close proximity to:
  - Juilliard Park
  - Luther Burbank Home and Gardens (at Santa Rosa Ave. & Charles)
  - Santa Rosa City Hall (one block south)
  - University of San Francisco (Santa Rosa Campus, three blocks north)

== See also ==
- List of Golden Gate Transit routes
- Napa VINE
