= Ernest A. Love Field =

Airport in Prescott, Arizona, United States

Prescott Regional Airport

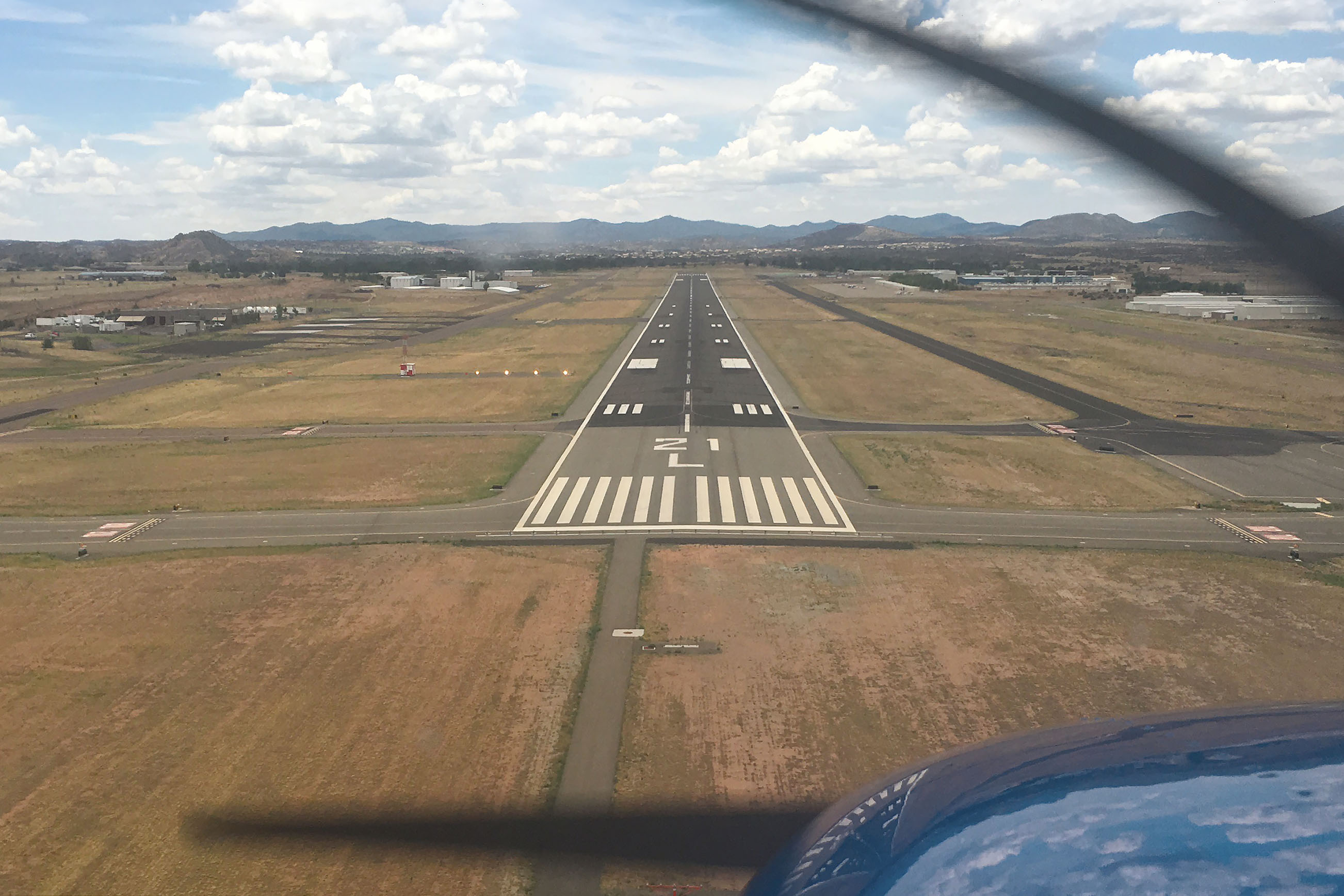
- IATA: PRC; ICAO: KPRC; FAA LID: PRC

Summary
- Airport type: Public
- Owner: City of Prescott
- Serves: Prescott, Arizona
- Location: Prescott, Arizona
- Elevation AMSL: 5,045 ft (1,538 m)
- Coordinates: 34°39′16″N 112°25′11″W
- Website: www.prcairport.com

Map
- Location within Arizona Location within the United States

Runways
Direction	Length		Surface
Direction	ft	m	Surface
3R/21L	7,619	2,322	Asphalt
3L/21R	4,846	1,477	Asphalt
12/30	4,408	1,344	Asphalt

Statistics (2022)
- Aircraft operations (year ending 7/31/2022): 310,870
- Based aircraft: 263
- Source: Federal Aviation Administration

Prescott Regional Airport, Ernest A. Love Field (IATA: PRC, ICAO: KPRC, FAA LID: PRC) is a public use airport 8 miles (7.0 nmi; 13 km) north of Prescott, in Yavapai County, Arizona, United States. Love Field is used for general aviation and facilitates scheduled passenger airline service to Denver and Los Angeles.

Most traffic at PRC is training flights from Embry–Riddle Aeronautical University but includes training flights from operations including Guidance Aviation and North-Aire.

== Namesake ==
The airport is named for Ernest A. Love (1895–1918), First Lieutenant, United States Army Air Service. Love was born in New Mexico and raised in Prescott. He was a graduate of Prescott High School and studied mechanical engineering at Stanford. He served in World War I and was shot down near Verdun, France, on 16 September 1918, and he died of his wounds as a prisoner of war a few days later. Lieutenant Love is buried at Arlington National Cemetery. The hamlet of Love, Arizona, is also named for him.

== Facilities ==
Ernest A. Love Field covers 760 acres (310 ha) at an elevation of 5,045 ft (1,538 m). It has three asphalt runways:

- 3R/21L measuring 7,619 ft × 150 ft (2,322 m × 46 m)
- 3L/21R measuring 4,846 ft × 60 ft (1,477 m × 18 m)
- 12/30 measuring 4,408 ft × 75 ft (1,344 m × 23 m)

Plans to extend Runway 3R/21L and Runway 3L/21R were mentioned in the latest master plan update in 2009. The extension onto Runway 3R/21L would be more than 3,300 feet and the extension onto Runway 3L/21R would be more than 1,300 feet.

In the year ending July 31, 2022 the airport had 310,870 aircraft operations, average 851 per day: 83% general aviation, 17% air taxi, <1% military, and <1% airline. 263 aircraft were then based at this airport: 214 single-engine, 16 multi-engine, 29 helicopter, 3 jet, and 1 glider.

=== Terminal ===
In 2019, the City of Prescott received a $10 million grant from the Federal Aviation Administration for construction of a new terminal building. The building will also be funded with $1 million from the state of Arizona and $3.5 million of local funds. The new building will have more space for passengers, security, and airline operations. The existing building is considered "antiquated and undersized." The new passenger terminal opened to the public in March 2021.

== Airline and destinations ==
=== Passenger ===
Airlines	Destinations
United Express	Denver, Los Angeles

Destinations map
Destinations from Ernest A. Love Field

== Statistics ==
=== Enplanement totals ===
Year	Passengers	Year	Passengers
2000	6,337	2010	7,836
2001	3,980	2011	5,159
2002	4,861	2012	5,152
2003	4,786	2013	5,223
2004	7,014	2014	3,862
2005	5,020	2015	3,428
2006	3,780	2016	3,451
2007	4,165	2017	5,888
2008	5,816	2018	10,337
2009	11,668	2019	27,730

=== Carrier shares ===
(September 2023 - August 2024)
Carrier	Passengers (arriving and departing)
United Express	50,900(100%)

=== Top domestic destinations ===
(September 2023 - August 2024)
Rank	City	Airport name & IATA code	Passengers	Carriers
1	Denver	Denver International Airport (DEN)	13,000	United Express
2	Los Angeles	Los Angeles International Airport (LAX)	12,000	United Express

=== Cargo ===
Airlines	Destinations	Refs
Ameriflight	Kingman, Phoenix-Sky Harbor	

=== Historical airline service ===
The first airline flights at Prescott were TWA DC-3s in late 1947.

==== 2008–2018 ====
Great Lakes Airlines served the airport since 2008, when Mesa Airlines terminated their agreement. Although Great Lakes over the last few years ran into staffing issues due to the nationwide pilot shortage, Prescott has always been one of their top destinations. In 2016, the company turned itself around and was able to pull out of its staffing problems by signing a contract with Frontier Airlines to employ their pilots after they have completed a required employment period with Great Lakes first. The company currently flies to Los Angeles and Phoenix; it cut back on the destinations it served so it could dramatically increase reliability and staffing abilities towards its profitable airports. Prescott in November received the first of several planned upgrades by the company. Great Lakes increased its total round trip daily flights to/from Los Angeles from two flights a day to four. On December 17, 2016 part two of the upgrade plan took place, which included bringing in a larger aircraft, an Embraer EMB-120, which included 30 seats, restroom facilities and flight attendant service. The company has also leased a corporate maintenance hangar on the airfield and planned to employ a full-time aircraft mechanic to turn Prescott into a west coast maintenance hub. Finally, the airline resumed flying to Denver, CO twice per week with one stop in Farmington, New Mexico. In 2017, Great Lakes reverted to two flights per day to Los Angeles and two flights per week to Denver using Beech 1900D aircraft. On March 26, 2018, Great Lakes Airlines ceased operations, terminating all scheduled flights from Ernest A. Love Field.

==== 2018–present ====
On July 17, 2018, United Airlines announced service from Ernest A. Love Field to Denver and Los Angeles with each running a daily flight, which began on August 29, 2018. United Airlines service is operated by SkyWest Airlines dba United Express operating 50 seat Bombardier CRJ-200 jet aircraft.

==== Historical ====
The following is a list of all known air carriers that have served Prescott. Most of these airlines provided flights to Phoenix and Las Vegas.

- Arizona Airways 1946–1948
- Trans World Airlines (TWA) 1947–1949
- Frontier Airlines 1950–1964
- Bonanza Airlines 1949–1968
- Air West 1968–1970
- Hughes Air West 1970–1974
- Apache Airlines early 1970s
- Cochise Airlines 1974–1982
- Golden Pacific Airlines 1982–1989
- Sun West Airlines 1984–1985
- Mesa Airlines 1989–1992
- America West Express (Mesa Airlines) 1992–2005
- Great Lakes Airlines 2005–2007
- Alaska Airlines (Horizon Air) 2008–2010
- US Airways Express (Mesa Airlines) 2007–2008
- Great Lakes Airlines 2008–2018
- United Express (SkyWest Airlines) 2018–present

== Accidents ==
- On February 28, 1959, a USAF Lockheed C-121 Super Constellation crashed 1.9 miles south of Prescott Airport after performing touch-and-gos. The aircraft crashed in rugged terrain alongside U.S. Highway 89. All five occupants were killed.

== See also ==
- List of airports in Arizona

== Other sources ==
- Essential Air Service documents (Docket DOT-OST-1996-1899) from the U.S. Department of Transportation:
  - Order 2005-3-16 (March 9, 2005): selecting Great Lakes Aviation, Ltd. to provide essential air service at Kingman, Prescott, Page, and Show Low for a new two-year period, at a combined first-year subsidy of $3,840,959, and a combined second-year subsidy of $3,854,958.
  - Order 2007-6-10 (June 13, 2007): selecting Mesa Air Group, Inc. d/b/a Air Midwest to provide subsidized essential air service at Kingman and Prescott, Arizona, for two years, beginning when the carrier full service. Service will consist of three round trips a day (18 per week) with 19-seat Beech 1900D aircraft over a Kingman Prescott Phoenix or Prescott Kingman Las Vegas routing, at a total annual subsidy of $1,798,489 for both communities.
  - Order 2008-6-11 (June 10, 2008): selecting Great Lakes Aviation, Ltd. to provide essential air service at Kingman and Prescott, Arizona, for a two-year period beginning when the carrier inaugurates full service at both communities at a combined annual subsidy of $2,898,490.
  - Order 2011-3-4 (March 1, 2011): re-selecting Great Lakes Aviation, Ltd. to provide essential air service at Kingman, Page, Prescott, and Show Low, Arizona for the two-year period from May 1, 2011, to April 30, 2013, for a combined annual subsidy of $5,596,114.
  - Order 2013-6-1 (June 3, 2013): re-selecting Great Lakes Aviation, Ltd. to provide Essential Air Service at Kingman, Page, Prescott, and Show Low, Arizona, for the two-year period from May 1, 2013, through April 30, 2015, for a combined annual subsidy of $7,873,533. Subsidy for Prescott: $2,094,235. Routing: PRC-LAX nonstop and/or DEN one-stop. Weekly Frequency: 18. Aircraft: Beechcraft 1900D. Seats: 19.
