= Pacific Coast Air Museum =

Museum in Santa Rosa, California, U.S.

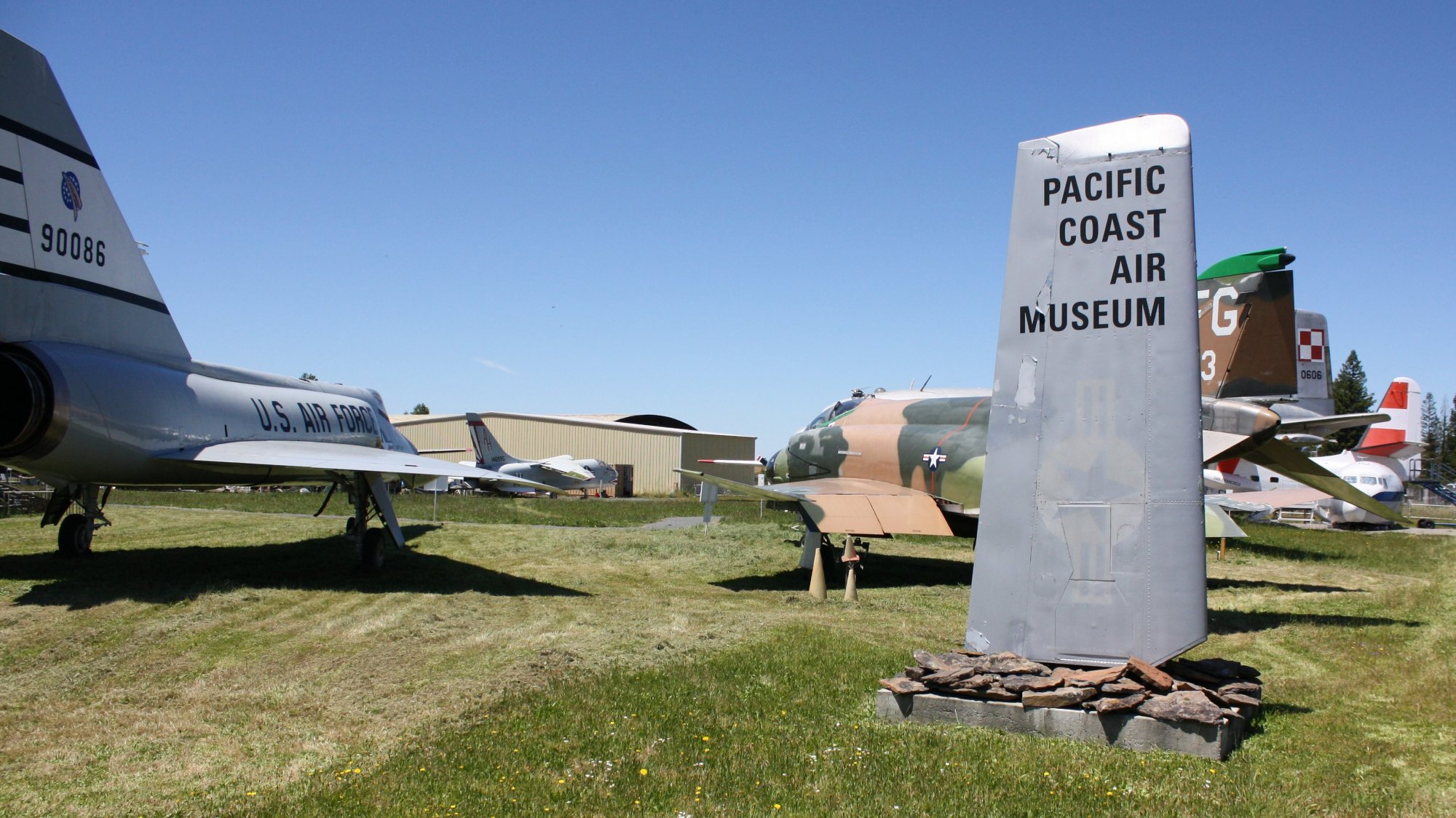

- Location within California
- Established: 1989
- Location: Charles M. Schulz Sonoma County Airport, Santa Rosa, California
- Coordinates: 38.5064°N 122.8018°W
- Type: Aviation museum
- Founder: Harrison Rued
- President: Lynn Hunt
- Website: www.pacificcoastairmuseum.org

The Pacific Coast Air Museum is an aviation museum located at Charles M. Schulz–Sonoma County Airport in Santa Rosa, California. The museum displays a varied collection of over 30 American military, propeller, and jet aircraft.

== History ==
The museum was founded in 1989, having emerged from a group associated with EAA Chapter 124. Late the following year, three members of the museum were killed when a PV-2D they were flying crashed into Clear Lake. Nevertheless, the museum expanded, acquiring a number of aircraft in the 1990s including an Il-14 and an F-8 in 1993, an A-6E in 1994, an F-16N and F-14 in 1995 and a UH-1H in 1996.

The museum merged in 1999 with the Redwood Empire Aviation Historical Society, a smaller organization. In late 2001, the museum, which had rented a variety of hangars and tie-down spots for its collection of aircraft, at the Sonoma County airport, began the process of moving to a larger facility.

In December 2010, the museum acquired an F-15 Eagle which, after launching from Otis Air National Guard Base in Massachusetts, was one of the first fighter aircraft over New York City during the September 11 attacks. The museum planned to fully restore the plane and make it the centerpiece of an exhibit.

The museum intends to build and move to a new larger facility, still at the airport. One possibility is a location on Airport Boulevard at the main entrance to the county airport, a five-acre garden tilled by inmates at Sonoma County's low-security jail.

== Facilities ==
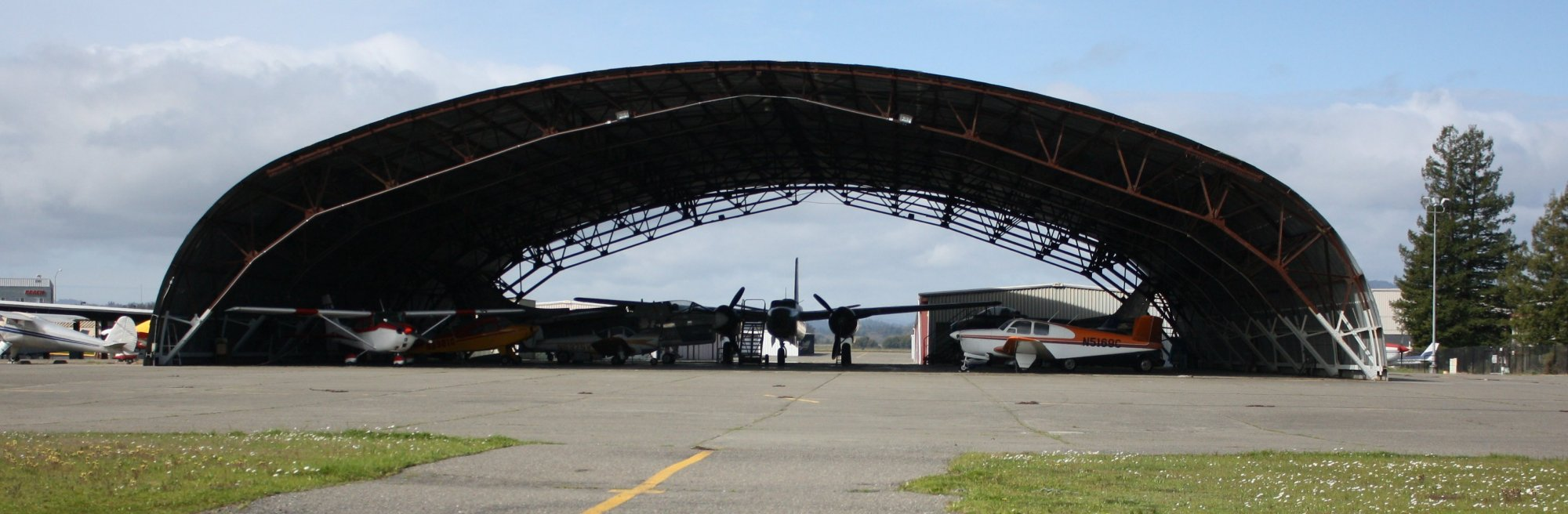
It's a Mad, Mad, Mad, Mad World airplane hangar - movie memorabilia

The museum building is the former dope and fabric shop for Santa Rosa Army Airfield.

Next to the museum, immediately to the north, is the airplane hangar used in the 1963 Hollywood all-star comedy movie, It's a Mad, Mad, Mad, Mad World. In the movie, stunt pilot Frank Tallman flies a Beech 18 through the airplane hangar, with only 23 feet of clearance from wingtip to wingtip, and only 15 feet from the top of the tail to the hangar ceiling. Known as the Butler Building, the hangar was built during World War II, and is still in use today.

== Exhibits ==
A model room includes dioramas of Santa Rosa Army Airfield and Santa Rosa Naval Auxiliary Air Station and a model of the USS Intrepid. Other objects include an R-4360 engine, SR-71 parts, an F-4N simulator and DC-6 and RF-8G cockpits.

== Collection ==
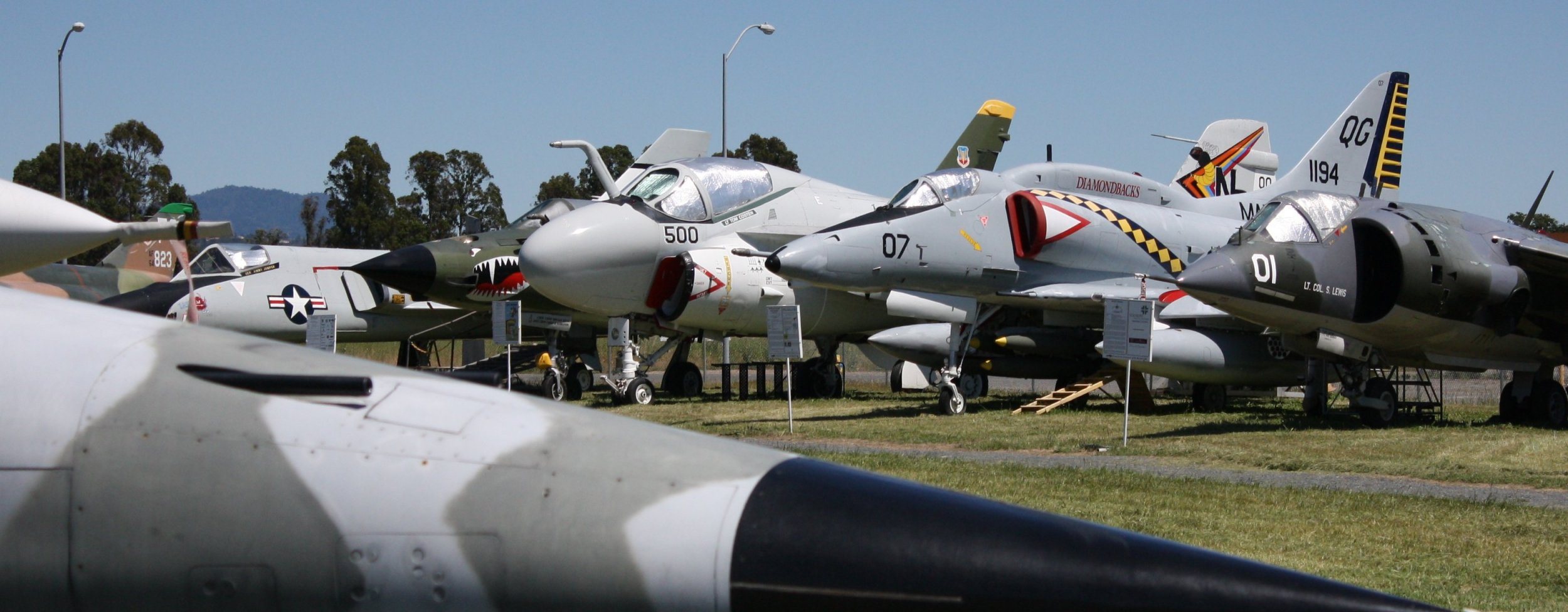
American military jet aircraft on display

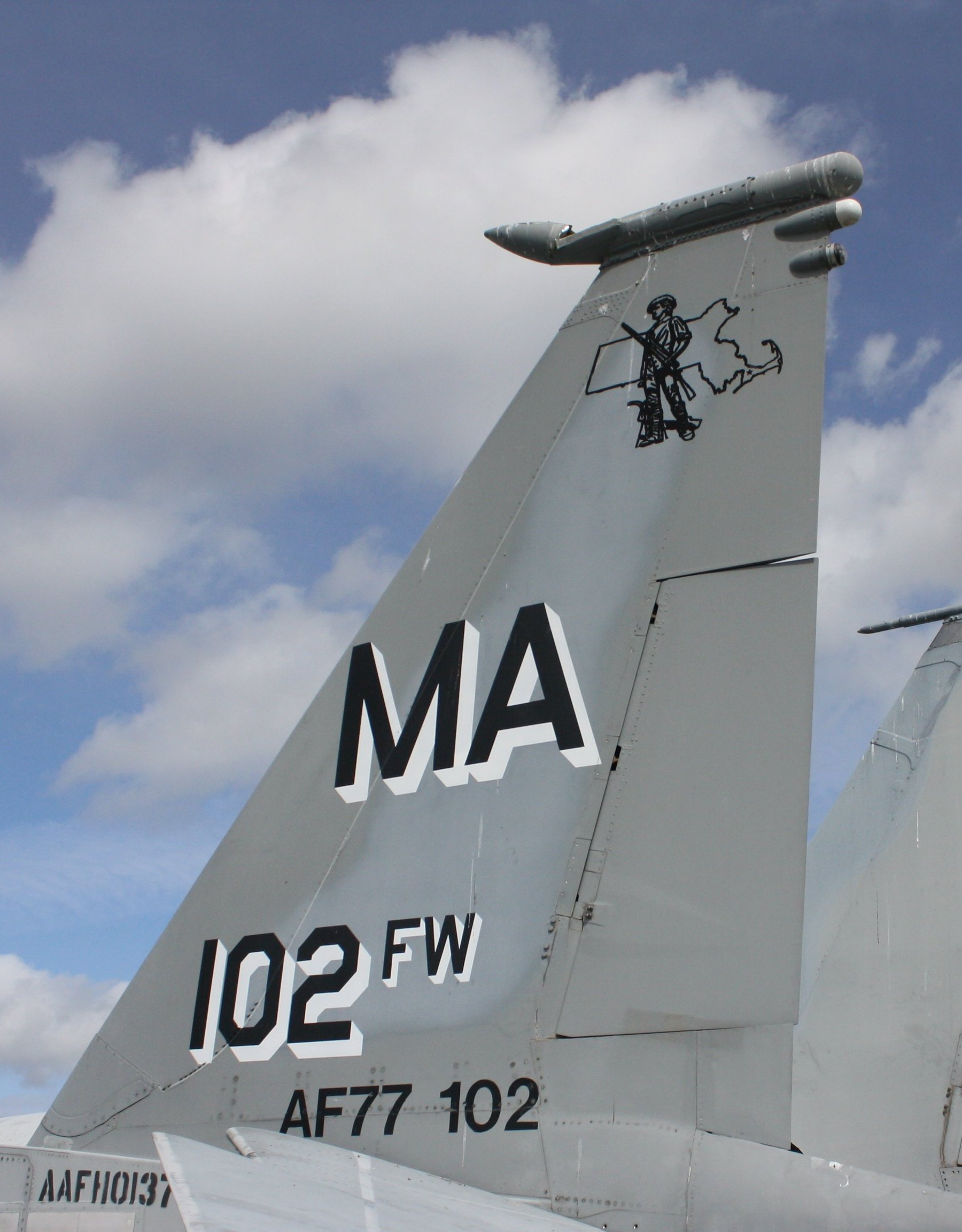
F-15 First Responder

=== Aircraft ===
- AgustaWestland AW109
- Beechcraft T-34B Mentor
- Bede BD-5J
- Bell UH-1H Iroquois
- Cessna T-37 Tweet
- Convair F-106A Delta Dart
- Douglas A-4E Skyhawk
- Douglas A-26C Invader
- Douglas C-118 Liftmaster
- General Dynamics F-16N Fighting Falcon
- Grumman A-6E Intruder
- Grumman C-1A Trader
- Grumman EA-6B Prowler
- Grumman F-14 Tomcat
- Grumman HU-16E Albatross
- Grumman S-2A Tracker
- Hawker Siddeley AV-8C Harrier
- Ilyushin Il-14
- Lockheed JetStar
- Lockheed T-33
- LTV A-7A Corsair II
- McDonnell F-4C Phantom II
- McDonnell Douglas F-15A Eagle
- McDonnell Douglas F/A-18A Hornet
- North American F-86H Sabre
- North American RF-86F Sabre
- North American T-2C Buckeye
- North American T-28C Trojan
- Northrop F-5E Tiger II
- Northrop T-38 Talon
- Pitts S-1 Special
- Republic F-84F Thunderstreak
- Republic F-105F Thunderchief
- Sikorsky CH-34C Choctaw
- Sikorsky SH-60F Seahawk
- Stinson 108 Voyager
- Vought F-8C Crusader

=== Other ===
- Lockheed D-21

== Events ==
Beginning in 1989, the museum held an annual 2-day weekend open house. By 2000, the event had become an airshow known as Wings Over Wine Country. It continued until 2020, when it was cancelled due to the inability to attract a demonstration team.

It currently holds a Wings and Wheels Car Show.

== Programs ==
The museum offers an aviation summer school, a merit badge in aviation program for Boy Scouts and an oral history program.

A division of the museum called Flight Wing maintains some of the aircraft in airworthy condition.
