= Western Express Air =

Regional airline in Bullhead City, Arizona

- Ceased operations: May 2007; 19 years ago
- Operating bases: Bullhead City, Arizona

Western Express Air was a regional airline in Bullhead City, Arizona that was owned and operated by Falcon Executive Aviation. It discontinued all scheduled operations at the end of May 2007.

== Destinations ==
- Arizona
  - Bullhead City (Bullhead City International Airport) Hub
  - ~~Mesa (Falcon Field)~~ (discontinued January 2007)
  - Phoenix (Phoenix Deer Valley Airport)
- California
  - Riverside (Riverside Municipal Airport)

== Fleet ==
- Cessna 208 Grand Caravan

== See also ==
- List of defunct airlines of the United States
