= Riverside Municipal Airport =

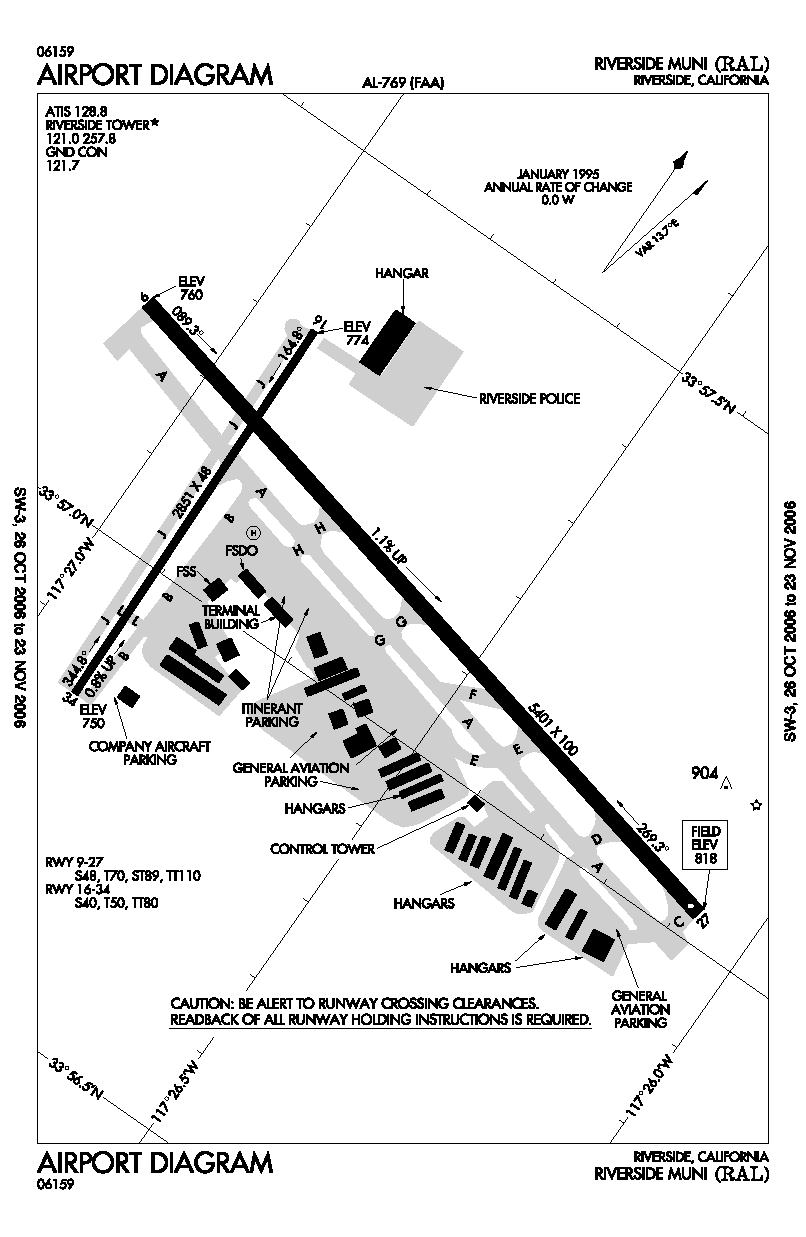
- IATA: RAL; ICAO: KRAL; FAA LID: RAL

Summary
- Airport type: Public
- Operator: City of Riverside
- Serves: Riverside-San Bernardino-Ontario Metropolitan Area
- Location: Riverside, California
- Elevation AMSL: 819 ft / 250 m
- Coordinates: 33°57′07″N 117°26′42″W
- Interactive map of Riverside Municipal Airport

Runways
Direction	Length		Surface
Direction	ft	m	Surface
9/27	5,401	1,646	Asphalt
16/34	2,850	869	Asphalt

Helipads
Number	Length		Surface
Number	ft	m	Surface
H1	60	18	Asphalt

Riverside Municipal Airport (Riverside Arlington Airport, decades ago) (IATA: RAL, ICAO: KRAL, FAA LID: RAL), is four miles (6 km) southwest of downtown Riverside, the county seat of Riverside County, California, United States.

Scheduled flights to Laughlin/Bullhead International Airport (Arizona) on Western Express Air ended when that airline ceased operations at the end of May 2007.

Runway 9/27 was paved about 1956 and Bonanza Air Lines appeared soon after; until 1969 it and successor Air West flew DC-3s and Fairchild F-27s to LAX, Las Vegas, Palm Springs and beyond. Golden West Airlines served Riverside in the 1970s with nonstop and direct de Havilland Canada DHC-6 Twin Otters to LAX.

Riverside Municipal Airport has been home to Civil Air Patrol Squadron 5 since 2005.

In 2013, FedEx Express, a cargo airline, donated a Boeing 727-200F to California Baptist University for its new aviation science program. The aircraft is on permanent display at the airport and provides a working laboratory for aviation science students. The aircraft, N266FE (cn 21672/1538), is a Boeing 727-233/Adv(F).

== Facilities ==
The airport covers 525 acres (212 ha) and has two runways and one helipad:

- 9/27: 5,401 x 100 ft. (1,646 x 30 m), asphalt
- 16/34: 2,850 x 48 ft. (869 x 15 m), asphalt
- H1: 60 x 60 ft. (18 x 18 m), asphalt

The runway has ILS, GPS, and VOR approaches.

Should there be plans to expand, the Airport's Master Plan supports lengthening runway 9/27 to 6,153 feet (1,875 m). Runway 27 has a Visual Approach Slope Indicator.

The crosswind runway, RWY 16-34, is suited for smaller aircraft. Runway 34 has a Precision Approach Path Indicator.

== General aviation ==
The airport is home to about 100 general aviation aircraft.

- FBOs:
  Riverside Air Service
- Airport businesses
  Capital Jet Management
