= Mendocino Transit Authority =

Coordinates: 39°06′43″N 123°11′36.4″W

- Headquarters: 241 Plant Road; Ukiah, California
- Locale: Mendocino County, California
- Service type: Bus service Dial-a-bus
- Routes: 9
- Website: mendocinotransit.org

The Mendocino Transit Authority (MTA) is a public bus system that serves Ukiah, the Mendocino Valley, and coastal regions of Mendocino County, California.

MTA began service in 1976 under a joint powers agreement between the County of Mendocino and the cities of Fort Bragg, Point Arena, Ukiah and Willits.

== Routes ==
MTA operates several routes, most of which radiate from Ukiah.

Route number	Name	Route description	Route deviation requests
1	Willits Rider		^
5	The BraggAbout	Local Service within Fort Bragg	^
7	Ukiah Valley Jitney	Mendocino College, Feedlot & Bush, Raley's, Grocery Outlet, Redwood Academy, Goodwill, Main & Standley (Library), Safeway, Public Health Department, Greyhound, Airport, Plant & South State	^
9	Ukiah Valley Local	Mendocino College, Feedlot & Bush, Ukiah High School, Walnut Village, North Bush at Low Gap, Main & Standley (Library), Pear Tree Center, Leslie Street, Yokayo Center, Wal-Mart/Food Maxx, Community Clinic, South Dora Street & Laws Ave, Plant Road & South State	^: Up to 3/4 mi after 6pm for additional fare
20	Inland Service	Willits to Ukiah	^
30	Inland Service	Redwood Valley to Ukiah	^
60	The Coaster	Service between Fort Bragg & Mendocino/Navarro River	^
65	CC Rider	Service between Mendocino, Fort Bragg, Willits, Ukiah & Santa Rosa	^: Stops can be made at the Sonoma County Airport SMART Train Station, The Sonoma County Airport, and the Santa Rosa [SRC] Amtrak Thruway stop at Coddingtown Mall, upon request for no additional fare
75	South Mendocino Coast Service	Gualala-Ukiah & Ft. Bragg	^
95	South Mendocino Coast Service	Point Arena - Santa Rosa	^: "Premium Stops" are made within a 2-mile radius of the Santa Rosa 2nd Avenue Transit Mall, upon request, for an additional $2 fare; Stops can be made at the Sonoma County Airport SMART Train Station, The Sonoma County Airport, and the Santa Rosa [SRC] Amtrak Thruway stop at Coddingtown Mall, upon request for no additional fare

^ All routes make "Flag Stops": at a safe location for the bus to pull out of traffic wave the bus down.

== Previous Routes ==
Route number	Name	Route description	Reason for discontinuation	Year Of discontinuation
15	Laytonville	Laytonville to Willits bus service	Low Ridership (5.2/hr.) and Low Farebox Return	Between 2009-2012
21	Inland Service	Willits to Ukiah Express		
30	Inland Service	Redwood Valley to Ukiah		Between 2009-2012

== Fares ==
Current fares are found at MTA's website.

MTA offers many pass and punch card options for frequent riders:

- 16 ride punch card - allows riders to ride through one or more fare zones for 1 punch per zone (~25 to 30% discount)
- 1, 2, and 3 zone full-fare monthly passes]
- Summer Youth Pass

MTA also provides the following discounts:

- ~50% fare for Seniors (62+) and People With Disabilities (With MTA discount ID)
- Free Local Fares for Mendocino College Students with Student ID
  - Discounted fares for regional routes 65, 95

== Previous Roster ==
Fleet number(s)	Thumbnail	Year	Manufacturer	Model	Engine	Transmission	Notes
24		1980	Gillig	Phantom 35' (35T96T6V92)	Detroit Diesel 6V92TA	Allison HT-740	Ex-Gillig prototype #2.
28		1982	Gillig	Phantom 35' (3596T6V92)	Detroit Diesel 6V92TA	Allison HT-740	
45			Carpenter	Coach RE	Detroit Diesel	Allison	
901-902		1996	Gillig	Phantom 35' (S50T3596)	Detroit Diesel Series 50		
903-905			Gillig	Phantom			
906-907		1999	Gillig	Phantom 40' (C20D096N4)	Detroit Diesel Series 50		906 was the last Phantom in Service at MTA and retired in 2020
908-909		1999	Gillig	Phantom 35' (C20B096N4)	Detroit Diesel Series 50		

== Current roster ==
This roster may be incomplete

Fleet number(s)	Thumbnail	Year	Manufacturer	Model	Engine	Transmission	Notes
619-628		2011, 2013			Glaval gas		-Paratransit/Dial-a-ride Vans -Planned to be replaced between 2022 and 2024
733-739		2016, 2018			Glaval gas		-Fixed Route Cutaway Buses -Planned to retire in 2022 and 2024
910-917		2012-2013	Gillig	Advantage			-Units 910-912 are planned to retire in 2023
