= Golden Pacific Airlines =

US regional airline

IATA	ICAO	Call sign
YB	GPA	GOLD PAC
- Founded: 1981; 45 years ago
- Ceased operations: 1989; 37 years ago
- Fleet size: 5
- Headquarters: Kingman, Arizona, United States

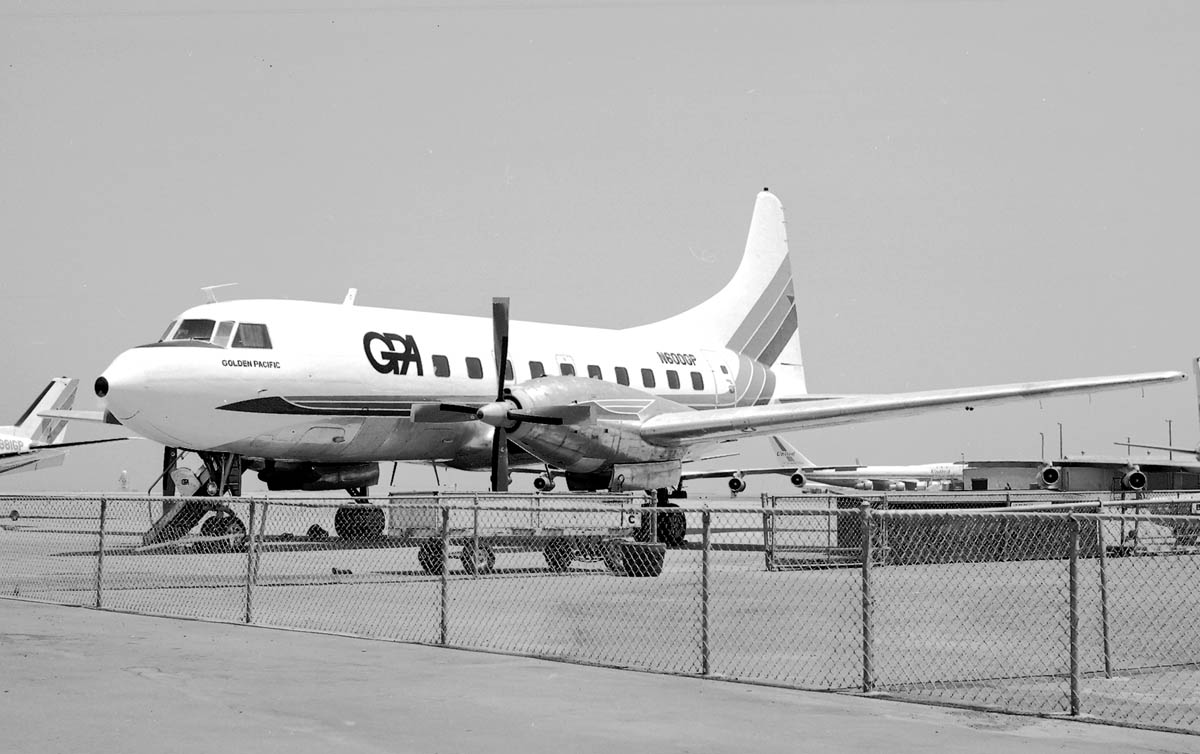
Convair 600 Golden Pacific Airlines

Golden Pacific Airlines, IATA YB (1981–1989) was a United States regional airline that operated primarily in Arizona. It was unrelated to the Golden Pacific Airlines of the 1970s.

== History ==
Golden Pacific Airlines (YB) was founded in 1981 in Kingman, Arizona and operated a fleet of 10 seat Cessna 402 aircraft under Part 135 of Federal Air Regulations. Designated an Essential Air Service provider under provisions of the 1979 Airline Deregulation Act the carrier was selected by the US Civil Aeronautics Board, in 1981, to replace Cochise Airlines in providing Air Service to Kingman and Prescott, AZ over a linear Phoenix-Prescott-Kingman-Las Vegas route. Points served subsequently expanded to include Phoenix to Sierra Vista/Fort Huachuca, Sedona and Winslow, AZ. Sold in 1987, the airline ceased operations in 1989 after it was unable to obtain 19-passenger Fairchild Metroliners to continue service.

== See also ==
- List of defunct airlines of the United States
