= Golden Pacific Airlines (1969–1973) =

- Commenced operations: 1969; 57 years ago
- Ceased operations: 1973; 53 years ago
- Headquarters: San Francisco, California, United States

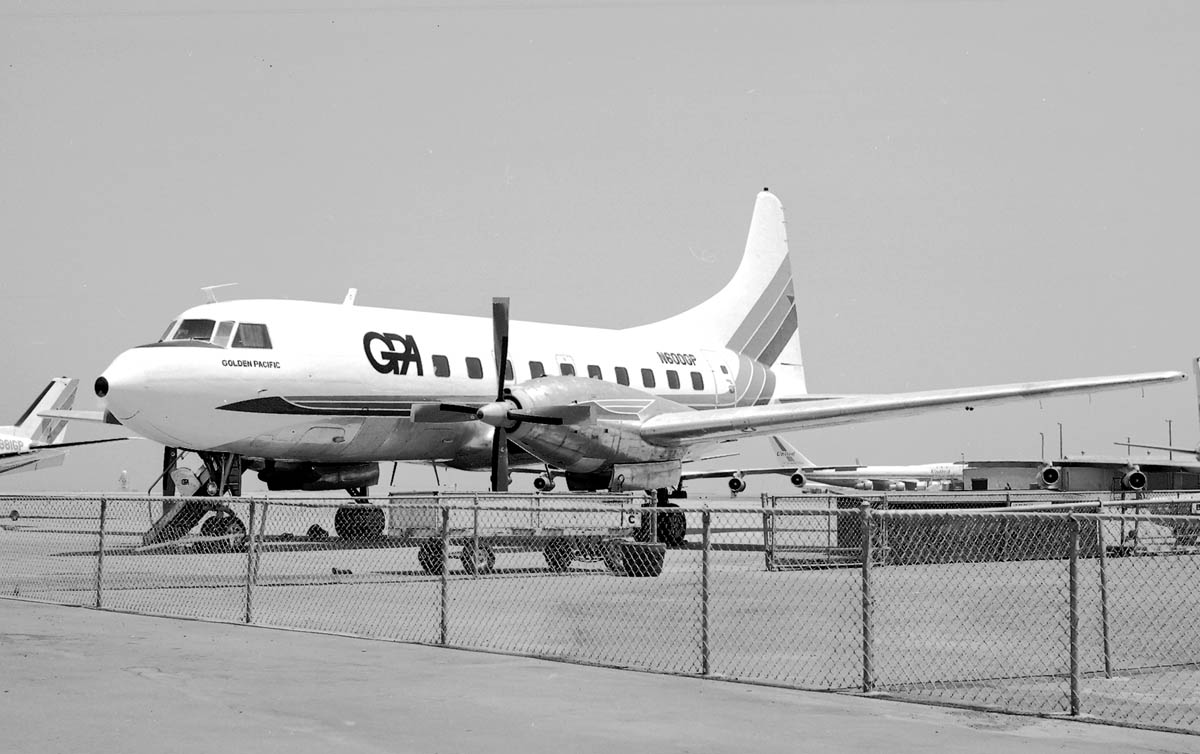
Convair 600 of Golden Pacific Airlines

Golden Pacific Airlines was a regional airline headquartered in San Francisco, California that operated flights to cities in the Redwood Empire and Central Valley between 1969 and 1973. It was founded by Floyd Braeseke, a former air force pilot.

Golden Pacific began service in March 1969 with flights from Ukiah and Santa Rosa to San Francisco International Airport. The airline served 15 cities by 1970, but was found by the California Public Utilities Commission to have operated at a loss for its first 16 months.

In 1972, Golden Pacific was reported to have sold four of its Beech 99 aircraft it had used on its scheduled northern California services, and was leasing two Twin Otters from Golden West Airlines pending approval from the Civil Aeronautics Board of an application to operate the Corvair 600. This application was denied later the same year.

== Destinations in 1969 ==
According to its September 1, 1969 timetable, Golden Pacific was serving the following destinations with scheduled passenger service as a commuter air carrier with all flights being operated with Beechcraft 99 commuter turboprop aircraft:

- Concord, CA (CCR)
- Eureka, CA (ACV)
- Fresno, CA (FAT)
- Lake Tahoe, CA (TVL)
- Merced, CA (MCE)
- Modesto, CA (MOD)
- Napa, CA (APC)
- Reno, NV (RNO)
- Sacramento, CA (SMF)
- San Francisco, CA (SFO) - Hub & airline headquarters
- San Jose, CA (SJC)
- Santa Rosa, CA (STS)
- Stockton, CA (SCK)
- Ukiah, CA (UKI)
- Visalia, CA (VIS)

== See also ==
- List of defunct airlines of the United States
- Media related to Golden Pacific Airlines at Wikimedia Commons
