= Sonoma County Airport =

Airport in Sonoma County, California, United States

Charles M. Schulz–Sonoma County Airport (former Santa Rosa Army Airfield)

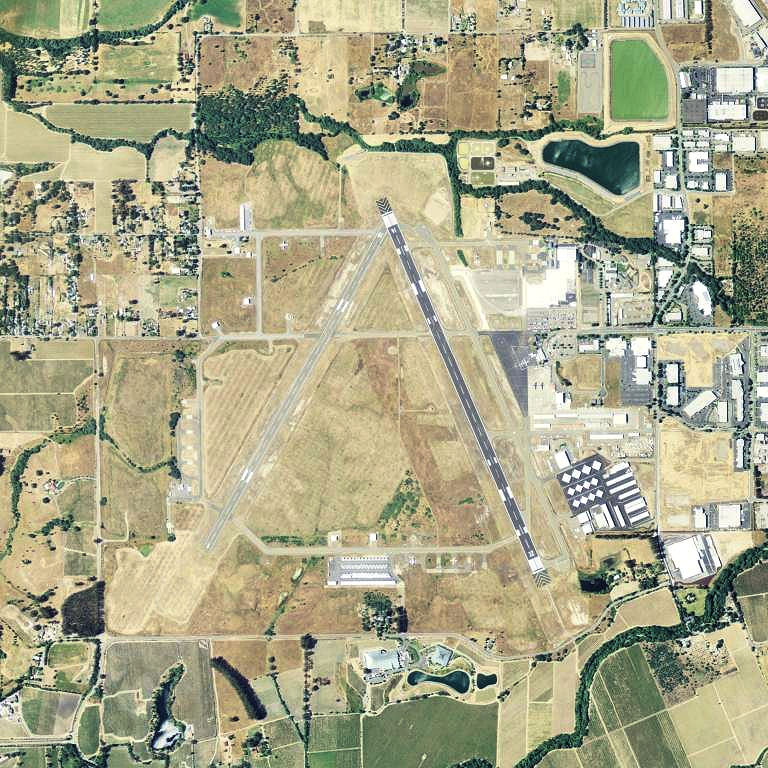
- USGS 2006 orthophoto
- IATA: STS; ICAO: KSTS; FAA LID: STS

Summary
- Airport type: Public
- Owner/Operator: Sonoma County DOT
- Serves: Sonoma County and the North Bay
- Location: Sonoma County, near Santa Rosa, California
- Opened: June 1942
- Elevation AMSL: 129 ft (39 m)
- Coordinates: 38°30′32″N 122°48′46″W
- Website: sonomacountyairport.org

Maps
- FAA airport diagram
- Interactive map of Charles M. Schulz–Sonoma County; Airport

Runways
Direction	Length		Surface
Direction	ft	m	Surface
02/20	5,202	1,586	Asphalt
14/32	6,000	1,829	Asphalt

Statistics (2025)
- Aircraft operations: 79,271
- Based aircraft: 334
- Total passengers: 780,637
- Source: Federal Aviation Administration

Charles M. Schulz–Sonoma County Airport (IATA: STS, ICAO: KSTS, FAA LID: STS), commonly referred to as Sonoma County Airport, is a county-owned public airport 7 miles (11 km) northwest of downtown Santa Rosa, in Sonoma County, California. It serves Sonoma County and the North Bay.

The county bought the site in 1939, and the United States Army Air Forces operated it as Santa Rosa Army Air Field, a fighter training base, from 1942 to 1946. Scheduled airline service began in 1947 and ran until 2001. After nearly six years with no service, Horizon Air returned in 2007. As of 2026 the airport is served by Alaska Airlines, American Airlines, Delta Connection and Southwest Airlines, and it handled about 780,000 passengers in 2025. A new terminal opened in 2022.

The Sonoma County Board of Supervisors renamed the airport in 2000 for Peanuts cartoonist Charles M. Schulz, a longtime Santa Rosa resident. Its logo shows Snoopy as the World War I Flying Ace atop his doghouse. The airport is also home to a CAL FIRE air attack base and the Pacific Coast Air Museum.

== History ==
=== Predecessor field and military use (1930s–1946) ===
In the 1930s Santa Rosa had a small municipal airfield owned by Richfield Oil Corporation next to the Redwood Highway about 6 miles southeast of the present airport. Use of the 3,000-foot sod runway at the earlier airfield was discontinued during World War II as facilities at the present airport improved.

In 1939 Sonoma County purchased 339 acres of farmland and began building a runway with a Civil Aeronautics Authority grant; the Army took over the field in 1942 and added 826 acres.

Opened in June 1942 and known as Santa Rosa Army Air Field, the airfield was assigned to Fourth Air Force as a group and replacement training airfield. Known units assigned to Santa Rosa were:

- 354th Fighter Group, March–June 1943
- 357th Fighter Group, June–August 1943
- 363d Fighter Group, August–October 1943
- 367th Fighter Group, October–December 1943

The 478th Fighter Group was permanently assigned to Santa Rosa in December 1943 and began training replacement pilots, who were sent to combat units overseas after graduation.

The airfield was inactivated on January 31, 1946 and turned over to the War Assets Administration for eventual conversion to a civil airport.

=== Early airline service (1946-1975) ===
The county resumed civilian operation of the airport in July 1946, and Southwest Airways flew the first scheduled commercial flight, a DC-3, in March 1947. From the late-1940s to the mid-1970s Southwest Airways and successors Pacific Air Lines, Air West and Hughes Airwest served Santa Rosa. Southwest Airways Douglas DC-3s followed by Pacific, Air West and Hughes Airwest Fairchild F-27 turboprops mainly flew to San Francisco (SFO). Pacific Air Lines had introduced F-27 aircraft on its Santa Rosa service by 1964 with these new propjets subsequently replacing the airline's Martin 4-0-4 piston-powered aircraft on all of its flights into the airport. In 1967 Pacific was operating daily F-27 service on a roundtrip routing of Portland, OR - Crescent City - Eureka/Arcata - Santa Rosa - San Francisco. By 1968, one of the Air West F-27 flights serving the airport was operating a daily southbound routing of Redding - Santa Rosa - Oakland - San Francisco. In the summer of 1972, Hughes Airwest was operating two nonstop F-27 flights every weekday to San Francisco. However, by 1975 Hughes Airwest was no longer serving Santa Rosa.

=== Commuter era (1969–2001) ===
Commuter airlines flew STS to San Francisco (SFO) until 2001 as well as to San Jose (SJC) at various times. In 1969 Golden Pacific Airlines (1969–1973) was operating six roundtrip flights every weekday between the airport and SFO as well as direct flights to Eureka, Lake Tahoe, Reno, Stockton and Ukiah with Beechcraft 99 commuter turboprops. During the mid and late 1970s Eureka Aero and successor Air Pacific (United States) operated de Havilland Canada DHC-6 Twin Otter service to Eureka, Oakland, Sacramento and San Francisco. In 1985 Westates Airlines Convair CV-580 turboprops flew nonstop to Los Angeles for several months before ceasing operations; their July 1985 timetable listed 38 round trips a week between STS and LAX. Other turboprop flights included American Eagle Fairchild Swearingen Metroliners operated by Wings West Airlines for American Airlines nonstop to SFO and San Jose (SJC). In late 1989 American Eagle had three Metros a day to SFO and four a day to SJC. In 1995 Reno Air Express was operating codeshare BAe Jetstream 31 nonstop service from Eureka/Arcata, Reno and San Jose flown by Mid Pacific Air on behalf of Reno Air.

In the mid-1980s United Airlines entered into a code sharing agreement with WestAir, a commuter airline that had previously served STS with Cessna 402s and de Havilland Canada DHC-6 Twin Otters to San Francisco. WestAir then began flying as United Express to SFO until 2001. Westair operated its United Express service with Embraer EMB-110 Bandeirante, Short 360, BAe Jetstream 31 and Embraer EMB-120 Brasilia turboprops. WestAir formerly operated as Stol Air Commuter flying Britten-Norman Islanders and Trislanders to San Francisco. Stol Air Commuter had administrative offices in Santa Rosa. Stol Air began scheduled service from STS in September 1972.

In 1989 jet service arrived in Santa Rosa when WestAir operating as United Express began flying four weekday BAe 146-200 nonstops to Los Angeles, soon replaced with Embraer EMB-120 Brasilia turboprops with this service to LAX then ending in 1991. The Westair BAe 146s were Santa Rosa's only jet flights until Allegiant Air jets appeared on May 19, 2016 followed by American Eagle on February 16, 2017.

In March 2000 the Sonoma County Board of Supervisors voted to rename the airport in honor of Peanuts cartoonist Charles M. Schulz, a longtime Santa Rosa resident.

In June 2001 United Express operated by SkyWest Airlines was the only airline serving Santa Rosa with six Embraer EMB-120 Brasilia flights a day into the airport including four daily nonstops from Los Angeles (LAX) and two flights a day from San Francisco (SFO). United Express then left Santa Rosa later in 2001 (and would not return until 2017) with the airport not having any scheduled passenger airline service from October 2001 until March 2007.

=== Return of service (2007–2015) ===
In March 2007 airline service resumed; Horizon Air, a subsidiary of Alaska Airlines, began flights to Seattle/Tacoma and Los Angeles operated with Bombardier Q400 propjets. Horizon then added flights to Portland, Oregon in late 2007, to Las Vegas in early 2008, and to San Diego on June 4, 2012.

In early 2011 Alaska Airlines announced it would retire its Horizon brand, and Horizon flights from Santa Rosa were rebranded as Alaska Airlines. In June 2012 the airline ended flights from STS to Las Vegas.

As part of an agreement between the airport, Alaska Airlines, and the local enotourism industry, it was announced in January 2012 that passengers were allowed to check a 12-bottle case of wine for free on all Alaska Airlines flights from the airport.

=== Jet expansion (2016–present) ===
In March 2016, Allegiant Air announced it would begin flying McDonnell Douglas MD-83s nonstop to Las Vegas McCarran International Airport and nonstop to Phoenix-Mesa Gateway Airport (IWA). The Las Vegas flight began on May 19, 2016 and the Phoenix flight several days later. At the time, the MD-83 was the largest airliner ever scheduled to Santa Rosa; as of October 19, 2016, Allegiant switched from the 166 seat MD-83 to the 155 seat Airbus A319. Allegiant ended flights to Phoenix-Mesa on January 2, 2017, and to Las Vegas on June 30, 2017, no longer serving Santa Rosa.

In October 2016, American Airlines announced it would begin nonstop service between Santa Rosa and its hub in Phoenix (PHX) on February 16, 2017. The daily code share flight was being operated by SkyWest Airlines as American Eagle with Canadair CRJ-700s. American Eagle then added a second nonstop CRJ-700 roundtrip flight to Phoenix. American Eagle announced it would begin flying Embraer 175s nonstop to Los Angeles (LAX) effective May 3, 2019 and nonstop to Dallas/Fort Worth (DFW) effective June 6, 2019. As of 2026, American operates nonstop jet flights to PHX with Airbus A319 mainline jets as well as with Embraer 175 regional jets in addition to seasonal nonstop A319 jet service to DFW from Santa Rosa.

In February 2017, United Express announced their return to Santa Rosa with thrice daily service to the United Airlines hub in San Francisco (SFO). The flights began on June 8, 2017; SkyWest Airlines Canadair CRJ-200s operated the code sharing flights for United. United Express announced it would begin nonstop CRJ-200 regional jet flights to Denver (DEN) on March 8, 2019. United suspended all service at the Sonoma County airport on November 1, 2020 due to the COVID-19 pandemic. While service was resumed temporarily to SFO on August 1, 2021, United indefinitely suspended all service to Santa Rosa (including United Express) on November 1, 2022.

In March 2017, Sun Country Airlines announced seasonal nonstop service between Santa Rosa and Minneapolis/St. Paul International Airport, to operate from late summer until late fall. Sun Country was operating weekly 162 seat Boeing 737-800s from August 24, 2017 through December 3, 2017, connecting via Minneapolis/St. Paul to Boston, New York John F. Kennedy Airport and Washington Reagan National Airport. Sun Country then continued to operate from the airport but had ended all service to Ronald Reagan Washington National Airport and was serving Washington Dulles Airport instead at the time. In May 2018 Sun Country Airlines made a surprise announcement that it would be adding a new seasonal destination from Santa Rosa with nonstop flights between STS and Las Vegas (LAS) in addition to its seasonal nonstop service between the airport and MSP. Sun Country flew Boeing 737-700s and 737-800s, which were the largest aircraft types serving the airport at the time. Sun Country ceased serving Santa Rosa in early 2020.

Avelo Airlines began nonstop service to Hollywood Burbank Airport on April 28, 2021, and later added Las Vegas, flying Boeing 737-700s and 737-800s; the 737-800 was then the largest aircraft in scheduled service at the airport. On May 1, 2024, Avelo opened an operating base at STS and added four western U.S. destinations. It closed the base and ended all Santa Rosa service on August 11, 2025.

Alaska Airlines retired its Q400 turboprops in January 2023; as of 2026 its Santa Rosa flights use Embraer E175 regional jets and mainline Boeing 737-800s. Alaska also began nonstop jet service to Burbank while Avelo still served the route.

Southwest Airlines began serving the airport on April 7, 2026 with nonstop Boeing 737 mainline jet flights to Burbank, CA, Denver, Las Vegas and San Diego.

== Facilities ==
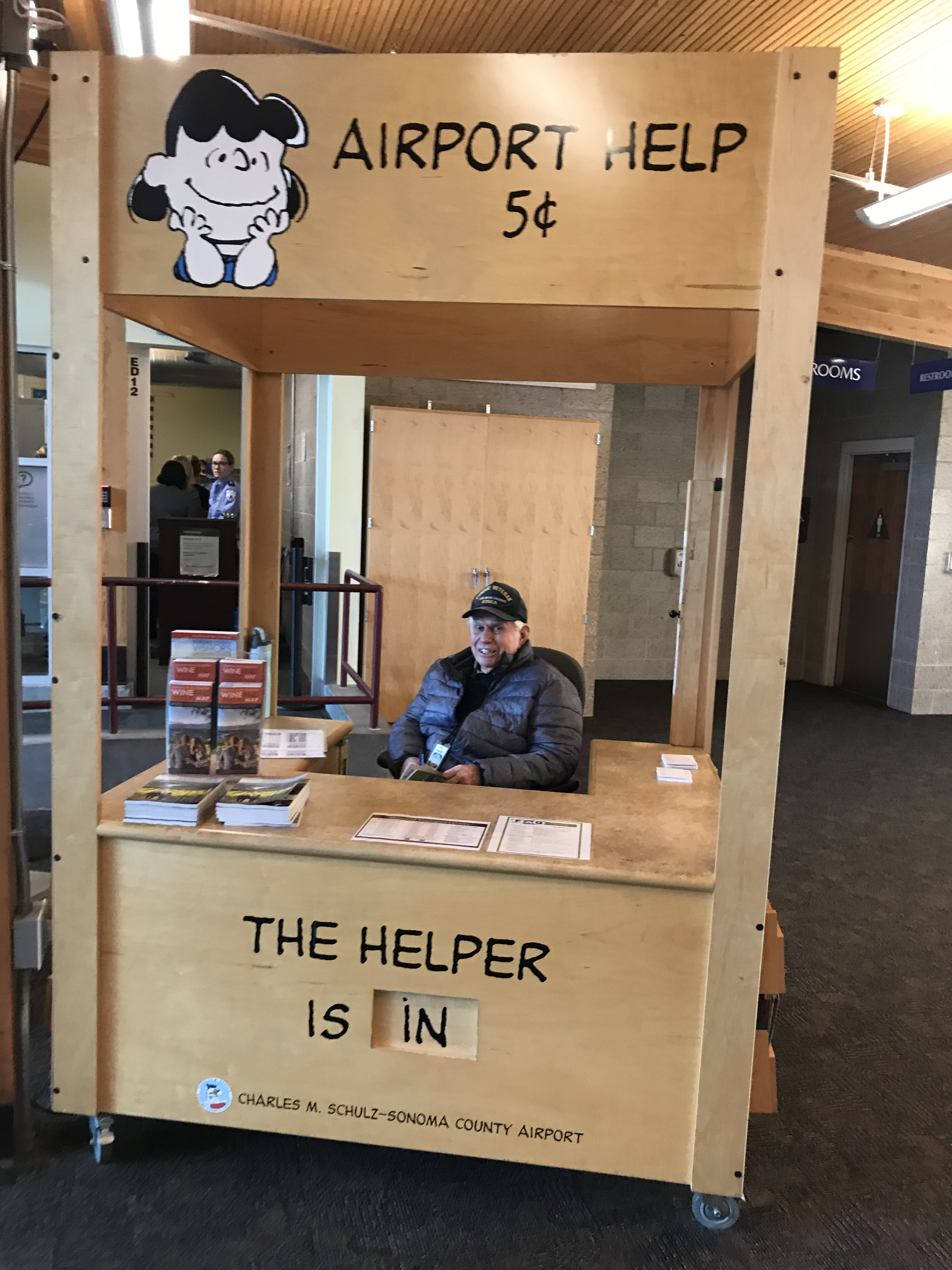
Information desk at airport terminal, a reference to Lucy van Pelt's Psychiatric Help booth

The airport covers 1,125 acres (455 ha) at an elevation of 129 feet (39 m). It has two asphalt runways: 02/20 is 5,202 by 100 feet (1,586 x 30 m) and 14/32 is 6,000 by 150 feet (1,829 x 46 m).

On September 15, 1974, the airport's main taxi runway was dedicated to and named after local pilot and businessman Lloyd C. Hayes, making it one of the rare instances where a U.S. airport taxiway was officially named after an individual.

In the year ending December 31, 2023 the airport had 82,710 aircraft operations, average 226 per day: 79% general aviation, 11% air taxi, 10% airline and <1% military. 334 aircraft were then based at this airport: 263 single-engine, 35 multi-engine, 22 jet, and 14 helicopter.

In August 2013 the airport began a project to separate the ends of its two runways and lengthen runway 14/32 by 885 feet to 6,000 feet and runway 02/20 by 200 feet to 5,202 feet. The work was completed in 2015.

Passenger growth in the late 2010s strained the old terminal. In October 2021 the airport opened a $4 million temporary structure as gate 2, doubling outbound seating and adding a second TSA screening lane with PreCheck. This has allowed the airport to double the area for outbound passenger seating, open a second passenger screening lane with TSA PreCheck capabilities, and it also replaced portable restrooms with permanent units.

A permanent terminal, first planned as a 19,000-square-foot, $20 million addition, was enlarged as traffic outpaced forecasts to a $31 million, 40,000-square-foot project (33,000 sq ft new and 7,000 sq ft renovated). However, as passenger growth surpassed projections, the project was expanded so that the new terminal would be 40,000 square feet (33,000 square feet of new space and 7,000 of renovated space) at a cost of $31 million. It broke ground in late 2020 and opened in November 2022, adding a new gate 1, a ticketing lobby, two baggage claim systems, concessions, an outdoor patio and space for two screening lanes. The overall modernization project was completed in August 2023.

== Ground transportation ==
The U.S. 101 freeway is accessible to the airport via Airport Boulevard. Both short-term and long-term parking is available. Long-term parking is split into two lots within walking distance to the north and southeast of the terminal.

A Sonoma–Marin Area Rail Transit (SMART) Airport station was constructed about 1.5 miles (2.4 km) from the airline passenger terminal on Airport Boulevard with shuttle buses connecting the two locations.

As of 2026 the airport is served by Sonoma County Transit bus route 62. In addition, Mendocino Transit Authority routes 65 and 95 have limited pickups, and drop-offs by request. Groome Transportation buses also connect the airport with the Oakland San Francisco Bay Airport and San Francisco International Airport.

=== Landline airside service ===
Airline shuttles
Operators	Destinations	Notes	Refs
The Landline Company	San Francisco	Passengers check bags and clear security at STS, and go directly to SFO's Gate A3 (International Terminal Boarding Area A airside) via motorcoach.	

The Landline Company is scheduled to begin eight daily nonstop motorcoach round trips between STS and San Francisco International Airport on November 17, 2026. Outbound passengers connecting to participating airlines check bags and clear TSA screening at STS and arrive airside at SFO's International Terminal Boarding Area A; return passengers board curbside outside security. Tickets are sold by Landline rather than the airlines.

The operation functions under an agreement where Landline pays standard airport fees to Sonoma County, and the local airport anticipates generating supplementary revenue from associated parking, facility leases, passenger fees, and terminal concessions.

== Airlines and destinations ==
=== Passenger ===
Airlines	Destinations
Alaska Airlines	Burbank, Las Vegas, Los Angeles, Orange County, Portland (OR), San Diego, Seattle/Tacoma; Seasonal: Boise, Palm Springs, Phoenix–Sky Harbor
American Airlines	Seasonal: Dallas/Fort Worth, Phoenix–Sky Harbor
American Eagle	Phoenix–Sky Harbor
Delta Connection	Salt Lake City
Southwest Airlines	Burbank, Denver, Las Vegas, San Diego; Seasonal: Austin

Destinations map
Destinations from Charles M. Schulz-Sonoma County Airport
(Red) = Year-round destination
(Green) = Seasonal destination
(Blue) = Future destination

== Statistics ==
=== Top destinations ===
Top routes from STS (September 2025 – August 2026)
Rank	Airport	Passengers	Carriers
1	San Diego, California	74,925	Alaska, Southwest
2	Seattle/Tacoma, Washington	59,777	Alaska
3	Burbank, California	51,406	Alaska, Southwest
4	Portland, Oregon	48,205	Alaska
5	Los Angeles, California	45,481	Alaska
6	Orange County, California	44,594	Alaska
7	Phoenix, Arizona	39,682	American
8	Las Vegas, Nevada	34,740	Alaska, Southwest
9	Dallas/Fort Worth, Texas	14,675	American
10	Palm Springs, California	7,053	Alaska

=== Airline market share ===
Largest airlines at STS (September 2025 – August 2026)
Rank	Airline	Passengers	Share
1	Alaska	649,324	75.3%
2	American	111,376	12.9%
3	Southwest	100,690	11.7%
4	United	453	0.1%
5	Silver	64	0.0%

=== Annual traffic ===
Annual passenger traffic at STS
Year	Passengers	Change
2025	780,637	

== Other operations ==
=== Sonoma Air Attack Base ===
The Sonoma Air Attack Base of the California Department of Forestry and Fire Protection (known as CDF or CAL FIRE) was established in 1964 at the northeast corner of the airport. Sonoma responds to an average of 300 calls per year. It has a battalion chief and a fire captain (air tactics group supervisors), a fire apparatus engineer (base manager) and six firefighters. Aircraft at Sonoma include one OV-10 Bronco (Air Attack 140) and two Grumman S-2 Tracker air tankers (classified as S-2Ts, Tankers 85 and 86.)

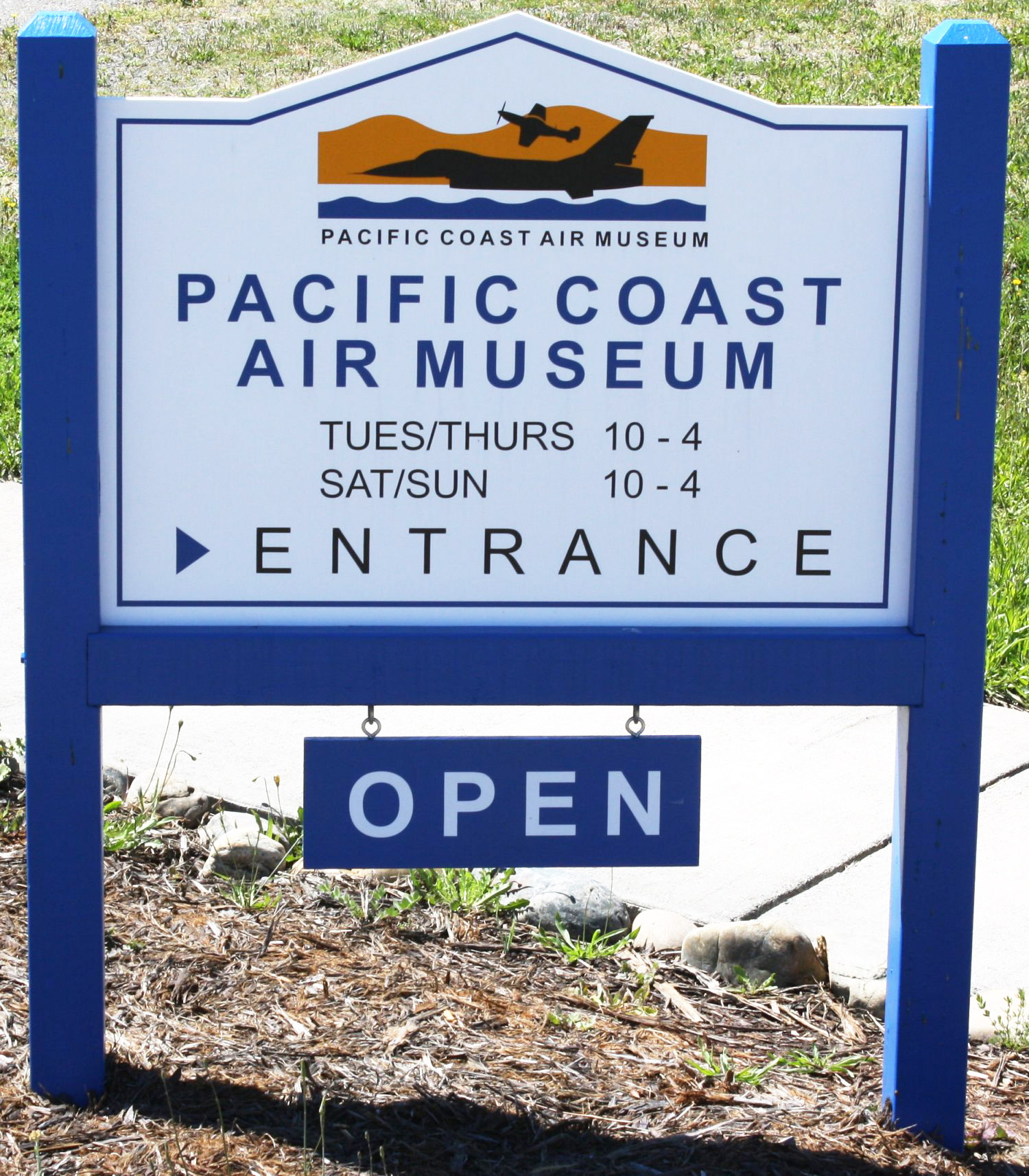
PCAM

On average, the base pumps about 300,000 US gallons (1,000 m^{3}) of retardant a year. With the base's pumps, four loading pits and equipment, Sonoma has a possible peak output of 120,000 US gallons (450 m^{3}) of retardant each day. The base's immediate response area covers 4,000 square miles (10,000 km^{2}) and includes Marin County and portions of the CDF Sonoma–Lake–Napa, Santa Clara, San Mateo–Santa Cruz, and Mendocino Units.

=== Pacific Coast Air Museum ===
The Pacific Coast Air Museum is at the southeast corner of the airport, next to the hangar used in the 1963 Hollywood all-star comedy movie, It's a Mad, Mad, Mad, Mad World. Known as the Butler Building, the hangar was built during World War II and is still in use.

== See also ==
- California World War II Army Airfields
- Wine tourism
