= Sonoma Skypark =

- IATA: none; ICAO: none; FAA LID: 0Q9

Summary
- Airport type: Public-use
- Owner: Sonoma Skypark, Inc.
- Serves: Sonoma, California
- Elevation AMSL: 29 ft / 9 m
- Coordinates: 38°15′27″N 122°26′03″W
- Website: SonomaSkypark.com

Map
- Location of airport in California

Runways
Direction	Length		Surface
Direction	ft	m	Surface
8/26	2,490	759	Asphalt

Statistics (2023)
- Aircraft operations (year ending 2/4/2023): 15,000
- Based aircraft: 62
- Source: Federal Aviation Administration.

Sonoma Skypark (FAA LID: 0Q9) is a public-use airport located three nautical miles (6 km) southeast of the central business district of Sonoma, a city in Sonoma County, California, United States. It is privately owned by Sonoma Skypark, Inc.

The airport opened on January 3, 1965 in Vineburg, Sonoma, California. It is 28.9 nmi (53.5 km) north of San Francisco city center.

Open to public use for light aircraft, the airfield offers various services, such as computer-based and in-flight training and self-serve 100LL aviation fuel.

The hangars shelter many antique and classic aircraft, including a 1947 Luscombe 8E (Silvaire), a 1941 Interstate S-1A Cadet, a Briegleb BG 7 glider, and a 1946 Aeronca Champion.

The airfield hosts a monthly Young Eagles Program, launched by the EAA in 1992 to give young people (from 8 to 17) an opportunity to fly in a general aviation airplane.

== Facilities and aircraft ==
Sonoma Skypark covers an area of 33 acres (13 ha) at an elevation of 29 feet (9 m) above mean sea level. It has one runway designated 8/26 with an asphalt surface measuring 2,490 by 40 feet (756 x 12 m).

For the 12-month period ending February 4, 2023, the airport had 15,000 general aviation aircraft operations, an average of 41 per day. At that time there were 62 aircraft based at this airport: 58 single-engine, 2 multi-engine, 1 helicopter, and 1 glider.

== See also ==
- List of airports in the San Francisco Bay area
- Other airfields in Sonoma County:
  - Sonoma Valley Airport (2.1 NM south)
  - Petaluma Municipal Airport (8.1 NM west)
  - Sonoma County Airport (KSTS) (23.2 NM northwest)
  - Healdsburg Municipal Airport (32.3 NM northwest)
