= Sonoma Valley Airport =

Airport in Sonoma, California

Sonoma Valley Airport Schellville Airport
- IATA: none; ICAO: none; FAA LID: 0Q3

Summary
- Airport type: Public
- Owner: Chris Prevost and Sheryl Carlucci
- Location: Sonoma, California
- Elevation AMSL: 10 ft / 3 m
- Coordinates: 38°13′23.8″N 122°26′52.00″W
- Website: www.sonomavalleyairport.com
- Interactive map of Sonoma Valley Airport

Runways
Direction	Length		Surface
Direction	ft	m	Surface
7/25	2,780	847	Asphalt
17/35	1,513	447	Asphalt
- Rwy 17/35 restricted

Sonoma Valley Airport (FAA LID: 0Q3) is a public-use airstrip founded in 1946 by Wally Reichelt in Sonoma, California, United States. Its first California-certificated runway opened in August 1959. Located 4.14 nmi (7.67 km) south of central district of Sonoma (4.76 mi, 7.67 km) and 26.9 nmi (49.8 km) north of San Francisco (30.94 mi, 49.8 km), the airfield offers two asphalt runways, of which the 17/35 is restricted, needing prior permission to use.

Open to public use for light aircraft, Sonoma Valley Airport does not allow ultralight and rotorcraft operations, except for MEDEVAC or law enforcement helicopters.

There are no night operations. Flying hours begin at morning civil twilight and end at evening civil twilight. Fuel is self-serve.

Among other fixed-wing aircraft, vintage planes can be seen on Sonoma Valley's apron, such as a fully restored, flying Curtiss P-40, a North American SNJ-4, three Boeing-Stearman PT-17 biplanes, a Globe Swift, a Cessna 195, a Douglas DC-3, a Dornier Do 27 or a Seabee amphibious. Others are being restored, like a Howard DGA-15.

On the airfield are the Vintage Aircraft Company, air tour operator, and the North Bay Air Museum, a flying museum. Vintage Aircraft offers flights in restored WWII open cockpit Stearmans and AT6 Texan.

The airport was threatened by the development of a fly fishing business next door in 2012.

== See also ==
- List of airports in the San Francisco Bay area
- Other airfields in Sonoma County:
  - Sonoma Skypark (0Q9) (2.1 nmi (3.9 km) S)
  - Petaluma Municipal Airport (O69) (7.7 nmi (14.3 km) E)
  - Sonoma County Airport (KSTS) (24.3 nmi (45.0 km) SE)
  - Healdsburg Municipal Airport (KHES) (33.4 nmi (61.9 km) SE)
