= O31 =

O31 may refer to:

- Douglas O-31, an observation aircraft of the United States Army Air Corps
- Healdsburg Municipal Airport, in Sonoma County, California, United States
- Otoyol 31, a motorway in Turkey
