= Monterey Bay Academy =

Location
- 783 San Andreas Road; La Selva Beach, California 95076-1911; U.S. 36.910113°N 121.837830°W

Information
- Type: Private parochial, Day & Boarding
- Motto: Where Land and Sea Unite to Inspire
- Denomination: Seventh-day Adventist Church
- Established: 1949
- Founder: Elder Leal V. Grunke
- Authority: Central California Conference, NAD
- Principal: Dan Nicola
- Faculty: 19
- Grades: 9-12
- Gender: Coeducational
- Enrollment: 210
- Campus: Coastal & Rural, 379 acres (1.53 km^{2})
- Color: Blue White
- Athletics: Mighty Cypress (varsity and junior varsity - flagball, volleyball, basketball, softball)
- Nickname: MBA
- Accreditation: WASC; AAA
- Newspaper: N/A
- Yearbook: Cypress Bough
- Website: http://www.montereybayacademy.org/

Monterey Bay Academy (MBA) is a private school in Santa Cruz County, California. It is a part of the Seventh-day Adventist education system, the world's second largest Christian school system.

== Description ==
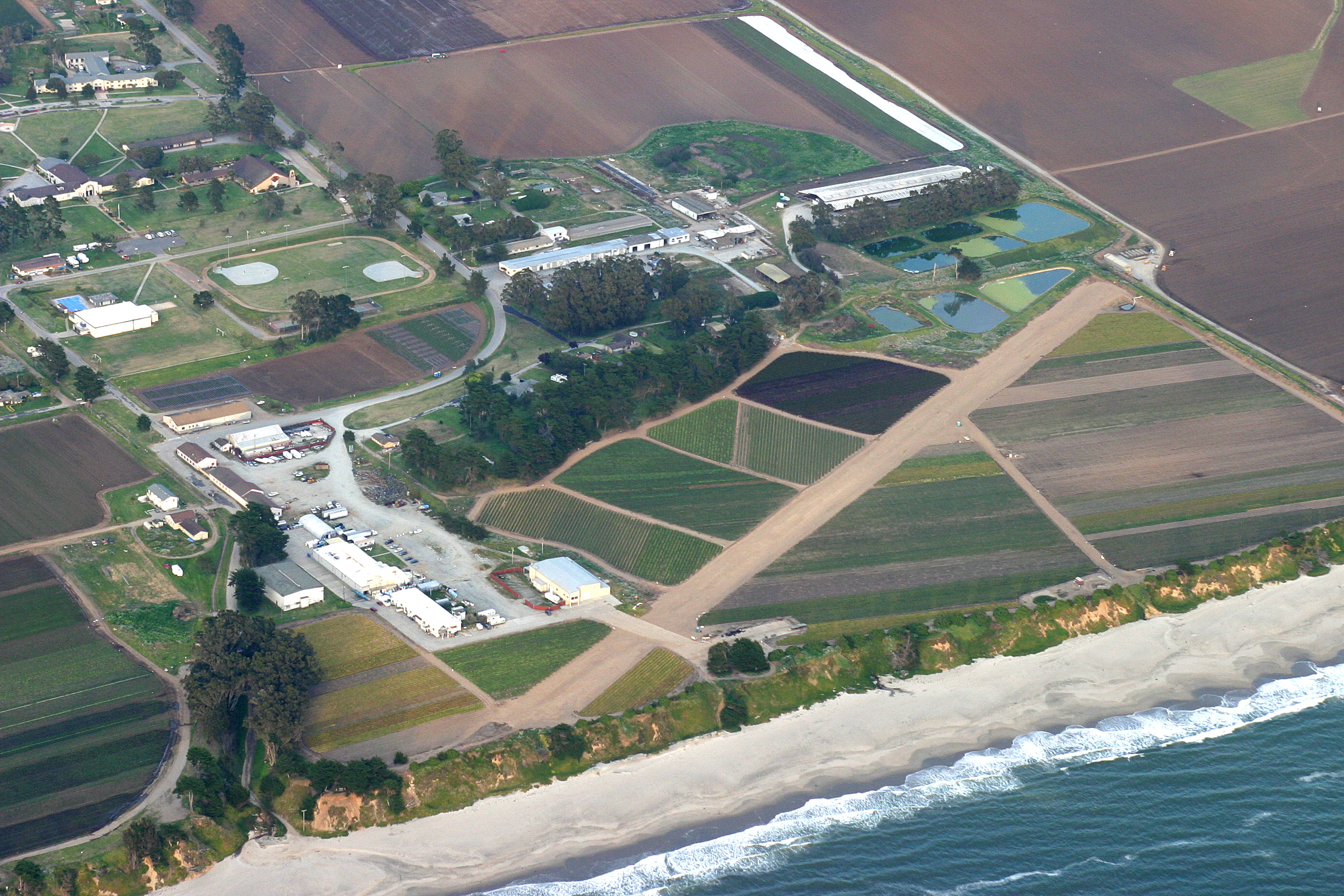
The campus airstrip from above

Monterey Bay Academy is located on 379 acres (153 ha) about 11 miles (18 km) southeast of Santa Cruz, California, on the edge of the community of La Selva Beach between Manresa State Beach to the north, and Sunset State Beach to the south. The campus is directly on a beach on central California's Monterey Bay, which is the Monterey Bay National Marine Sanctuary. The address is 783 San Andreas Road, west of Watsonville, California, and California State Route 1.

=== Type of school ===
MBA is a co-educational, Christian highschool for boarding and day students. The academic program is college preparatory, with seniors expected to be accepted into 4-year colleges. It is owned and operated by the Central California Conference of the Seventh-day Adventist Church, part of a network of more than 5,000 educational facilities.

Monterey Bay Academy is accredited by the Western Association of Schools and Colleges and the Adventist Accreditation Association.

=== Electives and activities ===
MBA offers elective classes in Aviation, EMR/EMT, Biology, Anatomy & Physiology, Woodworking, Auto Mechanics, Graphic Design, Photography, Robotics, and Studio Art and Advanced Placement classes in AP US History, AP Pre-Calculus, AP Calculus A/B, AP Statistics, AP Psychology, and AP English Language & Composition. Students may also earn certifications in Lifeguarding and SCUBA, as well as Google certification in Project Management, Data Analytics, IT Support, and Digital Marketing & E-Commerce. Offerings are based on the entrance requirements of the University of California.

Popular student activities are music, sports programs and extra-curricular trips and tours. MBA is a member of the California Interscholastic Federation (CIF), and competes in sports including soccer, basketball, volleyball, cross country, and golf. Many students are involved with student government, community service, or outreach projects.

Most students in the dormitory have a roommate and each dorm has at least two full-time adult supervisors.

== History of MBA ==
In 1938, the National Guard relocated the 250th Coast Artillery Regiment to the present MBA site. Named in memory of military chaplain Joseph P. McQuaide, Camp McQuaide was the coastal artillery training center for World War II and became the official stockade for army deserters. After ten years Camp McQuaide was decommissioned and considered surplus.

In 1948, the government tried unsuccessfully to sell the property to Santa Cruz County for $1 million as site of a junior college, and to the California Department of Parks and Recreation for a state park. Leal Grunke, a Seventh-day Adventist pastor from Chowchilla, California, was the procurement officer for the Central California Conference of Seventh-day Adventists. When he saw the location for the first time, he proposed using it for a boarding school. He met opposition from church officials, and then from the government. Grunke made several trips from Chowchilla to the War Assets Administration in San Francisco to meet with the general who was considering selling the property to private land developers. With the help of John P. Gifford of the United States Department of Education, Grunke convinced the War Assets Administration to give the land to the Seventh-day Adventist Church on August 13, 1948. No money was paid, not even the $1 million asked of Santa Cruz County earlier that year.

A condition was that the Church develop the school laid out in its proposal. Despite the pristine location, the remains of the camp included acres of cement and 600 old buildings. Monterey Bay Academy did not start out as an aesthetically pleasing campus. Despite being called "Grunke’s Folly", the school was established in 1949. The school's motto "Where land and sea unite to inspire", was created by Grunke's wife Ruth, while the school's name was chosen by Grunke.

Since 1949, Monterey Bay Academy served more than 8,000 students with 95% going to college. As a part of the world's largest Protestant school system MBA has grown and modernized. The grounds now include lawns, flower beds and Monterey pine and coastal Monterey cypress trees that frame views of the Pacific Ocean. The former military camp's runway was preserved as a strictly private use, dirt airstrip; however, in the beginning of 2013 the strip was restored, grass was planted on the runway, and was opened to the public using the name Monterey Bay Academy Airport.

== See also ==
- List of Seventh-day Adventist secondary schools
- Seventh-day Adventist education
- Santa Cruz County high schools
