= Watsonville Airport =

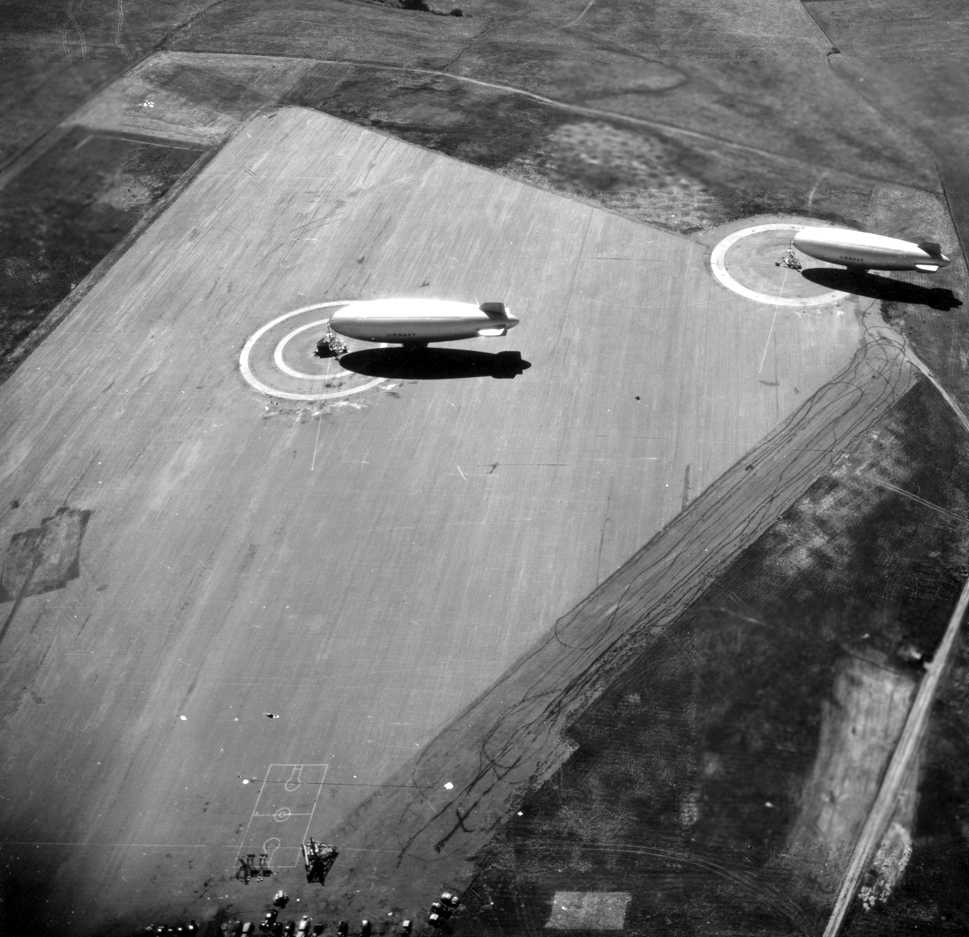
- Old Watsonville NAAF Airfield of US Navy in 1944 with antisubmarine blimps from Moffett Field

- Location within California
- 36°52′01″N 121°46′23″W
- Location: Watsonville, California

History
- Built: 1931 (closed 1946)

Site notes
- Area: 81 acres (33 ha)

Watsonville Airport was an airport in Watsonville, California, United States. It was used during World War II for antisubmarine blimps in the defense of California. Opened in 1930 by Watsonville Airport Incorporated, it was the city's first airport. Watsonville Airport Incorporated sold five thousand shares of stock to purchase 85 acres of land southwest of the city. The airport was built at California State Route 1 and Salinas road in Monterey County. The airport has three 2,300 feet dirt runways in a triangle shape. In 1930, Watsonville Airport Incorporated's first president was Harlow Ford, and Claude Wilson was the first airport manager and flight instructor.

== World War II ==
The US Navy leased the Watsonville Airport in 1942 and used it as an auxiliary field, called Watsonville NAAF (LTA). Antisubmarine blimps from Moffett Field were stationed at the Watsonville Airport, after the Attack on Pearl Harbor on December 7, 1941. The Navy paved the runways and built three blimp mooring circles. The Navy also built barracks for 166 troops stationed at the airport, and used the airport's existing 60 x 60 foot hangar.

One or two K-class blimps and a L-class blimp were based at the airport. The blimps departed in 12-hour shifts to look for submarines, give convoy support, and help in air-sea rescues.

At the end of the war in late 1945, the Navy closed the base there and returned the airport to Watsonville Airport Incorporated. It was renamed to Watsonville Airport No. 2, as the larger Watsonville Municipal Airport had opened three miles (5 km) northwest of Watsonville.

In 1947, Watsonville Airport Incorporated sold the land to Edwin and Flora Peterson. The land was turned into a cattle feed lot. There are no traces of the Watsonville Airport today.

== See also ==
- California during World War II
- List of airports of Santa Cruz County, California
- List of airports in the San Francisco Bay Area
