= KWVI =

KWVI may refer to:

- Watsonville Municipal Airport, California, United States, ICAO code KWVI
- KWVI (FM), a radio station licensed to Waverly, Iowa, United States
