= Santa Cruz Sky Park =

Former airport in Scotts Valley, California, United States

Santa Cruz Skypark
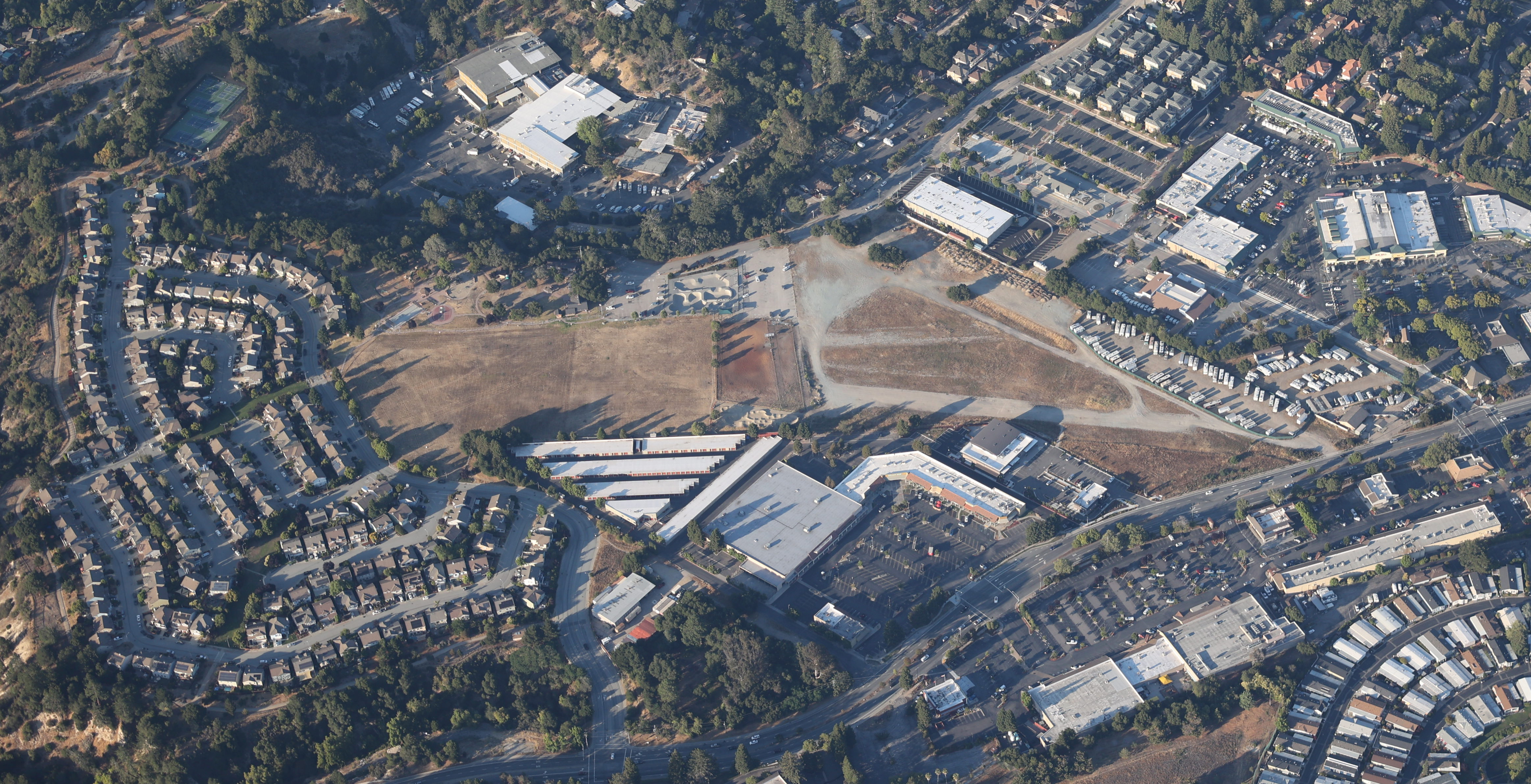
- Skypark area showing the remnants of the runways on the right, 2021

- Location within California
- 37°03′N 122°02′W

History
- Built: 1947 (closed 1983)

Site notes
- Architect(s): Jack and Lola Graham

Santa Cruz Skypark was an airport located in Scotts Valley, California, within Santa Cruz County.

== Historical timeline ==
2/1947
Skypark Airport, a private field built by Jack and Lola Graham on their property, begins operation in Scotts Valley. One of its primary purposes is to provide a facility for training of pilots under terms of the G.I. Bill.
2/1949
Jack Wilson and Wayne Voights were managers of Skypark Airport.
1954
Capitola Airport closes and most planes move to Santa Cruz Skypark.
5/1957
Santa Cruz Chamber of Commerce passes a resolution encouraging City to sell lands originally acquired for Swanton Airport and to use the money for acquisition and operation of Skypark. An accompanying study cites the advantages of Skypark. A heliport can be developed there to provide short-haul public transportation with connections to Watsonville Airport which can be expanded to meet the needs of the jet age.
8/1960
The City of Santa Cruz is again urged to acquire Skypark, this time in a citizens' group report called "Santa Cruz of Tomorrow". Reasons are stated why Watsonville Airport cannot adequately serve the needs of the Santa Cruz area. Realignment of the Skypark runway to add 500 feet is proposed.
7/1961
H.K. Friedland & Associates completes a Preliminary Airport Site Selection Study under contract to the City of Santa Cruz. Nine sites are examined. Skypark is deemed inadequate because many FAA criteria cannot be met and federal aid therefore would not be obtainable. A site on the Wilder Ranch, two miles west of the city limits, is selected as the optimum location.
8/1961
Santa Cruz Airport Commission in a report to the City Council disagrees with Friedland study recommendation. Commission instead notes that Skypark is for sale, that it is the best facility for airport purposes, and that "federal assistance is not practical nor necessary for the acquisition and development of an airport". The City—in cooperation with the County, if possible—is urged to acquire the Airport.
11/1961
Santa Cruz City Council requests the California Aeronautics Commission to grant waivers of certain Skypark deficiencies and, in the event the City and/or the County of Santa Cruz purchase the airport, to reissue an airport permit.
1/1962
Santa Cruz City Council approves a resolution to acquire Skypark.
10/1962
City Council approves agreement to purchase the 45.8 acre (185,000 m²) Skypark property from owner Jack Graham for $197,000 (equivalent to $2,100,000 in 2025). The agreement calls for an initial payment of $120,000, obtained as proceeds from the sale of Swanton tract airport property, for approximately 27.5 acres (111,000 m²) with additional land to be purchased with payments of about $10,000 per year to be spread over 8 years. The parcels not immediately acquired will be leased by the City for $100 per month until purchased. The existing lease between Graham and Russell and Esther Rice for operation of the airport will be honored by the City.
11/1962
State Division of Aeronautics reissues airport permit for Skypark.
10/1963
Santa Cruz City Council requests that the Skypark property be excluded from the proposed incorporation of Scotts Valley.
1/1964
Skypark property is annexed to the City of Santa Cruz.
1965
James Dahm takes over the Rices' lease for operation of Skypark.
6/1966
Master Plan of the Santa Cruz Municipal Airport (Skypark) is approved by Santa Cruz City Council.
7/1966
City of Santa Cruz requests $11,700 in federal aid for construction of a realigned runway and parallel taxiway at Skypark. Total project cost is estimated at $23,400.
8/1966
Federal Aviation Administration turns down Skypark grant application because the proposed construction would not meet federal standards:
- a 20:1 approach slope from the north is impossible unless the approach path is angled;
- 100' is required between runway and taxiway centerlines and only 85' is planned at the north end.
- a hangar is only 125' from the runway centerline (200' is minimum);
- terrain prevents extending the runway to more than 2,200' usable length, too short for Basic Utility II standards.
1966
City of Scotts Valley is incorporated.
3/1968
Lease agreement between City of Santa Cruz and James Dahm for operation of Skypark is signed. Lease is for 25 years.
10/1968
California Governor Ronald Reagan lands at Skypark prior to a meeting with the University of California Regents in Santa Cruz. Reagan is escorted from the airport under armed guard due to a bomb threat, later deemed not credible.
1968
Realigned runway at Skypark is constructed.
10/1975
County does a "Preliminary Initial Study" of Skypark to provide background for development of airport policies to be included in the County Regional Transportation Plan. The policy as ultimately adopted by the County Regional Transportation Commission recommends that Skypark remain a recreational airport operating at a level no greater than it then is.
2/7/1981
Apple Computer Co-Founder Steve Wozniak crashes his Beechcraft Bonanza A36TC on takeoff for a flight to San Diego at Skypark Airport with three passengers aboard. He suffers facial injuries and has temporary short-term memory loss for five weeks following the accident.
1/1983
Skypark closed.
10/1989
Following the 1989 Loma Prieta earthquake President George H. W. Bush lands at the former Santa Cruz Skypark site in Marine One to tour the damage to Santa Cruz.
3/1990
City of Scotts Valley publishes Environmental Impact Report by Earth Metrics analysing the Redevelopment Plan for Skypark.

== See also ==
- List of airports of Santa Cruz County
