= WVI =

WVI may refer to:

- World Vision International, an ecumenical Christian organization
- WVI, the IATA and FAA LID code for Watsonville Municipal Airport, California, United States
