= WestAir Commuter Airlines =

US regional airline (1986–1998)

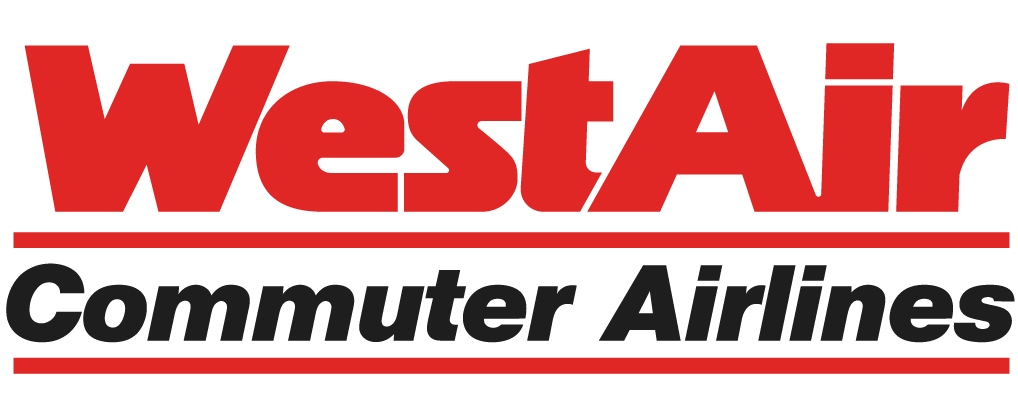
IATA	ICAO	Call sign
OE	SDU	SUNDANCE
- Founded: 1978; 48 years ago
- Ceased operations: 1998; 28 years ago
- Operating bases: Fresno, California
- Key people: Maurice J. Gallagher, Jr.

WestAir Commuter Airlines (IATA:OE, VB/ICAO WCA, SDU), was a U.S.-based regional airline formed when Stol Air Commuter changed its name in 1978 to WestAir Airlines; it was renamed WestAir Commuter Airlines in 1986. One of the founders was Maurice J. Gallagher, Jr., who later acquired Allegiant Air. On May 1, 1985 WestAir was one of the first two regional carriers to become a United Express air carrier via a code sharing agreement with United Airlines. It was headquartered in Fresno, California and was controlled by WestAir Holding, Inc. WestAir was sold to Mesa Air Group in 1992.

== History ==
Until 1979 Westair had been known as Stol Air Commuter, based in San Rafael, CA with administrative offices in Santa Rosa, CA. It had flown Britten-Norman BN-2 Islanders and Britten-Norman Trislanders. On becoming WestAir in 1978 the WestAir Group then bought Redding, California-based Golden Eagle Airlines, and WestAir began flying that airline's Cessna 402Cs.

Turboprop powered de Havilland Canada DHC-6 Twin Otters were added in 1982, Short 330s in 1984, Short 360s and Embraer EMB 110 Bandeirantes in 1985, Embraer EMB-120 Brasilias in 1987 and British Aerospace Jetstream 31s in 1989.

WestAir used three call signs: first was "Wescom", which lasted until the operation briefly expanded to the eastern US, where Air Wisconsin used the call sign "Wisconsin" and was frequently confused with "Wescom". This forced a change to "Shasta", which was frequently confused with "Cessna", so "Sundance" became the call sign until WestAir went out of business. The airline changed its IATA code from VB to OE in 1982-83 when VB became Pacific Express, a new startup all-jet airline. (The SDU ICAO code was retained). WestAir had hoped to acquire several regional jets, but none was chosen until 1987 when it placed an order for several BAe 146-200s to be delivered starting in 1988. North Pacific Airlines, another air carrier controlled by WestAir Holding that was established in 1987 and operating as United Express, was merged into WestAir in 1991.

WestAir became part of the Mesa Air Group in May 1992. Shortly afterwards, WestAir's handful of BAe 146s were disposed of in an attempt to dig the airline out of an economic hole. But United Airlines cancelled its United Express contract with the carrier, and on April 23, 1998 SkyWest Airlines replaced WestAir as United's west coast regional United Express carrier.

At the time of its demise, WestAir flew Brasilias and Jetstream J31s mainly from Los Angeles (LAX) and San Francisco (SFO) and from Seattle and Portland. Many of the Jetstreams ended up stored in Kingman, Arizona, where most remain today. The Brasilias went to Utah-based SkyWest, which flew most of them for many years before announcing that it would retire all its Brasilias in 2015.

== Destinations ==
Most of the following were served by WestAir's United Express service. Prior to becoming a United Express air carrier, WestAir was an independent airline and previously operated as Stol Air Commuter. Destinations in bold saw WestAir (United Express) BAe 146-200 jet service:

- **Arcata, California**
- Bakersfield, California
- Bellingham, Washington
- Boise, Idaho
- Carlsbad, California
- Chico, California
- Clear Lake, California - served by Stol Air Commuter
- Concord, California - served by Stol Air Commuter
- Crescent City, California
- El Centro, California
- Eugene, Oregon
- **Eureka, California** - served via Arcata, CA
- **Fresno, California**
- Inyokern, California
- Kalispell, Montana
- **Los Angeles, California**
- Marin County/Novato, California/San Rafael, California - served via Gnoss Field by Stol Air Commuter
- Medford, Oregon
- Merced, California
- Modesto, California
- **Monterey, California**
- Napa/Vallejo, California - served by Stol Air Commuter
- Oakland, California - served by Stol Air Commuter
- Orange County, California - Santa Ana, CA, now John Wayne Airport
- Oxnard, California
- Palmdale, California
- Palm Springs, California
- Pasco, Washington
- Portland, Oregon
- Redding, California
- Redmond, Oregon
- **Reno, Nevada**
- Sacramento, California
- San Diego, California
- **San Francisco, California**
- San Jose, California
- San Luis Obispo, California
- Santa Barbara, California
- Santa Maria, California
- **Santa Rosa, California**
- Seattle, Washington
- Spokane, Washington
- Stockton, California
- Telluride, Colorado
- Tucson, Arizona
- Ukiah, California - served by Stol Air Commuter
- Visalia, California
- Yakima, Washington

The timetables and Official Airline Guides refer to WestAir destinations before and during its operation as United Express. As United Express, the airline expanded via its code sharing agreement with United Airlines.

== Historical fleet ==
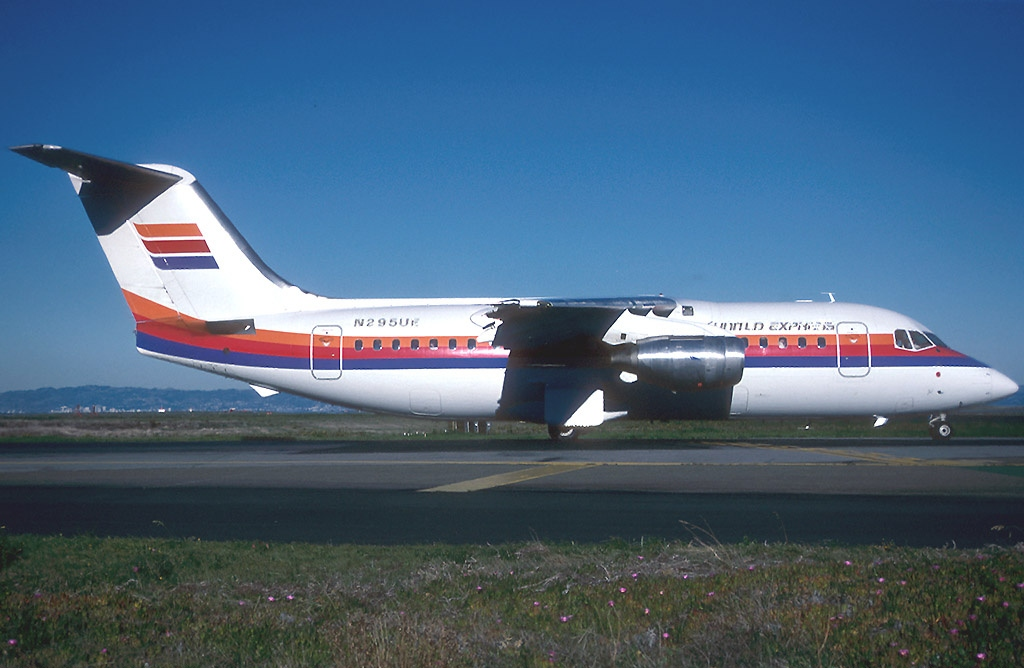
British Aerospace BAe 146-200 operated by WestAir as United Express

WestAir operated the following aircraft types at various times during its existence:

- 7 - British Aerospace BAe 146-200 (only jet type operated by WestAir)
- 47 - British Aerospace Jetstream 31
- 8 - Cessna 402
- 4 - de Havilland Canada DHC-6 Twin Otter
- 42 -Embraer EMB-110 Bandeirante
- 36 - Embraer EMB-120 Brasilia
- 4 - Short 330
- 7 - Short 360

WestAir predecessor Stol Air Commuter operated Britten-Norman BN-2 Islander and Britten-Norman BN-2A Trislander prop aircraft, both of which have STOL (short take-off and landing) capabilities.

== See also ==
- List of defunct airlines of the United States
