= KLVK =

KLVK may refer to:

- Livermore Municipal Airport, California, United States, ICAO code KLVK
- KLVK (FM), a K-Love radio station in Fountain Hills, Arizona, United States
