= Monterey Bay Academy Airport =

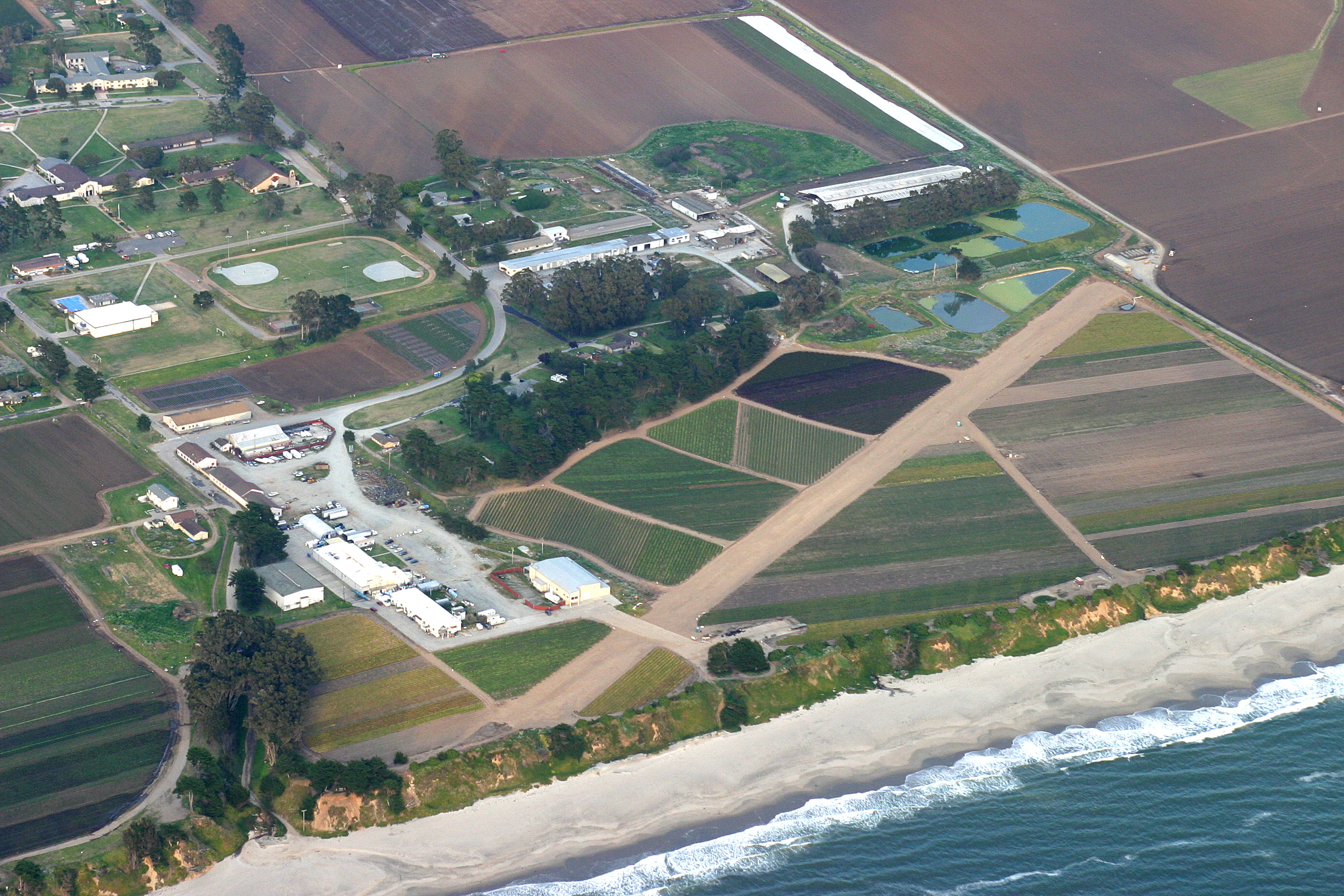
- Monterey Bay Academy Airport, prior to its conversion to a grass runway
- IATA: none; ICAO: none; FAA LID: CA66

Summary
- Airport type: Public
- Operator: Seventh-day Adventist Church
- Location: Monterey Bay Academy
- Elevation AMSL: 70 ft (21 m)
- Coordinates: 36°54′22″N 121°50′35″W
- Interactive map of Monterey Bay Academy Airport

Runways
Direction	Length		Surface
Direction	ft	m	Surface
10/28	2,200	671	Grass

Monterey Bay Academy Airport (

FAA LID: CA66) is a small daytime only airfield located near the city of Watsonville in Santa Cruz County, California, United States. This private-use airport is owned by the Seventh-day Adventist Church and is located on the campus of Monterey Bay Academy, previously the military installation Camp McQuaide. The grass airfield is currently managed by AirSpace Integration. Prior permission for use is required from the airport owner.

== History ==
Improvements and management of the airstrip were previously directed by Ocean Shore Aviation. The group restored the dirt strip, converting it from dirt into a grass runway. The group also secured a parking/tie-down area (paved with concrete), and has added a picnic area within walking distance to the parking/tie-down area overlooking the Pacific Ocean.

In the 1940s, a small aircraft landing strip was built at Camp McQuaide so airplanes could drop targets into the ocean. After the end of the war, in 1948, it was converted to the private boarding school Monterey Bay Academy.

Between 1980 and 1984 the airport was home to Pterodactyl Limited, which manufactured ultralight aircraft.

== See also ==
- List of airports of Santa Cruz County
- Seventh-day Adventist Church
