= Khes (disambiguation) =

Khes is a thin cotton blanket cloth.

Khes may also refer to:

- The name of letter Heth in Yiddish alphabet
- KHES, the code of the Healdsburg Municipal Airport, California, United States
