= VF-8 (1943–1945) =

Fighting Squadron 8
- Active: 1 June 1943 – 23 November 1945
- Country: United States
- Branch: United States Navy
- Part of: Inactive
- Nickname: Hellcats
- Aircraft: F6F-3/5 Hellcat
- Engagements: World War II

Fighting Squadron 8 or VF-8 was an aviation unit of the U.S. Navy, originally established on 1 June 1943, it was disestablished on 23 November 1945. It was the second US Navy squadron to be designated VF-8. The first VF-8 had been established in September 1941 and was disestablished on 28 August 1942, serving aboard USS Hornet (CV-8).

== History ==
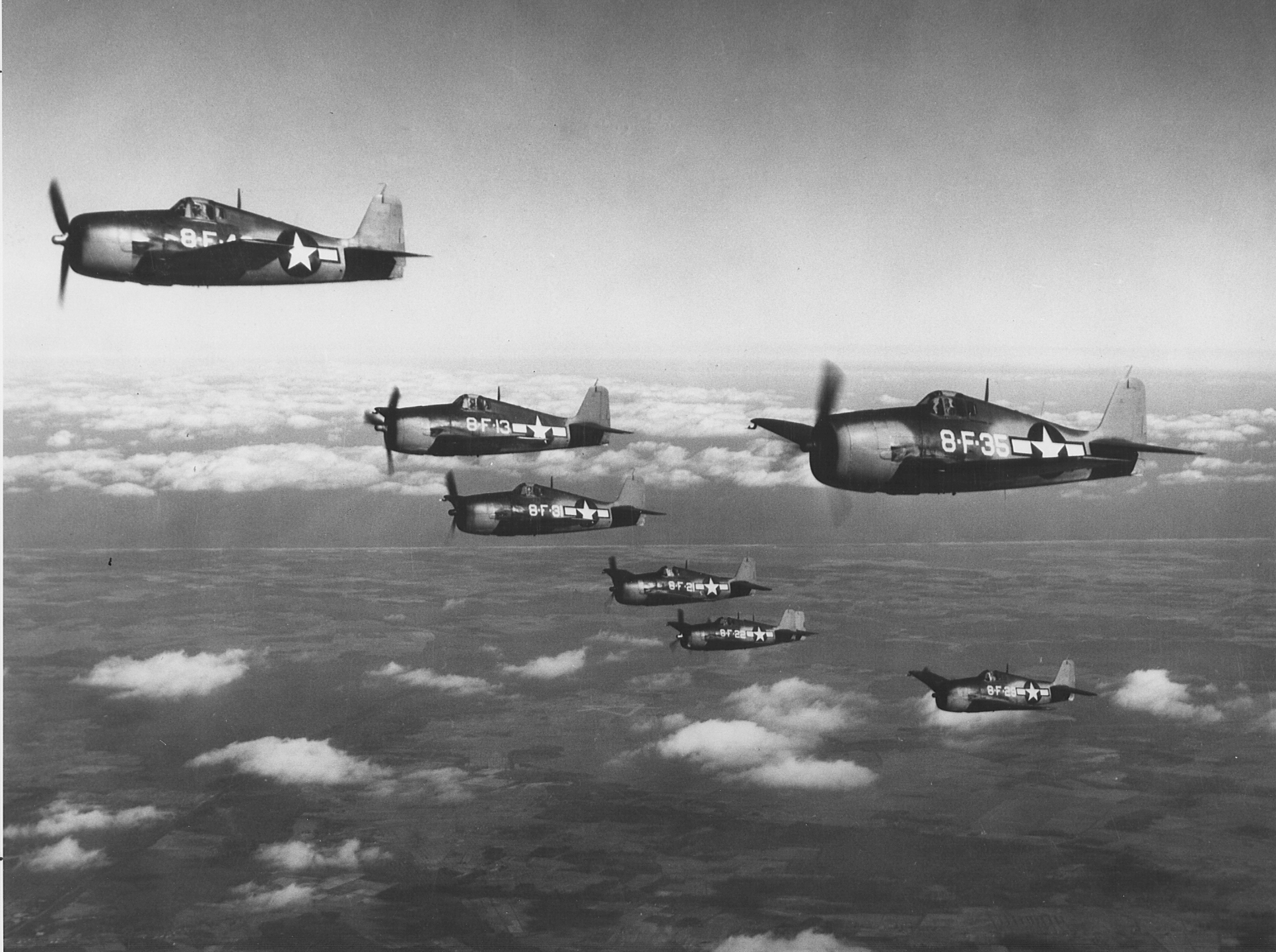
VF-8 F6F-3s in flight in 1943

VF-8 under the command of LCDR William M. Collins Jr. was initially assigned to the USS Intrepid during that ship's shakedown cruise in the Caribbean.

In March 1944 the squadron was deployed as part of Carrier Air Group 8 (CVG-8) aboard the USS Bunker Hill until October 1944. During this deployment VF-8 pilot LT Edward L. Feightner scored 5 victories, bringing his total score to 9.

From November 1944 to the end of January 1945 CVG-8 was shore-based at NAS Alameda. From February to mid-May CVG-8 was based at NAAS Watsonville. From late May to early August 1945 CVG-8 was based at NAS Puunene, Hawaii. By September 1945 CVG-8 was based on Saipan.

== Home port assignments ==
The squadron was assigned to three home ports:

- Naval Auxiliary Air Station Pungo
- NAS Alameda
- NAS Puunene

== Aircraft assignment ==
- F6F-3/5 Hellcat
