= Camp McQuaide =

- Location within California
- 36°54′36″N 121°50′16″W
- Location: Watsonville, California

History
- Built: 1938

Site notes
- Area: 664 acres (269 ha)
- Architect: US Army

Camp McQuaide is a former United States Army camp located near the city of Watsonville in Santa Cruz County, California, USA. After it was closed, it redeveloped into the Monterey Bay Academy and the airfield was reopened as the Monterey Bay Academy Airport.

== History ==
In 1926, the 250th Coast Artillery Regiment moved from Santa Cruz, California, to an area just east of the town of Capitola. Its camp was named for Major Joseph P. McQuaide, who was born in 1867 and graduated from Santa Clara University. He served as Chaplain of the California National Guard in the Spanish–American War and World War I, and died March 29, 1924. By 1938, noise from target practice annoyed Capitola residents, so a more remote place was found. 379 acres (1.53 km^{2}) were purchased farther south, on coastal farmland near the town of Watsonville. The Works Progress Administration built San Andreas road to the new site.

It became the training center of what was then the 250th Coast Artillery regiment. In September 1940, the regiment was called up for duty in Alaska. During World War II it returned for training in 1944, and then was deployed in Italy. The camp was used as a stockade for army deserters. The camp housed 2,000 military prisoners of war during the war. After the end of the war, in 1948, it was converted to the private boarding school Monterey Bay Academy.

== Capitola Airport ==
The Capitola Airport also called the Santa Cruz-Capitola Airport was opened in the 1920s with two unpaved runways. In the 1930s a third runway was added, the airport had two 2,500 foot runways and one 1,600 foot runway with a hangar at the north end of the airport. The US Army took over the landing strip during World War 2. The small aircraft landing strip was used so airplanes could drop targets into the ocean. After the war it returned to private use and was closed in 1954 by its owners Russell & Ester Rice. Most of the planes moved to the Santa Cruz Sky Park (SRU), in Scotts Valley, California, that closed in January 1983. Nothing of the Capitola Airport remains. The land is now housing.

== See also ==
- American Theater (1939–1945)
- California during World War II
- Desert Training Center
- Military history of the United States during World War II
- United States home front during World War II
