= Stol Air Commuter =

United States commuter airline, 1974–1979

Stol Air Commuter was a United States commuter airline that began service around 1974 (52 years ago). The air carrier was also known as STOL Air Commuter thus reflecting its use of STOL (short take-off and landing) aircraft. It served the San Francisco, California Bay Area, and northern California. The airline was based in San Rafael in Marin County north of the city of San Francisco and also had administrative offices located in Santa Rosa, CA at one point. Stol Air Commuter operated scheduled passenger air service connecting several cities in the San Francisco Bay Area as well as northern California with San Francisco International Airport (SFO). According to the airline's system timetable, in the spring of 1975 Stol Air Commuter was operating 66 daily flights serving SFO via United Airlines gate 10 at the airport.

In 1979 (47 years ago), Stol Air changed its name to WestAir Commuter Airlines. WestAir subsequently became a United Express carrier operating turboprop and jet aircraft on behalf of United Airlines via a code sharing agreement.

== Destinations in 1978 ==
- Clear Lake, California (1O2, Lampson Field)
- Concord, California (CCR, Buchanan Field)
- Napa/Vallejo, California (APC, Napa County Airport)
- Oakland, California (OAK, Oakland International Airport)
- San Francisco, California (SFO, San Francisco International Airport) - Hub
- San Rafael, California/Novato, California/Marin County, California (DVO, Gnoss Field, also known as Marin County Airport)
- Santa Rosa, California (STS, Sonoma County Airport)
- Ukiah, California (UKI, Ukiah Municipal Airport)

Destination information is taken from the Stol Air Commuter June 1, 1978 system timetable.

== Fleet ==
- Britten-Norman BN-2 Islander
- Britten-Norman BN-2A Trislander

The twin engine Islander and three engine Trislander are STOL (short take off and landing) capable aircraft. Stol Air Commuter was one of the few commuter airlines in the U.S. to operate the Trislander in scheduled passenger service.

== See also ==
- List of defunct airlines of the United States
