= La Selva Beach, California =

La Selva Beach
- census-designated place
- Location of La Selva Beach in Santa Cruz County, California.

- Position in California.
- Coordinates: 36°55′39″N 121°50′40″W
- Country: United States
- State: California
- County: Santa Cruz

Area
  - Total: 5.297 sq mi (13.719 km^{2})
  - Land: 5.297 sq mi (13.719 km^{2})
  - Water: 0 sq mi (0 km^{2}) 0%
- Elevation: 151 ft (46 m)

Population (2020)
  - Total: 2,531
  - Density: 477.8/sq mi (184.5/km^{2})
- Time zone: UTC-8 (Pacific (PST))
  - Summer (DST): UTC-7 (PDT)
- ZIP Code: 95076
- Area code: 831
- GNIS feature ID: 2583053

La Selva Beach (La Selva, Spanish for "The Forest") is a census-designated place (CDP) in Santa Cruz County, California, United States. La Selva Beach sits at an elevation of 151 feet (46 m). The 2020 United States census reported La Selva Beach's population was 2,531.

La Selva Beach is one of the several small communities located in and around Aptos. It neighbors Seascape to the north, Corralitos to the east, and Watsonville to the south. When founded, the small beach community was surrounded by dense conifer woods.

== Geography ==
La Selva Beach lies near the San Andreas Fault, and was close to the epicenter of the October 17, 1989 Loma Prieta earthquake.

According to the United States Census Bureau, the CDP covers an area of 5.3 square miles (13.7 km^{2}), all land.

== History ==
In 1925 it was founded as Rob Roy by real estate developer David Batchelor. The now-defunct (since 2000) Rob Roy Video Store was the only business in the area to make note of this heritage. In 1935 the name was changed to La Selva Beach by the new developer, Edward Burghard. Most of the existing houses were built in the early 1960s. In the 1970s the residents convinced state government to remove "Beach" from the direction signs. Officially the name is still La Selva Beach.

== Demographics ==
Historical population
| Census | Pop. | Note | %± |
|---|---|---|---|
| 2010 | 2,843 | | — |
| 2020 | 2,531 | | −11.0% |
U.S. Decennial Census; 1860–1870 1880-1890; 1900 1910 1920; 1930 1940 1950; 1960 1970 1980; 1990 2000 2010; 2020

La Selva Beach first appeared as a census designated place in the 2010 U.S. census.

=== Racial and ethnic composition ===
La Selva Beach CDP, California – Racial and ethnic composition Note: the US Census treats Hispanic/Latino as an ethnic category. This table excludes Latinos from the racial categories and assigns them to a separate category. Hispanics/Latinos may be of any race.
| Race / Ethnicity (NH = Non-Hispanic) | Pop 2010 | Pop 2020 | % 2010 | % 2020 |
|---|---|---|---|---|
| White alone (NH) | 2,226 | 1,899 | 78.30% | 75.03% |
| Black or African American alone (NH) | 21 | 9 | 0.74% | 0.36% |
| Native American or Alaska Native alone (NH) | 18 | 6 | 0.63% | 0.24% |
| Asian alone (NH) | 111 | 88 | 3.90% | 3.48% |
| Native Hawaiian or Pacific Islander alone (NH) | 3 | 0 | 0.11% | 0.00% |
| Other race alone (NH) | 7 | 3 | 0.25% | 0.12% |
| Mixed race or Multiracial (NH) | 85 | 137 | 2.99% | 5.41% |
| Hispanic or Latino (any race) | 372 | 389 | 13.08% | 15.37% |
| Total | 2,843 | 2,531 | 100.00% | 100.00% |

=== 2020 census ===
As of the 2020 census, La Selva Beach had a population of 2,531 and a population density of 477.8 inhabitants per square mile (184.5/km^{2}).

The age distribution was 16.0% under the age of 18, 5.2% aged 18 to 24, 19.8% aged 25 to 44, 28.8% aged 45 to 64, and 30.1% who were 65 years of age or older. The median age was 53.9 years. For every 100 females, there were 88.9 males, and for every 100 females age 18 and over, there were 89.4 males age 18 and over.

There were 1,047 households, of which 22.6% had children under the age of 18 living in them. Of all households, 53.3% were married-couple households, 6.9% were cohabiting couple households, 15.5% were households with a male householder and no spouse or partner present, and 24.4% were households with a female householder and no spouse or partner present. About 23.4% of all households were made up of individuals, and 11.8% had someone living alone who was 65 years of age or older. The average household size was 2.41. There were 714 families (68.2% of all households).

There were 1,393 housing units at an average density of 263.0 units per square mile (101.5 units/km^{2}), of which 1,047 (75.2%) were occupied. Of occupied units, 70.0% were owner-occupied and 30.0% were occupied by renters. Of all housing units, 24.8% were vacant. The homeowner vacancy rate was 0.7%, and the rental vacancy rate was 17.0%.

The census reported that 99.5% of the population lived in households, 0.5% lived in non-institutionalized group quarters, and 0.0% were institutionalized. 75.3% of residents lived in urban areas, while 24.7% lived in rural areas.

=== Income and poverty ===
In 2023, the US Census Bureau estimated that the median household income in 2023 was $159,094, and the per capita income was $77,290.

== Parks and recreation ==
La Selva Beach is adjacent to Manresa State Beach where one can fish, surf, and boogie board. These breaks are not as popular as others in Santa Cruz County.

The central park of La Selva Beach is Triangle Park. The park is triangular in form and enhanced by a triangular structure with the flags of the world. There is also a horseshoe pit.

In the summer, one can witness children practicing their baton-twirling/hurling skills and building floats, while their parents practice library push-cart choreography in preparation for the La Selva Beach 4th of July Parade. This parade is shorter but less known than the so-called "World's Shortest Parade" which takes place concurrently in Aptos, California.

== Education ==
Rio del Mar Elementary school and the Monterey Bay Academy are the nearest educational institutions. The Aptos Academy was a private school in the area from 1999 through June 2013.

== Notable residents ==
- Aaron Bates, professional baseball player.
- Don Bunce, Star Rose Bowl quarterback and orthopedic surgeon.
- Jason Jessee, professional skateboarder.
