= Ukiah Municipal Airport =

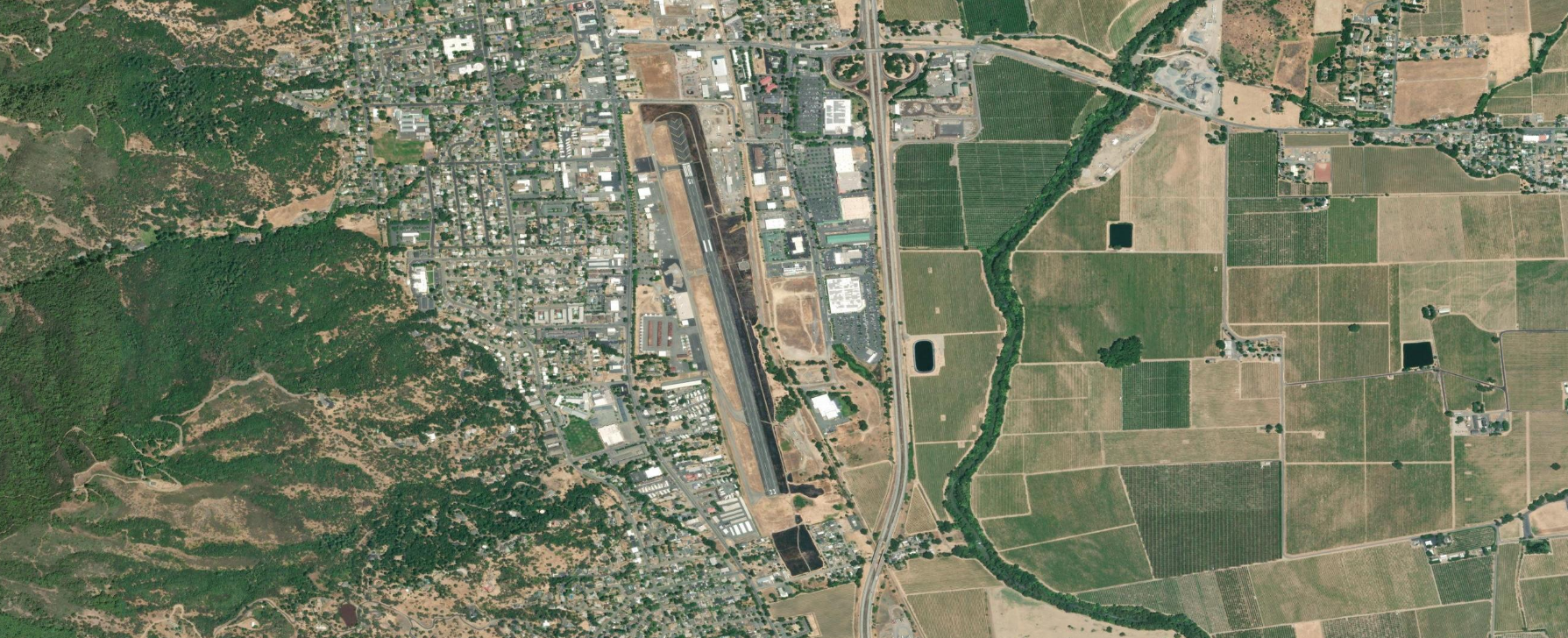
- IATA: UKI; ICAO: KUKI; FAA LID: UKI

Summary
- Airport type: Public
- Operator: City of Ukiah
- Location: Ukiah, California
- Elevation AMSL: 614 ft (187 m)
- Coordinates: 39°07′33″N 123°12′03″W
- Interactive map of Ukiah Municipal Airport

Runways
Direction	Length		Surface
Direction	ft	m	Surface
15/33	4,415	1,346	Asphalt

Ukiah Municipal Airport (IATA: UKI, ICAO: KUKI, FAA LID: UKI) is a public airport located one mile (1.6 km) south of Ukiah, serving Mendocino County, California, United States. This general aviation airport covers 160 acres (65 ha) and has one runway.

== Airlines and destinations ==
=== Cargo ===
The following airlines offer scheduled cargo service:

Airlines	Destinations
FedEx Feeder	Sacramento

== Past passenger airline service ==
Ukiah was served by Pacific Air Lines until the early 1960s with Douglas DC-3 aircraft with direct service to San Francisco International Airport (SFO) via an intermediate stop at Santa Rosa (STS). Northbound DC-3 service operated by Pacific was flown from the airport to Eureka/Arcata (ACV), Crescent City (CEC) and Medford, OR (MFR).

Stol Air Commuter served Ukiah during the 1970s with nonstop service to San Francisco International Airport which was operated with Britten-Norman Islander and Trislander STOL (short take off and landing) capable aircraft.

== CalFire Airbase ==
Staffing at the base consists of one battalion chief and one fire captain (air tactics group supervisors), one fire apparatus engineer (base manager), and several firefighters. The complement of aircraft located at Ukiah includes one OV-10 Bronco (Air Attack 110) and two Grumman S-2 Tracker air tankers (classified as S-2Ts, Tankers 90 and 91.)

== CALSTAR ==
CALSTAR (California Shock Trauma Air Rescue) is a nonprofit regional air ambulance company serving California and northern Nevada. It is currently the largest nonprofit air ambulance provider on the West Coast. CALSTAR 4 is based at the airport.
