= 250th Coast Artillery (United States) =

250th Coast Artillery Regiment
- Active: 1924 – 1944
- Country: United States
- Branch: Army
- Type: Coast artillery
- Role: Tractor drawn mobile coastal artillery
- Size: Regiment
- Motto(s): Rien Apas Beau (Nothing is in Vain)
- Mascot(s): Oozlefinch

The 250th Coast Artillery Regiment was a Coast Artillery Corps regiment in the California National Guard. It served in Alaska in World War II.

== History ==
The 250th Coast Artillery was organized in 1924 as a tractor-drawn coast artillery regiment in the California National Guard. In November 1924 part of the regiment was redesignated as elements of the 251st Coast Artillery Regiment (HD). In May 1944 the regiment was converted to three field artillery battalions as part of an Army-wide reorganization.

Organized in 1924 by redesignating the 250th Artillery, Coast Artillery Corps, California National Guard as the 250th Coast Artillery (Tractor Drawn) (TD) Regiment. Its main armory was in the Mission District of San Francisco. The regiment was initially armed with 24 155 mm M1918 guns on mobile mounts in six batteries of four guns each, and may have received the 155 mm M1 gun during World War II.

On 16 September 1940 the regiment was inducted into federal service at San Francisco, and moved to Camp McQuaide, California on 23 September 1940.

Moved to Alaska via Seattle port of embarkation 19 September 1941. Elements of the regiment were assigned to harbor defense commands at Kodiak Island, Dutch Harbor, and Sitka, Alaska.

On 16 March 1943 the regiment was withdrawn from Alaska, arriving at Seattle 21 March 1943 and Fort Lewis, Washington the next day. It is likely that during this period the regiment was assigned to or available to the Western Defense Command for defense of the United States. On 7 February 1944 the regiment was transferred to Camp Gruber, Oklahoma.

On 18 May 1944 the regiment was inactivated and broken up. The regimental Headquarters and Headquarters Battery (HHB) became HHB 250th Field Artillery Group and 1st-3rd battalions became the 535th, 536th, and 537th Field Artillery Battalions, respectively. The 535th and 536th were initially armed with twelve 155 mm M1 guns each, rearmed with twelve 8-inch howitzers in late 1944. The 535th was deployed to Europe, arriving in France on 3 January 1945 and returning to New York for demobilization on 27 November 1945. The 536th was deployed to Italy, arriving there on 1 March 1945. The 537th did not complete organization until 16 October 1944, and was redesignated on 5 July 1945 as the 537th Chemical Mortar Battalion armed with 4.2-inch mortars, which remained at Camp Gruber until demobilized on 8 September 1945. The 250th Field Artillery Group was deployed to Europe, arriving in France 11 March 1945 and in Germany 31 March 1945. The group returned to New York for demobilization 14 November 1945.

== Lineage ==
The lineage of the 250th Coast Artillery traces back to the 1st California Infantry Regiment, which served in the American Civil War. The regiment's lineage continued with the formation of the Coast Artillery Corps (CAC), California National Guard (CANG) on 19 April 1909. Subsequently, this unit was redesignated as the 1st Coast Defense Command (CDC) (1917), 1st Provisional Battalion, CAC, CANG (date unknown), 1st CDC (1921), and 250th Coast Artillery (1923).

== Campaign streamers ==
World War II

- Pacific theater without inscription

== See also ==
- Seacoast defense in the United States
- United States Army Coast Artillery Corps
- Harbor Defense Command
