= Livermore Municipal Airport =

Airport in Alameda County, California

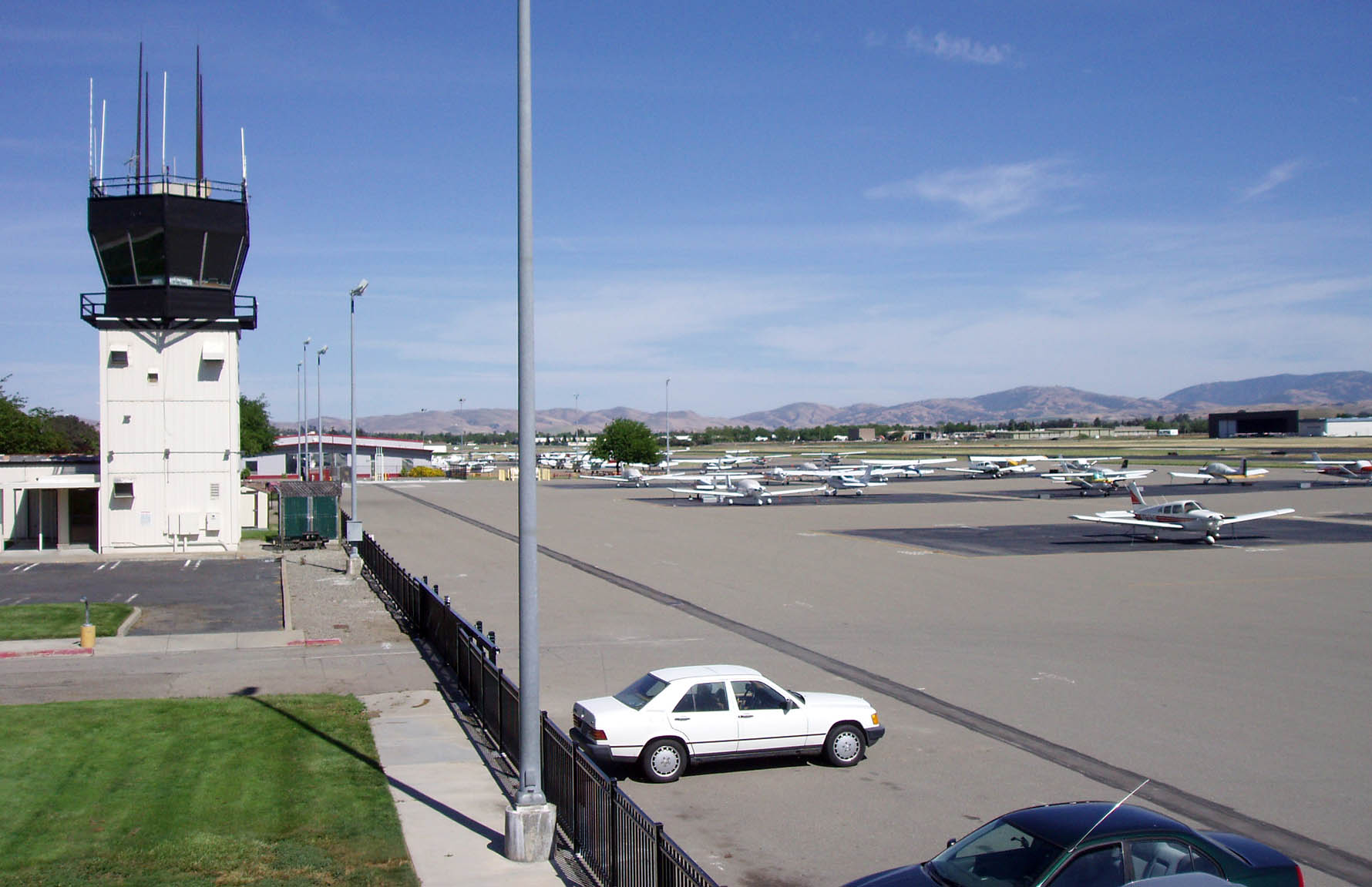
- ATC tower
- IATA: LVK; ICAO: KLVK; FAA LID: LVK

Summary
- Airport type: Public
- Owner/Operator: City of Livermore
- Location: Livermore, California
- Opened: December 1965
- Elevation AMSL: 400 ft / 122 m
- Coordinates: 37°41′36.2″N 121°49′13.3″W
- Website: www.cityoflivermore.net/airport

Map

Runways
Direction	Length		Surface
Direction	ft	m	Surface
7L/25R	5,253 x 100	1,601 × 30	Asphalt
7R/25L	2,699 x 75	823 × 23	Asphalt

Helipads
Number	Length		Surface
Number	ft	m	Surface
H1	24 x 22	7 × 7	Asphalt

Statistics (2018)
- Based aircraft: 425
- Aircraft operations: 148,153
- Source: Federal Aviation Administration

Livermore Municipal Airport (IATA: LVK, ICAO: KLVK) is three miles west of Livermore, California, in Alameda County, California. The Federal Aviation Administration (FAA) National Plan of Integrated Airport Systems for 2017–2021 categorized it as a regional reliever facility.

Livermore Municipal Airport (LVK) was completed and ready for use in December 1965. The new airport encompassed 257 acres, a 4,000-foot asphalt runway with a parallel taxiway, an aircraft parking apron with 100 tie-downs, a beacon, a lighted wind cone and segmented circle, and 50 based aircraft. In 1969, Livermore Airport recorded 269,600 operations. In 1970, the first hangars and T-shelters were constructed and an air traffic control tower was added in 1973.

A comprehensive Airport Master Plan was completed in 1975 to identify facility improvements to meet the growing demand for local air transportation services. A precision instrument approach landing system (ILS) was added to Runway 7L-25R in 1979. An Environmental Impact Report (EIR) was completed in 1982. In 1985, a 2,699-foot parallel runway was constructed to ease congestion on the main runway. At the same time, the southwest apron area was constructed to provide for additional aircraft parking. Additional hangars were constructed on the Airport’s southside in 1987. An extension of the main runway to 5,255 feet followed in 1989.

Increasing problems with the encroachment of incompatible land uses around the Airport caused the City of Livermore to engage a consultant to study the viability of an Airport Protection Area (APA). As a result of the study, the City and the Alameda County Airport Land Use Commission (ALUC) adopted an APA area around the Airport in which residential development is prohibited.

Since 1985, Livermore Municipal Airport has made over $25 million in facility improvements, including the cost of property acquisition to enhance protection of approaches to the runways. Today, the Livermore Municipal Airport encompasses 590 acres, 392 hangars of various sizes and shapes, 249 tie-downs, 9 shelters, and is home to 580 based aircraft. In calendar year 1993, Livermore Municipal Airport was the 11th busiest Airport in California with 282,631 operations. In 2022, that number has dropped to 197,236 annual operations.

Year	Annual Operations
1969	269,600
1993	282,631
2022	197,236

The airport has no scheduled airline service; the closest commercial airports are Oakland International Airport and San Jose International Airport. In the 1976-1977 OAG the regional airline California Air Commuter had scheduled service listed at Livermore, using Piper Navajos.

== Facilities ==
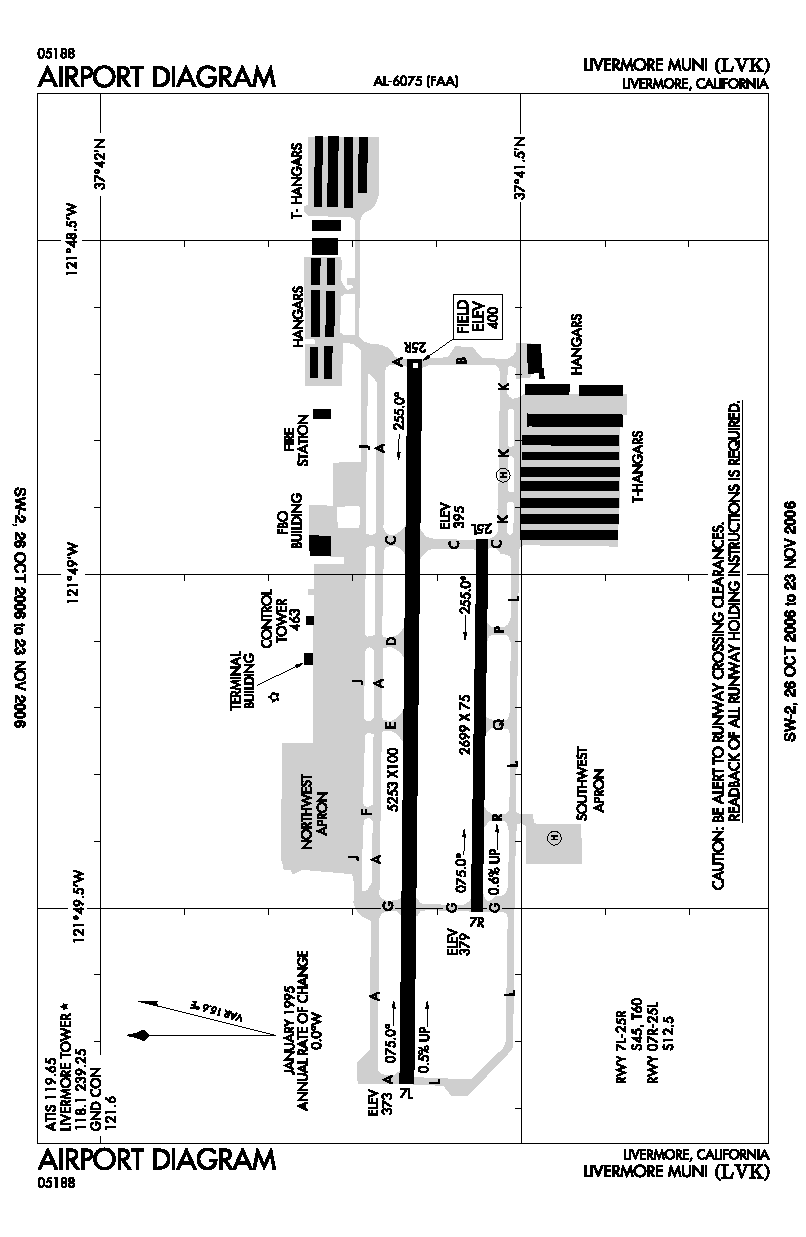
FAA diagram

Livermore Municipal Airport covers 644 acres (261 ha) at an elevation of 400 feet (122 m). It has two asphalt runways:

- 7L/25R is 5,253 by 100 feet (1,601 × 30m). Is approved for instrument approaches.
- 7R/25L is 2,699 by 75 feet (823 × 23m). It was built in 1985 and is used mainly for training.

The airport has one asphalt helipad: H1 is 24 by 22 feet (7.3 m × 6.7 m).

In the year ending May 1, 2018 the airport had 148,153 aircraft operations, average 424 per day: 98% general aviation, 1% air taxi, <1% airline and <1% military. In September 2018, 461 aircraft were based at this airport: 417 single-engine, 33 multi-engine, 6 jet, and 5 helicopter.

Besides the 8,400-square-foot (780 m^{2}) terminal building, built in 2015, there are nearly 400 aircraft storage hangar units, a corporate-style hangar building containing 20,000 square feet (1,900 m^{2}) of space and an aircraft storage shelter.

== Expansion plans ==
In 2021 KaiserAir filed a letter of intent to expand to Livermore Municipal Airport:

- Phase One: Concrete apron ( 293,200 square feet), terminal building 5,000 square feet), fuel storage, self- service avgas fuel station, vehicle parking lot and airfield infrastructure improvements
- Phase Two: Hangar complex ( 64,000 square feet), 18 rectangular 60' x60' hangars
- Phase Three: Two-story office building and hangar complex ( 38,000 square feet) and the addition of Boeing 737 operations
- Phase Four: Ground service equipment maintenance building ( 4,000 square feet) and two t-hangar complexes ( 60,000 square feet)

In 2022, local government officials said that it appeared that KaiserAir was "not moving forward" with their originally proposed project.

== Accidents and incidents ==
- On February 23, 2021, a private Mooney M20 aircraft crashed onto a car on a nearby freeway overpass. No one was injured, but both the airplane and the car suffered substantial damage.

== See also ==
- List of airports in the San Francisco Bay area
