= Marin County Airport =

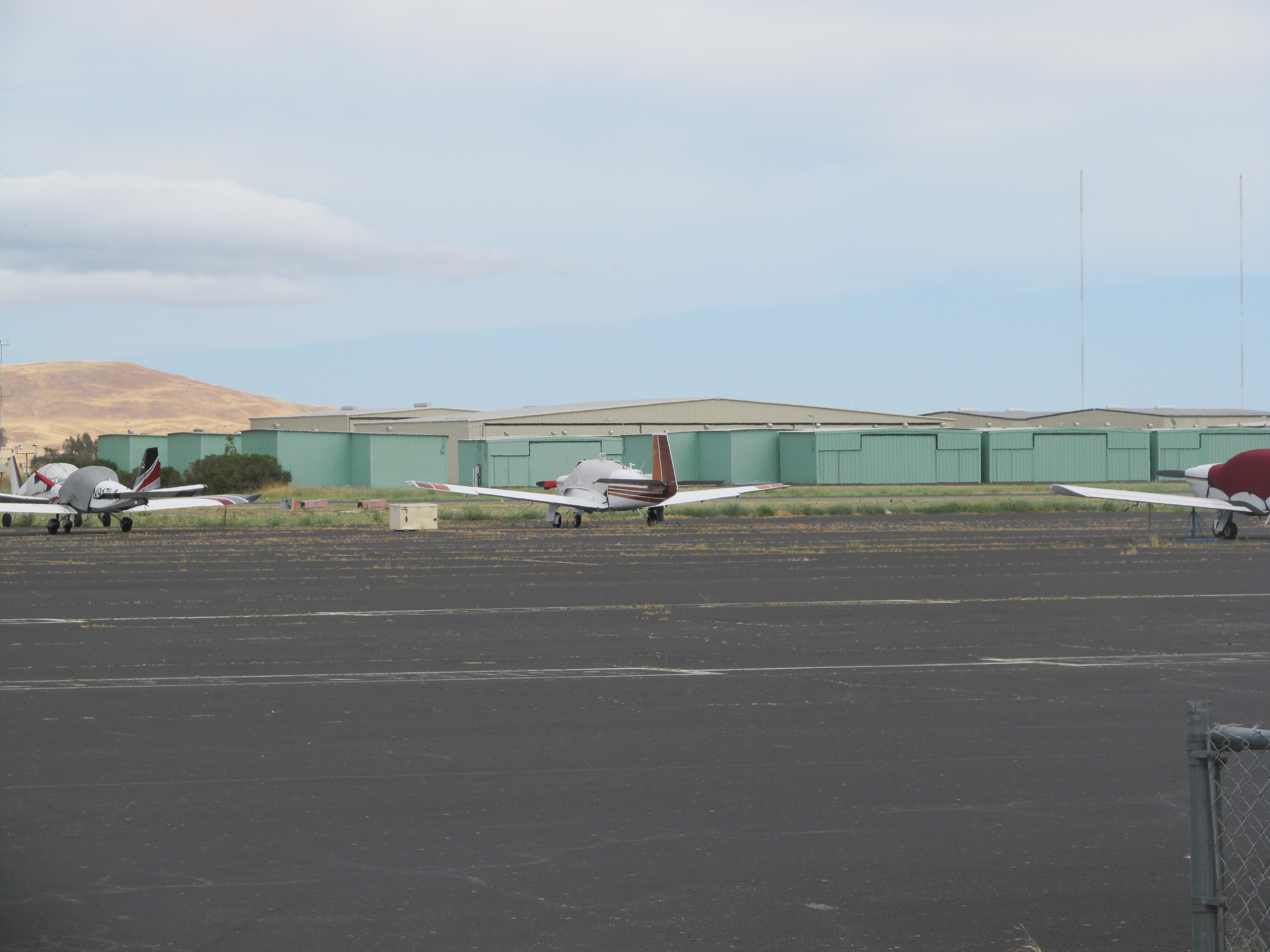
- IATA: NOT; ICAO: KDVO; FAA LID: DVO

Summary
- Operator: Marin County
- Location: Marin County, California
- Elevation AMSL: 2 ft / 0.6 m
- Coordinates: 38°08′37″N 122°33′22″W
- Interactive map of Marin County Airport

Runways
Direction	Length		Surface
Direction	ft	m	Surface
13/31	3,300	1,006	Asphalt

Helipads
Number	Length		Surface
Number	ft	m	Surface
H1	60	18	Concrete

Marin County Airport or Gnoss Field (IATA: NOT, ICAO: KDVO, FAA LID: DVO), formerly O56, is a public airport two miles northeast of Novato, California, United States. It covers 90 acres (360,000 m^{2}), and has one runway and one helipad.

Most U.S. airports use the same three-letter location identifier for the FAA and IATA, but Marin County Airport/Gnoss Field is DVO to the FAA and NOT to the IATA (which assigned DVO to Francisco Bangoy International Airport in Davao City, Philippines).

A plan was unveiled in 2014 to extend the length of Gnoss' runway by 1100', to 4400'. The FAA's final recommendation in 2016 called for a 300-foot extension, which would make Runway 31/13 3600 feet. Public commentary, especially from aviators, was negative. Many pilots contended that the FAA has underestimated the level of activity at Gnoss Field.

== History ==
The airport was opened by the Wright family just after World War II to serve the thousands of ex-military pilots expected to be flying after the war.

The Wrights original privately owned airport had a dirt runway and was just west of the current airport, in what is now a grassy field. The last vestiges of the Wright airport buildings burned in a grass fire about 2005.

In 1968 the County of Marin bought the airport and moved it to its present location.

Somehow (stories are numerous) Gnoss's single runway is laid out almost exactly perpendicular to the prevailing onshore west winds. One of the stories for this alignment is that financing from the Marin County government was tight so it was decided to lay out the runway in a similar fashion to the main runway at nearby Hamilton Air Force Base.

A more reasonable explanation, regardless of the prevailing cross wind, is that the original runway orientation aligned squarely with Mt. Burdell, a 1500' mountain located just 1 mi. to the west. Several aircraft had collided with Mt. Burdell before the new airport was built, and the current runway orientation provided an unobstructed approach and departure from both directions. It also became feasible to design an instrument approach with the current runway orientation which has significantly increased the utility of the facility.

In the mid-1960s, Marin County Supervisor William A. Gnoss, who served the district where the airport is located, obtained funds from the FAA through his friendship with then-Congressman Donald Clausen by appearing at the FAA in Washington, D.C. Funds were used for runway and hangar development. In appreciation, the entire Marin County Board of Supervisors voted to name the airport "Gnoss Field" in his honor.

Gnoss Field celebrated its 50-year anniversary in 2009–2010.

== Past airline service ==
California Air Commuter (Cal Air) was headquartered at Gnoss Field and flew from Fort Bragg, Ukiah, Clear Lake, Santa Rosa, Petaluma, Gnoss Field and San Francisco International Airport in 1976-77. Cal Air was founded by the original fixed base operator (FBO) at Gnoss, Marin Aviation, a Piper dealer and flight school owned and operated by Richard T. Duste. Cal Air expanded south and east to San Jose, Salinas, Monterey and Sacramento, South Lake Tahoe, Truckee and Reno.

Stol Air Commuter Britten-Norman BN-2 Islanders and Britten-Norman BN-2A Trislanders flew between Gnoss and San Francisco (SFO) in the 1970s.

== Gnoss' famous crosswinds ==
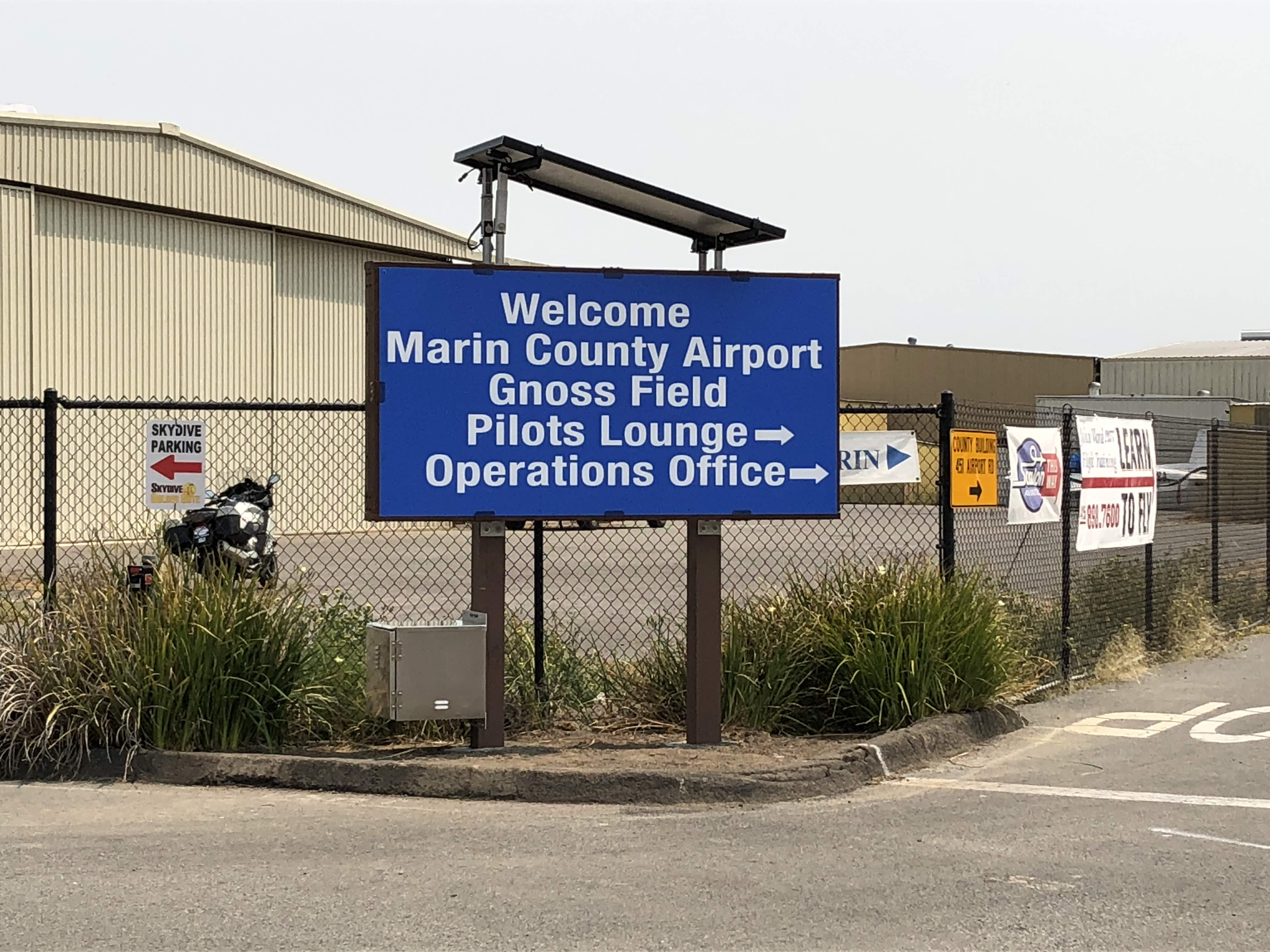
Marin County Airport sign

Gnoss Field is known to local pilots and flight instructors as an excellent airport to practice crosswind landings, especially during afternoons in the late spring and summer when the west wind picks up. The single (31/13) runway is on a similar heading as the close by Hamilton Air Force Base (closed) and Petaluma Municipal Airport (O69) runways, but the prevailing summer afternoon onshore west wind direction and speed at Gnoss Field are changed and amplified by proximity to 1,555-foot (474 m) Burdell Mountain, just west of the airport.

When Gnoss Field's crosswinds exceed pilot or aircraft limitations, local pilots generally land at Petaluma Municipal / O69 (7.2 nautical miles (13.3 km), 327 magnetic heading) or Napa County Airport / KAPC (13.6 nautical miles (25.2 km), 058 magnetic heading). Petaluma Municipal rarely has bad crosswinds on its single runway (29/11) and Napa has multiple runways.

The typical Gnoss Field crosswind landing conditions on runway 31 are stronger than reported headwind on right base and, in a typical training aircraft, a slight amount of wind shear about 100 feet (30 m) before the runway 31 threshold, settling down to a steady crosswind - but then adding to a slight headwind component, just past the near west side hangars. Most locally based small plane pilots either land short to be going below flying speed before the end of the near west hangars or touchdown after the end of the near west side hangars for more consistent wind conditions during landing.

Typical left traffic pattern 13 landings during high crosswinds are flown through varying rotor wind turbulence on the backside of Burdell Mountain and a relatively constant crosswind near the ground.

AWOS reports more closely conditions on the 31 end of the runway, and wind conditions are commonly significantly different on each end of the runway.

Gnoss has two windsocks. During remodeling in 2007 the "13" windsock was removed. By immediate popular demand, the 13 end windsock was replaced by airport management as soon as a replacement was located.

== See also ==
- List of airports in the San Francisco Bay area
