= Petaluma Municipal Airport =

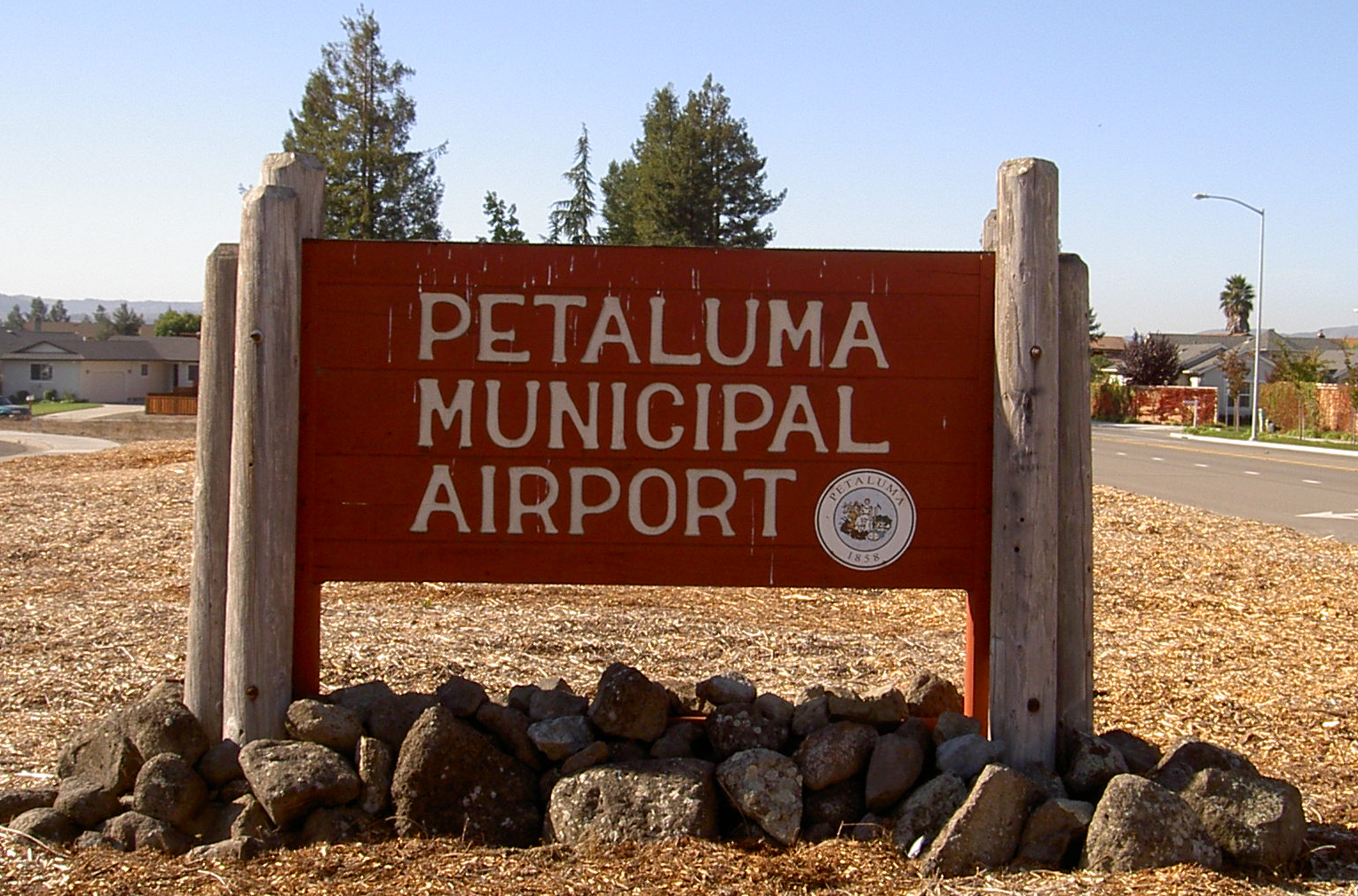
- sign outside Petaluma Municipal Airport
- IATA: none; ICAO: none; FAA LID: O69

Summary
- Airport type: Public
- Operator: City of Petaluma
- Location: Petaluma
- Elevation AMSL: 87 ft / 26.5 m
- Coordinates: 38°15′28″N 122°36′20″W
- Interactive map of Petaluma Municipal Airport

Runways
Direction	Length		Surface
Direction	ft	m	Surface
11/29	3,601	1,097	Asphalt

Petaluma Municipal Airport (FAA LID: O69) is a public airport one mile (1.6 km) northeast of Petaluma, in Sonoma County, California, United States. It covers 220 acres (89 ha) and has one runway measuring 3601 x 75 feet. It is used for general aviation. FedEx feeder flies Cessna Caravan 208Bs into Petaluma.

== General information ==
Founded in 1915, the Petaluma Municipal Airport is a class G general aviation airport located on Skyranch Drive in Petaluma, California. The airport accommodates 60,000 takeoffs and landings each year. It has one runway of heading 110 and 290, with 290 being the primary runway due to typical wind conditions in the area. The airport is non-towered, and aircraft with radios are required to communicate on frequency 122.7. Departure procedures require that all aircraft climb to 1500 feet above sea level. All arrivals are required to follow noise abatement procedures due to roads and residences adjacent to the airfield.

== Airport facilities ==
The Petaluma Municipal Airport is operated by the city of Petaluma 24 hours a day, and is staffed from Monday through Friday 0800-1700, and Saturday through Sunday 0800-1600. It is staffed on all holidays.

=== Aircraft storage ===
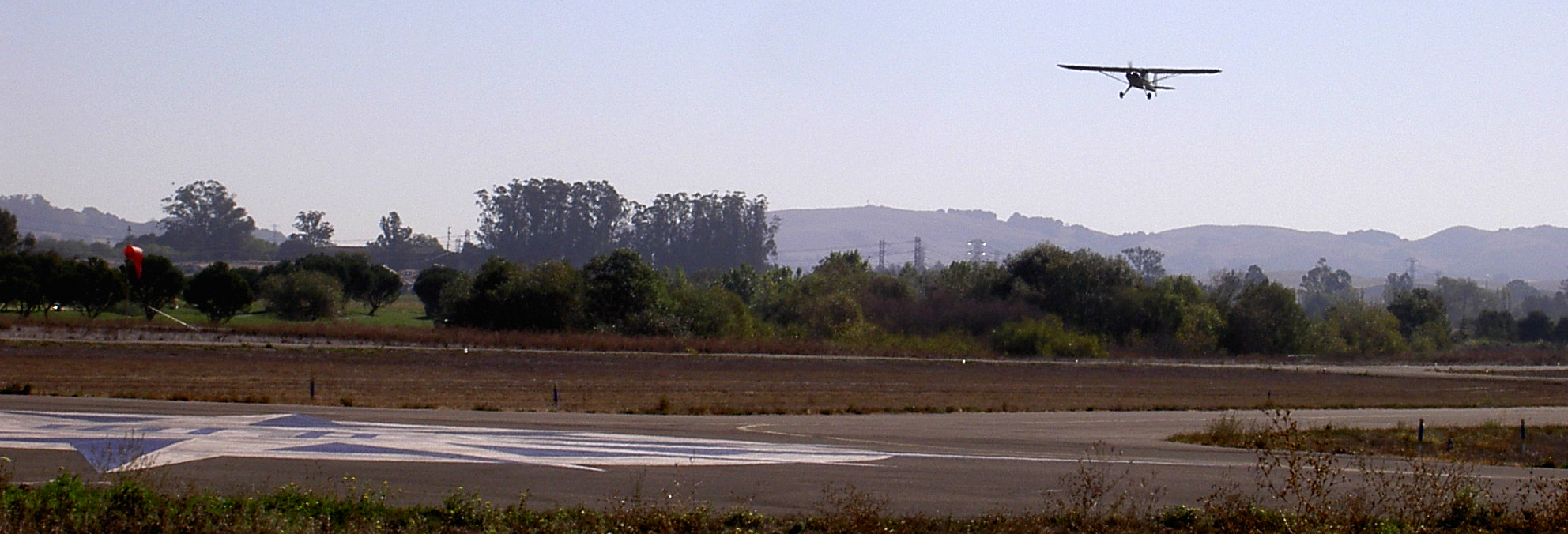
Petaluma Municipal Airport

Hangars and tie-down spaces are available for rent on a limited basis. Aircraft hangars are available in multiple sizes, and tie down spaces are available for both single and twin engine aircraft.

=== Two-Niner Diner ===
Named after ideal flying conditions (29.92 inches of mercury on the altimeter), the Two-Niner Diner is located at the end of runway 29. Opened in 1991, the restaurant is frequented by pilots flying into the airport from all over Sonoma County. It uses local ingredients and serves typical diner fare.

=== Mangon Aircraft ===
Originally opened at Smith Ranch Airport, in 1969, Mangon Aircraft is an aircraft maintenance facility that has since relocated to the Petaluma Municipal Airport. Owned and operated by Ronald Mangon, Mangon Aircraft provides various services to many types of aircraft, and shares employees with the pilot training center.

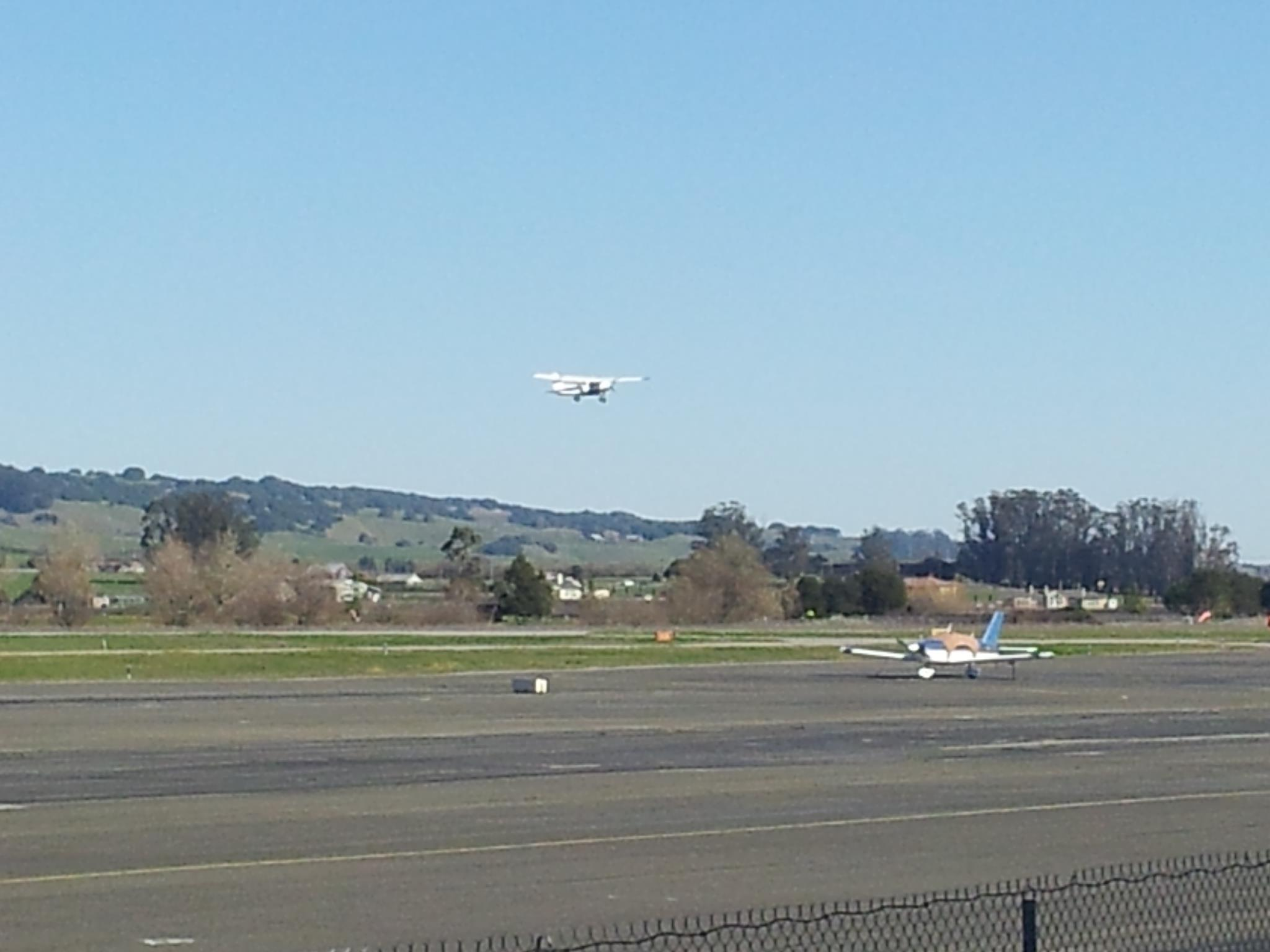
A Cessna 172SP of the Petaluma Pilot Training Center departing from Runway 110

== Petaluma Pilot Training Center ==
The Petaluma Pilot Training Center is a pilot training facility located at Petaluma Municipal Airport (O69). It provides instruction to those without a pilot license, and aircraft rental to those who are certified. It offers instruction to obtain a private pilot certificate, as well as an instrument rating and additional endorsements.

The center operates a fleet of five aircraft: a 1975 Cessna 150M, a 1974 Cessna 172M, a 1975 Cessna 172M, a 1974 Piper PA28R-200, and a 2007 Cessna 172SP, outfitted with a glass cockpit.

The pilot training center cooperates with personnel from the airport, as well as employees from Mangon Aircraft Repair.

== Accidents and incidents ==
- On January 4, 2002 a pilot flying a Cessna 152 fatally collided with mountains near the airfield, destroying the aircraft, owned and operated by Aeroventure. According to the owner of Aeroventure, the pilot was neither qualified nor endorsed by the school to fly the Cessna 152, and did not possess a license that allowed him to fly solo at night. Eyewitnesses said that the pilot began flying the aircraft without performing any preflight or departure checks. According to the Sonoma County Sheriff's Department, the pilot involved in the accident was under criminal investigation. Earlier that day, police had seized his computer for criminal investigation while he was flying a different aircraft. An autopsy report ruled the manner of death to be suicide.
- On April 3, 2015, a pilot was killed after his aircraft crashed into a rural area near the airport. The aircraft was a 1984 fixed wing, single engine lightweight similar to a glider. The aircraft crashed across the street from a PG&E power station located along the base leg of the traffic pattern of the airport.
- On July 3, 2022, a Cessna 182 Skylane crashed into a hangar at Petaluma during a landing attempt. The aircraft became wedged into the side of the structure, and a gas leak found at the scene was fixed. Though the aircraft was substantially damaged, the sole pilot was not injured. The incident is under investigation.

== Nearby airports ==
=== Santa Rosa ===
Approximately 18 miles north of the Petaluma Municipal Airport is the Charles M Schulz airport (STS). It operates two runways: runway 14/32 and runway 2/20. The Santa Rosa airport operates in a class D tower controlled airspace during the hours of 1500-0400, and is a class G airspace at all other times. It is a popular destination for pilots departing from the Petaluma Municipal Airport. Pilots flying into the airfield during its attended hours are required to contact the Santa Rosa tower controller on radio frequency 118.5; during unattended hours, they must communicate on the UNICOM frequency 122.95.

=== Gnoss Field ===
Located just south of the Petaluma Municipal Airport is Gnoss Field (DVO). It has one runway, 13/31, surrounded by ditches. It operates under a constant noise abatement procedure due to residences nearby. There are mountains and electrical towers in the vicinity of the runway, making approaches to the airfield challenging depending on wind conditions. Gnoss Field is frequently traveled to from the Petaluma Municipal Airport. Communications near this airport use the UNICOM frequency 123.075.

== See also ==
- List of airports in the San Francisco Bay Area
