= List of airports in the San Francisco Bay Area =

Commercial aviation airports of the San Francisco Bay area (Sonoma County Airport not in view)

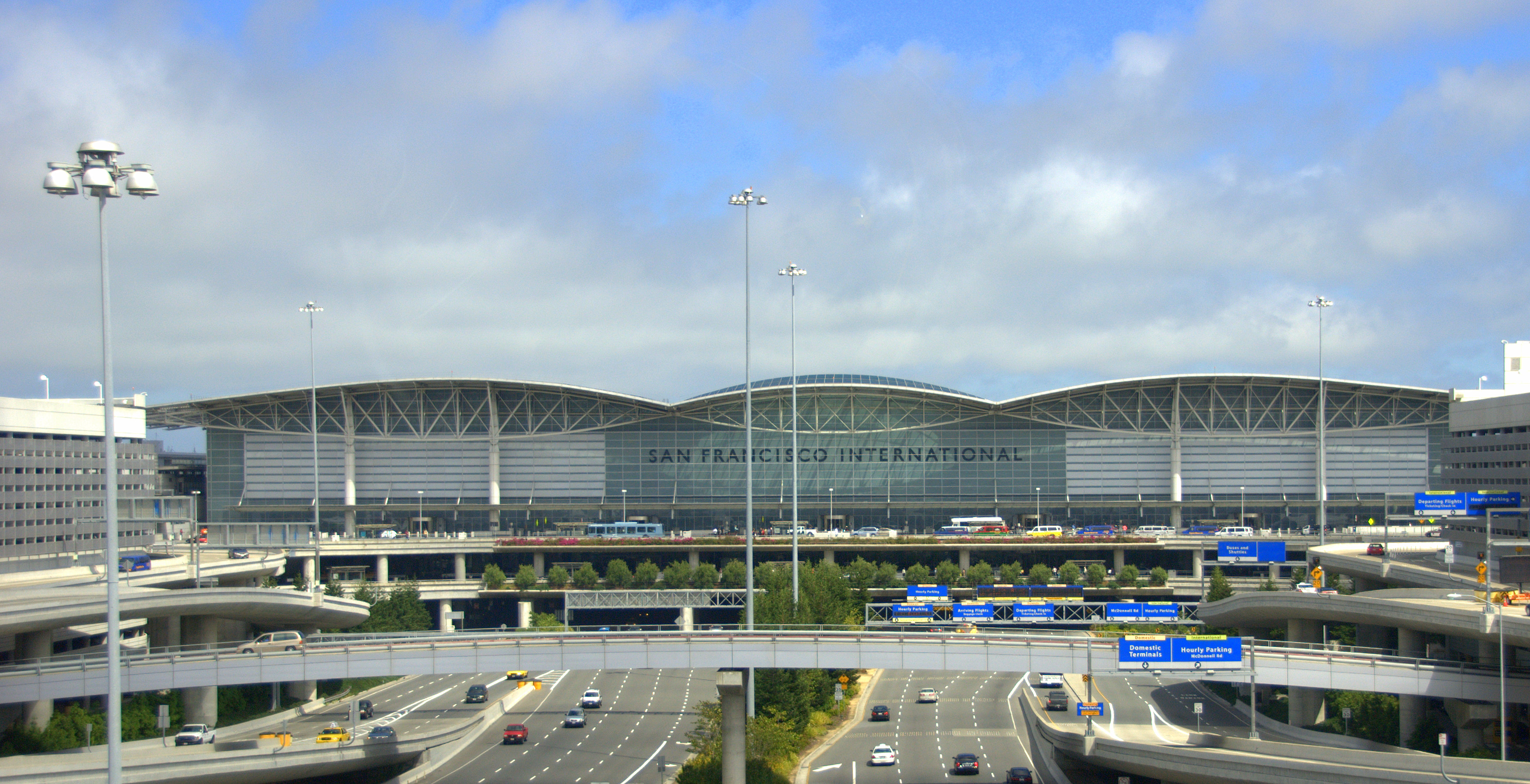
San Francisco International Airport

The following airports are in the area around the San Francisco Bay, including the cities of San Jose, San Francisco, and Oakland. The list includes only public-use and/or government-owned airports in the eleven counties (the nine counties that border the bay, plus Santa Cruz and San Benito Counties) that make up the Census Bureau's San Jose–San Francisco–Oakland, CA Combined Statistical Area.

== Commercial airports ==
Airport	IATA	ICAO	County	Notes
San Francisco International Airport	SFO	KSFO	San Mateo	Primary international airport serving the region; Primary Pacific hub for United Airlines; One of the Pacific hubs for Alaska Airlines
San Jose Mineta International Airport	SJC	KSJC	Santa Clara	Primary airport for Santa Clara County and Silicon Valley
Oakland San Francisco Bay Airport	OAK	KOAK	Alameda	Serves the East Bay; Operating base for Southwest Airlines
Charles M. Schulz–Sonoma County Airport	STS	KSTS	Sonoma	Serves the North Bay and Wine Country

== Federal airports ==
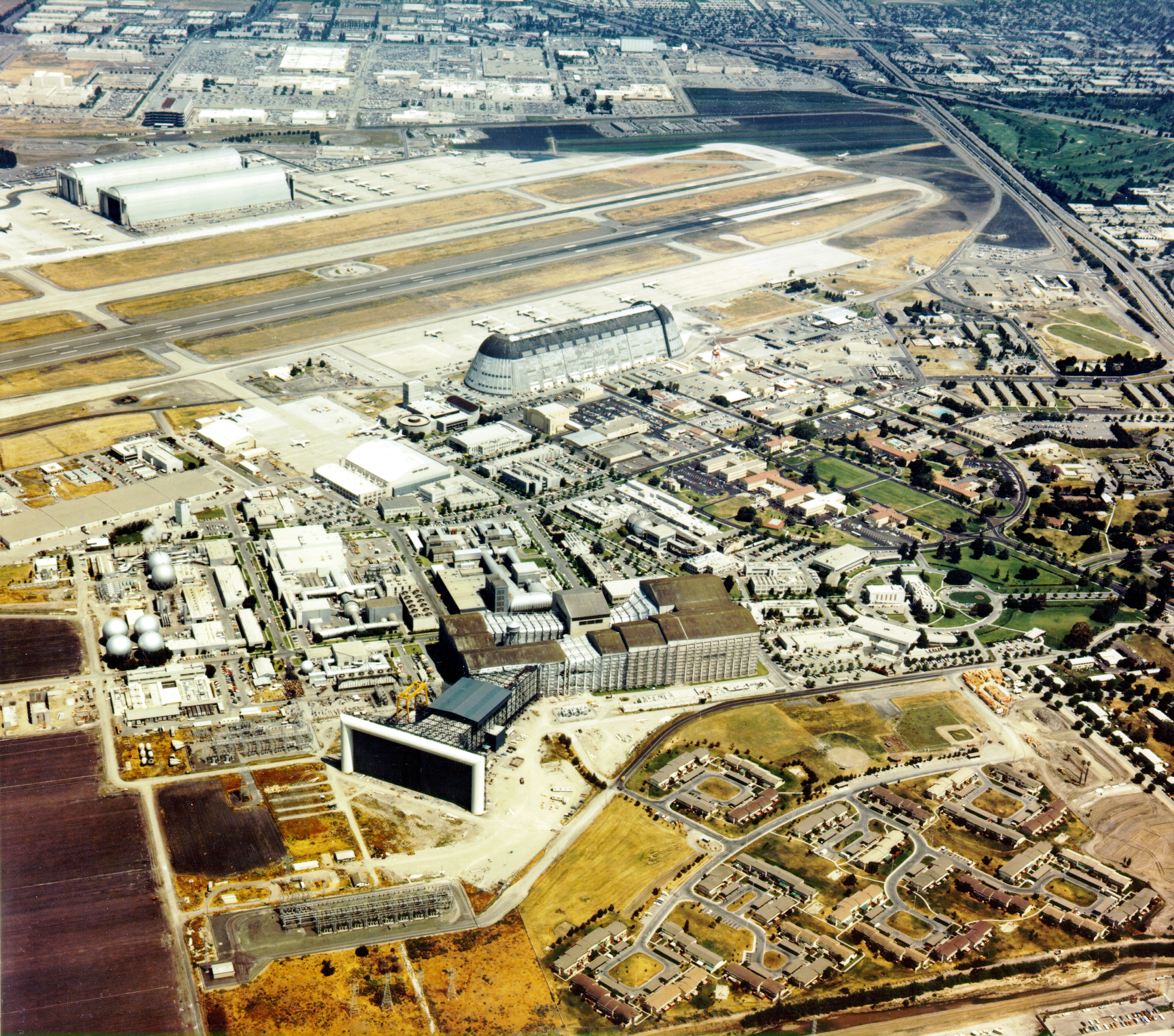
Moffett Field

The following airports are operated by the federal government and are not open to the public:

Airport	IATA	ICAO	County	Notes
Moffett Federal Airfield	NUQ	KNUQ	Santa Clara	Serves NASA's Ames Research Center; Former Naval Air Station Moffett Field; operated by NASA since 1994
Travis Air Force Base	SUU	KSUU	Solano	Major U.S. Air Force air mobility hub; Home of the 60th Air Mobility Wing; Primary West Coast hub for Air Mobility Command

== General aviation airports ==
Towered

Airport	IATA	ICAO	County	Notes
Buchanan Field Airport	CCR	KCCR	Contra Costa	FAA-designated reliever airport for the Bay Area.
Hayward Executive Airport	HWD	KHWD	Alameda	Reliever airport serving the East Bay.
Livermore Municipal Airport	LVK	KLVK	Alameda	FAA-designated regional reliever airport.
Napa County Airport	APC	KAPC	Napa	General aviation airport serving Napa Valley.
Palo Alto Airport	PAO	KPAO	Santa Clara	Closest general aviation airport to Stanford University and central Silicon Valley.
Reid–Hillview Airport	RHV	KRHV	Santa Clara	FAA-designated reliever airport for San José Mineta International Airport.
San Carlos Airport	SQL	KSQL	San Mateo	Major general aviation airport serving the Peninsula.

=== Non-towered ===
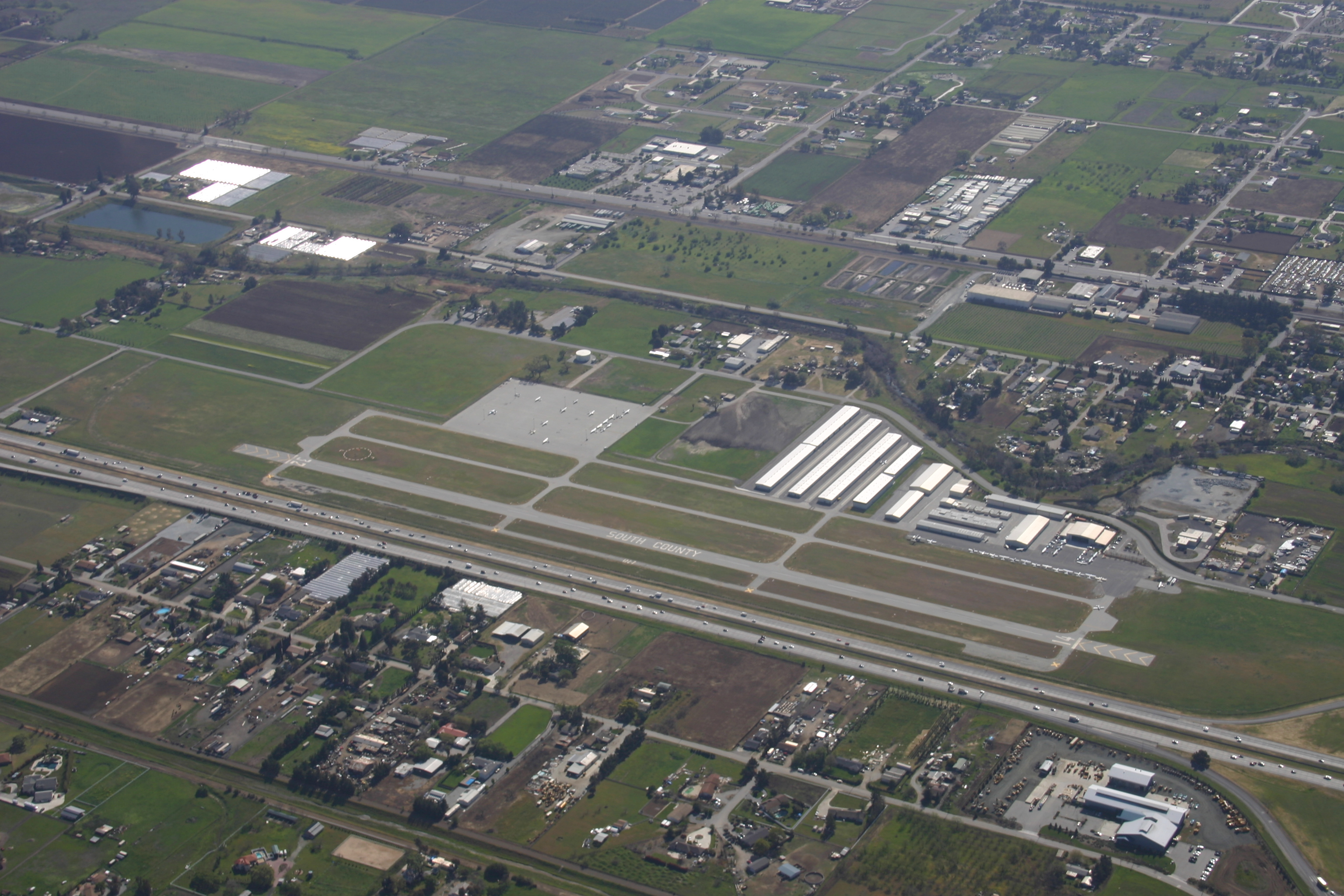
San Martin Airport, view from northeast

The following airports do not have control towers, but are listed by their owners as open to the public; pilots announce runway and airspace usage via radio contact:

Airport	IATA/FAA	ICAO	County	Notes
Angwin–Parrett Field	—	2O3	Napa	Public airport serving Angwin and Pacific Union College.
Byron Airport	—	—	Contra Costa	Popular soaring, skydiving, and training airport; FAA reliever airport.
Cloverdale Municipal Airport	—	O60	Sonoma	General aviation airport serving northern Sonoma County.
Half Moon Bay Airport	HAF	KHAF	San Mateo	Coastal airport near the Pacific Ocean and Half Moon Bay.
Healdsburg Municipal Airport	HES	KHES	Sonoma	General aviation airport serving the Healdsburg area.
Hollister Municipal Airport	CVH	KCVH	San Benito	Public airport serving San Benito County.
Marin County Airport	DVO	KDVO	Marin	Public airport serving Marin County.
Nut Tree Airport	VCB	KVCB	Solano	General aviation airport adjacent to the historic Nut Tree development.
Petaluma Municipal Airport	—	O69	Sonoma	Public airport serving Petaluma and southern Sonoma County.
Rio Vista Municipal Airport	—	O88	Solano	Public airport serving Rio Vista and the Sacramento–San Joaquin Delta.
Sonoma Skypark	—	OQ9	Sonoma	Privately owned public-use airport.
Sonoma Valley Airport	—	OQ3	Sonoma	Public-use airport serving Sonoma Valley.
San Martin Airport	—	E16	Santa Clara	County-owned general aviation airport serving southern Santa Clara County.
Watsonville Municipal Airport	WVI	KWVI	Santa Cruz	General aviation airport serving southern Santa Cruz County.

== Notable historical airports ==
- Naval Air Station Alameda in Alameda, Alameda County (closed 1997)
- Alum Rock Airport in San Jose, Santa Clara County (closed approximately 1936)
- Antioch Airport in Antioch, Contra Costa County (closed 1989)
- Carmel Valley Airport in Carmel Valley, California (closed 2002)
- Crissy Field in the City and County of San Francisco (airfield closed 1974)
- Hamilton Air Force Base in Novato, Marin County (closed 1996)
- Montgomery Field / Marina Airfield, now called Marina Green (Airmail Facility), San Francisco, California, formerly named after aviation pioneer John Joseph Montgomery
- Santa Cruz Skypark in Scotts Valley, Santa Cruz County (closed 1983)

== See also ==
- List of airports in California
- List of airports of Santa Cruz County, California
