= Watsonville Municipal Airport =

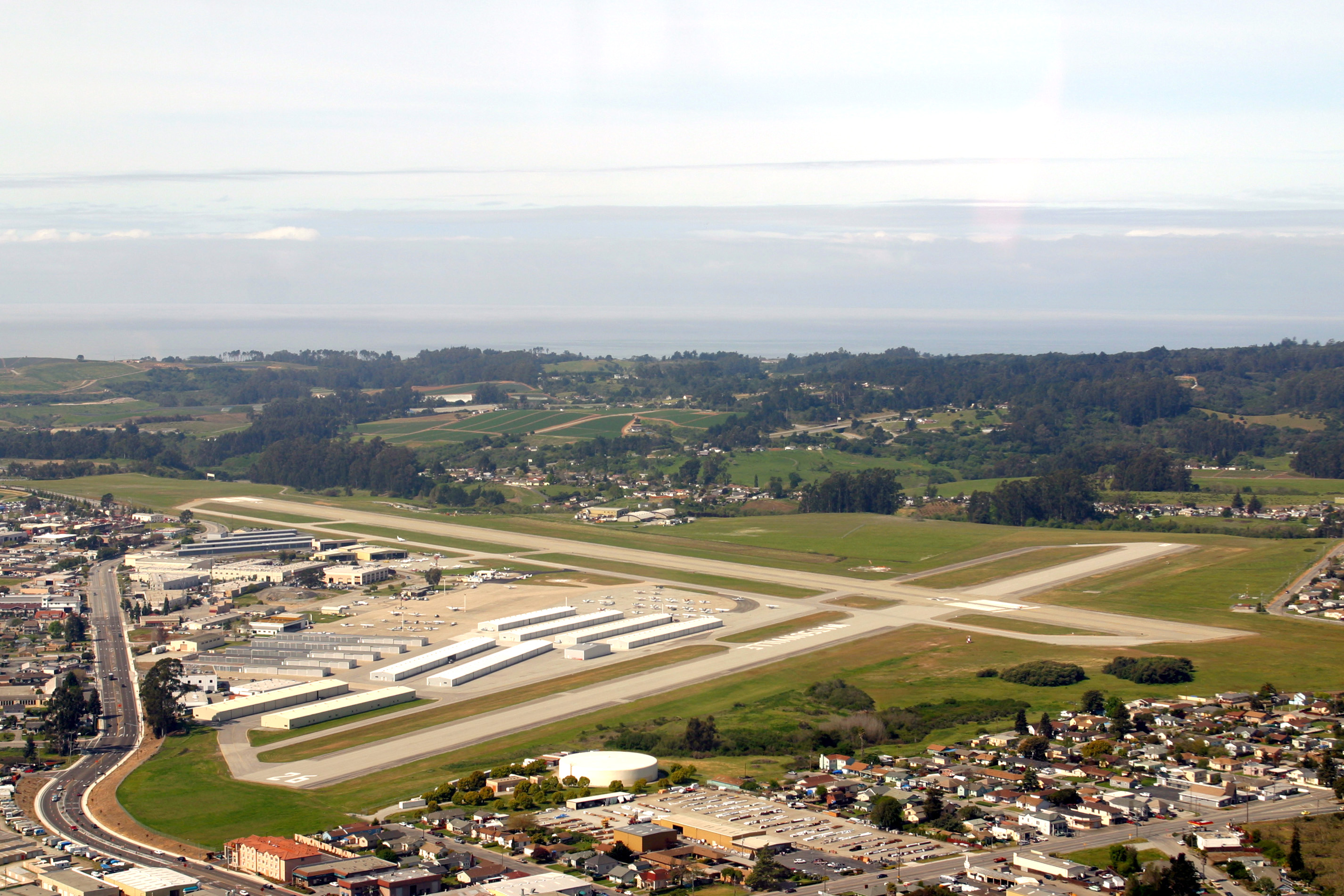
- Photo of Watsonville Municipal Airport

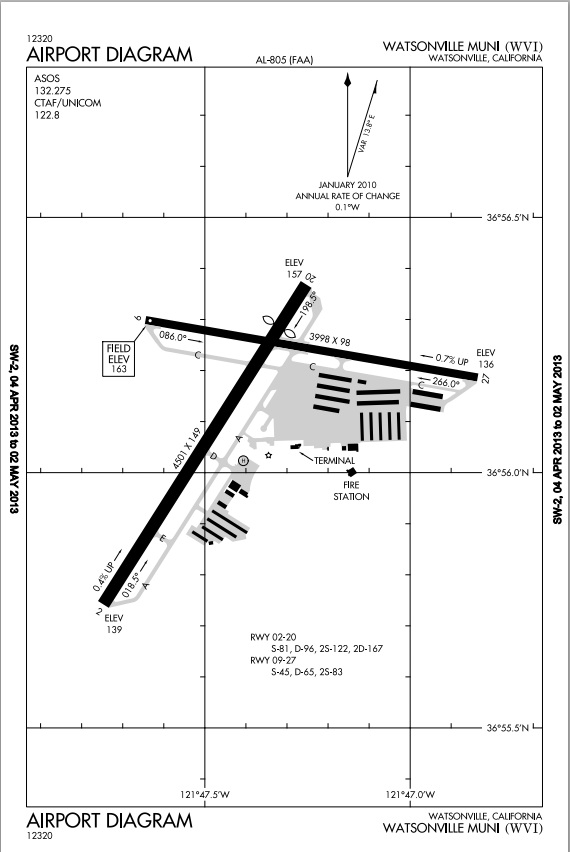
- Airport diagram
- IATA: WVI; ICAO: KWVI; FAA LID: WVI

Summary
- Airport type: Public
- Operator: City of Watsonville
- Location: Watsonville, California
- Elevation AMSL: 163 ft / 50 m
- Coordinates: 36°56′09″N 121°47′23″W

Map

Runways
Direction	Length		Surface
Direction	ft	m	Surface
2/20	4,501	1,372	Asphalt
9/27	3,998	1,219	Asphalt

Watsonville Municipal Airport (IATA: WVI, ICAO: KWVI, FAA LID: WVI) is three miles (5 km) northwest of Watsonville, in Santa Cruz County, California, United States. The airport covers 330 acres (134 ha) and has two runways. The largest aircraft to ever land at Watsonville were 05-5141 and 05–5143, C-17 Globemaster IIIs from March ARB, California.

== Facilities ==
The airport's longest runway is 02–20, 4501' x 149'. The crosswind runway, 09–27, 3998' x 98', is used when winds favor it and when fog is moving across the field from Monterey Bay.

The airport is uncontrolled, and the CTAF is 122.8 MHz, and the ASOS can be received on 132.275 MHz or by calling 831-724-8794.

== History ==
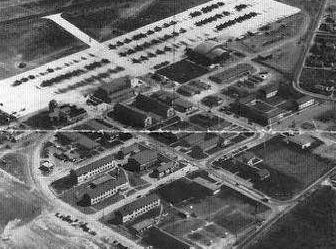
NAAS Watsonville, Naval Auxiliary Air Station Watsonville in 1945

The U.S. Navy took control of the former civilian airport in July 1943, purchased an additional 35 acres, and built support buildings and the concrete ramp. On October 23, 1943, the airport was commissioned as Naval Auxiliary Air Station Watsonville (NAAS Watsonville) and served as a satellite to Naval Air Station (NAS) Alameda. NAAS Watsonville provided training and maintenance for the 12th Naval District, Alameda, California under the Bureau of Yards and Docks, under the command of Lieutenant John C. Chapman. Antisubmarine Blimps in the defense of California from Moffett Field were stationed at NAAS Watsonville. Other aircraft stationed at the base were Grumman F6F Hellcat with the VF-8 and VBF-8. Up to 75 combat aircraft were stationed at the base. Also based at the airfield were Grumman TBF Avenger, Vought F4U Corsair and Douglas SBD Dauntless. These were used for the 90- to 120-day training classes, in torpedo, dive bomber and fighter operations. As World War II ended, so did operations at NAAS Watsonville. On November 1, 1945, NAAS Watsonville was closed and placed in caretaker status. NAAS Watsonville was returned to the City of Watsonville in 1947.

== Instrument approaches ==
The airport has three documented instrument approach procedures, making it a popular instrument training area.

- Localizer Runway 02 (requires overwater flight)
- RNAV (GPS) Runway 02 (requires overwater flight, LPV/WAAS minimums)
- VOR/DME-A (from Salinas VOR)

Instrument pilots have been advised that Watsonville is occasionally surrounded by non-IFR traffic that climbs or descends to low stratus layers in violation of regulations. Air traffic control (ATC) usually calls them out, but they cannot always see them. There are frequent radio calls to the common traffic advisory frequency (CTAF), even when instrument meteorological conditions (IMC) prevail.

== Accidents and incidents ==
On August 18, 2022, at 2:56 PM, two planes, a twin engine Cessna 340 and a single engine Cessna 152 collided with each other while attempting to land. Three fatalities have been reported.

== See also ==
- Old Watsonville Airport (1930–1947)
- List of airports of Santa Cruz County, California
- List of airports in the San Francisco Bay Area
- California during World War II
