= Healdsburg Municipal Airport =

- IATA: none; ICAO: KHES; FAA LID: HES

Summary
- Airport type: Public
- Operator: City of Healdsburg
- Location: Healdsburg, California
- Elevation AMSL: 278 ft (85 m)
- Coordinates: 38°39′13″N 122°53′58″W
- Interactive map of Healdsburg Municipal Airport

Runways
Direction	Length		Surface
Direction	ft	m	Surface
13/31	2,707	825	Asphalt

Healdsburg Municipal Airport (ICAO: KHES, FAA LID: HES) is three miles (4.8 km) northwest of Healdsburg, serving Sonoma County, California, United States.

== Facilities ==
The airport covers 50 acres; its single runway, 13/31, is 2,707 x 60 ft (825 x 18 m), asphalt.

== See also ==
- List of airports in the San Francisco Bay Area
