= Baldwin AS-616 =

217 diesel-electric locomotives

AS-616
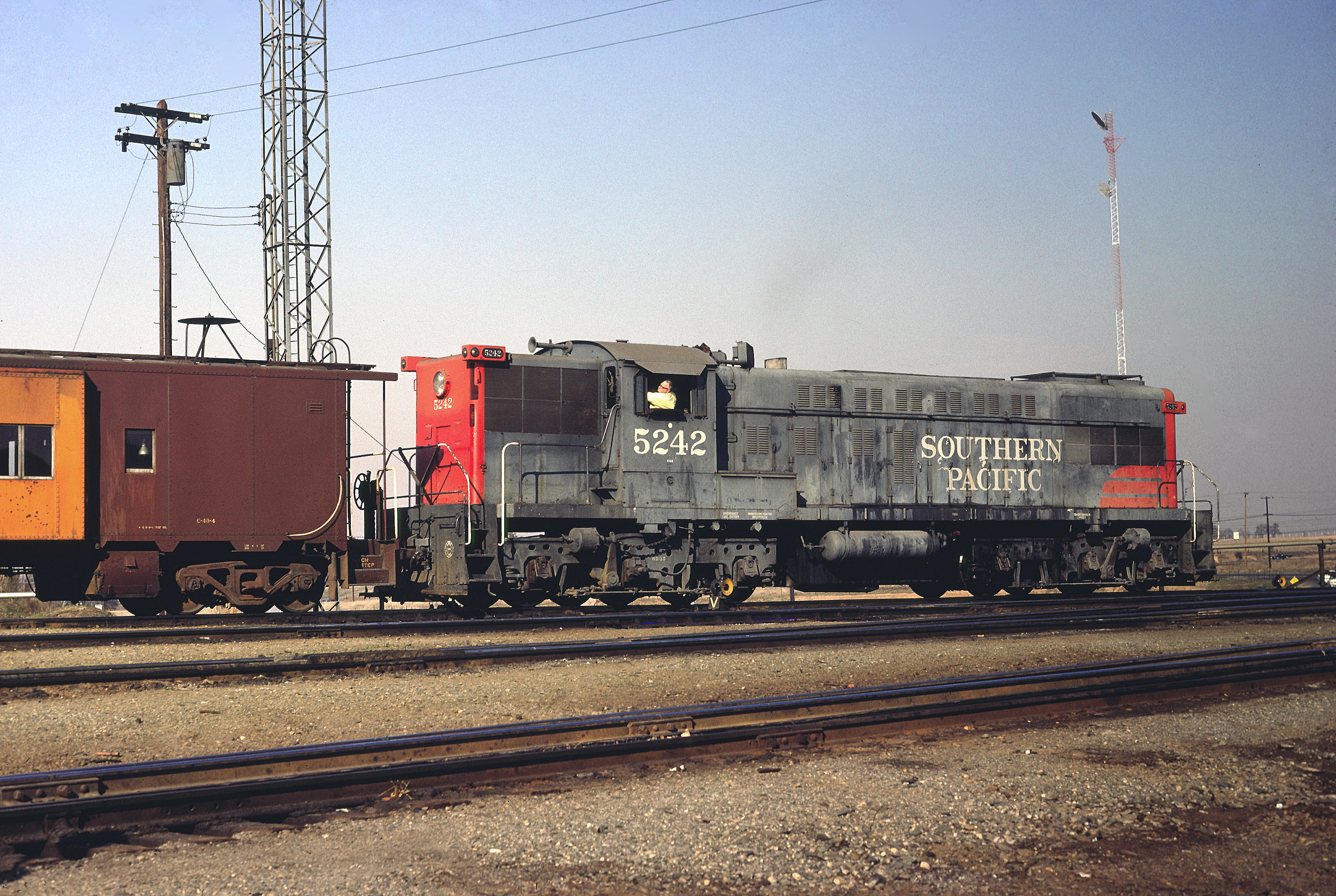
- Baldwin AS-616 diesel-electric locomotive at work for the Southern Pacific Transportation Company.
Type and origin
- Power type: Diesel-electric
- Builder: Baldwin-Lima-Hamilton Corporation
- Model: AS-616
- Build date: September 1950–May 1954
- Total produced: 214 (+7 B units)
Specifications
- Configuration
  - AAR: C-C
  - UIC: Co′Co′
- Gauge: 4 ft 8 1/2 in (1,435 mm) standard gauge
- Wheel diameter: 42 in (1,067 mm)
- Minimum curve: 30° (250.79 ft or 76.44 m radius)
- Wheelbase: 32 ft 3 in (9.83 m) between bolsters
- Length: 58 ft (18 m)
- Width: 10 ft (3.0 m)
- Height: 14 ft (4.3 m)
- Loco weight: 327,800 lb (148,700 kilograms)
- Fuel capacity: 900 US gallons (3,400 L; 750 imp gal)
- Prime mover: 608A
- RPM range: 625 (max)
- Engine type: Four-stroke engine
- Aspiration: Turbocharger Elliott Company H704 (125 hp (93 kW))
- Generator: Westinghouse YG42B
- Traction motors: Westinghouse 370DL (6)
- Cylinders: 8
Performance figures
- Power output: 1,625 hp (1,212 kW) (marketed as 1,600 hp (1,200 kW))
- Tractive effort: Starting: 97,500 lbf (434 kN); Continuous: 78,750 lbf (350.3 kN) @ 6 mph (9.7 km/h)
Career
- Operators: Various
- Locale: North America, Mexico, Brazil, Jamaica

The BLH AS-616 was a 1,600 horsepower (1,200 kW) C-C diesel-electric locomotive built by Baldwin-Lima-Hamilton between 1950 and 1954. Nineteen railroads bought 214 locomotives, and two railroads bought seven cabless B units. The AS-616 was valued for its extremely high tractive effort, far more than any comparable Alco or EMD product. It was used in much the same manner as its four-axle counterpart, the AS-16, and its six-axle sister, the AS-416, though the six-traction motor design allowed better tractive effort at lower speeds.

== Original owners ==
Image	Railroad	Quantity	Road numbers	Notes
	Baldwin-Lima-Hamilton (demonstrators)	2	1600	to Duluth, South Shore & Atlantic Railway 211, to Soo Line 395
	Baldwin-Lima-Hamilton (demonstrators)	2	1601	to Oregon and Northwestern Railroad 1
	Bessemer and Lake Erie Railroad	2	408, 409	
	Chicago and North Western Railway	3	1560, 1561, 1604	
	Chesapeake and Ohio Railway	39	5528–5529, 5533–5569	5533 to Eagle Mountain Railroad as 1020 in 1958
	Duluth, South Shore and Atlantic Railway	7	204–210	to Soo Line Railroad 388–394
	Eagle Mountain Railroad (Kaiser Steel)	2	1012A, 1012B	1012A later sent to Kaiser Bauxite Jamaica,1012B later sent to Rayonier
	Houston Belt and Terminal Railway	1	32	
	Milwaukee Road	6	2100–2101, 2104–2107	
	Milwaukee Road	2	2100B, 2101B	B units - rebuilt with cabs and renumbered 2102, 2103 c.1953
	Ferrocarriles Nacionales de México	20	6800–6819	
	Orinoco Mining Company, Venezuela (U.S. Steel)	9	1001–1009	
	Pennsylvania Railroad	12	8966–8974, 8111, 8112, 8114 (ex-PWV)	renumbered 6966–6977
	Pittsburgh & West Virginia Railway	1	40	to PRR in 1960
	Southern Pacific Company (Texas and New Orleans Railroad)	8	177–184	
	Southern Pacific Company	51	5228–5278	Included dynamic braking
	Southern Pacific Company	5	5501–5505	B units - renumbered 4901–4905; included dynamic braking
	Tennessee Coal, Iron and Railroad Company	5	1502–1506	
	Trona Railway	1	52	
	Union Pacific Railroad	6	1260–1265	
	Union Railroad	3	625–627	
	Estrada de Ferro Central do Brasil	12	3371–3382	1,600 mm (5 ft 3 in) gauge; included dynamic braking
	Estrada de Ferro Central do Brasil	20	4371–4390	1,000 mm (3 ft 3 3/8 in) metre gauge
	Rede de Viação Paraná-Santa Catarina (Brazil)	5	60–64	1,000 mm
Total		214	A units	
Total		7	B units	

== Design ==
The AS-616 was very similar to the previous model, the Baldwin DRS-6-6-1500, riding on the same basic frame and sharing the same body. The design was very simple, lacking the 1950s styling of the competing EMD F3 and ALCO FA. The utilitarian design was valued for switching jobs, a position the AS-616 filled easily.

The AS-616 would be the company's best selling road switcher, and the builder's third greatest selling diesel electric model of all time.

=== Redesign ===
In 1954, BLH (believing the utilitarian design of their road switchers was the cause of their overall failure on the market) redesigned their entire roster of locomotives, with all gaining new abilities. The most visible effect of the redesign was the raising of the roof on all their road switchers, causing the roof to take the shape of a triangular prism. Only a few units were sold with this design, as sales had dropped to their lowest at the time. BLH began offering dynamic braking on all road switchers, though the AS-616 was already offered with optional dynamic brakes.

== Usage ==
Despite being marketed as a road switcher (like the EMD SD9 and ALCO RSD-4 of the same time period), the AS-616 saw most use as a heavy switcher. The tractive effort and GSC rigid bolster trimount trucks appealed to roads with heavy hump yards (such as Southern Pacific). Ultimately, while many saw road service, the AS-616 was a switcher that was far ahead of its time.

BLH offered more options on the AS-616 in comparison to the DRS-6-6-1500, with some units gaining boilers, and others gaining dynamic braking. BLH also offered Multiple-unit train control on the AS-616, though many roads bought the unit purely for switching, opting out of MU. Some units that lacked MU were given MU by the parent company (or by an associate) depending on the road's preference.

By the 1970s almost all AS-616s had been scrapped or sold. A select few railroads-Trona Railway being a major operator- kept their diesels running far past their builder's lifetime.

== Preservation ==
Eight AS-616 diesels are preserved.

- Oregon and Northwestern Railroad #1, former Baldwin-Lima-Hamilton demonstrator #1601, at Pacific Southwest Railway Museum
- Trona Railway #52, at SMS Rail Lines as part of a former Trona Railway collection
- Southern Pacific #5250, in Jamaica
- Southern Pacific #5253, at Western Pacific Railroad Museum as Oregon & Northwestern #4
- Southern Pacific #5274, at Western Pacific Railroad Museum as Oregon & Northwestern #3
- Southern Pacific #5249, at SMS Rail Lines as part of a former Trona Railway collection
- Kaiser Steel #1012A, reportedly still with Kaiser Bauxite of Jamaica
- Kaiser Steel #1012B, at SMS Rail Lines, operational

A ninth example was formerly preserved, Southern Pacific #5239, which was sent to the Oregon and Northwestern Railroad in October 1964 where it was used on O&NW as #2. It was then cannibalized for spare parts through the final years of operation, It was then stored in 1984 before being sold to Pacific Northwest Chapter of the National Railway Historical Society in October 1990. 5239 was then later given to National Transportation Museum, St. Louis, Missouri, until it was stored in Tigard, Oregon and was subsequently scrapped in November 2009.

== Bibliography ==
- Moore, Jeff; Monger, Wayne I. (2013). Oregon & Northwestern Railroad. Arcadia Publishing Incorporated. ISBN 9781439644249.
- McDonald, Charles (1986). Diesel Locomotive Rosters - U.S., Canada, Mexico. Kalmbach Books. ISBN 0890240841.
