= Eagle Mountain, California =

Eagle Mountain
- Ghost town
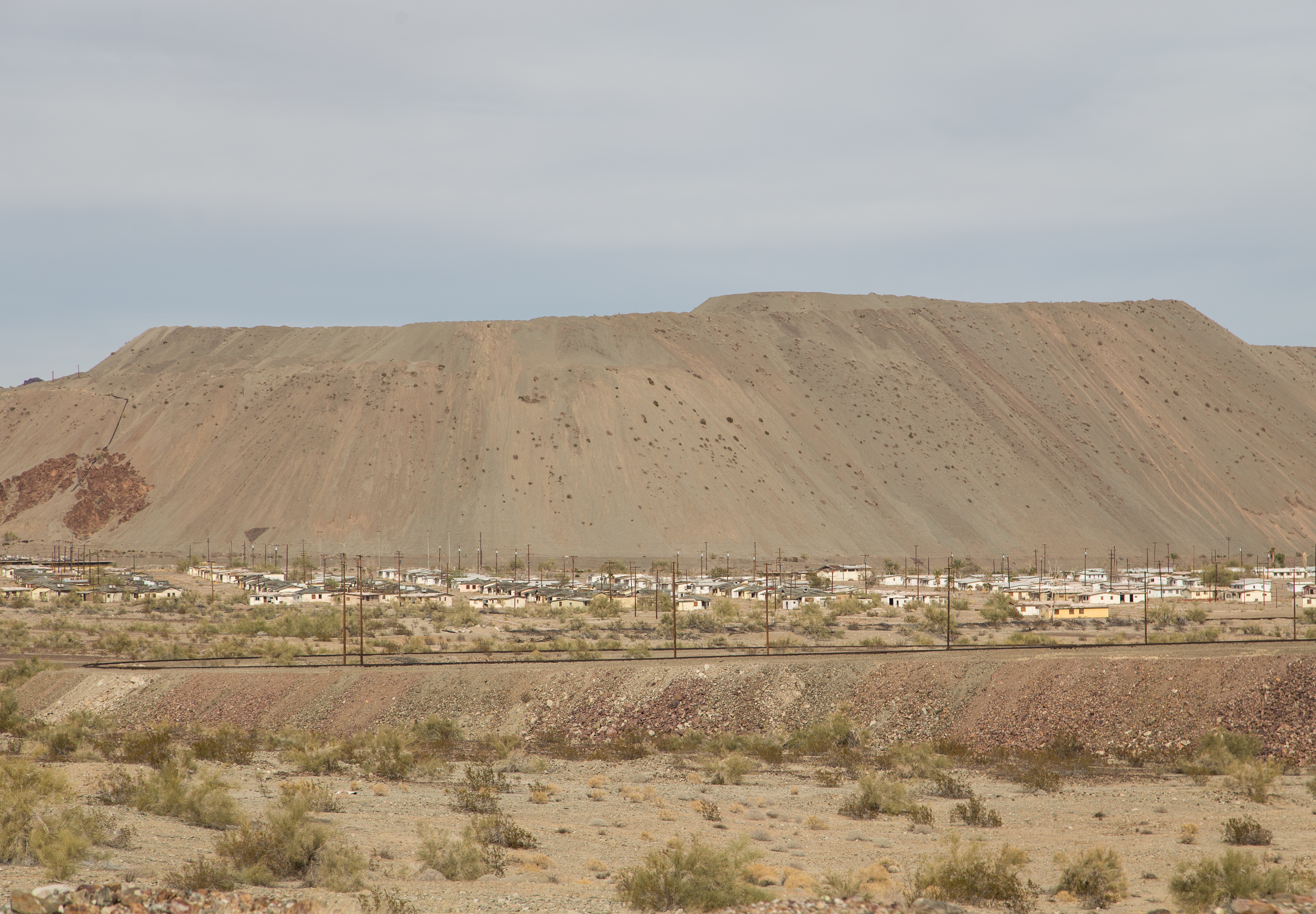

- Location within the state of California
- Coordinates: 33°51′27″N 115°29′14″W
- Country: United States
- State: California
- County: Riverside
- Elevation: 1,365 ft (416 m)
- Time zone: UTC-8 (Pacific (PST))
  - Summer (DST): UTC-7 (PDT)
- GNIS feature ID: 1660573

Eagle Mountain is a ghost town in the California desert in Riverside County founded in 1948 by industrialist Henry J. Kaiser. The town is located at the entrance of the now-defunct Eagle Mountain iron mine, once owned by the Southern Pacific Railroad, then Kaiser Steel, and located on the southeastern corner of Joshua Tree National Park. The town's fully integrated medical care system, similar to other Kaiser operations in California, was the genesis of the modern-day Kaiser Permanente health maintenance organization. Eagle Mountain is accessible by Kaiser Road (Riverside County Route R2) from California State Route 177, twelve miles (19 km) north of Desert Center, midway between Indio and the California/Arizona state line along Interstate 10.

== History ==
Founded in 1948 by Kaiser Steel Corporation, Eagle Mountain is located at the entrance of the now-defunct Eagle Mountain iron mine. As the mine expanded, Eagle Mountain grew to a peak population of 4000. It had wide, landscaped streets lined with over four hundred homes, some with as many as four bedrooms. Two hundred trailer spaces and several boarding houses and dormitories provided living space for Kaiser's itinerant workforce. Other amenities included an auditorium, a park, a shopping center, a community swimming pool, lighted tennis courts, and a baseball diamond. Businesses included a bowling alley, two gas stations, eight churches, and three schools. Workers across various crafts at the mine were represented for collective bargaining purposes in a single bargaining unit comprising 5 unions, including the Laborers' International Union of North America and the International Brotherhood of Teamsters.

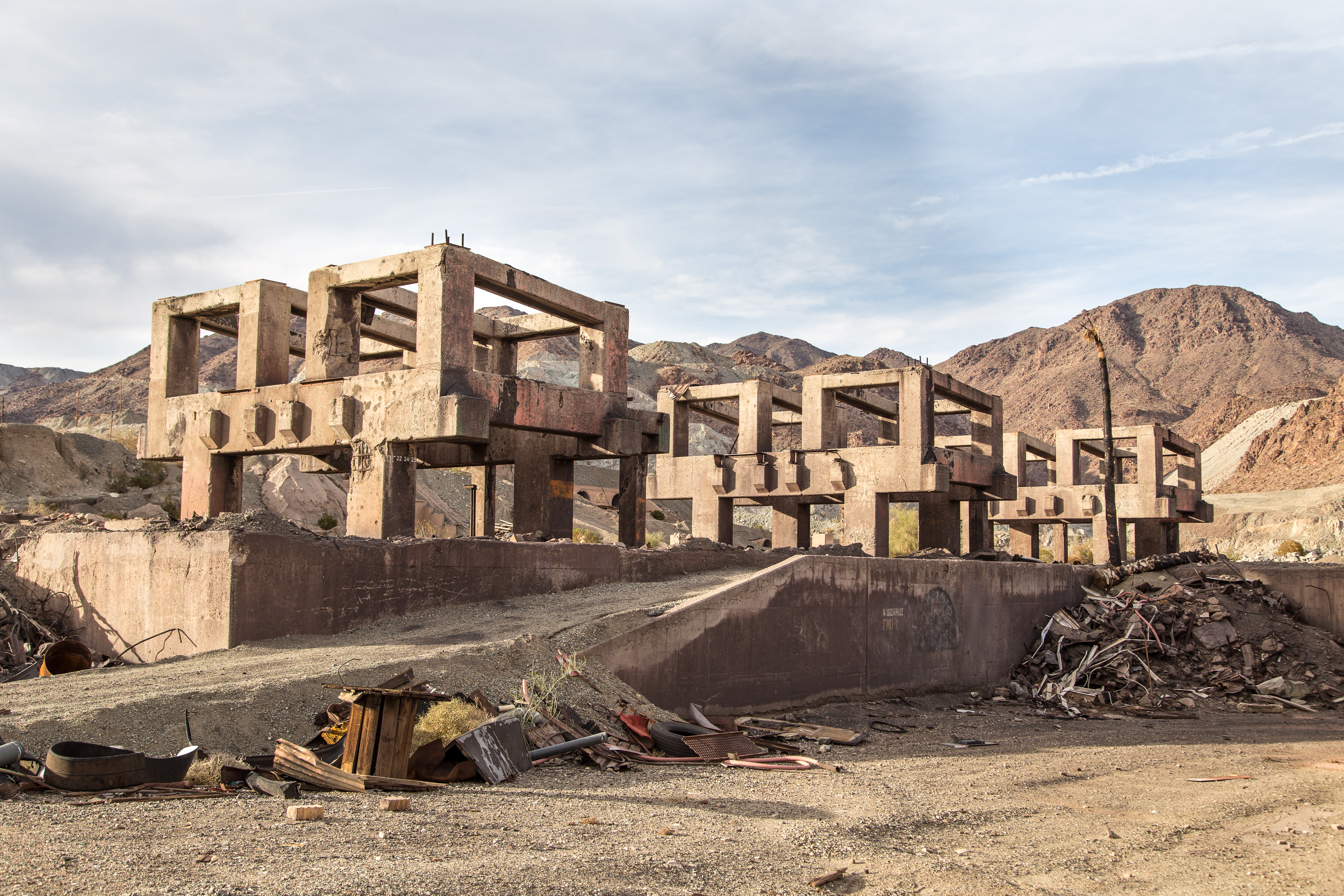
Kaiser Steel ruins in 2015

In the late 1930s, Kaiser built the West Coast's first fully integrated steel mill. In 1942, Kaiser built such a mill at Fontana, California, which is located 112 miles (180 km) west of the Eagle Mountain Mine. Today the Fontana mill site includes other successor mills and the Auto Club Speedway (formerly the California Speedway). Kaiser then purchased the idle mines from the Southern Pacific Railroad as a source of high-grade iron ore. This was a contingent strategy Kaiser used to utilize rail and raw materials for an industrial operation in a previously agricultural (pig farm) area.

Production at Fontana was initiated during WWII, increased iron shipments began in 1948, and a mining town was constructed below what was soon to become Southern California's largest iron mine. It connected to the Southern Pacific Railroad via a 51-mile-long (82-kilometer) railroad branch known as the Eagle Mountain Railroad. It ran southwest from the mine to the northeast shore of the Salton Sea, just north of the Riverside–Imperial county line. Ore shipments to the Fontana steel plant began in October, with five to eight 100-car trains running weekly. The mine's 100 millionth ton of iron ore shipped was commemorated in a ceremony on August 17, 1977.

=== Shutdown ===
Increased environmental concerns in the 1970s and stiff foreign competition led to a reduction in iron output and a drop in population to a low of 1980. In the summer of 1980, the mine shut down briefly, reopening on September 23. Only 750 workers were brought back to the town with an additional 150 (with uncertain employment futures) in Indio, some 60 miles (97 km) west.

On November 3, 1981, Kaiser Corporation announced the phasing out of half the Fontana works and the entire Eagle Mountain Mine operation over several years. The population dwindled as layoffs began. The grocery store closed in October 1982, and the post office, which had been active since 1951, closed in 1983. In June of that year, the last official graduating class celebrated their commencement at Eagle Mountain High School, followed by the closing of both the mine and mill.

The ZIP code was 92241 until Eagle Mountain shut down; mail is now sent to the nearby Desert Center at 92239. The community is within area codes 442 and 760.

=== Resurgence ===
Eagle Mountain experienced a resurgence in 1986 when the California Department of Corrections proposed placing a unique privately operated prison for low-risk inmates in the town. The shopping center was converted in 1988 into the Eagle Mountain Community Correctional Facility, which operated until state budget problems and a fatal riot led to the closing of the prison in December 2003. Talks resumed in 2005 to reopen the prison facility.

1988 also saw a proposal to turn the gigantic 1.5-mile-long (2.4-kilometer) by half-mile-wide (800 m) open-pit mine into a massive, high-tech sanitary landfill. The landfill, to be operated by a partnership of two privately operated trash collection firms and the successor to Kaiser Steel, Kaiser Ventures, would ship trash by train from metropolitan Los Angeles area via the Eagle Mountain Railroad. A company subsidiary, Mine Reclamation Corp. of Palm Desert, is the landfill developer. Due to numerous lawsuits regarding the environmental effects of the landfill, the project was repeatedly delayed. The private partnership decided in late 1999 to terminate the project. Their share of the project was bought by Kaiser Ventures, making it the controlling owner of the project.

The Riverside County Board of Supervisors approved the project in October 1992 after EPA approval of the project. In August 2000, Kaiser Ventures reached an agreement with the Los Angeles Sanitation District (LASD – a public entity comprising several public waste collection agencies), to purchase the landfill project as a replacement for the Puente Hills Landfill, which would be nearing the end of its useful life. Trash was to be shipped by rail from the Los Angeles area via the abandoned Eagle Mountain Railroad line. The sale agreement states that all lawsuits and claims regarding the project were to be resolved. As of 2008, there was one lawsuit pending. Much has changed in the waste business since 2000. A reduction in waste generated because of recycling has reduced the urgency for the new landfill. In addition, the Los Angeles Sanitation District purchased another landfill site in Imperial County. In May 2013, the LASD discontinued plans to convert the Eagle Mountain mine into a landfill.

A 1300 MW pumped-storage hydroelectricity plant was proposed by Eagle Crest Energy. The company agreed to buy the land from CIL&D (the new name of Kaiser Ventures) in July 2015. The Eagle Mountain Pumped Storage Project would pump groundwater from the Chuckwalla Valley aquifer into two reservoirs comprising former mining pits, where water would be pumped from the lower reservoir to the upper reservoir during low electricity demand and pumped back down through turbines during high electricity demand. In November 2016, NextEra Energy announced their partnership with Eagle Crest in the project. The project is praised by supporters for the purpose of bringing more renewable energy in California, while also being criticized by environmentalists for potential damages to plant and animal life in and around Joshua Tree National Park.

On April 17, 2023, the land and mining site were purchased for $22.5 million by California-based Ecology Mountain Holdings. It was previously owned by Eagle Mountain Acquisitions, one of the few mining subsidiaries that owned the land within the last 40 years. It is currently unknown what the company intends on doing with the area.

== Climate ==
According to the Köppen Climate Classification system, Eagle Mountain has a hot desert climate, abbreviated "BWh" on climate maps. The hottest temperature recorded in Eagle Mountain was 120 °F (48.9 °C) on June 26, 1970, while the coldest temperature recorded was 20 °F (−6.7 °C) on January 22, 1937.

Climate data for Eagle Mountain, California, 1991–2020 normals, extremes 1933–present
Month	Jan	Feb	Mar	Apr	May	Jun	Jul	Aug	Sep	Oct	Nov	Dec	Year
Record high °F (°C)	85 (29)	91 (33)	102 (39)	105 (41)	111 (44)	120 (49)	119 (48)	118 (48)	117 (47)	109 (43)	95 (35)	85 (29)	120 (49)
Mean maximum °F (°C)	74.7 (23.7)	78.3 (25.7)	87.5 (30.8)	95.6 (35.3)	102.2 (39.0)	109.6 (43.1)	112.8 (44.9)	110.5 (43.6)	105.5 (40.8)	97.4 (36.3)	84.9 (29.4)	73.8 (23.2)	113.7 (45.4)
Mean daily maximum °F (°C)	64.3 (17.9)	68.0 (20.0)	74.6 (23.7)	81.5 (27.5)	90.0 (32.2)	99.4 (37.4)	103.9 (39.9)	102.8 (39.3)	97.3 (36.3)	85.5 (29.7)	72.9 (22.7)	63.2 (17.3)	83.6 (28.7)
Daily mean °F (°C)	55.2 (12.9)	58.4 (14.7)	64.5 (18.1)	70.9 (21.6)	79.5 (26.4)	88.6 (31.4)	93.6 (34.2)	92.6 (33.7)	86.7 (30.4)	75.3 (24.1)	63.3 (17.4)	54.3 (12.4)	73.6 (23.1)
Mean daily minimum °F (°C)	46.1 (7.8)	48.8 (9.3)	54.5 (12.5)	60.2 (15.7)	68.9 (20.5)	77.8 (25.4)	83.4 (28.6)	82.5 (28.1)	76.2 (24.6)	65.1 (18.4)	53.8 (12.1)	45.5 (7.5)	63.6 (17.5)
Mean minimum °F (°C)	37.8 (3.2)	40.0 (4.4)	44.4 (6.9)	49.9 (9.9)	56.5 (13.6)	67.4 (19.7)	74.8 (23.8)	73.1 (22.8)	66.5 (19.2)	54.6 (12.6)	43.7 (6.5)	37.1 (2.8)	35.2 (1.8)
Record low °F (°C)	20 (−7)	29 (−2)	31 (−1)	40 (4)	45 (7)	47 (8)	64 (18)	63 (17)	51 (11)	37 (3)	35 (2)	25 (−4)	20 (−7)
Average precipitation inches (mm)	0.59 (15)	0.60 (15)	0.40 (10)	0.07 (1.8)	0.07 (1.8)	0.01 (0.25)	0.28 (7.1)	0.41 (10)	0.36 (9.1)	0.13 (3.3)	0.11 (2.8)	0.62 (16)	3.65 (92.15)
Average precipitation days (≥ 0.01 in)	2.7	2.8	2.0	0.9	0.3	0.1	1.2	1.8	1.5	1.1	0.9	1.8	17.1
Source 1: NOAA
Source 2: National Weather Service

== Schools ==
The Desert Center Unified School District at one time operated four schools in the Eagle Mountain and Desert Center areas. Eagle Mountain Elementary School was located in the center of the town, Henry J. Kaiser Junior High School and Eagle Mountain High School were located on the east, and Desert Center Elementary School was located in Desert Center, 11 miles away. The class of 1987 was the last to graduate from Eagle Mountain High School. In 1987, the school district converted the high school into the Eagle Mountain Elementary School, in operation since 1983, educating students in the grades kindergarten through 8th grade.

The remaining three school sites were closed and boarded up. Local high school students are bussed to Palo Verde High School in Blythe, California, making the 120-mile round trip every day. The remaining students in the school district are children of the few full-time residents of Desert Center and children of the employees of the two nearby Metropolitan Water District pumping plants.

== In popular culture ==
=== Film ===
A portion of the Eagle Mountain Railroad was used in the filming of the 1986 movie Tough Guys in a scene wherein a train is hijacked - pulled by a locomotive Southern Pacific 4449 - and run full throttle to the Mexican border. During the filming of the exterior shots of Southern Pacific 4449, the train was stored nightly at the Eagle Mountain rail yards. The local school children from Eagle Mountain School took a field trip in early 1986 to visit the train on the location of the shoot along the Eagle Mountain Railroad south of Interstate 10.

Other films using Eagle Mountain locations include

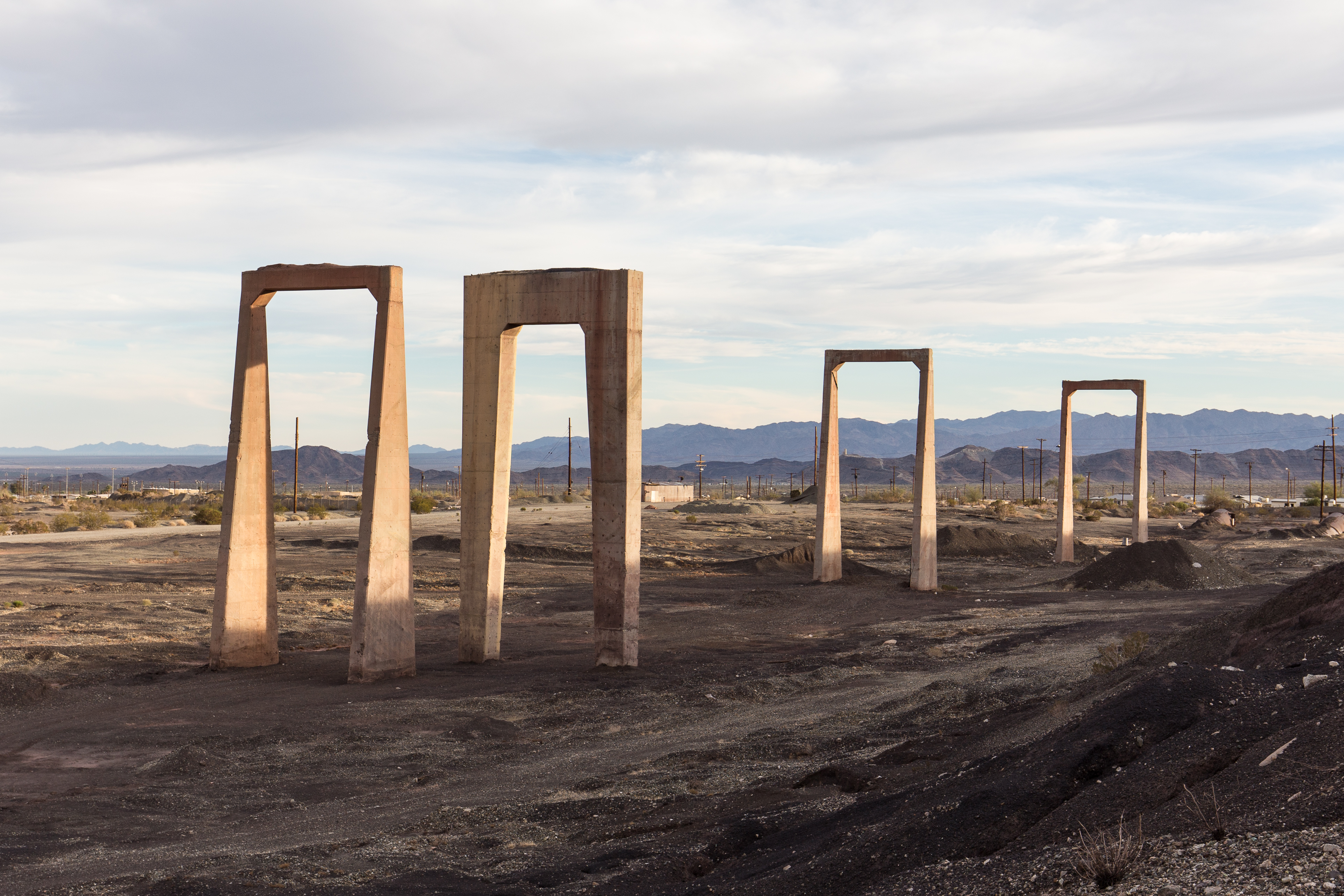
Characteristic concrete arches as seen in Tenet

- The Professionals (1966)
- T2-3D: Battle Across Time (1996)
- Impostor (2001)
- Live from Baghdad (2002)
- Constantine (2003)
- The Island (2005)
- Unknown (2006)
- Battle of Los Angeles (2011)
- Video Game High School (2012)
- Tenet (2020)

=== Television ===
Top Gear USA has used Eagle Mountain at least 3 times. In season 2's third episode, "America's Strongest Pickup," Eagle Mountain was used for the final challenge including pulling down a house. And episode 8 "Hollywood Cars" racing a Subaru WRX against a motorcycle. The final challenge in the 13th episode of Top Gear USA's third season was staged at Eagle Mountain. Entitled 'Doomsday Drive,' Eagle Mountain served as a stand-in for a post-apocalyptic setting.

== See also ==
- Desert Center, California
- List of ghost towns in California
- Colorado Desert topics
