= California county routes in zone R =

- Example of a California county route shield

Highway names
- County: County Route X (CR X) or Route X

System links
- County routes in California

There are two routes assigned to the "R" zone of the California Route Marker Program, which designates county routes in California. The "R" zone currently only includes county highways in Riverside County. A third "R" route in the county existed until 1970.

== R1 ==
County Road R1
- Location: Mountain Center – Banning
- Existed: 1966–1970

County Route R1 (CR R1) was a county route in Riverside County, California, United States. The route was converted into a state highway as SR 243 in 1970. Its southern end was at SR 74 in Mountain Center and its northern end was in Banning.

== R2 ==
County Road R2
- Kaiser Road
- Location: Desert Center – Eagle Mountain
- Length: 11.26 mi (18.12 km)
- Existed: 1964–present

County Route R2 (CR R2) is a county route in Riverside County, California, United States. The route is known as Kaiser Road. Its southern end is SR 177 near Desert Center, and its northern end is at Eagle Mountain, a modern-day ghost town. Eagle Mountain is not openly accessible; its perimeters have been fenced and gated, with a site manager appointed to handle access requests.

The road for CR R2 is named after the now defunct Kaiser Steel, which operated in Eagle Mountain. It was founded by industrialist Henry J. Kaiser, who is also best known as the founder of health maintenance organization Kaiser Permanente.

The route was defined in 1964, and has not been altered since then.

=== Major intersections ===
The entire route is in Riverside County.

Location	mi	km	Destinations	Notes
Desert Center	0.0	0.0	SR 177	Southern terminus
Eagle Mountain	11.26	18.12	Northern terminus	
1.000 mi = 1.609 km; 1.000 km = 0.621 mi

== R3 ==
County Road R3
- Location: Radec–Hemet
- Length: 23.45 mi (37.74 km)

County Route R3 (CR R3) is a county route in Riverside County, California, United States. The route is known as Sage Road, Cactus Valley Road, and State Street. Its southern end is SR 79 in Radec and its northern end is SR 74 / SR 79 (Florida Avenue) in Hemet.

At its north end in Hemet, it provides a major transportation route.

Historic information conflicts as to the date the route was defined. Some information indicates the highway was created in 1966, although other sources give a commissioning date of 1973. This is a former routing of SR 79.

=== Major intersections ===
The entire route is in Riverside County.

Location	mi	km	Destinations	Notes
Radec	0.0	0.0	SR 79 – Anza, Temecula	Southern terminus
Sage	5.1	8.2	Wilson Valley Road	
Hemet	20.0	32.2	Domenigoni Parkway / Gibbel Road	
Hemet	23.1	37.2	SR 74 / SR 79 (Florida Avenue)	Northern terminus
Hemet	23.1	37.2	State Street	Continuation beyond SR 74 / SR 79
1.000 mi = 1.609 km; 1.000 km = 0.621 mi
