= Camp Desert Center =

California Historic Landmark

- Location within California
- 33°44′03″N 115°22′40″W
- Location: Desert Center, California

History
- Built: June of 1942

Site notes
- Area: 34,000 acres (14,000 ha)
- Architect: US Army

California Historical Landmark
- Reference no.: 985

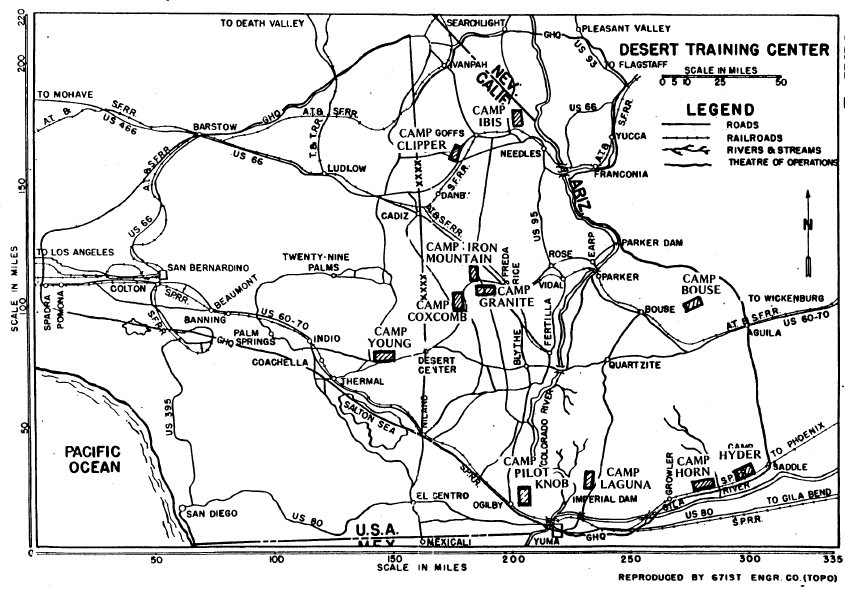
Map of Desert training center with Camp Desert Center

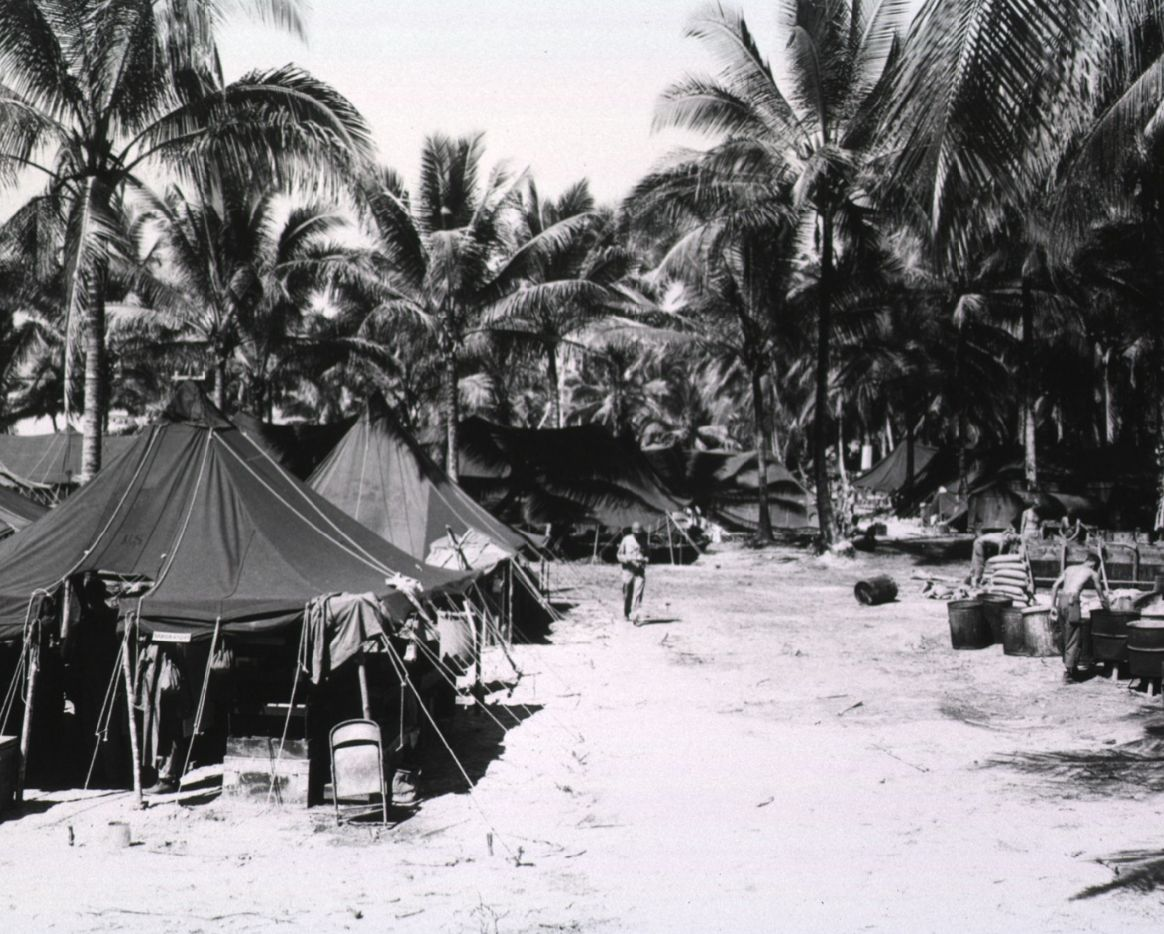
After departing the Camp Desert Center, the 92nd Evacuation Hospital in New Guinea in 1944

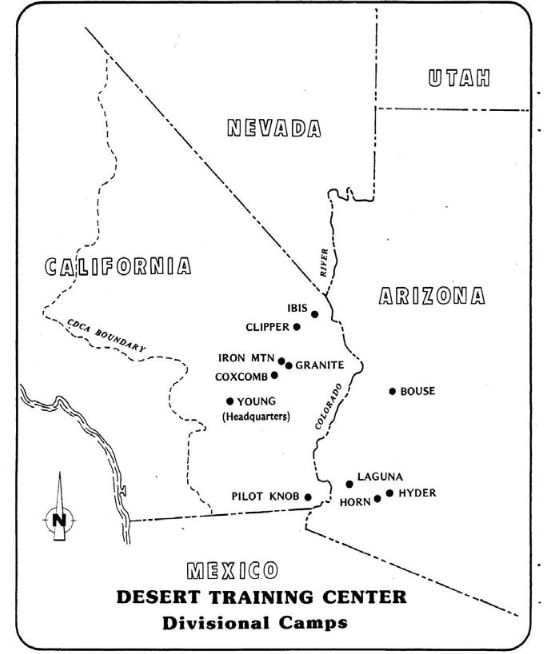
Desert Training Center map US Army 1943

The Camp Desert Center was a sub camp of the US Army, Desert Training Center in Riverside County, California. The main headquarters for the Desert Training Center was Camp Young, where General Patton's 3rd Armored Division was stationed. Camp Desert Center was at Desert Center, California, in Riverside County, California in the Colorado Desert.

This sub camp was in southern California, between the cities of Indio and Blythe, at the junction of Interstate 10 and State Route 177, about halfway between Phoenix and Los Angeles. It is located just south of Joshua Tree National Park near the Colorado River Aqueduct. Camp Granite was designated a California Historic Landmark (No.985).

Army divisions were not stationed at Camp Desert Center. Rather, the camp was used as a supply depot, maintenance repair depot, and an evacuation hospital run by the 92nd medical unit.

== History ==
Camp Desert Center was built in April 1942, to prepare troops to do battle in North Africa, fighting the Germans during World War II. When completed the camp had shower buildings, latrines, evacuation hospital, weather station (Type D), wooden tent frames, Ammo depot, Quartermaster store, water storage tanks and water treatment plant. The 18th Ordnance Battalion operated out of the camp. The camp was closed on 16 December 1944 and the US Army buildings was removed.

== 92nd Army medical unit ==
The 92nd Evacuation Hospital at Camp Desert Center was a 300-bed hospital. The Evacuation Hospital was in operation from May 1943 to December 1943 at Camp Desert Center. The 92nd medical unit had medical doctors, nurses and surgery room. Treating troop suffering from desert dehydration to emergence surgery.

Before arriving at Camp Desert Center the 92nd medical unit was stationed at the Camp Freda Hospital at the Camp Freda Quartermaster Depot. The 92nd medical unit used did not move out to the North African campaign like most of the thousands of troops that trained in the desert camps; it was transferred to fight in the South Pacific theatre of war. Its first actions were in the New Guinea campaign, the Battle of Luzon, and the Battle of Leyte. At the end of the war the 92nd was part of the occupation of Japan.

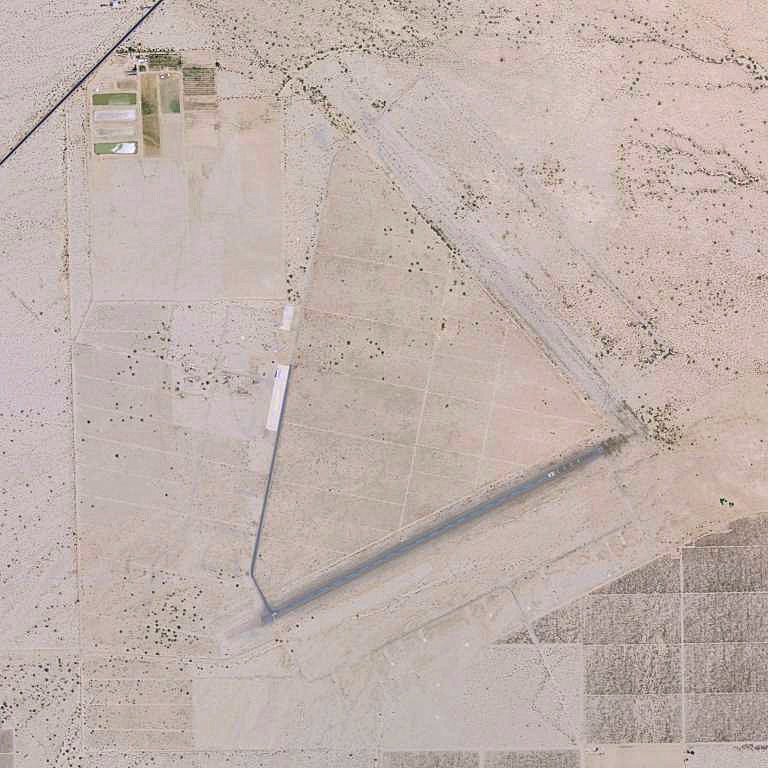
Camp Desert Airfield in 2006 from USGS

== Desert Center Army Air Field ==
The US Army Desert Center Army Air Field was built in 1942 with two 5,500 foot runways, near the Camp Desert Center. The 74th Reconnaissance Group was the first to use the Air Field, followed by the 377th Service Squadron, 475th Base Headquarters and 1111th Guard Squadron.

Over 40 buildings were built at the Army Air Field to support the training at the many desert camps. Desert Center Army Air Field was built about 5 miles northeast of Camp Desert Center. The Camp Desert Airfield air landing strip was used to support the camp reconnaissance activities and the evacuation hospital. In 1943 the 475th Base Headquarters & Air Base Squadron was headquartered here. Stationed at the Desert Center Army Air Field were: Curtiss O-52 Owl, Stinson L-1 Vigilant, Piper L-4, North American B-25 Mitchell, Bell P-39 Airacobra and Curtiss P-40 Warhawk. When the Camp Desert Center closed in 1944, the airfield was turned over to the Fourth Air Force who rarely used it; only occasional B-24 Liberator training flights from March Field landed at Camp Desert Airfield.

After the war the field was renamed Desert Center Airport (CN64). At the end of its military use, the airfield was turned over to the Army Corps of Engineers. It was later sold and is now a private-use airport.

== See also ==
- Camp Hyder
- Camp Bouse
- Camp Coxcomb
- California during World War II
- Muroc Maru
