= Chuckwalla Valley =

Valley in Riverside County, California, United States

- Location within California
- Length: 48 mi (77 km) WNW-ESE
- Width: 16 mi (26 km)

Geography
- Country: United States
- State: California
- Region: Mojave Desert
- County: Riverside
- Communities: Desert Center; Eagle Mountain
- Borders on: List: Palen Lake; Palen Valley; Palen Mountains; McCoy Mountains; Palo Verde Valley; Little Chuckwalla Mountains; Mule Mountains; Chuckwalla Mountains; Eagle Mountains; Desert Lily Preserve; Coxcomb Mountains
- Coordinates: 33°38′27″N 115°01′08″W
- Interactive map of Chuckwalla Valley

The Chuckwalla Valley is a large valley in eastern Riverside County, California, named for a large lizard, the chuckwalla found in the arid Southwestern United States deserts.

The region of the valley in southeast California, is the low elevation section of the Mojave Desert transitioning into the Colorado Desert, the northwest extension (in California) of the Sonoran Desert. The region is notable for valleys containing bajadas, sand dunes, and intermittent, dry, or saline lakes. Chuckwalla Valley contains Ford Lake (Ford Dry Lake) in the east-southeast; Palen Lake (Palen Dry Lake) occurs in the center-northwest, at the south terminus of the smaller, north–south Palen Valley.

The south end of the valley expands slightly northwest-by-southeast, and contains Danby Dry Lake, a 13-mi (21 km) long dry lake, or playa. Mountain ranges surround the valley on all sides. The neighboring valleys eastward over the mountain ranges, Chemehuevi Valley, Vidal Valley, and Rice Valley are all western tributary valleys to the south-flowing Colorado River along the Lower Colorado River Valley corridor.

The center of the valley is approximately just east of the Oro Plata Mine at the east of the Old Woman Mountains.

== Geography ==
The map of California showing the location of Ward Valley, also shows the low elevation green, low valleys, south of the 'map location point'. The northwest-by-southeast section, contains the three dry lake beds, from west to east: Bristol Lake, Cadiz Dry Lake, and Danby Lake.

Geographically, the entire region of Ward Valley is a transition from higher elevation bajadas and mountain ranges of the Mojave Desert, to lower elevation sections of Mojave Desert, and the northwest region of the Sonoran Desert in southeast California, called the Colorado Desert. The region has mostly arid mountain ranges, bajadas, flatlands, sand dune fields (from prevailing, seasonal winds), and playas (salt-flats).

The lengthy north section of Ward Valley is drained by one major wash, named Homer Wash. Its outfall end, due to scant rainfall, and distance from Danby Lake, ends about 5-mi from the north side of the lake (ground infiltration).

== See also ==
- Desert Center, California
- Valleys of Riverside County
