= California State Route 177 =

Highway in California

State Route 177
- Rice Road
- SR 177 highlighted in red

Route information
- Maintained by Caltrans
- Length: 27.024 mi (43.491 km)

Major junctions
- South end: I-10 near Desert Center
- North end: SR 62 near Rice

Location
- Country: United States
- State: California
- County: Riverside

Highway system
- State highways in California; Interstate; US; State; Scenic; History; Pre‑1964; Unconstructed; Deleted; Freeways
← SR 176	→ SR 178

State Route 177 (SR 177) is a state highway in the U.S. state of California in Riverside County. The route runs along Rice Road, linking Interstate 10 (I-10) midway between the Coachella Valley and Blythe on the California–Arizona border, to SR 62 near Rice. SR 177 travels along the eastern portion of the Joshua Tree National Park; like the eastern 100 miles (160 km) of SR 62, it passes through some of the most desolate areas of the Mojave Desert.

== Route description ==
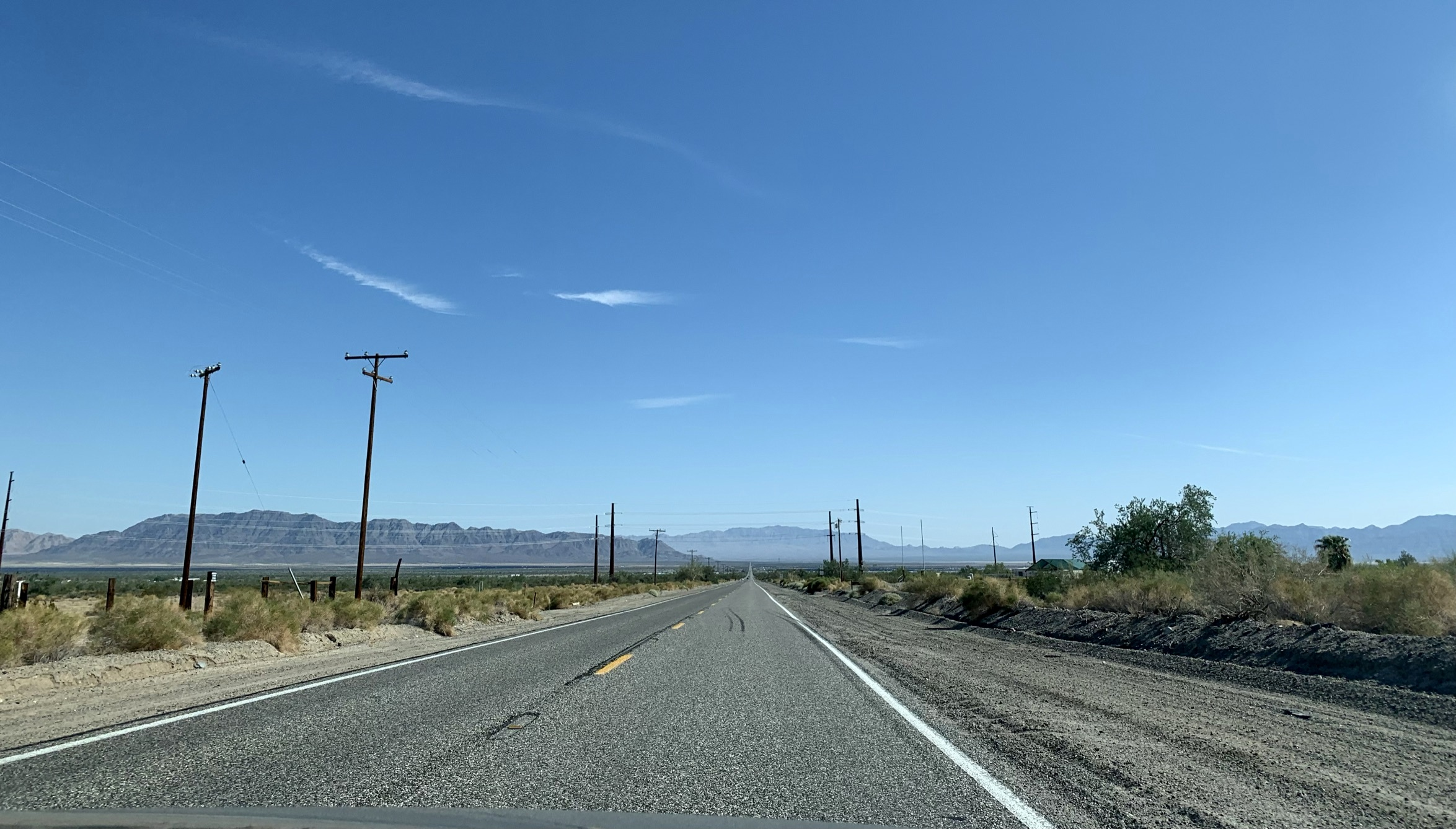
SR 177 near Desert Center

Route 177 is defined in section 477 of the California Streets and Highways Code, and that the highway is "from Route 10 near Desert Center to Route 62 near Granite Pass".

SR 177 begins at I-10 near Desert Center and briefly travels north, intersecting with CR R2. At this intersection, SR 177 turns northeast and travels across the Mojave Desert, through the Chuckwalla Valley. It passes near the Desert Center Airport and comes near Palen Lake, a dry lake. The highway passes along the southeastern boundary of Joshua Tree National Park before turning due north and crossing the desert for several miles. SR 177 briefly turns northeast again before intersecting with SR 62 and defaulting onto SR 62 eastbound.

The route is two lanes wide for its entire length. SR 177 is not part of the National Highway System, a network of highways that are considered essential to the country's economy, defense, and mobility by the Federal Highway Administration. In 2013, SR 177 had an annual average daily traffic (AADT) of 1,200 at the northern terminus with SR 62, and 3,700 at the southern terminus with I-10, the latter of which was the highest AADT for the highway.

== History ==
The Metropolitan Water District built a road from Desert Center that ran north before turning east to Earp along with portions of the Colorado River Aqueduct from February 20 to August 4, 1933. This was part of a road system that was built in order to support the construction of the aqueduct by connecting the camps that construction workers resided in during the project. This road cost $389,600 (about $7 million in 2024 dollars) to construct; the roads in the system were paved. SR 177 was added to the state highway system in 1972 by the California State Legislature. As of 1998, Caltrans had no plans to expand the highway, considering it to be "maintain only" through 2015.

== Major intersections ==
Except where prefixed with a letter, postmiles were measured on the road as it was when the route was established, based on the alignment that existed at the time, and do not necessarily reflect current mileage. Postmile prefixes include: R reflecting a realignment in the route since then, M indicating a second realignment, L referring to an overlap due to a correction or change, and T indicating postmiles classified as temporary. Segments that remain unconstructed or have been relinquished to local control may be omitted. The entire route is in Riverside County.

Location	Postmile	Destinations	Notes
	0.00	I-10 – Blythe, Indio	Interchange; south end of SR 177; I-10 exit 192; road continues as Desert Center Rice Road
	0.26	Kaiser Road (CR R2) – Lake Tamarisk	Southern terminus of CR R2; Lake Tamarisk also accessible southbound via Oasis Road
	27.02	SR 62 (Twentynine Palms Highway, Rice Road) – Rice, Parker, Twentynine Palms	North end of SR 177
1.000 mi = 1.609 km; 1.000 km = 0.621 mi
