= Radec, California =

Unincorporated community in California, United States

Coordinates: 33.4642°N 116.9139°W

Radec
- Unincorporated community
- Interactive map of Radec
- First settled: 1883
- Founder: Samuel V. Tripp
- Named for: "Cedar" spelled backwards
- Elevation: 520 m (1,706 ft)
- Time zone: UTC-8 (PST)
  - Summer (DST): UTC-7 (PDT)
- Zip code: 92536
- Area code: 951
- FIPS code: 06-59150
- GNIS feature ID: 252960

Radec is a small unincorporated community in Riverside County, California, United States. Located roughly 15 miles east by southeast of the city of Temecula, the community of Radec (an anadrome of "Cedar") is located at the junction of Highway 79 and County Route R3. Having bought land in the area in 1883, early settler Samuel Tripp set up a post office there. As of 1893–94, a local directory listed the area as growing honey, hay and stock, but also as having "no commercial interest of any kind." A total of 14 people, mainly farmers and beekeepers, plus a laborer and Tripp, are listed in the directory. The County of Riverside owns a small, non-operational cemetery in Radec.

== See also ==
- List of geographic names derived from anagrams and ananyms
