= Chuckwalla Valley Raceway =

Motorsport venue in California. United States

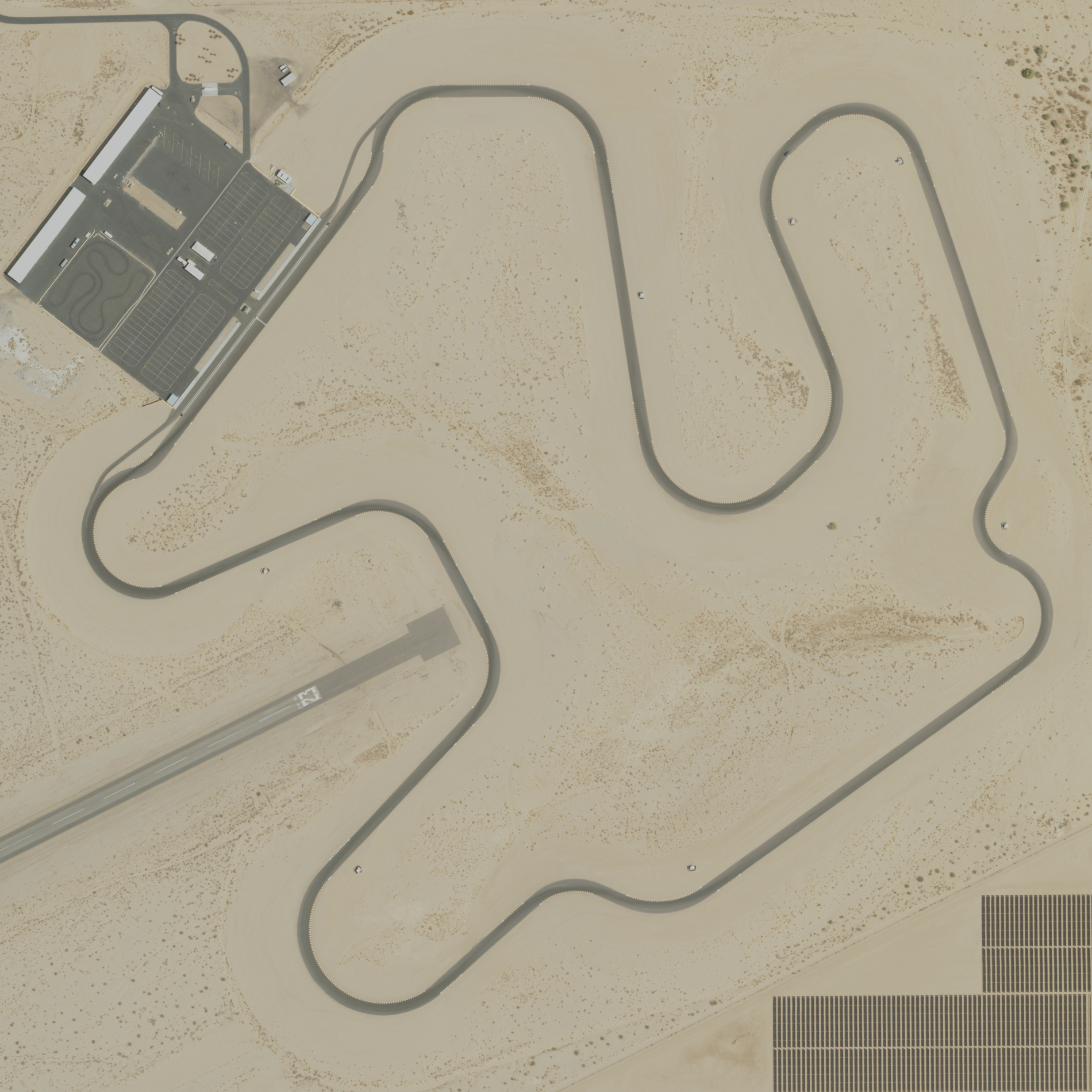
- 2022 aerial photo
- Location: 25300 Rice Road; Desert Center, California 92239
- Coordinates: 33°45′13″N 115°19′11″W
- Opened: 2010
- Architect: Ed Bargy

Combined track
- Surface: Asphalt
- Length: 4.31 km (2.68 mi)
- Turns: 17

Chuckwalla Valley Raceway (often referred to simply as Chuckwalla) is a motorsports road course located in Desert Center near Joshua Tree National Park in Southern California that first opened in 2010.

The track is a paved surface 2.68 miles (4.31 km) in length consisting of 17 turns. It is run in both clockwise and counter-clockwise configurations and the track contains numerous elevation changes.

== History ==
The 1,000 acre dry-lakebed property was formerly part of a training ground for General George Patton's soldiers during World War II. The track resides on the former main air supply depot. The transcontinental radio beacon tower still remains. After the war, the property was used as farmland and there were plans to convert the land into a waterskiing and wakeboarding facility with waterfront real estate however those plans were eliminated during the Great Recession. It was subsequently turned into a road course which opened in 2010. In February 2026, Chuckwalla Raceway was listed for sale with an asking price of $26,000,000.
