= Eagle Mountain Railroad =

Private railroad in Riverside County, California, United States

Overview
- Locale: Riverside County, California
- Dates of operation: July 29, 1948–April 8, 1986

Technical
- Track gauge: 4 ft 8 1/2 in (1,435 mm) standard gauge

The Eagle Mountain Railroad (EMRR) was a private carrier in California, owned by the Kaiser Steel Corporation, and is owned today by Kaiser Steel's successor, Kaiser Ventures, Inc. of Ontario, California.

The EMRR is 51 miles (82 km) long and is located in Riverside County, California. Constructed in 1947–1948, it was used until 1986 to haul iron ore from Kaiser's Eagle Mountain Mine in the California Desert to an interchange with the Southern Pacific Transportation Company in the Coachella Valley. The last revenue train to operate over the line was on March 24, 1986.

== Route ==
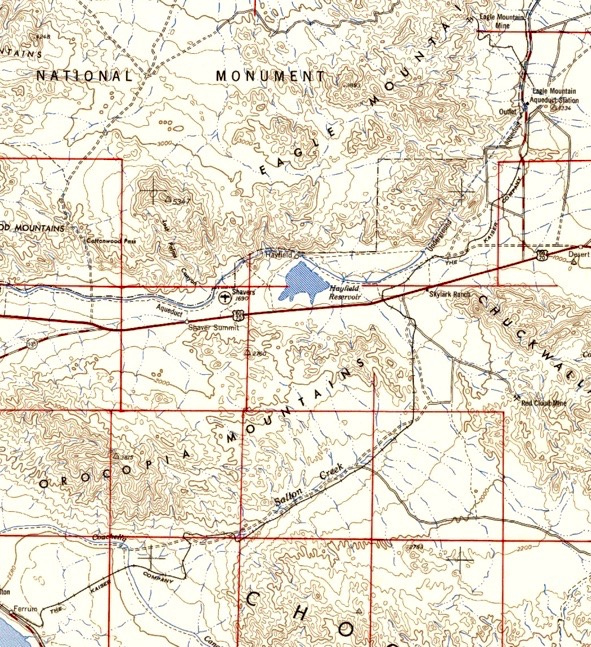
Route in 1963

The Eagle Mountain Railroad starts at a remote location called "Ferrum" (Latin for iron) which is located adjacent to the Salton Sea in Riverside County, and terminates 51 miles (82 km) away at the Eagle Mountain Mine (also known as Iron Chief Mine).

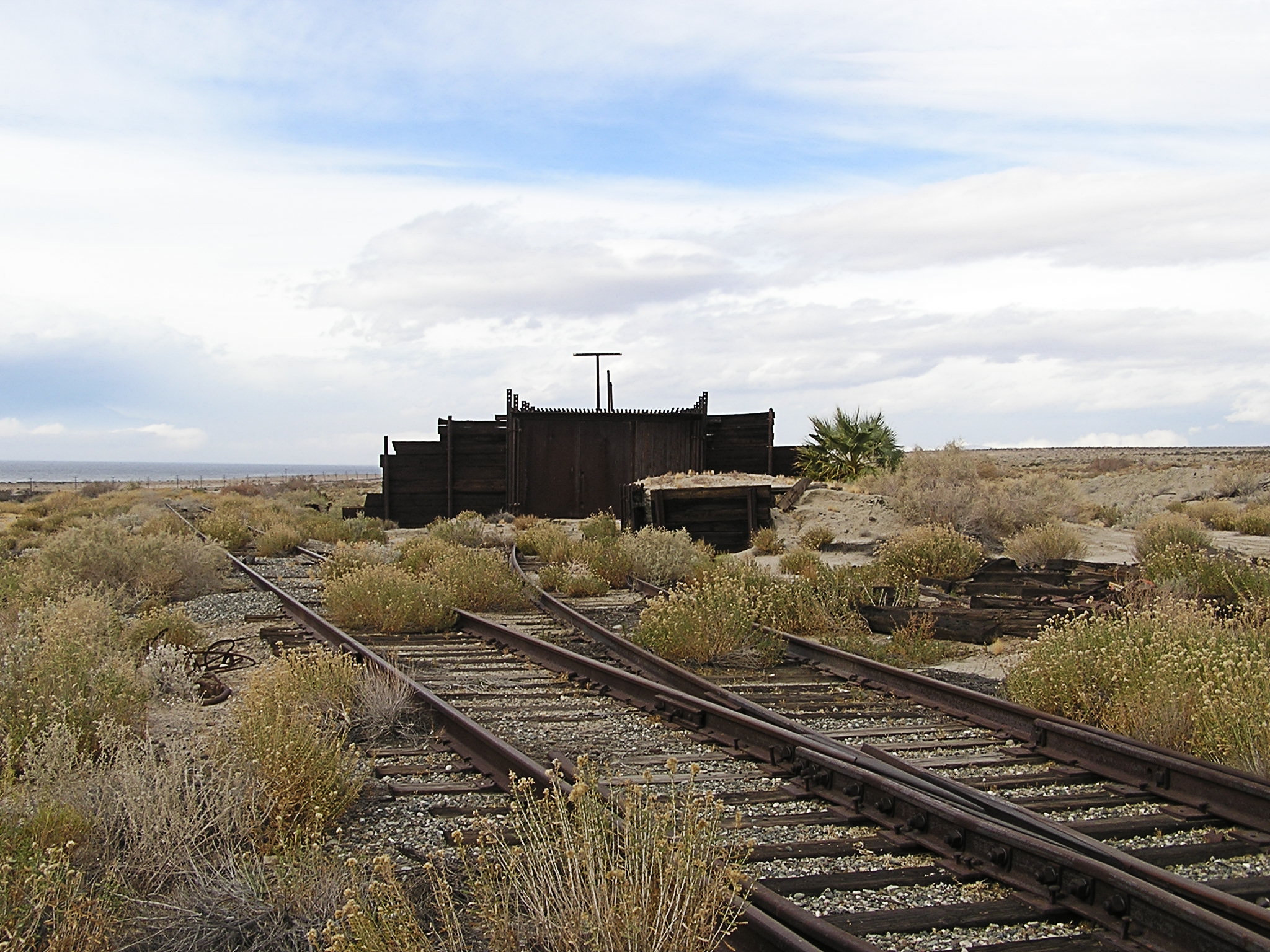
A maintenance equipment shed stands at the entrance to the former interchange yard at Ferrum on the Eagle Mountain Railroad (c. 2006)

Ferrum was the location of a five track yard that was used to interchange with the Southern Pacific Railroad. Also located at Ferrum is a wye (still connected) and maintenance equipment shed. The interchange yard parallels the present-day Union Pacific Railroad Yuma Subdivision main line, the main transcontinental railroad line between California and Texas. The main track heading to Eagle Mountain starts at the east end of the yard.

Upon leaving the Ferrum interchange yard, the track immediately climbs a hill, then descends to a wooden trestle. The track then heads east over mudflats while ascending a grade. There is a wooden trestle over Dos Palmas Wash. The track crosses over the rebuilt Coachella Canal. The canal passes under the track in a concrete siphon. The track crosses the abandoned original channel of the Coachella Canal on a three span steel bridge. While the bridge remains, water no longer flows beneath.

The tracks continue climbing the mudflats east where they turn north on a sweeping curve. Continuing north, the tracks cross the Bradshaw Trail before passing through a small cut and entering the first of two horseshoe curves. After this horseshoe curve, the tracks run east along the foothills of the Chocolate Mountains while the Salt Creek Wash parallels the tracks on the south side.

After curving along the Chocolate Mountains for two miles (3.2 km), the tracks turn south and cross the Salt Creek Wash on the railroad's longest bridge. The "Salt Creek Wash Bridge" is 500 feet (150 m) long and 40 feet (12 m) high. The original bridge located here was a wooden trestle. After a fire destroyed that bridge an all-steel bridge was constructed. After the bridge, the track enters the second or upper horseshoe curve. At the start of the horseshoe curve, the track is located on a high fill; by the end of the curve, the track is located in a deep cut.

The tracks head northeast with the Salt Creek Wash paralleling the line on the north side. The tracks cross numerous small washes with either small wooden bridges or cast iron culverts allowing water to pass. At Milepost 20, the uphill grade remained at a constant 2.0% ever since before Milepost 4.

The railroad reaches the top of the long climb from Ferrum at "Summit", which is located at Milepost 25. A 3,000 feet (910 m) long passing siding and a short storage spur are located here. A maintenance shed is also located here.

After Summit, the track begins a long down hill run that will go almost the entire way to Eagle Mountain. Just past Summit, the tracks turn north and head towards Interstate 10. Just prior to crossing under Interstate 10, there are three small maintenance sheds. The "Interstate 10 Underpass" is located at the Red Cloud Road Exit. After the underpass, the tracks curve east and start running along the foothills of the Eagle Mountains. At Milepost 35.8 is "Entrance", the location of a short 450-foot (140 m) storage track. Shortly after Entrance, the tracks curve north again and head for the Victory Hills. Just before arriving at the Victory Hills, the tracks cross Eagle Mountain Road, the original access road to the mine. This is the first paved road (other than Interstate 10) that the railroad has crossed.

The Victory Hills are a chain of small hills that run east of the Eagle Mountains and provide a minor obstacle to the railroad. The railroad passes through these through a deep cut in the low part between two hills. After crossing Eagle Mountain Road for a second time, the tracks arrive at "Telephone Pass". The railroad today passes between the same two mountains. Telephone Pass is the end of the downhill grade from Summit and for here to the mine is all uphill.

The uphill climb from Telephone Pass to the Eagle Mountain Mine is called "Caution Hill" and is so named because its 2.15% grade is the steepest on the line and descending it with a loaded ore train required great caution. It got its name after a loaded train ran away here in the early days of the railroad. All loaded ore trains descending Caution Hill were restricted to 15 mph (24 km/h) and were required to come to a complete stop at the bottom for 5 minutes to cool their brakes before proceeding. During the climb up to Eagle Mountain, the tracks cross Eagle Mountain Road for a third time and then cross Aqueduct Road. Immediately after Aqueduct Road, the railroad crosses an underground section of the Colorado River Aqueduct. There were fears that vibrations from the heavy trains would damage the underground concrete aqueduct, so the railroad crosses the aqueduct on a 50-foot (15 m) steel bridge. While this bridge appears to cross over nothing since the desert sand covering the aqueduct covers the lower part of the bridge, its serves a vital function. As the tracks approach Eagle Mountain, they cross Eagle Mountain Road for the fourth and final time before looping around the base of the mountains and arriving at the Eagle Mountain Mine.

"Eagle Mountain Mine" is located at Milepost 51.0 with the end of track located at Milepost 51.3. There are four long tracks used in the loading ore process located here, along with a two track maintenance shop, a wye, and a few storage tracks. All the railroad facilities are located immediately west of the Eagle Mountain townsite.

== Traffic ==
- Iron ore
- Mining equipment and supplies

== History ==
Kaiser Steel Corporation was incorporated on December 1, 1941, for the purpose of manufacturing steel in Southern California. The finished steel was needed to supply the various shipbuilding facilities controlled by Henry J. Kaiser on the west coast. These facilities were building ships for the British government and were using costly eastern steel that was in short supply. After obtaining the $125 million needed, construction of the mill in Fontana, California, began. In August 1943, the first plate steel rolled off the production line there.

Coal for this early production came from Utah Fuel Company Mine No. 2 at Sunnyside, Utah, and was transported to the mill via the Union Pacific Railroad. In 1950, Kaiser Steel purchased the entire Sunnyside, Utah facility. In 1955, Kaiser purchased 500,000 acres (2,000 km^{2}) of land near Raton, New Mexico, for future expanded coal production. The existing mine at this Raton location, named the Koehler Mine, was operated and upgraded until a newer and more modern mine could be completed. This new mine, named York Canyon Mine, served as the major source of coking coal until the Fontana Mill closed in 1983.

Also needed for the production of steel was limestone. Until 1955, this material was purchased from various sources in California and Nevada. In that year Kaiser Steel purchased a large deposit located at Cushenbury, California, 75 miles (121 km) from the Fontana Mill. The limestone was transported to the Fontana Mill by the Santa Fe Railway.

The last ingredient needed for the steelmaking process was a reliable source of iron ore. Kaiser Steel purchased the Vulcan Mine located near Kelso, California, which served as the primary source of ore until 1948. The Union Pacific Railroad transported the iron ore from Kelso to the Fontana Mill. This ore was not of sufficient quality to satisfy Kaiser, and a better source was sought. In 1944 Kaiser Steel purchased the Eagle Mountain mining claim from the Southern Pacific Railroad and began development of the Eagle Mountain Mine after the end of World War II.

=== Construction and operation ===
Construction of 52-mile (84 km) long Eagle Mountain Railroad began in August 1947. This included 50 miles (80 km) of main line from Ferrum Junction (changed in 1956 to just Ferrum) to the mine yard and another two miles (3.2 km) of mine trackage. This was one of the longest privately built standard gauge railroads constructed in the American Southwest in the post World War II era. The line was completed on July 29, 1948, at a cost of $3.2 million. In August 1948 the first carloads of raw iron ore rolled over the newly-laid rails.

The railroad was originally constructed with 110-pound per yard jointed rail laid on wooden crossties. Later welded rail was tried but difficulties in retrieving this rail after flooding resulted in the railroad switching back to jointed rail. By 1980, 119-pound per yard rail was used in tangent sections while heavier 136-pound per yard rail was used in the majority of the curves.

During early operations, ore was loaded into Southern Pacific gondola and open-top hopper cars of 50-, 60- and 70-ton capacity. Starting in 1958, these cars were replaced by about 700 closed-bottom 100-ton ore cars. These cars were constructed by Southern Pacific at its Sacramento, California shops. During the 1960s, these cars were modified to give them increased height, needed to carry pelletized ore (which was less dense) and this increased car loadings to 108 tons. From the early 1960s until the early 1970s, two loaded 100-car trains left the mine each day, seven days a week. One train carried the iron ore needed for the Fontana Mill while the second train handled ore to Long Beach, California, where it was shipped to oversea steel mills.

From the early 1970s until the early 1980s, one 100-car train was dispatched to the Fontana Mill each and every day. By 1982, operations varied from three to five trains per week, with as few as 40 carloads per train. After a short suspension of operations in early 1985, trains were run once a week until the complete discontinuance of operation in March 1986.

=== Loading ore ===
Loading the railcars with the processed iron ore at Eagle Mountain was fairly simple and required no locomotives to be used. An arriving train of up to 101 empty ore cars would be placed on one of two "incline" tracks. These incline tracks were specifically laid out so that the end of the track furthest from the ore loading tower would be the track's highest point and would gradually drop downgrade to the ore loading tower. When loading operations started, four cars at a time were cut off from the empty ore train and allowed to roll downhill the short distance to the loading tower where they were loaded, two cars at a time.

Once four cars were loaded, they were allowed to roll downhill to a special section of track called the "Reverser Track". As the cars rolled onto the Reverser Track, they would immediately start rolling uphill until they came to a stop and started rolling backward. They would then pass over a spring-loaded switch that would send the four loaded cars to one of two "saucer" tracks. These tracks were laid with the curvature of a saucer, with each end higher than middle. The cars would roll into the saucer track and settle at the bottom. When the next four loaded cars arrived, they would couple to the cars already there without damaging the cars and the entire line of cars would be evenly settled on the saucer track.

=== Movies ===
In January–February 1966, Columbia Pictures filmed many scenes for the motion picture The Professionals on the railroad. This action western starred Burt Lancaster, Lee Marvin, Robert Ryan, Woody Strode, Jack Palance and Claudia Cardinale. The basic story involved four men, each with unique talents, being hired by a millionaire to rescue his wife, who was kidnapped by a Mexican bandit. The movie makes extensive use of ex-Great Western steam locomotive No. 75, which stands in for both an American and Mexican locomotive. The scenes where the four men cross the border at a wooden bridge is actually the first railroad bridge north of Ferrum. The large steel bridge over the Salt Creek Wash was repainted to appear as a wooden bridge since the movie is set around 1910. Other scenes were shot at Gravel Pit and Summit. An ex-Southern Pacific caboose and a couple old wooden boxcars were used along with a Kaiser Steel flatcar for the various trains seen in the movie.

In March–April 1986, Touchstones Films, a Walt Disney subsidiary, filmed the movie Tough Guys on a portion of the railroad. This comedy starred Burt Lancaster, Kirk Douglas, Eli Wallach and Dana Carvey. It was the final collaboration for Burt Lancaster and Kirk Douglas. They play a pair of train robbers that have been released from prison after 30 years. Unable to survive in a changed world, they decide to rob the same train that they robbed 30 years ago. At the end of the film, they hijack the "Gold Coast Flyer" pulled by famed locomotive Southern Pacific 4449, and run it full throttle to the Mexican border.

The special train used in the film consisted of Southern Pacific 4449, its auxiliary water car, and four passenger cars. It departed its home base in Portland, Oregon, on March 5 and arrived in Los Angeles on March 9. Over the next four days, the interior of one passenger car was redone by Touchstone crews since it would appear in one scene. In addition, two Southern Pacific flatcars were added to the train and a mockup of the 4449's cab was placed on one of them. This mockup was used for some cab shots, since it was easier to move the camera around in it than in the real thing. Over the eight days between March 14 and March 21, several scenes were filmed at Southern Pacific's Taylor Yard.

On March 31, 1986, the seven car special train departed Los Angeles at 10:00am and arrived on the Eagle Mountain Railroad at Ferrum around 6:00 pm. About one hour later it arrived at the movie set that had been constructed at Summit. The train spent the night here. The next day, April 1, the Southern Pacific 4449 along with one passenger car and its auxiliary water tender headed for Eagle Mountain for water. After filling up with water, the shortened train returned to Summit. The following day, April 2, saw the start of nine days of filming on the railroad. Scenes were shot between the Coachella Canal Bridge and Summit. Filming required numerous run-bys and hours of waiting. During the last few days of filming, the water supply on board the locomotive started to run low, so a pair of Kaiser Steel U30C's picked up the auxiliary water tender, took it to Eagle Mountain where it was refilled with water and then returned to Summit later in the day.

Near the end of the movie, it appears that 4449 runs off the end of the track into the dirt, then the actors emerge from the cab. This was done using another full-sized fiberglass/wood mockup, this time of both the engine and tender. This mockup can still be seen through the windows of a garage building adjacent to the cafe in Desert Center, CA.

During the filming, the local school children from Eagle Mountain Elementary School took a field trip to see and tour the train and movie set, with miniatures, at Summit. Filming wrapped up on April 10, and that afternoon the train headed to Eagle Mountain for servicing. The next day, April 11, the special train backed all the way to Ferrum where the train was turned around before heading to Colton, California. It arrived back in Portland on April 16.

=== Closure ===
In the late 1970s increased environmental concerns at the Fontana Mill and stiff foreign competition resulted in decreased demand for Kaiser Steel products and thus resulted in a reduction of output at the Eagle Mountain Mine. This dropped the population at Eagle Mountain to a low of 1,890 residents. In Summer 1980, the mine shutdown briefly, reopening on September 23. Only 750 workers were brought back to the town with 150 on furlough.

On November 3, 1981, Kaiser Steel announced the phasing out of half the Fontana Mill and the closure of the entire Eagle Mountain Mine over the next few years. The population dwindled as layoffs began. The grocery store closed in October, 1982 and the post office, which had been active since 1951, closed in January, 1983. In June 1983, the last official graduating class celebrated their commencement at Eagle Mountain High School, followed by closing of both the mine and mill a few months later.

The Eagle Mountain Railroad saw a reduction on operations that mirrored the reduced production at the mine. During the early 1980s, the railroad was only operating a single ore train three to five times per week, with each train consisting of as few as 40 cars. When the mine closed in 1983, the railroad was barely operating three trains per week.

While the Eagle Mountain Mine had stopped all mining activity in 1983, there was still a significant stockpile of processed iron ore sitting on the ground in Eagle Mountain. It was decided to ship this product out since it was high-quality concentrated iron-ore, which is very valuable. The railroad operated two trains per week from mid-1983 until early 1985 when operations shutdown for a brief time. When operations resumed, only a single train operated per week, usually 50 to 60 cars in length. Once the stockpiled ore was gone, the railroad shut down. The last ore train operated on March 24, 1986, when 20 cars of ore where shipped out. Once filming of the Tough Guys movie was completed, the last two remaining locomotives were sent to the Fontana Mill.

== Redevelopment ==
=== Correctional facility ===
Shortly after the last iron ore had been shipped out in 1986, the California Department of Corrections proposed placing a privately operated prison for low-risk inmates at Eagle Mountain. In 1988, Management and Training Corporation, an operator of several privately run prisons, converted the old shopping center into just such a facility. State budget problems and a fatal riot led to the closure of the prison on December 31, 2003. Although there were talks to reopen the facility in 2005, no agreement was reached to do so.

=== Waste site ===
During 1988, a proposal was made to turn one of the gigantic one-and-a-half-mile-long (2.4 km) by one-half-mile-wide (0.80 km) mining pits into a massive, high-tech sanitary landfill. The landfill, to be operated by a partnership of two privately operated trash collection firms and the successor to Kaiser Steel, Kaiser Ventures, would ship trash by train from metropolitan Los Angeles area via the Eagle Mountain Railroad. The Riverside County Board of Supervisors approved the project in October 1992 after EPA approval of the project. Due to numerous lawsuits regarding the environmental effects of the landfill, the project was repeatedly delayed. The private partnership decided in late 1999 to give up on the project. Its share of the project was bought out by Kaiser Ventures, making it controlling owner of the project.

In August 2000, Kaiser Ventures reached an agreement with the Los Angeles Sanitation Districts, a public entity consisting of several Los Angeles public waste collection agencies, to purchase the landfill project to replace the Puente Hills landfill, which would be nearing the end of its useful life. However, since the sale agreement stated that all lawsuits and claims regarding the project must be resolved, the transaction never began. As of 2009, there was only one lawsuit still pending but in November 2009, Kaiser Ventures received a disappointing ruling from the Federal Court of Appeals for the 9th Circuit regarding this lawsuit. This ruling was a major setback for the project and ultimately Kaiser Ventures decided to abandon the project.

However, the solid waste disposal market has changed significantly since the Eagle Mountain landfill was first proposed. There has been a substantial reduction in the waste generated due to recycling efforts and an increase in low-cost traditional disposal sites (most notably in nearby Orange County), eliminating the need for remote solid waste landfills such as the Eagle Mountain landfill. The reduction in waste generated has been so great that the other landfill site owned by the Los Angeles Sanitation Districts, the Mesquite Regional landfill near Glamis, will not be needed until 2030 at the earliest even though all construction of this facility has been completed and it could immediately start accepting trash.

=== Maintenance & mothballing ===
The railroad remained relatively untouched since the last ore train operated in 1986. However, the large ore loading tower at Eagle Mountain was removed in 1990. Kaiser Ventures conducted maintenance work and routine repairs to the rail line in the mid-1990s. To accomplish this, a single switcher locomotive (painted for Kaiser Ventures) was brought to the property to operate small work trains. When this work was completed, the locomotive was stored at Eagle Mountain for a short time before being moved to the old Fontana Mill site where it remained stored.

In August and September 2003, approximately 10 mi (16 km) of track were damaged when two flash floods hit the railroad. In several locations, culverts were washed out leaving track suspended in the air although no significant structures were damaged as all bridges held up well to the flood waters. In other locations, silt up to 10 feet (3.0 m) deep covers the tracks. Kaiser Ventures estimated it would cost about $3.5 million to repair the damage. During the next two years, a contractor conducted work along the entire line to culverts and protective diversion dikes to prevent any further damage but the damaged sections remained as Kaiser Ventures decided to postpone repairs until a future date when funds would be available.

== Track removal ==
The entire interchange yard in Ferrum was removed by the Union Pacific during a track expansion project. All that remains is part of the wye and an old maintenance-of-way structure. In April 2017, a railroad materials company began removing the track by working its way from Eagle Mountain to Ferrum. By 2023 removal was completed.

== Rolling stock ==
=== Locomotives ===
The first locomotives used by Kaiser Steel on the Eagle Mountain Railroad were a pair of Baldwin Locomotive Works DRS6-6-15 diesels numbered 1010A and 1010B. They were constructed in June 1948 and delivered to the railroad in August 1948. They were Builder Numbers 73749 and 74451. They had 1,500 horsepower (1,100 kW).

As production at the mine increased, the railroad purchased two more locomotives from Baldwin. These were AS616s and were numbered 1012A and 1012B. They were constructed in early 1951 and delivered to the railroad in June 1952. They were Builder Numbers 75356 and 75357. They had 1,600 horsepower (1,200 kW).

In 1958, with production continuing to increase, the railroad purchased another Baldwin AS616 from a second-hand locomotive dealer. This locomotive was built in November 1950 and delivered to the Chesapeake and Ohio Railway (C&O) in December 1950 as their No. 5533. It has Builder Number 74917 and also had 1,600 horsepower (1,200 kW). It was sold by C&O to Pan American Engineering in Dallas, Texas in January 1958 and resold to Kaiser Steel later that year. It was assigned No. 1020 by Kaiser Steel.

In 1966 and 1967, all locomotives were renumbered by Kaiser Steel. 1010A and 1010B become 1025 and 1026 respectively while 1012A and 1012B becoming 1027 and 1028. Locomotive 1020 become 1029.

These five Baldwin locomotives were being used on a daily basis and all five were required to move a single train from the Eagle Mountain Mine to the interchange at Ferrum. By 1968, these locomotives were at the end of their useful lives and were constantly breaking down. The railroad was leasing two additional Baldwin AS616's from Southern Pacific, but still couldn't keep five locomotives running on a regular basis. This required the railroad "double" the train, which is a costly and time-consuming procedure. By 1968, the railroad decided it was time to purchase new locomotives.

In 1968, Kaiser Steel purchased five new General Electric U30C locomotives. These were numbered 1030 through 1034. The first three were constructed in March 1968 and the other two in April 1968. All five were delivered to the railroad in late April 1968. They were Builder Numbers 36762 through 36766. They have 3,000 horsepower (2,200 kW). They met Southern Pacific specifications since they were built from five production slots from an existing Southern Pacific order.

The five original locomotives were kept as spares until 1971 when they were either sold or transferred to other Kaiser operations. Locomotives 1025 and 1026 were sold in March 1972 to Railway Supply Company of Montgomery, Alabama. There they were rebuilt for Peabody Coal Company for use at its River King Mine in Marrisa, Illinois. 1025 was later sold for scrap to Hyman-Michaels in Alton, Illinois and was scrapped in August 1978. 1026 was sold in August 1978 to Koppel Bulk Terminal at Long Beach, California. It was then sold in early 1980 to Chrome Cranshaft in Alhambra, California and was scrapped in late 1980.

Locomotives 1027 and 1029 were sent to Pan American Engineering in 1971 for repairs. They were then sent to Kaiser Bauxite in Discovery Bay, Jamaica where they became 5108 and 5107 respectively. As of 2008, reports from railfans indicate they are still there, but long out-of-service.

Locomotive 1028 was sold in 1971 to Rayonier, Inc. at Grays Harbor, Washington, where it was numbered 14. It was then sold in late 1985 to Trona Railway in Trona, California, where it became No. 54, entering service in late 1986. In late 1992 it was sold to Johnston Terminal in Enid, Oklahoma. It was then sold in July 1995 to SMS Rail Service in New Jersey and given the number 554. As of 2008, it was still in service at SMS Rail Service, assigned to the Pureland Industrial Complex in Bridgeport, New Jersey.

The five GE U30C locomotives worked on the Eagle Mountain Railroad from 1968 to April 1986. Most of the time, four were assigned to the daily iron-ore trains, while the fifth locomotive would be used as a spare or be cycled through the Southern Pacific's Taylor Shops for routine maintenance and repairs. When the mine shut down in 1983, the railroad continued operating, hauling out the stockpiled iron ore. When the stockpile ran out, the locomotives were sent to the Fontana Mill for storage. The last three locomotives left the property on April 8, 1986. All five locomotives remained in storage at the Fontana Mill until 1995 when they were scrapped.

=== Cabooses ===
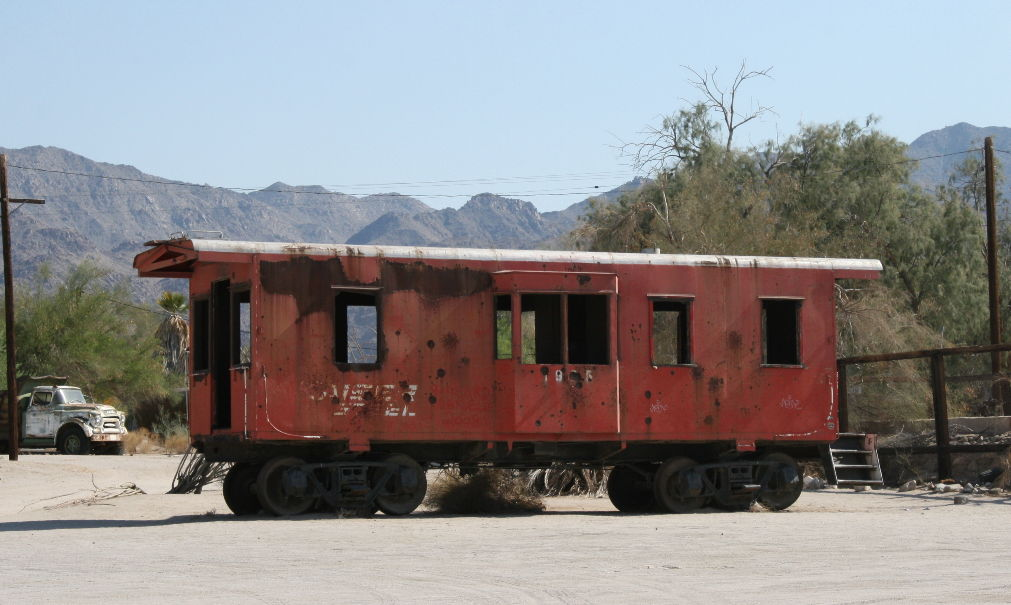
Old KS 1905 caboose at Desert Center

Kaiser Steel had two home-built cabooses it used on the Eagle Mountain Railroad. The first caboose was KS 1905 and was constructed at the Fontana Mill in 1948. The second caboose was KS 1918 and was constructed at the Fontana Mill in 1953. Both cabooses were similar to those used on the Southern Pacific Railroad at that time. Both were bay-window style with ASF Andrew-type four wheel trucks, National coiled spring bearings, and used Kaiser ship-type welded steel plate construction. They had swamp cooler air-conditioning and unusually wide bay windows. The windows in KS 1905 were slightly larger than those on KS 1918.

Both cabooses were used on a regular basis and one caboose was always at the rear of loaded ore trains from Eagle Mountain to Ferrum and just behind the locomotives on the return trips to Eagle Mountain. When the railroad reduced operations from two to one round trip ore train per day, KS 1905 become the only caboose used and KS 1918 was stored at Ferrum, where it was severely vandalized.

In June 1975, KS 1905 received severe frame damage in a switching accident at Eagle Mountain. The maintenance shop at Eagle Mountain started repairs on KS 1905 but it was quickly halted once the damage was determined to be too extensive. At this point, KS 1918 was moved to Eagle Mountain and rebuilt by the maintenance shop. Renumbered as the "new" KS 1905, its metal toolbox and wire alternator cage are from the "original" KS 1905. The rebuilding gave the "new" KS 1905 rubbered molding windows, axle belt-driven alternator, ice box, new water tank, and an air-flush commode. It was painted red with white Kaiser Steel lettering and numbers on the side. The "new" KS 1905 was used on the ore trains until 1983 when trains started operating without cabooses.

The "old" KS 1905 was stored at Eagle Mountain until 1983. Since its aborted rebuilding had left it nothing but a steel shell on railroad wheels, it was sold and was on display at Ragsdale's Desert Center Cafe in Desert Center, California, about 12 miles (19 km) south of Eagle Mountain. As of April 2009, it was still there. In November 2019, it was sold via auction for $7,500 to an unknown buyer. The "new" KS 1905 was donated by Kaiser Steel to the Pacific Southwest Railway Museum Association (PSRMA) in June 1984. On January 28, 1985, it was taken to Campo, California by truck since the railroad wasn't operating at the time. Now on display in operating condition, the "new" KS 1905 is the San Diego Railway Museum's primary work-train caboose due to its sturdiness, excellent visibility and air conditioning. It has even carried revenue passengers on occasion.

== Notes ==
- Eagle Mountain is the birthplace of Kaiser Permanente Health Care. It was at this industrial mining town that Kaiser created company owned medical clinics that would later serve as a model for what is known today as a health maintenance organization (HMO).
- The staff of Model Railroader Magazine paid homage to the Eagle Mountain Railroad by building a 4-foot by 6-foot HO scale layout in the January 2016 through January 2017 issues of Model Railroader (The January 2016 issue was the introduction of the layout while the rest was featured in the step-by-step column).

== See also ==
- List of defunct California railroads
