= Desert Center Unified School District =

Public school district in Riverside County, California

Address
- 1434 Kaiser Road Desert Center, California, 92239; United States
- Coordinates: 33°51′01″N 115°28′26″W

District information
- Type: Public
- Motto: Where Children Come First
- Grades: K–8
- Superintendent: Susan E. Scott
- NCES District ID: 0611100

Students and staff
- Students: 20 (2020–2021)
- Teachers: 2.0 (FTE)
- Staff: 7.63 (FTE)
- Student–teacher ratio: 10.0:1

Other information
- Website: dcusd.schoolblocks.com

Desert Center Unified School District is located in the eastern part of Riverside County in California. The district services the unincorporated areas of Eagle Mountain, Desert Center, Lake Tamarisk and Chiriaco Summit.

== Schools ==
=== Current schools ===
- Eagle Mountain School (on the closed Eagle Mountain High School campus at 1434 Kaiser Road, Eagle Mountain)

=== Closed schools ===
- Desert Center School
- Eagle Mountain Elementary School
- Eagle Mountain High School (currently Eagle Mountain School K–8)
- Henry J. Kaiser Middle School

== History ==
Kaiser Steel's Eagle Mountain Mine ceased operations in June, 1983. The high school held its final graduation. Three of the Desert Center Unified School District schools closed their doors. All of the district's furniture and supplies were placed into storage at Eagle Mountain High School. The high school was converted to become the kindergarten-through-eighth-grade Eagle Mountain School for the area's few remaining students. By 1985 there were only 4 regular education classes, six teachers and 75 students at the school. In 2008 it had 19 enrolled students and 2 teachers.

The first public school was established at the old site of Desert Center, which was 3 miles north of the present Desert Center in 1922. It was a one-room school. A teacher was sent out by the superintendent of schools for the four Ragsdale children. Classes were held for three years at this school from 1922 to 1925. The first term was taught by Miss Fellows and finished by Mr. Maltby. In July 1925 Desert Center was moved to the present townsite. There was no school for the 1925–1926 year. Local students drove through Box Canyon, through Mecca, to Thermal, which was a 52-mile trip. This was the original dirt road to the valley before the highway 60/70 was built. They traveled to school in a Model-T Ford.

In the school year 1926–1927 a building was erected to hold school once again at Desert Center. This building lasted three years. It is said that the goats were so hungry for knowledge that they chewed the outer edges of the building so that it was beyond further use. Six children attended taught by Miss Inwood. In 1929–1930 no school was needed. The Ragsdale children were the only children and they were in high school.

About this same time the Metropolitan Water District started construction on the aqueduct. This brought an influx of students. School once more opened in a building near the cafe. This time it was a two-teacher school. The school site was later moved about one-half mile east of Desert Center and was located there since 1935. A third temporary building was added in 1949, making a three-teacher school. In the spring of 1952 the children moved to a new red brick four-room building that is still standing as of 2022. January 1954 the new school added a fourth teacher to the staff. The enrollment climbed to 110, with students from Eagle Mountain, Eagle Mountain Water District, and Ocotillo Gardens arriving by bus, and also students from Hayfield Water District, Rock House, and Ironwood, as well as Desert Center, by private auto. The greatest distance traveled in those days was about 20 miles one-way. In those days students graduated on to high school, traveling by bus, to Coachella Valley Union High School (CVUHS).

Eagle Mountain Elementary School's first opened for the 1957–1958 school year. Prior to that elementary students were bused to the Desert Center School. Some older students continued to attend Desert Center school after the opening of Eagle Mountain Elementary School. John Hall was the first principal of Eagle Mountain Elementary. His wife Louise taught kindergarten. Eagle Mountain Elementary School closed its doors in 1983.

Eagle Mountain High School was dedicated on September 10, 1962. Prior to this high school students traveled 120 miles daily to the Coachella Valley High School, in Thermal, California. It was closed as a high school in June, 1983. The founding students chose blue and gold as the school's official colors. EMHS's original crest/emblem was designed by Dan Litteral (Class of 1966.) The school's original alma mater lyrics were written by Loretta McDonald (Class of 1964). Students from Eagle Mountain High School went on to become doctors, lawyers, airline pilots, military commissioned and non-commissioned officers, parents, teachers, professional photographers, technicians, law enforcement officers, ministers and more.

The Henry J. Kaiser Middle School was built during the late 1960s. It closed its doors in 1983.
