= Tough Guys =

1986 American action comedy film by Jeff Kanew

- Theatrical release poster
- Directed by: Jeff Kanew
- Written by: James Cruikshank; James Orr
- Produced by: Joe Wizan
- Starring: Burt Lancaster; Kirk Douglas
- Cinematography: King Baggot
- Edited by: Kaja Fehr
- Music by: James Newton Howard
- Production companies: Touchstone Pictures; Silver Screen Partners II; The Bryna Company
- Distributed by: Buena Vista Distribution Co.
- Release date: October 3, 1986
- Running time: 104 minutes
- Country: United States
- Language: English
- Budget: $10 million
- Box office: $21.5 million (US/Canada)

Tough Guys is a 1986 American action comedy film directed by Jeff Kanew and starring Burt Lancaster, Kirk Douglas, Eli Wallach, Charles Durning, Dana Carvey, and Darlanne Fluegel. It is the eighth film of Touchstone Pictures, and the final film to be released from Douglas's Bryna Productions.

Lancaster and Douglas had already made several films together, including I Walk Alone (1948), Gunfight at the O.K. Corral (1957), The Devil's Disciple (1959), The List of Adrian Messenger (1963), and Seven Days in May (1964), becoming something of a team in the public's eye. Douglas was always second-billed under Lancaster, but, with the exception of I Walk Alone, in which Douglas played a villain, and The List of Adrian Messenger, in which Lancaster cameoed, their roles were more or less of equal importance. Tough Guys was their final collaboration.

Adolph Caesar, who was originally going to star as Leon B. Little, died of complications from a heart attack on the set of the film and was replaced by Eli Wallach.

This was the first film released under the Touchstone Pictures label after Walt Disney Studios changed the name of the label from Touchstone Films, following the release of Ruthless People (1986). It received mixed reviews from critics.

== Plot ==
Gangsters Harry Doyle and Archie Long are released from prison after having served a 30-year sentence for hijacking the Southern Pacific train, the Gold Coast Flyer, in 1956. Their parole officer Richie Evans meets them at the gates, offering them a ride to collect their Social Security. Meanwhile Leon B. Little, an elderly hitman with bad eyesight and an contract on them, tries to kill Harry and Archie, who get away.

At the bank, the duo stops a robbery by apprehending two young gunmen. They then confront six street punks who attempt to rob them. Richie updates them on their parole conditions. Harry, who is 72, is assigned to a retirement community. Despite wishing to continue working, he has surpassed the mandatory retirement age of 70. 67-year-old Archie takes a job first at an ice cream parlor and later at a restaurant. They cannot have further contact with each other for at least three years, and are monitored by Richie and Deke Yablonski, the officer who first arrested them.

Archie's young female restaurant manager mistreats him, while Harry is denied proper food by a nasty retirement home orderly, and the female manager is even nastier. Harry reconnects with his old flame Belle, and they reminisce about old times.

Archie embraces the greatly changed contemporary scene, and at a unisex high-tech gym, the young manager Skye considers himself the only "real man" there. She gets Archie to adopt faddish clothes and invites him to a trendy disco nightclub, they gyrate to new wave music and start an affair, which ageing Archie cannot sustain.

Tired of trying to adjust to 1980s society under the eyes of the law, Harry and Archie return to their old ways. First, trying to reassemble their old gang for a bank robbery, all surviving members are now either crippled or invalids. When they hijack an armoured truck, they find it empty except for a roll of quarters, and are mocked by the media. To add insult to injury, they are mistaken for younger, disguised men.

Meanwhile, Leon tracks Richie down at his office and finds Harry's retirement home. He holds him and Belle hostage until Harry and Archie arrive and open fire. Richie knocks Leon down, escapes with them, and blames himself for getting them into trouble.

Archie decides to hijack the Gold Coast Flyer again as it makes its final southbound run after 50 years, asking Harry and Richie for help. Both refuse for moral reasons, so Archie decides to do it alone. He stops the Flyer just as it is leaving the railroad yard and is soon joined by Harry, having had a change of heart.

The media and dignitaries aboard are surprised, although Harry and Archie gladly answer their questions and pose for pictures as they identify themselves and their ages. To their surprise, Leon arrives and explains that he had been paid $25,000 to kill them by their old enemy, and he has waited 30 years for their release.

Deke then arrives with a SWAT team to capture Harry and Archie, who persuade Leon to call a temporary truce as they have never killed anyone in their crimes. As Leon escorts the passengers off the train, Richie, disguised as a SWAT officer, sneaks aboard and gets it moving again to help Harry and Archie escape before Deke can arrest them.

Harry, Archie, Richie, and Leon take the train toward Mexico, but find that the tracks end just before the border. Harry pushes Leon off the train engine, to which he vows revenge. Archie then takes Richie back to the coaches and uncouples the train from the engine, advising to downplay his role in the heist to not destroy his career. Harry and Archie drive the engine at full throttle through a fusillade of bullets from U.S. border police. They crash their way through, burying the engine partially in the soil of Mexico a few feet across the border, where a Mexican border patrol arrests them for hijacking the train and uncoupling the engine from the coaches.

Harry and Archie comply by raising their hands while arguing with the commanding officer, creating a distraction that allows Archie to kick him.

== Cast ==
- Burt Lancaster as Harold 'Harry' Doyle
- Kirk Douglas as Archibald 'Archie' Long
- Charles Durning as Sergeant Deke Yablonski
- Alexis Smith as Belle
- Dana Carvey as Richard 'Richie' Evans
- Darlanne Fluegel as Skye Foster
- Eli Wallach as Leon B. Little
- Monty Ash as Vince
- Billy Barty as Philly
- Simmy Bow as Dick Schultz
- Darlene Conley as Gladys Ripps
- Nathan Davis as Jimmy Ellis
- Grant Aleksander as Bartender At Mickey's Bar
- Red Hot Chili Peppers as Themselves
- Hilary Shepard as Sandy
- Steven Memel as Derek
- Matthew Faison as Man In Gay Bar
- Donald Thompson as Boy Scout
- Scott Nemes as Obnoxious Kid in Yogurt Shop
- Graham Jarvis as Richie's Boss at Parole Office
- Eleanor Zee as Archie's Boss in Restaurant

== Soundtrack ==
Kenny Rogers sings the opening theme song "They Don't Make Them Like They Used To".

Janet Jackson sings the song "Nasty," during Harry and Archie's lesson in Street Fighting with a local street gang.

The Red Hot Chilli Peppers briefly appear in the film where they performed a song never heard outside this film: "Set It Straight". No soundtrack album was released, and frontman Anthony Kiedis was quoted as saying they recorded it solely for the movie and had no intention of releasing it themselves.

The 1977 Bing Crosby recording of Duke Ellington's "Don't Get Around Much Anymore" is featured.

The Fabulous Thunderbirds song "Tuff Enuff" plays in the armoured truck hijacking scene on the truck's radio and during the ending credits.

== Production ==
Adolph Caesar was originally cast as Leon B. Little, but the actor died unexpectedly only a few weeks into filming. His completed scenes were re-shot with his replacement, Eli Wallach.

Daylight the Southern Pacific No. 4449 4-8-4 Tender Engine plays the Gold Coast Flyer. It was also used to pull the American Freedom Train during the United States Bicentennial, now based in Portland, Oregon. The locomotive engineer was played by Doyle L. McCormack, the man most responsible for the restoration of engine No. 4449. During the filming of the exterior shots of the engine No. 4449, the train was stored nightly at the Eagle Mountain rail yards. The local school children from Eagle Mountain School took a field trip in early 1986 to see and toured the train on location along the Eagle Mountain Railroad south of Interstate 10. A portion of the Eagle Mountain Railroad was used in the filming of the movie.

On November 2, 2019, the full-size replica prop, which was used at the end of the film, was sold at auction to a student at Desert Center, California.

== Reception ==
=== Box office ===
The film was released in theaters on October 3, 1986, in the United States, making US$4.5 million on its first weekend and would eventually gross $21,458,229 in the United States and Canada.

=== Critical response ===
Tough Guys received mixed reviews from critics. On Rotten Tomatoes, it has an approval rating of 47% based on 17 reviews. On Metacritic, the film has a weighted average score of 54 out of 100, based on eleven critics, indicating "Mixed or average reviews".

Walter Goodman of The New York Times gave the film a positive review, saying, “We know that when the he-men of “Gunfight at the O.K. Corral” are picked on by a bunch of callow toughs, the toughs are going to regret they started up. But it's fun anyhow waiting for what it is.” Roger Ebert gave the film a two out of four stars, stating, "'Tough Guys' might have been better if Douglas and Lancaster had played characters who were a little more fallible, humble and realistic".

== See also ==
- Going in Style
- Stand Up Guys
- Going in Style (2017 film)
