= Alpart =

Coordinates: 17.967°N 77.608°W

Alumina Partners of Jamaica, also known as Alpart, is a company that owns and operates a bauxite refinery in Nain, Jamaica. Alpart was founded in 1969 as a joint venture by Kaiser Aluminum, Reynolds Aluminum, and Anaconda. Construction commenced in December 1966. the first buildings completed were for a Dunwoody industrial skills training center, which began teaching in November 1967. Plant operations began on 18 May 1969, (the first shipment was made 9 August 1969) and on 6 March 1970 the formal opening ceremony took place, attended by prime minister Hugh Shearer and then union leader and later prime minister Michael Manley.

Around the beginning of the 1980s the Caribbean bauxite industry was in decline. High demand during the boom years of the 1950s and 1960s had caused an increase in exploration activity which resulted in major finds in Australia, Guinea and Brazil. In the 1970s business condition worsened as a result of shifts in government policy in Jamaica and Guyana. The global increase in oil prices were a further blow to the already relatively inefficient Caribbean alumina operations. The Aluminum sector at the time accounted for 40-50% of the entire energy consumption of the country, 90% of which was satisfied through imported oil and petroleum products.

World Bauxite Production (x 1,000 tonnes)
| | 1970 | 1975 | 1980 | 1981 | 1982 | 1983 | 1984 |
|---|---|---|---|---|---|---|---|
| World | 48,715 | 63,671 | 78,192 | 73,476 | 63,092 | 63,615 | 80,849 |
| Caribbean | 24,191 | 21,456 | 20,991 | 18,957 | 13,347 | 11,747 | 14,595 |
| Jamaica | 12,010 | 11,570 | 12,064 | 11,606 | 8,158 | 7,682 | 8,735 |

In August 1985 Reynolds and Kaiser bought out Atlantic Richfield's 27% stake (Anaconda's stake) and 11 days later (13 August 1985) announced the temporary closure of the plant, which had been operating at one-half capacity since 1982. In December 1988 an agreement to reopen the plant was reached. On 19 March 1989 the plant reopened, controlled by a 65-35 joint venture of Kaiser Aluminum and Norsk Hydro.

While in bankruptcy in 2004, Kaiser Aluminum auctioned off its 65% stake to Rusal who bid $295 million for it. Norsk Hydro subsequently exercised its first right of refusal and acquired the interest for itself and then immediately passed it on to Glencore at cost. Glencore was already 93% owner of the nearby Windalco operation. A few years later the aluminum division of Glencore became part of Rusal.

Alpart exports 1.65 million tonnes of alumina overseas per year, and earned gross revenues of US$1.3 billion in 2007.

On 15 May 2009 the plant shut down again (Great Recession).

In 2011 Hydro divested its 35% stake to Rusal, who paid $46 million and then owned 100%, while the refinery remained shut down due to unfavorable market conditions.

In July 2016, UC Rusal sold its 100% stake to the Chinese state industrial group, Jiuquan Iron & Steel (Group) Co. Ltd. (‘JISCO’) for $299 million. Close to $150 million was spent to rehabilitate the plant, which was put in operation in June 2017, and shut down again on 27 September 2019. The first shipment under new management departed from Port Kaiser on 29 December 2017: 35,000 tonnes to China.

According to Minister of Agriculture, Fisheries and Mining Floyd Green, JISCO is currently planning to begin work on a $490 million modernization program at the end of 2026 and to restart operations in June 2027.

Alpart was in operation 195 months, shut down 43 months, in operation 242 months, shut down 97 months, in operation 27 months, and in June 2027 will have been shut down 97 months. 464 in operations total (66%) vs. 237 months shut down total since inception.
