= Desert Center Airport =

Airport in California, United States

Desert Center Airport Desert Center Army Air Field
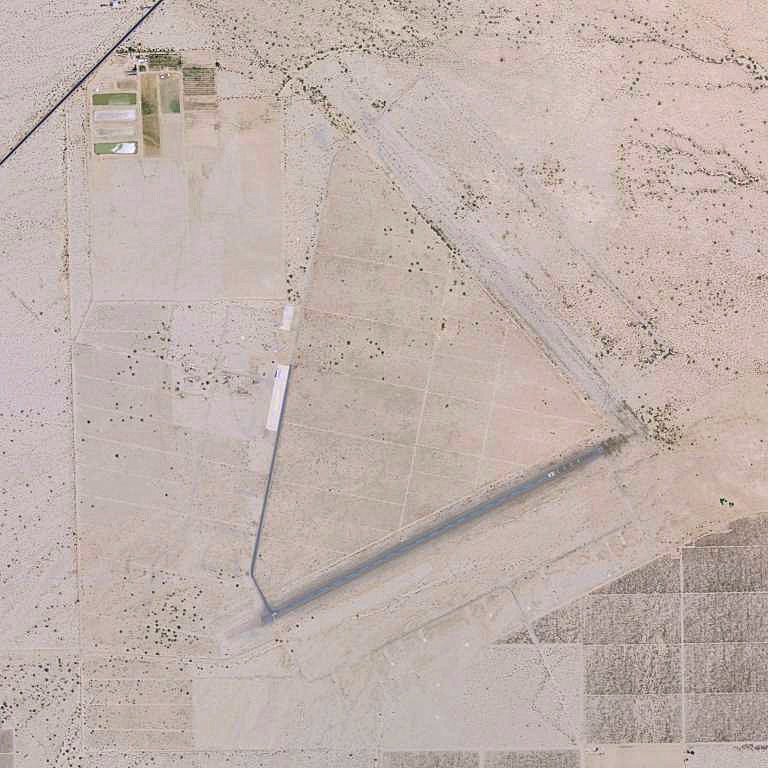
- 2006 orthophoto from USGS
- IATA: none; ICAO: none; FAA LID: CN64

Summary
- Airport type: Private
- Owner: Chuckwalla Valley Associates LLC
- Serves: Desert Center, California
- Elevation AMSL: 559 ft (170 m)
- Coordinates: 33°44′52″N 115°19′31″W

Map
- Location of airport in California CN64 (the United States)

Runways
Direction	Length		Surface
Direction	ft	m	Surface
5/23	4,200	1,280	Asphalt

Statistics (2006)
- Aircraft operations: 150
- Source: Federal Aviation Administration

Desert Center Airport (FAA LID: CN64, formerly L64) is a private-use airport located five nautical miles (6 mi, 9 km) northeast of the central business district of Desert Center, in Riverside County, California, United States.

The airport is located at the end of an unnamed road, one mile (1.6 km) east of CA Route 177 (Desert Center - Rice Road), 127 miles (204 km) northeast of San Diego.

== History ==
=== World War II use ===
Desert Center Army Air Field (AAF) was built in the early 1940s was a subbase of Thermal Army Air Field and served as a support base for the Air Technical Service Command near Camp Desert Center. The airfield was located within the Desert Center Division Camp, which encompassed over 34,000 acres (140 km^{2}). Desert Center was one of the areas included in the California Arizona Maneuver Area, used during 1942–44 to train General Patton's armored forces for desert combat prior to it deploying to North Africa.

Desert Center AAF was first known as the Desert Center Airdrome. According to a history of the 1st, 2nd, and 3rd Airdrome Detachments, a detachment of the 475th Base Headquarters and Air Base Squadron was the first administrative unit stationed at Desert Center, arriving on 15 January 1943. It was described as having 5,500' runways. The field also had taxiways and a parking apron. More than 40 buildings were constructed at the airfield, including an operations building, power house, Link Trainer building, hangar and various supply buildings. The 74th Reconnaissance Group was the first flying unit at the field, arriving in December 1942 while the facility was under construction. It was variously equipped with O-52s, L-1s, L-4s, B-25s, P-39s and P-40s and trained to provide air support and reconnaissance to the Army ground forces training at the desert combat training facility.

Desert Center AAF was officially opened in April 1943. The 3d Airdrome Detachment was activated on 1 August to maintain the installation and assist in the administration and training of tactical organizations stationed at the airfield for training and maneuvers.

When the training area closed in 1944, the airfield was assigned to the Fourth Air Force, and operational activities decreased greatly. The airfield remained open, however, and was used by B-24 Liberator crews flying training missions from March Field.

=== Civil use ===
In 1946, following the end of World War II, the airfield was turned over to the Army Corps of Engineers, and the buildings were auctioned off to the public.

It was listed as "Desert Center CAA Site 17" in the "Aerodromes" table on the 1955 San Diego Sectional Aeronautical Chart. It described the field as having two 5,000' bituminous runways. The airfield was listed among active airports in the 1962 AOPA Airport Directory, under the name of "FAA Site 17". It was described as having two 5,000 ft bituminous runways: 13/31 & 4/22, and the operator was listed as the FAA. It was closed in the mid-1960s, but listed as an emergency airfield.

The airport was reopened as a civil airport (owned by Riverside County) at some point between 1966 and 2002. However, as of 2002 it was all but abandoned. There were no aircraft based at the field, and the Airport Facility Directory data listed a mere 150 takeoffs and landings per year. The sole remaining maintained runway is 5/23, which consists of a 4,200 ft asphalt strip which was overlaid over remains of the original military runway. Two buildings were still standing.

=== Recent history ===
Today, there are remains of Patton's army all around the airport including foundations from the old buildings and pieces of discarded equipment mixed in with the remains of old agriculture and vandalism. The abandoned Runway 13/31 is barely discernible, covered with sand and bushes. There are no historic buildings left, although there are numerous foundations and a concrete parking ramp.

In 2003, the airfield was being used to fly unmanned aircraft. The hangar had been converted to a workshop and an inclined launching ramp was constructed.

In 2004, the airfield was again put up for sale by Riverside County and bought by Chuckwalla Valley Associates, LLC, to service the new Chuckwalla Valley Raceway.

== Facilities and aircraft ==
Desert Center Airport covers an area of 1,129 acres (457 ha) at an elevation of 559 feet (170 m) above mean sea level. It has one runway designated 5/23 with an asphalt surface measuring 4,200 by 50 feet (1,280 x 15 m). For the 12-month period ending December 31, 2006, the airport had 150 general aviation aircraft operations.

== See also ==
- California World War II Army Airfields
- Desert Training Center
