= Desert Center, California =

Desert Center
- Census-designated place
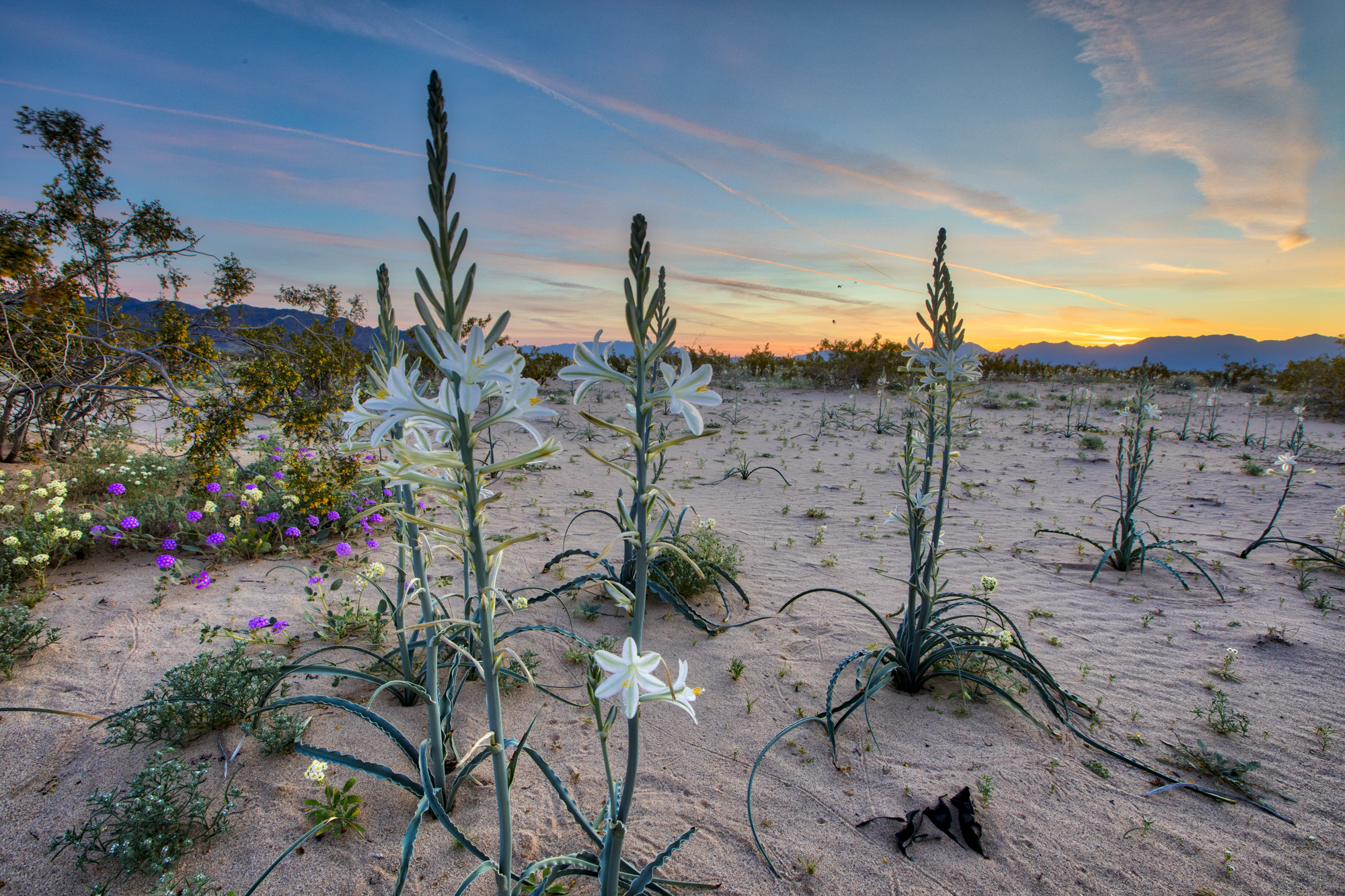
- Desert Center's Desert Lily Preserve

- Location of Desert Center in Riverside County, California

- Location within the state of California
- Coordinates: 33°42′48″N 115°24′02″W
- Country: United States
- State: California
- County: Riverside

Area
  - Total: 30.42 sq mi (78.80 km^{2})
  - Land: 30.42 sq mi (78.80 km^{2})
  - Water: 0 sq mi (0.00 km^{2}) 0%
- Elevation: 656 ft (200 m)

Population (2020)
  - Total: 256
  - Density: 8.4/sq mi (3.25/km^{2})
- Time zone: UTC−8 (Pacific (PST))
  - Summer (DST): UTC−7 (PDT)
- ZIP Code: 92239
- Area codes: 442 and 760
- FIPS code: 06-18982
- GNIS feature ID: 2582993

Desert Center is a census-designated place in the Colorado Desert in Riverside County, California. It is in southern California, between the cities of Indio and Blythe at the junction of Interstate 10 and State Route 177, about halfway between Phoenix and Los Angeles. The ZIP Code is 92239, and the community is in telephone area codes 442 and 760. The elevation is 656 feet (200 m). The population was 256 at the 2020 census.

== History ==
=== Beginnings: "Desert Steve" Ragsdale ===
The town was founded in 1921 by Stephen Albert Ragsdale, also known as "Desert Steve", and his wife, Lydia. Ragsdale was an itinerant preacher and cotton farmer, originally from Arkansas. In 1915, he left his farm in the Palo Verde Valley along the Colorado River to attend to some business in Los Angeles. The road between Phoenix and Los Angeles was mostly sand, and Ragsdale's vehicle broke down near a place called Gruendyke's Well. This featured a hand-dug well and was inhabited by a prospector named Bill Gruendyke. Gruendyke rescued Ragsdale and gave him food, shelter, and water until his vehicle was repaired and he could resume his journey to Los Angeles.

Upon his return, Ragsdale bought out Gruendyke and moved his family to the remote spot, where they constructed a small shack with a lean-to that served as a repair garage. A Model T truck was modified to serve as a tow car. Gasoline was pumped by hand from a 55-gallon drum. Lydia served food and refreshments to thirsty and weary travelers. In spite of the remote location—50 miles (80 km) in any direction from anything—the Ragsdales prospered. Ragsdale named his outpost "Desert Center". In 1921, it was announced that the sand road running through Desert Center would be relocated about 5 miles (8.0 km) north, straightened, paved, and named U.S. Route 60, a modern "high-speed" highway. In March 1926, The San Bernardino Daily Sun reported that 21 miles of grading was being done on a new road from Desert Center to Hopkins Well, changing the location of the desert highway and running over better soil.

"'The old highway there will be abandoned when the new work is completed,' said Mr. [E. Q.] Sullivan [division engineer for the California Highway Commission], 'and we will later surface such stretches of the new road as are necessary.' F. C. Payton is the contractor handling the grading work."

Ragsdale abandoned "old Desert Center" and built a poured-concrete café in the adobe style with an attached gasoline station and a huge service garage. Across the road, a series of wooden structures were built, including a market (which at one time was the largest Coleman camping equipment dealer in the country), and a post office. He also built several cabins for travelers, and a large "plunge" (swimming pool) next to the café where travelers could escape the desert heat.

Ragsdale was a desert eccentric of the first order, and his advertising for Desert Center in publications such as Desert Magazine reflected his personality: "U Need Us – We Need U", "Our Main Street is 100-miles long!", "We lost our keys...we can't close!" (a reference to the fact that the café has been open 24 hours a day, 365 days a year since it opened in 1921), "Free Room and Board Every Day The Sun Doesn't Shine In Desert Center", "If You Don't Believe Me, You Can Go To Hell, or Visit Me in Desert Center in August! Nuf sed, Steve".

When Ragsdale needed a teacher for his own children and the few others in the town, the county declined to send one; there weren't enough students to warrant the expense. Ragsdale hastily built a basic structure of stick framing with paper board walls to use as a schoolhouse, and placed an ad in Los Angeles newspapers asking for an auto mechanic with a large family, which he got, and a teacher was indeed provided by the county.

Ragsdale frequently retreated to his writing shack near the north tip of the rock formation called "The Alligator" (across I-10 from Desert Center) where he composed poetry—the stanzas are referred to as "Spasm #1", etc.—to be distributed in booklet form to travelers. Ragsdale was a close friend of many classic "desert people" such as Randall Henderson, founder of Desert Magazine; Marshall South, the hermit of Ghost Mountain; desert painter John Hilton; noted biologist Edmund C. Jaeger; and Harry Oliver, with whom Steve co-founded the annual Pegleg Smith Liar's Contest in Anza-Borrego. Oliver often printed items about Desert Steve in his 'newspaper,' the Desert Rat Scrap Book.

Within a few years, Ragsdale operated a number of satellite businesses in locations such as Cactus City, Hell, Skyway, Box Canyon, and Shaver's Well. Around 1950, he left Desert Center, living the rest of his days at his log cabin retreat near the summit of Santa Rosa Mountain. His sons, Stanley, Thurman, and Herbert, took over operations of Desert Center, and Stanley eventually purchased the town from his father. Stanley ran it for decades, adding a hamburger stand and the Stanco gasoline station.

=== Early prepaid health insurance ===
In the early 1930s, Dr. Sidney R. Garfield, who had just graduated from University of Southern California, went to visit a former classmate with a practice in Indio. The practice was thriving to capacity, while Garfield was nearly without business in Depression-era Los Angeles. Garfield's friend explained that he was the closest doctor (50 miles) to 5,000 men digging the Colorado River Aqueduct under direction of Six Companies, Inc. The project site's headquarters was just southeast of Desert Center. Garfield borrowed money from his father and constructed a 4-bed clinic near the construction site. The clinic was cooled by an ammonia air-conditioning system and at the time was the only air-conditioned building between Riverside and Phoenix. Garfield would treat the men, who would promise to pay on payday, but who would usually go to Blythe or Indio and drink their paychecks. Within a year, Garfield was broke and announced that he would pull up stakes.

Hearing this, Henry J. Kaiser, whose division of the Six Companies, Inc. was building the stretch of the Colorado River Aqueduct through the Desert Center vicinity, visited Garfield at his clinic. His idea was to take a nickel a day out of each man's paycheck to prepay for that man's future medical treatments, should an injury occur while he was working. If the man wanted to be covered for the remainder of the day, after work hours, another nickel would be deducted. If the man had a wife and/or children he wanted to cover, this would cost another nickel. Within a short time, Garfield had a steady income stream and things improved for him immensely. When the aqueduct project was finished, Kaiser's next venture was the construction of the Grand Coulee Dam, and he took Garfield with him to manage the workers' health care, but this time there were 50,000 men, not just 5,000.

Garfield's Contractors General Hospital evolved into Kaiser Permanente, the largest managed health care system in the world, but its origins are in Desert Center. In 1992 a roadside historical marker at the site was unveiled by Garfield's sister next to the grocery honoring Desert Center as the birthplace of Kaiser Permanente.

=== General Patton – Desert Training Center ===
By 1942, Desert Center had very few residents. It was then that the Army, under the direction of Maj. General George S. Patton, established the Desert Center Army Air Field and the Camp Desert Center to support operations in the California-Arizona Maneuver Area. The base covered 18,000 square miles (47,000 km^{2}). Its purpose was to train troops for combat in the deserts of North Africa against the forces of German Field Marshal Erwin Rommel. The enormous operation came to a close in 1944, when the Allies were victorious in the North African theatre. A museum honoring Patton and his training complex is located in Chiriaco Summit.

After the military's departure, the town became quiet again, remaining relatively unchanged as the old U.S. Route 60/70 was replaced by Interstate 10.

=== Eagle Mountain Mine and Prison ===
The site of Kaiser Steel Eagle Mountain Mine, which was one of the largest open-pit iron mining operations in the world at the time of opening, is located about 13 miles (21 km) north of Desert Center. The rich iron ore deposit was discovered by geologists employed by Henry J. Kaiser during construction of the Colorado River Aqueduct in the early 1930s. The Eagle Mountain Mine operated at capacity from World War II until Kaiser closed the mine and the town of Eagle Mountain in early 1982.

Movies & TV shows have used the mine as a filming location, including scenes from the Terminator 2: Judgment Day—first Terminator movie in 3-D.

A for-profit prison was operated by Utah's Management and Training Corporation here in facilities leased from Kaiser Steel. Nine weeks before it was closed on December 31, 2003, a race riot claimed the lives of two black prisoners.

Plans for a project to operate an enormous waste management landfill at the mine site were stopped by environmentalists' legal actions taken to protect the surrounding Colorado Desert ecosystem and the groundwater aquifer.

== Desert Center today ==
Today, the town barely survives. The United States Post Office is the only remaining business. The nearest gasoline and fast food are at Chiriaco Summit, over 19 miles away. Desert Center is home to agricultural farms, two mobile home parks frequented by "snowbirds", and the Lake Tamarisk community, which includes a golf course that was founded by the Kaiser Steel Corporation for mine management.

Desert Center Airport (FAA LID: L64) has a 4,200-foot (1,300 m) runway, but last operated as a public airport in 1992. It is now privately owned and since 2010 has been the site of the Chuckwalla Valley Raceway, a professional-grade motorsports track that can be rented by clubs and individuals.

The 1980s saw a surge of growth in Desert Center as jojoba gained popularity. The brackish water, sandy soil, and dry weather make the area ideal for cultivation of this hardy desert plant whose oil is used chiefly in cosmetic products.

In the early 1990s, Stanley Ragsdale commissioned the planting of several hundred palm trees in strange patterns on the town's frontage with Interstate 10. When asked why, he said he always wanted a "tree-ring circus". Since his death in 1999, the trees have been left unattended and many have died.

As of May 2021 a large portion of the town has been purchased by a Riverside resident and is in escrow.

The area around Desert Center has become a hotbed of solar energy generation with the Desert Sunlight Solar Farm nearby.

=== Services ===
The community is served by State Route 177 and Interstate 10. Most wireline phone numbers in Desert Center and Lake Tamarisk are served by Verizon Communications from the (760) 227-xxxx exchange. Additionally, Desert Center is served by Competitive Local Exchange Carriers (CLECs) via the (760) 205 and (760) 437 exchanges (per the Telecordia Local Exchange Routing Guide). As of 2000, a Caltrans maintenance station existed at 29476 Ragsdale Road.

Local schoolchildren are part of the Desert Center Unified School District. Elementary and middle school students attend Eagle Mountain School in Eagle Mountain, California, while high school students are bussed daily to Blythe, California.

Palo Verde Valley Transit Agency operates lifeline transportation services to Indio and Blythe for local residents.

=== Lake Tamarisk ===
Lake Tamarisk is a community about one and three quarter miles north of Interstate 10 off Kaiser Road at 33°44′20″N 115°23′20″W, and on the Desert Center 7.5-minute quadrangle. The community has a golf course with low greens fees.

Both the Lake Tamarisk Library and Riverside County Fire Department Station 49 are located in Lake Tamarisk.

== Geography ==
According to the United States Census Bureau, the CDP covers an area of 30.4 square miles (79 km^{2}), all of it land.

In the vicinity of Desert Center are the Chuckwalla Mountains, Corn Springs, Eagle Mountain (Kaiser Steel's former iron mine), and Chiriaco Summit and museum.

== Climate ==
According to the Köppen Climate Classification system, Desert Center has a hot desert climate, abbreviated "BWh" on climate maps. The hottest temperature recorded in Desert Center was 121 °F (49.4 °C) on July 9, 2024, while the coldest temperature recorded was 14 °F (−10.0 °C) on January 7, 1950.

Climate data for Hayfield Pumping Plant, California, 1991–2020 normals, extremes 1933–present
Month	Jan	Feb	Mar	Apr	May	Jun	Jul	Aug	Sep	Oct	Nov	Dec	Year
Record high °F (°C)	86 (30)	96 (36)	107 (42)	105 (41)	114 (46)	120 (49)	121 (49)	118 (48)	120 (49)	112 (44)	94 (34)	87 (31)	121 (49)
Mean maximum °F (°C)	77.5 (25.3)	81.4 (27.4)	89.5 (31.9)	98.3 (36.8)	103.3 (39.6)	111.0 (43.9)	114.1 (45.6)	113.2 (45.1)	108.9 (42.7)	100.2 (37.9)	87.9 (31.1)	77.6 (25.3)	115.7 (46.5)
Mean daily maximum °F (°C)	67.1 (19.5)	70.3 (21.3)	76.7 (24.8)	83.3 (28.5)	91.5 (33.1)	100.9 (38.3)	105.5 (40.8)	105.1 (40.6)	99.7 (37.6)	88.4 (31.3)	75.9 (24.4)	66.3 (19.1)	85.9 (29.9)
Daily mean °F (°C)	53.3 (11.8)	55.8 (13.2)	61.5 (16.4)	67.3 (19.6)	75.6 (24.2)	84.1 (28.9)	90.5 (32.5)	90.4 (32.4)	83.7 (28.7)	71.9 (22.2)	60.3 (15.7)	52.4 (11.3)	70.6 (21.4)
Mean daily minimum °F (°C)	39.4 (4.1)	41.4 (5.2)	46.3 (7.9)	51.3 (10.7)	59.7 (15.4)	67.3 (19.6)	75.5 (24.2)	75.7 (24.3)	67.6 (19.8)	55.5 (13.1)	44.7 (7.1)	38.6 (3.7)	55.3 (12.9)
Mean minimum °F (°C)	27.8 (−2.3)	30.3 (−0.9)	34.7 (1.5)	40.4 (4.7)	48.4 (9.1)	56.4 (13.6)	65.4 (18.6)	64.3 (17.9)	56.3 (13.5)	42.3 (5.7)	32.3 (0.2)	27.5 (−2.5)	24.5 (−4.2)
Record low °F (°C)	14 (−10)	21 (−6)	18 (−8)	30 (−1)	39 (4)	44 (7)	56 (13)	53 (12)	46 (8)	29 (−2)	22 (−6)	15 (−9)	14 (−10)
Average precipitation inches (mm)	0.99 (25)	0.75 (19)	0.46 (12)	0.14 (3.6)	0.10 (2.5)	0.00 (0.00)	0.21 (5.3)	0.37 (9.4)	0.50 (13)	0.25 (6.4)	0.18 (4.6)	0.66 (17)	4.61 (117.8)
Average precipitation days (≥ 0.01 in)	3.4	3.0	2.2	1.2	0.5	0.0	1.0	1.5	1.2	1.0	0.8	2.6	18.4
Source 1: NOAA
Source 2: National Weather Service

== Demographics ==
Historical population
Census	Pop.	Note	%±
2010	204		—
2020	256		25.5%
U.S. Decennial Census; 1860–1870 1880-1890; 1900 1910 1920; 1930 1940 1950; 1960 1970 1980; 1990 2000 2010

Desert Center first appeared as a census designated place in the 2010 U.S. census.

=== Racial and ethnic composition ===
Desert Center CDP, California – Racial and ethnic composition Note: the US Census treats Hispanic/Latino as an ethnic category. This table excludes Latinos from the racial categories and assigns them to a separate category. Hispanics/Latinos may be of any race.
Race / Ethnicity (NH = Non-Hispanic)	Pop 2010	Pop 2020	% 2010	% 2020
White alone (NH)	156	167	76.47%	65.23%
Black or African American alone (NH)	1	4	0.49%	1.56%
Native American or Alaska Native alone (NH)	0	0	0.00%	0.00%
Asian alone (NH)	2	2	0.98%	0.78%
Native Hawaiian or Pacific Islander alone (NH)	0	0	0.00%	0.00%
Other race alone (NH)	0	0	0.00%	0.00%
Mixed race or Multiracial (NH)	7	12	3.43%	4.69%
Hispanic or Latino (any race)	38	71	18.63%	27.73%
Total	204	256	100.00%	100.00%

=== 2020 ===
The 2020 United States census reported that Desert Center had a population of 256. The population density was 8.4 inhabitants per square mile (3.2/km^{2}). The racial makeup of Desert Center was 173 (67.6%) White, 5 (2.0%) African American, 0 (0.0%) Native American, 2 (0.8%) Asian, 0 (0.0%) Pacific Islander, 49 (19.1%) from other races, and 27 (10.5%) from two or more races. Hispanic or Latino of any race were 71 persons (27.7%).

The whole population lived in households. There were 96 households, out of which 14 (14.6%) had children under the age of 18 living in them, 46 (47.9%) were married-couple households, 7 (7.3%) were cohabiting couple households, 26 (27.1%) had a female householder with no partner present, and 17 (17.7%) had a male householder with no partner present. 28 households (29.2%) were one person, and 18 (18.8%) were one person aged 65 or older. The average household size was 2.67. There were 60 families (62.5% of all households).

The age distribution was 46 people (18.0%) under the age of 18, 10 people (3.9%) aged 18 to 24, 50 people (19.5%) aged 25 to 44, 66 people (25.8%) aged 45 to 64, and 84 people (32.8%) who were 65 years of age or older. The median age was 52.0 years. For every 100 females, there were 86.9 males.

There were 175 housing units at an average density of 5.8 units per square mile (2.2 units/km^{2}), of which 96 (54.9%) were occupied. Of these, 68 (70.8%) were owner-occupied, and 28 (29.2%) were occupied by renters.

=== 2010 ===
The 2010 United States census reported that Desert Center had a population of 204. The population density was 6.7 people per square mile (2.6/km^{2}). The racial makeup of Desert Center was 164 (80.4%) White (76.5% Non-Hispanic White), 1 (0.5%) African American, 3 (1.5%) Native American, 2 (1.0%) Asian, 0 (0%) Pacific Islander, 25 (12%) from other races, and 9 (4%) from two or more races. Hispanic or Latino of any race were 38 persons (18.6%).

The census reported that 203 people (99% of the population) lived in households, 1 (<1%) lived in non-institutionalized group quarters, and 0 (0%) were institutionalized.

There were 85 households, out of which 20 (24%) had children under the age of 18 living in them, 37 (44%) were opposite-sex married couples living together, 10 (12%) had a female householder with no husband present, 1 (1%) had a male householder with no wife present. There were 3 (4%) unmarried opposite-sex partnerships, and 0 (0%) same-sex married couples or partnerships. 33 households (39%) were made up of individuals, and 15 (18%) had someone living alone who was 65 years of age or older. The average household size was 2.39. There were 48 families (57% of all households); the average family size was 3.19.

The population was spread out, with 40 people (20%) under the age of 18, 12 people (6%) aged 18 to 24, 43 people (21%) aged 25 to 44, 64 people (31%) aged 45 to 64, and 45 people (22%) who were 65 years of age or older. The median age was 47.5 years. For every 100 females, there were 106.1 males. For every 100 females age 18 and over, there were 102.5 males.

There were 140 housing units at an average density of 4.6 per square mile (1.8/km^{2}), of which 61 (72%) were owner-occupied, and 24 (28%) were occupied by renters. The homeowner vacancy rate was 9%; the rental vacancy rate was 33%. 147 people (72% of the population) lived in owner-occupied housing units and 56 people (28%) lived in rental housing units.

According to the 2010 United States census, Desert Center had a median household income of $27,031, with 28.8% of the population living below the federal poverty line.

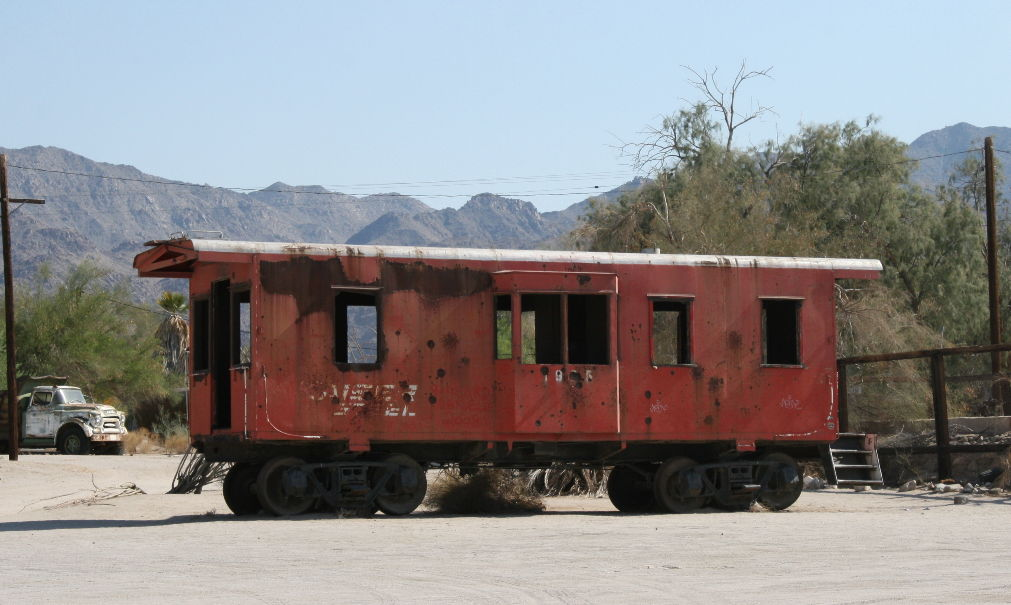
Old Kaiser Steel (KS) 1905 caboose at Desert Center

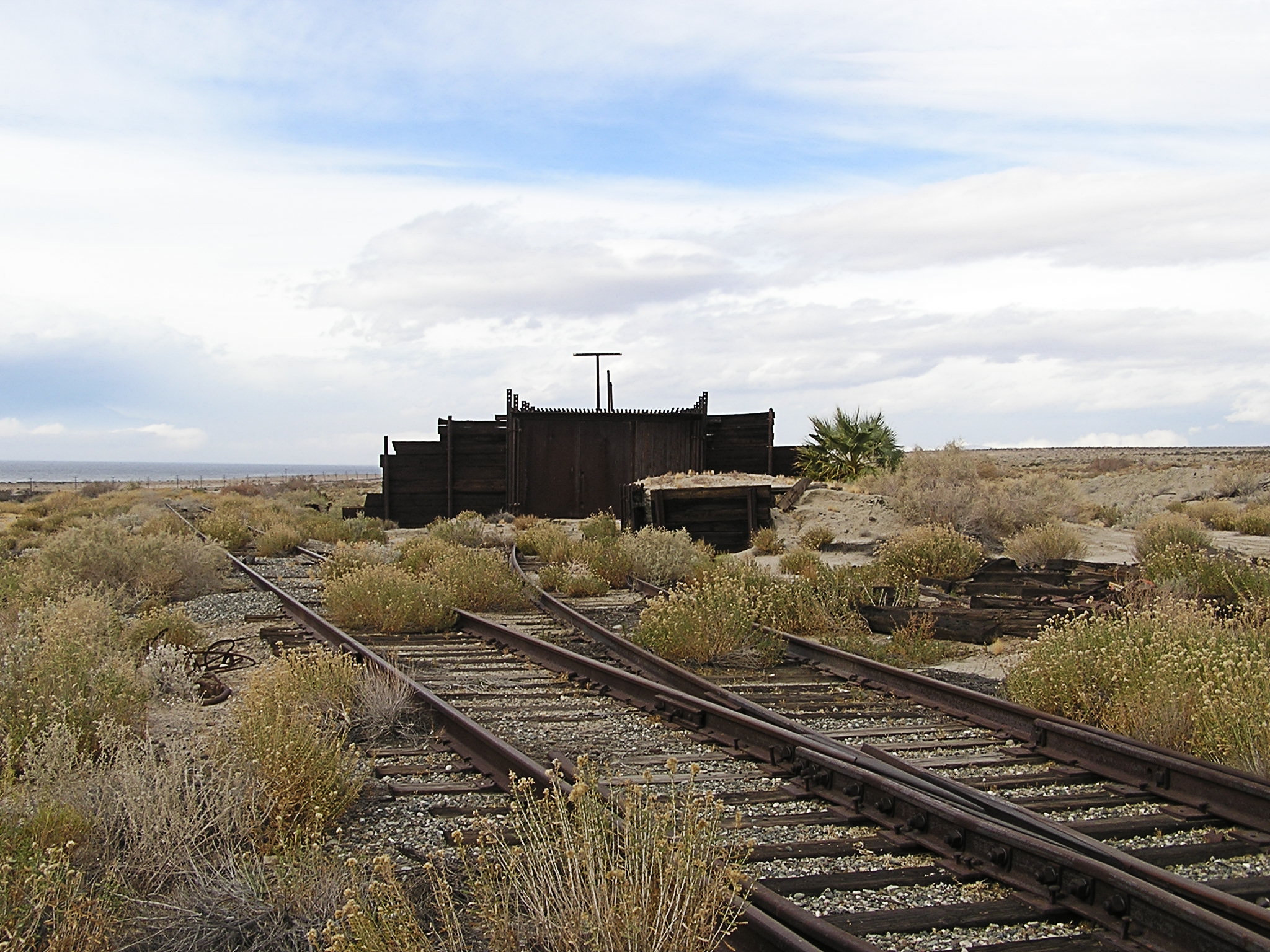
The maintenance equipment shed at the Ferrum end of the Eagle Mountain Railroad.

== In popular culture ==
- A critical scene in the 1945 film Detour takes place, according to the film's narration, outside a highway gas station "near the airport at Desert Center".
- A portion of the Eagle Mountain Railroad south of Desert Center was used in the filming of the movie Tough Guys, which is a 1986 comedy starring Burt Lancaster, Kirk Douglas, Eli Wallach and Dana Carvey. Tough Guys was the final collaboration for Burt Lancaster and Kirk Douglas.
- Films using Desert Center locations:
  - Tough Guys (1986)
  - Terminator 2: Judgment Day (1991)
  - H. G. Wells' War of the Worlds (2005)
  - Desert Road End (2006)
  - Falling Objects (2006)
  - Unknown (2006)
  - Battle of Los Angeles Eagle Mountain Mine site (2011)
