= Army Camps at Goffs =

Former U.S. Army camps in Mojave Desert, California

Army camps at Goffs
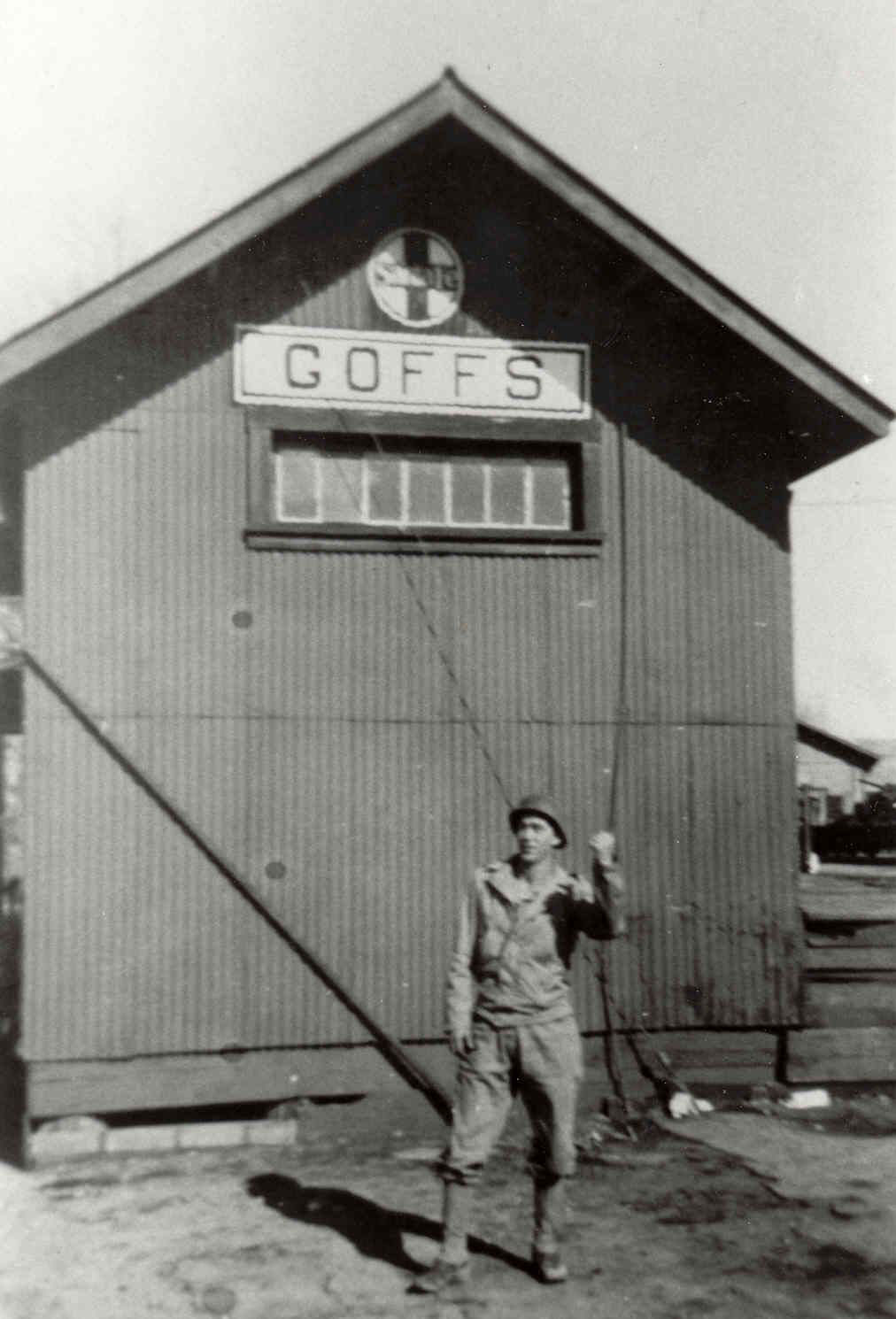
- Soldier at the east end of Goffs depot, 1943

- Location within California
- 34°56′12″N 115°04′06″W
- Location: near Goffs, California

History
- Built: 1942

Site notes
- Area: 426 acres (172 ha)
- Architect: US Army

California Historical Landmark
- Reference no.: 985

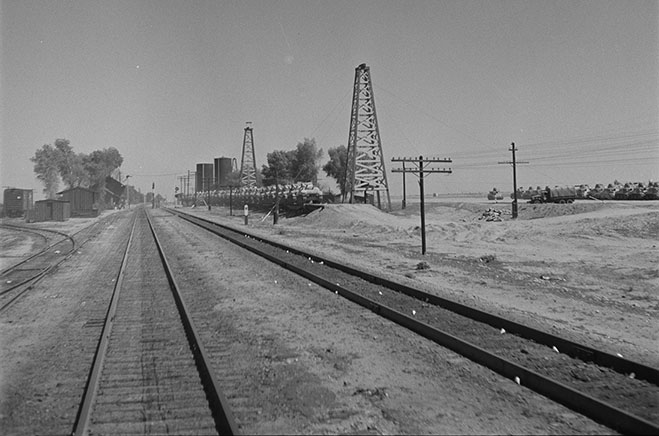
Goffs Army depot sidings in 1943

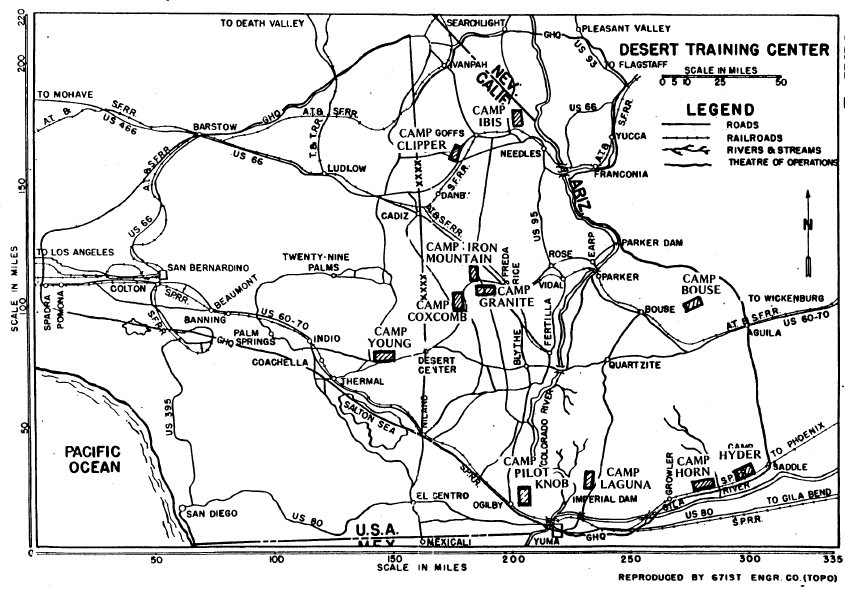
Map of Desert training center with camps at Goffs

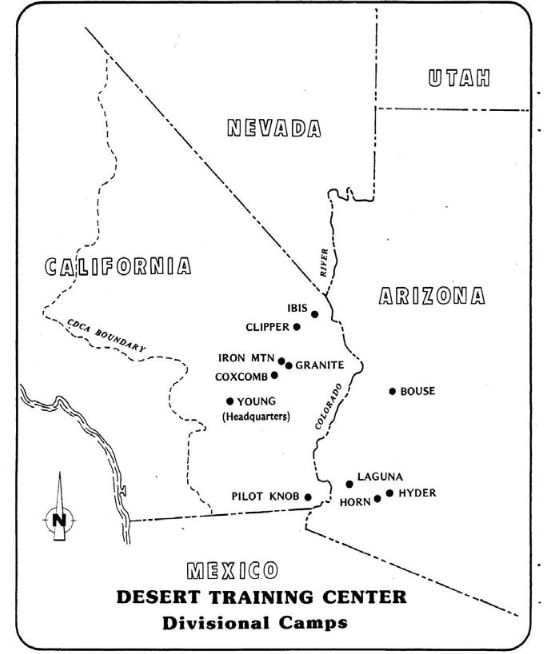
Desert Training Center map US Army 1943

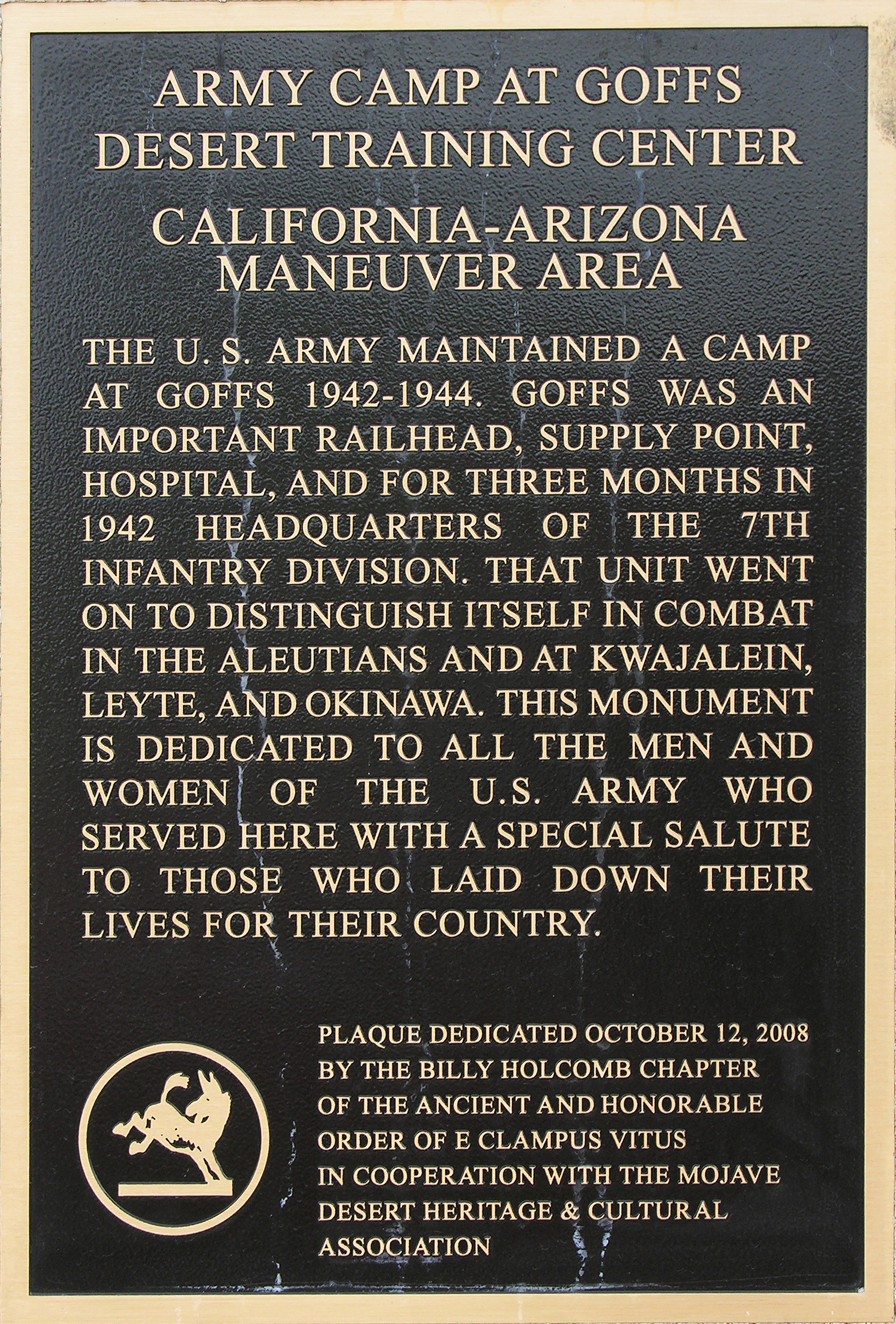
Desert Training Center, California-Arizona Maneuver Area, former camps at Goffs, Mojave Desert. Unfortunately, the sign is a bit wrong. It was the 7th Motorized Division.

There were several different WWII Army camps in the Goffs area. As this area was only a railroad stop with a small town, the camp areas never had a proper Army name like the large Desert Training Center divisional camps. Units were just stationed at "Goffs". Some of these camps were QM (QuarterMaster), Evac Hospitals and RHD (Rail Head Div., for unloading goods). The Goffs camp area was part of the US Army Desert Training Center in Riverside County, California. The sites of the camps around basically surrounded the former Santa Fe Railroad depot at Goffs, California. Goffs is on U.S. Route 66, 6 miles (as the crow flies) north of the current Interstate 40 and 25 miles (40 km) west of Needles in San Bernardino County, California. Currently at the south east end of the Mojave National Preserve. The camps at Goffs were 18 miles northeast of Camp Essex and Camp Clipper.

Built in 1942, the camps at Goffs were built to support the troops in divisional size camps training to do battle during World War II. As each unit moved in, they'd build shower buildings, latrines, wooden tent frames and water tanks. A firing range for training was also built. Goffs Army Ammunition Depot #4 was constructed to house ammunition, shells, practice landmines, etc. for use in divisional camp maneuvers. For safety, the ammunition storage was kept 3 miles south of the camps near Goffs Butte. The 7th Motorized Division (previously and later renamed the 7th Infantry Division) was stationed here from August 14, 1942, to October 18, 1942. They came from and returned to Camp San Luis Obispo, California. A total of 15,000 troops were stationed at the camps. All the Desert Training Center camps closed in May 1944.

== Stationed at Camp Goffs ==
- 51st Evacuation Hospital (AGF)
- 83rd Ordnance Battalion (AGF)
- 332nd Ordnance Motor Transport Company (redes. 332nd Ordnance Depot Company July 1943)
- 336th Ordnance Motor Transport Supply Company (AGF)
- 337th Ordnance Motor Transport Company (AGF)
- 530th OrdnanceHeavy Maintenance Company (Tank) (AGF)
- 3409th Ordnance Automotive Maintenance Company (AGF)
- Company C, 207th Quartermaster Gasoline Supply Battalion (AGF)
- Company F, 473rd Quartermaster Truck Regiment (AGF)
- Company C, 537th Quartermaster Service Battalion (Colored) (AGF)
- 554th Quartermaster Railhead Company (AGF)
- Detachment, 615th Ordnance Ammunition Company (AGF)
- 2 Platoons, Company A, 694th Quartermaster Laundry Battalion (AGF)

== As of 3/15/44, List of Combat Zone Units, C-AMA ==
- 458th Collecting Co.
- 102nd Evacuation Hospital (SM)
- 264th Ordnance Med Maint Co
- 558th Ord HM Co, (TK)
- 536th Ord (HM) Co Tk
- 183rd Ord Depot Co
- Hq & Hq Det & Med Det, 324th Ord Bn
- 461st Ord Evacuation Co
- Hq Det, 3rd QM Bn (Mobile)
- 196th Gas Supply Co
- 195th QM Gas Supply Co
- 231st QM Salv Collecting Co
- 563rd QM Railhead Co

== List of 7th Motorized Division Units sent to Goffs ==
- 7th Surg Hospital – 302 Officers & enlisted men
- Co. B 206th QM BN (GS) – 119
- Co. F 58th AMR (HM) – 263
- Hq & HQ Det 2nd & Cos C&R 58th QMR (HM) – 493
- 59th Evac Hospital – 327
- 8th QM Tr (Pk) (Cld) – 73
- 107th Cavalry (Mescz) – 304
- 7th Division Elements – 5,383
- 7th Division Elements – 7,345
- 115th Ord Co. – 134
- Total number officers and enlisted men from the 7th – 14,743

== 51st Evacuation Hospital ==
The 51st Evacuation Hospital was started by World War I veteran Dr. Orrin S. Cook. Dr. Orrin Cook worked at Mercy General Hospital, Sacramento, California. He asked the US Army Medical Department to start Army field hospital in Sacramento. With Colonel William E. Shamborra activation start and was headquartered at Fort Ord in Monterey, California. 51st Evacuation Hospital became official in September 1942 stationed now at Fort Lewis in Tacoma, Washington. The 51st Evacuation Hospital operated a 750-bed Evacuation Hospital Colonel Wendell A. Weller was the first Commanding Officer. In March 1943 the 51st Evacuation Hospital was moved to Fort Lewis and to camp Goffs arriving in April 1943, to support the Desert Training Center. Goffs, California in April 1943. In May 1943 some of the 51st were moved to support the Banning General Hospital. In December 1943 much of the 51st move to Camp San Luis Obispo, California. The 51st moved to Camp Cooke, Oceano, California for training. In March 1944 the 51st moved to the staging area at Camp Patrick Henry, Oriana, Virginia. From staging area 51st traveled 23 day by a Liberty Ship to Oran, Algeria. After 2 months the 51st moved to Naples, Italy and ran a hospital at the Naples Fair Grounds till 11 August 1944. Next the 51st moved to Draguignan and set up an Evacuation Hospital. On 29 September 1944 the 51st moved to Vincey, France. In November 1944 they moved to Saint-Dié-des-Vosges. On 14 March 1945 they moved to Sarre-Union, France. On 24 March 1945 they moved to Neustadt, Germany. On 4 April 1945 they moved to Walldürn, and to Welzheim on 20 April 1945. On 20 July 1945 they moved to Stuttgart. On 12 October 1945 they ended working Germany and shipped home. On were sent to the 216th General Hospital in Bad Cannstatt in Germany.

== Goffs Army Landing Strip ==
The landing strip was one mile to the north of the Goffs schoolhouse (Army PX). The air strip was used to support training activities and the depot. The runway was used for small planes, like the L-4 Piper aircraft so the vast training grounds could be watched from the air. This is not to be confused with the civil landing area 2.25 mi NE of the schoolhouse which was abandoned in the late 1930s.[6]

== Marker ==
Marker 136 at Goffs in California reads:

- The U. S. Army maintained a camp at Goffs 1942–1944. Goffs was an important rail supply point, hospital, and for three months in 1942 Headquarters of the 7th Infantry Division. That unit went on to distinguish itself in combat in the Aleutians and at Kwajalein, Leyte, and Okinawa. This monument is dedicated to all the men and women of the U. S. Army who served here with a special salute to those who laid down their lives for their country.

Erected 2008 by Billy Holcomb Chapter E Clampus Vitus in cooperation with the Mojave Desert Heritage & Cultural Association. (Marker Number 136.)

NOTE: In reference to the 7th Inf. Div., they were called the 7th Motorized Division at that period in time.

== Goffs, California ==
Goffs, California is an unincorporated community in San Bernardino County, California. It was built by the Santa Fe Railroad as Mojave Desert rail station. Santa Fe rail workers lived in the town. Before 1931 Goffs was busy stop on the famous Route 66. when a more direct route between Needles and Amboy was built. Near by town are to the east the town of Homer, to the southwest the town of Fenner and to the north the towns of Blackburn and Purdy. From 1893 to 1902 the town was called 'Blake after Isaac Blake who constructed the Nevada Southern Railway. The Nevada Southern Railway later became part of the California Eastern Railway that operated from 1895 to 1923. To serve the travels and the Santa Fe rail workers there was a large general store, now abandoned. To teach the children of the rail workers, in 1914 a schoolhouse was built. The schoolhouse is now a mining and military museum called the Mojave Desert Heritage and Cultural Association (MDHCA). There are many abandoned mines around Goffs.

== See also ==
- California Historical Landmarks in San Bernardino County, California
- California Historical Landmarks in Riverside County, California
- Camp Coxcomb
- Camp Granite
- Camp Iron Mountain
- Camp Ibis
- California during World War II
