= Needles Station Hospital =

California Historic Landmark

- Location within California
- 34°49′18″N 114°36′31″W
- Location: Needles, California

History
- Built: 1942

Site notes
- Architect: US Army

Needles Station Hospital was US army Hospital built to support the training at the camps of the vast World War II Desert Training Center. Needles Station Hospital was located in the City of Needles, California in San Bernardino County, California. The main headquarters for the Desert Training Center was Camp Young where General Patton's 3rd Armored Division was stationed. Needles Station Hospital was on 875 acres of land and was open from 1942 to 1943. The hospital had two 250 bed hospital units. The hospital and camp was built using temporary buildings. Due to a shortage of manpower, Prisoner of War at the Hospital Camp volunteered to work at the hospital. The land was transferred back to the Department of the Interior on December 16, 1944. The site today is a mix of open land and housing. The Federal Property ID number is J09CA0507.

== See also ==
- California Historical Landmarks in San Bernardino County, California
- California Historical Landmarks in Riverside County, California
- Camp Coxcomb
- Camp Granite
- Camp Iron Mountain
- Camp Clipper and Camp Essex
- Camp Coxcomb
- California during World War II
