= Camp Pilot Knob =

Historical US Army sub camp in California

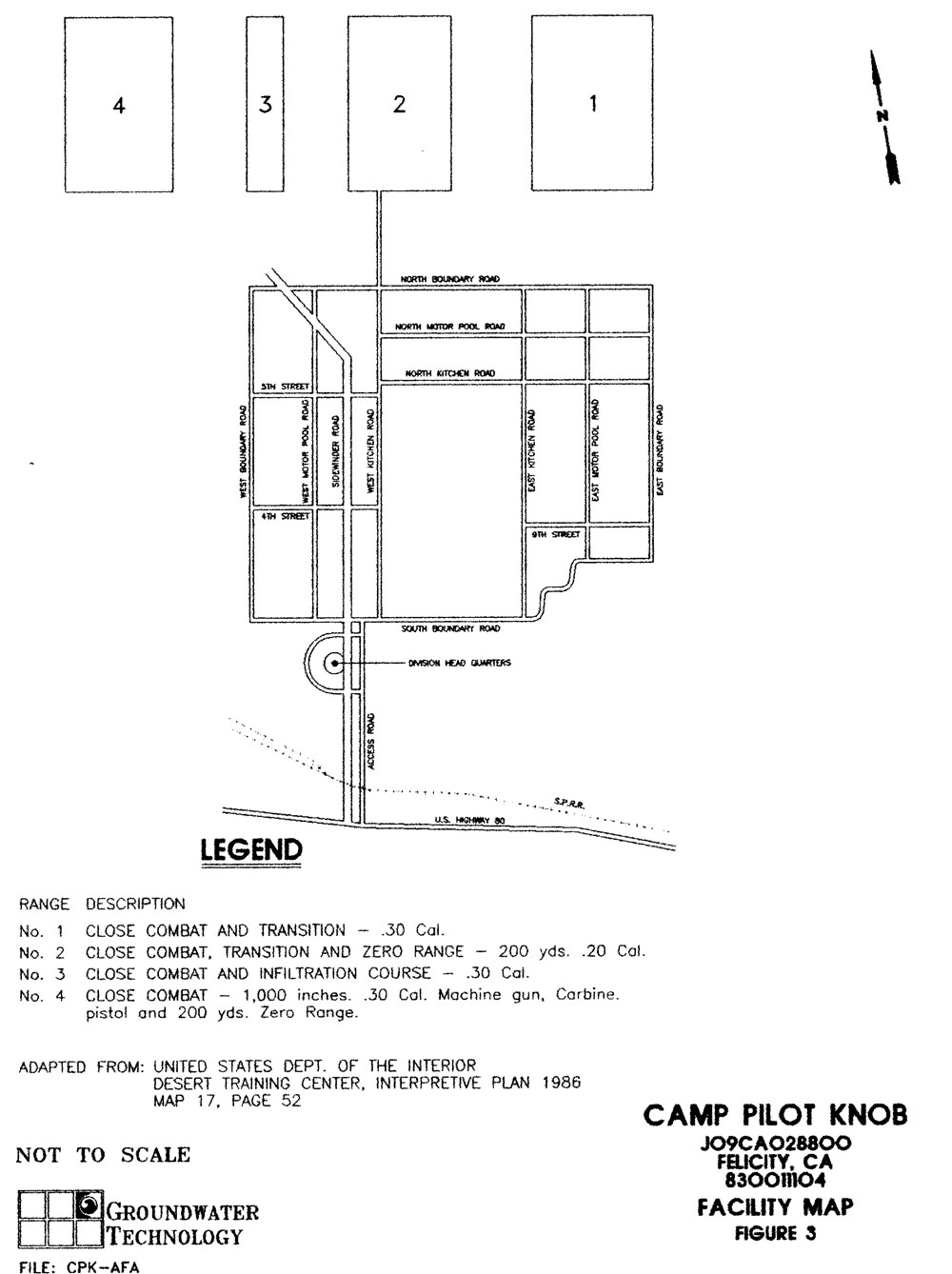
- Map of Camp Pilot Knob in 1943

- Location within California
- 32°45′03″N 114°45′17″W
- Location: Felicity, California

History
- Built: April 1943

Site notes
- Area: 4,000 acres (1,600 ha)
- Architect: US Army

California Historical Landmark
- Reference no.: 985

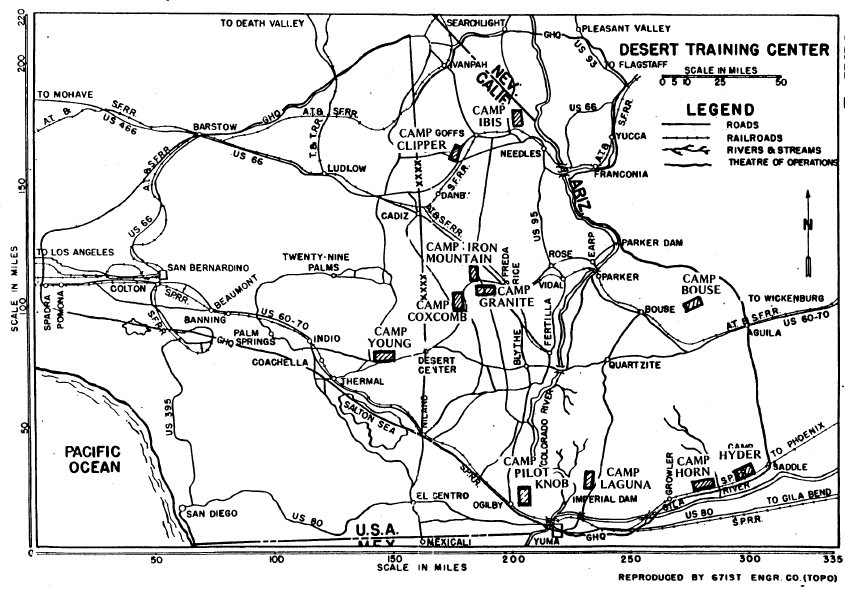
Map of Desert training center with Camp Pilot Knob visible just right of center, towards the bottom

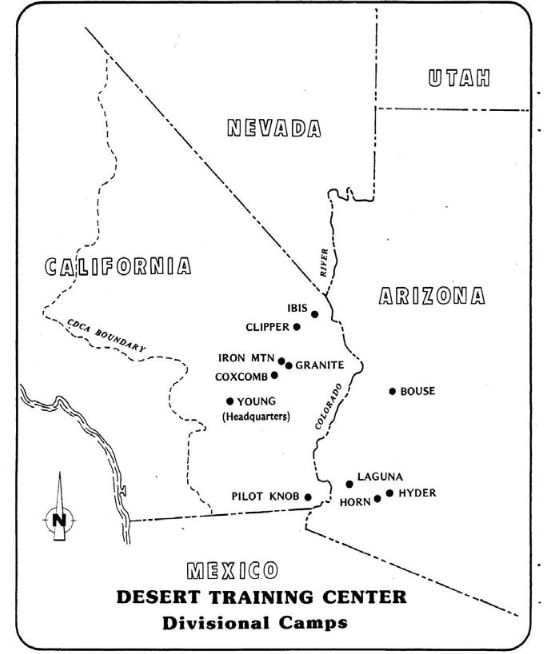
Desert Training Center map US Army 1943

The Camp Pilot Knob was a sub camp of the US Army, Desert Training Center in Imperial County, California. The main headquarters for the Desert Training Center was Camp Young, this is where General Patton's 3rd Armored Division was stationed. Camp Pilot Knob was designated a California Historic Landmark (No.985). Camp Pilot Knob is near Felicity, California, in Imperial County, California. Camp Pilot Knob is 2 miles north of the US-Mexico border, just north of the now Interstate 8. The camp is five miles northwest of Yuma, Arizona and 2 miles west of the Colorado River. The camp was built just north of the Felicity train station, which was used to bring the troops and supplies to the camp. The camp is named after a hill south of the camp.

== History ==
Camp Pilot Knob was built in April 1943. The Camp Pilot Knob was built to prepare troops to do battle in Europe to fight the Nazis during World War II. When completed the camp had shower buildings, latrines, wooden tent frames, water storage tanks and a water treatment plant. North of the camp were a number of fire ranges for training Troops. The camp was closed in June 1944. Trained at the camp from June 1943 to August 1943 was the 85th Infantry Division. From the camp the 85th was moved to Italy to fight Nazis. The 6th Infantry Division trained at the camp, they departed to fight in the New Guinea campaign and the Battle of Luzon. Also trained at the camp was the 36th Reconnaissance Squadron and 44th Reconnaissance Squadron. To both train and serve the troop, the 54th Evacuation Hospital operated at the camp.

== Marker ==
Marker 985 at the Camp Pilot Knob site reads:

Camp Pilot Knob was a unit of the Desert Training Center, established by General George S. Patton Jr., to prepare American troops for battle during World War II. It was the largest military training ground ever to exist. At the peak of activity here at Pilot Knob, June – December, 1943, the 85th Infantry Division, and the 36th and 44th Reconnaissance Squadrons of the 11th (Mechanized) Cavalry trained for roles in the liberation of Europe, 1944–45.

Erected 1990 by State Department of Parks and Recreation in cooperation with the Bureau of Land Management and John P. Squibob Chapter No. 1853, E Clampus Vitus. (Marker Number 985.)

== See also ==
- California Historical Landmarks in Imperial County
- California Historical Landmarks in San Bernardino County, California
- California Historical Landmarks in Riverside County, California
- Camp Granite
- Camp Iron Mountain
- Camp Clipper and Camp Essex
- Camp Ibis
- California during World War II
