= Banning General Hospital =

World War II US military hospital in Banning, California

Coordinates: 33.9303°N 116.9180°W

Banning General Hospital Naval Convalescent Hospital, Banning
- Part of Desert Training Center
- Banning, California

Site information
- Type: Military hospital
- Controlled by: United States Army, United States Navy
- Condition: Demolished

Site history
- Built: 1943
- Demolished: 1948

Banning General Hospital, later the Naval Convalescent Hospital, Banning, was a U.S. military hospital in Banning, California, built in 1943 to support training at the Desert Training Center. Built by the army as a 1,000-bed hospital, it was transferred to the navy in 1944. In 1948 the site was declared surplus, all buildings were removed, and the leased land was returned to the original owners.

== History ==
It was a military hospital used from 1943 to 1944.

== See also ==
- Camp Coxcomb
- Camp Granite
- Camp Iron Mountain
- Camp Ibis
- California during World War II
