= Desert Training Center =

US Army training centers during World War II

- Part of United States Army
- Southern California/Western Arizona
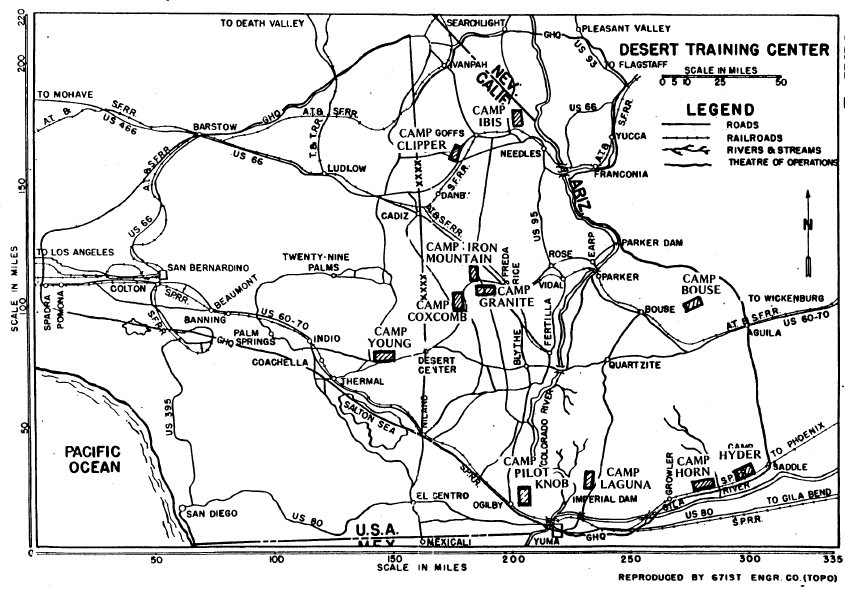
- Map of Desert Training Center

Site information
- Type: Army Training Area

Location
- Coordinates: 33°40′N 115°43′W

Site history
- Built: 1942
- In use: 1942–1944

Garrison information
- Past commanders: Major General George S. Patton, Jr., April–August 1942.

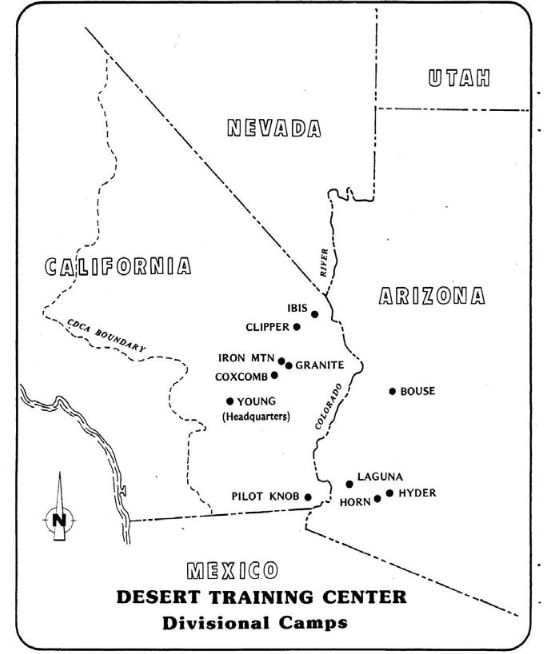
Desert Training Center map US Army 1943

The Desert Training Center (DTC), also known as California–Arizona Maneuver Area (CAMA), was a World War II training facility established in the Mojave Desert and Sonoran Desert, largely in Southern California and Western Arizona in 1942.

Its mission was to train United States Army and Army Air Forces units and personnel to live and fight in the desert, to test and develop suitable equipment, and to develop tactical doctrines, techniques and training methods.

It was a key training facility for units engaged in combat during the 1942–1943 North African campaign. It stretched from the outskirts of Pomona, California, eastward to within 50 miles (80 km) of Phoenix, Arizona, southward to the suburbs of Yuma, Arizona, and northward into the southern tip of Nevada.

== History ==
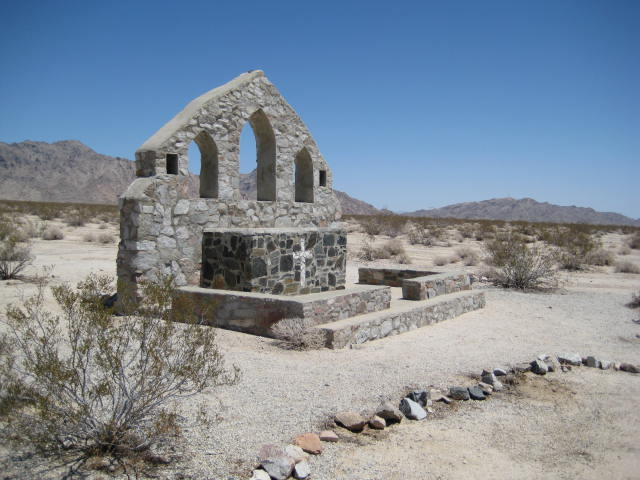
Catholic Chapel at Camp Iron Mountain, WW2 era. Camp Iron Mountain is the best-preserved divisional camp today. Now preserved in Mojave Trails National Monument.

This simulated theater of operation was the largest military training ground in the history of military maneuvers. A site near Shavers Summit (now known as Chiriaco Summit) between Indio and Desert Center, was selected as the headquarters of the DTC. The site, called Camp Young after the first commandant of the Army War College and the first Army Chief of Staff Samuel Baldwin Marks Young, was the world's largest army post.

Major General George S. Patton Jr. came to Camp Young as the first commanding general of the DTC. As a native of southern California, Patton knew the area well from his youth and from having participated in army maneuvers in the Mojave Desert in the 1930s. His first orders were to select other areas within the desert that would be suitable for the large-scale maneuvers necessary to prepare American soldiers for combat against the German Afrika Korps in the North African desert.

Patton and his advanced team designated various locations within the area where tent camps would be built. The camps were situated so that each unit could train individually without interfering with the other. Airfields, hospitals, supply depots and sites for other support services were selected as was a corps maneuvering area. The plan was that each division and or major unit would train in its own area, and near the end of its training period would participate in a corps (two divisions or more) exercise in the corps maneuvering area at Palen Pass. Upon completion of the corps exercise, the trained units would leave the DTC, and new units would arrive to begin their training and the process repeated.

By March 1943, the North African campaign was in its final stages and the primary mission of the DTC had changed. By the middle of 1943, the troops who originally came for desert training maneuvers were now deployed worldwide. Therefore, to reflect that change in mission, the name of the center was changed to the California-Arizona Maneuver Area (C-AMA or CAMA). The CAMA was to serve as a theater of operations to train combat troops, service units and staff under conditions similar to those which might be encountered overseas. The CAMA was enlarged to include both a communications zone and combat zone, approximately 350 miles (560 km) wide and 250 miles (400 km) long. Due to a severe deficit of service units beginning in the winter of 1943, it was decided that maneuvers in CAMA would cease as of 15 April 1944, with internal operations continuing until 1 May, after which the center would be officially discontinued.

=== Lineage ===
- Activated 1 April 1942
- Redesignated California-Arizona Maneuver Area, 20 October 1943
- Closed 1 July 1944

== Facilities ==
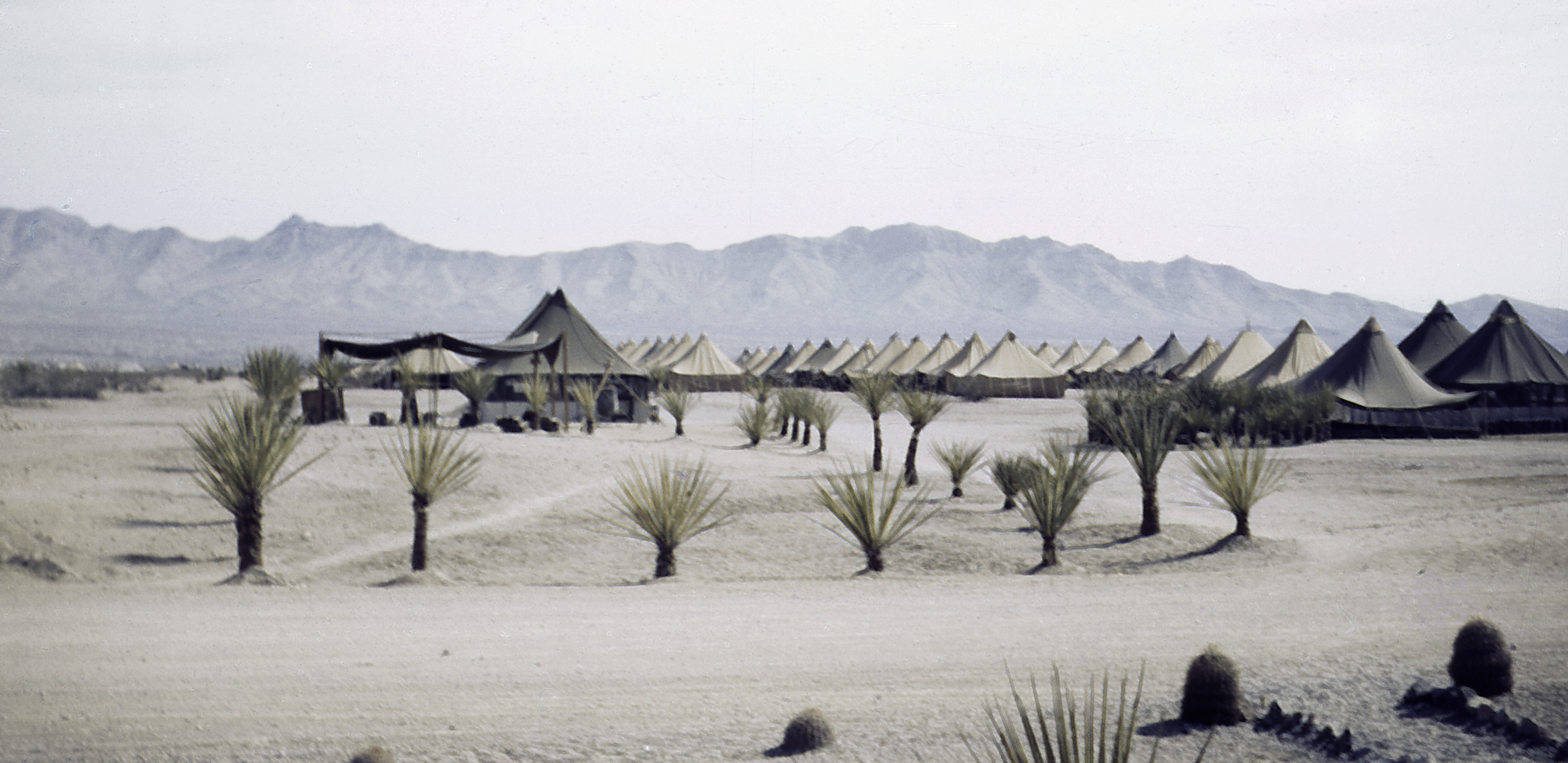
Camp Ibis, 607th Tank Destroyer Battalion, circa 1942

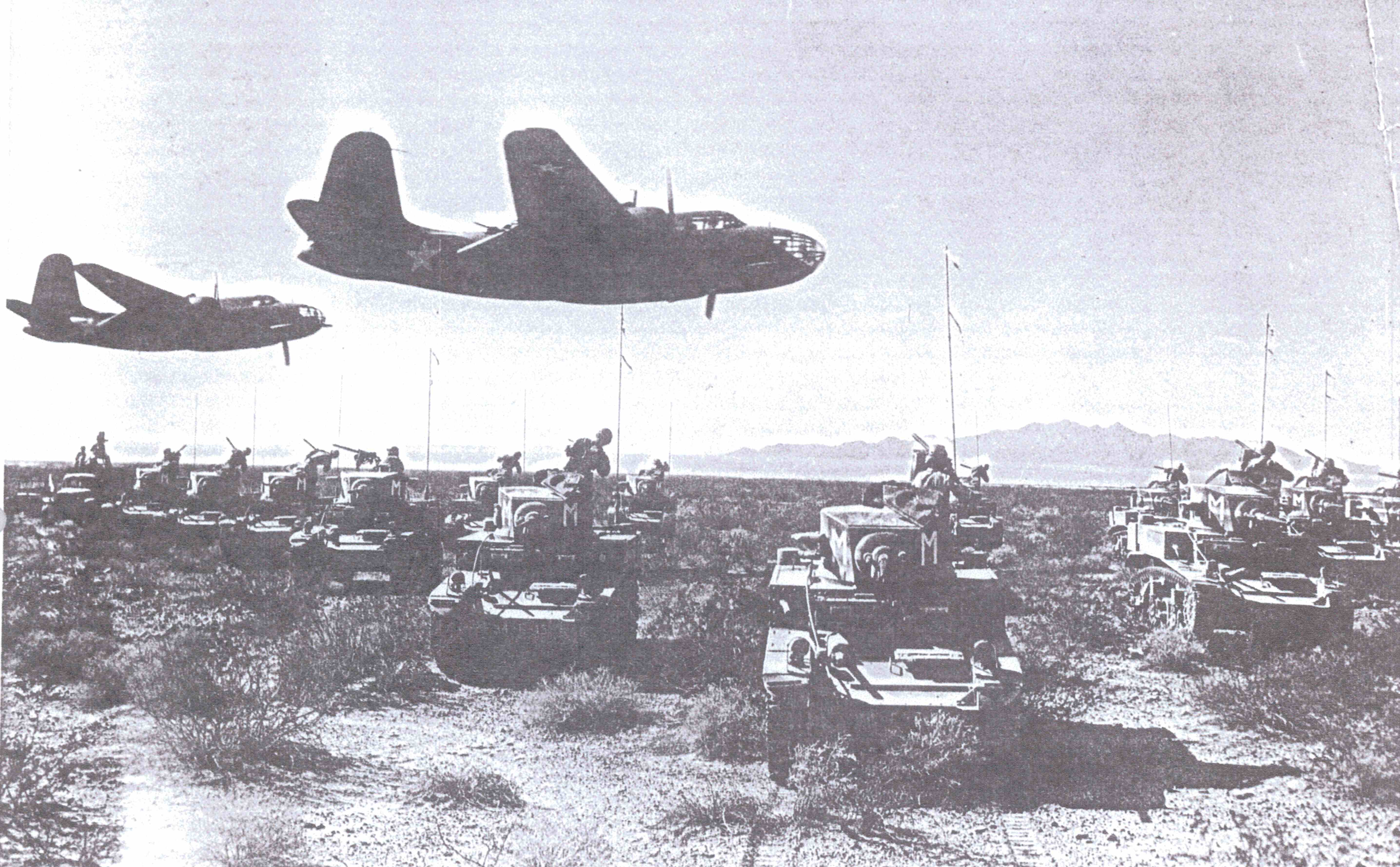
Training at Camp Iron Mountain, 1942

=== Army divisional camps ===
- Camp Bouse (secret camp)
- Camp Clipper and Camp Essex
- Camp Coxcomb
- Camp Granite
- Camp Hyder
- Camp Horn
- Camp Ibis
- Camp Iron Mountain
- Camp Laguna
- Camp Pilot Knob
- Camp Young Desert Training Center Headquarters

=== Army depots ===
- Camps at Freda, Quartermaster Depot
- Camp Desert Center
- Camps at Goffs – Depot and Infantry training.
- Pomona Ordnance Depot
- San Bernardino Engineer Depot

=== Army airfields ===
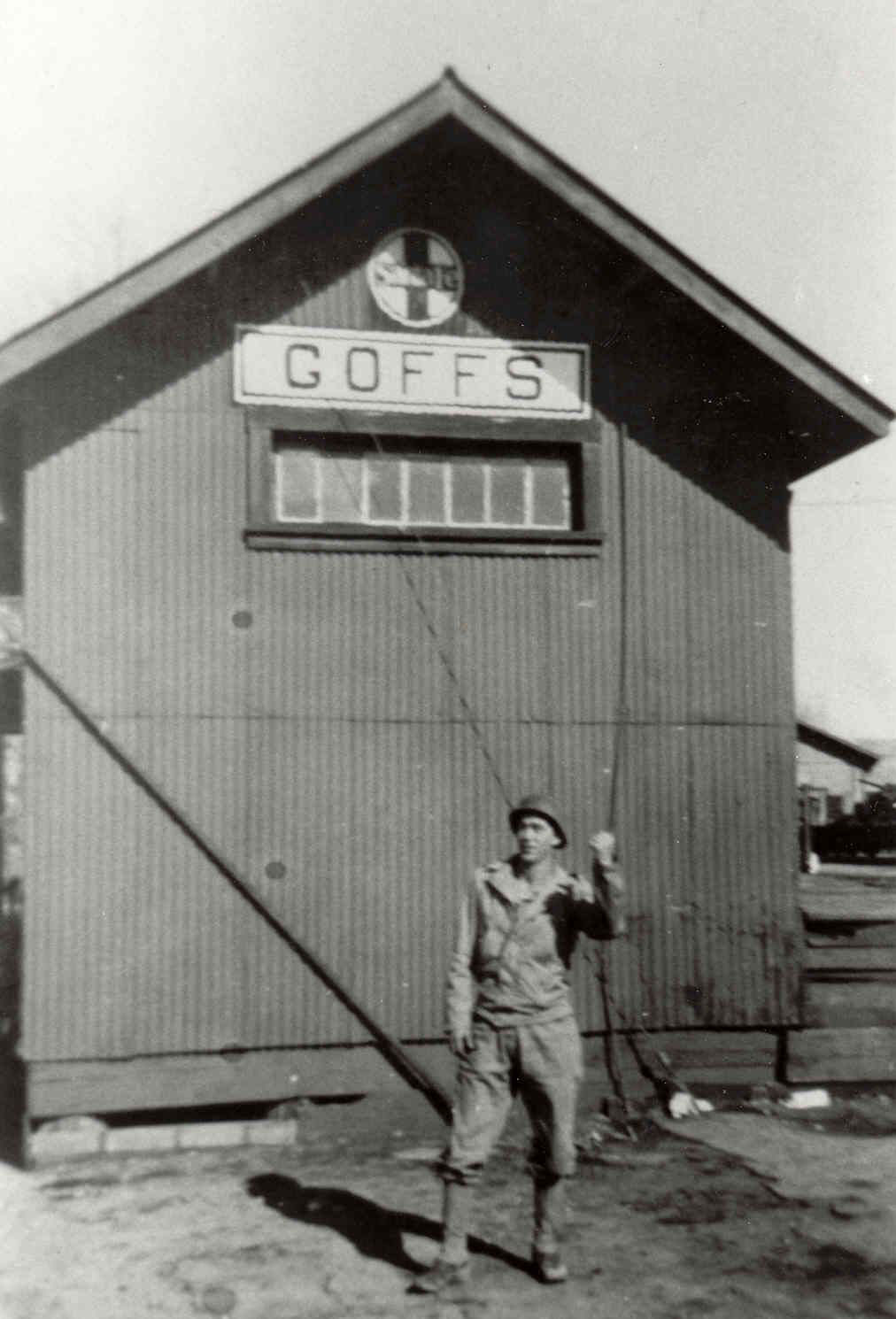
Goffs, CA Depot, 1943

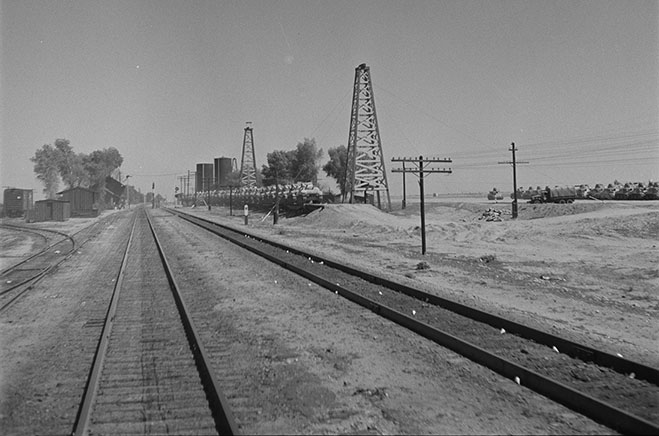
Goffs, CA Railroad sidings, 1943

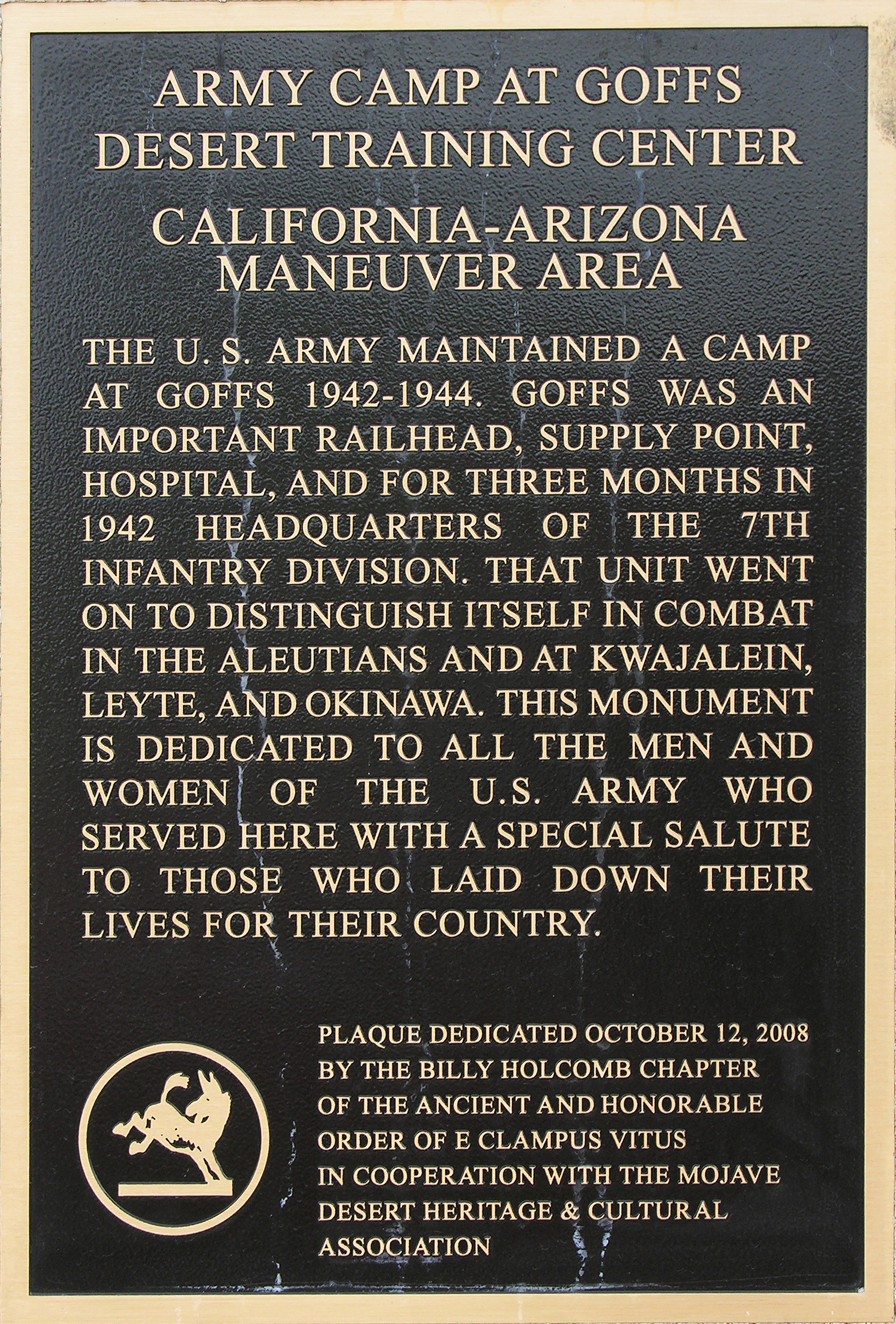
Desert Training Center, California-Arizona Maneuver Area, former Camps at Goffs, Mojave Desert. It was actually the 7th Motorized Division, not Infantry Division at this point in time.

- Major airfields
  - Blythe Army Air Base
  - Desert Center Army Air Field
  - Thermal Army Air Field
  - Rice Army Air Field
  - Shavers Summit Army Air Field (now Chiriaco Summit Airport)
- Minor airfields
  - Camp Coxcomb Army Field (Freda, CA; abandoned) 33°55′12″N 115°14′24″W
  - Dateland Air Force Auxiliary Field – abandoned
  - Camp Essex Army Field (Essex, CA; abandoned) 34°46′19″N 115°13′15″W
  - Goffs Army Field (Goffs, CA; abandoned) 34°56′12″N 115°04′04″W
  - Camp Ibis Army Field (Ibis, CA; abandoned) 34°58′12″N 114°50′23″W
  - Camp Iron Mountain Army Field (15 miles (24 km) west of Rice, CA) 34°05′58″N 115°06′29″W
  - Laguna Army Air Field – in use at Yuma Proving Ground 32°51′36″N 114°23′48″W
  - Camp Horn Army Air Field – abandoned

=== Hospitals ===
- Banning General Hospital (Banning, CA)
- Camps at Freda Hospital
- Camp Desert Center Hospital
- Camps at Goffs Hospital
- Torney General Hospital in Palm Springs
- Needles Station Hospital
- Cherry Valley Hospital in Beaumont

== Mohave Maneuver Area C ==
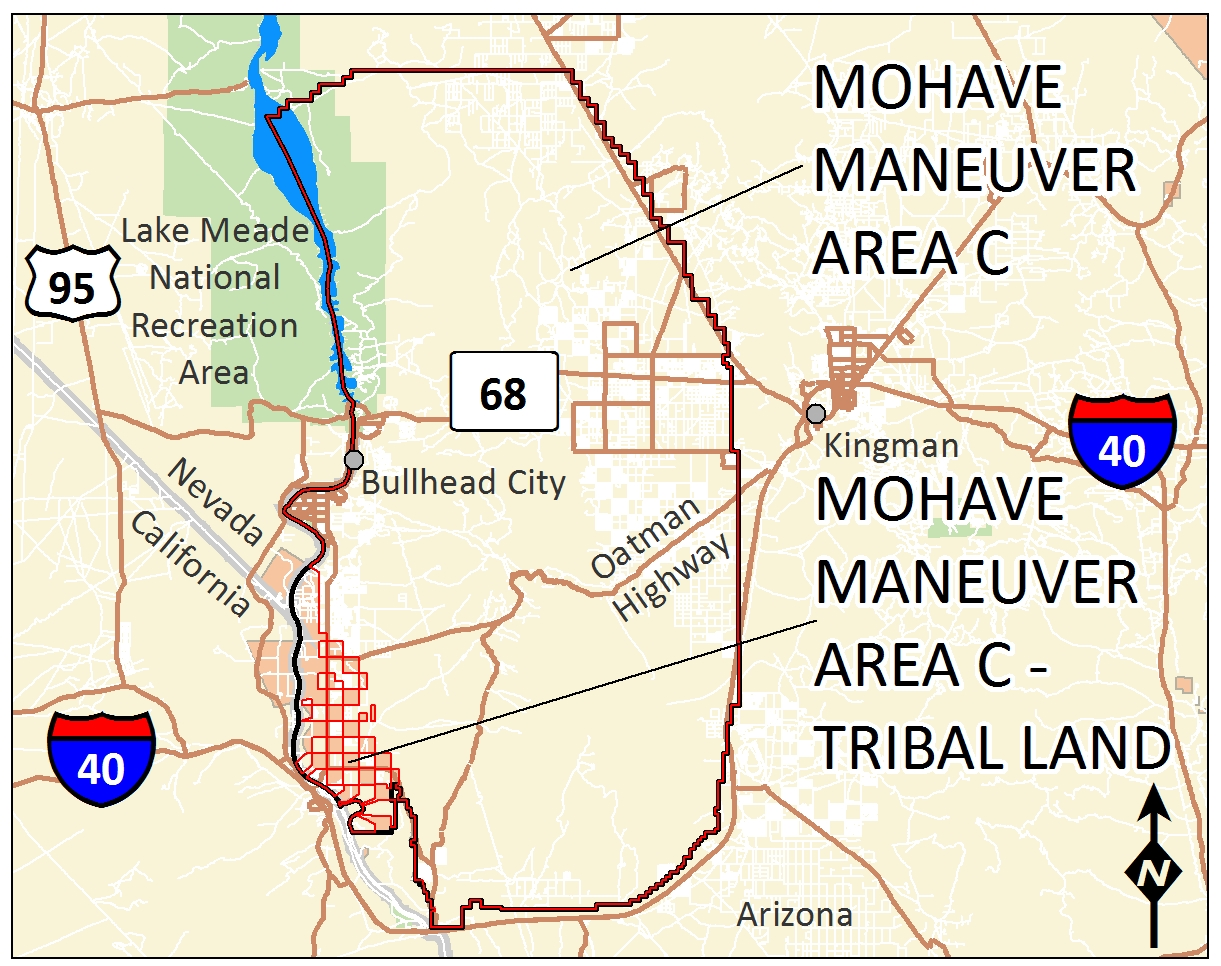
Desert Training Center Mohave Maneuver Area C

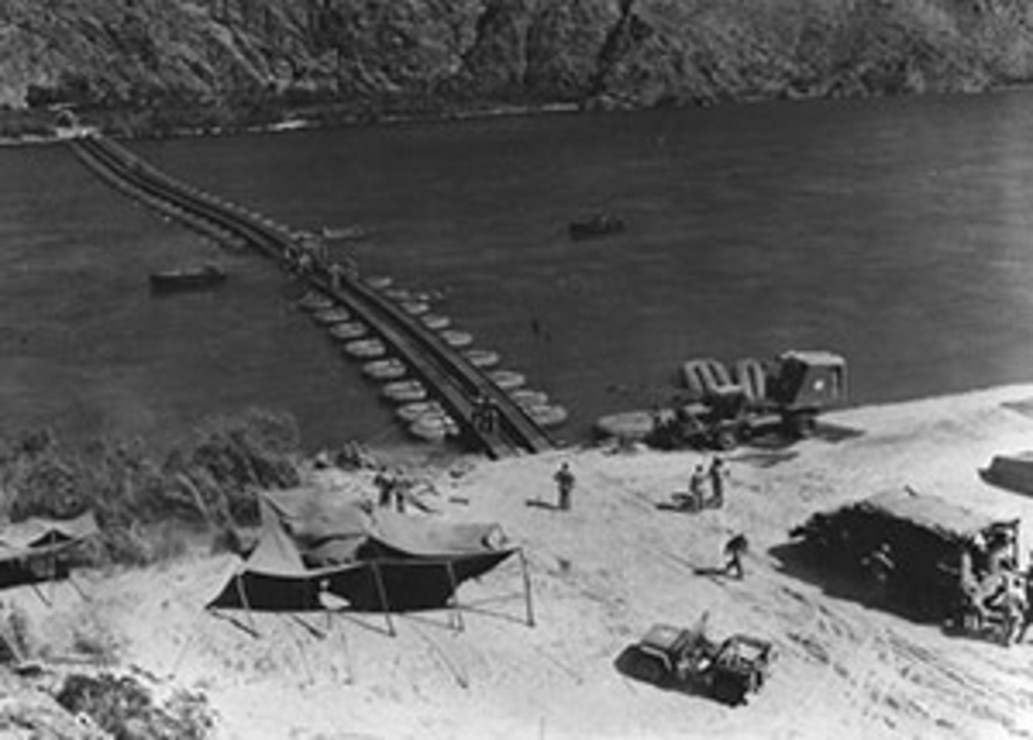
Former Desert Training Center Mohave Maneuver Area C. River crossing during Exercise Desert Strike in 1964

In May 1964 part of the former Desert Training Center was reacquired for the purpose of Exercise Desert Strike. The former Mohave Maneuver Area C was included in this area and used as part of the training ground for the two-week exercise. The exercise had large maneuvers and some river crossing training. Mohave Maneuver Area C was 781,452 acres (316,242 ha) located in Mohave County, Arizona.

== Present day sites ==
Much of the training area is preserved in Mojave National Preserve and Mojave Trails National Monument, along with various other state and federal protected lands. Most of the sites can be visited, but some are difficult to reach. In most cases the only things that remain at the camp sites are streets, sidewalks, building foundations, patterns of hand-laid rocks for various purposes and trash dumps.

Monuments have been erected at some of the camp sites and there are areas within CAMA that are fenced off with danger signs warning of unexploded ordnance.

The General George S. Patton Memorial Museum is located near the former entrance of Camp Young.

== California Historical Landmark ==
California Historical Landmarks Marker at Desert Training Center sites reads:

Camp Pilot Knob – Imperial

- NO. 985 DESERT TRAINING CENTER, CALIFORNIA–ARIZONA MANEUVER AREA (ESTABLISHED BY MAJOR GENERAL GEORGE S. PATTON, JR.) – CAMP PILOT KNOB – Camp Pilot Knob was a unit of the Desert Training Center, established by General George S. Patton, Jr., to prepare American troops for battle during World War II. It was the largest military training ground ever to exist. At the peak of activity here at Pilot Knob, June–December 1943, the 85th Infantry Division, and the 36th and 44th Reconnaissance Squadrons of the 11th (Mechanized) Cavalry trained here for roles in the liberation of Europe, 1944–45.

Camp Young – Riverside

- NO. 985 DESERT TRAINING CENTER, CALIFORNIA–ARIZONA MANEUVER AREA (ESTABLISHED BY MAJOR GENERAL GEORGE S. PATTON, JR.) – CAMP YOUNG – The D.T.C. was established by Major General George S. Patton, Jr., in response to a need to train American combat troops for battle in North Africa during World War II. The camp, which began operation in 1942, covered 18,000 square miles (47,000 km^{2}). It was the largest military training ground ever to exist. Over one million men were trained at the eleven sub-camps (seven in California).

Camp Granite – Riverside

- NO. 985 DESERT TRAINING CENTER, CALIFORNIA–ARIZONA MANEUVER AREA (ESTABLISHED BY MAJOR GENERAL GEORGE S. PATTON, JR.) – CAMP GRANITE – Camp Granite was established at this site in the Spring of 1942. It was one of twelve such camps built in the southwestern desert to harden and train United States troops for service on the battlefields of World War II. The Desert Training Center was a simulated theater of operations that included portions of California, Arizona and Nevada. The other camps were Young, Granite, Iron Mountain, Ibis, Clipper, Pilot Knob, Laguna, Horn, Hyder, Bouse and Rice. A total of 13 infantry divisions and 7 armored divisions plus numerous smaller units were trained in this harsh environment. The Training Center was in operation for almost 2 years and was closed early in 1944 when the last units were shipped overseas. During the brief period of operation over one million American soldiers were trained for combat.

Camp Coxcomb – Riverside

- NO. 985 DESERT TRAINING CENTER, CALIFORNIA–ARIZONA MANEUVER AREA (ESTABLISHED BY MAJOR GENERAL GEORGE S. PATTON, JR.) – CAMP COXCOMB – Camp Coxcomb was established at this site in the Spring of 1942. It was one of twelve such camps built in the southwestern desert to harden and train United States troops for service on the battlefields of World War II. The Desert Training Center was a simulated theater of operations that included portions of California, Arizona and Nevada. The other camps were Young, Granite, Iron Mountain, Ibis, Clipper, Pilot Knob, Laguna, Horn, Hyder, Bouse and Rice. A total of 13 infantry divisions and 7 armored divisions plus numerous smaller units were trained in this harsh environment. The Training Center was in operation for almost 2 years and was closed early in 1944 when the last units were shipped overseas. During the brief period of operation over one million American soldiers were trained for combat.

Camp Iron Mountain – San Bernardino

- NO. 985 DESERT TRAINING CENTER, CALIFORNIA–ARIZONA MANEUVER AREA (ESTABLISHED BY MAJOR GENERAL GEORGE S. PATTON, JR.) – CAMP IRON MOUNTAIN – Iron Mountain Divisional Camp was established at this site in the Spring of 1942. One of eleven such camps built in the California–Arizona Desert to harden and train United States troops for service on the battlefields of World War II. The first major unit trained here was the 3rd Armored Division followed by elements of the 4th, 5th, 6th, and 7th Armored Divisions. In all, one million men trained in the desert before the Training Center was officially closed in May 1944. The most unique feature built at this camp is the huge relief map built into the desert floor. It can still be seen (1985).'

Camp Clipper – San Bernardino

- NO. 985 DESERT TRAINING CENTER, CALIFORNIA–ARIZONA MANEUVER AREA (ESTABLISHED BY MAJOR GENERAL GEORGE S. PATTON, JR.) – CAMP CLIPPER – Camp Clipper was established at a site that reached from Essex Road to this location in the Spring of 1942. It was one of twelve such camps built in the southwestern deserts to harden and train United States troops for service on the battlefields of World War II. The Desert Training Center was a simulated theater of operations that included portions of California, Arizona, and Nevada. The other camps were Young, Coxcomb, Iron Mountain, Ibis, Granite, Pilot Knob, Laguna, Horn, Ryder, Bouse and Rice. A total of 13 infantry divisions and 7 armored divisions plus numerous smaller units were trained in this harsh environment. The Training Center was in operation for almost two years and was closed early in 1944 when the last units were shipped overseas. During the brief period of operation over one million American soldiers were trained for combat. The 33rd and 93rd Infantry Divisions were trained here.

Camp Ibis – San Bernardino

- NO. 985 DESERT TRAINING CENTER, CALIFORNIA–ARIZONA MANEUVER AREA (ESTABLISHED BY MAJOR GENERAL GEORGE S. PATTON, JR.) – CAMP IBIS – Camp Ibis was established at this site in the Spring of 1942 – one of eleven such camps built in the California–Arizona Desert to harden and train United States Troops for service on the battlefields of World War II. The 440th AAA AW Battalion was activated per General Order No. 1 at Camp Haan, CA on 1 July 1942. It trained at Camp M.A.A.R. (Irwin), Camps Young, Iron Mountain, Ibis, and then Camps Pickett, VA and Steward, GA. The battalion shipped out to England in December 1943 and landed in Normandy on D-3. The unit earned 5 Battle Stars and 2 Foreign Awards while serving with the 1st, 3rd, 7th, and 9th U.S. Armies, the 1st French Army and the 2nd British Army, 7 different corps and 5 different divisions. The 440th AAA AW BN was deactivated in December 1944.

== See also ==
- California during World War II
- American theater of World War II
- Military history of California
- California Historical Landmarks in Riverside County, California
- California Historical Landmarks in San Bernardino County, California
- U.S. Army Air Force flight training Twentynine Palms
- US Naval Bases North Africa
