= Essex, California =

Unincorporated community in California, United States

Essex
- Unincorporated community
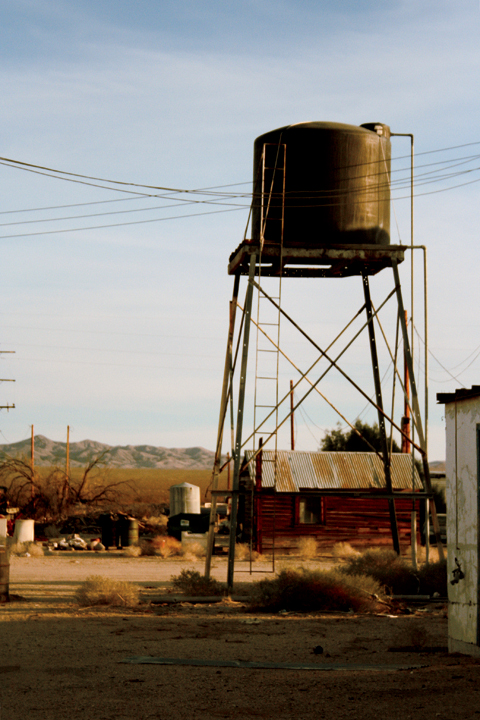
- Essex water tower in 2006

- Location within the state of California Essex (the United States)
- Coordinates: 34°44′1″N 115°14′42″W
- Country: United States
- State: California
- County: San Bernardino
- Developed: ca. 1915
- Elevation: 1,732 ft (528 m)

Population (2000)
  - Total: 111
  - Estimate (2013): ~10
- Time zone: UTC-8 (Pacific (PST))
  - Summer (DST): UTC-7 (PDT)
- ZIP codes: 92332
- Area codes: 442/760
- FIPS code: 06-22874
- GNIS feature ID: 1656508

Essex is a small unincorporated community in San Bernardino County, California. The settlement lies on National Old Trails Road (CR 66) – part of the old Route 66 – just south of Interstate 40 in the Mojave Desert.

== History ==
Essex, a former oasis along historic Route 66 in California, was allegedly founded when a motorist suffered a flat tire only to discover there were no garages for miles. The settlement lies along the former Atchison, Topeka and Santa Fe Railway, currently known as the BNSF Railway.

In Essex's heyday, there were a number of important buildings utilized by motorists and local patrons, including:

- Bell's Towing
- The Wayside Cafe
- Essex Post Office
- Essex Elementary School
- Essex Shell Tire Shop

Essex was notable along Route 66 for providing free water to travelers, thanks to a well installed by the Automobile Club of Southern California. Over a dozen homes also serviced the small community.

=== Television ===
The town of Essex had no television reception until 1977. The signal from Los Angeles, 150 miles west, was too weak, and the signal from Las Vegas, 110 miles north, was blocked by natural terrain. A device called a translator, costing thousands, could have solved the problem, but the town voted against spending the money. Johnny Carson found the town's lack of television interesting, and invited the entire town's population (about 50 people at the time) to attend the taping of the March 25, 1977 episode of The Tonight Show Starring Johnny Carson. He talked to five different townspeople about what it was like and whether they missed having television. The results were that most said they liked Essex without television. Shortly after the Tonight Show appearance, executives at Electronics, Missiles and Communications (Emcee), which make television transmitters, provided the town with a translator at no cost.

=== Today ===
Essex is on the verge of becoming one of many ghost towns scattered throughout the Southwestern United States displaced by the creation of Interstate 40. Essex Elementary School (founded 1937), which once served the educational needs of both Essex and its neighbor Goffs, has closed. It was once taught by a single teacher. Its location remote even with today's technological capabilities, Essex lacks many comforts of modern-day life, including various new types of technology.

Many of the homes and buildings in Essex have completely disappeared, almost fifty lie in abandonment, and of what was once a bustling roadside hub, only the post office, Caltrans maintenance yard, school house, and outdoor telephone are still operational. There are no facilities in town.

Essex has only one close neighbor, the equally abandoned Goffs, located to the north, just across I-40.

Three miles (4.8 km) northeast of Essex, just north of the Goffs Road Junction with National Old Trails Highway, the remains of Camp Essex Army Airfield are still visible. This uniquely configured airfield has two parallel runways and twelve hardstands, where aircraft could be parked.

== Population ==
In the 2000 census, the population was 111. In a 2005 estimate, the population was presumed to be 89. Between the 2000 Census and the 2005 estimate, the community's population presumably decreased by 19.8%. Later in a 2013 estimate, it was presumed that the population was now approximately 10. Between 2005 and 2013, the community's population decreased by 88.7%.

Overall, the population of Essex presumably decreased by 90.9%. The town is presumably on its way to abandonment.

== In popular culture ==
- In the episode called "The Town" in the second season of the original Mission: Impossible television series, a car carrying two would-be assassins is shown pulling out of a gas station in Essex onto old US 66.
- As described above, season 20, episode 1 of The Tonight Show Starring Johnny Carson was filmed in Essex.

== See also ==
- Camp Essex, a World War II training camp near by.
