= Camp Ibis =

California Historic Landmark

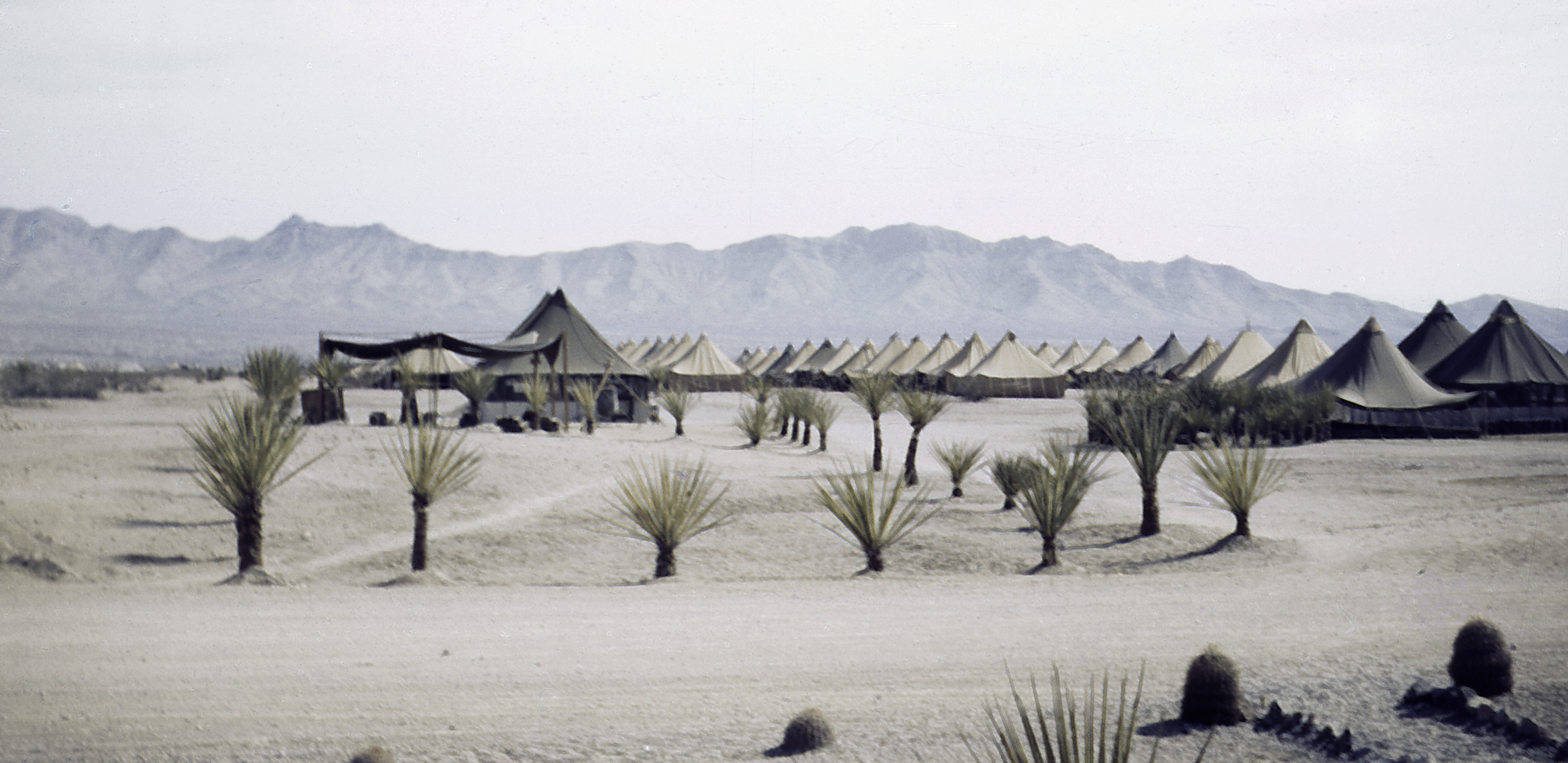
- Camp Ibis in 1943

- Location within California
- 34°58′10″N 114°49′59″W
- Location: near Needles, California

History
- Built: 1942

Site notes
- Architect: US Army

California Historical Landmark
- Designated: May 1, 1987
- Reference no.: 985.5

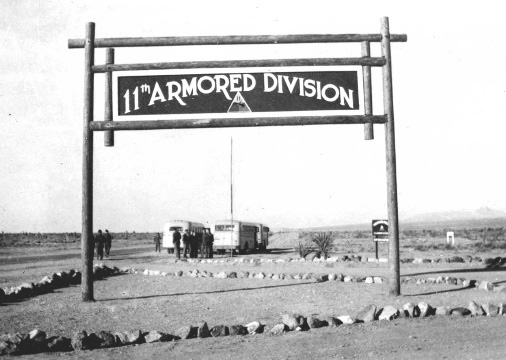
Camp Ibis, entrance in winter of 1943

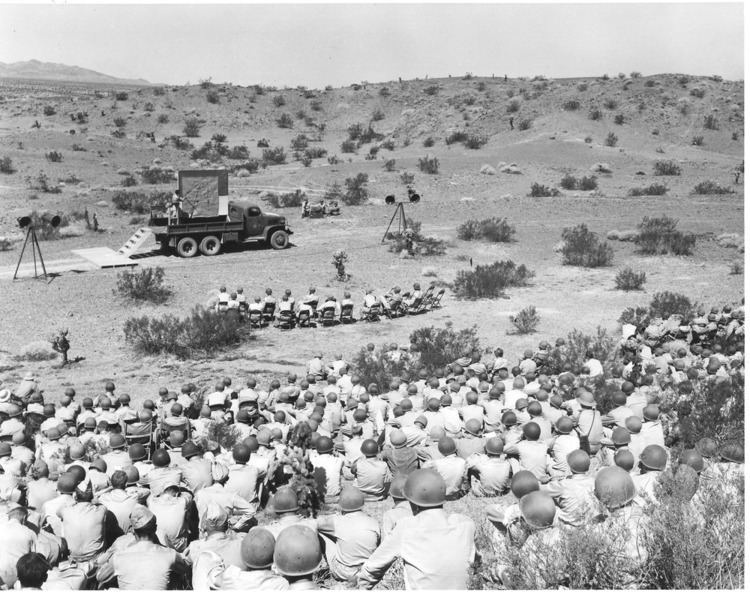
Desert Training Center 1943

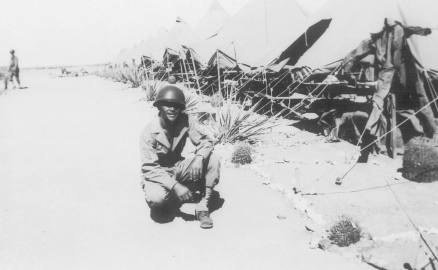
Camp Ibis in 1943

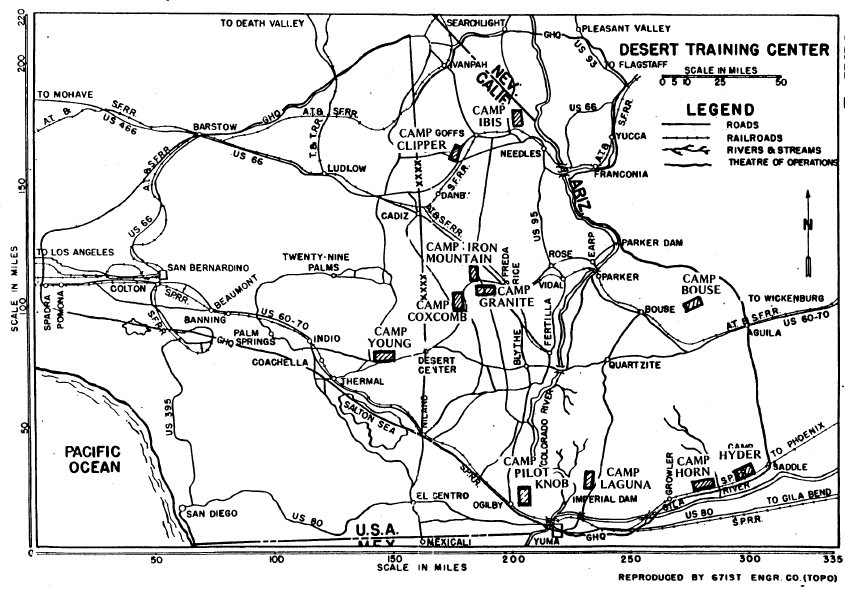
Map of Desert training center with Camp Granite

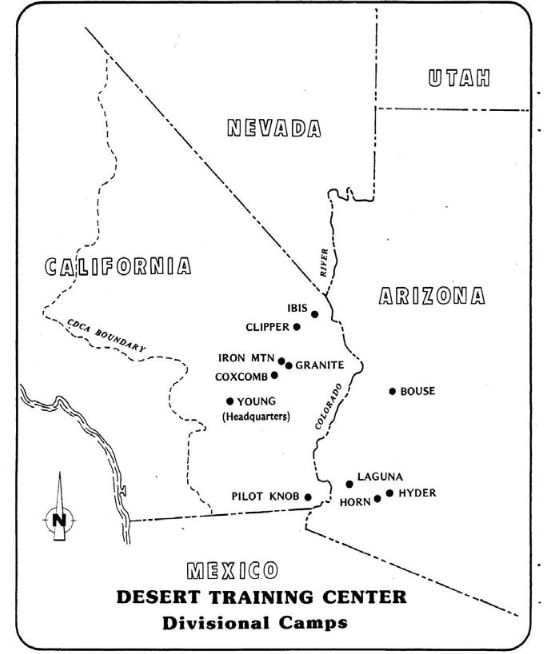
Desert Training Center map US Army 1943

Camp Ibis was one of twelve divisional tent camps of the US Army Desert Training Center (DTC) which was established in early 1942 during World War II, originally to advance desert tank warfare and to train troops for desert combat. The DTC was located in the Mojave Desert and Sonoran Desert, largely in Southern California and Western Arizona. In October 1943, the DTC was redesignated as the California-Arizona Maneuver Area (C-AMA). The headquarters for the Desert Training Center was Camp Young where General Patton's 3rd Armored Division was stationed. Camp Ibis was designated a California Historic Landmark (No. 985.6). The site of the Camp Ibis 8 miles (13 km) East of Needles, California off Highway 95, north of Interstate 40 in San Bernardino County, California. The camp was originally named after the Ibis railroad siding in Piute Valley. The camp was located at the west side of the Dead Mountains Wilderness.

Camp Ibis was constructed between November 8, 1942, and March 28, 1943, to help support troops training to fight in the North Africa campaign during the war. Major units trained at Camp Ibis included the 4th Armored Division (under MG John Shirley Wood) from November to June 1943, followed by the 9th U.S. Armored Division (under MG John W. Leonard) from July to October, 1943. When completed the camp had 42 shower buildings, 173 latrines, 234 wooden tent frames, and a 50,000-gallon water tank tower. Camp Ibis had 24 training ranges. It closed on 16 March 1944. The army used live-fire exercises and warning signs are still on the site.

== Notable units trained at Camp Ibis ==
Three US Army armored divisions trained at Camp Ibis:

- 4th Armored Division, November–June, 1943
- 9th Armored Division, July–October, 1943
- 11th Armored Division, October–March, 1944

== Camp Ibis Airfield ==
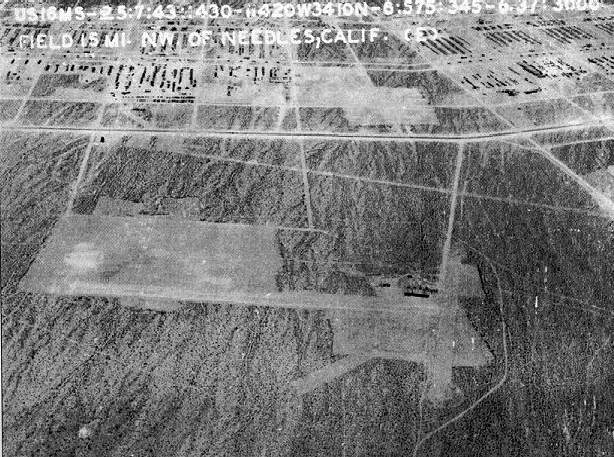
Camp Ibis and Camp Ibis Airfield in 1943

Patton established five major airfields with landing strips near each camp to bring in supplies. Camp Ibis Airfield was an air strip located on the west side of Camp Ibis to support training activities there. Its 4,500 foot runway was made of steel landing mats running north–south, parallel to Highway 95 on its west side. Small planes were used to watch the desert survival training, gunnery practices, and tank tactics training. Aircraft were also used to coordinate tanks and other armored vehicles from the air.

== Historical marker ==
A California Historical Landmark sign on Highway 95 at the site reads:

NO. 985 DESERT TRAINING CENTER, CALIFORNIA–ARIZONA MANEUVER AREA (ESTABLISHED BY MAJOR GENERAL GEORGE S. PATTON, JR.) – CAMP IBIS – Camp Ibis was established at this site in the Spring of 1942 – one of eleven such camps built in the California–Arizona Desert to harden and train United States Troops for service on the battlefields of World War II. The 440th AAA AW Battalion was activated per General Order No. 1 at Camp Haan, CA on July 1, 1942. It trained at Camp M.A.A.R. (Irwin), Camps Young, Iron Mountain, Ibis, and then Camps Pickett, VA and Steward, GA. The battalion shipped out to England in December 1943 and landed in Normandy on D-3. The unit earned 5 Battle Stars and 2 Foreign Awards while serving with the 1st, 3rd, 7th, and 9th U.S. Armies, the 1st French Army and the 2nd British Army, 7 different corps and 5 different divisions. The 440th AAA AW BN was deactivated in December 1944.

== See also ==
- California during World War II
- California Historical Landmarks in Riverside County, California
- California Historical Landmarks in San Bernardino County, California
- Camp Clipper
- Camp Coxcomb
- Camp Essex
- Camp Granite
- Camp Iron Mountain
