= Camp Coxcomb =

California Historic Landmark

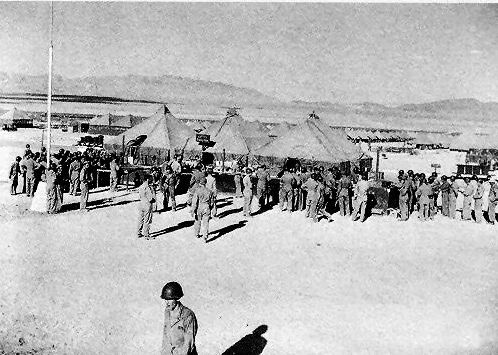
- Camp Coxcomb PX Meal in 1943

- Location within California
- 33°54′30″N 115°14′53″W
- Location: near Desert Center, California

History
- Built: 1943

Site notes
- Architect: US Army

California Historical Landmark
- Reference no.: 985.3

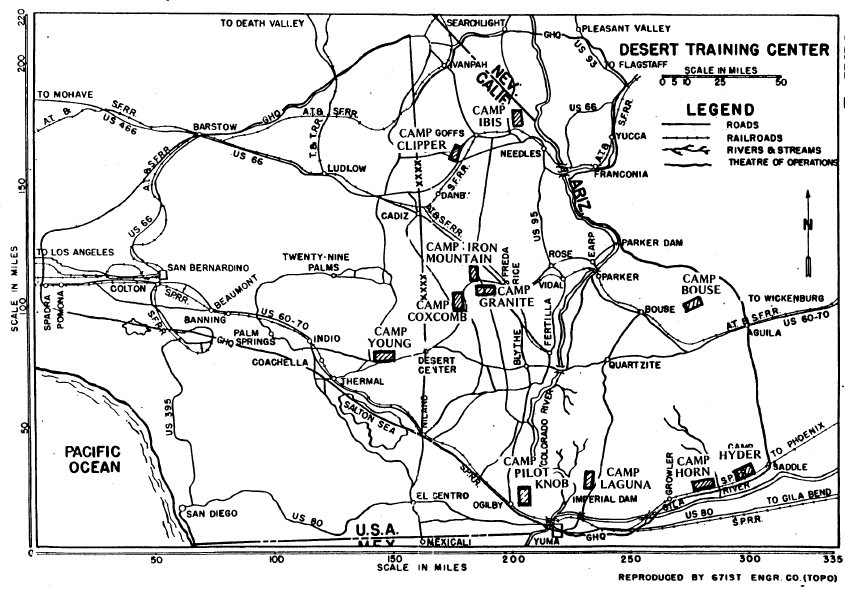
Map of Desert training center with Camp Coxcomb

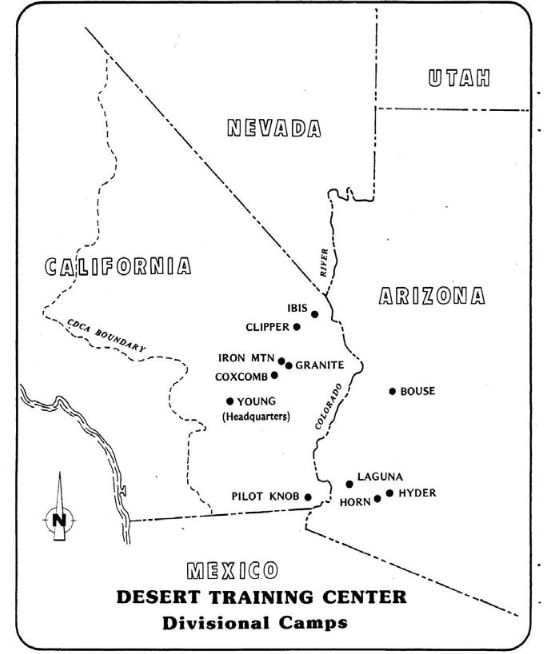
Desert Training Center map US Army 1943

The Camp Coxcomb was a sub camp of the US Army Desert Training Center in Riverside County, California. The main headquarters for the Desert Training Center was Camp Young where General Patton's 3rd Armored Division was stationed. Camp Coxcomb was designated a California Historic Landmark (No.985). The site of the Camp Granite is 45 miles East of Indio, California off Interstate 10 and California State Route 177 near the Coxcomb Mountains. The train stop at Freda railroad siding delivered Troops and equipment. The camp closed in early in 1944 after about two years of operations.

Built in the spring of 1942, Camp Coxcomb was built to prepare troops to do battle in North Africa to fight the Nazis during World War II. Stationed at Camp Coxcomb was the 7th Armored Division and the 85th Infantry Division. Also trained at the camp was the 93rd Infantry Division and the 95th Infantry Division. The trained troops went on to fight in the North African campaign.

When completed the camp had 39 shower buildings, 165 latrines, 284 wooden tent frames, observation/flag tower and a 40,000-gallon water tank. The camp had seven ranges for machine gun and small firearms. The trained troops went on to fight in the North African campaign. Near the camp was the Palen Pass Maneuver Area. Built at the Palen Pass was defensive fortifications for training.

== Camp Coxcomb Army Field ==
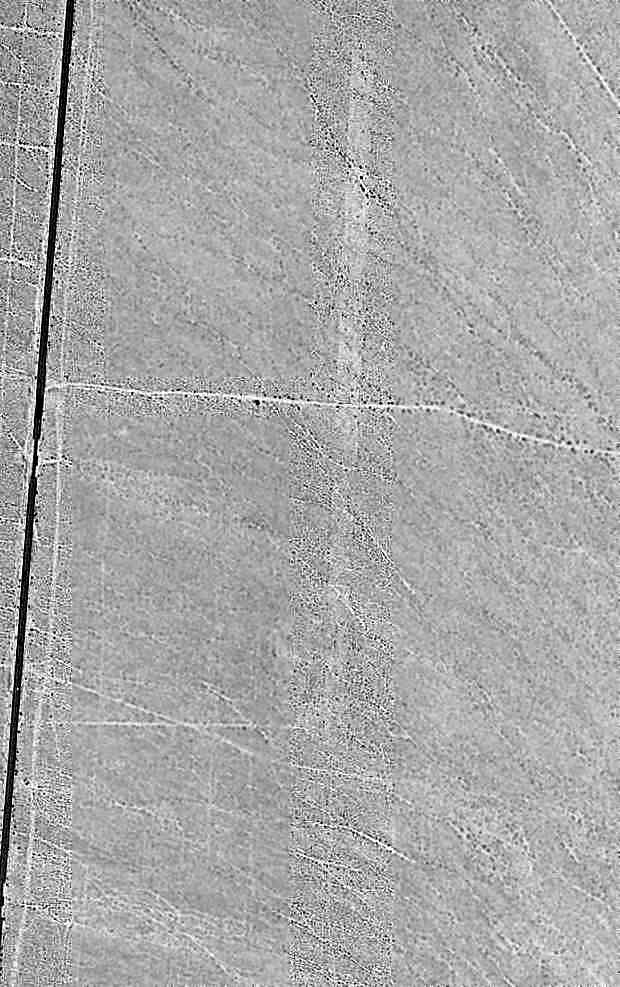
Camp Coxcomb Army Field Airfield in 1995, with California State Route 177 on the right

Camp Coxcomb Army Field was an air strip near the Camp Coxcomb to support training activities. The runway ran north–south and was 4,500 feet long made of steel landing mats. The landing strip is on the east side of California State Route 177. Small planes were used to watch the desert survival training, gunnery practices, and tank tactics training. Also aircraft were used to coordinate tanks and other armored vehicles from the air. For a short time in 1951 the Coxcomb airfield was used as a private landing strip.

== Camp Freda Quartermaster Depot ==
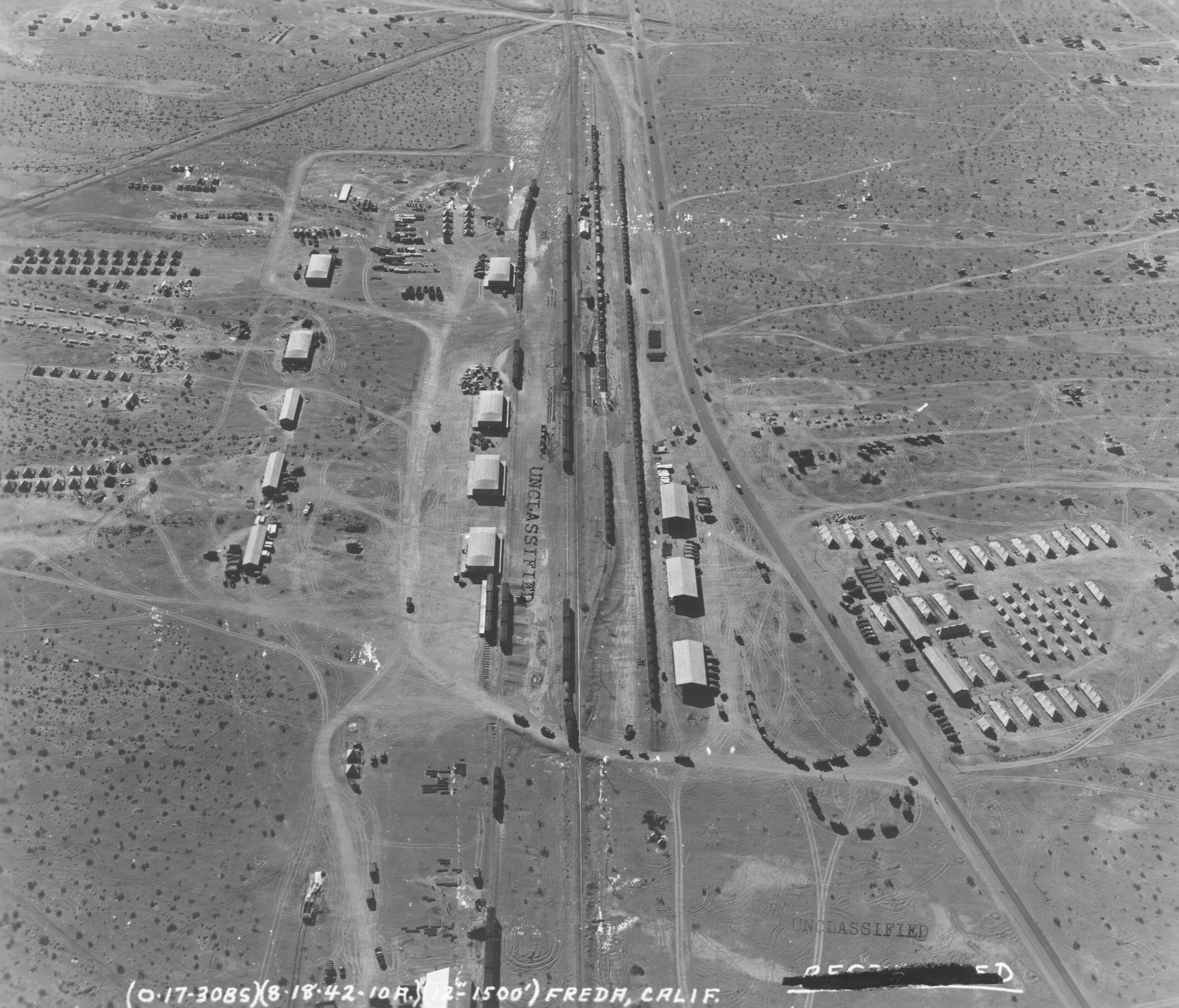
Camp Freda, 1942

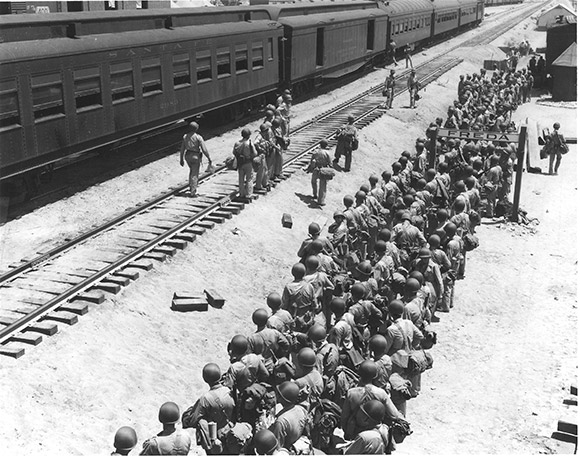
Soldiers at Camp Freda railroad siding

Near the Camp Coxcomb was an old Santa Fe Railroad station that was turned into the Camp Freda Quartermaster Depot also called Camp Freda. This was near the small town of Freda, California. The US Army turned the small rail station into a major US Army quartermaster depot to support Camp Coxcomb and the other near by Desert Training Center camps. All the troop to be trained at Camp Coxcomb arrived at the rail depot. The depot was stocked with tanks, military vehicles, artillery guns, gas, food, tents, and ammo. Also to support the thousands of troop in the area was field hospital. The 92nd evacuation hospital medical unit was stationed at the Camp Freda Quartermaster Depot before being transferred to the Camp Desert Center Evacuation hospital. Camp Freda was staffed by the 92nd Evacuation Hospital unit, 211th Quartermaster Gas Supply Battalion, 484th Quartermaster Battalion, and 378th Engineer Battalion. Camp Freda closed April 1944; Camp Freda now an unpopulated railroad siding with a few remnants of US Army built rock-lined walkways, roads and a few concrete foundations.

== Marker ==
Marker on the Riverside, California site reads:

- NO. 985 DESERT TRAINING CENTER, CALIFORNIA–ARIZONA MANEUVER AREA (ESTABLISHED BY MAJOR GENERAL GEORGE S. PATTON, JR.) – CAMP COXCOMB – Camp Coxcomb was established at this site in the Spring of 1942. It was one of twelve such camps built in the southwestern desert to harden and train United States troops for service on the battlefields of World War II. The Desert Training Center was a simulated theater of operations that included portions of California, Arizona and Nevada. The other camps were Young, Granite, Iron Mountain, Ibis, Clipper, Pilot Knob, Laguna, Horn, Hyder, Bouse and Rice. A total of 13 infantry divisions and 7 armored divisions plus numerous smaller units were trained in this harsh environment. The Training Center was in operation for almost 2 years and was closed early in 1944 when the last units were shipped overseas. During the brief period of operation over one million American soldiers were trained for combat.

Marker on site:

- Camp Coxcomb was established at this site in the Spring of 1942. It was one of fifteen such camps built in the southwestern deserts to harden and train United States troops for service on the battlefields of World War II. The Desert Training Center was a simulated theater of operations that included portions of California, Arizona and Nevada. The other camps were Young, Granite, Iron Mountain, Ibis, Clipper, Pilot Knob, Laguna, Horn, Hyder, Bouse and Rice. A total of thirteen infantry divisions and seven armored divisions plus numerous smaller units were trained in this harsh environment. The training center was in operation for almost 2 years and was closed early in 1944 when the last units were shipped overseas. During the brief period of operation over one million American soldiers were trained for combat. The Sixth Armored Division was declared a liberating unit by the US Army's Center of Military History and the United States Holocaust Memorial Museum for the liberation of the Buchenwald concentration camp on April 11, 1945. This monument is dedicated to all the soldiers that served here and especially for those who gave their lives in battle, ending the Holocaust and defeating the armed forces of Nazi Germany, Fascist Italy and Imperial Japan. Plaque placed by the Billy Holcomb Chapter 1069 of the Ancient and Honorable Order of E Clampus Vitus and the Veterans of the 6th Armored Division, the 7th Armored Division Associations, in cooperation with the Bureau of Land Management, Needles Resource Area. November 11, 1989, Re-dedicated March 14, 2014. Erected 1989 by The Billy Holcomb Chapter of the Ancient & Honorable Order of E Clampus Vitus, the Veterans of the 6th Armored Division, the 7th Armored Division Association and in cooperation with The Bureau of Land Management, Needles Resource Area. (Marker Number 148.)

== See also ==
- California Historical Landmarks in San Bernardino County, California
- California Historical Landmarks in Riverside County, California
- Camp Granite
- Camp Iron Mountain
- Camp Clipper and Camp Essex
- Camp Ibis
- California during World War II
