= Camp Clipper =

Former US Army camp in Mojave Desert, California

Camp Clipper and Camp Essex
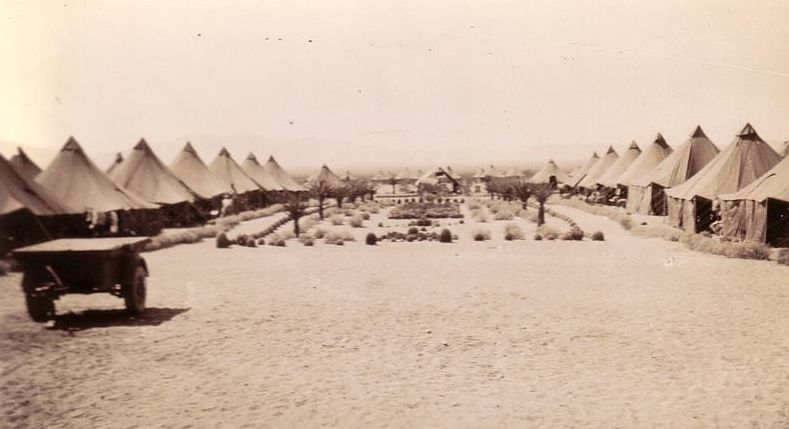
- Camp Clipper in June 1943, 108th ECB street

- Location within California
- 34°47′55″N 115°16′04″W
- Location: near Essex, California

History
- Built: 1942

Site notes
- Area: 21,537.78 acres (8,716.03 ha)
- Architect: US Army

California Historical Landmark
- Reference no.: 985.5

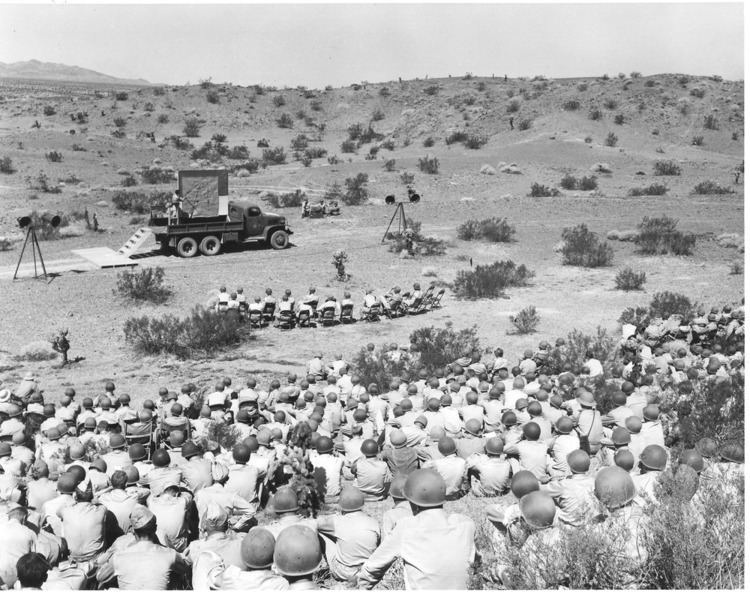
Desert Training Center 1943

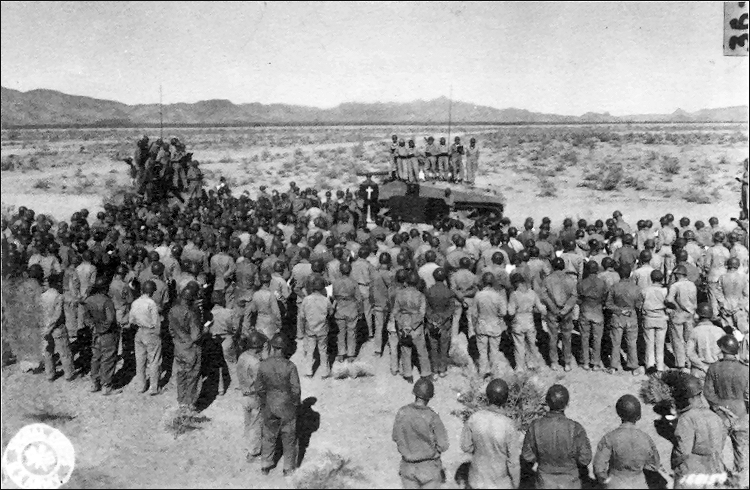
Camp Essex Service in 1943

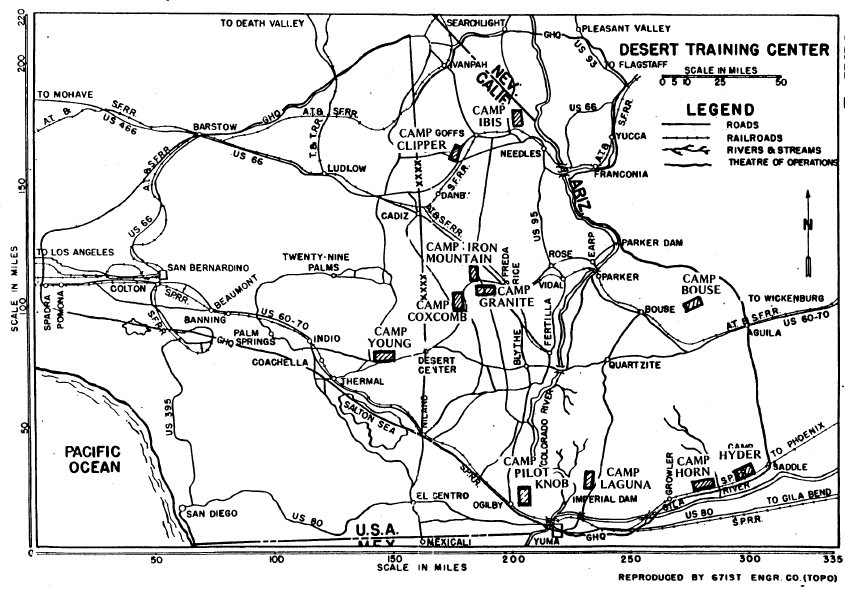
Map of Desert training center camps

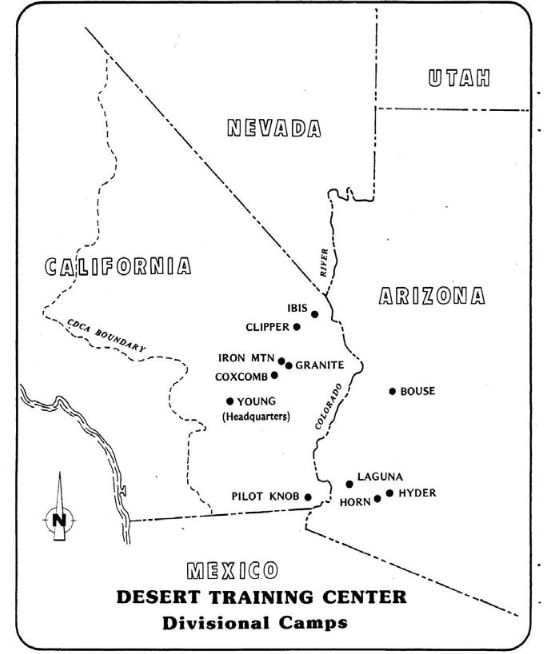
Desert Training Center map US Army 1943

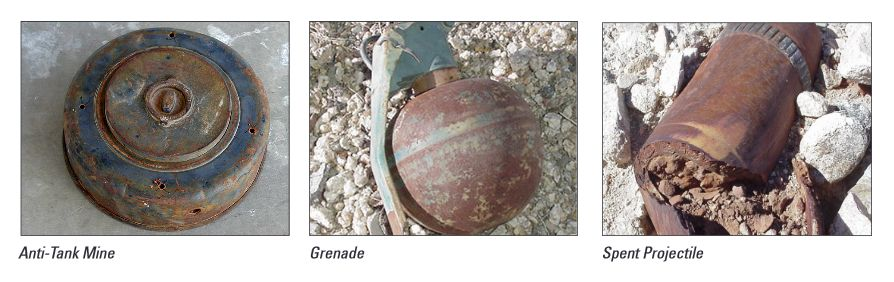
US Army live fire exercises remains at Desert Training Center

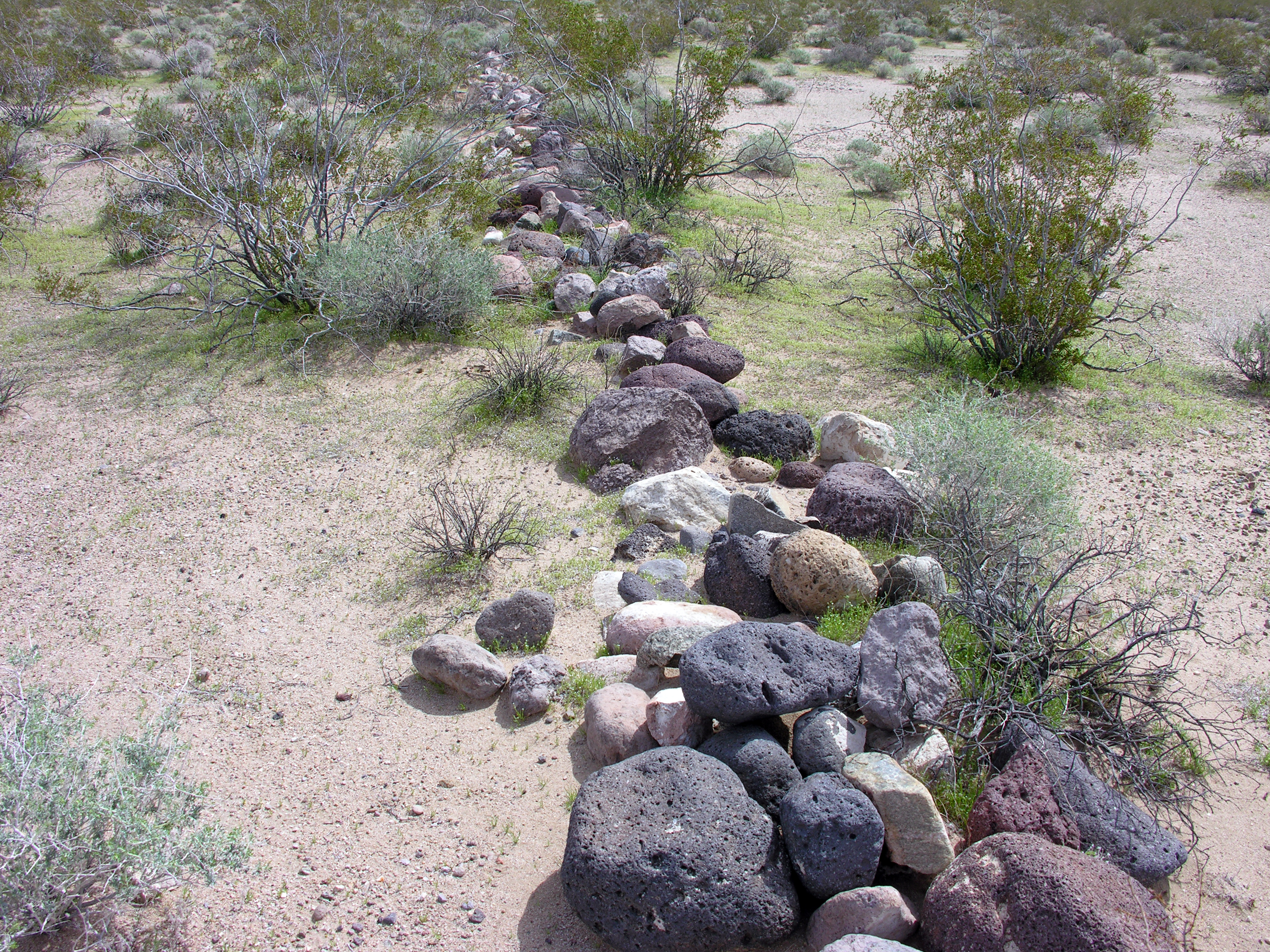
Camp Clipper Army barracks rock boundary in 2010, Mojave Desert, California

Camp Clipper and Camp Essex were subcamps of the US Army's Desert Training Center in San Bernardino County, California, located near Historic Route 66 and the Santa Fe Railway. The main headquarters for the Desert Training Center was Camp Young. This is where General George S. Patton's 3rd Armored Division was stationed. Camp Clipper was designated a California Historic Landmark (No.985.5). The site of Camp Essex is located near the Fenner Rest Area in Fenner, California, on Interstate 40 and Route 66, 32 miles (51 km) west of Needles in San Bernardino County, California, near the town of Essex. Currently at the south end of the Mojave National Preserve. Camp Clipper was just to the west of Camp Essex. Camp Essex was a temporary camp for incoming and outgoing troops. Camp Essex was named after a small town near the camp, Essex. Camp Clipper was named for its proximity to the Clipper Mountains. Between Camp Essex and Route 66 was the 4,500 foot Camp Essex Army Airfield.

Built in 1942, Camp Clipper and Camp Essex were built to prepare troops to do battle in North Africa to fight the Nazis during World War II. At Camp Clipper were trained the 93rd Infantry Division. The trained troops went on to fight in the North African campaign. Camp Essex was a temporary (transitional) camp built for the handling of incoming/departing troops. When completed, Camp Clipper had 36 shower buildings, an outdoor theater, 191 latrines, 149 wooden tent frames, and a 50,000-gallon water tank. Also built was a 500,000 gallon concrete reservoir and two 740-foot-deep wells. Camp Clipper had 14 training ranges. The camp was used shortly in 1944 for Italian prisoners of war. The camp closed on 16 March 1944 and is now overseen by the Bureau of Land Management. The army used live-fire exercises and warning signs are still on the site.

Operating Camp Clipper:

- 16th Special Service Company (AGF)
- 2nd Service Platoon
- 605th Engineer Camouflage Battalion (AGF)
- Company C
  - Trained at the camp: 33rd infantry Division from April 1943 to July 1943* 356th Engineer General Service Regiment (AGF)
  - Trained at the camp: 93rd Infantry Division from July 1943 to October 1943
- Company A
- Company E

== Camp Essex Army Airfield ==
There was an air strip near Camp Essex to support training activities. The runway was two 4,500 feet long runs made of steel landing mats with 6 parking pads at each end of the runway. The runway ran north-south, parallel to the old U.S. Route 66. The runway was long enough for large planes to use in training exercises: (Per "Travel Information Desert Training Center" 8/4/43, these are the "Types of planes necessitating runways of 4000 ft (S.L.) minimum) A-20, A-24, A-35, 0-52, P-39, P-45, UC-78, RDB-7B, C-45, C-47, BT-15, O-61 AND BC-1). In early 1950 the airfield was used as a private airfield, being not maintained it was abandoned in the late 1950s.

== Marker ==
Marker at the Eastbound Rest Stop in California reads:

- NO. 985 DESERT TRAINING CENTER, CALIFORNIA–ARIZONA MANEUVER AREA (ESTABLISHED BY MAJOR GENERAL GEORGE S. PATTON, JR.) – CAMP CLIPPER – Camp Clipper was established at a site that reached from Essex Road to this location in the Spring of 1942. It was one of twelve such camps built in the southwestern deserts to harden and train United States troops for service on the battlefields of World War II. The Desert Training Center was a simulated theater of operations that included portions of California, Arizona, and Nevada. The other camps were Young, Coxcomb, Iron Mountain, Ibis, Granite, Pilot Knob, Laguna, Horn, Ryder, Bouse and Rice. A total of 13 infantry divisions and 7 armored divisions plus numerous smaller units were trained in this harsh environment. The Training Center was in operation for almost two years and was closed early in 1944 when the last units were shipped overseas. During the brief period of operation over one million American soldiers were trained for combat. The 33rd and 93rd Infantry Divisions were trained here.

== See also ==
- California Historical Landmarks in San Bernardino County, California
- California Historical Landmarks in Riverside County, California
- Camp Coxcomb
- Camp Granite
- Camp Iron Mountain
- Camp Ibis
- California during World War II
