= Camp Granite =

California Historic Landmark

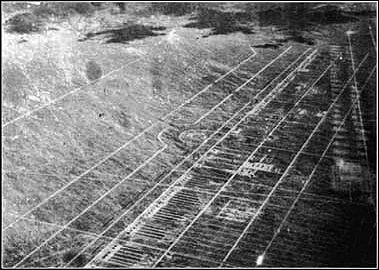
- Camp Granite in 1943

- Location within California
- 34°04′50″N 115°08′00″W
- Location: near Indio, California

History
- Built: 1943

Site notes
- Architect: US Army

California Historical Landmark
- Reference no.: 985.2

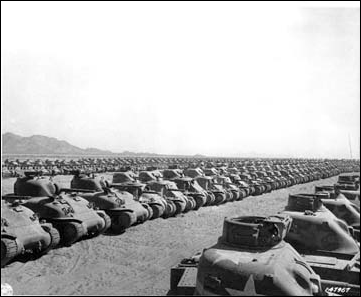
M-4 Tanks at Camp Granite in 1943

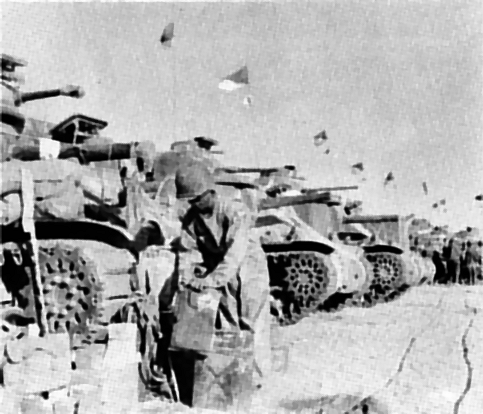
Filling up Tanks at Camp Granite in 1943

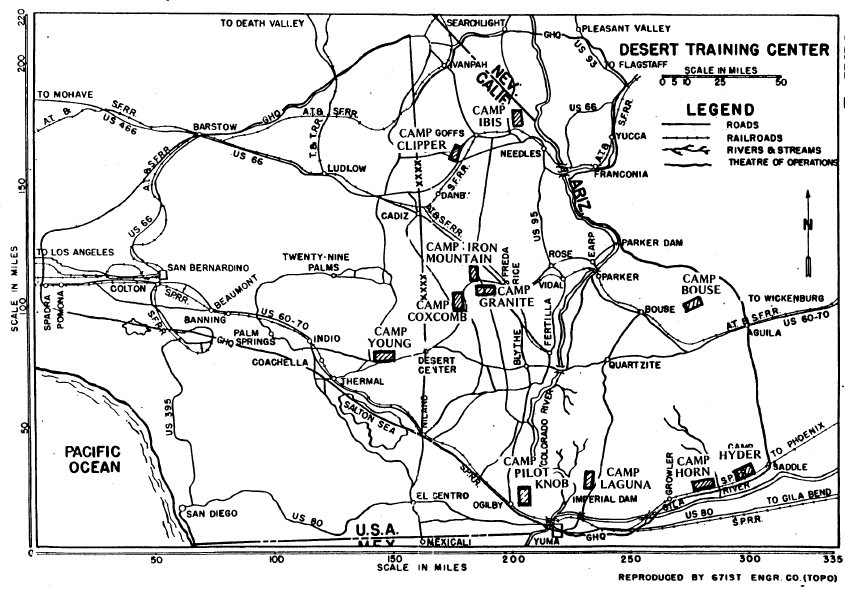
Map of Desert training center with Camp Granite

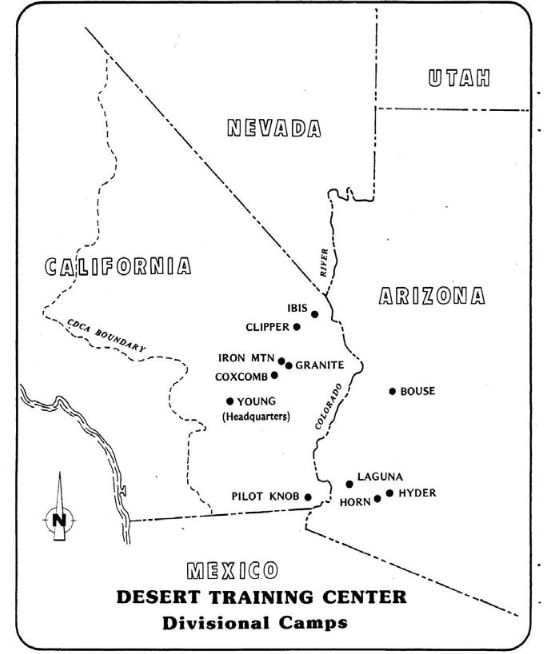
Desert Training Center map US Army 1943

The Camp Granite was a sub camp of the US Army Desert Training Center in Riverside County, California. The main headquarters for the Desert Training Center was Camp Young. General Patton's 3rd Armored Division was stationed here. Camp Granite was designated a California Historic Landmark (No.985.2). The site of the Camp Granite is 45 miles East of Indio, California off Interstate 10 and California State Route 62 near the Granite Mountains.

Built in the spring of 1943, Camp Granite was built to prepare troops to do battle in North Africa to fight the Nazis during World War II. The original camp had to quickly be moved to higher ground due to flooding. At Camp Granite were stationed the 90th Infantry Division and 104th Infantry Divisions. Among the smaller units known to have been stationed at Camp Granite were the 76th Field Artillery Regiment and the 413th Infantry Regiment. XV Corps (United States) used Camp Granite as their headquarters from July- 1943 to November 1943. When completed, the camp had 40 shower buildings, 157 latrines, 191 wooden tent frames, and a 50,000-gallon water tank.

The camp had an artillery range and small firearms range. Targets were towed behind planes for the .30-caliber antiaircraft and .50-caliber antiaircraft guns. There were also ranges for M101 howitzer and 57 mm guns. The trained troops went on to fight in the North African campaign.

The army used live-fire exercises and warning signs are still on the site.

The camp used the nearby US Army Camp Iron Mountain Airfield for air support.

== Palen Pass ==
Palen Pass in the Palen Mountains was the site of major maneuvers. The pass was both used as a place for troop to build defenses and as target for artillery training. Lockheed P-38 Lightnings bombed and attacked ground targets in the pass on August 20, 1943.

== Marker ==
Marker on the Riverside, California site reads:

- NO. 985 DESERT TRAINING CENTER, CALIFORNIA–ARIZONA MANEUVER AREA (ESTABLISHED BY MAJOR GENERAL GEORGE S. PATTON, JR.) – CAMP GRANITE – Camp Granite was established at this site in the Spring of 1942. It was one of twelve such camps built in the southwestern desert to harden and train United States troops for service on the battlefields of World War II. The Desert Training Center was a simulated theater of operations that included portions of California, Arizona and Nevada. The other camps were Young, Granite, Iron Mountain, Ibis, Clipper, Pilot Knob, Laguna, Horn, Hyder, Bouse and Rice. A total of 13 infantry divisions and 7 armored divisions plus numerous smaller units were trained in this harsh environment. The Training Center was in operation for almost 2 years and was closed early in 1944 when the last units were shipped overseas. During the brief period of operation over one million American soldiers were trained for combat.

== See also ==
- California Historical Landmarks in Riverside County, California
- Camp Coxcomb
- Camp Clipper
- Camp Iron Mountain
- Camp Clipper and Camp Essex
- Camp Ibis
- California during World War II
