= Camp Iron Mountain =

California Historic Landmark

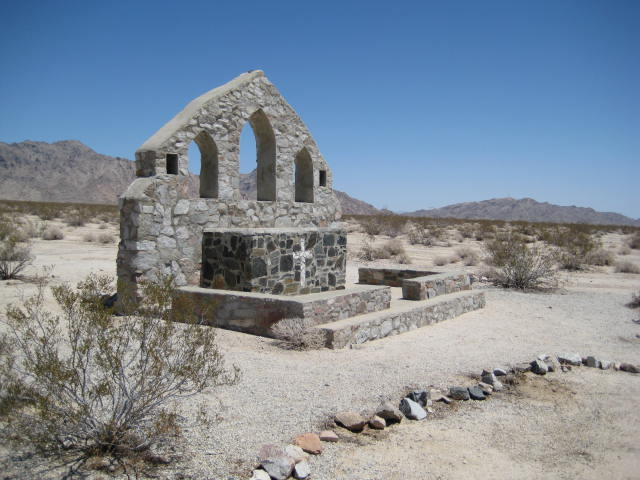
- Catholic Chapel at Camp Iron Mountain

- Location within California
- 34°06′04″N 115°09′32″W
- Location: near Needles, California

History
- Built: 1942

Site notes
- Area: 67,907.504 acres (27,481.192 ha)
- Architect: US Army

California Historical Landmark
- Reference no.: 985.4

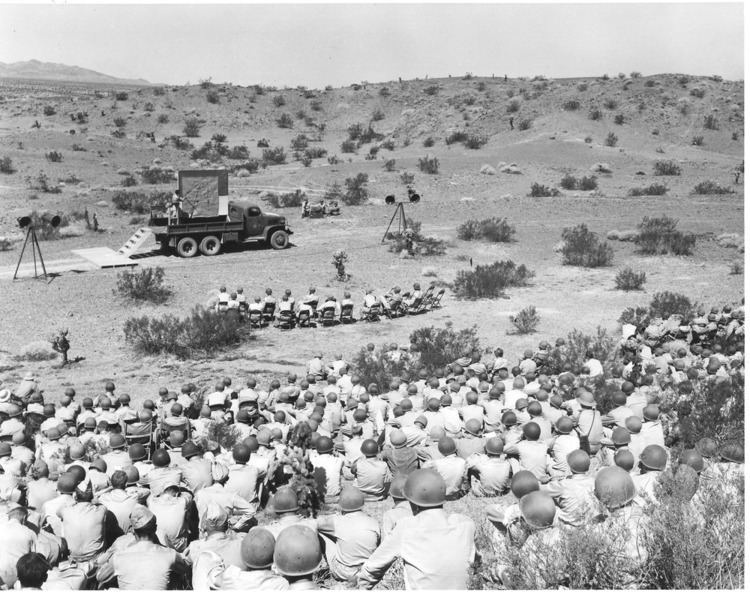
Desert Training Center 1943

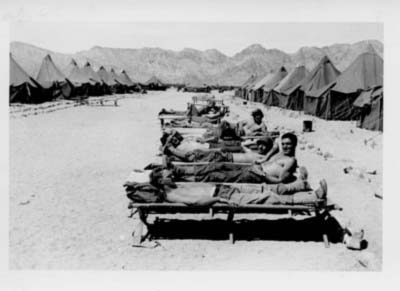
80th Infantry Division resting after extended desert maneuvers at Camp Iron Mountain in 1943

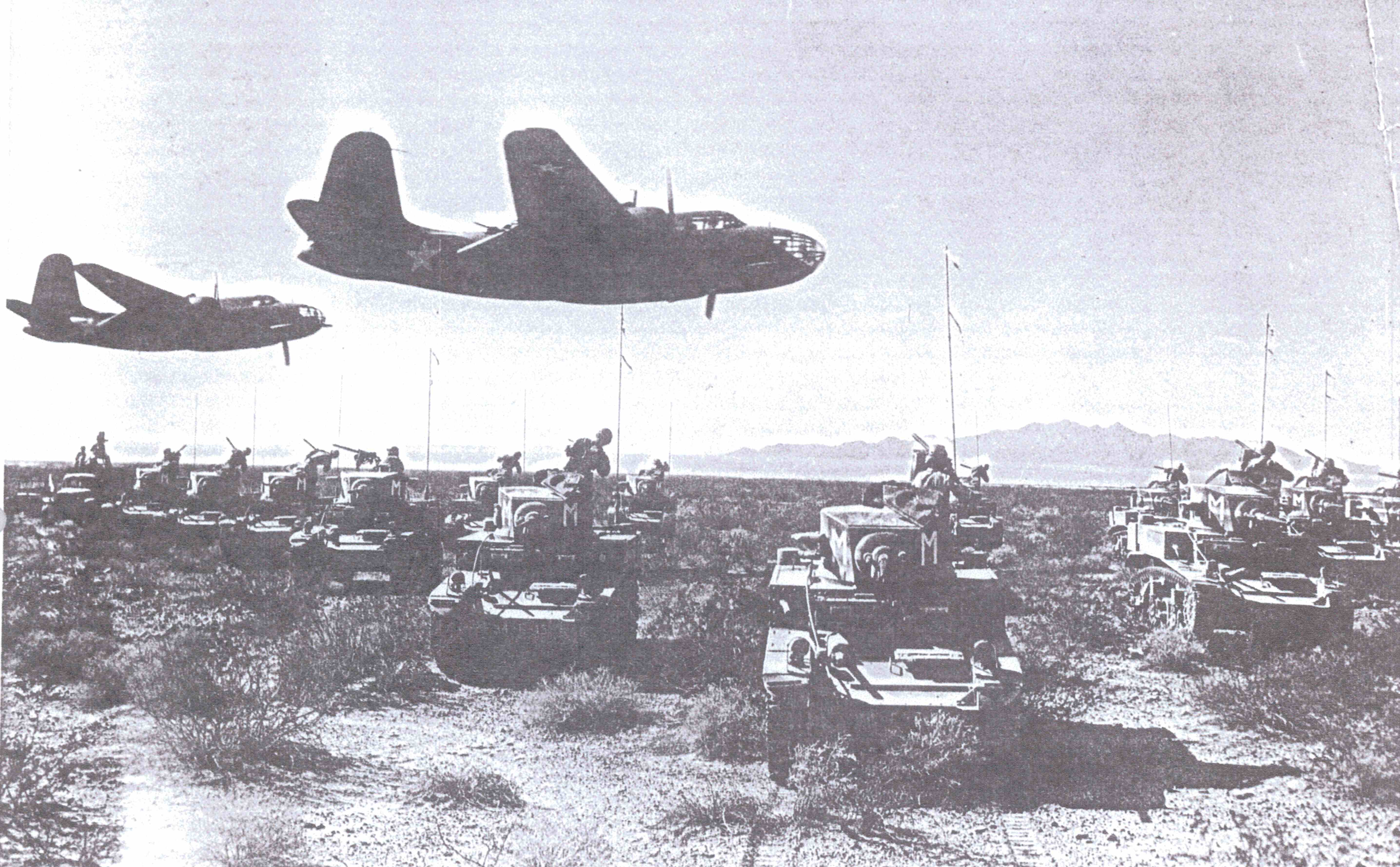
Training at Camp Iron Mountain, 1942

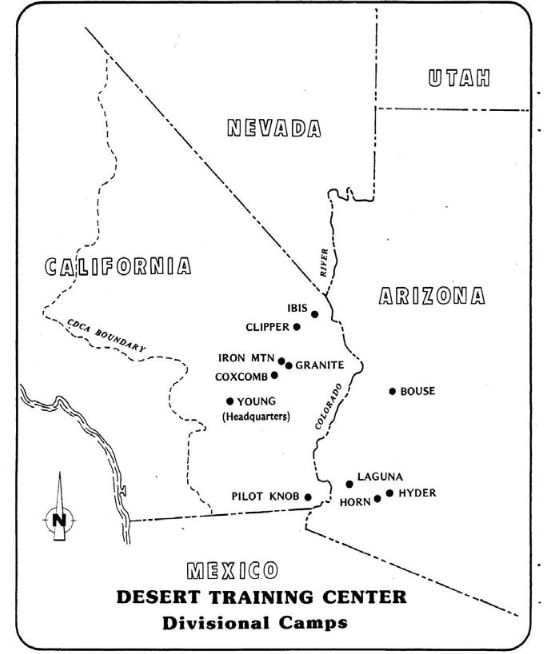
Desert Training Center map US Army 1943

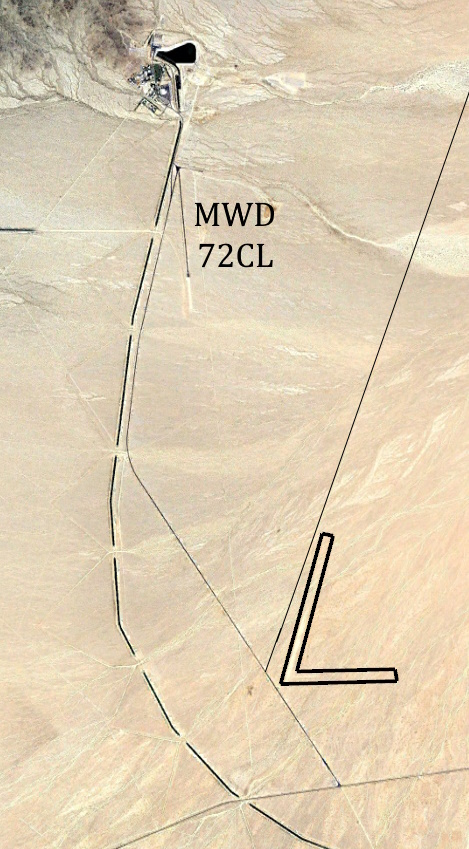
Image showing both the MWD Iron Mtn Pumping Plant landing strip and the WWII Camp Iron Mtn landing strip (outlined) which is still visible.

The Camp Iron Mountain was a sub camp of the US Army Desert Training Center in Riverside County, California. The main headquarters for the Desert Training Center was Camp Young; this is where General Patton's 3rd Armored Division was stationed. Camp Iron Mountain was designated a California Historic Landmark (No.985.6). Camp Iron Mountain is near the site of Camp Granite, both are 45 miles (72 km) miles East of Indio, California off Interstate 10 and California State Route 62 near the Granite Mountains in San Bernardino County, California. In 1980 Camp Iron Mountain received the listing as an Area of Critical Environmental Concern from the Bureau of Land Management. The listing was given as Camp Iron Mountain is the best preserved of the Desert Training Center Camps. The Bureau of Land Management put up fences to protect the camp from Off-road vehicle traffic. Still at the camp today are a 200 x 175 foot contour training map, some rock mosaics, two church altars, rock lined roads and walkways. The camp is named after the near by Iron Mountains.

Camp Iron Mountain was built in April 1942, to prepare troops to do battle in North Africa to fight the Nazis during World War II. At Camp Iron Mountain were stationed the 2nd Armored Division under General George S. Patton and the 80th Division. The trained troops went on to fight in the North African campaign. When completed the camp had 15 shower buildings, 26 latrines, 113 wooden tent frames, an amphitheater, a 4,000-gallon water tank tower and two 3,000 gallon water tank towers. Camp had 6 training ranges for rifle, handguns and machine guns. The camp closed on 16 March 1944. The army used live-fire exercises and warning signs are still on the site. The most preserved items at the camp are two stone outdoor chapel altars. One was built for Catholic church services and one for Protestant church service.

== Camp Iron Mountain Landing Strip ==
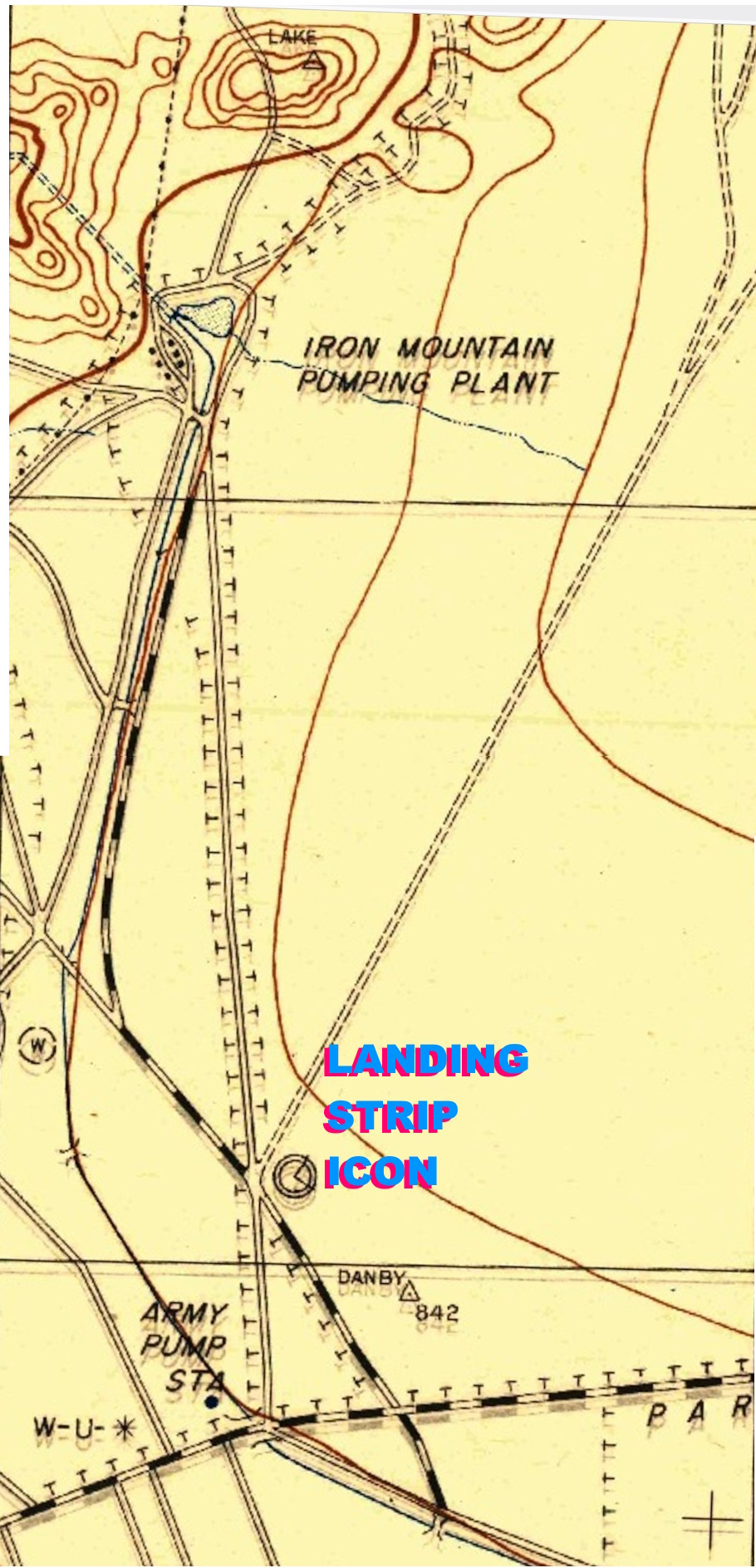
Location of the Camp Iron Mtn landing strip

Camp Iron Mountain landing strip was built near the Camp Iron Mountain to support the training activities. The runway was 4,500 feet long made of steel landing mats. Small planes were used to watch the desert survival training, gunnery practices, and tank tactics training. Also aircraft were used to coordinate tanks and other armored vehicles from the air.

Many think that the landing strip at the MWD Iron Mtn Pumping Plant (72CL) is the old Camp Iron Mtn runway, but this is false. A 1944 Army map shows the landing strip to be about 2.5 mi south of the current MWD landing strip. In addition, a September 4, 1963 (page 4) report to the MWD Board of Directors regarding district construction states "Airplane landing strips at Iron Mountain were completed".

== California Historical Landmark Marker ==
Marker on the Riverside, California site reads:

- NO. 985 DESERT TRAINING CENTER, CALIFORNIA–ARIZONA MANEUVER AREA (ESTABLISHED BY MAJOR GENERAL GEORGE S. PATTON, JR.) – CAMP IRON MOUNTAIN – Iron Mountain Divisional Camp was established at this site in the Spring of 1942. One of eleven such camps built in the California-Arizona Desert to harden and train United States troops for service on the battlefields of World War II. The first major unit trained here was the 3rd Armored Division followed by elements of the 4th, 5th, 6th, and 7th Armored Divisions. In all, one million men trained in the desert before the Training Center was officially closed in May 1944. The most unique feature built at this camp is the huge relief map built into the desert floor. It can still be seen (1985).

== Climate ==
Climate data for Iron Mountain, California, 1991–2020 normals, extremes 1935–present
Month	Jan	Feb	Mar	Apr	May	Jun	Jul	Aug	Sep	Oct	Nov	Dec	Year
Record high °F (°C)	85 (29)	93 (34)	108 (42)	107 (42)	114 (46)	127 (53)	122 (50)	121 (49)	120 (49)	112 (44)	94 (34)	85 (29)	127 (53)
Mean maximum °F (°C)	80.6 (27.0)	83.9 (28.8)	92.1 (33.4)	99.7 (37.6)	105.6 (40.9)	114.2 (45.7)	116.4 (46.9)	114.6 (45.9)	110.9 (43.8)	101.3 (38.5)	87.0 (30.6)	75.9 (24.4)	117.1 (47.3)
Mean daily maximum °F (°C)	65.0 (18.3)	70.2 (21.2)	76.5 (24.7)	84.9 (29.4)	93.8 (34.3)	103.4 (39.7)	108.4 (42.4)	106.8 (41.6)	101.0 (38.3)	89.0 (31.7)	74.7 (23.7)	64.5 (18.1)	86.7 (30.4)
Daily mean °F (°C)	56.0 (13.3)	59.4 (15.2)	65.0 (18.3)	70.4 (21.3)	77.8 (25.4)	85.4 (29.7)	90.9 (32.7)	91.4 (33.0)	86.6 (30.3)	75.2 (24.0)	63.2 (17.3)	54.9 (12.7)	73.0 (22.8)
Mean daily minimum °F (°C)	43.3 (6.3)	46.6 (8.1)	51.5 (10.8)	56.4 (13.6)	63.0 (17.2)	70.0 (21.1)	77.3 (25.2)	78.4 (25.8)	73.2 (22.9)	61.4 (16.3)	49.8 (9.9)	42.3 (5.7)	59.4 (15.2)
Mean minimum °F (°C)	33.4 (0.8)	36.6 (2.6)	41.3 (5.2)	46.7 (8.2)	53.7 (12.1)	60.1 (15.6)	68.1 (20.1)	69.0 (20.6)	62.2 (16.8)	50.0 (10.0)	39.0 (3.9)	32.2 (0.1)	31.0 (−0.6)
Record low °F (°C)	21 (−6)	24 (−4)	30 (−1)	33 (1)	37 (3)	51 (11)	60 (16)	60 (16)	50 (10)	33 (1)	28 (−2)	22 (−6)	21 (−6)
Average precipitation inches (mm)	0.47 (12)	0.43 (11)	0.31 (7.9)	0.09 (2.3)	0.06 (1.5)	0.00 (0.00)	0.14 (3.6)	0.18 (4.6)	0.26 (6.6)	0.21 (5.3)	0.22 (5.6)	0.39 (9.9)	2.76 (70.3)
Average precipitation days (≥ 0.01 in)	3.2	2.7	1.9	0.7	0.3	0.1	0.8	1.4	1.1	0.9	1.3	2.8	17.2
Source 1: NOAA
Source 2: National Weather Service

== See also ==
- California Historical Landmarks in San Bernardino County, California
- California Historical Landmarks in Riverside County, California
- Camp Coxcomb
- Camp Granite
- Camp Clipper and Camp Essex
- Camp Coxcomb
- Camp Ibis
- California during World War II
