= JFE Steel =

Japanese steel company

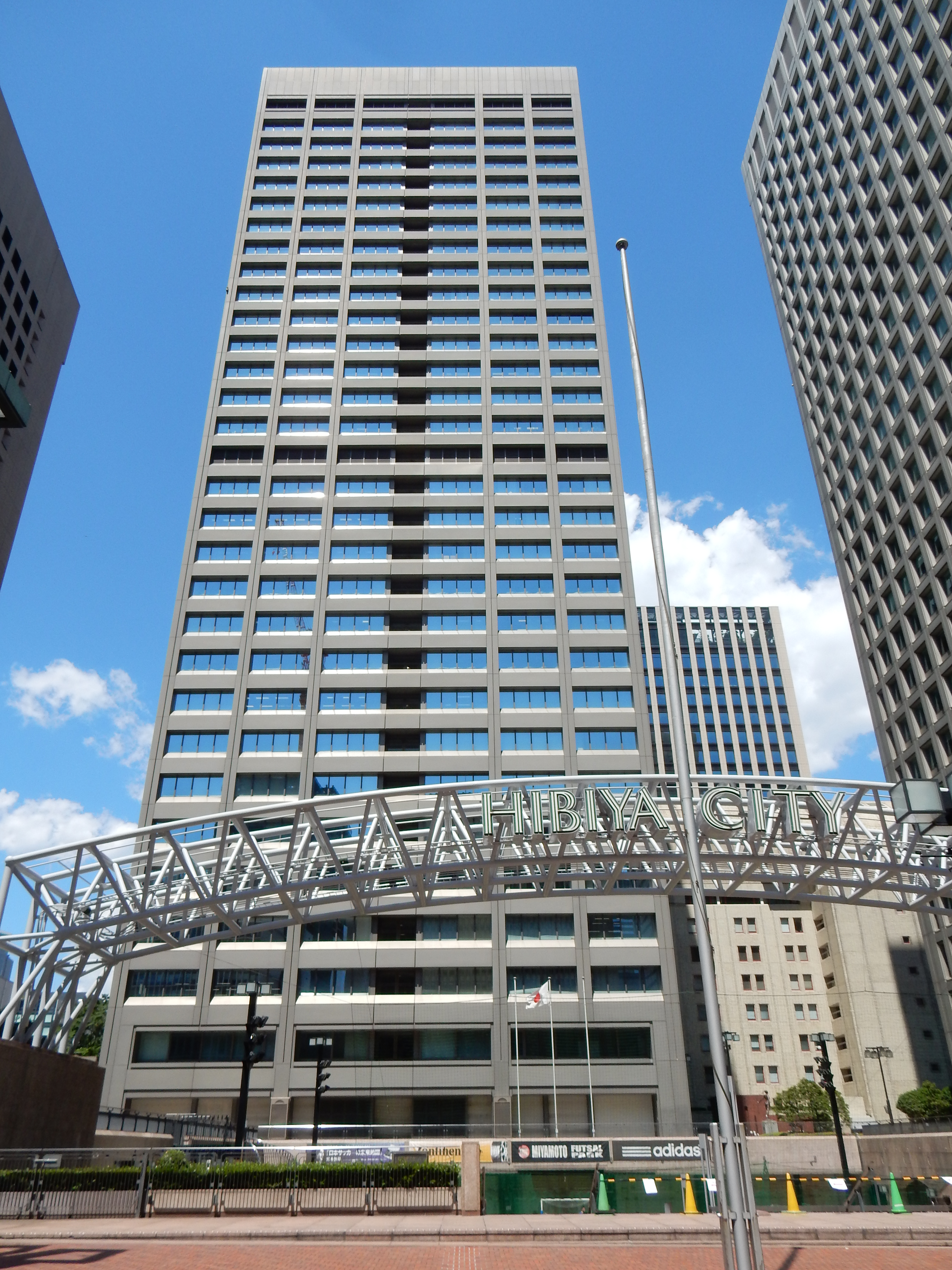
JFE Holdings and JFE Steel are headquartered in Hibiya International Building (日比谷国際ビル), Tokyo, where Kawasaki Steel was headquartered.

JFE Steel (Japanese: JFEスチール) is the second largest Japanese steel manufacturer (after Nippon Steel). The company was created in 2002 through the merger of the steel manufacturing business of Kawasaki Steel and NKK (Nihon Kokan). It is owned by JFE Holdings, which is listed on the Tokyo Stock Exchange.

== Recent Mergers and Spinoffs ==
JFE Steel was created in 2002 as Kawasaki Steel absorbed the steel making business of Nihon Kokan (NKK). At the same time, NKK's engineering business absorbed Kawasaki Steel's engineering business to form JFE Engineering (JFEエンジニアリング).

In the same year of 2002, NKK's shipbuilding business was spun off as a separate entity, which in the same year merged with Hitachi Shipbuilding to form Universal Shipbuilding, that then in 2013 was merged with IHI's shipbuilding business to become Japan Marine United Corporation.

After these mergers and spinoffs, JFE Steel is the second largest steel company in Japan, after Nippon Steel & Sumitomo Metal. Overseas, it owns 49% of California Steel Industries, US. It is in a limited partnership with AK Steel, formerly called Armco. In Korea, it owns 15% of Dongkuk Steel. In China, it has a joint hot rolling and electrogalvanization mill with Guangzhou Iron & Steel Enterprise Group (广州钢铁企业集团). In Thailand, it owns 80% of Thai Cold Rolled Steel Sheet Public Co., Ltd., which produces electrogalvanized steel sheets.

== History of Kawasaki Steel ==
Kawasaki Heavy Industries (KHI) started its business as a shipbuilding company in 1878 in Kawasaki, Kanagawa, and started to make steel for its own purpose in 1906. In the post-World War II recovery of 1950, KHI spun off its steel-making business as Kawasaki Steel.

Kawasaki Steel opened Chiba Iron Works in 1951, followed by Mizushima Iron Works, now called Kurashiki Iron Works, in 1961. In 1989, it entered into a limited partnership with Armco, US. The company was renamed AK Steel Holding in 1993 when it became publicly traded. Kawasaki Steel together with Brazil's Vale do Rio Doce (now Vale) re-established California Steel Industries in 1986.

It made cooperative agreement with Korea's Dongkuk Steel in 1991 and another agreement with Hyundai Hysco in 2000.

== History of NKK ==
Nihon Kokan Co., Ltd. (NKK), was established in 1912 with a steel pipes plant in Kawasaki, Kanagawa, on Tokyo Bay, in 1912 by Asano zaibatsu. After the Second World War, the plant was re-established there in 1946. In 1968, the steel making facilities of Kawasaki, Tsurumi and Mizue were integrated into Keihin Iron Works.

NKK opened Fukuyama Iron Works in Fukuyama, Hiroshima, in 1965. In 1976, it expanded its Keihin Iron Works to Ogishishima, a newly reclaimed island in Tokyo Bay, with a blast furnace, immediately followed by a converter, a billet/bloom/slab rolling mill and a plate rolling mill. In 1979, a second blast furnace and a hot rolling mill were added.

NKK acquired 50% of National Steel in 1990, but sold this American company to U.S. Steel in 2002.

== Major plant locations ==
The steel production sites of JFE Steel, a JFE Holding subsidiary, are organized into two regions, East Japan and West Japan.

=== East production sites ===
There are two major steel works in the East Japan Production Sites (JFEスチール東日本製鉄所):

==== Keihin Steel Works ====
After the Second World War, the plant was re-established there in 1946. Its Tsurumi site, Mizue site and the first blast furnace in Mizue were established, respectively, in 1947, 1959 and 1962. In 1968, all these three sites were integrated into Keihin Works (京浜製鉄所). New works in Ogishima (扇島), a newly reclaimed land nearby, started operation in 1976, and the second blast furnace was constructed there in 1978. Currently only one out of two blast furnace are in operation.

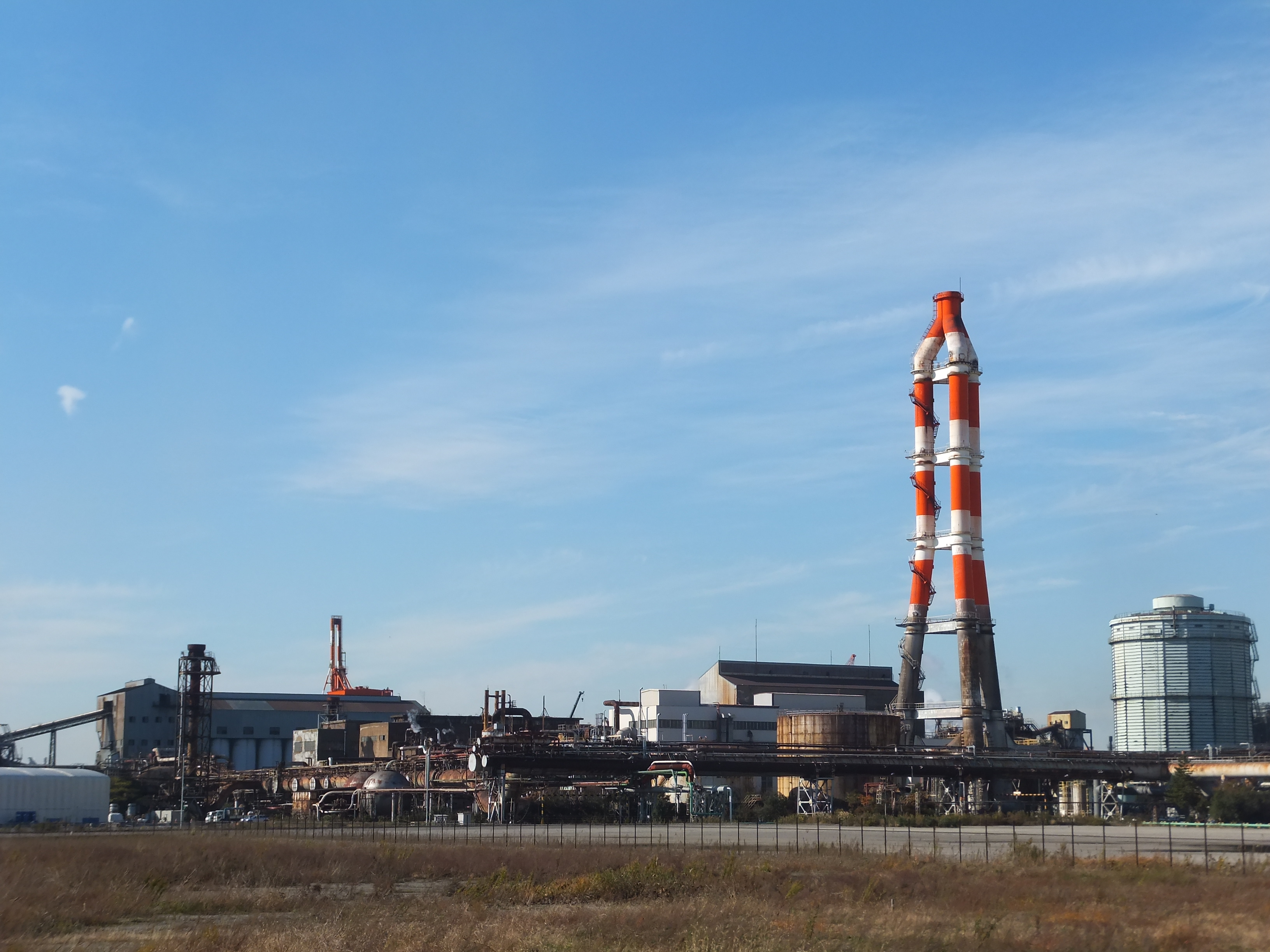
Chiba Steel Works's blast furnace

==== Chiba Steel Works ====
Kawasaki Heavy Industries incorporated Kawasaki Steel in 1965. Kawasaki Steel constructed Japan's most modern steel works in 1951, in Chiba, Chiba (千葉製鉄所), on Tokyo Bay. The first, second, fifth and sixth furnaces were completed, respectively, in 1953, 1958, 1965, and 1977. The first four furnaces are already demolished.

=== West production sites ===
There are two major steel works in the West Japan production sites (JFEスチール西日本製鉄所):

==== Kurashiki Steel Works ====
Kurashiki Steel Works (倉敷製鉄所), which used to be known as Mizushima Steel Works, was established by Kawasaki Steel in 1961, in Mizushima, Kurashiki, Okayama on the Inland Sea, adjacent to Mitsubishi Motors's Mizushima Plant. As of February, 2010, three out of four blast furnaces are in operation.

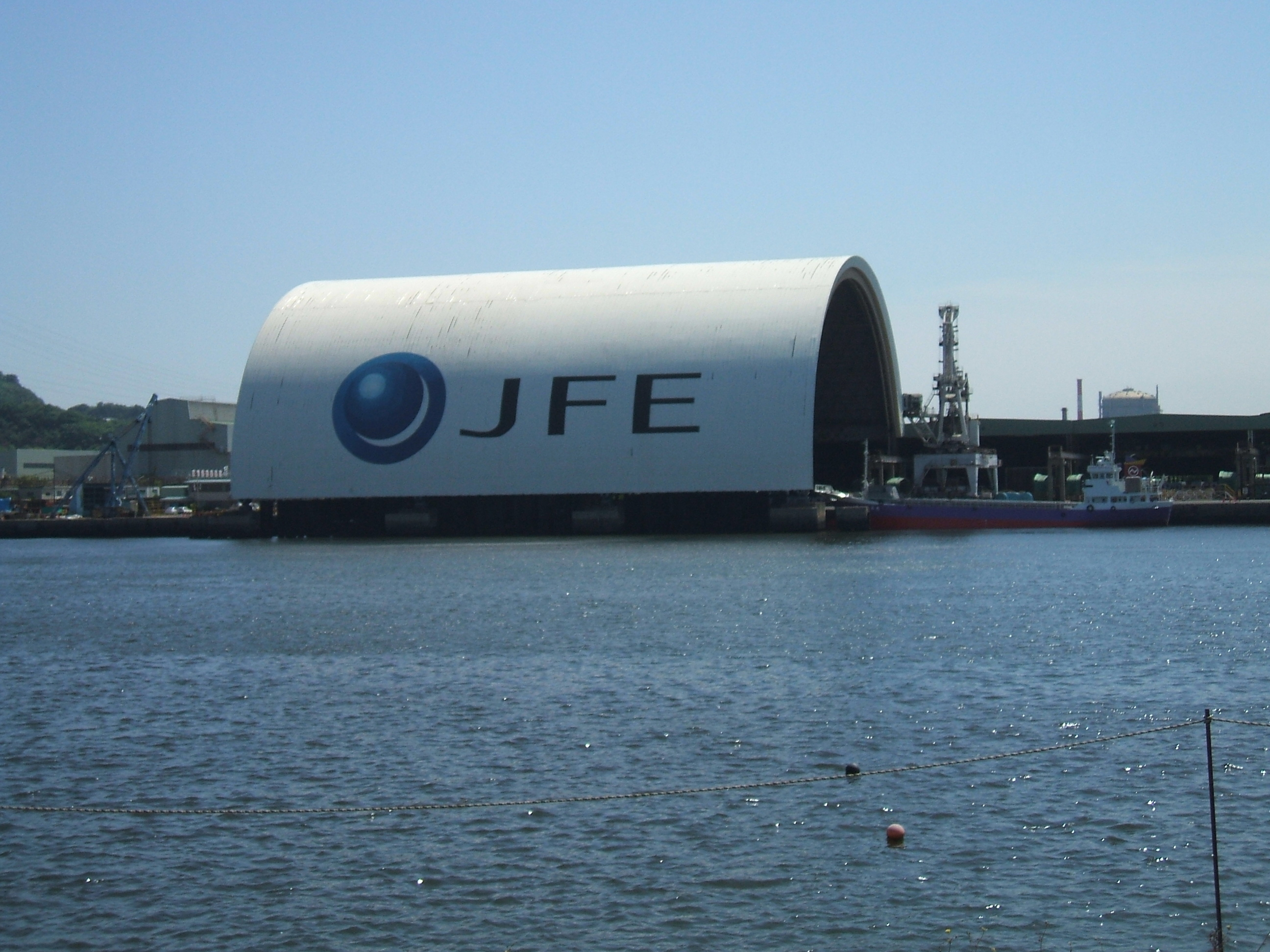
The roof of the shipment quays at Fukuyama Steel Works

==== Fukuyama Steel Works ====
Fukuyama Steel Works(福山製鉄所) in Fukuyama, Hiroshima, on the Inland Sea, opened in 1965 by Nippon Kokan. As of May 2011, three blast furnaces out of the existing four (Nos. 3, 4 and 5) are in operation.

== See also ==
- Nippon Steel
- Japan's Steel Works
