= Kaiser Steel =

Defunct American steel manufacturer

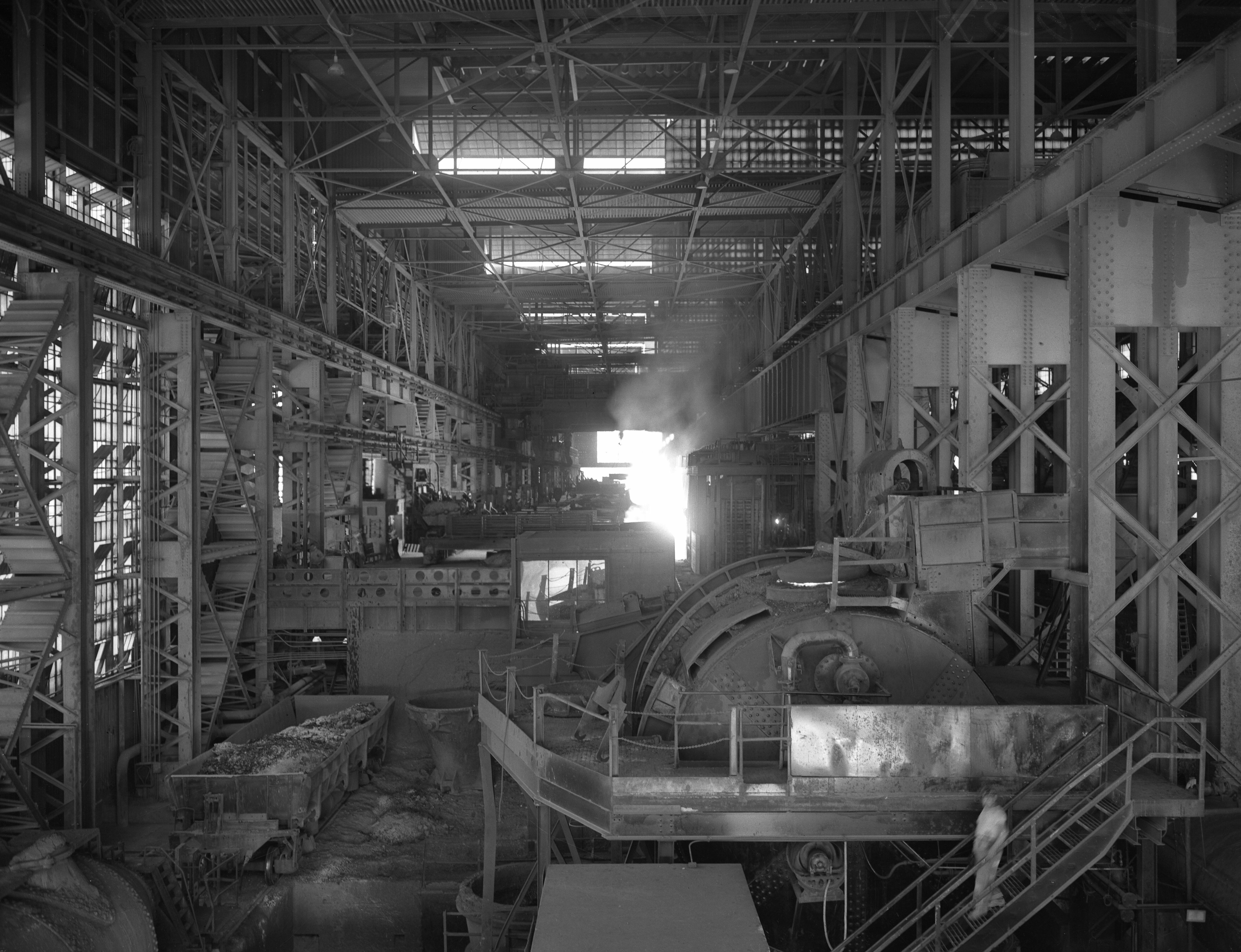
- Interior of Kaiser Steel Mill in Fontana, CA., c. 1949
- Industry: Steel
- Founded: December 1, 1941
- Founder: Henry J. Kaiser
- Defunct: December 1983
- Fate: Dissolved, portion of plant now California Steel Industries
- Headquarters: Fontana, California, U.S.
- Area served: Western United States, Japan
- Products: Steel slabs, finished steel products, iron ore
- Number of employees: 10,000 (peak)
- Parent: Kaiser Industries

Kaiser Steel was a steel company and integrated steel mill near Fontana, California. Industrialist Henry J. Kaiser founded the company on December 1, 1941, and workers fired up the plant's first blast furnace, named "Big Bess" after Kaiser's wife, on December 30, 1942. Then in August 1943, the plant would produce its first steel plate for the Pacific Coast shipbuilding industry amid World War II.

Resources for early production came from various sources, and the Fontana site presented some logistical disadvantages. However, the plant continued to grow in capacity after the war, adding more furnaces and metal rollers while also introducing new processes. The company would also eventually develop its own mines and railroad so that the steel mill formed a node in Kaiser's larger, vertically-integrated business.

The Korean War led to another surge in production, and by the 1960s, Kaiser Steel and competitor Geneva Steel, a U.S. Steel-owned plant near Salt Lake City, Utah, had captured most of the Pacific Coast steel market. Starting in the late 1960s though, Japanese and Korean steelmakers would begin out-competing the mill; despite attempts to adapt, the company would enter a steady decline until the mill closed in December 1983. Since then, much of the land in Fontana was sold to create the Auto Club Speedway, while a small portion of the plant still performs rolling operations under different ownership as California Steel Industries.

== Background ==
Prior to World War II, Henry J. Kaiser was already an established industrialist in construction, even participating in the Six Companies, the joint venture tasked with building Hoover Dam and other large infrastructure projects during the New Deal. Kaiser had also entered the shipbuilding business by 1940, focusing on merchant ships for the new United States Maritime Commission. As the war expanded, Kaiser would rapidly open several Kaiser Shipyards on the West Coast of the US, including four Richmond Shipyards located near San Francisco, California.

From the beginning, however, the time and cost of purchasing and shipping steel from the Eastern United States cut into the efficiency (and profitability) of the shipyards. Wartime demand and shortages only made reliance on the Eastern steel mills more painful. Aware of this and risks to shipping through the Panama Canal, US government planners supported rapidly standing up steel production near the West Coast.

Political and personal reasons may have piqued Kaiser's interest in a Californian steel mill too. Besides ambition and confidence in his own problem-solving abilities, Kaiser had cultivated ties to several influential members of the Franklin D. Roosevelt administration. He had also established close business ties with Californian financier Amadeo Giannini, and though originally from New York State, Kaiser had himself become a strong proponent for industrializing the Western US, with greater independence from established industries to the east.

== Beginnings: 1941–1942 ==
=== Planning and funding ===
In the spring of 1941, industry on the US Pacific Coast, including the Kaiser Shipyards and other shipbuilders, still relied on expensive steel from the Eastern US. Beyond the cost of rail transport across country, high even under normal circumstances, the distant steel companies typically charged a large markup for Western customers (sometimes as high as $20 per ton). Capacity itself had also become an issue. Although the US had not yet directly entered World War II, US rearmament and support for allies had pushed demand for finished steel beyond what the Eastern mills could produce. Rail infrastructure also limited shipments to the West Coast.

Though skeptical of expanding westward, this had led U.S. Steel to propose operating what would become the Geneva Steel plant in Utah. The company's only condition was that the government covered the plant's construction as a grant, arguing that the mill would likely become an uneconomical, stranded asset once the war ended and demand returned to peacetime levels. Kaiser, more optimistic about a western mill's long-term prospects and sensing an opportunity to outflank U.S. Steel, offered to build his own facility without any grants, just loans from the Reconstruction Finance Corporation (RFC).

Kaiser's initial plans from April 1941 were not necessarily for an integrated mill, but to refine steel ingots along with a finishing mill, forge, and foundry somewhere in the Los Angeles area. The primary input, less refined pig iron, would come from blast furnaces, possibly in a separate facility, which would source raw iron ore in turn from mines in Utah. This plan to produce finished steel in Los Angeles had several advantages: the tidewater location allowed for low-cost maritime transport, and electric power was cheap thanks to the hydroelectric plant at Hoover Dam. The area could also provide existing infrastructure and a large labor force.

Government planners did not respond enthusiastically at first, and Kaiser's proposal was delayed indefinitely, nominally because of doubts about sourcing raw materials. Throughout this time, Kaiser continued working on the proposal and formally incorporated the Kaiser Steel Corporation on December 1, 1941.

Following the attack on Pearl Harbor and direct US entry into World War II though, along with positive appraisals of Kaiser's existing factories, the US government switched its stance. Kaiser's proposal was fast-tracked and the RFC issued a loan of $110 million (equivalent to $1.66 billion in 2024) for construction of the mill, only with conditions.

=== Finding a site ===
The government's first condition was that the mill's initial size would be limited to wartime demand. The second, much more oppressive requirement was that the mill be sited at least 50 miles (80 km) inland, not in a tidewater area. The primary reason given for restricting the location was to limit the facility's vulnerability to a potential Japanese raid, but some such as writer and consultant A.G. Mezerik believed Eastern competitors had quietly lobbied for the requirement in order to handicap the facility's post-war potential.

Common wisdom in the steel industry was that a facility could not be profitable if more than one of the main links in its supply chain (inputs or products) relied on ground transport. An integrated mill at Los Angeles would already be risky, with reliance on rail transport for regional ore and coal only partly mitigated by easy port access. A plant further inland would lose even the advantage of the port. Yet Kaiser typically embraced a business strategy heavy on innovation and superior operations management. Also forecasting rapid growth in the Western market after the war, he believed the plant could still compete despite an unfavorable site.

After surveying the area, the new steel company quickly settled on the town of Fontana in San Bernardino County for the mill. Just 55 miles (89 km) inland, it was about as close to the sea as the government's conditions allowed. Additionally, it had excellent railroad connections and an especially good water supply network for the region, including its own hydroelectric plant. Kaiser may have been drawn to the smaller, rural community too, both for sentimental reasons and a shrewd recognition that local government would likely be more compliant should any disputes with the company arise.

== Up and running: 1942–1943 ==
=== Construction ===
The first public notice of the coming mill would appear in the local Fontana newspaper on 6 March 1942. Less than a month later, by 3 April, the company would break ground on the new site. The project and construction continued progressing rapidly, fast enough in fact that by 30 December of that year, the plant's coke ovens were already in operation, and Henry J. Kaiser himself was given the honor of starting the blast furnace, named "Big Bess" in honor of his wife.

=== Starting equipment ===
More sections of the mill would come online through the following year. By 15 December 1943, the facility occupied 1,300 acres (530 ha) of land and included the following property, plant, and equipment (PP&E):

Initial PP&E
Item	Process step	Count	Batch size	Production (1,000 tons / year)
Ore storage	Mineral processing			
Crushing and screening plant	Mineral processing			
Ore bedding system	Mineral processing			
Sinter plant	Mineral processing	1		493
Coke plant	Coking	90		340
Blast Furnace	Smelting	1	1,200 tons	388
Stationary open hearth furnaces	Steelmaking	5	185 tons	600
Tilting open hearth furnace (with mixer)	Steelmaking	1	185 tons	120
Electric arc furnace	Steelmaking	1	20 tons	30
Ingot mold foundry	Casting	1		28.8
Breakdown mill (Note: In steelmaking, "breakdown" is a term-of-art for the very first stage of rough rolling, which reduces cast ingots to blooms of more standard shape and size.)	Rough rolling	1	36 in. (cross-section)	420
Plate mill	Finish rolling	1	110 in. (width)	300
Structural mill	Finish rolling	1	29 in. (cross-section)	210
Merchant bar mills (Note: "Merchant bar" is a loose class of narrower steel bars, formed from billets into various cross-sections, and often used in joining structural steel elements or reduced further into narrower forms like bar stock.)	Finish rolling	3	21, 18, and 14 in. (cross-sections)	180
Alloy finishing facilities	Finishing			24
Slow cooling pits	Annealing			

=== Sourcing raw materials ===
The complete steelmaking process requires significant amounts of energy. The Fontana plant, hydroelectric plants at Hoover Dam and more locally at Lytle Creek could provide a baseline of less expensive and reliable electric power.

However, as an integrated mill, the plant would need regular shipments of raw materials to produce pig iron, which would then be refined into (primary) steel. The first requirement would be the iron ore itself. On that count, Fontana's location provided an advantage; plentiful iron deposits existed throughout the nearby Mojave Desert, even in San Bernardino County. For initial production, Kaiser Steel quickly purchased an iron mine near Kelso, California outright. Known as the "Vulcan Mine" (35°0′45″N 115°39′13″W), it would serve as the mill's primary source of ore until 1948.

The next requirement would be limestone or dolomite. Either rock can be ground down and added to a blast furnace as a metallurgical flux, maintaining an ideal chemistry in the furnace while also binding the ore's waste minerals into slag. This ingredient posed no problem for the Kaiser plant either, as both rocks available nearby from various quarries in California and Nevada.

The mill would require one more input though: abundant metallurgical coal, which would be converted to coke first, then added to the blast furnace. With no available deposits within Southern California, or even neighboring Arizona and Nevada, sourcing coal would be one of the plant's main challenges throughout its lifetime. At first, Kaiser Steel would be forced to look as far as Sunnyside, Utah, specifically Utah Fuel Company Mine No. 2 (39.55521°N 110.37909°W), which Kaiser would lease entirely in 1943.

In combination, Kaiser Steel's logistical costs (measured in ton-miles (Note: Tonnage shipped of a given material multiplied by the distance to ship, often normalized to a final result such as one ton of product at the customer's point of delivery. This allows directly comparing and combining logistical demands for different materials and locations.)) did not doom the plant to failure. Flux and iron ore were particularly economical, and versus competitors, the cost of transporting finished steel from Fontana to the California coast was insignificant. The mill's coal costs, however, would largely negate these advantages. With costlier coal than any other blast furnace in the US, the plant would have to excel operationally to survive in the market.

== Wartime production: 1943–1953 ==
=== World War II ===
In August 1943, the first plate steel rolled off the Kaiser Steel production line; it would go into the hull of a Liberty ship, Richard Moczkowski, built at Kaiser's Richmond No. 2 yard. and launched on August 22. The majority of Kaiser Steel plate produced for WWII, however, would actually go to the California Shipbuilding yard on Los Angeles' Terminal Island, a mere 50 miles (80 km) from Fontana and massive enough to soak up most plate production.

Another destination for Fontana steel was a government-owned and Kaiser-operated ordnance forging plant, conveniently just 4 miles (6.4 km) southwest of Fontana, with PP&E including:

- A 48 acres (19 ha) site
- 207,500 square feet (19,280 m^{2}) under-roof
- Forging, annealing, and machining equipment

Over the course of WWII, Kaiser Steel's overall output would exceed even the much larger Geneva Steel mill in Utah. This was partly due to Kaiser finishing construction and starting production earlier than its competitor. The mill's steel ingot production would total 1,209,000 short tons (1,097,000 t), with uses including but not limited to:

- 547,000 short tons (496,000 t) of steel plate, enough for 230 ships
- 135,000 short tons (122,000 t) of structural forms
- 94,000 short tons (85,000 t) of forged shells (in 155mm, 90mm, and 8-in. calibers)
- 17,000 short tons (15,000 t) of merchant bar
- 155,000 short tons (141,000 t) of ingots exported to the United Kingdom in 1943 under Lend-Lease

=== Peacetime adjustments ===
Kaiser's nearby Vulcan Mine yielded iron ore that, while usable, was lower-quality, and so the company had begun looking for a more sustainable deposit very early on. In 1944, with WWII still ongoing, the company purchased a mining claim from Southern Pacific Railroad in Eagle Mountain, California (33°51′27″N 115°29′14″W). It would take another few years to complete the new mine; the first test charge of Eagle Mountain ore was added to the Fontana blast furnace in June 1947.

Though the mine was now operational, it was too far from existing rail facilities to serve as the mill's primary iron source. To solve this problem, Kaiser rapidly planned and built its own rail line. At a cost of $3,800,000, the new 52 miles (84 km) Eagle Mountain Railroad was completed on July 29, 1948, after just 11 months of work. The company-owned line connected Eagle Mountain to the nearest junction on Southern Pacific's main line, which could carry freight onward for the remaining 101 miles (163 km) to Fontana.

The company would achieve several tactical successes in the immediate post-war period too. When the 1946 United States steel strike erupted as part of the wider United States strike wave of 1945–1946, Kaiser's more collaborative approach to organized labor kept the mill open and running at full capacity. With European industry largely in ruins and other US mills on strike, Kaiser could sell into a global steel shortage at a large markup, even exporting some to the typically out-of-reach European market. Kaiser mining engineers and metallurgists also oversaw significant efficiency improvements, both at Eagle Mountain and in the Fontana mill.

Yet Kaiser suffered a financial and political setback in 1947, when multiple appeals to the RFC for a loan reduction were denied. This may have been due to the political tide in Washington, D.C. turning against New Deal supporters (and Henry J. Kaiser's allies). In a bitter contrast, the War Assets Administration sold the government-built Geneva mill to competitor U.S. Steel at just 25% of capital costs and despite U.S. Steel actually offering the lowest bid.

=== First expansion ===
Undeterred and buoyed by a large contract to provide steel for a major gas pipeline, the company would initiate a major expansion in late 1948. The centerpiece would be a 2nd blast furnace announced in January 1949, to be constructed by Consolidated Western Steel, the same contractor that had built furnace #1 in 1942. The completed furnace, nicknamed "Bess No. 2", would be "blown in" later that year on 13 October 1949.

Altogether, the expansion project would include:

1949 Facility Expansion
Item	Process	Batch Size	Number Added	New Total	Total Capacity	Details
Coke ovens	Coking		45	135	515,000 tons / yr	
Blast furnace	Smelting	1,200 tons	1	2	876,000 tons / yr	
Open hearth furnace	Steelmaking	185 tons *	1	7	980,000 tons / yr *	* Actual yields averaged a higher 210 tons per batch
Soaking pit (Note: A soaking pit furnace is designed to heat (or reheat) ingots prior to hot working.)	Hot working		1	7		2 hole
Slab heating furnace	Hot working	100 tons	1	2	200 tons / hr	First furnace also upgraded to 100 ton capacity
Large strip mill	Finish rolling	86-in (width)	1	1	60,000 tons / mon	4-high, 4-stand
Small strip and skelp mill	Finish rolling	< 16-in (width)	1	1	25,000 tons / mon	10-stand
Pipe mill	Finish rolling	5–14 in. (diameter)	1	1		Fretz-Moon type, pipe for butt welding applications
Small strip mill	Finish rolling	24-in (width)	1	1	24,000 tons / yr	Cold rolling

=== The Korean War ===
As in WWII, the onset of the Korean War boosted Pacific shipbuilding and demand for economical steel. Over the course of the war, Kaiser Steel would wind up expanding its workforce by almost 50%. Additionally, the company would purchase the entire Utah Fuel Company outright in 1950, including the previously leased Sunnyside mine.

The company would also seize the opportunity to significantly restructure its finances on the advice of Henry J. Kaiser's bankers, the Giannini family. In October 1950, Kaiser Steel would announce a financial plan to raise $125 million, sourced from:

- $60 million in mortgage bonds issued to institutional investors
- A $25 million line of credit backed by a consortium of 3 banks
- $40 million from an initial public offering, consisting of 1.6 million shares of preferred stock and 0.8 million shares of common stock

The company would first deploy its fresh capital towards paying off its government RFC loan, at a balance over $91 million, in full. With this lingering debt out of the way, it then turned its attention towards another expansion program, estimated to cost $24.5 million.

The expansion program consisted of a few major milestones:

- A new, larger, 200 ton open hearth furnace, the 8th at the plant. When completed in May 1951, it added 180,000 tons of annual capacity in steel ingot production, for a new plant total capacity of 1,380,000 tons.
- A 5-stand tinplate mill, with an annual capacity of 200,000 tons, which could further process rolled sheet from the plant's established large strip mill. Construction of the tinplate mill would begin in April 1951 and finish in August 1952, two months ahead of schedule.
- New crushing and screening equipment, including a magnetic separator, at Eagle Mountain to improve ore yields further.
- Two more soaking pits.
- Additional workshifts at various parts of the plant.

By 1953, the initial expansion plans had ballooned further to a total investment of $65 million. Additional PP&E included:

- A third blast furnace, capable of producing 438,000 tons of pig iron annually, which was blown in on June 2, 1953.
- 90 more coke ovens, half of them already in operation when the new blast furnace was started.
- A 9th open hearth furnace, with an annual capacity of 156,000 tons.
- Extending the large strip mill by 2 stands (for a total of 6).
- Another two soaking pits.

== Global competition: 1954–1974 ==
=== The Eisenhower era ===
Kaiser Steel could enter the mid-1950s with optimism. Decreasing military demand from the end of the Korean War was offset by other markets, not least a boom in California. In 1955, the company took other steps to rationalize its raw inputs. In addition to modernizing the Sunnyside coal mine in Utah, which could sustain current production for at least an estimated 80 years, Kaiser purchased 530,000 acres of coal-bearing land in Raton, New Mexico. The same year, Kaiser consolidated its flux supply by purchasing a large limestone deposit near Cushenbury, California, just 75 miles (121 km) from Fontana.

At the opposite end of the value chain, Kaiser Steel would also acquire the Union Steel Co. of Los Angeles in 1955. A medium-sized business with approximately 300 employees on a 16.5-acre site, Union Steel had been founded in 1941 to fabricate structural elements and raise steel structures, but now also made aircraft and missile components. The acquisition would bring Kaiser vertical integration, with a stake in all steps of the steel industry, from mining raw materials to assembling steel structures.

Kaiser would continue to innovate organizationally too. When the United Steelworkers (USW) initiated the nationwide steel strike of 1959, Fontana's USW Local 2869 forced Kaiser to idle the plant (unlike in 1946). However, Kaiser would yet again break from its competitors, who maintained a hard line on work rules and new (more productive and therefore potentially job-cutting) technology, to negotiate a gainsharing program modeled on the Scanlon plan. Dubbed the "Long Range Sharing Plan" (LRSP), it would reward unionized Steelworkers in proportion to the company's success, according to a theoretically fair formula. The Steelworkers, in exchange, would accept more flexible job tasks and productivity-enhancing innovations.

The company would also continue to keep its facilities competitive, technologically and at scale, announcing another expansion program for 1957-1959. At the heart of the program, Fontana would add a 4th blast furnace for pig iron and supplement its 9 open hearths with 3 modern basic oxygen furnaces (BOFs), almost doubling its steel ingot capacity. Kaiser estimated that after the expansion, they would finally become the largest steel manufacturer in the American West.

By the completion of the program in 1959, the company had spent $214 million on the expansion, which included:

- Improvements at all of its mining properties
- Construction of a 2nd sintering plant
- The 4th blast furnace, which could produce 800,000 tons of pig iron annually (new capacity of 2,120,000)
  - Blast furnace #4 was blown in on January 15, 1959
- Relining of the other 3 blast furnaces
- 90 more coke ovens, for a total of 315 at Fontana
- The 3 BOFs, which could produce 1,440,000 tons of raw steel annually
- The addition of 10 soaking pits, for a total 32, all now sized to a larger capacity
- Addition of a new 46 x 90 in. slab mill
- Integration of a 5 stand mill in tandem with the existing large strip mill (11 stands total)
- Upgrading the tinplate mill from a previous capacity of 200,000 tons to 370,000
  - New pickling, continuous annealing, temper mill, and electroplating stations were also added.
- Addition of a new cold-rolling strip mill
- Resizing of the plate mill to a larger 148 in. capacity
- Expand size capacity (from 30 in. diameter to 42) at a company pipe mill in Napa, California for almost $500,000
  - The pipe and plate mill resizing were specified in order to compete for new lines being planned for Middle Eastern oil projects.
- An electrostatic precipitator for limiting air pollution, costing nearly $5 million

=== Going international ===
Kaiser Steel entered the 1960s more productive than ever, reaping the benefits of its recent expansion and breaking 18 records in 1961. The next year, the company would deliver a final blow to its competitors in the Eastern US with significant price cuts. No longer able to charge a premium for shipping steel cross-country, the Eastern steel makers mostly abandoned the Western market to Kaiser and Geneva Steel in Utah.

However, in the coming years, the company would make a series of fateful decisions, particularly in relation to the Japanese steel market. By the early 1960s, Japan's economic recovery from WWII had accelerated, creating significant demand for steel and other materials. While Japanese metal refineries were not yet competitive internationally, Japanese government and industry had committed to rebuilding their own heavy industry. At the same time, the larger Kaiser conglomerate would pause further modernization at Fontana for the remainder of the 1960s.

According to scholar Mike Davis, Henry J. Kaiser's retirement in the mid-1950s may have been a significant influence. Motivated by wealth management more than entrepreneurship or technical innovation, the Kaiser heirs began to prioritize Kaiser Aluminum, the conglomerate's most profitable subsidiary. Their primary concern became supporting aluminum sales to foreign buyers with other commodities, rather than maintaining Kaiser Steel's competitive edge in steel production. As a result, Kaiser Steel began diverting investment towards production and shipment of iron ore, both from Eagle Mountain and newly acquired mines.

Kaiser Steel began its period of ore exports in 1961 by concluding a 10-year contract with Japanese trading company Mitsubishi Shoji Kaisha Ltd., to ship 1 million tons of beneficiated iron ore annually from Eagle Mountain to Japan. Shipments would begin in late 1962 from the Port of Long Beach when new 58,000 ton bulk carriers built by Mitsubishi entered operation. The contract terms established a base price of $8.65 per ton at a purity of 61% iron content, with adjustments for higher or lower purity shipments.

By December 1963, Kaiser had boosted its partnership with Mitsubishi even further, negotiating an additional 6-year contract to ship 1 million tons annually of even higher-quality pelletized ore. (Note: The existing 10-year contract for beneficiated ore remained in effect and would operate in parallel.) The new contract included an option to extend to 10 years for 10 million cumulative tons, and also established a joint technical committee to oversee the relatively new pelletizing technology. The technical committee, a historical first in the steel industry, would bring together specialists from Kaiser, Mitsubishi, and other Japanese steelmakers party to the deal, (Note: The 5 Japanese steel works involved in the deal were: Yawata Iron & Steel Co. (Sakai), Fuji Iron & Steel Co. (Muroran), Nippon Kokan K. K. (Kawasaki), Sumitomo Metal Industries Ltd. (Wakayama) and Nisshin Steel Works Ltd (Kure).) with the intent of continually improving the pelletized ore's quality. Mitsubishi would build another three 58,000 ton bulk carriers to transport the additional ore from California, with shipments expected to begin in late 1965. By May 1964, Kaiser and Mitsubishi were confident enough about the pelletized ore deal to renegotiate an 80% boost in shipments, for 1.8 million tons annually.

Seeking even more opportunities to profit from Japanese demand for ore, Kaiser acquired sources beyond Eagle Mountain and even the US. In July 1962, Kaiser formed a joint venture with mining company Conzinc Riotinto of Australia to develop iron mines in the Hamersley Range of Australia. Kaiser Steel would hold a 40% stake in the resulting company, Hamersley Iron, which in the following year, signed a 30-year agreement with the Government of Western Australia. This agreement not only affirmed the mineral rights of Hamersley Iron (and Kaiser Steel) but tentatively offered government funding for standing up Australia's steel industry in the future. By early 1964, Hamersley Iron had already begun negotiating an initial 15-year contract for iron ore exports to Japan, at a rate several times larger than Kaiser Steel's exports from Eagle Mountain.

=== The Vietnam War ===
The late 1960s and early 1970s would prove very different from the previous 15 years of prosperity for Kaiser Steel. As Mike Davis remarks, several deeply ironic problems began to drag the company down. Two decades after Kaiser Steel was founded, in part to help fight imperial Japan, Japanese steel makers rapidly began to seize market share from the company. Even more ironic, Kaiser Steel enthusiastically supplied the very same Japanese companies with iron ore and coal from its mining division throughout.

After a generation at the cutting technological edge of steel manufacturing, Fontana would suddenly find itself burdened with obsolete facilities by the 1970s too. Kaiser had mostly rested from further modernization after standing up its pelletizer at Eagle Mountain and three BOFs at Fontana. No attempt had been made to phase out the open hearth furnaces or other equipment from an earlier generation of the Fontana plant. Meanwhile, Asian and European steel makers, largely rebuilding from scratch after the devastation of World War II and other conflicts, were moving entirely to BOFs, continuous casting lines, improved blast furnaces and coking ovens, etc.

Environmental problems in Southern California had also started to impose themselves on the company. As the region rapidly grew, air pollution and smog had become severe problems, and Fontana consistently showed some of the worst air quality readings. The irony here was that topography and wind patterns concentrating pollution from LA to the west were probably as much to blame for Fontana's poor air as the steel plant. Nonetheless, the plant became a potent symbol for a constellation of different groups seeking cleaner air.

Even on the labor front, the artifacts of Kaiser's earlier cooperation began to have unintended consequences. The complexity of the LRSP, designed to be fair when initially created, compensated workers differently and abstracted rewards from workers' individual efforts, either in daily tasks or improvement programs. As a result, the seemingly arbitrary rewards aggravated divisions between labor and management, and also within the union local. Tensions escalated further when Kaiser abandoned its earlier ethos and hired more confrontational, outside managers from (of all places) its former adversaries in the Eastern US.

Outside of Kaiser's immediate choices, America's growing commitment to the Vietnam War indirectly provided an opening to its competitors. Military spending and the downstream economic stimulus had led to an economic boom, especially in California. However, the war also distracted America strategically and industrially, creating space for European, Korean, and especially Japanese exporters to meet the extra demand. It would be one last irony, that while World War II had given birth to Kaiser Steel, and the Korean War had helped propel it to a world-leader (technologically if not in scale), a third American war in Asia would help trigger its decline.

== Final days: 1975 to today ==
=== Decline ===
By the mid-1970s, Kaiser Steel had lost much of its market share to cheaper imports from Japanese and Korean steelmakers. Labor disputes and pressure over environmental issues had only hardened too. The company had fallen on such hard times that it contemplated exiting the basic steel slab market.

Instead, in 1975, Kaiser Steel reversed course and gambled on a massive investment program to modernize the facility. A major wrinkle was that the regional air pollution control board had imposed a commitment from Kaiser for pollution control measures, ultimately costing $127 million, over half of the modernization budget.

Partly because Fontana could only hope to compete on price and efficiency now (not volume), partly because of the tight budget, and partly because of environmental regulations, the plant would scrap most of its older refining capacity (and the associated jobs). Only the newest BOF hearths and continuous casting lines would remain in operation. Paradoxically though, Kaiser successfully argued replacing its coking ovens and blast furnaces would bankrupt the plant, and so the outdated (and heavily polluting) ironmaking facilities would remain in operation. When the new upgrades went online in early 1979, the plant was still nominally capable of producing 2.3 million tons of high-grade carbon steel a year.

Also in 1979, the company sold its remaining Australian mining interests to partner Conzinc Riotinto. The Hamersley mines had never contributed much ore to Fontana, but they were highly profitable, offsetting the operating losses at the Californian plant. However, the proceeds from the sale freed up badly needed capital, both to pay down debt from the plant modernization and give the company room to maneuver financially.

Unfortunately by late 1979, the plant upgrade had disappointed enough stakeholders that the company replaced the current CEO with Edgar Kaiser Jr., grandson of founder Henry J. Kaiser. Initially billed as a savior following in his grandfather's footsteps, it turned out the Kaiser family had seen the writing on the wall and already decided to restructure the steel subsidiary. Their plan was to refocus entirely on mineral holdings and mines, sell as much as possible of the Fontana plant as a going concern to another company, and scrap the rest. This plan collapsed, however, when Japanese steelmaker Nippon Kokan KK, the most likely buyer, declined to purchase Fontana following inspections by its own engineering teams. When a sharp recession and collapsing steel demand ushered in the new year (1980), the company had passed the point of no return.

=== Closure ===
In November 1981, a new management team announced that Kaiser Steel would shut down all ironmaking (blast furnaces and coking ovens) and steelmaking (BOFs and casting lines) at Fontana, along with all mining at Eagle Mountain. Although the company had eked out a profit in the first 3 quarters of 1981, the preceding 18 quarters had seen pre-tax losses, and fabrication (various finishing mills at Fontana) contributed most of the company's profits. Write-offs related to the shutdown were estimated in advance at a minimum of $150 million.

With the company rapidly unwinding and Japanese steelmakers uninterested, both the union local and major shareholders searched desperately for someone to save the Californian facilities. These last-minute appeals revolved around an employee stock ownership plan (ESOP), where the workers themselves would partly buy out Fontana and Eagle Mountain from Kaiser via the union, absorbing much of the risk. Hopefully another investor would then feel comfortable taking on the remaining equity and reviving the plant. Initially, the British Steel Corporation expressed some interest, followed by the San Franciscan investment group of Stanley Hiller. In both cases, however, resistance from the board of directors and spiraling write-offs scared away any potential rescuers.

Finally in October 1983, the remaining workers smelted the last stored ore from Eagle Mountain. As various stations finished working this final batch of Fontana steel, they would progressively shut down, until December 31, 1983, when Kaiser Steel officially ended operations at 4 PM and shuttered the mill.

Over its lifetime, the mill had produced about 75 million tons of steel.

=== Liquidation and salvage ===
Following a bidding war and leveraged buyout of the company, corporate raiders quickly sold off Fontana and Eagle Mountain to a consortium backed by Brazilian firm (and creditor) Companhia Vale do Rio Doce (now Vale), along with partner Japanese firm Kawasaki Steel (now JFE Holdings). In exchange for physical assets, valued at about $120 million, Kaiser Steel would be released from its debts to Vale.

The new joint venture, California Steel Industries (CSI), would only utilize the finishing portions of the plant to process imported steel slabs further. The primary steelmaking equipment, installed in 1979, would remain idle at Fontana until 1993. In that year, CSI struck a deal with China's Shougang (Capital Steel and Iron Corporation) to sell the still relatively modern steelmaking equipment for $15 million (equivalent to $28.7 million in 2024). Shougang would also spend $400 million (equivalent to $766 million in 2024) to dismantle the equipment, ship it to southern China, and reassemble as one of China's most advanced steel mills for the time.

Although the Californian facilities were ultimately disposed of, the remaining shell of Kaiser Steel retained significant healthcare and pension obligations to its former employees. Then in 1987, following another corporate raid and change of management, the company filed for Chapter 11 bankruptcy with the intent of discharging all of its pension obligations. The US government-owned Pension Benefit Guaranty Corporation would ensure former employees still received a pension, but not the full defined benefits promised by Kaiser in better times.

=== Land reuse ===
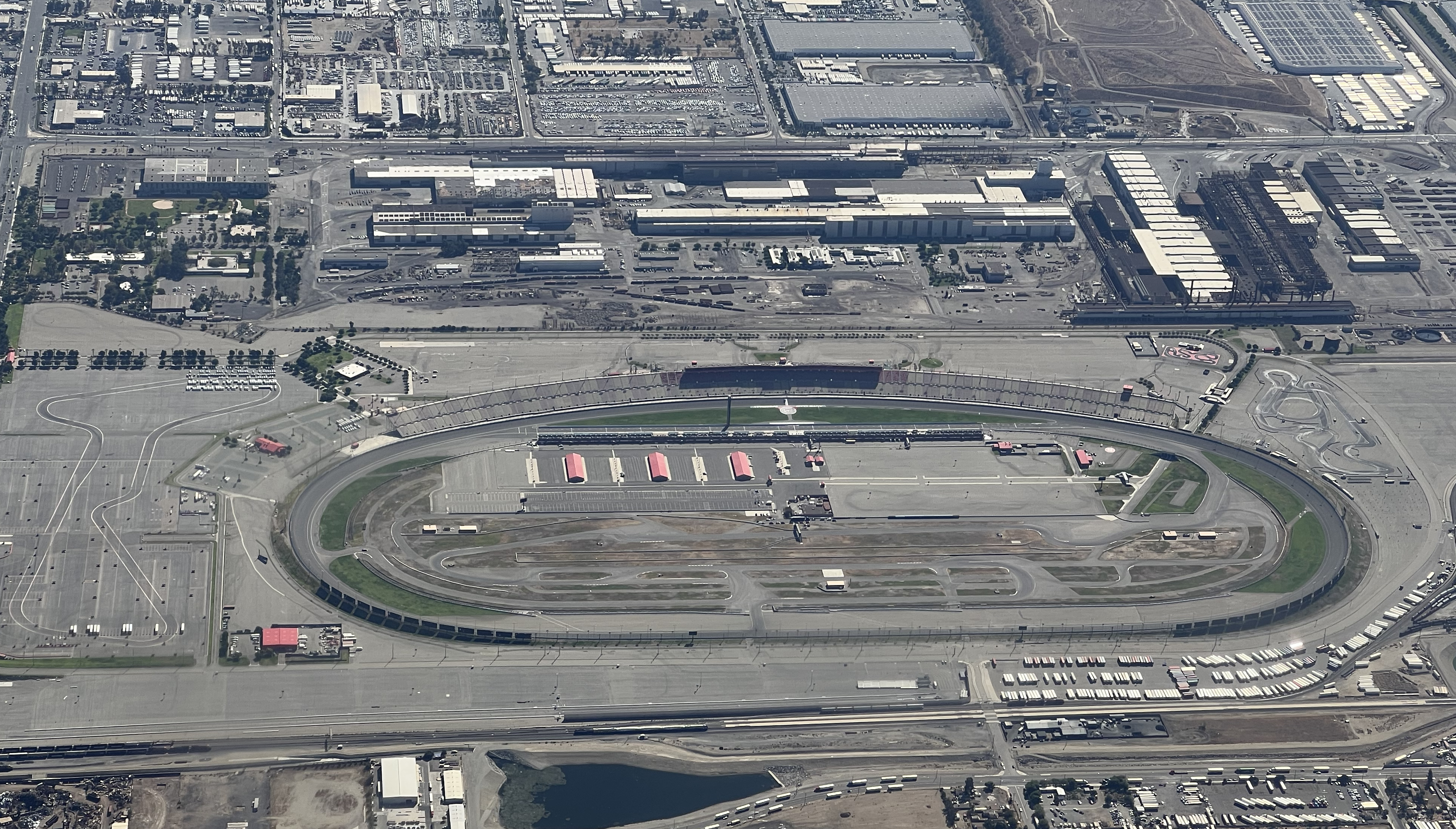
Aerial site view in 2021. Auto Club Speedway is in the foreground, California Steel Industries is in the distance.

In 1988, while re-establishing the finishing mill under CSI, Vale reorganized all other assets of the Kaiser Steel Company under a corporate spin-off named Kaiser Ventures. In addition to most of the sprawling 1,800-acre (730 ha) site, only 400 acres (160 ha) of it occupied by CSI, the new company retained associated rights and even the closed Eagle Mountain mine.

In 1990, Kaiser Ventures would lease its Fontana water rights to the Cucamonga County Water District, which provides municipal water to the western portion of San Bernardino County. Royalty payments for these water rights allowed the company to stay in business through further land recycling projects. Next, the company demolished any remaining abandoned structures on the site. Since the Kaiser Steel facility had ultimately been built with more steel per square foot than any other structure in the US, the resale of scrap metal provided further income.

In 1995, after finishing environmental remediation, Kaiser Ventures sold off a large portion of the Fontana site to Penske Speedways, in order to create the California Speedway, now a NASCAR-owned motorsport track.

The company also explored reusing the abandoned Eagle Mountain mine as a landfill, but after planning fell through, the Eagle Mountain site was sold to Eagle Crest Energy for construction of a hydroelectric project. The ghost town at Eagle Mountain was sold in 2023.

== In popular culture ==
Writer Ayn Rand visited Kaiser Steel in October 1947, as part of her research for the novel Atlas Shrugged, a large part of which takes place at the fictional "Rearden Steel". The Journals of Ayn Rand include numerous observations on the plant's daily routine and technical processes like smelting. (Note: One sample quotation remarks on furnace names: "Blast furnaces are usually named after women. The one at Kaiser's is named 'Bess' after Mrs. Kaiser and is referred to by the workers as 'Old Bess'".)

The 1952 romance movie Steel Town, set in the fictional Kostane steel works, includes scenes filmed in Fontana and the mill itself as a major plot element. Later movie scenes filmed on-site, after most of the facility ceased operation, include:

- Abandoned power plant scenes from the 1985 horror film A Nightmare on Elm Street 2: Freddy's Revenge
- The wilshire detention zone scene in the 1987 sci fi film The Running Man
- Live-action scenes from the 1988 independent, sci-fi film In the Aftermath
- The steel mill scene at the end of the 1991 sci-fi, action film Terminator 2: Judgment Day (special effects simulated continuing plant operations)
- The opening ten minute sequence of 1992 cyberpunk action film Nemesis
- The final standoff scene in the 1994 action film Direct Hit
- The decriminalized zone in the 1994 sci fi, action film T-Force
- Outworld scenes from the 1995 fantasy action film Mortal Kombat
- Scenes representing Los Angeles after an alien attack in the 1996 sci-fi, action film Independence Day

Other uses include:

- In 1995, thousands attended an underground rave, billed as "Stargate", on the site after being shuttled in from a nearby shopping center.
- In early 2000, American rock band Green Day filmed the music video for the song Macy's Day Parade at the site, which was set to release later that year off their album Warning.

Between 1987 and 1991, former Santa Fe 3751, a 4-8-4 Northern type steam locomotive, was restored to operating condition at the mill.

== See also ==
- Richmond Shipyards (37°54′22.3″N 122°21′52.79″W)
- California Shipbuilding (CalShip) (33°45′40″N 118°15′05″W)
- Geneva Steel integrated mill (40°19′N 111°45′W)
- Colorado Fuel and Iron closest large integrated steel mill prior to World War II (38.229°N 104.607°W)
- Pilbara Iron, for a detailed history on Kaiser Steel's holdings in Australia
