= Sungho Group =

South Korean company

Sungho Group (Korean: 성호그룹) is a South Korean company headquartered in Gyeongju, South Korea.

Sungho Group was founded by Son Myoung Ik in November 1994 as a steel scrap company known as Daeho Steel. In 2002 Daeho Steel incorporated into Sungho Co., LTD. By 2010 Sungho Co. was the largest steel scrap company in South Korea, supplying around 1,000,000 metric tons of steel scrap/year. In the 2000s Sungho Group diversified its business into recycling, metal abrasives, castings, automotive parts, plants, construction and a resort.

== History ==
=== 1994–2002 ===
In November 1994 Son Myoung Ik founded Daeho Steel as a steel scrap company. During August 2002 he incorporated Daeho Steel into Sungho Co., Ltd.

=== 2006–2009 ===
In March 2006 Sungho expanded into construction. March 2007 Sungho Co. acquired the ISO9001 and TS16949. In January 2009 Sungho Co. acquired Taekwang Cast Iron and established it as Sungho Metal.

=== Sungho Resort ===
The construction of Sungho Resort at Gyeongju, South Korea was completed in February 2013.

== Subsidiaries and affiliates ==
=== Sungho Metal ===
Sungho Metal produces 26,000 tons of automotive parts yearly and various industrial items.

=== Sungho Steel ===
Since 2006, Sungho Metal distributes rebar and other steel products to construction sites.

=== Sungho Construction ===
Sungho Construction is best known for its role in building factories, apartments, and office buildings. Beginning in 2006 Sungho Construction completed many projects such as the Dorisa Temple and the First Introduction Site of Buddhism in the Silla Period.

=== Sungho Recycling ===
Established in 2015, Sungho Recycling is responsible for supplying 1 million tons of steel scrap to steel mills in South Korea.

== Main clients ==
- Posco
- Hyundai Steel
- Dongkuk Steel
- Hyundai Heavy Industries
- Daewoo Shipbuilding & Marine Engineering
- DSME
- Samsung Heavy Industries
- Hanjin Heavy Industries
- Hyundai
- Hyundai Wia
- Mando Corp.

== International clients ==
- Isuzu
- Kobelco
- Hitachi
- Nippon Steel
- Toyota
- Mitsubishi
- Citizen
- Shimano
- Keppel
- Kawasaki
- Nissan
