= Nippon Kokan =

Nippon Kokan may refer to:

- Nippon Kokan (NKK), a steelmaking and shipbuilding company, now part of JFE Holdings
- NKK F.C., their former association football club until 1994
