= Special effects of Terminator 2: Judgment Day =

The special effects of the 1991 American science fiction action film Terminator 2: Judgment Day were developed by four core groups: Industrial Light & Magic (ILM), Stan Winston Studio, Fantasy II Film Effects, and 4-Ward Productions. Pacific Data Images and Video Images provided some additional effects.

== Overview ==
=== Pre-production ===
While writing Terminator 2, director/writer James Cameron and his co-writer, William Wisher Jr., created a villain based on an abandoned idea Cameron had for its predecessor, The Terminator (1984). The T-1000 was a machine made of liquid metal who adopted the form of an average human. To ensure their ideas were viable with current visual effects technology, the pair frequently consulted with special effects studio Industrial Light & Magic (ILM). ILM had assisted on Cameron's previous film, The Abyss (1989), with realizing a water-like alien being, similar to what would become the T-1000. The unprecedented use of digital effects was risky, because if they did not work, then the entire film could fail.

A ten-month schedule and approximately $15–$17 million US$15,000,000 (equivalent to $35,456,878 in 2025) of the film's budget were allocated to the film's special effects, with $5 million US$5,000,000 (equivalent to $11,818,959 in 2025) separately allocated to the T-1000. Co-producers Stephanie Austin and B. J. Rack determined that the 150 visual effects of Terminator 2 could not be realized by ILM alone, so the project was segmented into four core groups: ILM under special effects supervisor Dennis Muren managed the computer-generated imagery (CGI) effects, Stan Winston Studio created the prosthetics and animatronics, Fantasy II Film Effects (who also worked on The Terminator) developed miniatures and optical effects, and 4-Ward Productions was responsible for creating a nuclear explosion effect. The cost of producing CGI and practical limitations of staff numbers meant the technique was used sparingly, appearing in 42–43 shots, alongside 50–60 practical effects.

A truncated three-month pre-production cycle began in July 1990, as locations were scouted and effects sequences were designed and storyboarded. Cameron provided storyboards for every scene, while effects designer John Bruno and artist Philip Norwood were responsible for storyboards for effects and action sequences. Cameron spent several hours a day over a week choreographing vehicle scenes with toy cars and trucks, filming the results, and printing out the frames for the storyboard artists to transpose. There was no time to properly test out practical effects before filming; if they did not work, they would have to be worked around.

ILM underwent a major expansion. The six-person CGI team that worked on The Abyss was not viable for the scale of Terminator 2, and the team was expanded to 35 people, including software engineers and animators hired from around the world. ILM invested $3 million in purchasing new equipment, including eleven high-powered, five medium, and ten small Silicon Graphics computers. A further $500,000 investment was used to create software specifically for Terminator 2.

By the start of principal photography in early October, the effects teams were set up to begin work. Scenes requiring the most time-consuming post-production visual effects were scheduled to be filmed first, with Muren and his team on location to supervise the recording of their various VistaVision plates that would later have effects added. To compensate for the difficulties of matching visual effects to live-action footage where the camera was in motion, it was organized that the background plates would be filmed in a static position and a moving version would only be made if time allowed. Those scenes storyboarded to feature a camera move were performed using a motion control camera system, allowing a computer to read and replicate its movements later.

Despite working with a substantial budget compared to his other work, cinematographer Adam Greenberg did not have the freedom he thought he would, mainly because of the sheer complexity and scope of the project and the high number of crew to manage. He remarked that where he used to shout instructions to his crew on other films, Terminator 2 required 187 Motorola walkies-talkies to keep in touch. His long-time colleague Mike Benson led second unit photography.

The production went on right up to the eve of the film's release due to the time taken to render shots, with one of the most difficult and last scenes rendered being the T-1000's death. Cameron had chosen to have Consolidated Film Industries render the theatrical reels, which Austin described as unusual due to their relatively small team, but Cameron was fond of some of its crew, who worked across 24-hour shifts to meet the deadline while others (such as Austin) slept on the office floor to remain close to the project.

=== Crew ===
The film crew for Terminator 2 included:

- John Bruno (effects designer)
- Stephen Burg (conceptual artist)
- Doug Chiang (visual effects art director)
- Jamie Dixon (Pacific Data Images effects supervisor)
- Paul Gentry (camera operator)
- Julia Gibson (effects producer)
- Janet Healy (effects producer)
- Richard Hollander (Video Image project supervisor)
- Michael Joyce (Fantasy II supervisor)
- Michael Karp (camera operator)
- Peter Kleinow (puppet animator)
- Van Ling (visual effects coordinator)
- Shane Mahan (art department supervisor)
- Bret Mixon (rotoscope supervisor)
- Dennis Muren (ILM visual effects supervisor)
- Joseph Nemec III (production designer)
- Phillip Norwood (artist)
- Mark Segal (ILM mode shop)
- Robert Skotak (4-Ward visual effects supervisor)
- Dennis Skotak (4-Ward supervising director of photography)
- Gene Warren Jr. (Fantasy II effects supervisor)
- Steve Williams (ILM animation supervisor)
- Stan Winston (special makeup producer)

=== Technology ===
Terminator 2 used rear projection techniques, but because scenes were generally in motion, Bobby Gray developed a hanging rig with lights on a circular track that created a realistic movement of light. To avoid the lights from shining onto the rear projection screen, a new technique tunnel made of black cloth was used, deflecting the light away from the screen. These scenes were generally filmed at night on stages in Valencia because the crew was already acclimated to working a night schedule.

Greenberg used various methods for lighting and also made adjustments, such as wetting down the streets to enhance the contrast by making them darker. He also did this with cars, not so they would look wet, but to alter their color. Greenberg also used three different film stocks—Kodak 5297, Kodak 5245, and Kodak 5296—which gave richer colors, as he wanted to create a cold, blue aesthetic with elements of orange to provide warmth. For the hospital lighting, Greenberg wanted to go against a more traditional "bland and antiseptic" appearance achieved with fluorescent lighting; instead, he lit it from outside using xenon lights on towers to create an overexposed look which he believed made it less "soothing," although this made filming more difficult as the only in-film light came from outside.

In particular, ILM had to increase its artist count to 35 to produce the effects for the T-1000 during just four to five minutes of screen time, at a cost of $5.5 million. The CGI was so complex that 15 seconds of footage could take up to ten days to render, and the film contained about 150 visual effects shots across four different teams. A variety of software was used to produce the film, such as Alias, RenderMan, Photoshop, and a variety of programs written specifically for the film.

== Stunts ==
=== Highway pursuit ===
About $1 million was spent on stunts, one of the largest ever stunt budgets at the time. One of the most demanding night scenes, the highway chase, was filmed along 5.5 miles (8.9 km) of highway over three weeks. The production had to rent cabling from many studios, including Paramount, Disney, and Universal, because of the difficulty of running lights across the entire stretch of highway. Lighting was provided by Musco lights with lighting on condor cranes with 12k HMIs on each, requiring 11 generators to power. It took the full crew two weeks to prepare everything, and it had to be planned meticulously by gaffer Gary Tondreau to ensure costs did not spiral out of control. For closeups of actor Robert Patrick (who played the T-1000) in the helicopter, a mock-up helicopter was built and suspended from a crane arm attached to a moving flatbed truck, which was also used when the helicopter crashes into the SWAT van carrying the T-800, Sarah, and John.

Cameron wanted to shoot scenes continuously in one, long sequence and used cameras inside cars and helicopters flown by stunt pilots Chuck and Mike Tamburro. Chuck also performed the stunt of the helicopter flying under a bridge, with only 5 feet (1.5 m) clearance above and below. He had to fly at 60 knots, as going any slower would have made it potentially lose control under the bridge. Because camera operators refused to film the closeup of the scene, Cameron did it himself from a moving vehicle.

The tanker truck was storyboarded to crash through the steel mill gates and jackknife onto its side before sliding into the mill itself. Cameron attempted the jackknife live but was unable to get it to roll in the necessary spot, so the few moments of usable footage were combined with a miniature effect done by Fantasy II. The team measured and photographed the site, and the entrance to the mill was recreated on a 1/4 scale under the supervision of Jerry Pojawa. The finished miniature was about 60 by 20 metres (197 ft × 66 ft) and was up to 10 feet (3.0 m) tall in areas. It was built with a 2 feet (0.61 m) clearance underneath to allow operators to control things from below. The set had a steel substructure for strength while the buildings and items were made from hundreds of pieces of vacuum formed plastic, plus railings made with dowels and windows of acetate. It had to be large and reasonably detailed because some of the shots showed the whole location.

A 13-foot (4.0 m), 1/4 scale tanker truck was built, mainly by Monty and Dwight Schook, based on the live-action version. Monty carved the body from foam and it was vacuum formed out of 0.8 inches (2.0 cm) styrene. The cab had working suspension, steering, and lights as well as a full interior detailed by John Eaves. The tires had to be custom-made, with details to match the live-action versions, including treads. A single mold was made from which all the tires could be formed.

Four truck cabs were made: one for the rollover effect itself, and three with stronger lead tops for when it crashed into the mill. The tanks were made from PVC tubes capped on both ends. The first was rigged to tip over with hydraulics, while the second was a thicker tube cut in half lengthwise with a hinge and pneumatic actuator allowing it to split open to spill canisters filled with liquid nitrogen and alcohol.

Railroad tracks built into the live-action mill proved a convenient means of hiding the cable systems attached to the truck to trigger actions such as tipping over or jackknifing, although the most difficult aspect was lining its position up to match the live-action footage.

The T-800 climbing onto the side of the truck was a live-action stunt, while the miniature versions used a 14-inch (36 cm) tall T-800 sculpted by Dan Plant with a steel armature and radio controls for the T-800 pulling itself onto the truck as it rolled over. The radio controls were removed after and it was used as a standard go motion puppet for the following shots animated by Peter Kleinow, particularly the T-800 leaping off the truck and hitting the ground while rolling towards the camera. The puppet was suspended in midair, and a jump was animated and aligned to make it appear as if the figure was leaping from the truck to the ground. The puppet landed in blank space, so had to animate the motion of landing on the ground. The shot took two months and 25 takes to meet Cameron's approval.

=== T-800 bike jump ===
During the truck chase, the T-800 makes a jump on its motorbike, plummeting into the water channel below. The 750 pounds (340 kg) bike was required to jump about 60 feet (18 m) from 15 feet (4.6 m) in the air.

Stunt coordinator Joel Kramer included the bike jump as one of the more dangerous stunts in the film. The stunt was deemed too dangerous to attempt without some form of support, so a rig was built to carry both the bike and rider to the ground.

Although the bike was considered to be a Harley-Davidson, Gary Davis said that model was too heavy to perform the stunt and would not have survived the landing. During the 20 attempts at the stunt, Schwarzenegger's stand-in, Peter Kent, rode a look-alike bike while wearing a latex replica of Schwarzenegger's face, which took several hours to apply to his own every day. Kent had lied about having stunt experience to get the job.

Cameron believed in the digital process and so made no attempts to hide the bike's rig or wires, leaving Pacific Data Images to conceal about 1/8 of each frame, using a keyframe process and software that would interpolate whatever was on either side of the wire to hide them. Some hand fixes were needed as the software could not always discern what was happening due to the camera movement. Removing the wires against a sky background was considered easier than doing so against a background with trees. Additionally, Kent jerked forward when the bike landed, causing the wire to cross his face, which also had to be digitally painted out.

=== T-1000 truck ===
The truck chase scene was filmed over nine hours in late 1990 at an intersection in San Fernando Valley. The truck was required to drive up a pre-fabricated ramp through a false cinder block wall made from plaster at 60 miles per hour (97 km/h) and fall 30 feet (9.1 m) into a concrete flood control channel. Two smaller tow trucks were attached to the truck by an elaborate, slingshot-like pulley system. The tow trucks had to get up to 10 miles per hour (16 km/h), which would translate into 60 mph for the larger truck.

The crew was only permitted to film until noon that day, and failing to capture the stunt would have led to a 6-figure loss. Eight cameras were used to capture the stunt: four in the channel and four along and near the wall. A 300-foot (91 m) radius was cleared around the site. In the first attempt, the truck did not get to the necessary speed and veered away from the wall. The drag on the two trucks was too great. Gary Davis recalled dozens of unsolicited stuntmen stood around the cordon hoping to be called on. Cameron admitted it was expensive to do the stunt safely, but that he never intended for someone to be in the truck cab, as he would never ask someone to do something he would not do himself. 10 minutes before the permit ran out, the truck went through the wall.

The truck scene had to be modified in post-production because Cameron decided it would look better crashing from the opposite direction. Flipping the image was deemed simple, but this reversed a street sign in the image, so they had to isolate the sign from the rest of the footage. The technology was still relatively new, and the filmmakers were not sure it could be accomplished. However, it was relatively easy—they extracted the area of the sign and flipped it, but also had to offset it because the camera was moving, using software that could calculate the shift. A slight morph was added to the sign to distort it and blend it into the right perspective. There were a few frames where the truck passed the sign, and these had to be modified by hand. The flipping also moved the dummy driver to the wrong side, but instead of trying to move it, they darkened the windows to hide it completely.

== The "Future War" ==
The film's opening scene depicting the future war in 2029 was actually the last scene filmed. It was shot amidst the rubble-filled remnants of an abandoned steel mill in Fontana, California, measuring about 0.5 square miles. The location was further enhanced with vehicles brought to the location and set on fire, plus bikes and cars from a 1989 fire on the Universal Studios Lot, and the post-production addition of a Fantasy II miniature of a collapsed freeway. Cameron had conceived a much grander set-piece, but it was gradually scaled down during script rewrites, more after the final scripted version was storyboarded, and again after the effects shots were complete. Though he was fond of the setting, he determined that it was ultimately not important to spend too much time on it because none of the primary characters were featured. Plans to use a helicopter for lighting were changed because it was both time-consuming and noisy. Instead, Musco lights were used in combination with xenon lights mounted on 100 feet (30 m) cranes which appeared to be coming from Skynet's hovering ships.

Many of the visual effects for this were provided by Gene Warren Jr. and his company, Fantasy II Film Effects. Led by Michael Joyce, the model shop crew build a 1/6 scale miniature replica of the setting complete with a miniature overpass and cars, cinder blocks, exposed girds, and bricks cast out of Hydrocal (a hard plaster) and Pryocel (a softer plaster designed for easy breaking). Dirt was spread over it to enhance the look, and the miniature was surrounded by a 50-foot cyclorama depicting the night sky. Because the scene would require numerous composites of different footage, and each composite pass would reduce the image quality, high-resolution VistaVision cameras were used with an Eastmancolor film stock to start with as high an image quality as possible.

Fifteen separate miniature shots were required for ground and aerial combat, and three wide master establishing shots to provide scope. The initial opening shot of the future war was designed to emulate a previous shot of 1995 Los Angeles, contrasting the bustling roadways with scenes of skeletons and scorched cars. The scene was created as a 1/12 scale miniature, enhanced with a collapsed freeway and skyscrapers as well as smoke. The team found the most difficult part was the precise rotoscoping around the live-action footage of burnt-out cars to conceal the joining edges between it and the background miniature. For explosions to match the scale, they were filmed at 80 frames per second and pyrotechnics expert Joe Viskocil used black powder complimented with orange-gelled flashbulbs, while distant explosions used the flashbulb alone.

Most of the 46 shots in the "Future War" contained laser blasts from futuristic weaponry. Fantasy II emulated those from the original, creating a white "core" with a magenta glow, but this was changed to resemble tracer ammunition, receding as they moved until disappearing. Each blast had to be animated and then composited into the footage, alongside animated muzzle flashes, which was difficult because the footage was always in motion and the blasts had to pass in front of and behind objects in each scene. Because the live-action footage was filmed last, Fantasy II was forced to hire numerous rotoscope artists to work shifts throughout the day to meet the deadline.

=== The Terminators ===
Four Terminator T-800 endoskeletons were created for the film by the Stan Winston team, using the mold of the T-800 from The Terminator. Two were fully articulated, higher-quality ones controlled with cables and radio controls, and the other two were posable but non-articulated versions that could be shown in the background. The overall design was not changed, but where the original was built of epoxy and steel, weighing around 100 pounds (45 kg), the new version was made from a hybrid urethane resin reinforced with fiberglass cloth and a small amount of metal, making it closer to 50 pounds (23 kg). Machined parts were made out of aluminum to provide some additional strength as the lighter version was significantly more fragile than the original but easier to manipulate remotely. Even so, the original steel T-800 leg had to be attached to the lightweight puppet for its introductory scene because the lightweight version was not heavy enough to crush the wax-like material of the skull. The heavy leg was puppeteered by a rod attached to its knee, which was slid out as the camera panned up.

The rusted and damaged remains of a 1/3 scale (about 2-foot (0.61 m) tall) T-800 from The Terminator were cleaned and repaired for use as a background figure. Warren and puppeteer Peter Kleinow chose to use go motion to give it a more realistic motion when appearing behind the full-scale versions. It was filmed on a 1/3 scale set and controlled with a rod attached to its waist, which was carefully concealed with each movement. The miniature set had two relatively high-resolution rear-project screens positioned side by side on the left and right sides of the puppet. This created two VistaVision plates with a single walking endoskeleton. The full-scale versions were filmed with a similar two-screen approach and composited together with the miniatures, explosions, and other vehicles to create the final image. It took about 3 months to complete the effect.

=== The Hunter-Killers ===
Stephen Burg was tasked with designing Skynet's Hunter-Killer (HK) aircraft and tanks that were built by Fantasy II and composited into live-action footage of human soldiers. The HK aerial models were built in 1/6 scale and re-designed with more detail than in The Terminator. Seven radio-controlled models were built, two higher-quality functional ones and five others for crashing or being blown up. The design was sculpted in a dense foam from which rubber molds were made to form the final epoxy and fiberglass models. The models were detailed with a vacuum metalised metal surface, a rotating beacon, and taillights; the higher-quality models also had xenon searchlights.

For 12 frames of one aerial HK exploding, the spotlights were filmed separately against a black background and then composited onto the craft. Warren had intended to use motion control filming for some of the more difficult planned flying shots, but all of the movements were done with the aerial HKs mounted on wire rigs attached to a 16 feet (4.9 m) crane arm that could perform horizontal and vertical movements. During close-ups, the model hung still and smoke was used to make it appear to be in motion. Straight movements were performed with a cable and track. Warren's son Chris had a camera placed on his back while he was bent over to track around the model. The dark setting mostly concealed the wires except for one shot of an explosion occurring behind the aerial HK which necessitated the use of matte effects and compositing to hide.

All seven models were destroyed filming the downing of an HK because the concept kept changing. It was storyboarded to explode in mid-air, but Cameron decided he wanted it to crash first and then blow up. The models were filled with random model pieces for debris and fitted with six electronic explosive devices made from gas and black powder. The scene was precisely timed with triggers to make the craft fall at a specific spot before detonating. Because it was filmed at 48 frames per second, they had to make the craft move at 25 mph for it to look realistic.

The HK tanks were sculpted from the same dense foam as the aerial HKs and the finished models were cast in fiberglass, epoxy, and gelcoat. Compared to the static models of The Terminator, the updated versions had articulation throughout the torso, head, searchlights, and guns, and were given more intricate detailing. Two models were made: a higher-quality one weighing about 250 pounds (110 kg) with four motors, one for each tread (making it more mobile), and with lights and controller powered by a tether running from its back; and a second one for background shots, which had no motors and had to be pulled forward with monofilaments by puppeteers.

== Locations ==
=== The Cyberdyne building ===
The explosion of the Cyberdyne building was filmed at a disused office building in Fremont, California, over three to four weeks. The building was chosen because scouts couldn't find a location in the Los Angeles area that would allow for a low-flying helicopter. The area was lit with xenon lights on towers and the helicopter light. The explosion was practical and filmed with about 9 to 10 cameras plus one aboard the helicopter, and remote cameras inside cars for more dangerous shots, to fully cover it. It was led by pyrotechnician Tom Fisher. It was a difficult effect, requiring hundreds of gallons of gasoline to portray a giant fireball, and taking hours to rig completely.

The T-1000 jumping from his bike to a helicopter was accomplished by harnessing the rider, Bobby Brown, with a bungee cord rigged to pull him off at a certain point to land in a pile of cardboard boxes. The stunt and the helicopter were filmed separately and composited by Pacific Title. The effects company had to manually paint out the bungee cord from the scene, which was difficult because of all the surrounding broken glass and debris. The minigun used by the T-800 in the scene was a prop reused from Predator (1987).

=== Steel mill ===
The steel mill scenes were filmed at an abandoned steel mill in Fontana, California. Joe Nemec and his art department were tasked with a substantial renovation to make it appear operational, requiring them to build new platforms, add stairways, and construct a conveyor belt system, as well as two large replicas of the vats for holding molten steel, built from wood and plaster, with a fiberglass pour. It was impractical to film around molten steel, and so the visual effect had to be recreated, mainly with lighting provided by lighting consultant Richard Mula. Cameron wanted the pouring steel to be a brilliant white while giving off an orange glow, for which Mula procured prototype 0.5-inch-diameter and 12-inch-long 1500W T-3 tungsten lights. He added two banks of eight lamps in the middle of each fiberglass pour, and from a distance, they appeared to be a single, solid line, with orange fluorescent lamps on either side. Mula chose fluorescent over incandescent because of heat concerns, but even so, the heat was high enough that the lamps could only be on for a few minutes at a time, during which refrigerated air had to be constantly pumped into the pour. During one take, the cooled air was not switched on and the fiberglass caught fire and had to be remade.

The large vat in which both Terminators are destroyed was a clear, acrylic tub 3 feet (0.91 m) deep filled with water and translucent mineral oil, with about 39 lights around the edge. Underwater HMI lights were tested but the blue-white light they emitted required too many gels to make them orange. Mula augmented them with tungsten lights, about thirty Par 64s, and another twenty Par 336s. Mula devised the mixture in the vat. It was initially meant to be made from Methocel, but the slimy substance blocked almost all of the light. Milky water also did not work. Using mineral oil, they could color the oil and it would float on the surface. Still, the right mixture was needed to conceal the lights below the surface. The idea settled on was to mix powdered sugar into the oil to cloud it up. It was mixed in fifty-five-gallon drums because sometimes up to four hundred gallons of it were needed, as it took 100 gallons per inch to cover the surface of the pit. The approach became tedious however, and Mula eventually realized that he could mix air into it with a rubber hose, and the air bubbles would stay suspended in the oil for up to five hours, helping reflect light. This method was successful enough that the powdered sugar method was abandoned. To enhance the effect, heaters were placed beneath the camera to create a ripple effect of rising heat, sparks were added in the background, and some of the lights were on dimmers to allow them to simulate a flickering effect. These enhancements helped make the overall image believable; Greenberg said these effects were "not the sort of things the viewer should be paying attention to, but if I hadn't done them, they might miss it". It took six generators to power all the lights, which were also used as scene lighting.

For close-up shots of the pour, 4-Ward developed a 1/5 scale miniature steel mill set and filmed it at 24 frames per second using smoke, methodical, and neon tubes to simulate hot metal. The effect was similar to that used on the live-action set, but it was not practical to spill large amounts of liquid on the set, and the live-action setup could not depict the vats spilling. 4-Ward conceived of pouring white paint from a 1/4 scale miniature ladle and then separating the paint from the rest of the shot and optically modifying it to appear luminous.

== Visual effects ==
=== Time travel ===
Unlike in The Terminator, where time travel was concealed through the use of editing cuts, the T-800's time travel-assisted arrival in 1995 is shown in full. Live-action flashes and sparks were combined with rotoscoped effects developed by Fantasy II. They plotted where lighting effects were in each frame and filmed a Tesla coil emitting electricity against a black background, drawing the emissions to the necessary point in the frame. For the "time bubble", described as a sphere of energy, Fantasy II filmed down the length of a 10-inch (25 cm) plexiglass tube with lights and a pan of dry ice at the opposite end. It was filmed at six frames per second, which according to Warren created an "unusual effect". The accompanying black sphere was rotoscope animation, appearing in only 20 frames. The whole effect took about nine hours to complete and about 32 passes on the optical printer to composite. The team also had to create numerous mattes to blend their effect into the live-action billowing debris.

=== "Termovision" ===
The visual effect when viewing the T-800's perspective, dubbed "Termovision", was designed by Van Ling and produced by Video Image under project supervisor Richard Hollander. Initially scripted for eight shots but with more eventually added, Termovision provided a means of both adding to the story and revealing the T-800's internal reactions to events. Ling storyboarded each instance of the effect, comprising live-action footage overlaid with an information graphic. Ling scanned a few frames from each relevant scene and used Photoshop to add a red colorization and design the visual overlay, aiming to tell as much as possible without obscuring the image below. He emulated the same effect from The Terminator but added fictional abilities such as image enhancement and scanning or analyzing people and objects. His designs were provided to Video Image who produced the effect digitally.

Hollander was given interpositive footage which he transferred to the computer system with a high-resolution scanner. The resulting image contained about 1 million pixels, each assigned a numerical grayscale value from 0 for black to 255 for white. This allowed the data to be manipulated to keep the completely black and white pixels, and the intermediate tones being an equivalent shade of red. Once Cameron approved the colorization, Hollander's team overlaid the information graphics. Each resulting frame was saved as its own file before being printed onto film. For the T-800's scanning effect, Ling rotoscoped the scanning subject to give it a white outline for a couple of frames. To convey image enhancement, Video Image used high-resolution still frames and then applied a digital mosaic effect to lower its resolution. It was then played in reverse to appear as if the image was improving. The final use of Termovision, during the T-800's death, was difficult to accomplish digitally because it required static and image glitching. They developed a workaround by transferring the digital footage to video and recording it playing on a screen while deliberately manipulating the connections and wires.

== The nuclear explosion ==
=== Overview ===
To depict the destruction of Los Angeles by a nuclear attack, Cameron wanted it to be as "extreme" as possible while still being realistic, describing it as a "God-like dissection of the event". He said it was very expensive to accomplish, concluding "maybe I'm crazy. But we had to do it." Visual effects supervisors Robert Skotak and Elaine Edford led the development of the effect at 4-Ward, which was intended to utilize a combination of practical effects, miniatures, and minor CGI enhancements. Skotak said, "The nuclear war shots are physically brutal with massive amounts of light and energy... They are intended to make you actually feel the tremendous power and terror of nuclear war. The underlying message of the dream is: 'Here is an environment you are familiar with - here is what would happen to it in a few split instants. So beware." Robert Skotak and his brother, supervising director of photography Dennis Skotak, took influence from nuclear test footage as well as cinematic implementations in films such as Invasion U.S.A. and The Day After.

=== The blast ===
A miniature 8-foot (2.4 m) tall nuclear blast was crafted from a plexiglass column covered in layers of fiberfill and backlit. To create the illusion of upward movement, discrete wires moved the fiberfill around at different speeds. The blast peak was built by Joel Steiner from two large plexiglass discs rotated with pulleys, and a further four fiberfill-covered discs. Rotating gels rigged by Mark Shelton created a visual effect of moving fire.

4-ward also produced footage of a large-scale nuclear simulation, supervised by pyrotechnics expert Joe Viskocil.

=== Miniatures ===
Robert and Dennis Skotak photographed areas around Los Angeles as a reference for the miniature sets, selecting those that would be visually interesting to explode and enhancing these areas with further buildings, skyscrapers, and an overpass. After the initial blast imagery, the scene switches to a high-angle view of downtown Los Angeles. The live-action footage was taken on location in Los Angeles from the desired angle, and gradually transitioned to a painted matte of the same area destroyed. When the film crew went up into the hills around the city—the highest vantages they could find for the panoramic shot—they could not get the perspective Cameron wanted. Ultimately, they rented a traffic helicopter and had cameraman Tai Salamatti go up and shoot a series of test photos. They selected from his photos, and he went up again and shot a specific area on large format film to give them the angle and lighting conditions needed. A six-foot-wide print was made and retouched to fulfill the requirements. Rick Rische painted in some modifications because the lack of separation between some buildings made them seem like a wall. He then put an acetate overlay on it and, together with Richard Kilroy, made an elaborate matte painting of the area in ruins, with buildings stripped down and foundations in rubble.

A foreground 1/12 scale breakaway house, about 3 feet (0.91 m) wide and 18 inches (46 cm) tall, was built by model maker David Zen Mansley. The scale was chosen because it was easy to obtain model furniture at that scale. The model could be easily put back together for additional takes, and took up to five crewmembers a full day to set up and dress the shot. Once ready, the hilltop miniature set-piece was positioned on stage against a black background. Five high-powered air cannons and a fan were placed in the darkened matte area and the shot was photographed at high speed and then set aside for future compositing into the sequence.

Demolition tests were conducted on miniature breakaway skyscrapers about 10 in (25 cm) tall. One building was filmed in silhouette in front of a cityscape painting and destroyed, making it seemingly disappear in a flash of light. Although the tests provided the desired result, the idea of building up to forty buildings and destroying them was daunting for the team, so the Skotaks researched a less intensive approach using CGI. Jay Roth of Electric Image developed test footage using separate elements of collapsing buildings that were combined with a matte cityscape. Electric Image scanned an 8 in × 10 in (20 cm × 25 cm) transparency of the unblemished city, on which Jay and Allen Manning were able to build a three-dimensional half-mile circumference of the area digitally, using precise measurements taken from the city planner. A custom explosion program was built by Mark Granger and animator Markus Houy to simulate the nuclear blast effects on the model with controlled speed and gravity. The blast sweeping across the city from a distant, overhead view was accomplished physically with a curved blade that moved across the shot, covering the pre-blast image as the replacement moved in. Cameron was pleased with the effect, but he wanted to slow it down. There was not enough time to modify and re-render the effect, so optical supervisor Robert Costa devised a solution using the existing footage. This involved printing a series of partially exposed frames overlapping onto a single frame, likening the effect to performing constant dissolve transitions, fading in for three frames, fading out for three frames, and then rolling back four frames, making the footage twice as long but without duplicating any single frame.

Closeup shots used a scale replica of downtown Los Angeles, particularly the corner of Figuroa and 2nd street, using 1/16 scale buildings in the foreground and 1/35 scale in the background. Steve Brien and Ricc Ruskuski built the buildings using steel stock with pencil rods for a basic structure, onto which they cast hundreds of easily breakable resin girders. They struggled to identify an external building material that could support itself but would shatter apart easily for the explosion, eventually settling on pyrocel mixed with plaster, gypsnow, and vermiculite. The surface was laced with wires disguised as rebar to pull the buildings apart.

The buildings averaged 5 feet (1.5 m) tall. They contained hundreds of little destroyable rooms filled with soft plaster and balsa wood, even cornflakes and marzo crackers, anything that would break away and shatter. The backs of buildings also had to be detailed, because there was no way to tell what would be visible after the explosion. Originally, the buildings were planned to be positioned facing upwards to use natural gravity, but early tests indicated the disadvantages of rigging and lighting the scene from above outweighed the advantages. Instead they were built upright, and each facade was rigged with a dozen or more wire pulls attached to a squid release and connected to hundreds of pounds of sandbags. Joel Steiner and Joel Viskocil engineered these pulls and weight drops and trigged the backs of the buildings. Facing the buildings were ten air cannons, two ritter fans, two airlines, and an E fan. Moments after the cannons and fans were triggered, the sandbag releases would be tripped, and the buildings would be ripped backward. Timing was crucial since there was a delay between when the air cannons and fans were turned on and when the wall of air hit the buildings. Two gaffers, George Neil and Mark Shelton, managed the tremendous amount of light needed for the nuclear blast, sometimes jamming many hot lights into constricted areas.

Three cameras recorded the action at 120 frames per second and eight takes were needed to get the right results. Each successive take required a full rebuild, which took up to three days of rerigging and redressing. One refinement was to collapse the buildings in sequence from back to front (instead of simultaneously) by precisely triggering the air cannons and pulls via a computer board. Additional elements were added to enliven the wide-angle shot. An off-the-shelf 1/8 scale model car was filmed flying by the camera as a separate bluescreen element, while separate fire elements, primarily used in the foreground (such as fire on the pavement), were combined optically.

The park entailed the construction of dozens of miniature trees capable of bending and twisting violently. Designed and engineered by Joel Steiner, Michael Novotny, and Steve Sanders, the 1/6 scale miniatures were pulled over by a network of wires rigged at the side of the set. There was also a telephone pole in the foreground made partially out of tree bark.

A 1/8 scale model of a four-lane freeway—modeled on the Harbor Freeway at 2nd Street, with a sweeping overpass, ground vegetation, palm trees, and a cluster of office buildings—measuring 35 by 45 metres (115 ft × 148 ft) was crowded into one of the secondary 4-Ward stages. Steve Brien and Ricc Ruskuski engineered motor-driven pulley systems to move the model traffic using little hooks traveling through invisible slots in the roadway and connected to the undersides of the vehicles. To ensure the vehicles would break and bend convincingly, parts were scored, built with breakable materials, or replaced with thin, crushable metal sheets. Air cannons were positioned strategically to blow specific vehicles and signs off the road. The palm trees did not have enough surface area to be blown over and thus were rigged with wire pulls. Due to live-action changes, Cameron requested the entire shot be flipped to match the new direction of the nuclear blast. This was done by filming in front of a surface mirror and compensating for mirrored signs, road markings, and traffic flow. The shot was filmed at 60 frames per second, and took eight takes to get right, requiring extensive resetting and rebuilding in between each take.

The fireball was intended to be used for a sequence at the Cyberdyne building when Miles Dyson envisions the nuclear holocaust; however, this scene was cut and the effect was reused here. Viskocil, along with effects producer Elaine Edford and cameraman George Dodge, drove out to El Mirage dry lakebed in the Mojave Desert and set up 14 mortars in a 65-foot (20 m) diameter area. Viskocil said Cameron had requested thirty or forty gallons of gasoline, but knowing Cameron, he decided to double it. The fireball was set it off at ground level and spread out to about 85 feet (26 m) in diameter at the top and rose 250 feet (76 m) in the air; it was so big some residents called the police and fire departments. After a daytime test, a series of night blasts were detonated, each disrupted by 50 mph (80 km/h) winds. On the fourth high-speed take, a satisfactory image was achieved. The effect was shot at 160 frames per second.

=== Charred humans ===
4-Ward filmed live-action adult and child actors on a playground with VistaVision cameras at two different times of the day, hoping to obtain brightly lit footage earlier and shadowy footage later, which could then be combined to appear as if the area was struck by a sudden burst of light. However, the resulting footage was darker in the foreground while the skyline was still bright.

To make the sand to appear hot and scorched, optical manipulations were performed to lighten the foreground elements and darken the skyline, with the expertise of Dave Hewitt and Larry Alpin from Hollywood Optical Systems. The scene would then disappear in a white fade, but Cameron decided he wanted a more "kinetic" visual of white light in the sky moving toward the front of the scene, which was accomplished with rotoscoping.

The final segment of the scene shows the burnt, ashen humans being blown away by the shockwave while Sarah is set aflame and reduced to a skeleton. Three waist-up puppet recreations of Hamilton were constructed, based on scans by Cyberware because it would not be possible for Hamilton to maintain the necessary pained expression while a plaster lifecast was made. The scan data was used to create a Styrofoam bust that served as a basis for the puppets. The first puppet, depicting Sarah on fire, featured articulated arms on a ball-and-socket armature that were controlled by cables, an articulated jaw to show her screaming, and a stainless-steel flexible hydraulic hose in the neck to produce movement as the nuclear blast strikes. Puppeteer Richard Landon wore a Kevlar fire suit covered with fire gel while he manipulated the puppet as the area went up in flame. The next stage of the effect, depicting a charred Sarah, was accomplished by covering the puppet in flammable rubber cement that was remotely ignited with squib sparks. Its fingers were locked to the fence to prevent it from falling away. Like the first stage, this puppet had jaw articulation and an internal mechanism that snapped the head backward as the wires normally used could not survive the heat.

The final stage depicts ashen material exploding to reveal Sarah's skeleton. Shannon Shea was mainly responsible for the effect, researching, developing, and building it using a medical demonstration skeleton that was internally reinforced with a steel armature. The mold of Hamilton was lined with tissue paper and tempera paint that once dried produced a very fragile skin-like shell, which was placed over the skeleton and packed with shredded gray and black napkins. They scored the skin surface to make it as fragile as possible before hitting it with air mortars to blow the exterior away, leaving only the skeleton. A similar technique was also used for the charred but static humans on the playground, except for the model of an alternate Sarah holding her infant son, which used a more rigid polyfoam mixed with water to make it weak and crumbly.

== The T-800 ==
=== Modifying the T-800's CPU ===
For the theatrically deleted scene in which Sarah and John open the T-800's skull to modify its CPU, allowing it to learn, Cameron wanted the camera to be close to the actors while Sarah cut into the machine's flesh. A bust of Schwarzenegger was built in a specific pose with its head tilted down and looking into the mirror. A stock puppet would not have looked right because of the intricacies Schwarzenegger's facial expression. It was sculpted and built by Greg Figiel with a fiberglass core. Charles Lutkus was mainly responsible for modifying the head, making space for the eyes, making the jaw mobile, and building the CPU slot. Functioning elements such as eyes, eyebrows, and lips were radio-controlled while the main body was puppeteered through a hole in its back by holding a handle between its ears.

To create the illusion of cutting into Schwarzenegger's head, the scene began with a close-up of the puppet's head with the scalp pulled back and CPU revealed before the camera moved to look at a glassless mirror frame with Schwarzenegger sitting on the other side, emulating its movements. Even his makeup was applied in reverse to sell the mirror effect. Hamilton's twin sister, Leslie Hamilton Gearren, stood with Schwarzenegger, mirroring Hamilton's movements with the puppet. The garage set was also duplicated and mirrored on the opposite side, embellished with small items such as nails and soda cans to enhance the realism.

=== Revealing the T-800 arm ===
Figiel also sculpted the T-800's false arm for the scene where it cuts away its forearm flesh to reveal the robot hand beneath. Built from foam rubber, it included a false shoulder, bicep, and forearm based on Schwarzenegger's measurements and sculpted over the metal arm built by Charles Lutkus, giving in an accurate fit. Karen Mason stitched a tight spandex understructure which was set into the foam core during construction, making it very durable. Because the foam was only about 1/8 inch thick, without the understructure it would have torn to pieces when pulled away. This also made it reusable. The forearm flesh was pre-cut and then disguised with flesh-tone paint, and the metal hand was covered in fake blood and lubricant before the skin was pulled over it. Schwarzenegger then ran his knife along the pre-cut lines and pulled the skin away. The metal arm, also used for some shots in the "Future War" sequence, was built with realistic and individually articulated fingers because Winston was disappointed that the one built for The Terminator could only operate all of its fingers simultaneously.

=== T-800 damage prosthetics ===
The gradual deterioration of the T-800 as it is damaged was one of Winston's earliest concerns. Seven different visual stages were discussed, but these were refined to just three: the first is the undamaged Terminator, the second showing parts of the metal endoskeleton underneath parts of the forehead and cheeks, and the third showing more of the underlying metal structure in the face and body, as well as a mechanical eye and metallic chest plate. Compared to just three days on The Terminator, this third stage had to be applied for about 30 separate days of filming, taking about five hours to apply each time and another hour to remove. Make-up artist Jeff Dawn said Schwarzenegger was patient each time. The effect was realistic enough to scare Schwarzenegger's young daughter when she visited him on set. Full body casts were made of Schwarzenegger to aid in crafting the makeup applications.

Leading to the second stage, when the T-800 is shot in the face by the SWAT team assaulting Cyberdyne, Winston's crew built a life-size puppet of Schwarzenegger's upper torso that would be combined with live-action footage. Thirty squib charges were applied to the side of its face to depict gunfire. Its facial features were radio-controlled. To simulate a realistic walk, the puppet was fitted with a flexible steel spine built by Brock Winkless. The puppet was mounted on a walking rig inspired by Jim Henson's puppeteering technique, which was worn over the operator's shoulders so that its walking movements would transfer to the puppet. The harness was built from a Steadicam 3a vest with added aluminum mounting points on the lower back and stomach. An aluminum boom arm was fitted to the vest pointed straight out and resting on a swivel wheel on which the puppet sat. In between the puppet and the boom arm was a bobbing device that made it rise and lower. Shane Mahan wore the rig and controlled the arm motion with two rods attached at the elbows. Three additional operators used cable controls to manage other articulations including the hips and shoulders. Schwarzenegger's walk was studied to better replicate it.

When the T-800's metal arm becomes trapped in a steel mill gear, the arm was built deliberately fragile and attached to a wire that pulled it into the gear. Mahan built a more fragile version held together with aluminum tape for the following scene in which the T-800 snaps the arm to free itself. For subsequent scenes, Schwarzenegger was fitted with a severed robotic arm which had to be slightly puppeteered via a thin wire from above by Mahan because the T-800 would still be able to move it regardless of the damage. When the T-1000 seemingly kills the T-800 by spearing it through its torso, the camera angle concealed the steel rod going through another puppet. It featured radio-controlled legs to make it appear to be crawling, while the arms were controlled with rods. The head contained 19 servo motors to power the different facial articulations.

=== T-800 death ===
The T-800's death in the molten vat of steel was intended to feature a practical fire element but a suitable solution could not be found. Instead, Fantasy II produced about six layers of fire elements that could be composited into the scene optically. This was filmed using one of the Winston crew's full-size T-800 puppets and matched its movements to the live-action footage of Schwarzenegger being lowered into the vat. The puppet was painted black and filmed with fire moving up it.

== The T-1000 ==
=== Initial design and development ===
Cameron had first conceived of a character like the T-1000 for The Terminator but lacked the budget or technology to realize it at the time. He first came close to the concept with the implementation of the "water snake" in The Abyss, a fully CGI character that could take on a vaguely humanoid shape, which was composited into live-action footage through analog techniques as available digital resolutions were not yet sufficient. "Let's shoot for the first computer-generated man." However, compared to The Abyss, where the CGI character could have been cut entirely, there was no backup plan if the CGI work for Terminator 2 failed or mismatched Winston's practical effects.

The digital rendering of the T-1000's shapeshifting liquid-metal form was enabled by sophisticated computers made by Silicon Graphics Inc. which cost tens of thousands of dollars. Detailed storyboards revealed that the T-1000 would require a range of unusual illusions that could only be achieved through computer animation and digital manipulation—combined with the practical effects of Winston's makeup team—which were entirely dependent on ILM's ability to render CGI of unprecedented complexity. The character required about 52 different effect shots.

Cameron chose the T-1000 to have a mercury-like aesthetic when not in its human form because, as Warren Jr. described, "Mercury doesn't look real in real life. It balls up, it reflects everything—it looks like a digital-created thing." Cameron contacted Dennis Muren at ILM to determine if the water character from The Abyss could be made metallic, and move and morph in a humanoid form. Muren had some ideas for how to realize it based on the CGI figures he had seen in TV commercials and in university research. Muren said that the reflective surface was also a simpler solution than creating realistic CGI skin; the real difficulty lay in making it move while reflective. Cameron had seen various modern computer techniques that could create a chrome-like effect but not while changing shape or conveying a real, physical weight when combined with live-action footage. Cameron wanted it to be very reflective. Muren modified the reflections to make them seem heavier. Diana Ace and Alice Rosen worked full time on digital reflections, using a Macintosh to touch up reflections (mainly on the T-1000) and create blends between walls, floors, and ceilings to ensure there were no seams or hard edges.

Muren described the T-1000's initial design as "terrible"—Cameron wanted it to have a flawless surface, but Muren believed this would make it look unrealistic. Muren's solution was to make the surface not entirely reflective and scatter light in almost imperceptible ways to make it slightly "dirty" and better fit the live-action footage. To create the right look for the shiny metal material, a sophisticated shading program called the "poly-alloy shader" was developed, which produced a reflective, slightly cold, silvery visual and gave the material its chrome-like appearance.

Animator Steve Williams studied Patrick's gait, and realized how difficult it would be to make a fully CGI person due to the nuances of movement based on weight and inertia. To precisely analyze his gait, Williams filmed him walking and running, using a flexible grid on the actor's body to determine how his muscles interacted. Using a dual camera technique created by Mark Dippe, cameras synchronized to show each angle of Patrick; the resulting footage was studied for a month and formed the basis for the character's CGI models and walking cycles. Scanned at the Cyberware Laboratory in Monterey, the footage couldn't be used directly, but served as a basic starting shape and guide for modeling the chrome figure, rather than replicating it from scratch. Kassar said Patrick's performance was essential to making the T-1000 real, with or without the effects.

The CGI effect shots were scheduled at the beginning of production, to allow the longest development time. The ILM computer graphics department was divided into six teams supervised, respectively, by Jay Riddle, Doug Smythe, Lincoln Hu, Scott Anderson, Tom Williams, and Stefen Fangmeier, and George Joblove. Muren and his team adapted the storyboards based on the realistic demands of computer graphics, as they were not sure some shots were achievable, especially those that featured camera movement. They suggested compromises with Cameron's approval. Chiang then redrew all 43 CGI-shot storyboards, being as specific as possible to avoid delays later on. The storyboards were used in small animation tests to have an idea of timings and actions to reduce trial and error.

Chiang also defined the distinct looks of the T-1000 in all four of its CGI states (separate from its human form). Stage One is an amorphous blob of liquid metal, Stage Two is a humanoid but featureless shape, Stage Three takes a vague shape of Patrick with some gear visible, and Stage Four is effectively a CGI chrome replica of Patrick. Segal sculpted several 18-inch clay maquettes for each phase which proved invaluable in studying how the character should look at each stage and the transition between each one. Chiang also experimented with using hand animation for transitions between the chrome and live-action versions of Patrick. According to Muren, the most challenging aspects were the practical effects that involved splitting its body open, transforming appendages into blades, and other substantial physical damage.

For budget reasons, Cameron assigned as many T-1000 effects as possible to Winston's makeup team to avoid costly computer graphics. These practical effects included practical bullet hits, full-sized puppets, and metallic blade extensions. Much of the early research and development involved finding ways to convincingly suggest the look of liquid metal in sculpted form, such as the process of vacuum metalizing. The difficulty lay in finding materials that would hold the vacuum metalizing without cracking or flaking, with the best results coming from a slip rubber latex backed with either soft foam rubber or polyfoam.

=== Bullet wounds ===
The T-1000 bullet wounds were among the earliest effects developed by the Winston crew. The team spent weeks shooting pellets into mud to study the resulting patterns and duplicate them. They also spent a lot of time testing materials to see which would best take to the vacuum metalizing process that would give all the effects their chrome look. They experimented by carving dozens of latex and foam pieces to look like a ripple through liquid metal in various states and sizes, which were then vacuum metalized, creating a final appearance akin to a chrome flower.

They struggled with a deployment mechanism for the pieces so they would appear in an instant, simulating bullet impact. Winston described it as a "bear trap mechanism" that snapped open, but Cameron wanted something "more elegant". Mechanic Chris Cowan engineered a system in which the chrome flower was divided into five pieces, each of which was stuck to a spring-loaded finger mechanism that would explode outward from the center. These pieces were attached to a fiberglass chest plate worn by Patrick, and holes were pre-scored into his uniform to let the flowers spring through. Each flower was activated with a radio-controlled cable pin mechanism that would release all five fingers simultaneously. To make the effect happen instantaneously, they used very strong springs, but this made it difficult to keep the devices closed and several takes were ruined by them activating unexpectedly.

CGI was used to animate the impact holes closing. Because of the expense of using this process to deal with the many bullet impacts received by the T-1000, a cost-saving measure was implemented in which the bullet holes would not heal immediately so that all of the impacts could be removed in one shot. For example, in the mall confrontation, the T-1000 is shot six times by the T-800, but heals all of its injuries in a single shot instead of six separate ones.

Live-action footage of the bullet wounds was scanned into computers and initial modeling and animation were performed using Autodesk Alias. A computer model recreation of Patrick was developed and Jonathan French animated the modeled hits closing up. The effect was enhanced with a custom-made program designed to add a rippling effect to the wounds and surrounding clothing, and the poly-alloy shader. The finished footage was then composited digitally into the high-resolution background footage and onto film.

=== T-1000 truck chase ===
The scene of the T-1000 chasing down John Connor in a truck was one of Patrick's earliest filmed scenes. Patrick was filmed walking out of the flaming truck using a motion control system to allow for a smooth consistent movement, but the camera could not be completely synchronized with his movements and so the camera was manually operated after rehearsing the movements with Patrick about 20 times. The cameraman's resulting movements were preserved with a field recording so the camera could exactly recreate its movements without Patrick for the background plate that would be used to digitally insert the T-1000. For the final shot, Patrick had to start his movement as close to the flames as possible, but on one take was too close. He said, "I felt this intense heat and I could smell my shirt beginning to singe—and the back of my ears were stinging." Though he began the scene calmly, he began moving too fast as the heat became overwhelming, leading to Cameron stating, "Robert, I appreciate your dedication, but I think you overdid it. Don't run in so far next time." A second camera filmed Patrick from the side to make it easier for the T-1000 animators to see his movements and stride clearly.

Animating the T-1000 walking from the fire took several weeks and was one of the more difficult shots in the film to produce, but Cameron believed it was essential in demonstrating his invulnerability. Storyboards called for the T-1000 to progress through each of its visual stages as it emerged from the fire, and Williams was responsible for developing all four stages used. Animation began with basic wire-frame models to form a digital puppet. Williams remarked that he made several hundred changes per day refining slight physical movements in the head, wrist, or hips to make them more realistic. A custom software, "Body Sock", smoothed the T-1000 joints and connected all of its components together to create smooth, seamless skin.

To give the T-1000 its reflective appearance, panoramic photographs were taken on location of the surroundings which were scanned into a Macintosh FX computer and integrated into the digital puppet's world for it to reflect. They also added reflections of the T-1000 to the water in the canal. Detailed measurements were made of the canal to marry its movements to the environment; still, the digital character did not line up seamlessly due to the various camera movements and errors that had been made recording its movements. Also, the canal floor was uneven which made it even more difficult. They attempted to alleviate the issue somewhat through hand-painted alterations to the footage and the morphing technique developed by ILM for Willow, which alters two-dimensional imagery by stretching two separated images to create an intermediate one. To transition between its different forms, software called "Model Interp" was used, which could keyframe transition between two 3D shapes. Transitioning to his fourth form as a police officer, a wipe transition was used to move from the chrome 3D model to Patrick's live-action footage.

=== John's foster parents ===
The scene in which the T-1000 impersonates John's mother Janelle Voight (Jenette Goldstein) and kills her husband Todd (Xander Berkley) by stabbing him through the mouth was the first scene filmed. The scene was accomplished using a mixture of CGI and practical effects. The Winston crew had thought the effect would be among the film's easiest to accomplish, but it ended up being one of the more difficult due to the practicalities of building a blade-arm blended into Goldstein's shoulder. In particular, when the sculpted arms were vacuum metalized, every flaw and imperfection in its surface became obvious. They eventually determined that the arm would need to be machined to create a better product. Even so, the machined versions still had flaws and seams that made painting the transition from the metallic blade to the human skin difficult; it required many revisions to achieve the right result.

Different sword arms were made based on a cast of Goldstein's arm. The Winston crew developed a bladed arm, made from ABS plastic and fiberglass, that was attached at Goldstein's shoulder while she held her own arm behind her back. It was flesh-toned at the top and gradually transitioned into a chrome blade. It was designed to be thin enough to contain a human arm to enhance the effect. One version was straight with a handle on the arm-end, allowing puppeteers to manipulate it during a full pan of the blade off-camera when it is pulled out of Berkley's mouth. A separate version of the bladed arm was made with a bent elbow for the subsequent shot where the T-1000/Janelle pivots the arm while observing it transforming back into a normal arm. CGI was used to transition the blade back to a human arm. Goldstein mimed looking at the transition taking place before her, but the arm was actually filmed later against a bluescreen using a different actress, as this was deemed easier than digitally manipulating Goldstein's arm in the scene itself. Model Interp helped with the transition, and the effect was enhanced by adding reflections of Goldstein to the blade. Goldstein was assisted by a puppeteer positioned behind her, who wore a black shroud and appeared in some of the shots between her legs. Doug Chiang used Photoshop to replace the puppeteer with a clean plate shot for this purpose.

Once slain, Berkley would fall to the ground, a position he had to remain in for up to five hours until nearly 4 AM to maintain continuity in the following shots. Berkley remarked that he struggled to walk for a few days afterward, but Cameron rewarded him with a bottle of Cristal. Berkley had to practice sword swallowing techniques with a dulled blade for two weeks beforehand, and a cast was made of his head to develop a retractable blade attached to the unseen side of his face that would quickly snap to the side, appearing to be sliding into the back of his head. The blade tip attached to the side of Berkley's head clipped over his ear and a shoulder harness. A track bent around the off-camera side of his head on which the blade tip rode. Berkley had to lean back at an uncomfortable angle to appear as if his head had been forcibly thrust back. When the spike in his mouth was pulled back, the rig was retracted, traveling at a 45-degree angle and appearing to be retracted into the back of his head.

Goldstein rehearsed the scene with Patrick to better imitate his physicality. After this, the T-1000/Janelle transitions into the Number Two version of the T-1000 before reassuming Patrick's appearance. The effect was one of the most complex transitions because it involved sequentially morphing between multiple actors and CGI models.

=== The hospital ===
For the scene of the T-1000 emerging from its concealment on the hospital floor, the shot used an untested software written by Tom Williams called "Make Sticky", which could reshape selected areas of a 2D image using 3D geometry to give it depth. A computer-generated replica of the floor was matched to the live-action footage, and Make Sticky kept it static while Liza Keith's animated T-1000 head began to take shape and move up through it. A separate custom software, "Ray Samp", was used to link the digital floor and animated head, smoothing how the floor moved around the head. A following reverse angle shot—from behind the T-1000 and showing the hospital guard Lewis (portrayed by Dan Stanton) in the background—revealed the edges of the T-1000 separating from the floor as it took a more humanoid shape. For this shot, animated by Rich Cohen, the live-action floor was completely replaced with CGI, and the hallway was digitally widened at Cameron's request.

The rising animation initially appeared too mechanical, so subtle motions were added (such as making it turn its head) to make it appear more natural. Stanton's face was scanned at Cyberware to create an accurate model for the liquid T-1000 replica, while the body of the digital Number Four Patrick was remodeled by animator Alex Seiden to resemble Stanton based on reference photos. As the scene continues, the Lewis/T-1000 confronts and kills Lewis by thrusting a spiked finger through his eye. Chiang used Photoshop to paint the finger transforming into a spike, while the Winston crew provided practical applications. A long and medium-length spike was produced to create a visual impression of it changing size. Jon Price built a puppet of Stanton from the shoulder up to portray the blade actually sticking into his eye. It featured cable- and radio-controlled facial movements operated by five people. Because the area penetrated by the spike was where eye controls would normally go, Price developed a separate system that attached to the puppet's temples instead.

To portray the T-1000 passing through metal bars, two plates were shot, one with the bars in place and one without them as Patrick walked through. A match-modeling technique was used to build a computer model of Patrick's footage which was combined with Make Sticky to make it stick wherever it intersected with the bars. Although they completed most of the effect using this technique, it was further enhanced with hand-painting by Chiang.

For the following scene of the T-1000 using its blade arms to pry open an elevator door, only the elevator opening was filmed, the rest was CGI. The T-800 responds by shooting the T-1000 in the face, exploding its head. Referred to as the "Splash Head", the effect involved two articulated puppets and an appliance worn by Patrick's stunt double. The first puppet was designed to portray the T-1000's head splitting open and was modeled from a clay lifecast of Patrick. The puppet was mainly constructed from foam rubber, apart from the split parts that were made from EST-50, a strong, lightweight, flexible urethane. The head was prepared and held together with a retaining cable that could be quickly released, and the seam was concealed in the puppet's hairline as the first effect was shown from the back. For the frontal effect, a more detailed puppet was made with hinges under each ear and a lopsided mechanism that allowed the eyes to be operated independently of each other. The puppet contained pulleys that allowed the two halves to be pulled close to show the T-1000 beginning to heal. To complete the effect, Patrick's stunt double had to hold his head back as far as he could and use a modified snorkel to breathe while an appliance was worn on his upper body. This allowed him to portray the T-1000 staggering backward as it heals. John Nelson animated the CGI closure of the T-1000's head, compositing it with live-action footage, aided by "Chan Math", a program designed to "sew" the seams of the split face by identifying a start and stop point, avoiding having to animate it manually. Cameron was unimpressed by early efforts of the head closure, believing it looked more magical than scientific, so they added effects such as a camera shake and manipulated the image quality.

Cohen also animated the next scene of the T-1000 pouring itself through an elevator roof, which was made difficult due to the flashing and moving lights in the environment. He scripted software that would analyze the image to identify the intensity and color of the lights to adjust the digital T-1000's reflections. Cohen further animated the blob T-1000 turning into the Number Two form and then back into the live-action Patrick. He used footage of Patrick running from different angles to match his stride to the mode. A dummy was used to show the T-1000 latching itself onto the car as Sarah, John, and the T-800 escape. Molding its arms into crowbars, the trunk was prescored to allow the prosthetics to pierce it. Developed by the Winston crew, they wanted the crowbar arms to look too thin to have human arms inside them so two different versions were used, one for a top-down view and the other for a side view which would show the thinner parts. The final aspect of this setpiece, the blob of liquid metal rejoining the T-1000, was thought to be easy, but animator Annabella Serra struggled to account for lighting, shadows, reflections, and geometry in the scene.

=== The helicopter takeover ===
The effect of the T-1000 pouring itself through a hole in the helicopter windscreen used an updated version of the "Pseudopod" software used for the water creature in The Abyss. Joe Pasquale and Rich Cohen had to adapt it to seem heavy and dense like metal instead of water, as early tests made it look like the T-1000 "hopped" into the seat in the tin-can-like shape. They also photographed the helicopter interior to add reflections. Once inside the vehicle, the T-1000 assumes its Fourth Chrome Form and tells the pilot to "get out". This is the character's only spoken dialogue when not in a human form. To get the correct mouth movements, Patrick was again scanned at Cyberware as he held an expression after uttering each syllable, such as "Ge-" then "-t". This did not work however because Patrick's facial positions would shift over time. A workaround was developed by using two slide projectors to project grids on his face and black dots were drawn on the grid edges so they could realign his face into the right position. Even so, there were issues with the T-1000's sunglasses moving around inconsistently. Michael Natkin developed a technique to only animate the lower portion of the T-1000's face. Jay Riddler animated this scene.

=== Frozen, shattered, and reformed ===
In the steel mill, exposed to nitrogen, the T-1000 freezes before being shot by the T-800 and shattering. Cameron specifically wanted the freezing aspect to gradually move over the T-1000's body without being animated. Shane Mahan, Jeff Dawn, Steve LaPorte, and Ed French experimented with different methods of achieving a frosted appearance. Dawn located prismatic snow tinsel which he broke apart to create confetti-like slivers that were applied a few inches at a time with an aerosol adhesive to Patrick from his feet up. The complete effect from beginning to end was filmed over five nights.

To portray the T-1000's legs snapping off at the knees, the production recruited Larry Johnson, whose legs had been partially amputated. Prosthetic limbs were placed into a pair of urethane boots, segmented into multiple pieces, and a cable device was run through each piece to hold them together, allowing them to be separated from Johnson on cue. When the character subsequently loses his arm, Patrick wore a jacket fitted with a cable-controlled false arm that is connected to a false hand positioned on the floor. Patrick leaned on the arm and hand to conceal the seam and then as he knelt up, the pieces would disconnect. As the T-1000 completely freezes, Patrick was photographed in a specific pose with his real legs concealed in a false floor to appear to be standing on stumps. Using the reference photo, a puppet replica was built using a silicon mold to create a thin gel-coat resin model that could be filled with shiny metal flakes and nearly 300 vacuum metalized shards. The model was wrapped in an explosive primary cord. Cameron specifically wanted it to shatter like broken glass and fall to the ground rather than explode, sending pieces in various directions, so three air mortar cannons were positioned above it to ensure the pieces fell flat.

The final part of the scene depicts the T-1000 reconstituting itself by merging its liquid metal parts together. It begins with the shards melting to form a liquid. Freezing mercury was the first consideration by pouring mercury into dry ice, but the result had frost on the surface and turned it white. They also experimented with lead solder melting in a clay mold but could not get it to melt fast enough and it tended to blacken, not creating the right effect. They eventually used serabin, a lead-like material used as a ballast for model railroad cars, and looked like chrome when buffed. They carved shards out of it and placed them on a Coleman Stove with propane torches above and shot them undercranked as they melted.

To depict the melted pieces coalescing, the Skotaks used globules of mercury. This was not the first choice due to its toxicity, but other options such as lead solder, wax, and silver paint failed to create the necessary effect. They had to wear protective gear while manipulating the difficult-to-control mercury, and after two days of struggles, they used a spray adhesive to make it more controllable. To make the pieces come together, the mercury was placed on a 3 feet (0.91 m) long table built with a small turnbuckle that allowed the center to be pulled down subtly, causing the droplets to flow inwards towards the center, alongside airlines to move them in the desired direction. This was composited into live-action footage of the mill.

The final phase of the effect, showing the puddle forming back into the T-1000 humanoid form, was supervised by Jay Riddle. Annabella Serra animated an overhead view of the poly-alloy figure forming. This was scripted to be a static shot but the camera was moved to give the scene some emphasis. Joe Pasquale animated the blob shape transforming to Number Four, and Alex Seiden developed another version of the poly-alloy shader to allow some of the shadows to creep along the floor to make it more believable.

In a battle between the Terminators, the T-800 punches through the T-1000's head, which transforms to make its former head its hands. Riddle described this as the most challenging scene because it was live-action interaction with CGI. The T-1000's head was animated to stretch over the T-800's fist, and they struggled with demonstrating the resistance and weight of the dense liquid metal as well as matching its movements up to that of the T-800 moving its fist. Similarly, they had to imagine what the CGI T-1000 would look like as it throws the T-800 around. Doug Smyth supervised the effect of the T-1000 passing through itself, and John Berton spent about two weeks animating it. Patrick performed several takes running at the wall but it was difficult to line him up exactly for the reverse shot, so they used a cross dissolve in the area of both images that concealed the difference.

Deleted scenes showing the T-1000 glitching after being frozen featured extra effects. For instance, a flexible arm made of urethane was built by the Winston crew and painted with yellow and black stripes to show the T-1000 inadvertently merging with environmental objects. ILM produced a separate effect of its boots matching the patterned floor with each step using a wipe effect. These scenes were cut for pacing because the T-1000 kept stopping to look at the glitches.

=== "Donut head", "Cleave man", and "Pretzel man" ===
Further into the steel mill, Sarah shoots the T-1000 in the head, creating a gaping hole. This was achieved with a mechanical head and shoulders replica of Patrick. It featured radio-controlled eye articulation and jaw movements and a cable mechanism on the perimeter of the hole to begin the closing action. The closure was achieved with CGI, including a rippling technique. The T-1000 responds by pinning Sarah to a wall with his spiked finger. Due to the quickness of the scene, they opted for a simple technique, giving Patrick a spiked finger worn like a glove which was jammed into Hamilton's shoulder, protected by a fiberglass piece while another piece was placed on her back, all held in place with metal struts to hold both parts of the finger in place.

The T-800 intervenes, slicing the T-1000 in two with a piece of rebar. Although Winston had anticipated using a complete puppet for the "Cleave man", because Cameron was willing to film the shot from a static angle instead of moving, they opted for a simpler approach. Mahan made drawings from which he developed a maquette sculpture showing a body with one shoulder arched back as far as possible with the head facing forward, creating a gap that could be built on. Chris Swift constructed a false arm, shoulder, and partial torso down to the hip from foam rubber that could be worn by Patrick. They also made a rubber costume for him to wear because they found the painted rubber did not mesh well with the cloth uniform. Patrick wore the outfit like a suit, and when viewed from the correct angle, he appeared to be standing normally until Schwarzenegger split the outfit with the rebar, causing it to spring open. The rebar was then attached to Patrick by a hoop worn around his torso which was painted out with Photoshop; the wound was then closed using CGI.

The T-1000 later impersonates Sarah to lure out John. Hamilton's twin sister portrayed Sarah in this scene while Hamilton portrayed her T-1000 impersonation. This scene features the only direct transformation of the T-1000 into another character without using an intermediary chrome form as it switches from Hamilton to Patrick. This was achieved with a morphing effect, but it was difficult to match both actors' movements and extract them from the mill background. Around three weeks were spent developing a background shot that could last for the duration of the shot, which needed to be color-corrected to match the individual footage of Hamilton and Patrick.

Finally, the T-800 shoots the T-1000 with a grenade launcher, causing its torso to explode. Chris Swift and Andy Schoneberg sculpted three full-sized "Pretzel man" puppets. One was made of foam rubber sculpted in an "exploded" view that could fold into itself to create a mostly humanoid shape, made by Evan Brainard. Once folded, it was held together with trip pins and springs, and the seam was concealed with aspects such as smoke. A pneumatic ram was installed to force the head upward as the body sprang open. The second puppet required more articulation and was built and mechanized by Brainard. It was affixed to the ground on two gimbals, and a puppeteering rod ran down its leg, letting puppeteers below control the body. The head featured radio-controlled jaw and eye movement and cables controlled the head. The third and final puppet had no articulation; it was a simple foam puppet with a 35-pound weight inside to make it fall faster.

=== Death ===
The T-1000 meets its end falling into a vat of molten steel. Warren Jr. said "it looks a little cartoony", but they were unable to improve it in time for the film's release and the animators struggled to animate it without being based on the movements of an actual person in the scene. Muren lamented not having more time on the effect, saying the team used "every cheat we could think of" and eventually settled for 1,000 lines instead of 2,000 just to get it rendered on time. Even so, it took weeks to render the scene, using render farms at Silicon Graphics, universities including Caltech, and any other facilities they were able to work with.

Unlike the other heavily storyboarded transformations, ILM was given more leeway in how the effect would look. They had to deal with the highly reflective character among brightly lit areas. Chiang developed some key frame concept art showing the dissipation of the T-1000 and how its shiny chrome surface would gradually dull as it melted. The effect was mainly achieved with a series of morph effects combining live-action and CGI characters.

The actors involved (Lewis, Goldstein, Patrick) were given specific choreography and were filmed moving about in the live-action pit at the mill side. ILM also constructed a miniature version of the vat to film the liquid splashing so it could be composited over the CGI characters. The sequence involved around thirty separate shots all composited together, and a camera move was digitally added to make it appear more dynamic.

== 3D conversion ==
Cameron oversaw the year-long 3D remaster and subsequent 2017 theatrical release of Terminator 2 in August 2017. Cameron said, "if you've never seen it, that'll be the version you want to see and remember." The 3D remaster's theatrical release was seen as a disappointment, earning about $562,000 in its debut across 386 theaters, compared to the 3D re-release of Cameron's Titanic ($17 million) in 2012.

Prior to the conversion, Deluxe Entertainment Services Group's restoration team scanned the original film negative at 4k resolution on a custom wet-transfer film gate which submerged the film in liquid to conceal superficial scratches, and they also removed dirt and performed necessary repairs to fully restore the film to its original condition. Cameron's colorist Skip Kimball calibrated the coloring based on the best quality film from Terminator 2's original release. Cameron also took the opportunity to make minor digital modifications, such as reinserting the windshield glass that fell out when the T-1000's truck fell into the flood channel in the early chase. He also concealed the obvious use of a stuntman for Furlong and Schwarzenegger during the same chase and Patrick's nudity during his introductory scene, as well as brightening the overall visuals.

The 3D conversion required extensive rotoscoping by Stereo D (also part of Deluxe) and took 1,800 artists about 8 months to complete. The studio used its proprietary software to generate depth maps for the rotoscoped shapes to achieve an accurate orientation and angle, and had to digitally paint out visual artifacts created in the process. The team struggled with film grain in scenes such as the steel mill because of the bright colors, and miniature effects such as the nuclear blast because of the differences in scale.
