= California Steel Industries =

American steel company

- Company type: Private
- Industry: Steelmaking
- Headquarters: Unincorporated San Bernardino County, California, near Fontana, California
- Products: Steel
- Owner: Nucor and JFE Holdings
- Website: www.californiasteel.com

California Steel Industries is a steel processing and finishing company that operates a facility near Fontana, California.

The Fontana plant was built in 1942 by Kaiser Steel, which operated it until December 1983, when it was shuttered as part of the general termination of Kaiser's steel business. The site and plant were briefly owned by an investor group that purchased much of Kaiser's assets before they were sold to a Kaiser creditor, Brazilian firm Companhia Vale do Rio Doce (now Vale), which created California Steel as a joint venture with Kawasaki Steel (now JFE Holdings). California Steel paid about $120 million for the facility, and Vale do Rio Doce forgave its debt to Kaiser as part of the transaction.

California Steel reopened part of the Fontana plant to process imported steel slabs into finished products such as rolled steel, while the manufacturing equipment for producing raw steel remained idle. At its founding, California Steel operated on about 400 acres of the Fontana site, leaving 1,400 acres idle, and employed 700 people, less than a tenth of the 10,000 that worked at the plant during Kaiser ownership. In 1994, California Steel sold the remaining steel manufacturing infrastructure to Chinese company Shougang, which rebuilt it in southern China as one of that country's most advanced steel mills.

By the end of the 1990s, California Steel had become the largest buyer of unprocessed steel slabs in the world and was profitable, with income of $119 million on revenue of $700 million. Its workforce had grown to about 950, and it imported steel from Mexico, Australia, Russia, China, and South Africa, as well as domestic purchases, and produced about 2 million tons of finished product annually.

Lower demand for steel during the Great Recession caused the company's production to decrease to a low of 800,000 tons in 2009 before it began to recover the following year. In 2010, the company made a profit of $25 million on revenue of $1.1 billion. In 2012, California Steel began construction of a new pipe mill, completion of which in 2014 increased the company's annual production capacity to 3 million tons of rolled steel and 0.6 million tons of pipe.

On December 13, 2021, it was announced that Nucor had bought out Vale's share in the company, along with a small portion of JFE's to become the majority owner of California Steel Industries.
