= Dongkuk Steel =

South Korean steel company

Dongkuk Steel Mill Co., Ltd.
- Native name: 동국제강
- Type: Public
- Traded as: KRX: 001230
- Industry: Steel
- Founded: July 1954; 72 years ago
- Founder: Chang Kyung-ho
- Headquarters: Seoul, South Korea
- Website: www.dongkuk.com/en

- Dongkuk Steel
- Hangul: 동국제강
- Hanja: 東國製鋼
- RR: Dongguk jegang
- MR: Tongguk chegang

Dongkuk Steel Mill Co, Ltd. (Korean: 동국제강) is a steel company with its headquarters in the city of Seoul, South Korea. Founded on 7 July 1951, its manufacturing plants are located in Pohang, Incheon, Dangjin, and Busan. Its main products are steel plates mainly for shipbuilding, beams, sections, and bars mainly for construction. Dongkuk Steel Mill is Korea's second largest EAF steel producer behind Hyundai Steel. Dongkuk Steel is the parent company of the Dongkuk Steel Group with several subsidiaries, including Union Steel.

== See also ==
- List of steel producers
