= JFE Holdings =

Japanese steelmaker

JFE Holdings, Inc.

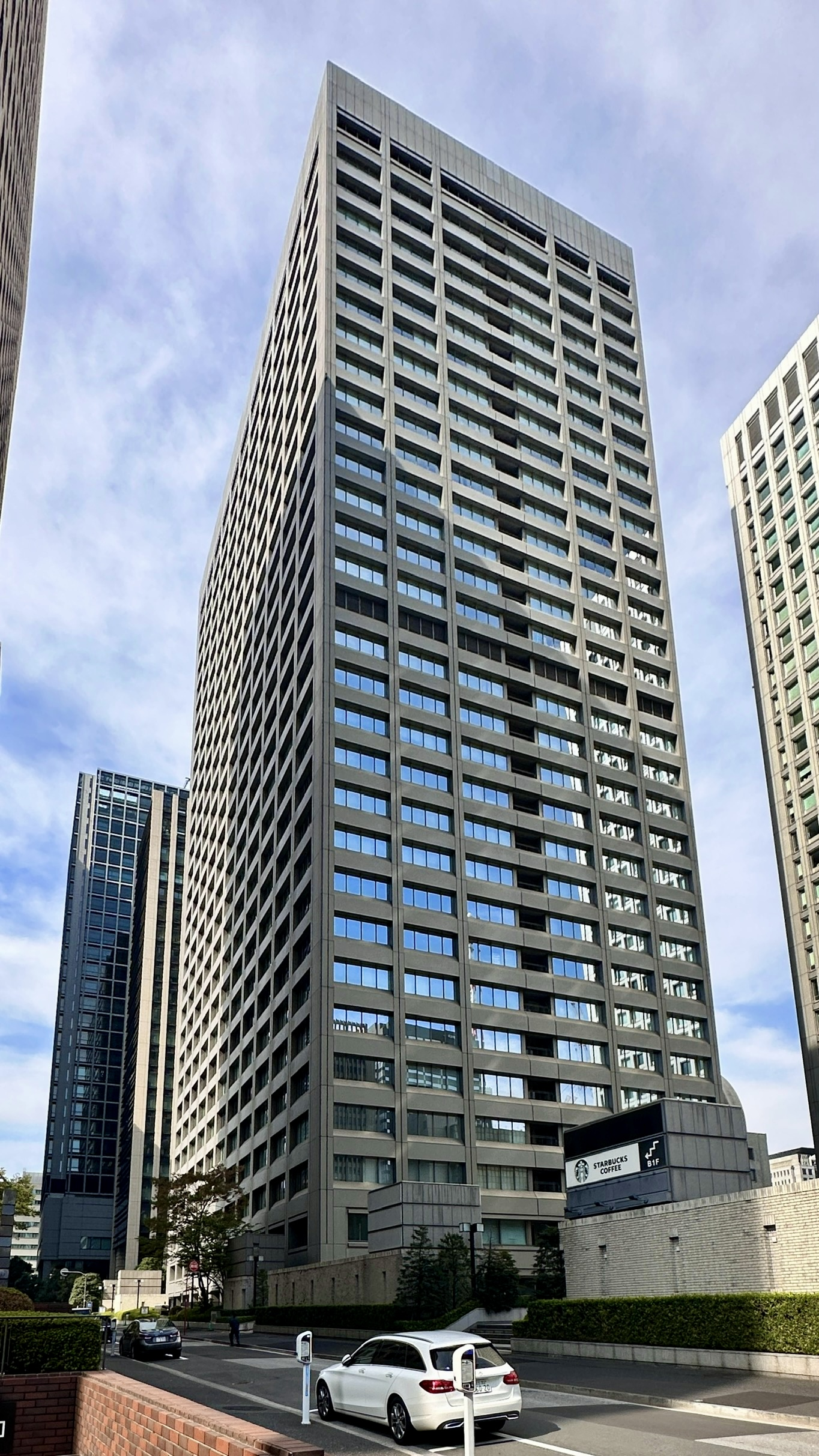
- Headquarters at Hibiya International Building in Chiyoda, Tokyo
- Trade name: JFE
- Native name: JFE(ジェイエフイー)ホールディングス株式会社
- Romanized name: Jeiefuī Hōrudingusu kabushiki gaisha
- Type: Public KK
- Traded as: TYO: 5411; NAG: 5411; TOPIX Large 70 Component
- ISIN: JP3386030005
- Industry: Steel
- Predecessor: NKK Corporation; Kawasaki Steel
- Founded: September 27, 2002; 23 years ago (through merger)
- Headquarters: Uchisaiwaichō, Chiyoda-ku, Tokyo 100-0011, Japan
- Area served: Worldwide
- Key people: Eiji Hayashida (President and CEO)
- Products: Steel; Flat steel products; Long steel products; Wire products; Steel plates
- Services: Engineering; Trading services
- Revenue: JPY 3,308 billion (FY 2016) (US$ 30.5 billion) (FY 2016)
- Net income: JPY 67.9 billion (FY 2016) (US$ 627 million) (FY 2016)
- Number of employees: 60,439 (consolidated, as of March 31, 2017)
- Subsidiaries: JFE Steel; JFE Engineering; Japan Marine United (45.93%)
- Website: Official website

JFE Holdings, Inc. (JFE(ジェイエフイー)ホールディングス株式会社, Jeiefuī Hōrudingusu Kabushiki-gaisha) is a corporation headquartered in Tokyo, Japan. It was formed in 2002 by the merger of NKK (日本鋼管株式会社, Nippon Kōkan Kabushiki-gaisha) and Kawasaki Steel Corporation (川崎製鉄株式会社, Kawasaki Seitetsu Kabushiki-gaisha) and owns JFE Steel, JFE Engineering and Japan Marine United. JFE is from Japan, Fe (the chemical element symbol of iron) and Engineering. In 2020, it was ranked 365th in Fortune Global 500 List.

== Mergers and Spinoffs ==
At the time JFE Holdings was created in 2002, NKK Corporation was Japan's second largest steelmaker and Kawasaki Steel was the third largest steelmaker. Both companies were major military vessel manufacturers during World War II.

JFE's main business is steel production. It also engages in engineering, ship building, real-estate redevelopment, and LSi business. The company also operates several overseas subsidiaries, including California Steel Industries in the United States, Fujian Sino-Japan Metal in China, and Minas da Serra Geral in Brazil. Other than steel, they are also known for products such as the bicycle tree.

JFE Holdings owns JFE Steel, the fifth largest steel maker in the world with revenue in excess of US$30 billion. JFE Holdings has other subsidiaries including JFE Engineering, JFE Steel and JFE Shoji, and part-owns Japan Marine United, a major shipbuilding company.

NKK and Siderca S.A. of Argentina established a seamless pipe joint venture by spinning off the seamless pipe division of NKK's Keihin Works in 2000. In November 2009, JFE agreed to partner with JSW Steel, India's third-largest steel producer, to construct a joint steel plant in West Bengal. In July 2010, JFE acquired a 14.9% stake in India's JSW Steel Ltd.

Its shipbuilding unit, Universal Shipbuilding was created in 2002 when NKK Corporation a predecessor of JFE, merged its shipbuilding unit with that of Hitachi Zosen. In 2012, JFE merged its ship building unit, Universal Shipbuilding Corporation, with Marine United Inc. of IHI after discussion started in April 2008 to form Japan Marine United Corporation It aimed to become Japan's largest shipbuilder. However, on January 1, 2021, JMU (with 49% of shares) merged into a new joint venture with Imabari Shipbuilding (with 51% of shares) named Nihon Shipyard and covering all ship types except LNG tankers. In parallel, Imabari Shipbuilding bought 30% of JMU's shares. The cooperation between Imabari Shipbuilding and JMU make it one of the largest marine engineering and shipbuilding company in the world.

== Products ==
=== Super-rapid charging ===
JFE Engineering Corporation is developing a quick charging station that it claims can take a battery from zero charge to 50% full in about 3 minutes. It has two batteries, one that stores electrical energy from the grid and another that delivers it to the car at extremely high current (500-600 ampere), which allows it to use a low voltage power supply. The company claims that one station costs about $63,000, roughly 40% less than the competing CHAdeMO system.

=== Bicycle Tree ===
The bicycle tree is an automatic storage system for bicycles that can hold up to 6,000 bikes. The systems works by fitting the bicycle with an electronic tag and a computer saves the owner's data. Then a mechanical arm pulls the bike into a cylindrical well and stores it in a free location. When the owner wants to retrieve the bike, a card is swiped through a reader and the computer retrieves the bike based on the data.
