= Kawasaki Steel Corporation =

Defunct Japanese steel manufacturing company

Kawasaki Steel Corporation (Kawasaki Seitetsu) was a Japanese steel manufacturing company.

== History ==
Originally forming the Steel Making Department of Kawasaki Heavy Industries, the Kawasaki Steel Corporation was incorporated in August 1950 following the post-World War II breakup of the Kawasaki Dockyard. It was headed by a Japanese engineer Nishiyama Yatarō, who had convinced Kawasaki Heavy Industries to perform the breakup. At this point in time the company was using open hearth furnaces, but during the 1950s it built an integrated steel mill located at Chiba Works on reclaimed land in Chiba City.

The blooming process of the Chiba Works was first placed under computer control in 1962. In 1966, the company began manufacturing iron powders. It added reduced iron powder and atomized powder manufacturing in 1978, then segregation-free iron powder in 1989. In 1989, it entered into a limit partnership with United States steel company Armco. The company was renamed AK Steel Holding in 1993 when it became publicly traded. In 2000, the price war resulting from the so-called Ghosn shock impacted the business performance of steel manufacturers such as Kawasaki Steel. During the resulting credit crisis, NKK and Kawasaki Steel decided to merge their businesses in April 2001. This merger was completed in September 2002, forming JFE Holdings.

== Involvement in Japanese football ==
The original Kawasaki Steel Mizushima football (soccer) club was formed in Mizushima, a section of Kurashiki, Okayama Prefecture, in 1966. In 1975, some "old boy" players formed their own club in the same area, naming it River Free Kickers. In 1995, the main club moved to Kobe, Hyōgo Prefecture, and became today's Vissel Kobe; the fan club remained in Okayama Prefecture but moved to Okayama city in 2004, becoming today's Fagiano Okayama.
