= General George S. Patton Memorial Museum =

Biographical museum in Chiriaco Summit, California

General Patton Memorial Museum
- Statue of Patton standing on tank treads with Willie (his pet dog), installed outside the General George S. Patton Memorial Museum
- Established: 1988
- Location: 62-510 Chiriaco Road; Chiriaco Summit, California
- Coordinates: 33°39′42″N 115°43′20″W
- Type: Biographical museum
- Website: http://www.generalpattonmuseum.com

Camp Young
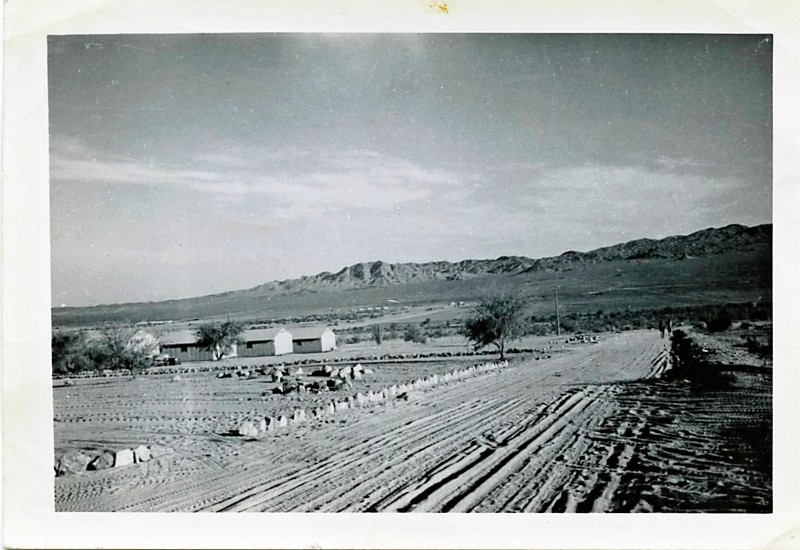
- US Army Camp Young in 1943

- Location within California
- 33°39′42″N 115°43′20″W
- Location: General Patton Memorial Museum

History
- Built: 1942

Site notes
- Area: 3,279.89 acres (1,327.32 ha)
- Architect: US Army

California Historical Landmark
- Reference no.: 985.1

The General George S. Patton Memorial Museum, in Chiriaco Summit, California, is a museum erected in tribute to General George S. Patton on the site of the entrance of Camp Young, part of the Desert Training Center of World War II.

Exhibits include a large collection of tanks used in World War II and the Korean War, as well as memorabilia from Patton's life and career – especially in regard to his service at the Desert Training Center – and from soldiers who trained there. Development of the Colorado River Aqueduct and natural-science exhibits are also displayed. In addition, a 26-minute video is shown, detailing Patton's military service and the creation of the Desert Training Center.

Though Patton spent less than four months at the Desert Training Center, his establishment of the training grounds directly impacted more than one million troops.

The museum is at the Chiriaco Summit exit of Interstate 10, 30 miles (48 km) east of Indio. It is 1,000 feet (300 m) west of the Chiriaco Summit Airport.

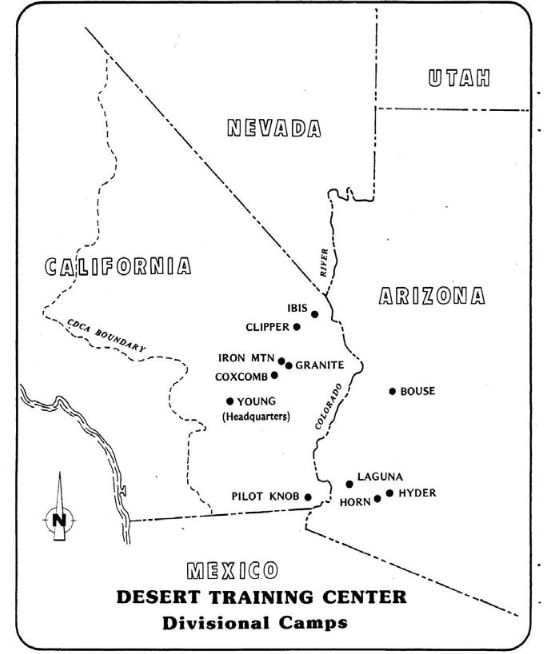
Desert Training Center map US Army 1943

== Camp Young ==
Camp Young was the headquarters for General Patton's 3rd Armored Division. Camp Young was the 3rd Armored Division main maneuvers area in training for tank warfare. Camp Young was active during the war and closed in 1944. War Department ordered Patton in March 1942 to create a desert training center in California. The goal was to prepare troops to battle North Africa to fight the Afrikakorps and Italian forces. The 3rd Armored Division, IV Corps Command Headquarters, and an Engineer Camouflage Battalion were stationed at Camp Young. Troops trained at Camp Young and its sub camps before overseas deployment. Camp Young, 3,279.89 acres (1,327.32 ha), was acquired from the Department of the Interior. South and West of Camp Young 13 ranges were built for mortar (37mm, 75mm, and 155mm) and small caliber firearm.

Camp Young received air support from the Shavers Army Airfield built in April 1943. The United States Army Air Forces Fourth Air Force used the landing strip as a training base during World War 2. The airstrip was used to support the Camp Young reconnaissance activities, and aircraft were used to coordinate tanks and other armored vehicles from the air. Each sub-camp had an air support Airfield. After the war, the airfield was given to the local government for civilian use. It is still in use today as the Chiriaco Summit Airport (L77)). It is located one mile (1.85 km) northeast of the business district of Chiriaco Summit.

Camp Young was the headquarters and managed sub camps:

California Divisional Camps:

- Camp Coxcomb
- Camp Granite
- Camp Essex and Camp Clipper
- Camp Iron Mountain
- Camp Ibis
- Camp Pilot Knob
- Camp Young

California Depots – hospitals:

- Camp Freda – Depot and hospital
- Camp Desert Center Depot and hospital
- Banning General Hospital – Hospital
- Torney General Hospital – Hospital
- Camp Goffs – Depot and hospital
- San Bernardino Engineer Depot – Depot and hospital
- Needles Station Hospital
- Cherry Valley Hospital

Arizona Divisional Camps:

- Camp Bouse (WW2 secret camp)
- Camp Horn
- Camp Hyder
- Camp Laguna and the Yuma Test Branch – both became the Yuma Proving Ground
- A few bombing and artillery ranges

Major airfields:

- Blythe Army Air Base – in use as Airport
- Desert Center Army Airfield – in use as Airport
- Thermal Army Airfield – in use as Airport
- Rice Army Airfield – abandoned
- Shavers Summit Army Airfield in use as Chiriaco Summit Airport

Minor airfields:

- Camp Coxcomb Army Field – abandoned
- Dateland Air Force Auxiliary Field – abandoned
- Camp Essex Army Field – abandoned
- Camp Goffs Army Field – abandoned
- Camp Horn Army Airfield – abandoned
- Camp Ibis Army Field – abandoned
- Camp Iron Mountain Army Field – in use as Iron Mountain Pumping Plant Airport (72CL)
- Laguna Army Airfield – in use at Yuma Proving Ground

== California Historical Landmark ==
California Historical Landmarks Marker at Camp Young – Desert Training Center sites reads:

Camp Young – Riverside

- NO. 985 DESERT TRAINING CENTER, CALIFORNIA–ARIZONA MANEUVER AREA (ESTABLISHED BY MAJOR GENERAL GEORGE S. PATTON, JR.) – CAMP YOUNG – The D.T.C. was established by Major General George S. Patton, Jr., in response to a need to train American combat troops for battle in North Africa during World War II. The camp, which began operation in 1942, covered 18,000 square miles. It was the largest military training ground ever to exist. Over one million men were trained at the eleven sub-camps (seven in California).
Patton Memorial Museum – Camp Young

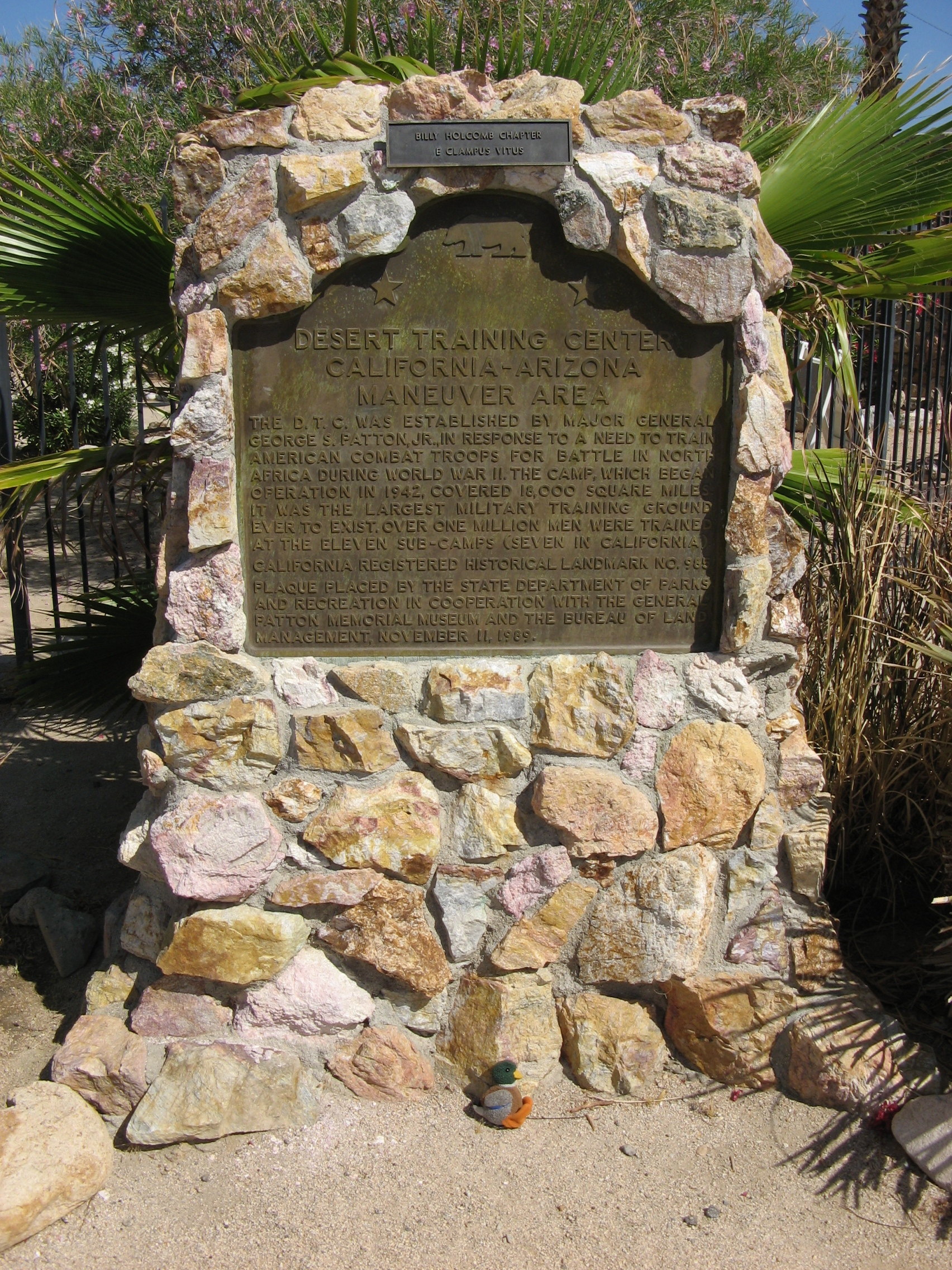
Desert Training Center historical plaque on the museum grounds

A special vehicle used for towing tanks, on the museum grounds

World War I trench art display in the museum

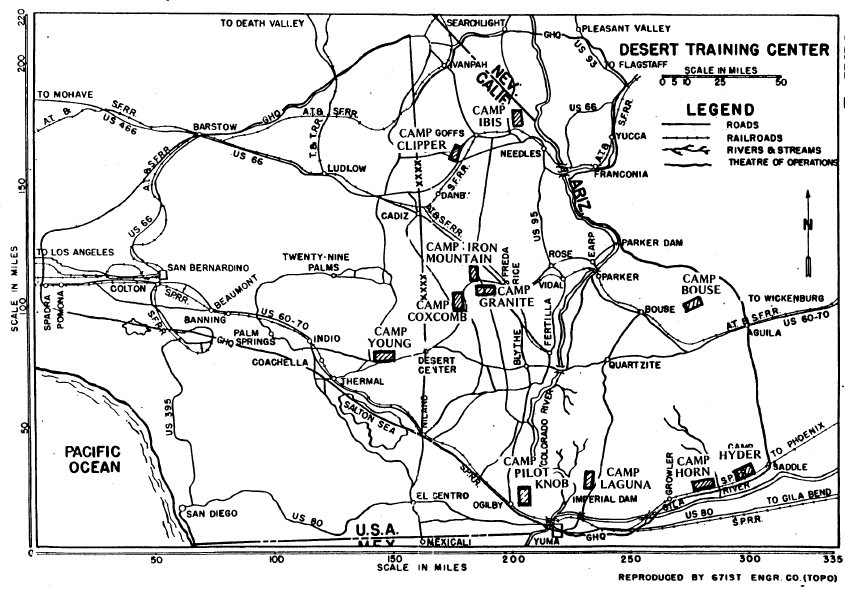
Map of California Desert Training Center

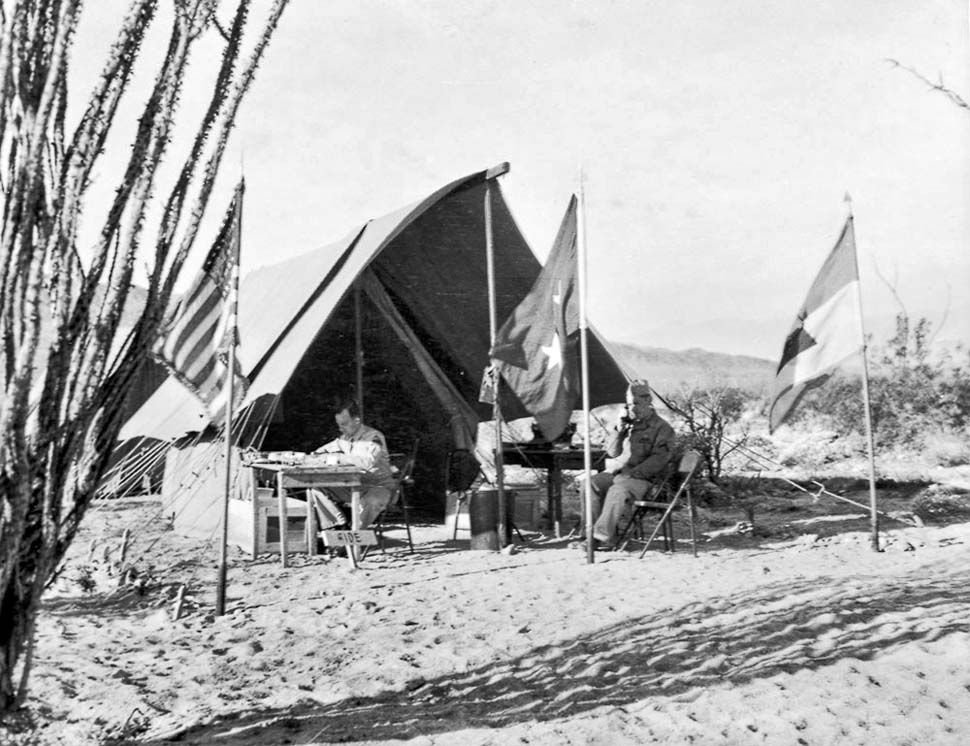
Camp Young HQ 1943

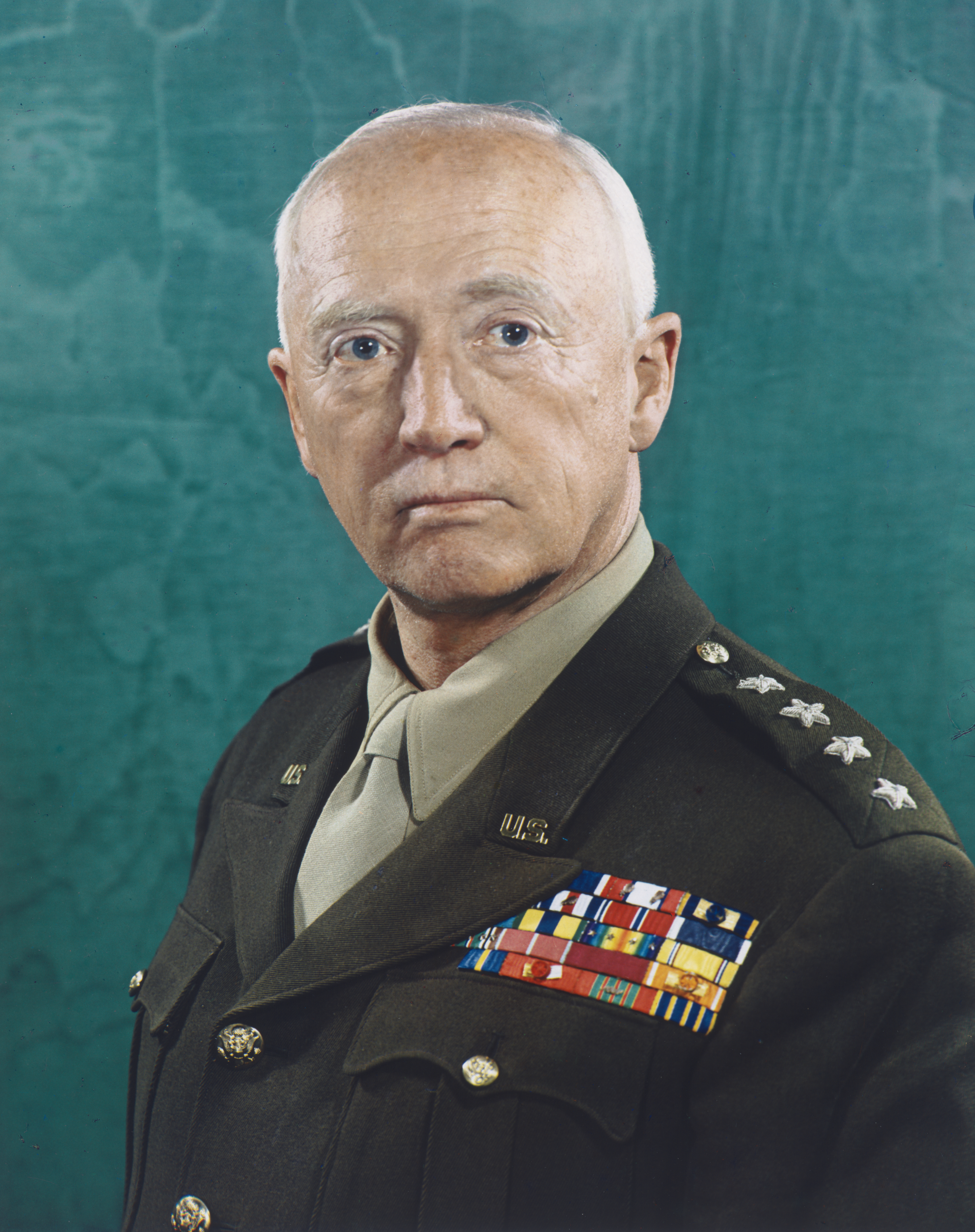
George S. Patton in January 1945

== See also ==
- Patton Monument (West Point)
- General George Patton Museum, Fort Knox, Kentucky
- California Historical Landmarks in Riverside County, California
- California during World War II
