= Dateland, Arizona =

Census-designated place in Yuma County, Arizona, United States

- Census-designated place
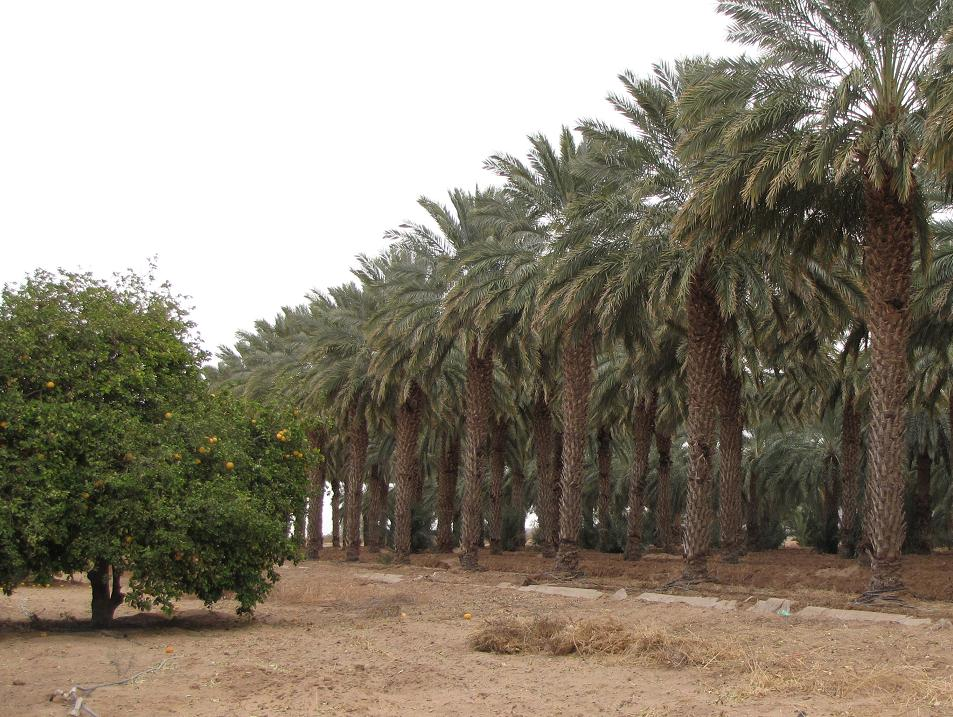
- Rows of date palms behind the Dateland Travel Center

- Location of Dateland in Yuma County, Arizona.

- Location within the state of Arizona Dateland, Arizona (the United States)
- Coordinates: 32°49′25″N 113°30′32″W
- Country: United States
- State: Arizona
- County: Yuma

Area
  - Total: 21.95 sq mi (56.86 km^{2})
  - Land: 21.95 sq mi (56.86 km^{2})
  - Water: 0 sq mi (0.00 km^{2})
- Elevation: 436 ft (133 m)

Population (2020)
  - Total: 257
  - Density: 11.7/sq mi (4.52/km^{2})
- Time zone: UTC-7 (Mountain (MST))
- ZIP code: 85333
- FIPS code: 04-18160
- GNIS feature ID: 2582769

Dateland is a Census-designated place (CDP) and colonia in Yuma County, Arizona, United States. It is in an area well known for date palm dates.

== Description ==
Dateland has the ZIP Code of 85333; according to the 2020–2024 American Community Survey 5-year estimates, ZIP Code Tabulation Area (ZCTA) 85333 had a population of 442.

The community is part of the Yuma Metropolitan Statistical Area.

== Demographics ==
Historical population
Census	Pop.	Note	%±
2010	416		—
2020	257		−38.2%
U.S. Decennial Census

Dateland CDP, Arizona – Racial and ethnic composition Note: the US Census treats Hispanic/Latino as an ethnic category. This table excludes Latinos from the racial categories and assigns them to a separate category. Hispanics/Latinos may be of any race.
Race / Ethnicity (NH = Non-Hispanic)	2020	2010
White alone (NH)	30% (77)	39.9% (166)
Black alone (NH)	0% (0)	0% (0)
American Indian alone (NH)	0.4% (1)	0% (0)
Asian alone (NH)	0% (0)	0.2% (1)
Pacific Islander alone (NH)	0% (0)	0% (0)
Other race alone (NH)	0% (0)	0% (0)
Multiracial (NH)	1.2% (3)	0.5% (2)
Hispanic/Latino (any race)	68.5% (176)	59.4% (247)

As of 2020, 68.5% of the CDP's population were Mexican.

== History ==
Dateland began as a road stop in the 1920s. During World War II, Dateland was the site of two of General Patton's desert training camps, Camp Horn and Camp Hyder. In addition, in 1942, three airstrips were built in Dateland for training B25 Bombers, including the Dateland Air Force Auxiliary Field. The U.S. military still uses the Dateland area for periodic training. American troops that served in Iraq and Afghanistan have spent some time training in Dateland.

Sugar rationing in 1942 during World War II led to the increase of date production in Arizona, leading to growing popularity for dates as a sweet alternative to candy, boosting Arizona's date industry.

After the closure of the airfield, the land was subdivided in the 1970s. The developers of one subdivision on the former airfield, El Camino Del Sol, were convicted of fraud in 1977. Most of Dateland consists of undeveloped lots.

== Climate ==
This area has a large amount of sunshine year-round due to its stable descending air and high pressure. According to the Köppen Climate Classification system, Dateland has a desert climate, abbreviated "BWh" on climate maps.

A locality near Dateland called Montezuma recorded a temperature of 105.1 °F (40.6 °C) on February 3, 1963, making it the record holder for the highest temperature in the United States in February.

Climate data for Dateland
Month	Jan	Feb	Mar	Apr	May	Jun	Jul	Aug	Sep	Oct	Nov	Dec	Year
Record high °F (°C)	88 (31)	94 (34)	100 (38)	106 (41)	115 (46)	120 (49)	122 (50)	120 (49)	114 (46)	108 (42)	99 (37)	89 (32)	122 (50)
Mean daily maximum °F (°C)	69 (21)	73 (23)	79 (26)	86 (30)	95 (35)	103 (39)	106 (41)	105 (41)	101 (38)	89 (32)	78 (26)	68 (20)	88 (31)
Daily mean °F (°C)	55 (13)	58 (14)	63 (17)	69 (21)	77 (25)	85 (29)	91 (33)	91 (33)	85 (29)	73 (23)	62 (17)	54 (12)	72 (22)
Mean daily minimum °F (°C)	41 (5)	43 (6)	47 (8)	52 (11)	58 (14)	66 (19)	75 (24)	76 (24)	69 (21)	57 (14)	46 (8)	39 (4)	56 (13)
Record low °F (°C)	22 (−6)	25 (−4)	30 (−1)	32 (0)	36 (2)	49 (9)	54 (12)	55 (13)	49 (9)	35 (2)	25 (−4)	17 (−8)	17 (−8)
Average precipitation inches (mm)	0.7 (18)	0.5 (13)	0.4 (10)	0.2 (5.1)	0 (0)	0 (0)	0.4 (10)	0.6 (15)	0.5 (13)	0.4 (10)	0.4 (10)	0.7 (18)	4.8 (122.1)

== Infrastructure ==
=== Utilities ===
Dateland is served by the following utilities:

- Arizona Public Service – electric
- Arizona Telephone Co. (a subsidiary of TDS Telecom) – telephone
- Dateland Public Service Co. (a tax-exempt utility) – water

=== Buildings ===
Dateland has several historic properties due to its history as stopping point along many pioneer trails and as a military training ground.

== Education ==
It is in the Hyder Elementary School District and the Antelope Union High School District.

== See also ==
- List of historic properties in Dateland, Arizona
- San Cristobal Valley
