= Camp Horn, Arizona =

California Historic Landmark

Camp Horn
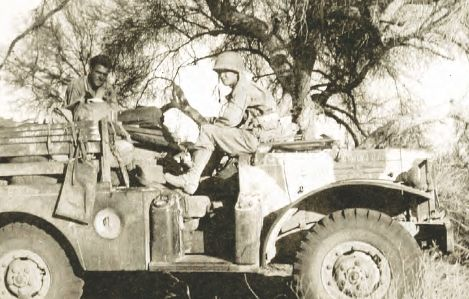
- Jeep at Camp Horn in 1943

- Location within Arizona
- 32°57′N 113°32′W
- Location: Camp Horn, Arizona

History
- Built: fall of 1943

Site notes
- Architect: US Army

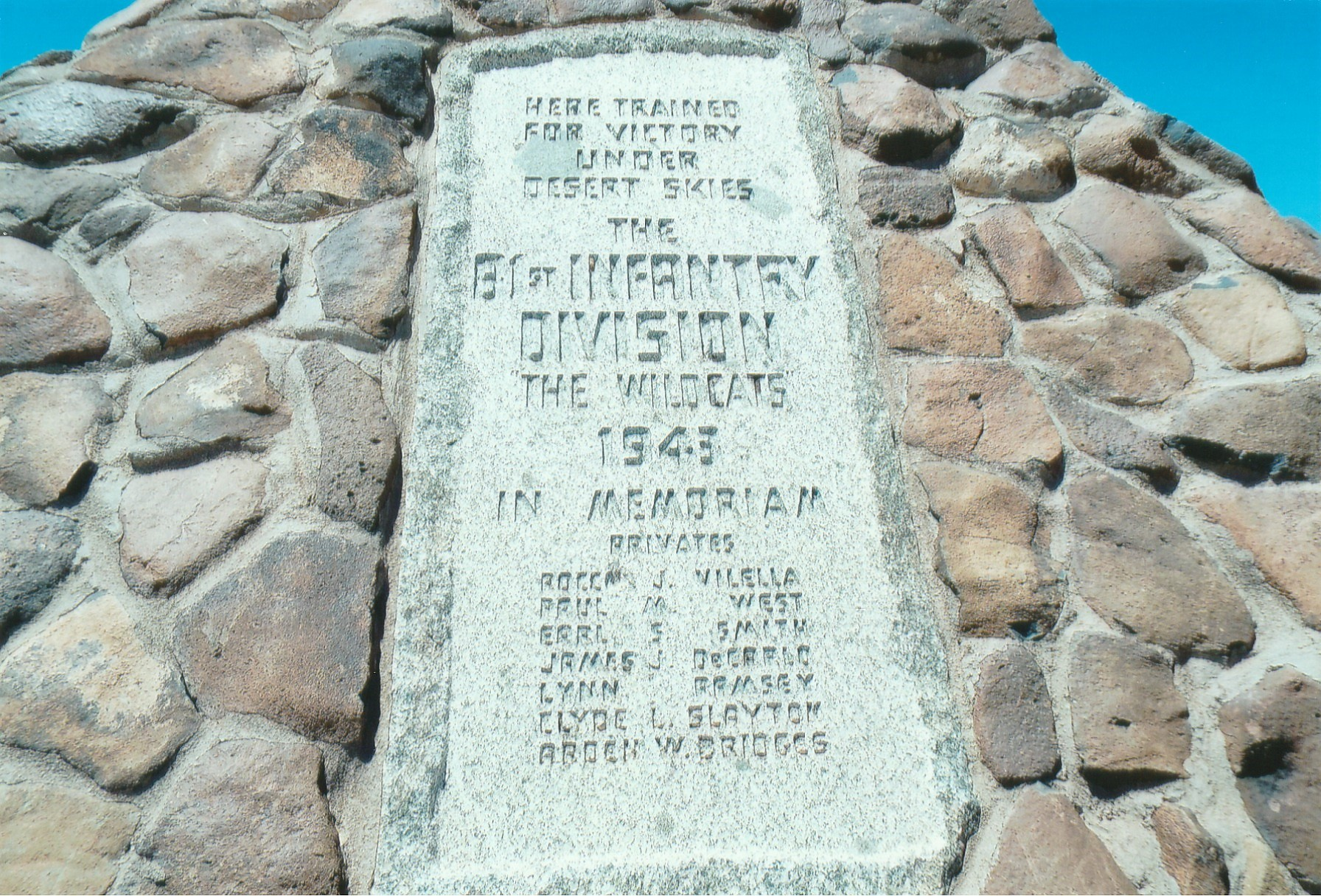
Camp Horn Monument

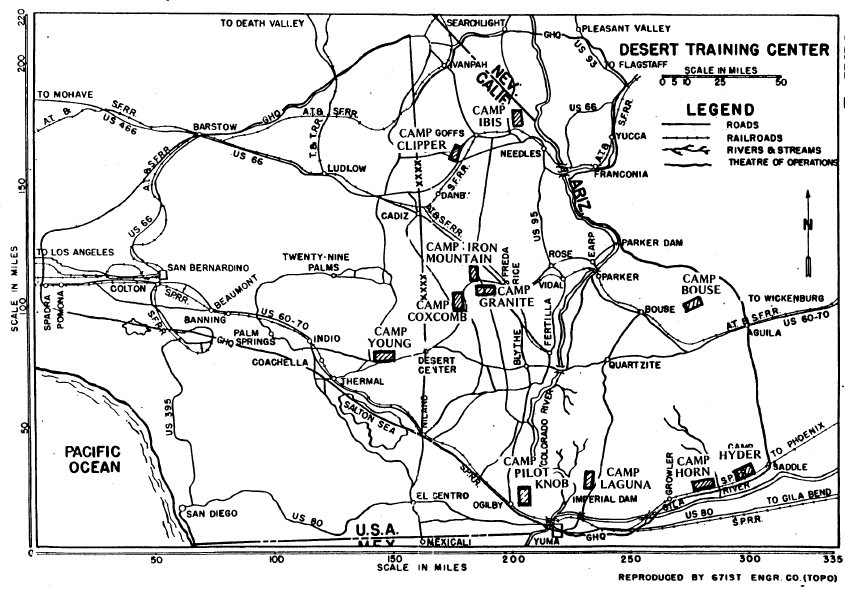
Map of Desert training center with Camp Horn

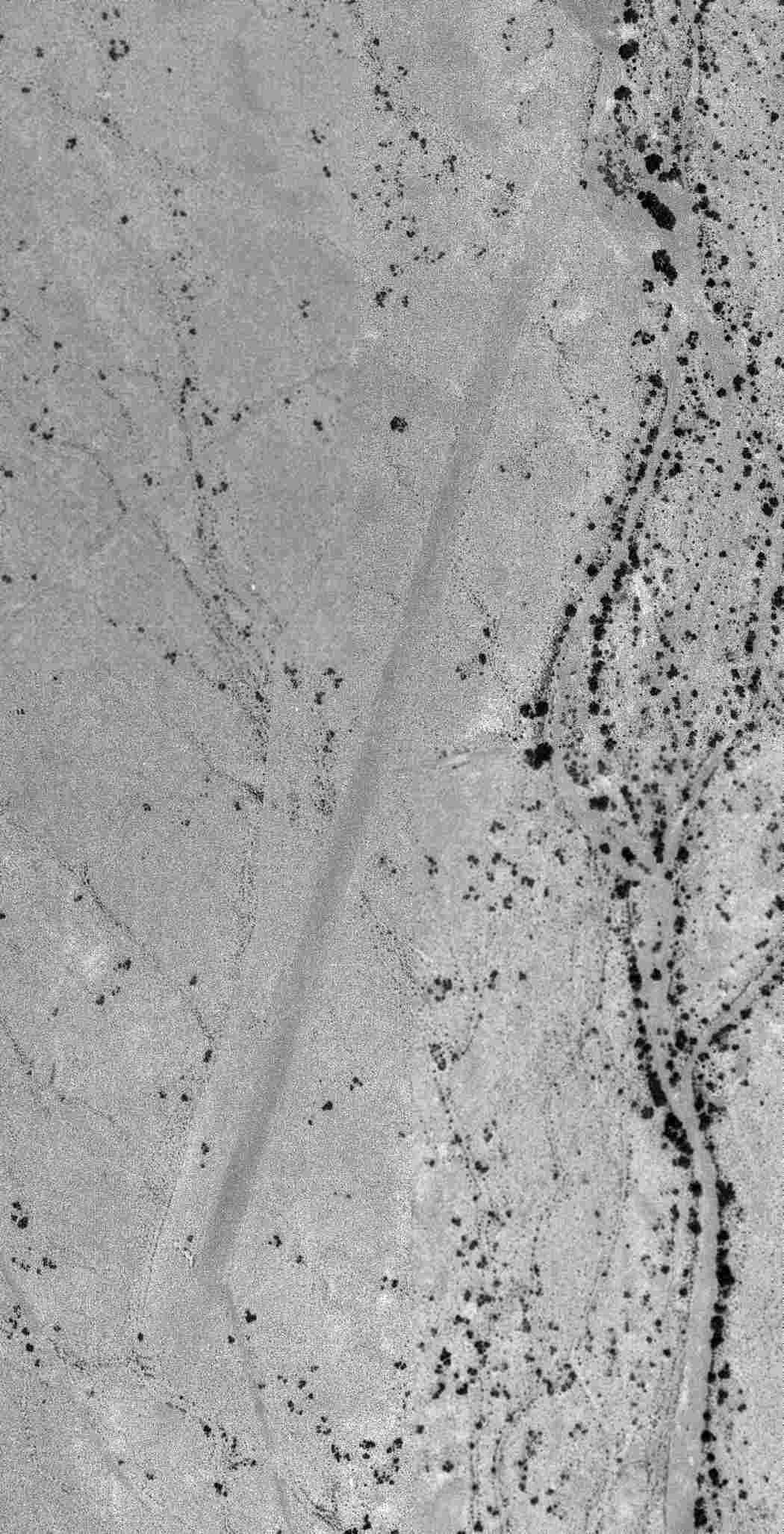
Camp Horn Airfield from a 1963 USGS aerial photo

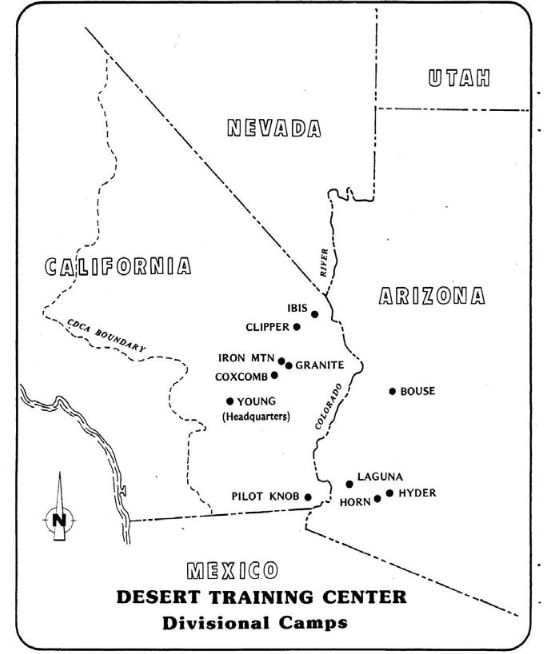
Desert Training Center map US Army 1943

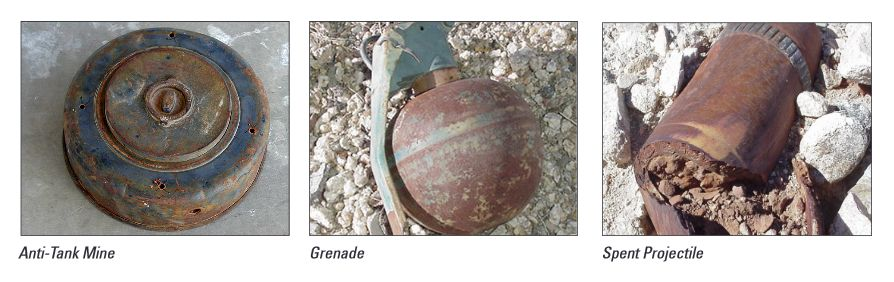
US Army live fire exercises remains at Desert Training Center

The Camp Horn was a sub camp of the US Army, Desert Training Center in Riverside County, California. The main headquarters for the Desert Training Center was Camp Young, this is where General Patton's 3rd Armored Division was stationed. Camp Horn was near Camp Hyder about 6 miles (9.7 km) miles west of Hyder, Arizona. Camp Horn was just north of the Gila River. Camp Horn was 54 miles (87 km) miles east of Yuma, Arizona. Most troop arrived at Camp Horn from the train station at Camp Hyder or the train station at Sentinel, Arizona south of the camp. Over 13,000 troops were trained at Camp Horn and Camp Hyder. The 81st Infantry Division trained at Camp Horn was from June 1943 to November 1943.

Camp Horn was built in the fall of 1943. Camp Horn was built to prepare troops to do battle in North Africa to fight the Nazis during World War II. When completed the camp had shower buildings, latrines, wooden tent frames, outdoor theater, firing ranges, water storage tanks and water treatment plant. Near the camp in Agua Caliente, Arizona the army built the Agua Caliente natural hot spring for the troops to use, this in on the land of the Agua Caliente Ranch. The only remains of Camp Horn are rock lines walkways and road.

== Camp Horn Army Air Field ==
Just to the east of the Camp Horn was built the Camp Horn Army Air Field. It had single 4,500 runway. The Camp Horn Army Air Field in 1944 at the same time the camp closed. The air landing strip was used to support camp's training activities. The runway was from use for small planes, like the L-4 Piper Aircraft so the vast training grounds could be watched from the air. The runway runs in a northeast–southwest direction, from the air the faint outline of the runway can still be seen.

== Dateland Air Force Auxiliary Field ==
Near Camp Horn also was the Dateland Air Force Auxiliary Field, named after the Dateland, Arizona road stop. It was also used to support Camp Horn. The runway was long enough for large planes to use in training exercises also. The United States Army Air Forces opened on 1 January 1943. It was also used for Air Forces training by the 3037th Army Air Force Base Unit. The landing strip was under the direction of the Yuma Army Airfield, Arizona.

== Markers ==
Marker at the site reads:

- Camps Hyder & Horn were established 10 miles north of Dateland in the fall of 1943. They were 2 of 15 desert camps built to harden and train United States Troops for service in World War II. The Desert Training Center was a simulated theater of operations that included portions of California, Arizona, and Nevada. The camps were Bouse, Clipper, Coxcomb, Desert Center, Essex, Goffs, Granite, Horn, Hyder, Ibis, Iron Mountain, Laguna, Pilot Knob, Rice, and Young, as well as Rice Army Airfield. A total of 13 infantry and 7 armored divisions plus numerous smaller units were trained in this harsh environment. The training center was in operation for 2 years and was closed early in 1944 when the last units were shipped overseas. During this brief period over a million American soldiers were trained for combat. Units stationed at Hyder and Horn were the 77th, 81st and 104th Infantry Divisions. This monument is dedicated to all the soldiers that served here and especially to those who gave their lives to end the Holocaust & defeat the Armed Forces of Nazi Germany, Fascist Italy, and Imperial Japan. Erected 2002 by Lost Dutchman, Billy Holcomb, John P Squibob, Queho Posse, Peter Lebeck and Matt Warner Chapters, of E Clampus Vitus and Dateland Elementary School. (Marker Number 110.)

The Camp Horn Monument or Fort Horn Monument Marker, in memory of seven servicemen killed in a training accident, at the site read:

- Here trained For Victory, Under Desert Skies, The 81st Infantry Division, The Wildcats 1943, In Memoriam: Privates Rocco J Vilella, Paul M. West, Earl S. Smith, James J. DeCarlo, Lynn Ramsey, Clyde B. Slayton, Arden W. Bridges.

Marker at the Dateland Air Force Auxiliary Field site reads:

- Datelan Army Air Field was established here January 1, 1943. The site was chosen due to the availability of water and the adjacent location of the Yuma Gunnery Range. Construction was completed June 1, 1943. Datelan AAF was a sub-base of Yuma Army Air Field, which was the location of the Army advanced flying school. Colfred, Stovall, and Wellton Gunnery Ranges were also established nearby. The base was originally designed for single engine gunnery training, but was converted to twin engine gunnery school in September 1943. The post was garrisoned on July 8, 1943. In addition to security and maintenance of the base, the troops provided services for several flying organizations. Among these were Mather Army Air Field, which based 60 B-25J gun ships here from December 25, 1943 to January 20, 1944, logging a total of 11,000 hours of flight training. This monument is dedicated to all the soldiers and airmen that served here, especially those that gave their lives in training and in the skies above Europe, Asia, and the Pacific as they defeated the Axis powers. Holcomb, John P. Squibob, Queho Posse, Peter Lebeck and Matt Warner Chapters of E Clampus Vitus and Dateland Elementary School. (Marker Number 111.)

== See also ==
- Camp Coxcomb
- Marine Corps Air Station Yuma
- Arizona World War II Army Airfields
