= Camp Hyder =

US Army sub camp during World War II

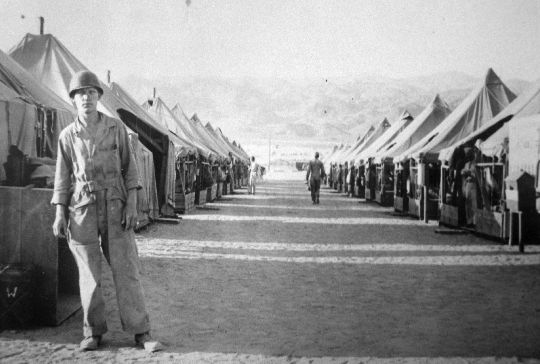
- Camp Hyder 1943

- Location within Arizona
- 33°00′17″N 113°20′25″W
- Location: Hyder, Arizona

History
- Built: 1943

Site notes
- Architect: US Army

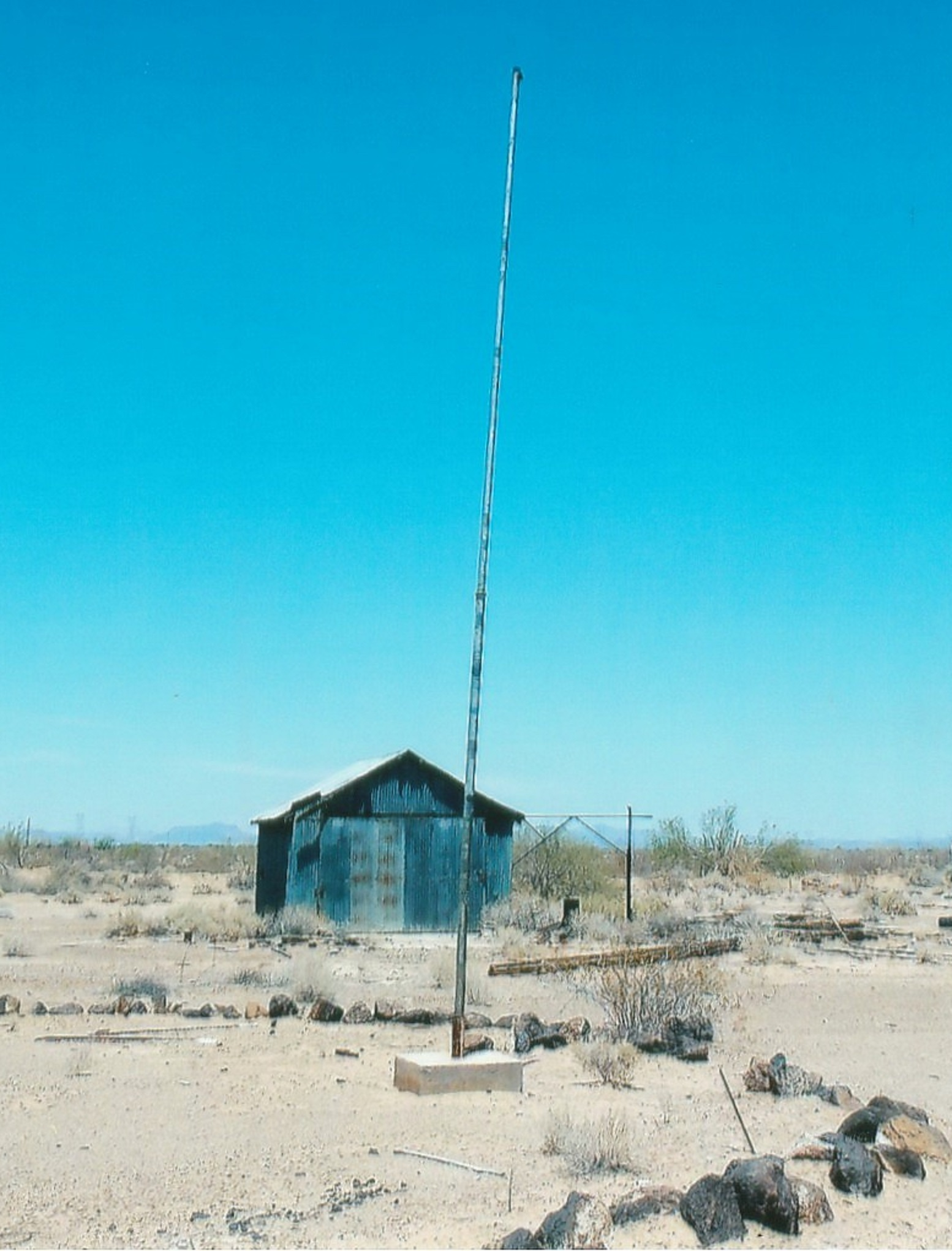
Camp Hyder

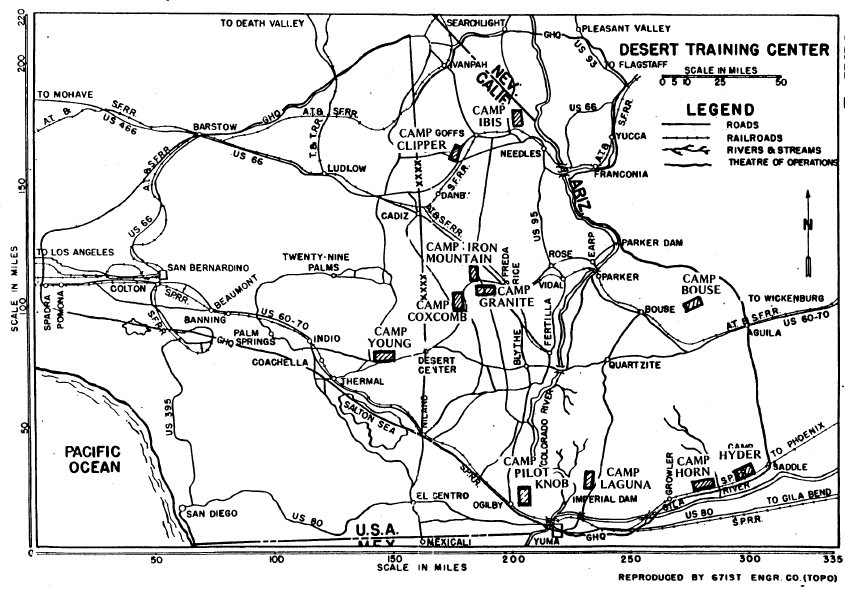
Map of Desert training center with Camp Hyder

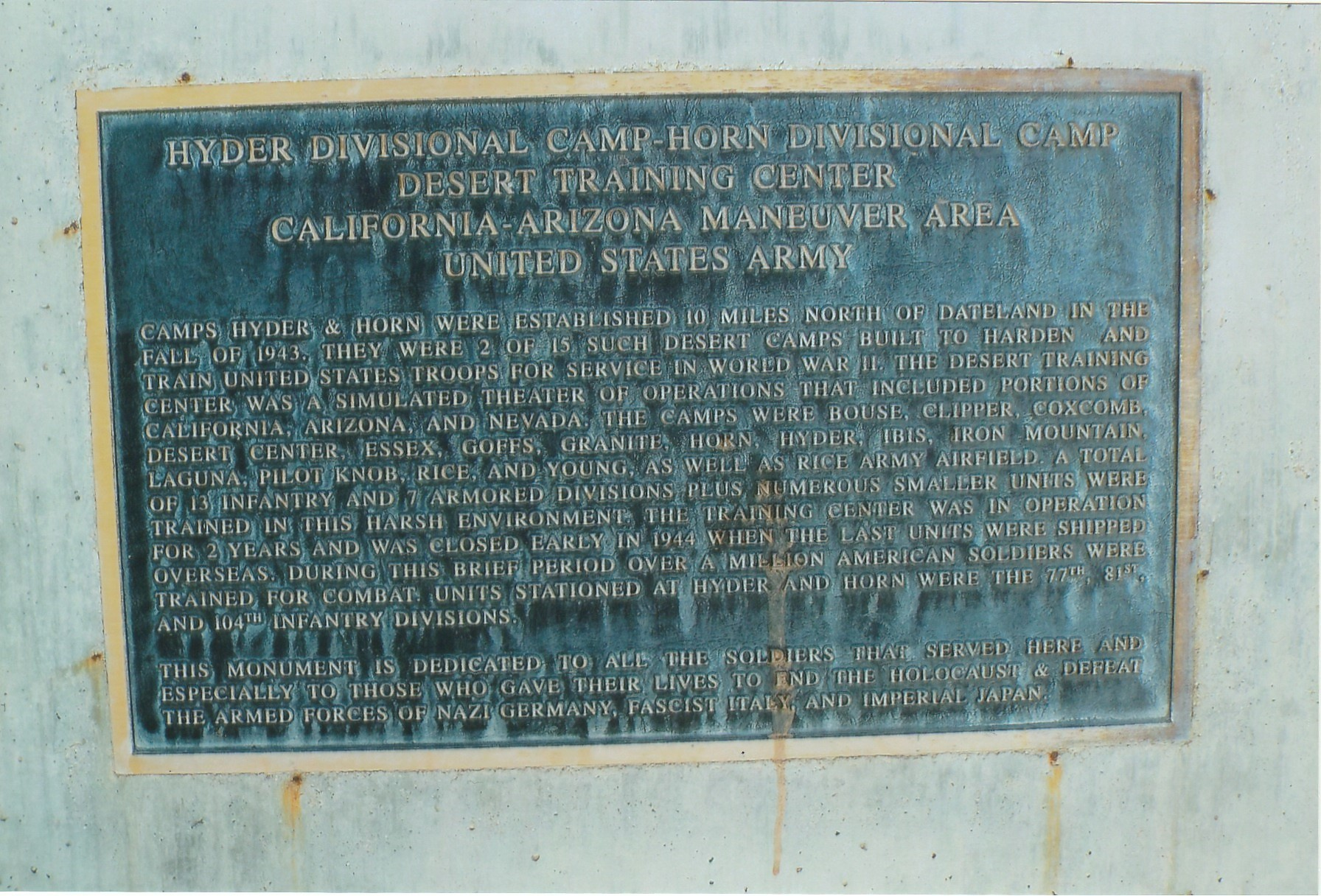
Camp Hyder Marker

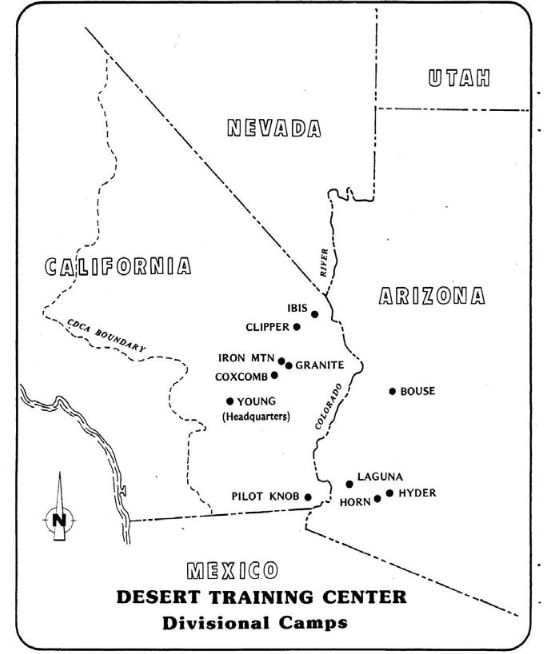
Desert Training Center map US Army 1943

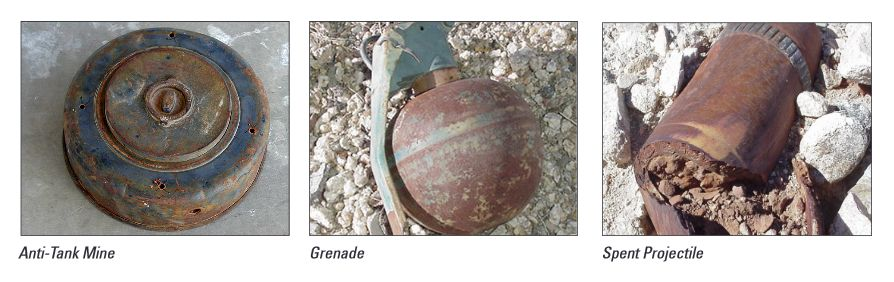
US Army live fire exercises remains at Desert Training Center

Camp Hyder was a US Army installation in Arizona, functioning as a subcamp of the Desert Training Center in Riverside County, California. The main headquarters for the Desert Training Center was Camp Young, this is where General Patton's 3rd Armored Division was stationed. Camp Hyder is 2 miles (3.2 km) miles south of Hyder, Arizona. The camp was just north of the Gila River. Camp Hyder is 60 miles (97 km) miles east of Yuma, Arizona, near Camp Horn. Camp Hyder was built at the site of an old 1890s military base. Trained at Camp Hyder, in 1943, for six months was the 77th Infantry Division from April 1943 to September 1943. Then the 104th Infantry Division moved in for training. Unlike the other camps, no large tank activity was done. The camp was built by The 369th Engineer Regiment. Camp Hyder had its own rail station at which most troops arrived. The train station at Sentinel, Arizona south of the camp was also used. Over 13,000 troops were trained at Camp Horn and Camp Hyder.

Camp Hyder was built in August 1942. The Desert Training Center was built to prepare troops to do battle in North Africa to fight the Nazis during World War II. At the camp's railway station were two large stone columns marking the entrance to the camp. Near the camp in Agua Caliente, Arizona the army built the Agua Caliente natural hot spring for the troops to use, this in on the land of the Agua Caliente Ranch. When completed the camp had shower buildings, latrines, outdoor theater, wooden tent frames, two 10,000-gallon water storage tanks and a water treatment plant. The camp had many firing ranges for .30- and .50-caliber machine guns, as well as artillery. The camp also taught the use of anti-tank mines. The army used live-fire exercises and warning signs are still on the site. The camp was closed in May 1944.

== Dateland Air Force Auxiliary Field ==
To the SouthWest of Camp Hyder was the Dateland Air Force Auxiliary Field, named after the Dateland, Arizona road stop. The air landing strip was used to support the camp's training activities. The runway was from use for small planes, like the L-4 Piper Aircraft so the vast training grounds could be watched from the air. The runway was long enough for the large planes to use in training exercises also. The United States Army Air Forces opened on 1 January 1943. It was also used for Air Forces training by the 3037th Army Air Force Base Unit. The landing strip was under the direction of the Yuma Army Airfield, Arizona.

== Markers ==
Marker at the site reads:

- Camps Hyder & Horn were established 10 miles north of Dateland in the fall of 1943. They were 2 of 15 desert camps built to harden and train United States Troops for service in World War II. The Desert Training Center was a simulated theater of operations that included portions of California, Arizona, and Nevada. The camps were Bouse, Clipper, Coxcomb, Desert Center, Essex, Goffs, Granite, Horn, Hyder, Ibis, Iron Mountain, Laguna, Pilot Knob, Rice, and Young, as well as Rice Army Airfield. A total of 13 infantry and 7 armored divisions plus numerous smaller units were trained in this harsh environment. The training center was in operation for 2 years and was closed early in 1944 when the last units were shipped overseas. During this brief period over a million American soldiers were trained for combat. Units stationed at Hyder and Horn were the 77th, 81st and 104th Infantry Divisions. This monument is dedicated to all the soldiers that served here and especially to those who gave their lives to end the Holocaust & defeat the Armed Forces of Nazi Germany, Fascist Italy, and Imperial Japan. Erected 2002 by Lost Dutchman, Billy Holcomb, John P Squibob, Queho Posse, Peter Lebeck and Matt Warner Chapters, of E Clampus Vitus and Dateland Elementary School. (Marker Number 110.)

Marker at the Dateland Air Force Auxiliary Field site reads:

- Datelan Army Air Field was established here January 1, 1943. The site was chosen due to the availability of water and the adjacent location of the Yuma Gunnery Range. Construction was completed June 1, 1943. Dateland AAF was a sub-base of Yuma Army Air Field, which was the location of the Army advanced flying school. Colfred, Stovall, and Wellton Gunnery Ranges were also established nearby. The base was originally designed for single-engine gunnery training, but was converted to twin-engine gunnery school in September 1943. The post was garrisoned on July 8, 1943. In addition to security and maintenance of the base, the troops provided services for several flying organizations. Among these were Mather Army Air Field, which based 60 B-25J gun ships here from December 25, 1943 to January 20, 1944, logging a total of 11,000 hours of flight training. This monument is dedicated to all the soldiers and airmen that served here, especially those that gave their lives in training and in the skies above Europe, Asia, and the Pacific as they defeated the Axis powers. Holcomb, John P. Squibob, Queho Posse, Peter Lebeck and Matt Warner Chapters of E Clampus Vitus and Dateland Elementary School. (Marker Number 111.)

== See also ==
- Camp Laguna AZ
- Camp Bouse AZ
- Camp Coxcomb
- Camp Granite
- Camp Iron Mountain
- Camp Ibis
