= Sentinel, Arizona =

- Unincorporated community
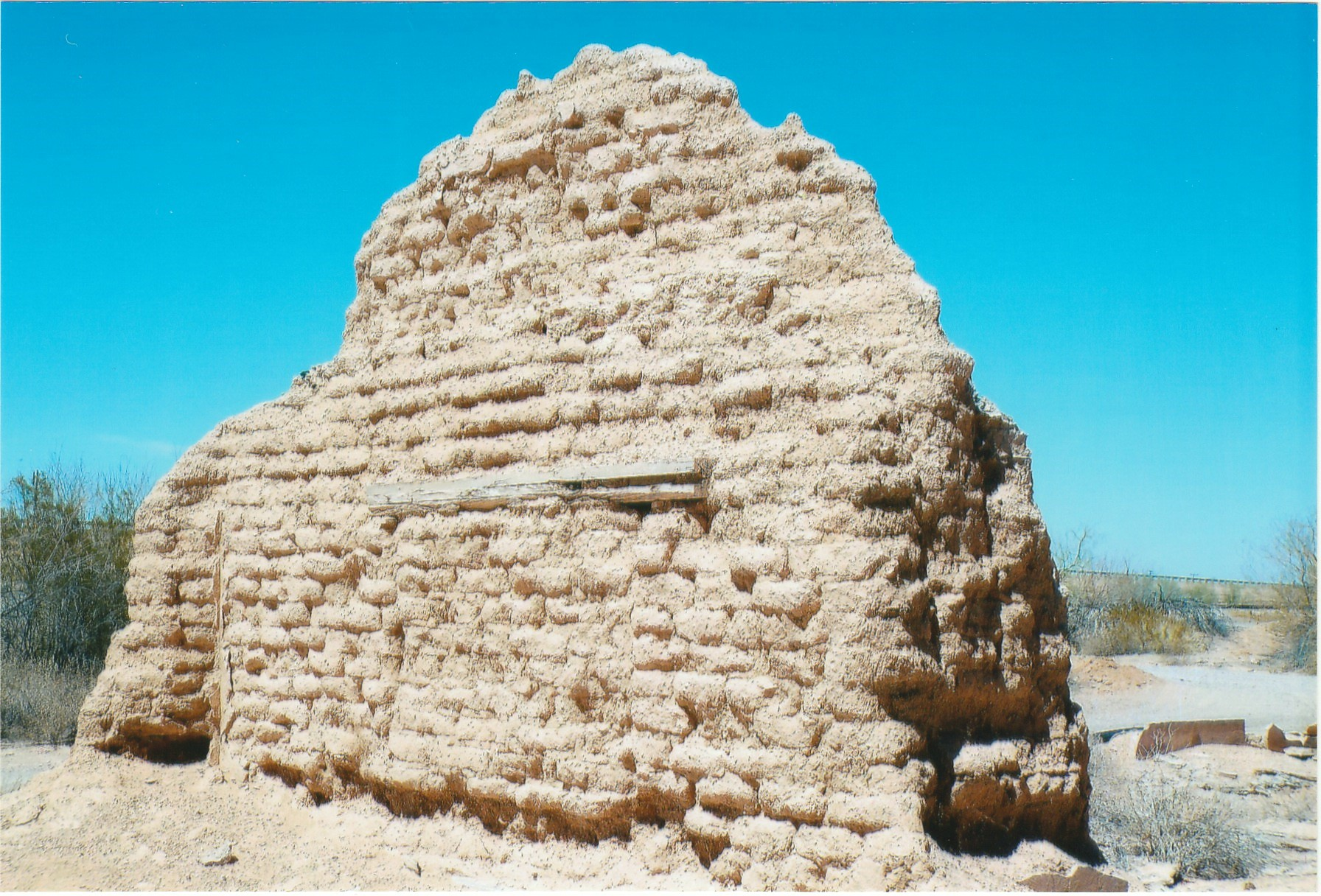
- Ruins of the 1895 Sentinel Train Depot

- Location within the state of Arizona Sentinel (the United States)
- Coordinates: 32°51′29″N 113°12′38″W
- Country: United States
- State: Arizona
- County: Maricopa
- Elevation: 692 ft (211 m)
- Time zone: UTC-7 (Mountain (MST))
  - Summer (DST): UTC-7 (MST)
- Area code: 928
- FIPS code: 04-65630
- GNIS feature ID: 11083

Sentinel is an unincorporated community in Maricopa County, Arizona, United States. It has an estimated elevation of 692 feet (211 m) above sea level.

The train station served the US Army training camps: Camp Horn and Camp Hyder during World War II.

== Sentinel ruins ==
Some of the late 19th Century ruins in Sentinel.

Ruins in Sentinel, Arizona
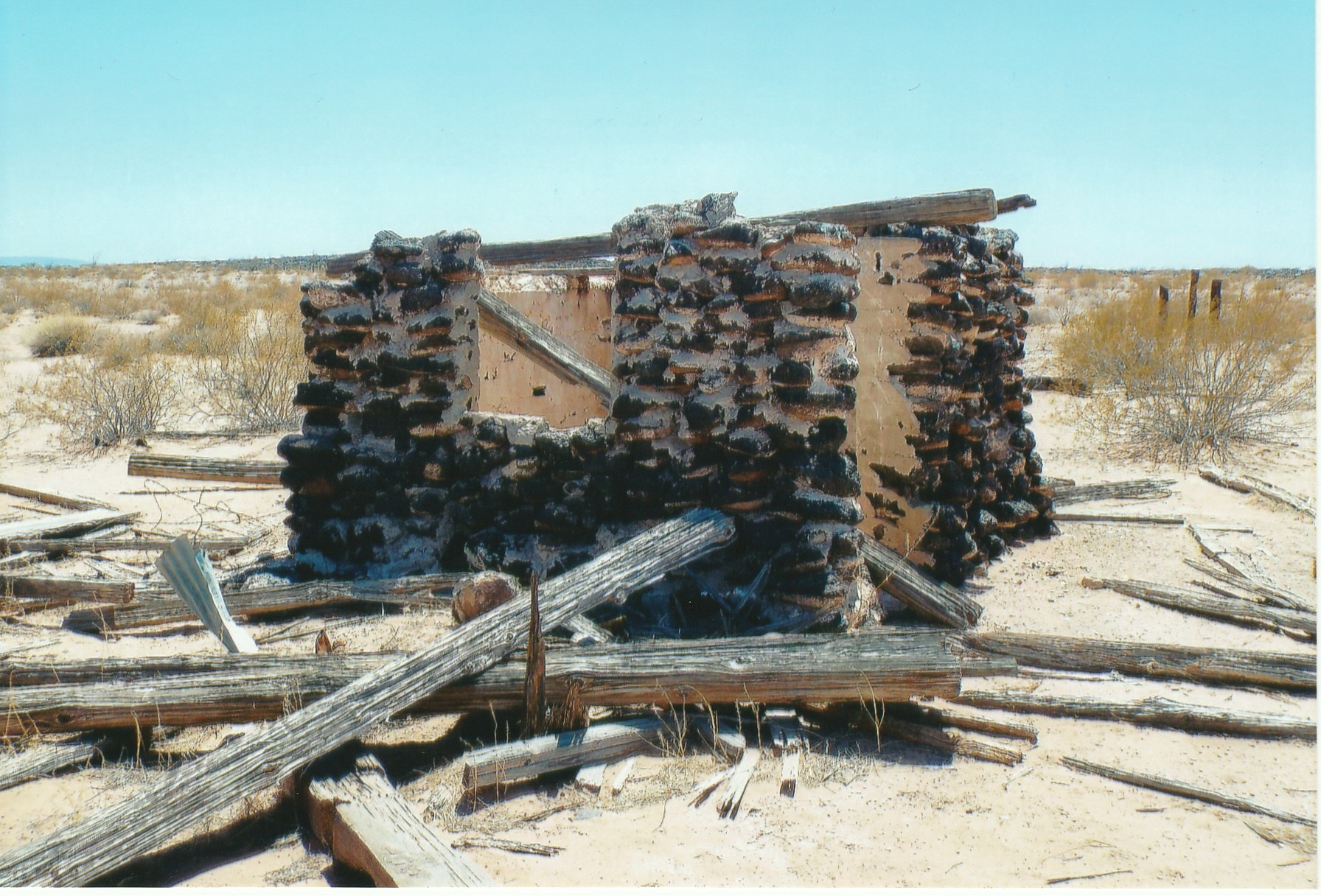
1890 Ranch house.

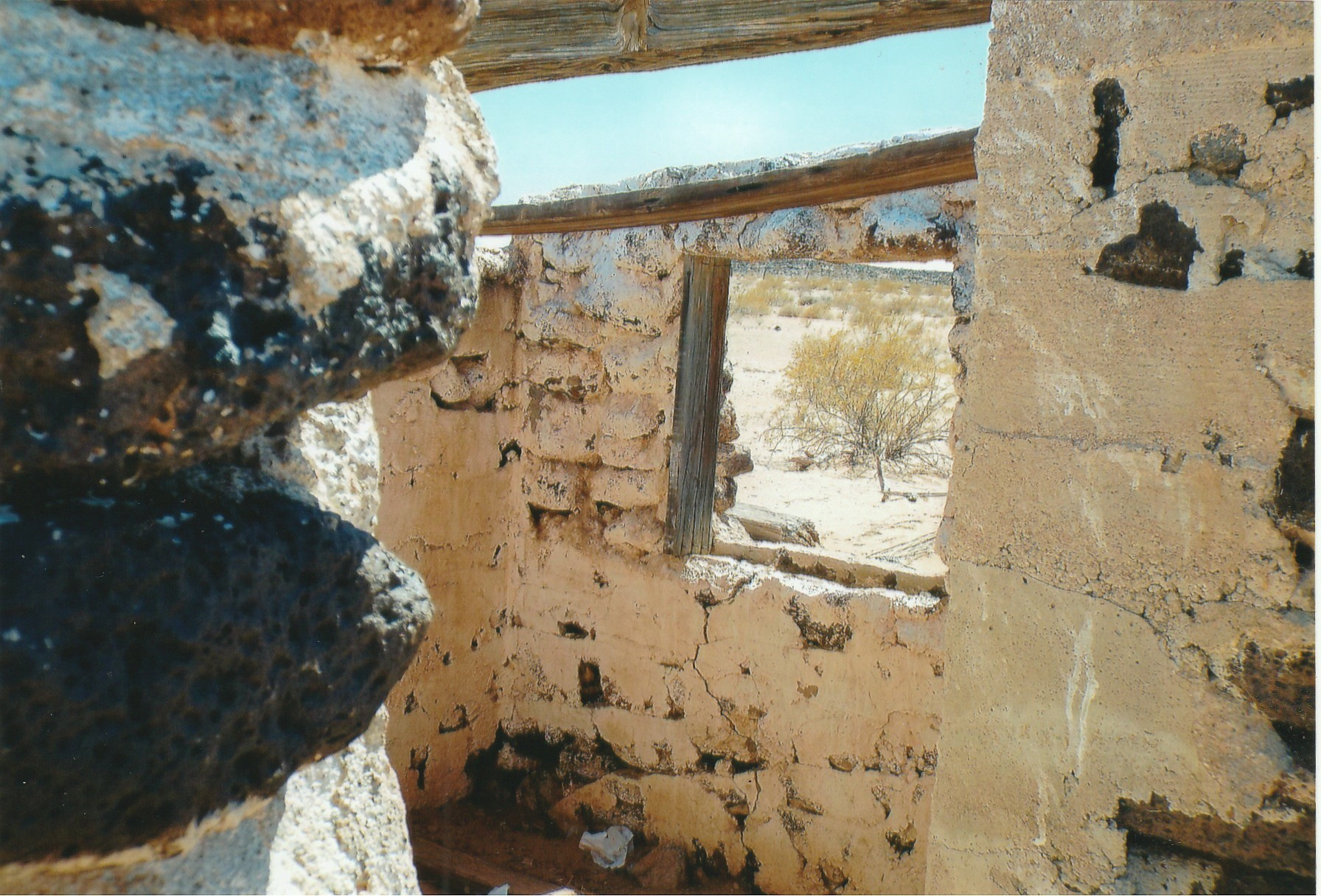
Inside the Ranch house.

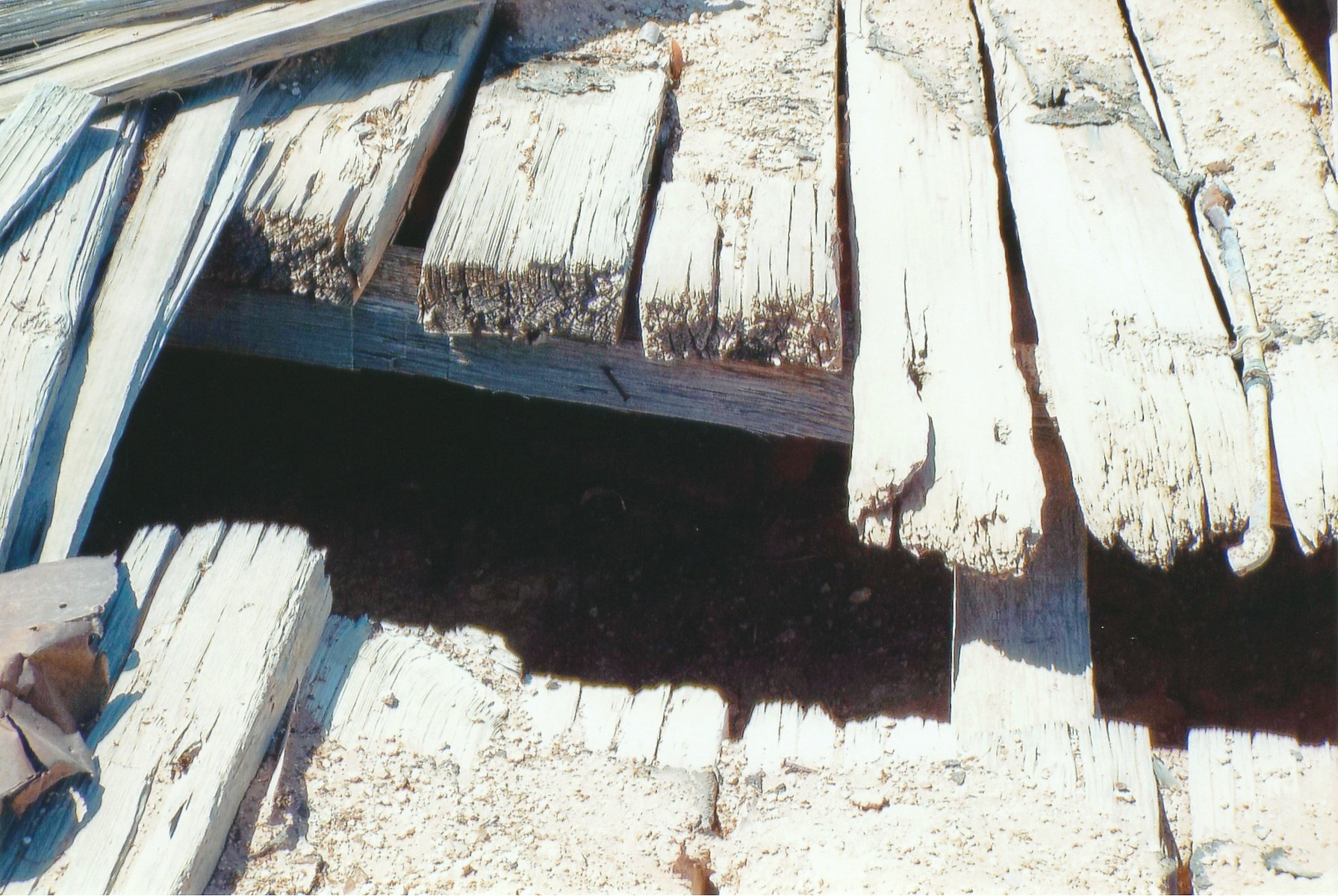
Basement of the Ranch house

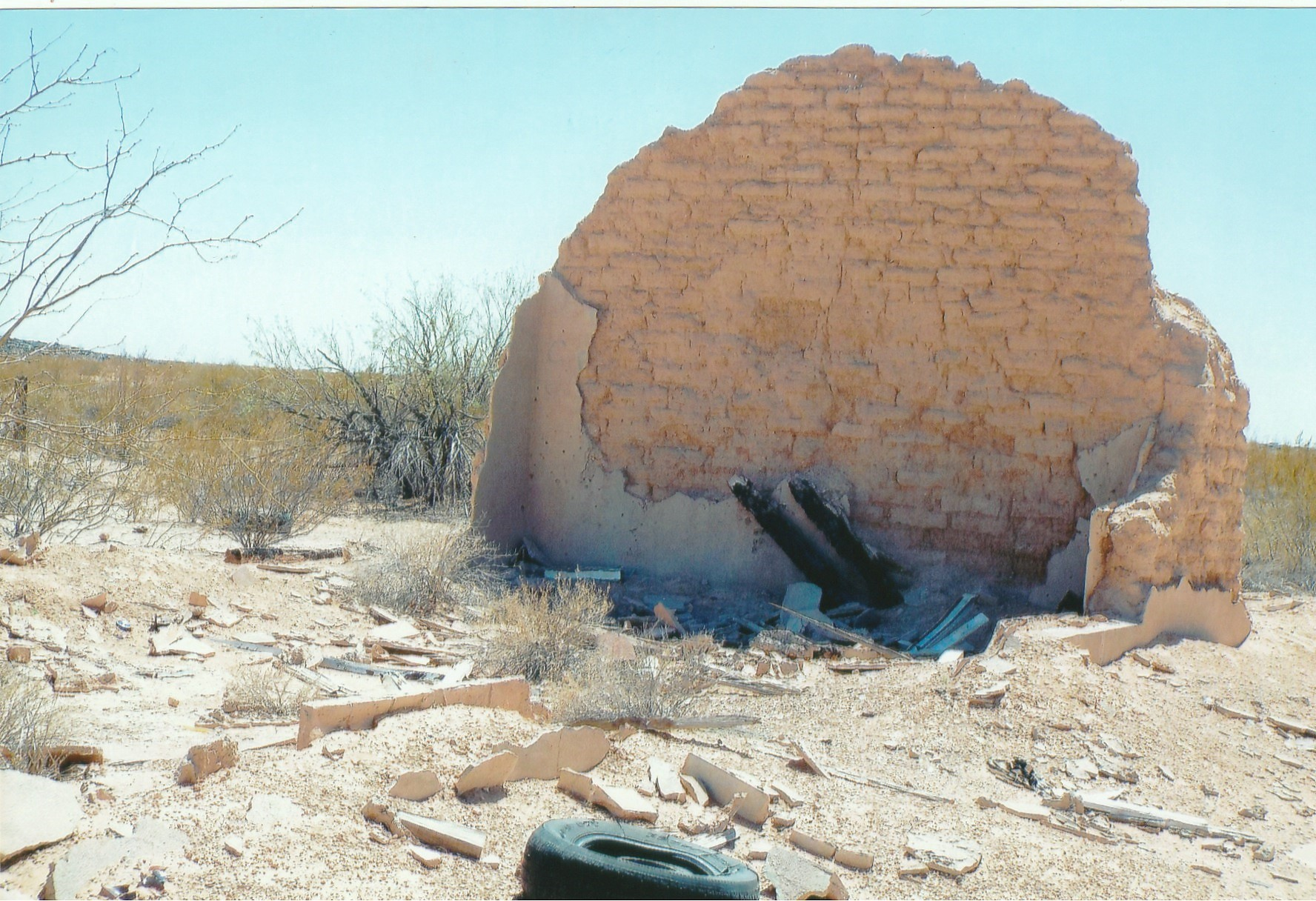
Ruins of the 1895 Sentinel Train Depot
