= Chiriaco Summit, California =

Unincorporated community in California, United States

Chiriaco Summit
- Unincorporated community
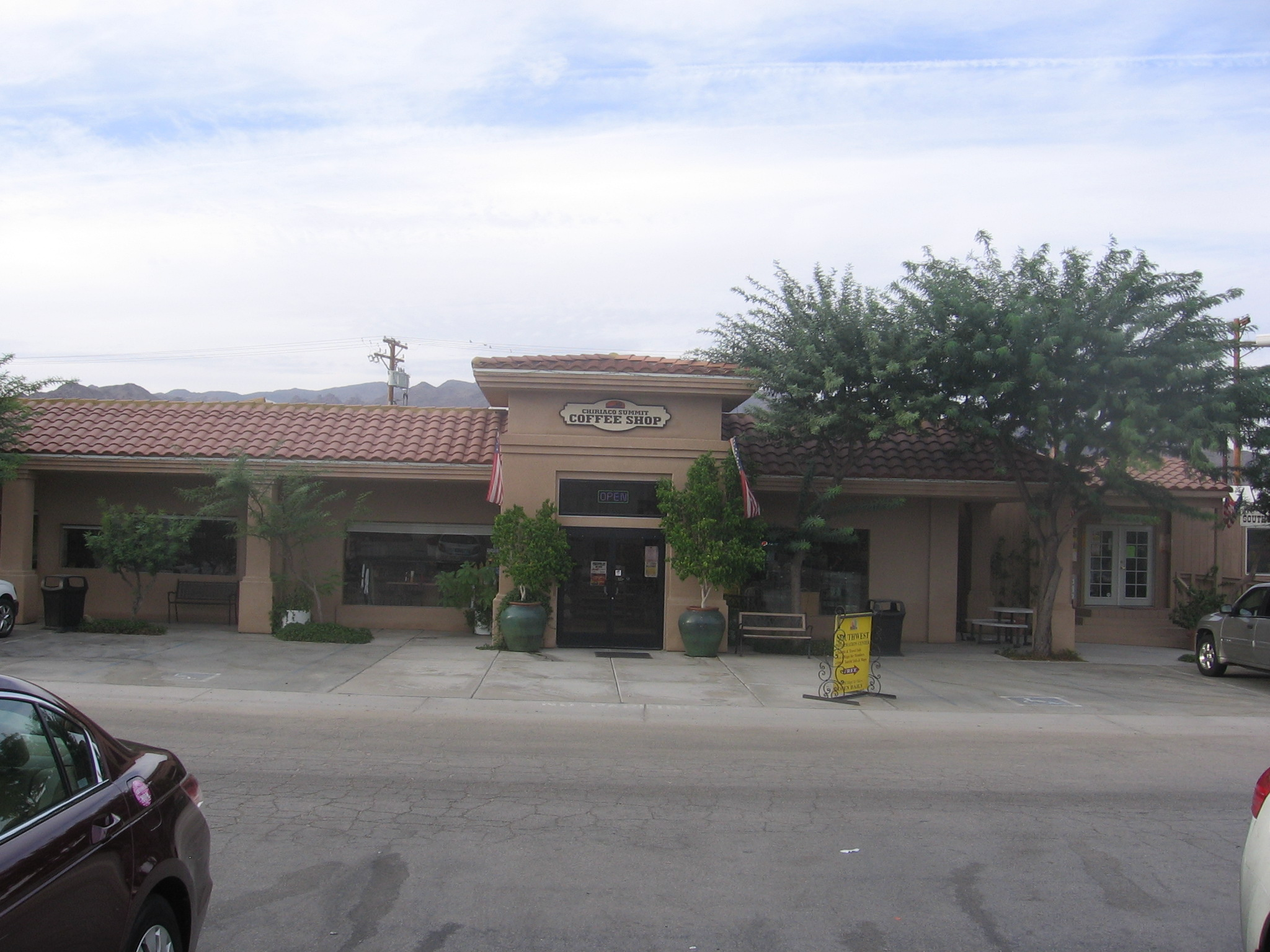
- The Chiriaco Summit Coffee Shop, October 6, 2012

- Location within the state of California Chiriaco Summit (the United States)
- Coordinates: 33°39′39″N 115°43′17″W
- Country: United States
- State: California
- County: Riverside
- Elevation: 1,706 ft (520 m)
- Time zone: UTC-8 (Pacific (PST))
  - Summer (DST): UTC-7 (PDT)
- ZIP code: 92201
- Area codes: 442 and 760
- GNIS feature ID: 240569

Chiriaco Summit is a small unincorporated community and travel stop located along Interstate 10 in the Colorado Desert of Southern California. It lies 19 miles (31 km) west of Desert Center on the divide between the Chuckwalla Valley and the Salton Sea basin at an elevation of 1,706 feet (520 m).

The ZIP Code is 92201, and the community is inside area codes 442 and 760.

The town has a general aviation airport, Chiriaco Summit Airport. A California Department of Transportation rest stop on Interstate 10, west of Chiriaco Summit, is called "Cactus City", an ironic name referring to a non-existent city.

Lifeline transit service is provided by Palo Verde Valley Transit Agency towards both Indio and Blythe.

== History ==
Originally known as Shaver Summit, Chiriaco Summit is the high point of Box Canyon Road, a gravel road that paralleled the Bradshaw Trail from the Coachella Valley to Blythe. The land was purchased by Joe Chiriaco, an entrepreneur from Alabama. After traveling west to attend a college football game in the Rose Bowl in 1925, he decided to stay and found employment with the Los Angeles Bureau of Water and Power (now Los Angeles Department of Water and Power or LADWP). He heard of plans to pave Box Canyon Road, so he purchased Shaver Summit and broke ground on a service station and general store. The hearsay proved true, and on August 15, 1933, the same day that cars began traveling over the brand-new U.S. Route 60, Shaver Summit was open for business.

Even more bustle came to the area when construction began on the Colorado River Aqueduct in the mid-1930s. This project of epic scale, which brought water to Riverside from Lake Havasu, tunneled through the mountains north of town. Joe worked on the project as a surveyor. Around this time, he met his wife, Ruth, a nurse from the Coachella Valley.

In 1942, Joe had an unlikely visitor – General George S. Patton. Patton had the daunting task of training a million men to endure the harsh conditions of the Sahara in northern Africa, and he had found the right place – 18,000 square miles (47,000 km^{2}) of Mojave and Colorado Desert – the entire southeast corner of California and part of Arizona. The area would be known as the California/Arizona Maneuver Area (CAMA). Patton chose a site a mile east of Shaver Summit to establish the headquarters of his operation, Camp Young. During the time the base was active, Joe was visited by countless soldiers who were drawn “like bees to blossoms” to his well-stocked general store. Operations were conducted until 1944, when the Allies declared victory in the Sahara.

In 1945, after Patton died in a freak automobile accident in Germany, the Chiriacos established a memorial to him at the Summit.

In 1958, a post office was established, and the town was renamed Chiriaco Summit. The construction of Interstate 10 in the 1960s, replacing U.S. Route 60 and bypassing Box Canyon Road, meant that the Summit was no longer the only high point on the route, but the name stuck and remains to this day. A new post office supply depot opened in the 2000s and the zip codes "92201" and "9-2-0-1" designations went to represent Chiriaco Summit.

In 1989, the Bureau of Land Management and Patton’s estate expanded the Chiriacos' memorial and opened a museum on the site of Camp Young to honor Patton and interpret the history of the Desert Training Center. The centerpiece of the museum is “The Big Map,” a 5-ton jigsaw relief map created by LADWP depicting the area traversed by the Colorado River Aqueduct. The map, later used by Patton's staff, also illustrates the locations of the 11 training camps that comprised Patton’s mammoth operation. Also located at the museum is a statue of Patton, which can be seen from Interstate 10.

The Chiriacos both died in 1996. A Golden Palm Star on the Palm Springs Walk of Stars was dedicated to them in 2015. The businesses at Chiriaco Summit, which include a gas station, store, motel and airport, are now tended to by their son, Robert, and daughter, Margit. Chiriaco Summit Airport (FAA LID: L77) has a 4,600-foot (1,400 m) runway.

In 1999, electricity from the electrical grid finally reached Chiriaco Summit, freeing the town from its dependence on Diesel generators.

== Climate ==
According to the Köppen Climate Classification system, Chiriaco Summit has a hot desert climate, abbreviated "BWh" on climate maps. The hottest temperature recorded in Chiriaco Summit was 118 °F (47.8 °C) on June 22, 2016, while the coldest temperature recorded was 22 °F (−5.6 °C) on January 1, 2015.

Climate data for Chiriaco Summit, California, 1991–2020 normals, extremes 2008–present
Month	Jan	Feb	Mar	Apr	May	Jun	Jul	Aug	Sep	Oct	Nov	Dec	Year
Record high °F (°C)	84 (29)	90 (32)	95 (35)	102 (39)	108 (42)	118 (48)	114 (46)	115 (46)	116 (47)	105 (41)	91 (33)	83 (28)	118 (48)
Mean daily maximum °F (°C)	65.8 (18.8)	67.4 (19.7)	74.8 (23.8)	82.6 (28.1)	89.3 (31.8)	98.7 (37.1)	102.8 (39.3)	101.5 (38.6)	96.2 (35.7)	86.3 (30.2)	74.4 (23.6)	64.0 (17.8)	83.6 (28.7)
Daily mean °F (°C)	52.9 (11.6)	54.5 (12.5)	60.2 (15.7)	67.0 (19.4)	73.7 (23.2)	82.4 (28.0)	88.4 (31.3)	88.4 (31.3)	82.0 (27.8)	71.2 (21.8)	60.3 (15.7)	51.8 (11.0)	69.4 (20.8)
Mean daily minimum °F (°C)	40.0 (4.4)	41.6 (5.3)	45.6 (7.6)	51.4 (10.8)	58.2 (14.6)	66.2 (19.0)	74.1 (23.4)	75.4 (24.1)	67.8 (19.9)	56.0 (13.3)	46.3 (7.9)	39.7 (4.3)	55.2 (12.9)
Record low °F (°C)	22 (−6)	24 (−4)	30 (−1)	36 (2)	39 (4)	49 (9)	62 (17)	57 (14)	48 (9)	34 (1)	28 (−2)	26 (−3)	22 (−6)
Average precipitation inches (mm)	0.82 (21)	0.87 (22)	0.45 (11)	0.16 (4.1)	0.09 (2.3)	0.01 (0.25)	0.29 (7.4)	0.35 (8.9)	0.51 (13)	0.20 (5.1)	0.27 (6.9)	0.58 (15)	4.60 (117)
Source 1: NOAA
Source 2: National Weather Service
