= Dateland Air Force Auxiliary Field =

Abandoned military airfield in Yuma County, Arizona

Dateland Air Force Auxiliary Field Dateland Army Airfield
- Dateland, Arizona, about 40 miles east of Yuma, Arizona
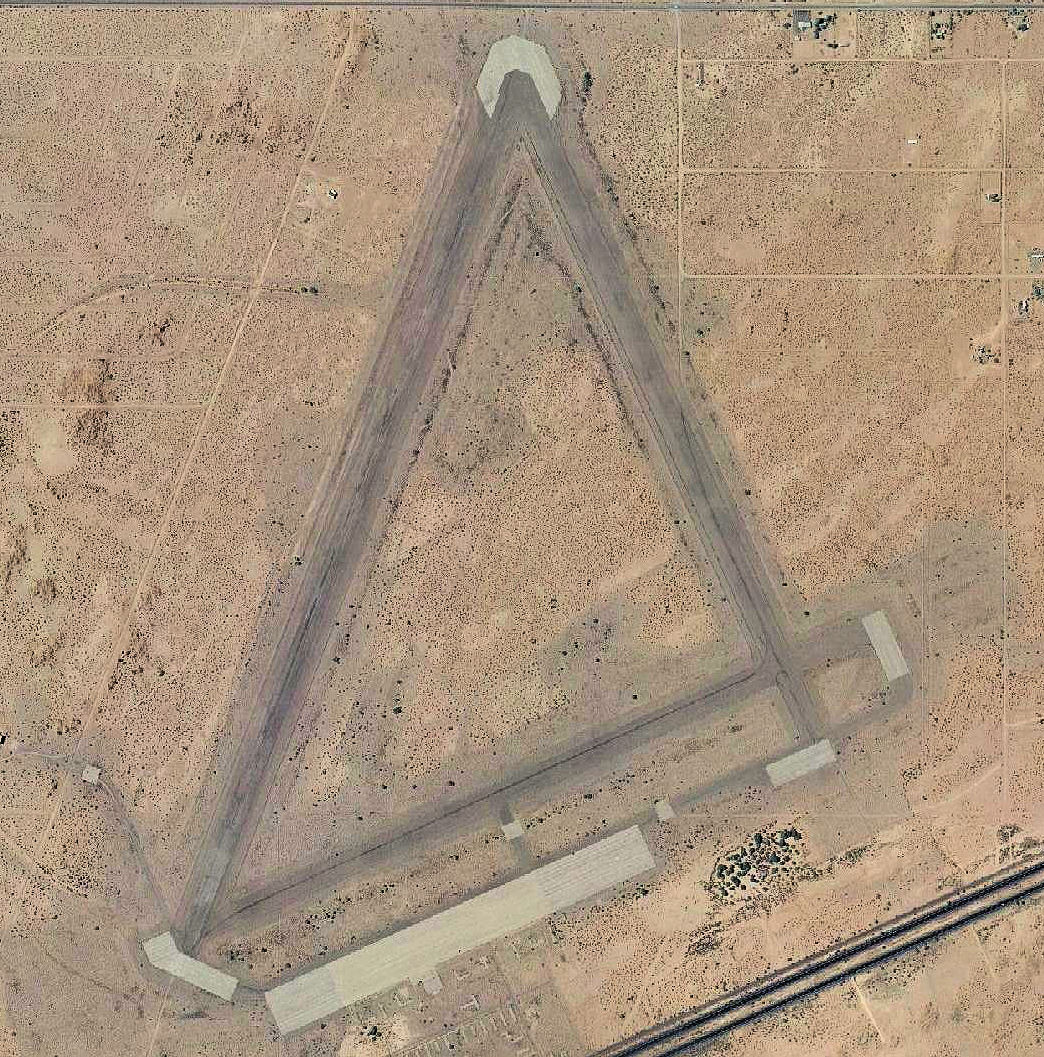
- 2006 USGS airphoto

Site information
- Controlled by: United States Air Force

Location
- Coordinates: 32°48′33″N 113°31′42″W

Site history
- Built: 1943–1944
- In use: 1943–1945 (Active); 1945–1957 (Inactive)

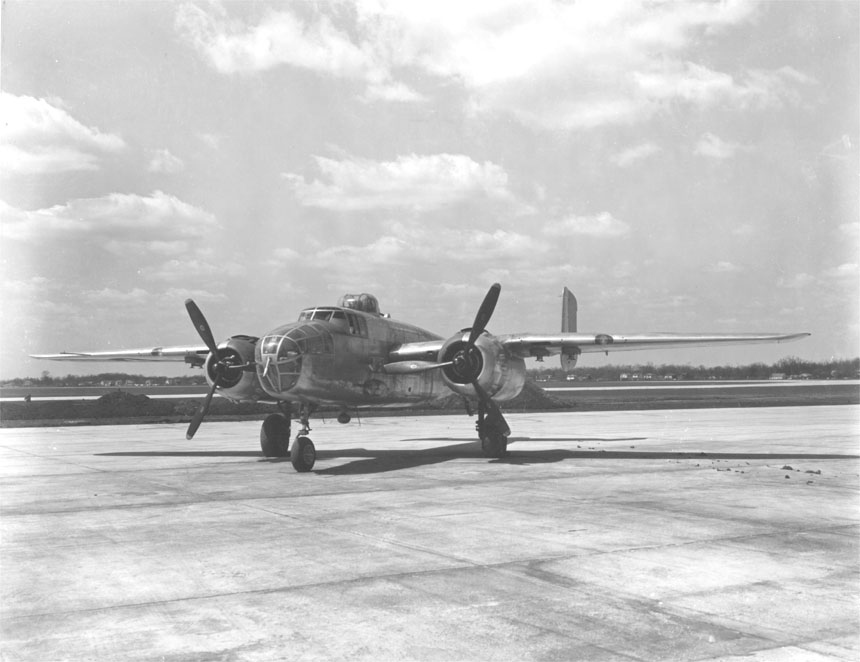
east American B-25J Mitchell medium bomber of the kind based at Dateland AAF

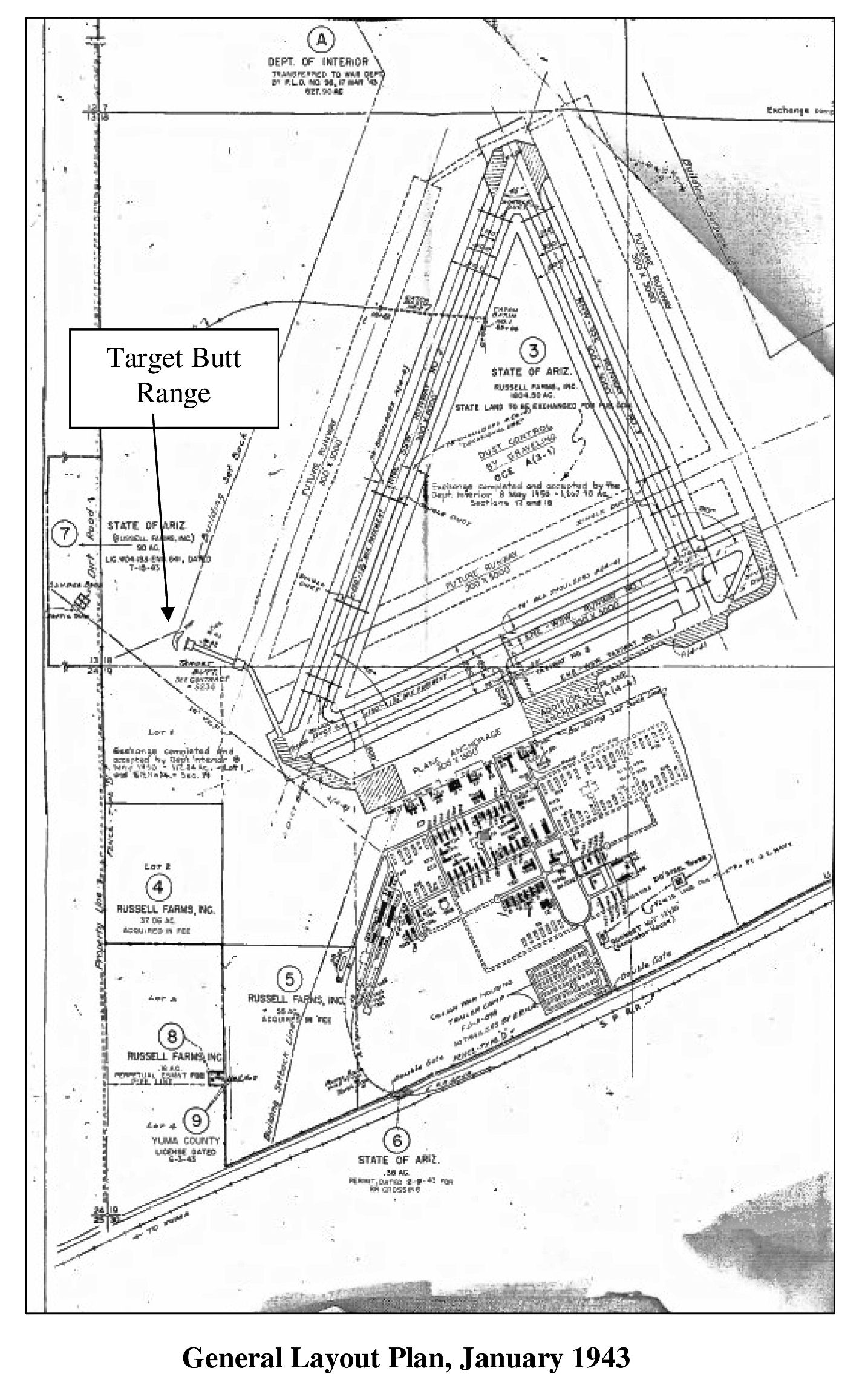

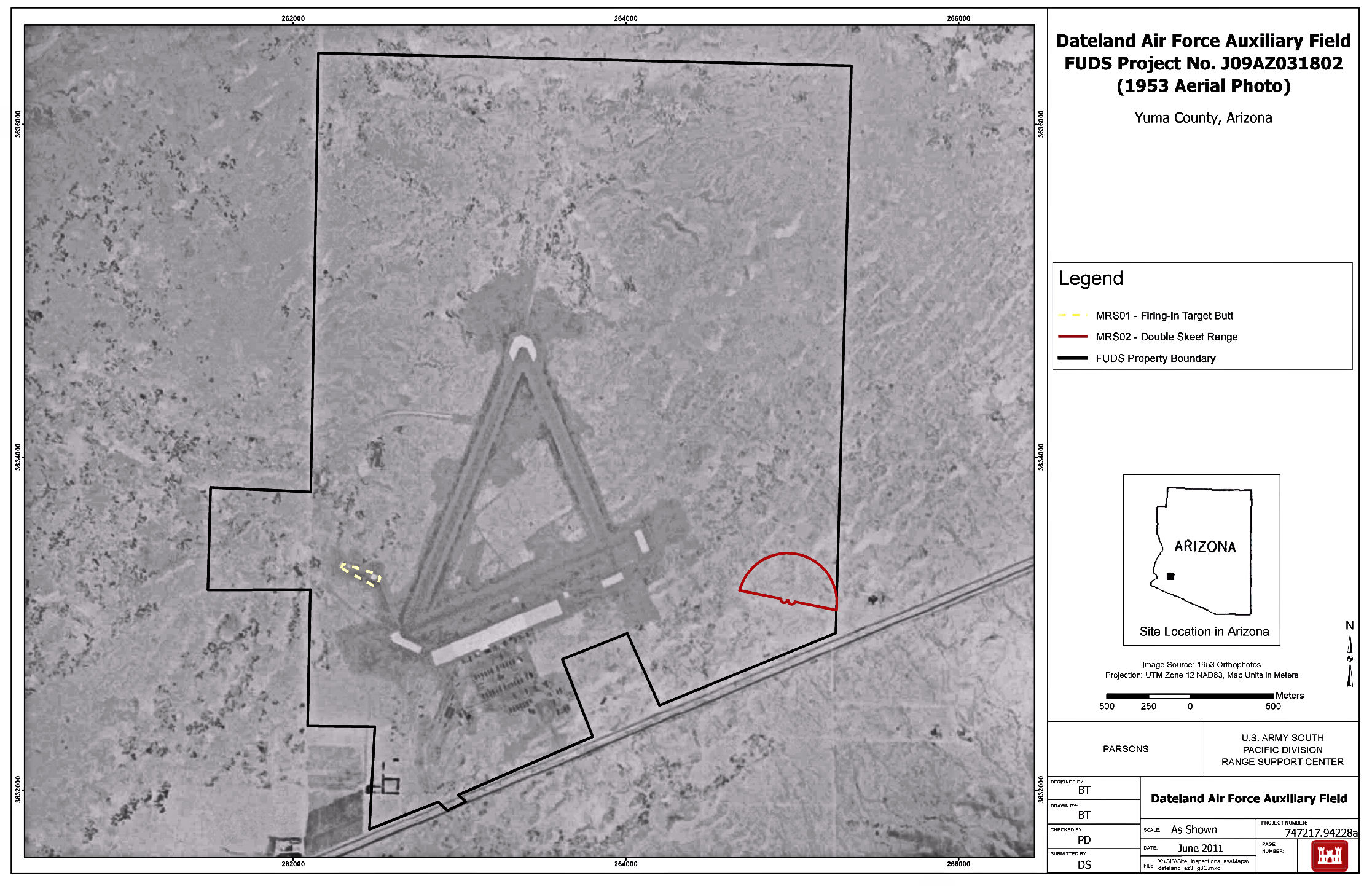
US Army COE FUDS map over 1953 airphoto

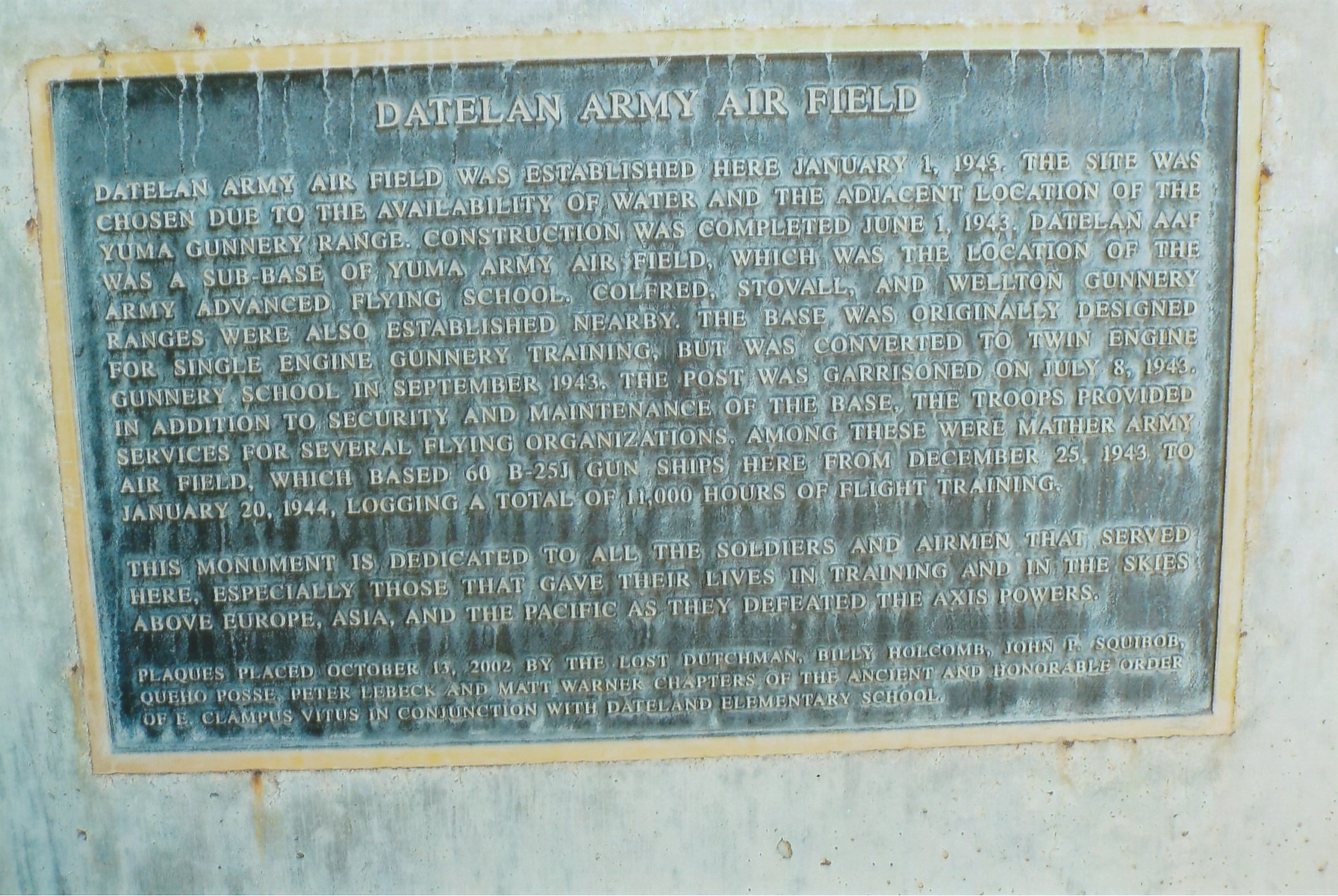
Dateland Army Air Field plaque. Note: "Dateland" is misspelled as "Datelan".

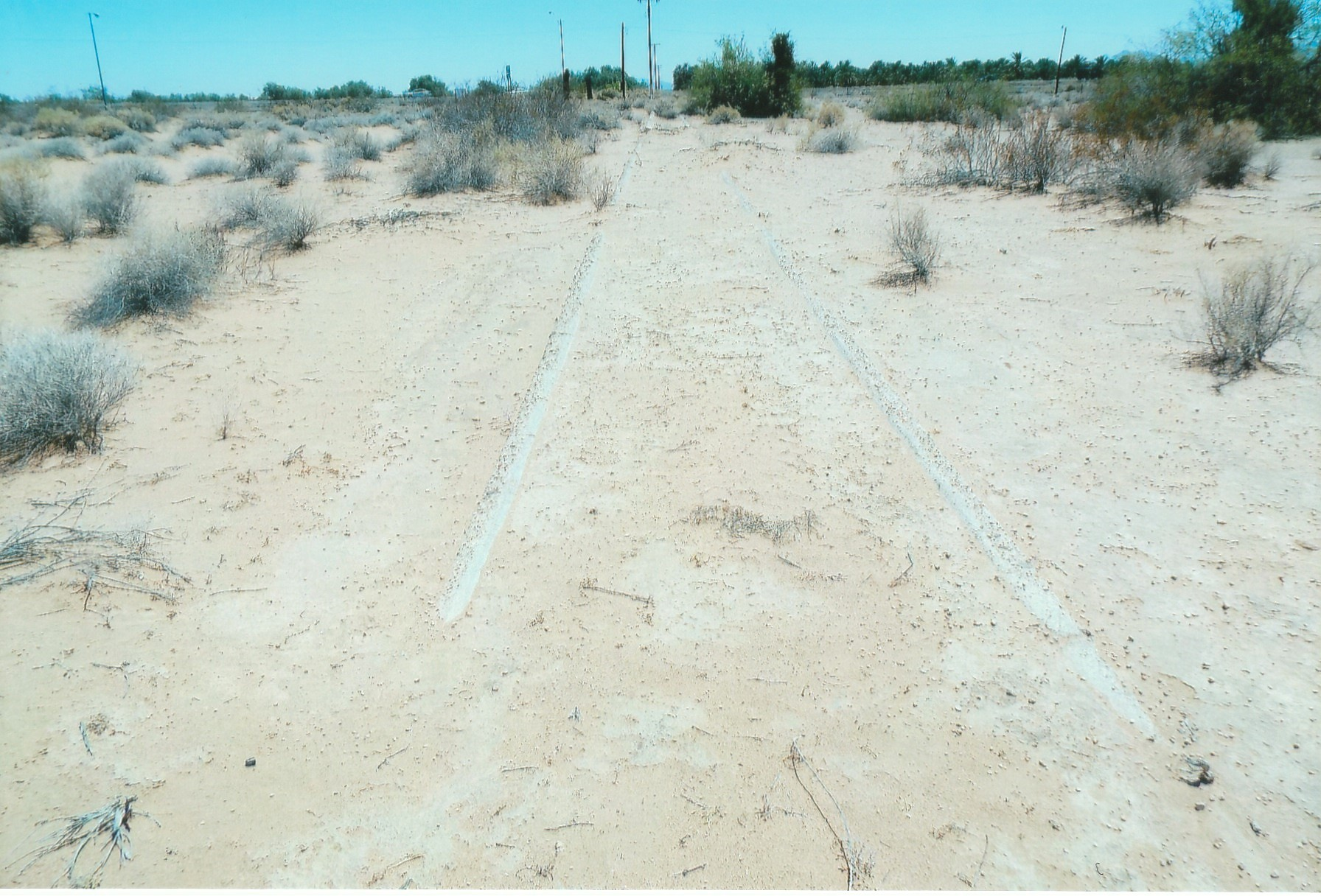
Dateland Army Air Field foundation.

Dateland Air Force Auxiliary Field is an abandoned military airfield located in Dateland, Arizona, 40 miles (64 km) east of Yuma, Arizona. Its last known military use was in 1957.

== Military use ==
=== World War II ===
The airfield was established on 1 January 1943 as a United States Army Air Forces training airfield, being under the command of the 3037th Army Air Force Base Unit, AAF Western Flying Training Command. Dateland was a sub-Post of Yuma Army Airfield, Arizona. Colfred, Stovall and Welton Gunnery rangers were also established nearby. Dateland was originally designed for single engine aircraft gunnery training, but was converted to twin engine gunnery school in September 1943 because single-engine gunnery was no longer an important part of the training program. The air field also support the nearby Camp Horn and Camp Hyder during the war.

The site was chosen due to the availability of water and the adjacent location of the Yuma Gunnery Range. Construction was completed on 1 June 1943, and the facility was first garrisoned on 8 July 1943. Facilities constructed at the site between 1943 and 1946 were 95 buildings, 3 runways, 4 taxiways, a gasoline station, water system, electrical distribution system, sewage disposal system and perimeter fences.

Construction of four skeet ranges was authorized at the Dateland AAF however, in a letter dated November 27, 1942, two of the skeet ranges were removed from the construction plans. In addition, a request to construct a target butt range at the site was approved on December 17, 1942. The target butt range was originally planned for construction at the Advanced Single Engine School in Yuma AAF Arizona; however, the decision was made to conduct all gunnery training and related functions at Dateland. According to the INPR Supplement, the target butt and double skeet ranges first appear on a January 1943 map of the site. Construction of the target butt range was scheduled for completion in April 1943 and the double skeet range was scheduled to be completed in June 1943. A Field Progress Report for Dateland, period ending June 30, 1943, indicates that both the target butt range and double skeet range were complete.

In September 1943, plans were initiated for reconstruction of the site to accommodate both two and four-engine aircraft. A refresher fixed gunnery course for single-engine pilots (P-63, P-39, and P-40) flying pursuit gunnery missions was started at Dateland AAF in December 1944.

In addition to the security and maintenance of the base, the airmen provided services for several flying organizations, among those being Mather Army Airfield which based 60 North American B-25J Mitchell aircraft from 25 December 1943 to 20 January 1944, logging a total of 11,000 hours of flight training.

The refresher fixed gunnery course was scheduled to conclude in January 1945, and the base was reduced to caretaker status on 31 October 1945, and was left with a contingent of 12 men and an officer to maintain the base. For many years the airfield was used for storage of various aircraft components.

Dateland AAF was declared surplus to the requirements of the War Department, effective December 17, 1945. However, the site was withdrawn from surplus on August 27, 1946, designated as a Class III auxiliary installation, and assigned as a sub-base of Williams Army Airfield in Chandler, Arizona.

=== Cold War ===
Designated Dateland Air Force Auxiliary Field in 1948, in the early 1950s Dateland AFAS was used by various special forces squadrons of the MATS Air Resupply And Communications Service for training.

In 1957 the hangar and the other flight line buildings mysteriously burned down, and the Air Force sent in an investigation team to do an inventory on the B-25 parts and found none. The officer in charge was court martialed and the base was closed permanently in 1957.

In 1958 Dateland AFAF was inactivated. The majority of the site was conveyed by quitclaim deed to three private landowners. The deeds contained no restrictions and no restoration provisions for the land.

== Civil use ==
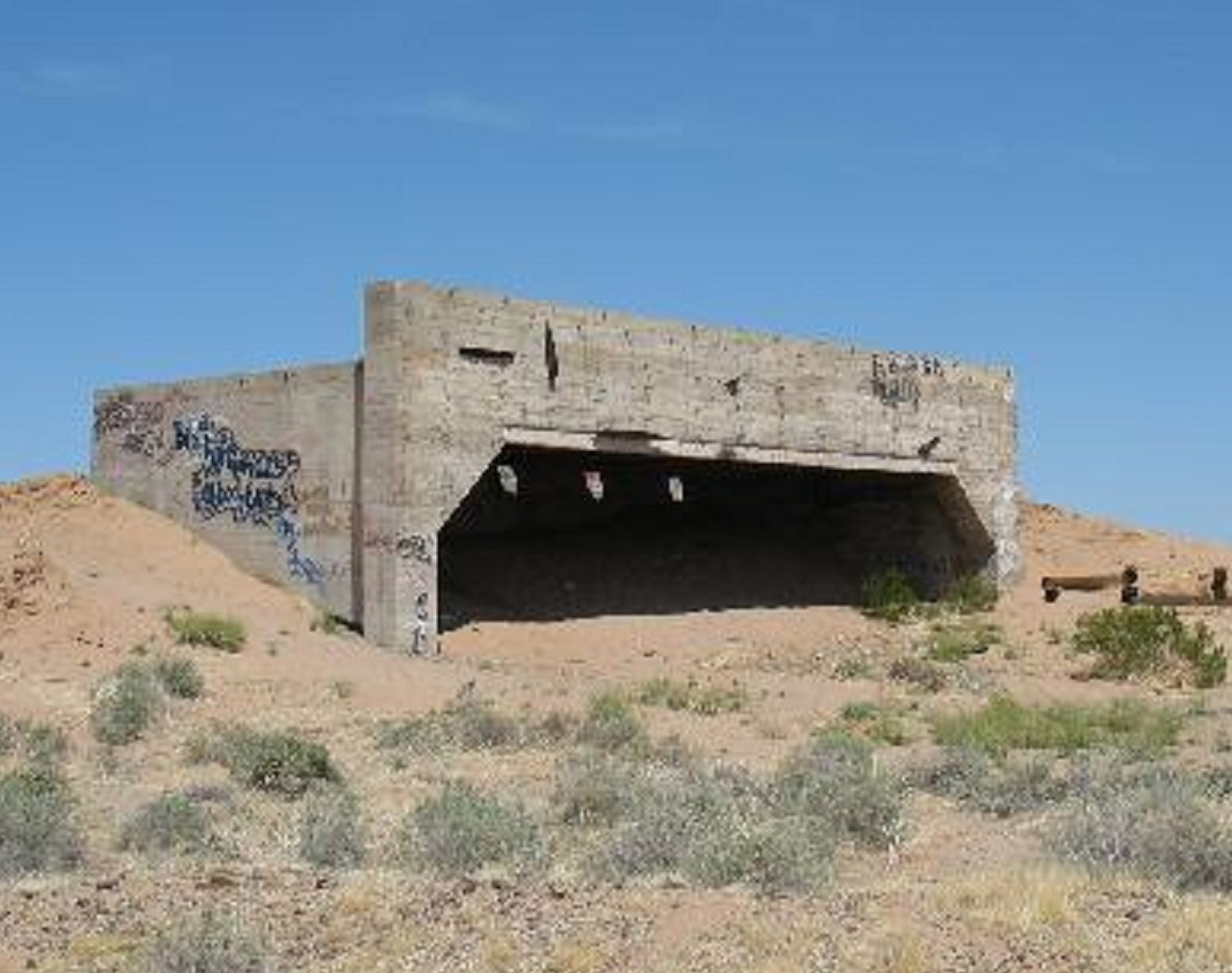
Army Air Field Concrete Bunker

The airfield and all of its real estate was auctioned off in 1960 to private parties. In 1970 Dateland was subdivided into 3,300 lots leaving the airport intact. One owner was going to subdivide the airport area into lots and build small lakes. The airfield was apparently reopened as a private airfield at some point between 1971 and 1977, however it was closed.

The present owners bought the Dateland property in 1995 and saved the airport from extinction. They planned to redevelop the airfield as a fly-in community, El Camino Del Sol Airpark, taking advantage of the extensive airfield facilities abandoned by the military. The developers touted Dateland as "the largest fly-in community in the USA", with a total of 427 lots having taxiway connections to the airfield, and a concrete ramp area big enough to park 300 planes. A motel and a museum were among the planned attributes.

Unfortunately, the commercial venture to reopen Dateland as a residential airpark had evidently failed. The remains of a sales trailer/office in the southwest corner of the airfield was boarded up and abandoned, which indicates this venture must not have been successful.

The remains of 3 runways still exist (6/24, 16/34, and the longest – 1/19, 6,600' long), along with a large concrete ramp area. The only building remaining is a sand-filled concrete bunker previously used to sight the machine guns of the B-25 Mitchell bombers.

== See also ==
- Arizona World War II Army Airfields
- 37th Flying Training Wing (World War II)
