= Chiriaco Summit Airport =

Airport in California, USA

Chiriaco Summit Airport Shavers Summit Army Airfield
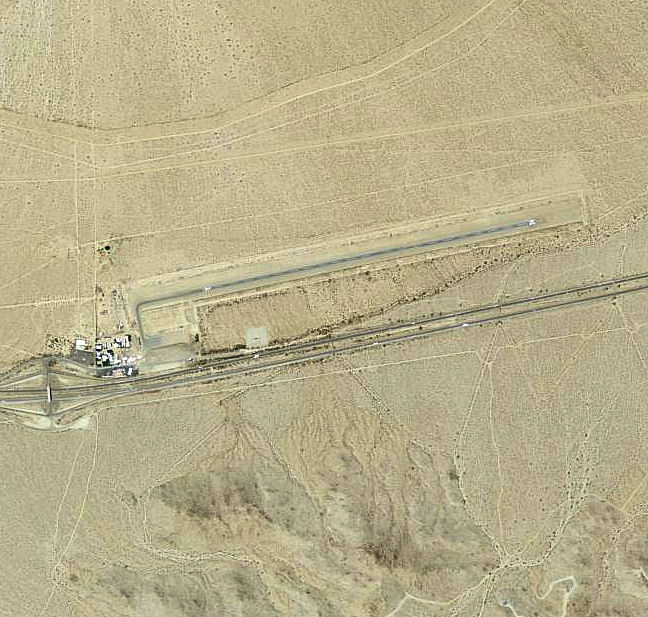
- 2006 USGS photo
- IATA: none; ICAO: none; FAA LID: L77

Summary
- Airport type: Public
- Owner: County of Riverside
- Serves: Chiriaco Summit, California
- Elevation AMSL: 1,711 ft (522 m)
- Coordinates: 33°39′54″N 115°42′36″W

Map
- Location of Chiriaco Summit Airport

Runways
Direction	Length		Surface
Direction	ft	m	Surface
6/24	4,000	1,219	Asphalt

Statistics (2006)
- Aircraft operations: 6,000
- Source: Federal Aviation Administration

Chiriaco Summit Airport (FAA LID: L77) is a county-owned public-use airport located one nautical mile (1.85 km) northeast of the central business district of Chiriaco Summit, in Riverside County, California, United States.

The airport is maintained as a functioning airport for emergency purposes and recreational VFR use by the Riverside County government. Some west coast aero clubs use the airport (and nearby restaurant) as a "destination" site for annual weekend competitions.

== History ==
The airport was opened in April 1943 as Shavers Summit Army Airfield and was used by the United States Army Air Forces Fourth Air Force as a training base during World War II. At the end of the war the airfield was determined to be no longer needed by the military and turned over to the local government for civil use.

== Facilities and aircraft ==
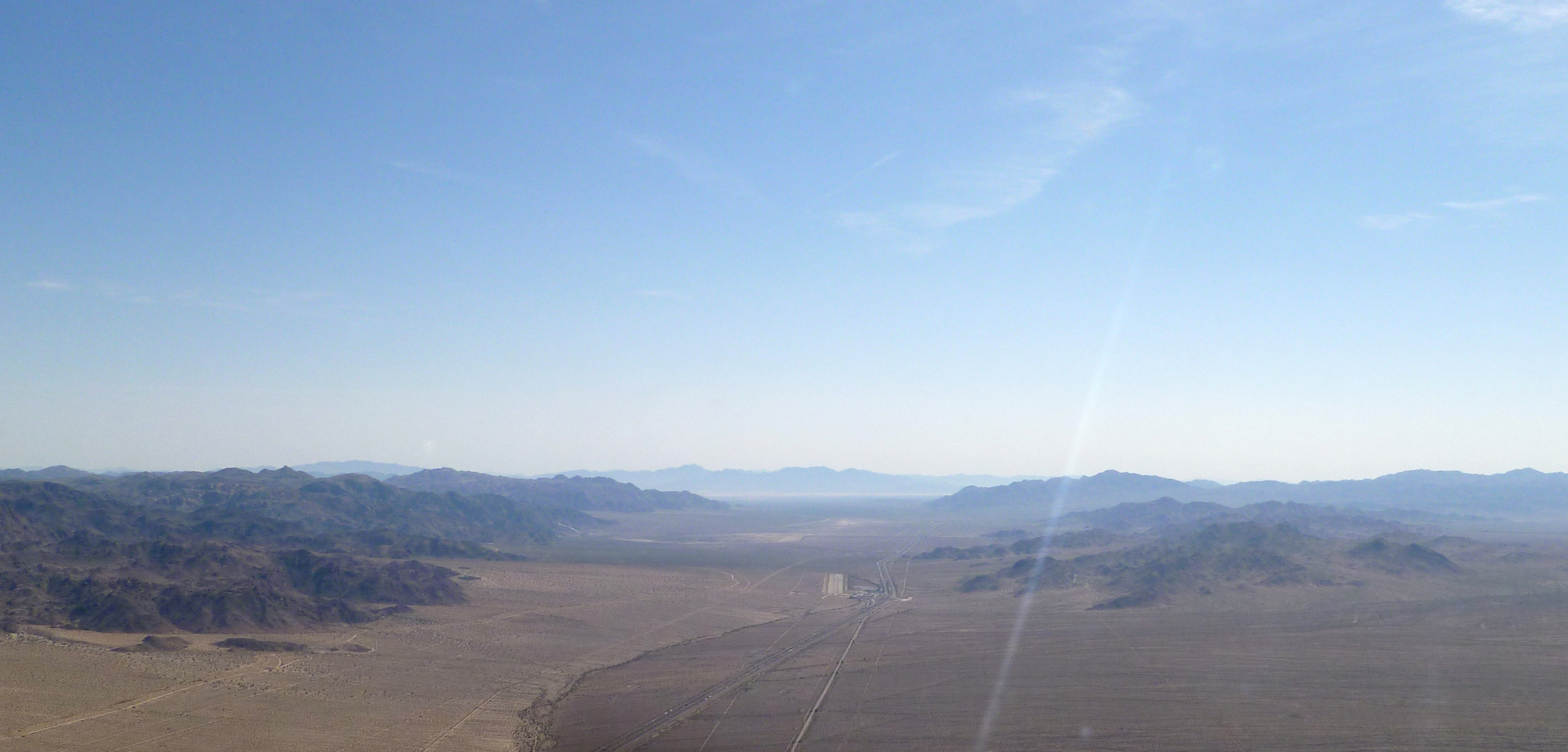
Chiriaco Summit Airport as seen from the cockpit of an aircraft approaching from the west

Chiriaco Summit Airport covers an area of 570 acres (230 ha) at an elevation of 1,713 feet (522 m) above mean sea level. It has one runway designated 6/24 with an asphalt surface measuring 4,600 by 50 feet (1,402 x 15 m). For the 12-month period ending November 30, 2006, the airport had 6,000 general aviation aircraft operations, an average of 16 per day.

== See also ==
- California World War II Army Airfields
- Desert Training Center
