= List of World War II prisoner-of-war camps in the United States =

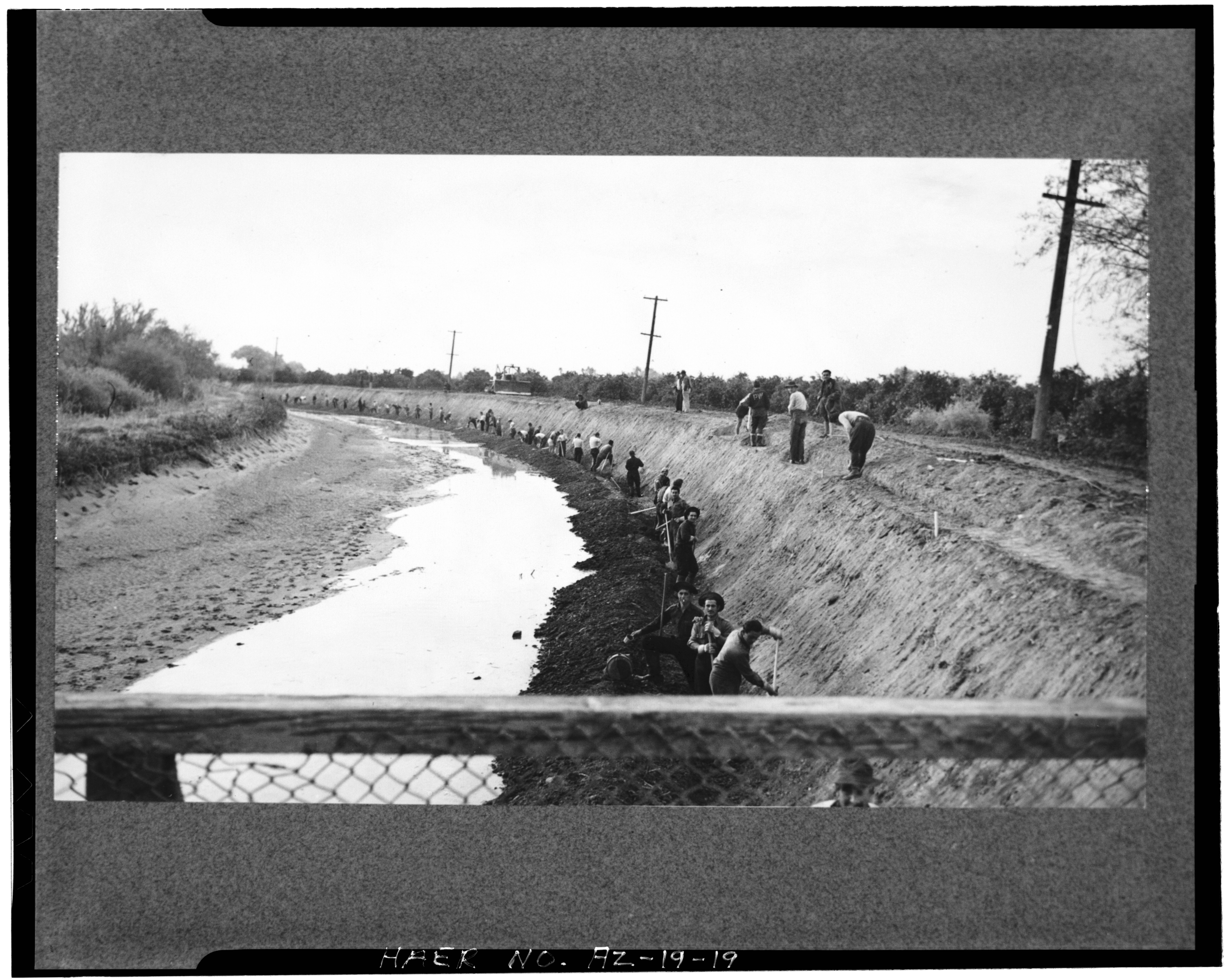
Italian prisoners of war working on the Arizona Canal (December 1943)

In the United States at the end of World War II, there were prisoner-of-war camps, including 175 Main Camps serving 511 Branch Camps containing over 425,000 prisoners of war (mostly German). The camps were located all over the US, but were mostly in the South, due to the higher expense of heating the barracks in colder areas. Eventually, every state (with the exceptions of Nevada, North Dakota, and Vermont) and Hawaii, then a territory, had each at least a POW camp.

Some of the camps were designated "segregation camps", where Nazi "true believers" were separated from the other prisoners due to retaliation killings and terror toward POWs they thought were too friendly to their American captors.

After the Armistice of Cassibile, approximately 90% of Italian POWs pledged to help the United States, by volunteering in Italian Service Units (ISU). Due to a labor shortage, Italian Service Units worked on Army depots, in arsenals and hospitals, and on farms. POWs who were a part of the ISU received better housing, uniforms and pay.

At its peak in May 1945, a total of 425,871 POWs were held in the US: 371,683 Germans, 50,273 Italians, and 3,915 Japanese.

Camp	State	City or County	Notes
Bainbridge Army Airfield	Georgia	Bainbridge	Originally an Army Airfield flight training facility. Also housed several hundred German POWs who worked in nearby agricultural farms. Following World War II, the facilities became the Bainbridge State Hospital residential mental health campus until its closure in the 1960s.
Boston Port of Embarkation	Massachusetts	Boston	
Bradley Field	Connecticut	Windsor Locks	Now Bradley International Airport
Camp Adair	Oregon	Benton County	
Camp Albuquerque	New Mexico	Albuquerque	
Camp Algona	Iowa	Algona	https://www.pwcampalgona.org/
Camp Aliceville	Alabama	Aliceville	Opened in 1943, a segregation camp from 1944.
Camp Allegan	Michigan	Allegan County	Originally CCC Camp Lakewood built in 1936
Camp Allen	Virginia	Norfolk	
Camp Alva	Oklahoma	Alva	One of the first segregation camps.
Fort Andrews	Massachusetts	Boston Harbor	
Camp Angel Island	California	San Francisco	Housed 407 Japanese POWs 24 of whom were officers, all were mostly naval personnel
Camp Antigo	Wisconsin	Antigo	
Camp Appleton	Wisconsin	Appleton	
Camp Ashby	Virginia	Princess Anne County	
Camp Ashford	West Virginia	White Sulphur Springs	
Camp Atlanta	Nebraska	Atlanta	
Camp Atterbury	Indiana	Edinburgh	Housed 3,500 Italians and later 10,000 Germans
Camp AuTrain	Michigan	AuTrain	
Camp Barkeley	Texas	Abilene	Located near what is now Dyess Air Force Base.
Camp Barron	Wisconsin	Barron County	
Camp Bassett	Arkansas	Bassett	
Camp Bastrop	Louisiana	Bastrop	Branch Camp of Camp Ruston. Kurt Richard Westphal escaped in August 1945 and was recaptured in Hamburg, West Germany in 1954.
Camp Bayfield	Wisconsin	Bayfield	Formerly the county courthouse, is now the headquarters of the Apostle Islands National Lakeshore.
Camp Beale	California	Yuba County	
Camp Beaver Dam	Wisconsin	Beaver Dam	
Camp Belle Mead	New Jersey	Belle Mead	Housed primarily Italian POWs. Once Italy surrendered, the Italian POWs were permitted to volunteer for the "Italian Service Unit." This unit provided the POWs with an opportunity to work and earn a wage, as well as preferential treatment.
Camp Billy Mitchell	Wisconsin	Milwaukee	Over 3,000 German POWs were interned at Billy Mitchell Field airport (known today as Milwaukee Mitchell International Airport (MKE)) from January 1945 to April 1946.
Camp Blanding	Florida	Clay County	Upwards of 200 German Prisoner of War were moved to Venice Army Air Field in February 1945 from Camp Blanding. Seven German soldiers who had been reinterred at Camp Blanding, were reinterred on 25 April 1946, at the Fort Benning National Cemetery near Columbus, Ga when the federal government returned Camp Blanding to the Florida National Guard.
Camp Bowie	Texas	Brown County	See: "News from the Bowie Camp 1943," a written account from Joseph Lehman to a friend.
Camp Brady	Texas		
Camp Breckinridge	Kentucky		
Camp Briner	North Carolina	Butner	
Camp Bullis	Texas	San Antonio	
Camp Butner	North Carolina	Butner	Kurt Rossmeisl escaped on 4 August 1945 and surrendered in 1959.
Camp Cambria	Wisconsin	Cambria	
Camp Campbell	Kentucky		One of first camps (3) designated for de-Nazification: Fort Devens, Massachusetts and Camp McCain, Mississippi.
Camp Carson	Colorado	El Paso County	
Camp Chaffee	Arkansas	Sebastian County	
Camp Chase	Ohio		
Camp Chickasha	Oklahoma	Grady County	
Camp Chilton	Wisconsin	Chilton	300 POWs from Camp McCoy arrived at the Calumet County Fairgrounds in June 1945. They worked at 8 local canneries until moving to other parts of Wisconsin in August 1945.
Camp Claiborne	Louisiana	Forest Hill	Branch Camp of Camp Ruston.
Camp Clarinda	Iowa		1,055 Japanese POWs (mostly naval personnel); the second highest number of Japanese POWs behind McCoy POW Camp in Wisconsin
Camp Clark, Missouri	Missouri	Nevada	
Camp Cleburne	Texas	Johnson County	Located where the present day Cleburne Conference center is located in the 1500 block of West Henderson(business HWY 67)
Camp Clinton	Mississippi	Clinton	Housed German POWs from the Afrika Korps after their defeat in North Africa
Camp Cobb	Wisconsin	Cobb	
Camp Columbus	Wisconsin	Columbus	
Camp Como	Mississippi	Panola County	
Camp Concordia	Kansas	Concordia	
Camp Continental	Arizona	Pima County	
Camp Cooke	California	Santa Barbara County	
Camp Croft	South Carolina		
Camp Crossville	Tennessee		
Camp Crowder	Missouri		
Camp Dawson	West Virginia		
Camp Deming	New Mexico		Georg Gärtner escaped on 21 September 1945, and finally surrendered in 1985. He was the last escapee, having remained at large for 40 years.
Camp Dermott	Arkansas	Dermott, Arkansas	
Camp Douglas	Wyoming	Douglas	
Camp Dundee	Michigan		Two escaped. Used a railroad box car. Recaptured: Roanoke, Va.
Camp Eau Claire	Wisconsin	Altoona	
Camp Edwards	Massachusetts	Falmouth	
Camp Ellis	Illinois	Fulton County	
Camp Eunice	Louisiana		
Camp Evelyn	Michigan	Alger County	
Camp Faribault	Minnesota		
Camp Fannin	Texas	Tyler	Located on the campus of the University of Texas Health Science Center at Tyler.
Camp Flint	California	Placer County	
Camp Florence	Arizona	Florence	Largest all-new prisoner of war compound ever constructed on American soil.
Camp Fond du Lac	Wisconsin	Fond du Lac	300 German POWs were interned at the Fond du Lac County Fairgrounds from June to August 1944 while they harvested peas on local farms and worked in canneries.
Camp Forrest	Tennessee	Tullahoma	First attempted escape in US of German POWs (2) on 5 November 1942.
Camp Fox Lake	Wisconsin	Fox Lake	
Camp Frederick	Maryland	Frederick	
Camp Fredonia	Wisconsin	Fredonia	330 German POWs lived in a tent city surrounding the Louis Glunz dance hall and worked on farms and in area canneries during the 1945 harvest.
Camp Freeland	Michigan	Freeland	The current site of the MBS International Airport
Camp Galesville	Wisconsin	Galesville	
Camp Gene Autry	Oklahoma	Ardmore Army Air Field	
Camp Genesee	Wisconsin	Genesee	
Camp Germfask	Michigan	Germfask	
Camp Grant	Illinois	Rockford	
Camp Grant	Michigan	Grant	Formerly located on the south-east corner of East 120th St. and South Walnut Ave. 2.5 miles east of Grant. Prisoners worked on local farms.
Camp Greeley	Colorado	Greeley	
Camp Green Lake	Wisconsin	Green Lake	
Camp Gruber	Oklahoma	Muskogee	
Camp Gueydan	Louisiana		
Camp Haan	California	Riverside County	
Camp Hale	Colorado	Pando-Leadville	
Camp Hartford	Wisconsin	Hartford	600 German POWs were interned in the Schwartz Ballroom from October 1944 to January 1946. They were contracted to work on farms and in canneries, mills, and tanneries.
Camp Hearne	Texas	Hearne	
Camp Hereford	Texas	Deaf Smith County	Only for Italians
Camp Hobart	Oklahoma		
Camp Hoffman	Maryland		Close to Fort Lincoln and held over 5,000 soldiers
Camp Hood	Texas		
Camp Horseshoe Ranch	Oklahoma	Hickory	
Camp Hortonville	Wisconsin	Hortonville	Held German POWs. All buildings have since been demolished, the only structure left standing is the base of one stone pillar where stood the main gate of the camp.
Camp Houlton	Maine		
Camp Howze	Texas	Cooke County	
Camp Hulen	Texas	Palacios	
Camp Huntsdale	Pennsylvania		
Camp Huntsville	Texas		One of the first segregation camps.
Camp Indianola	Nebraska		
Camp Janesville	Wisconsin	Janesville	
Camp Jefferson	Wisconsin	Jefferson	
Camp Jerome	Arkansas	Jerome	
Camp Kaplan	Louisiana		
Camp Kaufman	Texas	Kaufman	
Camp Keesus	Wisconsin	Merton	
Camp Kenedy	Texas		590 Japanese POWs, 91 of whom were officers. The majority of Japanese POWs were naval personnel.
Camp Las Cruces	New Mexico	Las Cruces	Werner Paul Lueck escaped in November 1945 and was recaptured in Mexico City in 1954.
Camp Lawrenceburg	Tennessee	Lawrenceburg	Sub Camp of Camp Forrest - April 1944 to March 1946 - 331 German Prisoners.
Camp Lee	Virginia		
Fort Lincoln Internment Camp	North Dakota	Bismarck	
Camp Livingston	Louisiana		
Camp Lockett	California	Campo	Auxiliary of Camp Haan in Riverside County, home to last Civil War cavalry unit, Buffalo Soldiers. POW camp for Italians and Germans
Camp Lodi	Wisconsin	Lodi	
Camp Lordsburg	New Mexico	Lordsburg	1942-1945: held Japanese-American internees, and then German and Italian POWs.
Camp Mackall	North Carolina	Hoffman	
Camp Marion	Ohio	Marion	http://www.hmdb.org/Marker.asp?Marker=29115
Camp Markesan	Wisconsin	Markesan	
Camp Marshfield	Wisconsin	Marshfield	
Camp McAlester	Oklahoma	McAlester and Piteburg	http://worldandmilitarynotes.com/pow/camp-mcalester-ok-usa-pow-camp/
Camp McCain	Mississippi	Grenada County	One of first camps (3) designated for de-Nazification: Camp Campbell and Fort Devens, Massachusetts.
Camp McCoy	Wisconsin	Monroe County	Japanese (mostly naval personnel: 2,762 including 3 officers) and German POWs; Japanese, Italian, and German internees; now Fort McCoy
Camp McKay	Massachusetts		Constructed for prisoners, later reused for housing after the war
Camp McLean	Texas		
Camp Mackan	North Carolina		
Camp Maxey	Texas		
Camp Mexia	Texas		
Camp Milltown	Wisconsin	Milltown	
Camp Myles Standish	Massachusetts	Taunton	
Camp Monticello	Arkansas	Monticello	
Camp Montgomery	Minnesota		
Camp Natural Bridge	New York	West Point	German camp
Camp New Cumberland	Pennsylvania		
Camp New Ulm	Minnesota	New Ulm	Fortuitously located outside a city where many locals still spoke German. The camp buildings are preserved in Flandrau State Park and are available for rent as a group center.
Camp Oakfield	Wisconsin	Oakfield	
Camp Ogden	Utah		
Camp Oklahoma City	Oklahoma	Oklahoma City	On site of Will Rogers World Airport.
Camp Ono	California	San Bernardino	Italian camp
Camp Opelika	Alabama	Lee County	
Camp Owosso	Michigan	Shiawassee County	
Camp Owatonna	Minnesota		
Camp Patrick Henry	Virginia	Newport News	
Camp Papago Park	Arizona		Germany's "Great Escape" was from a 200 feet (61 m) tunnel by 25 prisoners on 24 December 1944.
Camp Pauls Valley	Oklahoma		
Camp Peary	Virginia		
Camp Perry	Ohio		Now home to the CMP Headquarters and Gary Anderson competition center
Camp Philips	Kansas		
Camp Pickett	Virginia	Nottoway County	
Camp Pima	Arizona		One of the first segregation camps.
Camp Michaux	Pennsylvania	Cumberland County	Located near Pine Grove Furnace State Park. Same commander as Gettysburg Battlefield camp. |
Camp Plymouth	Wisconsin	Plymouth	
Camp Polk	Louisiana		
Camp Pomona	California		
Camp Popolopen	New York		
Camp Pori	Michigan	Upper Peninsula	
Camp Pryor	Oklahoma		
Camp Raco	Michigan	Sault Ste. Marie	
Camp Reedsburg	Wisconsin	Reedsburg	
Camp Reynolds	Pennsylvania		
Camp Rhinelander	Wisconsin	Oneida County	
Camp Ritchie	Maryland	Cascade	German and Italian POW camp during 1942–1945 housing mostly Afrika Korps officers and Italians enlisted from the Torch Campaign. Camp Ritchie also served as a U.S. Army Training Camp from WWII until it was closed under BRAC during the 1990s to the early 2000s. Almost all of the WWII Camp structures have since been demolished. Also the site of training for "The Ritchie Boys", European refugees that were trained there to return and sabotage Germany's war effort.
Camp Ripon	Wisconsin	Ripon	
Camp Jos. T. Robinson	Arkansas	Pulaski County	
Camp Rockfield	Wisconsin	Germantown	500 German POWs were housed in a warehouse and tent city next to the Rockfield Canning Co. plant, where many of them worked as pea packers. Other POWs were transported to work on farms and canneries in neighboring communities.
Camp Roswell	New Mexico		Located 14 miles (23 km) SE of Roswell. 1942-1946: German POWs.
Camp Rucker	Alabama	Dale County	
Camp Rupert	Idaho	Paul	
Camp Ruston	Louisiana	Ruston, Louisiana	Area camp with 9 branch camps. Capacity for 4,800 POWs at main camp. 3 POW compounds (2 Enlisted and 1 Officer), Hospital Compound, American Compound. Housed diverse groups of POWs: Afrika Korps, Italian, Yugoslavian, Chechen, Russian conscripts and others. Later known as a de-Nazification camp where many intellectuals, artist, writers were among the POWs. The U-505 crew was kept incommunicado in NE compound. Only known escapee who avoided recapture and returned to Germany via Mexico. Extensive archive collection of photographs, interviews, art, stone castle, and other memorabilia housed in LA Tech archives provided by Camp Ruston Foundation.
Camp San Luis Obispo	California	San Luis Obispo	Held Italian POWs
Camp Salina	Utah	Salina, Utah	This camp had a guard fire on and kill several German prisoners. See Utah prisoner of war massacre
Camp Santa Fe	New Mexico	Santa Fe	
Camp Thomas A. Scott	Indiana	Fort Wayne	Camp Scott held more than 600 German POWs from the Afrika Korps from late 1944 until the camp closed in November 1945.
Camp Scottsbluff	Nebraska		
Camp Shanks	New York	Orangetown	Housed 1,200 Italian and 800 German POWs between April 1945 and January 1946. First Germans arrived in June 1945. 290,000 POWs passed through while being processed to repatriate to their original countries. Last German POW left on 22 July 1946. Camp closed immediately after.
camp in McMillan Woods	Pennsylvania	Gettysburg Battlefield	Same commander as Camp Michaux camp.
Camp Sheboygan	Wisconsin	Winooski	From July to December 1945, 450 German POWs were housed in the Sheboygan County Asylum, which was built in 1878 and abandoned in 1940 when a new facility was completed.
Camp Shelby	Mississippi	Hattiesburg	
Camp Sibert	Alabama	Etowah County	10 members of Hitler's SS troops were held at the camp.
Camp Sidnaw	Michigan	Sidnaw	
Camp Skokie Valley	Illinois	Glenview	
Camp Somerset	Maryland		
Camp Stark	New Hampshire	Coos County	New Hampshire's only POW camp. Sited on the abandoned Civilian Conservation Corps camp about 1.6 miles east of the Stark Covered Bridge in Stark, Coos County.
Camp Stewart	Georgia		
Camp Stockton	California		Camp Storm Lake Iowa
Fort Strong	Massachusetts	Boston	
Stringtown POW Camp	Oklahoma	Atoka	
Camp Sturgeon Bay	Wisconsin	Door County	2,000 German POWs were housed at seven locations on the Door Peninsula, where they worked in the local cherry orchards.
Camp Sturtevant	Wisconsin	Sturtevant	
Camp Sutton	North Carolina		
Camp Swift	Texas	Bastrop	
Camp Thomasville	Georgia	Thomasville	Large German POW camp 2 miles outside of Thomasville. Following World War II, the facilities were taken over by the Veterans Administration with both a hospital and large domiciliary complement. Facilities now serve as an adjunct to the state's mental health program.
Camp Tracy	California	Contra Costa County, California	between Mountain House, California and Byron, California
Camp Thornton	Illinois	Thornton	
Camp Tipton	Oklahoma		
Camp Tishomingo	Oklahoma		
Camp Tonkawa	Oklahoma		Housed 3,000 mostly Germans, taken in North Africa. Site of murder of Johannes Kunze by five fellow German POWs, who were subsequently tried, found guilty, hanged, and interred in the Fort Leavenworth Military Prison Cemetery.
Camp Tooele	Utah		POW Camp, Co. 1, Tooele (original postage)
Camp Trinidad	Colorado	Las Animas County	A 150 feet (46 m) electrically lighted escape tunnel was discovered by authorities. This was probably a coal mining tunnel as Engleville was a coal mining camp where this POW camp is purported to be located. Coal mining was prominent in the late 1870s to the 1950s. A few continued into the early 1970s in Las Animas County where Trinidad is located.
Camp Tyson POW Camp	Tennessee	Paris	
Camp Upton	New York	Suffolk County	Approximately 1,000 Japanese Americans were kept there, under tight security, behind multiple layers of barbed wire fence. Camp Upton was also used to hold Japanese citizens who were in New York City at the time war broke out, including businessman with whom the governments of Japan and the United States negotiated an exchange.
Camp Van Dorn	Mississippi	Wilkinson County	Originally WWII Army infantry training camp.
Camp Wallace	Texas	Galveston County	
Camp Warner	Oregon		
Camp Washington	Illinois	Washington	Reinhold Pabel escaped on 9 September 1945 and was recaptured in Chicago in March 1953
Camp Waterloo	Michigan		Heinz Eschweiler, a 27-year-old German POW, escaped and gave himself up 3 miles north of camp. Capt. Bruce Beiber, commandant at Waterloo, said the prisoner surrendered to Ernest Riemenschneider, who turned him over to state police. The camp housed German POWs in 1944 and 1945.
Camp Waterloo	Wisconsin	Waterloo	
Camp Waupun	Wisconsin	Waupun	
Camp Waynoka	Oklahoma		
Camp Weeping Water	Nebraska		
Camp Wells	Minnesota		
Camp Weingarten	Missouri		Located between Farmington and Ste. Genevieve, Missouri
Camp Wharton	Texas	Wharton	
Camp Wheeler	Georgia		
Camp White	Oregon		
Camp White Rock	Texas	Dallas	A former CCC camp, it was used for POWs who were with Afrika Korps. After the war it became a men's dormitory for Southern Methodist University for the influx of students after the war and now is a Dallas park called Winfrey Point by White Rock Lake.
Camp Whitewater	Minnesota	St. Charles, Minnesota	
Camp Wisconsin Rapids	Wisconsin	Wisconsin Rapids	200 German POWs were interned at the Tri-City Airport (now known as South Wood County Airport) from July to November 1945.
Camp Wolters	Texas		
Corpus Christi Naval Air Station	Texas	Corpus Christi	
Cushing General Hospital	Massachusetts		
Drew Field	Florida		Now Tampa International Airport and Drew Park.
Edgewood Arsenal	Maryland		
Eglin Army Air Field	Florida		
Farragut Naval Training Station	Idaho	Located on Lake Pend Oreille in Bayview for the duration of World War II	The installation housed around 900 Germans, who worked as gardeners and maintenance men around the base and surrounding community. Additionally, Bayview is an unincorporated community; therefore, Farragut Naval Training Station was officially located in Kootenai County.
Fort Andrews	Massachusetts		For Italian prisoners
Fort Benjamin Harrison	Indiana		
Fort Benning	Georgia		
Fort Bliss	Texas		
Fort Bragg	North Carolina		
Fort Campbell	Kentucky		
Fort Crockett	Texas	Galveston	
Fort Curtis	Virginia		
Fort Custer	Michigan		In Section B of Fort Custer National Cemetery, there are 26 German graves. Sixteen of the men were killed or died as a result of an accident on 31 October 1945.
Fort Devens	Massachusetts	Devens	One of first camps (3) designated for de-Nazification: Camp Campbell and Camp McCain, Mississippi.
Fort Dix	New Jersey		Harry Girth escaped in June 1946 and surrendered to authorities in New York City in 1953.
Fort DuPont	Delaware		
Fort Eustis	Virginia		
Fort Getty	Rhode Island		
Fort Gordon	Georgia		
Fort Greble	Rhode Island		
Fort Jackson	South Carolina	Columbia 34°02'53"N 80°57'10"W	All buildings but one have been demolished. The location of the former POW camp is now a residential tract.
Fort Kearny	Rhode Island		Had a de-Nazification program per German based newspaper, Der Ruf (The Call)
Fort Knox	Kentucky		
Fort Lawton	Washington		A riot by Negro soldiers concerned preferential treatment of Italian and German POWs. One Italian POW was lynched, and Leon Jaworski was the military prosecutor. The Italian, and one German POW who committed suicide rather than be repatriated, are interred just outside the post cemetery boundaries.
Fort Leavenworth	Kansas		
Fort Leonard Wood	Missouri		
Fort Lewis	Washington		Located between Olympia and Tacoma, Washington. www.fortlewispowcamp.com
Fort McClellan	Alabama	Calhoun County	
Fort Meade	Maryland		Fort Meade housed about 4,000 German, Italian and two Japanese World War II POWS. Thirty-three German POWs and two Italian POWs are now interred in the post cemetery. German submariner Werner Henke is the most notable, he shot at Fort Hunt, Virginia attempting to escape from a secret interrogation.
Fort Missoula	Montana	Missoula	1941-1944: Italian POWs.
Fort Niagara	New York	Niagara County	Fort Niagara and Pine Camp (now Fort Drum) maintained several sub or branch camps, including one Geneseo.
Fort Oglethorpe	Georgia	Fort Oglethorpe	
Fort Omaha	Nebraska	Omaha	
Fort Ord	California		A 120 feet (37 m) nearly completed escape tunnel was discovered by authorities.
Fort Patrick Henry	Virginia		
Fort Reno	Oklahoma	Fort Reno	Fort Reno
Fort Riley	Kansas		
Fort Robinson	Nebraska		
Fort Rucker	Alabama	Dale County	
Fort D.A. Russell	Texas	Marfa	Building 98
Fort Sam Houston	Texas	San Antonio	
Fort Saulsbury	Delaware		
Fort Sheridan	Illinois	Lake County	Sub camps: Camp Pine, Camp Thornton and Camp Skokie Valley, each with 200 POWs.
Fort Sill	Oklahoma	Lawton	
Fort Sumner	New Mexico		
Fort F.E. Warren	Wyoming		
Glennan General Hospital	Oklahoma	Okmulgee	Now the site of Oklahoma State University Institute of Technology
Goldsboro, Seymour Johnson Air Force Base	North Carolina	Goldsboro	
Grider Field	Arkansas	Pine Bluff	
Halloran General Hospital	New York		
Hammond Northshore Regional Airport	Louisiana		
Hampton Roads Port of Embarkation	Virginia		
Hillcrest Farm	Mississippi	Carriere	
Honouliuli Internment Camp	Hawaii		also housed POWs from the Pacific
Indiantown Gap Military Reservation	Pennsylvania	Indiantown Gap	
Holabird Signal Depot	Maryland		
Jefferson Barracks	Missouri	St. Louis	
Jersey City Quartermaster Supply Depot	New Jersey	Caven Point, Jersey City	
Lovell General Hospital	Massachusetts		
McCloskey General Hospital	Texas	Temple	
Memphis General Depot	Tennessee		
Naval Air Station Whiting Field	Florida	Milton	
New Orleans Port of Embarkation	Louisiana		
Newton D. Baker Hospital	West Virginia	Martinsburg	
Olmstead Field	Pennsylvania		
Patterson Field	Ohio		
Pine Camp	New York	Jefferson County	Present Day Fort Drum
P. O. Box 1142	Virginia	Fort Hunt Park, Fairfax County	
Port Johnson	New Jersey		
Pine Bluff Arsenal	Arkansas	Pine Bluff	
Richmond ASF Depot	Virginia		
Rocky Mountain Arsenal	Colorado	Rose Hill	
Thibodaux, Louisiana	Louisiana	Thibodaux	Housed German POWs from the Afrika Korps after defeat in North Africa. Camp was located in North Thibodaux along Coulon Road.
Tobyhanna Military Reservation	Pennsylvania	Tobyhanna	
Madigan General Hospital	Washington DC		5 Japanese POWs, including 3 officers
Valley Forge General Hospital	Pennsylvania	Valley Forge	
Waltham Memorial Hospital	Massachusetts	Waltham	
Westover Field	Massachusetts	Westover	
Windfall Indiana World War II POW Camp	Indiana	Windfall	
Rome	New York	Rome	
Utica	New York	Utica	
Boonville	New York	Boonville	https://www.westbatonrougemuseum.com/573/Port-Allen-Prisoner-of-War-Sub-Camp-No-7
Camp Gordon Johnston	Florida	Carrabelle	Most of the POWs sent to Florida were assigned to two large camps: Camp Gordon Johnston and Camp Blanding. Twenty-five smaller camps were scattered throughout the state.
Camp Leesburg	Florida	Leesburg	
Company 7	Florida	Dade City	
MacDill Air Force Base	Florida	Tampa	
Liberty Point	Florida	Clewiston	Described by an International Red Cross inspector in March 1945 as the “...worst in all America.”
Winter Haven	Florida		

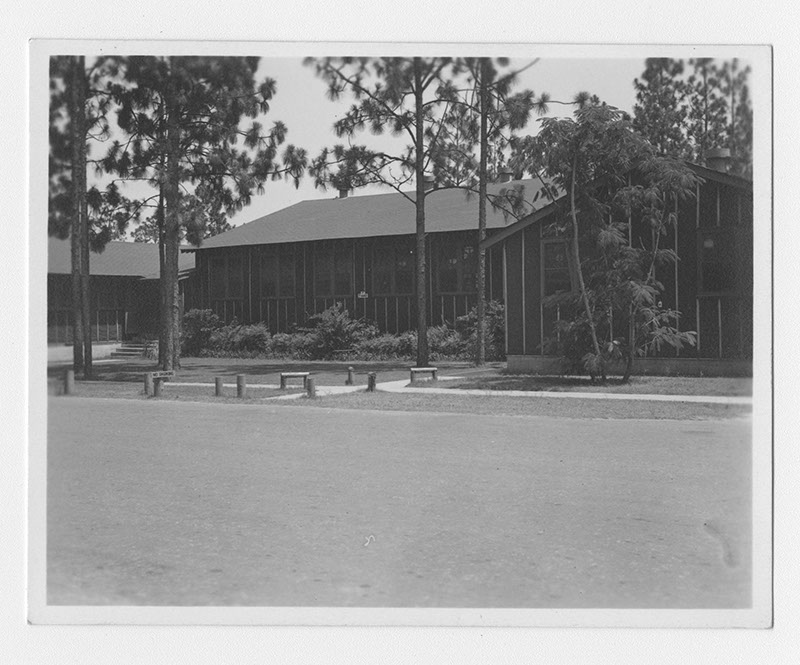
Photograph of headquarters, Bainbridge Army Airfield, Bainbridge, Georgia, June 1944

== See also ==
- German prisoners of war in the United States
