= Midnight Massacre =

Midnight Massacre may refer to:

- Utah prisoner of war massacre, July 1945
- The trade of Tom Seaver to the Cincinnati Reds during the 1977 New York Mets season
- "Midnight Massacre" a crossover comic book storyline involving the Midnight Sons, a fictional team of supernatural superheroes in the Marvel Comics universe
