= Camp Thomas (disambiguation) =

Camp Thomas was a United States Regular Army training facility in Ohio during the American Civil War.

Camp Thomas may also refer to:

- Camp Thomas (Rhode Island), a former United States Navy camp, part of Davisville Naval Construction Battalion Center
- Camp George H. Thomas, name of the Chickamauga and Chattanooga National Military Park, Georgia, during the Spanish–American War
- Fort Thomas, Arizona, formerly Camp Thomas

== See also ==
- Camp Thomas A. Scott, Fort Wayne, Indiana
