= Prisoners of war in Utah during World War II =

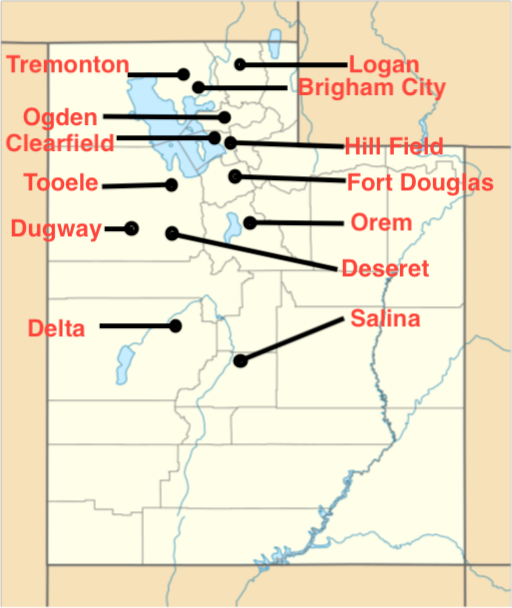
Map of prisoner of war camps in Utah during WWII

During World War II, Utah held 15,000 prisoners of war. These prisoners were predominately German and Italian, and they were spread out over 12 different camps over the course of two years. Utah's terrain of mountains and desert, as well as its isolated and inland position, made it an ideal place for housing POWs. Camps in Salina, Tooele, and Ogden held the most soldiers. Camp Salina is especially notable for the massacre that occurred July 8, 1945. Prisoners provided much of the agricultural labor throughout Utah during the war, allowing them to form special bonds with the community that weren't traditionally seen elsewhere in the country.

== List of Camps ==
=== Military installations ===
==== Bushnell Hospital (Brigham City) ====
Bushnell Hospital was a military hospital built outside of Brigham City that was built in 1942. German and Italian POWs provided labor at the hospital throughout World War II, working on the hospital grounds, in the kitchens, in the laundry, and in nearby orchards. POWs also were able to receive regular medical care at the hospital, even receiving eye care and eyeglasses. A small number of Japanese POWs were given medical treatment there, but were under much more strict guard than the Germans and Italians. After the war, the hospital was converted into the Intermountain Indian School.

==== The Ogden Defense Depot (Ogden) ====
The Ogden Defense Depot was used as a POW camp from 1942 to 1946, one of the first ten POW camps in America upon opening. The camp held one of the largest numbers of prisoners over the course of the war, housing 5,000 Italians and 4,000 Germans. As with many other camps, the prisoners provided much of the local labor, working in warehouses, on farms, and at local orchards.

==== Clearfield Naval Supply Depot (Clearfield) ====
In 1945, 500 German POWs were brought in to supplement the work crews at the Depot. Nearby huts were converted into housing for the prisoners. Prisoners were involved with loading, unpacking, and reloading naval equipment. At the same time, 20 Native Americans from New Mexico were brought in to supply labor as well, overlapping in time with the POWs.

==== Camp Hill Field (south of Ogden) ====
Camp Hill Field served as a base camp and was also known as the Ogden Air Technical Service Counsel. 945 Italian POWs were held there.

==== Fort Douglas (Salt Lake City) ====
Fort Douglas served as a POW camp during both WWI and WWII, opening to hold Germans and Italians in 1944. The camp held a total of 3,227 POWs. Uncooperative prisoners who were a source of trouble at other camps were sent to Fort Douglas. The location now stands as a military museum, and the Fort Douglas Cemetery holds POWs who died while imprisoned: 21 German soldiers, 12 Italian soldiers, and 1 Japanese soldier, amongst the Americans buried there.

==== Camp Warner/Camp Tooele (Tooele) ====
Later known as the Tooele Ordnance Depot, this camp had a capacity for up to 1000 prisoners. During the night of June 5th or the early morning of June 6th,1944 (just before D-Day) two German POWs escaped from the camp by digging under the fence.

==== Dugway Proving Grounds (Dugway) ====
Dugway was the site of biological and chemical testing throughout WWII. In addition to this, the location held 150 POW starting in 1945.

==== Deseret Chemical Weapons Depot ====
This was the smallest POW base camp in Utah.

=== Agricultural camps ===
POWs were sent to these satellite camps for local farm work.

==== Camp Logan (Logan) ====
This branch camp opened in 1945 when 400 Germans were transferred there from nearby camps. The camp itself consisted of 80 tents, two guard towers, a mess hall, and bathrooms. They worked alongside Mexican migrant workers and local community members in beet fields in the valley.

==== Camp Tremonton (Tremonton) ====
Much like at Logan, POWs at Camp Tremonton labored in the sugar beet fields. 20 to 24 POWs left the camp each day to work on local farms.

==== Camp Orem (Orem) ====
Camp Orem originally held 200 interned Japanese-Americans, who were later replaced by 60 Italian POWs from Fort Douglas in 1944, who were subsequently replaced in 1945 by 350 Germans. By the end of the war, the camp consisted of 3 large barracks, a mess hall, bathrooms, and 42 additional tent cabins to house prisoners. They worked in local orchards. The prisoners at Camp Orem had been captured in Northern Africa, and they were regarded as "friendly" and many of them were very well educated, with college professors and a physician among the ranks.

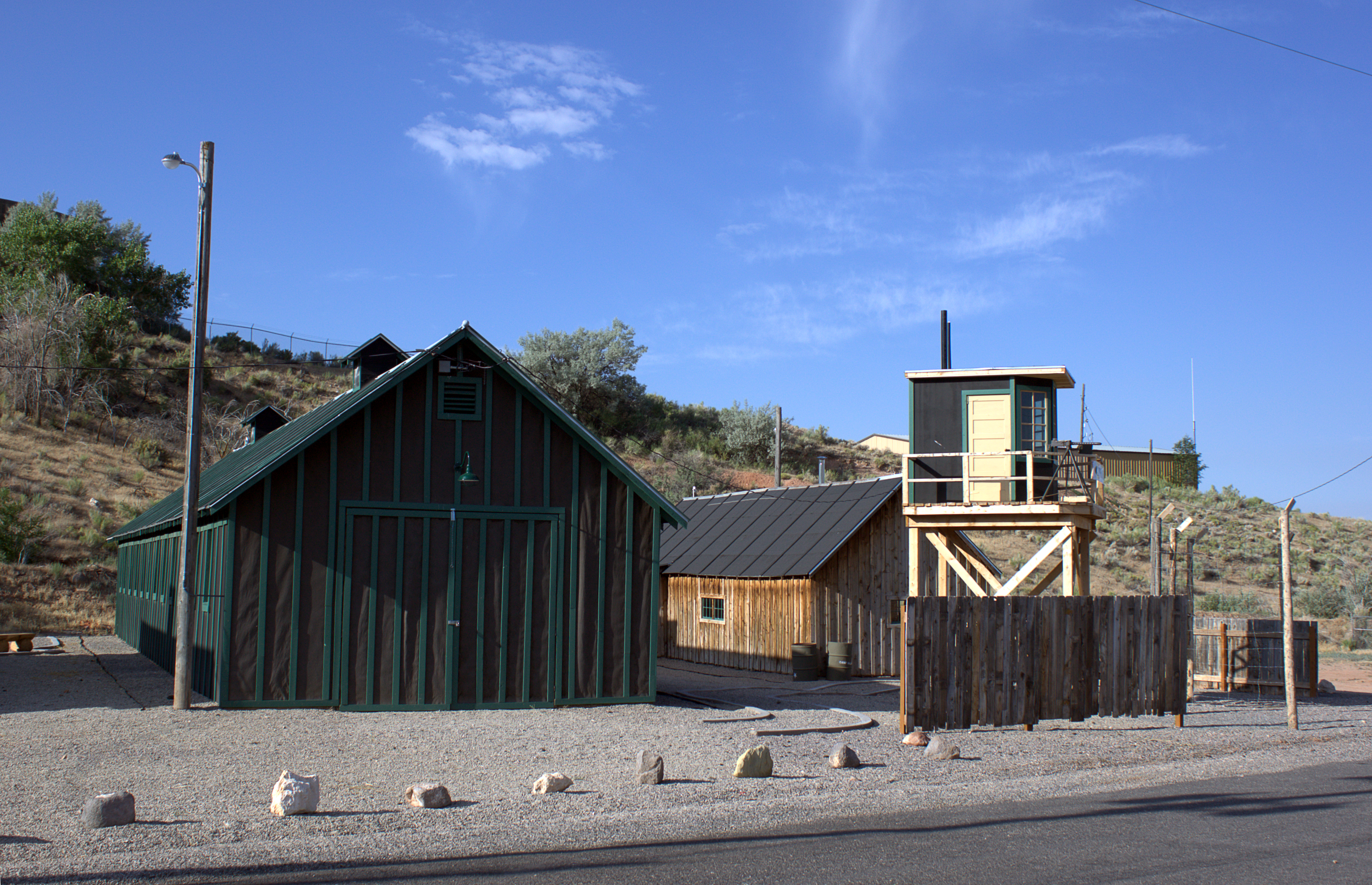
Camp Salina

==== Camp Salina (Salina) ====
Camp Salina held 250 Germans who had been captured in Northern Africa, and they also worked on farms in their local area. On July 8, 1945, an American guard opened fire from a machine gun in the guard tower, ultimately killing 9 Germans and wounding 20 more, and the prisoners who died were buried at the Fort Douglas Cemetery. A newspaper article from the Salt Lake Tribune published the week of the massacre notes that the attack awoke much of the town of Salina. The site is now commemorated by a museum.

== Conditions ==
=== Geneva Conventions ===
The 1929 Geneva Conventions in French – the language it was originally written in.

Prior to the Geneva Conventions, there were no guidelines or protections for internment or prisoners of war. A Red Cross convention in Geneva, Switzerland passed a series of international treaties. The 1929 treaty addressed treatment of prisoners of war and provided guidelines for humane treatment. Countries were to use the same standards for quality of facilities and food for prisoners of war as they used for their own soldiers. Throughout World War II, the United States as a whole was known for treating prisoners of war incredibly well, often in hopes of securing similar treatment for American prisoners held by other countries.

=== Facilities and Food ===
Conditions at the camps were generally regarded to be good. At Camp Tooele, prisoners had canvas cots and each barrack was heated by an oil stove, with each barrack housing 50 men. For much of the war, the camps in Utah maintained the standards of the Geneva Conventions regarding food. However, a decrease in rations following the defeat of Germany led to objections by prisoners that the US was not obeying the Geneva conventions.

=== Labor ===
In Utah, prisoners of war made up a large portion of the wartime labor force. Local farmers were allowed to negotiate labor contracts with prisoners. A portion of their wages ($0.80 per day) went to the prisoners to keep and spend as they wished, and the remaining wages went to the US government to cover food and housing costs for the prisoners. Prisoners worked in fields and orchards throughout Utah, allowing them to interact with farmers and their families.

=== Education ===
As with other camps throughout the US, education programs were run at these camps. Prisoners themselves set up and ran the programs under the supervision of camp authority. Prisoners who ran the programs could subscribe to and request newspapers and periodicals, which would then be filtered through camp officers to censor out propaganda. At Camp Douglas, they began a program to stock the camp with the "right kind" of magazine and periodicals, referring to those with American content. English language and American History classes were the most popular. However, at Camp Hill Field, Italian prisoners who ran the programs expressed hatred for American propaganda. One of the biggest problems facing these education programs was the lack of books available in the prisoners' native languages, but many of the prisoners did speak English.

=== Entertainment and recreation ===
The camps held organized sporting and recreational activities. Camp Ogden had a 30 piece orchestra which would play weekly concerts around the area. Those in military installation camps generally had more activities available to them than those at agricultural camps.

== Attitudes and Morale ==
=== Prisoners ===
Morale was generally high, and prisoners received good treatment. At Bushnell General Hospital in Brigham City, it was noted that security was "often only one guard with a shotgun," yet there were no problems with prisoners escaping. Following the surrender of Italy in 1943, Italian prisoners were given privileges such as weekend leave if they signed the "Italian Service Unit parole agreement." Because of this, many Italian prisoners were actually able to travel to nearby towns and even date American girls. German prisoners did not intermingle with the civilian populations as much. One camp with morale issues was Fort Douglas. It is thought that this is largely because Fort Douglas was where prisoners with "subversive tendencies" were sent.

=== Community Response ===
Members of the communities near and around the camps were generally curious about the prisoners. At first, communities tended to be frightened, if not just curious, about the prisoners, but as the war went on and they grew grateful for the labor that they provided, relationships began to form. Although it was not officially allowed by the military, many community members grew close to some of the prisoners and friendships (and even some romances) formed between the two groups. German community members in Utah who were members of the Church of Jesus Christ of Latter-Day Saints made arrangements for missionary work to be done among the prisoners on behalf of the LDS church.

During the war, Utah had particularly harsh relations with Japanese Americans, with Japanese Americans interned at camps throughout Utah, such as Camp Delta, and Japanese and Japanese Americans experienced persecution in Utah throughout the war. There were organized efforts to prevent Japanese Americans from buying land in Utah. In addition, Native Americans participated in war labor alongside POWs. The population of African Americans in Utah grew during WWII, but, just as in many other parts of the country at the time, they experienced significant discrimination in Utah. Ironically, Utah communities generally embraced many POWs but failed to do the same for the aforementioned groups. In Utah and throughout the United States as a whole, this resulted in German POWs and African Americans, in particular, forming close bonds, as both groups worked together in low-paying farm labor throughout that time period.

== After the War ==
Following the war, many former POWs returned to America to establish their lives there, largely because of the favorable view of America their treatment in POW camps gave them. About 3,000 Germans returned to Utah due to their ties to the LDS church.
