= Camp Algona =

American World War II prisoner of war camp

Coordinates: 43.0812°N 94.2701°W

Camp Algona was an American prisoner of war (POW) camp located in Algona, Iowa. It was operational from 1943 until 1946 and served as a detention facility for German soldiers captured during the conflict. The camp is a significant part of Algona's history and is remembered today through a museum that preserves its legacy.

== History ==
Established in 1944, Camp Algona was part of the United States' effort to manage the large number of Axis POWs captured during World War II. The camp was one of over 400 such facilities across the country, designed to house enemy combatants in accordance with the Geneva Conventions, which stipulated fair treatment for POWs.

== Facilities and daily life ==
Spanning several acres, Camp Algona included barracks, administrative buildings, and security installations typical of POW camps of the era. The camp was designed to house up to 3,000 POWs, although the population varied over time as prisoners were moved between facilities. Daily life for the prisoners included routine roll calls, meals, and recreational activities, with efforts made to adhere to international standards for POW treatment.

== Work programs ==
Reflecting a pragmatic approach to wartime labor shortages, POWs at Camp Algona were engaged in agricultural and other forms of work within the local community. This not only contributed to the U.S. war effort by supplementing the depleted workforce but also helped maintain the morale of the POWs by keeping them occupied. The value of the work done at Camp Algona and its branch camps is over 3 million dollars.

== Closure and legacy ==
With the conclusion of World War II, Camp Algona was decommissioned in 1946, and its prisoners were repatriated to their home countries. The site's history was preserved through the establishment of the Camp Algona POW Museum, which offers exhibits on the camp's history, the daily lives of the POWs, and the broader story of POW camps in the United States during the war.

German prisoners of war at Camp Algona created a Nativity scene in 1945. After the war, they donated it to the town. The display contains 65 figures and is under the care of Algona First United Methodist Church.

== Silent Night In Algona ==
On December 9, 2022, the film Silent Night In Algona by Collective Development, Inc. of Lansing, Michigan, was released which depicted POW life in the Algona POW system from mid-November to Christmas in 1944. The film was written by DJ Perry, was directed by Anthony Hornus, and starred Curran Jacobs, Cassie Dean, and Samuel Peterson.

== See also ==
- List of World War II prisoner-of-war camps in the United States
