= Newmark Ground Water Contamination =

Coordinates: 34.1193°N 117.2897°W

The Newmark Groundwater Contamination Site is a Superfund site located at the base of the San Bernardino Mountains in Southern California. The contamination was discovered in 1980 and resulted in the closing of 20 water supply wells and intensive cleanup efforts in the following years. More than 25 percent of the San Bernardino municipal water supply has been affected by the water contamination since its discovery. The source of the contamination is attributed to a World War II Army landfill and depot, used from 1942 to 1947.

== History ==
The Superfund site was the location of the U.S. Army's Camp Ono from 1942 to 1947, used for housing Italian Prisoners of War and was later converted to a truck and munitions cleaning site. Several of the solvents used in the cleaning process were later discovered to be toxic.

The Newmark Groundwater Contamination Site resides on part of a groundwater aquifer that supplies water to the cities of San Bernardino, Colton, Loma Linda, Fontana, Rialto, and Riverside. Many of the wells responsible for supplying water to these areas lay down gradient from the two contamination plumes that resulted from the pollution.

In 1980, two volatile organic compounds (VOCs), trichloroethylene (TCE) and tetrachloroethylene (PCE) were discovered at the Newmark well fields. Exposure to PCE and TCE is associated with adverse health effects such as Central Nervous System depression, neurological, lung, kidney, and heart effects, and increased cancer risk. The federal standards for TCE and PCE require that all drinking water must be below 5 parts per billion and levels discovered during the contamination were in the hundreds of parts per billion.

== Clean-up ==
In 1993, the EPA took actions to pump and treat millions of gallons of contaminated water to control the spread of pollution plumes into other parts of the aquifer. The water was treated using conventional carbon adsorption and is projected to take several more decades.

== Legal actions ==
In 1996, the city of San Bernardino sued the federal government for the Army's involvement in the contamination of the groundwater. After an eight-year legal battle, the Army settled for $69 million to be used for continued groundwater treatment and cleanup. The city is required to use these funds to maintain the EPA's groundwater treatment facilities and to expand the city's water treatment plants.
