= Internment of Italian Americans =

Internment during World War II

Italian American internment
- Part of the United States home front during World War II
- Date: 1941–1943
- Location: Florence, Arizona, United States

The federal government of the United States interned Italian nationals during World War II. As was customary after Italy and the US were at war, they were classified as "enemy aliens" and some were detained by the Department of Justice under the Alien and Sedition Act. In practice, however, the US applied detention only to Italian nationals, not to US citizens or long-term US residents. Italian immigrants had been allowed to gain citizenship through the naturalization process during the years before the war, and by 1940 there were millions of US citizens who had been born in Italy.

In 1942 there were 695,000 Italian immigrants in the United States. Some 1,881 were taken into custody and detained under wartime restrictions; these were applied most often by the United States Department of Justice to diplomats, businessmen, and Italian nationals who were students in the US, especially to exclude them from sensitive coastal areas. In addition, merchant seamen trapped in US ports by the outbreak of war were detained. Italian labor leaders lobbied for recognition as loyal (and not enemy aliens) those Italian Americans who had initiated naturalization before the war broke out; they objected to blanket classification of Italian nationals as subversives.

In 2001 the US Attorney General reported to Congress on a review of treatment by the Department of Justice of Italian Americans during World War II. In 2010, the California Legislature passed a resolution apologizing for US mistreatment of Italian residents during the war.

== Terms ==
The term "Italian American" does not have a legal definition. It is generally understood to mean ethnic Italians of American nationality, whether Italian-born immigrants to the United States (naturalized or unnaturalized) or American-born people of Italian descent (natural-born U.S. citizens).

The term "enemy alien" has a legal definition. The relevant federal statutes in Chapter 3 of Title 50 of the United States Code, for example par. 21, which applies only to persons 14 years of age or older who are within the United States and not naturalized. Under this provision, which was first defined and enacted in 1798 (in the Alien Enemies Act, one of the four Alien and Sedition Acts) and amended in 1918 (in the Sedition Act of 1918) to apply to females as well as to males, all "natives, citizens, denizens or subjects" of any foreign nation or government with which the United States is at war "are liable to be apprehended, restrained, secured and removed as alien enemies."

At the outbreak of World War II, for example, all persons born in Italy living in the United States, whether US citizens, lawful full-time or part-time residents, or as members of the diplomatic and business community, were considered by law "enemy aliens." However, applying the standard to all persons including US Citizens became problematic given the huge numbers of Italian immigrants and the even larger numbers of their descendants. Accordingly, the government most often applied the term to Italian-born persons who were not United States citizens, but especially to Italian diplomats, Italian businessmen, and Italian international students studying in the United States; all were classified as "enemy aliens" when Italy declared war on the United States. In some cases, such temporary residents were expelled (such as diplomats) or given a chance to leave the country when war was declared. Some were interned, as were the Italian merchant seamen caught in U.S. ports when their ships were impounded when war broke out in Europe in 1939.

The members of the ethnic Italian community in the United States presented an unusual problem. Defined in terms of national origin, it was the largest ethnic community in the United States, having been supplied by a steady flow of immigrants from Italy between the 1880s and 1930. By 1940, there were in the United States millions of native-born Italians who had become American citizens. There were also a great many Italian "enemy aliens", more than 600,000, according to most sources, who had immigrated during the previous decades and had not become naturalized citizens of the United States.

The laws regarding "enemy aliens" did not make ideological distinctions. The U.S. grouped together many types of persons, including pro-Fascist Italian businessmen living for a short time in the U.S. and trapped there when war broke out, anti-Fascist refugees from Italy who arrived a few years earlier intending to become U.S. citizens but who had not completed the process of naturalization, and those who had emigrated from Italy at the turn of the 20th century and raised entire families of native-born Italian Americans but who had not become naturalized. Under the law they were all classified as enemy aliens.

== Before United States entry into World War II ==
In September 1939, Britain and France declared war against Germany after Adolf Hitler invaded Poland. Aware of the possibility of the war eventually involving the United States, President Franklin D. Roosevelt authorized the Director of the Federal Bureau of Investigation, J. Edgar Hoover, to compile a Custodial Detention Index of those to be arrested in case of national emergency. The Axis powers allied with Germany included Fascist Italy and the Empire of Japan. More than a year before the attack on Pearl Harbor, the Department of Justice began to list possible saboteurs and enemy agents among German, Italian, and Japanese Americans.

In 1940, resident aliens were required to register under the Smith Act.

== Timeline of events ==
The following is a chronology of events regarding the treatment of enemy aliens and the reaction in the Italian American community:

=== 1941 to 1943 ===
- On December 11, 1941, Nazi Germany and Fascist Italy declared war on the United States. The United States reciprocated and entered World War II. Beginning on the very night of the December 7, 1941 Japanese attack on Pearl Harbor yet before the US officially declared war against Italy, the Federal Bureau of Investigation arrested a handful of Italians. By December 10, 1941, nearly all the Italians that FBI Director J. Edgar Hoover planned on arresting—about 147 men—were already in custody. By June 1942, the FBI had arrested a total of 1,521 Italian aliens. About 250 individuals were interned for up to two years in the WRA military camps in Montana, Oklahoma, Tennessee, and Texas, in some cases co-located with interned Japanese Americans. The government targeted Italian journalists, language teachers, and men active in an Italian veterans group.
- In late December 1941, enemy aliens throughout the United States, Puerto Rico, and the Virgin Islands were required to surrender hand cameras, short-wave radio receiving sets, and radio transmitters no later than 11 p.m. on the following Monday, January 5, 1942. They were subject to curfew and movement restrictions. Later, they were forced to move out of certain areas. These restrictions were enforced more in the San Francisco area than in Los Angeles and also were much more enforced on the West Coast than on the East Coast: on the East Coast, there were more Italians, thus making up a much higher percentage of the population (especially in major urban centers).
- In January 1942, all enemy aliens were required to register at local post offices. As enemy aliens, they were required to be fingerprinted, photographed, and carry their photo-bearing "enemy alien registration cards" at all times. Attorney General Francis Biddle assured enemy aliens that they would not be discriminated against if they were loyal. He cited Department of Justice figures: of the 1,100,000 enemy aliens in the United States, 92,000 were Japanese, 315,000 were German, and 695,000 were Italian. In all, 2,972 had been arrested and held, mostly Japanese and Germans. Only 231 Italians had been arrested.
- On January 11, 1942, The New York Times reported that "Representatives of 200,000 Italian American trade unionists appealed to President Roosevelt yesterday to 'remove the intolerable stigma of being branded as enemy aliens' from Italian and German nationals who had formally declared their intentions of becoming American citizens by taking out first papers before America's entry into the war."
- A few weeks later, the same newspaper reported that "Thousands of enemy aliens living in areas adjacent to shipyards, docks, power plants, and defense factories prepared today to find new homes as Attorney General Biddle added sixty-nine more districts in California to the earlier list of West Coast sections barred to Japanese, Italian, and German nationals." These were areas defined as within the Exclusion Zone. Japanese Americans were much more affected by this ruling than were German Americans and Italian Americans. The WRA established a 50 miles (80 km) Exclusion Zone on the West Coast that adversely affected Italian Americans who had been working as longshoremen and fishermen, causing many to lose their livelihoods. Those in California were most severely affected. Perhaps because the Italians were more numerous and politically strong on the East Coast, there was never such an Exclusion Zone delineated. Italian Americans in the East did not suffer the same restrictions.
- On February 1, the Justice Department warned all aliens of enemy nationalities fourteen years of age or older that they had to register within the week if they lived in the states of Washington, Oregon, California, Arizona, Montana, Utah, or Idaho. Failure to do so could result in severe penalties, including internment for the duration of the war.
- Later in February, the Italian American Labor Council, founded by Luigi Antonini, met in New York and voiced "opposition to any blanket law for aliens that does not differentiate between those who are subversive and those who are loyal to America."

By September 23, 1942, the Justice Department claimed "…From the time of the Japanese attack on Pearl Harbor until 1 September, 6,800 enemy aliens were apprehended in the United States and half of them have either been paroled or released." Their report dealt with enemy aliens apprehended under the Alien and Sedition Act, who were primarily German nationals.

- On Columbus Day 1942, Francis Biddle announced the restrictions were lifted against Italian nationals living as long-term residents in the United States stating that, "beginning October 19, a week from today, Italian aliens will no longer be classed as 'alien enemies.'" The plan was approved by President Roosevelt and many restrictions were lifted. Members of the Italian community could now travel freely again, own cameras and firearms, and were not required to carry ID cards. In addition a plan was announced to offer citizenship to 200,000 elderly Italians living in the United States who had been unable to acquire citizenship due to a literacy requirement. Those men in WRA camps were interned for nearly another year, until after Italy's surrender.
- Italy's surrender to the Allies on September 8, 1943, resulted in the release of most of the Italian American internees by year's end. Some had been paroled months after "exoneration" by a second hearing board appealed for by their families. Most of the men had spent nearly two years as prisoners, being moved from camp to camp every three to four months.

== Attorney General's 2001 Report on Wartime Restrictions ==
In response to activists concerned about the treatment of Italian Americans during the war, on November 7, 2000, the U.S. Congress passed the "Wartime Violation of Italian American Civil Liberties Act".(Pub. L. 106–451 (text) (PDF), 114 Stat. 1947) This law, in part, directed the U.S. Attorney General to conduct a comprehensive review of the treatment by the U.S. Government of Italian Americans during World War II and to report on its findings within a year. The Attorney General submitted this report, A Review of the Restrictions on Persons of Italian Ancestry During World War II, to the U.S. Congress on November 7, 2001, and the House Judiciary Committee released the report to the public on November 27, 2001. The report, covering the period September 1, 1939, to December 31, 1945, describes the authority under which the United States undertook enforcement of wartime restrictions on Italian Americans and detailed these restrictions.

In addition, the report provides 11 lists, most of which include the names of those most directly affected by the wartime restrictions.

The lists include:

1. the names of 74 persons of Italian ancestry taken into custody in the initial roundup following the attack on Pearl Harbor and prior to the United States declaration of war against Italy,
2. the names of 1,881 other persons of Italian ancestry who were taken into custody,
3. the names and locations of 418 persons of Italian ancestry who were interned,
4. the names of 47 persons of Italian ancestry ordered to move from designated areas under the Individual Exclusion Program or, and an additional 12 who appeared before the Individual Exclusion Board, though it unknown if an exclusion order was issued,
5. the names of 56 persons of Italian ancestry not subject to individual exclusion orders who were ordered to temporarily move from designated areas,
6. the names of 442 persons of Italian ancestry arrested for curfew, contraband, or other violations,
7. a list of 33 ports from which fishermen of Italian ancestry were restricted,
8. names of 315 fishermen of Italian ancestry who were prevented from fishing in prohibited zones,
9. the names of 2 persons of Italian ancestry whose boats were confiscated,
10. a list of 12 railroad workers of Italian ancestry prevented from working in prohibited zones, of whom only 4 are named, and
11. a list of 6 wartime restrictions on persons of Italian ancestry resulting specifically from Executive Order 9066.

Separately, in 2010, the California Legislature passed by an overwhelming margin a resolution apologizing for US mistreatment of Italian residents in the state during the war, noting restrictions and indignities, as well as loss of jobs and housing.

== See also ==
- American propaganda during World War II
- Arizona during World War II
- Camp Albuquerque – A camp in New Mexico for Italian and German prisoners of war.
- Fascist League of North America
- Internment of German Americans
- Internment of Japanese Americans
- Italian Canadian internment
- List of World War II prisoner-of-war camps in the United States
