= Camp Beaver Dam =

American World War II prisoner of war camp

Coordinates: 43°27′21″N 88°49′41″W

- Beaver Dam, Wisconsin in United States

Site information
- Type: Prisoner of war camp

Location
- Location within Wisconsin

Site history
- In use: June 17, 1944 – August 1944

Garrison information
- Past commanders: Lt. John B. Price; Lt. Lawrence J. Distel
- Occupants: 300 German prisoners of war

Camp Beaver Dam was an American World War II prisoner of war camp in Beaver Dam, Wisconsin during the summer of 1944. The camp held 300 German prisoners of war in a tent city encampment where the Wayland Academy field house now stands.

== See also ==
- List of POW camps in the United States
