= Camp Ashby (Virginia) =

WWII prisoner-of-war camp

Coordinates: 36.844235°N 76.119493°W

Camp Ashby in the Thalia community of Princess Anne County, Virginia was the largest Prisoner of War camp in South Hampton Roads during World War II. It housed 6,000 German troops, many of Adolf Hitler's Afrika Corps who had been captured in North Africa during the closing years of World War II.

Camp Ashby was erected quickly in 1942 on land leased from the state. At the time, the property's dominant feature was the Tidewater Victory Memorial Hospital, a tuberculosis sanitarium at Virginia Beach Boulevard and Thalia Road. That building became the camp's headquarters. The camp's low-slung barracks were scattered across 22 acres (89,000 m^{2}) of woods and field north of the present main branch of the Virginia Beach Central Library and Loehman's Plaza shopping center.

In modern times, the original hospital building is part of the Willis Wayside Furniture complex. Although several barracks buildings were converted and are extant as private residences, little else remains of the original camp.

== See also ==
- List of World War II prisoner-of-war camps in the United States
