= Pomona Assembly Center =

California Historic Landmark

Pomona Assembly Center Camp Pomona Pomona Ordnance Depot
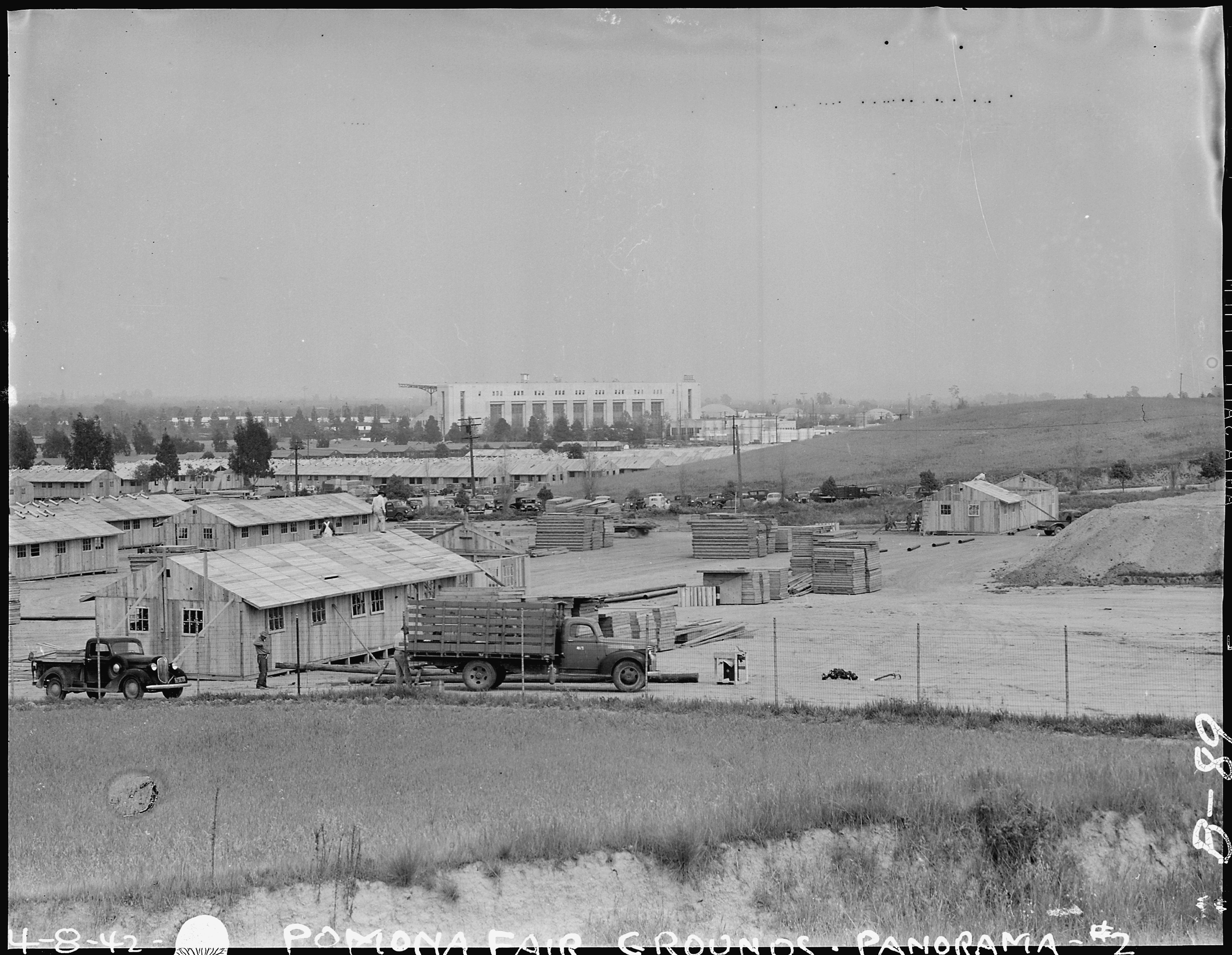
- Construction of the Pomona Assembly Center (April 8, 1942)

- Location within the Los Angeles metropolitan area
- 34°04′53″N 117°45′59″W

History
- Built: 1942

California Historical Landmark
- Designated: May 13, 1980
- Reference no.: 934.04

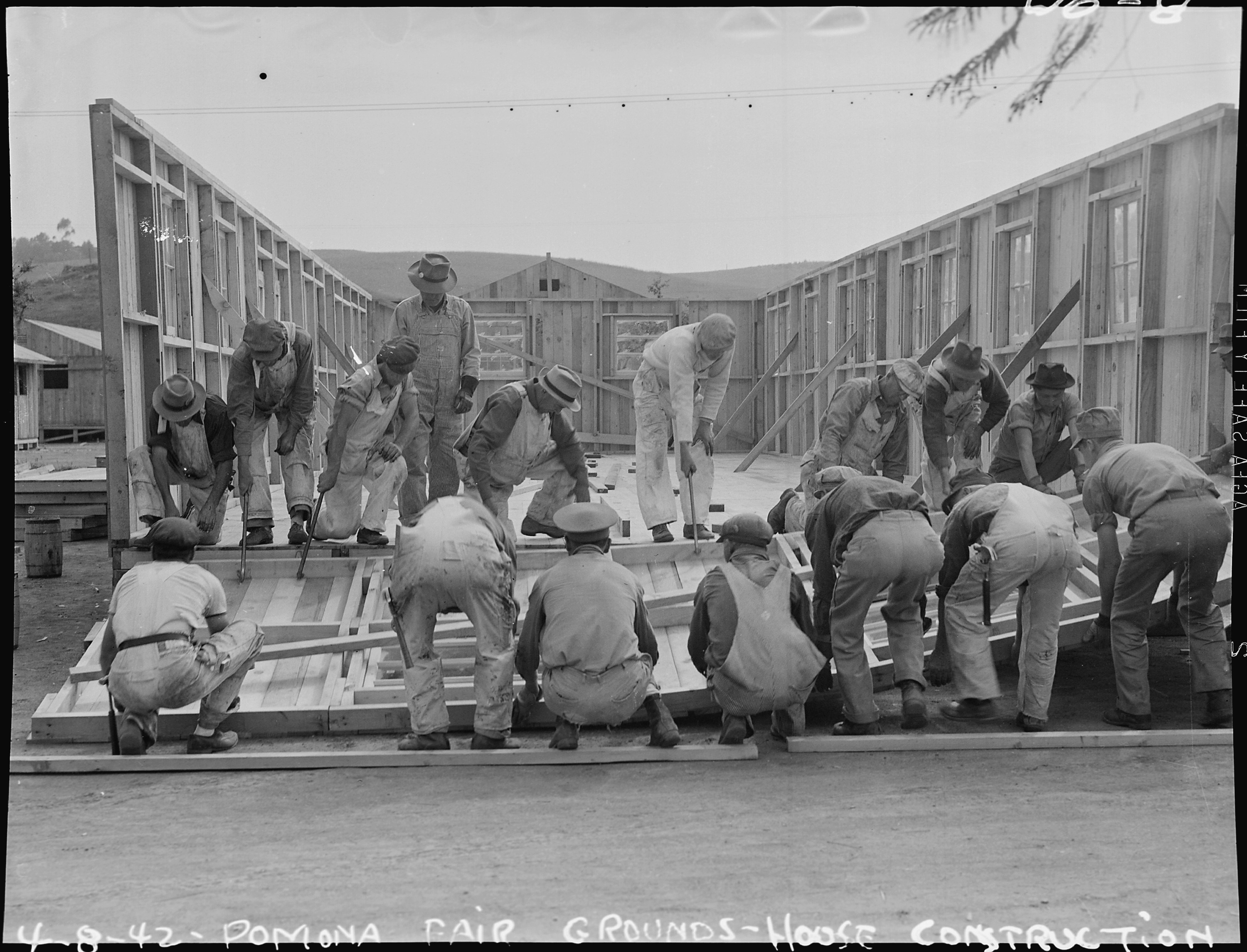
Building housing at the Pomona Assembly Center (April 8, 1942)

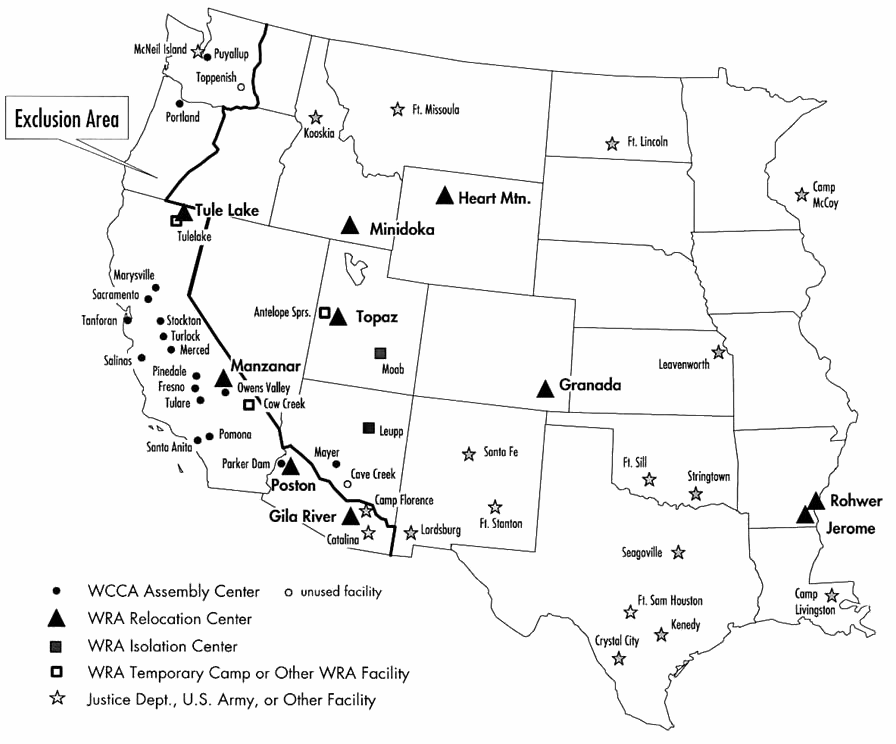
Institutions of the War Relocation Authority in the Midwestern, Southern, and Western United States

The Temporary Detention Camp for Japanese Americans / Pomona Assembly Center is one of the places Japanese Americans were held during World War II. The Pomona Assembly Center was designated a California Historic Landmark (No. 934.04) on May 13, 1980. The Pomona Assembly Center is located in what is now called the Fairplex in Pomona, California in Los Angeles County. The Pomona Assembly Center was called Los Angeles County Fairgrounds in 1942.

== History ==
After the attack on Pearl Harbor on December 7, 1941, it was feared that some Japanese Americans might be loyal to the Empire of Japan and Emperor of Japan. This was in spite of the fact that U.S. intelligence investigations, summarized in the report of Special Representative to the State Department Curtis B. Munson in November 1941, concluded that Japanese Americans posed no threat whatsoever to national security; that "There is no Japanese 'problem' on the Coast." Nevertheless, President Franklin D. Roosevelt on February 19, 1942, signed Executive Order 9066, which authorized the Secretary of War to prescribe certain areas as military zones, clearing the way for the incarceration of Japanese Americans, German Americans, and Italian Americans in U.S. concentration camps. The Los Angeles County Fairgrounds was selected as one of the Southern California detention camps. The other Los Angeles County camp selected was the Santa Anita assembly center at the Santa Anita Racetrack, which is also a California Historic Landmark (No. 934.07). A California Historic Landmark plaque is located near Fairplex, on the grassy drop off area, north of the intersection of Canyon Way and West McKinley Avenue, at around 1099 West McKinley Avenue, Pomona, California.

Construction on the Pomona Assembly Center began on March 21, 1942, and the camp officially opened on May 7, 1942. The Pomona Facility consisted of 309 barracks, 8 mess halls, and 36 shower and latrine facilities. The first group of 72 Japanese American citizens arrived on May 9. By May 15, 1942, the Pomona site was operating near capacity, with 4,270 internees. Pomona reached a peak population of 5,434 before its closing on August 24, 1942. Most internees there were transferred to Heart Mountain in Wyoming. The site remained in use for the duration of the war, first housing U.S. troops, and then German and Italian prisoners of war. Today, the site serves as the Fairplex parking lot.

In California, 13 temporary detention facilities were built. Large venues that could be sealed off were used, such as fairgrounds, horse racing tracks and Works Progress Administration labor camps. These temporary detention facilities held Japanese Americans while permanent concentration camps were built in more isolated areas. In California Camp Manzanar and Camp Tulelake were built. Executive Order 9066 took effect on March 30, 1942. The order required all native-born Americans and long-time legal residents of Japanese ancestry living in California to surrender themselves for detention.

In January 1945 the Supreme Court ruled in ex parte Endo that it was illegal to detain loyal Japanese Americans without cause, and the camps were ordered closed. The last Japanese Americans were released in May 1946. In total 97,785 Californians of Japanese ancestry were held during the war.

== Marker ==
Marker on the site reads:

- NO. 934 TEMPORARY DETENTION CAMPS FOR JAPANESE AMERICANS-SANTA ANITA ASSEMBLY CENTER AND POMONA ASSEMBLY CENTER – The temporary detention camps (also known as 'assembly centers') represent the first phase of the mass incarceration of 97,785 Californians of Japanese ancestry during World War II. Pursuant to Executive Order 9066 signed by President Franklin D. Roosevelt on February 19, 1942, thirteen makeshift detention facilities were constructed at various California racetracks, fairgrounds, and labor camps. These facilities were intended to confine Japanese Americans until more permanent concentration camps, such as those at Manzanar and Tule Lake in California, could be built in isolated areas of the country. Beginning on March 30, 1942, all native-born Americans and long-time legal residents of Japanese ancestry living in California were ordered to surrender themselves for detention.

== Camp Pomona ==
The last internee was moved out on August 24, 1942. On September 4, 1942, the Pomona Assembly Center was changed and turned over to the Army's Ordnance Motor Transport Agency and became known as the Pomona Ordnance Depot, Pomona Ordnance Base and Camp Pomona. The depot stored vast supplies needed for the Desert Training Centers in California and Arizona. Built at the depot also was a prisoner of war camp, the camp held 1,150 POWs, who did volunteer work at the depot. Units at the depot - camp: Ordnance Automotive School, Ordnance Motor Transport School, Ordnance Service Command Shop, Ordnance Unit Training Center, Pomona Ordnance Base, Pomona Ordnance Depot, Pomona Ordnance Depot Prisoner of War Camp, Pomona Ordnance Motor Base, Pomona Quartermaster Motor Base, Quartermaster Motor Transport School, and the Shop Supervisory Training Center, Pomona. At the Ordnance Motor Transport School, 3,000 troops were trained. The Italian Service Units of the 2nd Italian Quartermaster Service Company and 9th Italian Ordnance Medium Automotive Maintenance Company worked at the Pomona Ordnance Depot.

== Camp Ayres ==
Camp Ayres - Chino Supply Depot - Camp Chino was a US Army and California State Guard subcamp of Camp Pomona, located in Chino, California, 33.9986239°N 117.6881105°W. The site was 30 acres of land on Central Avenue at Edison. For World War II the camp housed 500 German POWs starting in October 1944. The camp started in the 1930s for workers on Works Progress Administration projects. In May 1945 fire started at the camp depot, gas bombs, hand grenades, and small arms ammunition exploded. After the war in 1946 that site returned to farm works camp. In 1956 the site became the Chino Fairgrounds. Camp Ayers was named in honor of Sergeant Henry B. Ayers, a California State Guard, that died in the Battle of Los Angeles on February 24, 1942. He was driving a US Army truck with ammunition and had a heart attack at age 60.

== See also ==
- Bibliography of the Japanese American Internment during World War II
- Outline of Japanese American Internment during World War II
- California Historical Landmarks in Los Angeles County
- California during World War II
