= Camp Hearne =

US Prisoner of War camp during World War Two

Coordinates: 30.8863°N 96.6194°W

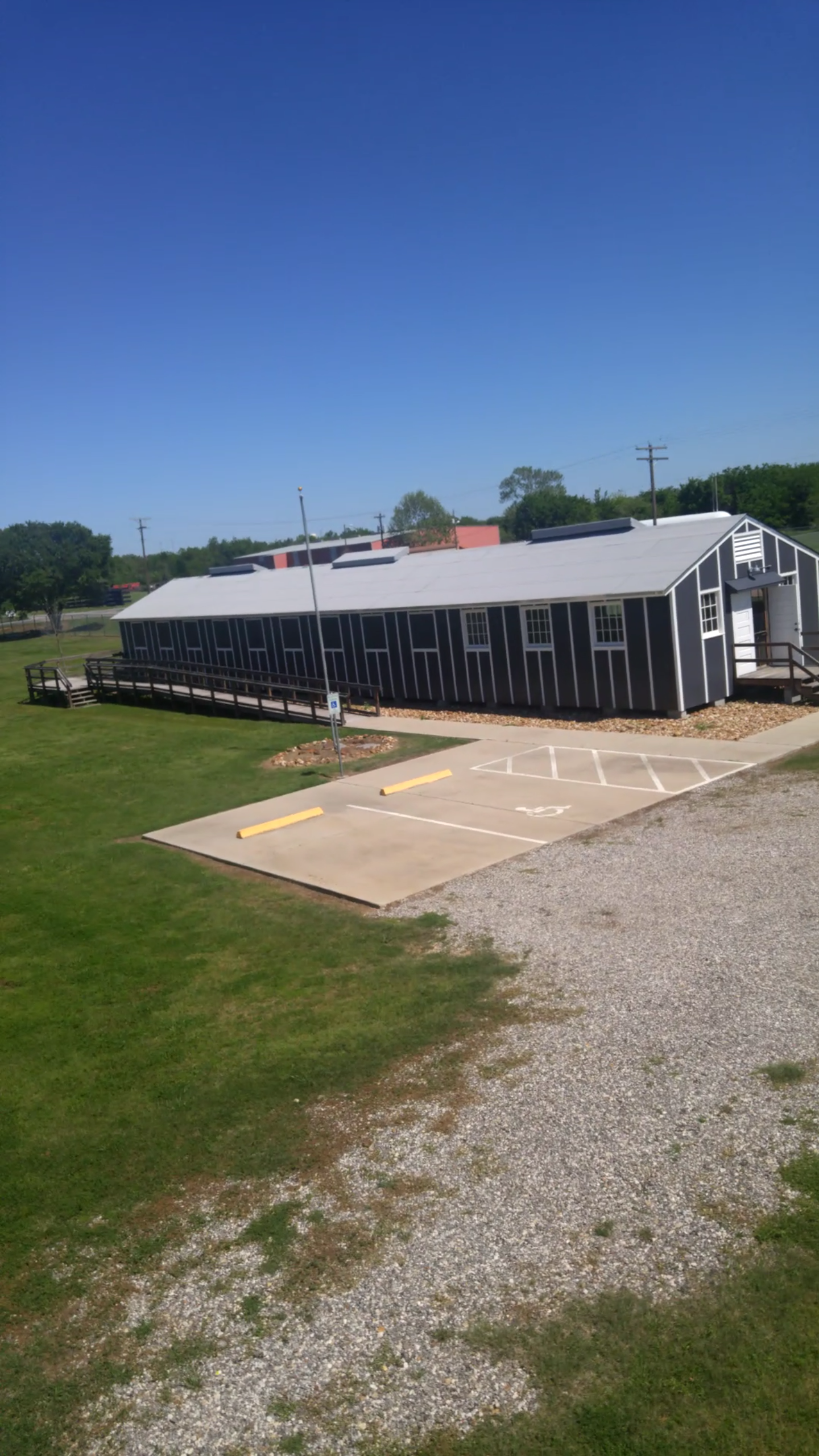
Camp Hearne Museum

Camp Hearne, located in Hearne, Texas, was a prisoner-of-war camp during the Second World War. Commissioned in 1942, Camp Hearne was one of the few camps that housed prisoners from all three Axis powers during the conflict. After its decommissioning and piecemeal sell-off by the United States government, the site remained abandoned for 70 years. Today, a single replica of a barracks stands on the site of the former camp, which contains a museum.

The camp also served as the central prisoner-of-war (POW) postal service, "responsible for the distribution of all mail to POWs in the United States." According to Krammer, in their spare time, the German POWs "painstakingly constructed replicas of old German castles - waist high - down to the detailed turrets and moats, and a curious visitor to the old camp site can still examine a medieval little Schloss rising just above the weed tops in a corner of the empty landscape where the camp used to be." Unfortunately, the period was marred by at least one escape attempt, a suicide, and a murder of a perceived American collaborator. On December 17, 1943, Hugo Krauss was fatally beaten by a mob of six to 10 fellow German POWs. Before Camp Hearne closed in 1946, one of the attackers, Günther Meisel, confessed out of remorse. Meisel and six others were convicted of premeditated murder and sentenced to life in prison. On appeal, the convictions of two of the prisoners were overturned and the sentences of the other five were reduced. Meisel had his sentence reduced to 15 years and the others had their sentences reduced to 10 years. They were all released from prison under the order of President Harry S. Truman in 1949.

Some residents said that the German POWs were treated too well, so called the camp "The Fritz Ritz" in reference to the luxury hotel chain.

German writer Hannes Köhler put Camp Hearne and the events among German POWs at the center of his 2018 novel Ein mögliches Leben (One Possible Life).

== See also ==
- List of World War II prisoner-of-war camps in the United States
- German prisoners of war in the United States
