= Italian Service Units =

Prisoners of war military units

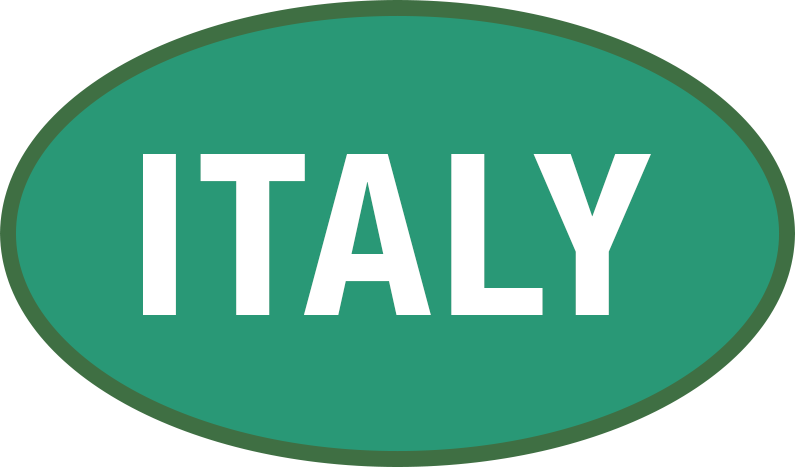
- Location: United States and Europe
- Date: May 1944 – October 1945

The Italian Service Units or ISUs were military units composed of Italian prisoners of war (POWs) that served with the Allies during World War II against Nazi Germany and the Empire of Japan from May 1944 to October 1945. The armed forces of the United States captured many Italian soldiers during the North African campaign Operation Torch, which started in November 1942 and sent 51,000 of them to the United States. After the signing of the armistice by the Badoglio government in Italy on September 8, 1943, and with Pietro Badoglio and the Kingdom of the South officially declaring war on Nazi Germany on October 13, 1943, the Americans began to see the POWs as potential allies. The capture of Rome by the Allies on June 4, 1944, motivated many POWs to change sides. About 90% joined Italian Service Units, which operated in the United States and overseas.

== U.S. Army Service Corps ==
ISUs operated as part of the US Army Service Corps. The men who volunteered were given jobs, monetary compensation and some freedom of movement. The POWs were promised that they would not see combat or be sent abroad. The 45,000 Italian POWs who joined ISUs moved to places with a shortage of manpower. These areas included coastal, industrial and depot sites across the United States. Each ISU had 40 to 250 men, with an Italian officer as their commander. ISUs worked with both military and civilian personnel. The units supported agriculture, hospitals, army depots, seaports and army training centers. ISUs were given Italian uniforms with ISU insignia and badges. The remaining 10% of Italian POWs (about 3,000) who did not volunteer or who were deemed to be Pro-Fascist were held in isolated camps in Texas, Arizona, Wyoming and Hawaii. The largest Fascist POW Camp was called Camp No. 1 in Hereford, Texas. ISU members called it Campo Dux, which was the name of Mussolini's Fascist youth camps in Italy. Some called these camps camicie nere, meaning Blackshirts, in reference to the Fascist paramilitary. Some who did not volunteer were concerned about family members living in German-occupied Northern Italy.

Italian-Americans in the United States began to look into the low-security Italian POW camps to find relatives, family friends or those from their hometowns. Some Roman Catholic churches hosted dinners on Sunday where local Italian-Americans visited with Italian POWs in the camps. Italian POWs could often leave the camp, escorted by a US soldier.

In October 1945, the ISUs were decommissioned and their members returned to Italy. As an acknowledgment of their service, some ISU members became US immigrants. Most arrived home in Italy in January 1946. By the end of the war, the ISUs had contributed millions of hours to the Allied war effort. Some formed bonds and relationships with locals. POW-American couples traveled to Italy to be married before returning to America, due to quotas restricting immigration into the US after the war.

Examples of ISUs in America:

- Birmingham General Hospital, California about 40 Italian POWs from the North African campaign volunteered at the Hospital.
- Letterman Army Hospital
- Torney General Hospital
- Santa Anita Ordnance Training Center
- Camp Anza, the 8th Italian Quartermaster Service Company.
- Benicia Arsenal making ammo, 4th, 4th and 50th Italian Quartermaster Service Company.
- Camp Cooke, the 140th and 142nd Italian Quartermaster Service Company
- Camp Haan, the 3rd Italian Quartermaster Service Company
- Mira Loma Quartermaster Depot, 150th, 151st, 152nd, 153rd, and 314th Italian Quartermaster Service Company.
- Fort Ord 132nd and 133rd Italian Quartermaster Service Company
- Pomona Ordnance Depot 2nd Italian Quartermaster Service Company and 9th Italian Ordnance Medium Automotive Maintenance Company
- Camp Roberts 10th Italian Quartermaster Service Company
- Camp Ross 11th, 26th, 27th, 127th, 128th, and 302nd Italian Quartermaster Service Company
- San Bernardino Engineer Depot, 101st, 106th, and 318th Italian Engineer Base Depot Company
- Presidio of San Francisco 138th and 141st Italian Quartermaster Service Company
- Camp San Luis Obispo 15th Italian Ordnance Medium Maintenance Company and 27th Italian Ordnance Heavy Maintenance Company
- Sierra Army Depot 119th and 68th Italian Quartermaster Service Company
- Camp Stoneman 18th Italian Quartermaster Service Company
- Yermo Holding and Re-consignment Point, 129th, 130th, and 131st Italian Quartermaster Service Company
- Yuma Test Branch at Camp Laguna to help build and test combat bridges from 1944 to 1945.

== Overseas ==
Over 10,350 ISU men worked in the US Army Quartermaster Corps (CONAD) in France by the end of 1944. ISUs worked with the US 5th Army. They were sent to help in areas that faced a shortage of manpower. Also, they were deployed to Tunisia and Algeria. Some 28,000 ISU men were used to support the invasion of Southern France, called Operation Dragoon.

=== Italian Army Service Units ===
Italians who were not POWs, but volunteered to help American and British forces were put into Italian Army Service Units. These were put into U.S.-ITI units or British-ITI units. Italian Army Service Units in Italy were disbanded on July 1, 1945.

Many other Italians joined the Italian Co-belligerent Army (Esercito Cobelligerante Italiano), a Combat Army of the allies. Some Italian allies units were called the Army of the South (Esercito del Sud), or Italian Liberation Corps (Corpo Italiano di Liberazione).

== See also ==
- American Theater (1939–1945)
- Desert Training Center
- Italian Military Internees
- Military history of the United States during World War II
- United States home front during World War II
- List of World War II prisoner-of-war camps in the United States
