= Thalia, Virginia =

Thalia
- Unincorporated area
- Location within the Commonwealth of Virginia Thalia (the United States)
- Coordinates: 36°50′37″N 76°7′15″W
- Country: United States
- State: Virginia
- Independent city: Virginia Beach
- Time zone: UTC−5 (Eastern (EST))
  - Summer (DST): UTC−4 (EDT)
- ZIP codes: 23452
- Area code: 757

Thalia is a residential neighborhood in the northeastern area of the independent city of Virginia Beach in the Hampton Roads region of Virginia.

== History ==
Thalia was originally an unincorporated community in Princess Anne County. It was the location of Summerville Plantation, home of wealthy Scottish merchant George F. McIntosh (1768–1863), whose business was based in Norfolk.

During World War II, Camp Ashby, a U.S. Army prisoner-of-war camp, was located at Thalia.

The area underwent extensive residential development after the war. In 1963, by mutual consent, the county was consolidated with the resort city of Virginia Beach, forming one of Virginia's largest cities.

== Modern community ==
The community is home to Virginia Beach EMS Station 15, dedicated as the "James L. Wood Thalia EMS Station" (formerly Thalia Volunteer Fire Department and formerly VBFD Station 7), Thalia Elementary School, and Loehmann's Plaza, a shopping center. Princess Anne High School and Virginia Beach Town Center are just west of the neighborhood on Virginia Beach Boulevard, separated from it by the southern reach of Thalia Creek.

Neighboring waterways are Western Branch Lynnhaven River, Thurston Branch, and Buchannan Creek.

Sub-neighborhoods include Thalia Acres, Lynn Shores, Thalia Manor, Thalia Village, Thalia Wayside, Thalia Station and Thalia Shores. Caren Drive and Birchwood Gardens mark the eastern border of the neighborhood. Other notable streets in the community are Thalia Road, Thalia Drive, Edinburgh Drive, and Lynn Shores Drive.
