= Santa Anita Ordnance Training Center =

US army training center in California

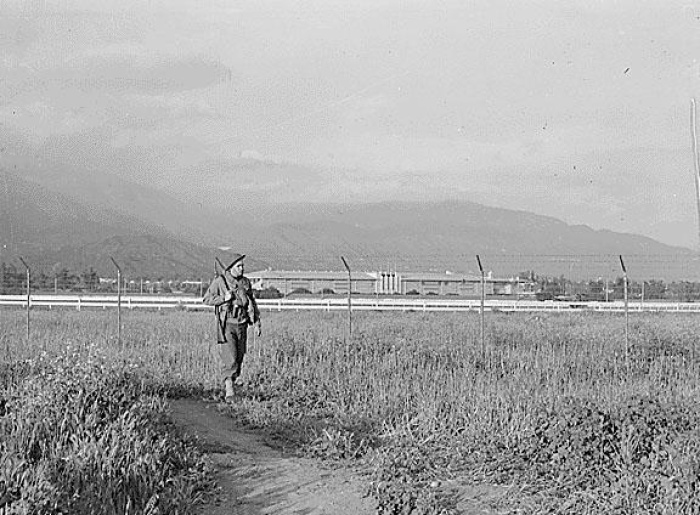
- Santa Anita Ordnance Training Center with Military police

- Location within the Los Angeles metropolitan area
- 34°10′19″N 118°03′04″W
- Location: Santa Anita Racetrack, Arcadia, California and San Gabriel Mountains

History
- Built: Opened November 30, 1942 to November 1944

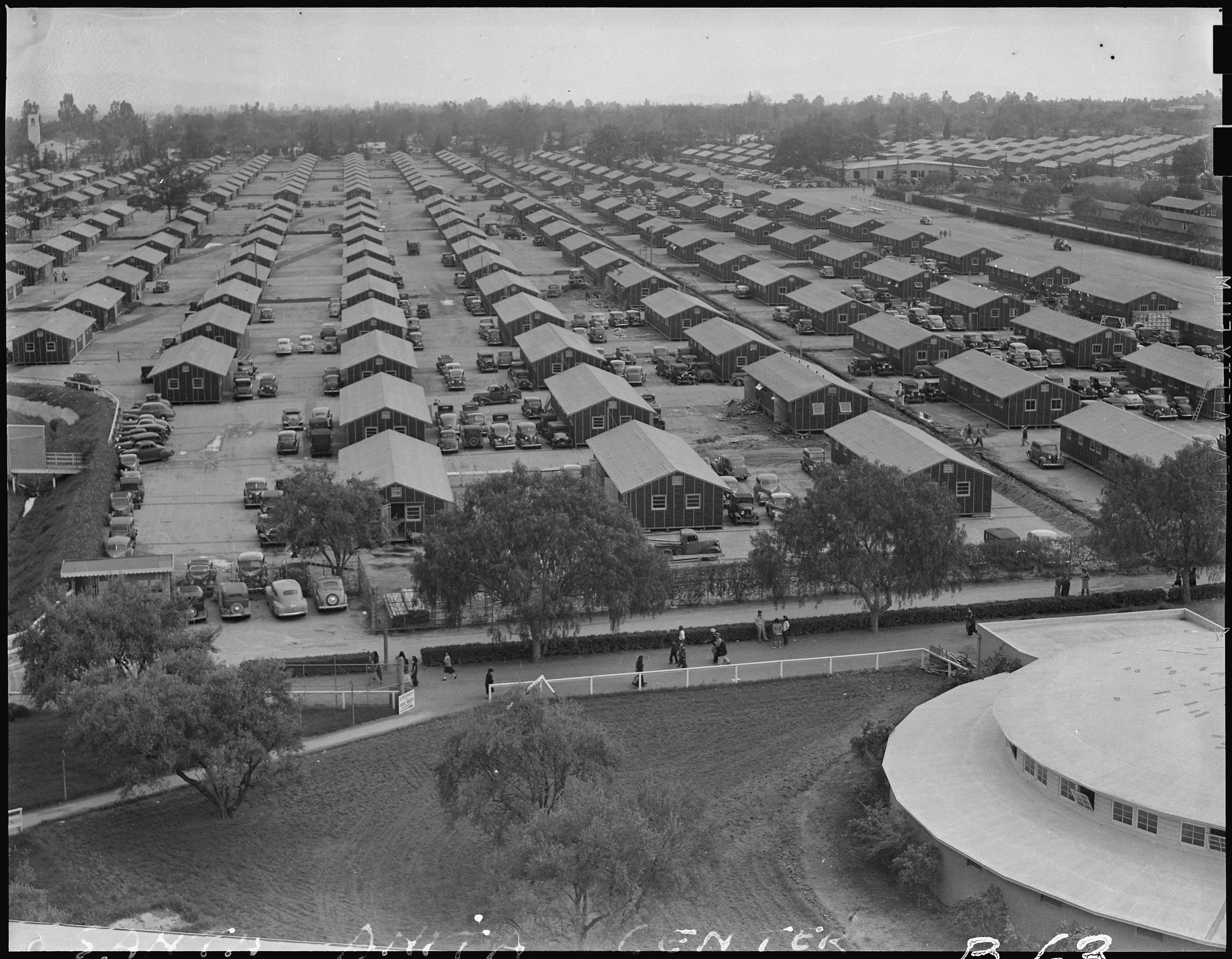
A panoramic view of the Camp Santa Anita

The Santa Anita Ordnance Training Center also called Camp Santa Anita was a training center built for World War II. Santa Anita Ordnance Training Center Rifle Range was built is what is now the foothills of the San Gabriel Mountains in the Angeles National Forest, just north of East Pasadena, California and Sierra Madre, California. The 1029 acres camp, opened on November 30, 1942, was used for rifle and pistol training. Also at the range was small anti-aircraft range and an infiltration course, a type of obstacle course. The range closed in 1944 and the land lease ended in 1950. Most of troops trained at the range were based at the U.S. Army Ordnance Corps's Santa Anita Ordnance Training Center at the Santa Anita Racetrack in Arcadia, California in Los Angeles County. Before used as a training center the Santa Anita Racetrack was used for the Santa Anita assembly center a temporary internment camp for Japanese Americans from March 27 to October 27 of 1942. Camp Santa Anita was also used to hold German prisoner of war, held at the camp was several thousand of Erwin Rommel's Afrika Korps troops captured during the North African campaign. The Center had some Italian Service Units working at the depot.

== See also ==
- California Historical Landmarks in Los Angeles County
