= Camp Opelika =

World War II–era prisoner of war camp in Alabama, US

Camp Opelika was a World War II era prisoner of war (POW) camp in Opelika, Alabama. Its construction began in September 1942 and it shut down in September 1945. The first prisoners, captured by the British, were part of General Erwin Rommel's feared Africa Corps. It held approximately 3,000 German prisoners at any one time.

== Present ==
The Museum of East Alabama in Opelika hosts a collection of material from Camp Opelika. One lone barrack from the camp remains in the present day and is located behind the Four Seasons Credit Union located at 2300 Marvyn Parkway. The Orr Industrial Park now occupies the site just south of I-85 on the south side of Opelika.

A historical marker erected by the Opelika Historic Preservation Society and the Historic Chattachoochee Commission stands at the southwest quadrant of the intersection of Marvyn Parkway and Williamson Avenue. This marker reads:

Located on this 800 acre site was an enemy prisoner of war camp. Construction of Camp Opelika began in September 1942. The first prisoners, captured by the British, were part of General Erwin Rommel's Africa Corps. The camp prisoner population was maintained around 3000 until the end of World War II, in May 1945. In September 1945 the camp was deactivated and deeded to the City of Opelika. For a brief period the camp quarters were used for veteran's housing before the site became an industrial park.

== See also ==
- Georg Gärtner
- List of World War II prisoner-of-war camps in the United States
