= Windfall Indiana World War II POW Camp =

Coordinates: 40.365496°N 85.952902°W

Windfall World War II POW Camp

Windfall Indiana World War II POW Camp was a World War II German prisoner-of-war camp from 1944 to 1945 in Windfall, Indiana, United States. The camp was located near the site of the Windfall High School. The location, on the northeast side of town, is now home to a mobile home community. At its peak the camp housed 1,500 German prisoners and their prison officers. The prisoners were put to work laboring on local farms.
