= Camp Albuquerque =

Coordinates: 35.0437°N 106.6562°W

Camp Albuquerque was an American World War II POW camp in Albuquerque, New Mexico that housed Italian and German prisoners of war. From this branch camp, the POWs did mostly farm labor, from 1943 to 1946. Most of these POWs were transferred from Camp Roswell, which was a base or main POW camp for New Mexico. Camp Lordsburg, New Mexico, and Camp El Paso, Texas, were also base camps.

== History ==
Prisoners were transferred to Camp Albuquerque because it was closer to their work sites. These main and branch camps were part of a POW camp system spread across much of the United States. At its World War II peak, almost 426,000 prisoners - 371,683 German, 50,273 Italian, and 3,915 Japanese - were held in the United States. Beginning with 1,881 POWs in the United States at the end of 1942, was up to 172,879 by the end of 1943, and peaked at 425,871 on V-E Day.

From October 1943 Italian POWs were housed in Rio Grande Park in former Civilian Conservation Corps (CCC) barracks that had been built in the 1930s. The site was located north of the present day Rio Grande Zoo, founded in 1927. The Italian POWs all left six months later.

From 25 July 1944 until March 1946 German POWs, most of them captured in the North Africa campaigns, were housed in these same barracks buildings. The barracks had been moved to South 2nd Street and onto 8 acres (32,000 m^{2}) at the north end of the Schwartzman property, and made ready for their arrival.

Shifting prisoner populations and transfers were routine. This was done to remove pro-Nazi troublemakers, and to help break up escape attempts and their all tunnel digging teams. Still, three Germans did escape from Camp Albuquerque, but two were soon recaptured.

At peak occupancy, sometime in 1945, there were 171 German POWs in branch Camp Albuquerque. They worked on the various farms from Los Lunas to Corrales, helping in particular with the harvest in the fall.

== See also ==
- List of POW camps
- List of POW camps in Britain
- List of POW camps in Canada
- List of POW camps in the United States
