= Camp Skokie Valley =

Archaeological site in Glenview, Illinois, USA

- Glenview, Illinois, Cook County, Illinois
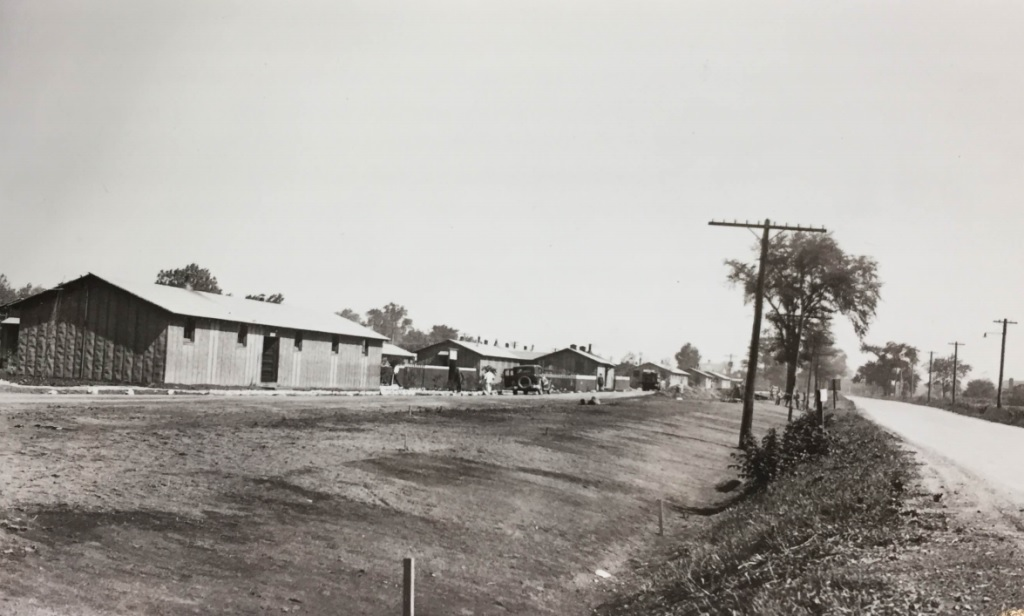
- Row of buildings at Camp Skokie Valley, 1934.

Site information
- Type: Work Camp; Army Post; Prisoner of War Camp
- Controlled by: U.S. Army

Location
- Coordinates: 42°04′41″N 87°46′24″W

Site history
- Built: 1933
- In use: 1933–1942 C.C.C. 1942–1946 Army

Garrison information
- Garrison: 740th Military Police Battalion

Camp Skokie Valley was a United States Army installation built in Glenview, Illinois, north of Chicago. Its archaeological remnants are found in Blue Star Memorial Woods, a property owned and managed by the Cook County Forest Preserve District.

Built in 1933 to house Civilian Conservation Corps laborers, working on the Skokie Lagoons Project, Camp Skokie Valley was left abandoned in 1942 and became a regular Army garrison. The camp was home to the 740th Military Police Battalion, a Zone of the Interior unit responsible for protecting defense plants and government assets in the Chicago and Milwaukee areas. A portion of the installation housed German prisoners of war in 1945.

== History ==
=== Civilian Conservation Corps ===
In June 1933, the Civilian Conservation Corps (CCC) began construction of the Skokie Lagoons in northern Cook County, Illinois. The project involved the digging of seven lagoons and interlocking channels, moving 4 million cubic years of earth, on the Skokie Marsh. Human activity had severely degraded the wetlands which became a stagnant bog during spring flooding, posing a nuisance to farmers and the surrounding communities. Initially 1,150 laborers organized into five CCC companies were assigned to the project.

Four of the companies camped on a farmer's field in Winnetka. The fifth consisted of a segregated unit made up of black enrollees, which was placed on property belonging to the Cook County Forest Preserve District (FPDCC) in Glenview at the intersection of Lake Avenue and Harms Road. A few months into the project; however, the CCC relocated its companies in Winnetka to the Glenview site, following a dispute over rental fees with the farmer.

Skokie Valley Park CCC Camp, later renamed to Camp Skokie Valley, started out as a tent city. The construction of wooden barracks and other buildings began on October 9, 1933, and by February of next year, a total of 115 buildings were built. The facilities could accommodate ten companies totaling 2,000 men. With the typical camp accommodating just a single company of approximately 200 enrollees, Camp Skokie Valley stood out as one of the largest in the CCC.

Racial tension existed at the camp. In late 1938, twenty-three black enrollees protested against poor food and labor conditions. These men were subsequently discharged from CCC service and returned home.

=== World War II ===
The CCC abandoned Camp Skokie Valley in March 1942, shortly after the United States entered World War II. In September of that year the camp was garrisoned by the 740th Military Police Battalion. A Zone of the Interior unit, the battalion was tasked with protecting defense plants and public utilities, along with maintaining internal security, in the Chicago and Milwaukee areas. Many of its members were employed part time by local business short on manpower, such as the Baxter Laboratories, Inc. production facility in Glenview. The battalion remained in Glenview until the camp was inactivated in 1946.

Late in the war the north end of the camp was converted to house German prisoners of war. Over two hundred German prisoners were housed at the camp from March to September 1945. These men were employed as laborers on Army installations and government warehouses in Chicago. The PoW enclosure at Camp Skokie Valley was a branch camp of Fort Sheridan where over 1,300 PoWs were held.
