= Camp Ono =

Former US Army camp in California

Camp Ono San Bernardino Engineer Depot Base General Depot Mira Loma Quartermaster Repair Sub-Depot
- Location within California
- 34°12′23″N 117°23′06″W
- Location: San Bernardino, California

History
- Built: 1942

Site notes
- Area: 1,662.82 acres (672.92 ha)
- Architect: US Army

The U.S. Army's Camp Ono existed from 1942 to 1947 in Southern California on 300 acres of land. The camp was four miles northwest of the City of San Bernardino, California.

It was used for housing of 499 Italian Prisoners of War and as a US Army Depot. Nearby and connected with the camp was the San Bernardino Engineer Depot, Base General Depot and Mira Loma Quartermaster Repair Sub-Depot. Lt. Col. Charles E. Stafford was the commander of the Depot and camp. The depot supplied parts of the vast Desert Training Center. Italian Service Units of the 101st, 106th and 318th Italian Engineer Base Depot Company worked at the San Bernardino Engineer Depot. The Italian Service Units maintain army vehicles, tanks, did tent repair and tent dyeing. The depot also trained troops on how to run supply depot overseas. The only supplies not handled at the depot was ordnance. At it peak the depot had 15,000 field troops and a field hospital with 1,100 beds. The depot was served by a station used by both AT & SF and Union Pacific, but the only a primitive dirt road. Many of the Italians at the depot came from Cucamonga, California were they picked oranges and grapes for the local farmers. The Italian Service Units returned to Italy in November 1945. All operations were closed on June 30, 1947. and was later converted to a truck and munitions cleaning site. Several of the solvents used in the cleaning process were later discovered to be toxic. and the contaminated site is now part of the Newmark Ground Water Contamination Superfund site.

== See also ==
- California during World War II
