= Windfall, Indiana =

- Town
- Location of Windfall City in Tipton County, Indiana.
- Coordinates: 40°21′43″N 85°57′30″W
- Country: United States
- State: Indiana
- County: Tipton
- Township: Wildcat
- Founded: 1853
- Incorporated: March 24, 1871
- Founder: James B. Fouch

Area
  - Total: 0.41 sq mi (1.05 km^{2})
  - Land: 0.41 sq mi (1.05 km^{2})
  - Water: 0 sq mi (0.00 km^{2})
- Elevation: 866 ft (264 m)

Population (2020)
  - Total: 696
  - Density: 1,717.9/sq mi (663.28/km^{2})
- Time zone: UTC-5 (Eastern (EST))
  - Summer (DST): UTC-4 (EDT)
- ZIP code: 46076
- Area code: 765
- FIPS code
- GNIS feature ID: 2397748
- Website: Town of Windfall

Windfall is a town in Wildcat Township, Tipton County, in the U.S. state of Indiana. It is part of the Kokomo, Indiana, Metropolitan Statistical Area. Windfall's population was 697 as of the 2021 census.

== History ==
=== Founding ===
Windfall was founded by James B. Fouch in 1853. Fouch platted the land with the goal of securing a train station in order to earn business from the lucrative lumber trade. He built the first sawmill in 1853. A Christian church was built just outside Windfall in 1854. The congregation moved to Windfall in 1866. A Methodist church was organized in Windfall in 1857, with meetings taking place in a school house. The Windfall post office has been in operation since 1855.

There is no definitive history explaining how Windfall was named, but a niece of James B. Fouch told a local newspaper in 1949, “The story has been told to me that Windfall was named by my uncle after a terrific windstorm had swept through the village.”

The village was incorporated on March 24, 1871 by a unanimous vote of the people who had settled there. As other settlers came to the village it grew opposite from the way Fouch intended. As a result, Windfall's Main Street, the original street, is southwest from the center of the town. That same year, the Windfall Baptist church was founded.

=== Crime in the 1800s ===
Windfall has a notable crime history dating from just after its incorporation. In 1865, Noble Goff, a man once described as "respectable..but in later years had fallen into heavy dissipation and had made many enemies," was murdered with a hatchet while in bed. His wife was charged with his murder and served her time in prison. Henry Thomas was killed by a local doctor, Armstrong, in 1864 or 1865. He killed Thomas out of "jealousy," and claimed he was not guilty upon trial. The doctor was acquitted.

A few years later a man named Perry was killed in a local saloon over a game of cards. In 1867, a man named Gifford was killed by James Stewart. The two men entered into a fight at Stewart's house and Stewart shot him. He was acquitted for self-defense. Finally, the work of a suspected arson burned down a large brick drug store and the nearby home of Dr. McAlaster in 1883.

=== 1900s ===
As of the 20th century, the town was described as being "one of the most attractive communities in Tipton County." A large Methodist church was built and completed in September 1913. It cost $28,000 to build.

=== World War II ===
From 1944 to 1945 Windfall was home to a World War II German POW camp, Windfall Indiana World War II POW Camp.

=== Notable residents ===
Windfall was the childhood home of Jeff Modisett, Indiana Attorney General (1997–2000).

=== Geography ===
According to the 2010 census, Windfall has a total area of 0.29 square miles (0.75 km^{2}), all land.

== Demographics ==
Historical population
Census	Pop.	Note	%±
1880	570		—
1890	561		−1.6%
1900	957		70.6%
1910	899		−6.1%
1920	801		−10.9%
1930	734		−8.4%
1940	835		13.8%
1950	963		15.3%
1960	1,135		17.9%
1970	946		−16.7%
1980	911		−3.7%
1990	779		−14.5%
2000	712		−8.6%
2010	708		−0.6%
2020	696		−1.7%
U.S. Decennial Census

=== 2010 census ===
As of the census of 2010, there were 708 people, 279 households, and 190 families residing in the town. The population density was 2,441.4 inhabitants per square mile (942.6/km^{2}). There were 324 housing units at an average density of 1,117.2 per square mile (431.4/km^{2}). The racial makeup of the town was 97.2% White, 0.3% African American, 0.3% Native American, 0.3% Asian, 1.1% from other races, and 0.8% from two or more races. Hispanic or Latino of any race were 5.4% of the population.

There were 279 households, of which 33.7% had children under the age of 18 living with them, 52.7% were married couples living together, 11.1% had a female householder with no husband present, 4.3% had a male householder with no wife present, and 31.9% were non-families. 28.3% of all households were made up of individuals, and 14.4% had someone living alone who was 65 years of age or older. The average household size was 2.54 and the average family size was 3.10.

The median age in the town was 38.8 years. 25.4% of residents were under the age of 18; 8.8% were between the ages of 18 and 24; 25.8% were from 25 to 44; 24.5% were from 45 to 64; and 15.5% were 65 years of age or older. The gender makeup of the town was 49.4% male and 50.6% female.

=== 2000 census ===
As of the census of 2000, there were 712 people, 291 households, and 208 families residing in the town. The population density was 2,444.4 inhabitants per square mile (943.8/km^{2}). There were 307 housing units at an average density of 1,054.0 per square mile (407.0/km^{2}). The racial makeup of the town was 99.30% White, 0.14% Native American, and 0.56% from two or more races. Hispanic or Latino of any race were 0.98% of the population.

There were 291 households, out of which 30.9% had children under the age of 18 living with them, 58.8% were married couples living together, 9.6% had a female householder with no husband present, and 28.5% were non-families. 25.8% of all households were made up of individuals, and 10.3% had someone living alone who was 65 years of age or older. The average household size was 2.45 and the average family size was 2.92.

In the town, the population was spread out, with 24.2% under the age of 18, 7.6% from 18 to 24, 29.2% from 25 to 44, 25.1% from 45 to 64, and 13.9% who were 65 years of age or older. The median age was 37 years. For every 100 females, there were 95.1 males. For every 100 females age 18 and over, there were 90.1 males.

The median income for a household in the town was $40,000, and the median income for a family was $46,786. Males had a median income of $32,857 versus $24,375 for females. The per capita income for the town was $18,948. About 8.7% of families and 9.7% of the population were below the poverty line, including 11.2% of those under age 18 and 13.6% of those age 65 or over.

=== Early census ===
As of the census of 1910, there were 890 people. In 1900, there were 957 people. As of 1890, there were 561 people.

== Economy ==
=== 1800s ===
Just after Windfall founder James B. Fouch built the first sawmill in 1853, Josiah Ross built the first home in the town, which he used as a general store. Multiple storehouses were built by 1859, buying and selling products, including grain, to business via the railroad. A factory for stave manufacturing was built in 1865. In 1873, the Windfall Steam Flouring Mill was founded. A felloe factory was built in 1877 by Thornburgh and Hirons.

=== 1900s ===
By 1914, the most lucrative industry in Windfall was canning, specifically tomatoes. The most prominent cannery was the Royal Canning Company.

== Infrastructure ==
=== Utilities ===
Historically, the town was provided natural gas by the Windfall Gas Company. The Indian Union Traction Company supplied Windfall with electric lighting in 1913.

=== Healthcare ===
As of 1914, Windfall had its own hospital. It has since closed.

== Education ==
Windfall has a public library, a branch of the Tipton County Public Library.
