= Camp Thomas A. Scott =

Coordinates: 41.057495°N 85.096570°W

Camp Thomas A. Scott, located in Fort Wayne, Indiana, was a Railway Operating Battalion training center for the Pennsylvania Railroad from 1942 to 1944 and a prisoner of war camp during World War II. It was named for Thomas A. Scott, who served as the fourth president of the Pennsylvania Railroad from 1874 to 1880. As the United States Assistant Secretary of War in 1861, Scott was instrumental in using railroads for military purposes during the American Civil War.

== Pennsylvania Railroad Training Center ==
Camp Scott was built in August 1942 as a training camp for U.S. Army Railway Operating Battalions. This made sense because Fort Wayne was a major hub for the Pennsylvania Railroad, and Camp Scott was constructed adjacent to Pennsylvania Railroad lines. The 717th, the 730th, and the 750th Railway Operating Battalions were all trained on Pennsylvania Railroad lines in Fort Wayne. The last battalion was deployed from Camp Scott in mid-1944.

== Prisoner of war camp ==
Camp Scott was a branch camp of Camp Perry in Ohio. Camp Scott housed approximately 600 prisoners of war. Most of these prisoners were German and had served in the Afrika Korps, although some were Italians captured at the Battle of Anzio and the Battle of Monte Cassino in Italy. Like the rest of the United States, Fort Wayne suffered labor shortages due to wartime enlistment, and prisoners from Camp Scott were put to work in Fort Wayne and surrounding areas of Allen County, Indiana. Prisoners weeded and harvested potatoes for local farmers, cleared snow from Fort Wayne streets, and set pins at a local bowling alley. Following VE Day, the prisoners were gradually repatriated, and Camp Scott officially closed on November 16, 1945.

== Uses after 1945 ==
Camp Scott sat dormant until January 1946, when the Fort Wayne Housing Authority began the process of converting camp buildings into much-needed housing for returning American veterans and their families. In the years following, more housing was built in Fort Wayne, and the families living at Camp Scott gradually relocated to other homes. Camp Scott served as a temporary housing facility until August 1949. Over the next decades, the buildings were torn down, with the last building being demolished in 1977.

The City of Fort Wayne converted some of the land on which Camp Scott stood into a constructed wetland. It also serves as a facility for storing and treating stormwater run-off.
