= 1945 Utah prisoner of war massacre =

Mass shooting of German POWs in the United States

Utah prisoner of war massacre
- Part of the American theater of World War II
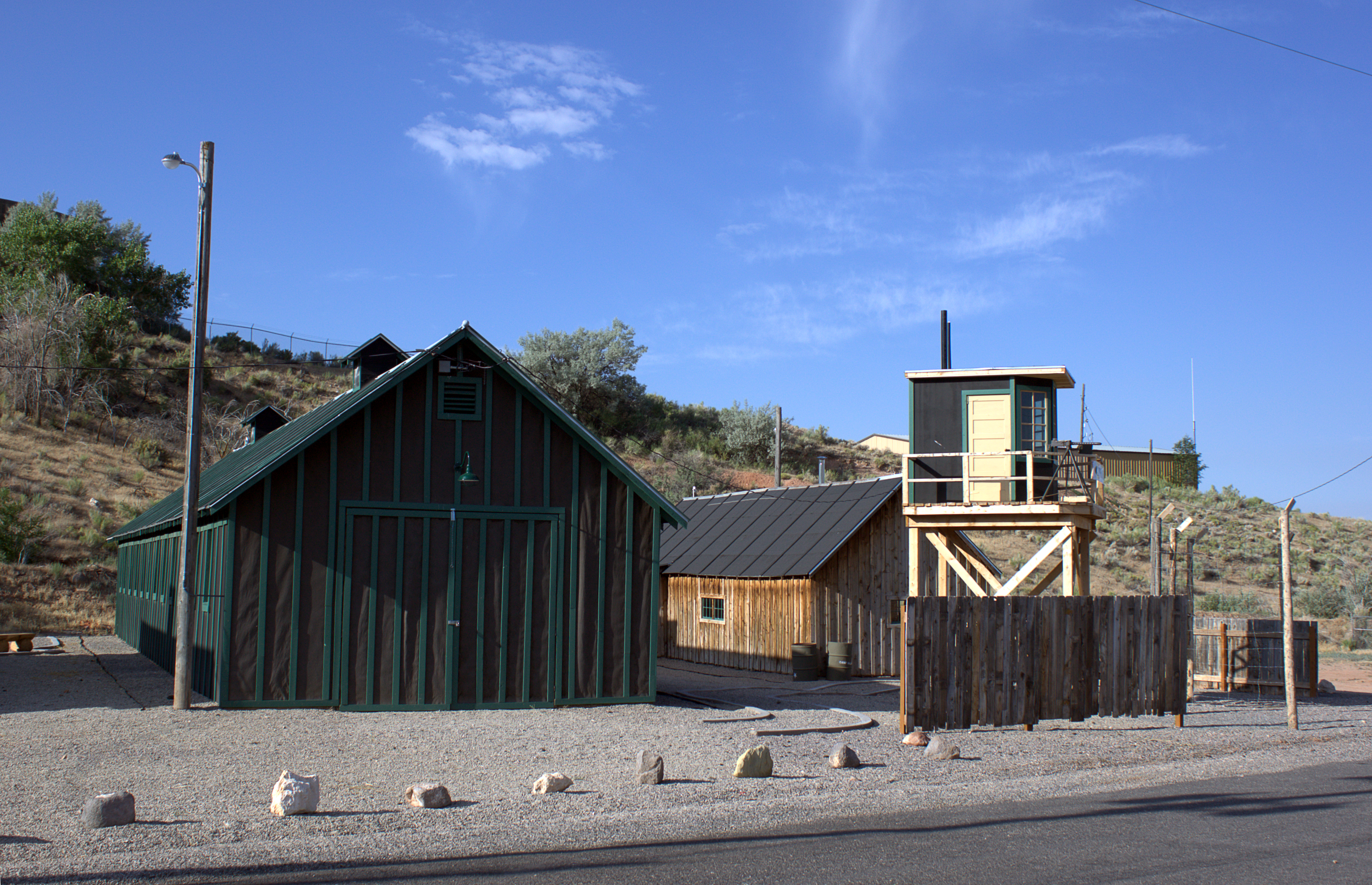
- Camp Salina in 2018

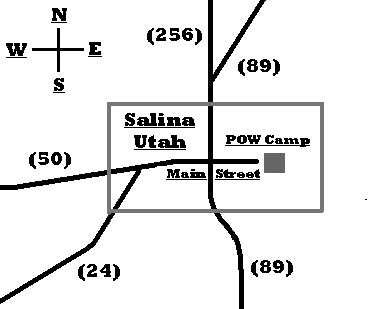
- Location: 38.95767°N 111.84777°W; Salina, Utah, United States
- Date: July 8, 1945; 12:00 midnight (MST)
- Target: German prisoners of war
- Attack type: Mass shooting, war crime, hate crime
- Weapon: .30 caliber M1917 Browning machine gun
- Deaths: 9
- Injuries: 19
- Perpetrator: Clarence V. Bertucci
- Motive: Anti-German sentiment aggravated by mental instability

The Utah prisoner of war massacre (headlined by Time as the Midnight Massacre) took place after the end of World War II in Europe at midnight on July 8, 1945, at a prisoner-of-war camp for German and Italian soldiers in Salina, Utah, United States. Nine German prisoners of war were murdered and nineteen prisoners were wounded by American private Clarence V. Bertucci, who was on guard duty in the camp. After a night out, Bertucci returned to camp around midnight to assume his night duty at the guard tower. Bertucci subsequently loaded the .30-caliber M1917 Browning machine gun on the tower and fired at the tents of the sleeping prisoners. After the massacre, he revealed his motivation: "he had hated Germans, so he had killed Germans." Six Germans were immediately killed, two died in Salina's hospital, one died in an army hospital, and nineteen were wounded. It is the deadliest mass shooting in Utah’s history.

The victims were buried with full military honors at the Fort Douglas Cemetery. The wounded prisoners were repatriated to Germany after they were healthy enough to travel. After the massacre, Bertucci was taken into custody with minimal resistance. He was evaluated for a few weeks, before doctors determined that he was "mentally unbalanced". Military officers forwent a court-martial on account of insanity and he was sent to Mason General Hospital in New York for an undisclosed amount of time. The “Midnight Massacre” is remembered for being "the worst massacre at a POW camp in U.S. history.” A museum was opened at Camp Salina in 2016.

== Background ==
During World War II, Utah was home to around 15,000 Italian and German prisoners that were distributed across several camps. Camp Salina was a small, temporary branch camp meant to accommodate overflow prisoners from Fort Douglas in Salt Lake City. It was occupied from 1944 to 1945 by about 250 Germans, most of whom were from the Afrika Korps. It was a simple complex: forty-three tents with wooden floors, an officer's quarters, and three guard towers around the perimeter. Before it became a prisoner of war camp, Camp Salina was a Civilian Conservation Corps facility. Unlike many other American prison camps, which were built in isolated areas, Camp Salina was located within the small town of Salina, at the eastern end of Main Street. The Germans had been sent there to help with the harvest of sugar beets and other produce, and, according to Pat Bagley of the Salt Lake Tribune, were well-behaved and friendly to the locals.

Soldiers unfit for front line service, such as those with behavioral problems, were typically assigned to guard duty at the camp. Private Clarence Vincent Bertucci was born in New Orleans on September 14, 1921. He dropped out of school in the sixth grade, and then joined the United States Army in 1940. After five years of service, including one tour to England with an artillery unit, Bertucci seemed to be incapable of being promoted and also had a "discipline problem". According to later testimony, he was unsatisfied with his tour and said that he felt "cheated" out of his chance to kill Germans. He was also quoted as saying, "Someday I will get my Germans; I will get my turn." Apart from overtly expressing his hatred of Germans, Bertucci did not show any indications of what he was planning to do in the days before the massacre. He was 23 years old at the time of the massacre.

== Massacre ==
On the night of July 7, 1945, Bertucci was out drinking; he drank several glasses of beer. He stopped at a café on Main Street to have some coffee and to speak with a waitress, telling her "something exciting is going to happen tonight", before reporting for guard duty back at the camp. After the midnight changing of the guard, Bertucci waited for the previous watch to go to bed, before he climbed up the guard tower nearest to the officer's quarters, loaded the .30-caliber M1917 Browning machine gun that was mounted at the position, and opened fire on the tents of sleeping Germans. Moving the gun back and forth, Bertucci hit thirty of the forty-three tents before being removed from the tower by another soldier. Bertucci was quoted to have said "Get more ammo! I'm not done yet!"

With three trigger pulls, the firing lasted about fifteen seconds, long enough to fire 250 rounds of ammunition. Lt. Albert I. Cornell demanded Bertucci come down from the tower. He refused because, "some of them [Germans] are still alive". After another guard was sent to bring him down, Bertucci was reportedly taken into custody without any resistance. Despite his drinking prior to the incident, he was not found to be intoxicated upon arrest. Guards kept a close watch for prisoner retaliation, but there was none. Six of the Germans were killed outright, two later died in Salina's hospital, one died in an army hospital, and nineteen others were wounded. There was reportedly not enough room in the hospital, so many prisoners were treated on the hospital lawn. One of the prisoners was "nearly cut in half" by the machine gun fire, although he managed to survive for six hours. It was said that "blood flowed out the front door" of the hospital.

The victims were:

- Otto Bross (b. 16 November 1919), Pforzheim, age 25, single
- Ernst Fuchs (b. 19 January 1921), Kirchberg, Rhein-Hunsrück, age 24, single
- Gottfried Gaag (b. 3 June 1916, Nordrhein-Westfalen), age 29, single
- Georg Liske (b. 16 August 1913), age 31, wife Antonie Liske
- Hans Meyer (b. 29 August 1920), age 24, single
- Adolf Paul (b. 5 February 1917), age 28, single
- Fritz Stockmann (b. 23 January 1921), age 24, single
- Walter Vogel (b. 17 December 1912), Rossach, Franconia, wife Emma Vogel
- Friedrich Ritter (b. 13 November 1896) died of his wounds five days later, age 48, wife Berta Ritter.

The Piqua Daily Call reported, "Clarence V Bertucci was under mental observation today [July 10] after admitting that he sprayed gun bullets on a group of war prisoners while they slept, killing eight and wounding 19 because he 'just didn't like Germans'." An article from the Chillicothe Constitution-Tribune reported that Bertucci showed no remorse about the shooting at a hearing conducted shortly after the massacre.

A July 23, 1945, article from Time stated,

Ninth Service Command officers admitted that Bertucci's record already showed two courts-martial, one in England. His own calm explanation seemed a little too simple: he had hated Germans, so he had killed Germans.

Although there were rumors that Bertucci committed the murders in order to avenge the death of a loved one in Europe, his mother confirmed this was false. She did, however, tell reporters that she believed his actions were due to an appendectomy he received five years prior to the massacre. She told the New York Times, "something must have happened to him as a result of the spinal injection, otherwise he would never have shot those men."

== Aftermath ==
Immediately following the attack, Bertucci was placed under guard at Ninth Service Command headquarters at Fort Douglas. His army record revealed that he had been punished for three offenses: once for being absent from his post, once for refusing to go on guard duty, and once for missing a train. He was additionally hospitalized 12 times during his service, several of which were mental examinations. Army officers initially cited the reason for the attack as insanity. Captain Wayne Owens of an Ogden POW camp was assigned to investigate the incident. In contrast to the initial conclusion of the army officers, Owens concluded that Bertucci was sane and should be court-martialed. Owens's superiors, however, claimed that Owens had no authority to judge the sanity of a man. Owens responded that a man is sane until proven insane. Owens scrapped his initial report, but still recommended that Bertucci be court-martialed. Owens claimed there was no evidence that Bertucci had been drinking or was unfit for duty and as a result, the act was calculated and of murderous intent. Some disagreed with Owens's claim; some telegrams showed sympathy for Bertucci and the massacre. Major Stanley L. Richter of the Prisoner of War Operations in United States Army Provost Marshal General's office reported that, after receiving an initial report of the investigation, there was a possibility of court-martialing Bertucci. However, Bertucci had been evaluated for several weeks at Bushnell Army Hospital in Brigham City, Utah. Doctors concluded that he was "mentally unbalanced". Foregoing a court-martial, Bertucci was found to be insane by a panel of military officials, and hospitalized in Mason General Hospital in Brentwood, New York, for an undisclosed amount of time. He died on December 2, 1969.

The victims were buried with full military honors at Fort Douglas Cemetery on July 12. They were dressed in khaki American uniforms, but there were no flags on the caskets because the Flag of Nazi Germany had been banned and there was no new German flag available at that time. Each casket was adorned with two wreaths made from roses, gardenias, and carnations. Fifteen prisoners from Salina attended the memorial. A seventeen-member choir from the Ogden camp sang "Song from the Monks", "Good Comrade", and "Down in the Valley". American soldiers made sure no Nazi songs were sung. A second service was held for Friedrich Ritter who died in the hospital July 14. There were significant delays in notifying family members about the dead prisoners, and legal obstacles made it difficult for family members to receive financial compensation from the deaths. The wounded soldiers were sent back to Germany when they were deemed healthy enough for the journey. A German agreement with the U.S. government prevented wounded prisoners from getting American compensation from their injuries, and they were only entitled to the same benefits offered for German veterans. A statue called the German War Memorial has been placed at the cemetery. In 1988, the German Air Force funded the refurbishment of the statue. A ceremony was held on Volkstrauertag, the German national day of mourning, and two of the prisoners who were wounded in 1945 attended.

On November 12, 2016, a museum on the site of Camp Salina was opened to the public. The Utah prisoner of war massacre is known as the largest killing of enemy prisoners in the United States during World War II.

== See also ==
- Xenophobia
- List of rampage killers in the United States
- Allied war crimes during World War II
- List of massacres in Utah
- Military history of the United States during World War II
- United States home front during World War II
