= Trimmingham =

Trimmingham is a surname. Notable people with the surname include:

- Ernest Trimmingham (1880–1942), Bermudian actor
- Josiah Trimmingham (born 1996), Trinidadian professional footballer
- Leon Trimmingham (born 1971), American basketball player
- Rupert Trimmingham (1899–1985), United States Army corporal
