= Yank, the Army Weekly =

American magazine during World War II

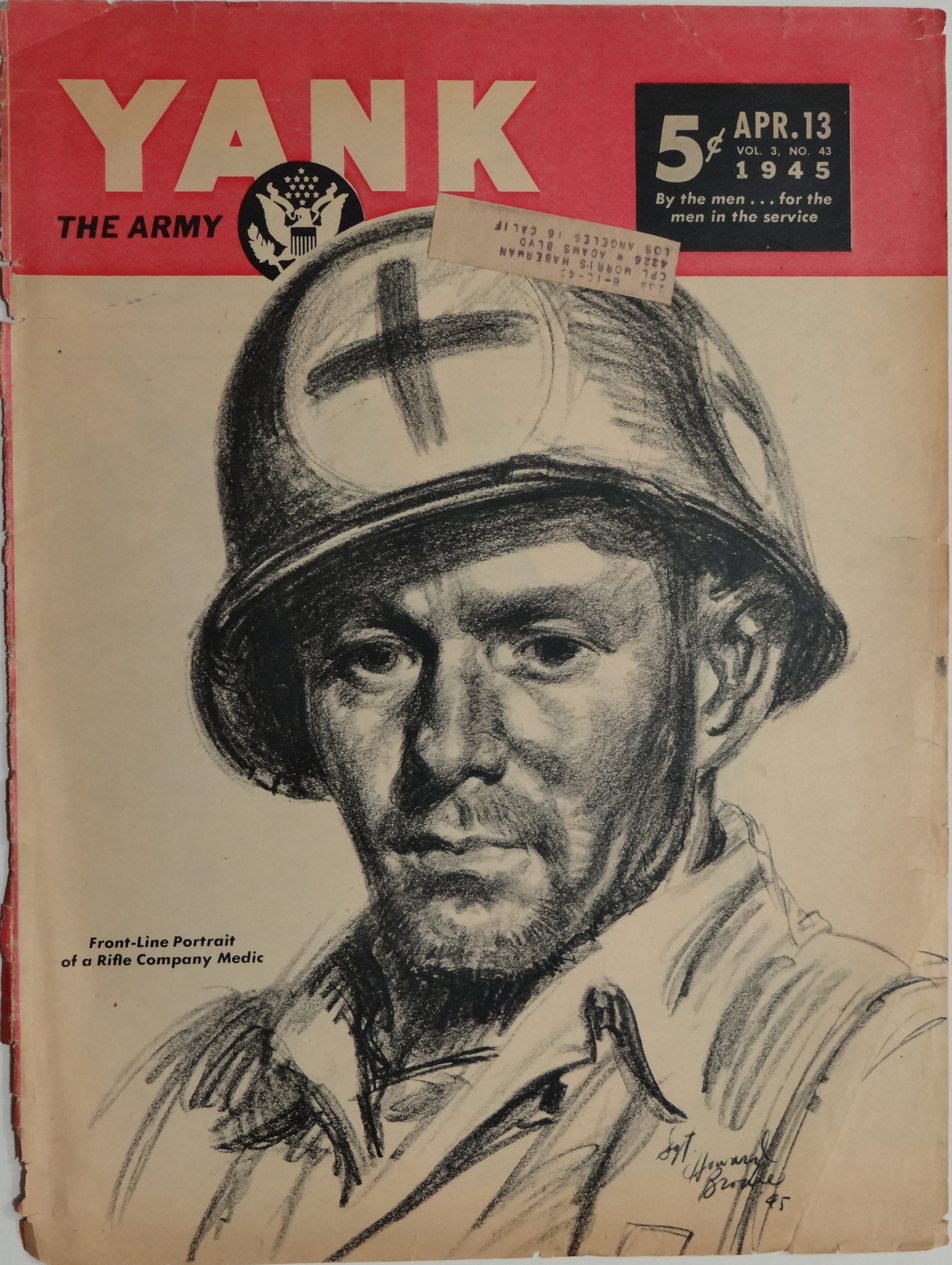
- Yank, The Army Weekly, April 13, 1945; Cover art of Rifle Company Medic by Sgt Howard Brodie
- Frequency: Weekly
- First issue: June 17, 1942; 84 years ago
- Final issue: December 28, 1945
- Company: United States Army
- Country: United States
- Based in: New York City
- Language: English

Yank, the Army Weekly was a weekly magazine published by the United States military during World War II. One of its most popular features, intended to boost the morale of military personnel serving overseas, was the weekly publication of a pin-up photograph.

== History ==
The idea for the magazine came from Egbert White, who had worked on the newspaper Stars and Stripes during World War I. He proposed the idea to the Army in early 1942, and accepted a commission as lieutenant colonel. White was the overall commander, Major Franklin S. Forsberg was the business manager and Major Hartzell Spence was the first editor. White was removed from the Yank staff because of disagreements about articles which had appeared. Soon afterward, Spence was also assigned to other duties and Joe McCarthy became the editor.

The first issue was published with the cover date of June 17, 1942, as a 24-page weekly tabloid, with no ads, costing five cents. The magazine was written by enlisted rank (EM) soldiers with a few officers as managers, and initially was made available only to the US Army overseas. By the fifth issue of July 15, 1942, it was made available to serving members within the US. It was never made available on the newsstands for public purchase. Yank's circulation exceeded 2.5 million in 41 countries with 21 editions.

The last issue was published on December 28, 1945. Joe McCarthy remained the editor of Yank until the official closure of the office on New Year's Eve 1945.

== Trimmingham letter ==
The magazine's April 28, 1944, issue included a letter from a black corporal, Rupert Trimmingham, complaining that white German prisoners of war in the United States were being treated with more respect than black American soldiers. The reaction to the letter was strong and immediate. In a follow-up letter published 28 July 1944, Trimmingham said that he had received 287 letters, 183 from whites, supporting his position. The editors reported that Yank had received "a great number of comments from GIs, almost all of whom were outraged by the treatment given to the corporal." The same year, the letter inspired a short story by Robert E. McLaughlin, "A Short Wait between Trains," and in 1945, a one-act play by Ruth Moore.

== Artists and photographers ==
Sketch artists such as Robert Greenhalgh, Victor Kalin and Howard Brodie worked on the magazine, which also featured the "G.I. Joe" cartoons by Dave Breger and the Sad Sack cartoons by Sgt. George Baker. Yank also featured cartoons by Bil Keane, who would later create The Family Circus, and artist and author Jack Coggins spent over two years with the publication, first in New York, then in London, producing illustrations and articles in more than 24 issues. John Bushemi was a photographer, who photographed the Pacific War and provided covers for Yank.

== Revival ==
In 2014, the 1st Stryker Brigade Combat Team, 1st Armored Division, Fort Bliss, Texas, revived Yank as the official publication for the brigade. Each cover of the 1/1 Yank features soldiers from the brigade recreating a cover photo from the original Yank magazine.

== Image gallery ==
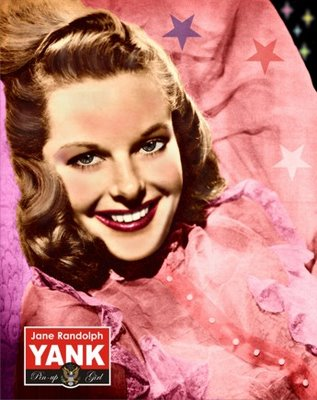
1

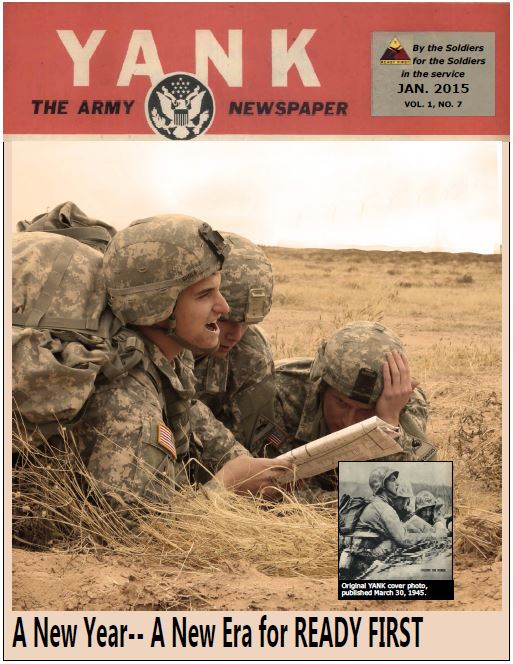
2

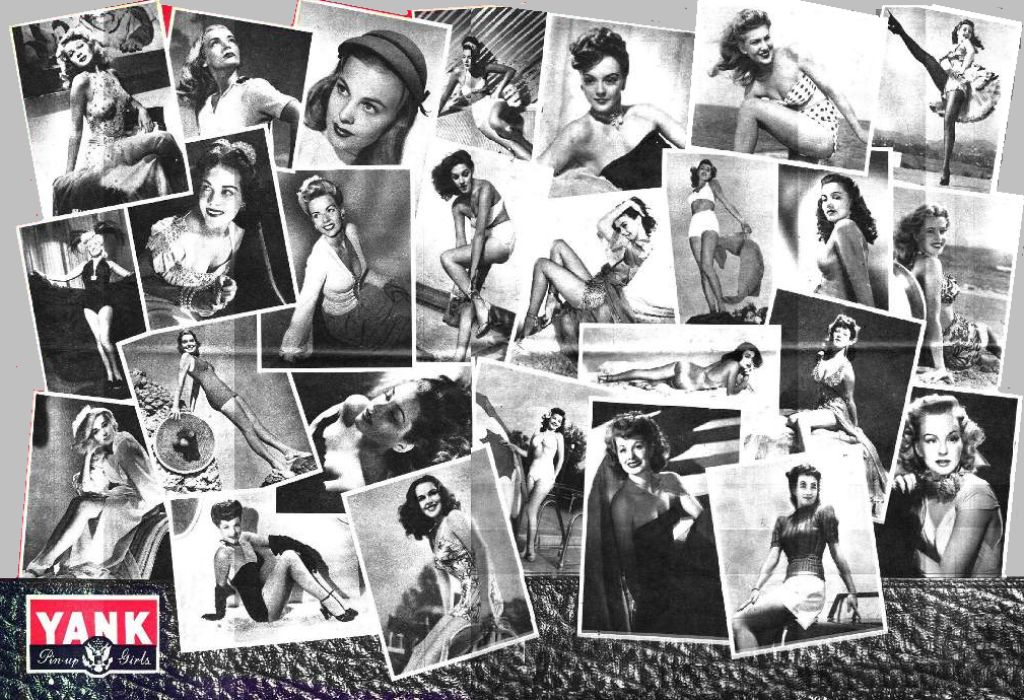
3

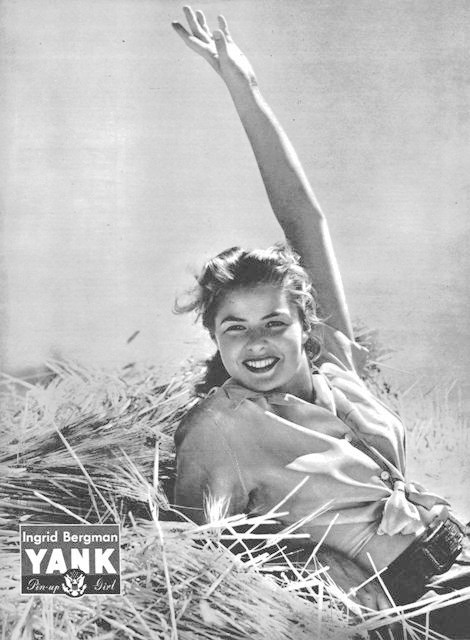
4

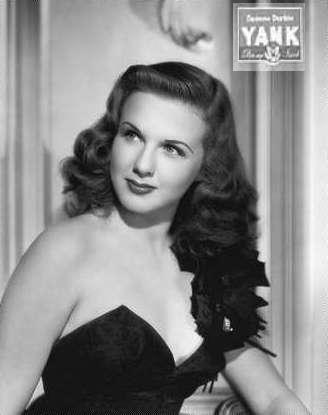
5

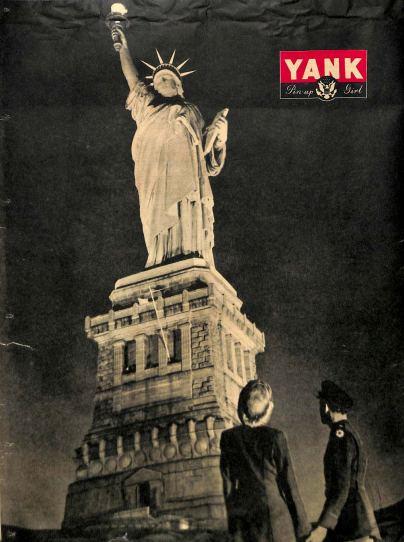
6

7

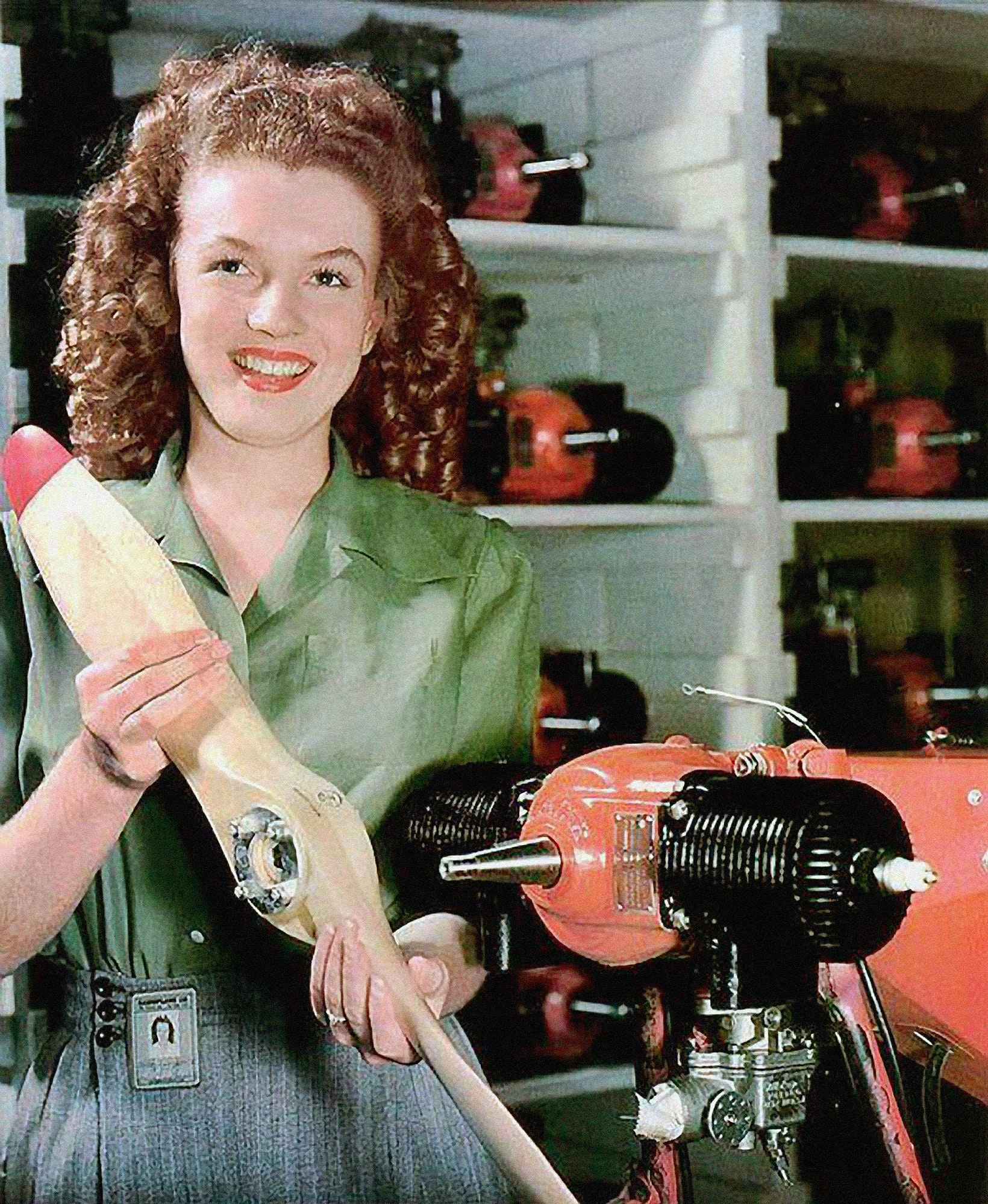
8

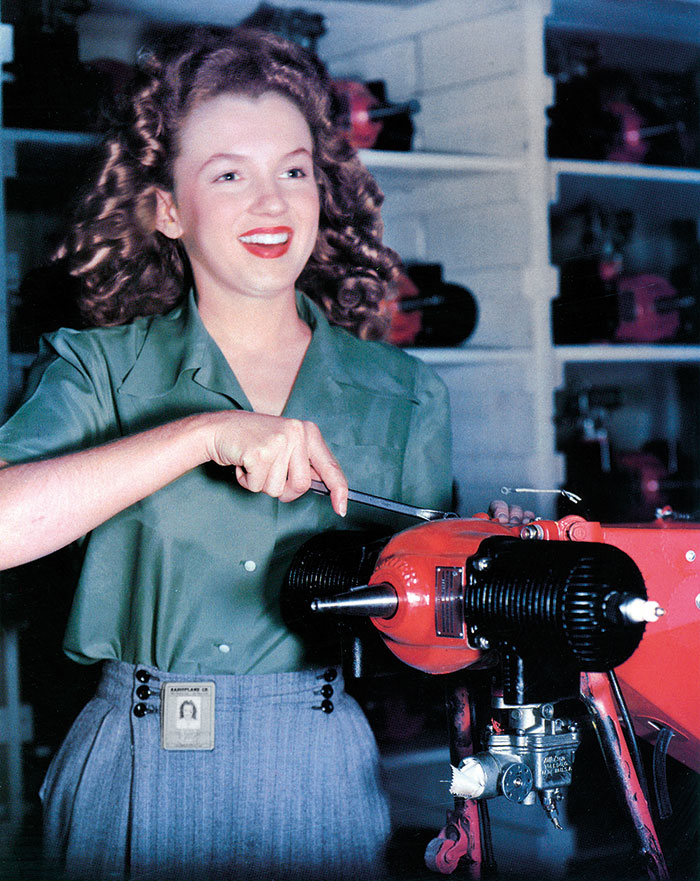
9

1. Jane Randolph for the debut June 17, 1942 issue. 2. January 2015 cover photo of 1/1 AD YANK magazine. Three infantrymen with Bravo Company, 3rd Battalion, 41st Infantry Regiment, 1st Brigade, 1st Armored Division, recreate the original Yank cover photo from March 30, 1945. 3. Collage of Yank pin-ups, published in the final issue, December 28, 1945. 4. Ingrid Bergman was the Pin-up Girl on 16 March 1945. 5. Deanna Durbin was the Pin-up Girl on 19 January 1945. 6. The Statue of Liberty featured as the Pin-up Girl at the end of World War II. 7. A 1945 interview with baseball player Jackie Robinson — written shortly before his joining the Montreal Royals. 8. A photo of Norma Jeane Dougherty (who later adopted the stage name Marilyn Monroe) on 26 June 1945 (photo shooting 1944). 9. A photo of Norma Jeane Dougherty (who later adopted the stage name Marilyn Monroe) on 26 June 1945 (photo shooting 1944).
