= Der Ruf =

Der Ruf may refer to:

- Der Ruf, the German title of a 1949 German drama, known in English as The Last Illusion.
- Der Ruf, a World War II era POW newspaper, known in English as The Call.
