= German prisoners of war in the United States =

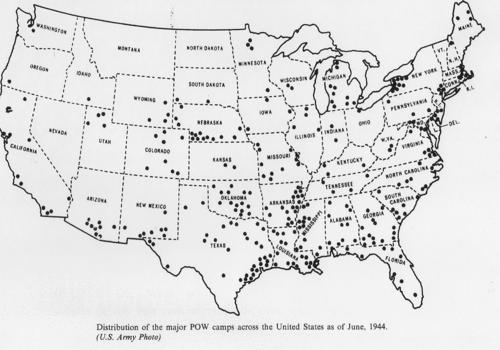
Major POW camps across the United States as of June 1944

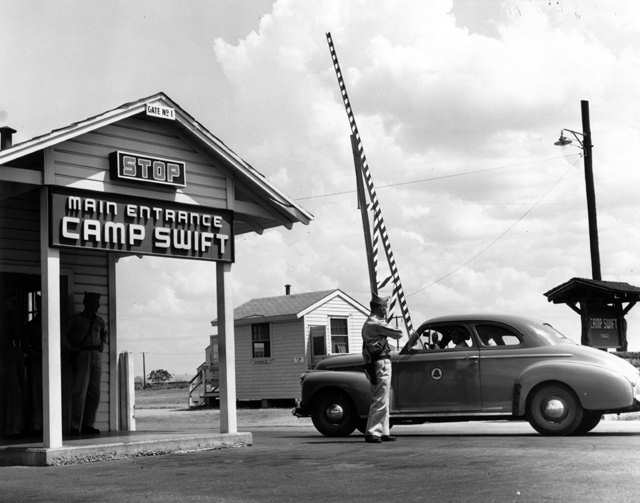
Entrance to Camp Swift in Texas, August 1944

Members of the German military were interned as prisoners of war in the continental United States during both World War I and World War II. A total of 425,000 German prisoners lived in 700 camps across the United States during World War II.

== World War I ==
Hostilities ended six months after the United States saw its first major combat action in World War I, and only a relatively small number of German prisoners of war reached the U.S. Many prisoners were German sailors caught in port by U.S. forces far away from the European battlefield. The first German POWs were sailors from SMS Cormoran, a German merchant raider anchored in Apra Harbor, Guam, on the day that war was declared.

The United States Department of War designated three locations as POW camps during the war: Fort McPherson and Fort Oglethorpe in Georgia and Douglas in Utah. The exact population of German POWs in World War I is difficult to ascertain because they were housed in the same facilities used for German-American internment, but there were known to be 406 German POWs at Fort Douglas and 1,373 at Fort McPherson. The prisoners built furniture and worked on local roads. The few dozen who died while incarcerated as POWs were buried at Ft. Douglas, Utah, the Chattanooga National Cemetery, and Fort Lyon, Colorado.

== World War II ==
=== Background ===
After the United States entered World War II in 1941, the government of the United Kingdom requested American help with housing prisoners of war due to a housing shortage in Britain, asking for the US to take 175,000 prisoners. The United States reluctantly agreed to house them, although it was not prepared. Its military had only brief experience with a limited POW population in the last world war, and was unprepared for basic logistical considerations such as food, clothing and housing requirements of the prisoners. Almost all German-speaking American men of military age were engaged overseas directly in combat efforts, and the American government feared the presence of native Germans on U.S. soil would create a security problem and raise fear among civilians.

Despite many "wild rumors" about how the Allies treated their prisoners, some Germans were pleased to be captured by the British or Americans; fear of being captured by the Soviets was widespread, as more than a million German POWs died in Soviet captivity. The prisoners were usually shipped in Liberty Ships returning home that would otherwise be empty, with as many as 30,000 arriving per month to ports in New York or Virginia, where they were processed for distribution to camps. While they risked being sunk by their own U-boats on the ocean, good treatment began with the substantial meals served aboard. Upon arriving in America, the comfort of the Pullman cars that carried them to their prison camps amazed the Germans, as did the country's large size and undamaged prosperity.

=== The Geneva Convention ===
==== The camps ====
The Office of the Provost Marshal General (OPMG) supervised the 425,000 German prisoners. They stayed in 700 camps; government guidelines mandated placing the compounds away from urban, industrial areas for security purposes, in regions with mild climate to minimize construction costs, and at sites where POWs could alleviate anticipated farm labor shortages. Most camps were in the southern or southwestern United States, away from important war factories, but 46 of 48 states hosted camps. A complete list may not exist because of the small, temporary nature of some camps and the frequent use of satellite or sub-camps administratively part of larger units; a minority, like Camp Ruston in Louisiana, were built specifically for prisoners.

Other than barbed wire and watchtowers, the camps resembled standard United States or German military training sites, with prisoners segregated by service branch and rank. The Geneva Convention of 1929 required the United States to provide living quarters comparable to those of its own military, which meant 40 square feet (3.7 m^{2}) for enlisted men and 120 square feet (11.1 m^{2}) for officers. If prisoners had to sleep in tents while their quarters were constructed, so did their guards. The three admirals and forty generals in custody were sent to Camp Clinton and Camp Shelby in Mississippi, where each had his own bungalow with a garden.

==== Work ====
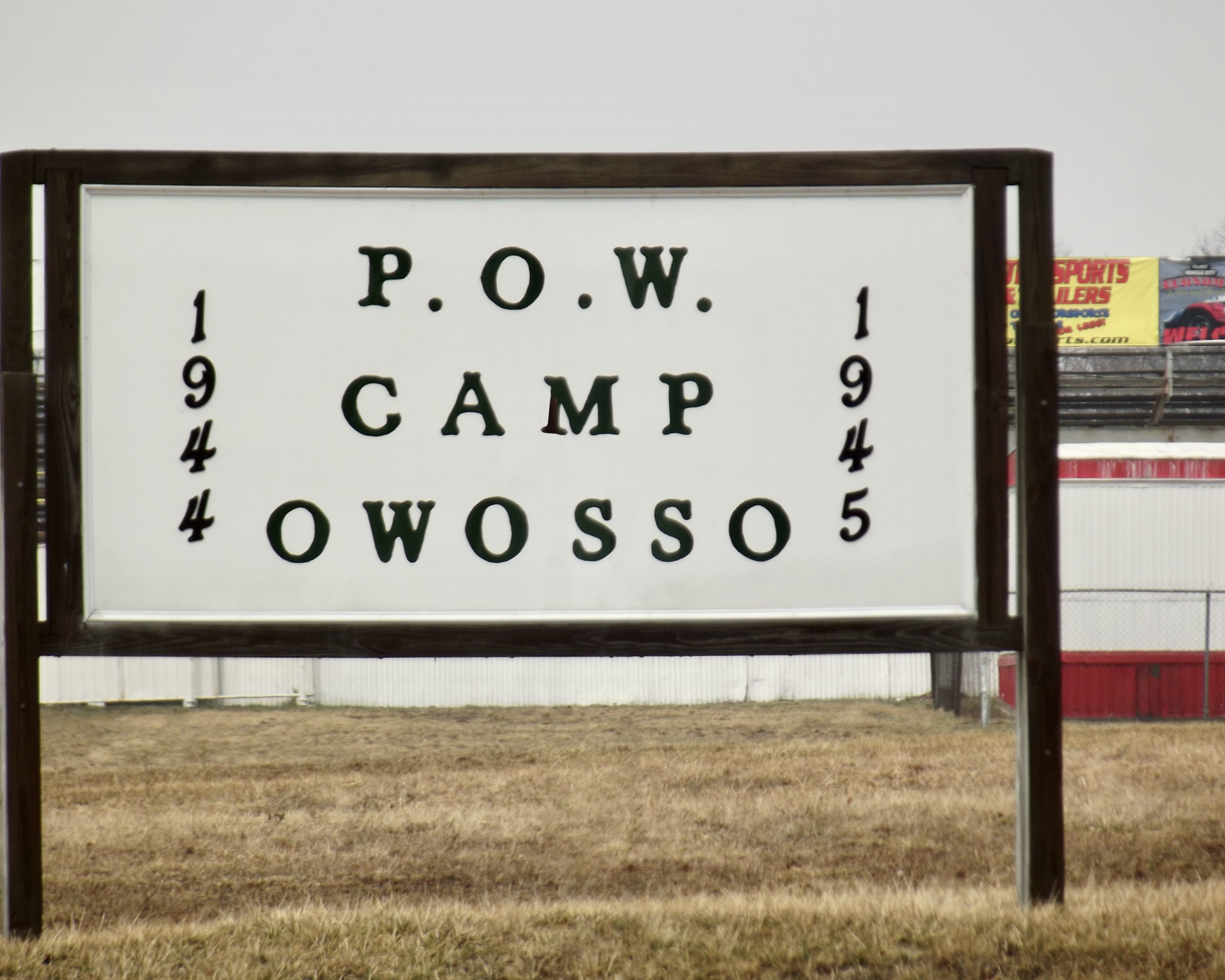
A current (2013) sign outside the Owosso, Michigan, WWII POW camp where German soldiers were held. The site had been and is currently the Owosso racetrack.

The Geneva Convention's mandate of equal treatment for prisoners also meant they were paid American military wages. They could work on farms or elsewhere only if they were also paid for their labor, and officers could not be compelled to work. As the United States sent millions of soldiers overseas, the resulting shortage of labor eventually meant that German POWs worked toward the Allied war effort by helping out in canneries, mills, farms, and other places deemed a minimal security risk.

A typical day for a German prisoner in Garden Grove, California:

- 5:30 am - Reveille
- 7:30 am - Work begins at fruit orchards around Orange County, California. Quota is 36 boxes of oranges per prisoner
- Noon - Lunch. Prisoners who had already filled their quotas returned to camp
- 4:30 pm - End of work day
- 5:30 pm - Dinner
- Evening - Educational classes, films, and live performances by prisoners
- 10 pm - Bedtime

Prisoners could not be used in work directly related to the military, or in dangerous conditions. The minimum pay for enlisted soldiers was $0.80 (equivalent to $16 in 2025) a day, roughly equivalent to the pay of an American private. In 1943 the government estimated that prisoner labor cost 50 to 75% of normal free labor. While language differences, risk of escape, and sometimes unreliable work were disadvantages, prisoner workers were available immediately on demand and in the exact numbers needed. While prisoners on average worked more slowly and produced less than civilians, their work was also more reliable and of higher quality. Prisoners who did not meet work quotas were imprisoned with bread and water as rations.

Part of the prisoners' wages helped pay for the upkeep of the POW program, while they could use the rest at the camp canteen, where fellow prisoners sold snacks, reading and writing material, playing cards, and tobacco products. They were paid in scrip; all hard currency in their possession was confiscated, along with other personal possessions during initial processing, for return after the war as mandated by the convention. The concern was that money could be used during escape attempts. The government received $22 million in 1944 from prisoner wages, and that year it estimated that it had saved $80 million by using prisoners in military installations.

Newspaper coverage of the camps and public knowledge were intentionally limited until the end of the war, in part to comply with the Geneva Convention and in part to avoid the fear of an enemy presence in such large numbers. While most citizens living near camps accepted the prisoners' presence, the government received hundreds of letters each week protesting their good treatment. Many demanded that the POWs be immediately killed, a sentiment the regular casualty lists in American newspapers encouraged. The government had difficulty in persuading the public that treating the prisoners according to the Geneva Convention made it more likely that Germany would treat American prisoners well in return. Labor unions were the largest opposition to the use of prisoner workers, citing the War Manpower Commission's rules that required union participation in worker recruitment whenever possible. Given the wartime labor shortage however, especially in agriculture, many valued their contribution; as late as February 1945, politicians in rural states asked the government for 100,000 more prisoners to work on farms.

=== Labor reports ===
Dos Palos POW Branch Camp (Firebaugh, California) Final Report

Twice each month each camp was required to fill out WD AGO Form 19-21 and mail it to the Office of the Provost Marshal General, Washington 25, D.C., Attention: Prisoner of War Operations Division.

The report included the camp's name and address, the nationality of the prisoners, the total number of prisoners broken down by the number of officers, NCOs and privates, and the number of man-days worked by project in that camp during the reporting period. Sometimes additional remarks were included on the back of the form. For example, the additional remarks from Dos Palos POW Branch Camp for the period ending 12 February 1946 stated "1692 [German POWs] waiting for Repatriation CAMP CLOSED 12 February 1946."

=== Camp life ===
There were insufficient American guards, especially German speakers. They mostly supervised the German officers and NCOs who strictly maintained discipline. After an American guard who had fought in the Battle of the Bulge killed prisoners in Texas, other guards were given psychiatric tests and removed from duty if necessary.

The Germans woke their own men, marched them to and from meals, and prepared them for work; their routine successfully recreated the feel of military discipline for prisoners. Prisoners had friendly interaction with local civilians and sometimes were allowed outside the camps without guards on the honor system (Black American soldiers, including Rupert Trimmingham, noted that German prisoners could visit restaurants that they could not because of Jim Crow laws.), luxuries such as beer and wine were sometimes available, and hobbies or sports were encouraged. Alex Funke, who served as military chaplain to fellow POWs at Camp Algona, wrote: "We all were positively impressed" by the U.S. and that "We all had been won over to friendly relations with" the U.S. Indeed, unauthorized fraternization between American women and German prisoners was sometimes a problem. Several camps held social receptions with local American girls, and some Germans met their future wives as prisoners.

==== Rations ====
When I was captured I weighed 128 pounds [58 kg]. After two years as an American POW weighed 185 [84 kg]. I had gotten so fat you could no longer see my eyes.

— A German prisoner of war

Many prisoners found that their living conditions as prisoners were better than as civilians in cold water flats in Germany. All prisoners ate the same rations as American soldiers, as required by the Geneva Convention, including wine for general officers, and special meals for Thanksgiving and Christmas Day; if experienced cooks were among the prisoners, the food might have been better than what their captors ate. Unable to eat all their food, prisoners at first burned leftover food fearing that their rations would be reduced.

Groups of prisoners pooled their daily beer coupons to take turns drinking several at a time. They also received daily rations of cigarettes and frequently meat, both rationed for American civilians. (Cigarettes were sold in the prisoner canteen for less than outside the camp, so guards were sometimes amenable to being bribed with them.) One German later recalled that he gained 57 pounds (26 kg) in two years as a prisoner. Despite complaints to International Red Cross inspectors about the perceived inferiority of American white bread and coffee, prisoners recognized that they were treated better in the United States than anywhere else.

==== Entertainment and education ====
Funke stated that "Nobody could become bored [as a prisoner]." Prisoners were provided with writing materials, art supplies, woodworking utensils, and musical instruments, and were allowed regular correspondence with family in Germany. They held frequent theatrical and musical performances attended by hundreds or thousands, including American guards and Red Cross inspectors; local radio stations even broadcast their music. Prisoners had private radios, and movies were shown as often as four nights a week; if the camp did not have a projector, prisoners often pooled their savings to purchase one. The cinema served as an important reeducation and propaganda tool as well as entertainment, with Hollywood anti-Nazi films, cartoons such as "Herr Meets Hare", and the Why We Fight series used; American World War II films shown mostly dealt with the Pacific War. Near the end of the war, approved German films from a list exchanged through the Red Cross became available.

After the liberation of the Nazi concentration camps, films of the atrocities of the Holocaust were shown to the prisoners with armed Military Police present. The footage engendered shock, anger, and disbelief; amazed and disbelieving prisoners nicknamed them knochen films ("films of bones"). However, many prisoners accepted the films as factual; after compulsory viewing of an atrocity film, 1,000 prisoners at Camp Butner burned their German uniforms. Prisoners at other camps called on Germany to surrender. In an idea seriously considered but ultimately rejected by American military officials, a few prisoners even volunteered to fight in the war against Japan.

Camps built libraries to organize their reading material and prisoners often purchased their own, but they never had enough reading material, with an average of one half book per prisoner. The YMCA printed thousands of copies of books for the camps, and even provided bookbinding material so camps could repair them due to frequent use.

As a highly effective tool of reeducation after American entry into World War II, the libraries of the POW camps very often included Berman-Fischer in Stockholm's paperback editions of great works of recent German literature that remained strictly banned under censorship in Nazi Germany. Particularly in demand among POWs were Exilliteratur by anti-Nazi refugee writers such as Erich Maria Remarque's All Quiet on the Western Front, Thomas Mann's Zauberberg, and Franz Werfel's The Song of Bernadette. In an article for inter-camp journal Der Ruf, German POW Curt Vinz opined, "Had we only had the opportunity to read these books before, our introduction to life, to war, and the expanse of politics would have been different."

Camps had subscriptions to American newspapers, and every camp published its own newspaper with poetry and short stories, puzzles and games, listings of upcoming events, and classified ads. Camp authorities recognized the periodicals' value in serving as creative outlets and as accurate indicators of the prisoners' views. The tone of their articles varied; some promoted Nazi ideology and foresaw German victory. Even as Germany's defeat neared in early 1945, eight of 20 camp newspapers advocated Nazi ideology.

Many future German CEOs benefited from education they received as prisoners in the United States. Educated prisoners such as future German cabinet member Walter Hallstein taught classes on their areas of expertise including German, English and other foreign languages, business, and mathematics. The systematically taught courses were so successful that in May 1944 the German Ministry of Education and the OKW sent through the Red Cross detailed procedures for students to receive credit at German high schools and universities. Some prisoners took correspondence classes through local universities, and German universities also accepted their credits after returning home.

=== Prisoner resistance ===
Relying on Germans to discipline themselves, while efficient, also permitted committed groups of Nazi prisoners to exist despite American attempts to identify and separate them. Members of the Afrika Korps, who had been captured early in the war, during Germany's greatest military successes, often led work stoppages, intimidated other prisoners, and held secret kangaroo courts for those accused of disloyalty. Those convicted were sometimes attacked or killed in a process known as the "Holy Ghost"; most prisoner "suicides" were likely murders. The U.S. military executed 14 Germans after the war for murdering three fellow prisoners. Eight others served time in prison in two additional murders. However, dozens of such murders may have occurred. Many devoted Nazis remained loyal to their political beliefs and expected a German victory until the Allies crossed the Rhine in March 1945; their faith amazed prisoners captured during and after the Battle of Normandy, who had more realistic views of the likely outcome of the war. In turn, the earlier prisoners often viewed the others with contempt, calling them "traitors" and "deserters". Fear of secret punishment by such men caused one prisoner to later state that "there was more political freedom in the German army than in an American prison camp." He and other anti-Nazis were sent to Camp Ruston to protect them, while an Oklahoma camp received Waffen-SS and prisoners who were violent or criticized cooperation with the captors.

Prisoners regardless of ideology often taunted their captors, such as saluting with Sieg Heils when forced to attend the lowering of the United States flag. They secretly celebrated Hitler's birthday and other Nazi holidays after the Americans banned them, and many became upset when Jewish American officers supervised them. Prisoners were expected during wartime to attempt to escape, but less than 1% of all prisoners of war in America attempted to escape—about half the rate of Italian prisoners and less than the rate in the civilian prison system— and most were unsuccessful. The likelihood of an escapee returning to their forces overseas was very remote; the wish to avoid boredom was the reason most often given by those who attempted to escape, often hoping to reach Argentina. Prisoners who died during escape attempts usually received military funerals with US government-provided German flags.

On December 23, 1944, 25 German POWs broke out of Camp Papago Park in Arizona by crawling along a 178-foot (54 m) tunnel. By January the escapees were caught, in part because a river they intended to travel down by raft turned out to be a dry river bed.

=== Special Projects Division ===
The OPMG began a formal reeducation program for German prisoners in fall 1943. Named the Special Projects Division (SPD) and directed by a group of university professors, the program published der Ruf (The Call), a prison newspaper edited by sympathetic POWs, and distributed books banned in Nazi Germany. The effort was kept secret because it probably violated the Geneva Convention's ban on exposing prisoners to propaganda, the possibility of German retaliation with American prisoners, and the expectation that prisoners would reject overt reeducation. After V-E Day, SPD began a series of rapid classes on democracy for some of the most cooperative prisoners. The 25,000 graduates of these classes returned directly to Germany, instead of being used for additional labor in Europe.

SPD's efforts were unsuccessful. Many in the OPMG opposed the program, in part because they believed that changing most adults' basic philosophies and values was impossible and, if successful, might cause them to choose Communism as an alternative. The American professors were almost entirely ignorant of German language or culture, as well as military and prison life. The reading material they prepared was overly intellectual and did not appeal to most prisoners, and der Ruf was unpopular as it was essentially a literary journal with little current news. Surveys of camp prisoners found no change in the views of the vast majority of prisoners from the program. This was consistent with the unchanging level of confidence found in German soldiers immediately after their capture in Europe despite steady German defeats. Their nation's complete defeat in the war and subsequent division into two countries were likely much more influential than SPD reeducation in Germans' postwar rejection of Nazism.

=== After the war ===
The 3 years in the camp were no lost, useless time for us in the course of our lives, but a lifting experience, which has shaped us.

— Alex Funke, PoW and chaplain

Although they expected to go home immediately after the end of the war in 1945, the majority of German prisoners continued working in the United States until 1946—arguably violating the Geneva Convention's requirement of rapid repatriation—then spent up to three more years as laborers in France and the United Kingdom. (see also German prisoners of war in the United Kingdom). In May 1945 the OPMG limited available food and ended canteen food sales. Civilians had complained that the prisoners were eating too well; as the Geneva Convention no longer applied, and because of the atrocities discovered at concentration camps, prisoners' rations were cut and work loads were increased.

Before being sent home prisoners were required to watch documentaries of the Nazi concentration camps. Scholar Arnold Krammer noted that in his years of interviewing prisoners he never met one who admitted to being a Nazi, and most Germans had some knowledge of the camps; however, how much those captured in North Africa knew of the Eastern Front—where most atrocities occurred—is unclear. Funke, whom the Gestapo had considered politically unreliable before capture in North Africa because of his participation in the Confessing Church, said that while aware of Nazi persecution of Jews and the existence of concentration camps, he only learned of the extent of the Holocaust from media reports after the camps' liberation.

Despite the delay in repatriation, Krammer reported that "I've yet to meet a German prisoner who doesn't tell me that it was the time of their lives." Most Germans left the United States with positive feelings about the country where they were held, familiarity with the English language, and often with several hundred dollars in earnings. The funds benefited the postwar German economy on their return. They had benefited from being held by a nation that largely did not hate German soldiers; a November 1943 poll found that 74% of Americans solely blamed the German government, not Germans, for the war. After repatriation about 5,000 Germans emigrated to the United States, and thousands of others returned later to visit such as Rüdiger von Wechmar, who lived in New York City for 14 years as the German Permanent Representative to the United Nations. Citing 80 fellow prisoners with whom he corresponded after returning home, Funke reported that no reeducation had been necessary in the camps, because they had become "convinced democrats" due to their treatment.

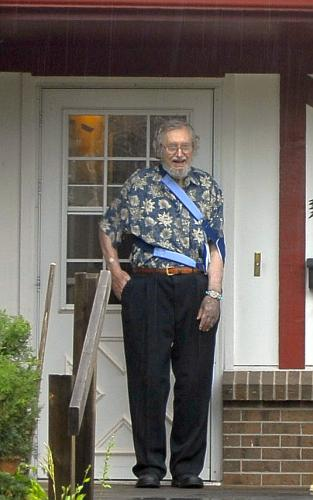
Dennis Whiles, aka Georg Gaertner (July 4, 2009)

The camps in the United States are otherwise what the Associated Press later called an "all but forgotten part of history", even though some former inmates went on to become prominent in postwar Germany. About 860 German POWs remain buried in 43 sites across the United States, with their graves often tended by local German Women's Clubs. Even in the communities which formerly hosted POW camps for Germans, local residents often do not know the camps ever existed. Reunions of camp inmates, their captors and local townspeople such as those held in Louisiana, Maine, and Georgia have garnered press coverage and local interest for this unusual and infrequently mentioned aspect of the war on the American home front.

There is at least one recorded attempt by US authorities to extract information from German POWs through torture. The camps for Germans were cited as precedents for various positions or failures of U.S. detainee policy during the debate over detainees at Guantanamo Bay Detention Camp.

A total of 2,222 German POWs escaped from their camps. Most were recaptured within a day. The US government could not account for seven prisoners when they were repatriated. Georg Gaertner, who escaped from a POW camp in Deming, New Mexico, on September 21, 1945, to avoid being repatriated to Silesia, occupied by the Soviet Union, remained at large until 1985. After the war, the other few escaped prisoners were recaptured or surrendered. After Kurt Rossmeisl—who had lived in Chicago for 14 years—surrendered, Gaertner was the only remaining escapee who had not been captured. He assumed a new identity as Dennis Whiles and lived quietly in California, Colorado, and Hawaii before coming forward in 1985. The FBI had ended its search for Gaertner in 1963 and the federal government could not prosecute or deport him. Whiles became a naturalized US citizen in 2009 and wrote a memoir, Hitler's Last Soldier in America.

== See also ==
- Barbwire Bowl Classic
- Building 98
- German prisoners of war in the United Kingdom
- German prisoners of war in the Soviet Union
- German prisoners of war in northwest Europe
- List of World War II prisoner-of-war camps in the United States
- SS United States Victory, 1946 exchanges
- Populations at World War II prisoner-of-war camps in the United States
- Prisoners of war in World War II
- United States home front during World War I
- United States home front during World War II
