= Georg Gaertner =

Escaped German POW, American citizen

Georg Gärtner
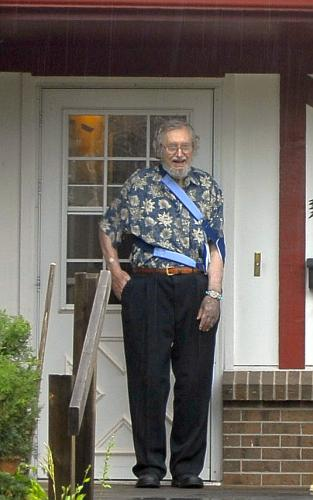
- Dennis Whiles at the age of 88 (Independence Day 2009)
- Born: Georg Gärtner; December 18, 1920; Schweidnitz, Lower Silesia, German Republic (now Świdnica, Poland)
- Died: January 30, 2013 (aged 92); Longmont, Colorado, U.S.
- Other name: Dennis F. Whiles
- Military career
- Branch: Wehrmacht
- Service years: 1940–1943
- Unit: Afrika Korps

Georg Gärtner (German pronunciation: [ˈɡeːɔʁk ˈɡɛʁtnɐ]; December 18, 1920 – January 30, 2013) was a German World War II soldier who was captured by British troops and later held as a prisoner of war by the United States. He escaped from a prisoner of war camp, took on a new identity as Dennis F. Whiles, and was never recaptured. He revealed his true identity after staying some 40 years in the United States.

== Biography ==
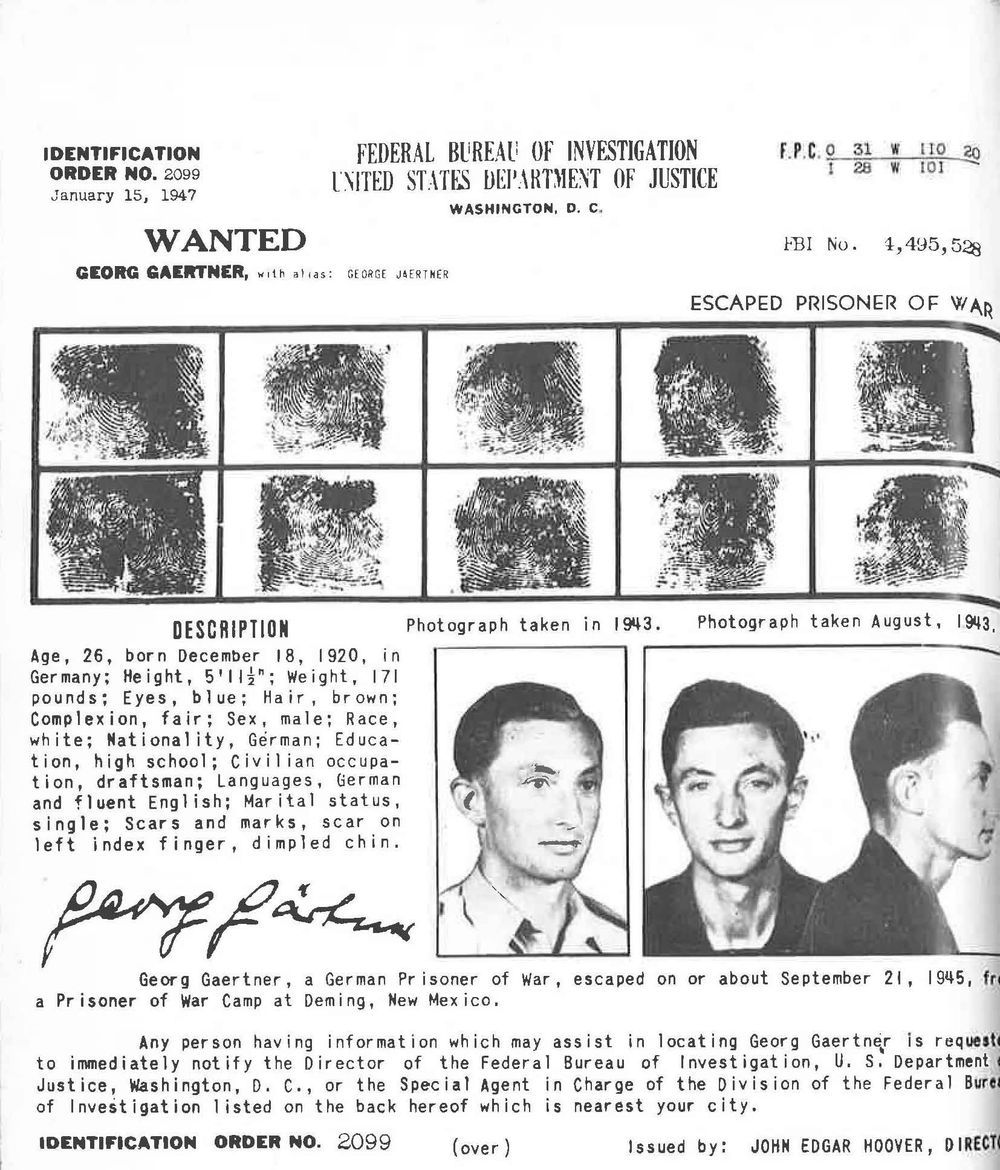
Georg Gaertner's FBI file

Gärtner was from Schweidnitz, Lower Silesia (now Świdnica, Poland). Born to Paul and Emma Gärtner, he had two siblings, Paul Jr. and Lotte. He enlisted in the Wehrmacht in 1940 at age 19, and fought in the North African campaign with the Afrika Korps. He was captured by British troops in Tunis in 1943 and was taken to the United States as a prisoner of war.

At the end of the war, Gärtner was terrified at the thought of being repatriated to his hometown, which at the time became a part of communist Poland, and decided to escape. Several weeks after the war's end, he escaped from his prison camp in Deming, New Mexico, on September 22, 1945. After crawling under two gates, he jumped aboard a passing freight train whose schedule he had calculated. The train took him to California.

Gärtner moved between various towns on the West Coast, working as a lumberjack, dishwasher, or laborer. Having studied English as an officer candidate, he perfected his command of the language, created a new identity as Dennis F. Whiles, obtained a Social Security card in that name, and invented a biography in which he had been raised in an orphanage after his parents had been killed in a traffic accident. He eventually settled in Norden, California, where he worked as a ski instructor in the winter and in construction and sales jobs during the summer. While attending a YMCA dance, he met Jean Clarke, and the couple married in 1964. He adopted her two children from a previous marriage.

After his 1945 escape the US Army launched a manhunt which lasted until 1963. The FBI issued "wanted" posters for Gärtner in 1947. According to his autobiography, he joined a ski expedition formed to rescue the City of San Francisco, a train stranded in a blizzard in the Sierra Nevada in January 1952, immediately after which Life magazine took his and the group's picture. Meanwhile, FBI wanted posters for him were in most post offices. For 40 years Gärtner was listed as one of the FBI's most wanted persons. However, since the authorities correctly surmised his reason for escaping, to avoid repatriation rather than a violent goal such as seeking revenge for Germany's defeat, he was not designated "dangerous", which would have resulted in a more intense manhunt.

Upon his arrival by train in San Pedro, California as a fugitive, Gärtner first worked in various transient jobs as a dishwasher, cook, and laborer under the guise of a Norwegian immigrant named Peter Petersen. Fearing discovery, he next moved to Fresno in the Central Valley where he worked as a migrant farm laborer. For a time, he lived and traveled with a migrant farm family from Arkansas; the father's name was Dennis Whiles. On the move again, Gärtner made his way to Northern California, and taking the name Dennis Whiles, he worked at various jobs in the construction industry, first as salesman for pre-hung doors, and then eventually as a construction estimator and architectural consultant. He also began working as a ski instructor at the Sugar Bowl in Tahoe during the winters, and as a tennis pro in the East Bay area. His connections to the construction industry allowed him and his wife to start a tennis club and tennis shop at the newly developed Aptos Country Club near Santa Cruz. After several years of running the tennis side of the country club and organizing successful tennis tournaments, there was a falling out with the Aptos management, and this led Gärtner and his wife to relocate to Hawaii. Gärtner continued his work as a construction estimator on a variety of military building projects in Hawaii while his wife worked for the state in social services. During this time, his wife became increasingly disturbed by his many excuses and refusal to discuss his past. His inability to travel outside the United States (he could not get a passport), also caused them to lead increasingly separate lives as she started traveling without him. In 1984, after she was about to leave him, he confessed his past to her. At her urging, he went public the following year. He contacted history professor Arnold Krammer, a well-known authority on the history of the 371,000 German POWs held in the United States during World War II. Together they published Hitler's Last Soldier in America (1985). He also appeared on the Today Show, where he "surrendered" to Bryant Gumbel. He effectively became the last World War II German prisoner of war in America.

During his captivity in the POW camp, Gärtner had kept in touch with his family, but after his escape, he simply convinced himself that his family had died. In reality, they had fled from his hometown to West Germany; his parents were still alive in the 1960s and kept his photo on their kitchen table in hopes that he was still alive.
