= Tarnschriften =

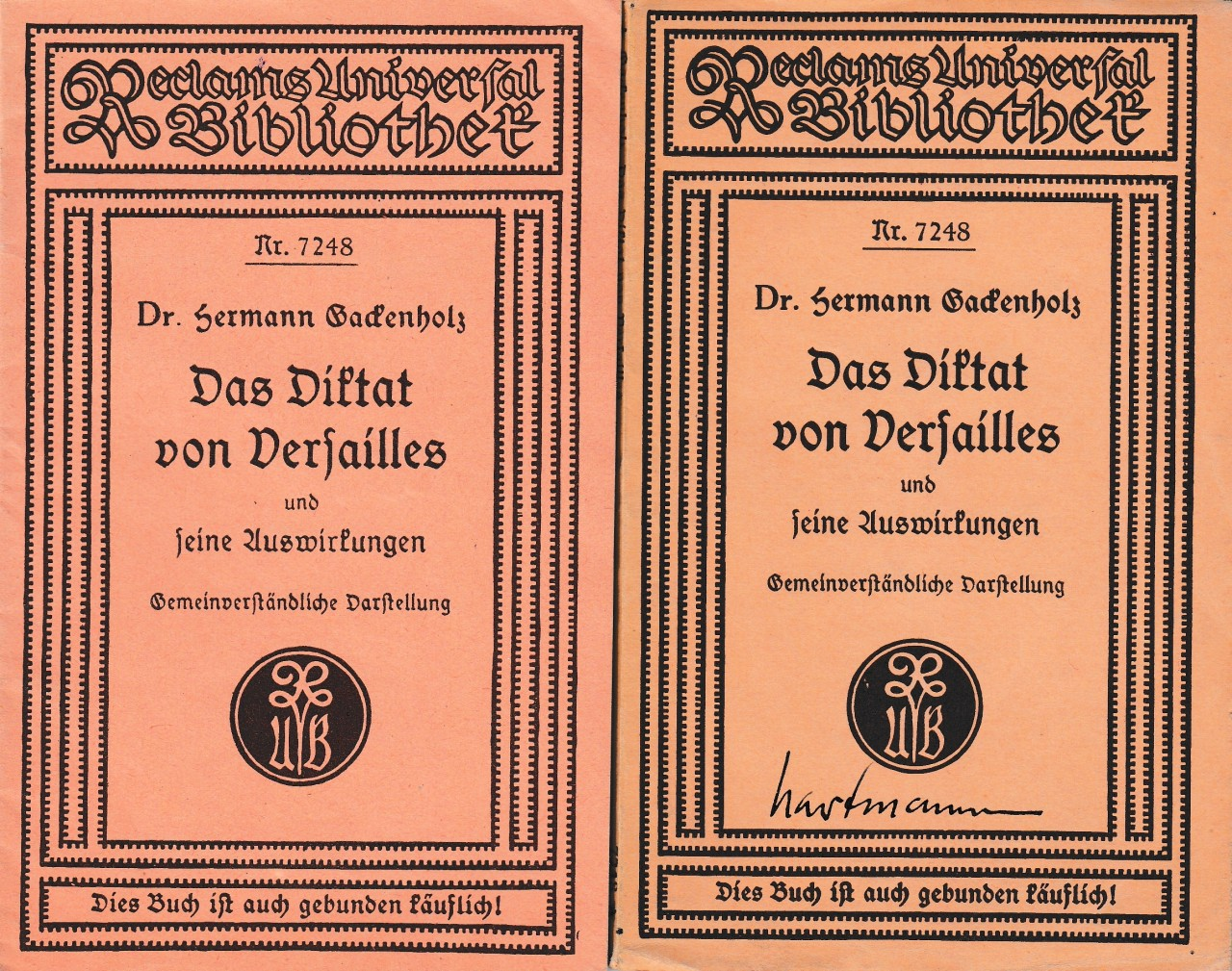
A disguised manuscript from 1935 (left), imitating a booklet from Reclam's Universal Library (right)

Tarnschriften (German: camouflaged publications) were a way to avoid censorship in Nazi Germany between 1933 and 1945. Illegal writings were given an innocent-looking cover and first and last pages. The Communist Party of Germany published about 80% of the camouflaged publications. An estimated 900–1000 publications were issued with up to 40,000 copies printed per title. Most of the publications were written for Germany, but there were also volumes for Spain and Norway, where a speech by Joseph Stalin was given the title "Hvordan kan potetene bevares mot frost" ("How to protect potatoes from frost").

== See also ==
- Underground media in German-occupied Europe
- Samizdat
