= Raymund Hörhager =

German journalist (1910–1992)

Raymund Hörhager (25 October 1910 – 26 March 1992) was a German journalist. He was foreign correspondent for well-known German newspapers in Vienna.

== Life ==
Raymund Hörhager was born on 25 October 1910 in Düsseldorf as the son of Johann and Louise Hörhager (née Laimböck), who originally came from the Zillertal (Tyrol), and attended the Hindenburg Gymnasium there. Even as a high school graduate, his career aspiration was "to be a journalist." Since the desired university study of history was not possible for financial reasons, Hörhager started as a trainee at the Vossische Zeitung in Berlin. When this was discontinued after the National Socialists seized power, Hörhager went to Belgrade as a correspondent for the Graf Reischach newspaper service. After a short training in the Navy, Hörhager was sent to North Africa as a war correspondent during the German landing in Tunisia in 1941. After the Allied counter-offensive, Hörhager was taken prisoner by the English, who handed him over to the Americans. As a journalist who was convinced of the futility of the German war effort, Hörhager was actively involved in publishing and editing the magazine for German prisoners of war (Der Ruf). In this context, the Fort Kearney special camp in Rhode Island played a central role, and Hörhager's achievement was highlighted in a letter dated 1 December 1945 from Provost Marshal General of the Army Service Forces Archer L. Lerch.

He died on 26 March 1992 in Vienna, at the age of 81.

== Career ==
After his return, Hörhager moved with his family to Vienna, where he reported on the turbulent post-war years in Austria as official foreign correspondent for the Süddeutsche Zeitung, when the country regained its independence thanks to clever negotiations by politicians such as Julius Raab and Foreign Minister Leopold Figl. Hörhager also reported from Vienna for the Norddeutscher Rundfunk. German newspapers that he represented there for many years are the Kölnische Rundschau, the Allgemeine Zeitung Mainz, the Rheinpfalz Ludwigshafen, the Südkurier in Konstanz as well as the St. Galler Tagblatt and the Luxemburger Wort. His reporting covered the entire Southeast European region. He witnessed the Hungarian uprising of 1956 in Budapest, the Prague Spring of 1968 in what was then CSSR, as well as the numerous reform efforts and finally the disintegration of Yugoslavia.

Among his publications is a tourist guide to former Czechoslovakia.

== Honours ==
Hörhager was awarded the Federal Cross of Merit, First Class, of the Federal Republic of Germany (1981) and the Gold Medal of Merit of the Republic of Austria. He was doyen and honorary member of the Foreign Press Association in Vienna.
