= Censorship in Nazi Germany =

Censorship in Nazi Germany was strictly enforced by the governing Nazi Party, but specifically by Joseph Goebbels and his Reich Ministry of Public Enlightenment and Propaganda. Similarly to many other police states both before and since, censorship within Nazi Germany included the silencing of all past and present dissenting voices. In addition to the further propaganda weaponization of all forms of mass communication, including newspaper, music, literature, radio, and film, by the State, the Ministry of Propaganda also produced and disseminated their own literature, which was solely devoted to spreading Nazi ideology and the Hitler Myth.

As many other Orwellian political parties have done both before and since, the Nazis set out in many other ways to completely rewrite German history and the history of German literature to conform to Nazi ideology and condemned everything that contradicted their fictitious claims to "the memory hole" of historical negationism. They were harshly criticized for this at the time by figures including Clemens von Galen, Sigrid Undset, Dietrich von Hildebrand, J.R.R. Tolkien, and Jorge Luis Borges.

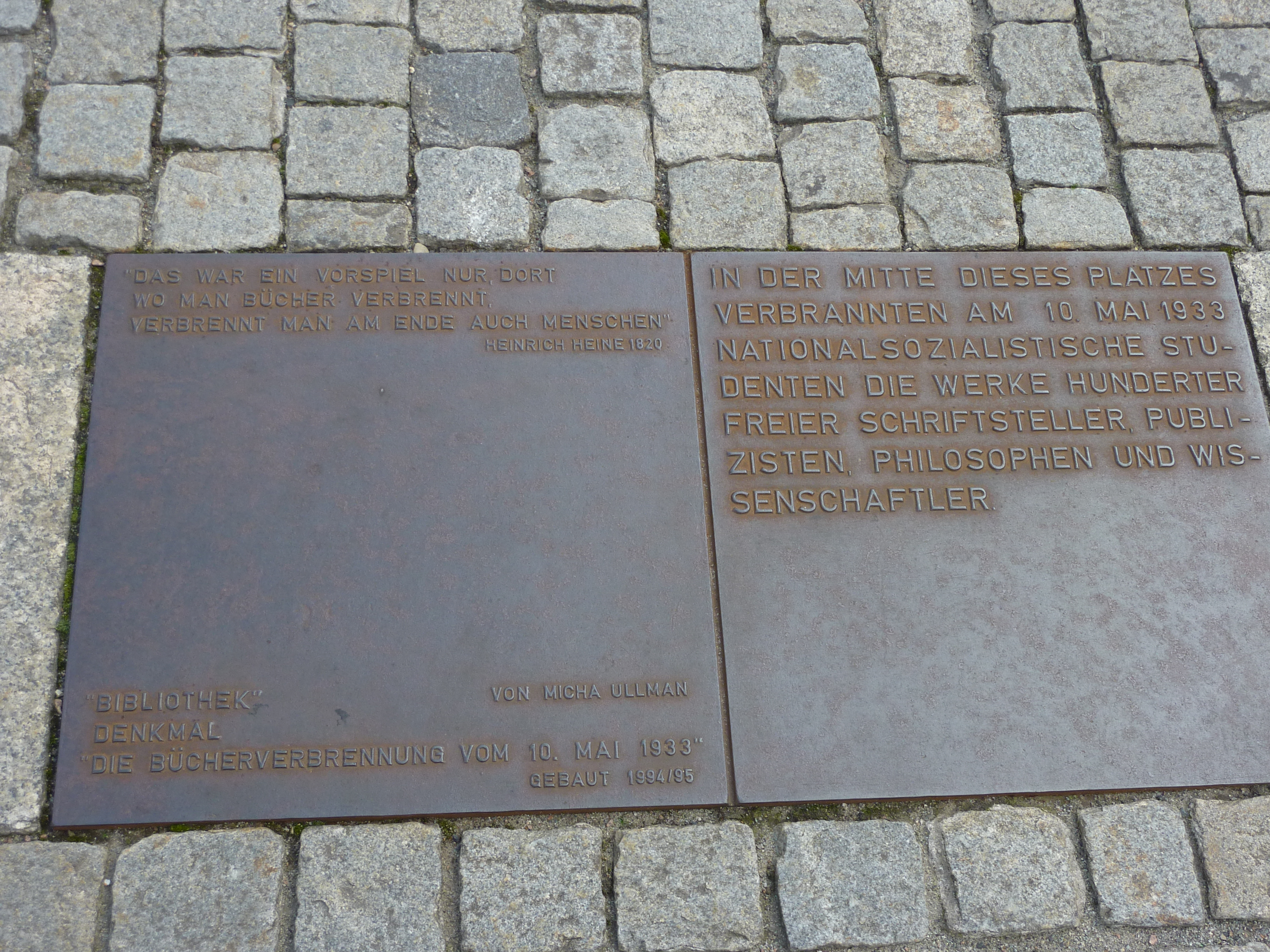
Plaque at Bebelplaz commemorating Nazi book burning, 10 May 1933

Among the thousands of books burned on Berlin's Opernplatz in 1933, following the Nazi raid on the Institut für Sexualwissenschaft, were works by one of the most iconic individuals ever to write in the German language, the German Jewish Romantic poet Heinrich Heine (1797–1856). To both memorialize and criticize Nazi ideological censorship, the oft-quoted and eerily prophetic lines from Heine's 1821 stage play Almansor, were put in a plaque at the site: (German: "Das war ein Vorspiel nur, dort wo man Bücher verbrennt, verbrennt man auch am Ende Menschen.") ("That was but a prelude; where they burn books, they will ultimately burn people as well.")

Even though the German people are traditionally stereotyped as blindly obedient to authority, excessive government censorship stirred up the same backlash commonly seen in many other countries. Despite the extremely high risks involved, public demand created a black market for banned literature, which continued to be published throughout the global German diaspora by Exilliteratur firms, and especially for allegedly "degenerate" American Jazz and Swing Music, which were acquired anyway and devoured in secret by the early beginnings of an anti-Nazi youth dissident movement.

Moreover, Nazi ideological censorship triggered a brain drain that proved devastating to Germany and Austria's once dynamic literary, artistic, and cultural life and to the German film industry. Many cities throughout the world became population centers of anti-Nazi German and Austrian refugees, including many poets, writers, scientists, and intellectuals who had fled to maintain their freedom of expression. Many of Germany and Austria's popular actors, directors, and film technicians, including Fritz Lang, Max Reinhardt, William Dieterle, Fred Zinnemann, Conrad Veidt, Marlene Dietrich, Hedy Lamarr, Peter Lorre, and many others like them often emigrated for very similar reasons and continued their careers by aiding the Allied war effort as anti-Nazi filmmakers in Hollywood. It caused even greater amount of damage to Austria and Germany's intellectual, literary, and cultural life that, despite the eventual end of Nazi Party rule in 1945, most of these refugees never returned.

Even so, many Allied policy makers and propagandists took the claims of Goebbels Ministry about German history and culture at face value, particularly following the outbreak of World War II. This lack of insight led to both widespread Anti-German sentiment and calls by influential figures like Ilya Ehrenberg, Edvard Beneš, Theodore N. Kaufman, and Abba Kovner, for total war tactics and even for ethnic cleansing and genocide against the German people following the end of the war, which were far more widely carried out in the postwar Soviet Bloc, than in what became West Germany.

In actual practice, giving German POWs easy access to banned art, music, motion pictures, and literary works was found in the United States to be a very effective tool of deprogramming them from Nazi ideology. For this reason, several former POWs held in the United States went on to highly influential positions in the literary and cultural life of the Federal Republic of Germany, where the Marshall Plan, instead of a second Versailles Treaty or the even more vengeful Morgenthau Plan, helped set the stage for the West German economic miracle. Also following the end of Nazi Party rule in 1945, the deliberate falsification of history, art, literature, and current events by the Ministry of Propaganda were satirized as the ironically named Ministry of Truth in George Orwell's classic dystopian novel Nineteen Eighty-Four.

Ever since it opened in 1980, the Memorial to the German Resistance in Berlin has included exhibits about Nazi propaganda, censorship, and those, like The White Rose student movement, who defied them at extremely high risk and often with terrible costs.

== The Black List ==
All innovation in art starting with Impressionism, especially Cubism and Expressionism, were ruled degenerate art and banned by the Ministry. All works by composers of popular or Classical music with Jewish ancestry like Mendelssohn, Mahler, and Schoenberg were banned as degenerate music.

In a particularly egregious example, the Ministry banned and blacklisted legendary avante garde stage director Max Reinhardt, whom Toby Cole and Helen Krich Chinoy have dubbed "one of the most picturesque actor-directors of modern times". Reinhardt, whose Max Reinhardt Seminar acting school was later refounded in post-World War II Vienna, eventually fled to the United States as a refugee from the imminent Nazi takeover of Austria. His arrival in America had followed a long and distinguished career, "inspired by the example of social participation in the ancient Greek and Medieval theatres", of seeking "to bridge the separation between actors and audiences".

When Reinhardt's brief Hollywood career resulted in his acclaimed 1935 film adaptation of William Shakespeare's A Midsummer Night's Dream, the film was banned from German theatres by the Ministry, as well. This was due not only to Joseph Goebbels' belief that Reinhardt's filmmaking style, which drew heavily upon the pre-1933 tradition of German expressionist cinema, was degenerate art, but even more so due to the Jewish ancestry of Reinhardt, Classical music composer Felix Mendelssohn, and soundtrack arranger Erich Wolfgang Korngold.

Amongst those authors and artists who were suppressed both during the Nazi book burnings and the attempt to destroy modernist fine art in the "degenerate" art exhibition were:

- Bertolt Brecht
- Heinrich Heine
- Ernest Hemingway
- Thomas Mann
- John Dos Passos
- Dietrich von Hildebrand
- H. G. Wells

Artists banned include:

- Elfriede Lohse-Wächtler
- Pablo Picasso
- Claude Monet
- Vincent van Gogh

Composers banned include:

- Erich Wolfgang Korngold
- Gustav Mahler
- Felix Mendelssohn
- Arnold Schoenberg

Dramatists and filmmakers banned include:

- William Dieterle
- Friedrich Forster
- Hugo von Hofmannsthal
- Fritz Lang
- Max Reinhardt

Philosophers, scientists, and sociologists suppressed by Nazi Germany include:

- Albert Einstein
- Niels Bohr
- Friedrich Engels
- Sigmund Freud
- Dietrich von Hildebrand
- Magnus Hirschfeld
- Edmund Husserl
- Karl Marx
- Max Scheler

Politicians suppressed by Nazi Germany include:

- Konrad Adenauer
- Karl Goerdeler
- Theodor Heuss

== Criticism and opposition ==
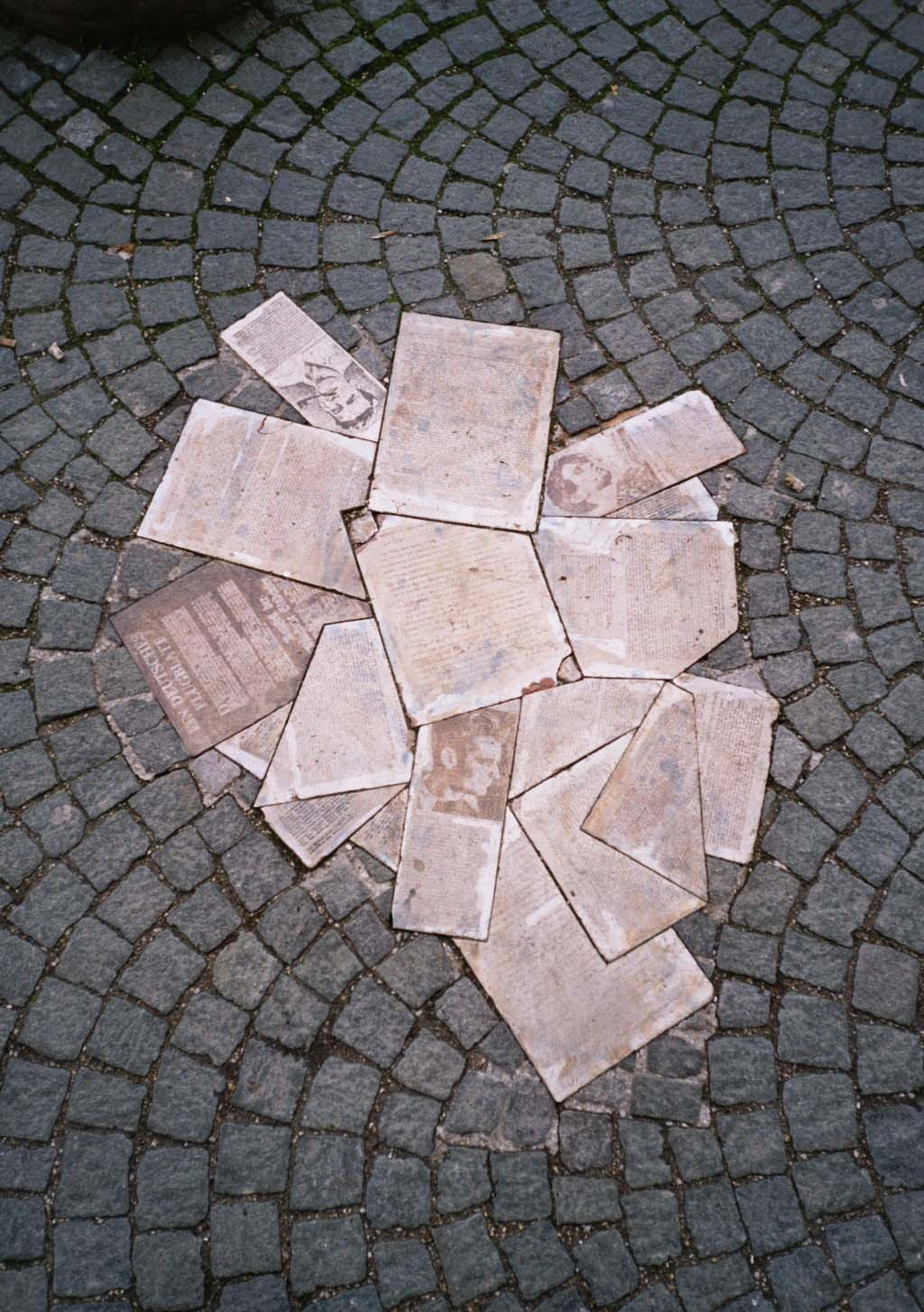
Monument to the "Weiße Rose" in front of LMU Munich

Even though the German people are traditionally stereotyped as blindly obedient to authority, it should not be pretended that Nazi censorship was left unchallenged.

Between 1933 and 1939, large numbers of German-speakers fled into exile. These included many dissident writers, poets, and artists. Many refugees had Jewish ancestry, but there were also large numbers of "Aryans", too, who held anti-Nazi religious or political beliefs.

Population centers of anti-Nazi émigrés who continued to speak and write in the German language and the Exilliteratur publishing firms catering to their readers swiftly emerged in several European cities, including Paris, Amsterdam, Stockholm, Zürich, London, Prague, Moscow as well as across the Atlantic in New York City, Chicago, Los Angeles, Mexico City, and many other cities. Well known for their publications were the publishers Querido Verlag and Verlag Allert de Lange in Amsterdam, Berman-Fischer Verlag in Stockholm, and Oprecht in Zürich.

Like anti-communist Russian poets, writers, and publishing houses in Prague, Berlin, Paris, London, and New York after the October Revolution, anti-Nazi German poets and writers saw themselves as the continuation of an older and better Germany, which had been taken over and perverted by the Nazi Party. A particularly effective example was Rudolf Roessler's Vita Nova Verlag, based in Lucerne, Switzerland, which published anti-Nazi German writers, anti-communist Russian writers, and anti-Franco Spanish writers. Vita Nova also commissioned and published translations into the German language of Christian literature by writers from multiple denominations, but all of whom had been banned by Goebbels' Ministry, such as Nikolai Berdyaev, William Ralph Inge, Emanuel Rádl, Emmanuel Mounier, and Sigrid Undset.

With this in mind, they supplied the German diaspora with both banned literary works and with Alternative media critical of the regime, and, in defiance of Nazi censorship laws, their books, newspapers, and magazines were smuggled into the homeland and both read and distributed in secret by the German people.

Similarly, Jazz and Swing music, due to the vitally important role played by African American and Jewish American musicians in creating and performing both genres, were banned as Negermusik, but remained very popular among the Swingjugend counterculture anyway and were always in very high demand on Nazi Germany's thriving black market.

Furthermore, before he was sent back to the Wehrmacht in disgrace, conscripted Catholic seminarian Gereon Goldmann used his Waffen-SS uniform as a cover for both black marketeering and the deliberate subversion of Nazi anti-Catholicism and ideological censorship. He secretly purchased large numbers of strictly illegal German-language Catholic books from second-hand bookshops in occupied France. Goldmann and several other conscripted seminarians then smuggled these same books back into Nazi Germany in boxes stamped TOP SECRET: SS MAIL. Some fellow SS men assisted out of sympathy, others because they were bribed.

Goldmann later wrote, "The drivers knew their contents and consented, for money, to watch over them and deliver them to our Monastery in Gorheim-Sigmaringen, to Dr. Heinrich Hofler, the leader of the German Catholic group who ministered to the spiritual needs of the army. It was very difficult and dangerous, of course, but so rewarding. Sometimes we even when so far to send them by plane! The men helping were soldiers of the SS; I was in the SS. The drivers we bribed were Nazis, soldiers of the Reich. And yet, no one ever betrayed us. No traitor ever rose up from the ranks to reveal our activities.... Reports came back to us about how our religious superiors had succeeded in receiving the material and distributing it to the spiritually hungry Christians... We knew by this that the angels were truly on our side; and though it went somewhat against the grain to conspire against our own country, we felt that the sooner these despised men were defeated, the sooner we could return our Fatherland to her rightful rulers – the people – and her rightful King – Christ."

The written anti-Nazi sermons of Bishop Clemens August Graf von Galen and the papal encyclical Mit brennender Sorge were secretly copied and distributed in Nazi Germany at equally serious risk and ultimately inspired The White Rose student dissident movement to act similarly.

To evade being correctly identified during Gestapo raids, Exilliteratur and underground media sources often produced black market editions of banned books which were bound within innocent-looking covers with deliberately misleading titles. These illegal books were termed Tarnschriften.

In his 1938 essay "A Disturbing Exposition", Argentine author and anti-Nazi Germanophile Jorge Luis Borges had harsh words for how Johannes Rohr, in the service of the Ministry of Propaganda, had, "revised, rewritten, and Germanized the very Germanic Geschichte der deutschen National-Literatur [History of German Literature] by A.F.C. Vilmar. In editions previous to the Third Reich, Vilmar's book was decidedly mediocre; now it is alarming". Borges proceeded to harshly critique how, in this new edition of Vilmar's book and in many other books like it, everyone and everything in German history, literature, and culture which in any way contradicted Nazi ideology was either subjected to damnatio memoriae or carefully rewritten to conform. After listing many of the greatest writers in the German language who were no longer even mentioned in the new edition, an enraged Borges concluded:

As if that were not enough, Goethe, Lessing, and Nietzsche have been distorted and mutilated. Fichte and Hegel appear, but there is no mention of Schopenhauer. Of Stefan George we are informed only of a lively preamble that advantageously prefigures Adolf Hitler. Things are worse in Russia, I hear people say. I infinitely agree, but Russia does not interest us as much as Germany. Germany – along with France, England, and the United States – is one of the essential nations of the western world. Hence we feel devastated by its chaotic descent into darkness, hence the symptomatic seriousness of books like this. I find it normal for the Germans to reject the Treaty of Versailles. (There is no good European who does not detest that ruthless contrivance.) I find it normal to detest the Republic, an opportunistic (and servile) scheme to appease Wilson. I find it normal to support with fervor a man who promises to defend their honor. I find it insane to sacrifice to that honor their culture, their past, and their honesty, and to perfect the criminal arts of barbarians.

As a philologist which a specialty in Germanic languages, their mythology, and early Christian literature, such as the Heliand and The Dream of the Rood, J.R.R. Tolkien was equally as disgusted as Borges was by the Propaganda Ministry's claims that the German people had always believed in Germanic paganism and Nazi ideology. In a 1941 letter to his son Michael Tolkien, who was attending the Royal Military Academy, Sandhurst, an incensed Tolkien wrote, "I have spent most of my life, since I was your age, studying Germanic matters (in the general sense that includes England and Scandinavia). There is a great deal more force (and truth) than ignorant people imagine in the Germanic ideal. I was very much attracted by it as an undergraduate (when Hitler was, I suppose, dabbling in paint, and had not heard of it), in reaction against the Classics. You have to understand the good in things, to detect the real evil. But no one ever calls on me, [unlike C.S. Lewis] to broadcast or do a PostScript! Yet, I suppose I know more than most what is the truth about this Nordic nonsense. Anyway, I have in this war a burning, private grudge... against that ruddy little ignoramus Adolf Hitler [for] ruining, perverting, misapplying, and making forever accursed, that noble northern spirit, a supreme contribution to Europe, which I have ever loved, and tried to present in its true light. Nowhere, incidentally, was it nobler than in England, nor more early sanctified and Christianized."

For this reason, Tolkien reacted with anger to Allied politicians and propagandists during World War II, whom he felt foolishly accepted Nazi claims about German history and culture at face value. Particularly anti-German propagandists and policy-makers who accordingly called for the complete destruction of the German people after the war horrified Tolkien just as much as Nazi ideology. In a 1944 letter to his son Christopher, he wrote:

...it is distressing to see the [British] press grovelling in the gutter as low as Goebbels in his prime, shrieking that any German commander who holds out in a desperate situation (when, too, the military needs of his side clearly benefit) is a drunkard, and a besotted fanatic. ... There was a solemn article in the local [Oxford] paper seriously advocating systematic exterminating of the entire German nation as the only proper course after military victory: because, if you please, they are rattlesnakes, and don't know the difference between good and evil! (What of the writer?) The Germans have just as much right to declare the Poles and Jews exterminable vermin, subhuman, as we have to select the Germans: in other words, no right, whatever they have done.

== Legacy ==
In a highly effective tool of deprogramming German POWs from Nazi ideology, as demanded by U.S. First Lady Eleanor Roosevelt after American entry into World War II, the lending libraries of POW camps in the United States were stocked with Berman-Fischer in Stockholm's cheap paperback editions of the great works of German literature that remained strictly illegal to acquire on the black market or be caught reading in Nazi Germany. Particularly in demand among POWs were works of Exilliteratur and other books by writers subjected to historical negationism such as Erich Maria Remarque's All Quiet on the Western Front, Thomas Mann's Zauberberg, and Franz Werfel's The Song of Bernadette. In an article for the anti-Nazi POW literary journal Der Ruf, which represented a new beginning for German literature after more than a decade of strangulation by Government censorship, POW literary critic Curt Vinz opined, "Had we only had the opportunity to read these books before, our introduction to life, to war, and the expanse of politics would have been different."

After the repatriation of German POWs following the end of the Second World War, two former writers for Der Ruf, Alfred Andersch and Hans Werner Richter, first revived the journal in the American Zone of occupied Germany and then helped found the hugely influential Group 47 literary movement in what became West Germany.

Furthermore, ever since its opening in 1980, the Memorial to the German Resistance in Berlin has included museum exhibits showing illegal Tarnschriften and anti-Nazi Samizdat literature, which were written and distributed by groups like the White Rose student movement in high risk defiance of Nazi censorship laws.

Even though censorship in the Federal Republic of Germany still continues, U.S. President John F. Kennedy praised the Federal Republic of Germany on 25 June 1963 for having carefully studied and learned what he considered the morally correct lessons from both the best and worst chapters of German history, and how this understanding was still being used to build a future for post-war Germany with a democratically elected government and membership in the NATO military alliance.

== In popular culture ==
- The ironically named Ministry of Truth in George Orwell's 1949 dystopian novel Nineteen Eighty-Four is simultaneously a satire of the Nazi Propaganda Ministry under Joseph Goebbels and of the disturbingly similar State-controlled propaganda and censorship in the Soviet Union at the height of Stalinism. This is particularly true in the following quote, "Every record has been destroyed or falsified, every book rewritten, every picture has been repainted, every statue and street building has been renamed, every date has been altered. And the process is continuing day by day and minute by minute. History has stopped. Nothing exists except an endless present in which the Party is always right."
- In Robert Harris' 1992 alternate history novel Fatherland, which is set in a dystopian 1964 Berlin which is still under Nazi rule, there are multiple references to the continuing censorship of literature, music, and the arts. There are also references to how The White Rose and the Swingjugend have exploded into a widespread dissident movement among Nazi Germany's youth, who, similarly to the Sixtiers generation of Soviet dissidents and the Sestigers writers in Afrikaans in South Africa under apartheid, illegally listen to banned American radio stations, raise unwelcome questions about Nazi ideology, love jazz and rock and roll, and read and circulate crudely printed samizdat copies of banned books. It is further mentioned in the novel that particularly popular banned writers among the youth dissident movement are Graham Greene, George Orwell, J.D. Salinger and Günter Grass.
- The 1993 film Swing Kids, set in 1938 Hamburg and starring Robert Sean Leonard, Christian Bale, and Kenneth Branagh, depicts the Swingjugend youth counterculture and their enthusiasm, in defiance of both Government censorship and an ultimate police state crackdown, for allegedly degenerate American Jazz and Swing music.
- The 2005 German language film Sophie Scholl – The Final Days, depicts the show trials the Nazi-controlled legal system used against dissident intellectuals like the White Rose student movement, who non-violently resisted government censorship laws by writing and distributing leaflets critical of Adolf Hitler and Nazi ideology. The film stars Julia Jentsch as Sophie Scholl, Alexander Held as Gestapo interrogator Robert Mohr, and André Hennicke as Volksgerichtshof Judge Roland Freisler.

== See also ==
- Censorship in Germany
- Nazi propaganda
- Degenerate art
- Degenerate music
- List of authors banned in Nazi Germany
- Underground media in German-occupied Europe

== Sources ==
- Carpenter, Humphrey, ed. (2023) [1981]. The Letters of J. R. R. Tolkien: Revised and Expanded Edition. New York: HarperCollins. ISBN 978-0-35-865298-4.
