= Egbert White =

American journalist

- Born: 1894; Kansas City, Missouri, United States
- Died: January 1976 (aged 81); Hartford, Connecticut, United States
- Occupation: Journalist
- Known for: Founder of Yank, the Army Weekly
- Awards: Silver Star, Purple Heart, Legion of Merit

Egbert White (1894 – January 1976) was an American journalist, whom during the Second World War had a major role in establishing newspapers for US infantry that were written and edited by enlisted men, as opposed to the general staff facilitated under the Stars and Stripes. He founded Yank, the Army Weekly in 1942, famous for being the origin of G.I Joe.

== Biography ==
Born in Kansas City, Missouri, he had served with the Stars and Stripes during the First World War and worked in advertising during the interwar era.

Within a month after Pearl Harbor, he proposed a magazine by soldiers for soldiers to General Frederick Osborn. This proposal was accepted, and became Yank magazine, in which he collaborator with Adolph Ochs and Robert Fuoss of The Saturday Evening Post and Alfred Strasser from Liberty. He accepted a commission as lieutenant colonel.

White was removed from the Yank staff in 1942 by General Osborn and was ordered overseas to serve with the Stars and Stripes newspaper. He was in charge of the North African/Mediterranean edition of Stars and Stripes from its beginning in December 1942 to mid 1944. He insisted that this newspaper too should be for the enlisted men not the high command. Bill Mauldin began drawing cartoons for the Stars and Stripes while White was in charge of it. White encouraged Mauldin to accept offers to syndicate his cartoons to US newspapers, and helped Mauldin find a literary agent.

In mid 1944, he was sent home because he wanted to run excerpts from US newspapers about the 1944 Presidential campaign in Stars and Stripes, and the army command forbade this.

He died in January 1976 in Hartford, Connecticut aged 81.
