= Populations at World War II prisoner-of-war camps in the United States =

List of prisoners of war in US during WW2

The following lists prisoner of war populations in the continental United States during World War II.

US Prisoner of War populations
Month	Total POWs	German	Italian	Japanese
May 1942	32	31	-	1
June 1942	33	32	-	1
July 1942	49	39	-	10
August 1942	65	55	-	10
September 1942	177	130	-	47
October 1942	183	130	-	53
November 1942	431	380	-	51
December 1942	1,881	512	1,317	52
January 1943	2,365	990	1,313	62
February 1943	2,444	1,026	1,356	62
March 1943	2,755	1,334	1,359	62
April 1943	5,007	2,146	2,799	62
April 1943	5,007	2,146	2,799	62
May 1943	36,083	22,110	13,911	62
June 1943	53,435	34,161	19,212	62
July 1943	80,558	54,502	25,969	87
August 1943	130,299	94,220	35,986	93
September 1943	163,706	115,358	48,253	95
October 1943	167,748	119,401	48,252	95
November 1943	171,484	122,350	49,039	95
December 1943	172,879	123,440	49,323	116
January 1944	174,822	124,880	49,826	116
February 1944	177,387	127,252	49,993	142
March 1944	183,618	133,135	50,136	347
April 1944	184,502	133,967	50,168	367
May 1944	186,368	135,796	50,164	408
June 1944	196,948	146,101	50,278	569
July 1944	224,863	173,980	50,276	607
August 1944	243,870	192,868	50,272	730
September 1944	300,382	248,205	51,034	1,143
October 1944 (Note: The total in this month is 37,000 higher than the individual counts. The numbers do not match in the source. It's likely the German counts are incorrect.)	338,055	248,781	51,032	1,242
November 1944	360,455	306,856	51,156	2,443
December 1944	360,281	306,581	51,071	2,629
January 1945	359,687	306,306	50,561	2,820
February 1945	360,996	307,404	50,571	3,021
March 1945	365,954	312,144	50,550	3,260
April 1945	399,518	345,920	50,304	3,294
May 1945	425,871	371,683	50,273	3,915
June 1945	425,806	371,505	50,052	4,249
July 1945	422,130	367,513	49,789	4,828
August 1945	415,919	361,322	49,184	5,413
September 1945	403,311	355,458	42,915	4,938
October 1945	391,145	351,150	35,065	4,930
November 1945	358,419	324,623	29,539	4,257
December 1945	341,016	313,234	25,696	2,086
January 1946	286,611	275,078	11,532	1
February 1946	208,965	208,403	561	1
March 1946	140,606	140,572	33	1
April 1946	84,209	84,177	31	1
May 1946	37,491	37,460	30	1
June 1946	162	141	20	1
