= Rupert Trimmingham =

U.S. Army Corps of Engineers corporal (1899–1985)

Rupert S. Trimmingham
- Born: August 17, 1899; Port of Spain, Trinidad
- Died: May 9, 1985 (aged 85); Ann Arbor, Michigan, U.S.
- Burial place: Fairview Cemetery; Ann Arbor, Michigan, U.S.
- Military career
- Allegiance: United States of America
- Branch: United States Army Corps of Engineers
- Service years: 1942–46
- Rank: Corporal

Rupert Stanley Trimmingham (August 17, 1899 – May 9, 1985) was a corporal in the United States Army Corps of Engineers during World War II who is noted for writing a letter that was published in Yank, the Army Weekly that attracted wide attention to the plight of black American soldiers in World War II. It was an early step in the process that, along with other publicized outrages involving black American soldiers, eventually resulted in President Harry S. Truman issuing Executive Order 9981, which desegregated the United States armed forces. Beginning within months of publication, the letter has been an inspiration for literature and the performing arts highlighting racial inequality.

== Life ==
Trimmingham was born in Port of Spain, Trinidad, the son of Harris and Lillian Trimmingham. In 1917 he emigrated to Wales, where he was a merchant seaman from 1918 to 1921. He emigrated to the United States, sailing from Southampton, England, and arriving in New York on 13 October 1925. In 1928 he married and lived in Newark, New Jersey. On 23 August 1943 he married his second wife, Harriet B. Lawsen, in Pima County, Arizona. He joined the U.S. Army Corps of Engineers in 1942, working as an electrician. After his discharge in 1946 he lived in Gary, Indiana, working for the Singer Sewing Machine Company as an electrician. He became a naturalized U. S. citizen in 1950. In 1956 he moved to Ann Arbor, Michigan, where he died in 1985 and was buried in Fairview Cemetery, Ann Arbor. His wife died in 2005 and is buried beside him.

== Incident and letter to Yank ==
In April 1944 Trimmingham and eight fellow black soldiers were traveling by train from Camp Claiborne in central Louisiana to the military hospital at Fort Huachuca, Arizona, when the train made a one-day layover in a small Louisiana town. Trimmingham wrote a letter recounting what happened that was published in the 28 April 1944 edition of Yank Magazine:

=== Trimmingham's first letter to Yank ===
April 28, 1944

Dear Yank,

Here is a question that each Negro soldier is asking. What is the Negro soldier fighting for? On whose team are we playing? Myself and eight other soldiers were on our way from Camp Claiborne, La., to the hospital here at Fort Huachuca. We had to lay over until the next day for our train. On the next day we could not purchase a cup of coffee at any of the lunchrooms around there. As you know, Old Man Jim Crow rules. The only place where we could be served was at the lunchroom at the railroad station but, of course we had to go into the kitchen. But that's not all; 11:30 a.m. about a two dozen German prisoners of war, with two American guards, came into the station. They entered the lunchroom, sat at the tables, had their meals served, talked, smoked, in fact had quite a swell time. I stood on the outside looking on, and I could not help but ask myself these questions: Are these men sworn enemies of this country? Are they not taught to hate and destroy all democratic governments? Are we not American soldiers, sworn to fight for and die if need be for this country? Then why are they treated better than we are? Why are we pushed around like cattle? If we are fighting for the same thing, if we are to die for our country, then why does the Government allow such things to go on? Some of the boys are saying that you will not print this letter. I'm saying that you will.

Cpl. Rupert Trimmingham

Fort Huachuca, Ariz.

== Reaction and subsequent letter to Yank ==
The reaction to the letter was strong and immediate. In a follow-up letter published 28 July 1944, Trimmingham said that he had received 287 letters, 183 from whites, supporting his position. The editors reported that Yank had received "a great number of comments from GIs, almost all of whom were outraged by the treatment given the corporal."

=== Trimmingham's second letter to Yank ===
July 28, 1944

Dear Yank,

Allow me to thank you for publishing my letter. Although there was some doubt about its being published, yet somehow I felt that Yank was too great a paper not to. ... Each day brings three, four or five letters to me in answer to my letter. I just returned from furlough and found 25 letters awaiting me. To date I've received 287 letters, and, strange as it may seem, 183 are from white men and women in the armed service. Another strange feature about these letters is that most of these people are from the Deep South. They are all proud of the fact that they are of the South but ashamed to learn that there are so many of their own people who by their actions and manner toward the Negro are playing Hitler's game. Nevertheless, it gives me new hope to realize that there are doubtless thousands of whites who are willing to fight this Frankenstein that so many white people are keeping alive. All that the Negro is asking for is to be given half a chance and he will soon demonstrate his worth to his country. Should these white people who realize that the Negro is a man who is loyal – one who would gladly give his life for this our wonderful country – would stand up, join with us and help us to prove to their white friends that we are worthy, I'm sure that we would bury race hate and unfair treatment. Thanks again.

Cpl. Rupert Trimmingham

Fort Huachuca, Ariz.

== Influence on popular culture ==
A short story by Robert E. McLaughlin based upon the events described by Trimmingham, "A Short Wait between Trains," was published in the 14 June 1944 New Yorker magazine. It was later republished in 1945 in a collection of McLaughlin's wartime stories, in 1949 in a collection of New Yorker short stories reprinted three times, and in 1991 in an anthology of war stories.

Also in 1945, radio writer Ruth Moore wrote a one-act play incorporating elements from Trimminghim's account and McLaughlin's story, "Short Wait between Trains", for the Chicago branch of the Stage for Action, a social activist theater organization of the 1940s and early 1950s. The play had its premiere on 28 October 1945 at the opening of the troupe's 1945–46 season at Northwestern University. The play was restaged in Chicago in March 1957 by the Universal Actors troupe as part of the United Nations' International Theatre Month.

A 25-minute film, A Short Wait between Trains, produced by Cherryl S. Espinoza and directed by Rick Wilkinson, premiered on Showtime on 15 February 1999 as an episode of the Black Filmmakers Showcase.

The PBS history series American Experience featured Courtney B. Vance reading Cpl. Trimmingham's Yank letter as part of its presentation "War Letters", first broadcast 11 November 2001.

== See also ==
- Isaac Woodard, Jr.
- Harry T. Moore
- Philleo Nash
- The Scottsboro Boys
- Ossian Sweet
- Emmett Till
- Booker T. Spicely
