= Der Ruf (newspaper) =

WWII-era antifascist periodical for German POWs

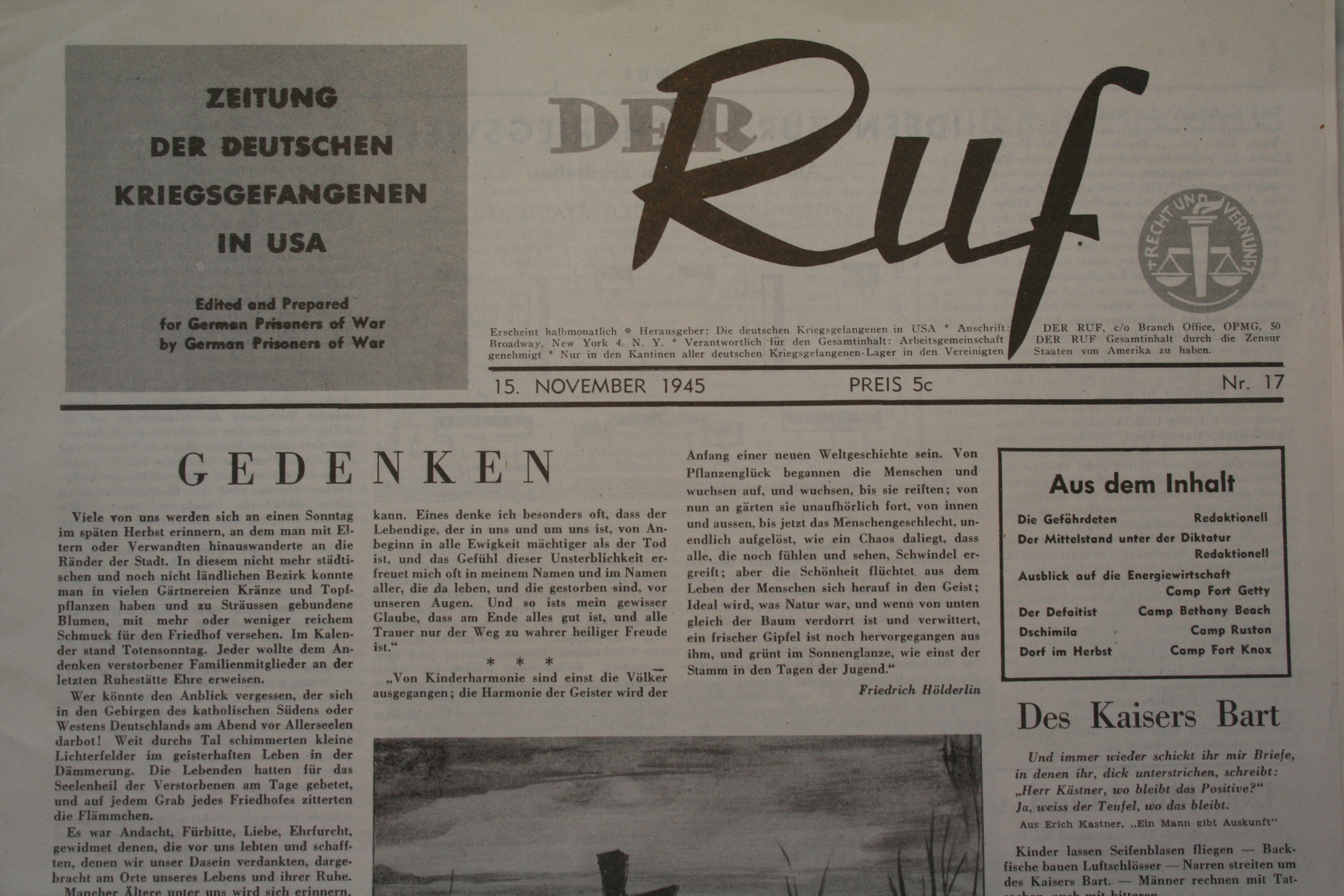
- A scan of the front page of the November 15, 1945 edition of the POW paper Der Ruf
- Type: Monthly newspaper
- Founded: March 1, 1945
- Ceased publication: March 15, 1949
- Language: German

Der Ruf or The Call was a German language newspaper published in Fort Kearny in Narragansett, Rhode Island during World War II by captured prisoners of war (POWs). It was distributed to about 140 other POW camps in the United States. At the time, Fort Kearny was the headquarters of a secret campaign to deprogram German POWs from Nazi ideology and instill democratic ideas, in the hopes that on their return to Germany they would influence the democratization of the country.

According to historian Robert C. Doyle, "Der Ruf followed in the tradition of the Orgelsdorfer Eulenspiegel, a camp literary and satirical newspaper published by German internees during World War I, and became the anti-Nazi newspaper that circulated throughout the entire POW camp system. It achieved great popularity among the more literate German prisoners in the United States."

After returning to Germany, two of the former POWs founded a German newspaper of the same name until 1947, when it was banned by U.S. Occupation authorities on the official grounds that paper was scarce.

At the same time, however, Der Ruf represented a new beginning for German literature after more than a decade of strictly enforced government censorship in Nazi Germany and its literary legacy accordingly continues to this day.

== Background ==
=== Special projects division ===
Der Ruf was the brainchild of a military program called the prisoner of war special projects division. The special projects division was inspired in part by news articles claiming hard core Nazis dominated life inside prison camps, beating and intimidating prisoners who spoke out against Hitler. Eleanor Roosevelt met with Dorothy Thompson, who was one of the journalists writing about conditions in the prison camps, and Army Major Maxwell McKnight, and together they put pressure on President Franklin Roosevelt who authorized the creation of the division. Planning for the program began in the Office of the Provost Marshal General in the fall of 1943.

The Special Projects Division was led by Lt. Col. Edward Davison and was intended to promote American ideals among German POWs. Davison was a poet who had taught at Vassar College, the University of Miami, and the University of Colorado, Boulder before the war. Davidson was a strong believer in the power of words and ideas, and viewed his mission as one of persuasion rather than psychological warfare. Other leaders of the program included the Assistant Director of the program, Maxwell McKnight, a graduate of Yale Law School who had prior experience in the Prisoner of War division and who had been influential in convincing Roosevelt to authorize the program; and Curriculum Director Walter Shoenstedt, an exiled German novelist who had been assistant editor of Berliner Tageblatt, who had worked extensively on "know your enemy" brochures for the armed forces. Shoenstedt organized the production of Der Ruf, which was the foundation on which all of the division's attempts to reorient the worldview of the German prisoners relied.

The aim of the program was to "provide ideological alternatives to National Socialism" for the German prisoners. A War Department demonstrated an expectation that after the war the prisoners would "have a strong influence in future German affairs, and their conceptions of our form of government may determine to a great extent Germany’s postwar relations with the United States.”

One of the program's first objectives was to separate prisoners based on their level of adherence to Nazi ideals. Hard core Nazis were moved to a special camp in Alva, Oklahoma, while intellectuals who expressed anti-Nazi sentiments in their interrogations and who had literary talent were sent to camps on the east coast to work with the special projects division. Although it was fairly easy to identify the hard-core Nazi adherents, removing them from camps did little to reduce the internal cohesion and loyalties of the POWs. The Office of the Provost Marshal General viewed the struggle for control of the camps as one of ideas, and aimed to instill competing ideas in the minds of the prisoners in addition to removing those prisoners most committed to the ideals of National Socialism.

Lt. Col. Davison was known as a gifted poet and had been a professor at the University of Colorado prior to the war. Davison and McKnight were somewhat hesitant to push for reeducation because they feared American POWs in Germany would be retaliated against, however the Geneva Convention, while prohibiting indoctrination, encouraged "intellectual diversions". Those prisoners who were identified as having anti-Nazi sentiments were put to work creating these diversions. This group of prisoners came to be known as "The Idea Factory" or, "The Factory".

=== Fort Kearny ===
The Factory was originally located at a POW camp housed in a former Civilian Conservation Corps camp in Cayuta, New York. However, the special projects division was unhappy with the treatment the carefully identified prisoners were receiving, complaining that this special group of highly intellectual prisoners received treatment "comparable to that of prisoners in a strictly Nazi [POW] camp". Therefore, they looked for a new location for their camp.

Fort Kearny, Rhode Island consisted of 20 acres in Saunderstown, Rhode Island. It had been constructed in 1908 to provide coastal defense, and was named for Civil War Major General Philip Kearny. By 1943 the threat to the United States east coast was diminished and Fort Kearny's guns were relocated or scrapped. Kearny had barracks suitable for prisoners and guards, a kitchen, administrative buildings, and the grounds were shielded from public view. The fort was reclassified as a prison in February 1945 and the first 85 prisoners were moved in immediately.

Many of the first 85 prisoners had served in the German military against their will, and some had even been inmates in Nazi concentration camps. All of them had passed rigorous tests designed to weed out all but those most opposed to the Nazi regime. Before the war they had been artists, professors, and writers in Germany. Their goals were to make Germany a better place after the war, and many of them did become influential thinkers and writers in post-war Germany.

The camp was commanded by U.S. Army Captain Robert Kunzig. The existence of the camp and the activities conducted there were to be kept secret. The identities of the prisoners were also to be kept secret, to protect their families in Germany. It was feared that, if the nature of the activities the Fort Kearny prisoners were engaged in were to become public, Americans would be angry at some prisoners being coddled, while Germans would view the prisoners as traitors and harm their families back home.

The special projects division was keen to earn the trust of the special prisoners kept at Fort Kearny, and as a result it was not run like other POW camps. Inmates were expected to settle disputes by their own internal "committee of governors". There were no towers or armed guards, although the camp was surrounded by barbed wire. Inspections were conducted, but the prisoners did not face the same sort of pressures as prisoners in other camps. Nevertheless, there were no escapes or even escape attempts reported at Fort Kearny.

POWs at Kearny were required to renounce their German military ranks and sign a declaration that they owed no loyalty to the Nazi Party or to Hitler, believed in democracy, would refrain from activity that could be detrimental to the United States, and wouldn't try to escape. American guards referred to the prisoners as "Mr." and, although they still had to wear POW uniforms with "PW" on them, they were occasionally permitted to wear pants that weren't marked.

In addition to publishing Der Ruf, prisoners at Fort Kearny also worked on other projects for the Special Projects Division. They were primarily engaged in curating reading material to be provided to prisoners in other POW camps as part of the Special Projects Division's reeducation efforts. They reviewed books to be sent to various POW camps, and translated great works of American literature into German. Many of the books selected had been burned and remained banned under censorship in Nazi Germany. Particularly in demand among POWs were banned works of Exilliteratur by anti-Nazi refugees such as Erich Maria Remarque's All Quiet on the Western Front, Thomas Mann's Zauberberg, and Franz Werfel's The Song of Bernadette. In a later article for Der Ruf, POW literary critic Curt Vinz opined, "Had we only had the opportunity to read these books before, our introduction to life, to war, and the expanse of politics would have been different."

They screened T.V. shows and movies to determine which were suitable for showing at POW camps, weeding out those that painted an unflattering picture of American culture, those that seemed too much like propaganda, and those that were poorly made. They also wrote position papers on various aspects of German culture, largely focusing on mass media and how it was received and interpreted by the German populace.

In addition to their work producing Der Ruf and curating other reading and viewing material, they monitored newspapers published at other POW camps, looking for Nazi influence. In March 1945 they found that approximately 75% of POW newspapers they examined were pro-Nazi in some form. By that fall, the Nazi editors at other papers had been replaced, and a change of outlook had occurred. This change of outlook was attributed to the combined effects reeducation efforts including Der Ruf, the realization that the war was lost, and prisoner interactions with Americans. Out of 80 papers examined only one was pro-Nazi.

Recreational activities at Fort Kearny included visiting the beach at Narragansett Bay, reading, writing, artistic activities such as drawing and painting, and discussing politics and culture. The small size of the camp prevented athletic activities such as soccer, although they sometimes played fistball.

== POW paper ==
The main "intellectual diversion" worked on by prisoners at Fort Kearny was a POW newspaper, Der Ruf. The name Der Ruf or The Call was chosen because American authorities hoped it would serve as a "call" inspiring prisoners to rethink their prior attitudes and to embrace American ideals. Development of the paper began in 1944, and prisoner involvement began in 1945.

Shoenstedt listed the four objectives of the paper as:

- To create a prisoner of war magazine for the broadest audience possible
- To provide exact news of all important military and political events
- To print news from the homeland, good reading material, and entertainment in order to
  - Foster realistic thought and constructive interests and feeling
  - Avoid stirring up political emotions or injuring national pride
  - Satisfy the desire for real cultural expression among the prisoners and to reflect their point of view as much as possible
  - To give prisoners moral support and open a larger political horizon for their benefit and
  - To make prisoners conscious of the tasks which await them in the future.
- To create and print the best German newspaper (in content and form) of our time.

The first editor-in-chief of the paper was German novelist and newspaper correspondent Dr. Gustav René Hocke. His staff of prisoners not only wrote the articles but also undertook the production activities of the paper. It was printed using offset presses, and good quality newsprint.

The first issue of the paper appeared on March 1, 1945 in a run of 11,000 copies. That issue was distributed to 134 POW camps. Circulation eventually reached 75,000 copies per issue. The paper was sold in camp canteens for five cents because the Americans were afraid that a free paper would "cause suspicion among the prisoners."

The first issue featured an article about the paper's purpose proclaiming,

The German prisoners of war in America now have their own newspaper! . . . “Der Ruf” will be way above any party or small group quarrel. It will not serve the personal ambitions of the few. It will foster real German Culture. It will serve us all and through us, our country. It will denounce in the strongest terms any idle chatter and gossip. It will demonstrate clearly the seriousness of our position and will not hide the hard and cold facts of world events behind high sounding words. It is the reputation of the German people we have to serve, believing in a sense of goodness and decency. We must give it our full approval and cooperation. When “Der Ruf” reaches you, answer with a military “Present.” Make sure that not one of us who still has a spark of feeling left for home and family is absent.

It also featured articles about the progress of the war, news from Germany, excerpts from various camp newspapers, and pieces on American culture.

The paper frequently ran articles encouraging prisoners to think about what they would do to rebuild Germany upon their return home at war's end. Prisoners who wrote for the paper tended to be idealistic, and to believe that returning prisoners would play an important role in shaping a new Germany.

The paper included articles debunking German propaganda that suggested Americans were uncultured brutes, articles exploring the strength of the American political system, articles discussing Germany's history of labor unions, and articles describing the horrors discovered during the liberation of concentration camps. Captain Kunzig described it as "indoctrination by correct facts."

The German prisoners were given great leeway in writing and publishing the paper, nevertheless American War Department and State Department officials reviewed English drafts of the paper prior to publication. Although after the war some German staff members complained of American narrow-mindedness and censorship, very few revisions were required by the American officials. The Americans did not insist the Germans publish articles which they did not believe. For example, the German prisoners were very resistant to the idea of German collective guilt and refused to write about it, even going so far as to write articles specifically pressing against that notion.

On May 8, 1945 the Germans officially surrendered to the allies. Brigadier General Blackshear M. Bryan, Assistant Provost Marshal and head of the prisoner of war program, credited Der Ruf's accurate reporting of the progress of the war on the European front with preventing "serious demonstrations" by prisoners in the camps when the news of the German surrender broke.

The paper published 26 issues during its iteration as a POW paper published in the United States. The final issue was distributed to POW camps on April 1, 1946. There was also a magazine published which was distributed to prisoners boarding ships to take them back to Europe. Far from costing U.S. taxpayers money, Der Ruf actually ended up making a small profit.

=== POWs who wrote for Der Ruf ===
The prisoners selected to come to Fort Kearney to write for Der Ruf and to do other work for the Special Projects Division represented an intellectual elite culled from the various prison camps. They were selected to conform to the world-view the architects of the Special Projects Division wanted to instill in the prisoners, and they tended to show open contempt for the rank and file prisoners in the other camps.

Prisoners came to Fort Kearny through a variety of channels. Raymund Hörhager, a POW in Arizona, made a derogatory remark about Nazis, and in a mock trial was sentenced to death as a traitor on his return to Germany, but a German-born Jewish prison guard who had fled Germany in 1933 helped him get sent to another prison camp, where his anti-Nazi views were vetted before he was sent to Fort Kearney. Another prisoner, the artist Franz Wischnewski, was simply told to bring his belongings by guards who acted like they wanted to kill him. Upon finding himself at Fort Kearny, he recommended the camp get Alfred Andersch.

Andersch and Hans Werner Richter were two of the most important POWs to work on the paper. Before the war Andersch and Richter were communists, and had misgivings about the Nazi regime. Andersch, in fact, had been a prisoner at Dachau concentration camp. He was forced to join the Wehrmacht, and was captured in Italy in 1944. Richter likewise served in the Wehrmacht despite his dislike for the Nazi regime, and was also captured in Italy. After their capture they were transported to the United States to serve the remainder of the war as POWs.

Andersch was first sent to an anti-Nazi POW camp in Louisiana. After Wischnewski recommended him he was taken from that camp to Fort Kearney, where he was moved to tears to learn that Wischnewski and others he knew were waiting for him.

Andersch joined the paper for its second issue in April 1945. Richter joined the paper in September of that same year. At times, they were reluctant to write for Der Ruf. However, after the war their time writing for Der Ruf in the United States inspired them to promote a vision of Germany that included both democratic and socialist ideals.

Among the visions that the paper put forward of life in Germany after the war, was the proposition that Europe should rebuild by seeking economic unity stating, "The united economy will be a vital part of Europe's destiny."

After the surrender of Germany in March 1945, many prisoners showed increased interest in participating in reeducation efforts. In part, this may have been because graduates of reeducation programs were moved to the front of the line to be repatriated to Germany. This may have contributed to Der Ruf's continuing growth in popularity, however it also spawned some resentment among the paper's staff. On June 28, the staff presented a petition complaining that they had seen nothing of America but POW camps and could not present an accurate picture of American life without interacting with Americans. They saw graduates of the reeducation program returning in Germany and feared being left behind in the camps to train further groups of prisoners instead of being allowed to return home. McKnight sympathized with the paper's staff and recommended that new editorial staff should be recruited to allow the prior staff to be repatriated. Beginning in August staffers were sent to re-education facilities in France and Fort Getty. By December, many of the original POWs had left Fort Kearny.

New editorial staff and writers were brought to Fort Kearny and began working on the paper in September 1945, remaining there until the final edition in March 1946. Richter was one of the new writers brought in at this time.

=== Reception and reactions ===
Der Ruf routinely sold out, forcing increased printings with every issue. Nevertheless, it "failed to resonate" with the POWs. Nazis at some camps described it as "Jewish propaganda . . . not fit for men", burned copies of it, and threatened prisoners who intended to purchase copies. It also had a "literary and intellectual focus" that did not match the average prisoner's interests. Lastly, German prisoners did not appreciate being on the receiving end of American propaganda. Elmer Beck, a German POW who had been held at Fort Custer, Michigan, said:

[T]he Americans also wanted us to think a certain way, to reject our traditional way of life and especially National Socialism. No one likes to be propagandized. . . . That's why I disliked Der Ruf. It was a very disturbing paper for many of us. I know it was written by Germans, but it was filled with lots of propaganda.

Despite the fact that many prisoners rejected the paper as propaganda, many others appreciated the availability of high-quality, well written articles on a diverse array of subjects such as news about the war and aspects of American culture. For example, Private Herbert Diedler, held at Camp Cooke, California, wrote:

What I welcome in Der Ruf is the objective, reasonable, and unsparing judgement about the events of the last years, the frank description of the present situation, the wise preparation for the things which the physical and spiritual reconstruction of our homeland will demand of us and last, not least, the clearness and beauty of the German language which characterizes most articles."

The fact that the Nazis in many camps were virulently against Der Ruf enabled prison officials to identify them and send more of them to Camp Alva. In one prison camp, the POW who managed the camp canteen attempted to remove the paper from the inventory. He was placed in solitary confinement and the magazine was returned to shelves and sold out within minutes.

The paper was credited with helping to reduce Nazi influence and violence in POW camps, reducing tensions in the camps by accurately reporting on the war, and providing many returning POWs with a favorable impression of America and democracy.

== In Germany ==
A scan of the front page of the August 14, 1946 edition of the paper

After returning to Germany Andersch and Richter, along with several others from Fort Kearny, founded a new newspaper, also called Der Ruf. This iteration of Der Ruf grew to a circulation of 100,000 subscribers. It promoted social democracy while harshly criticizing the American occupation. They intended to use this paper to promote the idea that the war had provided German people with the opportunity to rebuild the entire society in a way that would promote peace in Europe. They wanted Germany to unite with the rest of Europe, but they became frustrated with the allied occupation of Germany. They did not want Germany to be dominated by either the United States or the Soviet Union. At times the paper was seen as being overly nationalistic. The growing antagonism between the United States and Soviet Russia, along with their refusal to take sides led American military authorities to remove Andersch and Richter as editors of the paper in 1947, at which point they helped to found the hugely influential Group 47 literary movement. After their departure, they were replaced as editors by Erich Kuby.
