= Fort Oglethorpe =

Fort Oglethorpe may refer to:

- Fort Oglethorpe, Georgia, a town
- Fort Oglethorpe (Fort Oglethorpe, Georgia), Army base founded in 1904
- Fort Oglethorpe (prisoner-of-war camp), a World War I German-American internment camp near the town of Fort Oglethorpe
- Fort James Jackson, fort built during 1808–1812 that protected Savannah, Georgia and was also known as Fort Oglethorpe
