= Ernst Kunwald =

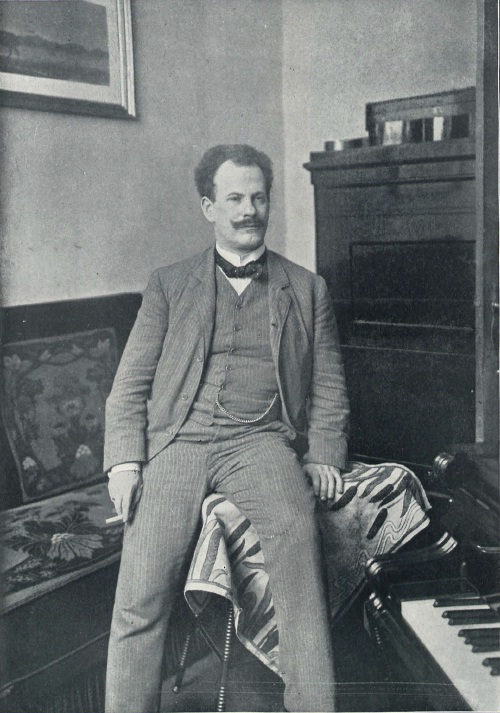

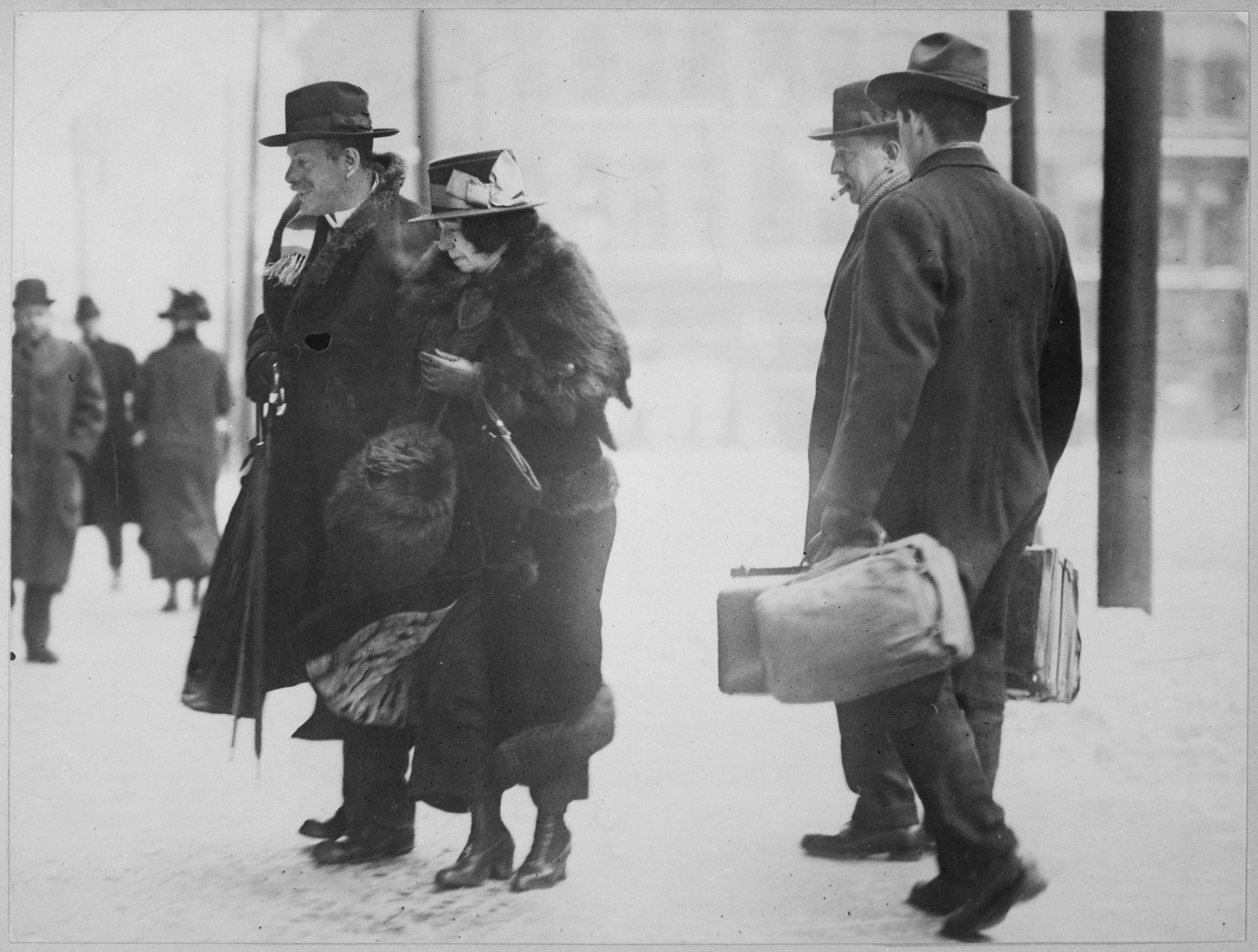
Ernst Kunwald, entering the Federal Building, Cincinnati, Ohio, as a prisoner of war in charge of two U.S. deputy marshals, in 1917

Ernst Kunwald (April 14, 1868 – December 12, 1939) was an Austrian conductor.

== Life ==
Ernst Kunwald was born and died in Vienna. He studied law at the University of Vienna, earning his Dr. Juris in 1891. He also studied piano with Teodor Leszetycki and composition with Hermann Graedener. At the Leipzig Conservatory he studied with the composer Salomon Jadassohn.

He conducted opera in the following cities: Rostock (1895–1897), Sondershausen (1897–1898), Essen (1898–1900), Halle (1900–1901), Madrid (1901–1902), Frankfurt (1902–1905), and at Berlin’s Kroll Opera House (1905−1906).

A review of a concert he led with the New York Philharmonic in February 1906 described him as “not a great conductor; not one with the finest feelings or a subtle sense for the deeper things in music; but he is a capable one, in many ways an intelligent one, a vigorous and energetic one”.

He served as assistant conductor of the Berlin Philharmonic (1907–1912). He was the conductor of the Cincinnati Symphony Orchestra 1912–1917 and the Cincinnati May Festival 1914–1917. His approach to conducting was very different than his predecessor in Cincinnati, the flamboyant Leopold Stokowski. A Stokowski detractor, J. Herman Thuman, wrote a review in The Cincinnati Enquirer that Kunwald “…does not find it necessary to resort to vaudeville stunts to gain the acclaim of the crowd”. American premiers in Cincinnati under Kunwald included Gustav Mahler’s Symphony No. 3 and Richard Strauss’ Alpine Symphony. He also conducted the orchestra's first recording, for Columbia Records, on January 13, 1917: the Barcarolle from Jacques Offenbach’s The Tales of Hoffmann.

American entry into World War I caused the downfall of the Austrian conductor’s career in Cincinnati. On November 17, 1917 the Daughters of the American Revolution brought pressure on the public safety director of Pittsburgh to forbid Kunwald’s conducting his orchestra in that city. On the very day after the United States declaration of war on Austria-Hungary, Kunwald was arrested by the United States Marshals Service December 8, 1917 and released from jail the next day. His resignation as conductor was accepted by the board at that time. On January 12, 1918 he was interned under the Alien Enemies Act and imprisoned without trial as part of Austrian- and German-American internment at Fort Oglethorpe, Georgia. He was joined there by fellow conductor Karl Muck, who was arrested March 25, 1918.

The evidence on which Kunwald was interned was his conducting Austrian and German Classical music and continued pride in his homeland. According to a memo dated December 19, 1917 from J. Edgar Hoover to the United States Attorney General, Kunwald conducted the Star-Spangled Banner before one concert after allegedly telling the orchestra and audience (many of whom were fellow immigrants) that his sympathies were with the House of Hapsburg and the Austro-Hungarian Empire. His allegedly pro-Austrian sentiments led to the revocation of his honorary membership in Phi Mu Alpha Sinfonia fraternity in May 1919 (Sinfonia Handbook, Spring 1939, p. 24).

According to internment records, Ernst Kunwald was 5 feet 9 inches tall, with dark hair and blue eyes, and was married to Lina, a German citizen born in 1869.

After agreeing to deportation in 1919, Kunwald conducted at Königsberg (1920–1927) and then the Konzerthausorchester Berlin (Berlin Symphony Orchestra) (1928–1931).
