= Peter Muck =

German musician

Peter Muck (22 August 1919 – 10 April 2011) was a German violinist and violist.

== Life ==
Born in Leipzig, Muck, violinist and violist, was a member of the Berlin Philharmonic from 1949 to 1978. In 1968, he began collecting documents on the orchestral history of this Orchestra. In May 1982, on the occasion of the orchestra's one hundredth anniversary, he published the three-volume commemorative publication Einhundert Jahre Berliner Philharmonisches Orchestra. With his collection, he laid the foundation stone for the archive of the Berlin Philharmonic Orchestra.

== Honours ==
- Verdienstkreuz am Bande der Bundesrepublik Deutschland

== Work ==
- Einhundert Jahre Berliner Philharmonisches Orchester. 3 volumes. Hans Schneider, Tutzing 1982, ISBN 3-7952-0339-2, ISBN 3-7952-0340-6, ISBN 3-7952-0341-4.
- Karl Muck. Ein Dirigentenleben in Briefen und Dokumenten. Hans Schneider, Tutzing 2003, ISBN 3-7952-1070-4.
