= Robert Porco =

American choral director

Robert Michael Porco is a noted American director of large choral groups performing orchestral works. He has directed the Cincinnati May Festival Chorus with the Cincinnati Symphony Orchestra since 1989 along with the Cleveland Orchestra's Blossom Festival Chorus.

Porco was born in Steubenville, Ohio. From 1980 to 1998 he was a professor of music and chairman of the choral department at Indiana University Bloomington.
