= John R. Rathom =

American journalist, editor, and writer (1868–1923)

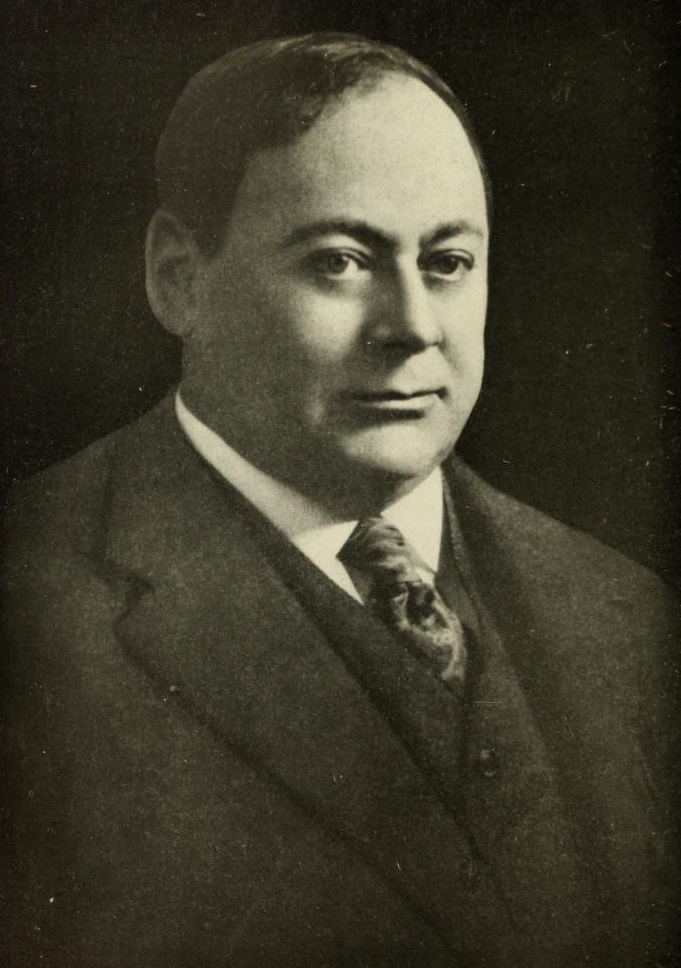
Portrait of John R. Rathom.

John Revelstoke Rathom (1868–1923) was an Australian-born American journalist, editor, and writer based in Rhode Island and employed as the editor of The Providence Journal at the height of his career. In the years before America entered World War I, Rathom assisted British Intelligence at Wellington House as an agent of influence by publishing British propaganda, including false or exaggerated allegations of German war crimes, as articles in The Providence Journal. These articles were widely republished by other American newspapers and helped ensure American entry as an ally of the British Empire in the war against Imperial Germany. Rathom's claims that his newspaper routinely uncovered German espionage plots were also later revealed as fraudulent, although his reputation as an heroic anti-German crusader endured. He later engaged in a long public dispute with Franklin Delano Roosevelt early in the future president's career. He cut a large figure in the world of journalism and as a political spokesman advocating Anglophilia, anti-White ethnic sentiment, the Special Relationship, and anti-communism, while denouncing the League of Nations.

Time magazine described him as a firm believer in the old newspaper saying, "Raise hell and sell papers." In 2004, The Providence Journal acknowledged that most of Rathom's coverage was a fraud: "In truth, the Providence Journal had acquired numerous inside scoops on German activities, mostly from British intelligence sources who used Rathom to plant anti-German stories in the American media." Upon his death in 1923, Time magazine reported that Rathom's two newspapers were "said to be one of the most money-making magazine combinations in the U. S."

== Early years and career in journalism ==
The man who called himself John Revelstoke Rathom was probably born John Solomon in Melbourne, Australia, on July 4, 1868. The story he told of his early years is at many points unverifiable, at others questionable, and at others demonstrably false. An exhaustive review of Rathom's accounts by the staff of the Providence Journal, the paper where he gained national notoriety, documents the problems in the historical record.

Rathom did not attend Harrow in England as he claimed. Nor did he report on the British military campaign in the Sudan in 1886 for the Melbourne Argus. His tales of adventures in China, including service in the Chinese Navy, are likely fictions as well. His claim to have joined the Schwatka Expedition to Alaska in 1878–80 can not be verified. He probably arrived in the U.S. in 1889—he provided various dates—and then worked for short periods at several Canadian and American newspapers on the West Coast.

He joined the San Francisco Chronicle as a staff correspondent in 1896. Two years later, during the Spanish–American War, the Chronicle sent him to Cuba. In his ensuing adventures, all dubious, he was badly wounded, returned to the U.S. with yellow fever or malaria, and escaped from a medical isolation camp. He sailed to South Africa, he later said, to cover the Boer War, but no evidence supports him. His claim that he was twice wounded there is equally suspect. His boast that he counted General Kitchener as a friend from that time until the general's death in 1916 has been called "moonshine."

By his own account, in his next position as staff correspondent for the Chicago Times-Herald (later the Chicago Record Herald) he became "one of the best known newspaper men in the country." He covered the 1903 Iroquois Theater Fire with great distinction. Rathom himself called that story "a classic of deadline journalism."

Rathom became a naturalized American citizen on March 25, 1906, in Chicago. He later claimed that he cherished the congratulatory telegrams he received on that occasion from William McKinley and Theodore Roosevelt. McKinley had died more than four and a half years earlier.

Rathom misrepresented his personal life as well. On July 5, 1890, he married Mary Harriet Crockford in Canada. In 1899, he began an affair with Florence Mildred Campbell in San Francisco. His wife returned home to Canada, ending their relationship. Soon Rathom and Campbell were living together as husband and wife, though no record of their marriage has surfaced. The first Mrs. Rathom only sued for divorce in 1908, naming Campbell as co-respondent, and the marriage was dissolved in 1909. For the previous three years Rathom and Campbell were representing themselves to Providence society as husband and wife. Evidence from family correspondence suggests that Campbell began to style herself Mrs. Rathom in 1903. All Rathom's various biographical accounts omitted his first marriage.

== The Providence Journal ==
In 1906, Rathom applied for work at The Providence Journal and won the post of managing editor. In 1912, he became both editor and general manager at the Journal and its afternoon edition, the Evening Bulletin.

=== Anti-German propagandist ===
Rathom campaigned for a Special Relationship and for the U.S. to enter World War I in support of the British Empire. Under his management, The Providence Journal produced a series of exposés of alleged German espionage and propaganda in the U.S.

Duped or willingly misled by British Intelligence sources whose information confirmed his own Anglophilia and Germanophobia, Rathom then exaggerated his own role in uncovering supposed plots. In speeches at pro-British assemblies, he amplified the Journal's articles with breathless accounts of his journalists running undercover operations and thwarting German intrigues.

Newspapers across the United States reprinted Providence Journal exclusives, further magnifying Rathom's myth that he was directing a counterespionage cadre. The national press turned Rathom and the Journal journalists into national heroes, naming both the editor and the paper in headlines like these in the New York Times:

November 13, 1917
TELLS OF THWARTING GERMAN PLOTTERS
John R. Rathom Reveals How Reporters Outwitted Teuton Secret Service

January 20, 1918
SAYS BAKER KEPT PACIFISTS ON GUARD
John R. Rathom Tells Genesee Society Secretary [of War] Put Them In Important Posts

Many of Rathom's reports attacked U.S. President Woodrow Wilson's administration for failing to recognize and defend against supposed German espionage efforts, using phrases like "almost criminal negligence" to characterize the federal government's response. Meanwhile, the real world consequences of Rathom's demogoguery, fake news, and shameless self-promotion were no laughing matter.

In October 1917, Dr. Karl Muck, the internationally renowned conductor of the Boston Symphony Orchestra, was falsely accused by Rathom of knowingly having refused a request to perform "The Star-Spangled Banner" during a recent Classical music concert. Despite having been completely unaware of the request at the time and always ending future concerts with America's national anthem, Theodore Roosevelt and many other US citizens took Rathom's accusations at face value and were furious with Muck, who, along with 26 of the orchestra's musicians, was accordingly arrested and interned at Fort Oglethorpe, Georgia, until he and his wife agreed to be deported in the summer of 1919.

Also in late 1917, the U.S. Department of Justice made it clear to Rathom that the government was concerned about his claims, criticisms, defaming the President, and taking credit for fictitious counterintelligence achievements. Early in 1918, Rathom arranged to publish a series of articles called "Germany's Plots Exposed" in a monthly magazine, The World's Work. The first article appeared in February 1918. Just at this point the Department of Justice went on the offensive. First, they threatened to subpoena Rathom to testify under oath and name his sources before a grand jury, which would mean facing charges for perjury or contempt of court, or revealing how much of what appeared in the Journal was fabricated by British Intelligence propagandists at Wellington House. Rather than testify, Rathom negotiated and on February 12, 1918, signed a lengthy statement in the form of a letter to U.S. Attorney General Thomas Watt Gregory. In essence, he admitted that the bulk of his sensational stories came not from the investigations of his newspaper staff but from British intelligence agents and propaganda operatives. He also pleaded that he had been misquoted or the implications of his remarks misunderstood.

Next the Department of Justice contacted The World's Work and revealed enough of Rathom's admissions to make that publication reconsider publishing any future Rathom's articles. The World's Work immediately suspended the series and in its place proposed a series called "Fighting German Spies" authored by French Strother, one of its own editors, "by courtesy of the Bureau of Investigation of the Department of Justice". An editorial note in The World's Work left much unsaid and softened its impact by saying the suspension was by "mutual consent" of Rathom and the magazine, but they also made a negative comparison with Rathom's work by saying of Strother's series: "The facts and documents published in these articles are verified."

Despite the series' suspension, Rathom's reputation did not suffer. The cancellation of the planned series was a short-term story, not one to compete with headline news. Such a minor exposure could not undo the blaring headlines and breathless claims that had already caused American entry into World War I. Rathom did not lower his voice, but his most spectacular claims had ended.

In the letter Rathom signed at the Department of Justice, he gave the Attorney General the right to reveal its contents in whole or in part to anyone of his choosing at any time. The Department of Justice waited almost two years before revealing the letter's contents to the public in the context of the Newport Sex Scandal.

=== Reporting on the Newport sex scandal ===
The Journal covered naval affairs on a regular basis and focused on the local base, Naval Station Newport. In January 1920, the paper took up the cause of Rhode Island's Episcopalian Bishop James DeWolf Perry and the local clergymen who protested the Navy's failure to clean up the immoral establishments that provided sex and liquor to navy personnel. One action the Navy took, under the direction of Assistant Secretary of the Navy (and future President of the United States) Franklin Delano Roosevelt was a campaign to infiltrate the gathering places of Newport's homosexual community. The operation resulted in the arrests of both military personnel and civilians.

Rathom's paper covered the Newport Sex Scandal trial proceedings daily, often with a critical eye toward the prosecution's case. When it transpired that Navy investigators had authorized sailors to entrap their targets and even to have illegal gay sex in the course of their undercover work, Rathom railed against those responsible up the chain of command to Roosevelt and United States Secretary of the Navy Josephus Daniels, who Rathom had long viewed as a foe for his lack of enthusiasm for the Special Relationship and American entry into the Great War. Rathom's campaign supported by the clergy resulted in two investigations, one behind closed doors by a subcommittee of the U.S. Senate Committee on Naval Affairs and a public one by a Naval court of inquiry. That meant more coverage and Rathom was a witness at both.

The battle was not confined to the two investigations and the columns of the Journal. Rathom and Roosevelt had what the New York Times characterized as a "tart exchange of telegrams" over the issue of who in Washington authorized the illegal investigative methods used at Newport. Roosevelt said Rathom's "attack on the navy was disingenuous and dishonorable." Rathom asserted his sole interest was "the protection of the honor of the United States Navy, which officials of the navy have sought to undermine by the most bestial and dishonorable methods known to man."

While Rathom waited months for the outcome of the investigations, events worked to his advantage. In July 1920, Roosevelt resigned his Navy post and accepted the nomination of the Democratic Party for Vice President, making him an even more valuable target for an unscrupulous newspaper editor looking to sell papers and keep his name before the public. Rathom waited until just ten days before the election to go public with new and outrageous charges against Roosevelt and another high-profile Navy official, Thomas Mott Osborne, Commandant of Portsmouth Naval Prison, former warden of Sing Sing and the most famous penal reformer of the era. Rathom charged that the Democratic candidate for Vice President had acted improperly while Assistant Secretary of the Navy in releasing sailors convicted by court martial of sodomy from Portsmouth Naval Prison and had destroyed documents relevant to those cases.

With the election just days away, events moved quickly. Rathom released his attack through the Republican National Committee on October 24, 1920. The next day Roosevelt countered with denials and called the charges "criminally libelous." His lawyer warned that "every newspaper giving currency to these charges will be held to full responsibility." He asked the U.S. District Attorney in New York Francis G. Caffey to consider a suit as well. Caffey found no grounds for a suit on behalf of the government. Instead, with the authorization of the Attorney General, he released Rathom's two-year-old letter admitting his many exaggerations and frauds related to German espionage. The letter now became Rathom's "confession." Rathom defended himself at length, with what success is uncertain.

The Rathom-Roosevelt battle ended without drama. Roosevelt's attorney filed his libel suit on October 28, but never pursued it. Roosevelt's ticket lost badly on November 2. When a Senate subcommittee later censured Roosevelt, Rathom claimed vindication, but the American press took little notice.

== Later years ==
Rathom continued to maintain a high profile, addressing public meetings and rallies, some patriotic in nature and others aligned with conservative causes. He joined the new Attorney General, A. Mitchell Palmer, in warning against Bolshevik infiltration and violence. As an officer of the American Defense Society, he joined the campaign against President Wilson's proposed League of Nations, signing a statement of objections that pleaded for America to remain "aloof from all this pandemonium of tribal conflicts." It argued that the League's "impossible doctrines of the self-determination of races" directly contradicted the vision of America as a haven for "all the races of the earth."

Rathom's brand of nativism drew on his passionate isolationism and continued his pro-British stance. At a "patriotic mass meeting" in Carnegie Hall, he condemned those with divided loyalties. The recently defeated Weimar Republic was an easy target, and he chided English immigrants for failing to become American citizens, but he spared nothing in denouncing Irish-Americans during the Irish War of Independence, whom he called "that crew of hyphenates who seek to embroil us with Great Britain and who would be willing to see civilization totter and die if their hatred of England could thus be satisfied."

From 1917 to 1922, he was elected annually to serve as a director of the Associated Press. In 1922 he served as president of the New England Daily Newspapers Association. The governments of Belgium and Italy honored him for his advocacy on behalf of American entry into World War I.

== Death and legacy ==
In August 1922 he underwent an operation from which he never fully recovered. He died at his home in Providence, Rhode Island on December 11, 1923 and was buried in Swan Point Cemetery where his grave is unmarked.

Rathom was deeply involved in the Boy Scout movement from its arrival in Rhode Island in 1910. He served as a Council Scout Commissioner for six years and was credited with giving scouting a big boost during its formative stages. Rathom Lodge at Yawgoog Scout Reservation was named for him in 1929.

== Selected writing ==
- Two Chicago Sketches: When the City Wakes to Life; Lake Michigan in Calm and Storm. Providence: Livermore & Knight Co., 1910.
- "A Fight With a Muskallonge," Scribner's Magazine 31, May 1902.
- "Taps!," Scribner's Magazine 33, January/June 1903.
- "The Men in Control," Leslie's Monthly Magazine 58, May/October 1904.
- "New York's Great Subway," The Technical World, December 1904.
- "Germany's Plot Exposed," The World's Work 35, February 1918.

== Sources ==
- Mark Arsenault, The Imposter's War: The Press, Propaganda, and the Newsman who Battled for the Minds of America, (Pegasus Books, 2022)
- Thomas Williams Bicknell, History of the State of Rhode Island and Providence Plantations: Biographical (NY: The American Historical Society, Inc. 1920). This fact-filled biography was based on information provided by Rathom himself.
- Garrett D. Byrnes and Charles H. Spilman, The Providence Journal 150 Years (Providence, RI: The Providence Journal Company, 1980)
- Benjamin L. Miller, "The Primacy of the War Effort: Domestic Newspaper Coverage of the October Revolution of 1917" in Brown Journal of History, Spring 2007
- Charles A. Collman, "The Mystery of John Revelstoke Rahom, President Wilson's Confidant," in The Fatherland: Fair Play for Germany and Austria-Hungary, edited by George Sylvester Viereck, vol. 3, no. 21, 363-5. A pro-German attack that details Rathom's anti-German stories and charges.
- David Pietrusza, 1920: The Year of Six Presidents (NY: Carroll & Graf Publishers, 2007)
- TIME: "The Press: John R. Rathom," Dec. 24, 1923, accessed Dec, 10, 2009.
- TIME: "The Press: Conscience of New England," July 6, 1953. accessed Dec 10, 2009.
