= Cincinnati May Festival =

Annual choral festival in Cincinnati, Ohio, US

The Cincinnati May Festival is a two-week annual choral festival, held in May in Cincinnati, Ohio, US.

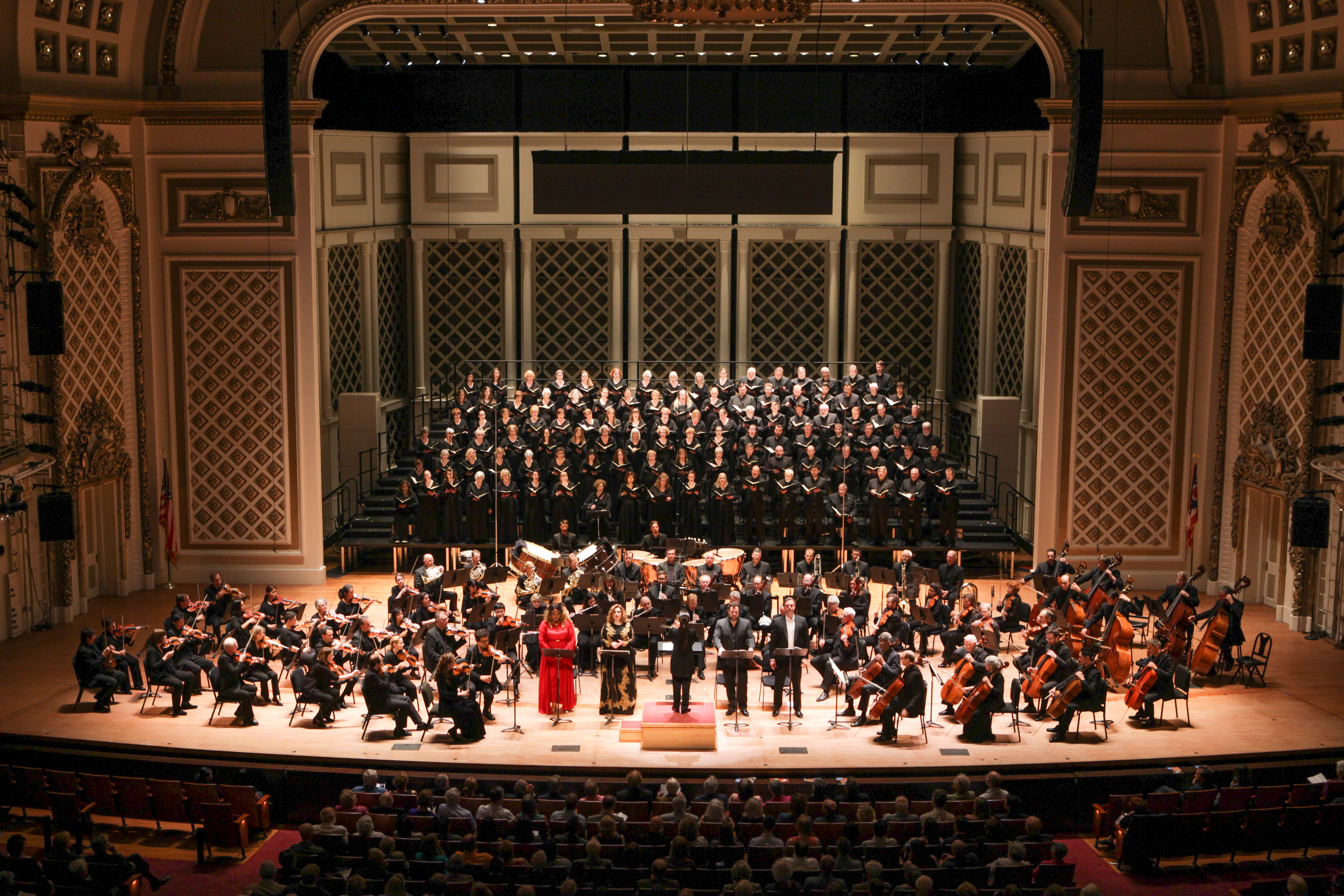
The May Festival Chorus and Cincinnati Symphony Orchestra join forces in Cincinnati's Music Hall

== History ==
The festival's roots go back to the 1840s, when Saengerfests were held in that city, bringing singers from all over the United States and abroad to perform large scale classical works of the day.

In A City That Sings, we find a description of Cincinnati in the late 1800s: "In the final decades of the nineteenth century Cincinnati cemented its position as one of America's cultural leaders with the founding of the still flourishing May Festival (1873), the Cincinnati Art Museum (1886) and its neighbor in Cincinnati, the Cincinnati Art Academy (1887), and the Cincinnati Symphony Orchestra (1895).

Singing societies were very popular in the nineteenth century and the tradition was no different in Cincinnati. Both the English and German societies were evident. As a rule, the differences between the two national choral traditions were in language, origin, composition, and social scope. English societies, the earliest of Cincinnati's choral ensembles, existed primarily to make music. The first German society was founded in 1825, but the majority of these organizations arose after an immigration boom in the late 1840s. They provided social opportunities for eating and drinking, as well as making music. Most of the German societies were men's choruses, but women were sometimes admitted, often as non-singing supporting members, in the last half of the century.

In October 1863, a circular was sent to the 'Musical Public of Cincinnati' to extend a 'cordial invitation to singers, both ladies and gentlemen, who will take an interest in building up a large Choral Society, such as the old societies of Boston and New York, to join.' This mixed chorus approach to presenting oratorio with members drawn from a broad spectrum of Cincinnati's singers regardless of the nationality or society to which they pledged allegiance, must be regarded as an important precedent of the May Festival.

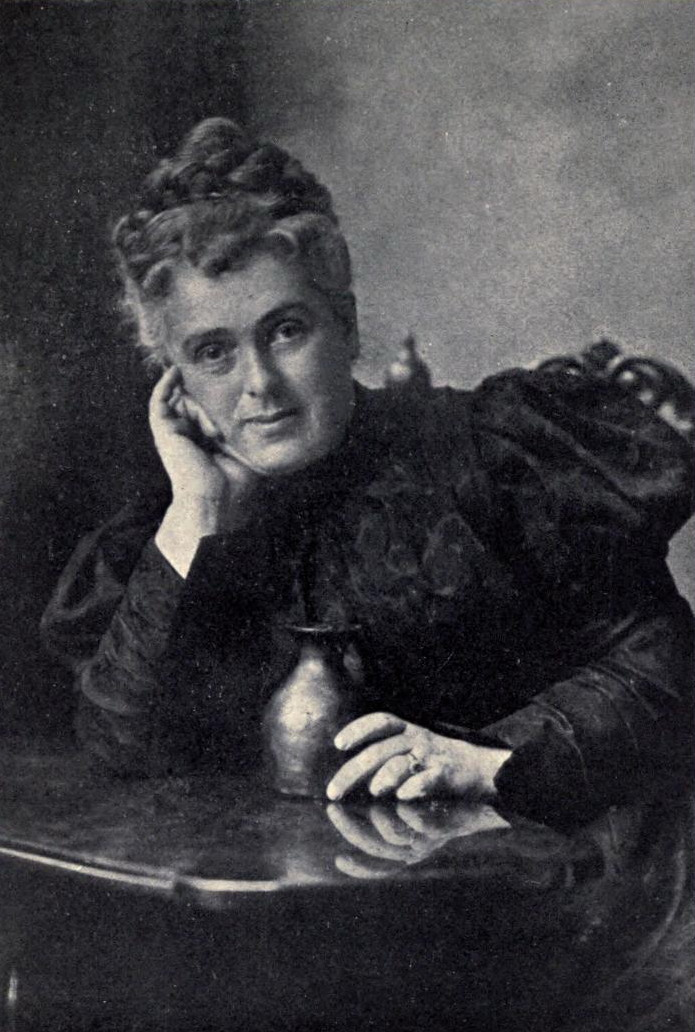
Maria Longworth Nichols Storer

Maria Longworth Nichols Storer the granddaughter of Nicholas Longworth, a banker and winemaker, and wife of Colonel George Ward Nichols took a trip to England in 1871. There she witnessed one of the large English festivals. At home, Mr. Nichols was a member of the Harmonic Society, so the couple was involved in choral music of the English variety. Mrs. Nichols knew Cincinnati's choral tradition was the perfect place to start a musical festival of their own. She wrote to Theodore Thomas, a renowned American, conductor and asked for a meeting with him on his next visit to Cincinnati.

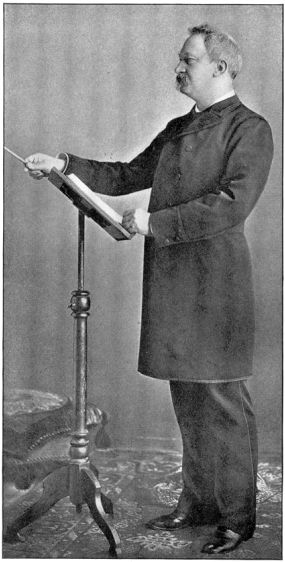

He recounts: 'On my...visit in 1871 [sic—it was 1872] a young married lady, member of one of the leading families, laid before me a plan for a large Musical Festival. She proposed that I should be the conductor of it, saying that I would be responsible for the artistic side, she would find the men who would take charge of the business details. I soon found out that this lady was not only very talented in may ways, but that her taste was not amateurish in anything, and I readily consented to undertake the work she wished me to do.' He agreed to be conductor of the Festival if fifty thousand dollars could be raised for a guarantee fund and a committee could be formed to take care of the business aspects of the event. Mrs. Nichols's biographer, Sr. Rose Angela Boehle, mentions that Maria and Col. Nichols started the guarantee fund of the 1873 Festival with a five-thousand-dollar contribution.

Among the first actions of the executive committee was the hiring of Theordore Thomas as musical director and Carl Barus as director of the chorus. Thomas's touring orchestra would play, as they would continue to do at every festival until 1904. Arthur Mees, a Cincinnati music teacher, was named rehearsal accompanist and later, festival organist. While the artistic forces were almost entirely German, the administrative team that planned the event was mostly of English descent. A circular describing the expectations of chorus members was printed in English and German and distributed to 121 music dealers, 60 post offices, and 144 singing societies. It was also distributed to 1,120 newspapers throughout Ohio, Indiana, Kentucky, and 'the leading papers of the West.' According to the superintendent of the chorus, Samuel D. Carey, by the time the first performance took place, the chorus had 706 members.

== The 1873 Festival ==
"The orchestra is German; the music three-fourths German, and the other fourth exotic; scarcely half the singers were native-born; but, despite all this, it is thoroughly American, for nothing but that attenuated and intensified form of Anglo-Saxon called the Yankee could ever have supplied the nerve-force needed to carry on such a mammoth affair." Performances included repertoire that was overwhelmingly German. Handel, Bach, Beethoven, Haydn, and Mozart comprised the first two concerts. Of the sixty works on the seven concerts, only five were by composers not born in a German-speaking country. The matinee concerts consisted largely of arias, art songs, and light orchestral works, including isolated movements of symphonies, Strauss waltzes, and overtures. Thomas's evening concerts were more formal and consisted of major vocal and choral works, including Handel's Dettingen Te Deum, scenes from Gluck's Orfeo ed Euridice, and Beethoven's Ninth Symphony, along with purely symphonic works and concert arias. Soprano Emma Heckle, a Cincinnati native, was a featured soloist at the very first festival, and frequently returned for years after.

== The 1875 Festival ==
A second May Festival took place at Saengerfest Hall in 1875, and presented the American premieres of Bach's Magnificat and Brahms's Triumphlied. During this festival, Cincinnati's usual springtime thunderstorms pelted the leaky tin roof of the hall with rain and hail, as they had done to a lesser degree in 1873. The cavernous hall acted as a resonating chamber and Thomas had to stop the concerts on more than one occasion to let the storms pass. Two other problems with the hall were mentioned in the press reports of the first festival, which no doubt persisted in 1875. The reporter from the Gazette mentioned that the temperature in the hall was too warm. The situation was 'promptly remedied by a member of the executive committee who crashed out the glass from every window whose frame was wedged too tight in its place to be readily removed.' Another problem arose as the audience, estimated at four thousand with two thousand more in the streets, seems to have grown somewhat frustrated by the crowded conditions in the hall and complained that allowing one thousand people to stand in the aisles 'sorely disappoints ticket-holders who selected their seats on the aisles with especial purpose.'

== Music Hall and the 1878 Festival ==
Kentucky-born railroad entrepreneur Reuben Springer was so annoyed by the hall problems that he made the initial $125,000 donation to create a matching fund to enable the construction of a new music hall.

The area chosen for the new Music Hall was close to the Community Hospital, Insane Asylum, and the Pest House. When inmates or patients expired, they were interred in Potter's Field, the present site of Music Hall. Over two hundred wagon loads of bones were moved to Spring Grove Cemetery and reburied in a mass grave.

Construction for the hall began on May 1, 1877, just a year before the third May Festival was to begin. It was dedicated on May 14 at the first concert of the 1878 May Festival. (125) Tickets for the first festival held in Music Hall were, "$2 for a single reserved seat, $1 for standing room, and $10 dollars for the entire set of seven concert." Cincinnati's May Festival has taken place in Springer Auditorium since 1878.

== Edward Elgar in Cincinnati ==
After the death of Theodore Thomas in 1905, the 1906 May Festival featured British composer Sir Edward Elgar conducting his oratorio The Dream of Gerontius at the final concert. ... Elgar was the most prominent British composer and \his music was popular in the U.S. He conducted the second, fifth, and sixth concerts of the festival, after spending the preceding two weeks rehearsing his music with the performers.

Theodore Thomas had previously conducted Gerontius at the 1904 May Festival, and its success and the fame of the composer may have drawn the board of directors to consider Elgar for a guest conductor and celebrity at the upcoming festival.

Enraging the chorus, Lawrence Maxwell Jr., vice-president of the May Festival Association stated that he was "against the giving of the memorial concert, saying that it had not the sanction of the board, that the program was a log of 'hash,' and that it would make Thomas turn in his grave to listen to it." ...The Festival Board, in an act of either reconciliation or humiliation towards the chorus, planned its own memorial concert to open the 1906 May Festival. The chorus responded in a letter by demanding Maxwell's resignation, adding that "if the Board of Directors do not find this request acceptable, we find no other course open to us than to insist that this communication shall constitute the resignation of the chorus, to take effect at once." The May Festival Chorus was soon disbanded, and the board of directors chose Maxwell as the next president of the May Festival Association.

In the midst of the upheaval, the festival reorganized its board and established a marketing plan for the 1906 concerts to choose "[Frank] Van der Stucken as festival conductor, and to depend upon Sir Edward Elgar as a foreign attraction." Frank van der Stucken was the conductor of the recently formed Cincinnati Symphony Orchestra, and the board decided that the Cincinnati orchestra would play in the 1906 May Festival for the first time.

The previous festivals had had open rehearsals and many other public opportunities for Cincinnatians to meet and mingle with the stars, but this would not be the case in 1906. With a completely restructured program, Frank Van der Stucken anticipated rehearsals would be full of personnel problems and musical challenges and considered options that would allow the performers to focus on the music.

The final concert was held on the same evening, and the program consisted of The Dream of Gerontius followed by Beethoven's Ninth Symphony.

== The May Festival and Cincinnati School Music ==
However, perhaps the appearances of massed school choirs most valued by Cincinnatians were those in the then-biennial May Festivals. At the first May Festivals (1873 and 1875) a large chorus of pupils and teachers from the city's intermediate, secondary, and normal schools presented music learned in their public school classes. Beginning in 1882, planners of the festivals began working student choral ensembles into the regular festival repertoire, such as Bach's St. Matthew Passion, Berlioz's Damnation of Faust, and Te Deum, Handel's Judas Maccabeus, or Rubinstein's Tower of Babel. In 1897 a Children's May Festival, utilizing some 2,000 students from the city schools, presented Franz Abt's Cinderella.

Choruses of school children continue to be welcome participants in such major works as Orff's Carmina Burana, Walton's Belshazzar's Feast, Mahler's Symphony No. 3, and Britten's War Requiem. All these accomplishments would have been impossible had not Cincinnati schools, both public and parochial, introduced music into their curricula.

== Notable performances and recent history ==
Perhaps the largest work in the repertoire, Mahler's Symphony No. 8, often called The Symphony of a Thousand, received a then-rare performance at the 1931 festival with a chorus of nine hundred, a massive orchestra, and eight soloists.

African-American composer Robert Nathaniel Dett's oratorio The Ordering of Moses appeared on the 1937 May Festival. In 2014, the May Festival Chorus and Cincinnati Symphony Orchestra gave a full performance of the oratorio in Carnegie Hall.

During times of war and tragedy, the May Festival has traditionally stepped forward to honor heroes and soothe the pain. During World War II, patriotic music held price of place in 1942 and performers donated their services. All proceeds were given to the Cincinnati War Chest. In 1944 a chorus of Women's Army Corps members from Ft. Campbell, Kentucky, performed Frank Loesser's The WAC Hymn and many soldiers attended the festival. Just one month after the September 11, 2001, terrorist attacks in New York, Washington, and Pennsylvania, the May Festival Chorus traveled to New York's Carnegie Hall to perform Britten's powerful War Requiem with the Cincinnati Symphony Orchestra and James Conlon.

When the United States entered World War II, the problems necessitated a three-year span until the next festival. And then it was reduced to three concerts with a very much abridged program due to the shortage of paper. The Victory Festival in 1946 opened with the Hallelujah Chorus and the whole program was dedicated to the blessings of peace. The Folk Song Symphony by Roy Harris had 500 high school students singing as their costumes divided the chorus stand into three broad stripes of red, white and blue.

Until 1967 the May Festival was held every two years with only a few exceptions, but since then it has been given every year.

Adolphus Hailstork also composed 'Earthrise,' a work for double chorus and orchestra commissioned by the May Festival in 2006 to promote healing following the 2000 riots. The piece featured a white chorus on one side of the risers and an African American chorus on the other side, who by the end form a visual metaphor by interweaving to create a racially harmonic gesture.

May Festival opened its doors to African American singers in 1956.

The all-volunteer May Festival Chorus has been under the direction of Matthew Swanson, former director of the May Festival Youth Chorus, since 2024. The chorus rehearses on Tuesday evenings during the academic year from 7-10pm. The chorus performs regularly with the Cincinnati Symphony and Pops Orchestras, singing at Music Hall (Cincinnati) as well as Riverbend Music Center and has garnered critical acclaim for its high level of performance. The May Festival Chamber Chorus, a smaller group within the Chorus, performs at various community concerts throughout the year.

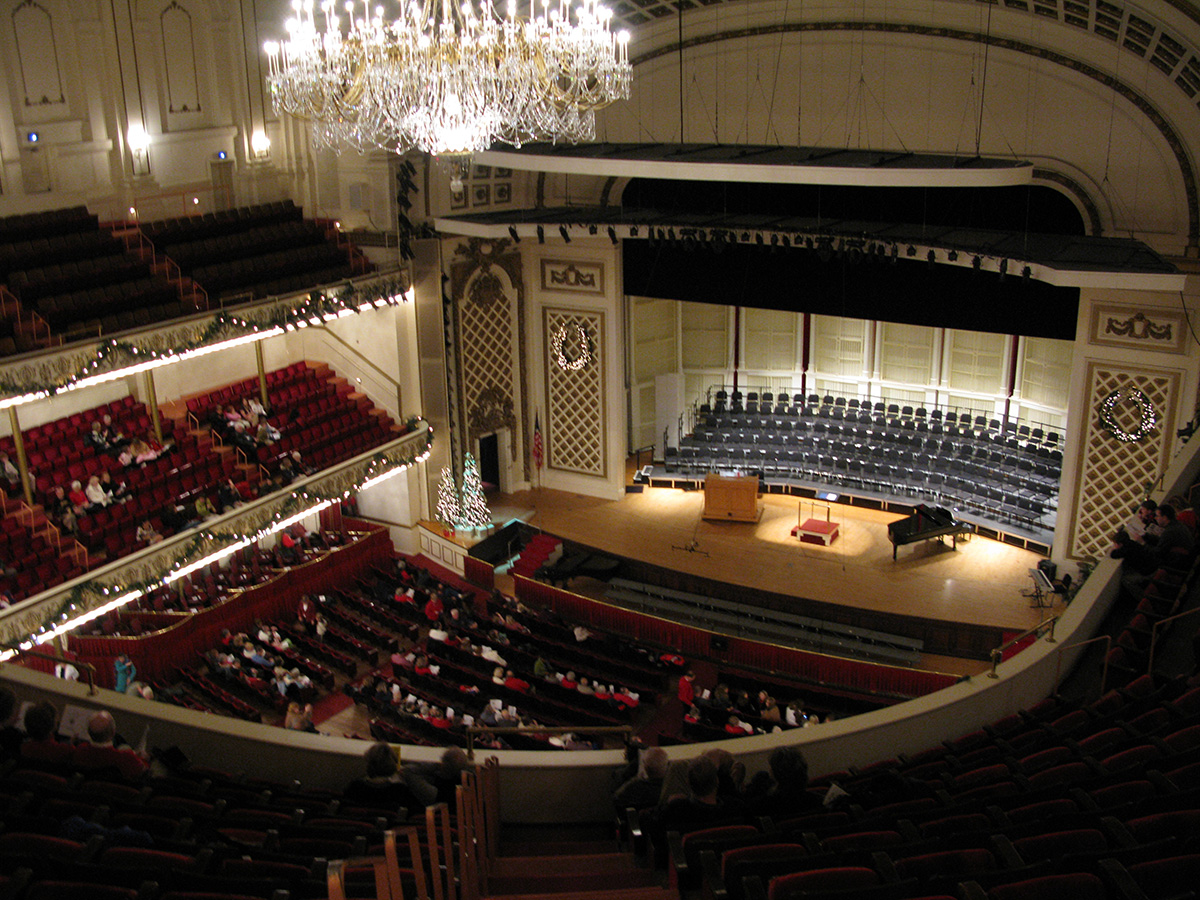
Music Hall Springer Auditorium

In addition, in 1986 the May Festival Youth Chorus was formed. Made up of youth from area high-schools, the MFYC is conducted by Jason Alexander Holmes and gives its members (who must audition competitively) the opportunity to perform challenging music well above the average high school level. The MFYC also has the opportunity to perform with the adult May Festival throughout the year, most notably during May Festival.

On 5 December 2017, the Cincinnati May Festival canceled conductor James Levine’s appearance in May 2018, after he was accused by four males of sexual abuse.

Since 12 March 2020, all concerts were cancelled and virtual ones were held due to the COVID-19 pandemic. All concerts have since returned to in person.

== Music Directors and Chorus Masters ==
Music Directors (Note: In 1952, Thor Johnson, Jean Morel and Fritz Stiedry were guest conductors. No "Music Director" was designated.) (Note: In 1965, Stanislaw Skrowaczewski and Robert Shaw were guest conductors. No "Music Director" was designated.)

- Theodore Thomas (1873–1904)
- Frank van der Stucken (1906–1912)
- Ernst Kunwald (1914–1916)
- Eugène Ysaÿe (1918–1920)
- Frank van der Stucken (1923–1927)
- Frederick Stock 1929
- Eugene Aynsley Goossens (1931–1946)
- Fritz Busch (1948–1950)
- Josef Krips (1954–1960)
- Max Rudolf (1963; 1967–1970)
- Julius Rudel (1971–1972)
- Leonard Bernstein 1973 (Honorary Music Director)
- James Levine (1974–1978)
- James Conlon (1979–2016)

Principal Conductor

- Juanjo Mena (2017–2023)

Chorus Masters (Note: For some Festivals, no chorus master was designated. An "assistant music director" was designated instead.)

- Carl Barus (1873, 1882)
- Otto Singer (1875°, 1878°, 1880°)
- Arthur Mees (1882, 1886°)
- Edwin Glover (1884, 1898, 1900, 1902, 1904)
- Louis Ehrgott (1888, 1890, 1918)
- W. L. Blumenschein (1892, 1894, 1896)
- Alfred Hartzel (1908, 1910, 1912, 1914°, 1916°, 1920, 1922, 1925, 1927, 1929, 1931, 1933, 1935, 1937, 1939, 1941, 1944)
- Sherwood Kains (1946, 1948)
- Willis Beckett (1950, 1952, 1954, 1956, 1958, 1960)
- Robert Knauf (1963, 1965, 1967, 1968, 1969)
- Elmer Thomas (1970–1973; 1975)
- Earl Rivers (Acting) 1974
- Thomas Peck (1976–1978)
- John Leman (1979–1988)
- John H. Williams 1989
- Robert Porco (1990–2024)
- Matthew Swanson (2024-)

Between 1905 and 1946, music directors of the Cincinnati Symphony Orchestra (founded in 1895) also were engaged as music director of the biannual choral festival (Frank Van der Stucken, Ernst Kunwald, Eugène Ysaÿe, Fritz Reiner, and Eugene Goosens held the reins during those years). Fritz Busch and Josef Krips led festivals between 1948 and 1960.

With the appointment of Max Rudolf as director of the festival in 1963, the festival became an annual event in 1967, as it is today. In the 1970s, the centennial of both the festival (1973) and Music Hall (1978) was celebrated with the tenures of Julius Rudel (director from 1971 to 1973) and James Levine (1974 to 1978). James Conlon became director in 1979.

When Leonard Bernstein conducted the festival in its centennial year, he ascribed the true strength of the endeavor with his typical aplomb:

One of the most valuable features of Cincinnati's festival as I see it is that it preserves the involvement of the community chorus…. I don't know how the May Festival does it! … I'm filled with admiration at what they accomplish.
