= Internment of German Americans =

Detention during both World Wars

German American internment
- Part of the United States home front during World War II
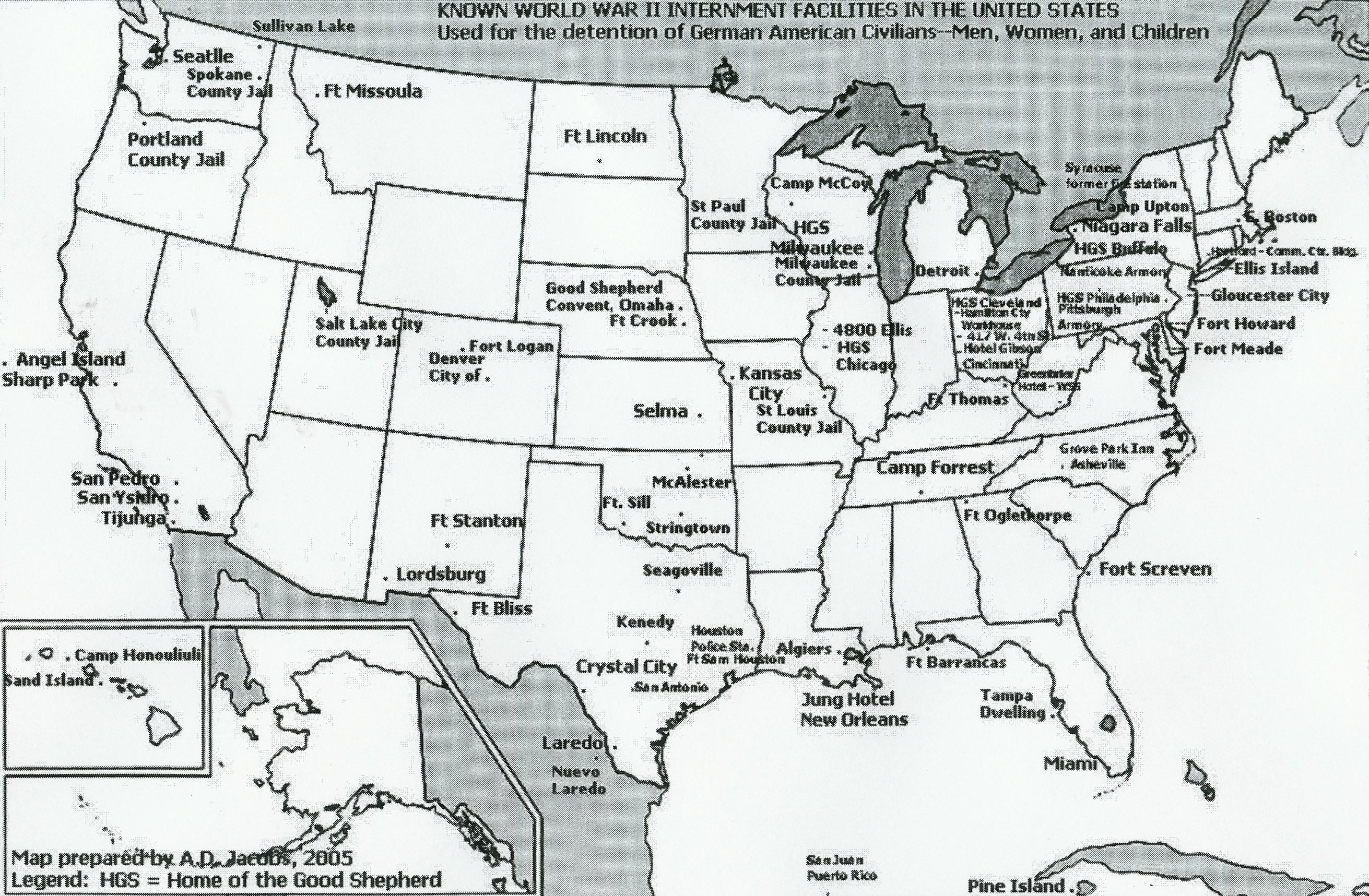
- Locations of internment camps for German enemy aliens during World War II
- Date: 1917–1919; 1941–1948
- Location: United States

Internment of German resident aliens and German-American citizens occurred in the United States during the periods of World War I and World War II. During World War II, the legal basis for this detention was under Presidential Proclamation 2526, made by President Franklin D. Roosevelt under the authority of the Alien Enemies Act.

With the U.S. entry into World War I after Germany's unrestricted submarine warfare, as well as the Zimmermann telegram, German nationals were automatically classified as enemy aliens. Two of four main World War I-era internment camps were located in Hot Springs, North Carolina, and Fort Oglethorpe, Georgia. Attorney General A. Mitchell Palmer wrote that "All aliens interned by the government are regarded as enemies, and their property is treated accordingly."

By the time of WWII, the United States had a large population of ethnic Germans. Among residents of the United States in 1940, more than 1.2 million persons had been born in Germany, 5 million had two native-German parents, and 6 million had one native-German parent. Many more had distant German ancestry. Between 1940 and 1948, the United States detained at least 11,507 German Americans (excluding thousands of voluntary Internees, many of whom were children) and 4,058 German Latin Americans. The adults were overwhelmingly permanent residents who had not completed naturalization, while most of the children interned with their parents were U.S. born. The government examined the cases of German nationals individually, and detained relatively few in internment camps run by the Department of Justice, as related to its responsibilities under the Alien Enemies Act. To a much lesser extent, some ethnic German US citizens were classified as suspect after due process and also detained. Similarly, a small proportion of Italian nationals and Italian Americans were interned in relation to their total population in the US. The United States had allowed immigrants from both Germany and Italy to become naturalized citizens, which many had done by then.

In the early 21st century, Congress considered legislation to study treatment of European Americans during WWII, but it did not pass the House of Representatives. Activists and historians have identified certain injustices against these groups. Unlike Italian Americans and Japanese Americans, German American internees have never received financial compensation or an official apology for these events.

== World War I ==
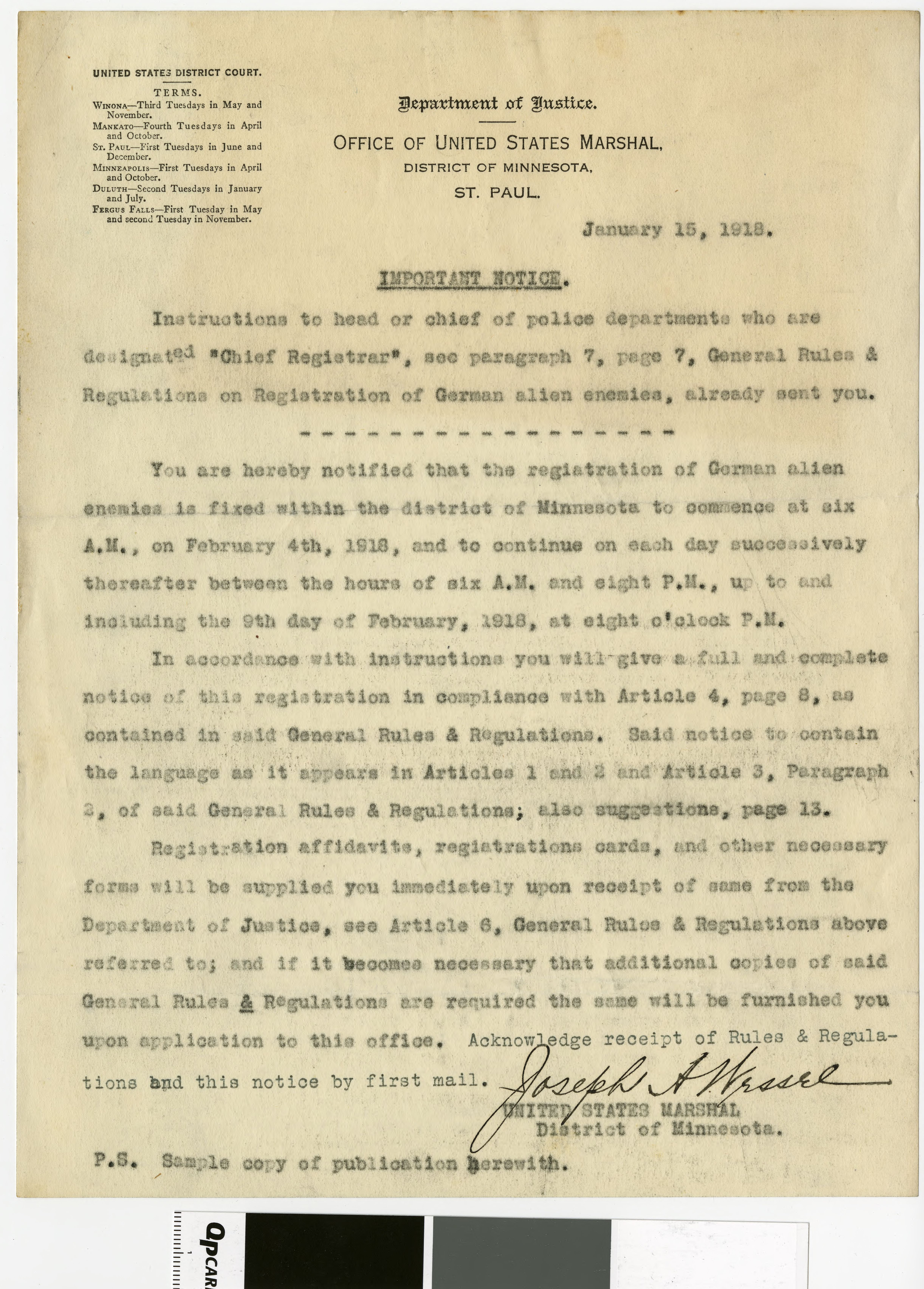
Instructions regarding the registration of German alien enemies, dated January 15, 1918

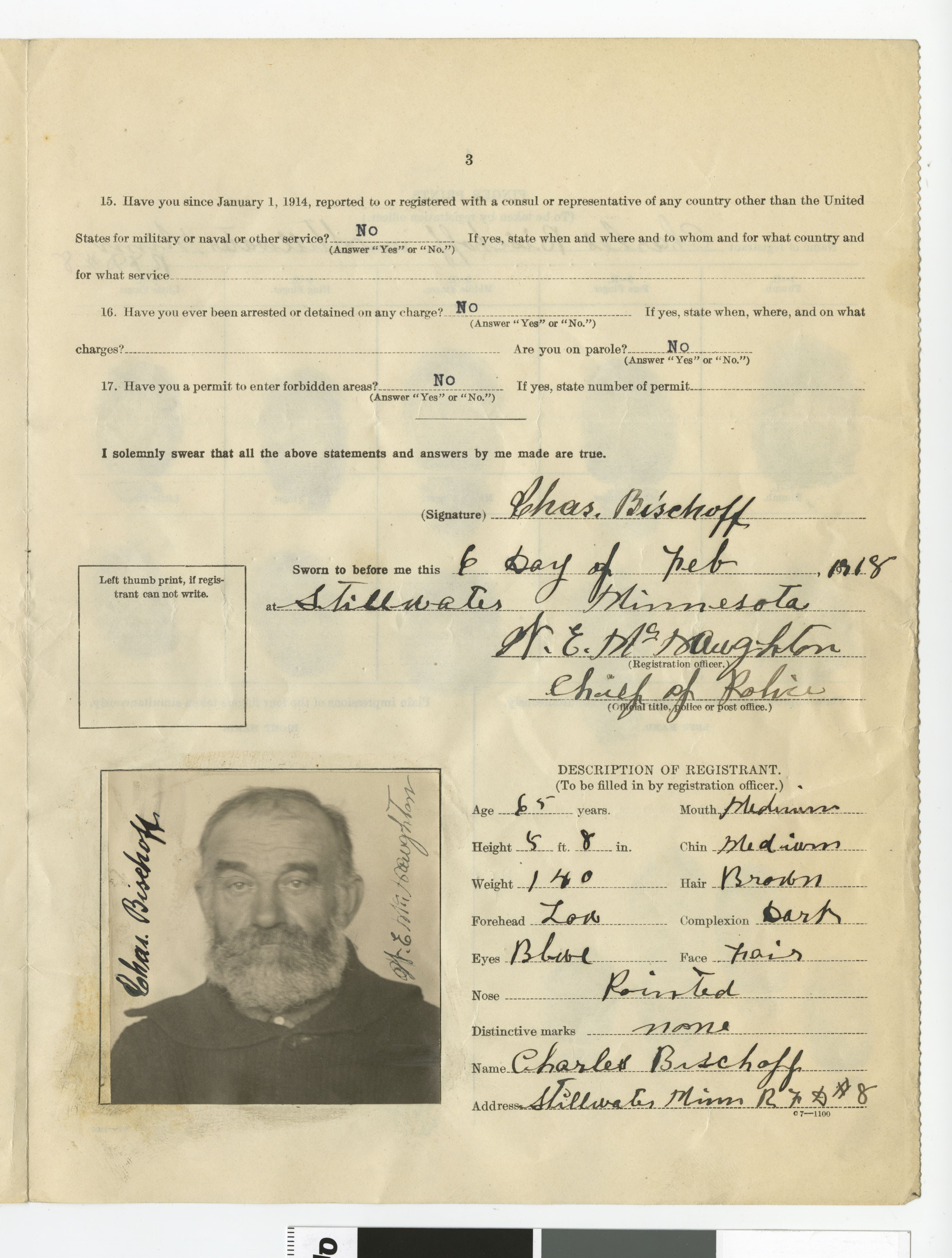
Excerpted page of the German alien enemy registration for Charles Bischoff of Stillwater, Minnesota

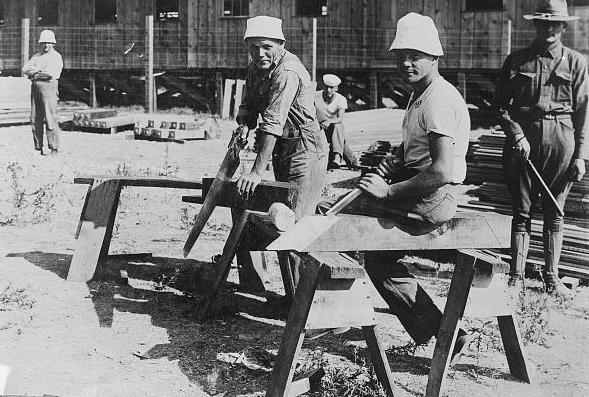
Germans building barracks in an internment camp during World War I

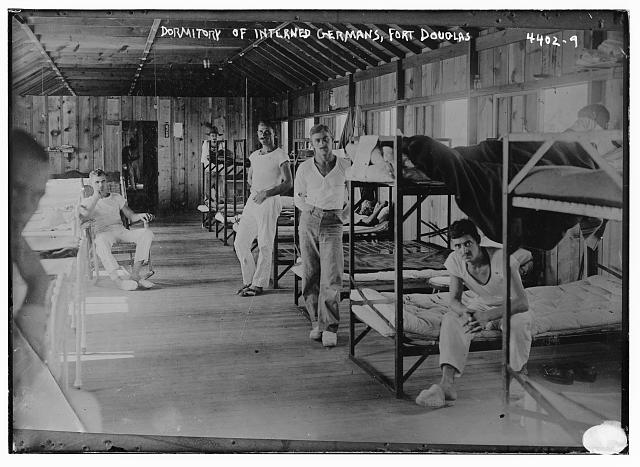
Several Germans in an internment camp at Fort Douglas during World War I

=== Civilian internees ===
President Woodrow Wilson issued two sets of regulations on April 6, 1917, and November 16, 1917, imposing restrictions on German-born male residents of the United States over the age of 14. The rules were written to include natives of Germany who had become citizens of countries other than the U.S.; all were classified as aliens. Some 250,000 people in that category were required to register at their local post office, to carry their registration card at all times, and to report any change of address or employment. The same regulations and registration requirements were imposed on females on April 18, 1918. Some 6,300 such aliens were arrested. Thousands were interrogated and investigated. A total of 2,048 (0.8%) were incarcerated for the remainder of the war in two camps, Fort Douglas, Utah, for those west of the Mississippi, and Fort Oglethorpe, Georgia, for those east of the Mississippi.

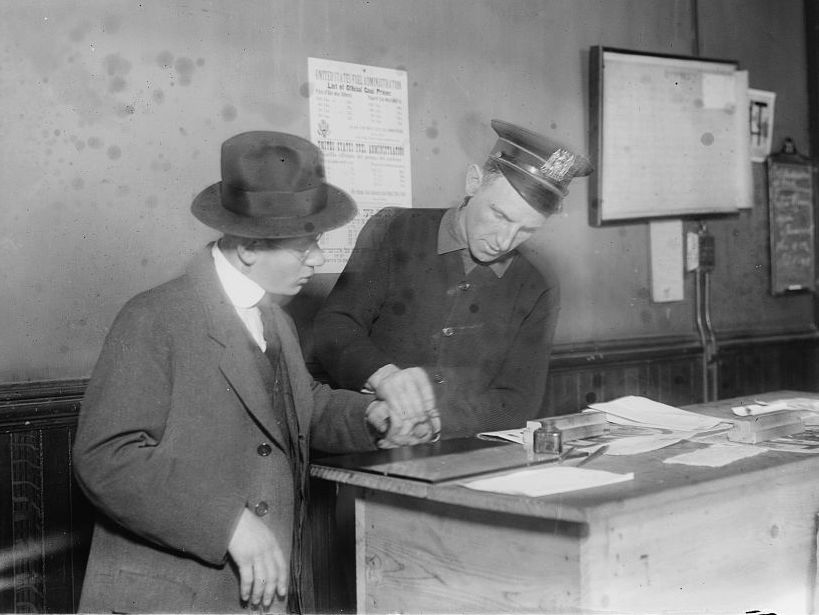
A New York City Police officer fingerprinting a German in 1917

The cases of these aliens, whether being considered for internment or under internment, were managed by the Enemy Alien Registration Section of the Department of Justice. From December 1917 this section was headed by J. Edgar Hoover, then not yet 23 years old.

Among the notable internees were the Jewish geneticist Richard Goldschmidt and 29 players from the Boston Symphony Orchestra (BSO). After being falsely accused by unscrupulous newspaper editor John R. Rathom of knowingly refusing a request to play The Star Spangled Banner, the BSO's conductor, Karl Muck, also spent more than a year interned at Fort Oglethorpe, as did Ernst Kunwald, the music director of the Cincinnati Symphony Orchestra. One internee described a memorable concert in the mess hall packed with 2,000 internees, with honored guests such as their doctors and government censors on the front benches, facing 100 musicians. Under Muck's baton, he wrote, "the Eroica rushed at us and carried us far away and above war and worry and barbed wire."

Most internees were paroled in June 1919 on the orders of Attorney General A. Mitchell Palmer. Others remained interned until as late as March and April 1920.

=== Merchant marine vessels ===
Until the U.S. declared war on Germany, German commercial vessels and their crews were not detained. In January 1917, there were 54 such vessels in mainland U.S. ports and one in San Juan, Puerto Rico, free to leave. With the declaration of war, 1,800 merchant sailors became prisoners of war.

Over 2,000 German officers and sailors were interned in Hot Springs, North Carolina, on the grounds of the Mountain Park Hotel.

=== Military internees ===
Before the U.S. entered the war, several Imperial German Navy vessels were docked in U.S. ports; officials ordered them to leave within 24 hours or submit to detention. The crews were first treated as alien detainees and then as prisoners of war (POWs). In December 1914 the German auxiliary cruiser Cormoran, pursued by the Imperial Japanese Navy, tried to take on provisions and refuel in Guam. When denied what he required, the commanding officer accepted internment as enemy aliens rather than return to sea without sufficient fuel. The ship's guns were disabled. Most of the crew lived on board, since there were no housing facilities available. During the several years the Germans were detainees, they outnumbered U.S. Marines in Guam. Relations were cordial, and a U.S. Navy nurse married one of the Cormoran's officers.

As a result of U-boat attacks on U.S. shipping to Europe, the U.S. broke off diplomatic relations with Germany on February 4, 1917. U.S. officials in Guam then imposed greater restrictions on the German detainees. Those who had moved to quarters on land returned to the ship. Following the U.S. declaration of war on Germany in April 1917, the Americans demanded "the immediate and unconditional surrender of the ship and personnel." The German captain and his crew blew up the ship, taking several German lives. Six whose bodies were found were buried in the U.S. Naval Cemetery in Apra with full military honors. The surviving 353 German service members became prisoners of war, and on April 29 were shipped to the U.S. mainland.

Non-German crewmen were treated differently. Four Chinese nationals started work as personal servants in the homes of wealthy locals. Another 28, Melanesians from German New Guinea, were confined on Guam and denied the rations and monthly allowance that other POWs received. The crews of the cruiser Geier and an accompanying supply ship, which sought refuge from the Imperial Japanese Navy in Honolulu in November 1914, were similarly interned, becoming POWs when the US entered the war.

Several hundred men on two other German cruisers, the Prinz Eitel Friedrich and Kronprinz Wilhelm, unwilling to face certain destruction by the Royal Navy in the Atlantic, lived for several years on their ships in various Virginia ports and frequently enjoyed shore leave. Eventually they were given a strip of land in the Norfolk Navy Yard on which to build accommodations. They constructed a complex commonly known as the "German village", with painted one-room houses and fenced yards made from scrap lumber, curtained windows, and gardens of flowers and vegetables, as well as a village church, a police station, and cafes serving non-alcoholic beverages. They rescued animals from other ships and raised goats and pigs in the village, along with numerous pet cats and dogs. On October 1, 1916, the ships and their personnel were moved to the Philadelphia Navy Yard along with the village structures, which again became known locally as the "German village". In this more secure location in the Navy Yard behind a barbed wire fence, the detainees designated February 2, 1917, as Red Cross Day and solicited donations to the German Red Cross. As German-American relations worsened in the spring of 1917, nine sailors successfully escaped detention, prompting Secretary of the Navy Josephus Daniels to act immediately on plans to transfer the other 750 to detention camps at Fort McPherson and Fort Oglethorpe in late March 1917, where they were isolated from civilian detainees. Following the U.S. declaration of war on Imperial Germany, some of the Cormoran's crew members were sent to McPherson, while others were held at Fort Douglas, Utah, for the duration of the war.

== World War II ==
In the 1940 US census, some 1,237,000 persons identified as being of German birth; 5 million persons had both parents born in Germany; and 6 million persons had at least one parent born in Germany. German immigrants had not been prohibited from becoming naturalized United States citizens and many did so. The large number of German Americans of recent connection to Germany, and their resulting political and economical influence, have been considered the reason they were spared large-scale relocation and internment.

Shortly after the Japanese strike on Pearl Harbor, some 1,260 German nationals were detained and arrested, as the government had been watching them. Of the 254 persons not of Japanese ancestry evicted from coastal areas, the majority were ethnic German. During WWII, German nationals and German Americans in the US were detained and/or evicted from coastal areas on an individual basis. Although the War Department (now the Department of Defense) considered mass expulsion of ethnic Germans and ethnic Italians from the East or West coast areas for reasons of military security, it did not follow through with this. The numbers of people involved would have been overwhelming to manage.

At least 11,507 people of German ancestry (excluding German Latin Americans) were documented as internees during the war, comprising 36.1% of the total internees under the US Justice Department's Enemy Alien Control Program. This number does not include individuals (including thousands of children) who voluntarily joined their families in the camps, including those who reunified at the Crystal City Alien Enemy Detention Facility.

=== Deportation of Germans from Latin America ===
In addition, the US accepted more than 4,500 German nationals deported from Latin America, detaining them in DOJ camps. During the early years of the war, the Federal Bureau of Investigation had drafted a list of Germans in fifteen Latin American countries whom it suspected of subversive activities. Following the Japanese attack on Pearl Harbor, the US demanded deportation of these suspects for detention on US soil. The countries that responded expelled 4,058 people. Some 10% to 15% were Nazi Party members, including approximately a dozen who were recruiters for the NSDAP/AO, which acted as the overseas arm of the Nazi party. Just eight of them were suspected of espionage.

The U.S. internment camps that held Germans from Latin America included:

- Texas
  - Crystal City
  - Kenedy
  - Seagoville
- Florida
  - Camp Blanding
- Oklahoma
  - Stringtown
- North Dakota
  - Fort Lincoln
- Tennessee
  - Camp Forrest

Some internees were held as late as 1948.

=== Studies and review ===
Since the late 20th century, detainees from the DOJ camps began to work to gain recognition of their trials. US citizens of ethnic European groups (German and Italian) which had been considered enemy aliens during the war, and some of those aliens argued that their civil rights had been violated and asked for reparations.

In 2005, activists formed an organization called the German American Internee Coalition to publicize the "internment, repatriation and exchange of civilians of German ethnicity" during World War II. It is seeking U.S. government review and acknowledgment of civil rights violations.

The TRACES Center for History and Culture, based in St. Paul, Minnesota, travels the United States in a "bus-eum" to educate citizens about treatment of foreign nationals in the U.S. during World War II.

Legislation was introduced in the United States Congress in 2001 to create an independent commission to review government policies on European enemy ethnic groups during the war. On August 3, 2001, Senators Russell Feingold (D-WI) and Charles Grassley (R-IA) sponsored the European Americans and Refugees Wartime Treatment Study Act in the U.S. Senate, joined by Senator Ted Kennedy (D-MA) and Senator Joseph Lieberman. This bill created an independent commission to review U.S. government policies directed against German and Italian aliens during World War II in the U.S. and Latin America.

In 2007, the U.S. Senate passed the Wartime Treatment Study Act, which would examine the treatment of ethnic groups targeted by the U.S. government during World War II. Alabama Senator Jeff Sessions opposed it, citing historians from the U.S. Holocaust Memorial Museum who called it an exaggerated response to treatment of enemy aliens. In 2009, the House Judiciary Subcommittee on Immigration, Citizenship, Refugees, Border Security, and International Law passed the Wartime Treatment Study Act by a vote of 9 to 1, but it was not voted on by the full house and did not become law.

== See also ==
- American propaganda during World War II
- Anti-German sentiment
- Arizona during World War II
- German prisoners of war in the United States
- History of homeland security in the United States
- Italian American internment
- Italian Canadian internment
- Japanese American internment
- Japanese Canadian internment
- List of World War II prisoner-of-war camps in the United States
- Ukrainian Austrian internment
- Ukrainian Canadian internment

== Sources ==
=== World War I ===
- Charles Burdick, The Frustrated Raider: The Story of the German Cruiser Cormoran in World War I (Carbondale, IL: Southern Illinois University Press, 1979)
- Gerald H. Davis, "'Oglesdorf': A World War I Internment Camp in America," Yearbook of German-American Studies, v. 26 (1991), 249–65
- William B. Glidden, "Internment Camps in America, 1917–1920," Military Affairs, v. 37 (1979), 137–41
- Paul Halpern, A Naval History of World War I (1994)
- Arnold Krammer, Undue Process: The Untold Story of America's German Alien Internees (NY: Rowman & Littlefield, 1997), ISBN 0-8476-8518-7
- Reuben A. Lewis, "How the United States Takes Care of German Prisoners," in Munsey's Magazine, v. 64 (June–September, 1918), 137ff., Google books, accessed April 2, 2011
- Jörg Nagler, "Victims of the Home Front: Enemy Aliens in the United States during World War I," in Panakos Panayi, ed., Minorities in Wartime: National and Racial Groupings in Europe, North America and Australia during the Two World Wars (1993)
- Erich Posselt, "Prisoner of War No. 3598 [Fort Oglethorpe]," in American Mercury, May–August 1927, 313–23, Google books, accessed April 2, 2011
- Paul Schmalenbach, German Raiders: A History of Auxiliary Cruisers of the German Navy, 1895–1945 (Annapolis, MD: Naval Institute Press, 1979)

=== World War II ===
- John Christgau, "Enemies": World War II Alien Internment (Ames, IA: Iowa State University Press, 1985), ISBN 0-595-17915-0
- Kimberly E. Contag and James A. Grabowska, Where the Clouds Meet the Water (Inkwater Press, 2004), ISBN 1-59299-073-8. Journey of the German Ecuadorian widower, Ernst Contag, and his four children from their home in the South American Andes to Nazi Germany in 1942.
- John Joel Culley, "A Troublesome Presence: World War II Internment of German Sailors in New Mexico" in Prologue: Quarterly of the National Archives and Records Administration v. 28 (1996), 279–295
- Heidi Gurcke Donald, We Were Not the Enemy: Remembering the United States Latin-American Civilian Internment Program of World War II (iUniverse, 2007), ISBN 0-595-39333-0
- Stephen Fox, Fear Itself: Inside the FBI Roundup of German Americans during World War II: The Past as Prologue (iUniverse, 2005), ISBN 978-0-595-35168-8
- Timothy J. Holian, The German Americans and WW II: An Ethnic Experience (NY: Peter Lang Publishing, 1996), ISBN 0-8204-4040-X
- Arthur D. Jacobs, The Prison Called Hohenasperg: An American Boy Betrayed by his Government during World War II (Parkland, FL: Universal Publishers, 1999), ISBN 1-58112-832-0
- National Archives: "Brief Overview of the World War II Enemy Alien Control Program", accessed January 19, 2010
- New York Times: Jerre Mangione, "America's Other Internment," May 19, 1978, accessed January 20, 2010. Mangione was special assistant to the United States Commissioner of Immigration and Naturalization from 1942 to 1948.
- Fiset, Louis (2003). "Medical Care for Interned Enemy Aliens: A Role for the US Public Health Service in World War II". American Journal of Public Health. 93 (10): 1644–54. doi:10.2105/ajph.93.10.1644. PMC 1448029. PMID 14534217.
- John Eric Schmitz, "Enemies Among Us: The Relocation, Internment, and Repatriation of German, Italian, and Japanese Americans during World War Two" Ph.D. Dissertation, American University 2007
- John E. Schmitz (2021), Enemies among Us: The Relocation, Internment, and Repatriation of German, Italian, and Japanese Americans during the Second World War, University of Nebraska Press, 2021. ISBN 978-1-4962-3887-0.
- U.S. House of Representatives, Committee on the Judiciary: "Hearing on: the Treatment of Latin Americans of Japanese Descent, European Americans, and Jewish Refugees During World War II," March 19, 2009, accessed January 19, 2010

=== General ===
- Don H. Tolzmann, ed., German-Americans in the World Wars, 5 vols. (New Providence, NJ: K.G. Saur, 1995–1998), ISBN 3-598-21530-4
  - vol. 1: The Anti-German Hysteria of World War One
  - vol. 2: The World War One Experience
  - vol. 3: Research on the German-American Experience of World War One
  - vol. 4: The World War Two Experience: the Internment of German-Americans
    - section 1: From Suspicion to Internment: U.S. government policy toward German-Americans, 1939–48
    - section 2: Government Preparation for and implementation of the repatriation of German-Americans, 1943–1948
    - section 3: German-American Camp Newspapers: Internees View of Life in Internment
  - vol. 5: Germanophobia in the U.S.: The Anti-German Hysteria and Sentiment of the World Wars. Supplement and Index.
