= Wartime Treatment Study Act =

The Wartime Treatment Study Act is federal U.S. legislation which would examine the treatment of European Americans, European Latin Americans, and Jewish refugees during World War II in America. Lead sponsors include Russ Feingold and Charles Grassley. The bill passed in the U.S. Senate in 2007, and in the House Judiciary Subcommittee on Immigration, Citizenship, Refugees, Border Security, and International Law in 2009 but did not become law.

== Reactions ==
Critics from the U.S. Holocaust Memorial Museum argue the legislation is exaggerated despite contradictory findings.
