= Fort Oglethorpe (prisoner-of-war camp) =

Coordinates: 34°56′58.75″N 85°15′10.66″W

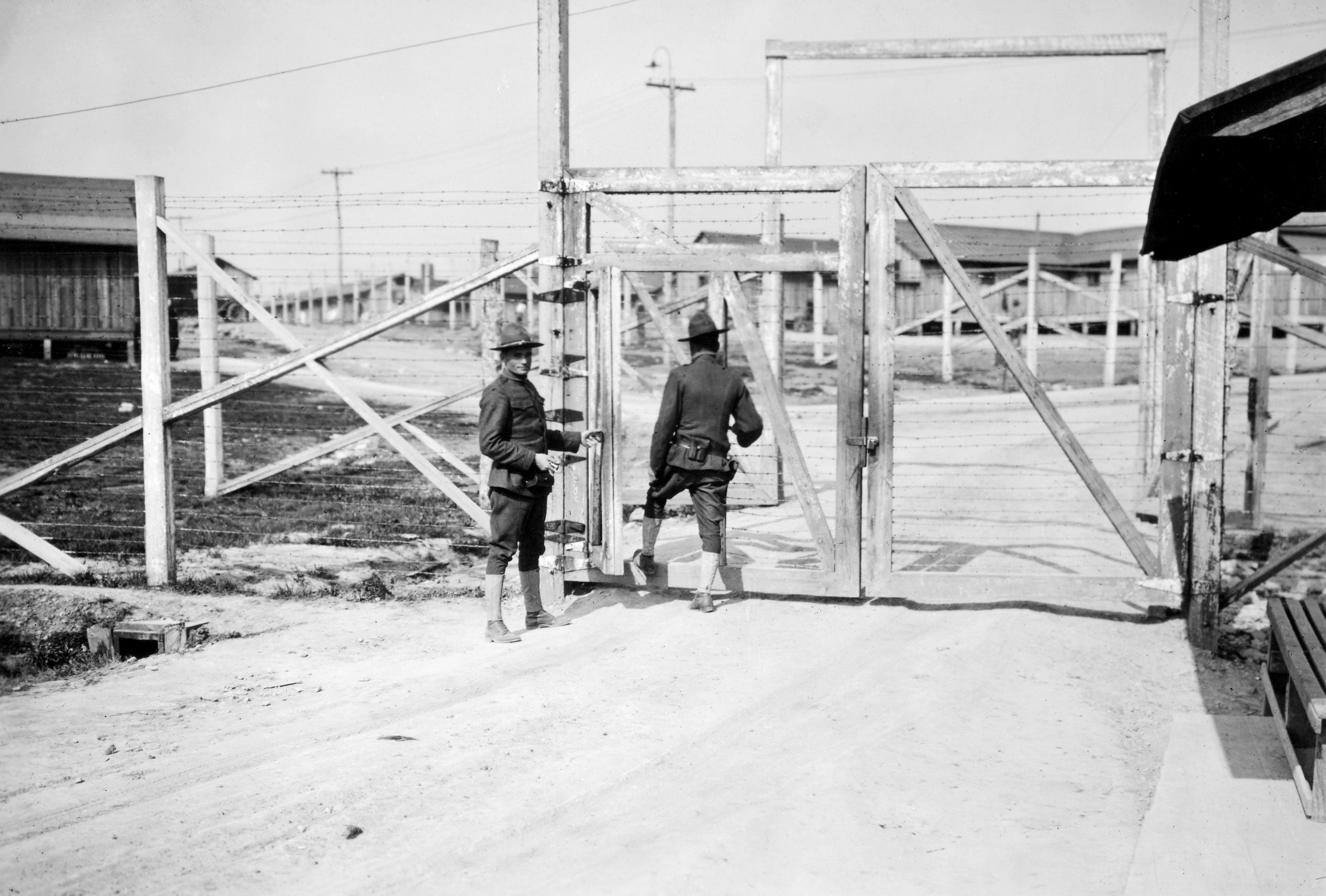
Gates at the entrance to the Fort Oglethorpe POW camp (May 1919)

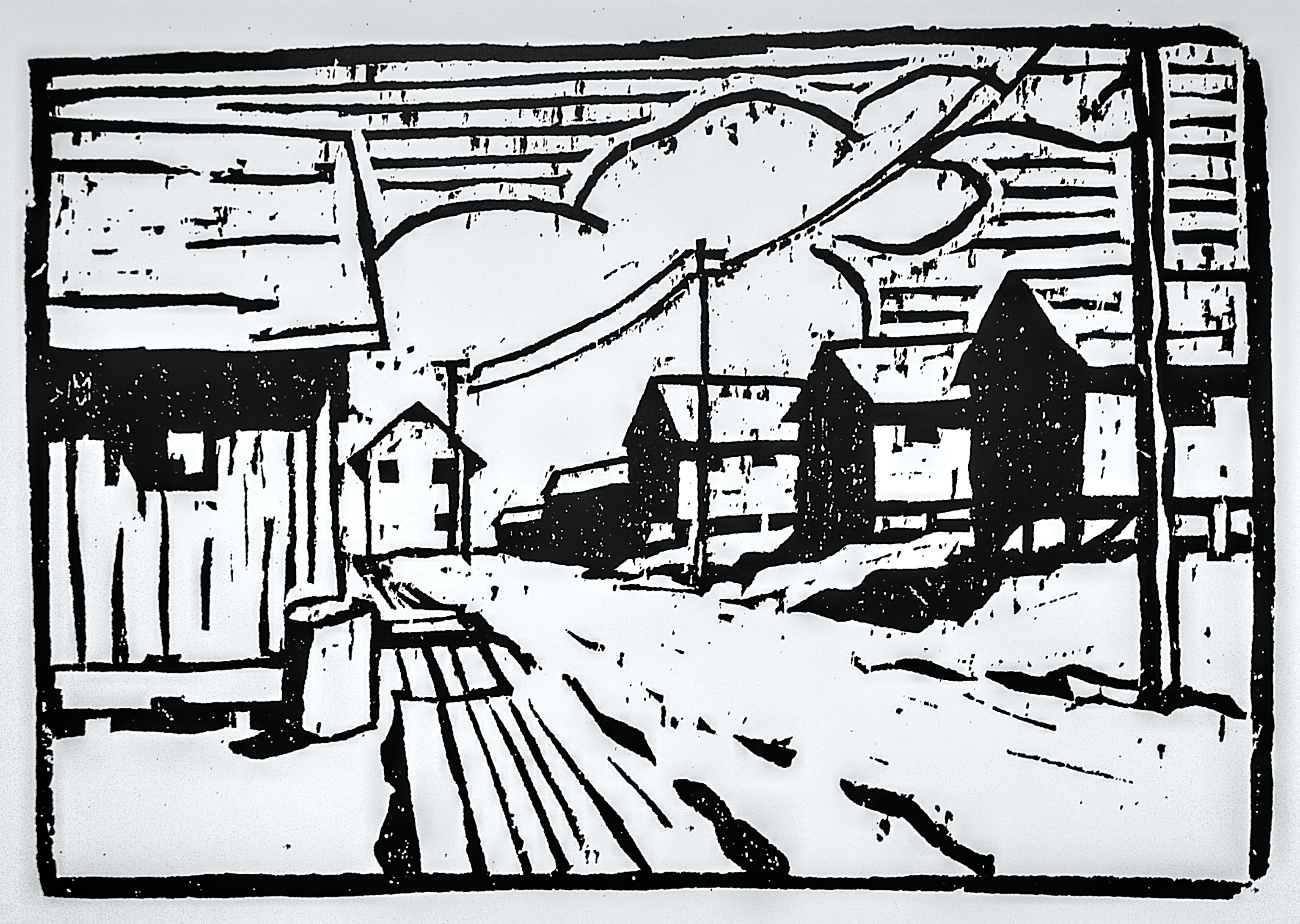
Memorial at Andersonville National Historic Site

Fort Oglethorpe, Georgia (German: Orgelsdorf) was a German-American internment camp in Catoosa County, Georgia, during and after World War I. Facilities at the fort were used to detain some 4,000 enemy military personnel, prisoners of war, and civilian internees arrested under the Alien and Sedition Acts, between 1917 and 1920. After it was deactivated in 1947, the Camp's facilities formed the basis for the present day town of Fort Oglethorpe, Georgia.

== Camp description ==
"The War Prison Camp of Fort Oglethorpe consisted of a huge, somewhat hilly plot of land approximately a mile square. The entire area was surrounded by two barbed-wire fences, about ten feet high." Tripod watch towers were located outside the barbed wire perimeter. Each tower was equipped with a search light, telephone and machine-gun.

The camp was divided into two component parts. Camp A, the "millionaire's camp," housed wealthy prisoners in private rooms who paid for their own food, and also retained cooks and servants recruited from the stewards and sailors of the German maritime fleet. Camp B consisted of some thirty barracks which housed the majority of the 4,000 prisoners. It was dominated by an immense mess-hall.

== Prisoners, military and civilian ==
The military prisoners included crews from the German raiders SS Prinz Eitel Friedrich, SS Kronprinz Wilhelm and the British-origin/German-seized steamship SS Appam. The civilian internees included businessmen denounced by their American commercial rivals, and individuals of German, Czech, Polish and other nationalities charged with a variety of offenses under the Espionage Act of 1917.

Prominent prisoners included Count Albrecht von Montgelas, Dr. Karl Muck, conductor of the Boston Symphony Orchestra, Dr. Ernst Kunwald, conductor of the Cincinnati Symphony Orchestra, Professor Richard Benedict Goldschmidt, biologist Dr. Isaac Strauss, and Professor Zenneck. Dr. Karl Muck was falsely accused by unscrupulous newspaper editor John R. Rathom of having refused a request to perform "The Star-Spangled Banner" in an October 1917 concert. Despite having been unaware of the request at the time and always ending future concerts with America's national anthem, Theodore Roosevelt and many other US citizens believed the accusations and were furious with Muck, who was accordingly was arrested and interned at Fort Ogelthorpe until he agreed to be deported in the summer of 1919. Dr. Kunwald was arrested as being an "enemy alien"; a citizen of Austria-Hungary. He was held at Fort Oglethorpe for a year before being deported to the First Austrian Republic. Agreeing to deportation was the one condition of Kunwald being set free from the camp. Professor Goldschmidt was arrested due to his German citizenship; he was not released until after the war. Dr. Isaac Strauss was a German spy who was arrested at the beginning of the war. He was allegedly part of a German Jewish spy organization. Professor Zenneck was arrested for allegedly being a German radio spy. His activities made him extremely feared by the US government.

Prisoners were separated by several categories. First were those openly or suspected to be supportive of the Imperial German or Austro-Hungarian war effort. Other prisoners were interned for espionage, sabotage, or merely on suspicion of making pro-Central Powers statements. Another group were "Prisoners of War," Imperial German Navy sailors and merchant seamen in the US when World War I began. Lastly were the group nicknamed "trouble-makers." These included those considered Far Left political radicals and members of Industrial Workers of the World (I.W.W.). Often these different groups would clash due to loyalty questions. This tended to be particularly true between "Prisoners of War" and internees supportive of the American war effort. This led to the need to separate camps. The intellectual and cultural elite remained interned at Fort Oglethorpe, while the rest were separated among other prisons.

The wealthiest prisoners at Fort Oglethorpe had benefits above the other internees. Because of their wealth, they could pay for better housing in another compound. They were also not required to perform labor or could hire other internees to do it for them.

== Daily life and activities ==
Daily life was strictly regulated. The bugle sounded at 5:30 AM, roll call took place at 6:30, followed by breakfast. The bugle sounded again at twelve noon for mess while the period from 1PM to 3PM was declared a rest period. Another roll call followed at 5:30 and after dinner the prisoners were free to pursue their own activities.

Other activities also took place. Moving pictures were provided twice weekly. Education possibilities were available. Remedial instruction was available to the non-wealthy prisoners. The courses of the camp "University" included lectures in Spanish, Portuguese, Russian, Chinese, Arabic, Hebrew, Malay as well as courses in biology (Professor Goldschmidt), physiology (Dr. Isaac Strauss), electronics (Professor Zenneck) and art (Count Montgelas). Musical events were a prominent part of camp life. On one memorable occasion, Dr. Karl Muck conducted a performance of Beethoven's Eroica symphony. ("Dr. Muck had sworn he would never conduct again in America, but we convinced him that Fort Oglethorpe was really Germany, and so he gave in"). Other activities included chess, pinochle, association football, handball, reading, carpentry, walking, and writing letters and cards to family members, members of the U.S. Congress and the U.S. Department of Justice.

Prisoners were also allowed to publish the Orgelsdorfer Eulenspiegel, a literary and satirical newspaper, which was often used to slip in comments about the internment camp conditions. One article wrote "Secondary to the influenza more or less than 50 people died- unofficially. All here greater than a short time are more or less crazy-officially."

Prisoners were also allowed to grow vegetables in the prison garden and use them in their food. Non-canned food from family and friends and foods from the Prison Exchange could also be used.

== Illnesses, deaths and escapes ==
The illnesses included tuberculosis, instances of going stir crazy, and influenza. Tuberculosis patients were isolated in a tent and put on what was described as an unpalatable diet. The cases of insanity in a population of 4,000 included "dozens and dozens of men" who were transferred to St. Elizabeth's Asylum for the Insane in Washington, D.C. The 1918 influenza pandemic was "perhaps the most ghastly of them all; day and night ambulances rushed through the camp; day and night patient after patient was transported to the hospital....More than half of the inmates became ill." The total number of dead is not provided. The usual escape attempts took place but, as in most such cases, most of the escapees were recaptured. It appears that the one successful escape artist was one "Henckel" who made several unsuccessful attempts but at last succeeded, "and thus probably the only real spy the United States had interned at Oglethorpe disappeared for good."

== Legal aspects of imprisonment ==
The Swiss Embassy represented the German interests and the Swedish Embassy represented those of the Austro-Hungarian Empire. Some of the prisoners performed hard labor on the roads and in the quarry. They were ordered to sign a document that they were doing so of their own free will. Many refused to sign and were locked in a separate camp behind barbed wire. Protests to the Swiss Consul, Dr. Huebscher, were ineffectual; but the Swedish Count Rosen, who represented the Austro-Hungarian prisoners, was able to reverse the decision, "and the prisoners were returned to the main camp and put back on full rations." Otherwise, the treatment of the prisoners was generally fair ("not that we were badly treated") but the prisoners suffered from two major irritants. Letters and cards were heavily censored, and, following the Armistice of November 11, 1918, the prisoners suffered "from the unbearable uncertainty as to the duration of our detention." 2,000 German prisoners and 1,600 civilian internees who agreed to be deported were returned to Germany and the former Austria-Hungarian Empire in June and July 1919.

The remaining prisoners who wished to stay in the United States, perhaps 400 or so, then began a letter writing campaign. "We wrote to the Senators and Congressmen representing the sections of the country we came from. We wrote to all of them, collectively and individually. We wrote to judges, lawyers and hundreds of times to the Department of Justice. Never once did we receive an answer from a Congressman. The Swedish and Swiss Legations stopped answering our letters. The Department of Justice invariably replied that it regretted exceedingly not to be able to release us 'in the immediate future.' How we came to loathe that phrase."

Erich Posselt was interviewed by a representative of the U.S. Justice Department who accused him of having been a passenger on various British vessels, including HMS Hampshire, on which Lord Kitchener died, and thereby aiding and abetting the sinking of Allied ships during the Imperial German Navy's U-boat campaign, charges that Posselt characterized as idiotic. Posselt was finally released on parole on January 12, 1920.

== Internees ==
- Richard Goldschmidt
- Ernst Kunwald
- Karl Muck

== Sources ==
- Erich Posselt, "Prisoner of War No. 3598 [Fort Oglethorpe]," American Mercury, v. 11, no. 43 (July 1927) 313-323.
