= Fort Oglethorpe (Fort Oglethorpe, Georgia) =

U.S. Army base in Georgia, 1902–1946

- Catoosa / Walker counties, Georgia, United States
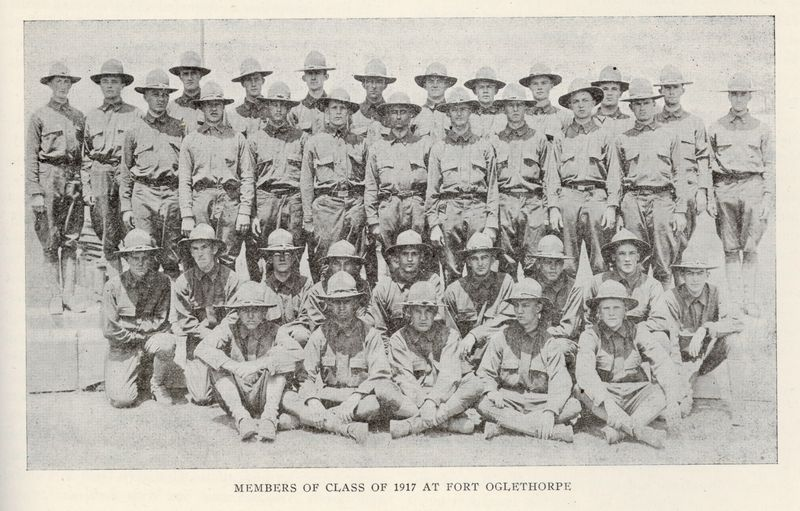
- Members of the UNC Class of 1917 at Fort Oglethorpe, March 1915

Site information
- Owner: Private/Public

Location
- Coordinates: 34°56′58.75″N 85°15′10.66″W

Site history
- In use: 1902–1946

Fort Oglethorpe was a United States Army post in the U.S. state of Georgia.

== History ==
It was established in a 1902 regulation, and received its first contingent in 1904. It served largely as a cavalry post for the 6th Cavalry. During World War I, Fort Oglethorpe housed 4,000 German prisoners of war and civilian detainees. During World War I and World War II, it served as an induction and processing center. During World War II, it was a major training center for the Women's Army Corps.

Originally established with the purchase of 813 acres by the US Government, Fort Oglethorpe also expanded into the territory of the adjacent Chickamauga and Chattanooga National Military Park. (All facilities were removed from the park after the end of WW2, and no evidence remains today.) The Fort was considered to be one of the most modern in the country, and it was used for many things. The Fort saw extensive field-testing of the Bantam Reconnaissance Car, later to be known as the "Jeep." The Fort was also a major factor in the development of various forms of the Mobile Army Surgical Hospital, or "MASH," and the perfection of many medical techniques used in trench warfare. Then-Captain Dwight D. Eisenhower served here for four months in 1917 as an instructor.

In the 1930s, soldiers played polo with Summerfield Johnston Sr. (Summerfield Johnston Jr.'s father), of the Coca-Cola Bottling Company, later known as Coca-Cola Enterprises, at Fort Oglethorpe and on the Johnston farm in McDonald, Tennessee. Polo and other pursuits were considered by the Army to be an important way for soldiers to maintain their riding skills in the years between World Wars 1 and 2, and the Fort hosted both horse shows and national competitions.

The post was declared surplus after World War II and sold. The final flag was lowered at 5:00 PM on December 31, 1946. The majority of the old post formed the nucleus for the present community of Fort Oglethorpe, Georgia. Incorporated in February, 1949, it was the first city to be incorporated in Georgia after World War 2.
