= Karl Muck =

German conductor (1859–1940)

External audio
- Recordings with Karl Muck in the Online Archive of the Österreichische Mediathek

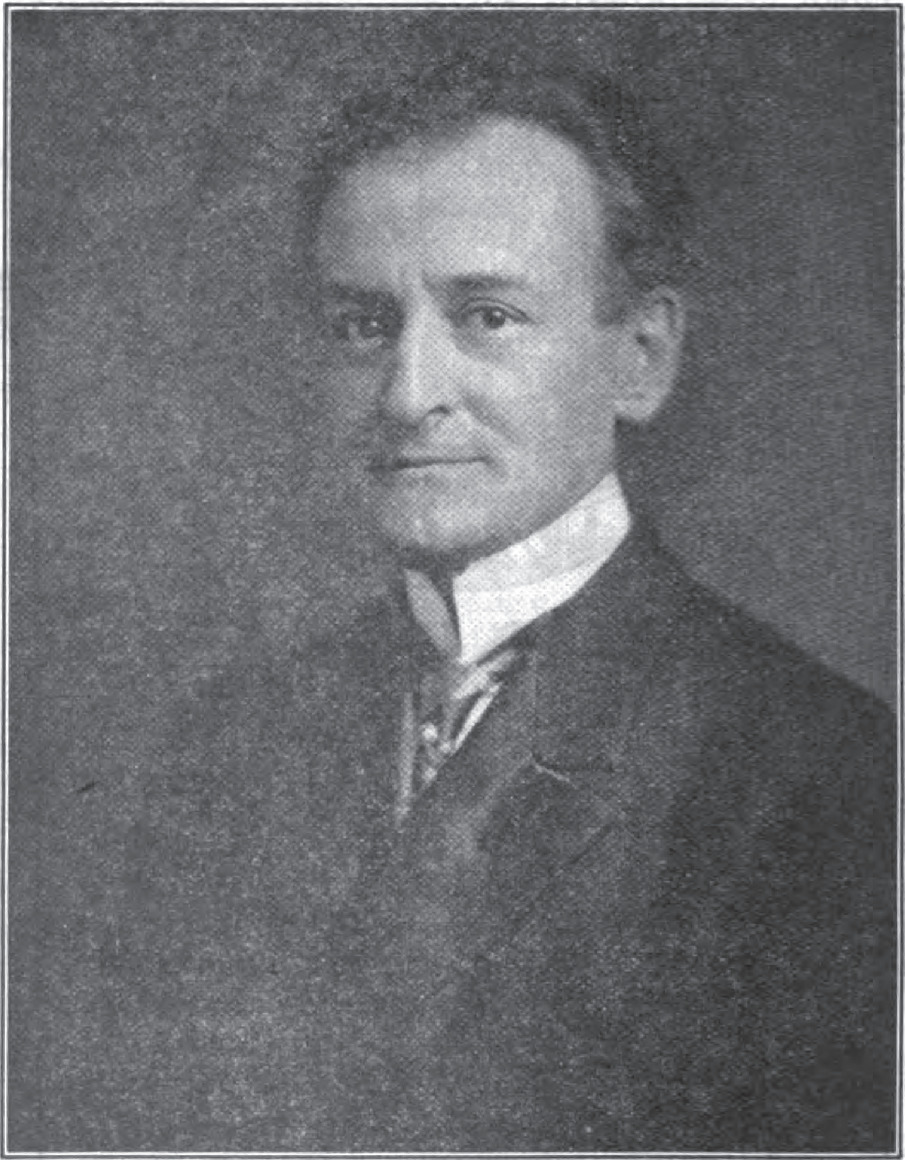
Karl Muck

Karl Muck (October 22, 1859 – March 3, 1940) was a Hessian-born conductor of classical music. He based his activities principally in Europe and mostly in opera. His American career comprised two stints at the Boston Symphony Orchestra (BSO). Muck endured a trial by media in 1917, after Providence Journal editor John R. Rathom falsely accused him of knowingly refusing a request to have the BSO play the Star Spangled Banner following American entry into World War I. Although Muck was a citizen of neutral Switzerland, he was arrested based on Rathom's accusation and incarcerated as an enemy alien at Fort Oglethorpe, a German-American internment camp in Georgia from March 1918 until August 1919. Karl Muck and his wife were then deported from the United States. His later career included notable engagements in Hamburg and at the Bayreuth Festival.

== Early life and career ==
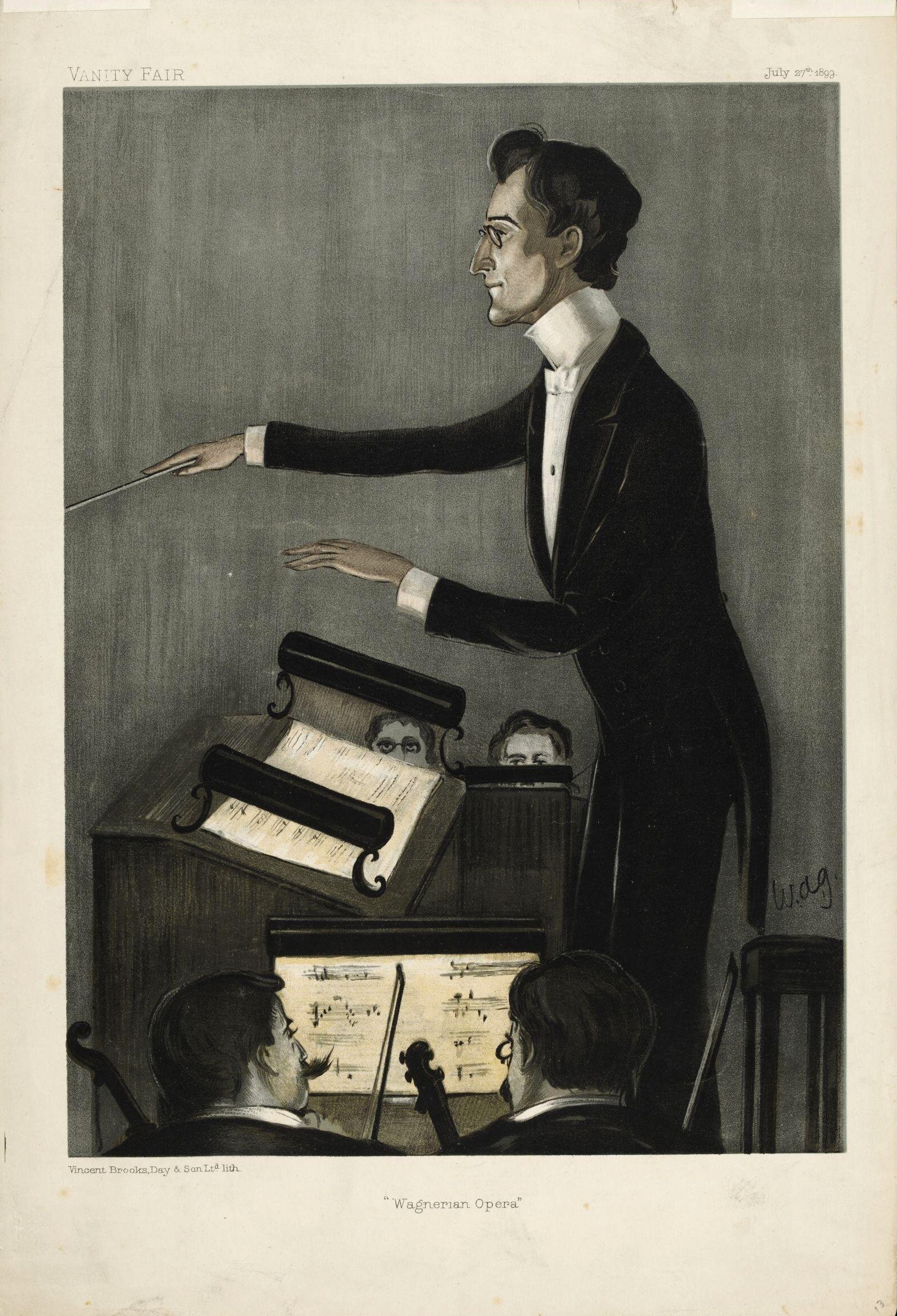
Muck caricatured by WAG for Vanity Fair, 1899

Karl Muck was born in Darmstadt, which was then the capital of the Grand Duchy of Hesse, in modern Germany. Muck's father, a senior court official and amateur musician, moved the family to Switzerland in 1867 and acquired Swiss citizenship. Karl Muck acquired Swiss citizenship when he was 21. Muck studied piano as a child and made his first public appearance at the age of 11 when he gave a piano solo at a chamber music recital. He also played the violin in a local symphony orchestra as a boy. He graduated from the gymnasium at Würzburg and entered the University of Heidelberg at 16. In May 1878 he entered the University of Leipzig, where he took his degree as Doctor of Philosophy in 1880. While there studied music at Leipzig Conservatory. He made his formal debut as a concert pianist on February 19, 1880, at the Leipzig Gewandhaus in Xaver Scharwenka's Piano Concerto No. 1 in B-flat minor with Arthur Nikisch conducting.

He began his conducting career in comparatively minor provincial cities, starting in 1880 as Second Conductor (Zweiter Kapellmeister) in Zurich (Aktientheater), moving to Salzburg (k.k. Theater) in October 1881 as principal conductor (Erster Kapellmeister), where he served until April 1882. He then held appointments in Brünn (Stadttheater: October 1882 to June 1883) and Graz (1884–1886), where he married 21-year-old Anita Portugall on February 3, 1887. His first position in a major musical center came in Prague as principal conductor at Angelo Neumann's Deutsches Landestheater, starting with a performance of Die Meistersinger on August 15, 1886, and ending in June 1892. He also conducted Neumann's traveling opera company, appearing at Berlin and in 1888–1889 conducting Wagner's Ring cycle in Moscow and St. Petersburg. He left Prague to become principal conductor in October 1892 of the Berlin Court Opera (Kgl. Oper — today the Berlin State Opera, where he was appointed Chief Musical Director (Kgl. preußischer Generalmusikdirektor) on August 26, 1908. He remained in Berlin until 1912, conducting 1,071 performances of 103 operas. He also conducted the Royal Orchestra in concerts there.

He took other assignments during his tenure in Berlin. He was guest conductor at the Silesian music festivals in Goerlitz between 1894 and 1911. In May and June 1899 at London's Royal Opera House Covent Garden, he conducted Beethoven's Fidelio and several of Wagner's operas (Tannhäuser, Die Walküre, Die Meistersinger, Der fliegende Höllander and Tristan und Isolde). He devoted many summers to the Wagner Festival in Bayreuth where he became principal conductor in 1903, after serving as a musical assistant since 1892. He succeeded Hermann Levi as the conductor of Parsifal there. As war approached in the summer of 1914, Muck insisted on performing Parsifal on August 1, 1914, to close the festival, which was not revived until 1924. Muck conducted Parsifal at all of the fourteen Bayreuth festivals held between 1901 and 1930, and also conducted Lohengrin there in 1909 and Die Meistersinger in 1925, becoming a close friend of the Wagner family. The American music critic Herbert Peyser (1886-1953) thought Muck's interpretation of Parsifal the greatest he had ever heard: "the only and ultimate Parsifal; the Parsifal in which every phrase was charged with infinities; the Parsifal which was neither of this age nor that age but of all time." He led the Vienna Philharmonic from 1903 to 1906 and the Boston Symphony Orchestra from 1906 to 1918, and took visiting assignments in other cities, including Paris, Madrid, Copenhagen, Brussels.

Muck was offered the Metropolitan Opera House podium in New York at a reputed $27,000 a year, but declined. From 1903 to 1906 he alternated with Felix Mottl as conductor of the Vienna Philharmonic. At the Panama-Pacific International Exhibition held in San Francisco May 14–26, 1915, Muck conducted the Boston Symphony Orchestra in 13 concerts of music of all nations.

== Conducting ==
Solo performers praised his work with them. Artur Schnabel called Muck: "a very great master, whose reliability, maturity and selfless dedication are not equaled by any living artist." Paderewski called him "an ideal accompanist". In physical terms, his conducting style required minimal movement, only small gestures with the tip of his baton. In areas of interpretation he was one of the first modernists. Though old enough to be part of generation known for taking liberties with the score and indulging in flexible tempos, he was by contrast disciplined and direct, less concerned with placing his personal stamp on a score than on demonstrating fidelity to the score and ceding a certain interpretative anonymity. By contrast with his conducting style, orchestra players found him impatient, explosive, nervous, and impulsive. He showed no casual or relaxed side of himself at concerts, rather "he dominated the orchestra and the audience and the occasion." The Austrian conductor Karl Böhm said in a 1972 interview: "Karl Muck by chance heard me direct Lohengrin, and he invited me to study all Wagner's scores with him. He was the first and greatest influence on me ... Muck told me where the orchestra should be more prominent, how to handle the Bayreuth acoustics, and so on."

== Boston, 1906–1918 ==
Muck served as music director of the Boston Symphony Orchestra (BSO) from 1906 to 1908 and then again from 1912 to 1918 (with a yearly salary of 28,000 dollars as the New York Times reported on March 26, 1918). Initially he had to work to expand his repertoire from the operas and German music he concentrated on in Europe. Olin Downes later wrote that "his repertory was unequal to the demands of his audience" so he relied on members of the BSO for coaching in French works. Contemporary works were not his strong suit, though he dutifully programmed music that was not to his own taste, such as the American premiere of Schoenberg's Five Pieces for Orchestra. He also introduced some Sibelius symphonies and many works of Debussy to Boston. Despite his restrained style, he occasionally revealed his romantic side in a work like Liszt's Faust Symphony. On his death the New York Times said that in Boston "he built a virtuoso orchestra."

Why he chose to work in America is unknown. In Berlin he was on close personal terms with Kaiser Wilhelm, but American gossip held that he preferred his freedom and for that reason refused the post of director of the royal opera in Munich in 1911. His life in Boston appeared unremarkable and he guest conducted at the Bayreuth Festival as the conductor of the BSO. Phi Mu Alpha Sinfonia music fraternity made him an honorary member in 1916 and he judged a piano competition in the spring of 1917. On October 2–5, 1917, he led the BSO in historic recordings for the Victor Talking Machine Company in Camden, New Jersey. The sessions included works by Tchaikovsky, Wolf-Ferrari, Berlioz, Beethoven, and Wagner.

Philip Hale, music critic of the Boston Herald during Muck's years there, wrote: "He stands there calm, undemonstrative, graceful, elegant, aristocratic; a man of singularly commanding and magnetic personality even in repose. The orchestra is his speech, the expression of the composer's music as it appeals to the conductor's brain, heart and soul."

== National Anthem controversy ==
After American entry into World War I in the spring of 1917, Muck offered to resign his position as music director of the BSO. He anticipated that his natural sympathies for Germany, where he was born and spent most of his career despite his Swiss citizenship, might give offense. Henry Lee Higginson, the orchestra's founder and financer, declined it and instead signed Muck to another five-year contract. Muck had fears for his own safety, but Higginson gave him assurances that as an apolitical artist he had nothing to fear. Even so, Muck became very sensitive to avoid giving offense. The orchestra's publicity manager later wrote: "A good and patriotic German, he had become greatly attached to this country, and altogether he was a thoroughly unhappy man." Nevertheless, he continued his former practice and programmed concerts of Classical music only by German and Austro-Hungarian composers on his first tour of American cities following U.S. entry into the war, which some found not at all sensitive to the public's mood in wartime.

In the fall of 1917, some orchestras like the New York Orchestra Society started performing "The Star-Spangled Banner" at all their concerts. Members of the BSO management team discussed programming the anthem for weeks, but without any sense of the issue's importance. Moreover, the orchestra's manager, Charles A. Ellis, did not want to embarrass Muck by asking him to conduct the anthem, particularly given Muck's close attachment to his birthplace and his past personal friendship with the last Kaiser.

The BSO performed regularly at Infantry Hall in Providence, Rhode Island, where John R. Rathom, the unscrupulous and openly Pro-British editor of the Providence Journal had been attacking Muck for his past ties to the last Kaiser. The BSO's managers anticipated there might be trouble during their October 1917 visit. One member of the management team later said that Major Higginson, the BSO's chairman, was "pugnacious" while Ellis, the manager, was "rather nervous" as they joined the orchestra on the trip. Higginson took measures to protect Muck's safety in the case of serious trouble.

On October 30, 1917, the day of the concert, the Providence Journal published an editorial that said "Professor Muck is a man of notoriously pro-German affiliations and the programme as announced is almost entirely German in character." Rathom also demanded that the BSO to perform the National Anthem that night "to put Professor Muck to the test." About to leave Boston for Providence, Higginson and Ellis received two requests, one from a local patriotic organization and another from the heads of local music clubs, asking the BSO to play the anthem. Muck never saw the request, but Higginson and others viewed it as the work of John R. Rathom, editor and publisher of the Providence Journal, whose motto was "Raise hell and sell newspapers." They dismissed the request without much consideration and the concert went off without incident. Muck only learned of the petition on the orchestra's train ride back to Boston that same night. Shocked and somewhat fearful, he said he did not object to playing the anthem, that it was fitting for him as a guest in America to accommodate the wishes of his host country.

Now that the BSO had failed to play the anthem, Rathom created the false narrative that Muck had known of the request and had refused to perform it, accused Muck of treason (sic) and called him a German spy and a hater of all things American.

Similarly to Rathom's many other fake news publicity stunts, the Muck story instantly took on a life of its own. As the orchestra publicity manager wrote years later of Muck, "his fate, so far as America was concerned, was settled that night in Providence because of the short-sighted stubbornness of Henry L. Higginson and Charles A. Ellis." The American Defense Society demanded Muck's immediate arrest and internment. The orchestra found its November Baltimore engagement canceled, with even Cardinal Gibbons adding his voice to denunciations of Muck.

Just as he had following the 1891 New Orleans lynchings, former U.S. President Theodore Roosevelt took fake news in print at face value and also publicly denounced the maestro. Rival conductor Walter Damrosch, the music director of the New York Symphony Society (later the New York Philharmonic), also denounced Muck's "cynical disregard of the sanctity of our national air", which Damrosch alleged showed disrespect for the emotions of his audience and led to a disrespect for the great heritage of German music.

Meanwhile, Major Higginson claimed responsibility for the BSO's initial failure to play the anthem, with little effect on the outrage stirred by the now nationwide press coverage. He visited the Washington, D.C. headquarters of the Department of Justice and received assurances that the government had no issue with any member of the orchestra. He tried to present the issue as one of artistic freedom, saying he would rather disband the orchestra than allow anyone to dictate its programming for political reasons. Muck took a similarly apolitical artistic stance with the statement: "Art is a thing by itself, and not related to any particular nation or group. Therefore, it would be a gross mistake, a violation of artistic taste and principles for such an organization as ours to play patriotic airs. Does the public think that the Symphony Orchestra is a military band or a ballroom orchestra?"

Back in Boston, the BSO found curiosity and support. On November 2, 1917, the crowd that filled a Friday afternoon concert at Symphony Hall read a program insert announcing that the national anthem would follow every BSO concert and applauded when Higginson appeared. Higginson announced that Muck had once again tendered his resignation so that "no prejudice against him may prejudice the welfare of the orchestra" and Higginson had yet to accept it. The audience then greeted the entry of Muck with a standing ovation and rose to applaud again after he led the orchestra in a performance of "The Star-Spangled Banner".

The New York Times pointed out that the entire affair could have been avoided if Higginson and Muck had had a better sense of the public sentiment. They should have anticipated the request for the anthem and should have programmed it in the first place. The paper blamed the entire affair on Muck and "the then obstinate management of the Boston Symphony Orchestra."

In November, the BSO performed in New York City, where at last Higginson and Ellis reluctantly gave in to Muck's insistence on playing the anthem. Critics were not completely satisfied and criticized the arrangement Muck used as "cheap" and "undignified" without realizing it was the work of Victor Herbert, who in addition to his popular Broadway operettas had also written serious symphonic works and conducted both the New York Philharmonic and the Pittsburgh Symphony. When the orchestra returned to New York in December, Muck used a new arrangement that proved a critical success. It was the work of BSO concertmaster Anton Witek, "the most pro-German of all the Germans in the orchestra."

== Internment ==
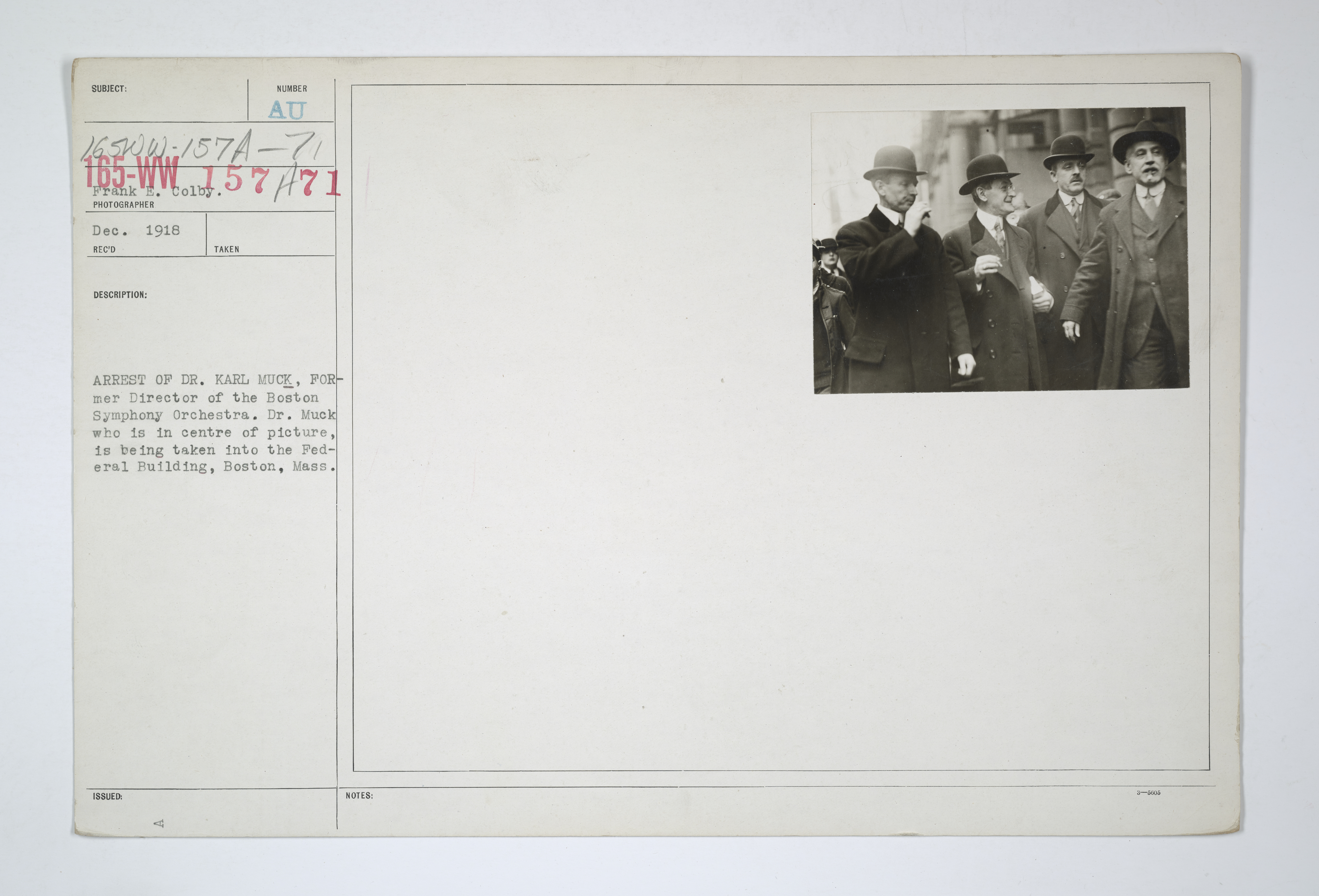
Arrest of Karl Muck.

Muck was arrested on March 25, 1918, just before midnight and therefore the BSO's performances of Bach's Saint Matthew Passion on March 26 and April 2, which Muck had been preparing for months, had to be conducted by Ernst Schmidt. Government officials were free to ignore the fact that he was a citizen of neutral Switzerland and the bearer of a Swiss passport, since the law sanctioned the arrest of those born in any of the German States before the 1871 founding of the German Empire without respect to citizenship. Boston police and federal agents also searched Muck's home at 50 Fenway and removed personal papers and scores. They suspected the conductor's markings in the score of the St. Matthew Passion were coded messages proving that Muck was a German spy. As part of German-American internment, he was imprisoned at Fort Oglethorpe, Georgia. The Phi Mu Alpha Sinfonia music fraternity that had elected him to national honorary membership in 1916 expelled Muck in 1919 for allegedly sympathizing with the Central Powers.

Fellow internees had heard that Muck had decided in protest to never conduct in America again, but they persuaded him that the camp was more of a German village — which was facetiously dubbed "Orglesdorf." A memoir of the event written in 1940 recalled the mess hall packed with 2000 internees, with honored guests like their doctors and government censors on the front benches, facing 100 musicians. Under Muck's baton, he wrote, "the Eroica rushed at us and carried us far away and above war and worry and barbed wire."

On August 21, 1919, an agent of the U.S. Department of Justice put Muck and his wife aboard a ship bound for Copenhagen. Before sailing from New York Harbor, Muck told reporters: "I am not a German, although they said I was. I considered myself an American." He admitted, however, to having "bitter feelings" toward certain American newspapers over their biased and inaccurate treatment of him. He also expressed doubts that the BSO, which was in a sorry state of organization, would ever recover after the similar internment of 29 of its best musicians.

Meanwhile, the American media's smear campaign continued. Later that year the Boston Post alleged that Muck had been having an extramarital affair with soprano Rosamond Young, a 20-year-old in Boston's Back Bay and had written her a letter reading in part: "I am on my way to the concert hall to entertain the crowds of dogs and swine who think that because they pay the entrance fee they have the right to dictate to me my selections. I hate to play for this rabble ... [In] a very short time our gracious Kaiser will smile on my request and recall me to Berlin ... Our Kaiser will be prevailed upon to see the benefit to the Fatherland of my obtaining a divorce and making you my own."

After his deportation, Karl Muck declined all subsequent invitations to return to the United States.

== Later career, 1919–1933 ==
Muck returned to a different Germany. The recent German Revolution of 1918–1919 made him "a man in marked disfavor with the republican government." The death of his beloved wife Anita on April 14, 1921, left him "infinitely lonesome". Muck eventually took the helm of the Hamburg Philharmonic Orchestra in 1922 and made additional recordings. He returned to Bayreuth when the festival was revived there in 1924, the representative of the pre-war tradition. He expressed his devotion to the festival and Wagner's music in a letter advising Fritz Busch that all he needed to succeed there was "the unassuming humility and the holy fanaticism of the Believer." He was also engaged in Munich, Amsterdam (Concertgebouw Orchestra) and Salzburg (Don Giovanni in 1925).

In September 1930, he resigned his position at Bayreuth, much to the distress of Winifred Wagner, who had just succeeded her late husband Siegfried Wagner as the festival's director. He never accommodated himself to being upstaged by Toscanini, but writing privately to Winifred Wagner, he said he had been committed to serving her husband, but the Festival now required someone other than "I, whose artistic standpoint and convictions, so far as Baireuth [sic] is concerned, stem from the preceding century." Muck also resigned his Hamburg position in 1933, as censorship in Nazi Germany began to affect the performance of Classical music in ideological ways that made Muck deeply uncomfortable.

His last noteworthy appearance came in February 1933 at a concert marking the 50th anniversary of Wagner's death, given at Leipzig and with Adolf Hitler among those in attendance. His final concert was on May 19, 1933, with the Hamburg Philharmonic. In October 1939, Muck "on his 80th birthday in Berlin received from Adolf Hitler the Plaque of the German Eagle" with the inscription DEM GROSSEN DIRIGENTEN (TO THE GREAT CONDUCTOR).

A widower since 1921, whose only child, a son, had died young, Muck spent his last years at the Stuttgart home of Baroness von Scholley, the daughter of his close friend and fellow Fort Oglethorpe internee, who had served the German Foreign Office as Consul General in New York City. Partially paralyzed from nicotine poisoning and immersing himself in Oriental philosophy, he rarely left the house during the last three years of his life. Muck died in Stuttgart, Germany on March 3, 1940, at the age of 80. Upon receipt of the news of his death, the BSO interrupted a rehearsal to stand in silent tribute to his memory. Geraldine Farrar wrote a letter to the New York Times recalling that she sang with him and the Boston Symphony on the night when Muck was "bitterly and unjustly assailed" for not playing the National Anthem and adding: "As your editorial correctly reports, he knew nothing of the request." She continued: "The fortunes of war brought Dr. Muck — as well as other aliens — no disgrace in an internment camp. I saw Dr. Muck several times in later years and I know he counted the years with the Boston Symphony Orchestra among the happiest and most fruitful of his career."

== Recordings ==
Muck's reputation rests largely on his recorded legacy. In October 1917 he made a series of sound recordings in the US with the Boston Symphony Orchestra for the Victor Talking Machine Company in their Camden, New Jersey auditorium. Unusually for the time (when the pre-electric purely mechanical “acoustic” process was in use) the orchestra seems to have been recorded at full strength as the 1919 Victor catalogue refers to "approximately a hundred men". Eight short pieces spread over ten 78 r.p.m. sides were selected, including excerpts from Beethoven's Symphony No. 7, Tchaikovsky's Symphony No. 4 and two items from Berlioz's Damnation of Faust.

Muck's most important recordings were made at the 1927 Bayreuth Festival for the English Columbia Gramophone Company and in 1927 to 1929 in Berlin for the Gramophone Company (His Master's Voice). At Bayreuth sometime between late June and mid-August 1927, he conducted about 30 minutes of excerpts from Parsifal Acts 1 and 2. His control of phrasing in the Transformation and Grail scenes is regarded as unsurpassed to this day. In December 1927 he led the Berlin State Opera Orchestra in an account of the opera's Prelude, one of the slowest on record. A year later, in December 1928, he made a nearly complete recording of the third act of Parsifal, using the Parsifal and Gurnemanz singers from that year's Bayreuth performances. The music critic Alan Blyth described this as "the most uplifting, superbly executed reading of Act 3 ... in the history of recording" and Robin Holloway commented that "It realizes better than any other Wagner performance the idea of endless melody". In all about 40% of the opera's score was recorded over the 2 1/2-year period. His Master's Voice also recorded eight further Wagner orchestral pieces, including the Siegfried Idyll, with the Berlin State Opera Orchestra in December 1927, May 1928, and November 1929. These have been reissued on various CDs.

A discography of Muck's original commercial recordings, not including reissues, appeared in 1977.

Several radio recordings allegedly conducted by Muck also exist, including a Faust Overture and Trauermarsch (Götterdämmerung) with the Berlin Radio Symphony Orchestra and an excerpt from the Adagio of Bruckner's Symphony No. 7 with the Hamburg Philharmonic.

== Cultural depictions ==
- In Maria Peters' 2018 film De Dirigent (The Conductor), a biopic about Antonia Brico, Muck's student from 1927 to 1932 and the first internationally recognized female conductor of Classical music, Karl Muck was played by German actor Richard Sammel.
