= List of historic properties in Dateland, Arizona =

- Town
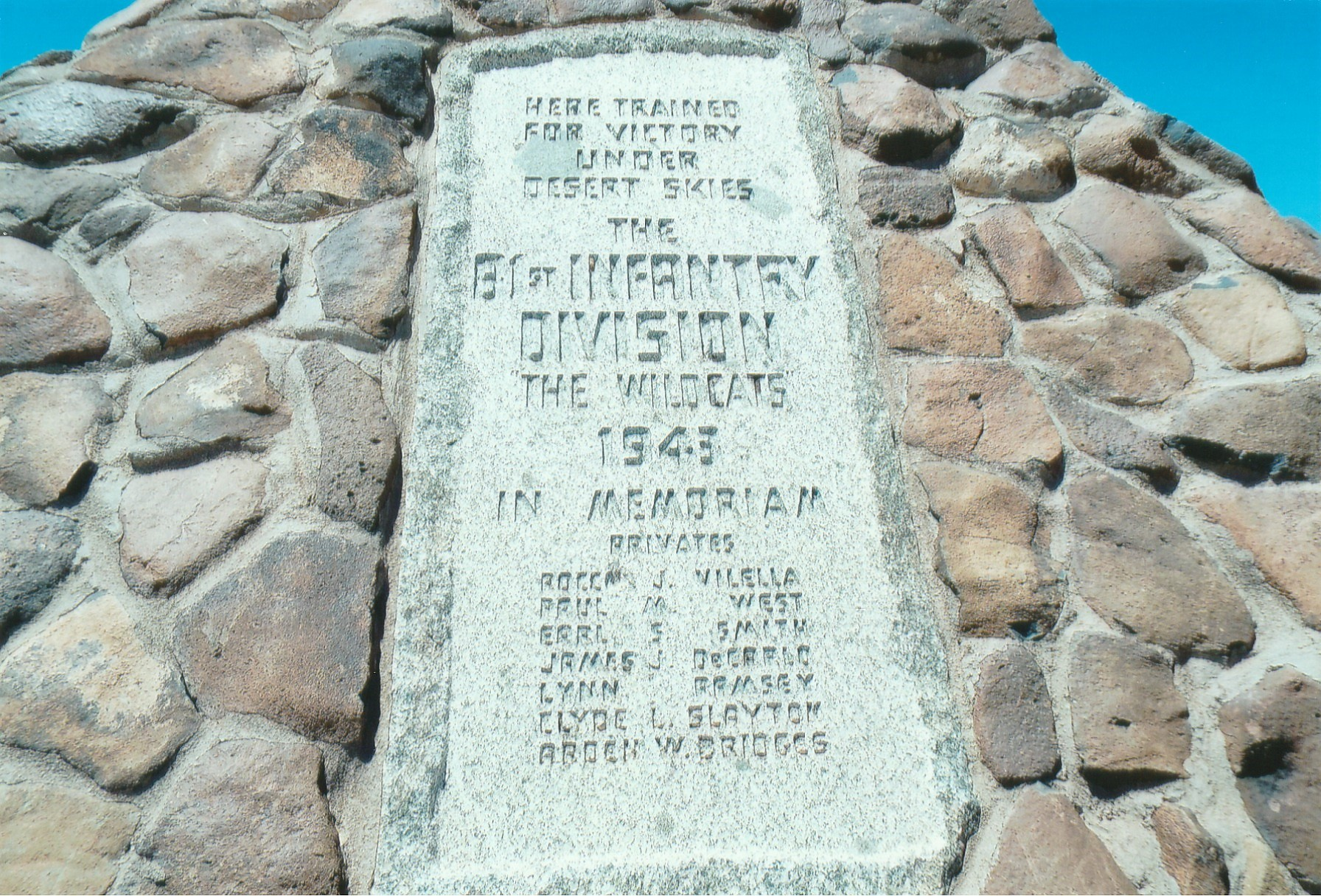
- Camp Horn Monument; NRHP 2003, reference #03000900.

This is a list which includes a photographic gallery, of some of the remaining ruins and monuments of historic significance in Dateland, Arizona and the surrounding areas which include Hyder and Sentinel. Dateland is a CDP and a populated place in Yuma County. The area was once inhabited by Native-American tribes. Dateland is named after its Medjool date trees. It was once the home of two World War II training camps, Camp Horn and Camp Hyder. The town also served as the home to the Dateland Army Air Field, a World War II United States Army Air Forces training airfield.

== Brief history ==
The Oatman Mountain was formed from multiple lava flows from a series of vents that over time, built the peak into the shield shape. The mountain was named after the Oatman family who were massacred nearby by the Apaches in the 1850s.

Three of the prehistoric cultures which are believed to have resided in the Sears Point, located in the area surrounding Dateland, are the Desert Archaic, Patayan and Hohokams. They lived in the area between 10,000 BC and 1,450 AD. Evidence of their existence can be found in the hundreds of symbolic and artistic rock etchings in the Painted Rock Petroglyph Site. The ancient Native-Americans obviously used the Gila to hunt, fish and farm When European settlers arrived in the region the area was home to the Tonto and Yavapai Apache tribes. One of the first European expeditions into the area was led by Juan Bautista de Anza. The explorer set forth from Tubac and headed west towards California. During his travels in the Yuma area he established good relations with the Yuma tribes. The trail in the Dateland area is now known as the Juan Bautista de Anza National Historic Trail.

== Mormon Trail ==
Arizona belonged to Mexico until the end of the Mexican–American War in 1848. In 1846, President Polk, authorized the army to recruit 500 Mormons to join their forces in the war with Mexico. The Mormon Battalion was mustered into service on July 16, 1846, in Council Bluffs, Iowa. Although the battalion was prepared to engage the enemy if necessary, the Mormon Battalion did not find an occasion to fire their weapons in combat. The government wanted to establish a southern route to California, as the northern route was impassable up to 9 months of each year due to snow in the mountains. The Battalion came through the area on December 30, 1846, with 25 wagons and road building equipment under the command of Stephan W. Kearney. They completed a 700-mile trail between New Mexico and California. The trail established by the battalion became known as the Mormon Battalion Trail.

The Oatman family were members of the Mormon faith who left Independence, Missouri in August 1850, and headed towards California on the Butterfield Stage Road. They were attacked by the Apaches in March 1851. Royce and Mary Oatman and four of their seven children were murdered. The Apaches took two of the girls, 14 year old Olive and 7 rear old Mary Ann. They left one of the boys, Lorenzo, for dead. The girls were eventually sold to the Mohaves. The girls were accepted as members of the Mohave. Mary Ann died while in captivity and Olive was released by the Mohaves after her brother Lorenzo found out that she was still alive and where she was living. The site where nine members of the Oatman family are buried is located close to the Oatman Massacre site on Oatman Highway in Dateland.

== Butterfield Overland Mail Trail ==
The Mormon Battalion Trail was later used by the Butterfield Overland Mail Route. The Butterfield Overland Mail Trail was a stagecoach service in the United States, operating from 1857 to 1861. In 1867, the trail was once more used and was known as the Southern Overland Trail.

William Fourr (1841–1935) was born in Missouri. Like so many other pioneers, Fourr headed to Arizona in search of gold. He did not excel as a prospector and instead worked as a rider on the Southern Arizona mail route. He eventually became a rancher, Apache Indian fighter and finally a cattleman. Fourr and his family established a ranch on Datelands Oatman Flat. Fourr, who was once an agent of the Butterfield Stage Stop, built a Southern Overland Trail stage stop station on the old Butterfield Mail Trail in 1869.

Nate Salsbury (1846–1902), who was the principal owner and business manager for William F. Cody 's "Buffalo Bill’s Wild West Show", owned a ranch in Dateland. Salsbury was also a mining partner of William F. Cody a.k.a. Buffalo Bill Cody. Allegedly Buffalo Bill resided for a short time with his friend and in 1890, scratched "Bill Cody 1890" in wall inside the adobe and stone house. That same year Salsbury died and Cody headed to Oracle, Arizona. The ruins of the stone house are located on the frontage road just off the Spot Road in Dateland.

Historic Dateland, Hyder and Sentinel, Arizona
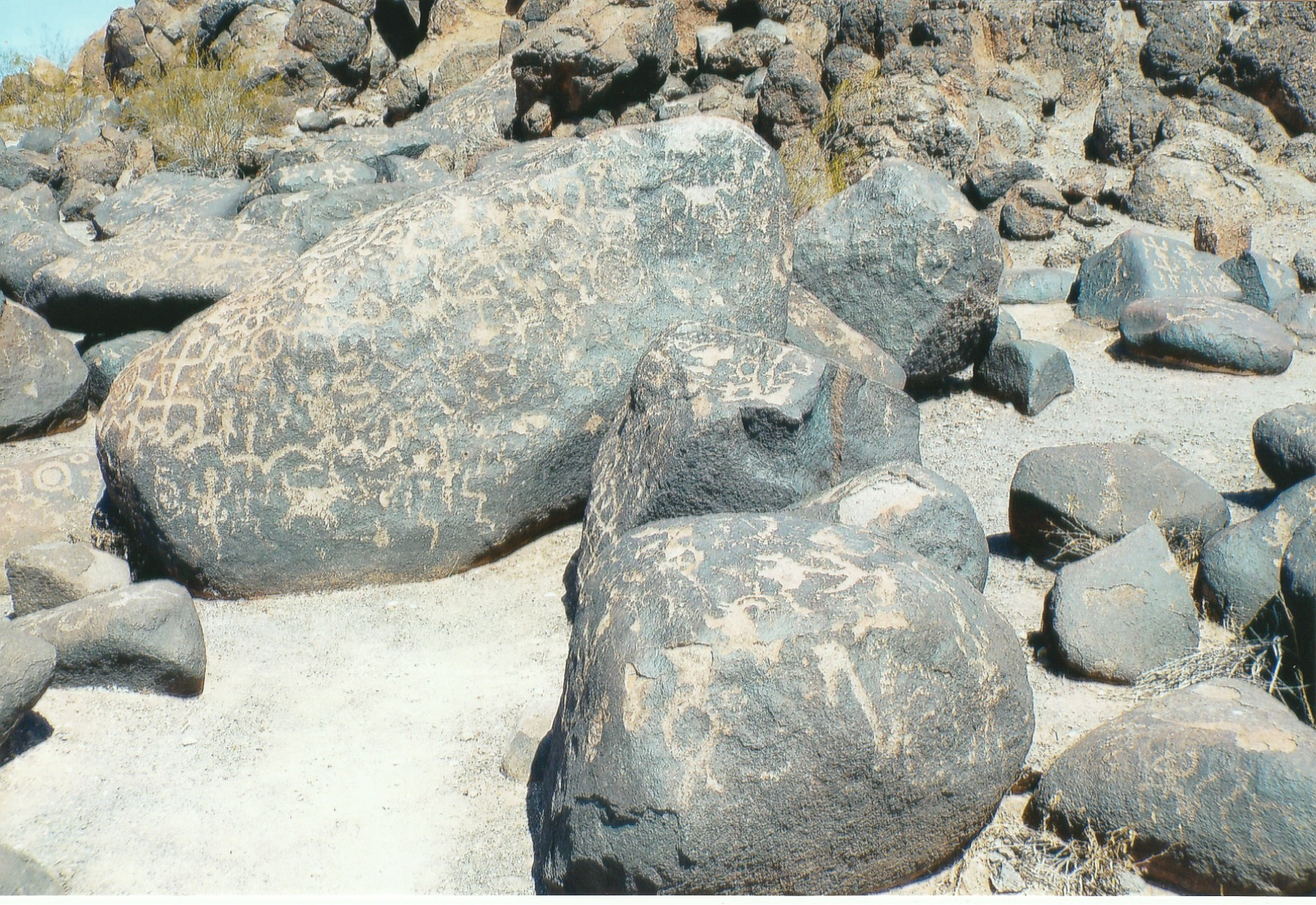
Symbolic and artistic rock etchings produced centuries ago by prehistoric peoples

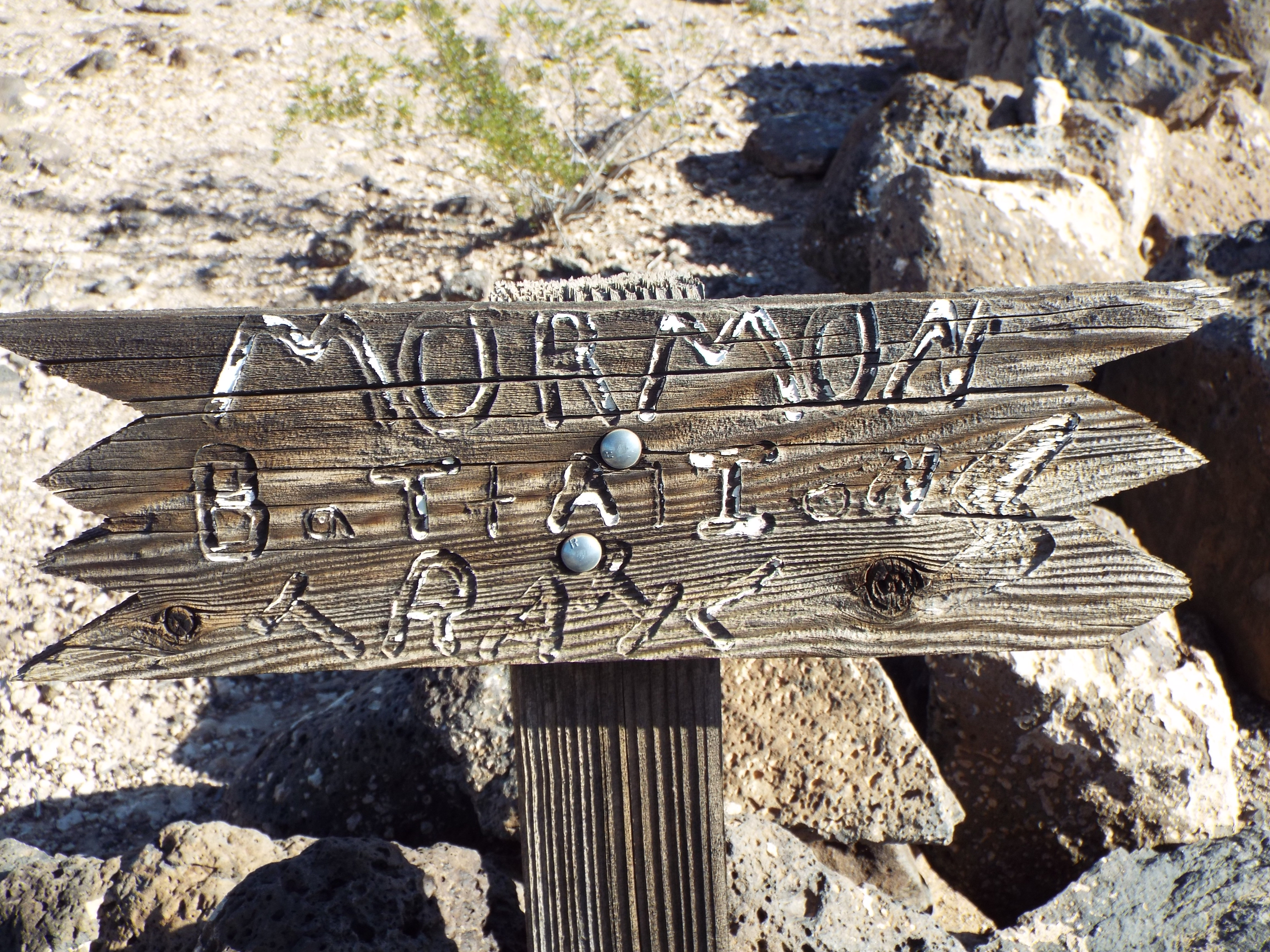
Mormon Battalion Trail marker in Oatman Flats, Dateland, Az.

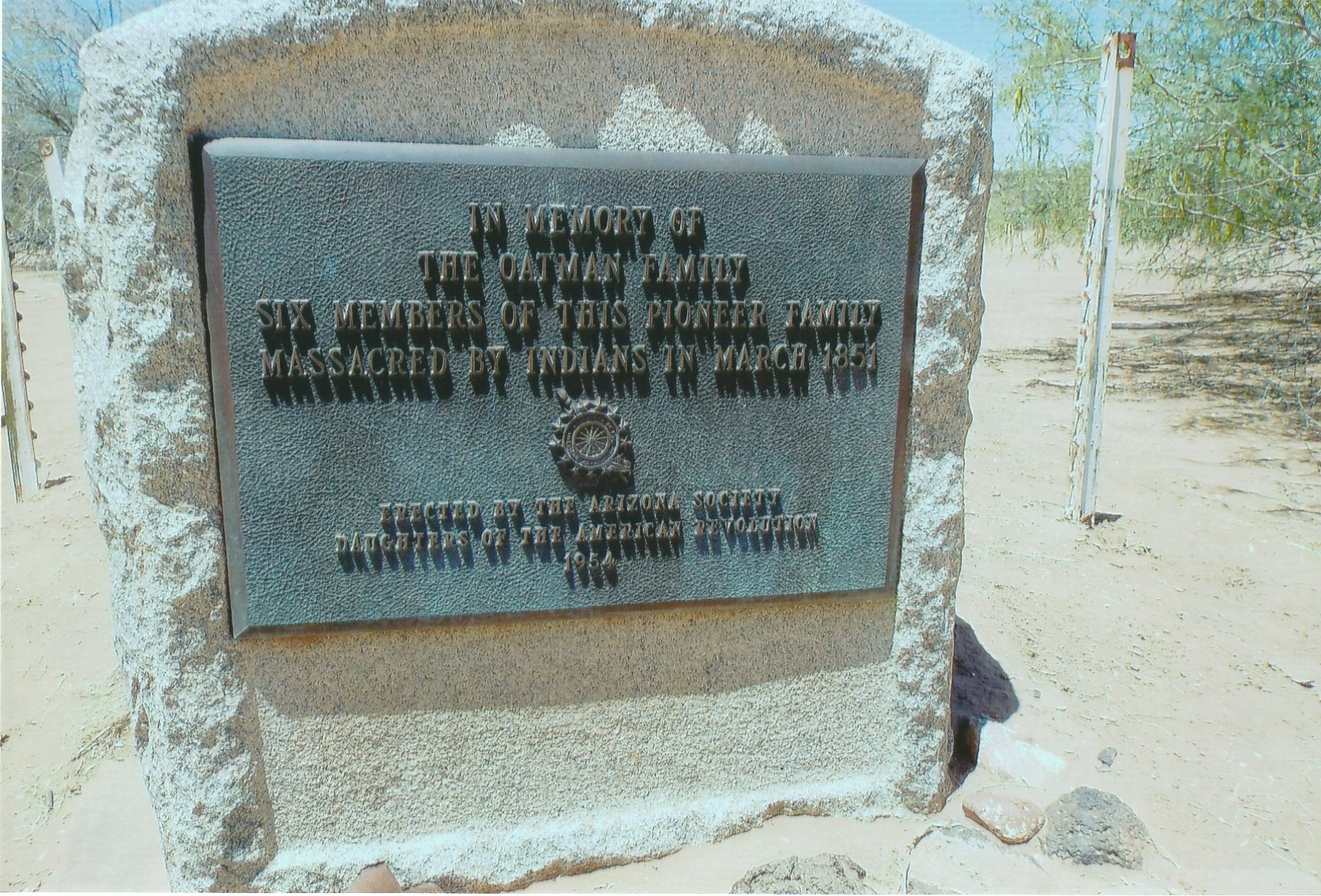
Oatman family grave

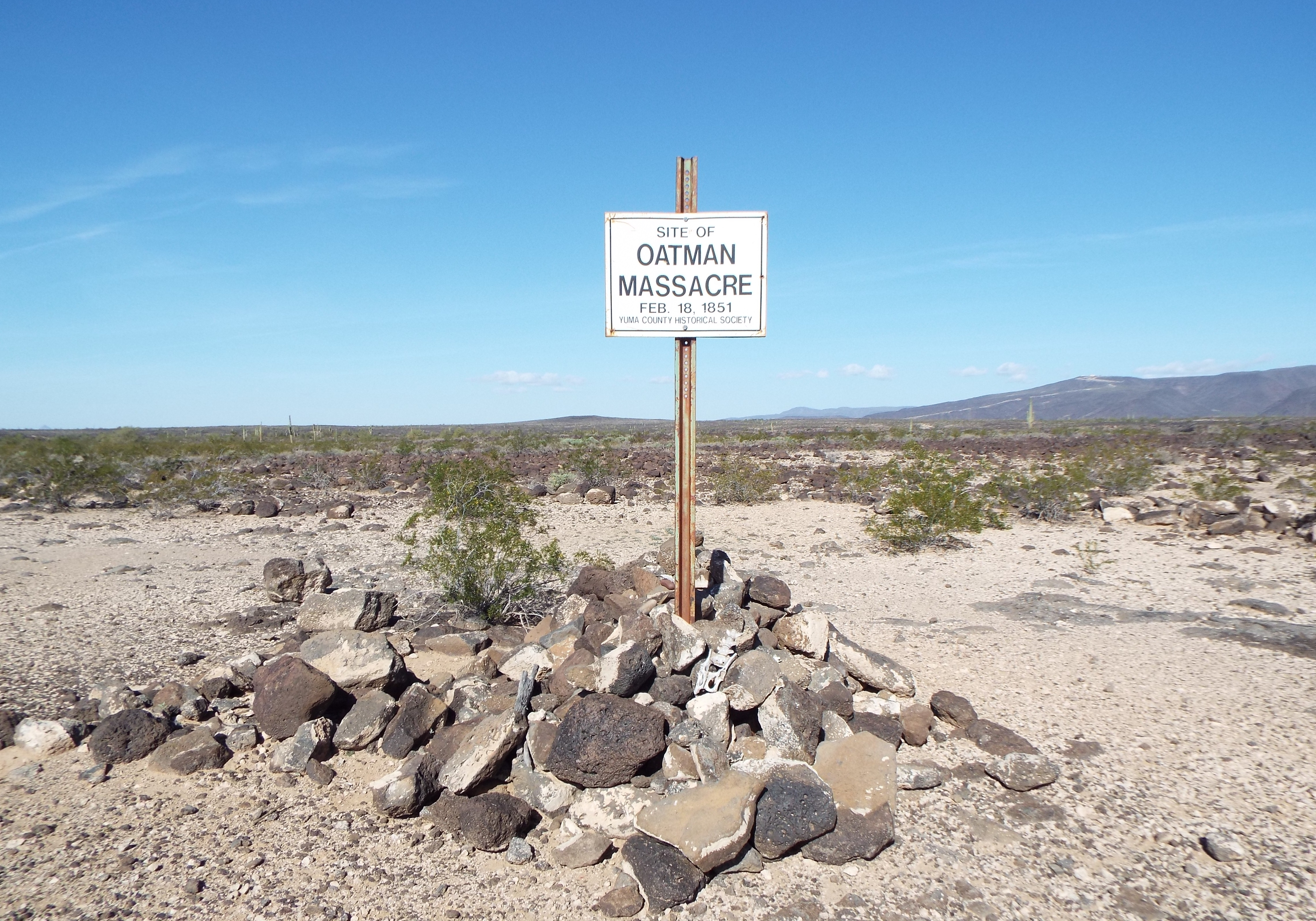
Oatman Family Masacre site

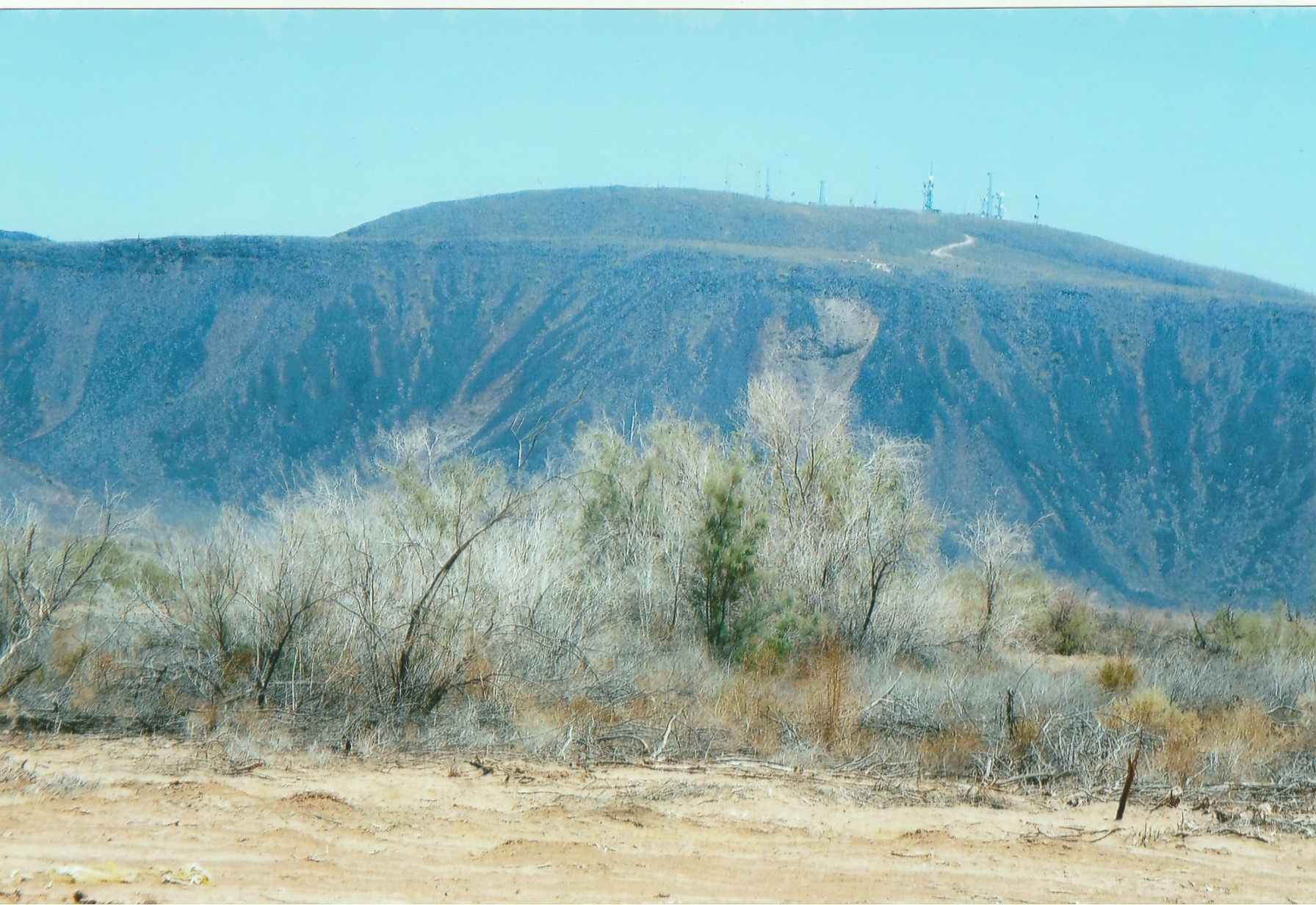
Oatman Mountain

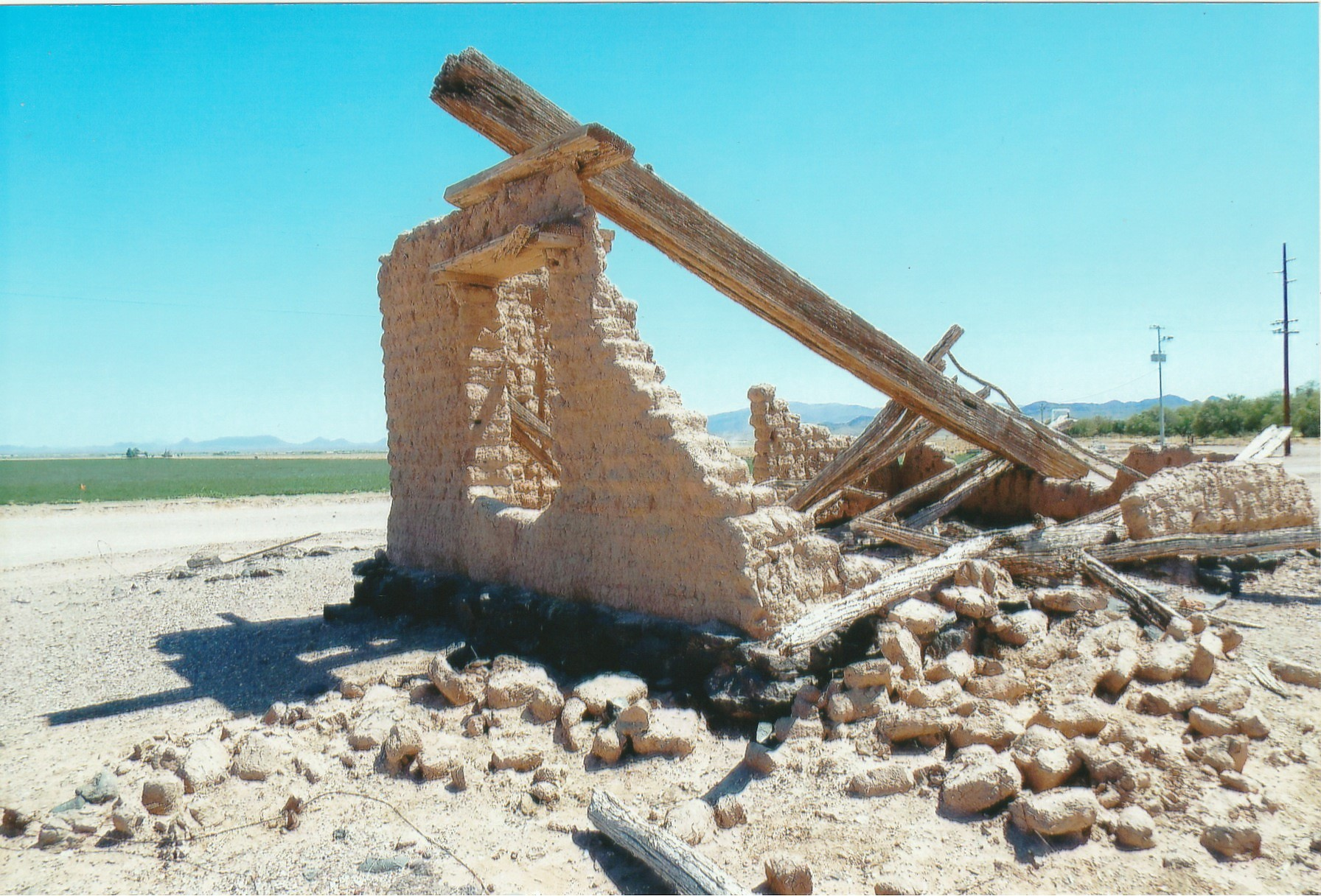
Ruins of the Southern Overland Trail stage stop station built by William Fourr

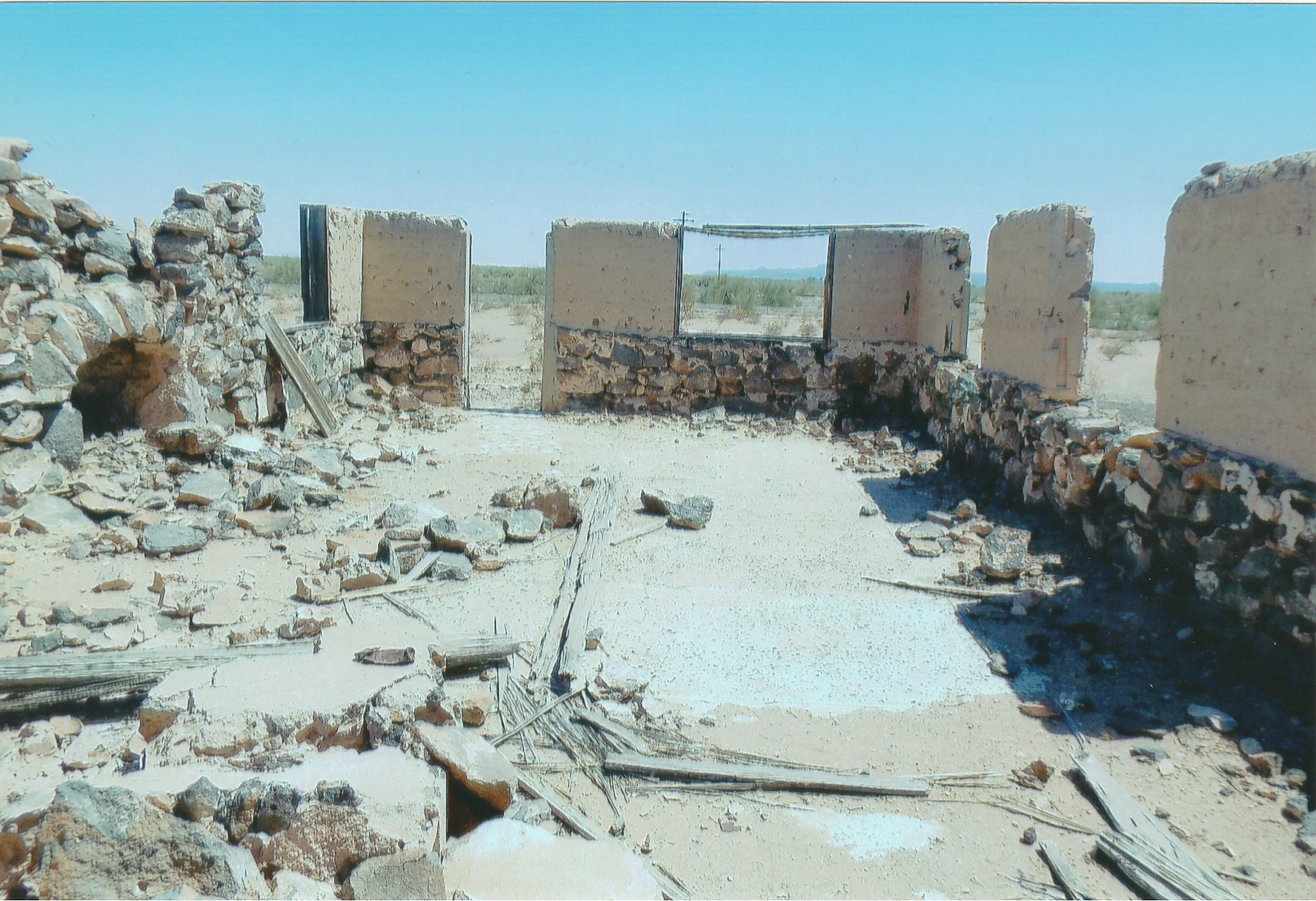
Inside the Nate Salsbury house ruins

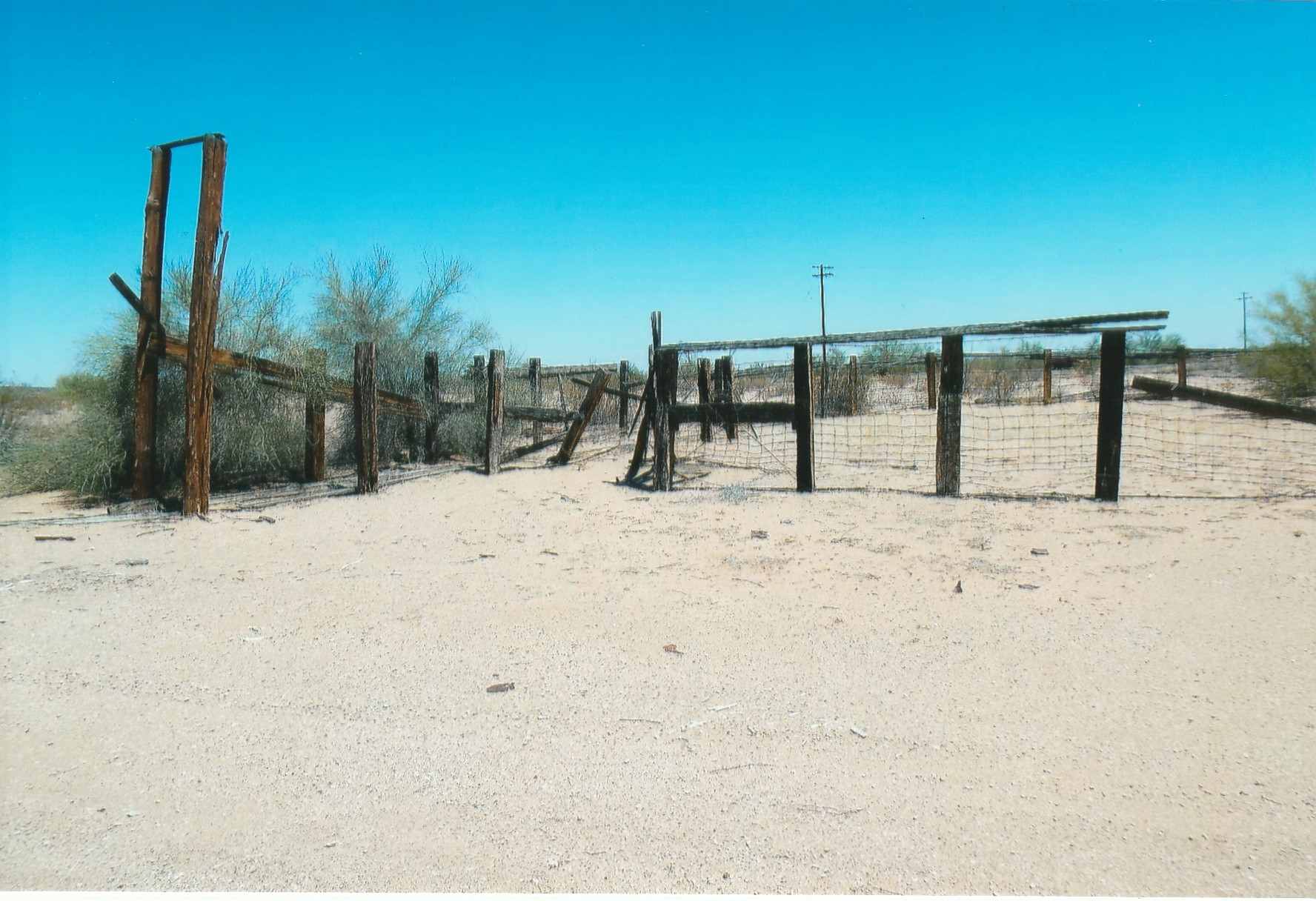
Nate Salsbury Corral

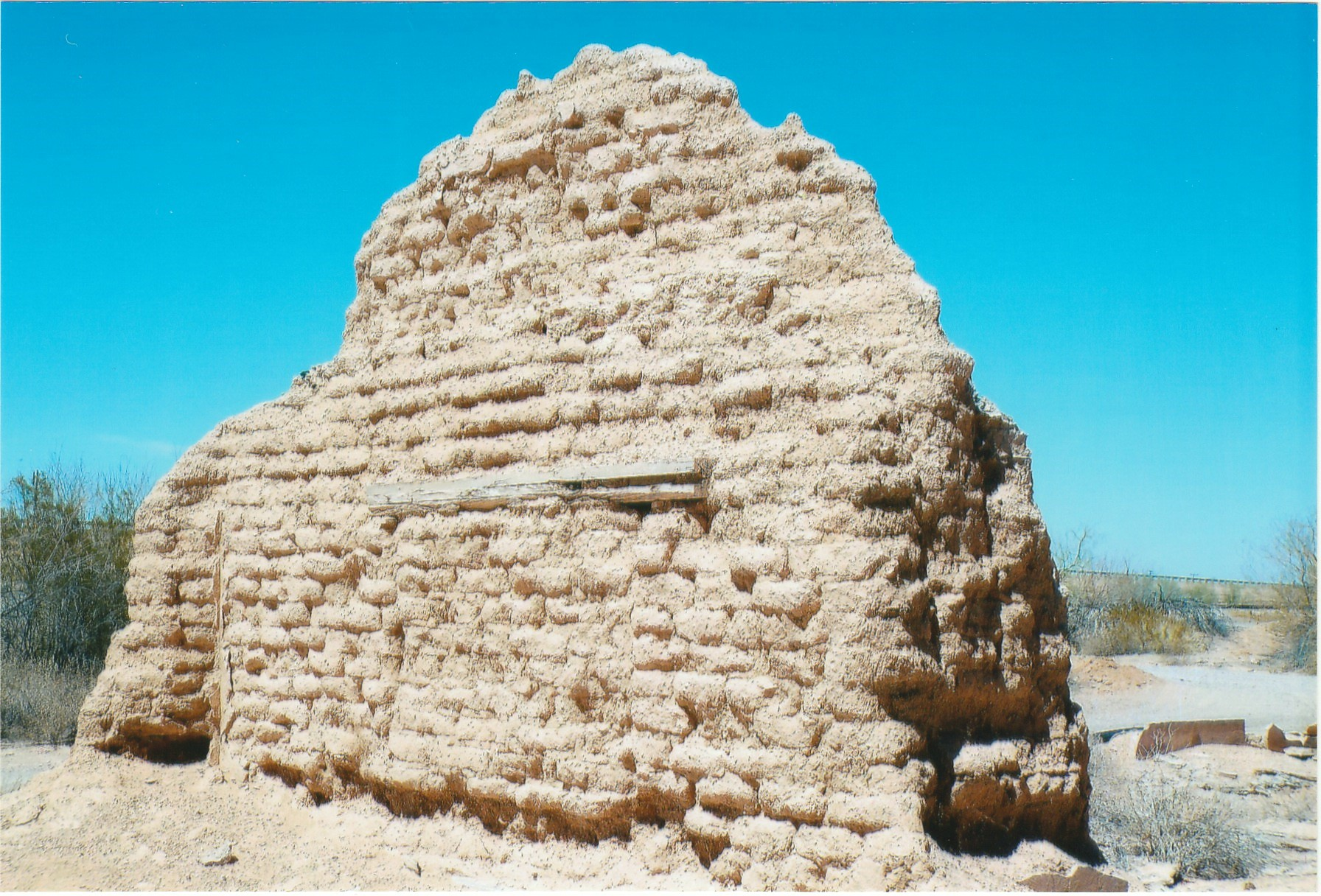
Ruins of the 1895 Sentinel Train Depot

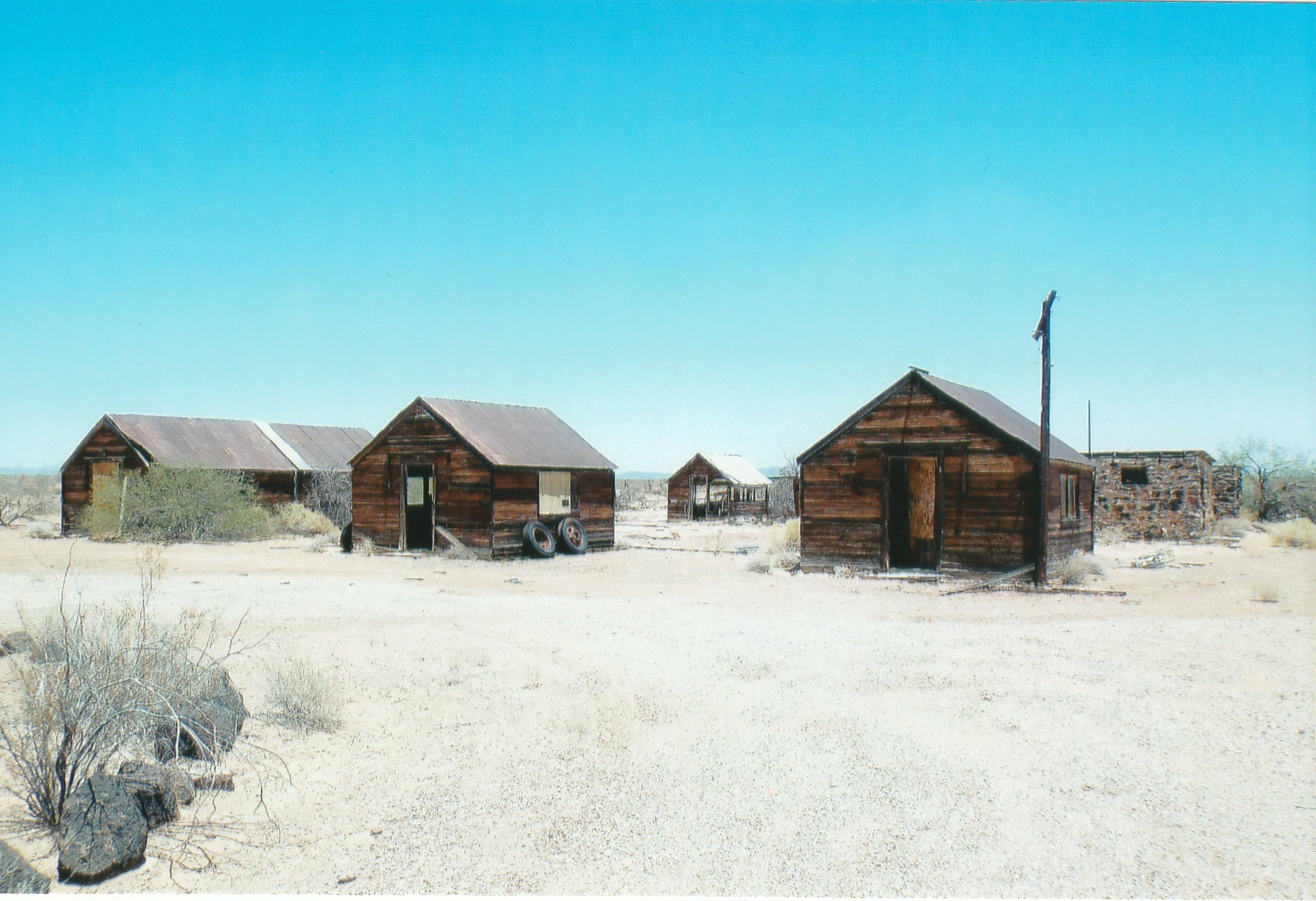
1890s Camp Hyder structures

== World War II ==
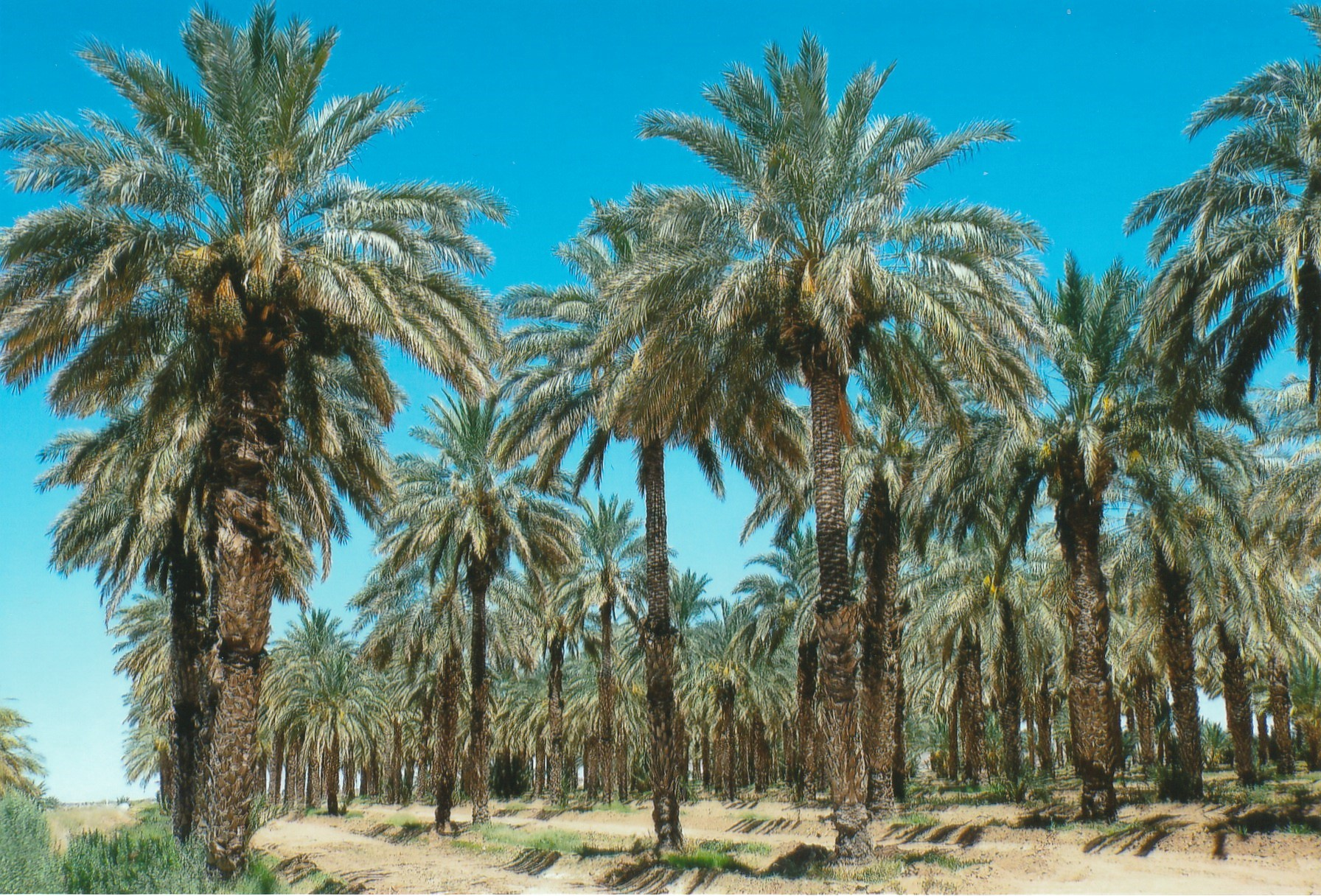
Medjool Date Palms in Dateland

Dateland, named after the Medjool Date Palms, was a road stop in the 1920s that served the travelers who were headed to and from California. During World War II, Dateland became the home to two of General George Patton's desert training camps, Camp Horn and Camp Hyder. It was also the home of three airfields including the Dateland Army Air Field.

Both Camp Horn and Hyder were established in 1943. Camp Horn served the 81st Infantry Division and 104th Infantry Division. Camp Hyder, named after the farming community of Hyder was located on the grounds of an old 1890s military camp site. It was used to prepare and harden the troops for action in the North African desert.

The Dateland Army Air Field was also established in 1943. It was originally a gunnery training base, but it was eventually converted into a B-25 bomber training facility during World War II. The air field later became known as the Dateland Air Force Auxiliary Field.

== Properties, plaques and monuments pictured ==
The properties and monuments pictured are the following:

- The Mormon Battalion Trail – marker which indicate the location of the historic trail.
- The ruins of the 1869 Southern Overland Trail Stage Stop Station.
- The Fourr Family House.
- The Fourr Cemetery – The location where four of the children of William Fourr and his wife Lucinda are buried. However, there are only three tombstones those of A.F. Fourr and F.F. Fourr, who died in January 1877 and then that of an unnamed baby. It is located alongside the Rocky Point Road in Dateland.
- The Oatman Mountain – Located in Dateland on the Arlington-Sentinel Volcanic Field and named after the Oatman family who were massacred in the area in 1850.
- The Oatman family massacre site – The historic site where the Oatman family were murdered.
- The Oatman family grave – The grave where nine members of the Oatman family who were murdered in 1851 in what is known as the Apache Oatman Massacre are buried. The graves are located close to the Oatman Massacre site.
- The Oatman Flats Ranch – Entrance to abandoned 1900 ranch.
- The Oatman Flats Ranch House – The main 1900 ranch house of the Oatman Flats Ranch.
- Camp Hyder – 1890s military camp named after the town of Hyder. The buildings, which are still in good condition, were once used by the 77th Infantry Division and the 104th Infantry Division during World War II.
- Camp Horn Monument – The monument is located on 64E Ave. in Dateland. The stone pyramid was erected in memory of the seven servicemen who were accidentally killed during their training in the camp. The Camp Horn Monument was added to the National Register of Historic Places in 2003, reference #03000900.
- Dateland Army Air Field and plaque – a Foundation of the World War II airfield which was established on January 1, 1943, as a United States Army Air Forces training airfield, under the command of the 3037th Army Air Force Base Unit, AAF Western Flying Training Command. The airfield was located alongside East 64th Avenue. It was last used in 1957 and is currently abandoned. The inscription on the plaque dedicated to the airfield misspelled "Dateland" and instead inscribed "Datelan".
- The Concrete Bunker in Dateland Army Air Field. The sand-filled concrete bunker built c. 1943, was previously used to sight the machine guns of the B-25 Mitchell bomber.
- The "Lone Ranger" crash site and plaque – The crash site of the Boeing B-50A Superfortress, #46-020, known as the "Lone Ranger", that belonged to the 43rd Bomb Wing, 65th Bomb Squadron. The Co-Pilot, Lt. William Gentry and bombardier, Captain John Lee managed to escape the crash by parachuting while the rest of the crew (12) perished; The crash occurred on March 23, 1950, and the site is located on East 64th Avenue.
- The Camp Hyder plaque – dedicated to all the soldiers that served here and especially to those who gave their lives to end the Holocaust & defeat the Armed Forces of Nazi Germany, Fascist Italy, and Imperial Japan. It is located on East 64th Avenue in Dateland.
- The Nate Salsbury house – Allegedly Buffalo Bill resided for a short time in the house of his friend. A wall inside the house has the name “Bill Cody 1902” scratched on it, the same year that Salsbury died and Cody headed to the town of Oracle, Az. The ruins of the stone house are located on the frontage road just off Spot Road in Dateland.
- The Sentinel Train Depot ruins – The adobe ruins of the 1895 Sentinel Train Depot. The depot was once used as restaurant.
- Cattle Ranch – Ruins of a small 1890s cattle ranch in Sentinel.

== Historic structures and monuments ==
The following are the images of the historic structures, monuments and plaques in Dateland and its surrounding areas.

Historic Dateland, Hyder and Sentinel, Arizona

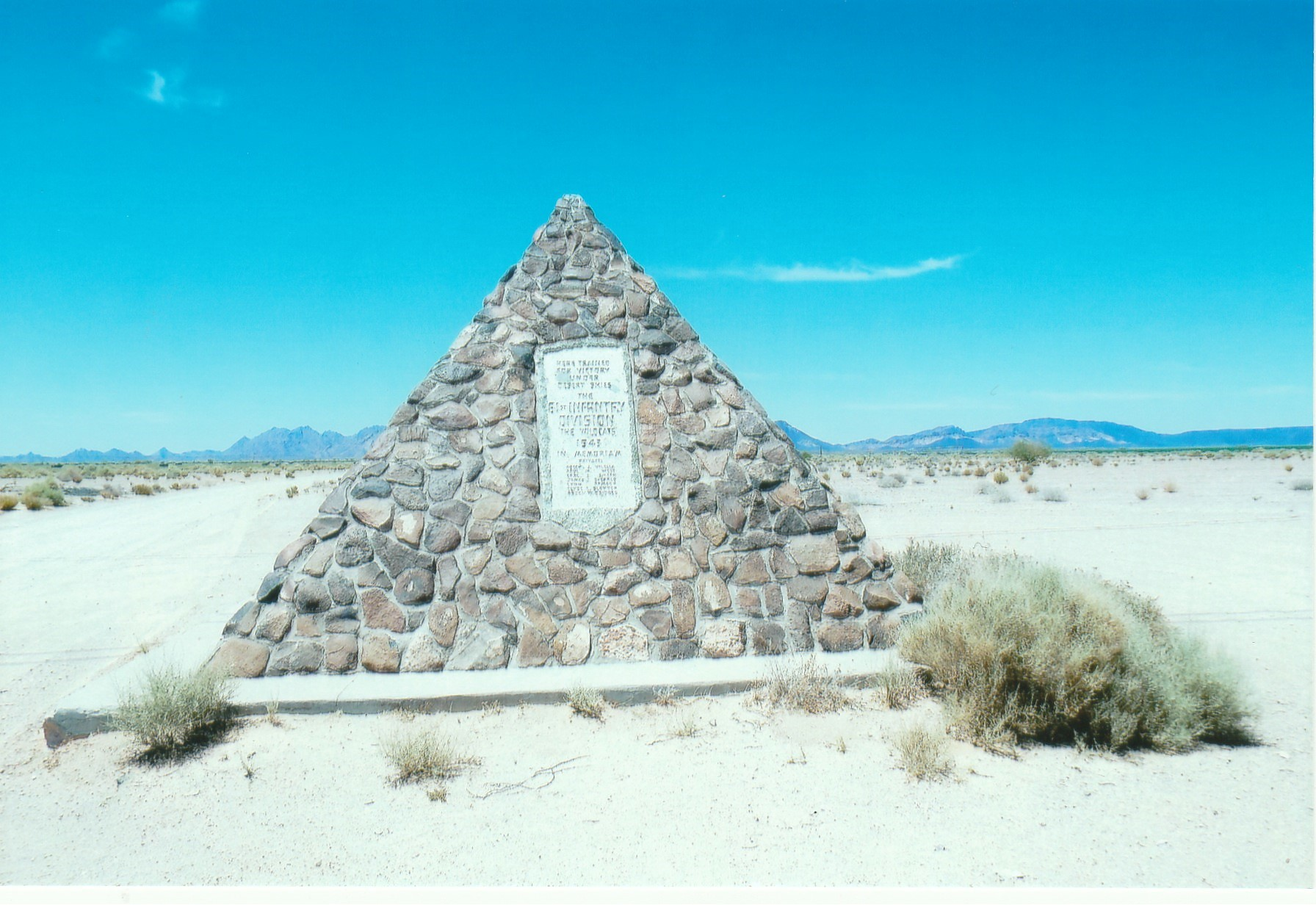
Camp Horn Monument

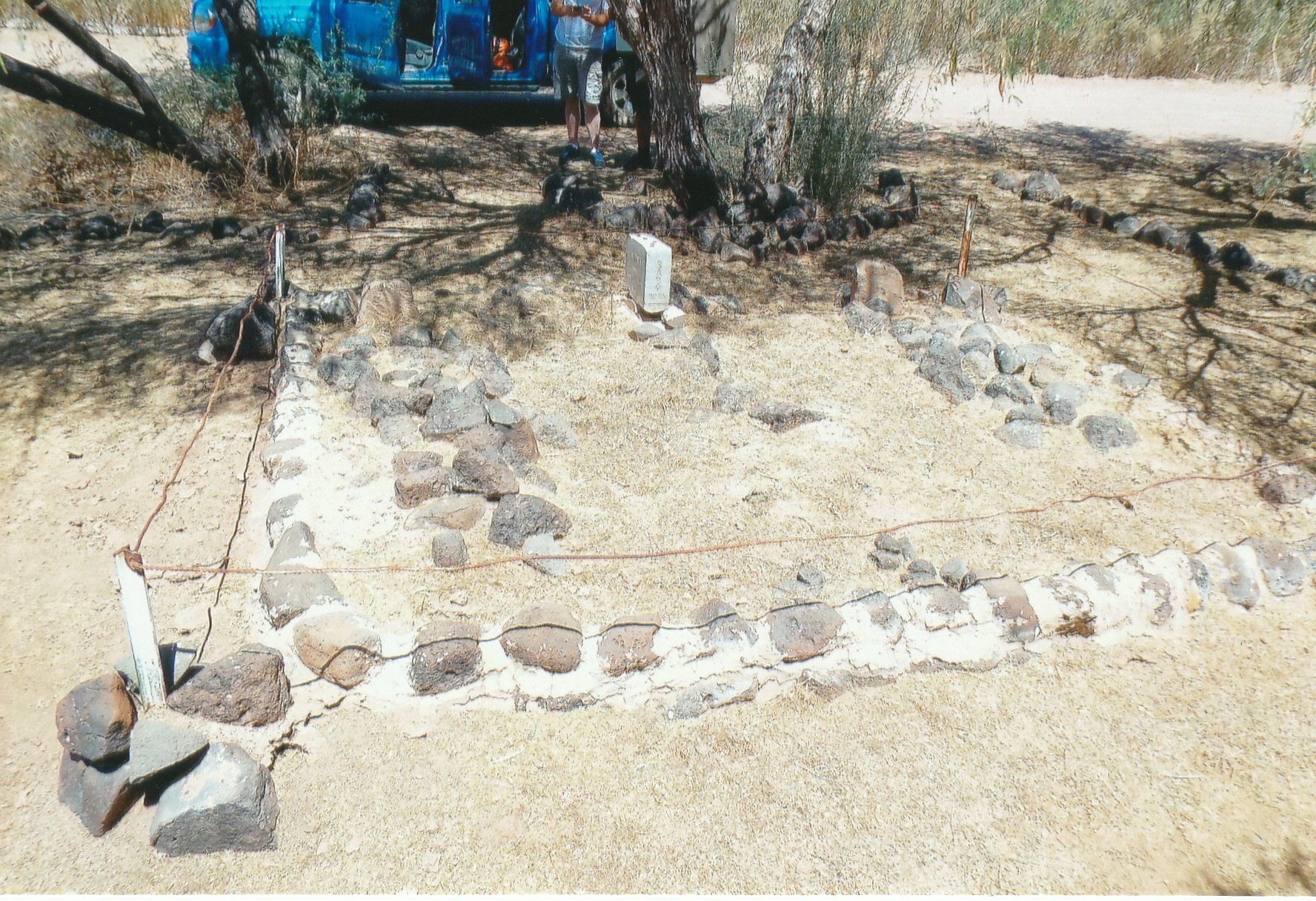
The Fourr Family Cemetery

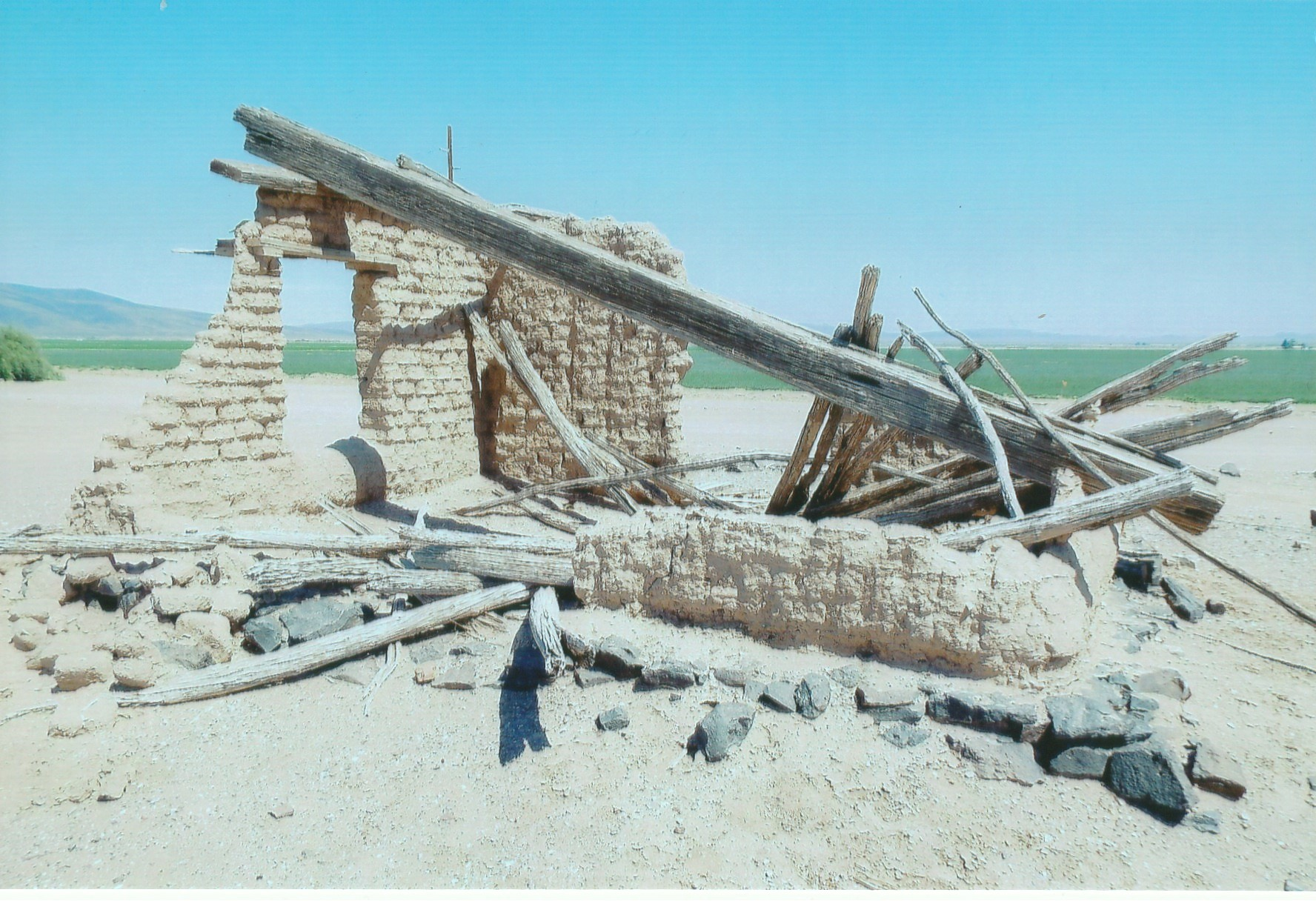
Ruins of the Southern Overland Trail stage stop station.

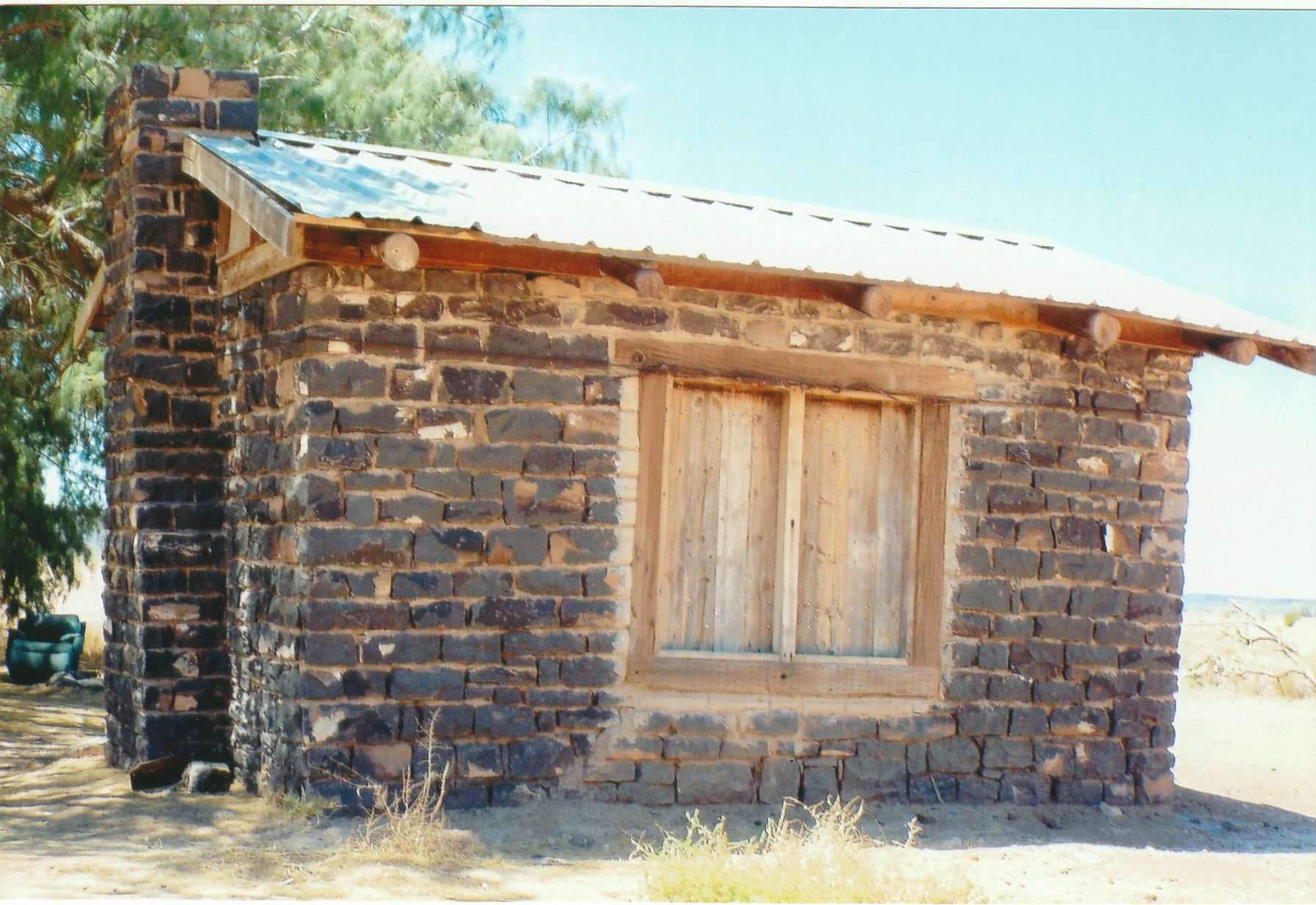
Fourr family house on Oatman Flat.

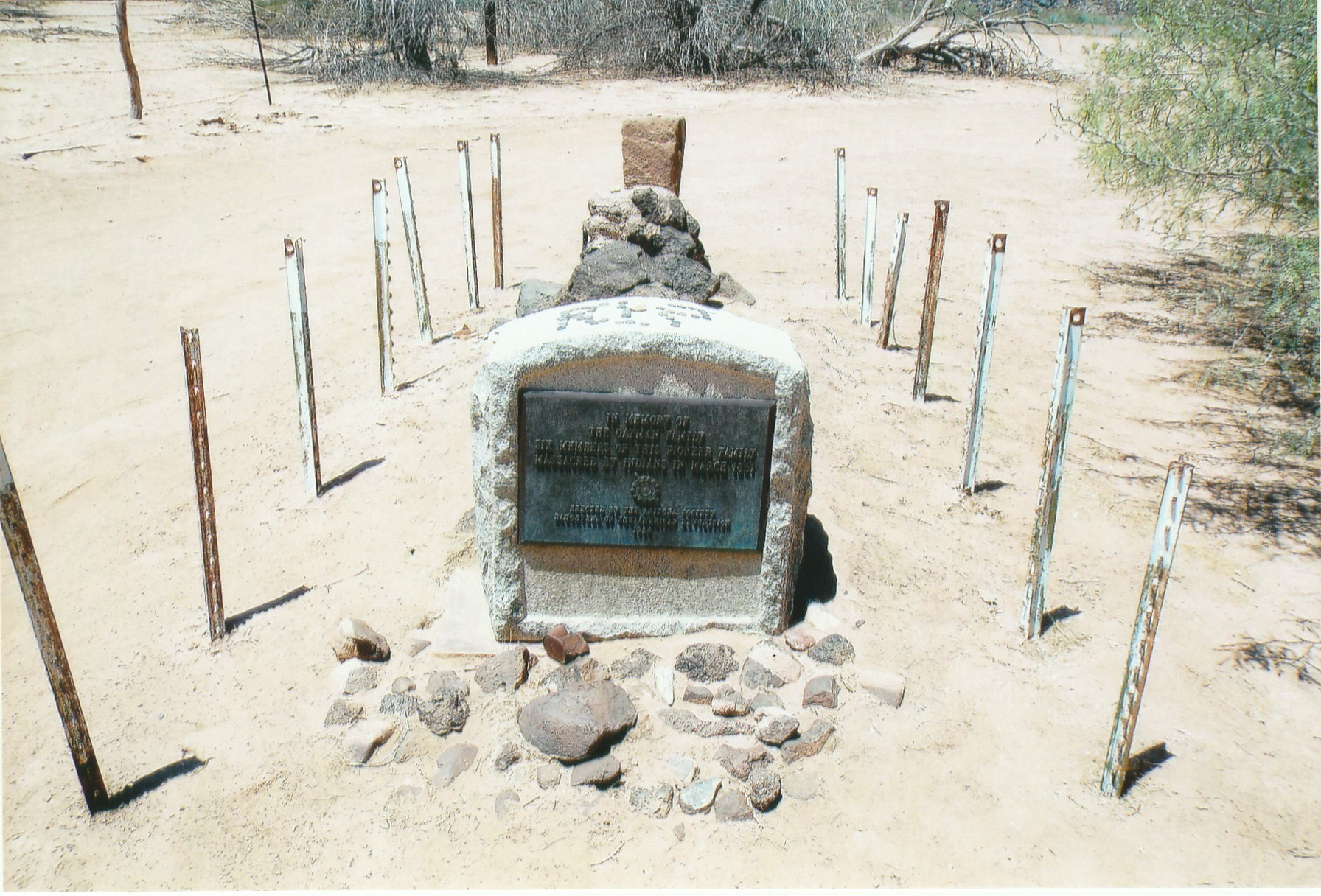
Oatman Family grave.

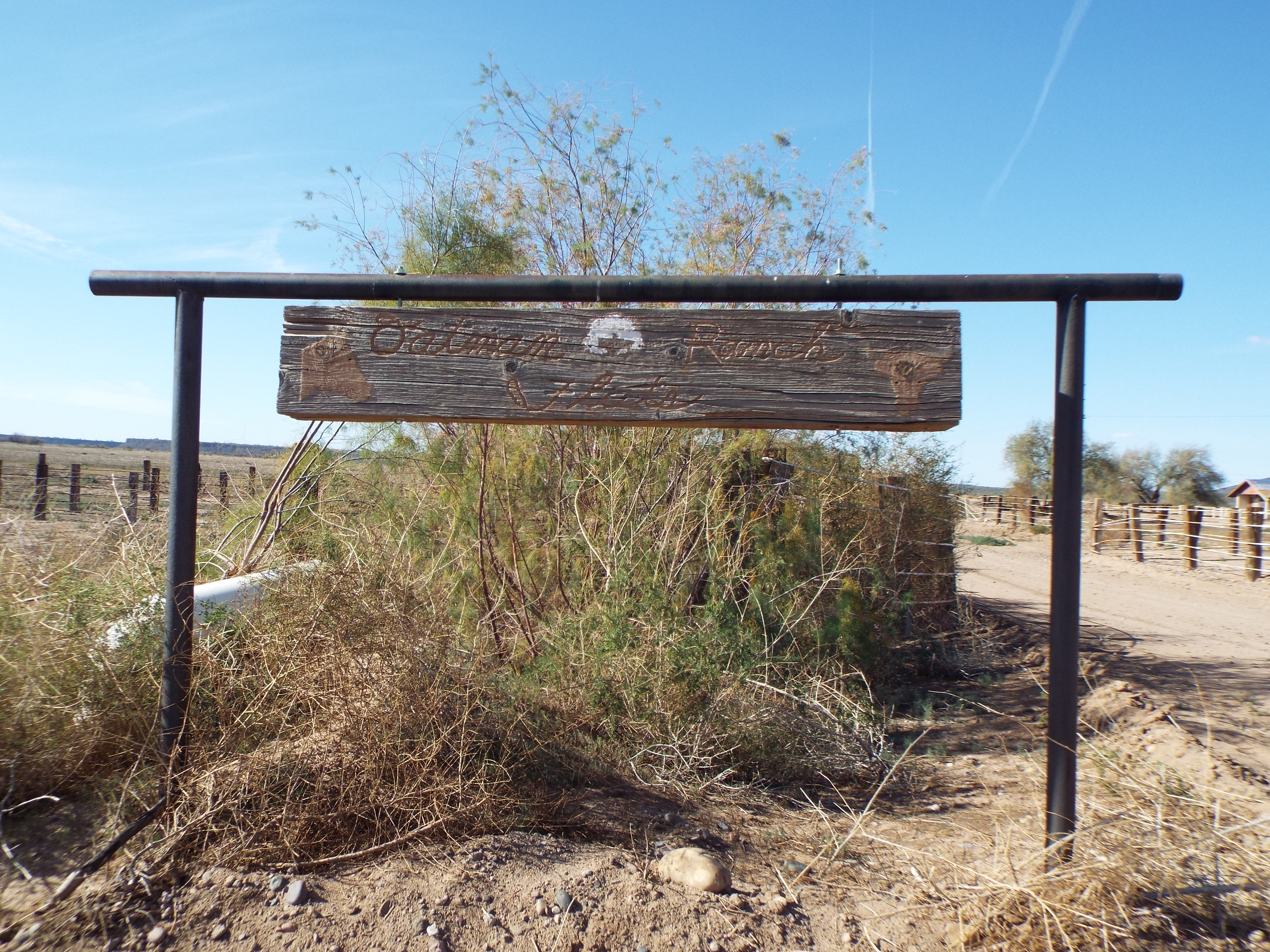
Oatman Flats Ranch

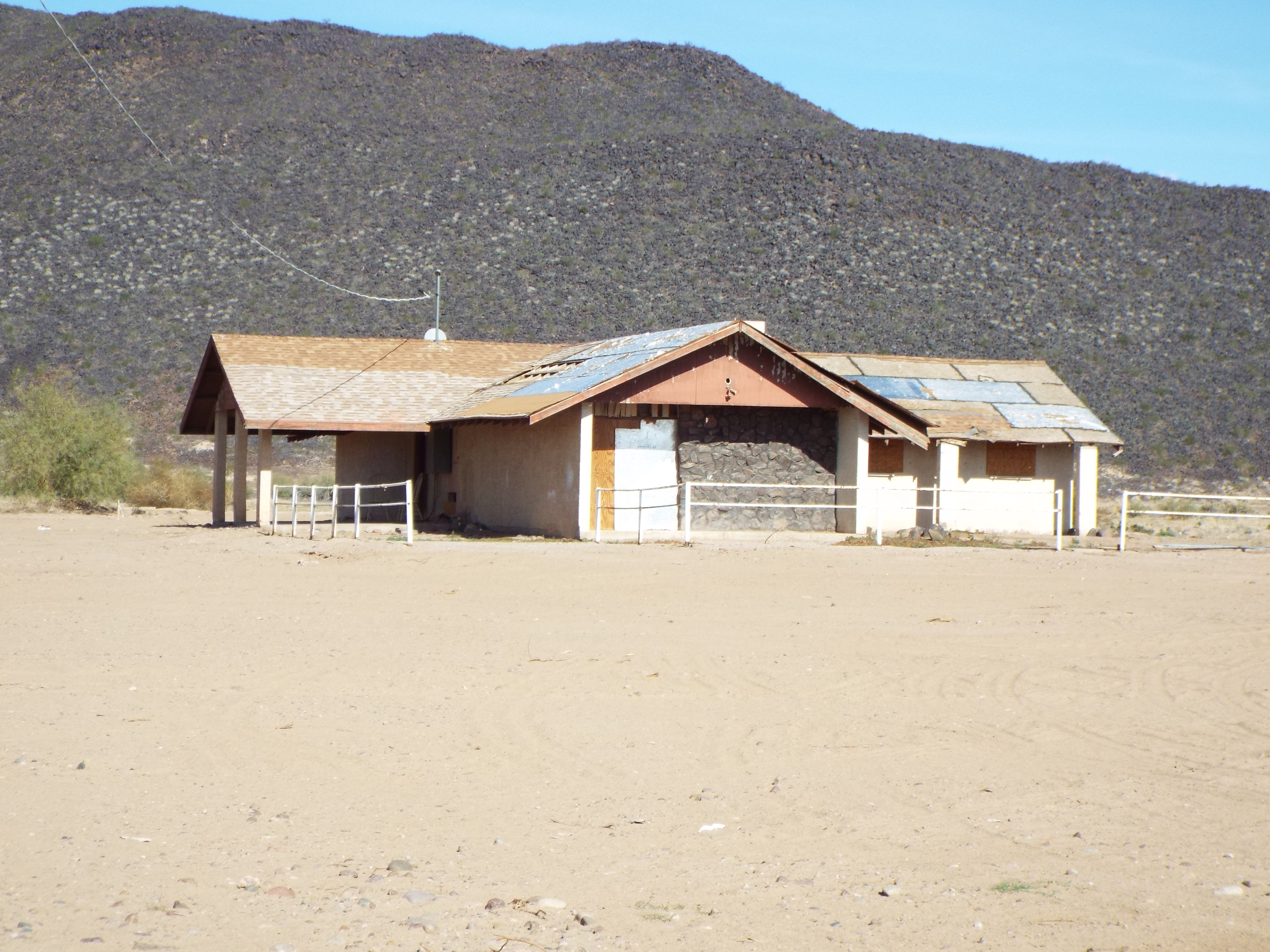
Oatman Flats Ranch House

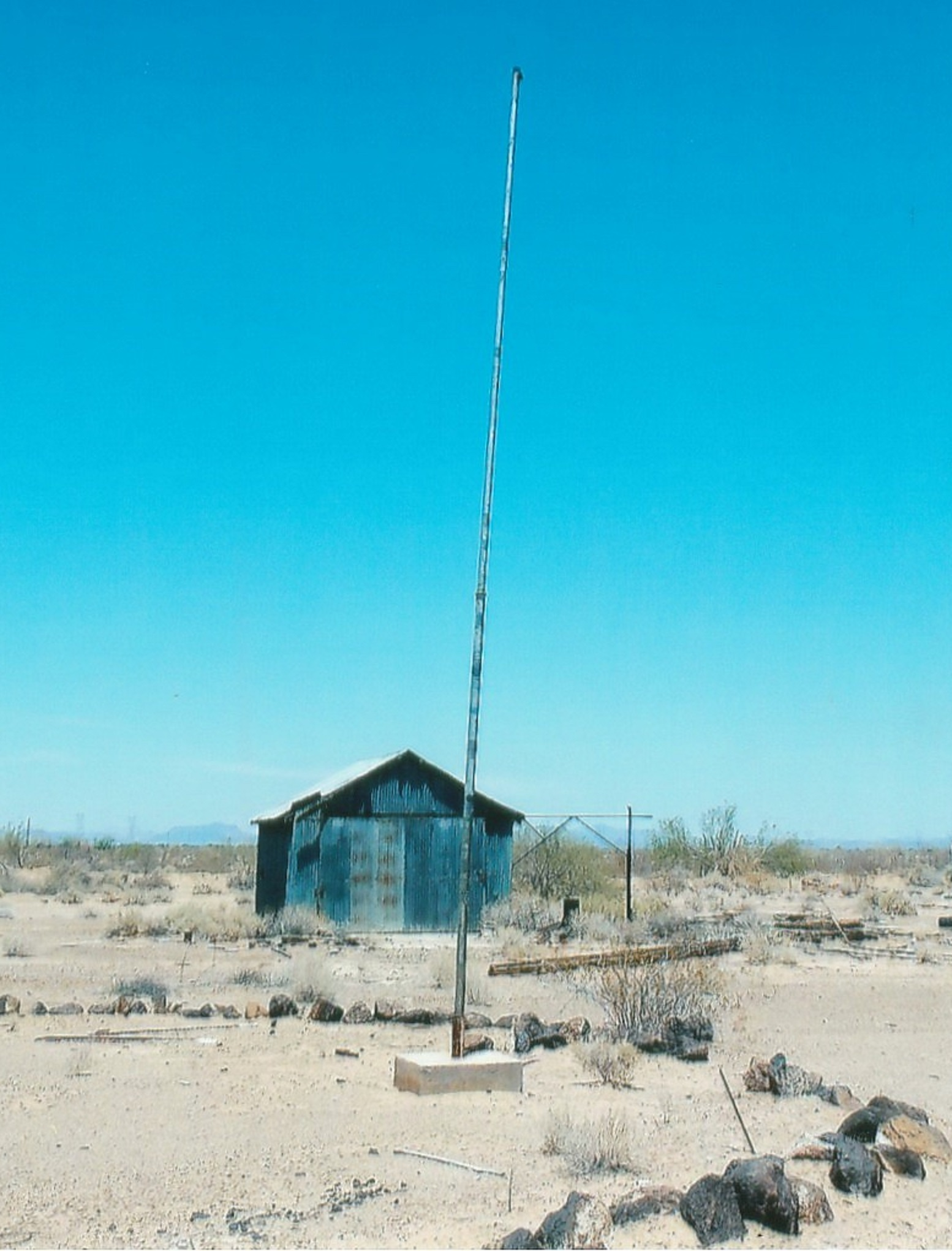
Camp Hyder flagpole.

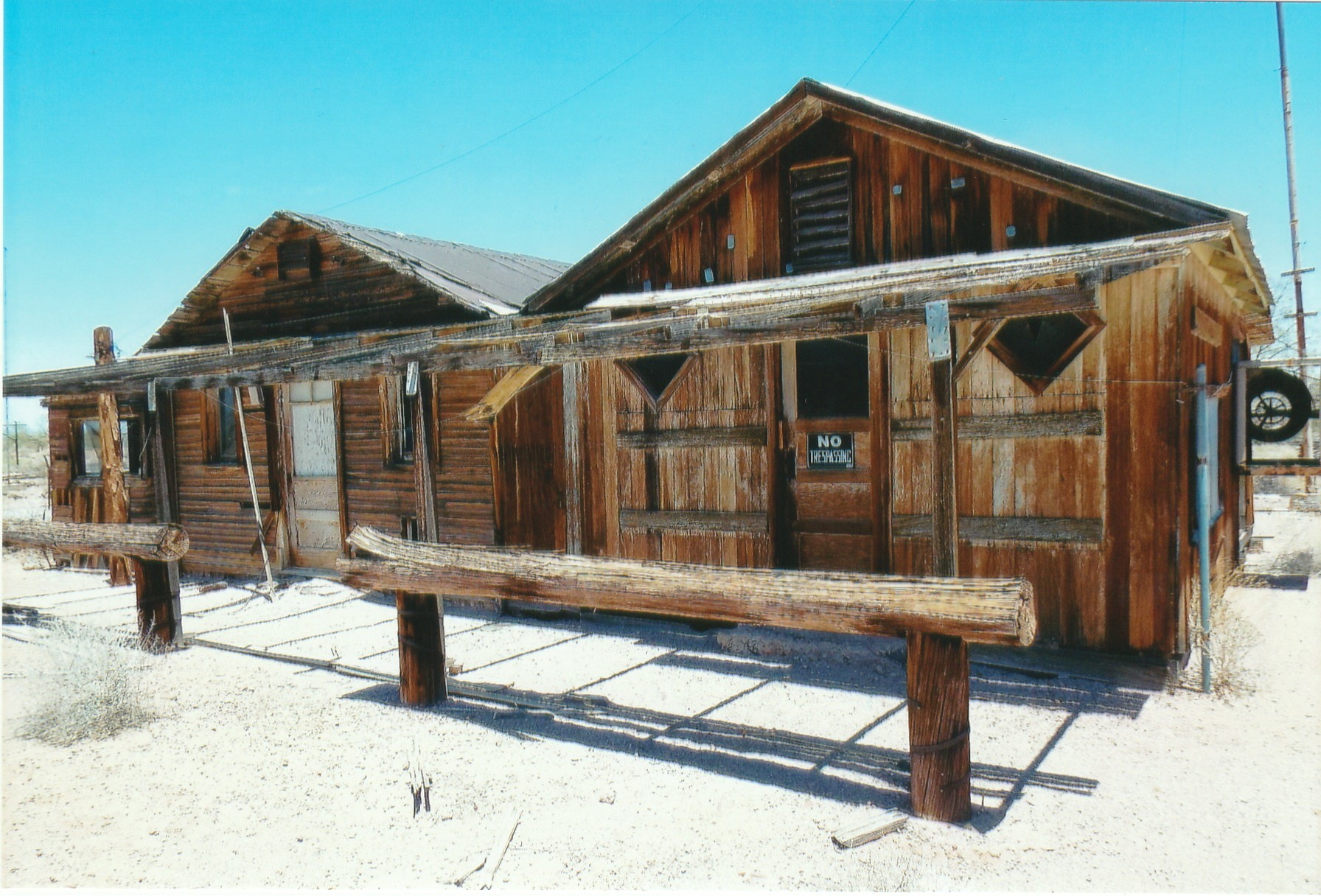
Camp Hyder 1890s structures.

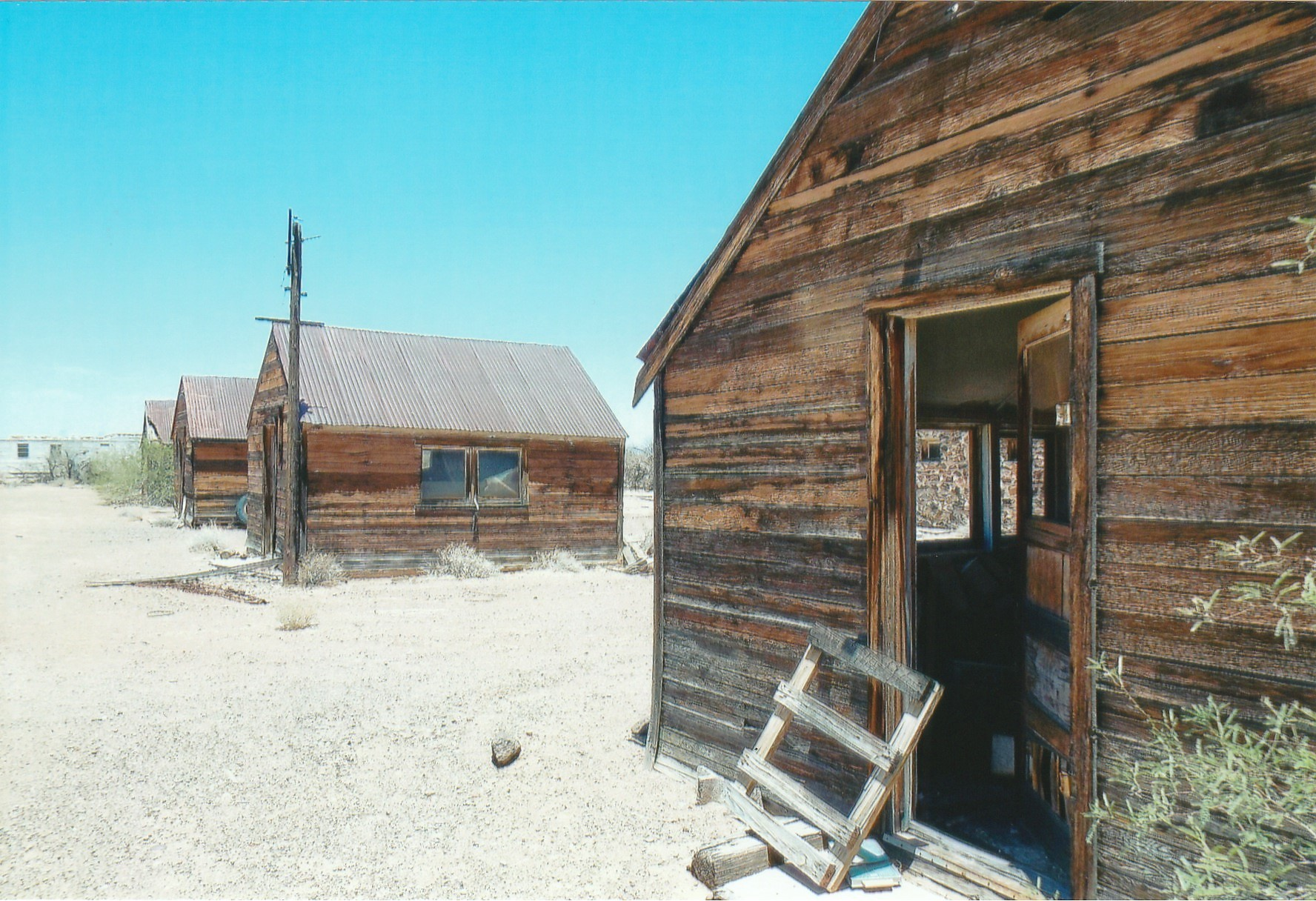
Camp Hyder structures.

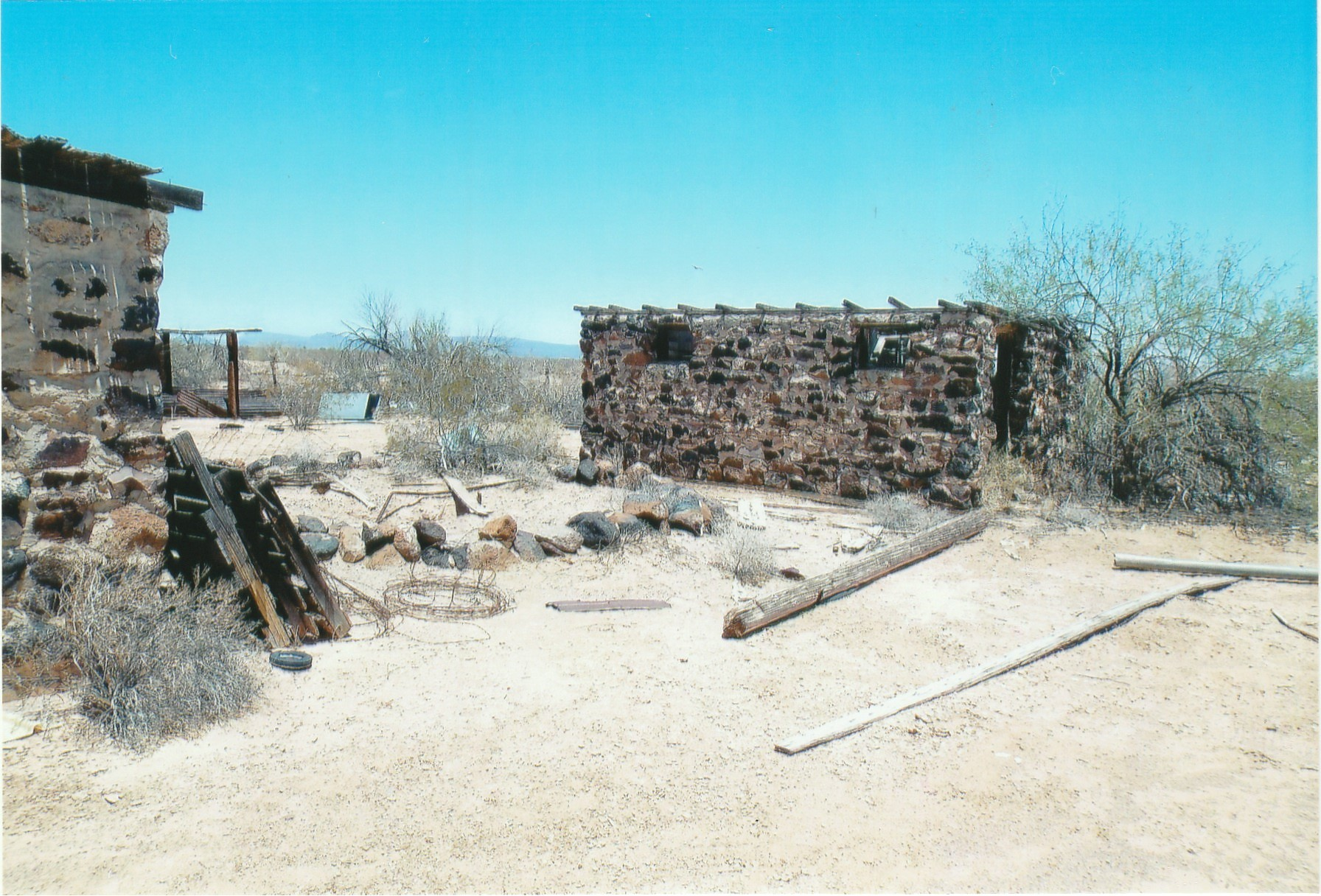
Camp Hyder structures.

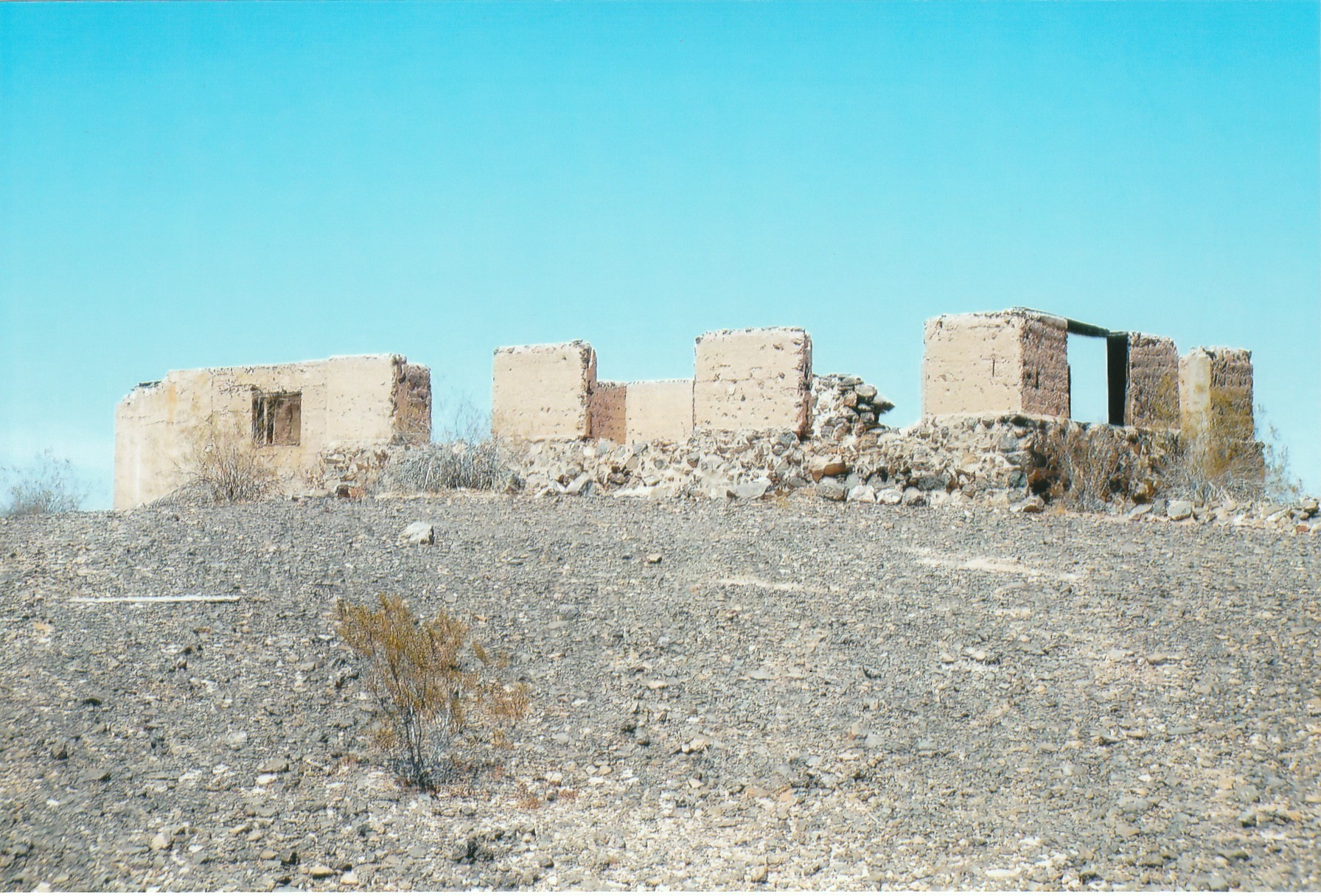
Ruins of the Nate Salsbury house.

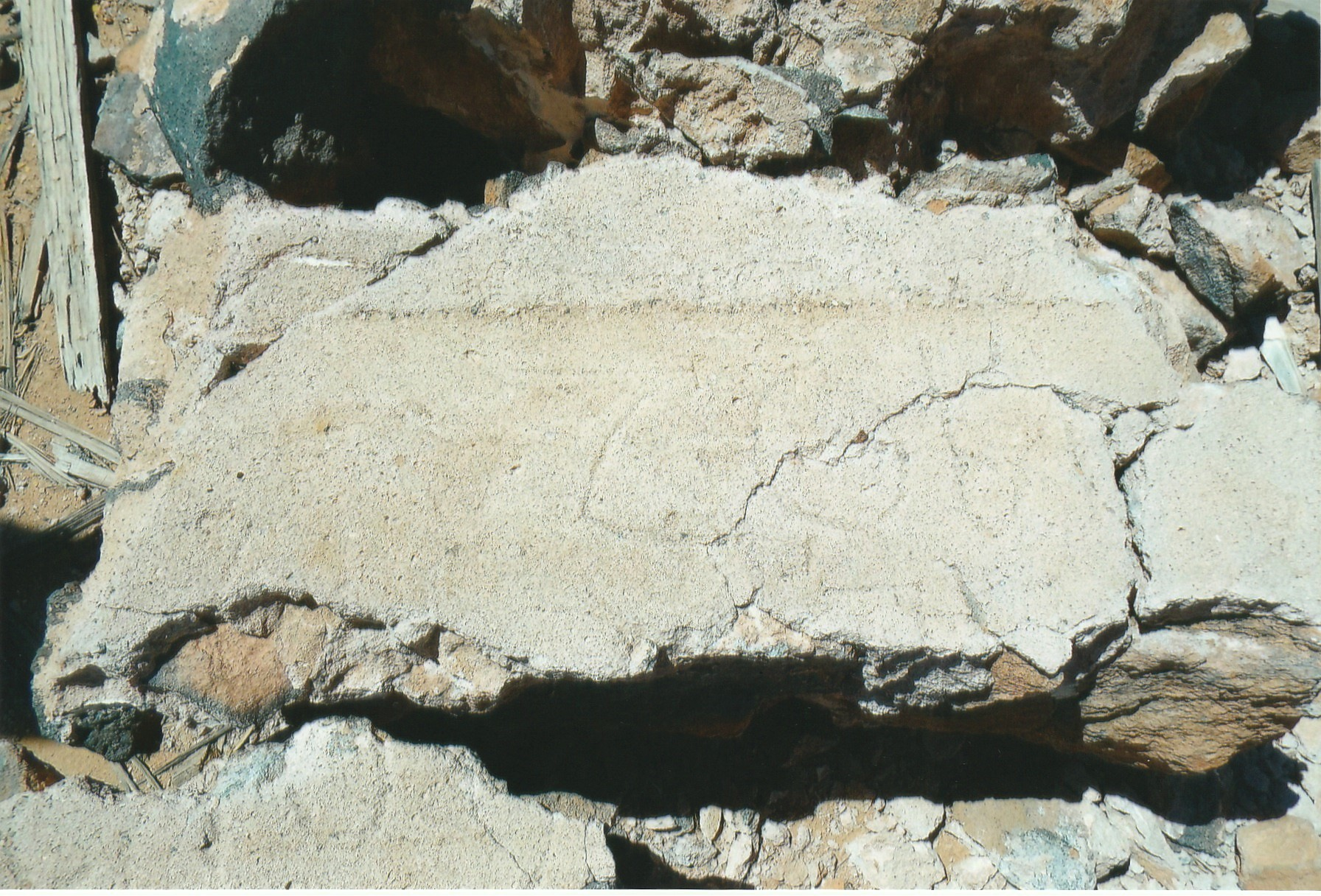
Fallen wall with "Cody" scratched on it.

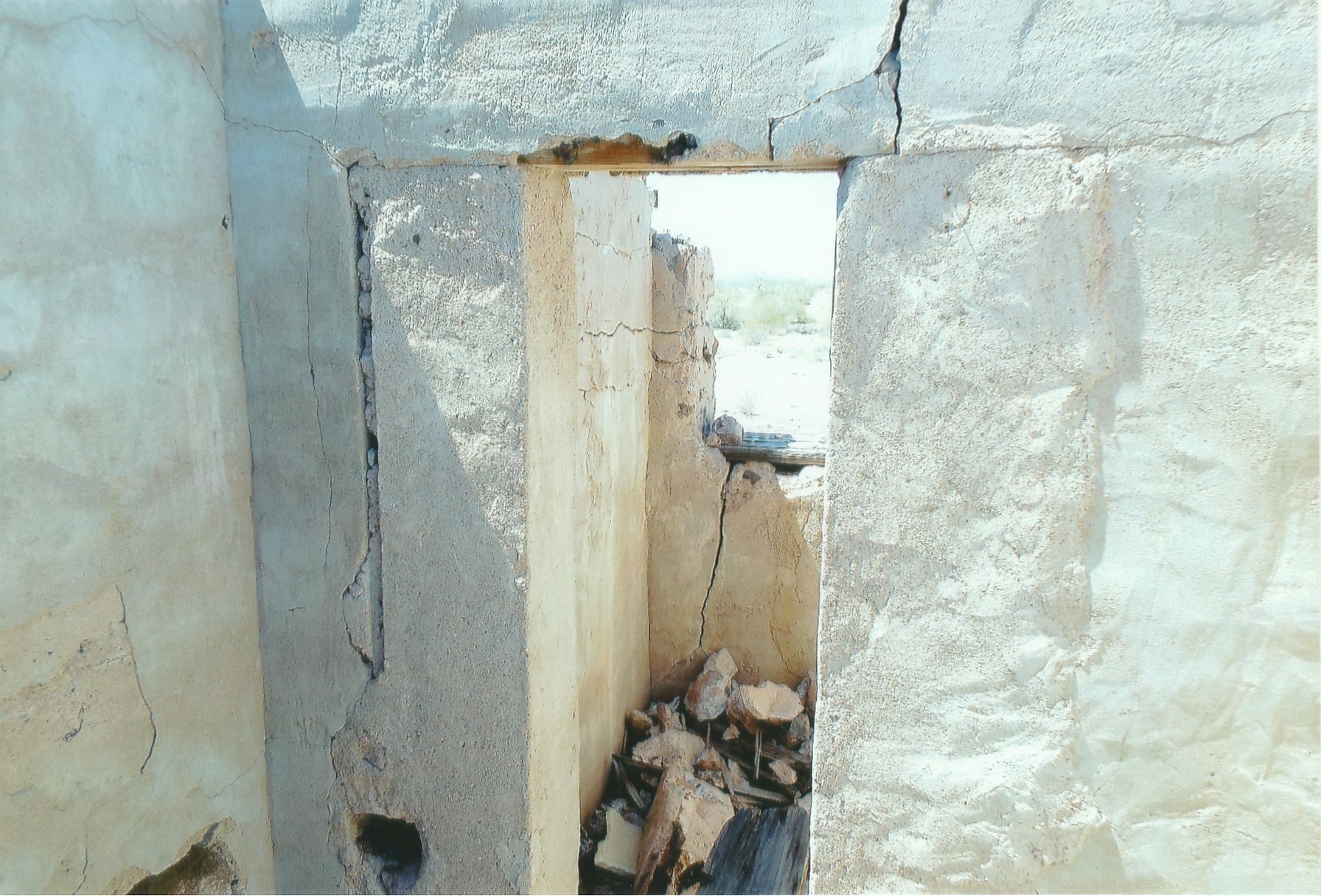
Inside the ruins of the Nate Salsbury house.

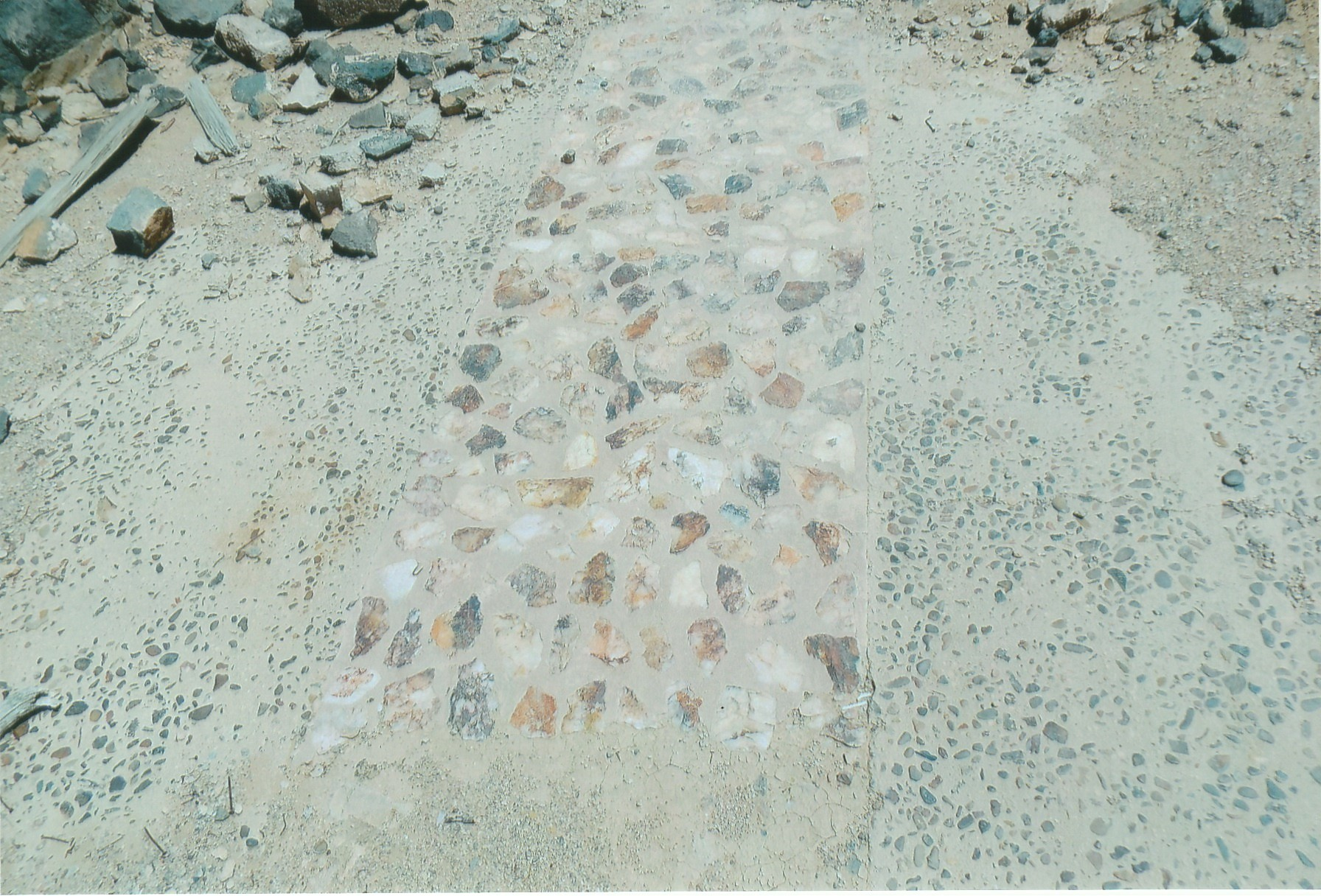
Nate Salsbury house floor.

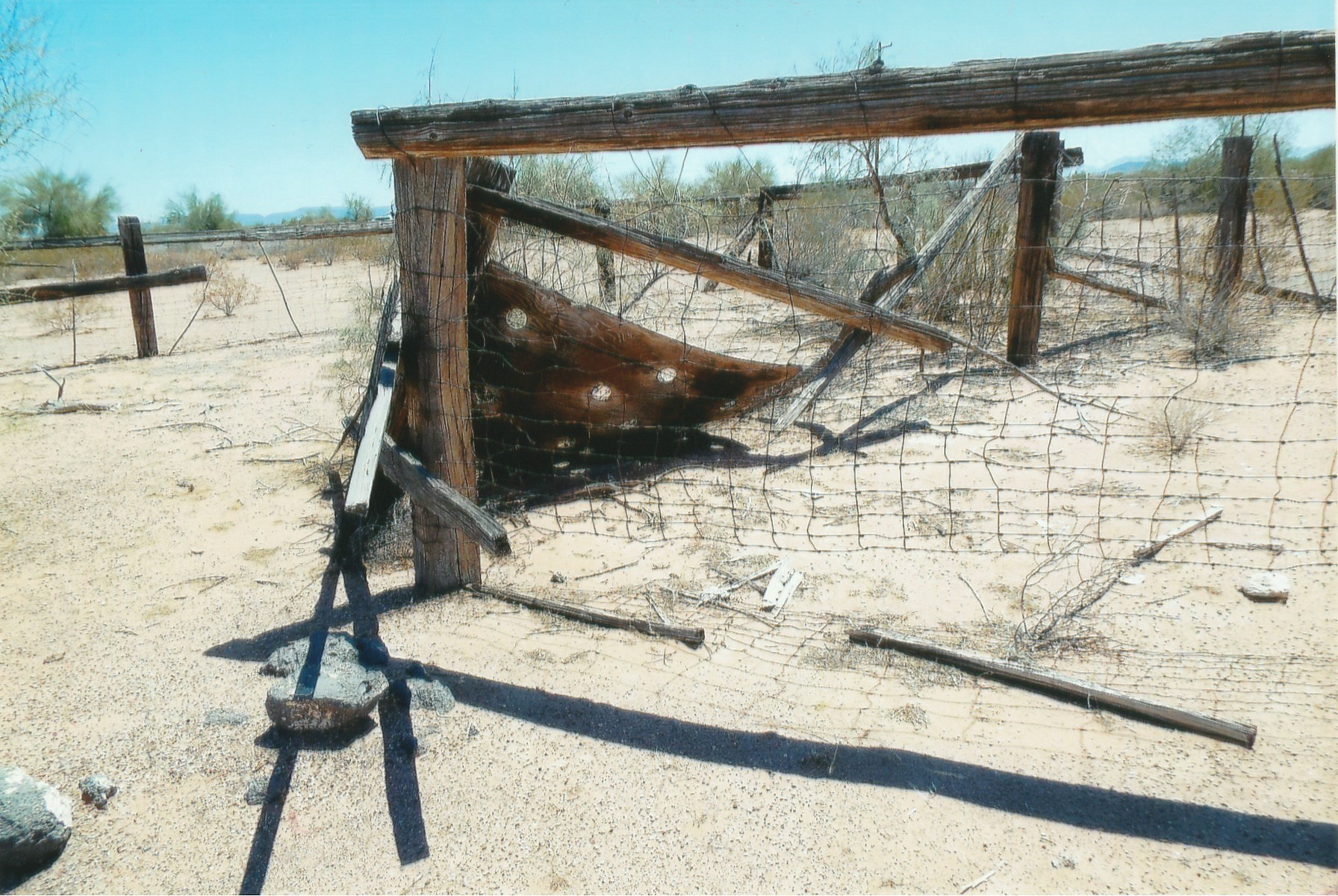
Nate Salsbury's corral.

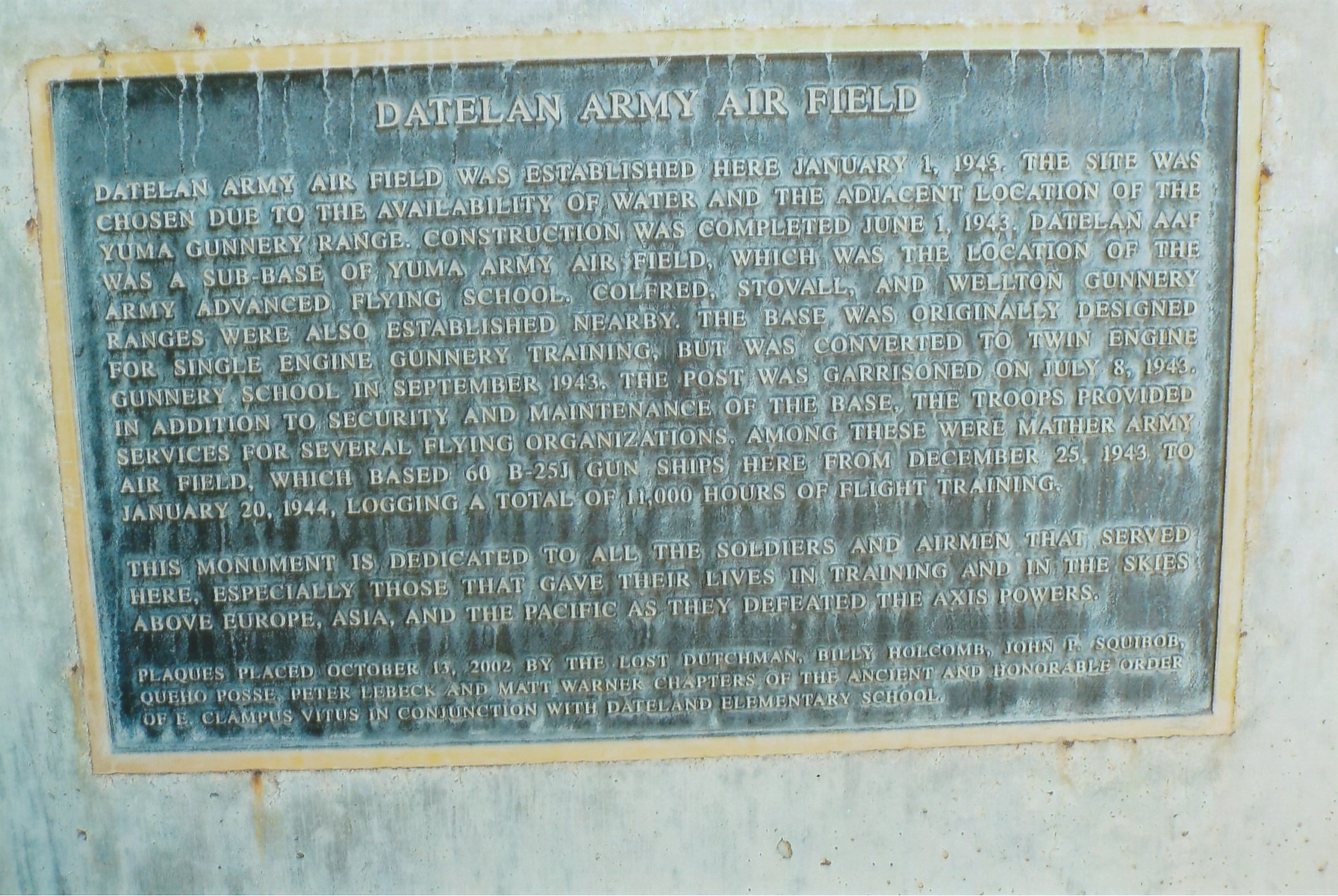
Dateland Army Air Field plaque.

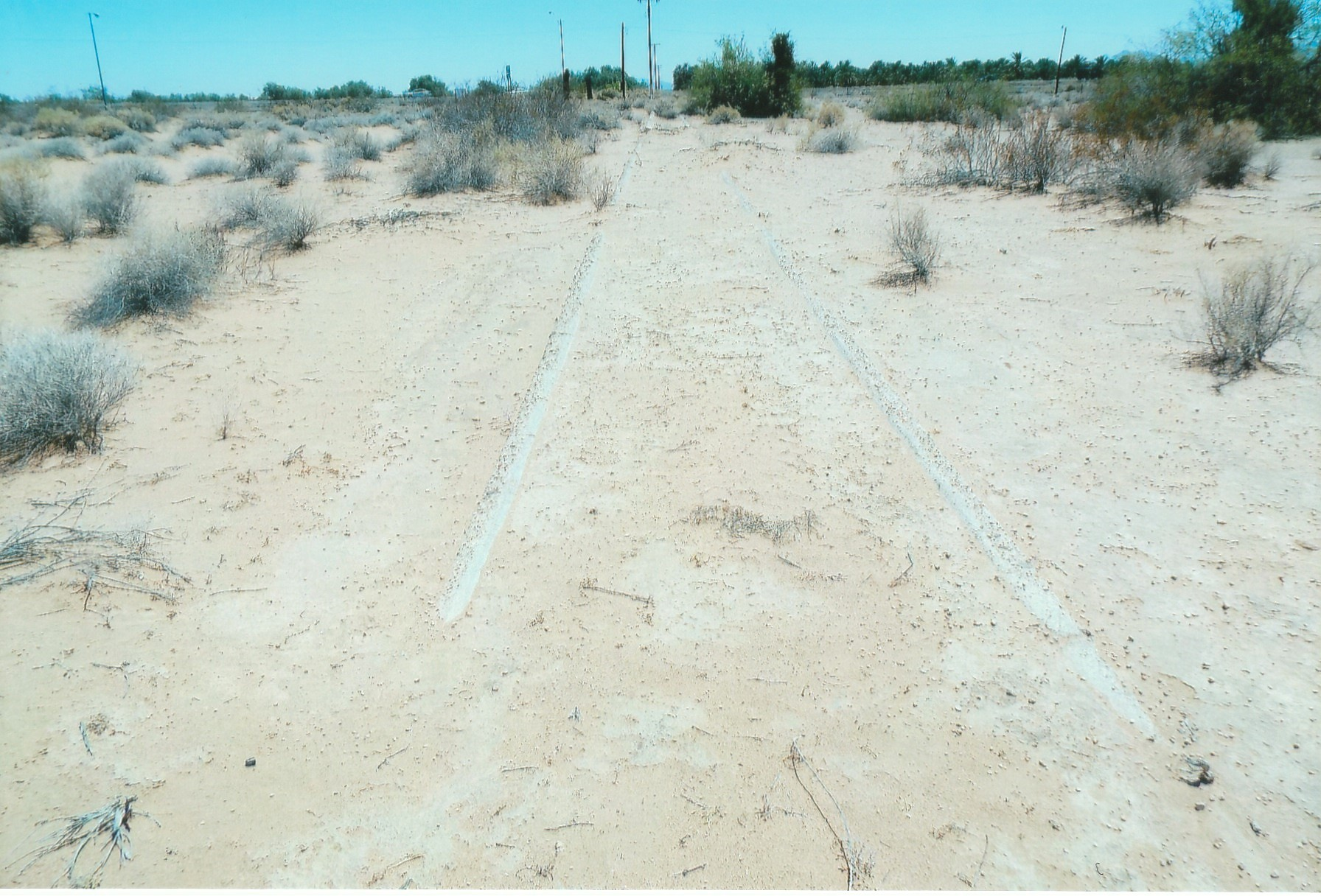
Dateland Army Air Field foundation.

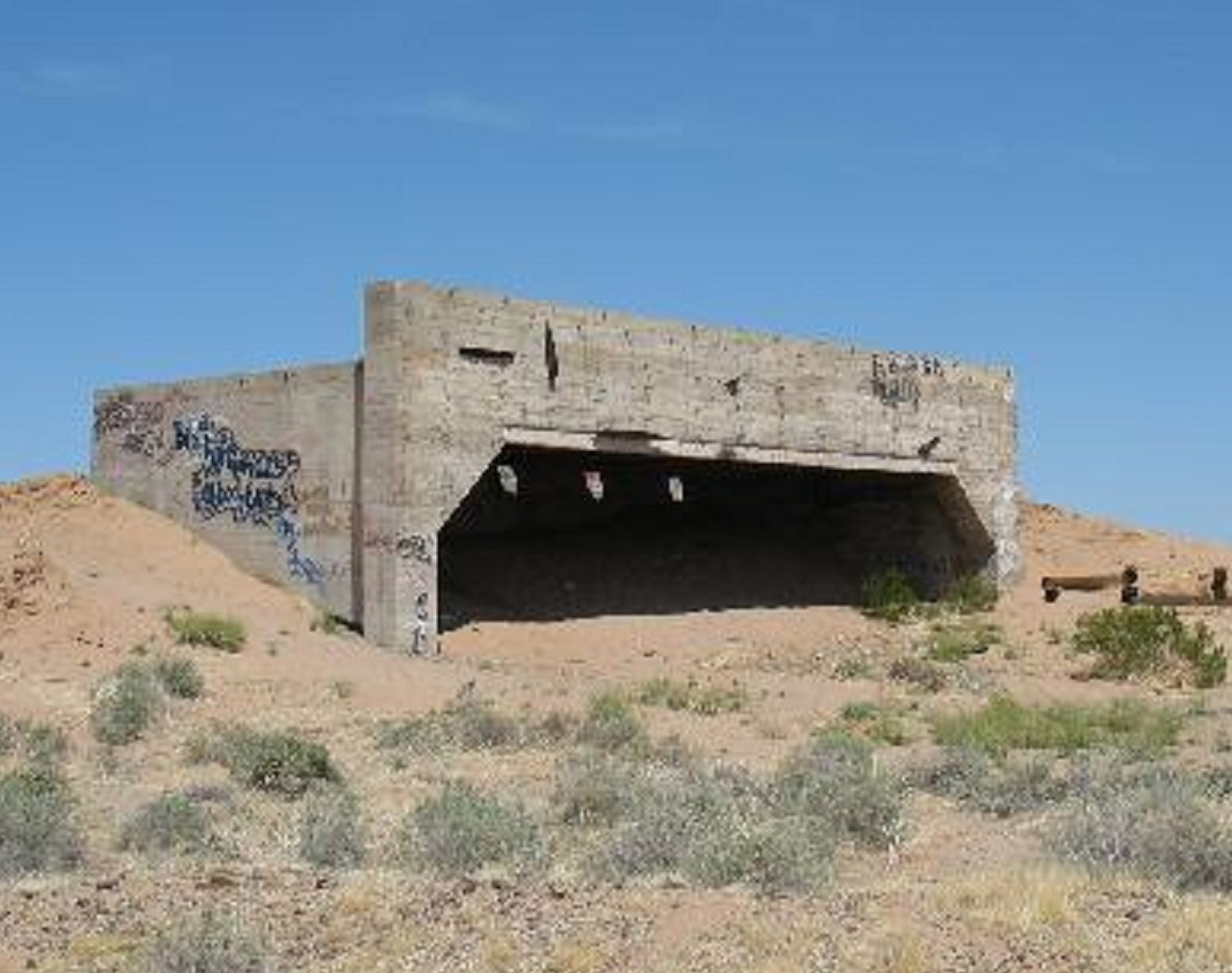
Army Air Field Concrete Bunker.

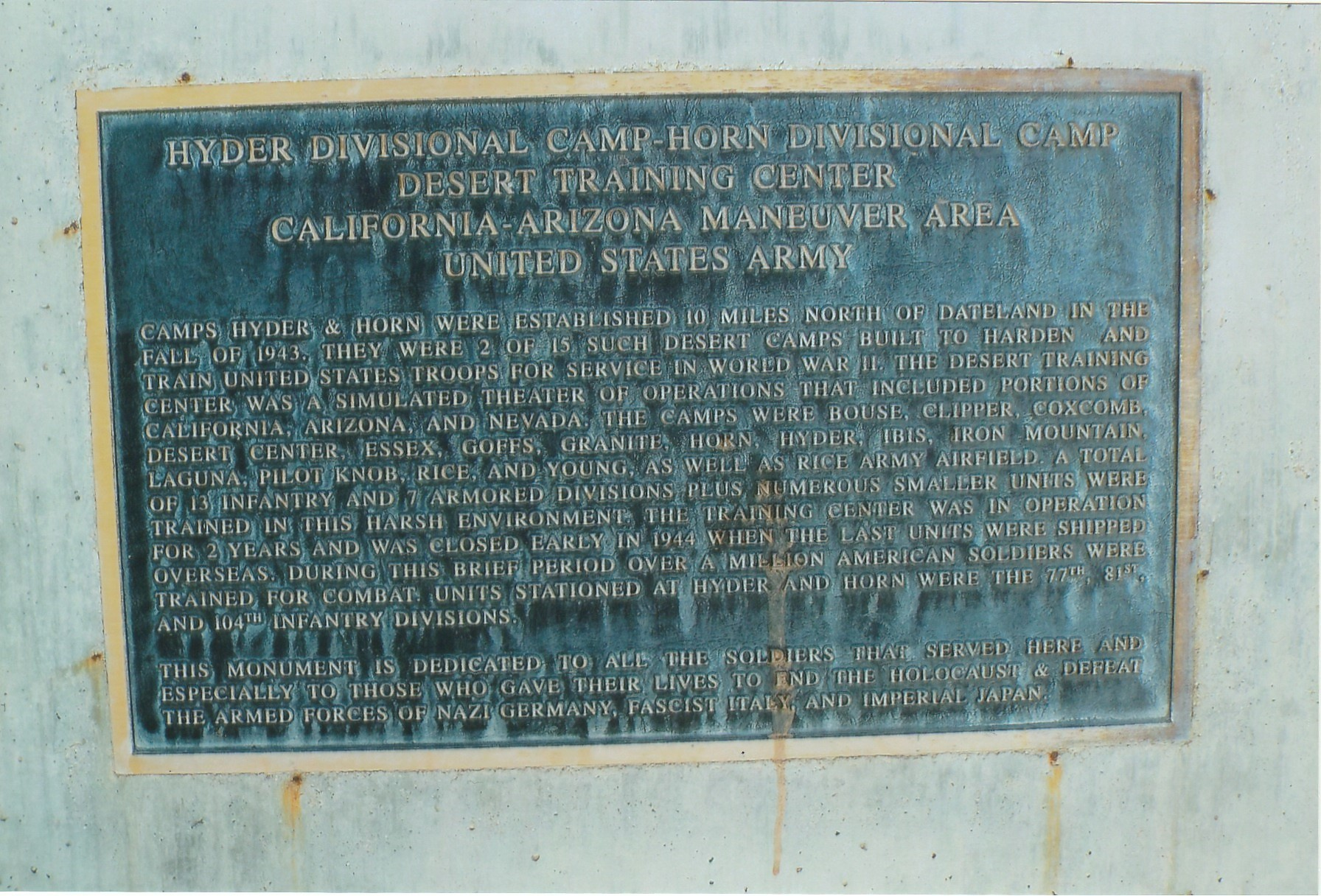
Hyder Divisional Camp-Camp Horn Divisional Camp plaque.

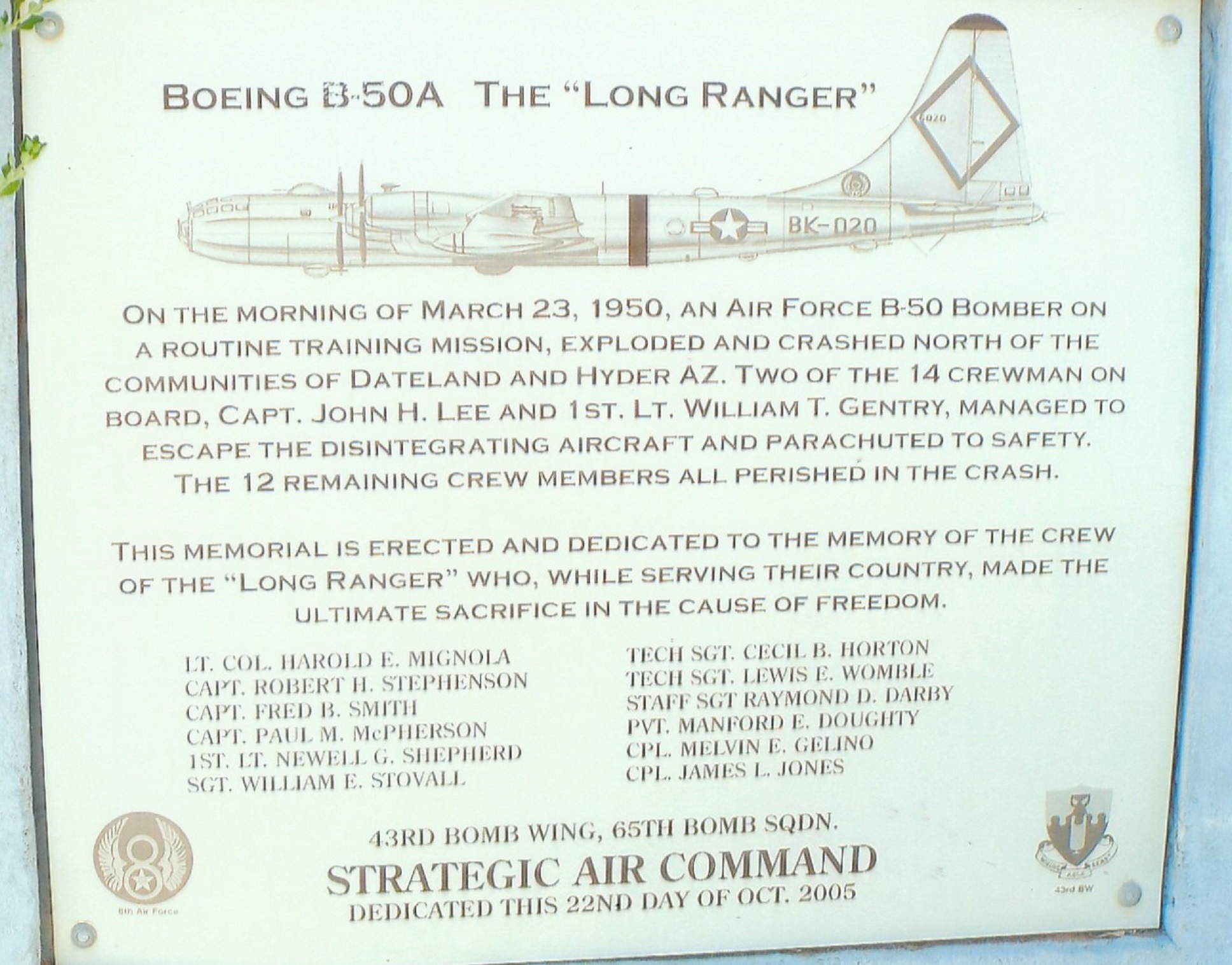
The "Lone Ranger crash site memorial plaque.

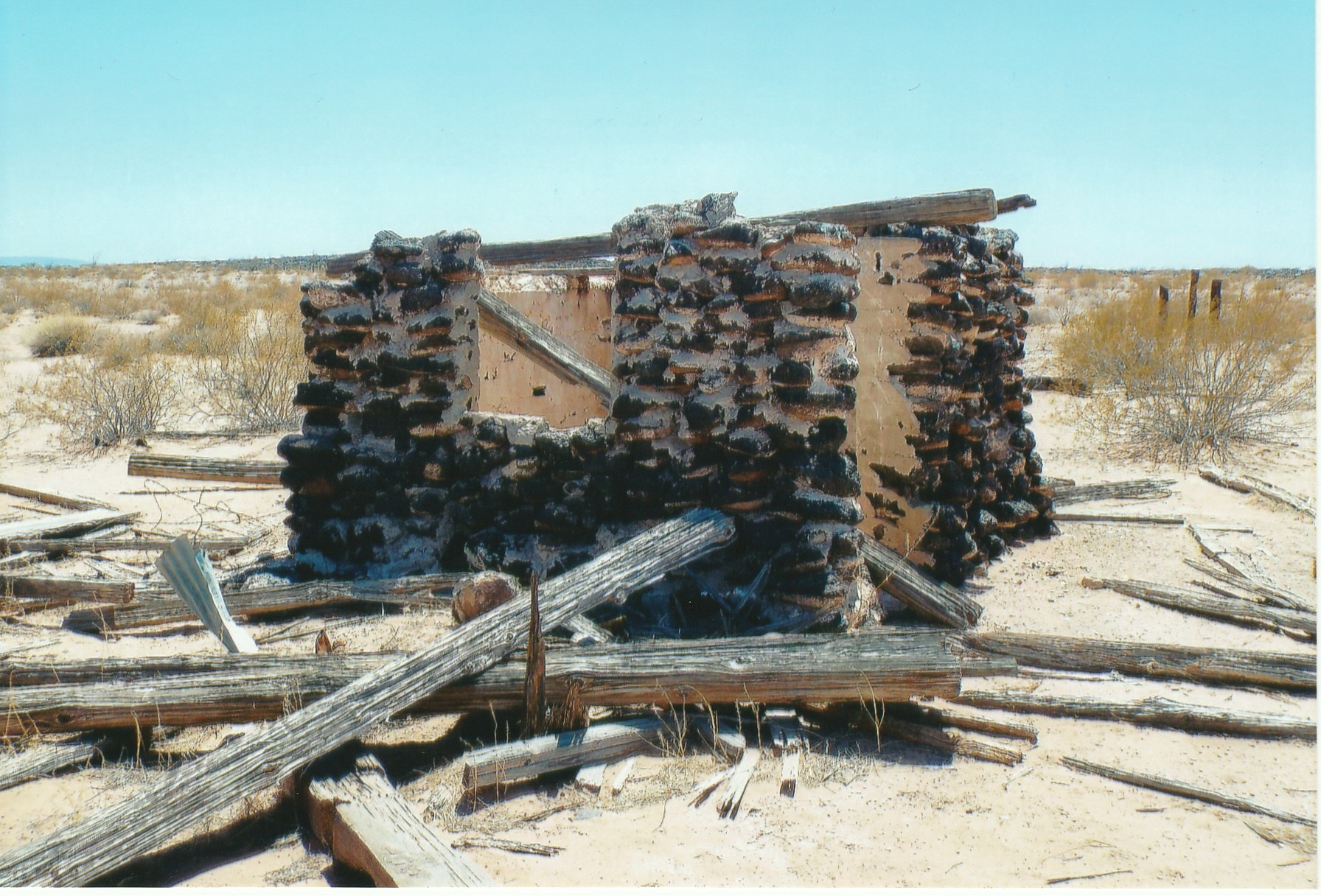
Ruins of an 1890s Ranch house in Sentinel.

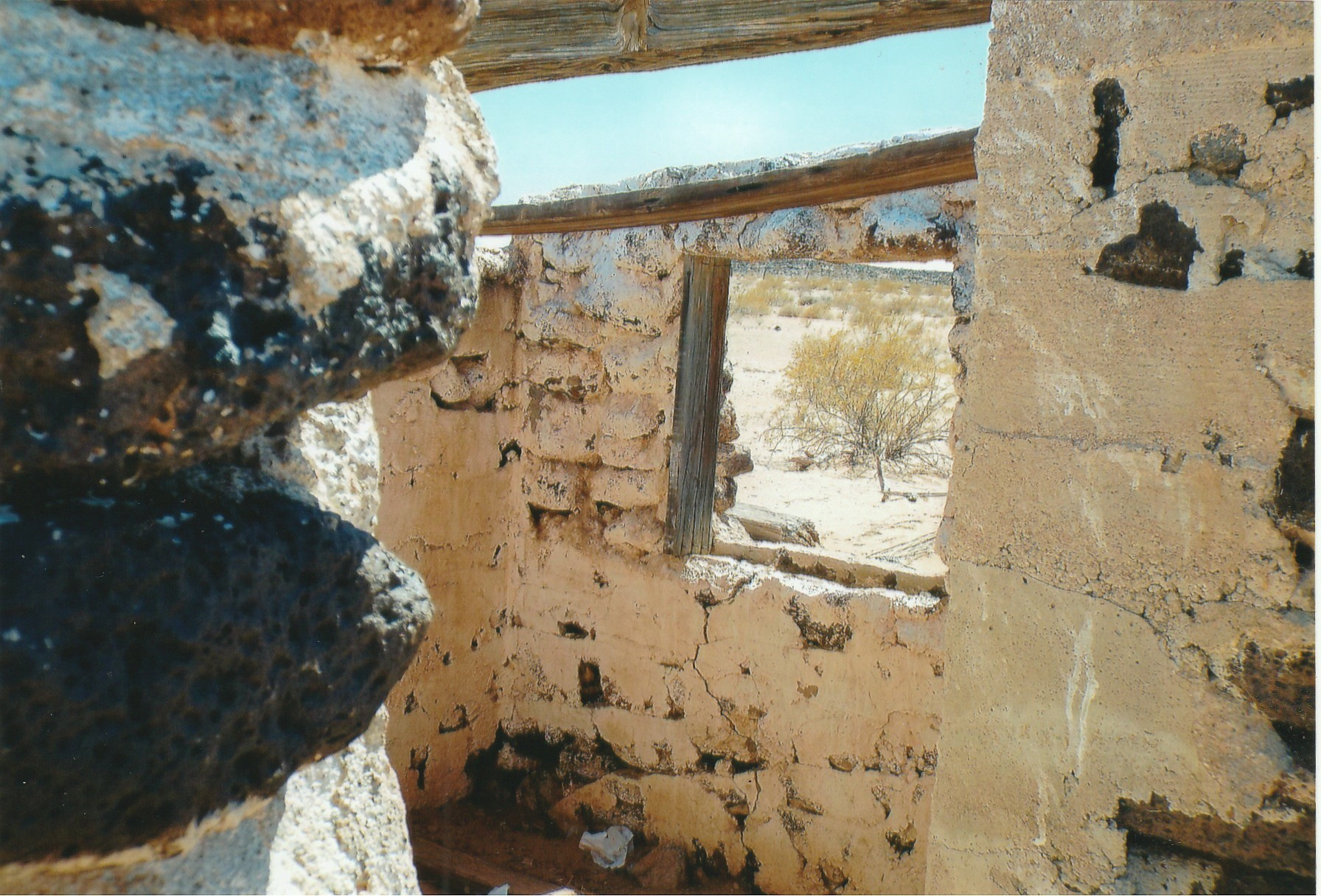
Inside the Ranch house.

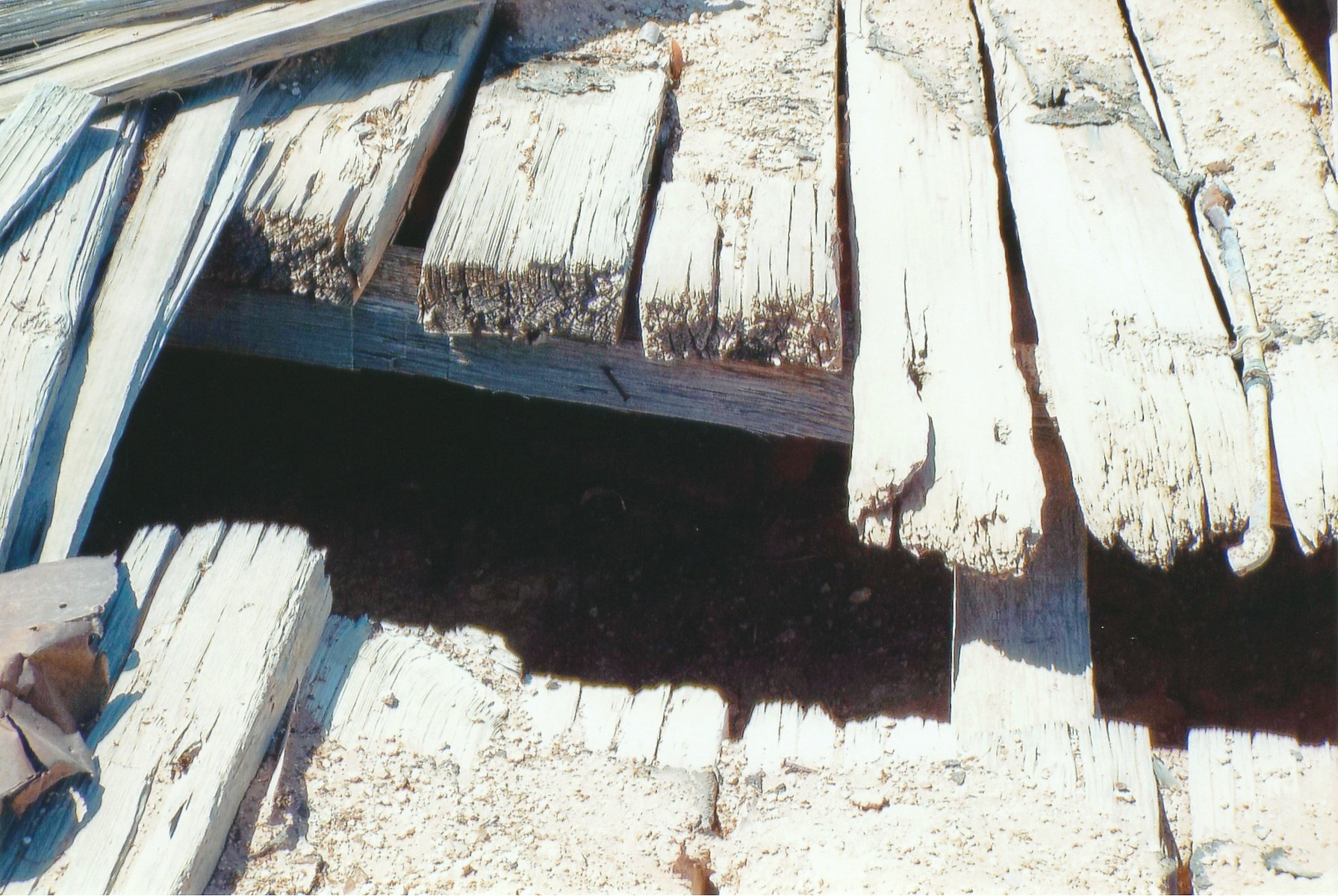
Basement of the Ranch house

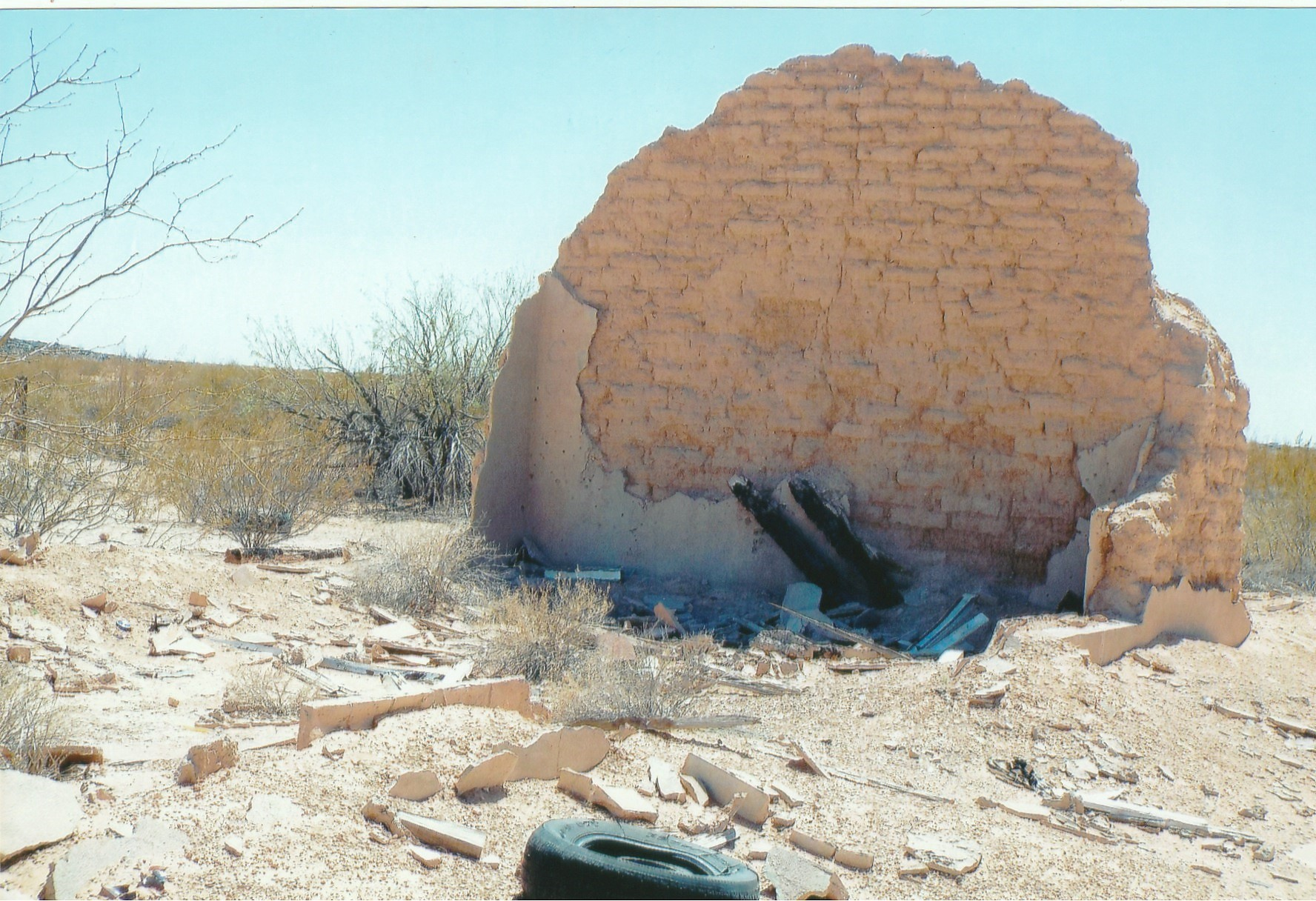
Ruins of the 1895 Sentinel Train Depot

== See also ==
- National Register of Historic Places listings in Arizona
- National Register of Historic Places listings in Yuma County, Arizona
