= Redding Regional Airport =

Municipal airport in Redding, California, United States

Redding Regional Airport Redding Army Air Field

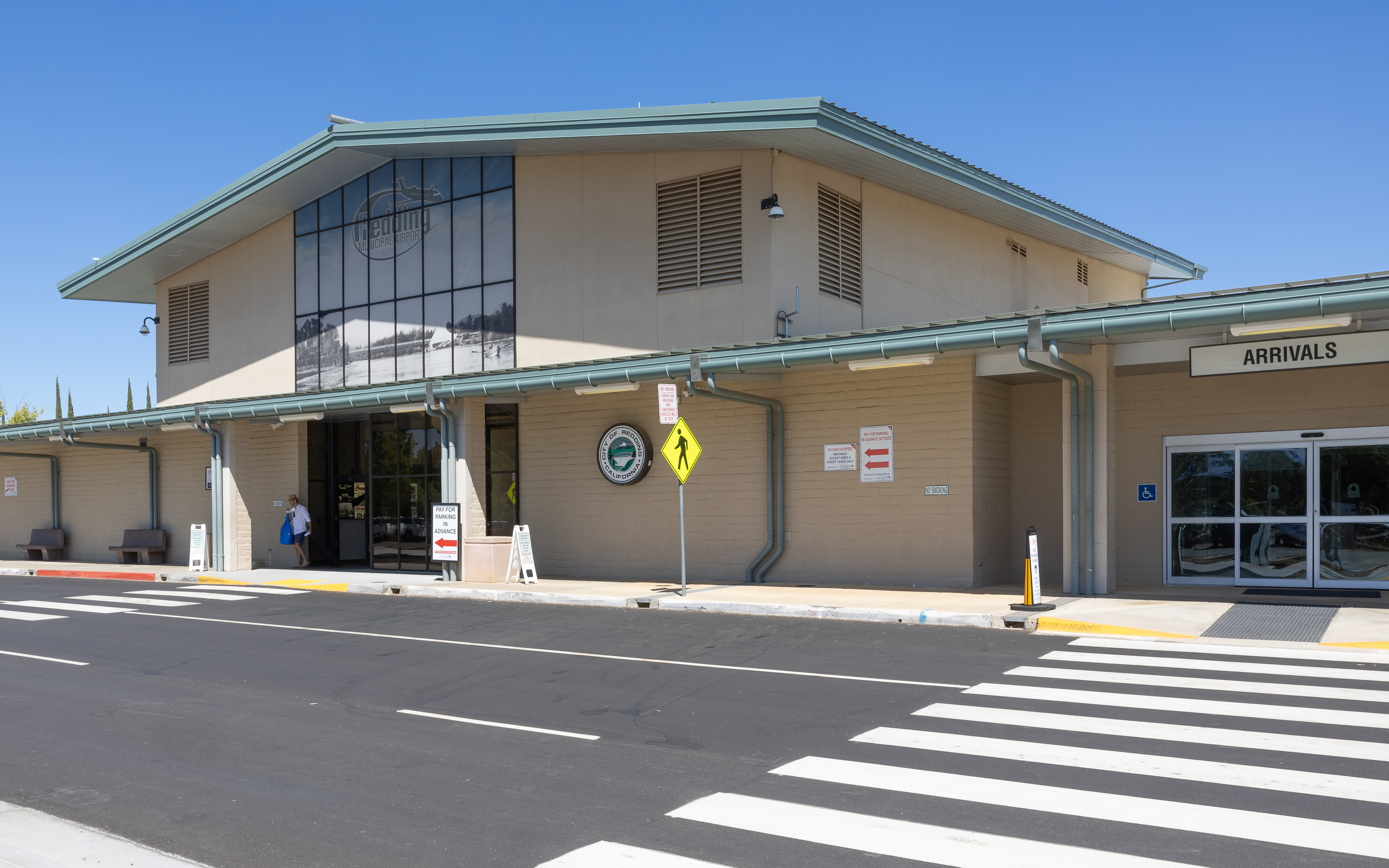
- Main entrance of the Redding Regional Airport in August 2022
- IATA: RDD; ICAO: KRDD; FAA LID: RDD; WMO: 72592

Summary
- Airport type: Public
- Owner/Operator: City of Redding
- Serves: Redding, California, U.S.
- Elevation AMSL: 505 ft (154 m)
- Coordinates: 40°30′32″N 122°17′36″W
- Website: RDD website

Maps
- FAA airport diagram
- Interactive map of Redding Regional Airport; Redding Army Air Field

Runways
Direction	Length		Surface
Direction	ft	m	Surface
17/35	7,003	2,135	Asphalt
13/31	5,067	1,544	Asphalt

Statistics (2024)
- Aircraft operations: 50,073
- Total passengers: 177,000
- Source: Federal Aviation Administration

Redding Regional Airport (IATA: RDD, ICAO: KRDD, FAA LID: RDD), formerly Redding Municipal Airport, is 6 mi (5.2 nmi; 9.7 km) southeast of Redding in Shasta County, California, United States. It is one of two airports in Redding, along with Benton Airpark. In addition to general aviation, the airport has scheduled passenger flights nonstop to and from Denver (DEN), Los Angeles (LAX), and San Francisco (SFO) on United Express Canadair CRJ200, CRJ700 and Embraer 175 regional jets, and Alaska Airlines Embraer 175 service to Seattle (SEA).

== History ==
The city wanted a new airport and put in for a Works Progress Administration project that was called the Stillwater Airfield. Before the airfield was built in 1942, the site was acquired by the United States Army Corps of Engineers for the United States Army Air Forces and built the Redding Army Airfield. Initially, this was a sub-base for Chico AAF and garrisoned by the 433d Army Air Force Base Unit. It was under IV Fighter Command at Hamiltion AAF.

The mission of Redding Army Air Field was advanced flight training of new airmen prior to their deployment overseas into the combat zones of the Pacific, China, Mediterranean or European Theaters. The USAAF 399th Fighter Squadron, 369th Fighter Group operated P-39 Airacobras from the airfield for that mission.

On November 1, 1944, control of Redding AAF was transferred from the Fourth Air Force to the Sacramento Area Command of the Army Air Forces' Air Technical Service Command headquartered at McClellan Field near Sacramento. The host unit was redesignated as the 4191st Army Air Force Base Unit. The mission was changed from training aircrews to being a refueling and maintenance facility for transient aircraft. Redding AAF was sporadically used by the Army Air Forces' Air Transport Command as a refueling and service stop.

On December 19, 1945, the military declared Redding AAF excess, and on November 18, 1946, it was turned over to the city for a civil airfield. The final transfer was in 1949, ending military ownership.

The City of Redding continues to operate the airport and has started a major commercial development.

Southwest Airways was serving the airport during the late 1940s with Douglas DC-3 service with a roundtrip routing of San Francisco–Oakland–Vallejo/Napa–Sacramento–Marysville/Yuba City–Chico–Red Bluff–Redding–Yreka–Medford operated several times a day. By 1959, Southwest Airways successor Pacific Air Lines had introduced new Fairchild F-27 turboprop flights operated on a daily roundtrip routing of Redding–Chico–Sacramento–San Francisco–San Jose–Bakersfield–Los Angeles and was also operating nonstop DC-3 service from Eureka/Arcata and Portland, Oregon. Pacific Air Lines then merged with Bonanza Air Lines and West Coast Airlines to form Air West which in 1968 was operating all of its flights from the airport with Fairchild F-27 turboprops with direct service to San Francisco, Sacramento, Fresno, Las Vegas, Portland, OR, Eureka/Arcata and Crescent City. Air West was subsequently renamed Hughes Airwest following its acquisition by Howard Hughes and in 1970 was operating all of its flights from Redding with Fairchild F-27 turboprops with nonstop and direct flights to San Francisco, nonstop flights to Chico, Eureka/Arcata and Klamath Falls, and direct flights to Sacramento, Portland, OR, Seattle and Santa Barbara.

Historical jet service included Hughes Airwest (formerly Air West) with Douglas DC-9-10s and McDonnell Douglas DC-9-30s to San Francisco (SFO), Los Angeles (LAX), Portland, OR (PDX), and Seattle (SEA). Frontier Boeing 737-200s flew to Denver (DEN) via Sacramento (SMF). United Airlines flew 737s nonstop and direct to San Francisco (SFO) for several years starting in 1983. Pacific Express BAC One-Elevens flew nonstop to San Francisco (SFO) and on to Los Angeles (LAX) and also to Portland (PDX). In addition, American Eagle service operated by Wings West on behalf of American Airlines, using Fairchild Swearingen Metroliner (Metro III) commuter turboprops, flew nonstop to San Jose (SJC), San Francisco (SFO), Eureka/Arcata (ACV), and Klamath Falls (LMT) at various points until late 1993.

According to the Official Airline Guide (OAG), three airlines were serving the airport in 1995 including Alaska Airlines wholly owned subsidiary Horizon Air with de Havilland Canada DHC-8 Dash 8 and Dornier 328 turboprop service nonstop from Eureka/Arcata (ACV) and Portland (PDX) as well as direct from Seattle (SEA), Reno Air Express operated by Mid Pacific Air on behalf of Reno Air with British Aerospace BAe Jetstream 31 turboprop service nonstop from Chico (CIC), Medford (MFR), Reno (RNO), Sacramento (SMF) and San Jose (SJC), and United Express operated by WestAir Airlines on behalf of United Airlines with Embraer EMB-120 Brasilia turboprop service nonstop from San Francisco (SFO). By 1996, Sierra Expressway was operating nonstop BAe Jetstream 31 turboprop service to Oakland (OAK).

On July 17, 2008, President George W. Bush and his staff landed at Redding in Air Force One to allow the president to see the damage done by wildfires.

On June 3, 2016, Donald Trump held a campaign rally on the airport tarmac.

On June 25, 2024, Avelo Airlines announced it would end flights to and from Redding with its Redding-Burbank route after the ground handler that provides logistical operations for the airline pulled out of California altogether. Avelo's operations in Redding ended on August 26, 2024.

== Facilities ==
Redding Regional Airport covers 1,584 acres (641 ha) and has two asphalt runways: 16/34, 7,003 x 150 ft (2,135 x 46 m) and 12/30, 5,067 x 150 ft (1,544 x 46 m).

In 12 months through December 31, 2022, the airport had 60,902 aircraft operations, average 167 per day: 63% general aviation, 33% air taxi, 3% scheduled commercial and 1% military. At the airport were based 240 aircraft: 175 single-engine, 15 multi-engine, 19 helicopter and 31 jet.

=== Ground transportation ===
The airport is southeast of Redding along Airport Road at Knighton Road. Interstate 5 can be reached to the west via Knighton Road, and California State Route 44 can be reached to the north via Airport Road. Both long-term and short-term parking are available, as well as car rental and taxi services.

== Expansion plans ==
The City of Redding's remodel and expansion of the terminal building was complete as of November 11, 2014, when the grand opening took place. The project cost approximately $9.8 million, with the majority of funds coming from the FAA Airport Improvement Program. The terminal building was expanded from 20,000 sq. ft. to approximately 30,000 sq. ft. The secure passenger holding area increased its holding capacity from 70 passengers to over 200. The holding area now has restrooms, a convenience for passengers who previously had to leave the secure area if they needed to use the restroom. This project was constructed by the general contractor Danco Builders Northwest, out of Arcata.

== Airlines and destinations ==
Airlines	Destinations
Alaska Airlines	Seattle/Tacoma
United Express	Denver, Los Angeles, San Francisco

=== Cargo ===
Airlines	Destinations
FedEx Feeder	Sacramento

== Top Destinations ==
Busiest routes from RDD (August 2025 – July 2026)
Rank	City	Passengers	Airline
1	San Francisco, California	40,150	United
2	Denver, Colorado	20,400	United
3	Seattle, Washington	18,540	Alaska
4	Los Angeles, California	17,190	United

Top airlines at RDD (August 2025 – July 2026)
Rank	Airline	Passengers	Share
1	SkyWest Airlines	168,000	87.64%
2	Horizon Air	23,740	12.36%

Destinations map
Destinations from Redding Regional Airport
Red = Year-round destination
Green = Seasonal destination
Blue = Future destination

== Gallery ==
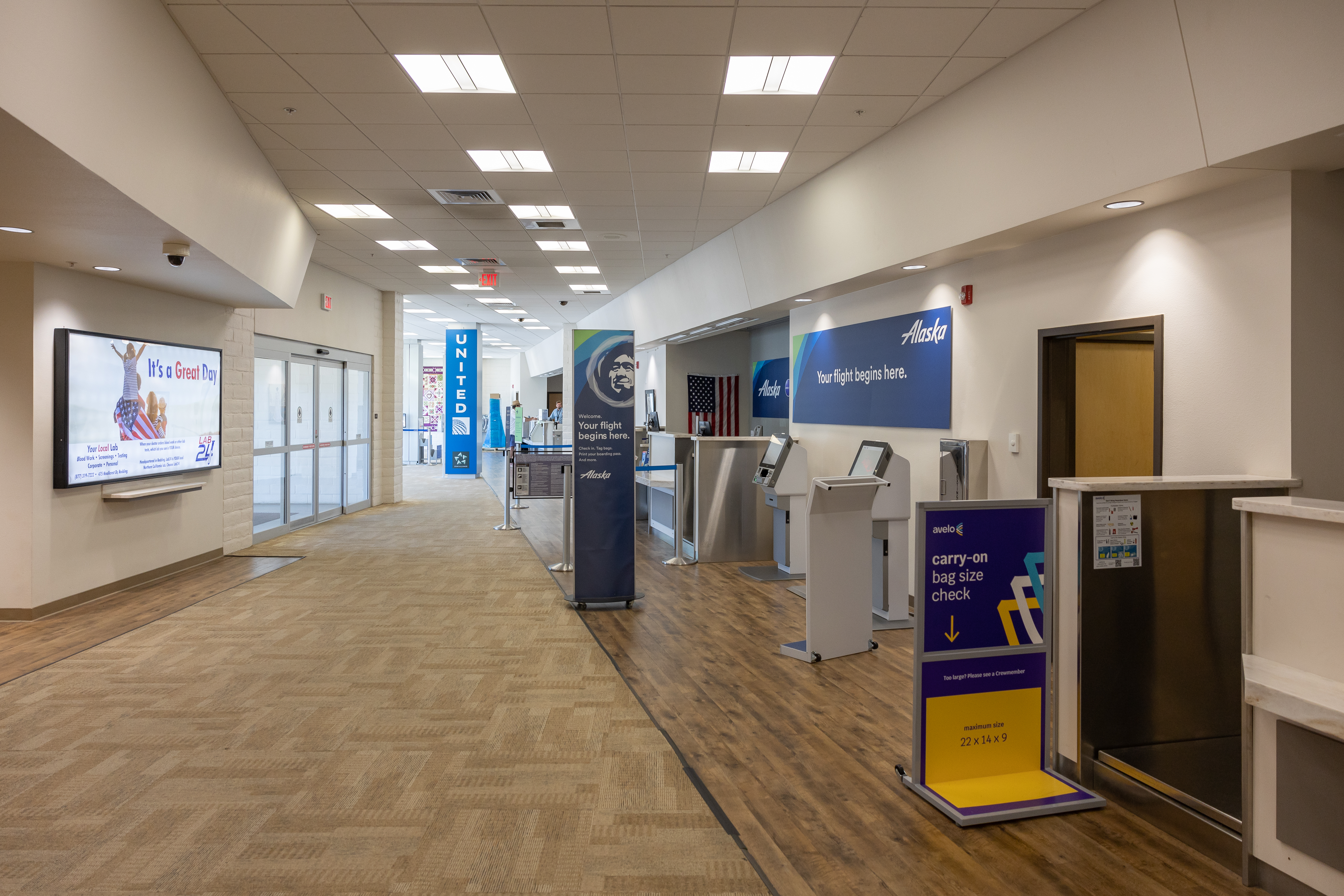
Ticketing area in the main terminal

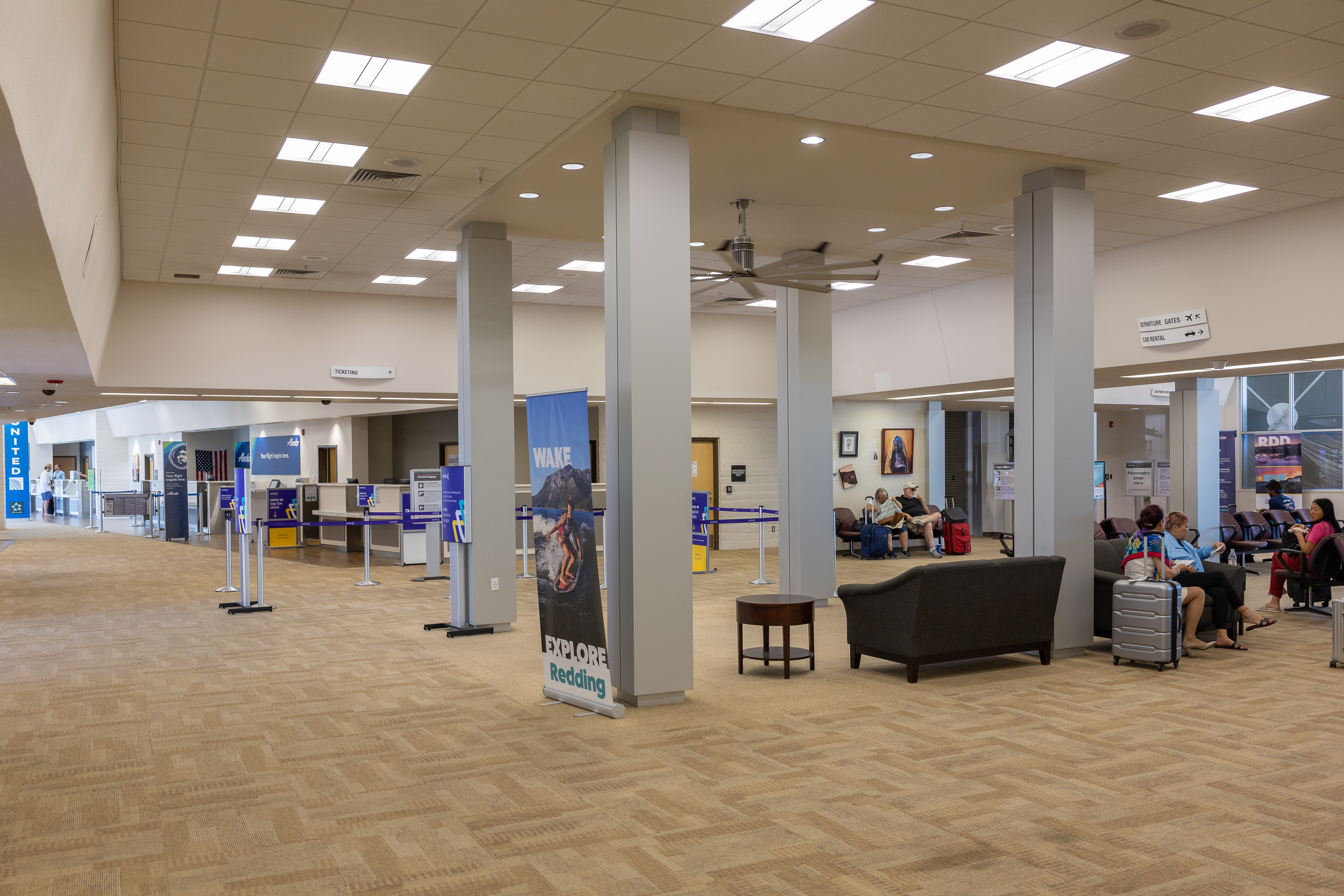
Waiting area of the airport

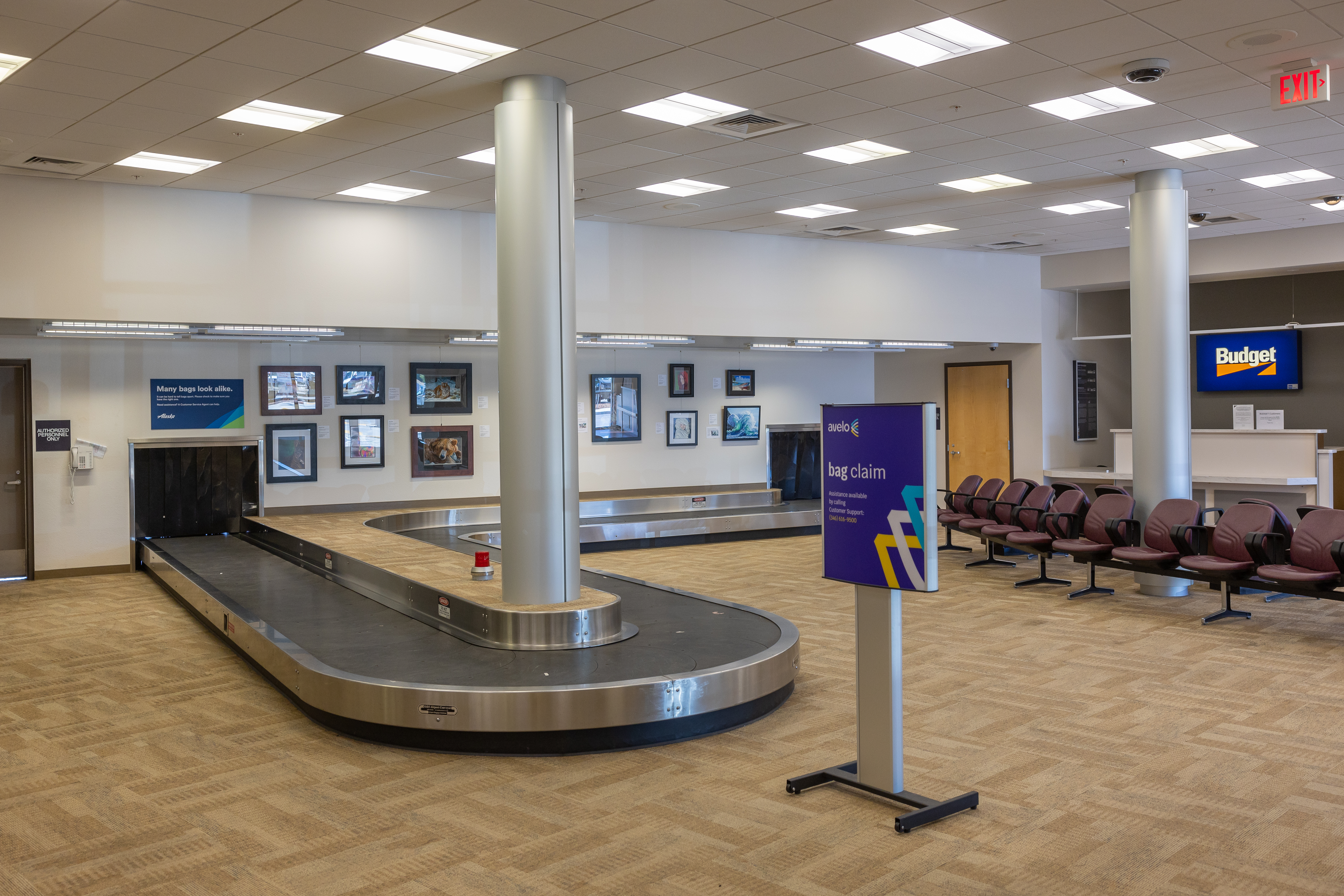
Baggage claim

== See also ==
- California World War II Army Airfields
- Benton Field
- California during World War II
- California World War II Army Airfields
- Air Transport Command (World War II)
- Chico Army Airfield auxiliary fields
