= Chico Army Airfield auxiliary fields =

US WWII airfields

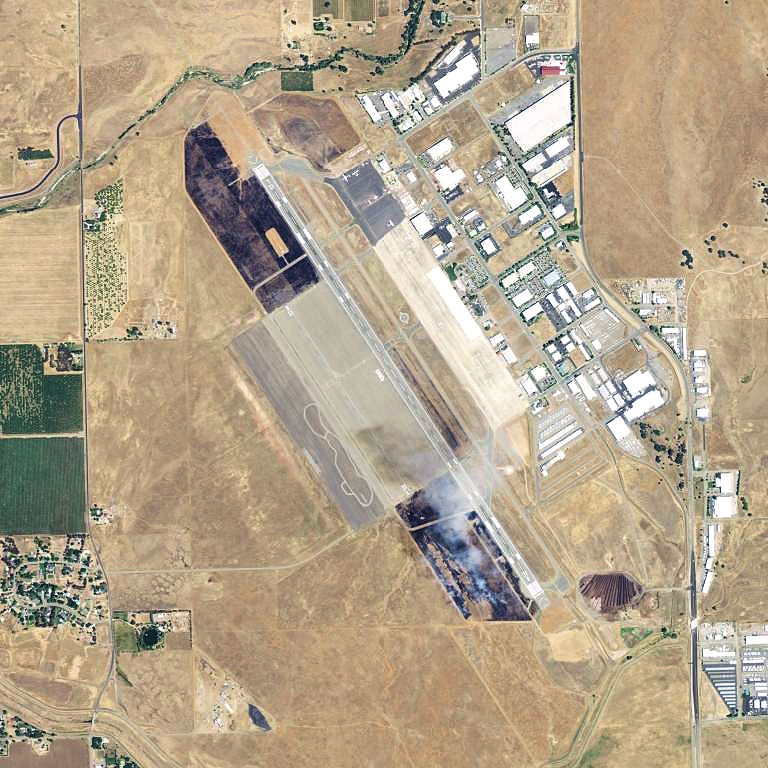
Chico Municipal Airport Chico Army Airfield, a 2006 USGS photo

Chico Army Airfield auxiliary fields were a number of airfields used during World War II to support the Chico Army Airfield. On September 11, 1941, the US Army rented from the City of Chico a small 1930's airport that sat on 160 acres (0.65 km^{2}) of land. The Airfield was five miles (8.0 km) north of the city center. The Army built up the small airport into the Chico Army Airfield. From the Chico Army Airfield operated the: United States Army Air Corps's Army Air Forces Basic Flying School, the Army Air Force Pilot School, the 10th Base Headquarters an Air Base Squadron and the 433rd Army Air Force Base Unit or Combat Crew Training Station of Fighter. To support the training of the many pilots, Chico Army Airfield operated a number of auxiliary airfields. Some auxiliary fields were no more than a landing strip runway, others were other operation airfield that supported the training at the Chico Army Airfield.

== Vina Auxiliary Field ==
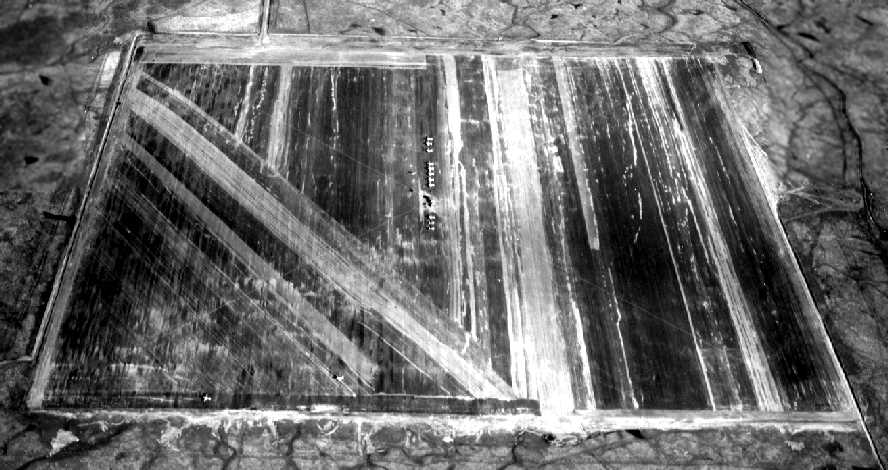
Vina Auxiliary Field in 1944

Vina Auxiliary Field also called Vina Auxiliary Field No. 3 was a 323.62 acres US Army airfield 3 miles northeast of Vina, California in Tehama County. Vina Auxiliary Field was 15 miles northwest of Chico at 39°56′54″N 121°59′29″W at an elevation of 280 feet. The Vina Auxiliary Field was used for training pilots from Flying School at Chico Army Air Field. The Army purchased the land in 1942 and opened the in 3,000-foot by 3,000-foot paved landing mat in 1943. The square mat was also used as an emergency landing field. A disabled plane could land coming from any direction. Most of students landed and took from the field using Vultee BT-13 and BT-15 trainers. After the war on November 20, 1946, the airfield was transferred to the War Assets Administration. The sold and then used as a civilian airport for he County of Tehama. Later the airport was closed and the land sold to a private owner, now called the Deer Creek Ranch Airport a private airport. The Deer Creek Ranch Airport is still a 3,000-foot by 3,000-foot paved landing mat as built in 1942.

== Willows Auxiliary Field ==
Willows Auxiliary Field is located one mile west of Willows, California in Glenn County at 39°30′55″N 122°13′50″W. A single runway on the site was built in 1931 on what was a grass pasture. The runway was built by the Civil Aeronautics Administration on a site already picked by local groups. The airport was operated by the City of Willows. On April 25, 1942, the US Army leased the airport with 318.20 acres of surrounding land and built a second runway on the site. The airport was used by the US Army for training pilots and troops. The two runways are: a 4,400-foot runway running north–south and a 4,400-foot runway running from west-northwest to east-southeast. The runways were used as an auxiliary airfield for Chico Army Air Field and the Hamilton Army Airfield. After the attack on Pearl Harbor the US and Jimmy Doolittle planned a bombing raid on Tokyo. In 1942 some of the B-25 crews started their final bombing training at Willows Auxiliary Field. The Willows Auxiliary Field closed on July 24, 1944, and the lease was terminated June 11, 1945. The Country opened the Willows-Glenn County Airport on the site. The Airport is located just west of the Interstate 5 at the California State Route 162 exit.

== Kirkwood Auxiliary Field ==
Kirkwood Auxiliary Field also called Kirkwood Auxiliary Army Airfield No. 2 was an airfield used to train pilots in the Army Air Forces Basic Flying School at Chico Army Air Field. The Kirkwood Auxiliary Field was located at 39°47′24″N 122°07′48″W, near Capay, California, northwest of Sacramento, California. Kirkwood Auxiliary Field was 7 miles northeast of the town of Orland, California and 18 miles west northwest of the city of Chico. The War Department purchased 359.62 acres of farmland on October 8, 1942, for the airfield. The Army built a 3,000-foot square asphalt landing mat and a few wood support buildings. The most common plane used at the airfield was the Vultee BT-13. After the war, on 19 June 1947, the airfield was transferred to the Glenn County. County of Glenn used the Airfield as civilian airport till 1970, after the closure the site was returned to farmland.

== Campbell Auxiliary Field ==
Campbell Auxiliary Field also called Campbel Auxiliary Field No. 4 was a US Army airfield built 12 miles northwest of Chico at 39°54′10″N 121°55′43″W. The Army purchased the 470 acres of livestock grazing pasture in 1942 and built a 3,000-foot x 3,000-foot landing mat there. Campbell Auxiliary Field was used for training pilots. The land was sold on July 12, 1946, and the airfield closed. Today the land is open and there is a light traces of former landing pad, just north of Zimmershed Creek and Pin Creek.

== Oroville Auxiliary Field ==
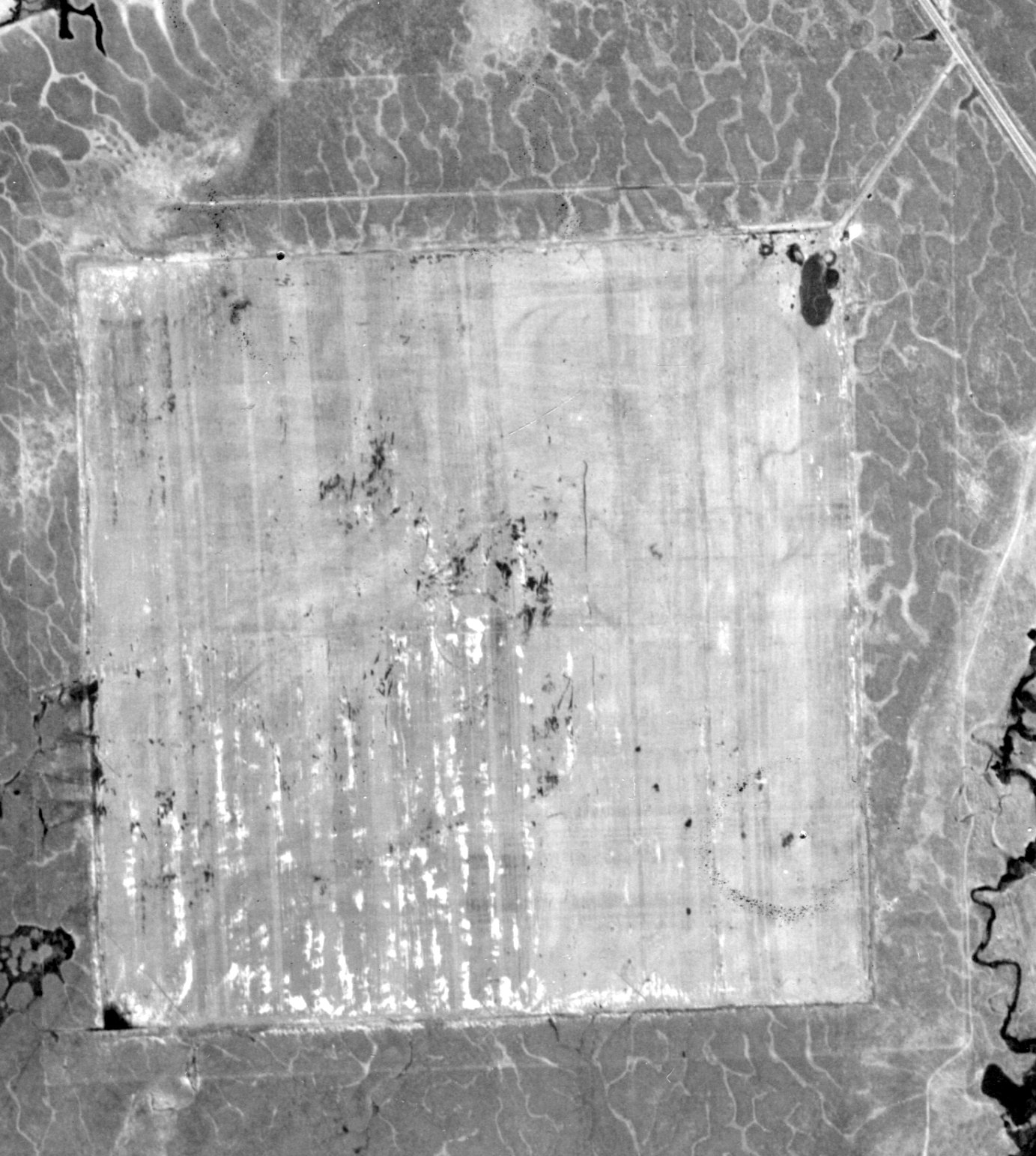
Abandon Oroville Auxiliary Field in USGS 1950 photo

Oroville Auxiliary Field also called Oroville Auxiliary Field No. 5 was a 360 acres Army airfield built in 1942 to train pilots. The 3,000-foot x 3,000-foot landing mat was located at 39°34′58″N 121°38′24″W. Unlike the other Chino auxiliary airfield, Oroville Auxiliary Field had a practice bombing range. The bombing range supported bombing, dive-bombing and skip bombing training ranges. Large white targets were built on the bombing range. The Oroville Auxiliary Field was closed on October 1, 1944, but opened again on June 18, 1945. On November 1, 1946, the airfield was closed and not reopened. Today the land is open and there is light traces of former landing pad, just south of the California State Route 149 at the Openshaw road exit-overpass in Wicks Corner, California.

== Orland Auxiliary Field ==
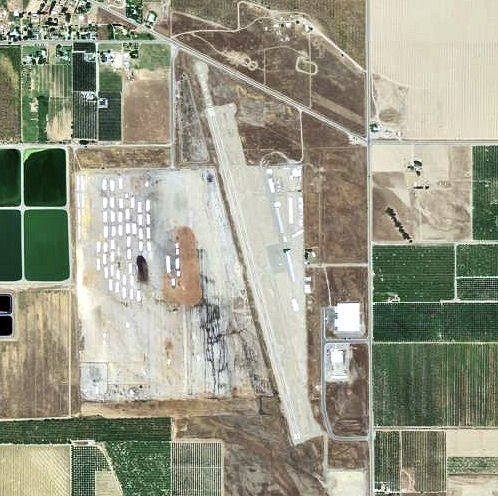
Current Haigh Field Airport, the outline of the 3,000' square Orland Auxiliary Field landing mat can clearly be seen

Orland Auxiliary Field is three miles (4.8 km) southeast of the city of Orland, California and 13 miles west of the city of Chico. The Army purchased the 558.20 acre of agricultural land called Crocker tract in 1942 for the Orland Auxiliary Field. The US Army built a 3,000 x 3,000-foot square landing mat on the site with a few support buildings. The Field was used to train fighter and bomber pilots from the Chico Army Airfield schools. The Orland Auxiliary Field was closed on November 30, 1946. Orland Auxiliary Field was transferred to Glenn County in May 1947, with conditions. Conditions were: used for public airport, Army improvements kept, changes not impact airport, Army could rent airport in state of emergency, land not sold without OK. Breach of conditions lose of land. The Orland-Haigh Airport opened in June 1947. A single 4,500 runway was built on the east side of the 3,000 by 3,000 Orland Auxiliary landing mat. The original outline of the Orland Auxiliary Field mat is visible from the air. The Airport is still open as the Haigh Field Airport, thus there has been no Breach. A sewage treatment plant was added to the land with other minor changes.

== Chico Army Airfield support ==
The following airfields were used in the support of training pilots at Chico Army Airfield school or were under the command of the Chico Army Airfield at one time. Hamilton Army Airfield also used or was in command of these airfields at some time:

- Siskiyou County Army Airfield

Siskiyou County Army Airfield is now the Siskiyou County Airport with a single north–south 7,484-foot runway. Built by the Civil Aeronautics Administration (CAA), but later turned over to the US Army. The army used the 7,484 runway for heavy bomber training. The 985.44-acre site was built in 1942 and is 4 miles northwest of Montague, California. For night landing a lighting system was installed by the Army. Later in October 1943 the base as turned over to be a sub base of Hamilton Field. On May 1, 1944, it was turned back over to be a Chino Auxiliary Field and used only as an emergency landing field. On December 30, 1944, the airfield declared inactive by the US Army. The Airfield was used on and off by fire fighters, US Forest Service and some small private planes. On 22 October 1962, the US Air Force rented the Airfield to station some Interceptor Squadrons from Hamilton Air Force Base and built some airfield improvements. The US Air Force ended its rental and removed jets on July 18, 1971, returning the Airfield to be a County Airport.

- Redding Army Airfield

Redding Army Airfield became the Redding Municipal Airport after the war. Redding Army Airfield was built in 1942 on 1,120 acres of acquired land near City of Redding. Two runways were built along with the needed support buildings. One runway ran north–south and was 6,000 feet long and 150 feet wide. The other runway ran northwest–southeast and was 5,062 feet long. Redding Army Airfield is located 160 miles north of Sacramento in Shasta County, California. The City wanted a new Airport and put in for a Works Progress Administration project that was called the Stillwater Airfield. But with the start of World War II the US Army renamed the project the Redding Airdrome. The building of Redding Airdrome started on January 12, 1942. At completion, in March 1942, the Airdrome was renamed Redding-Shasta Army Air Field. During operations the name was shorted to Redding Army Airfield. The Redding Army Airfield was used as a refueling stop and for training in the Bell P-39 Airacobra fighter aircraft. Bombs for the planes were stored at the Airfield. On November 16, 1947, the Redding Army Airfield was turn over to the City of Redding. The City took the 6,000-foot runway and make it 7,003 feet for jets.

- Sutterville Auxiliary Field

The original Sacramento civil airport was called the Sutterville Aerodrome that was six miles south of the City of Sacramento; it opened in 1930 on 235-acres. With the start of World War II, the Sutterville Aerodrome was taken over for use by the US Army and renamed the Sutterville Auxiliary Field. At first, the airfield was used as subbase of Hamilton Field. The Army leased land around the airfield and expanded operations at the airfield, renamed it the Sacramento Army Air Field. The Airfield was used by 4th Air Force and the Western Training Flying Command. Training was first on Ball P-39 Aircobras. On April 7, 1945, train switch to heavy bomber with the 404th and 405th Army Air Force. Sacramento Army Air Field became a sub-base to Chico Army Air Field. It was used jointly by the 4th Air Force and the Army Air Forces Western Flying Training Command. By 1945, the Army had three lighted runways in operation: a 6,000-foot runway running north/west by south/east, a 5,000-foot runway running north–south and a 5,000-foot runway running north/east by south/west. After the war, the Sacramento Army Air Field was returned to its owner, the City of Sacramento, and was renamed the Sacramento Municipal Airport. In October 1967, most airlines moved to the new Sacramento International Airport and the Sacramento Municipal Airport was renamed Sacramento Executive Airport.

== See also ==
- California during World War II
- California World War II Army Airfields
- Air Transport Command (World War II)
- Minter Army Airfield auxiliary fields
- Gardner Army Airfield auxiliary fields
