= Benton Airpark =

Benton Airpark may refer to:

- Benton Field, also known as Benton Airpark, in Redding, California, United States (FAA: O85)
- Lloyd Stearman Field, also known as Benton Airpark, in Benton, Kansas, United States (FAA: 1K1)

== See also ==
- Benton Airport (disambiguation)
