= Benton Airport =

Benton Airport may refer to:

- Benton Municipal Airport in Benton, Illinois, United States (FAA: H96)
- Benton Airpark (disambiguation):
  - Benton Field (Benton Airpark) in Redding, California, United States (FAA: O85)
  - Lloyd Stearman Field (Benton Airpark) in Benton, Kansas, United States (FAA: 1K1)
