= Siskiyou County Airport =

Siskiyou County Airport Siskiyou County Air Force Auxiliary Airfield
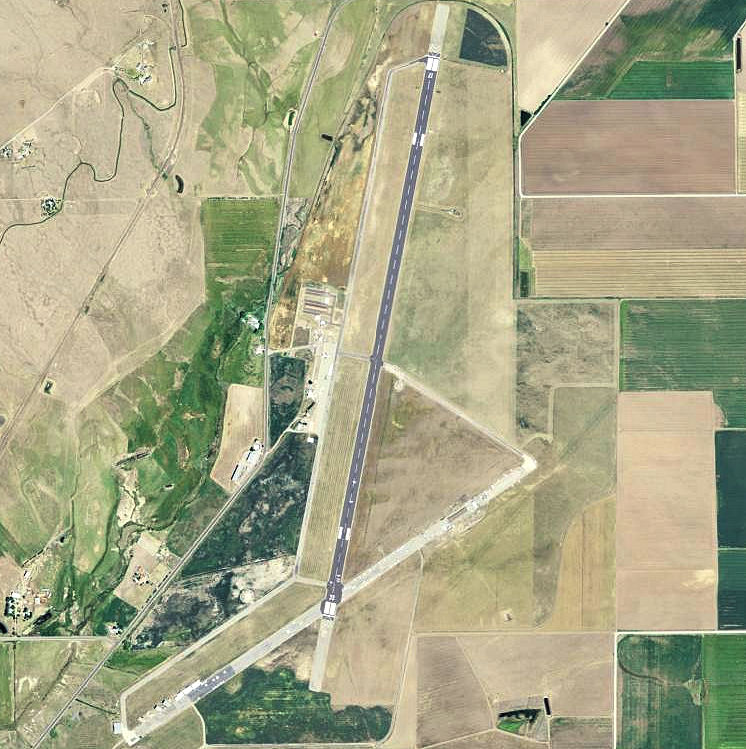
- 2006 USGS photo
- IATA: SIY; ICAO: KSIY

Summary
- Airport type: Public
- Operator: Siskiyou County
- Location: Montague, California
- Elevation AMSL: 2,648 ft / 807 m
- Coordinates: 41°46′53.190″N 122°28′05.19″W

Map
- Location of Siskiyou County Airport

Runways
Direction	Length		Surface
Direction	ft	m	Surface
17/35	7,484	2,281	Asphalt

Siskiyou County Airport (IATA: SIY, ICAO: KSIY) is a public airport located three miles (4.8 km) northeast of Montague, serving Siskiyou County, California, United States. It has one runway and is mostly used for general aviation.

== History ==
The Army Air Forces and the U.S. Air Force used the Siskiyou County Airport over two separate periods, from 1942 to 1945 and from 1962 to 1972. The site first served as an auxiliary field and later as a dispersal base.

=== World War II ===
The United States Army Air Forces first leased the Siskiyou County Airport on 18 November 1942. The airport was constructed with funds from the Civil Aeronautics Administration (CAA). The Army upgraded and extended the original 6,500 foot runways to 7,300 feet to handle bombardment aircraft. The Army also added taxiways, a night lighting system, a power control building and enclosed the field with a barbed wire fence. By fall of 1943, the airfield was a sub-base of Hamilton Field. With administration provided by Hamilton Field and without housing facilities, Siskiyou County Airport did not become a key installation.

On 1 May 1944, the Army Air Forces reassigned the airfield to the Chico Army Airfield (AAF). It remained an unmanned auxiliary field and primarily functioned as an emergency landing field for disabled aircraft or "itinerant army planes". Use of the airport in 1944 seems modest, as inspections found mud from cattle on the field at various times.

On 15 October that year, Chico AAF transferred jurisdiction of the Siskiyou County Airport to the Air Technical Service Command (ATSC). On 3 November 1944, the Interdepartmental Air Traffic Control Board approved use of the field by Siskiyou County as an alternate airport for commercial scheduled air carrier operations. On 30 December 1944, the ATSC declared the Army Air Forces no longer needed the airport and recommended it for disposal. On 23 January 1945, the ATSC placed the airport on inactive status and subleased portions of the site for agricultural purposes.

Following the initial military use, commercial operations of the airport continued. These included firefighting operations by the U.S. Forest Service and flying small private aircraft.

=== United States Air Force use ===
On 13 September 1962 representatives from the United States Air Force Air Defense Command met with the Siskiyou County, Board of Supervisors. The Siskiyou County Airport seemed "ideally suited for use as a dispersal site because it was well outside of any targeted or fallout area." The Air Force subsequently leased and acquired joint use of the runways and exclusive use of other portions of the airport on 22 October 1962. A few weeks later, aircraft from the 83d and 84th Fighter-Interceptor Squadrons from Hamilton Air Force Base (AFB) moved in as part of the Cuban Missile Crisis dispersal operation. No regular training missions were scheduled for the airport during this period.

By 15 January 1964, these squadrons were replaced by the 82d Fighter-Interceptor Squadron from Travis AFB. In December of that year the Air Force began improvements to the site including runway maintenance and the construction of a mobile control tower, along with support facilities for radar. Other facilities included a runway overrun, operations apron, approach lighting, four aircraft shelters, a maintenance dock, utilities, an ammunition storage magazine and roadways. These facilities were considered complete on 17 December 1965. The Aircraft Dispersal Program at Siskiyou County Airport was transferred to the ADC 28th Air Division, Hamilton AFB on 1 October 1965.

The Air Force ended their dispersal program at Siskiyou County Airport by 19 July 1971 as part of the phase-down of the ADC interceptor forces, reporting the land as excess to the General Services Administration (GSA). The Air Force terminated the lease with the county on 15 May 1972, coinciding with GSA conveying the remaining parcels and easements to the county.

== Facilities ==
Siskiyou County Airport has one runway:

- Runway 17/35: 7,484 ft × 150 ft (2,281 m × 46 m), surface: asphalt

== See also ==
- Montague Airport (RKC/1O5) - also located in Montague
- Chico Army Airfield auxiliary fields
