= Sacramento Executive Airport =

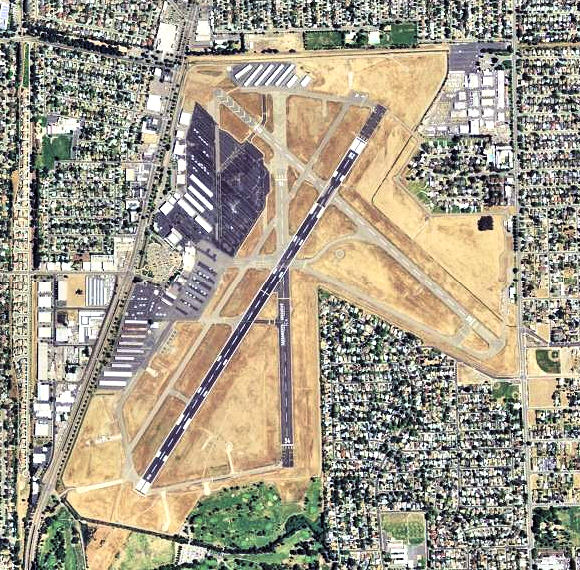
- 2006 USGS photo
- IATA: SAC; ICAO: KSAC; FAA LID: SAC; WMO: 72483

Summary
- Airport type: Public
- Operator: Sacramento County
- Location: Sacramento, California
- Elevation AMSL: 24 ft / 7 m
- Coordinates: 38°30′45″N 121°29′36″W

Map

Runways
Direction	Length		Surface
Direction	ft	m	Surface
2/20	5,503	1,677	Asphalt
12/30	3,837	1,170	Asphalt

Helipads
Number	Length		Surface
Number	ft	m	Surface
H1	60	18	Asphalt

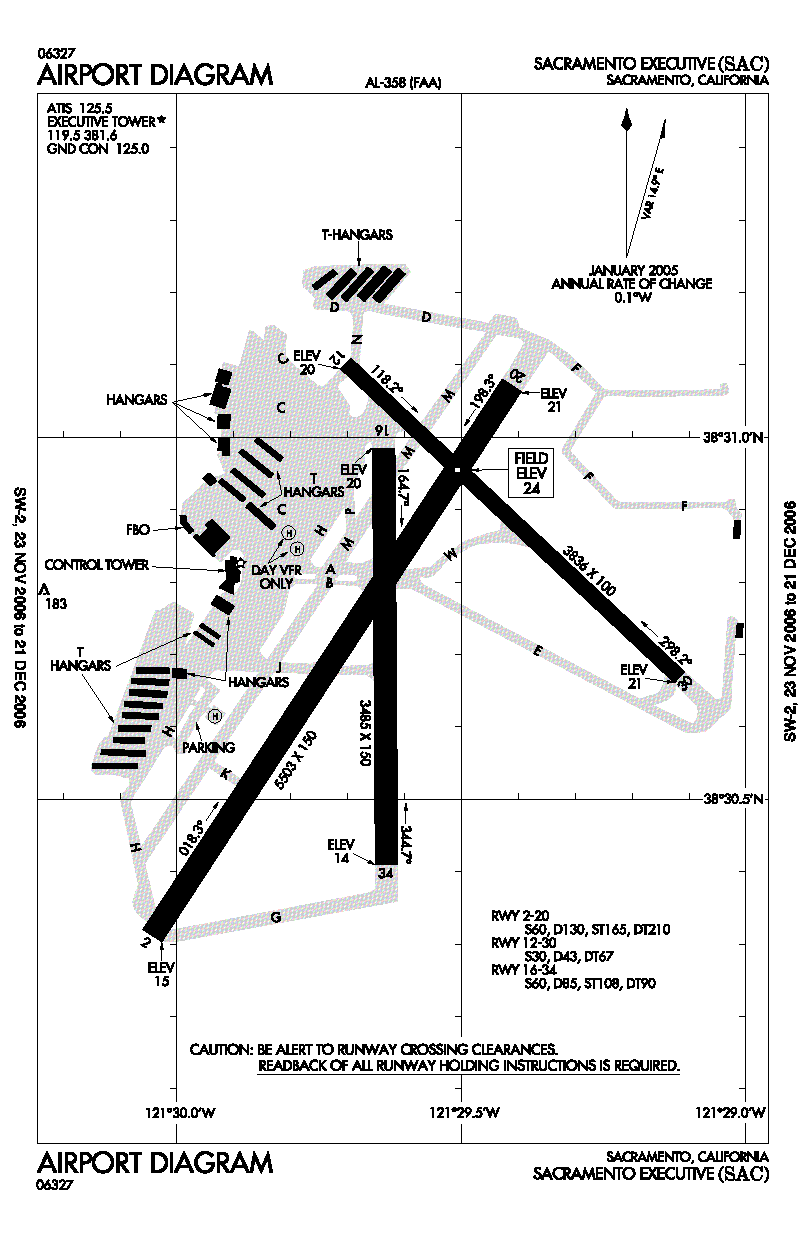
FAA diagram

Sacramento Executive Airport (IATA: SAC, ICAO: KSAC, FAA LID: SAC) is a public airport three miles (5 km) south of downtown Sacramento, in Sacramento County, California, United States. The airport covers 540 acres (219 ha) and has two lighted runways and a helipad.

== History ==
When it opened in 1930 Executive Airport was known as Sutterville Aerodrome. As the city-owned facility expanded, in 1941 construction was under way to pave and extend the airport's three runways.

The U.S. Army Air Corps took over the airport during World War II; after the war, control returned to the city and the facility was renamed Sutterville Auxiliary Field. The airfield was used by 4th Air Force and the Army Air Forces Western Flying Training Command. Training was first on Bell P-39 Airacobra, as Chico Army Airfield auxiliary field. On April 7, 1945, training switched to heavy bomber with the 404th and 405th Army Air Force. The US made many improvements to the airfield. After the war the Sacramento Army Air Field returned to its owner, the City of Sacramento, and was renamed Sacramento Municipal Airport.

In the late 1940s and early 1950s more improvements were made to parking and taxiway paving, water and sewer systems, and runway/taxiway lighting. The terminal building was built in 1955 along with some navigational aids and T-hangars. In October 1967 most airlines moved to the new Sacramento International Airport and the Sacramento Municipal Airport was renamed Sacramento Executive Airport.

United Airlines Douglas DC-3s began flying nonstop to Los Angeles in 1946, but nonstops from SAC never reached north beyond Medford, OR or east beyond Nevada. Jet service flown by United with Boeing 727-100s and Western Airlines Boeing 720Bs appeared in 1964.

In the airport's last summer of airline operations, the August 1967 Official Airline Guide (OAG) lists 22 weekday nonstops to San Francisco (SFO), eleven nonstops to Los Angeles, seven nonstops to Reno, two flights to Medford, two flights to Marysville, and one flight each to Lake Tahoe, Klamath Falls and Oakland. Pacific Air Lines flights to the north continued to Chico, Eureka/Arcata, Crescent City and Portland. Pacific Air Lines flight 771 operated with a Fairchild F-27 flew a multistop "milk run" schedule: Reno-Lake Tahoe-Sacramento-San Francisco-San Jose-Fresno-Bakersfield-Burbank-Los Angeles-San Diego. United Airlines flight 224 operated with a Boeing 727-100 flew San Francisco-Sacramento-Reno-Denver-Chicago-New York La Guardia Airport. Aircraft included Martin 4-0-4s and Fairchild F-27s operated by Pacific Air Lines), Lockheed L-188 Electras operated by Pacific Southwest Airlines (PSA) as well as Boeing 727-100s operated by PSA and United Airlines, and Boeing 720Bs operated by Western with one B720B nonstop a day to LAX.

In October 1967 the airlines moved to the new Sacramento Metropolitan Airport (SMF) and Sacramento Municipal Airport was renamed Sacramento Executive Airport. The County of Sacramento became the operator of both airports.

According to the OAG, Sierra Mountain Airways, a small commuter air carrier, was operating scheduled passenger service into the airport in late 1988 with Dornier 228 turboprop aircraft with flights from Fresno, Oakland, Reno and other destinations.

Executive Airport is self-supporting, receiving no city, county, or tax money. All operating expenses are paid by users.

=== 1972 Farrell's Ice Cream Parlour Crash ===
On September 24, 1972, a former military Canadair Sabre Mk. 5 jet in civil ownership with US registration N275X was returning to Oakland from the Golden West Sport Aviation Show. Due to pilot error, the airplane failed to become airborne, went off the end of the runway, across a road and crashed into Farrell's Ice Cream Parlour. The explosion killed 22, twelve of those children, and injured 28 more people. The tragedy prompted stricter regulations at the airport, and the opening of the Sacramento Firefighter's Burn Institute. The Crossroads shopping center that housed the ice cream parlour was closed and rebuilt in 2002 as the Sacramento Public Safety Center, which is the main center for the Sacramento Fire Department and Sacramento Police Department.

A memorial was built at the crash site and dedicated in March 2003.

=== 1987 Crash ===
On January 13, 1987, a single-engine airplane crashed shortly after taking off from Sacramento Executive Airport in gusty winds, killing four people.

== Facilities ==
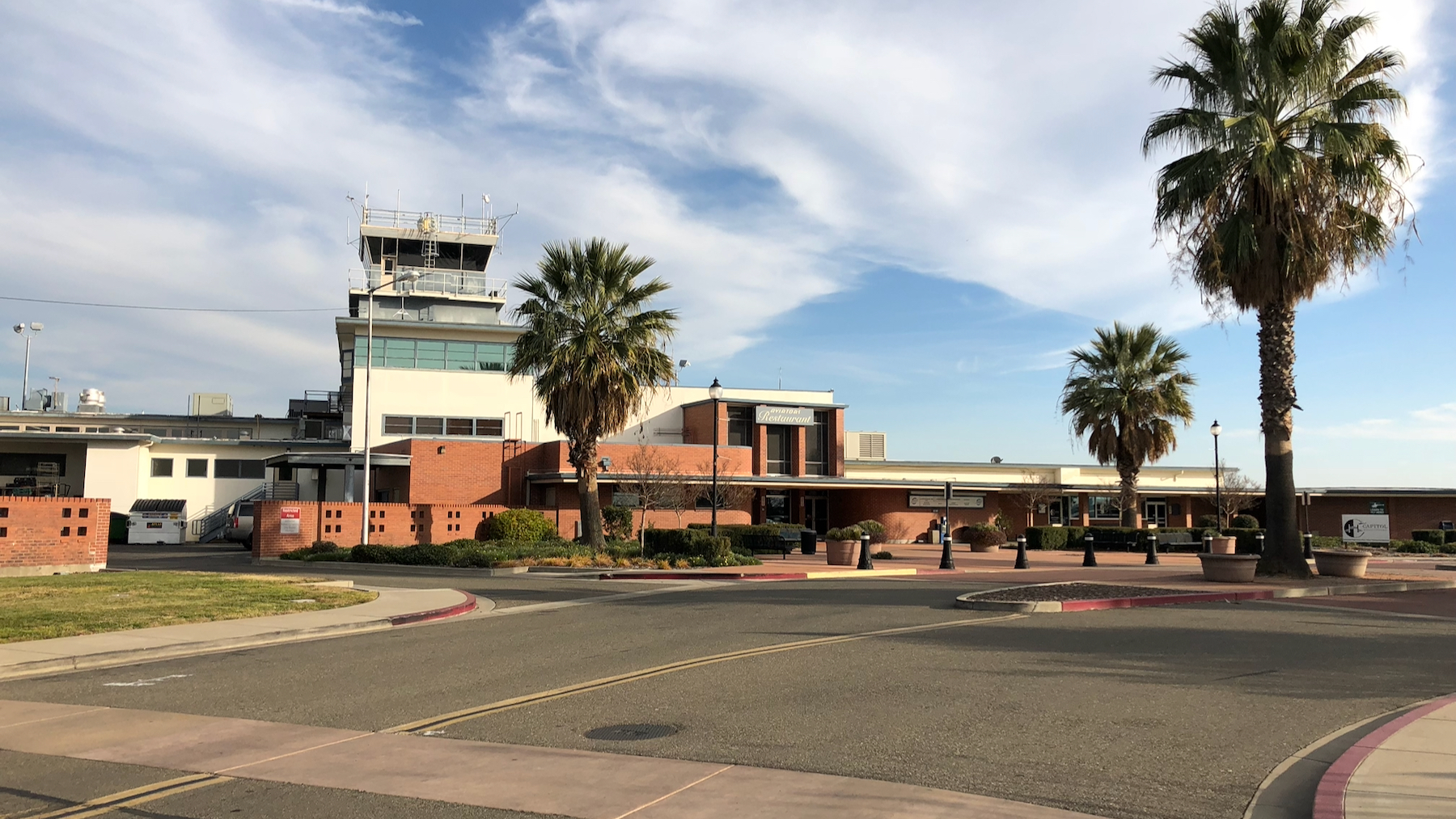
Front of Sacramento Executive Airport from Freeport Blvd., 2017

In addition to an ATC tower, the airport has two paved, lighted runways and has tie-downs and hangar rentals. In 2004, aircraft operations averaged 370 per day.

Over 20 businesses are located at Executive: air charters; aircraft sales, rentals and repairs; flight training; pilot supplies; computer-based testing; and car rentals.

10 minutes from downtown Sacramento, Executive is close to tourist attractions such as Old Sacramento, the State Capitol, Cal Expo State Fairgrounds, and Golden 1 Center (new arena of the Sacramento Kings). The airport is near three public golf courses and major shopping areas.

Executive has two lighted runways: Runway 2/20 is 5,503 ft x 150 ft. (It was 6000 feet when the airlines were there.) Runway 2 has a Medium Intensity Approach Light System with Runway Alignment Indicator Lights (MALSR), while REIL and PAPI are on Runway 20 and Runway 12/30. Runway 16/34 was closed in September 2017 and marked permanently closed as of February 13, 2019. The FAA contract control tower operates 06:00–21:00 (local).

Fuel is available from trucks or 24-hour self-serve credit card pumps, and plenty of tie-down and transient parking is available, the first six hours being free. Automobile parking in front of the terminal is plentiful, and free for the first 72 hours.

Amenities include:

- Pilot's lounge
- SACjet terminal with available meeting rooms
- Executive Airport terminal with available meeting rooms
- Disabled access, accommodations, and services throughout the facilities
- Restaurant in the terminal building
- Self-serve 100 LL Avgas, Jet A, tie-downs, hangar space, FBO and line services
- Contract control tower 6 a.m. to 9 p.m. daily (Serco)
- Free, short-term (72-hour) auto parking

Restaurants
Serving breakfast, lunch, and dinner, Aviators overlooks the airfield and can hold up to 190 people. It is available for banquet use and other events.

== Cargo carriers ==
Airlines	Destinations
Ameriflight	Oakland, Portland, Reno

== See also ==
- California World War II Army Airfields
- Chico Army Airfield auxiliary fields
