= Chico Air Museum =

Coordinates: 39.803415°N 121.858291°W

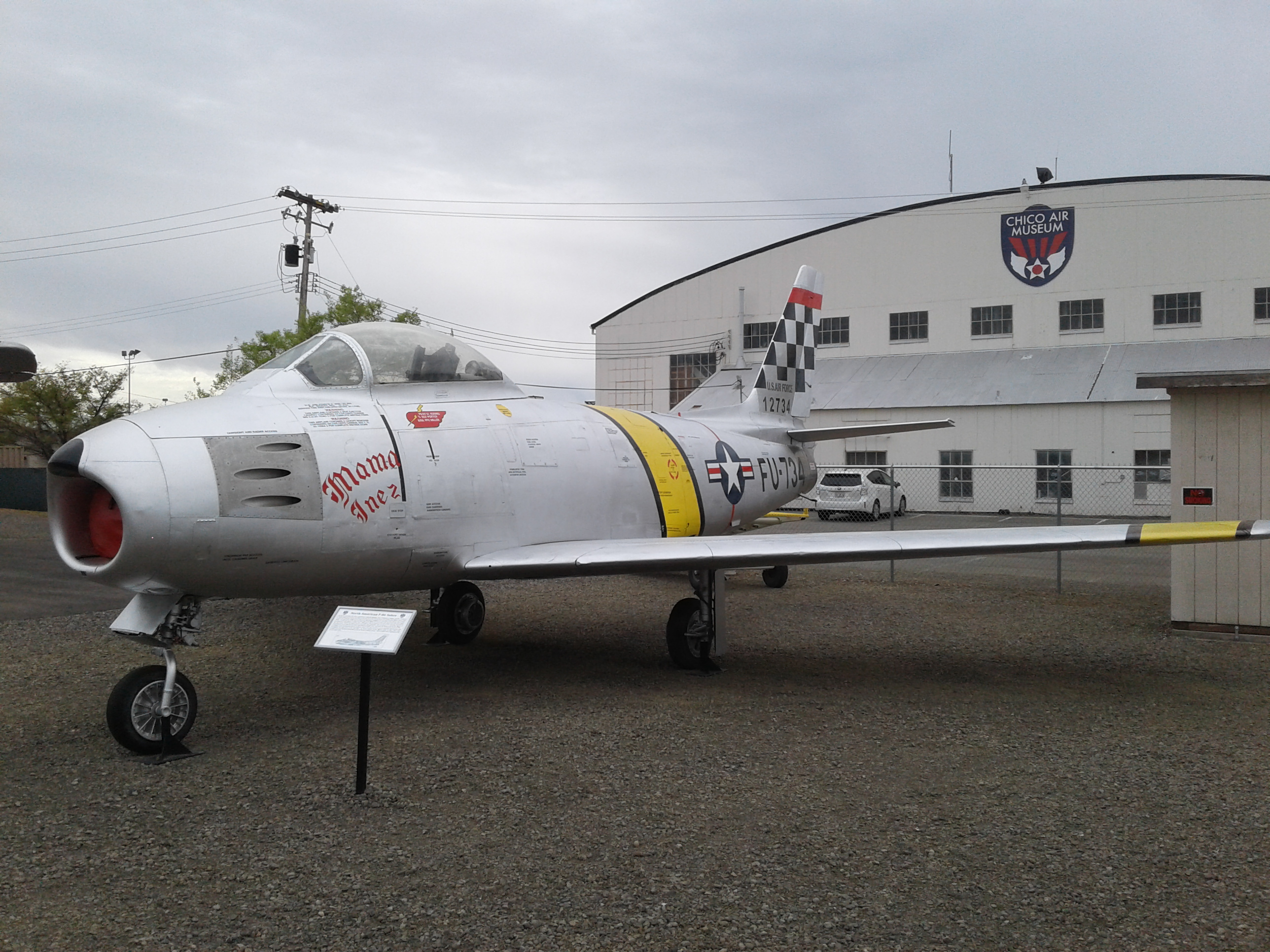
F-86 Sabre "Mama Inez" in front of the Chico Air Museum

The Chico Air Museum is a nonprofit aviation museum located at the Chico Municipal Airport in Chico, California. Its mission statement is to "collect, preserve, document and display aircraft, and aviation and space artifacts. The museum’s primary purpose is to educate and inspire people of all ages about aviation and the history of flight".

== History ==
A BT-13 left the museum in late 2024.

== Exhibits ==
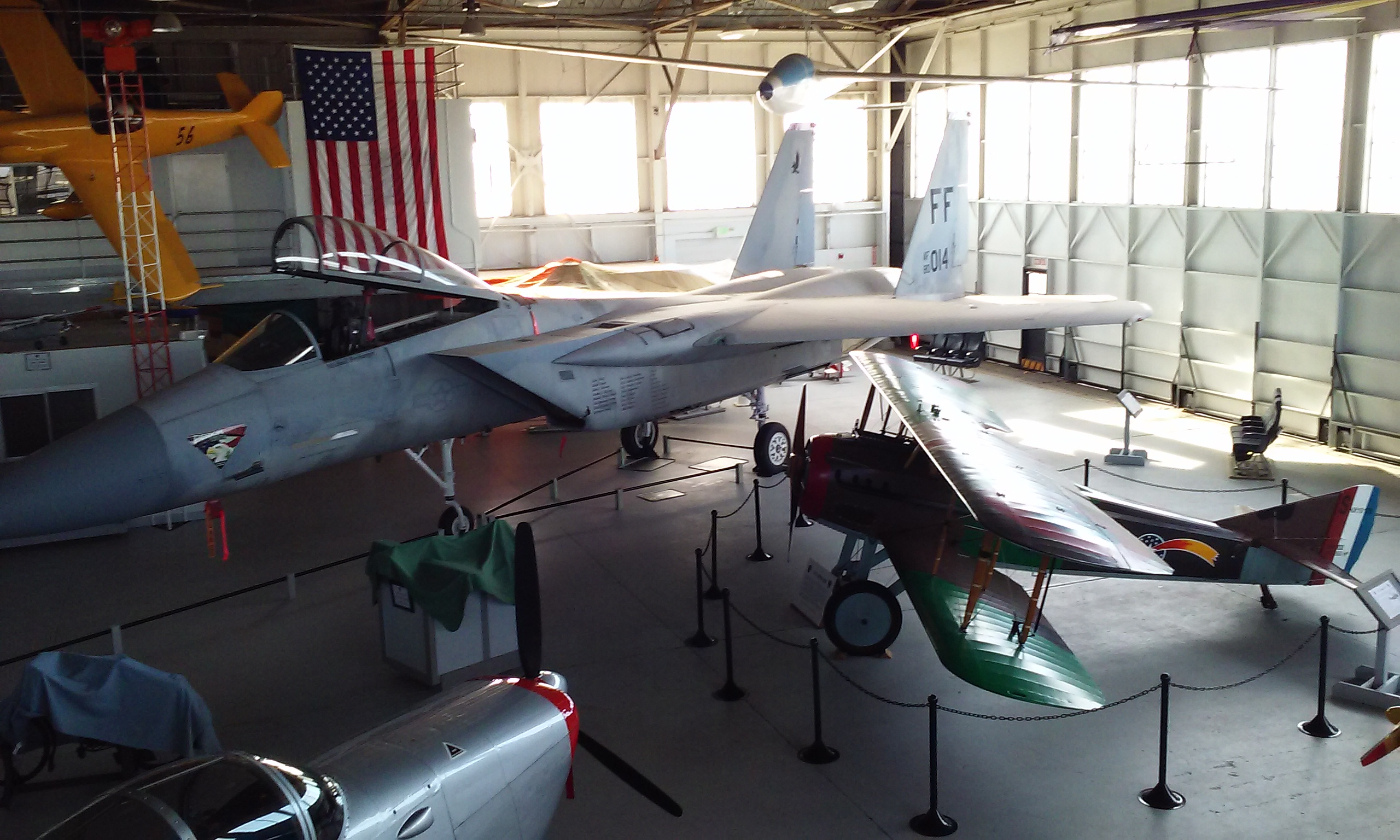
F-15 Eagle and SPAD S.XIII at the Chico Air Museum

The museum has a number of aircraft, artifacts and exhibits on display in a WW II era hangar that was originally part of the Chico Army Airfield (and once owned and operated by Aero Union). There is also an outside static display area, a large collection of scale models, and an extensive aviation research library. The museum's hangar is located next to the Chico Air Attack Base (CAAB). During fire season, visitors can watch air operations of multiple types of air tankers that use this base to re-load and re-fuel.

== Airman Docent Program ==
In 2016, the museum launched the Airman Docent Program, which allows children under the age of 18 to volunteer as museum docents

== Improvements ==
In addition to aircraft restoration, the museum is currently working on a space exhibit and is planning to improve the entrance to the hangar, including a "walk of honor".

== Aircraft on display ==
Below is a partial list of aircraft the museum has on display, as of September 2018.

- McDonnell Douglas F-15 Eagle
- North American F-86 Sabre
- LTV A-7 Corsair II
- Vultee BT-13 Valiant
- SPAD S.XIII
- Grumman AF-2S Guardian
- Aero L-29 Delfin
- Lockheed T-33 Shooting Star
- Lockheed P-2 Neptune
- Piasecki H-21 Workhorse
- Bell 47
- Antonov AN-2
- Thorp T-211
- Taylor Titch
- Pitts Model 12
- Schreder Airmate HP-11
- Rotary Air Force RAF 2000
- Link Trainer

== Photo gallery ==
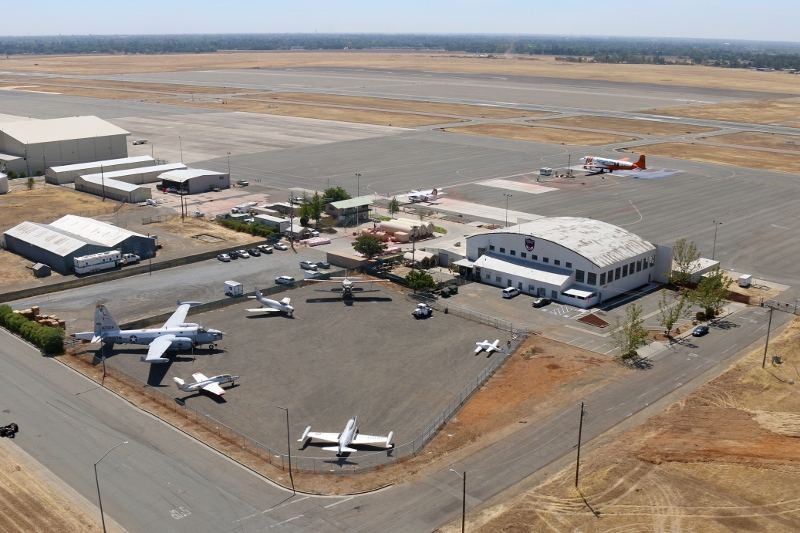
Aerial view of the Chico Air Museum

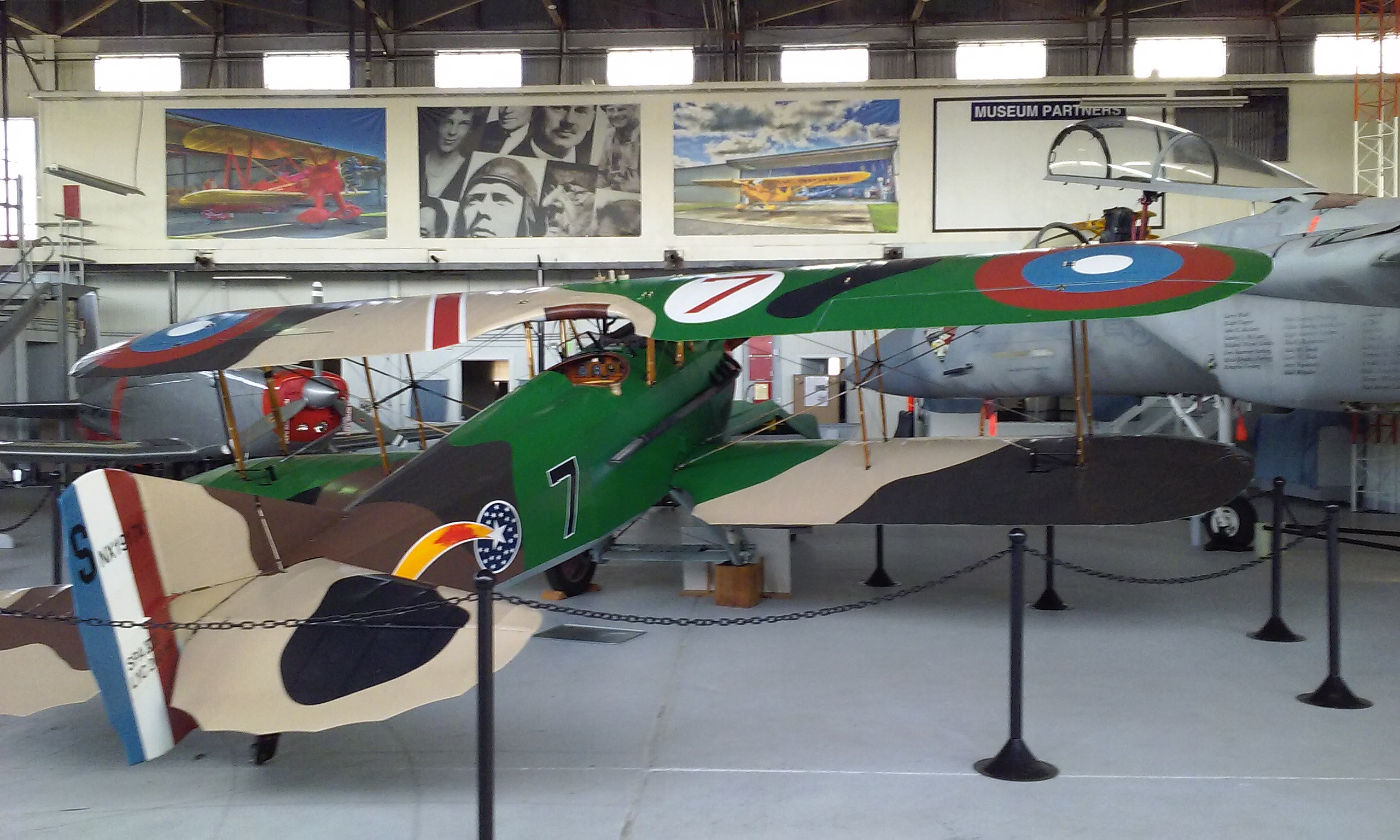
Interior view of the Chico Air Museum

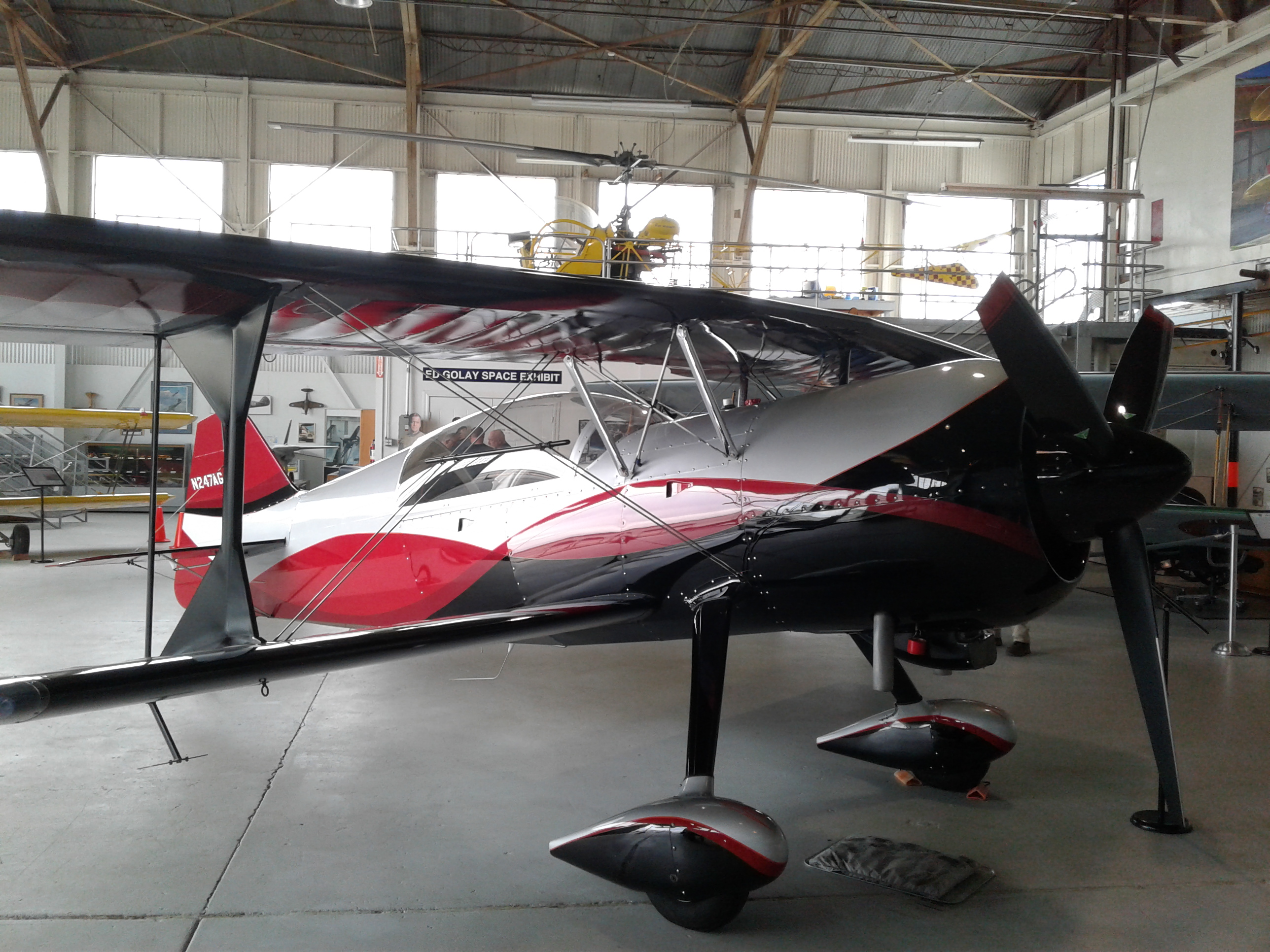
Pitts 12 on display

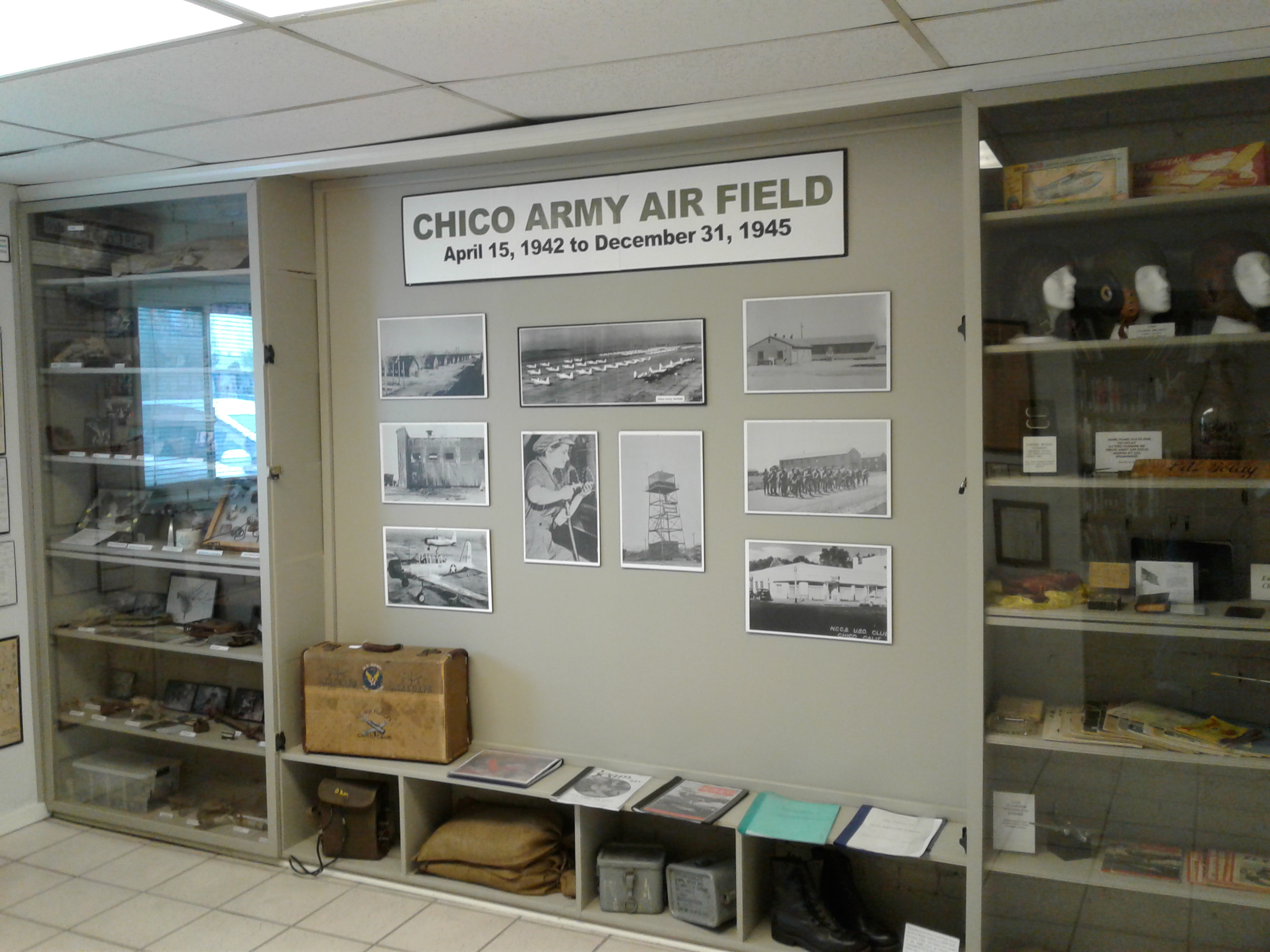
Exhibit on the history of the Chico Army Air Field

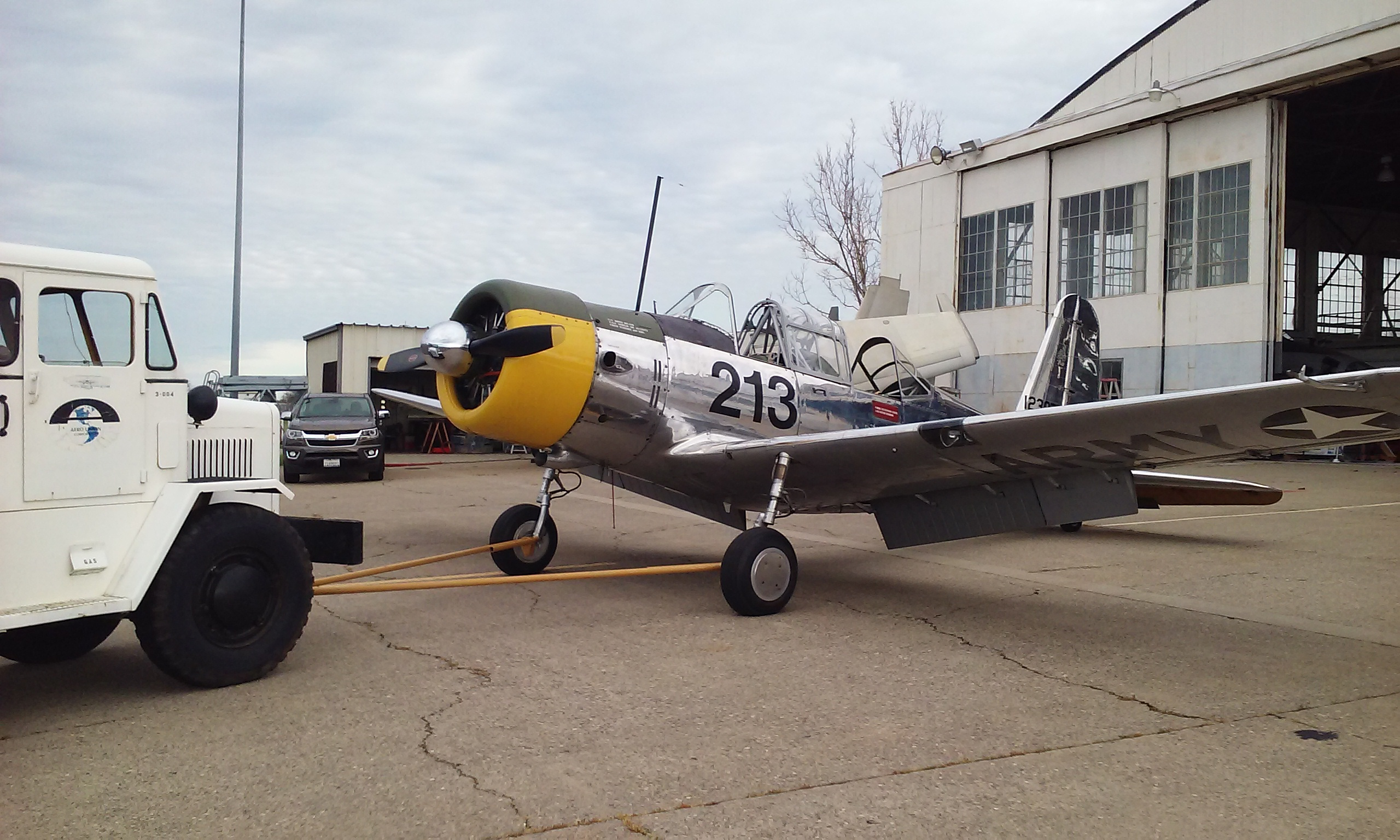
A BT-13 Valiant being towed from the Chico Air Museum hangar. This is the museum's only flight-worthy aircraft and is on loan to the museum.

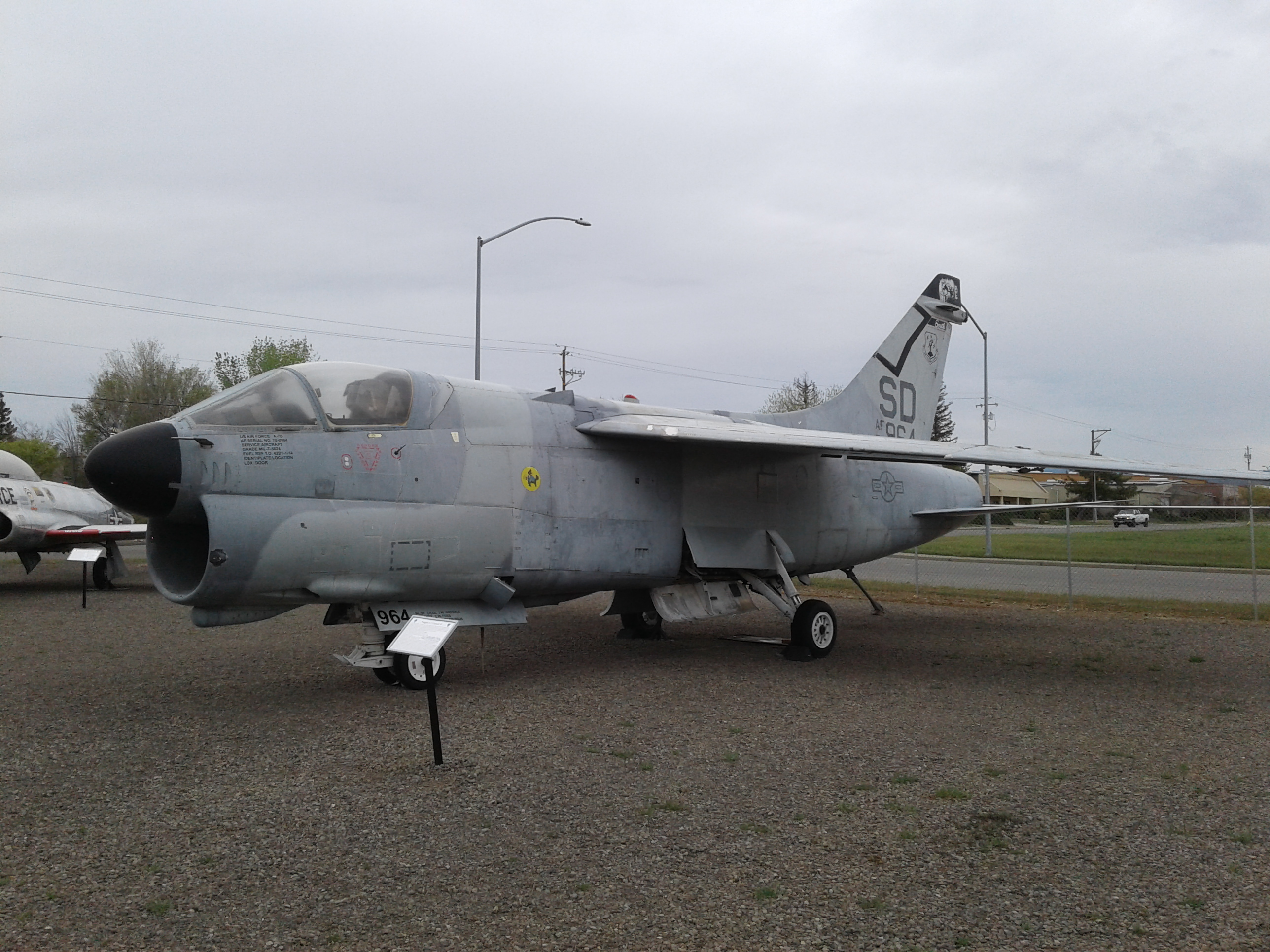
A-7D Corsair II in the outside display area

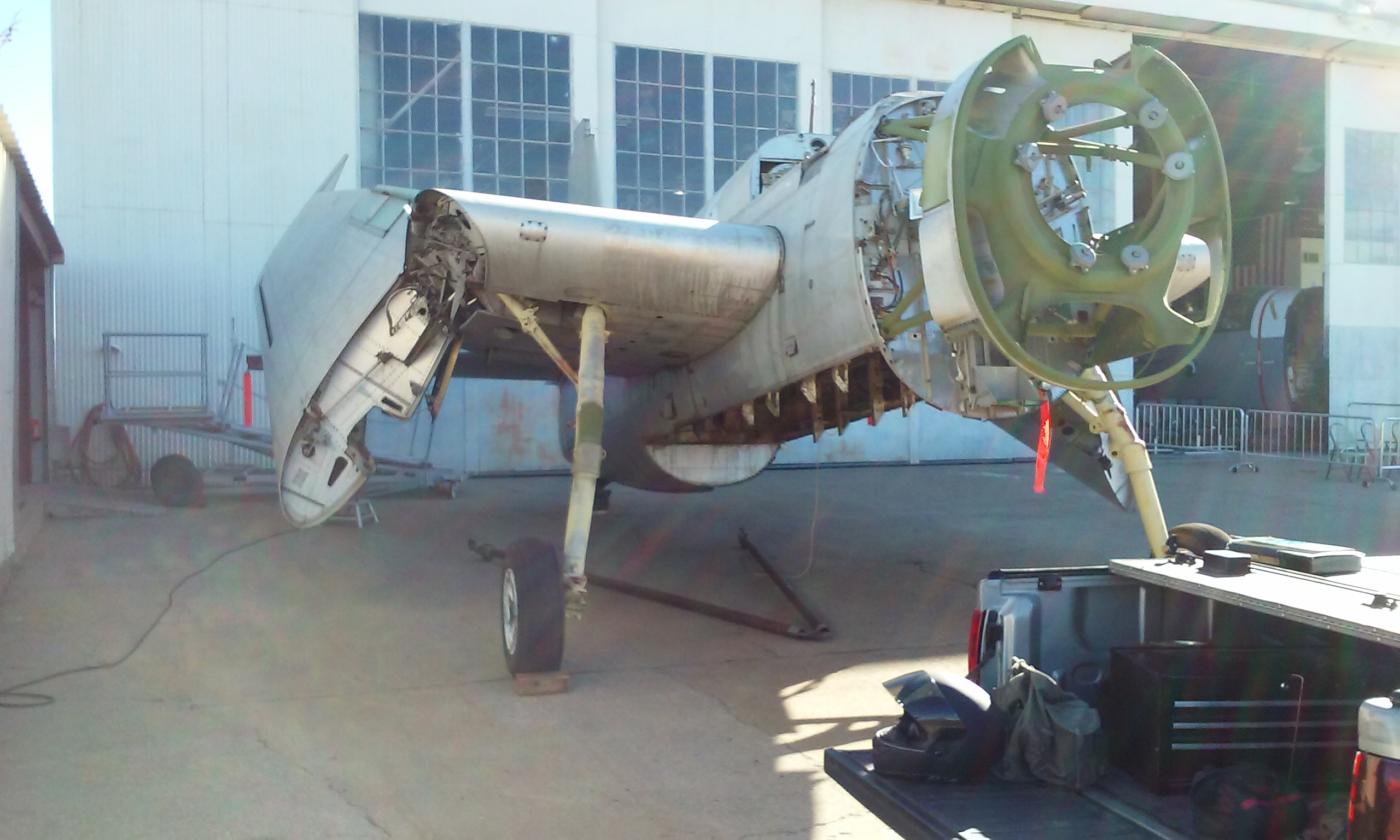
AF-2S Guardian (serial no. 2) awaiting restoration.

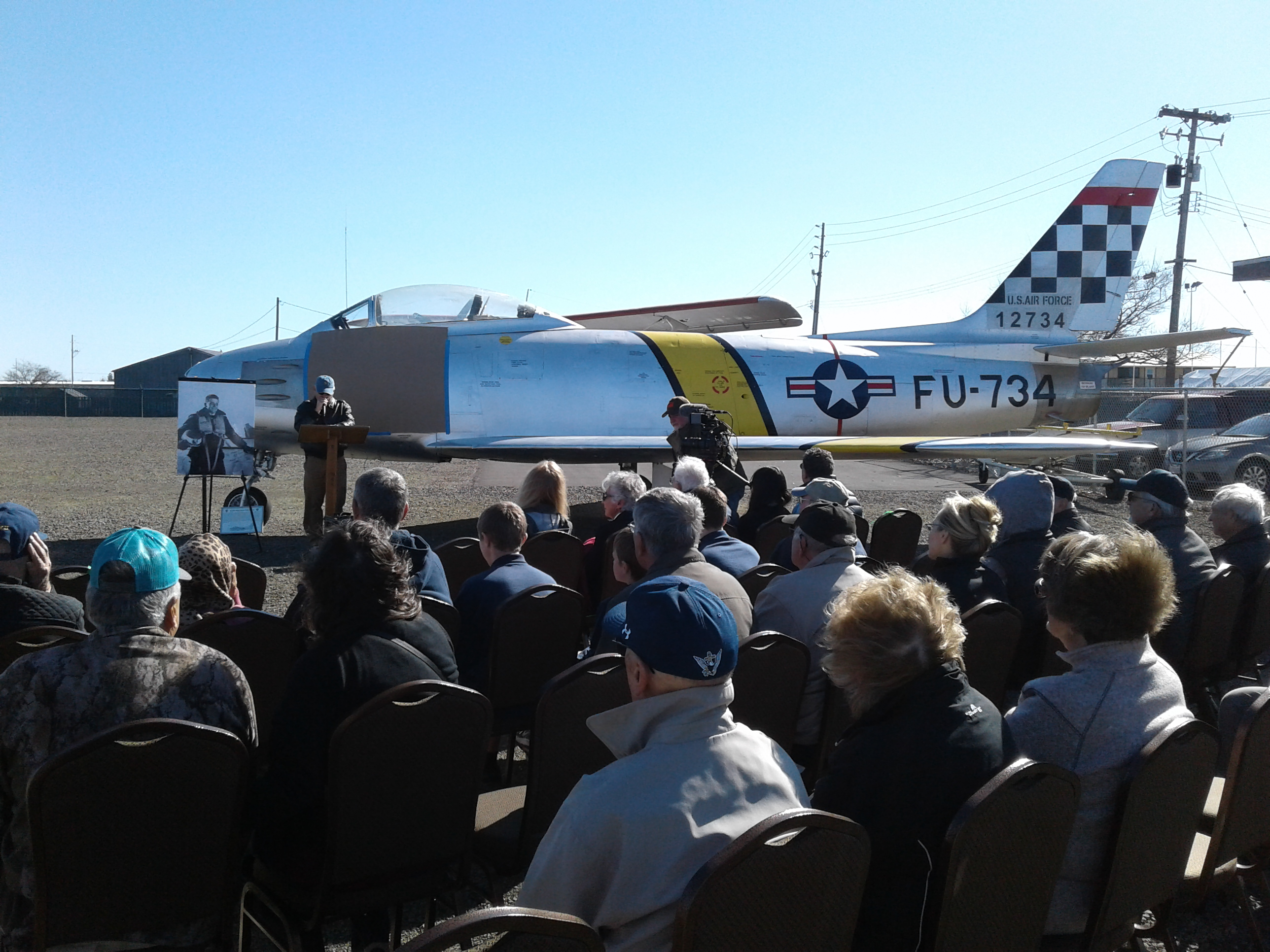
Dedication ceremony of the F-86 Sabre "Mama Inez" to Korean War veterans

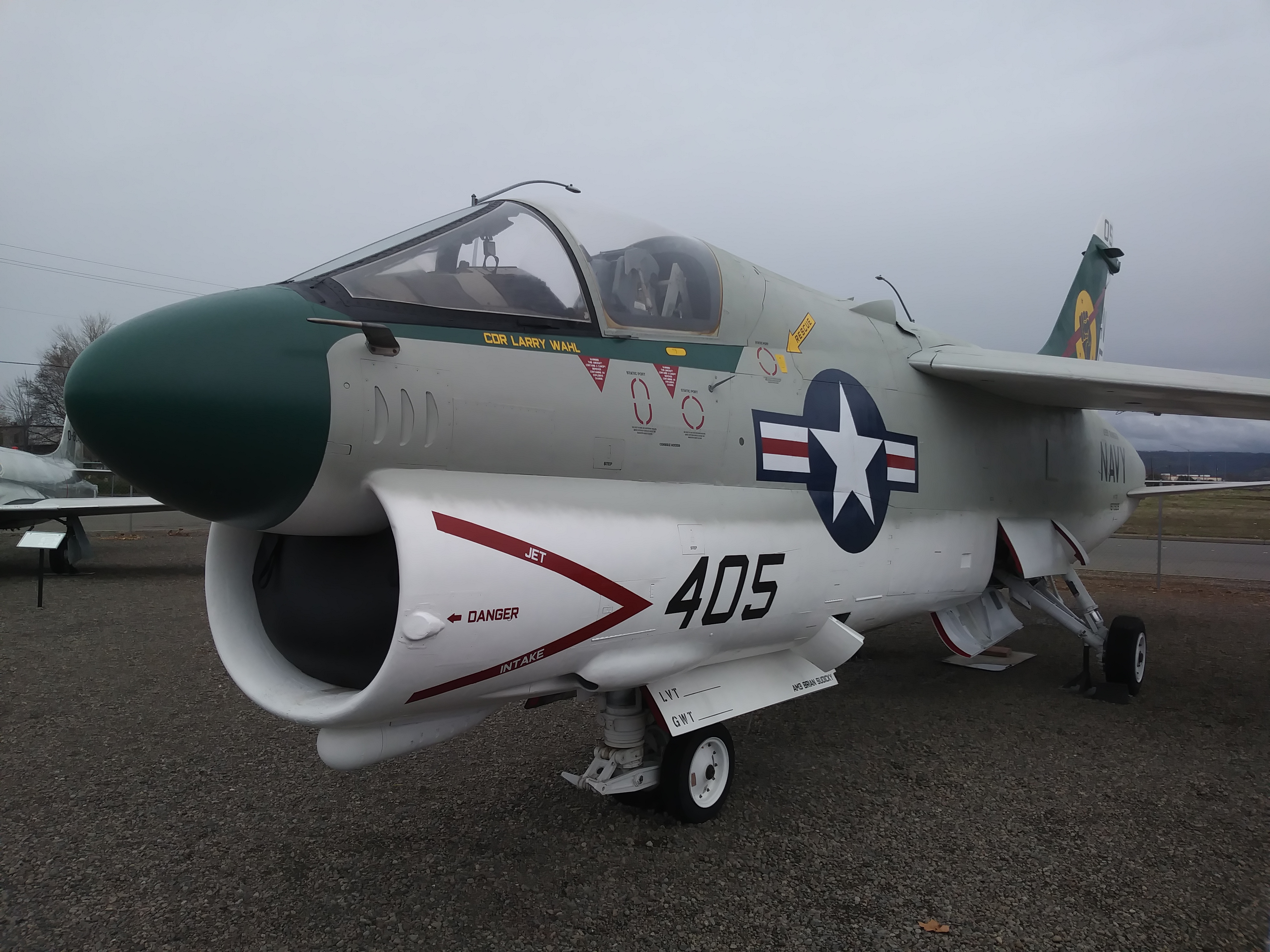
A-7D Corsair II after being re-painted as an A-7E from VA-25

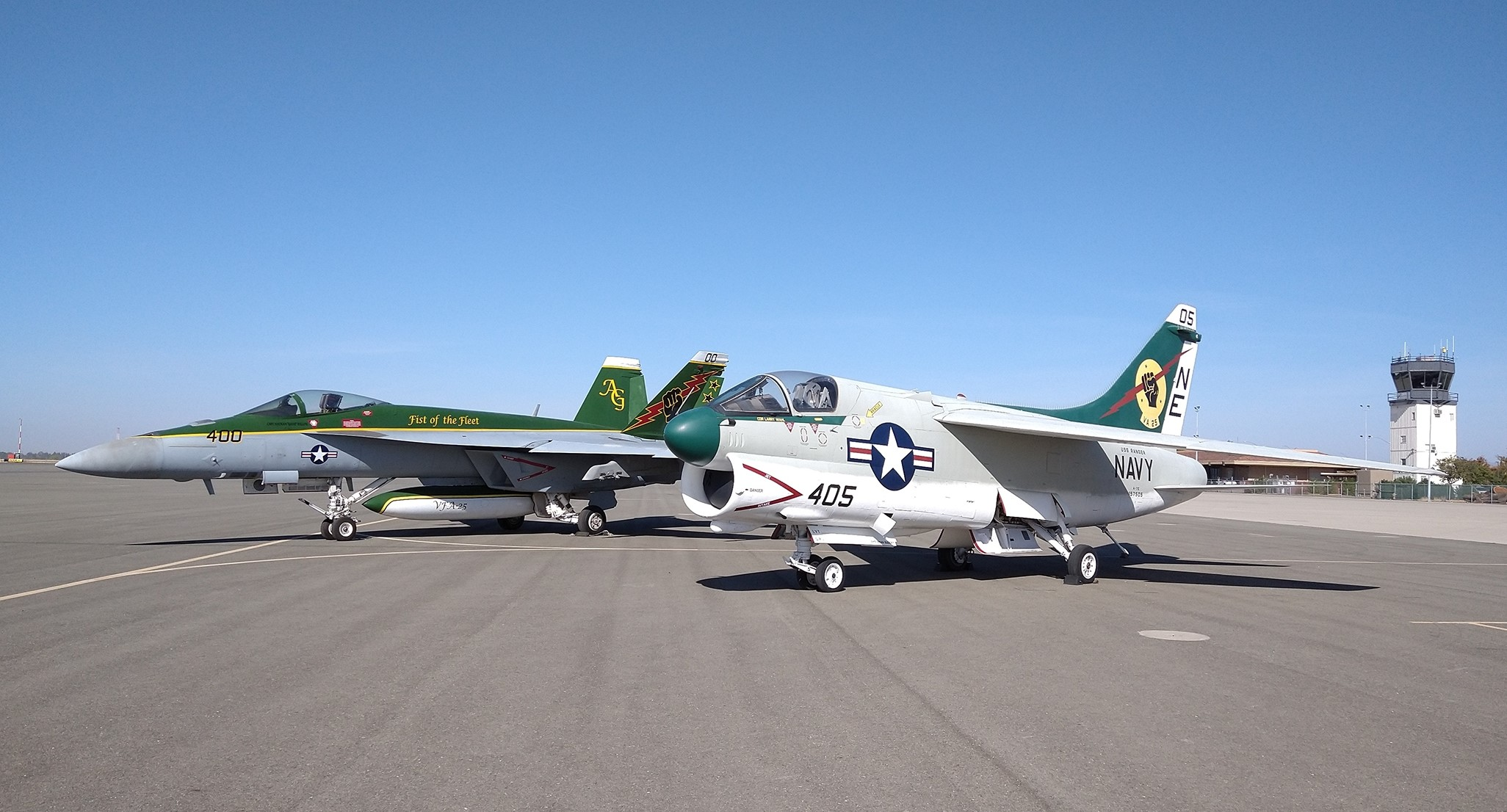
Chico Air Museum's A-7 poses next to an F/A-18E from VFA-25. Both Aircraft were featured in the June 2021 issue of Combat Aircraft Journal magazine.

== See also ==
- List of Aerospace Museums
- Chico Army Airfield
