= Haigh Field Airport =

Haigh Field Airport Orland Air Force Auxiliary Field
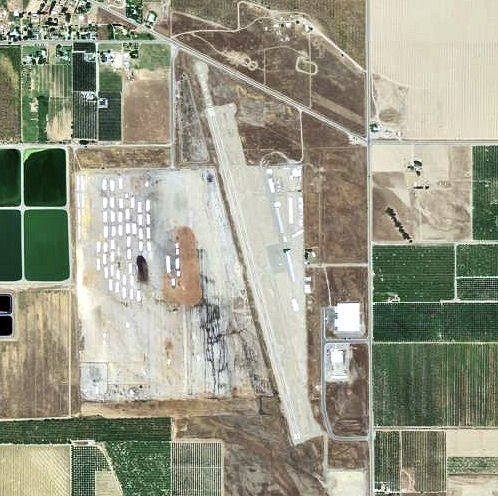
- 2006 USGS photo
- IATA: none; ICAO: none; FAA LID: O37

Summary
- Airport type: Public
- Operator: Glenn County
- Location: Orland, California
- Elevation AMSL: 215 ft (66 m)
- Coordinates: 39°43′16″N 122°08′48″W

Map
- Location of Haigh Field Airport

Runways
| Direction | Length | | Surface |
| Direction | ft | m | Surface |
|---|---|---|---|
| 15/33 | 4,500 | 1,372 | Asphalt |

Haigh Field Airport (FAA LID: O37) is a public airport located three miles (4.8 km) southeast of the central business district (CBD) of Orland, a city in Glenn County, California, United States. It covers 300 acres (121 ha) and has one runway. It is mostly used for general aviation, and was used to train pilots during wartime. In November 2025, the airfield received $1.1 million in grants from the Federal Aviation Administration to realign and reconstruct the primary taxiway, to comply with modern safety standards. In the same year, it was estimated the airport handled 1750 annual aircraft movements.

== World War II ==
During World War II, the airport was designated as Orland Air Force Auxiliary Field, and was an auxiliary training airfield for Chico Army Airfield, California.

== See also ==
- California World War II Army Airfields
