= Chico Regional Airport =

Airport in Butte County, California

Chico Regional Airport Chico Army Airfield
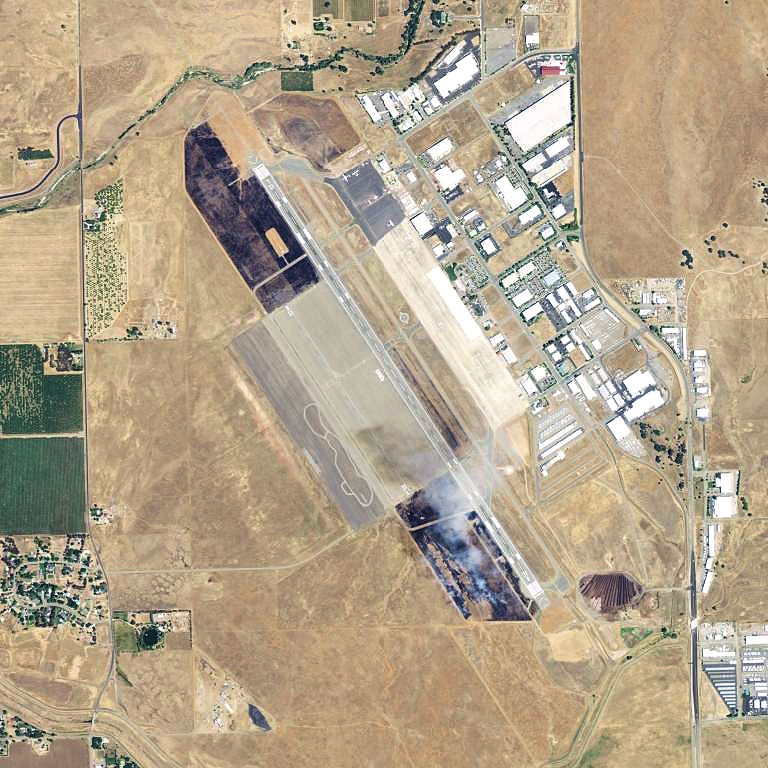
- USGS 2006 orthophoto
- IATA: CIC; ICAO: KCIC; FAA LID: CIC

Summary
- Airport type: Public Use
- Owner: City of Chico
- Operator: City of Chico Public Works
- Serves: Chico, California
- Location: Chico, California, 4 miles (6 km) north of downtown Chico
- Elevation AMSL: 240 ft (73 m)
- Coordinates: 39°47′43″N 121°51′30″W

Maps
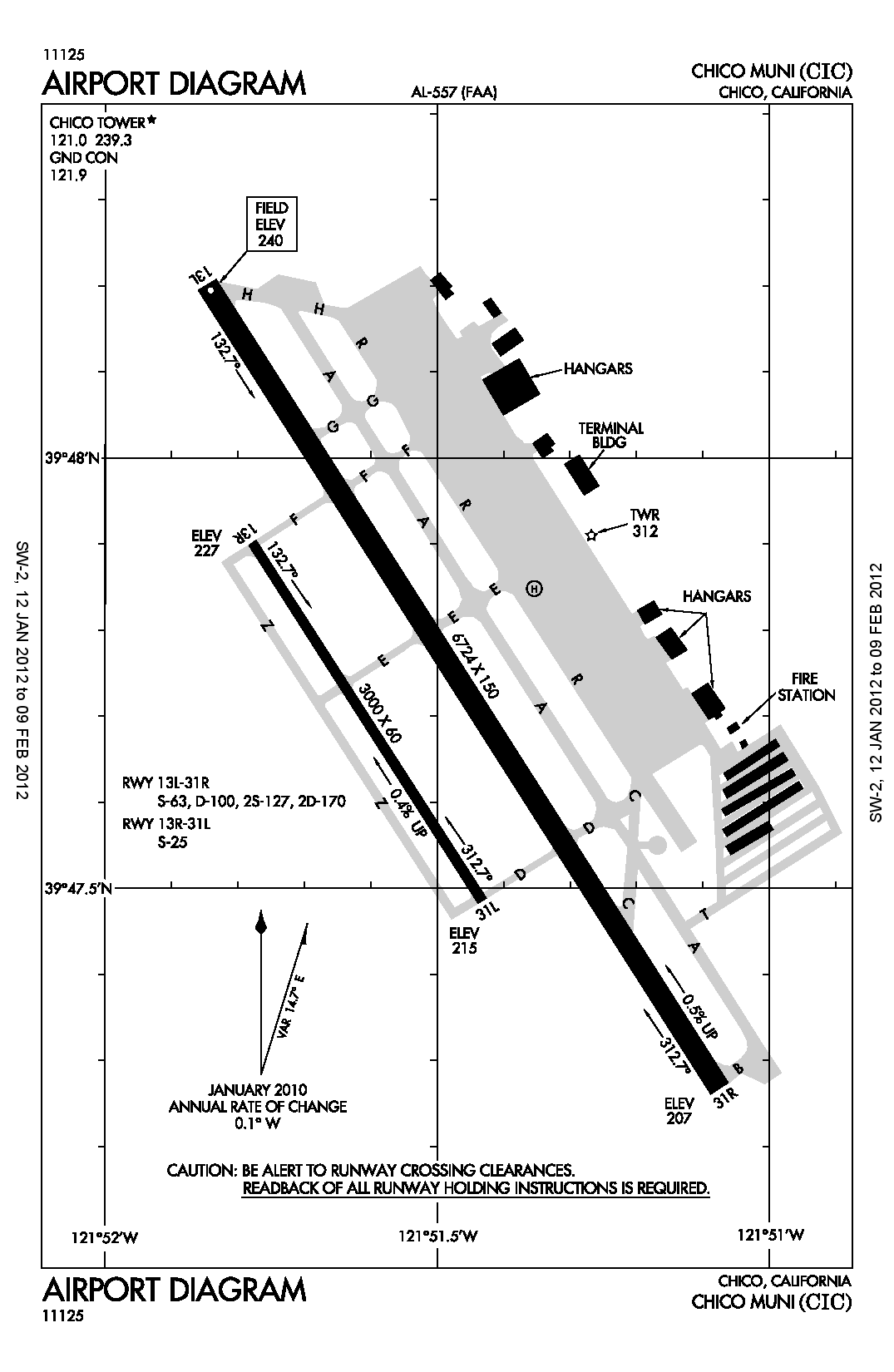

- Location

Runways
Direction	Length		Surface
Direction	ft	m	Surface
13L/31R	6,724	2,049	Asphalt
13R/31L	3,000	914	Asphalt

Helipads
Number	Length		Surface
Number	ft	m	Surface
H1	64	20	Concrete

Statistics (04/2012 – 04/2013)
- Aircraft operations: 48,467
- Based aircraft: 97
- Source: Federal Aviation Administration

Chico Regional Airport (IATA: CIC, ICAO: KCIC, FAA LID: CIC), formerly known as Chico Municipal Airport, is four miles (6 km) north of Chico, in Butte County, California, United States. The airport covers 1,475 acres (6.0 km^{2}), has two runways and one helipad. Its fixed-base operator, Northgate Aviation provides fuel, maintenance, flight training, and charter flights. Though an operational airport with that meets Federal Aviation Regulations Part 139 standards, the airport has not seen active commercial air service since SkyWest Airlines ended service to San Francisco at the end of 2014.

== Airlines and destinations ==
=== Cargo ===
Airlines	Destinations
FedEx Feeder	Sacramento

== Past airline service and Pacific Express ==
Airlines at Chico were American Airlines regional affiliate American Eagle, Hughes Airwest, Pacific Express, Reno Air Express and WestAir operating as United Express.

Southwest Airways and its successors provided the only airline service into Chico from 1947 until June 1979. Two airlines flew jets from Chico: Hughes Airwest with Douglas DC-9s and, from 1982 to 1984, Pacific Express with BAC One-Elevens. Both airlines flew to San Francisco. Hughes Airwest also flew direct DC-9s to Seattle, Phoenix, Las Vegas, Portland, San Jose, and other cities. Prior to the DC-9 service, Air West flew Fairchild F-27s to San Francisco and Portland. From 1982 to 1984, Pacific Express operated one BAC One-Eleven departure a day to San Francisco with some flights making a stop in Sacramento. According to the February 1, 1984, timetable, the airline had a daily morning BAC One-Eleven nonstop to Sacramento continuing to San Francisco, Bakersfield and Santa Barbara. Other airlines included American Eagle, Reno Air Express and WestAir which flew smaller turboprops such as the BAe Jetstream 31 mainly to San Francisco or San Jose.

Service flown by SkyWest Airlines operating as United Express with Embraer EMB-120 Brasilias nonstop to San Francisco ended on December 2, 2014. The airport now has no scheduled passenger air service.

Pacific Express was based in Chico, but ceased all flight operations in early 1984. Pacific Express flew to 22 cities in California, Nevada, Oregon, Idaho, and Washington with BAC One-Elevens and Boeing 737-200s. The airline had ordered new BAe 146-200s but never took delivery. Several of these BAe 146s were acquired by Pacific Southwest Airlines (PSA). Pacific Express briefly had a code sharing agreement with Pan American World Airways (Pan Am) when the airline operated as Pan Am Pacific Express.

== History ==
The City of Chico built a small airport on 160 acres (0.65 km^{2}) of land five miles (8 km) north of the city in the late 1930s and leased the facility to a fixed-base operator. The airport was expanded in 1941 to help serve the needs of the United States military, on 11 September 1941, when the City Council of Chico signed a lease with the U.S. Army Corps of Engineers (representing the War Department) for the use of 1,045 acres (4.2 km^{2}) of land at $1 per year with an option to buy. The city also provided all utilities and service roads to the field. Between four and five million dollars were allocated for construction of all needed facilities in a very short time, as at other bases. Eventually 140 buildings as well as runways, aprons and service roads were built.

Chico Army Airfield was under the command of the 10th Army Air Force Base Unit, AAF West Coast Training Center, Army Air Forces Training Command. Chico AAF also had five auxiliary landing fields:

- Orland Auxiliary Field No. 1 39°43′16″N 122°08′44″W now the Haigh Field Airport
- Kirkwood Auxiliary Field No. 2 39°47′20″N 122°07′31″W (no remains, abandoned)
- Vina Auxiliary Field No. 3 39°56′54″N 121°59′29″W (now private Deer Creek Ranch Airport, 3000 ft square mat field)
- Campbell Auxiliary Field No. 4 39°54′10″N 121°55′43″W (abandoned all-way field, slight traces of runways)
- Oroville Auxiliary Field No. 5 39°34′58″N 121°38′24″W (abandoned all-way field, slight traces of runways)
- Siskiyou County Army Airfield 41°46′53″N 122°28′05″W (now Siskiyou County Airport)

On 15 April 1942 the first cadre of permanent troops who managed the field moved in. The field was opened as the Chico Army Flying School on April 15, 1942. The first cadets arrived on April 25, 1942, from Moffett Field where they had completed part of their basic flying in addition to their primary training. Basic training at Chico began on July 28, 1942.

Chico Army Air Field 1942 Classbook

An all black company was assigned to the Field in August 1942. The first WACs arrived in October 1943. A cadre of black WACs was housed on an eleven-acre site across Cohasset Road from the Field. WASPS (Women's Army Service Pilots) frequently delivered planes to the field. At its peak Chico Army Air Field had about 4,000 personnel. In the first two years, it trained 5,500 cadets and thousands of ground personnel.

In April 1944 the mission of the field was changed from basic flying training of cadets to training of fighter pilots. An April 24, 1944, the field was transferred from the Western Flying Training Command to the IV Fighter Command.

The new command brought in pilots who had completed their basic and advanced training and received commissions prior to coming to Chico. Here they were to be taught tactics of combat flying using Bell King Cobra (P-63) planes, later switching to the twin-engine Lockheed P-38 Lightnings. These were all propeller planes. In May 1945 jet training was introduced on the P-59 jet trainers, and in July the P-51 `Mustangs. On August 25, 1945 IV Fighter Command was replaced by the 21st Bombardment Wing. Its function was to process both personnel and aircraft for overseas assignment. In October 1945 the wing was redesignated the First Staging Command. Now the planes being processed were B-29 Superfortress bombers and crews.

Chico Army Air Field was deactivated on December 31, 1945. The property was excessed and transferred by the U.S. Army to the General Services Administration (GSA) for disposal. The lease on 1,045.3 acres was terminated on June 8, 1948. The lease termination agreement included the transfer of all U.S. Government constructed improvements to the City of Chico. GSA transferred the 10.97 acres to the City of Chico by deed dated January 28, 1949. The total acreage disposed was 1,056.27.

=== Honorary Naming ===
On May 19, 1992, the City of Chico City Council unilaterally adopted Resolution No. 146 91-92, formally naming Chico Airport "The Jean Morony Airfield" in honor of local judge and aviation advocate Jean Morony. Judge Morony is often credited as being one of the forefathers of aviation in Butte County, having been directly involved with the establishment of US Army Air Corps training activities in Chico and later as one of the key-figures in Chico aviation affairs spanning the mid-to-late-20th century. As of 2023, this name is not in regular use, however remains recognized by a plaque at the Chico Regional Airport passenger terminal.

=== Strategic Air Command ===
On 30 January 1959 the Air Force announced plans to conduct surveys in the vicinity of Beale Air Force Base to determine the feasibility for missile bases. A Titan-I ICBM was located on the north side of the airport from 1962 to 1965, part of Beale AFB's 851st Strategic Missile Squadron system of several ICBMs centered around Marysville. Its formal designation was Beale 851-C. The last missile was lowered into the Chico complex 4C on April 20, 1962.

The Chico missile complex had two accidents in 1962. On 24 May during a contractor checkout, a terrific blast rocked launcher 1 at the complex, destroying a Titan I and causing heavy damage to the silo. On 6 June trouble again struck as a flash fire at another silo killed a worker. After the investigation, the Air Force concluded that the two separate explosions occurred because of a blocked vent and blocked valve. The silo was repaired and put back into operational service.

Today, the site has all three launch silos capped, but some development has taken place on the launch area, with a retention pond, some trees, and some single-story buildings being erected. It appears to be in use for some type of quarrying/grading material which is transported to construction sites in the Chico area.

=== In popular culture ===
Top Gun: Maverick was filmed in the foothills outside Chico in July 2019 for the final scenes between the F-14 and two SU-57's, which was performed using two L-39's and CGI. The film crew spent 10 days filming and secretly used the Chico Airport for a staging area. Geographic identifiers in the film include the Feather River Canyon, Bucks Lake, Feather Falls and Mount Lassen.

=== 2022 Renaming Effort ===
On November 15, 2022, the Chico City Council passed a motion to rename Chico Municipal Airport to Chico Regional Airport. “The purpose of renaming the airport is to represent the entire area it serves and will serve when air service returns,” said Erik Gustafson, Director of Public Works Operations and Maintenance. “We are not innovators on this. Commonly airports are renamed to gain a larger market share.” The City hired an airport marketing firm that agreed on the word “regional” adding value and keeping “Chico” to associate incoming travelers with known Chico amenities.

== Air attack base ==
Chico Air Attack Base (CAAB) was established in 1969. Two aircraft are stationed at the base, an S-2 Tracker and an OV-10 Bronco. The base has three retardant loading stations and it can supply up to 100,000 U.S. gallons of retardant per day.

== Ground Transportation ==
Butte Regional Transit offers weekday bus service from Oroville and Chico to the airport via the #52 bus.

== See also ==
- California World War II Army Airfields
- Aero Union
- 35th Flying Training Wing (World War II)
- Chico Air Museum
