= Pacific Express =

US low cost airline (1982–1982)

IATA	ICAO	Call sign
VB	WCA	-
- Founded: 1981
- Commenced operations: January 22, 1982
- Ceased operations: February 2, 1984
- Operating bases: Chico Municipal Airport
- Fleet size: See Fleet below
- Destinations: Western United States, see Destinations below
- Headquarters: Chico, California, U.S.
- Employees: 800

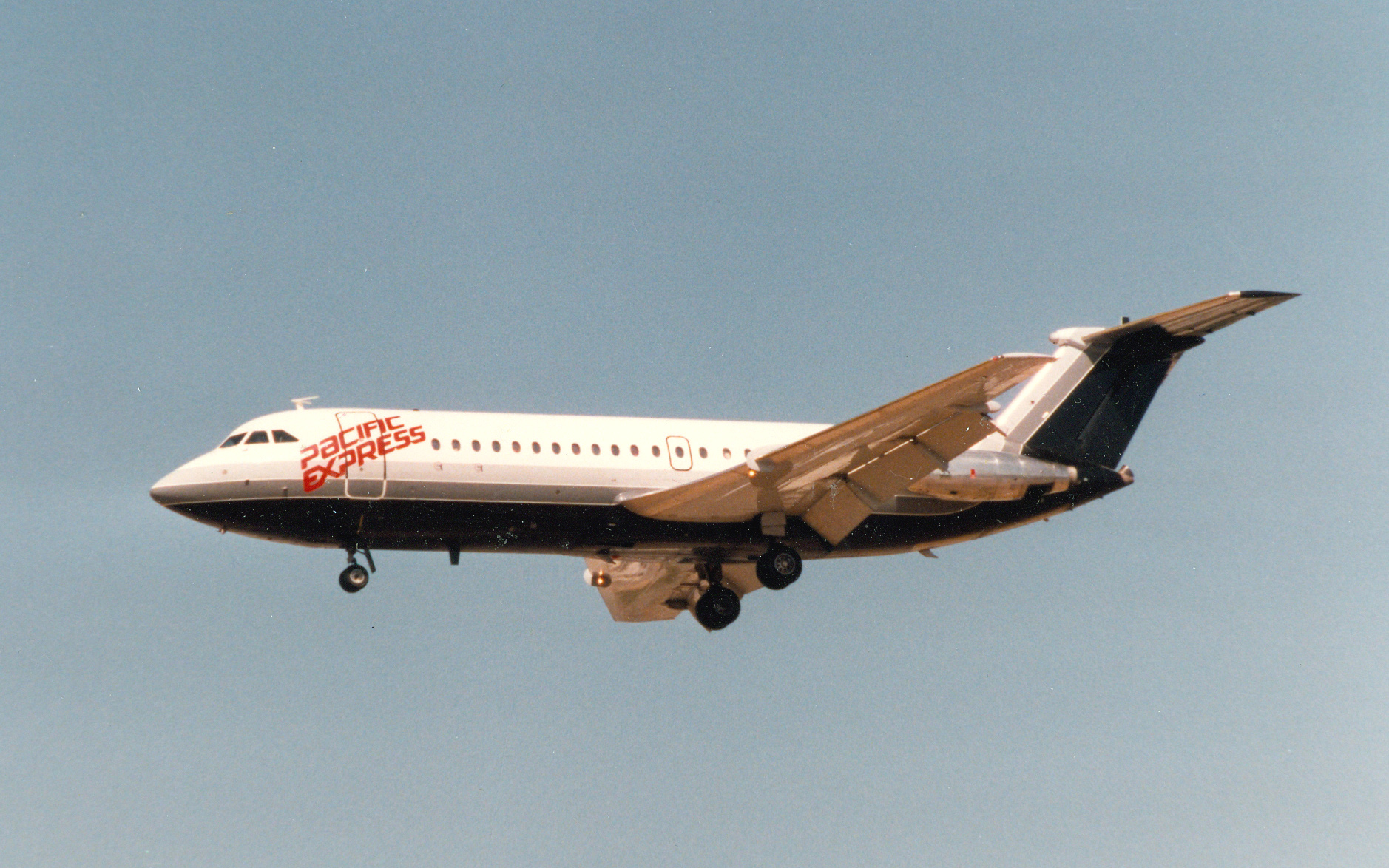
BAC 1-11 landing at San Jose 1982

Pacific Express was an all-jet airline in the western United States from 1982 to early 1984, based in Chico, California. It later marketed itself as Pan Am Pacific Express reflecting a marketing agreement between Pan American World Airways (Pan Am) and the carrier for connecting passenger traffic at Los Angeles and San Francisco. At one point, Pacific Express served 22 destinations in the western United States. It was a subsidiary of WestAir Jet Inc.

Pacific Express initially operated seven British Aircraft Corporation BAC One-Eleven twin jets and subsequently then added Boeing 737-200s. It had six new British Aerospace BAe 146-200s on order but never took delivery; some of these BAe 146s were then purchased by Pacific Southwest Airlines (PSA).

Shortly after its second anniversary Pacific Express filed for bankruptcy in federal court and abruptly ceased operations on Thursday, February 2, 1984.

The name Pacific Express is now the callsign of Pacific Airlines, the second largest airline in Vietnam.

== Destinations ==
From the Pacific Express system timetable dated December 1, 1983.

- Bakersfield, California (BFL)
- Boise, Idaho (BOI)
- Chico, California (CIC) - Headquarters
- Fresno, California (FAT)
- Klamath Falls, Oregon (LMT)
- Las Vegas, Nevada (LAS)
- Los Angeles, California (LAX)
- Medford, Oregon (MFR)
- Modesto, California (MOD)
- Monterey, California (MRY)
- Oakland, California (OAK)
- Palm Springs, California (PSP)
- Portland, Oregon (PDX)
- Redding, California (RDD)
- Redmond/Bend, Oregon (RDM)
- Reno, Nevada (RNO)
- Sacramento, California (SMF)
- San Francisco, California (SFO)
- San Jose, California (SJC)
- Santa Barbara, California (SBA)
- Spokane, Washington (GEG)
- Stockton, California (SCK)

== Jet Fleet ==
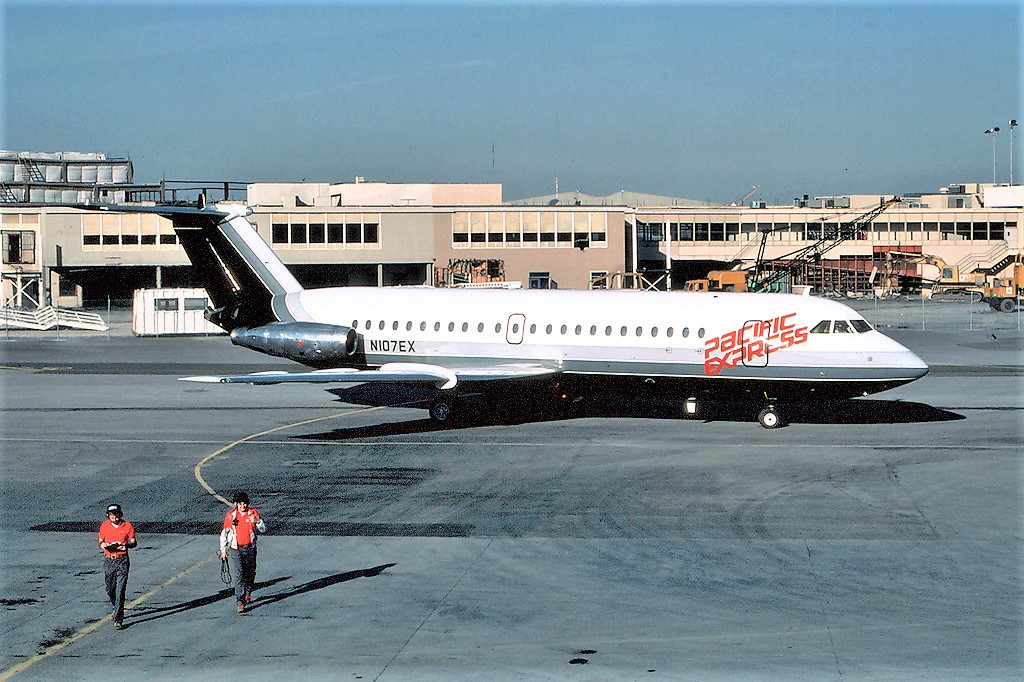
BAC One-Eleven in 1982

- Boeing 737-200
- BAC One-Eleven

Ordered but not delivered:

- BAe 146-200

== See also ==
- List of defunct airlines of the United States
