= Benton Field =

Airport in California, United States

Coordinates: 40°34′27″N 122°24′27″W

Benton Field Benton Airpark
- IATA: BZF; ICAO: none; FAA LID: O85

Summary
- Airport type: Public
- Owner: City of Redding
- Serves: Redding, California
- Elevation AMSL: 719 ft (219 m)
- Interactive map of Benton Field

Runways
Direction	Length		Surface
Direction	ft	m	Surface
15/33	2,420	738	Asphalt

Statistics (2002)
- Aircraft operations: 35,000
- Based aircraft: 122
- Sources: airport website and FAA

Benton Field (IATA: BZF, FAA LID: O85), also known as Benton Airpark, is a city-owned public-use airport located one mile (1.6 km) west of the central business district of Redding, a city in Shasta County, California, United States. It is one of two airports located in the City of Redding, the other being Redding Municipal Airport.

The airport is named for Lt. John W. Benton, an Army Air Corps pilot and a Shasta County resident who died in an airplane crash at Buenos Aires in 1927. The original small airstrip opened on July 4, 1929.

== Disambiguation ==
Benton Field was also one name used during the 1930s by the United States Army Air Corps to refer to the airport which later became the Naval Air Station Alameda (on the east side of San Francisco Bay) during World War II.

== Facilities and aircraft ==
Benton Field covers an area of 80 acres (32 ha) with one runway designated 15/33 with a 2,420 x 80 ft (738 x 24 m) asphalt surface. The airport features parallel taxiways on both the East and West side of the runway with parking and hangars on each side of the runway.

During 2002 the airport had 35,000 aircraft operations, an average of 95 per day: 97% general aviation and 3% air taxi. There are 122 aircraft based at this airport: 93% single-engine, 5% multi-engine and 2% helicopter.

Benton Field is the headquarters of the California Highway Patrol Northern Division Air Operations unit. The unit includes two single-engine CHP airplanes and two CHP helicopters based at the airpark.
