= List of airports by ICAO code: KR-KZ =

List of airports by ICAO code: A - B - C - D - EB-EG - EH-EY - FA-FM - FN-FZ - G - H - ~~I~~ - J - KA-KH - KI-KP - KR-KZ - LA-LJ - LK-LZ - M - N - O - P - Q - R - SA-SC - SD-SH - SI - SJ - SK-SM - SN-SP - SQ - SS-SU - SV-SY - T - U - V - W - ~~X~~ - YA-YG - YH-YQ - YR-YZ - Z

== KR ==
ICAO	IATA	Airport name	Community	State	Coordinates	Notes
KRAC	RAC	John H. Batten Airport (Batten International Airport)	Racine	Wisconsin	42°45′40″N 087°48′50″W	
KRAL		Riverside Municipal Airport	Riverside	California	33°57′07″N 117°26′42″W	
KRAP	RAP	Rapid City Regional Airport	Rapid City	South Dakota	44°02′43″N 103°03′26″W	
KRAS		Mustang Beach Airport	Port Aransas	Texas	27°48′42″N 097°05′20″W	
KRAW	RAW	Warsaw Municipal Airport	Warsaw	Missouri	38°20′49″N 093°20′44″W	
KRBD	RBD	Dallas Executive Airport	Dallas	Texas	32°40′51″N 096°52′06″W	
KRBE		Rock County Airport	Bassett	Nebraska	42°34′16″N 099°34′10″W	
KRBG	RBG	Roseburg Regional Airport (Major General Marion E. Carl Memorial Field)	Roseburg	Oregon	43°14′20″N 123°21′21″W	
KRBL		Red Bluff Municipal Airport	Red Bluff	California	40°09′03″N 122°15′08″W	
KRBM		Robinson Army Airfield	Camp Robinson	Arkansas	34°51′00″N 092°18′01″W	
KRBO		Nueces County Airport	Robstown	Texas	27°46′41″N 097°41′24″W	
KRBW	RBW	Lowcountry Regional Airport	Walterboro	South Carolina	32°55′16″N 080°38′26″W	
KRCA		Ellsworth Air Force Base	Rapid City	South Dakota	44°08′47″N 103°04′29″W	
KRCE	RCE	Clarence E. Page Municipal Airport	Oklahoma City	Oklahoma	35°29′17″N 097°49′25″W	
KRCK	RCK	H. H. Coffield Regional Airport	Rockdale	Texas	30°37′54″N 096°59′23″W	
KRCM		SkyHaven Airport	Warrensburg	Missouri	38°47′03″N 093°48′10″W	
KRCP		Rooks County Regional Airport	Stockton	Kansas	39°20′48″N 099°18′17″W	
KRCR	RCR	Fulton County Airport	Rochester	Indiana	41°03′56″N 086°10′54″W	
KRCT	RCT	Nartron Field	Reed City	Michigan	43°54′06″N 085°30′58″W	Closed
KRCV		Astronaut Kent Rominger Airport	Del Norte	Colorado	37°42′49″N 106°21′14″W	
KRCX		Rusk County Airport	Ladysmith	Wisconsin	45°29′48″N 091°00′01″W	
KRCZ		Richmond County Airport	Rockingham	North Carolina	34°53′29″N 079°45′35″W	
KRDD	RDD	Redding Municipal Airport	Redding	California	40°30′32″N 122°17′36″W	
KRDG	RDG	Reading Regional Airport	Reading	Pennsylvania	40°22′43″N 075°57′55″W	
KRDK		Red Oak Municipal Airport	Red Oak	Iowa	41°00′39″N 095°15′32″W	
KRDM	RDM	Roberts Field (Redmond Municipal Airport)	Redmond	Oregon	44°15′15″N 121°08′59″W	
KRDR		Grand Forks Air Force Base	Grand Forks	North Dakota	47°57′50″N 097°24′04″W	
KRDU	RDU	Raleigh-Durham International Airport	Raleigh	North Carolina	35°52′40″N 078°47′15″W	
KRED		Red Lodge Airport	Red Lodge	Montana	45°11′10″N 109°15′28″W	
KREG		Louisiana Regional Airport	Gonzalez	Louisiana	30°10′22″N 090°56′26″W	
KREI		Redlands Municipal Airport	Redlands	California	34°05′07″N 117°08′47″W	
KREO		Rome State Airport	Rome	Oregon	42°34′40″N 117°53′08″W	
KRFD	RFD	Chicago Rockford International Airport	Rockford	Illinois	42°11′43″N 089°05′50″W	
KRFG	RFG	Rooke Field	Refugio	Texas	28°17′37″N 097°19′23″W	
KRFI		Rusk County Airport	Henderson	Texas	32°08′30″N 094°51′06″W	
KRFK	RFK	Rollang Field	Rolling Fork	Mississippi	32°57′15″N 090°50′45″W	Closed
KRGA		Central Kentucky Regional Airport	Richmond	Kentucky	37°37′51″N 084°19′56″W	
KRGK		Red Wing Regional Airport	Red Wing	Minnesota	44°35′22″N 092°29′06″W	
KRHI	RHI	Rhinelander-Oneida County Airport	Rhinelander	Wisconsin	45°37′51″N 089°27′59″W	
KRHP		Western Carolina Regional Airport	Andrews	North Carolina	35°11′43″N 083°51′47″W	
KRHV		Reid-Hillview Airport of Santa Clara County	San Jose	California	37°19′58″N 121°49′11″W	
KRIC	RIC	Richmond International Airport	Sandston	Virginia	37°30′18″N 077°19′10″W	
KRID		Richmond Municipal Airport	Richmond	Indiana	39°45′22″N 084°50′34″W	
KRIF		Richfield Municipal Airport	Richfield	Utah	38°44′03″N 112°06′06″W	
KRIL	RIL	Garfield County Regional Airport	Rifle	Colorado	39°31′34″N 107°43′33″W	
KRIR		Flabob Airport	Riverside	California	33°59′20″N 117°24′36″W	
KRIU		Rancho Murieta Airport	Rancho Murieta	California	38°29′12″N 121°06′10″W	
KRIV		March Air Reserve Base	Riverside	California	33°53′20″N 117°15′36″W	
KRIW	RIW	Central Wyoming Regional Airport	Riverton	Wyoming	43°03′51″N 108°27′35″W	
KRJD		Ridgely Airpark	Ridgely	Maryland	38°58′14″N 075°52′05″W	
KRKD	RKD	Knox County Regional Airport	Rockland	Maine	44°03′36″N 069°05′57″W	
KRKP	RKP	Aransas County Airport	Rockport	Texas	28°05′10″N 097°02′37″W	
KRKR		Robert S. Kerr Airport	Poteau	Oklahoma	35°01′18″N 094°37′16″W	
KRKS	RKS	Southwest Wyoming Regional Airport	Rock Springs	Wyoming	41°35′39″N 109°03′55″W	
KRKW	RKW	Rockwood Municipal Airport	Rockwood	Tennessee	35°55′20″N 084°41′23″W	
KRLD		Richland Airport	Richland	Washington	46°18′20″N 119°18′15″W	
KRME	RME	Griffiss International Airport	Rome	New York	43°14′02″N 075°24′25″W	
KRMG	RMG	Richard B. Russell Airport	Rome	Georgia	34°21′03″N 085°09′31″W	
KRMN		Stafford Regional Airport	Stafford	Virginia	38°23′53″N 077°27′20″W	
KRMY		Brooks Field	Marshall	Michigan	42°15′04″N 084°57′20″W	
KRNC	RNC	Warren County Memorial Airport	McMinnville	Tennessee	35°41′55″N 085°50′38″W	
KRND		Randolph Air Force Base	San Antonio	Texas	29°31′46″N 098°16′44″W	
KRNH	RNH	New Richmond Regional Airport	New Richmond	Wisconsin	45°08′52″N 092°32′21″W	
KRNM		Ramona Airport	Ramona	California	33°02′21″N 116°54′55″W	
KRNO	RNO	Reno-Tahoe International Airport	Reno	Nevada	39°29′57″N 119°46′05″W	
KRNP		Owosso Community Airport	Owosso	Michigan	42°59′35″N 084°08′19″W	
KRNT	RNT	Renton Municipal Airport	Renton	Washington	47°29′35″N 122°12′57″W	
KRNV		Cleveland Municipal Airport	Cleveland	Mississippi	33°45′40″N 090°45′28″W	
KROA	ROA	Roanoke-Blacksburg Regional Airport (Woodrum Field)	Roanoke	Virginia	37°19′32″N 079°58′32″W	
KROC	ROC	Greater Rochester International Airport	Rochester	New York	43°07′08″N 077°40′21″W	
KROG		Rogers Executive Airport (Carter Field)	Rogers	Arkansas	36°22′21″N 094°06′25″W	
KROS		Rush City Regional Airport	Rush City	Minnesota	45°42′12″N 092°58′26″W	
KROW	ROW	Roswell International Air Center	Roswell	New Mexico	33°18′06″N 104°31′50″W	
KROX	ROX	Roseau Municipal Airport	Roseau	Minnesota	48°51′26″N 095°41′53″W	
KRPB		Belleville Municipal Airport	Belleville	Kansas	39°49′04″N 097°39′35″W	
KRPD		Rice Lake Regional Airport (Carl's Field)	Rice Lake	Wisconsin	45°25′12″N 091°46′24″W	
KRPH		Graham Municipal Airport	Graham	Texas	33°06′37″N 098°33′19″W	
KRPJ		Rochelle Municipal Airport	Rochelle	Illinois	41°53′35″N 089°04′42″W	
KRPX		Roundup Airport	Roundup	Montana	46°28′30″N 108°32′36″W	
KRQB	WBR	Roben–Hood Airport	Big Rapids	Michigan	43°43′21″N 085°30′15″W	
KRQE		Window Rock Airport	Window Rock	Arizona	35°39′07″N 109°04′03″W	
KRQO		El Reno Regional Airport	El Reno	Oklahoma	35°28′22″N 098°00′21″W	
KRRL	RRL	Merrill Municipal Airport	Merrill	Wisconsin	45°11′56″N 089°42′46″W	
KRRQ		Rock Rapids Municipal Airport	Rock Rapids	Iowa	43°27′08″N 096°10′47″W	
KRRT	RRT	Warroad International Memorial Airport (Swede Carlson Field)	Warroad	Minnesota	48°56′29″N 095°20′54″W	
KRSL		Russell Municipal Airport	Russell	Kansas	38°52′20″N 098°48′42″W	
KRSN	RSN	Ruston Regional Airport	Ruston	Louisiana	32°30′53″N 092°35′18″W	
KRST	RST	Rochester International Airport	Rochester	Minnesota	43°54′30″N 092°30′00″W	
KRSV		Crawford County Airport	Robinson	Illinois	39°00′58″N 087°38′59″W	
KRSW	RSW	Southwest Florida International Airport	Fort Myers	Florida	26°32′10″N 081°45′19″W	
KRTN	RTN	Raton Municipal Airport/Crews Field	Raton	New Mexico	36°44′30″N 104°30′08″W	
KRTS		Reno Stead Airport	Reno	Nevada	39°40′05″N 119°52′35″W	
KRUE		Russellville Regional Airport	Russellville	Arkansas	35°15′33″N 093°05′36″W	
KRUG		Rugby Municipal Airport	Rugby	North Dakota	48°23′25″N 100°01′27″W	
KRUQ	SRW	Mid-Carolina Regional Airport	Salisbury	North Carolina	35°38′45″N 080°31′13″W	
KRUT	RUT	Rutland-Southern Vermont Regional Airport	Rutland	Vermont	43°31′48″N 072°56′59″W	
KRVF		Twin Bridges Airport	Twin Bridges	Montana	45°32′01″N 112°18′09″W	
KRVJ		Swinton Smith Field	Reidsville	Georgia	32°03′34″N 082°09′14″W	
KRVL		Mifflin County Airport	Reedsville	Pennsylvania	40°40′39″N 077°37′37″W	
KRVN		Hawkins County Airport	Surgoinsville	Tennessee	36°27′27″N 082°53′06″W	
KRVS	RVS	Richard Lloyd Jones Jr. Airport	Tulsa	Oklahoma	36°02′23″N 095°59′05″W	
KRWF	RWF	Redwood Falls Municipal Airport	Redwood Falls	Minnesota	44°32′49″N 095°04′55″W	
KRWI		Rocky Mount-Wilson Regional Airport	Rocky Mount	North Carolina	35°51′23″N 077°53′31″W	
KRWL		Rawlins Municipal Airport	Rawlins	Wyoming	41°48′20″N 107°12′00″W	
KRWN		Arens Field	Winamac	Indiana	41°05′36″N 086°36′18″W	
KRWV		Caldwell Municipal Airport	Caldwell	Texas	30°30′56″N 096°42′15″W	
KRXE		Rexburg-Madison County Airport	Rexburg	Idaho	43°50′02″N 111°48′18″W	
KRYA		Wray Municipal Airport	Wray	Colorado	40°06′01″N 102°14′28″W	
KRYM		Ray S. Miller Army National Guard Airport	Little Falls	Minnesota	46°05′28″N 094°21′38″W	
KRYN		Ryan Airfield	Tucson	Arizona	32°08′32″N 111°10′28″W	
KRYV		Watertown Municipal Airport	Watertown	Wisconsin	43°10′11″N 088°43′24″W	
KRYW		Lago Vista TX-Rusty Allen Airport	Lago Vista	Texas	30°29′55″N 097°58′10″W	
KRYY		Cobb County International-McCollum Field Airport	Kennesaw	Georgia	34°00′47″N 084°35′55″W	
KRZL		Jasper County Airport	Rensselaer	Indiana	40°56′52″N 087°10′57″W	
KRZN		Burnett County Airport	Siren	Wisconsin	45°49′24″N 092°22′25″W	
KRZR		Cleveland Regional Jetport	Cleveland	Tennessee	35°12′41″N 084°47′59″W	
KRZT		Ross County Airport	Chillicothe	Ohio	39°26′25″N 083°01′24″W	
KRZZ		Halifax County Airport	Roanoke Rapids	North Carolina	36°26′22″N 077°42′34″W	Closed

== KS ==
ICAO	IATA	Airport name	Community	State	Coordinates	Notes
KSAA		Shively Airport	Saratoga	Wyoming	41°26′41″N 106°49′25″W	
KSAC		Sacramento Executive Airport	Sacramento	California	38°30′45″N 121°29′36″W	
KSAD	SAD	Safford Regional Airport	Safford	Arizona	32°51′12″N 109°38′06″W	
KSAF	SAF	Santa Fe Regional Airport	Santa Fe	New Mexico	35°37′02″N 106°05′22″W	
KSAN	SAN	San Diego International Airport	San Diego	California	32°44′01″N 117°11′23″W	
KSAR	SAR	Sparta Community Airport	Sparta	Illinois	38°08′59″N 089°41′58″W	
KSAS		Salton Sea Airport	Salton City	California	33°14′28″N 115°57′09″W	
KSAT	SAT	San Antonio International Airport	San Antonio	Texas	29°31′36″N 098°28′19″W	
KSAV	SAV	Savannah/Hilton Head International Airport	Savannah	Georgia	32°07′39″N 081°12′08″W	
KSAW	MQT	Sawyer International Airport	Marquette	Michigan	46°21′13″N 087°23′43″W	
KSAZ		Staples Municipal Airport	Staples	Minnesota	46°22′51″N 094°48′24″W	
KSBA	SBA	Santa Barbara Municipal Airport	Santa Barbara	California	34°25′34″N 119°50′25″W	
KSBD	SBD	San Bernardino International Airport	San Bernardino	California	34°05′42″N 117°14′06″W	
KSBM	SBM	Sheboygan County Memorial Airport	Sheboygan	Wisconsin	43°46′11″N 087°51′06″W	
KSBN	SBN	South Bend International Airport	South Bend	Indiana	41°42′30″N 086°19′02″W	
KSBO		East Georgia Regional Airport	Swainsboro	Georgia	32°36′32″N 082°22′11″W	
KSBP		San Luis Obispo County Regional Airport	San Luis Obispo	California	35°14′13″N 120°38′31″W	
KSBS	SBS	Steamboat Springs Airport (Bob Adams Field)	Steamboat Springs	Colorado	40°30′58″N 106°51′59″W	
KSBU		Blue Earth Municipal Airport	Blue Earth	Minnesota	43°45′44″N 094°05′34″W	
KSBX		Shelby Airport	Shelby	Montana	48°32′26″N 111°52′16″W	
KSBY	SBY	Salisbury-Ocean City-Wicomico Regional Airport (SBY Regional Airport)	Salisbury	Maryland	38°20′24″N 075°30′34″W	
KSCA		Sidney City Airport	Sidney	Ohio	40°14′29″N 084°09′03″W	
KSCB		Scribner State Airport	Scribner	Nebraska	41°36′37″N 096°37′48″W	
KSCD		Sylacauga Municipal Airport (Merkel Field)	Sylacauga	Alabama	33°10′19″N 086°18′20″W	
KSCH		Schenectady County Airport	Schenectady	New York	42°51′09″N 073°55′44″W	
KSCK	SCK	Stockton Metropolitan Airport	Stockton	California	37°53′39″N 121°14′18″W	
KSCR		Siler City Municipal Airport	Siler City	North Carolina	35°42′15″N 079°30′15″W	
KSCX		Scott Municipal Airport	Oneida	Tennessee	36°27′20″N 084°35′08″W	
KSDA		Shenandoah Municipal Airport	Shenandoah	Iowa	40°45′06″N 095°24′49″W	
KSDC		Williamson-Sodus Airport	Williamson/Sodus	New York	43°14′05″N 077°07′10″W	
KSDF	SDF	Louisville International Airport	Louisville	Kentucky	38°10′27″N 085°44′11″W	
KSDL	SCF	Scottsdale Airport	Scottsdale	Arizona	33°37′22″N 111°54′38″W	
KSDM		Brown Field Municipal Airport	San Diego	California	32°34′20″N 116°58′49″W	
KSDY		Sidney-Richland Municipal Airport	Sidney	Montana	47°42′25″N 104°11′33″W	
KSEA	SEA	Seattle-Tacoma International Airport	Seattle	Washington	47°26′56″N 122°18′34″W	
KSEE		Gillespie Field	San Diego	California	32°49′34″N 116°58′21″W	
KSEF	SEF	Sebring Regional Airport	Sebring	Florida	27°27′23″N 081°20′33″W	
KSEG	SEG	Penn Valley Airport	Selinsgrove	Pennsylvania	40°49′16″N 076°51′51″W	
KSEM	SEM	Craig Field	Selma	Alabama	32°20′38″N 086°59′16″W	
KSEP		Stephenville Clark Regional Airport	Stephenville	Texas	32°12′55″N 098°10′39″W	
KSEQ		Randolph Air Force Base Auxiliary Airport	Seguin	Texas	29°33′52″N 097°54′09″W	
KSER	SER	Freeman Municipal Airport	Seymour	Indiana	38°55′31″N 085°54′25″W	
KSET		St. Charles County Smartt Airport	St. Charles	Missouri	38°55′47″N 090°25′48″W	
KSEZ	SDX	Sedona Airport	Sedona	Arizona	34°51′00″N 111°47′24″W	
KSFB	SFB	Orlando Sanford International Airport	Sanford	Florida	28°46′40″N 081°14′15″W	
KSFD		Winner Regional Airport (Bob Wiley Field)	Winner	South Dakota	47°40′59″N 117°19′21″W	
KSFF	SFF	Felts Field	Spokane	Washington	43°23′38″N 070°42′29″W	
KSFM		Sanford Seacoast Regional Airport	Sanford	Maine	37°37′08″N 122°22′30″W	
KSFO	SFO	San Francisco International Airport	San Francisco	California	36°40′55″N 076°36′04″W	
KSFQ		Suffolk Executive Airport	Suffolk	Virginia	42°02′46″N 090°06′30″W	
KSFZ		North Central State Airport	Pawtucket	Rhode Island	41°55′15″N 071°29′29″W	
KSGF	SGF	Springfield-Branson National Airport	Springfield	Missouri	37°14′44″N 093°23′19″W	
KSGH	SGH	Springfield–Beckley Municipal Airport	Springfield	Ohio	39°50′25″N 083°50′25″W	
KSGJ		Northeast Florida Regional Airport	St. Augustine	Florida	29°57′33″N 081°20′23″W	
KSGR	SGR	Sugar Land Regional Airport	Sugar Land	Texas	29°37′20″N 095°39′24″W	
KSGS		South St. Paul Municipal Airport	South St. Paul	Minnesota	44°51′26″N 093°01′58″W	
KSGT	SGT	Stuttgart Municipal Airport	Stuttgart	Arkansas	34°35′58″N 091°34′30″W	
KSGU	SGU	St. George Regional Airport	St. George	Utah	37°02′11″N 113°30′37″W	
KSHD	SHD	Shenandoah Valley Regional Airport	Staunton	Virginia	38°15′50″N 078°53′47″W	
KSHL		Sheldon Regional Airport	Sheldon	Iowa	43°12′30″N 095°50′00″W	
KSHN		Sanderson Field	Shelton	Washington	47°14′01″N 123°08′51″W	
KSHR	SHR	Sheridan County Airport	Sheridan	Wyoming	44°46′09″N 106°58′49″W	
KSHV	SHV	Shreveport Regional Airport	Shreveport	Louisiana	32°26′48″N 093°49′32″W	
KSIF		Rockingham County NC Shiloh Airport	Stoneville	North Carolina	36°26′14″N 079°51′04″W	
KSIK	SIK	Sikeston Memorial Municipal Airport	Sikeston	Missouri	36°53′56″N 089°33′42″W	
KSIV	SIV	Sullivan County Airport	Sullivan	Indiana	39°06′53″N 087°26′54″W	
KSIY	SIY	Siskiyou County Airport	Montague	California	41°46′53″N 122°28′05″W	
KSJC	SJC	Norman Y. Mineta San José International Airport	San Jose	California	37°21′47″N 121°55′43″W	
KSJN	SJN	St. Johns Industrial Air Park	St. Johns	Arizona	34°31′07″N 109°22′44″W	
KSJS		Big Sandy Regional Airport	Inez	Kentucky	37°45′04″N 082°38′12″W	
KSJT	SJT	San Angelo Regional Airport (Mathis Field)	San Angelo	Texas	31°21′18″N 100°29′47″W	
KSJX		Beaver Island Airport	Beaver Island	Michigan	45°41′32″N 085°33′59″W	
KSKA		Fairchild Air Force Base	Spokane	Washington	47°36′54″N 117°39′20″W	
KSKF		Kelly Field Annex (formerly Kelly Air Force Base)	San Antonio	Texas	29°23′00″N 098°34′51″W	
KSKI		Sac City Municipal Airport	Sac City	Iowa	42°22′45″N 094°58′47″W	
KSKX		Taos Regional Airport	Taos	New Mexico	36°27′29″N 105°40′21″W	
KSKY	SKY	Griffing Sandusky Airport	Sandusky	Ohio	41°26′00″N 082°39′08″W	Closed
KSLB		Storm Lake Municipal Airport	Storm Lake	Iowa	42°35′50″N 095°14′26″W	
KSLC	SLC	Salt Lake City International Airport	Salt Lake City	Utah	40°47′18″N 111°58′40″W	
KSLE	SLE	McNary Field (Salem Municipal Airport)	Salem	Oregon	44°54′34″N 123°00′09″W	
KSLG	SLG	Smith Field	Siloam Springs	Arkansas	36°11′31″N 094°29′24″W	
KSLH		Cheboygan County Airport	Cheboygan	Michigan	45°39′13″N 084°31′09″W	
KSLI		Los Alamitos Army Airfield	Los Alamitos	California	33°47′24″N 118°03′05″W	
KSLJ		Hagler Army Heliport	Camp Shelby	Mississippi	31°10′26″N 089°11′28″W	
KSLK	SLK	Adirondack Regional Airport	Saranac Lake	New York	44°23′07″N 074°12′22″W	
KSLN	SLN	Salina Regional Airport	Salina	Kansas	38°47′26″N 097°39′08″W	
KSLO	SLO	Salem–Leckrone Airport	Salem	Illinois	38°38′34″N 088°57′51″W	
KSLR		Sulphur Springs Municipal Airport	Sulphur Springs	Texas	33°09′35″N 095°37′16″W	
KSMD	SMD	Smith Field	Fort Wayne	Indiana	41°08′36″N 085°09′10″W	
KSME		Lake Cumberland Regional Airport	Somerset	Kentucky	37°03′13″N 084°36′56″W	
KSMF	SMF	Sacramento International Airport	Sacramento	California	38°41′44″N 121°35′27″W	
KSMN		Lemhi County Airport	Salmon	Idaho	45°07′26″N 113°52′53″W	
KSMO	SMO	Santa Monica Airport (Clover Field)	Santa Monica	California	34°00′57″N 118°27′05″W	
KSMQ		Somerset Airport (George Walker Field)	Somerville	New Jersey	40°37′34″N 074°40′12″W	
KSMS		Sumter Airport	Sumter	South Carolina	33°59′42″N 080°21′41″W	
KSMX	SMX	Santa Maria Public Airport (Capt. G. Allan Hancock Field)	Santa Maria	California	34°53′56″N 120°27′27″W	
KSNA	SNA	John Wayne Airport	Santa Ana	California	33°40′32″N 117°52′06″W	
KSNC		Chester Airport	Chester	Connecticut	41°23′02″N 072°30′21″W	
KSNH		Savannah-Hardin County Airport	Savannah	Tennessee	35°10′13″N 088°12′57″W	
KSNK		Winston Field	Snyder	Texas	32°41′58″N 100°56′54″W	
KSNL	SNL	Shawnee Regional Airport	Shawnee	Oklahoma	35°21′26″N 096°56′34″W	
KSNS	SNS	Salinas Municipal Airport	Salinas	California	36°39′46″N 121°36′23″W	
KSNT		Stanley Airport	Stanley	Idaho	44°12′31″N 114°56′04″W	Closed
KSNY	SNY	Sidney Municipal Airport (Lloyd W. Carr Field)	Sidney	Nebraska	41°05′59″N 102°59′06″W	
KSOA	SOA	Sonora Municipal Airport	Sonora	Texas	30°35′09″N 100°38′56″W	
KSOP	SOP	Moore County Airport (Pinehurst Regional Airport)	Whispering Pines	North Carolina	35°14′14″N 079°23′28″W	
KSOW	SOW	Show Low Regional Airport	Show Low	Arizona	34°15′56″N 110°00′20″W	
KSOY		Sioux Center Municipal Airport	Sioux Center	Iowa	43°08′04″N 096°11′15″W	Closed
KSPA	SPA	Spartanburg Downtown Memorial Airport	Spartanburg	South Carolina	34°54′57″N 081°57′23″W	
KSPB		Scappoose Industrial Airpark	Scappoose	Oregon	45°46′16″N 122°51′43″W	
KSPD		Springfield Municipal Airport	Springfield	Colorado	37°27′31″N 102°37′05″W	
KSPF		Black Hills Airport (Clyde Ice Field)	Spearfish	South Dakota	44°28′49″N 103°46′59″W	
KSPG		Albert Whitted Airport	St. Petersburg	Florida	27°45′54″N 082°37′37″W	
KSPH		Springhill Airport	Springhill	Louisiana	32°59′00″N 093°24′33″W	
KSPI	SPI	Abraham Lincoln Capital Airport	Springfield	Illinois	39°50′39″N 089°40′41″W	
KSPK		Spanish Fork Municipal Airport Woodhouse Field	Spanish Fork	Utah	40°08′31″N 111°39′48″W	
KSPS	SPS	Wichita Falls Regional Airport / Sheppard Air Force Base	Wichita Falls	Texas	33°59′20″N 098°29′31″W	
KSPW	SPW	Spencer Municipal Airport (Northwest Iowa Regional Airport)	Spencer	Iowa	43°09′56″N 095°12′10″W	
KSPX		Houston Gulf Airport	League City	Texas	29°30′30″N 095°03′05″W	Closed 2002
KSPZ		Silver Springs Airport	Silver Springs	Nevada	39°24′11″N 119°15′04″W	
KSQI	SQI	Whiteside County Airport	Rock Falls	Illinois	41°44′25″N 089°40′51″W	
KSQL	SQL	San Carlos Airport	San Carlos	California	37°30′43″N 122°14′58″W	
KSRB		Upper Cumberland Regional Airport	Cookeville	Tennessee	36°03′21″N 085°31′51″W	
KSRC		Searcy Municipal Airport	Searcy	Arkansas	35°12′38″N 091°44′15″W	
KSRE		Seminole Municipal Airport	Seminole	Oklahoma	35°16′29″N 096°40′31″W	
KSRQ	SRQ	Sarasota-Bradenton International Airport	Sarasota	Florida	27°23′44″N 082°33′16″W	
KSRR	RUI	Sierra Blanca Regional Airport	Ruidoso	New Mexico	33°27′46″N 105°32′05″W	
KSSC		Shaw Air Force Base	Sumter	South Carolina	33°58′23″N 080°28′22″W	
KSSF	SSF	Stinson Municipal Airport	San Antonio	Texas	29°20′13″N 098°28′16″W	
KSSI	SSI	McKinnon St. Simons Island Airport	Brunswick	Georgia	31°09′07″N 081°23′29″W	
KSSN		Seneca Army Airfield	Romulus	New York	42°42′55″N 076°52′56″W	Closed
KSSQ		Shell Lake Municipal Airport	Shell Lake	Wisconsin	45°43′53″N 091°55′14″W	
KSTC		St. Cloud Regional Airport	St. Cloud	Minnesota	45°32′48″N 094°03′36″W	
KSTE	STE	Stevens Point Municipal Airport	Stevens Point	Wisconsin	44°32′42″N 089°31′49″W	
KSTF		George M. Bryan Airport	Starkville	Mississippi	33°25′59″N 088°50′55″W	
KSTJ	STJ	Rosecrans Memorial Airport	St. Joseph	Missouri	39°46′19″N 094°54′35″W	
KSTK		Sterling Municipal Airport	Sterling	Colorado	40°36′51″N 103°15′51″W	
KSTL	STL	St. Louis Lambert International Airport	St. Louis	Missouri	38°44′50″N 090°21′41″W	
KSTP	STP	St. Paul Downtown Airport (Holman Field)	St. Paul	Minnesota	44°56′04″N 093°03′36″W	
KSTS	STS	Charles M. Schulz-Sonoma County Airport	Santa Rosa	California	38°30′32″N 122°48′46″W	
KSUA		Witham Field	Stuart	Florida	27°10′54″N 080°13′16″W	
KSUD	SUD	Stroud Municipal Airport	Stroud	Oklahoma	35°47′22″N 096°39′20″W	
KSUE	SUE	Door County Cherryland Airport	Sturgeon Bay	Wisconsin	44°50′37″N 087°25′18″W	
KSUN	SUN	Friedman Memorial Airport	Hailey	Idaho	43°30′14″N 114°17′44″W	
KSUO		Rosebud Sioux Tribal Airport	Rosebud	South Dakota	43°15′30″N 100°51′34″W	
KSUS		Spirit of St. Louis Airport	St. Louis	Missouri	38°39′44″N 090°39′07″W	
KSUT		Cape Fear Regional Jetport (Howie Franklin Field)	Oak Island	North Carolina	33°55′51″N 078°04′24″W	
KSUU		Travis Air Force Base	Fairfield	California	38°15′46″N 121°55′39″W	
KSUW		Richard I. Bong Airport	Superior	Wisconsin	46°41′23″N 092°05′41″W	
KSUX	SUX	Sioux Gateway Airport	Sioux City	Iowa	42°24′09″N 096°23′04″W	
KSUZ		Saline County Regional Airport	Benton	Arkansas	34°35′25″N 092°28′46″W	
KSVC	SVC	Grant County Airport	Silver City	New Mexico	32°38′12″N 108°09′23″W	
KSVE		Susanville Municipal Airport	Susanville	California	40°22′32″N 120°34′22″W	
KSVH		Statesville Regional Airport	Statesville	North Carolina	35°45′54″N 080°57′14″W	
KSVN	SVN	Hunter Army Airfield	Savannah	Georgia	32°00′36″N 081°08′44″W	
KSVR		South Valley Regional Airport	West Jordan	Utah	40°37′10″N 111°59′34″W	
KSWF	SWF	Stewart International Airport	New Windsor	New York	41°30′15″N 074°06′17″W	
KSWI		Sherman Municipal Airport	Sherman	Texas	33°37′27″N 096°35′10″W	
KSWO	SWO	Stillwater Regional Airport	Stillwater	Oklahoma	36°09′41″N 097°05′09″W	
KSWT		Seward Municipal Airport	Seward	Nebraska	40°51′53″N 097°06′33″W	
KSWW	SWW	Avenger Field	Sweetwater	Texas	32°28′02″N 100°27′59″W	
KSXK		Sioux County Regional Airport	Maurice	Iowa	42°59′09″N 096°09′41″W	
KSXL		Summersville Airport	Summersville	West Virginia	38°13′54″N 080°52′15″W	
KSXS		Shell Army Heliport	Fort Rucker	Alabama	31°21′46″N 085°50′58″W	
KSXU		Santa Rosa Route 66 Airport	Santa Rosa	New Mexico	34°56′08″N 104°38′33″W	
KSYF		Cheyenne County Municipal Airport	St. Francis	Kansas	39°45′40″N 101°47′45″W	
KSYI		Shelbyville Municipal Airport (Bomar Field)	Shelbyville	Tennessee	35°33′34″N 086°26′33″W	
KSYL		Roberts Army Heliport	Camp Roberts, San Luis Obispo County	California	35°48′54″N 120°44′38″W	
KSYM		Morehead-Rowan County Clyde A. Thomas Regional Airport	Morehead	Kentucky	38°12′54″N 083°35′15″W	
KSYN	SYN	Stanton Airfield	Stanton	Minnesota	44°28′32″N 093°00′59″W	
KSYR	SYR	Syracuse Hancock International Airport	Syracuse	New York	43°06′40″N 076°06′23″W	
KSYV	SYV	Sylvester Airport	Sylvester	Georgia	31°33′25″N 083°53′38″W	
KSZL		Whiteman Air Force Base	Johnson County	Missouri	38°43′49″N 093°32′55″W	
KSZN	SZN	Santa Cruz Island Airport	Santa Cruz Island	California	34°03′38″N 119°54′54″W	Closed
KSZP		Santa Paula Airport	Santa Paula	California	34°20′49″N 119°03′42″W	
KSZT		Sandpoint Airport (Dave Wall Field)	Sandpoint	Idaho	48°17′58″N 116°33′36″W	
KSZY		Robert Sibley Airport	Selmer	Tennessee	35°12′10″N 088°29′54″W	

== KT ==
ICAO	IATA	Airport name	Community	State	Coordinates	Notes
KTAD		Perry Stokes Airport	Trinidad	Colorado	37°15′34″N 104°20′26″W	
KTAN		Taunton Municipal Airport	Taunton	Massachusetts	41°52′27″N 071°00′59″W	
KTAZ		Taylorville Municipal Airport	Taylorville	Illinois	39°31′57″N 089°19′39″W	
KTBN	TBN	Waynesville-St. Robert Regional Airport	Fort Leonard Wood	Missouri	37°44′30″N 092°08′27″W	
KTBR	TBR	Statesboro–Bulloch County Airport	Statesboro	Georgia	32°28′58″N 081°44′13″W	
KTBX		Shoshoni Municipal Airport	Shoshoni	Wyoming	43°15′05″N 108°07′16″W	
KTCC		Tucumcari Municipal Airport	Tucumcari	New Mexico	35°10′58″N 103°36′11″W	
KTCL	TCL	Tuscaloosa Regional Airport	Tuscaloosa	Alabama	33°13′14″N 087°36′41″W	
KTCM		McChord Air Force Base	Tacoma	Washington	47°08′51″N 122°28′46″W	
KTCS		Truth or Consequences Municipal Airport	Truth or Consequences	New Mexico	33°14′13″N 107°16′18″W	
KTCY		Tracy Municipal Airport	Tracy	California	37°41′20″N 121°26′30″W	
KTDF		Person County Airport	Roxboro	North Carolina	36°17′05″N 078°59′05″W	
KTDO		Toledo-Winston Carlock Memorial Airport	Toledo	Washington	46°28′38″N 122°48′23″W	
KTDW		Tradewind Airport	Amarillo	Texas	35°10′12″N 101°49′33″W	
KTDZ	TDZ	Toledo Executive Airport	Toledo	Ohio	41°33′53″N 083°28′56″W	
KTEB	TEB	Teterboro Airport	Teterboro	New Jersey	40°51′00″N 074°03′39″W	
KTEL		Perry County Municipal Airport	Tell City	Indiana	38°01′04″N 086°41′27″W	
KTEW		Mason Jewett Field	Mason	Michigan	42°33′57″N 084°25′24″W	
KTEX	TEX	Telluride Regional Airport	Telluride	Colorado	37°57′14″N 107°54′31″W	
KTFP		McCampbell–Porter Airport	Aransas Pass	Texas	27°54′47″N 097°12′41″W	
KTGC		Gibson County Airport	Trenton	Tennessee	35°55′57″N 088°50′56″W	
KTGI		Tangier Island Airport	Tangier	Virginia	37°49′33″N 075°59′52″W	
KTHA	THA	Tullahoma Regional Airport	Tullahoma	Tennessee	35°22′48″N 086°14′48″W	
KTHM		Thompson Falls Airport	Thompson Falls	Montana	47°34′25″N 115°16′50″W	
KTHP		Hot Springs County Municipal Airport	Thermopolis	Wyoming	43°39′30″N 108°12′47″W	
KTHV	THV	York Airport	York	Pennsylvania	39°55′01″N 076°52′23″W	
KTIF		Thomas County Airport	Thedford	Nebraska	41°57′46″N 100°34′13″W	
KTIK		Tinker Air Force Base	Oklahoma City	Oklahoma	35°24′53″N 097°23′12″W	
KTIP		Rantoul National Aviation Center	Rantoul	Illinois	40°17′37″N 088°08′33″W	
KTIW	TIW	Tacoma Narrows Airport	Tacoma	Washington	47°16′05″N 122°34′41″W	
KTIX	TIX	Space Coast Regional Airport	Titusville	Florida	28°30′53″N 080°47′57″W	
KTKC		Tracy Municipal Airport	Tracy	Minnesota	44°14′57″N 095°36′26″W	
KTKI	DTX	McKinney National Airport	McKinney	Texas	33°10′41″N 096°35′26″W	
KTKO		Mankato Airport	Mankato	Kansas	39°48′17″N 098°13′14″W	
KTKV	TKV	Tomahawk Regional Airport	Tomahawk	Wisconsin	45°28′10″N 089°48′18″W	
KTKX	KNT	Kennett Memorial Airport	Kennett	Missouri	36°13′33″N 090°02′12″W	
KTLH	TLH	Tallahassee International Airport	Tallahassee	Florida	30°23′48″N 084°21′01″W	
KTLR	TLR	Mefford Airport	Tulare	California	36°09′24″N 119°19′36″W	
KTMA	TMA	Henry Tift Myers Airport	Tifton	Georgia	31°25′44″N 083°29′19″W	
KTMB	TMB	Kendall-Tamiami Executive Airport	Miami	Florida	25°38′52″N 080°25′58″W	
KTME		Houston Executive Airport	Waller County	Texas	29°48′18″N 095°53′52″W	
KTMK	OTK	Tillamook Airport	Tillamook	Oregon	45°25′06″N 123°48′52″W	
KTMT	ASQ	Austin Airport	Austin	Nevada	39°28′05″N 117°11′51″W	
KTNP	TNP	Twentynine Palms Airport	Twentynine Palms	California	34°07′54″N 115°56′45″W	
KTNT	TNT	Dade-Collier Training and Transition Airport	Miami	Florida	25°51′42″N 080°53′49″W	
KTNU		Newton Municipal Airport	Newton	Iowa	41°40′28″N 093°01′18″W	
KTNX	XSD	Tonopah Test Range Airport	Tonopah	Nevada	37°47′41″N 116°46′43″W	
KTOA	TOA	Zamperini Field	Torrance	California	33°48′12″N 118°20′23″W	
KTOB		Dodge Center Airport	Dodge Center	Minnesota	44°01′05″N 092°50′04″W	
KTOC	TOC	Toccoa Airport	Toccoa	Georgia	34°35′34″N 083°17′47″W	
KTOI	TOI	Troy Municipal Airport	Troy	Alabama	31°51′38″N 086°00′44″W	
KTOL	TOL	Toledo Express Airport	Toledo	Ohio	41°35′15″N 083°48′45″W	
KTOP		Billard Municipal Airport	Topeka	Kansas	39°04′07″N 095°37′21″W	
KTOR		Torrington Municipal Airport	Torrington	Wyoming	42°03′52″N 104°09′10″W	
KTPA	TPA	Tampa International Airport	Tampa	Florida	27°58′47″N 082°32′05″W	
KTPF	TPF	Peter O. Knight Airport	Davis Island, Tampa	Florida	27°54′56″N 082°26′57″W	
KTPH		Tonopah Airport	Tonopah	Nevada	38°03′37″N 117°05′12″W	
KTPL	TPL	Draughon-Miller Central Texas Regional Airport	Temple	Texas	31°09′07″N 097°24′28″W	
KTQE		Tekamah Airport	Tekamah	Nebraska	41°45′49″N 096°10′40″W	
KTQH		Tahlequah Municipal Airport	Tahlequah	Oklahoma	35°55′49″N 095°00′16″W	
KTQK		Scott City Municipal Airport	Scott City	Kansas	38°28′27″N 100°53′06″W	
KTRI	TRI	Tri-Cities Regional Airport	Blountville	Tennessee	36°28′31″N 082°24′27″W	
KTRK	TKF	Truckee Tahoe Airport	Truckee	California	39°19′12″N 120°08′22″W	
KTRL	TRL	Terrell Municipal Airport	Terrell	Texas	32°42′33″N 096°16′03″W	
KTRM	TRM	Jacqueline Cochran Regional Airport	Thermal	California	33°37′36″N 116°09′35″W	
KTRX		Trenton Municipal Airport	Trenton	Missouri	40°05′01″N 093°35′26″W	
KTSO		Carroll County–Tolson Airport	Carrollton	Ohio	40°33′43″N 081°04′39″W	
KTSP		Tehachapi Municipal Airport	Tehachapi	California	35°08′06″N 118°26′21″W	
KTTA	TTA	Raleigh Executive Jetport	Sanford	North Carolina	35°34′57″N 079°06′05″W	
KTTD	TTD	Portland-Troutdale Airport	Portland	Oregon	45°32′58″N 122°24′04″W	
KTTF		Custer Airport	Monroe	Michigan	41°55′59″N 083°26′10″W	
KTTN	TTN	Trenton-Mercer Airport	Trenton	New Jersey	40°16′36″N 074°48′48″W	
KTTS	TTS	Shuttle Landing Facility	Merritt Island	Florida	28°36′54″N 080°41′40″W	
KTUL	TUL	Tulsa International Airport	Tulsa	Oklahoma	36°11′54″N 095°53′17″W	
KTUP	TUP	Tupelo Regional Airport	Tupelo	Mississippi	34°16′05″N 088°46′12″W	
KTUS	TUS	Tucson International Airport	Tucson	Arizona	32°06′58″N 110°56′28″W	
KTVB		Cabool Memorial Airport	Cabool	Missouri	37°07′57″N 092°05′02″W	
KTVC	TVC	Cherry Capital Airport	Traverse City	Michigan	44°44′30″N 085°34′56″W	
KTVF	TVF	Thief River Falls Regional Airport	Thief River Falls	Minnesota	48°03′56″N 096°11′06″W	
KTVI	TVI	Thomasville Regional Airport	Thomasville	Georgia	30°54′06″N 083°52′52″W	
KTVK		Centerville Municipal Airport	Centerville	Iowa	40°41′04″N 092°54′04″W	
KTVL		Lake Tahoe Airport	South Lake Tahoe	California	38°53′38″N 119°59′43″W	
KTVR	TVR	Vicksburg – Tallulah Regional Airport	Tallulah	Louisiana	32°21′06″N 091°01′40″W	
KTVY		Tooele Valley Airport (Bolinder Field)	Tooele	Utah	40°36′45″N 112°21′03″W	
KTVZ		Tompkinsville Monroe County Airport	Tompkinsville	Kentucky	36°43′44″N 085°39′09″W	
KTWF	TWF	Magic Valley Regional Airport (Joslin Field)	Twin Falls	Idaho	42°28′54″N 114°29′16″W	
KTWM		Richard B. Helgeson Airport	Two Harbors	Minnesota	47°02′56″N 091°44′42″W	
KTWT		Sturgis Municipal Airport	Sturgis	Kentucky	37°32′30″N 087°57′16″W	
KTXK	TXK	Texarkana Regional Airport (Webb Field)	Texarkana	Arkansas	33°27′13″N 093°59′28″W	
KTXW		Mid Valley Airport	Weslaco	Texas	26°10′40″N 097°58′22″W	
KTYL	TYZ	Taylor Airport	Taylor	Arizona	34°27′10″N 110°06′53″W	
KTYQ		Indianapolis Executive Airport	Indianapolis	Indiana	40°01′50″N 086°15′05″W	
KTYR	TYR	Tyler Pounds Regional Airport	Tyler	Texas	32°21′14″N 095°24′10″W	
KTYS	TYS	McGhee Tyson Airport	Knoxville	Tennessee	35°48′40″N 083°59′38″W	
KTZR		Bolton Field	Columbus	Ohio	39°54′04″N 083°08′13″W	
KTZT		Belle Plaine Municipal Airport	Belle Plaine	Iowa	41°52′44″N 092°17′05″W	
KTZV		Tompkinsville-Monroe County Airport	Tompkinsville	Kentucky	36°43′44″N 085°39′09″W	
KUAO		Aurora State Airport	Aurora	Oregon	45°14′50″N 122°46′12″W	
KUBE		Cumberland Municipal Airport	Cumberland	Wisconsin	45°30′22″N 091°58′51″W	
KUBS		Columbus-Lowndes County Airport	Columbus	Mississippi	33°27′55″N 088°22′49″W	
KUBX		Cuba Municipal Airport	Cuba	Missouri	38°04′08″N 091°25′44″W	

== KU ==
ICAO	IATA	Airport name	Community	State	Coordinates	Notes
KUCA		Oneida County Airport	Utica	New York	43°08′36″N 075°22′48″W	Closed
KUCC		Yucca Airstrip	Mercury	Nevada	36°56′45″N 116°02′16″W	
KUCP		New Castle Municipal Airport	New Castle	Pennsylvania	41°01′31″N 080°24′48″W	
KUCY	UCY	Everett–Stewart Regional Airport	Union City	Tennessee	36°22′47″N 088°59′09″W	
KUDD		Bermuda Dunes Airport	Palm Springs	California	33°44′54″N 116°16′29″W	
KUDG		Darlington County Jetport	Darlington	South Carolina	34°26′58″N 079°53′24″W	
KUES		Waukesha County Airport (Crites Field)	Waukesha	Wisconsin	43°02′28″N 088°14′13″W	
KUGN		Waukegan National Airport	Waukegan	Illinois	42°25′20″N 087°52′04″W	
KUIL		Quillayute Airport	Forks	Washington	47°56′12″N 124°33′45″W	
KUIN		Quincy Regional Airport	Quincy	Illinois	39°56′34″N 091°11′41″W	
KUIZ	UIZ	Berz-Macomb Airport	Utica	Michigan	42°39′50″N 082°57′56″W	Closed
KUKF		Wilkes County Airport	North Wilkesboro	North Carolina	36°13′22″N 081°05′54″W	
KUKI		Ukiah Municipal Airport	Ukiah	California	39°07′33″N 123°12′03″W	
KUKL		Coffey County Airport	Burlington	Kansas	38°18′09″N 095°43′30″W	
KUKT		Quakertown Airport	Quakertown	Pennsylvania	40°26′11″N 075°22′49″W	
KULM	ULM	New Ulm Municipal Airport	New Ulm	Minnesota	44°19′10″N 094°30′08″W	
KULS		Ulysses Airport	Ulysses	Kansas	37°36′14″N 101°22′26″W	
KUMP		Indianapolis Metropolitan Airport	Fishers	Indiana	39°56′07″N 086°02′42″W	
KUNI	ATO	Gordon K. Bush Airport	Athens / Albany	Ohio	39°12′43″N 082°13′45″W	
KUNO		West Plains Regional Airport	West Plains	Missouri	36°52′42″N 091°54′10″W	
KUNU	UNU	Dodge County Airport	Juneau	Wisconsin	43°25′35″N 088°42′14″W	
KUNV	SCE	State College Regional Airport	Benner Township	Pennsylvania	40°50′57″N 077°50′55″W	
KUOS	UOS	Franklin County Airport	Sewanee	Tennessee	35°12′19″N 085°53′53″W	
KUOX	UOX	University-Oxford Airport	Oxford	Mississippi	34°23′04″N 089°32′12″W	
KUSE		Fulton County Airport	Wauseon	Ohio	41°36′36″N 084°07′38″W	
KUSW		Boggs Field	Spencer	West Virginia	38°49′26″N 081°20′56″W	
KUTA	UTM	Tunica Municipal Airport	Tunica	Mississippi	34°41′06″N 090°20′52″W	
KUTS	HTV	Huntsville Municipal Airport	Huntsville	Texas	30°44′49″N 095°35′14″W	
KUUU		Newport State Airport	Newport	Rhode Island	41°31′57″N 071°16′54″W	
KUUV		Sullivan Regional Airport	Sullivan	Missouri	38°14′00″N 091°09′51″W	
KUVA	UVA	Garner Field	Uvalde	Texas	29°12′41″N 099°44′37″W	
KUWL		New Castle-Henry County Municipal Airport	New Castle	Indiana	39°52′33″N 085°19′35″W	
KUXL		Southland Field	Sulphur	Louisiana	30°07′53″N 093°22′34″W	
KUYF		Madison County Airport	London	Ohio	39°55′58″N 083°27′43″W	
KUZA		Rock Hill/York County Airport (Bryant Field)	Rock Hill	South Carolina	34°59′16″N 081°03′26″W	

== KV ==
ICAO	IATA	Airport name	Community	State	Coordinates	Notes
KVAD	VAD	Moody Air Force Base	Valdosta	Georgia	30°58′07″N 083°11′35″W	
KVAY		South Jersey Regional Airport	Mount Holly	New Jersey	39°56′34″N 074°50′45″W	
KVBG		Vandenberg Space Force Base	Lompoc	California	34°45′05″N 120°31′13″W	
KVBT		Bentonville Municipal Airport	Bentonville	Arkansas	36°20′45″N 094°13′10″W	
KVBW		Bridgewater Airport	Bridgewater	Virginia	38°22′00″N 078°57′37″W	
KVCB		Nut Tree Airport	Vacaville	California	38°22′40″N 121°57′42″W	
KVCT	VCT	Victoria Regional Airport	Victoria	Texas	28°51′09″N 096°55′07″W	
KVCV	VCV	Southern California Logistics Airport	Victorville	California	34°35′51″N 117°22′59″W	
KVDF		Tampa Executive Airport	Tampa	Florida	28°00′50″N 082°20′43″W	
KVDI	VDI	Vidalia Regional Airport	Vidalia	Georgia	32°11′34″N 082°22′16″W	
KVEL	VEL	Vernal Regional Airport	Vernal	Utah	40°26′27″N 109°30′36″W	
KVER		Jesse Viertel Memorial Airport	Boonville	Missouri	38°56′48″N 092°40′58″W	
KVES		Darke County Airport	Versailles	Ohio	40°12′16″N 084°31′55″W	
KVGC		Hamilton Municipal Airport	Hamilton	New York	42°50′36″N 075°33′40″W	
KVGT	VGT	North Las Vegas Airport	Las Vegas	Nevada	36°12′38″N 115°11′40″W	
KVHN	VHN	Culberson County Airport	Van Horn	Texas	31°03′28″N 104°47′02″W	
KVIH	VIH	Rolla National Airport	Rolla / Vichy	Missouri	38°07′39″N 091°46′10″W	
KVIQ		Neillsville Municipal Airport	Neillsville	Wisconsin	44°33′29″N 090°30′44″W	
KVIS	VIS	Visalia Municipal Airport	Visalia	California	36°19′07″N 119°23′34″W	
KVJI		Virginia Highlands Airport	Abingdon	Virginia	36°41′14″N 082°01′59″W	
KVKS		Vicksburg Municipal Airport	Vicksburg	Mississippi	32°14′21″N 090°55′42″W	
KVKX		Potomac Airfield	Friendly	Maryland	38°44′55″N 076°57′21″W	
KVLA	VLA	Vandalia Municipal Airport	Vandalia	Illinois	38°59′28″N 089°10′02″W	
KVLD	VLD	Valdosta Regional Airport	Valdosta	Georgia	30°46′53″N 083°16′34″W	
KVLL		Oakland-Troy Airport	Troy	Michigan	42°32′35″N 083°10′40″W	
KVMR		Davidson Airport	Vermillion	South Dakota	42°45′55″N 096°56′03″W	
KVNC	VNC	Venice Municipal Airport	Venice	Florida	27°04′18″N 082°26′25″W	
KVNW		Van Wert County Airport	Van Wert	Ohio	40°51′53″N 084°36′35″W	
KVNY	VNY	Van Nuys Airport	Van Nuys	California	34°12′35″N 118°29′24″W	
KVOK	VOK	Volk Field Air National Guard Base	Camp Douglas	Wisconsin	43°56′20″N 090°15′12″W	
KVPC		Cartersville Airport	Cartersville	Georgia	34°07′23″N 084°50′55″W	
KVPS	VPS	Destin-Fort Walton Beach Airport / Eglin Air Force Base	Valparaiso	Florida	30°29′00″N 086°31′31″W	
KVPZ		Porter County Regional Airport	Valparaiso	Indiana	41°27′14″N 087°00′26″W	
KVQQ	VQQ	Cecil Airport	Jacksonville	Florida	30°13′07″N 081°52′36″W	
KVRB	VRB	Vero Beach Regional Airport	Vero Beach	Florida	27°39′20″N 080°25′05″W	
KVSF	VSF	Hartness State Airport	Springfield	Vermont	43°20′37″N 072°31′02″W	
KVTA		Newark-Heath Airport	Newark	Ohio	40°01′29″N 082°27′43″W	
KVTI		Vinton Veterans Memorial Airpark	Vinton	Iowa	42°13′06″N 092°01′33″W	
KVTN		Miller Field	Valentine	Nebraska	42°51′24″N 100°32′56″W	
KVUJ		Stanly County Airport	Albemarle	North Carolina	35°25′00″N 080°09′03″W	
KVUO		Pearson Field	Vancouver	Washington	45°37′14″N 122°39′23″W	
KVVS		Joseph A. Hardy Connellsville Airport	Connellsville	Pennsylvania	39°57′33″N 079°39′26″W	
KVVV		Ortonville Municipal Airport (Martinson Field)	Ortonville	Minnesota	45°18′21″N 096°25′28″W	
KVWU		Waskish Municipal Airport	Waskish	Minnesota	48°09′15″N 094°31′01″W	
KVYS		Illinois Valley Regional Airport (Walter A. Duncan Field)	Peru	Illinois	41°21′07″N 089°09′11″W	

== KW ==
ICAO	IATA	Airport name	Community	State	Coordinates	Notes
KWAL		Wallops Flight Facility	Wallops Island	Virginia	37°56′00″N 075°28′04″W	
KWAY		Greene County Airport	Waynesburg	Pennsylvania	39°54′04″N 080°07′50″W	
KWBW	WBW	Wilkes-Barre Wyoming Valley Airport	Wilkes-Barre	Pennsylvania	41°17′50″N 075°51′08″W	
KWDG	WDG	Woodring Airport	Enid	Oklahoma	36°22′42″N 097°47′20″W	
KWDR	WDR	Barrow County Airport	Winder	Georgia	33°58′58″N 083°40′03″W	
KWEA	WEA	Parker County Airport	Weatherford	Texas	32°44′47″N 097°40′57″W	
KWHP		Whiteman Airport	Los Angeles	California	34°15′34″N 118°24′48″W	
KWJF	WJF	General William J. Fox Airfield	Lancaster	California	34°44′28″N 118°13′07″W	
KWLD	WLD	Strother Field	Winfield	Kansas	37°10′07″N 097°02′15″W	
KWLW	WLW	Willows-Glenn County Airport	Willows	California	39°30′57″N 122°13′02″W	
KWMC	WMC	Winnemucca Municipal Airport	Winnemucca	Nevada	40°53′48″N 117°48′21″W	
KWRB		Robins Air Force Base	Warner Robins	Georgia	32°38′24″N 083°35′30″W	
KWRI		McGuire Air Force Base	Wrightstown	New Jersey	40°00′56″N 074°35′30″W	
KWRL		Worland Municipal Airport	Worland	Wyoming	43°57′46″N 107°57′02″W	
KWSD	WSD	Condron Army Airfield	White Sands	New Mexico	32°20′29″N 106°24′10″W	Closed
KWST	WST	Westerly State Airport	Westerly	Rhode Island	41°20′59″N 071°48′12″W	
KWVI	WVI	Watsonville Municipal Airport	Watsonville	California	36°56′09″N 121°47′23″W	
KWVL		Waterville Robert LaFleur Airport	Waterville	Maine	44°32′00″N 069°40′32″W	
KWWD		Cape May Airport	Wildwood	New Jersey	39°00′31″N 074°54′31″W	
KWWR	WWR	West Woodward Airport	Woodward	Oklahoma	36°26′17″N 099°31′22″W	
KWYS	WYS	Yellowstone Airport	West Yellowstone	Montana	44°41′18″N 111°07′04″W	

== KX ==
ICAO	IATA	Airport name	Community	State	Coordinates	Notes
KXBP		Bridgeport Municipal Airport	Bridgeport	Texas	33°10′31″N 097°49′42″W	
KXFL		Flagler County Airport	Bunnell	Florida	29°28′03″N 081°12′23″W	
KXLL		Allentown Queen City Municipal Airport	Allentown	Pennsylvania	40°34′13″N 075°29′18″W	
KXMR		Cape Canaveral Space Force Station	Cocoa Beach	Florida	28°29′20″N 080°34′40″W	
KXNA	XNA	Northwest Arkansas Regional Airport	Highfill	Arkansas	36°16′54″N 094°18′28″W	
KXNI		Andrew Othole Memorial Airport	Zuni	New Mexico	35°03′38″N 108°56′15″W	
KXNO		North Air Force Auxiliary Field	North	South Carolina	33°37′01″N 081°04′59″W	
KXNX		Sumner County Regional Airport	Gallatin	Tennessee	36°22′36″N 086°24′31″W	
KXSA		Tappahannock–Essex County Airport	Tappahannock	Virginia	37°51′35″N 076°53′39″W	
KXTA	XTA	Homey Airport	Groom Lake	Nevada	37°14′00″N 115°48′30″W	
KXVG		Longville Municipal Airport	Longville	Minnesota	46°59′25″N 094°12′14″W	
KXWA	XWA	Williston Basin International Airport	Williston	North Dakota	48°15′35″N 103°45′02″W	

== KY ==
ICAO	IATA	Airport name	Community	State	Coordinates	Notes
KYIP	YIP	Willow Run Airport	Ypsilanti	Michigan	42°14′17″N 083°31′49″W	
KYKM	YKM	Yakima Air Terminal (McAllister Field)	Yakima	Washington	46°34′05″N 120°32′39″W	
KYKN	YKN	Chan Gurney Municipal Airport	Yankton	South Dakota	42°55′00″N 097°23′09″W	
KYNG	YNG	Youngstown-Warren Regional Airport	Youngstown / Warren	Ohio	41°15′39″N 080°40′45″W	

== KZ ==
ICAO	IATA	Airport name	Community	State	Coordinates	Notes
KZEF		Elkin Municipal Airport	Elkin	North Carolina	36°16′48″N 080°47′10″W	
KZER		Schuylkill County Airport (Joe Zerbey Field)	Pottsville	Pennsylvania	40°42′23″N 076°22′23″W	
KZPH	ZPH	Zephyrhills Municipal Airport	Zephyrhills	Florida	28°13′41″N 082°09′21″W	
KZUN		Black Rock Airport	Zuni Pueblo	New Mexico	35°04′59″N 108°47′30″W	Closed 2018
KZZV	ZZV	Zanesville Municipal Airport	Zanesville	Ohio	39°56′40″N 081°53′32″W	
