= List of airports in Missouri =

This is a list of airports in Missouri (a U.S. state), grouped by type and sorted by location. It contains all public-use and military airports in the state. Some private-use and former airports may be included where notable, such as airports that were previously public-use, those with commercial enplanements recorded by the FAA or airports assigned an IATA airport code.

== Airports ==
This list contains the following information:

- **City served** – The city generally associated with the airport, as per the airport's master record with the Federal Aviation Administration. This is not always the actual location since some airports are located in smaller towns outside of the city they serve. It is not meant to be a complete list of cities served, which can be found in or added to each airport's Wikipedia article.
- **FAA** – The location identifier assigned by the Federal Aviation Administration (FAA). These are linked to each airport's page at the Missouri Department of Transportation Airport Directory.
- **IATA** – The airport code assigned by the International Air Transport Association (IATA). Those that do not match the FAA code are shown in bold.
- **ICAO** – The location indicator assigned by the International Civil Aviation Organization (ICAO).
- **Airport name** – The official airport name. Those shown in **bold** indicate the airport has scheduled passenger service on commercial airlines.
- **Role** – One of four FAA airport categories, as per the 2021–2025 National Plan of Integrated Airport Systems (NPIAS) report released September 2020:
  - P-s: Commercial service – primary are publicly owned airports that receive scheduled passenger service and have more than 10,000 passenger boardings (enplanements) each year. Each primary airport is sub-classified by the FAA as one of the following four "hub" types (s):
    - L: Large hub that accounts for at least 1% of total U.S. passenger enplanements.
    - M: Medium hub that accounts for between 0.25% and 1% of total U.S. passenger enplanements.
    - S: Small hub that accounts for between 0.05% and 0.25% of total U.S. passenger enplanements.
    - N: Nonhub that accounts for less than 0.05% of total U.S. passenger enplanements, but more than 10,000 annual enplanements.
  - CS: Commercial service – nonprimary are publicly owned airports that receive scheduled passenger service and have at least 2,500 passenger boardings each year.
  - R: Reliever airports are designated by the FAA to relieve congestion at a large commercial service airport and to provide more general aviation access to the overall community.
  - GA: General aviation airports are the largest single group of airports in the U.S. airport system. They are public-use airports that do not have scheduled service or have scheduled service with less than 2,500 passenger boardings each year.
- **Enplanements** – The number of enplanements (commercial passenger boardings) that occurred at the airport in calendar year 2024, as per FAA records released October 2025.

City served	FAA	IATA	ICAO	Airport name	Role	Enplanements (2024)
				**Commercial service – primary airports**		
Branson	BBG	**BKG**	KBBG	Branson Airport	P-N	2,856
Columbia	COU	COU	KCOU	**Columbia Regional Airport**	P-N	103,081
Fort Leonard Wood / Waynesville	TBN	TBN	KTBN	**Waynesville–St. Robert Regional Airport** (Forney Field)	P-N	11,276
Joplin	JLN	JLN	KJLN	**Joplin Regional Airport**	P-N	18,362
Kansas City	MCI	MCI	KMCI	**Kansas City International Airport** (was Mid-Continent International)	P-M	5,915,078
St. Louis	STL	STL	KSTL	**St. Louis Lambert International Airport**	P-M	7,807,362
Springfield/Branson	SGF	SGF	KSGF	**Springfield–Branson National Airport**	P-S	702,338
				**Commercial service – nonprimary airports**		
Cape Girardeau	CGI	CGI	KCGI	**Cape Girardeau Regional Airport**	CS	9,493
Kirksville	IRK	IRK	KIRK	**Kirksville Regional Airport**	CS	5,611
				**Reliever airports**		
Kansas City	MKC	MKC	KMKC	Charles B. Wheeler Downtown Airport (Kansas City Downtown)	R	5,148
Lee's Summit	LXT		KLXT	Lee's Summit Municipal Airport	R	3
St. Charles	SET		KSET	St. Charles County Smartt Airport (Smartt Field)	R	0
St. Louis	1H0			Creve Coeur Airport	R	0
St. Louis	SUS	SUS	KSUS	Spirit of St. Louis Airport	R	119
				**General aviation airports**		
Aurora	2H2			Jerry Sumners Sr. Aurora Municipal Airport	GA	0
Bolivar	M17			Bolivar Municipal Airport	GA	0
Boonville	VER		KVER	Jesse Viertel Memorial Airport (Jesse P. Viertel)	GA	0
Bowling Green	H19			Bowling Green Municipal Airport	GA	0
Branson West	FWB		KFWB	Branson West Municipal Airport (Emerson Field)	GA	0
Brookfield	MO8			North Central Missouri Regional Airport	GA	3
Butler	BUM	BUM	KBUM	Butler Memorial Airport	GA	0
Cabool	TVB		KTVB	Cabool Memorial Airport	GA	0
Camdenton	OZS			Camdenton Memorial-Lake Regional Airport	GA	2
Cameron	EZZ		KEZZ	Cameron Memorial Airport	GA	0
Caruthersville	M05			Caruthersville Memorial Airport	GA	0
Cassville	94K			Cassville Municipal Airport	GA	0
Chillicothe	CHT		KCHT	Chillicothe Municipal Airport	GA	0
Clinton	GLY		KGLY	Clinton Regional Airport	GA	0
Cuba	UBX		KUBX	Cuba Municipal Airport	GA	0
Dexter	DXE		KDXE	Dexter Municipal Airport	GA	0
Eldon	H79			Eldon Model Airpark	GA	0
Farmington	FAM	FAM	KFAM	Farmington Regional Airport	GA	0
Fredericktown	H88			A. Paul Vance Fredericktown Regional Airport	GA	0
Fulton	FTT		KFTT	Elton Hensley Memorial Airport	GA	0
Hannibal	HAE		KHAE	Hannibal Regional Airport (was Hannibal Municipal)	GA	1
Harrisonville	LRY		KLRY	Lawrence Smith Memorial Airport	GA	0
Higginsville	HIG		KHIG	Higginsville Industrial Municipal Airport	GA	0
Houston	M48			Houston Memorial Airport	GA	0
Jefferson City	JEF	JEF	KJEF	Jefferson City Memorial Airport	GA	29
Kaiser / Lake Ozark	AIZ	AIZ	KAIZ	Lee C. Fine Memorial Airport	GA	0
Kennett	TKX	KNT	KTKX	Kennett Memorial Airport	GA	0
Lamar	LLU		KLLU	Lamar Municipal Airport	GA	0
Lebanon	LBO		KLBO	Floyd W. Jones Lebanon Airport	GA	0
Linn	1H3			State Technical College of Missouri Airport	GA	0
Macon	K89			Macon-Fower Memorial Airport	GA	0
Malden	MAW	MAW	KMAW	Malden Regional Airport (was Malden Municipal)	GA	0
Marshall	MHL	MHL	KMHL	Marshall Memorial Municipal Airport	GA	0
Maryville	EVU		KEVU	Northwest Missouri Regional Airport	GA	0
Memphis	03D			Memphis Memorial Airport	GA	0
Mexico	MYJ		KMYJ	Mexico Memorial Airport	GA	0
Moberly	MBY	MBY	KMBY	Omar N. Bradley Airport	GA	0
Monett	HFJ		KHFJ	Monett Municipal Airport	GA	0
Monticello	6M6			Lewis County Regional Airport	GA	0
Mosby	GPH		KGPH	Midwest National Air Center (was Clay County Regional)	GA	0
Mountain Grove	1MO			Mountain Grove Memorial Airport	GA	0
Mountain View	MNF		KMNF	Mountain View Airport	GA	0
Neosho	EOS	EOS	KEOS	Neosho Hugh Robinson Airport	GA	0
Nevada	NVD	NVD	KNVD	Nevada Municipal Airport	GA	0
New Madrid	EIW		KEIW	County Memorial Airport	GA	0
Osage Beach	K15	OSB		Grand Glaize-Osage Beach Airport	GA	0
Perryville	PCD		KPCD	Perryville Regional Airport	GA	0
Piedmont	PYN		KPYN	Piedmont Municipal Airport	GA	0
Poplar Bluff	POF	POF	KPOF	Poplar Bluff Regional Business Airport	GA	4
Potosi	8WC			Washington County Airport	GA	0
Rolla / Vichy	VIH	VIH	KVIH	Rolla National Airport	GA	0
St. Joseph	STJ	STJ	KSTJ	Rosecrans Memorial Airport	GA	134
Salem	K33			Salem Memorial Airport	GA	0
Sedalia	DMO	DMO	KDMO	Sedalia Regional Airport (was Sedalia Memorial)	GA	0
Sikeston	SIK	SIK	KSIK	Sikeston Memorial Municipal Airport	GA	0
Sullivan	UUV		KUUV	Sullivan Regional Airport	GA	0
Tarkio	K57			Gould Peterson Municipal Airport	GA	0
Trenton	TRX	TRX	KTRX	Trenton Municipal Airport	GA	0
Warrensburg	RCM		KRCM	Skyhaven Airport	GA	0
Warsaw	RAW		KRAW	Warsaw Municipal Airport	GA	0
Washington	FYG		KFYG	Washington Regional Airport (was Washington Memorial)	GA	39
West Plains	UNO		KUNO	West Plains Regional Airport (was West Plains Municipal)	GA	0
				**Other public-use airports** (not listed in NPIAS)		
Albany	K19			Albany Municipal Airport		
Ava	AOV		KAOV	Ava Bill Martin Memorial Airport		
Bates City	2M1			Harry S. Truman Regional Airport		
Bethany	75K			Bethany Memorial Airport		
Bismarck	H57			Bismarck Memorial Airport		
Branson / Point Lookout	PLK	PLK	KPLK	M. Graham Clark Downtown Airport (was Taney County Airport)		
Buffalo	H17			Buffalo Municipal Airport		
Campbell	34M			Campbell Municipal Airport		
Carrollton	K26			Carrollton Memorial Airport		
Charleston	CHQ		KCHQ	Mississippi County Airport		
Dearborn	0C1			Triple R Airport		
Doniphan	X33			Doniphan Municipal Airport		
El Dorado Springs	87K			El Dorado Springs Memorial Airport		
Excelsior Springs	3EX			Excelsior Springs Memorial Airport		
Festus	FES		KFES	Festus Memorial Airport		
Gainesville	H27			Gainesville Memorial Airport		
Gideon	M85			Gideon Memorial Airport		
Grain Valley	3GV			East Kansas City Airport		
Hayti	M28			Mid Continent Airport (Mid-Continent Airport)		
Hermann	63M			Hermann Municipal Airport		
Hornersville	37M			Hornersville Memorial Airport		
Kahoka	0H7			Kahoka Municipal Airport		
Liberty	0N0			Roosterville Airport		
Lincoln	0R2			Lincoln Municipal Airport		
Mansfield	03B			Mansfield Municipal Airport		
Maryville	78Y			Rankin Airport		
Monroe City	K52			Monroe City Airport (Capt. Ben Smith Airfield)		
Moscow Mills	M71			Greensfield Airport		
Mount Vernon	2MO			Mount Vernon Municipal Airport		
Osage Beach	19T			Tan-Tar-A Resort Seaplane Base		
Richland	MO1			Richland Municipal Airport		
Rolla	K07			Rolla Downtown Airport		
Seymour	H58			Owen Field		
Shelbyville	6K2			Shelby County Airport		
Springfield	3DW			Downtown Airport		
Springfield	MO2			Flying Bar H Ranch Airport		
Steele	M12			Steele Municipal Airport		
Stockton	MO3			Stockton Municipal Airport		
Stockton	2M5			Stockton Lake Seaplane Base		
Thayer	42M			Thayer Memorial Airport		
Unionville	K43			Unionville Municipal Airport (was Municipal Airport)		
Van Buren	MO5			Bollinger-Crass Memorial Airport		
Versailles	3VS	VRS		Roy Otten Memorial Airfield		
Warsaw	75U			Harry S. Truman Dam & Reservoir Seaplane Base		
Willow Springs	1H5			Willow Springs Memorial Airport		
				**Other military airports**		
Knob Noster	SZL	SZL	KSZL	Whiteman Air Force Base		525
				**Notable private-use airports**		
Gravois Mills	MO30			Harbour Airport (was public use 2005, FAA: 7L7)		
Lexington	MU97			Lexington Municipal Airport		
Montgomery City	4MO1			Wehrman Airport (was public use 2010, FAA: 4MO)		
Osceola	23MU			Sean D. Sheldon Memorial Airfield		
Plattsburg	51MO			Plattsburg Airpark		
Springfield	39MO			Gardner Airport		
				**Notable former airports**		
Bonne Terre	~~77K~~			Bonne Terre Memorial Airport (closed 1998-2000)		
Carthage	~~H20~~			Myers Park Memorial Municipal Airport (closed 1997)		
Columbia	~~CBI~~			Columbia Municipal Airport (closed 1970s)		
Columbia	~~K24~~			E.W. Cotton Woods Memorial Airport (closed 1990)		
Grandview	~~GVW~~			Richards-Gebaur Airport (closed 1999, former Air Force Base)		
Independence	~~3IP~~			Independence Memorial Airport (closed 2003?)		
Lake Winnebago	~~MO8~~			Lake Winnebago Municipal Airport (closed 1990s)		
Marble Hill	~~0T3~~			Twin City Airpark		
Ozark	~~2K2~~			Air Park South (closed 2006)		
Princeton	~~7MO~~			Princeton-Kauffman Memorial Airport (closed 2012?)		
St. Charles	~~3SQ~~			St. Charles Airport		
St. Louis	~~02K~~			Arrowhead Airport (closed 1993)		
St. Clair	~~K39~~			St. Clair Regional Airport (closed 2017)		
St. Louis	~~3WE~~			Weiss Airport (closed 1994)		
Slater	~~9K5~~			Slater Memorial Airport		

== See also ==
- Essential Air Service
- Missouri World War II Army Airfields
- Wikipedia:WikiProject Aviation/Airline destination lists: North America#Missouri
