= Smith Airport =

Smith Airport may refer to:

- Lawrence Smith Memorial Airport serving Harrisonville, Missouri, United States (FAA: LRY)
- Lubbock Preston Smith International Airport serving Lubbock, Texas, United States (FAA: LBB)
- Merle K. (Mudhole) Smith Airport serving Cordova, Alaska, United States (FAA: CDV)
- Michael J. Smith Field serving Beaufort, North Carolina, United States (FAA: MRH)
- Smith Field (Arkansas) serving Siloam Springs, Arkansas, United States (FAA: SLG)
- Smith Field (Indiana) serving Fort Wayne, Indiana, United States (FAA: SMD)

== See also ==
- Smith Field (disambiguation)
