= Downtown Airport =

Downtown Airport may refer to:

- Downtown Airport (Arkansas) in El Dorado, Arkansas, United States (FAA: F43)
- Downtown Airport (Missouri) in Springfield, Missouri, United States (FAA: 3DW)

== Similarly named airports ==
- Ardmore Downtown Executive Airport in Ardmore, Oklahoma, United States (FAA: 1F0)
- Charles B. Wheeler Downtown Airport in Kansas City, Missouri, United States (FAA: MKC)
- Columbia Owens Downtown Airport in Columbia, South Carolina, United States (FAA: CUB)
- Greenville Downtown Airport in Greenville, South Carolina, United States (FAA: GMU)
- Kickapoo Downtown Airport in Wichita Falls, Texas, United States (FAA: CWC)
- Knoxville Downtown Island Airport in Knoxville, Tennessee, United States (FAA: DKX)
- Macon Downtown Airport in Macon, Georgia, United States (FAA: MAC)
- Mobile Downtown Airport in Mobile, Alabama, United States (FAA: BFM)
- Rolla Downtown Airport in Rolla, Missouri, United States (FAA: K07)
- St. Paul Downtown Airport in St. Paul, Minnesota, United States (FAA: STP)
- St. Louis Downtown Airport in Cahokia, Illinois, United States (FAA: CPS)
- Shreveport Downtown Airport in Shreveport, Louisiana, United States (FAA: DTN)
- Spartanburg Downtown Memorial Airport in Spartanburg, South Carolina, United States (FAA: SPA)
- Wausau Downtown Airport in Wausau, Wisconsin, United States (FAA: AUW)
