= K33 =

K33 or K-33 may refer to:

- K-33 (Kansas highway)
- K-33 truck, an American military truck
- HSwMS Härnösand (K33), a corvette of the Swedish Navy
- Kissaviarsuk-33, a sports club from Greenland
- Kyrie in F major, K. 33, by Wolfgang Amadeus Mozart
- Potassium-33, an isotope of potassium
- Salem Memorial Airport, in Dent County, Missouri, United States
- Soviet submarine K-33
- K_{3,3}, the complete bipartite graph on 3 vertices
