= Skyhaven Airport =

Skyhaven Airport may refer to:

- Skyhaven Airport (New Hampshire) in Rochester, New Hampshire, United States (FAA: DAW)
- Skyhaven Airport (Missouri) in Warrensburg, Missouri, United States (FAA: RCM)
- Skyhaven Airport (Pennsylvania) in Tunkhannock, Pennsylvania, United States (FAA: 76N)
