= K43 =

K43 may refer to:

- K-43 (Kansas highway)
- K-43 truck, an American military truck
- INS Nishank (K43), a corvette of the Indian Navy
- Junkers K 43, a German transport aircraft
- Karabiner 43, a German rifle
- Potassium-43, an isotope of potassium
- Soviet submarine K-43
- Symphony No. 6 (Mozart), by Wolfgang Amadeus Mozart
- Unionville Municipal Airport, in Putnam County, Missouri
