= KSET =

KSET may refer to:

- KSET (student association), a student association at the University of Zagreb
- WFFC-LD, a low-power television station (channel 25, virtual 30) licensed to serve Midland, Michigan, United States, which held the call sign KSET-LD from 2017 to 2018
- KHTW, a radio station (1300 AM) licensed to serve Lumberton, Texas, United States, which held the call sign KSET from 2000 to 2016
- The ICAO code for St. Charles County Smartt Airport
