= K52 =

K52 or K-52 may refer to:

- K-52 (Kansas highway)
- K-52 trailer, an American military trailer
- HMS Puffin, a sloop of the Royal Navy
- Monroe City Regional Airport, in Monroe County, Missouri
- Potassium-52, an isotope of potassium
- Shin-Fuji Station (Hokkaido)
