= Warsaw Airport =

Warsaw Airport may refer to the following airports in Poland:

- Warsaw Chopin Airport (IATA: WAW, ICAO: EPWA), Poland's busiest airport, previously known as Warsaw-Okecie Airport
- Warsaw Modlin Airport (IATA: WMI, ICAO: EPMO), Warsaw's secondary airport, intended to be used by low-cost carriers
- Warsaw Radom Airport (IATA: RDO, ICAO: EPRA), located in Radom, located 100km south of Warsaw, with minimal usage
- Warsaw Babice Airport (ICAO: EPBC), also known as Bemowo, for civil, sports, and Interior Ministry use

== See also ==
- Warsaw Municipal Airport (disambiguation) for airports in the United States
