= Lamar Municipal Airport =

Lamar Municipal Airport may refer to:

- Lamar Municipal Airport (Colorado) in Lamar, Colorado, United States (FAA/IATA: LAA)
- Lamar Municipal Airport (Missouri) in Lamar, Missouri, United States (FAA: LLU)
