= Mountain View Airport =

Mountain View Airport may refer to:

- Mountain View Airport (Ontario), a military airport in Mountain View, Ontario, Canada (TC: CPZ3)
- Mountain View Airport (Arkansas), a public airport in Mountain View, Arkansas, United States (FAA: 7M2)
- Mountain View Airport (Missouri), a public airport in Mountain View, Missouri, United States (FAA: MNF)
- Moffett Federal Airfield, a joint civil-military use airfield near Mountain View, California, United States
