= Washington County Airport =

Washington County Airport may refer to:

- Washington County Airport (Missouri) in Washington County, Missouri, United States (FAA: 8WC)
- Washington County Airport (Pennsylvania) in Washington County, Pennsylvania, United States (FAA: AFJ, IATA: WSG)
- Washington County Memorial Airport in Washington County, Kansas, United States (FAA: K38)
