= Richland Airport =

Richland Airport may refer to:

- Richland Airport (Washington) in Richland, Washington, United States (FAA: RLD)
- Richland Airport (Wisconsin) in Richland Center, Wisconsin, United States (FAA: 93C)
- Richland Municipal Airport in Richland, Missouri, United States (FAA: MO1)
- Sidney-Richland Municipal Airport in Sidney, Montana, United States (FAA: SDY)
- Tri-Cities Airport (Washington) is the commercial airport that serves Richland, Washington (One of the Tri-Cities).
