= Smith Field =

Smith Field may refer to:

- Smith Field (Arkansas), an airport serving Siloam Springs, Arkansas, United States (FAA: SLG)
- Smith Field (Indiana), an airport serving Fort Wayne, Indiana, United States (FAA: SMD)
- Smith Field (Loyola Marymount), softball stadium at Loyola Marymount University
- Michael J. Smith Field, an airport serving Beaufort, North Carolina, United States (FAA: MRH)
