= Sedalia Regional Airport =

- IATA: DMO; ICAO: KDMO; FAA LID: DMO

Summary
- Airport type: Public
- Owner: City of Sedalia
- Serves: Sedalia, Missouri
- Elevation AMSL: 910 ft / 277 m
- Coordinates: 38°42′27″N 093°10′33″W
- Website: CityOfSedalia.com/...

Map

Runways
Direction	Length		Surface
Direction	ft	m	Surface
18/36	5,500	1,676	Concrete
5/23	3,519	1,073	Asphalt

Statistics (2009)
- Aircraft operations: 9,692
- Based aircraft: 18
- Source: Federal Aviation Administration

Sedalia Regional Airport (IATA: DMO, ICAO: KDMO, FAA LID: DMO) is two miles east of Sedalia, in Pettis County, Missouri. It was formerly Sedalia Memorial Airport. The National Plan of Integrated Airport Systems for 2011–2015 categorized it as a general aviation facility.

== Facilities ==
Sedalia Regional Airport covers 507 acres (205 ha) at an elevation of 910 feet (277 m). It has two runways: 18/36 is 5,500 by 100 feet (1,676 x 30 m) concrete; 5/23 is 3,519 by 50 feet (1,073 x 15 m) asphalt.

In the year ending September 30, 2009 the airport had 9,692 aircraft operations, average 26 per day: 65% general aviation, 25% air taxi, and 10% military. 18 aircraft were then based at the airport: 72% single-engine, 17% multi-engine, 6% jet, and 6% helicopter.

== Trivia ==
- The biggest plane ever to land at Sedalia was Bill Cosby's plane when he performed at the Missouri State Fair.
- The second biggest plane ever to land at Sedalia was Hank Williams, Jr.'s plane when he performed at the Missouri State Fair.

== See also ==
- List of airports in Missouri
