= Stockton Municipal Airport (Missouri) =

Airport in Missouri, United States

- IATA: none; ICAO: none; FAA LID: MO3

Summary
- Airport type: Public
- Owner: City of Stockton
- Serves: Stockton, Missouri
- Elevation AMSL: 1,043 ft (318 m)
- Coordinates: 37°39′37″N 093°49′01″W

Map
- Location of airport in Missouri MO3 (the United States)

Runways
| Direction | Length | | Surface |
| Direction | ft | m | Surface |
|---|---|---|---|
| 1/19 | 3,060 | 933 | Asphalt |

Statistics (2020)
- Aircraft operations: 1,215
- Based aircraft: 7
- Source: Federal Aviation Administration

Stockton Municipal Airport (FAA LID: MO3) is a city-owned, public-use airport located three nautical miles (6 km) southwest of the central business district of Stockton, a city in Cedar County, Missouri, United States.

== Facilities and aircraft ==
Stockton Municipal Airport covers an area of 162 acres (66 ha) at an elevation of 1,043 feet (318 m) above mean sea level. It has one runway designated 1/19 with an asphalt surface measuring 3,060 by 50 feet (933 x 15 m).

For the 12-month period ending December 31, 2020, the airport had 1,215 aircraft operations, an average of 23 per week: 83% general aviation and 17% military. At that time there were seven single-engine aircraft based at this airport.

== See also ==
- List of airports in Missouri
