= Warsaw Municipal Airport =

Warsaw Municipal Airport may refer to:

- Warsaw Municipal Airport (Indiana) in Warsaw, Indiana, United States (FAA: ASW)
- Warsaw Municipal Airport (Missouri) in Warsaw, Missouri, United States (FAA: RAW)
