= Osceola Municipal Airport (Missouri) =

- IATA: none; ICAO: none; FAA LID: 23MU

Summary
- Airport type: Public
- Owner: City of Osceola
- Serves: Osceola, Missouri
- Elevation AMSL: 900 ft / 274 m
- Coordinates: 38°01′07″N 093°41′36″W
- Interactive map of Osceola Municipal Airport

Runways
Direction	Length		Surface
Direction	ft	m	Surface
18/36	2,430	741	Turf/gravel

Statistics (2007)
- Aircraft operations: 470
- Based aircraft: 5
- Source: Federal Aviation Administration

Osceola Municipal Airport (FAA LID: 23MU) is a city-owned, public-use airport located two miles (3 km) south of the central business district of Osceola, a city in St. Clair County, Missouri, United States.

== Facilities and aircraft ==
Osceola Municipal Airport covers an area of 41 acres (17 ha) and has one runway designated 18/36 with a 2,430 x 74 ft (741 x 23 m) turf and gravel surface.

For the 12-month period ending June 12, 2007, the airport had 470 general aviation aircraft operations, an average of 39 per month. At that time there were 5 single-engine aircraft based at this airport.

== See also ==
- List of airports in Missouri
