= Marshall Memorial Municipal Airport =

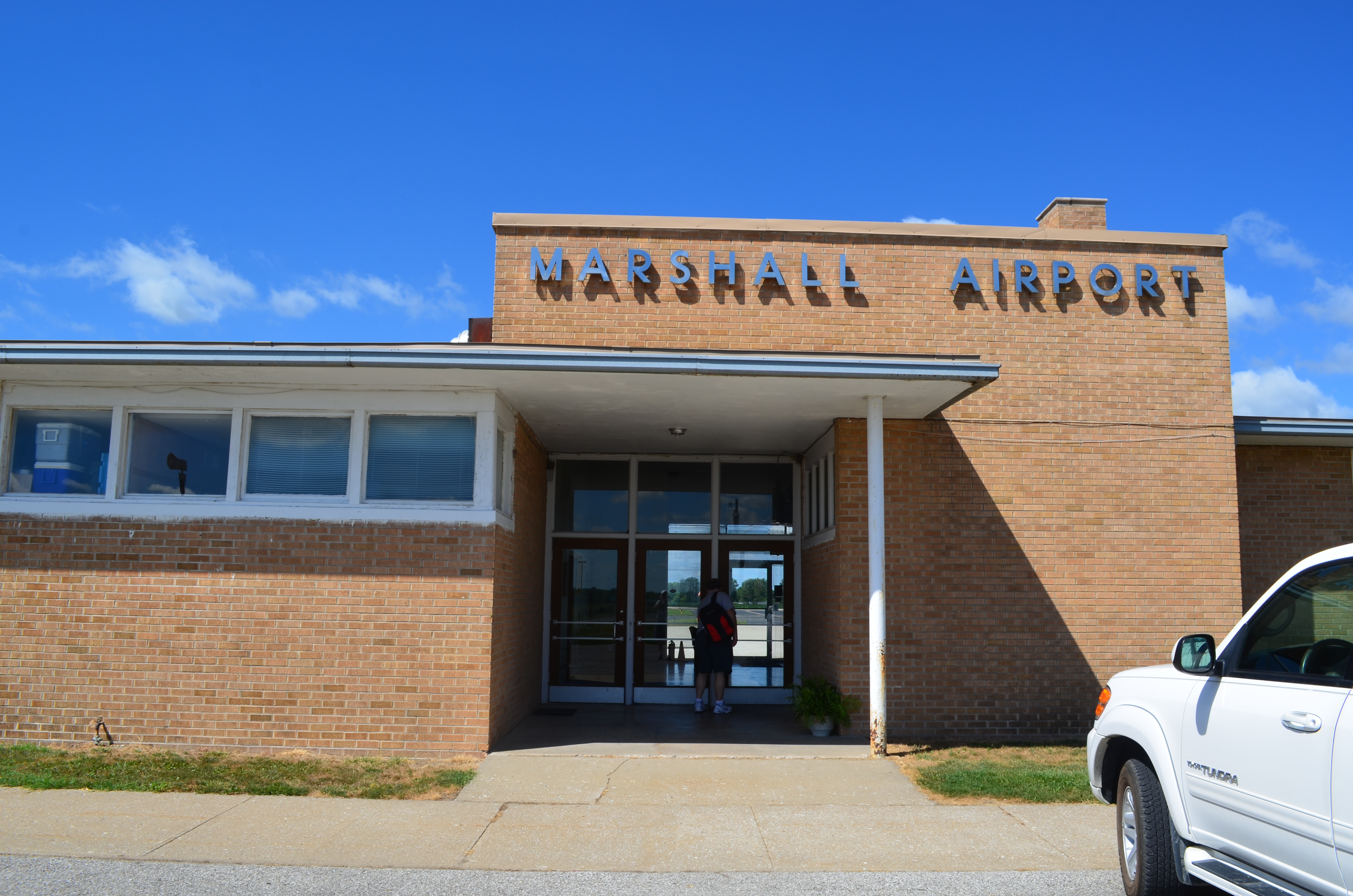
- IATA: MHL; ICAO: KMHL; FAA LID: MHL

Summary
- Airport type: Public
- Owner: City of Marshall
- Serves: Marshall, Missouri
- Elevation AMSL: 779 ft / 237 m
- Coordinates: 39°05′44″N 093°12′10″W

Map
- Location of airport in Missouri MHL (the United States)

Runways
Direction	Length		Surface
Direction	ft	m	Surface
18/36	5,006	1,526	Asphalt
9/27	3,320	1,012	Turf

Statistics (2011)
- Aircraft operations: 5,490
- Based aircraft: 24
- Source: Federal Aviation Administration

Marshall Memorial Municipal Airport (IATA: MHL, ICAO: KMHL, FAA LID: MHL) is a city-owned, public-use airport located two nautical miles (4 km) south of the central business district of Marshall, a city in Saline County, Missouri, United States. It is included in the National Plan of Integrated Airport Systems for 2011–2015, which categorized it as a general aviation facility.

== Facilities and aircraft ==
Marshall Memorial Municipal Airport covers an area of 225 acres (91 ha) at an elevation of 779 feet (237 m) above mean sea level. It has two runways: 18/36 is 5,006 by 75 feet (1,526 x 23 m) with an asphalt surface and 9/27 is 3,320 by 150 feet (1,012 x 46 m) with a turf surface.

For the 12-month period ending December 31, 2011, the airport had 5,490 aircraft operations, an average of 15 per day: 93% general aviation, 6% air taxi, and 1% military. At that time there were 24 single-engine aircraft based at this airport.

== See also ==
- List of airports in Missouri
