= Neosho Hugh Robinson Airport =

Airport in Missouri, United States

- IATA: EOS; ICAO: KEOS; FAA LID: EOS

Summary
- Airport type: Public
- Owner: City of Neosho
- Serves: Neosho, Missouri
- Elevation AMSL: 1,255 ft (383 m)
- Coordinates: 36°48′39″N 94°23′30″W

Map
- Location within Missouri EOS (the United States)

Runways
| Direction | Length | | Surface |
| Direction | ft | m | Surface |
|---|---|---|---|
| 1/19 | 5,001 | 1,524 | Asphalt |

Statistics (2008)
- Aircraft operations: 3,110
- Based aircraft: 43
- Source: Federal Aviation Administration

Neosho Hugh Robinson Airport (IATA: EOS, ICAO: KEOS, FAA LID: EOS) is a city-owned public-use airport located three nautical miles (6 km) south of the central business district of Neosho, a city in Newton County, Missouri, United States.

== Facilities and aircraft ==
Neosho Hugh Robinson Airport covers an area of 687 acres (278 ha) at an elevation of 1,255 feet (383 m) above mean sea level. It has one asphalt paved runway designated 1/19 which measures 5,001 by 100 feet (1,524 x 30 m).

For the 12-month period ending February 27, 2008, the airport had 3,110 aircraft operations, an average of 259 per month: 93% general aviation, 6% air taxi and 1% military. At that time there were 43 aircraft based at this airport: 79% single-engine, 9% multi-engine and 12% helicopter.

== See also ==
- List of airports in Missouri
