= Farmington Regional Airport =

Airport in Missouri

- IATA: none; ICAO: KFAM; FAA LID: FAM

Summary
- Airport type: Public
- Operator: Farmington, Missouri
- Elevation AMSL: 946 ft / 288 m
- Coordinates: 37°45′39.7″N 090°25′43″W
- Website: https://farmington-mo.gov/airport/

Map
- Location of airport in Missouri FAM (the United States)

Runways
Direction	Length		Surface
Direction	ft	m	Surface
02/20	4,222	1,287	Concrete

Statistics (2019)
- Aircraft Operations: 11,800
- Based aircraft: 26

Farmington Regional Airport (ICAO: KFAM, FAA LID: FAM) is a public airport located about 1.5 miles (2.4 kilometers) south of the center of Farmington, a city located in St. Francois County, Missouri, United States.

Although many U.S. airports use the same 3-letter location identifier for the FAA and IATA, this airport is not designated by the IATA.

This facility is included in the National Plan of Integrated Airport Systems, which categorized it as a general aviation airport.

== Facilities and aircraft ==
Farmington Regional Airport covers an area of 188 acres (76 ha) at an elevation of 946 feet (288 m) above mean sea level (AMSL). It has one concrete runway measuring 4,222 feet (1,287 m) long and 75 feet (23 m) wide with the designation 02/20.

For the 12-month period ending on December 31, 2019, the airport had 11,800 operations, an average of 32 per day: 91% general aviation, 8.5% air taxi, and 0.4% military. At that time there were 26 aircraft based at the airport: 18 single-engine aircraft, 5 multi-engine aircraft, 2 jet aircraft and 1 helicopter.

== See also ==
- List of airports in Missouri
