= Lincoln Municipal Airport (Missouri) =

- IATA: none; ICAO: none; FAA LID: 0R2

Summary
- Airport type: Public
- Owner: City of Lincoln
- Serves: Lincoln, Missouri
- Elevation AMSL: 940 ft / 287 m
- Coordinates: 38°24′08″N 093°19′56″W

Map
- Location of airport in Missouri 0R2 (the United States)

Runways
Direction	Length		Surface
Direction	ft	m	Surface
18/36	2,940	896	Turf

Statistics (2010)
- Aircraft operations: 1,660
- Based aircraft: 6
- Source: Federal Aviation Administration

Lincoln Municipal Airport (FAA LID: 0R2) is a public use airport located in Lincoln, a city in Benton County, Missouri, United States. It is owned by the City of Lincoln.

== Facilities and aircraft ==
Lincoln Municipal Airport covers an area of 17 acres (7 ha) at an elevation of 940 feet (287 m) above mean sea level. It has one runway designated 18/36 with a turf surface measuring 2,940 by 125 feet (896 x 38 m).

For the 12-month period ending July 1, 2010, the airport had 1,660 aircraft operations, an average of 138 per month: 96% general aviation and 4% military. At that time there were six single-engine aircraft based at this airport.

== See also ==
- List of airports in Missouri
