= Lexington Municipal Airport =

- IATA: none; ICAO: none; FAA LID: 4K3

Summary
- Airport type: Public use
- Owner: Tom Dolphin
- Serves: Lexington, Missouri
- Elevation AMSL: 691 ft / 211 m
- Coordinates: 39°12′35″N 093°55′41″W
- Interactive map of Lexington Municipal Airport

Runways
Direction	Length		Surface
Direction	ft	m	Surface
4/22	2,925	892	Asphalt
13/31	3,100	945	Turf
18/36	2,250	686	Turf

Statistics (2007)
- Aircraft operations: 3,375
- Based aircraft: 7
- Source: Federal Aviation Administration

Lexington Municipal Airport (FAA LID: 4K3) is a privately owned public-use airport located three nautical miles (6 km) northwest of the central business district of Lexington, in Ray County, Missouri, United States.

The airport is located just south of Henrietta, Missouri and is home to the Missouri Valley River Skydivers (MRVS), who regularly jump on weekends.

== Facilities and aircraft ==
Lexington Municipal Airport covers an area of 160 acres (65 ha) at an elevation of 691 feet (211 m) above mean sea level. It has three runways: 04-22 is a 2,925 by 40 ft (892 x 12 m) asphalt strip with runway 04 at 47° and 22 at 247°; 13-31 is a grass field measuring 3,100 by 125 ft (945 x 38 m); 18-36 is also grass and measures 2,250 by 125 ft (686 x 38 m). 04-22 markings are well faded, while the other two are not marked. 04-22 has lights, LIRL 122.7 CTAF. This airfield does not have fuel for sale, only for DZ operations.

For the 12-month period ending September 5, 2007, the airport had 3,375 aircraft operations, an average of 281 per month: 89% general aviation, 9% military and 2% air taxi. At that time there were 7 aircraft based at this airport, all single-engine.

== The Dam Skydivers ==
The skydiving training center which was previously open at this airport has been relocated to Stockton, MO and is currently doing business as The Dam Skydivers at the Stockton Municipal Airport adjacent to Stockton Lake, with one Cessna 182 aircraft. The owners operate generally every weekend that weather is cooperative.

== See also ==
- List of airports in Missouri
