= A. Paul Vance Fredericktown Regional Airport =

Airport in Missouri, United States

- IATA: none; ICAO: none; FAA LID: H88

Summary
- Airport type: Public
- Owner: City of Fredericktown
- Serves: Fredericktown, Missouri
- Elevation AMSL: 880 ft (270 m)
- Coordinates: 37°36′20″N 090°17′15″W
- Website: FredericktownMO.org/...
- Interactive map of A. Paul Vance Fredericktown Regional Airport

Runways
Direction	Length		Surface
Direction	ft	m	Surface
1/19	4,000	1,219	Asphalt

Statistics (2019)
- Aircraft operations: 2,470
- Based aircraft: 21
- Source: Federal Aviation Administration

A. Paul Vance Fredericktown Regional Airport (FAA LID: H88) is a city-owned, public-use airport located three nautical miles (6 km) north of the central business district of Fredericktown, a city in Madison County, Missouri, United States. It is included in the National Plan of Integrated Airport Systems for 2011–2015, which categorized it as a general aviation airport. It was previously known as Fredericktown Regional Airport.

== History ==
Fredericktown Regional Airport was established in September 1959 with a 1500 feet runway. For more than two decades, a mobile home trailer served as the airport’s terminal. However, a permanent terminal building was completed in 2011. The opening was celebrated with a special ceremony held on 6 August, 2011. In August 2011, the airport was renamed to honor Paul Vance, a former Navy pilot, flight instructor, corporate pilot, and aeronautics development director for the City of St. Louis. The ceremony was attended by directors and members of the Missouri Pilot's Association, the Gateway Eagles, Arch Medical Helicopter Service, and the Monsanto Corporate Aviation Department. Pilots as far as Huntsville and Alabama flew to attend the ceremony. The Missouri Wing of the Commemorative Air Forces' North American B-25 Mitchell also conducted a four-pass flyover, which was a highlight of the event.

=== Present ===
In December 2017, the main taxiway and apron was rehabilitated, which included reconstruction and upgrading the apron area near the hangars. Today, the airport is publicly owned and has no control tower. It offers services including a lounge, rest rooms, a shower, a snooze room, and a weather briefing flight planning kiosk.

== Facilities and aircraft ==
A. Paul Vance Fredericktown Regional Airport covers an area of 83 acres (34 ha) at an elevation of 880 feet (268 m) above mean sea level. It has one runway designated 1/19 with an asphalt surface measuring 4,000 by 75 feet (1,219 x 23 m).

For the 12 months ending December 31, 2019, the airport had 2,470 aircraft operations, an average of 47 per week: 97% general aviation, 2% air taxi, and <1% military. At that time, were 21 aircraft based at this airport: 18 single-engine, 2 multi-engine, and 1 ultralight.

== See also ==
- List of airports in Missouri
