= Cassville Municipal Airport (Missouri) =

Airport in Missouri, United States

Coordinates: 36°41′51″N 93°54′03″W

Cassville Municipal Airport is a public use airport located approximately two nautical miles northwest of Cassville, Missouri. The field elevation is 1483 feet above mean sea level, and the FAA location identifier is 94K. The airport has a single runway, designated 9/27, with an asphalt surface, 3,599 feet long by 60 feet wide. The airport is owned by the city of Cassville and has no control tower.

== See also ==
- List of airports in Missouri
