= Bethany Memorial Airport =

- IATA: none; ICAO: none; FAA LID: 75K

Summary
- Airport type: Public
- Owner: City of Bethany
- Serves: Bethany, Missouri
- Elevation AMSL: 1,035 ft (315 m)
- Coordinates: 40°16′37″N 094°00′27″W

Map
- Location of airport in Missouri 75K (the United States)

Runways
| Direction | Length | | Surface |
| Direction | ft | m | Surface |
|---|---|---|---|
| 3/21 | 2,255 | 687 | Asphalt |

Statistics (2011)
- Aircraft operations: 82
- Source: Federal Aviation Administration

Bethany Memorial Airport (FAA LID: 75K) is a public use airport in Harrison County, Missouri. It is owned by the city of Bethany and located two nautical miles (4 km) northeast of its central business district.

== Facilities and aircraft ==
Bethany Memorial Airport covers an area of 25 acres (10 ha) at an elevation of 1,035 feet (315 m) above mean sea level. It has one runway designated 3/21 with an asphalt surface measuring 2,255 by 48 feet (687 x 15 m). For the 12-month period ending June 30, 2011, the airport had 82 general aviation aircraft operations.

== See also ==
- List of airports in Missouri
