= Ava Bill Martin Memorial Airport =

- IATA: none; ICAO: KAOV; FAA LID: AOV

Summary
- Airport type: Public
- Owner: City of Ava
- Serves: Ava, Missouri
- Elevation AMSL: 1,311 ft (400 m)
- Coordinates: 36°58′19″N 092°40′55″W

Map
- Location of airport in Missouri AOV (the United States)

Runways
Direction	Length		Surface
Direction	ft	m	Surface
13/31	3,634	1,108	Asphalt

Statistics (2010)
- Aircraft operations: 1,270
- Based aircraft: 5
- Source: Federal Aviation Administration

Ava Bill Martin Memorial Airport (ICAO: KAOV, FAA LID: AOV) is a city-owned, public-use airport located two nautical miles (4 km) northwest of the central business district of Ava, a city in Douglas County, Missouri, United States.

Although many U.S. airports use the same three-letter location identifier for the FAA and IATA, this airport is assigned AOV by the FAA but has no designation from the IATA.

== Facilities and aircraft ==
Ava Bill Martin Memorial Airport covers an area of 62 acres (25 ha) at an elevation of 1,311 feet (400 m) above mean sea level. It has one runway designated 13/31 with an asphalt surface measuring 3,634 by 50 feet (1,108 x 15 m).

For the 12-month period ending March 31, 2010, the airport had 1,270 aircraft operations, an average of 105 per month: 98% general aviation and 2% military. At that time there were five aircraft based at this airport: 80% single-engine and 20% ultralight.

== See also ==
- List of airports in Missouri
