= Montgomery-Wehrman Airport =

- IATA: none; ICAO: none; FAA LID: 4MO

Summary
- Airport type: Private
- Owner: Howard Wehrman
- Serves: Montgomery City, Missouri
- Elevation AMSL: 778 ft / 237 m
- Coordinates: 39°00′46″N 091°25′10″W
- Interactive map of Montgomery-Wehrman Airport

Runways
Direction	Length		Surface
Direction	ft	m	Surface
3/21	2,360	719	Turf/gravel

Statistics (2010)
- Aircraft operations: 990
- Based aircraft: 5
- Sources: FAA, Missouri DOT

Montgomery-Wehrman Airport (FAA LID: 4MO) is a privately owned airport located four nautical miles (5 mi, 7 km) northeast of the central business district of Montgomery City, in Montgomery County, Missouri, United States.

== Facilities and aircraft ==
Montgomery-Wehrman Airport covers an area of 11 acres (4 ha) at an elevation of 778 feet (237 m) above mean sea level. It has one runway designated 3/21 with a turf and gravel surface measuring 2,360 by 75 feet (719 x 23 m).

For the 12-month period ending January 31, 2010, the airport had 990 aircraft operations, an average of 82 per month: 93% general aviation and 7% air taxi. At that time there were five aircraft based at this airport, all single-engine.

== See also ==
- List of airports in Missouri
