= Cameron Memorial Airport =

Airport in Missouri, United States

- IATA: none; ICAO: KEZZ; FAA LID: EZZ

Summary
- Airport type: Public
- Owner: City of Cameron
- Serves: Cameron, Missouri
- Elevation AMSL: 1,040 ft (320 m)
- Coordinates: 39°43′39″N 094°16′35″W

Map
- Location of airport in Missouri

Runways
Direction	Length		Surface
Direction	ft	m	Surface
17/35	4,000	1,219	Concrete

Statistics (2020)
- Aircraft operations: 8,142
- Based aircraft: 25
- Source: Federal Aviation Administration

Cameron Memorial Airport (ICAO: KEZZ, FAA LID: EZZ) is a public use airport in Clinton County, Missouri, United States. It is owned by the city of Cameron and located two nautical miles (4 km) southwest of its central business district. This airport is included in the National Plan of Integrated Airport Systems, which categorized it as a general aviation facility.

Although many U.S. airports use the same three-letter location identifier for the FAA and IATA, this airport is assigned EZZ by the FAA but has no designation from the IATA.

== Facilities and aircraft ==
Cameron Memorial Airport covers an area of 202 acres (82 ha) at an elevation of 1,040 feet (317 m) above mean sea level. It has one runway designated 17/35 with a concrete surface measuring 4,000 by 75 feet (1,219 x 23 m).

For the 12-month period ending December 31, 2020, the airport had 8,142 aircraft operations, an average of 22 per day: 96% general aviation, 4% air taxi, and <1% military. At that time there were 25 aircraft based at this airport: 23 single-engine, and 2 multi-engine.

== See also ==
- List of airports in Missouri
