= Mississippi County Airport =

Public airport in Mississippi County, Missouri

- IATA: none; ICAO: KCHQ; FAA LID: CHQ

Summary
- Airport type: Public
- Owner: Mississippi County Commission
- Serves: Charleston, Missouri
- Elevation AMSL: 313 ft / 95 m
- Coordinates: 36°50′32″N 089°21′35″W

Map
- Location of airport in Missouri CHQ (the United States)

Runways
Direction	Length		Surface
Direction	ft	m	Surface
18/36	3,196	974	Asphalt

Statistics (2009)
- Aircraft operations: 1,215
- Source: Federal Aviation Administration

Mississippi County Airport (ICAO: KCHQ, FAA LID: CHQ) is a public use airport in Mississippi County, Missouri, United States. It is owned by the Mississippi County Commission and located four nautical miles (5 mi, 7 km) south of the central business district of Charleston, Missouri.

Although many U.S. airports use the same three-letter location identifier for the FAA and IATA, this airport is assigned CHQ by the FAA but has no designation from the IATA, (which assigned CHQ to Chania International Airport serving Chania, Greece).

== Facilities and aircraft ==
Mississippi County Airport covers an area of 100 acres (40 ha) at an elevation of 313 feet (95 m) above mean sea level. It has one runway designated 18/36 with an asphalt surface measuring 3,196 by 60 feet (974 x 18 m). For the 12-month period ending June 30, 2009, the airport had 1,215 aircraft operations, an average of 101 per month: 99% general aviation and 1% military.

== See also ==
- List of airports in Missouri
