= Lee C. Fine Memorial Airport =

- IATA: AIZ; ICAO: KAIZ; FAA LID: AIZ

Summary
- Airport type: Public
- Operator: City of Osage Beach
- Location: Lake Ozark, Missouri
- Elevation AMSL: 869 ft / 265 m
- Coordinates: 38°05′45.72″N 92°32′58.15″W
- Interactive map of Lee C. Fine Memorial Airport

Runways
Direction	Length		Surface
Direction	ft	m	Surface
4/22	6,497	1,980	Asphalt

Lee C. Fine Memorial Airport (IATA: AIZ, ICAO: KAIZ, FAA LID: AIZ) a public airport located in Lake of the Ozarks State Park in Kaiser, Missouri, United States. The airport is owned by the city of Osage Beach.

== Facilities ==
Lee C. Fine Memorial Airport covers 610 acres (247 ha) and has one runway:

- Runway 4/22: 6,497 x 100 ft (1,980 x 30 m), surface: asphalt

== Historical airline service ==
- Ozark Airlines DC-9 and Skyway Airlines Beech 99, Beech 18 and DC-3 service

== See also ==
- List of airports in Missouri
