= Hannibal Regional Airport =

Airport in Missouri, United States of America

Hannibal Regional Airport William P. Lear Field
- IATA: none; ICAO: KHAE; FAA LID: HAE

Summary
- Airport type: Public
- Owner: City of Hannibal
- Serves: Hannibal, Missouri
- Elevation AMSL: 769 ft (234 m)
- Coordinates: 39°43′31″N 091°26′38″W
- Website: www.flyhannibal.net

Map
- Location of airport in Missouri HAE (the United States)

Runways
Direction	Length		Surface
Direction	ft	m	Surface
17/35	4,400	1,341	Concrete

Statistics (2021)
- Aircraft operations: 9,661
- Based aircraft: 15
- Source: Federal Aviation Administration

Hannibal Regional Airport (ICAO: KHAE, FAA LID: HAE), formerly Hannibal Municipal Airport, is a public use airport in Marion County, Missouri, United States. It is located four nautical miles (7 km) northwest of the central business district of Hannibal, Missouri, and is owned by the City of Hannibal. The airport is used for general aviation with no commercial airlines.

Although most U.S. airports use the same three-letter location identifier for the FAA and IATA, this airport is assigned HAE by the FAA but has no designation from the IATA.

== History ==
In 2003, the airfield was dedicated to William P. Lear, the inventor of the Lear Jet.

== Facilities and aircraft ==
Hannibal Regional Airport covers an area of 400 acres (160 ha) at an elevation of 769 feet (234 m) above mean sea level. It has one runway designated 17/35 with a concrete surface measuring 4,400 by 100 feet (1,341 x 30 m) with a concrete surface. Runway 17/35 has Runway End Identifier Lights (REIL) and Precision Approach Path Indicator (PAPI) lights on each runway end.

The airport originally had an asphalt runway that was 3,600 feet (1,100 m) x 75 feet (23 m) with no parallel taxiway. In 2002 the airport was completely shut down for almost 6 months while the old runway and apron were completely removed and a new concrete runway (4,400 x 100 ft.) was constructed. In addition to the new runway, a concrete full-length parallel taxiway was constructed, the apron was re-constructed with concrete, and a new hangar area was constructed.

Beginning in 2008, the airport's Fixed-Base Operator (FBO) is Mike Barron of Barron Aviation Private Flight Services. Prior to that, Rodney Hilton managed the airport.

For the 12-month period ending December 31, 2021, the airport had 9,661 aircraft operations, an average of 26 per day: 96% general aviation, 3% air taxi, and <1% military. At that time there were 15 aircraft based at this airport: 12 single-engine, 1 multi-engine, 1 jet, and 1 helicopter.

== Plans ==
The plans include extending the runway to 5,000 ft to allow small jets to use the airport. In addition, a new terminal building is planned for the airport.

== See also ==
- List of airports in Missouri
