= Floyd W. Jones Lebanon Airport =

- IATA: none; ICAO: KLBO; FAA LID: LBO

Summary
- Airport type: Public
- Owner: City of Lebanon
- Serves: Lebanon, Missouri
- Elevation AMSL: 1,321 ft (403 m)
- Coordinates: 37°38′54″N 092°39′09″W

Map
- Location of airport in Missouri LBO (the United States)

Runways
Direction	Length		Surface
Direction	ft	m	Surface
18/36	5,000	1,524	Asphalt

Statistics
- Aircraft operations (2020): 18,125
- Based aircraft (2023): 28
- Source: Federal Aviation Administration

Floyd W. Jones Lebanon Airport (ICAO: KLBO, FAA LID: LBO) is a city-owned public-use airport located three nautical miles (6 km) south of the central business district of Lebanon, a city in Laclede County, Missouri, United States. This airport is included in the National Plan of Integrated Airport Systems for 2011–2015, which categorized it as a general aviation airport.

Although most U.S. airports use the same three-letter location identifier for the FAA and IATA, this airport is assigned LBO by the FAA, but has no designation from the IATA (which assigned LBO to Lusambo Airport in the Democratic Republic of the Congo).

== Facilities and aircraft ==
Floyd W. Jones Lebanon Airport covers an area of 277 acres (112 ha) at an elevation of 1,321 feet (403 m) above mean sea level. It has one runway designated 18/36 with an asphalt surface measuring 5,000 by 75 feet (1,524 x 23 m).

For the 12-month period ending December 31, 2020, the airport had 18,125 aircraft operations, an average of 50 per day: 93% general aviation, 4% air taxi and 3% military. In November 2023, there were 28 aircraft based at this airport: 23 single-engine, 1 multi-engine, 3 jet and 1 helicopter.

== See also ==
- List of airports in Missouri
