= Midwest National Air Center =

- IATA: none; ICAO: KGPH; FAA LID: GPH

Summary
- Airport type: Public
- Owner: Clay County Commission
- Serves: Clay County, Missouri
- Location: Mosby / Excelsior Springs
- Elevation AMSL: 777 ft / 237 m
- Coordinates: 39°19′57″N 094°18′35″W

Map

Runways
Direction	Length		Surface
Direction	ft	m	Surface
18/36	5,504	1,678	Asphalt

Statistics (2010)
- Aircraft operations: 25,520
- Based aircraft: 53
- Source: Federal Aviation Administration

Midwest National Air Center (ICAO: KGPH, FAA LID: GPH) is a public-use airport in Clay County, Missouri, United States. The airport is located one nautical mile (1.85 km) north of the central business district of Mosby, near Excelsior Springs. It is owned by the Clay County Commission and was formerly known as Clay County Regional Airport.

This airport is included in the FAA's National Plan of Integrated Airport Systems for 2009–2013, which categorized it as a general aviation facility.

Although many U.S. airports use the same three-letter location identifier for the FAA and IATA, this facility is assigned GPH by the FAA but has no designation from the IATA.

== Facilities and aircraft ==
Midwest National Air Center covers an area of 573 acres (232 ha) at an elevation of 777 feet (237 m) above mean sea level. It has one runway designated 18/36 with an asphalt surface measuring 5,504 by 100 feet (1,678 x 30 m).

For the 12-month period ending March 31, 2010, the airport had 25,520 aircraft operations, an average of 69 per day: 90% general aviation, 10% air taxi, and <1% military. At that time there were 53 aircraft based at this airport: 77% single-engine, 15% multi-engine, 6% jet, and 2% helicopter.

== See also ==
- List of airports in Missouri
