= Mountain View Airport (Missouri) =

Coordinates: 36°59′34″N 091°42′52″W

- IATA: none; ICAO: KMNF; FAA LID: MNF

Summary
- Airport type: Public
- Owner: City of Mountain View
- Serves: Mountain View, Missouri
- Elevation AMSL: 1,181 ft / 360 m
- Interactive map of Mountain View Airport

Runways
Direction	Length		Surface
Direction	ft	m	Surface
10/28	5,005	1,526	Asphalt

Statistics (2005)
- Aircraft operations: 7,330
- Source: Federal Aviation Administration

Mountain View Airport (ICAO: KMNF, FAA LID: MNF) is a public airport located one mile (2 km) southwest of the central business district of Mountain View, a city in Howell County, Missouri, United States. It is owned by the City of Mountain View.

Although most U.S. airports use the same three-letter location identifier for the FAA and IATA, Mountain View Airport is assigned MNF by the FAA but has no designation from the IATA (which assigned MNF to the airport on Mana Island in Fiji).

== Facilities and aircraft ==
Mountain View Airport covers an area of 120 acres (49 ha) which contains one asphalt paved runway (10/28) measuring 5,005 x 75 ft (1,526 x 23 m). For the 12-month period ending August 31, 2005, the airport had 7,330 aircraft operations, an average of 20 per day: 97% general aviation, 3% air taxi and <1% military.

== See also ==
- List of airports in Missouri
