= Princeton-Kauffman Memorial Airport =

- IATA: none; ICAO: none; FAA LID: 7MO

Summary
- Airport type: Public
- Owner: City of Princeton
- Serves: Princeton, Missouri
- Elevation AMSL: 858 ft / 262 m
- Coordinates: 40°25′16″N 093°35′58″W
- Interactive map of Princeton-Kauffman Memorial Airport

Runways
Direction	Length		Surface
Direction	ft	m	Surface
18/36	2,475	754	Turf

Statistics (2011)
- Aircraft operations: 130
- Sources: FAA, Missouri DOT

Princeton-Kauffman Memorial Airport (FAA LID: 7MO) is a city-owned, public-use airport located two nautical miles (4 km) northwest of the central business district of Princeton, a city in Mercer County, Missouri, United States.

== Facilities and aircraft ==
Princeton-Kauffman Memorial Airport covers an area of 20 acres (8 ha) at an elevation of 858 feet (262 m) above mean sea level. It has one runway designated 18/36 with a turf surface measuring 2,475 by 100 feet (754 x 30 m). For the 12-month period ending April 30, 2011, the airport had 130 general aviation aircraft operations.
