= Monroe City Regional Airport =

Airport in Missouri, United States

Monroe City Regional Airport Capt. Ben Smith Airfield
- IATA: none; ICAO: none; FAA LID: K52

Summary
- Airport type: Public
- Owner: City of Monroe
- Serves: Monroe City, Missouri
- Elevation AMSL: 737 ft / 225 m
- Coordinates: 39°38′04″N 091°43′37″W
- Interactive map of Monroe City Regional Airport

Runways
Direction	Length		Surface
Direction	ft	m	Surface
9/27	3,515	1,071	Asphalt

Statistics (2008)
- Aircraft operations: 2,060
- Based aircraft: 12
- Source: Federal Aviation Administration

Monroe City Regional Airport (FAA LID: K52) is a public use airport located one nautical mile (1.85 km) south of the central business district of Monroe City, in Monroe County, Missouri, United States. It is owned by the City of Monroe and is also known as Capt. Ben Smith Airfield.

== Facilities and aircraft ==
Monroe City Airport covers an area of 85 acres (34 ha) at an elevation of 737 feet (225 m) above mean sea level. It has one runway designated 9/27 with an asphalt surface measuring 3,515 by 50 feet (1,071 x 15 m).

For the 12-month period ending April 9, 2008, the airport had 2,060 aircraft operations, an average of 171 per month: 97% general aviation, 2% air taxi, and 1% military. At that time there were 12 single-engine aircraft based at this airport.

== See also ==
- List of airports in Missouri
