= Lamar Municipal Airport (Missouri) =

- IATA: none; ICAO: KLLU; FAA LID: LLU

Summary
- Airport type: Public
- Owner: City of Lamar
- Serves: Lamar, Missouri
- Opened: March 1951
- Time zone: CST (UTC−06:00)
  - Summer (DST): CDT (UTC−05:00)
- Elevation AMSL: 1,010 ft / 308 m
- Coordinates: 37°29′10″N 094°18′43″W

Map
- Location of airport in Missouri LLU (the United States)

Runways
| Direction | Length | | Surface |
| Direction | ft | m | Surface |
|---|---|---|---|
| 17/35 | 4,000 | 1,220 | Concrete |
| 3/21 | 2,900 | 885 | Asphalt |

Statistics
- Aircraft operations (2019): 5,320
- Based aircraft (2024): 21
- Source: Federal Aviation Administration

Lamar Municipal Airport (ICAO: KLLU, FAA LID: LLU) is a public airport located two miles southwest of the town of Lamar, in Barton County, Missouri, United States.

It is included in the Federal Aviation Administration (FAA) National Plan of Integrated Airport Systems for 2025–2029, in which it is categorized as a local general aviation facility.

Most U.S. airports use the same three-letter location identifier for the FAA and IATA, but Lamar Municipal Airport is LLU to the FAA and has no IATA code. (IATA assigned LLU to Alluitsup Paa, Greenland).

== Facilities ==
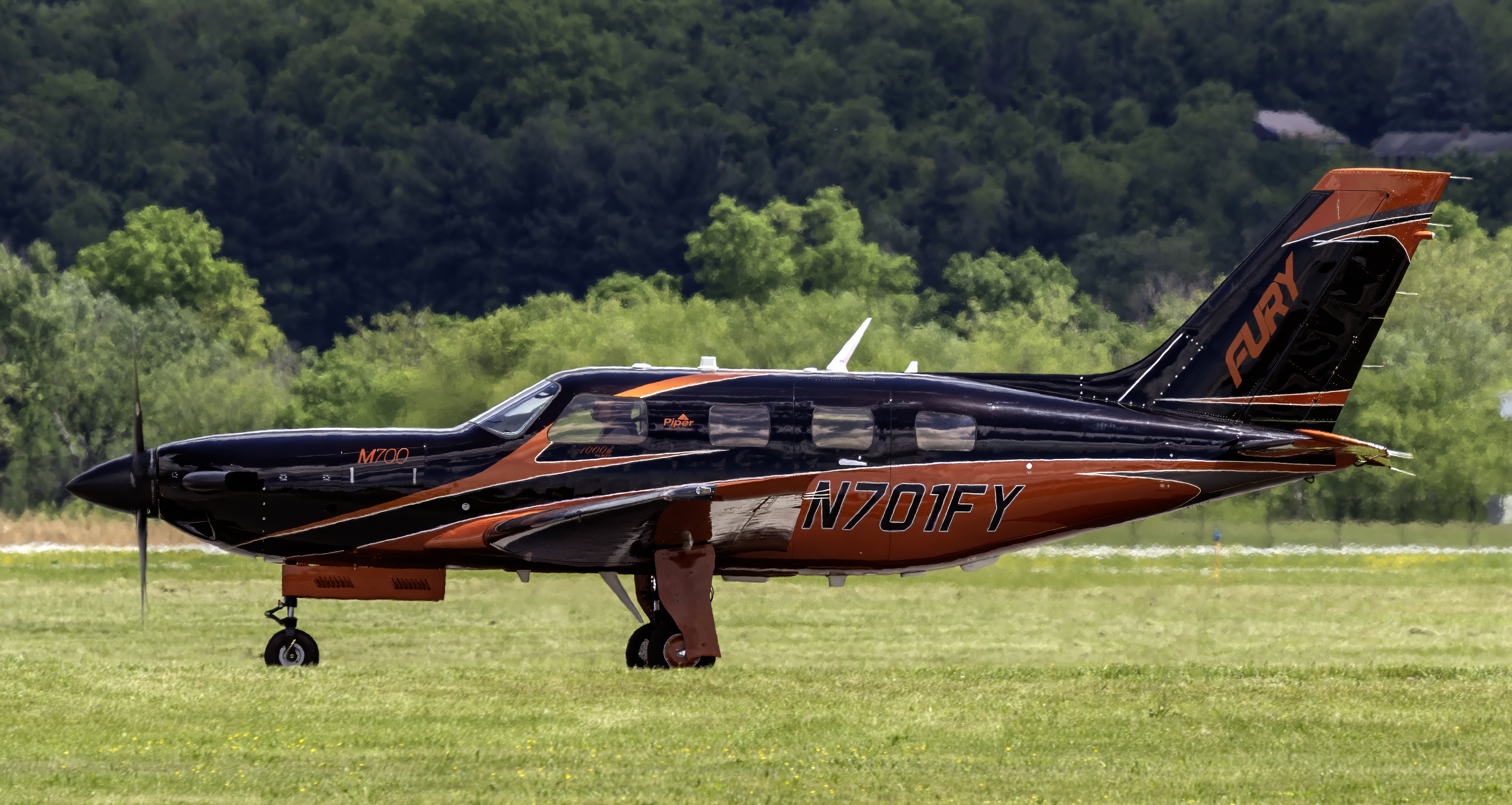
M700 Fury

Lamar Municipal Airport covers 105 acres (42 ha) at an elevation of 1,009.8 feet (307.8 m) above mean sea level. It has two runways, the primary runway 17/35 is a concrete runway 4,000 by 75 feet (1,220 x 23 m) and the crosswind runway 3/21 is a 2,900 by 60 feet (885 x 18 m) asphalt runway. Runways 17/35 and 3 have approved GPS approaches.

For the 12-month period ending December 31, 2019 the airport had 5,320 aircraft operations, an average of 15 per day: 94% general aviation, 6% air taxi and less than 1% military.

In August 2024, there were 21 aircraft based at this airport: 21 single-engine.

== See also ==
- List of airports in Missouri
