= Weiss Airport =

Weiss Airport (CLOSED)
- IATA: none; ICAO: none; FAA LID: 3WE

Summary
- Airport type: Public use
- Owner: Lilburn & Harley Weiss
- Serves: Fenton, Missouri
- Elevation AMSL: 435 ft (133 m)
- Coordinates: 38°32′11″N 090°26′49″W
- Interactive map of Weiss Airport (CLOSED)

Runways
Direction	Length		Surface
Direction	ft	m	Surface
18/36	3,100	945	Asphalt

Weiss Airport (FAA LID: 3WE) was a privately owned, public use airport located at 430 Rudder Ave in Fenton, Missouri in St. Louis County, Missouri, United States, approximately 13 nautical miles (24 km) WSW of St. Louis, Missouri. The airport closed on May 1, 1994.

== Facilities and aircraft ==
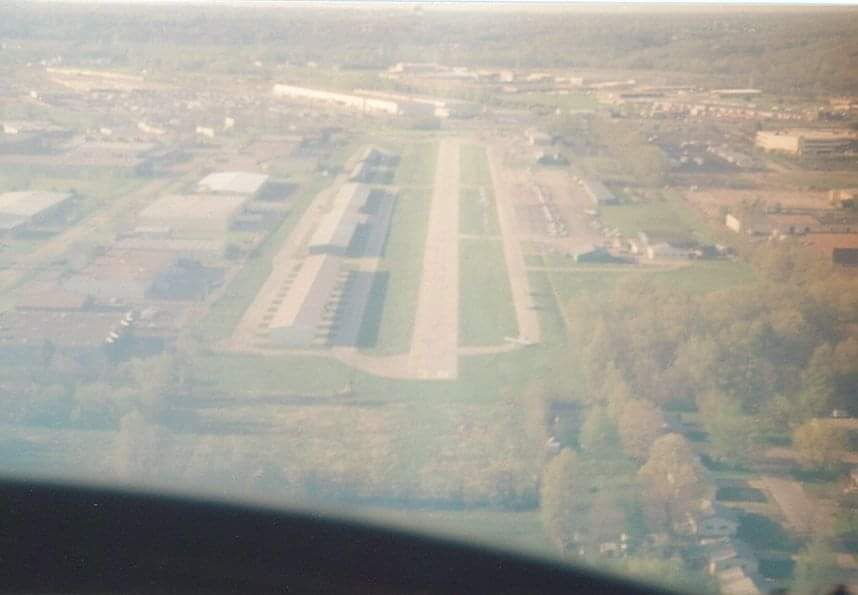
Weiss Airport in 1993

Weiss Airport covered an area of 52 acres (21 ha) at an elevation of 435 feet (132 m) above mean sea level. It had one asphalt paved runway designated 18/36 which measured 3,100 feet in length. It was the home of Midwest Air Service, and also served as a base for flight instruction.
