= Trenton Municipal Airport (Missouri) =

- IATA: TRX; ICAO: KTRX; FAA LID: TRX

Summary
- Airport type: Public
- Owner: City of Trenton
- Serves: Trenton, Missouri
- Elevation AMSL: 757 ft / 231 m
- Coordinates: 40°05′01″N 093°35′26″W
- Interactive map of Trenton Municipal Airport

Runways
Direction	Length		Surface
Direction	ft	m	Surface
18/36	4,310	1,314	Asphalt

Statistics (2007)
- Aircraft operations: 2,710
- Source: Federal Aviation Administration

Trenton Municipal Airport (IATA: TRX, ICAO: KTRX, FAA LID: TRX) is a city-owned, public-use airport located one mile (2 km) east of the central business district of Trenton, a city in Grundy County, Missouri, United States.

== Facilities and aircraft ==
Trenton Municipal Airport covers an area of 85 acres (34 ha) and has one runway designated 18/36 with a 4,310 x 75 ft (1,314 x 23 m) asphalt surface. For the 12-month period ending August 22, 2007, the airport had 2,710 aircraft operations, an average of 7 per day: 96% general aviation, 4% air taxi, <1% military.

== See also ==
- List of airports in Missouri
