= Downtown Airport (Missouri) =

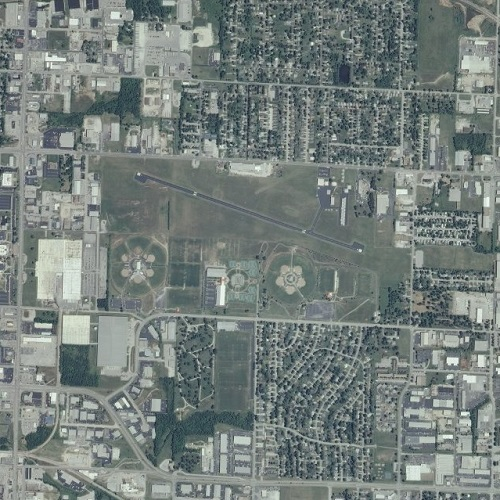
- IATA: none; ICAO: none; FAA LID: 3DW

Summary
- Airport type: Public
- Owner: Harry Cooper
- Serves: Springfield, Missouri
- Elevation AMSL: 1,374 ft (419 m)
- Coordinates: 37°13′18″N 093°14′52″W
- Public transit access: Springfield Transit Services
- Interactive map of Downtown Airport

Runways
Direction	Length		Surface
Direction	ft	m	Surface
11/29	4,035	1,230	Asphalt

Statistics (2020)
- Aircraft operations: 14,700
- Based aircraft: 42
- Source: Federal Aviation Administration

Downtown Airport (FAA LID: 3DW) is a privately owned, public-use airport located in the city of Springfield in Greene County, Missouri, United States.

== Facilities and aircraft ==
Downtown Airport covers an area of 160 acres (65 ha) and has one runway designated 11/29 with a 4,037 x 50 ft (1,230 x 15 m) asphalt surface.

For the 12-month period ending December 31, 2020, the airport had 14,700 aircraft operations, an average of 40 per day: 96% general aviation, 3% air taxi and 1% military. At that time there were 42 aircraft based at this airport: 37 single-engine, 3 multi-engine, and 2 jet.

== Accidents ==
On October 6, 2010, a Grumman American AA-5 crashed on the runway at the Downtown Airport. One person was killed, and 2 others were injured.

== See also ==
- List of airports in Missouri
