= Rolla Downtown Airport =

- IATA: none; ICAO: none; FAA LID: K07

Summary
- Airport type: Public use
- Owner: Maxine Dickman Fosmark
- Serves: Rolla, Missouri
- Elevation AMSL: 987 ft / 301 m
- Coordinates: 37°56′08″N 091°48′49″W

Map
- Location of airport in Missouri K07 (the United States)

Runways
Direction	Length		Surface
Direction	ft	m	Surface
9/27	3,028	923	Asphalt

Statistics (2011)
- Aircraft operations: 285
- Based aircraft: 2
- Source: Federal Aviation Administration

Rolla Downtown Airport (FAA LID: K07) is a privately owned, public use airport located three nautical miles (6 km) southwest of the central business district of Rolla, a city in Phelps County, Missouri, United States.

== Facilities and aircraft ==
Rolla Downtown Airport covers an area of 33 acres (13 ha) at an elevation of 987 feet (301 m) above mean sea level. It has one runway designated 9/27 with an asphalt surface measuring 3,028 by 38 feet (923 x 12 m).

For the 12-month period ending December 31, 2011, the airport had 285 general aviation aircraft operations, an average of 23 per month. At that time there were two single-engine aircraft based at this airport.

== See also ==
- List of airports in Missouri
- Rolla National Airport (FAA: VIH), located at 38°07′39″N 091°46′10″W
