= Unionville Municipal Airport =

Airport in Missouri, United States

- IATA: none; ICAO: none; FAA LID: K43

Summary
- Airport type: Public
- Owner: City of Unionville
- Serves: Unionville, Missouri
- Elevation AMSL: 1,045 ft (319 m)
- Coordinates: 40°32′25″N 093°01′32″W
- Interactive map of Unionville Municipal Airport

Runways
Direction	Length		Surface
Direction	ft	m	Surface
17/35	2,805	855	Asphalt

Statistics (2020)
- Aircraft operations: 2,228
- Based aircraft: 10
- Source: Federal Aviation Administration

Unionville Municipal Airport (FAA LID: K43) is a city-owned, public-use airport located three nautical miles (6 km) north of the central business district of Unionville, a city in Putnam County, Missouri, United States. It was previously known as Municipal Airport and was also known as Unionville Airport.

== Facilities and aircraft ==
Unionville Municipal Airport covers an area of 62 acres (25 ha) at an elevation of 1,045 feet (319 m) above mean sea level. It has one runway designated 17/35 with an asphalt surface measuring 2,805 by 49 feet (855 x 15 m).

For the 12-month period ending December 31, 2020, the airport had 2,228 aircraft operations, an average of 43 per week: 99% general aviation and 1% military. At that time there were 10 aircraft based at this airport, all single-engine.

== See also ==
- List of airports in Missouri
