= St. Charles Airport =

St. Charles Airport (CLOSED)
- IATA: none; ICAO: none; FAA LID: 3SQ

Summary
- Airport type: Public use
- Owner: P.F.A. Associates
- Serves: St. Charles, Missouri
- Elevation AMSL: 442 ft / 135 m
- Coordinates: 38°50′55″N 090°30′00″W
- Interactive map of St. Charles Airport (CLOSED)

Runways
Direction	Length		Surface
Direction	ft	m	Surface
09/27	3,451	1,052	Asphalt
15/33	2,310	704	Turf
18/36	2,145	654	Turf

Statistics (2007)
- Aircraft operations: 40,260
- Based aircraft: 77
- Source: Federal Aviation Administration

St. Charles Airport (FAA LID: 3SQ) was a privately owned, public use airport located four nautical miles (7.41 km) north of the central business district of the City of St. Charles in St. Charles County, Missouri, United States. According to the FAA's National Plan of Integrated Airport Systems for 2007–2011, it was categorized as a reliever airport. The airport closed on June 30, 2010, and was restored to agricultural use farmland.

Although most U.S. airports use the same three-letter location identifier for the FAA and IATA, St. Charles Airport was assigned 3SQ by the FAA but had no designation from the IATA.

== Facilities and aircraft ==
St. Charles Airport covered an area of 72 acres (29 ha) at an elevation of 442 feet (135 m) above mean sea level. It had one asphalt paved runway designated 09/27 which measured 3,451 by 50 feet (1,052 x 15 m) and two turf runways: 15/33 is 2,310 by 103 feet (704 x 31 m) and 18/36 is 2,145 by 100 feet (654 x 30 m).

For the 12-month period ending August 27, 2007, the airport had 40,260 aircraft operations, an average of 151 per day: 95% general aviation and 5% air taxi. At that time there were 77 aircraft based at this airport: 88% single-engine, 10% multi-engine, and 1% ultralight. St. Charles Flying Service was based at the field and moved to the nearby St. Charles Smartt airport.
