= Washington County Airport (Missouri) =

- IATA: none; ICAO: none; FAA LID: 8WC

Summary
- Airport type: Public
- Owner: Washington County
- Serves: Potosi, Missouri
- Elevation AMSL: 959 ft / 292 m
- Coordinates: 37°55′45″N 090°43′53″W

Map
- Location of airport in Missouri 8WC (the United States)

Runways
Direction	Length		Surface
Direction	ft	m	Surface
2/20	4,000	1,219	Asphalt

Statistics (2011)
- Aircraft operations: 1,040
- Based aircraft: 11
- Source: Federal Aviation Administration

Washington County Airport (FAA LID: 8WC) is a county-owned, public-use airport in Washington County, Missouri, United States. It is located three nautical miles (6 km) east of the central business district of Potosi, Missouri,.

== Facilities and aircraft ==
Washington County Airport covers an area of 120 acres (49 ha) at an elevation of 959 feet (292 m) above mean sea level. It has one runway designated 2/20 with an asphalt surface measuring 4,000 by 60 feet (1,219 x 18 m).

For the 12-month period ending June 30, 2011, the airport had 1,040 aircraft operations, an average of 86 per month: 96% general aviation, 3% air taxi, and 1% military. At that time there were 11 aircraft based at this airport: 82% single-engine and 18% ultralight.

== See also ==
- List of airports in Missouri
