= Sullivan Regional Airport =

Airport in Missouri, U.S.

- IATA: none; ICAO: KUUV; FAA LID: UUV

Summary
- Airport type: Public
- Owner: City of Sullivan
- Serves: Sullivan, Missouri
- Elevation AMSL: 933 ft (284 m)
- Coordinates: 38°14′00″N 091°09′51″W

Map
- Location of airport in Missouri UUV (the United States)

Runways
Direction	Length		Surface
Direction	ft	m	Surface
6/24	4,500	1,372	Concrete

Statistics (2010)
- Aircraft operations: 12,890
- Based aircraft: 21
- Source: Federal Aviation Administration

Sullivan Regional Airport (ICAO: KUUV, FAA LID: UUV) is a public use airport in Franklin County, Missouri, United States. It is owned by the city of Sullivan and located one nautical mile (2 km) north of its central business district. This airport is included in the National Plan of Integrated Airport Systems, which categorized it as a general aviation facility.

Although many U.S. airports use the same three-letter location identifier for the FAA and IATA, this airport is assigned UUV by the FAA but has no designation from the IATA.

== Facilities and aircraft ==
Sullivan Regional Airport covers an area of 332 acres (134 ha) at an elevation of 933 feet (284 m) above mean sea level. It has one runway designated 6/24 with a concrete surface measuring 4,500 by 75 feet (1,372 x 23 m).

For the 12-month period ending March 31, 2010, the airport had 12,890 aircraft operations, an average of 35 per day: 99% general aviation, <1% air taxi, and <1% military. At that time there were 21 aircraft based at this airport: 90.5% single-engine and 9.5% multi-engine.

== See also ==
- List of airports in Missouri
