= Lawrence Smith Memorial Airport =

- IATA: none; ICAO: KLRY; FAA LID: LRY

Summary
- Airport type: Public
- Owner: City of Harrisonville
- Serves: Harrisonville, Missouri
- Elevation AMSL: 915 ft / 279 m
- Coordinates: 38°36′37″N 094°20′37″W

Map
- Location of airport in Missouri LRY (the United States)

Runways
Direction	Length		Surface
Direction	ft	m	Surface
17/35	4,000	1,219	Asphalt

Statistics (2020)
- Aircraft operations: 12,000
- Based aircraft: 41
- Source: Federal Aviation Administration

Lawrence Smith Memorial Airport (ICAO: KLRY, FAA LID: LRY) is a city-owned, public-use airport located three nautical miles (6 km) south of the central business district of Harrisonville, a city in Cass County, Missouri, United States. It is included in the National Plan of Integrated Airport Systems for 2011–2015, which categorized it as a general aviation facility.

Although most U.S. airports use the same three-letter location identifier for the FAA and IATA, this airport is assigned LRY by the FAA but has no designation from the IATA.

== Facilities and aircraft ==
Lawrence Smith Memorial Airport covers an area of 126 acres (51 ha) at an elevation of 915 feet (279 m) above mean sea level. It has one runway designated 17/35 with an asphalt surface measuring 4,000 by 75 feet (1,219 x 23 m).

For the 12-month period ending December 31, 2020, the airport had 12,000 aircraft operations, an average of 33 per day: 99% general aviation, <1% military, and <1% air taxi. At that time there were 41 aircraft based at this airport: 36 single-engine, 4 multi-engine, and 1 helicopter.

== See also ==
- List of airports in Missouri
