= Jesse Viertel Memorial Airport =

Coordinates: 38°56′48″N 092°40′58″W

- IATA: none; ICAO: KVER; FAA LID: VER

Summary
- Airport type: Public
- Owner: City of Boonville
- Serves: Boonville, Missouri
- Location: Windsor Place, Missouri
- Elevation AMSL: 715 ft (218 m)
- Interactive map of Jesse Viertel Memorial Airport

Runways
Direction	Length		Surface
Direction	ft	m	Surface
18/36	4,000	1,219	Asphalt

Statistics (2006)
- Aircraft operations: 9,080
- Source: Federal Aviation Administration

Jesse Viertel Memorial Airport (ICAO: KVER, FAA LID: VER), also known as Jesse P. Viertel Airport, is a city-owned public-use airport located three miles (5 km) southeast of the central business district of Boonville, a city in Cooper County, Missouri, United States. It is home to the Daniel Boone Flying Club, which serves central Missouri.

Although most U.S. airports use the same three-letter location identifier for the FAA and IATA, Jesse Viertel Memorial Airport is assigned VER by the FAA but has no designation from the IATA (which assigned VER to Veracruz International Airport in Veracruz, Mexico).

"On November 30, 2014, about 0857 central standard time (CST), a Bellanca model 17-30A single-engine airplane, N6629V, was substantially damaged when it collided with terrain during landing approach to runway 36 at Jesse Viertel Memorial Airport (VER), Boonville, Missouri. The commercial pilot was fatally injured and his three passengers were seriously injured".

== Facilities and aircraft ==
Jesse Viertel Memorial Airport covers an area of 125 acres (51 ha) which contains one runway designated 18/36 with a 3,999 x 75 ft (1,219 x 23 m) asphalt pavement. For the 12-month period ending May 31, 2006, the airport had 9,080 aircraft operations, an average of 24 per day: 92% general aviation (8,380), 4% air taxi (400), 3% military (300).

== See also ==
- List of airports in Missouri
