= Salem Memorial Airport =

- IATA: none; ICAO: none; FAA LID: K33

Summary
- Airport type: Public
- Owner: City of Salem
- Serves: Salem, Missouri
- Elevation AMSL: 1,241 ft / 378 m
- Coordinates: 37°36′55″N 091°36′16″W

Map
- Location of airport in Missouri K33 (the United States)

Runways
Direction	Length		Surface
Direction	ft	m	Surface
17/35	2,998	914	Asphalt

Statistics (2012)
- Aircraft operations: 4,550
- Based aircraft: 9
- Source: Federal Aviation Administration

Salem Memorial Airport (FAA LID: K33) is a city-owned, public-use airport located four nautical miles (5 mi, 7 km) southwest of the central business district of Salem, a city in Dent County, Missouri, United States. It is included in the National Plan of Integrated Airport Systems for 2011–2015, which categorized it as a general aviation facility.

== Facilities and aircraft ==
Salem Memorial Airport covers an area of 86 acres (35 ha) at an elevation of 1,241 feet (378 m) above mean sea level. It has one runway designated 17/35 with an asphalt surface measuring 2,998 by 60 feet (914 x 18 m).

For the 12-month period ending December 31, 2012, the airport had 4,550 aircraft operations, an average of 12 per day: 99% general aviation and 1% military. At that time there were nine aircraft based at this airport: 44% single-engine, 33% helicopter, and 22% multi-engine.

== See also ==
- List of airports in Missouri
