= Richland Municipal Airport =

- IATA: none; ICAO: none; FAA LID: MO1

Summary
- Airport type: Public
- Owner: City of Richland
- Serves: Richland, Missouri
- Elevation AMSL: 1,110 ft / 338 m
- Coordinates: 37°52′30″N 092°24′29″W
- Interactive map of Richland Municipal Airport

Runways
| Direction | Length | | Surface |
| Direction | ft | m | Surface |
|---|---|---|---|
| 14/32 | 3,000 | 914 | Asphalt |

Statistics (2007)
- Aircraft operations: 520
- Source: Federal Aviation Administration

Richland Municipal Airport (FAA LID: MO1) is a city-owned, public-use airport located one mile (2 km) north of the central business district of Richland, a city in Pulaski County, Missouri, United States.

== Facilities and aircraft ==
Richland Municipal Airport covers an area of 140 acres (57 ha) and has one runway designated 14/32 with a 3,000 x 60 ft (914 x 18 m) asphalt surface. For the 12-month period ending June 13, 2007, the airport had 520 aircraft operations, an average of 43 per month: 90% general aviation and 10% military.

== See also ==
- List of airports in Missouri
