= West Plains Regional Airport =

Airport in Missouri, United States

- IATA: none; ICAO: KUNO; FAA LID: UNO

Summary
- Airport type: Public
- Owner: City of West Plains
- Serves: West Plains, Missouri
- Elevation AMSL: 1,228 ft (374 m)
- Coordinates: 36°52′42″N 091°54′10″W
- Website: WestPlains.net/...

Map
- Location of airport in Missouri

Runways
Direction	Length		Surface
Direction	ft	m	Surface
18/36	5,101	1,555	Asphalt

Statistics (2019)
- Aircraft operations: 2,772
- Based aircraft: 25
- Source: Federal Aviation Administration

West Plains Regional Airport (ICAO: KUNO, FAA LID: UNO) is a city-owned, public-use airport located 10 nautical miles (12 mi; 19 km) northwest of the central business district of West Plains, a city in Howell County, Missouri, United States. Previously known as West Plains Municipal Airport, it is included in the National Plan of Integrated Airport Systems for 2011–2015, where it is categorized as a general aviation facility.

Although many U.S. airports share the same three-letter location identifier for the FAA and IATA, West Plains Regional Airport is assigned UNO by the FAA but has no designation from the IATA.

== Facilities and aircraft ==
West Plains Regional Airport covers an area of 250 acres (100 ha) at an elevation of 1,228 feet (374 m) above mean sea level. The airport has one runway designated 18/36, with an asphalt surface measuring 5,101 by 75 feet (1,555 by 23 m).

For the 12-month period ending December 31, 2019, the airport recorded 2,772 aircraft operations, averaging 53 per week. Of these operations, 91% were general aviation, 9% were air taxi, and less than 1% were military. At that time, the airport was home to 25 aircraft, all of which were single-engine.

== See also ==
- List of airports in Missouri
