= St. Charles County Smartt Airport =

St. Charles County Smartt Airport Smartt Field
- IATA: none; ICAO: KSET; FAA LID: SET

Summary
- Airport type: Public
- Owner: St. Charles County
- Serves: St. Charles, Missouri
- Elevation AMSL: 437 ft (133 m)
- Coordinates: 38°55′47″N 090°25′48″W

Map
- Location of airport in Missouri / United States SET (the United States)

Runways
Direction	Length		Surface
Direction	ft	m	Surface
18/36	3,800	1,158	Asphalt
9/27	3,000	914	Asphalt

Statistics (2010)
- Aircraft operations: 55,200
- Based aircraft: 92
- Source: Federal Aviation Administration

St. Charles County Smartt Airport, also known as Smartt Field, is a county-owned, public-use airport in St. Charles County, Missouri, United States. It is located nine nautical miles (17 km) northeast of the central business district of the City of St. Charles. This facility is included in the National Plan of Integrated Airport Systems, which categorized it as a general aviation reliever airport.

Although many U.S. airports use the same three-letter location identifier for the FAA and IATA, this airport is assigned SET by the FAA but has no designation from the IATA.

== History ==
In January 1941, the Navy at St. Louis's Lambert Field began full primary training. Since Lambert was a very busy airport, also being used by the Army and the manufacturers, inexperienced student pilots were not allowed to solo. The Navy traveled 11 miles north and eventually purchased several hundred acres from Ruth Neubeiser. An initial $250,000 was spent building a 2,000 ft octagonal mat, a hangar, and barracks. Navy flight training students were organized into two units—the port and starboard wings. In the morning, one wing would fly while the other attended classes and other activities. In the afternoon, it was the opposite. Students were bused to and from Neubeiser for their solos. A considerable number of aircraft were kept at Neubeiser as well as ground crewmen who serviced the aircraft and lived there. The facility was later renamed Smartt Field in honor of Ensign Joseph Smartt, who was killed in the Japanese attack on NAS Kaneohe Bay, Hawaii, on December 7, 1941.

== Facilities and aircraft ==
St. Charles County Smartt Airport covers an area of 312 acres (126 ha) at an elevation of 437 feet (133 m) above mean sea level. It has two runways with asphalt surfaces: 18/36 is 3,800 by 75 feet (1,158 x 23 m) and 9/27 is 2,000 by 75 feet (610 x 23 m).

For the 12-month period ending March 31, 2010, the airport had 55,200 aircraft operations, an average of 151 per day: 99.8% general aviation and 0.2% air taxi. At that time there were 92 aircraft based at this airport: 80% single-engine, 9% multi-engine, 7% ultralight, and 4% helicopter.

== See also ==
- List of airports in Missouri
