= Skyhaven Airport (Missouri) =

Coordinates: 38°47′03″N 093°48′10″W

- IATA: none; ICAO: KRCM; FAA LID: RCM

Summary
- Airport type: Public
- Owner: University of Central Missouri
- Serves: Warrensburg, Missouri
- Elevation AMSL: 798 ft (243 m)
- Interactive map of Skyhaven Airport

Runways
Direction	Length		Surface
Direction	ft	m	Surface
14/32	2,802	854	Asphalt
01/19	4,206	1,282	Concrete

Statistics (2019)
- Aircraft operations: 29,725
- Based aircraft: 54
- Source: Federal Aviation Administration

Skyhaven Airport (ICAO: KRCM, FAA LID: RCM) is a public-use airport located 3 mi (4.8 km) northwest of the central business district of Warrensburg, a city in Johnson County, Missouri, United States. It is owned by the University of Central Missouri.

Although most U.S. airports use the same three-letter location identifier for the FAA and IATA, Skyhaven Airport is assigned RCM by the FAA but has no designation from the IATA (which assigned RCM to Richmond Airport in Richmond, Queensland, Australia).

== Facilities and aircraft ==
Skyhaven Airport covers an area of 402 acres (163 ha) which contains two asphalt paved runways: 01/19 measuring 4,206 ft × 75 ft (1,282 m × 23 m) (concrete) and 14/32 measuring 2,802 ft × 60 ft (854 m × 18 m) (asphalt).

For the 12-month period ending December 31, 2019, the airport had 29,725 aircraft operations, an average of 81 per day: 99% general aviation, 1% military, and <1% air taxi. At that time there were 54 aircraft based at this airport: 50 single-engine, 3 multi-engine and 1 glider.

== See also ==
- List of airports in Missouri
