= Warsaw Municipal Airport (Missouri) =

- IATA: none; ICAO: KRAW; FAA LID: RAW

Summary
- Airport type: Public
- Owner: City of Warsaw
- Serves: Warsaw, Missouri
- Elevation AMSL: 936 ft / 285 m
- Coordinates: 38°20′49″N 093°20′44″W
- Interactive map of Warsaw Municipal Airport

Runways
Direction	Length		Surface
Direction	ft	m	Surface
18/36	4,000	1,219	Concrete

Statistics (2022)
- Aircraft operations (year ending 12/2/2022): 10,110
- Based aircraft: 20
- Source: Federal Aviation Administration

Warsaw Municipal Airport (ICAO: KRAW, FAA LID: RAW) is a city-owned public-use airport located six miles (10 km) north of the central business district of Warsaw, a city in Benton County, Missouri, United States.

Although most U.S. airports use the same three-letter location identifier for the FAA and IATA, Warsaw Municipal Airport is assigned RAW by the FAA but has no designation from the IATA (which assigned RAW to Arawa, Papua New Guinea).

== Facilities and aircraft ==
Warsaw Municipal Airport covers an area of 168 acres (68 ha) and has one runway designated 18/36 with a 4,000 x 75 ft (1,219 x 23 m) concrete surface.

For the 12-month period ending December 2, 2022, the airport had 10,110 aircraft operations, an average of 28 per day: 98% general aviation, 1% military and <1% air taxi. At that time, there were 20 aircraft based at this airport: 18 single-engine, 1 multi-engine, and 1 glider.

== See also ==
- List of airports in Missouri
