= Smith Field (Arkansas) =

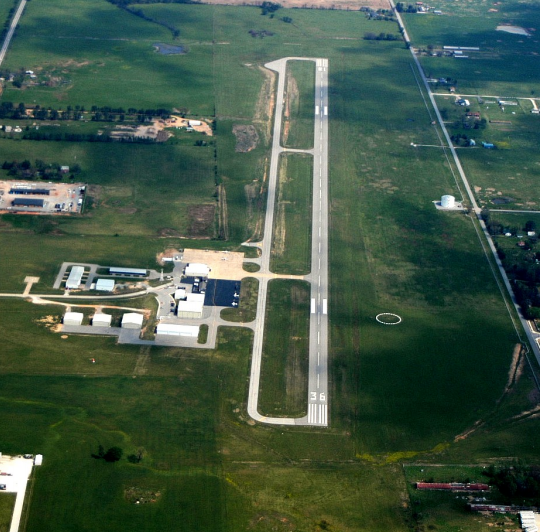
- IATA: SLG; ICAO: KSLG; FAA LID: SLG

Summary
- Airport type: Public
- Owner: City of Siloam Springs
- Serves: Siloam Springs, Arkansas
- Elevation AMSL: 1,191 ft / 363 m
- Coordinates: 36°11′31″N 094°29′24″W
- Interactive map of Smith Field

Runways
Direction	Length		Surface
Direction	ft	m	Surface
18/36	4,997	1,523	Asphalt

Statistics (2009)
- Aircraft operations: 35,050
- Based aircraft: 42
- Source: Federal Aviation Administration

Smith Field (IATA: SLG, ICAO: KSLG, FAA LID: SLG) is a city-owned, public-use airport located three nautical miles (6 km) northeast of the central business district of Siloam Springs, a city in Benton County, Arkansas, United States. According to the FAA's National Plan of Integrated Airport Systems for 2009–2013, it is categorized as a general aviation airport.

== Facilities and aircraft ==
Smith Field covers an area of 270 acres (110 ha) at an elevation of 1,191 feet (363 m) above mean sea level. It has one runway designated 18/36 with an asphalt surface measuring 4,997 by 75 feet (1,523 x 23 m).

For the 12-month period ending February 28, 2021, the airport had 24,050 aircraft operations, an average of 66 per day: 99.8% general aviation and 0.2% military. At that time there were 18 aircraft based at this airport: 83% single-engine, 11% multi-engine, and 6% jet.

== See also ==
- List of airports in Arkansas
