= List of airports in Colorado =

Coordinates: 38.9972°N 105.5478°W

The location of the state of Colorado in the United States.

This is a list of airports in the U.S. state of Colorado, grouped by type and sorted by location. It contains all public-use and military airports in the state. Some private-use and former airports may be included where notable, such as airports that were previously public-use, those with commercial enplanements recorded by the FAA, or airports assigned an IATA airport code.

== Airports ==
This list contains the following information:

- **City served** – The city generally associated with the airport, as per the airport's master record with the Federal Aviation Administration. This is not always the actual location since some airports are located in smaller towns outside of the city they serve. It is not meant to be a complete list of cities served, which can be found in or added to each airport's Wikipedia article.
- **FAA** – The location identifier assigned by the Federal Aviation Administration (FAA). These are linked to each airport's page at the Colorado Department of Transportation.
- **IATA** – The airport code assigned by the International Air Transport Association (IATA). Those that do not match the FAA code are shown in bold.
- **ICAO** – The location indicator assigned by the International Civil Aviation Organization (ICAO).
- **Airport name** – The official airport name. Those shown in **bold** indicate the airport has scheduled passenger service on commercial airlines.
- **Role** – One of four FAA airport categories, as per the 2023–2027 National Plan of Integrated Airport Systems (NPIAS) report released September 2022:
  - P-s: Commercial service – primary are publicly owned airports that receive scheduled passenger service and have more than 10,000 passenger boardings (enplanements) each year. Each primary airport is sub-classified by the FAA as one of the following four "hub" types (s):
    - L: Large hub that accounts for at least 1% of total U.S. passenger enplanements.
    - M: Medium hub that accounts for between 0.25% and 1% of total U.S. passenger enplanements.
    - S: Small hub that accounts for between 0.05% and 0.25% of total U.S. passenger enplanements.
    - N: Nonhub that accounts for less than 0.05% of total U.S. passenger enplanements, but more than 10,000 annual enplanements.
  - CS: Commercial service – nonprimary are publicly owned airports that receive scheduled passenger service and have at least 2,500 passenger boardings each year.
  - R: Reliever airports are designated by the FAA to relieve congestion at a large commercial service airport and to provide more general aviation access to the overall community.
  - GA: General aviation airports are the largest single group of airports in the U.S. airport system. They are public-use airports that do not have scheduled service or have scheduled service with less than 2,500 passenger boardings each year.
- **Enplanements** – The number of enplanements (commercial passenger boardings) that occurred at the airport in calendar year 2024, as per FAA records released 2025.

City served	FAA	IATA	ICAO	Airport name	Role	Enplanements (2024)
				**Commercial service – primary airports**		
Alamosa	ALS	ALS	KALS	**San Luis Valley Regional Airport** (Bergman Field)	P-N	12,232
Aspen	ASE	ASE	KASE	**Aspen/Pitkin County Airport** (Sardy Field)	P-N	349,781
Colorado Springs	COS	COS	KCOS	**City of Colorado Springs Municipal Airport**	P-S	1,248,261
Denver	DEN	DEN	KDEN	**Denver International Airport**	P-L	40,012,895
Durango	DRO	DRO	KDRO	**Durango–La Plata County Airport**	P-N	250,640
Eagle/Vail	EGE	EGE	KEGE	**Eagle County Regional Airport**	P-N	282,849
Grand Junction	GJT	GJT	KGJT	**Grand Junction Regional Airport** (Walker Field)	P-N	270,935
Gunnison	GUC	GUC	KGUC	**Gunnison–Crested Butte Regional Airport**	P-N	58,804
Hayden	HDN	HDN	KHDN	**Yampa Valley Airport** (Yampa Valley Regional)	P-N	226,830
Montrose	MTJ	MTJ	KMTJ	**Montrose Regional Airport**	P-N	264,973
				**Commercial service – nonprimary airports**		
Cortez	CEZ	CEZ	KCEZ	**Cortez Municipal Airport**	CS	8,820
Fort Collins/Loveland	FNL	FNL	KFNL	Northern Colorado Regional Airport	CS	2,867
Pueblo	PUB	PUB	KPUB	**Pueblo Memorial Airport**	CS	1,397
Telluride	TEX	TEX	KTEX	**Telluride Regional Airport**	CS	10,721
				**Reliever airports**		
Aurora (Denver)	CFO		KCFO	Colorado Air and Space Port (was Front Range)	R	4
Broomfield (Denver)	BJC	BJC	KBJC	**Rocky Mountain Metropolitan Airport** (was Jefferson Co.)	R	25,141
Centennial (Denver)	APA	APA	KAPA	**Centennial Airport**	R	1,852
Colorado Springs	FLY		KFLY	Meadow Lake Airport (was FAA: 00V)	R	1
				**General aviation airports**		
Akron	AKO	AKO	KAKO	Colorado Plains Regional Airport	GA	0
Boulder	BDU	**WBU**	KBDU	Boulder Municipal Airport	GA	4
Buena Vista	AEJ		KAEJ	Central Colorado Regional Airport	GA	0
Burlington	ITR		KITR	Kit Carson County Airport	GA	0
Cañon City	1V6	**CNE**		Fremont County Airport	GA	0
Craig	CAG	**CIG**	KCAG	Craig-Moffat Airport (Craig-Moffat County Airport)	GA	0
Delta	AJZ		KAJZ	Blake Field	GA	0
Erie	EIK		KEIK	Erie Municipal Airport	GA	0
Fort Morgan	FMM		KFMM	Fort Morgan Municipal Airport	GA	0
Granby	GNB		KGNB	Granby-Grand County Airport	GA	0
Greeley	GXY	GXY	KGXY	Greeley-Weld County Airport	GA	0
Holyoke	HEQ		KHEQ	Holyoke Airport (Holyoke Municipal Airport)	GA	1
Kremmling	20V			McElroy Airfield (McElroy Field)	GA	1
La Junta	LHX		KLHX	La Junta Municipal Airport	GA	0
Lamar	LAA	LAA	KLAA	Southeast Colorado Regional Airport	GA	0
Leadville	LXV	LXV	KLXV	Lake County Airport (Leadville Airport)	GA	0
Limon	LIC	LIC	KLIC	Limon Municipal Airport	GA	0
Longmont	LMO		KLMO	Vance Brand Airport (was AMR/KAMR)	GA	0
Meeker	EEO		KEEO	Meeker Coulter Field	GA	0
Monte Vista	MVI		KMVI	Monte Vista Municipal Airport	GA	0
Nucla	AIB		KAIB	Hopkins Field	GA	0
Pagosa Springs	PSO	**PGO**	KPSO	Stevens Field	GA	13
Rangely	4V0	**RNG**		Rangely Airport	GA	0
Rifle	RIL	RIL	KRIL	Rifle Garfield County Regional Airport	GA	218
Salida	ANK	**SLT**	KANK	Harriet Alexander Field	GA	0
Steamboat Springs	SBS	SBS	KSBS	Steamboat Springs Airport (Bob Adams Field)	GA	7
Sterling	STK	STK	KSTK	Sterling Municipal Airport	GA	0
Trinidad	TAD	TAD	KTAD	Perry Stokes Airport	GA	0
Walsenburg	4V1			Spanish Peaks Airfield	GA	0
Wray	2V5			Wray Municipal Airport	GA	0
Yuma	2V6			Yuma Municipal Airport	GA	0
				**Other public-use airports** (not listed in NPIAS)		
Akron	5V6			Gebauer Airport		
Blanca	05V			Blanca Airport		
Brush	7V5			Brush Municipal Airport		
Calhan	5V4			Calhan Airport		
Center	1V8			Leach Airport		
Crawford	99V			Crawford Airport		
Creede	C24			Mineral County Memorial Airport		4
Del Norte	RCV		KRCV	Astronaut Kent Rominger Airport (Del Norte Muni. & Co.)		
Delta	D17			Westwinds Airport (Hawkins Field)		
Dove Creek	8V6			Dove Creek Airport		
Durango	00C	**AMK**		Animas Air Park		
Eads	9V7			Eads Municipal Airport		
Ellicott	CO4			Colorado Springs East Airport		
Glenwood Springs	GWS	GWS	KGWS	Glenwood Springs Municipal Airport		
Greeley	11V			Easton/Valley View Airport		
Haxtun	17V			Haxtun Municipal Airport		
Holly	K08			Holly Airport		
Hudson	18V			Platte Valley Airpark		
Julesburg	7V8			Julesburg Municipal Airport		
La Veta	07V			Cuchara Valley Airport at La Veta		
Las Animas	7V9			City of Las Animas - Bent County Airport		
Ordway	C01			Lake Meredith Seaplane Base		
Paonia	7V2	WPO		North Fork Valley Airport		
Rangely	13R			Kenney Reservoir Seaplane Base		
Saguache	04V			Saguache Municipal Airport		
Springfield	8V7			Springfield Municipal Airport		
Walden	33V			Walden-Jackson County Airport		
Westcliffe	C08			Silver West Airport		
				**Other military airports**		
Aurora	BKF	BKF	KBKF	Buckley Space Force Base		
Colorado Springs	AFF	AFF	KAFF	United States Air Force Academy		
Fort Carson	FCS	FCS	KFCS	Butts Army Airfield (Fort Carson)		
				**Notable private-use airports**		
Beaver Creek	4CO9			Beaver Creek Heliport		5
Crested Butte	0CO2	**CSE**		Buckhorn Ranch Airport		
Mack	10CO			Mack Mesa Airport		
				**Notable former airports**		
Avon	~~WHR~~			Avon STOLPort (closed between 1986 and 1994)		
Breckenridge				Breckenridge STOLport (closed between 1998 and 2002)		
Denver		~~DEN~~	~~KDEN~~	Stapleton International Airport (replaced by Denver Intl)		
Fort Collins	~~3V5~~			Fort Collins Downtown Airport (closed Nov. 1, 2006)		

== See also ==
- Essential Air Service
- Bibliography of Colorado
- Geography of Colorado
- History of Colorado
- Index of Colorado-related articles
- List of Colorado-related lists
- Outline of Colorado
