= KLAA =

KLAA may refer to:

- The ICAO airport code for Lamar Municipal Airport (Colorado) in Lamar, Colorado
- KLAA (AM), a radio station (830 AM) licensed to the city of Orange, California
- KLAA-FM, a radio station (103.5 FM) licensed to Tioga, Louisiana
- A callsign formerly used by KARD (TV), licensed to Monroe, Louisiana, from October 1974 until December 1982
- A D1 high school athletic conference in Metro Detroit
