= KBUD =

KBUD may refer to:

- KBUD (FM), a defunct radio station (93.7 FM) formerly licensed to serve Deer Trail, Colorado, United States
- KXJJ), a radio station (1570 AM) licensed to serve Loveland, Colorado, which held the call sign KBUD in 2016
- KKCL (AM), a radio station (1550 AM) licensed to serve Golden, Colorado, which held the call sign KBUD from 2015 to 2016
- WKFF, a radio station (102.1 FM) licensed to serve Sardis, Mississippi, United States, which held the call sign KBUD from 2001 to 2015
- KBZD, a radio station (99.7 FM) licensed to serve Amarillo, Texas, United States, which held the call sign KBUD from 1994 to 1995
- KLVQ, a radio station (1410 AM) licensed to serve Athens, Texas, which held the call sign KBUD until 1988
