= 1V5 =

1V5 may refer to:

- 1V5 (voltage), a non-standard designation for 1.5 V following the RKM code notation per IEC 62/IEC 60062
- 1V5 (airport), a former designation for the Boulder Municipal Airport in the USA
