= Yuma Airport =

Yuma Airport may refer to:

- Yuma International Airport in Yuma, Arizona, United States (FAA: NYL)
- Yuma Municipal Airport in Yuma, Colorado, United States (FAA: 2V6)
