= KPSO =

KPSO may refer to:

- The ICAO airport code for Stevens Field airport in Archuleta County, Colorado, United States
- KPSO-FM, a radio station (106.3 FM) licensed to Falfurrias, Texas, United States
