= KITR =

KITR may refer to:

- Kit Carson County Airport
- KIT receptor, a membrane-bound receptor for mast/stem cell growth factor
