= Limon Municipal Airport =

Airport in Limon, Colorado, United States

- IATA: LIC; ICAO: KLIC; FAA LID: LIC

Summary
- Airport type: Public
- Serves: Limon, Colorado, US
- Elevation AMSL: 5,374.4 ft (1,638.1 m)
- Coordinates: 39.274°N 103.666°W
- Interactive map of Limon Municipal Airport

Runways
Direction	Length		Surface
Direction	ft	m	Surface
16/34	4,700	1,433	Concrete
- Sources: FAA

Limon Municipal Airport (IATA: LIC, ICAO: KLIC, FAA LID: LIC) is a city-owned, public-use airport located one nautical mile (1.6 km) northeast of the central business district of Limon, in Lincoln County, Colorado, United States. It is included in the National Plan of Integrated Airport Systems for 2011–2015, which categorized it as a general aviation facility.

== Incidents ==
On the morning of August 10, 2020, winds from a heat burst damaged structures at the airport and damaged a parked aircraft.

== See also ==
- List of airports in Colorado
