= Leach Airport =

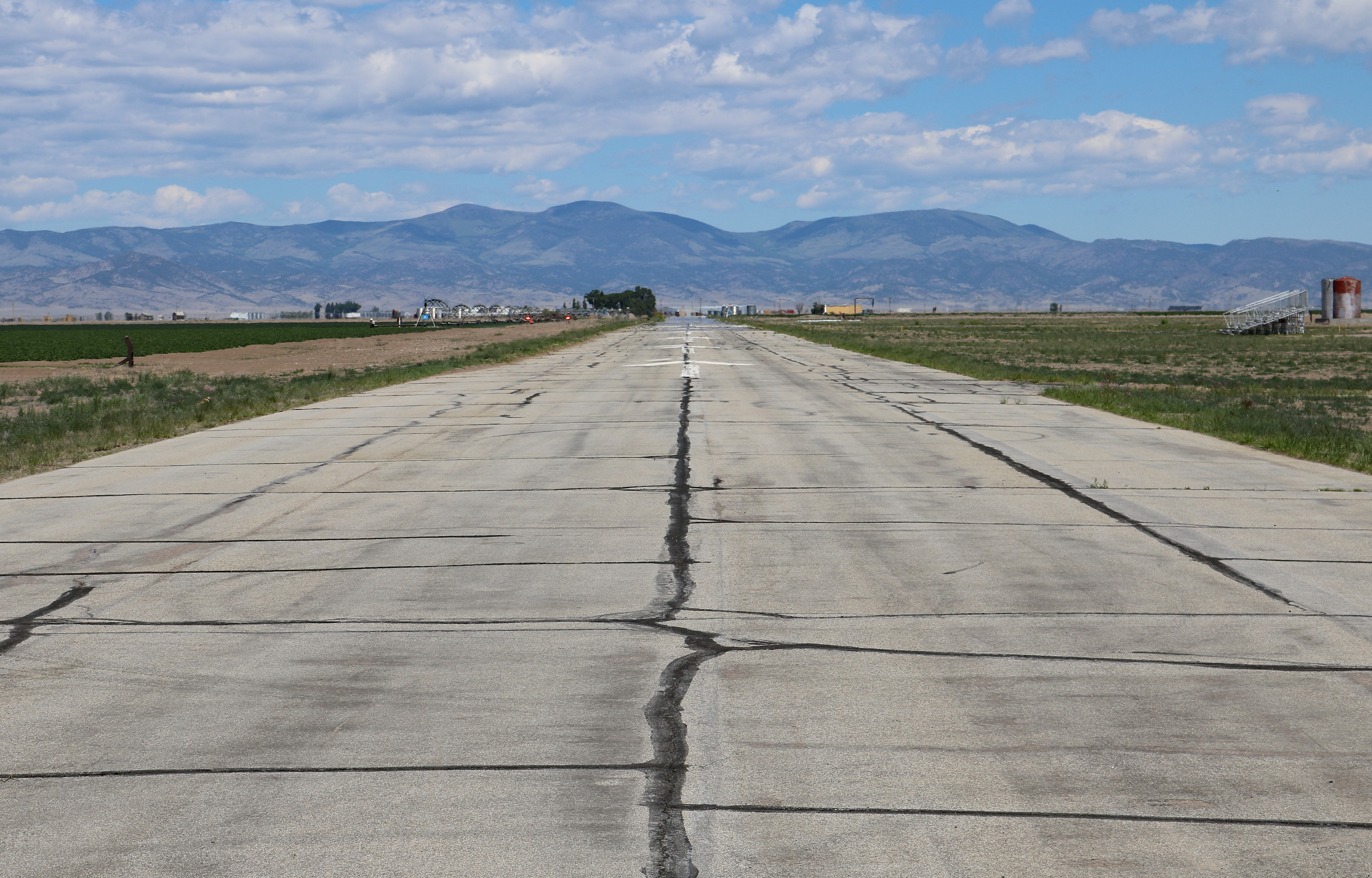
- Looking northwest along runway 12/30
- IATA: none; ICAO: none; FAA LID: 1V8

Summary
- Airport type: Public
- Owner: County of Saguache
- Serves: Center, Colorado
- Elevation AMSL: 7,598 ft / 2,316 m
- Coordinates: 37°47′06″N 106°02′49″W

Map
- Location of airport in Colorado

Runways
Direction	Length		Surface
Direction	ft	m	Surface
12/30	7,000	2,134	Asphalt

Statistics (2009)
- Aircraft operations: 1,700
- Based aircraft: 10
- Source: Federal Aviation Administration

Leach Airport (FAA LID: 1V8) is a county-owned, public-use airport in Saguache County, Colorado, United States. It is located four nautical miles (5 mi, 7 km) northeast of the central business district of Center, Colorado, at County Road 53 & County Road C.

== Facilities and aircraft ==
Leach Airport covers an area of 66 acres (27 ha) at an elevation of 7,598 feet (2,316 m) above mean sea level. It has one runway designated 12/30 with an asphalt surface measuring 7,000 by 50 feet (2,134 x 15 m).

For the 12-month period ending September 3, 2009, the airport had 1,700 general aviation aircraft operations, an average of 141 per month. At that time there were 10 aircraft based at this airport: 90% single-engine and 10% ultralight.

== Data ==
=== Navigation ===
- VOR 113.9 (ALAMOSA) .... GPS no .... ILS no

=== Runway ===
- Lights LIRL .... VGSI none .... App Lgts none .... Taxiway unk
- RWY 12 has 110’ displaced threshold
- RWY 30 has 1345’ displaced threshold
- Agricultural operations May–September
- 60 ft. powerlines 200 ft. from RWY 30 end on both sides of centerline
- Itinerant ops: 200
- Local ops: 1,500

=== Communication ===
- CTAF/UNICOM 122.8 .... Lights 122.8 and ? clicks

=== Services ===
- TSNT Storage hangars and tiedowns
- Fuel 100LL
- Transportation: courtesy car
- Other services: aerial spraying

== See also ==
- List of airports in Colorado
