= Sterling Municipal Airport =

Airport in Colorado, United States

- IATA: STK; ICAO: KSTK; FAA LID: STK

Summary
- Airport type: Public
- Owner: City of Sterling
- Serves: Sterling, Colorado
- Elevation AMSL: 4,038 ft / 1,231 m
- Coordinates: 40°36′51″N 103°15′51″W

Map
- Location of airport in Colorado

Runways
Direction	Length		Surface
Direction	ft	m	Surface
15/33	5,201	1,585	Asphalt
04/22	2,809	856	Turf

Statistics (2019)
- Aircraft operations: 2,414
- Based aircraft: 24
- Source: Federal Aviation Administration

Sterling Municipal Airport (IATA: STK, ICAO: KSTK, FAA LID: STK), also known as Crosson Field, is a public use airport located 3.5 nautical miles (6.5 km) west of Sterling, a city in Logan County, Colorado, United States. It is owned by the City of Sterling.

== Facilities and aircraft ==
According to the "FAA Airport Form 5010 for STK" (PDF). FAA. , Sterling Municipal Airport covers an area of 340 acres (140 ha) at an elevation of 4,038 feet (1,231 m) above mean sea level. The longest runway has asphalt surface: 15/33 is 5,201 by 75 ft (1,585 by 23 m). The second runway has turf surface: 10/28 is 2,809 by 150 ft (856 by 46 m).

According to the FAA, for the 12-month period ending December 31, 2019, the airport had 2,414 aircraft operations: 93.4% general aviation, 4.8% air taxi, and 1.8% military. At that time there were 24 aircraft based at this airport: 19 (79%) single-engine, 3 (13%) multi-engine, 1 (4%) jet, and 1 (4%) helicopter.

== See also ==
- List of airports in Colorado
