= Belle Turnbull =

American writer

- Born: December 9, 1881; Hamilton, New York, US
- Died: November 21, 1970 (aged 88); Denver, Colorado, US

Belle Turnbull (December 9, 1881 – November 21, 1970) was an American poet from Colorado. In 1938, Turnbull received the Harriet Monroe Memorial Prize from Poetry Magazine. She published two novels, one in verse (Goldboat, 1940) and one in prose (The Far Side of the Hill, 1953), as well as two volumes of poetry, Tenmile Range in 1957 and Trails in 1968.

== Biography ==
Turnbull was born in Hamilton, New York on December 9, 1881. At the age of 9, her family moved to Colorado Springs, Colorado because of her father's health. Her father, George Butler Turnbull, became the principal of Colorado Springs High School. Belle Turnbull graduated from Vassar College in 1904. As of 1908, Turnbull was the corresponding secretary of the Kappa Sigma Society of Elmira College. (Note: Turnbull was a member of Kappa Sigma in 1907. See - "Kappa Sigma Dines Phi Mu". May 18, 1907 – via Newspapers.com.) Turnbull passed the board of school examiners exam in Buffalo, New York in 1908, thereby qualifying her to teach English in the area. After a stint teaching Buffalo, New York 1909, Turnbull returned to Colorado Springs, Colorado in 1910 to teach English at Colorado Springs High School. By 1932, Turnbull had become the head of the English department at the school. It is noteworthy that Turnbull began her writing career while teaching at the high school.

By the 1930s Turnbull had poems published in prestigious newspapers and journals including the Saturday Review of Literature, The New York Times (19 November 1937) and Poetry.

In 1937, Turnbull retired from teaching moved to Frisco, Colorado with Helen Rich, novelist, journalist and former society editor for the Colorado Springs Gazette-Telegraph. In 1939 they moved to a log cabin on French Street in Breckenridge, Colorado, where they remained for the rest of their lives, eventually coming to be known as "the ladies of French Street". During World War II, Turnbull worked as a clerk typist for the War Price and Rationing Board in Breckenridge. She resigned in 1944 to devote all of her time to writing.

Though she published a novel as well as volumes of verse, Turnbull's most prominent publications were in verse. Goldboat (Houghton, Mifflin, 1940) is a verse narrative of a manager who came to Colorado to build a dredge for mining gold from a lake bottom. The Tenmile Range (Prairie Press of Iowa City, 1957) is a collection of poems including her award-winning series "At That Point Mr. Probus". Both works focused on the lives of mountain folk, the harsh reality of living among the mountains they loved, and the sickness that the hunt for gold could become among prospectors. Tenmile was featured in a positive New York Times review in 1957 written by William Meredith.

Belle Turnbull was a noted Colorado writer who lived, wholeheartedly, in Breckenridge, and who published poems that received national recognition. Because she wrote so memorably about the state’s mountain landscape, and also because her poems crossed the boundaries of class and occupation with agility and respect, her writings constitute a treasure in our heritage.

— Patty Limerick, Colorado State Historian, "Forgetting, then remembering, Colorado’s great Belle Turnbull", Denver Post (November 17, 2017)

Turnbull died on Friday November 21, 1970 at the age of 88 while residing in the Juliet Temple Home nursing home in Denver, Colorado; she was cremated the day after her death. Her long time companion, Helen Rich, died the following year.

== Works ==
- Goldboat, a novel in verse, "the story of a gold dredger bent on romance but engulfed in chicanery". The novel was published by Houghton Mifflin.
- The Far Side of the Hill, a novel in prose, described in one review as a "reverse Cinderella story".
- Poems included in The Tenmile Range
  - "In Those Rude Airs", about a midwife in Summit County, Colorado
- "Incident of the Hawk-Watch" published in Poetry.
  To one who waited thirsty
  At her door
  They whispered she had died
  The night before.
  But though their hawk-eyes swept
  His self-control,
  Exploring for the havoc
  Of his soul,
  They got no sign until
  He turned to go
  And found her lovely footprint
  In the snow.

A selection of Turnbull's works was republished as Belle Turnbull: Voice of the Mountains, an anthology, by Karen Fischer and Robert D. McCracken (1996). A selection of her papers have been archived in the Denver Public Library. (Note: Archive location: "The Belle Turnbull Papers".)
