= Edwin Carter =

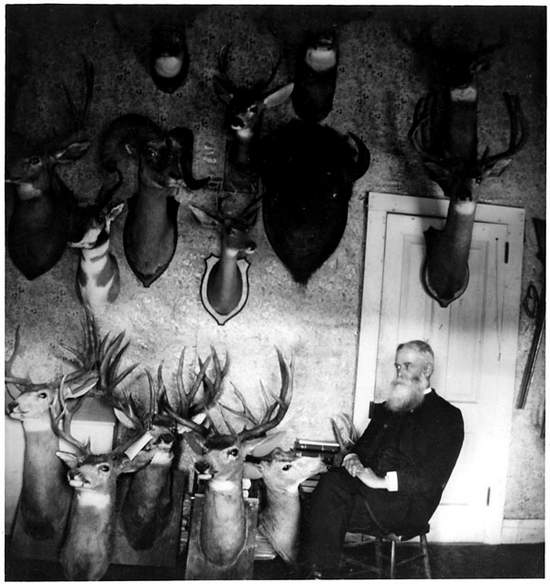
Edwin Carter in his Log Cabin Naturalist Museum (Circa 1875)

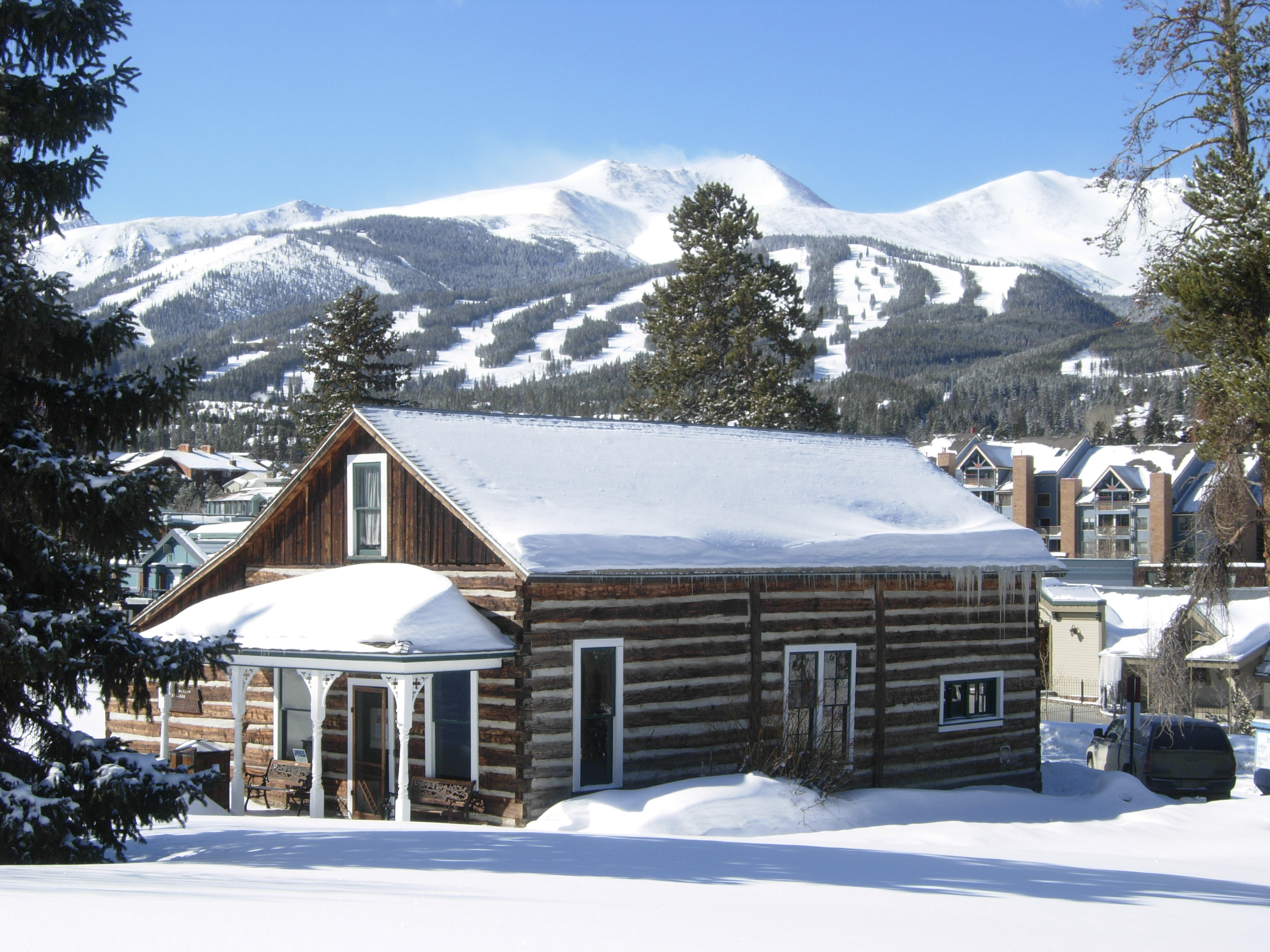
Edwin Carter Log Cabin Naturalist Museum (Circa 1875) Edwin Carter in Breckenridge, Colorado

Edwin Carter was a naturalist, born in upstate New York around 1830. Carter lived in the Breckenridge, Colorado area from 1860 to 1900. He originally was a placer miner and was fairly successful, but when he observed the destruction of the environment caused by hydraulic mining, he decided to collect animal and bird specimens for display before they were all gone. In 1875, he built a log cabin museum with a 12-foot-high ceiling to house his collection of over 3,000 specimens.

Edwin was somewhat of an enigma as he never married or had any descendants and only 5 photos of him were found, one being his closed casket. Virtually no correspondence, news articles, or diaries exist to give us much insight into what made him decide to be a naturalist instead of a miner.

His Masonic connections were notable as he was honored as a first private citizen of Colorado and first lay in state at the state capitol in Denver and again in Breckenridge, both events orchestrated by his fellow Free Masons. Most of the United States' earlier Presidents, scientists and leading citizens were active in the Masonic organization in those days.

== Legacy ==
The Denver Museum of Nature and Science owes its original start to his collection which was purchased after his death in 1900. The original log cabin is still in excellent shape after 125+ years. As part of Breckenridge's 150th celebration it has been recently (2009) renovated and modernized by Exhibit Design Associates for the Breckenridge Heritage Alliance and includes some original examples of his taxidermy work. In addition it has numerous interactive learning exhibits and a small LCD theater room with a short film on his life history. This creative film was an official selection of the 2009 Breckenridge Festival of Film.
