= Vance Brand Airport =

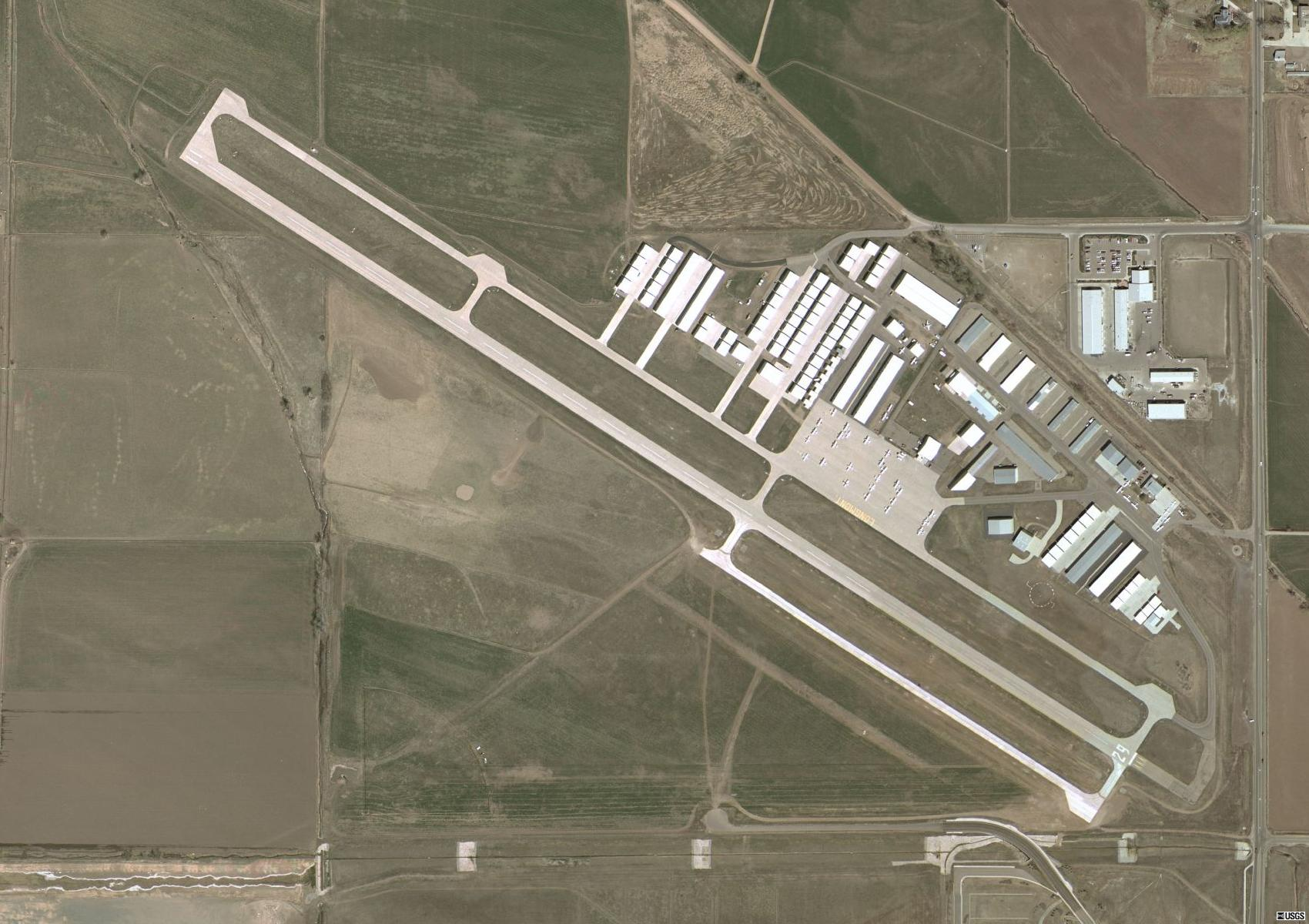
- USGS aerial image, 2002
- IATA: none; ICAO: KLMO; FAA LID: LMO

Summary
- Airport type: Public
- Owner: City of Longmont
- Serves: Longmont, Colorado
- Elevation AMSL: 5,055 ft / 1,541 m
- Coordinates: 40°09′51″N 105°09′49″W
- Website: longmontcolorado.gov/airport
- Interactive map of Vance Brand Airport

Runways
Direction	Length		Surface
Direction	ft	m	Surface
11/29	4,800	1,463	Concrete

Statistics (2008)
- Aircraft operations: 99,990
- Based aircraft: 281
- Source: Federal Aviation Administration

Vance Brand Airport (ICAO: KLMO, FAA LID: LMO, formerly AMR) is a city-owned public-use airport located three nautical miles (6 km) southwest of the central business district of Longmont, in Boulder County, Colorado, United States. The Airport is named after former NASA astronaut Vance Brand.

Although many U.S. airports use the same three-letter location identifier for the FAA and IATA, this facility is assigned LMO by the FAA but has no designation from the IATA (which assigned LMO to RAF Lossiemouth in Lossiemouth, Scotland).

== Facilities and aircraft ==
Vance Brand Airport covers an area of 261 acres (106 ha) at an elevation of 5,055 feet (1,541 m) above mean sea level. It has one runway designated 11/29 with a concrete surface measuring 4,800 by 75 feet (1,463 x 23 m).

For the 12-month period ending August 28, 2008, the airport had 99,990 aircraft operations, an average of 273 per day: 99.9% general aviation and <0.1% military. At that time there were 281 aircraft based at this airport: 84% single-engine, 7% multi-engine, 1% jet, 3% helicopter and 6% ultralight.

== History ==
The airport was originally opened October 28, 1945, as Longmont Municipal Airport. The airport was renamed to Vance Brand Airport in October 1988.

== See also ==
- List of airports in Colorado
