= Central Colorado Regional Airport =

- IATA: none; ICAO: KAEJ; FAA LID: AEJ

Summary
- Airport type: Public
- Owner: Town of Buena Vista
- Location: Buena Vista, Colorado
- Opened: January 5, 1964; 62 years ago
- Elevation AMSL: 7,950 ft (2,420 m)
- Coordinates: 38°48′52″N 106°07′14″W
- Website: http://www.buenavistaairport.com/

Map
- Location within Colorado

Runways
Direction	Length		Surface
Direction	ft	m	Surface
15/33	8,303	2,530.7	Asphalt
- Source: Federal Aviation Administration

Central Colorado Regional Airport (ICAO: KAEJ, FAA LID: AEJ) is a public-use airport located 2 mi (3.2 km) south of Buena Vista, Colorado, United States.

Although most U.S. airports use the same three-letter location identifier for the FAA, ICAO and IATA, Central Colorado Regional Airport is assigned AEJ by the FAA and KAEJ by the ICAO but has no designation from the IATA.

== Facilities ==
Central Colorado Regional Airport covers an area of 235 acres (95 ha) which contains one asphalt paved runway (15/33) measuring 8,303 ft × 75 ft (2,531 m × 23 m).

== See also ==
- List of airports in Colorado
