= Colorado Springs East Airport =

Colorado Springs East Airport Springs East Airport
- IATA: none; ICAO: none; FAA LID: CO49

Summary
- Airport type: Private
- Owner: Springs East Airport, Inc.
- Operator: Contact: Debbie Privette
- Serves: Ellicott and Colorado Springs, Colorado
- Location: Ellicott, Colorado
- Elevation AMSL: 6,145 ft (1,873 m)
- Coordinates: 38°52′28″N 104°24′36″W
- Website: http://www.SpringsEastAirport.org
- Interactive map of Colorado Springs East Airport

Runways
Direction	Length		Surface
Direction	ft	m	Surface
17R/35L	4,500	1,372	Asphalt
17L/35R	4,500	1,372	Gravel
8/26	3,440	1,049	Gravel/dirt

Statistics (2008)
- Aircraft operations: 8,760
- Based aircraft: 58
- Source: Federal Aviation Administration

Colorado Springs East Airport (FAA LID: CO49) is a private airport located 25 miles (40 km) east of the central business district of the city of Colorado Springs, and 3 miles (4.8 km) northwest of the central business district of the city of Ellicott in El Paso County, Colorado, United States. The airport is privately owned by Springs East Airport, Inc. The airport is 2 miles (3.2 km) north of Highway 94 via a gravel road, and taxiways and vehicle roadways are gravel/grass/dirt.

== Facilities and aircraft ==
Colorado Springs East Airport covers a total area of 284 acres which contains three runways:

- Runway 17R/35L: 4,500 ft × 42 ft (1,372 m × 13 m), surface: asphalt
- Runway 17L/35R: 4,500 ft × 40 ft (1,372 m × 12 m), surface: gravel
- Runway 8/26: 3,440 ft × 60 ft (1,049 m × 18 m), surface: gravel/dirt

For the 12-month period ending December 31, 2008, the airport had 8,760 aircraft operations, an average of 24 per day: 80% general aviation local, 20% general aviation transient, and no military. There are 58 aircraft based at this airport: 54 single engine, one multi-engine, one helicopter, one glider, one ultra-light, and no military.

== See also ==
- List of airports in Colorado
