= Perry Stokes Airport =

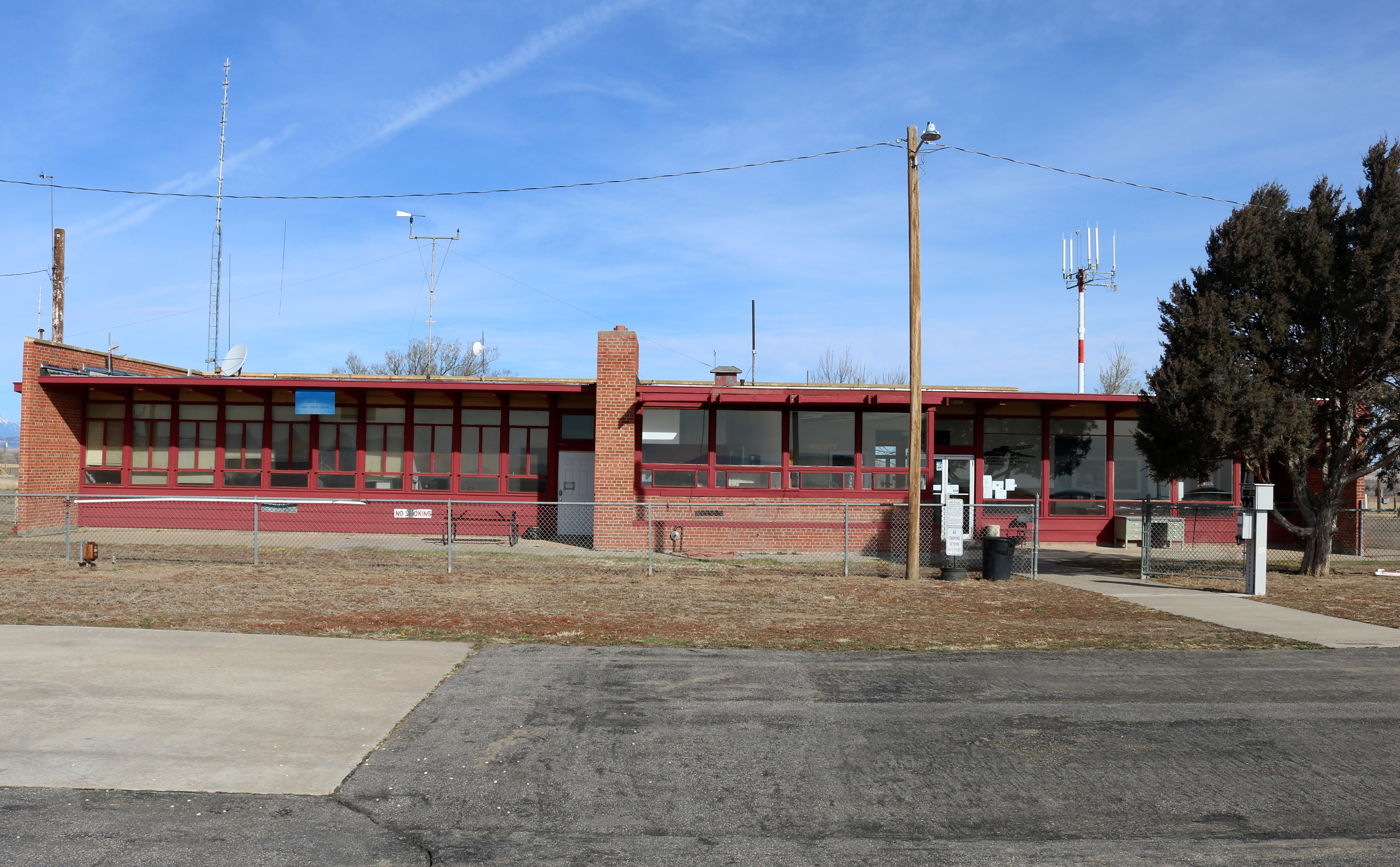
- The terminal building, viewed from the apron
- IATA: TAD; ICAO: KTAD

Summary
- Airport type: Public
- Operator: Las Animas County
- Location: Northeast of Trinidad, Colorado
- Elevation AMSL: 5,760 ft / 1,756 m
- Coordinates: 37°15′33.76″N 104°20′26.43″W
- Interactive map of Perry Stokes Airport

Runways
| Direction | Length | | Surface |
| Direction | ft | m | Surface |
|---|---|---|---|
| 3/21 | 5,500 | 1,676 | Asphalt |
| 9/27 | 5,500 | 1,676 | Gravel/dirt |

Perry Stokes Airport (IATA: TAD, ICAO: KTAD) is 11 miles (18 km) northeast of Trinidad, Colorado, United States. From 1949–50 to 1957 it was on Continental's route between Denver and Albuquerque, one DC-3 a day each way; it had commuter-airline flights in 1969–71, and possibly none since.

== Facilities ==
The airport covers 650 acres (263 ha) and has two runways:

- 3/21: 5,500 x 100 ft (30 m), asphalt
- 9/27: 5,500 x 100 ft (30 m), gravel/dirt

== History ==
Built in 1936 by the Works Project Administration, it was originally named Trinidad Airport. It takes its current name from Perry F. Stokes, an early airport manager and flight instructor.

== See also ==
- List of airports in Colorado
