= Animas Air Park =

Airport in Colorado, United States

- IATA: AMK; ICAO: none; FAA LID: 00C

Summary
- Airport type: Public use
- Owner: Airpark Property Owners Assoc.
- Serves: Durango, Colorado
- Elevation AMSL: 6,684 ft (2,037 m)
- Coordinates: 37°12′11″N 107°52′09″W

Map
- Location of airport in Colorado

Runways
Direction	Length		Surface
Direction	ft	m	Surface
1/19	5,010	1,527	Asphalt

Statistics (2009)
- Aircraft operations: 9,110
- Based aircraft: 48
- Source: Federal Aviation Administration

Animas Air Park (IATA: AMK, FAA LID: 00C) is a privately owned, public use airport located four nautical miles (5 mi, 7 km) south of the central business district of Durango, a city in La Plata County, Colorado, United States.

== Facilities and aircraft ==
Animas Air Park covers an area of 100 acres (40 ha) at an elevation of 6,684 feet (2,037 m) above mean sea level. It has one runway designated 1/19 with an asphalt surface measuring 5,010 by 50 feet (1,527 x 15 m).

For the 12-month period ending September 1, 2009, the airport had 9,110 aircraft operations, an average of 24 per day: 98.5% general aviation and 1.5% air taxi. At that time there were 48 aircraft based at this airport: 92% single-engine, 6% helicopter, and 2% multi-engine.

== See also ==
- List of airports in Colorado
