= Spanish Peaks Airfield =

Spanish Peaks Airfield Huerfano County (Spanish Peaks) Airport
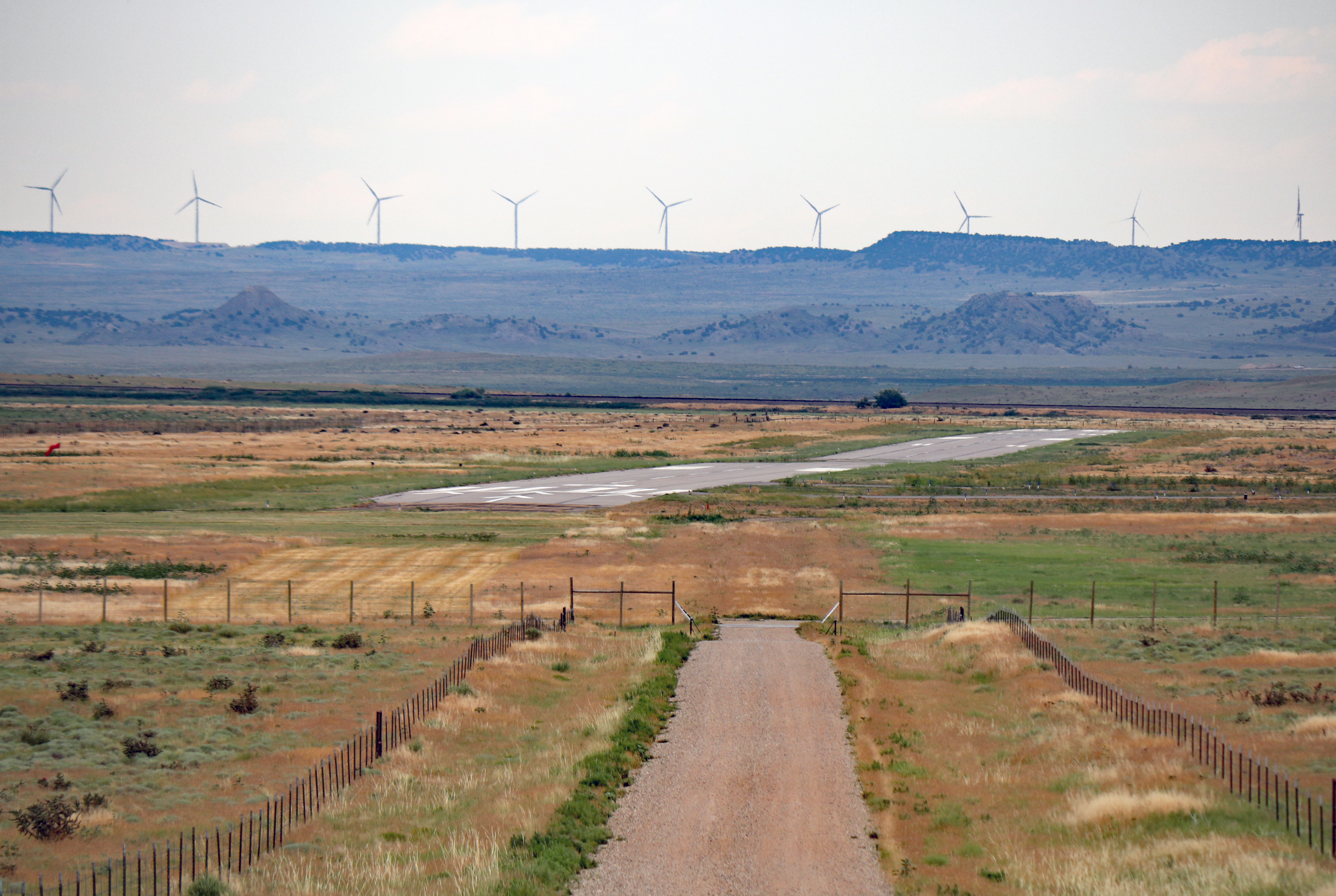
- The access road, a runway, the BNSF rail line, and the Peak View Wind Farm
- IATA: none; ICAO: none; FAA LID: 4V1

Summary
- Airport type: Public
- Owner: Huerfano County
- Operator: Contact: Gary Hanisch
- Serves: Huerfano County
- Location: Walsenburg, Colorado
- Elevation AMSL: 6,047 ft / 1,843 m
- Coordinates: 37°41′48″N 104°47′06″W
- Website: Official website
- Interactive map of Spanish Peaks Airfield

Runways
Direction	Length		Surface
Direction	ft	m	Surface
08/26	4,896	1,492	Asphalt
03/21	2,500	762	Turf/dirt

Statistics (2008)
- Aircraft operations: 3,500
- Based aircraft: 13
- Source: Federal Aviation Administration

Spanish Peaks Airfield (FAA LID: 4V1) is 5 miles north of Walsenburg in Huerfano County, Colorado, United States. It is owned by Huerfano County, and is named for the Spanish Peaks.

The airport is 2 miles (3 km) east of Interstate 25 via a gravel road, but taxiways are paved. The airport is near the junction of Interstate 25 (concurrent with U.S. Highway 85 and U.S. Highway 87), Highway 10, Highway 69, and U.S. Highway 160.

== Facilities ==
Spanish Peaks Airfield covers 80 acres and has two runways:

- 8/26: 4,896 x 60 ft (1,492 x 18 m): asphalt
- 3/21: 2,500 x 40 ft (762 x 12 m): grass/dirt

In the year ending August 16, 2008 the airport had 3,500 aircraft operations, average about 10 per day: 70% general aviation local, 30% general aviation transient, and no military. 13 aircraft are based at the airport: 12 single engine and 1 multi-engine.

== See also ==
- List of airports in Colorado
