= Stevens Field =

- Logo of Stevens Field

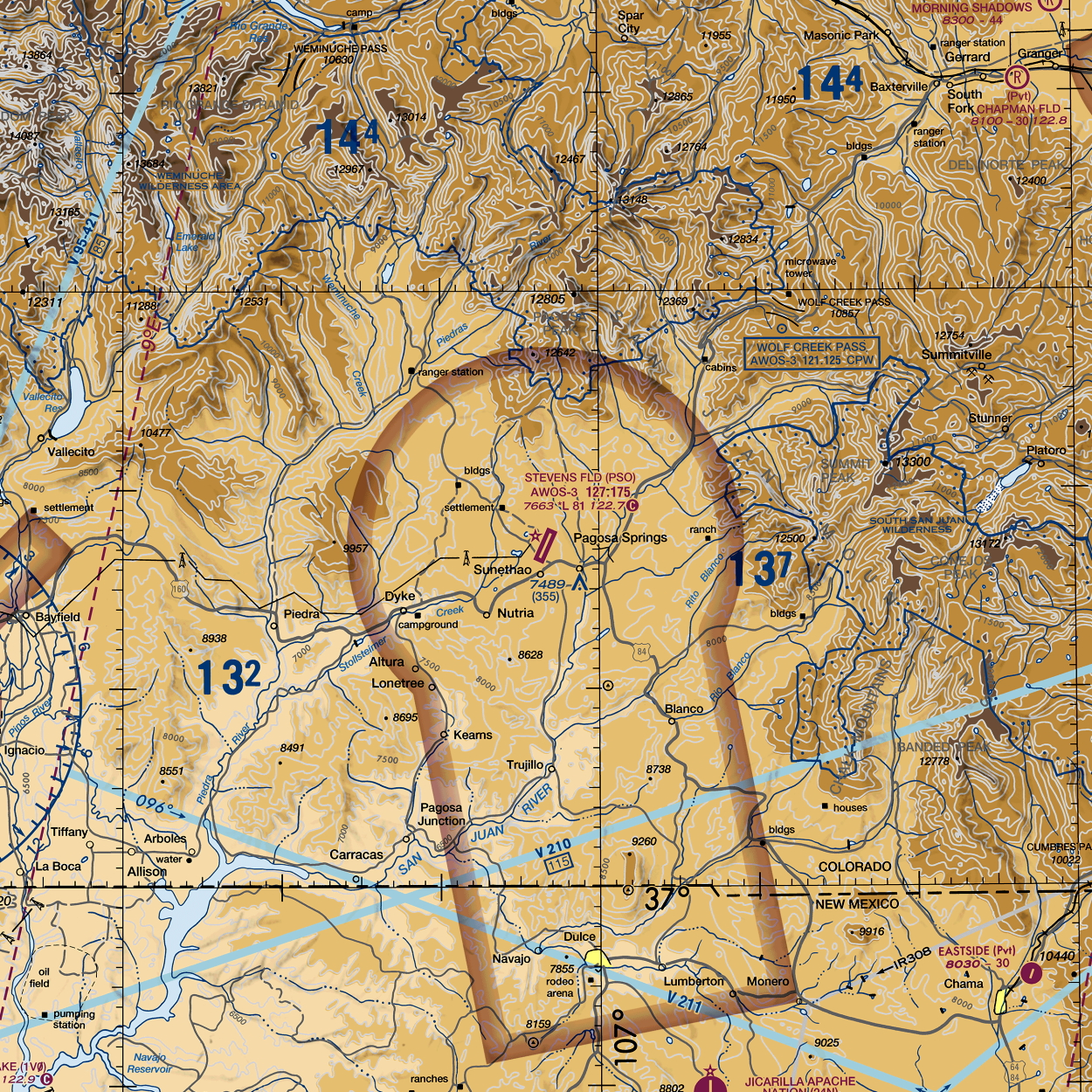
- VFR map of Stevens Field
- IATA: PGO; ICAO: KPSO; FAA LID: PSO

Summary
- Airport type: Public
- Owner: Archuleta County
- Serves: Pagosa Springs, Colorado
- Opened: August 1962
- Time zone: Mountain Time Zone (UTC−06:00)
  - Summer (DST): Mountain Daylight Time (UTC−07:00)
- Elevation AMSL: 7,663 ft / 2,336 m
- Coordinates: 37.28806°N 107.05502°W
- Website: www.archuletacounty.org/45/Airport

Maps
- Pagosa Springs, CO
- Interactive map of Stevens Field

Runways
Direction	Length		Surface
Direction	ft	m	Surface
01/19	8,100	2,469	Asphalt

Statistics (2020)
- Aircraft operations: 13,200
- Source: Federal Aviation Administration

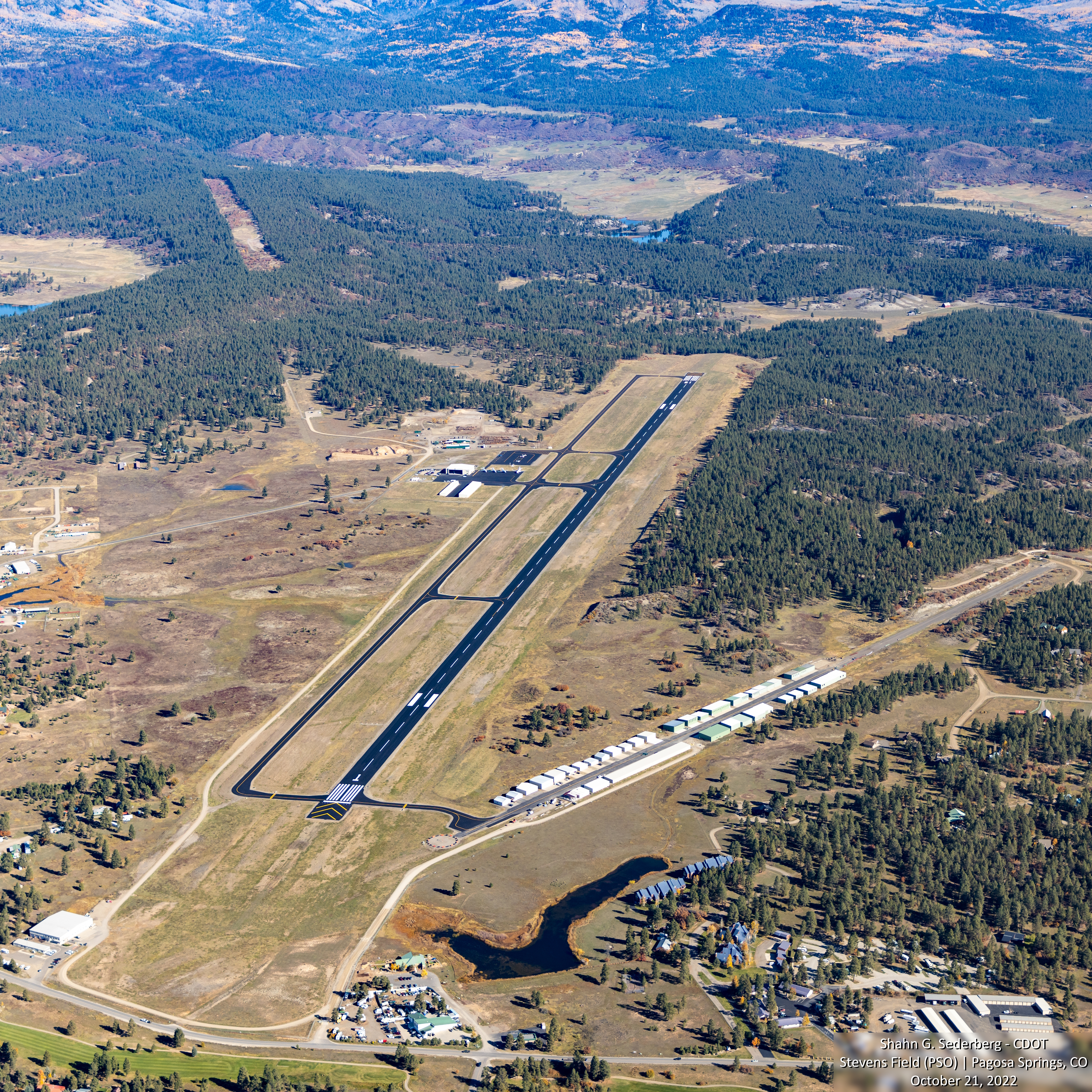
Stevens Field (PSO) - looking north

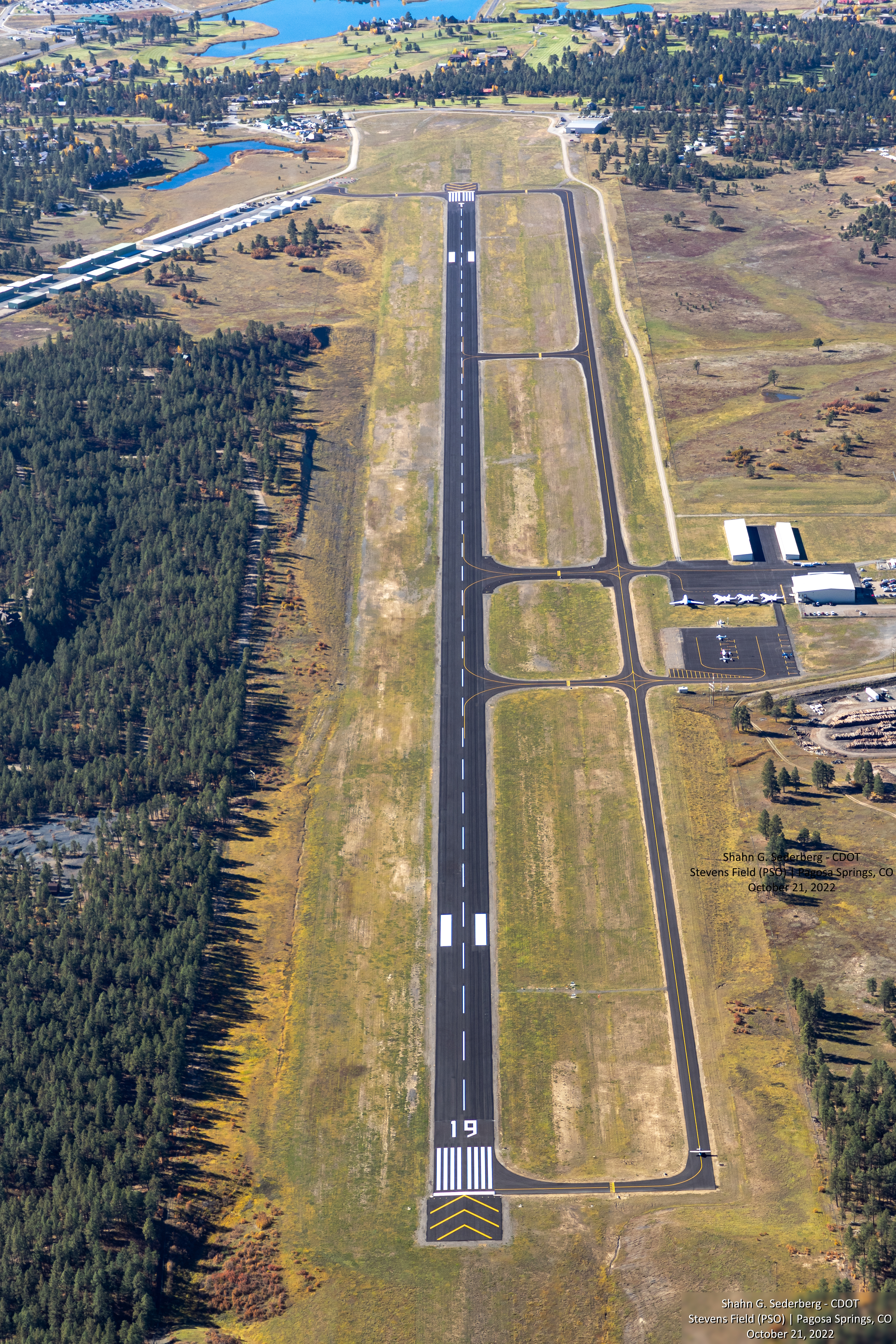
Stevens Field (PSO) - looking south

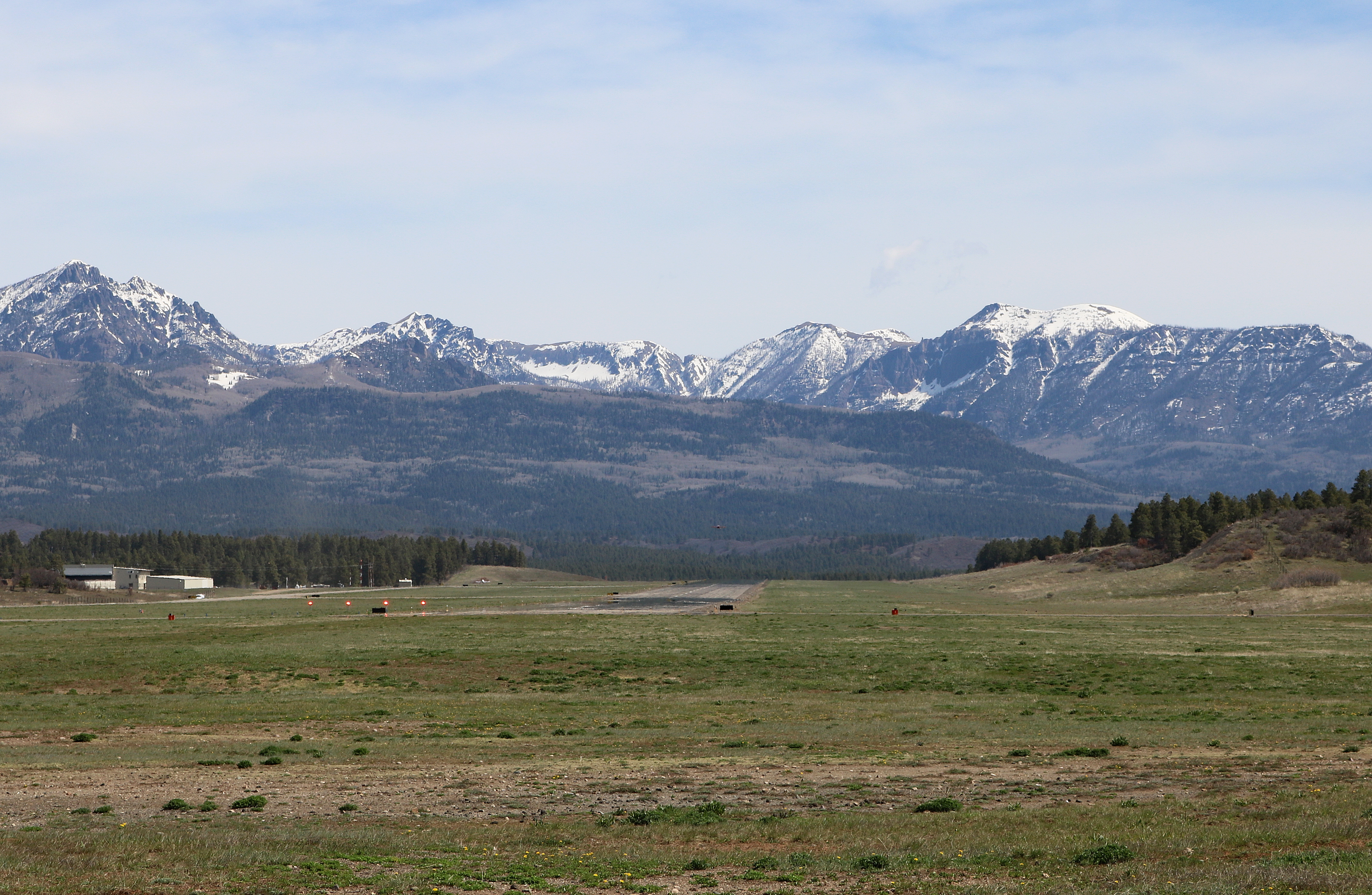
Runway 01/19 at Stevens Field, with the San Juan Mountains to the north

Stevens Field (IATA: PGO, ICAO: KPSO, FAA LID: PSO) is a public-use, general aviation airport located three miles northwest of the central business district of Pagosa Springs in Archuleta County, Colorado, United States. It is publicly owned by Archuleta County. It has no air traffic control tower or commercial passenger services, but it does have a fixed-base operator (FBO), and it is popular among light sport and general aviation aircraft doing cross country flights, where the airport serves as a general aviation-friendly waypoint, refueling stop, and pilot rest/sleep opportunity. Its address is 61 Aviation Court, Pagosa Springs, Colorado.

The airport is referred to by many other names, including "Pagosa Airport", "Pagosa Springs Airfield", numerous hyphenated variants, and "Archuleta County Airport" (especially used by the county itself, which operates the airport). These names are local nomenclatures, however, and are not legally recognized by the FAA, Colorado Department of Transportation, or other official transportation authorities.

== Facilities and aircraft ==
Stevens Field covers an area of approximately 328 acres (133 ha) at an elevation of 7,663 feet (2,336 m) above mean sea level. It has one runway designated 01/19 with an asphalt surface measuring 8,100 by 100 feet (2,469 by 30 m). Due to the nature of the surrounding mountains and elevation, larger aircraft are generally advised to only depart from and land on runway 19 (e.g., heading south).

The airport's fixed-base operator (FBO) provides an attended pilot lounge with seating, restrooms, free WiFi, and full service refueling. The airport also provides at least one courtesy vehicle that can be used by visiting pilots for free on a first-come-first-serve basis, limited to day or overnight use and travel in the immediate vicinity.

The airport operates in Class G airspace, and Class E above it begins at 700 feet AGL. The airport hosts a variety of traditional and "non-traditional" flying and aircraft, including fixed wing, weight shift, powered parachutes (PPC), powered paragliders (PPG), and hang gliders. Balloonists operate in the area year round, and will frequently cross over and through the airport's airspace heading east to west, especially in early mornings when launched from Pagosa Springs.

For the 12-month period ending December 31, 2020, the airport had an average of 255 aircraft operations per week: 59% transient general aviation, 38% local general aviation, and 3% military.

== Communications and information ==
The use of a two-way aviation band radio is not technically required, but is strongly recommended for all pilots and other operators in the area, especially due to the diversity of aircraft in the area and the significant difference in approaching airspeed between them.

Because there is no air traffic control tower at the airport, all ground and air traffic communicate using a common traffic advisory frequency (CTAF) of 122.700 MHz (UNICOM).

Weather information is collected by an onsite FAA-certified automated airport weather station (AWOS-3) and broadcast at 127.175 MHz (station KPSO); alternatively it can be heard by calling a local telephone number, as provided in the FAA information portal, or found as a METAR online through the NOAA's Aviation Weather Center. Nearby mountain weather in Wolf Creek Pass, which can significantly impact flight operations in the area, is also collected by an AWOS-3 (station KCPW) and broadcast at 121.125 MHz.

== History ==
In 1961, rancher Johnny Stevens donated 40 acres of land, while Agapita Gomez donated a smaller parcel, that together established the original airport location.

The first runway was a gravel strip, built as a community project (runway 4/22). According to local interviews, Vic Poma and other local businessmen brought in their own equipment - including tractors, bulldozers and the occasional wheelbarrow – and furnished the rock and gravel. That runway was eventually paved in later years following greater oversight of the airport by Archuleta County, and today it functions as an adjoined taxiway along which numerous hangars house general aviation aircraft. It is located in alignment with Condor Drive.

For many years local Vic Poma, who worked at the Texaco Station, provided fuel for aircraft. There were three hangars on the west side of the airport, as well as a hangar and small apartment belonging to M.O. Smith, another Pagosa Springs aviator.

In 1975, a fixed based operator called Pagosa Springs Aviation began offering charter services, flight instructions, and fuel sales. The business was initially operated from M.O. Smith's hangar/apartment building, until the county built a terminal building and leased it to Pagosa Springs Aviation, which became the FBO site in 1976. The FBO manager would often lend his truck to a visiting pilot who needed to go into town, while the manager's wife fueled a visitor's plane.

Records of when the current primary runway was established are unclear. At some point in the early 1980s, the new primary runway was established and built (runway 1/19).

In 1982, Nick Nichols purchased the property owned by M.O. Smith (at the southwestern end of runway 1/19) and built a large hangar and office building known as Nick's Hangar. The building was later donated to the county by Nichol's estate. It has subsequently been home to various FBOs, including FlightCraft Aviation, Flight Crafton, and WindDancer Aviation, and Avjet Corporation, as well as Archuleta County's own airport operations.

As the population of Archuleta County grew, the demands for aviation services increased: air ambulance services were often required; fire-fighting crews arrived and camped at Stevens Field when the need arose; and more people required convenient, fast transportation for their businesses and recreation.

In the fall of 2005, the airport took advantage of several FAA grants to extensively improve the airport, and construction occurred through 2006. The result is that the county's original terminal building was abandoned, the primary runway was significantly improved, a new midfield terminal and FBO facility was constructed, and the AWOS was installed. This also resulted in public access to the airport thereafter being rerouted to the new facility along Cloman Boulevard.

== See also ==
- List of airports in Colorado
