= Lamar Municipal Airport (Colorado) =

Airport in Colorado, United States

Southeast Colorado Regional Airport
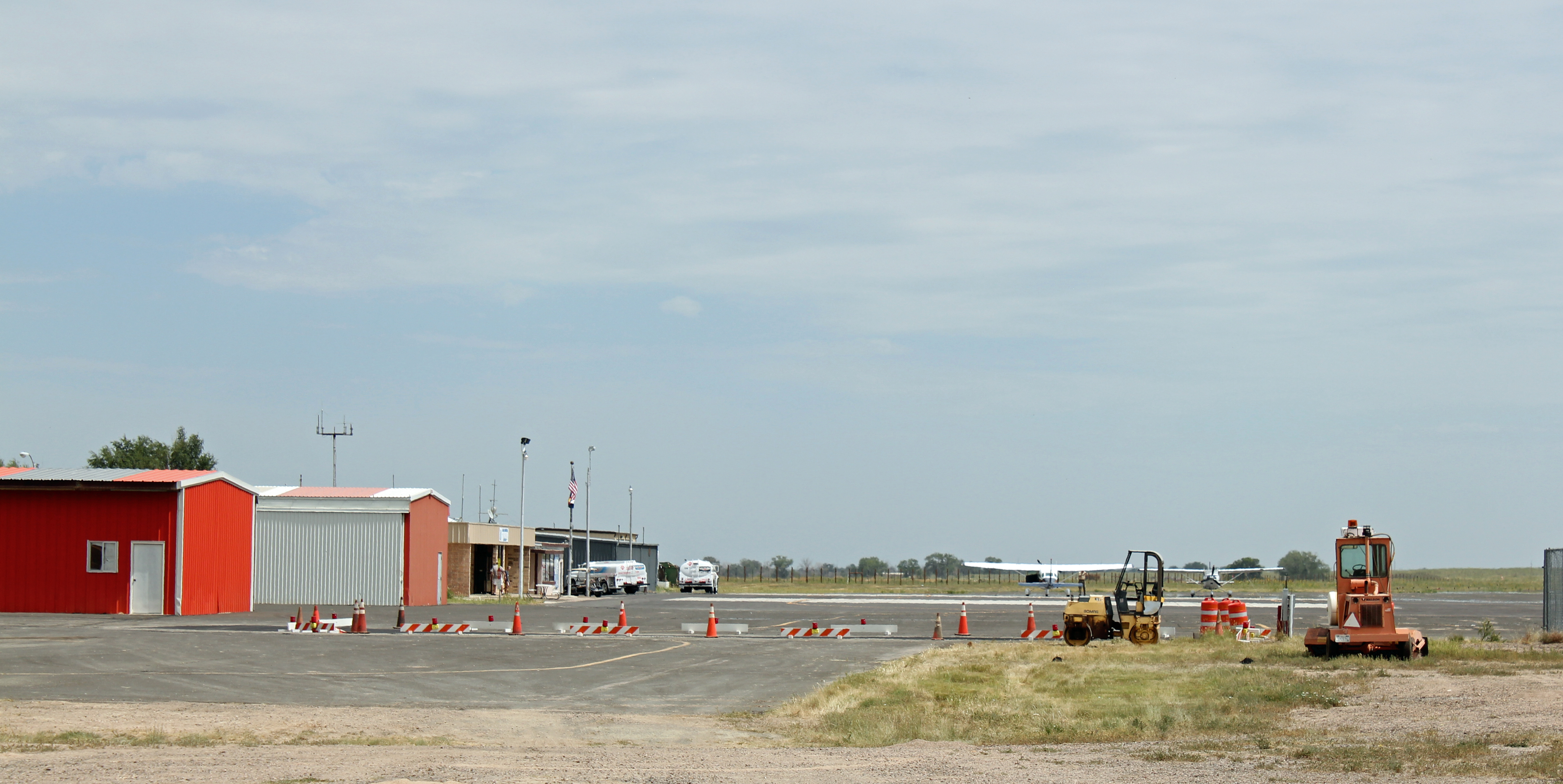
- IATA: LAA; ICAO: KLAA; FAA LID: LAA

Summary
- Airport type: Public
- Owner: City of Lamar
- Serves: Lamar, Colorado
- Elevation AMSL: 3,706 ft (1,130 m)
- Coordinates: 38°04′11″N 102°41′19″W
- Website: http://www.ci.lamar.co.us/index.asp?Type=B_BASIC&SEC={C91FC3CC-5A83-4F9C-9AF7-A96F374C2EE5

Map
- Location in Colorado

Runways
| Direction | Length | | Surface |
| Direction | ft | m | Surface |
|---|---|---|---|
| 18/36 | 6,304 | 1,921 | Concrete |
| 8/26 | 5,001 | 1,524 | Asphalt |

Statistics (2010)
- Aircraft operations: 13,508
- Based aircraft: 33
- Source: Federal Aviation Administration

Southeast Colorado Regional Airport (formerly known as the Lamar Municipal Airport) (IATA: LAA, ICAO: KLAA, FAA LID: LAA) is in Prowers County, Colorado, three miles southwest of Lamar, which owns it. The National Plan of Integrated Airport Systems for 2011–2015 called it a general aviation facility.

Airline flights (Central DC-3s) started about 1957; commuter airlines replaced successor Frontier in 1976-77.

== Facilities ==
The airport covers 557 acres (225 ha) at an elevation of 3,706 feet (1,130 m). It has two runways: 18/36 is 6,304 by 100 feet (1,921 x 30 m) concrete and 8/26 is 5,001 by 60 feet (1,524 x 18 m) asphalt.

In 2010 the airport had 13,508 aircraft operations, average 37 per day: 65% general aviation, 26% air taxi, and 9% military. 33 aircraft were then based at this airport: 73% single-engine, 24% multi-engine, and 3% jet.

== See also ==
- List of airports in Colorado
