= Boulder Municipal Airport =

Airport in Boulder County, Colorado, United States

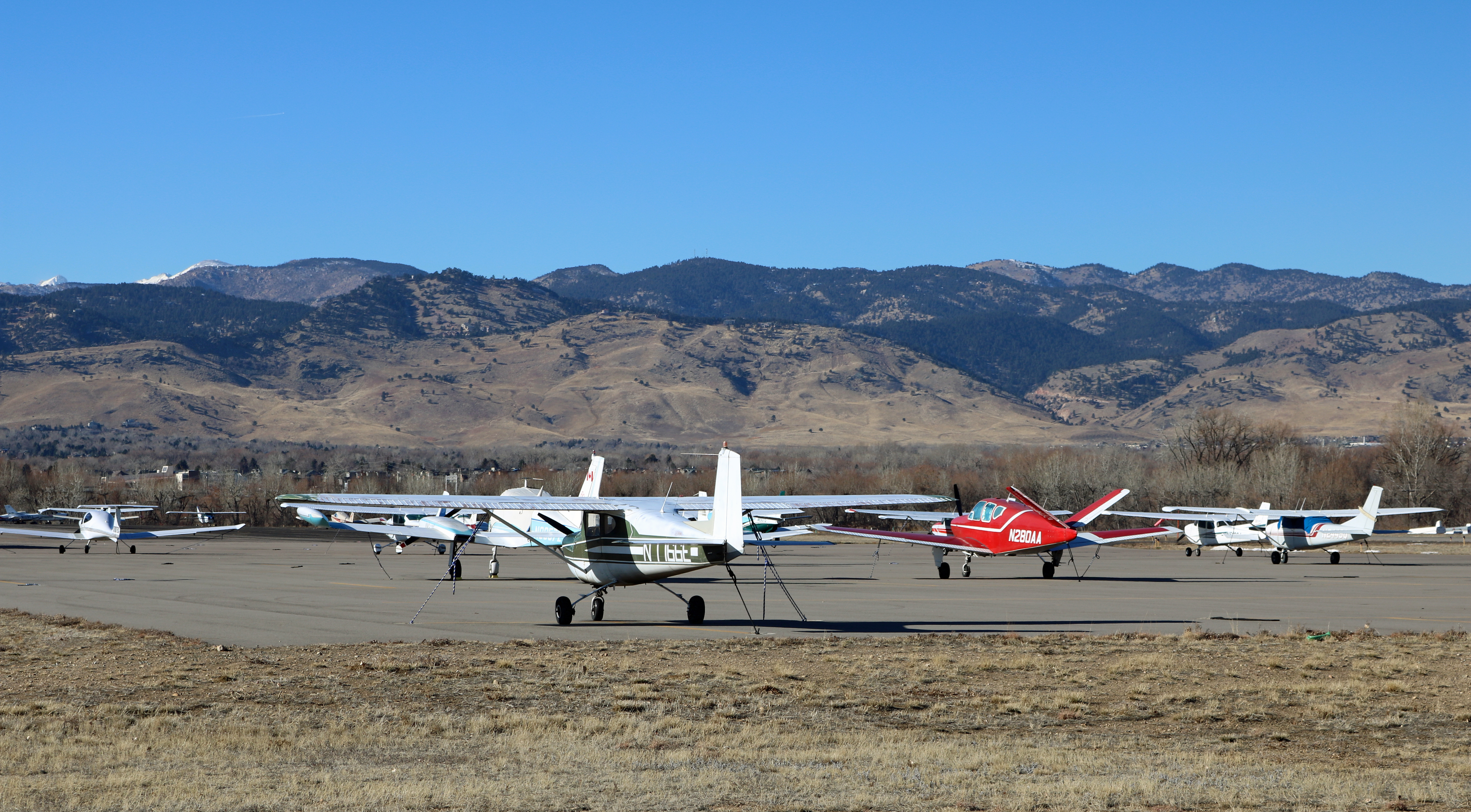
- IATA: WBU; ICAO: KBDU; FAA LID: BDU

Summary
- Airport type: Public
- Owner: City of Boulder
- Location: Boulder, Colorado
- Elevation AMSL: 5,288 ft (1,612 m)
- Coordinates: 40°02′22″N 105°13′33″W
- Website: bouldercolorado.gov/airport
- Interactive map of Boulder Municipal Airport

Runways
Direction	Length		Surface
Direction	ft	m	Surface
8/26	4,100	1,250	Asphalt
8G/26G	4,100	1,250	Asphalt/turf

Statistics (2017)
- Aircraft operations: 56,629
- Based aircraft: 59
- Source: Federal Aviation Administration

Boulder Municipal Airport (IATA: WBU, ICAO: KBDU, FAA LID: BDU) is a public airport located 3 miles (4.8 km) northeast of the central business district of Boulder, a city in Boulder County, Colorado, United States. It is owned by the City of Boulder and used almost exclusively for general aviation. Its location in the foothills of the Rockies east of the continental divide gives excellent conditions for gliding, and there is extensive gliding activity. It is the base of the Soaring Society of Boulder.

Founded in 1928, Boulder Municipal Airport is Colorado's oldest operating public airport.

Some college basketball teams fly into Boulder, rather than Denver International Airport, for games vs. the University of Colorado. College football teams playing at Boulder must fly into DIA, approximately 40 miles east, since Boulder is not equipped to handle the large jets chartered by those squads.

Most U.S. airports use the same three-letter location identifier for the FAA and IATA, but Boulder Municipal is BDU (formerly 1V5) to the FAA and WBU to the IATA (which assigned BDU to Bardufoss Airport in Bardufoss, Norway).

== Facilities ==
The airport covers 136 acres (55 ha) and has two runways:

- Runway 8/26: 4,100 x 75 ft (1,250 x 23 m), surface: asphalt
- Runway 8G/26G: 4,100 x 25 ft (1,250 x 8 m), surface: asphalt/turf

In the year ending December 31, 2017, the airport had 56,629 aircraft operations, averaging 155 per day; all general aviation. 59 aircraft were based at this airport: 35 single-engine, 5 multi-engine, and 19 gliders.

The airport has an executive terminal, which is operated by Journeys Aviation.

== Proposed Decommissioning ==
In 2024, city officials explored plans to close the airport and use the land for housing and other purposes, and address noise and lead pollution concerns. The city filed a lawsuit with the FAA to allow Boulder to close the airport by 2040, but it was dismissed on procedural grounds and not appealed. The community group Airport Neighborhood Campaign gathered enough signatures for a ballot measure to close the airport, but withdrew it citing the cities lawsuit.

In July 2026, the city voted to keep the airport open indefinitely. Councilperson Mark Wallach resigned over the issue on the spot, saying the decision goes against his values.

== See also ==
- List of airports in the Denver area
- List of airports in Colorado
