= Center, Colorado =

Statutory town in Saguache and Rio Grande counties, Colorado, USA

- Statutory town
- Town of Center
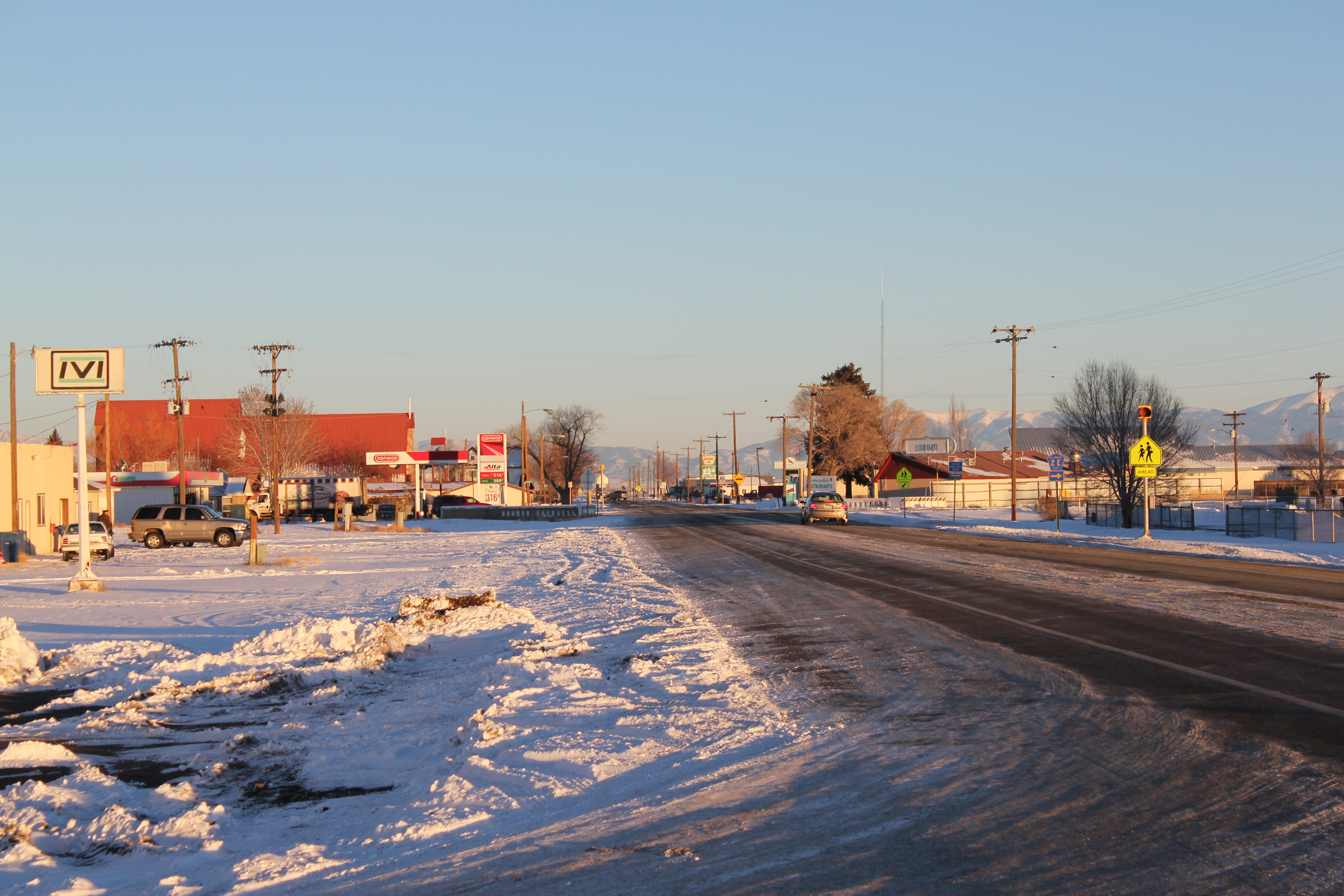
- Center in winter, December 2012

- Location of the Town of Center in Saguache and Rio Grande counties, Colorado
- Coordinates: 37°44′58″N 106°07′01″W
- Country: United States
- State: Colorado
- Counties: Saguache; Rio Grande
- Incorporated: January 18, 1907

Government
  - Type: Statutory town

Area
  - Total: 0.864 sq mi (2.238 km^{2})
  - Land: 0.864 sq mi (2.238 km^{2})
  - Water: 0 sq mi (0.000 km^{2})
- Elevation: 7,645 ft (2,330 m)

Population (2020)
  - Total: 1,929
  - Density: 2,232/sq mi (862/km^{2})
- Time zone: UTC−07:00 (MST)
  - Summer (DST): UTC−06:00 (MDT)
- ZIP code: 81125
- Area code: 719
- GNIS town ID: 2413186
- FIPS code: 12855
- Website: www.centerco.gov

Center is a statutory town located in Saguache and Rio Grande counties, Colorado, United States. The town's population was 1,929 at the 2020 United States census with 1,885 residing in Saguache County and 44 residing in Rio Grande County.

== History ==
The Centerview, Colorado, post office opened on April 22, 1898, but the name of the post office was changed to Center, Colorado, on July 1, 1899. The Town of Center was incorporated on January 18, 1907. The town lies near the center of the San Luis Valley, hence the name.

== Facilities ==
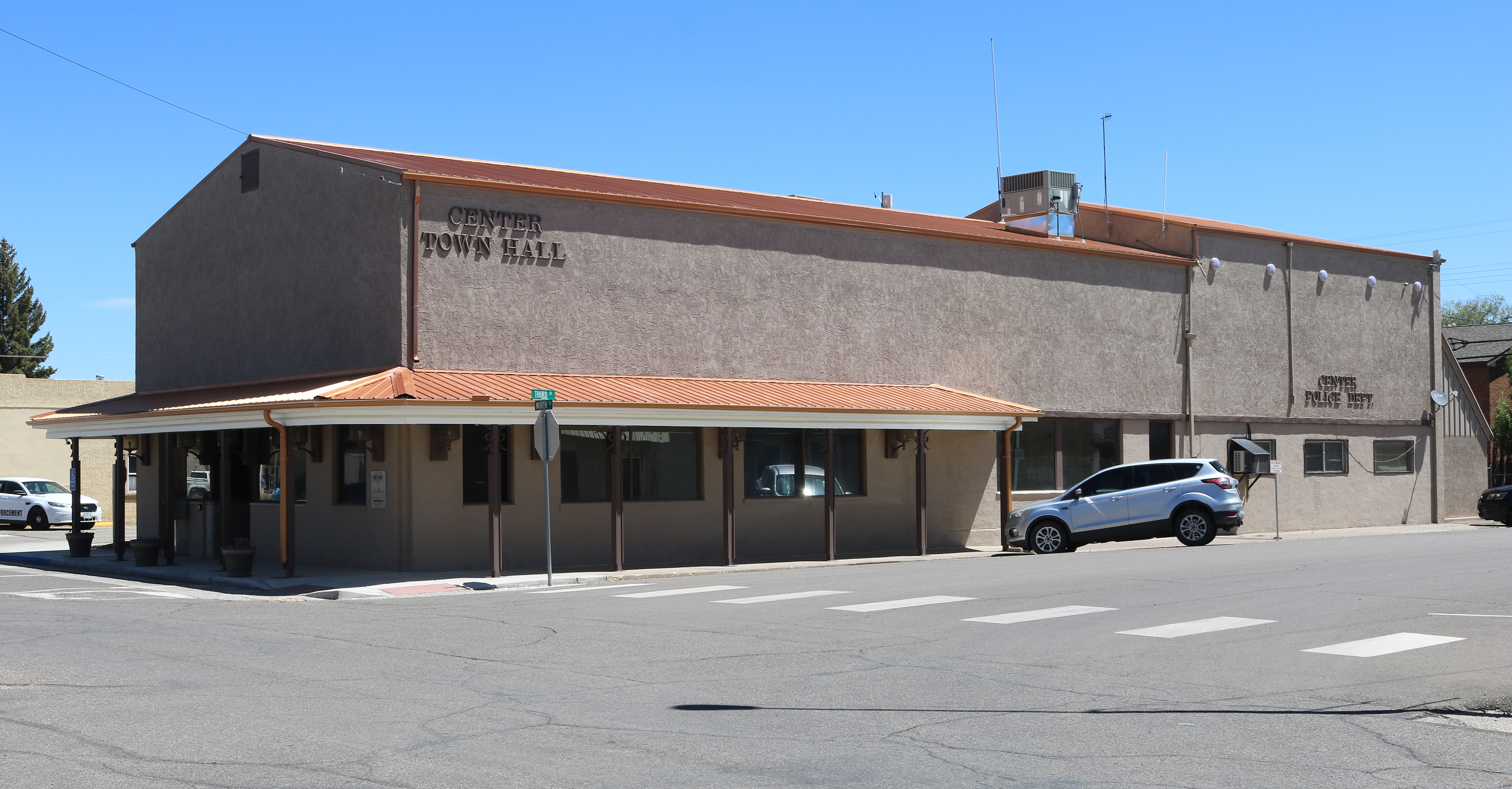
The Center Town Hall

Leach Airport is located 4 miles east and 3 miles north of town, at County Road 53 and County Road C. The nearest college is Adams State College; 23 miles to Alamosa, Colorado.

== Geography ==
At the 2020 United States census, the town had a total area of 553 acres (2.238 km^{2}), all of it land.

=== Climate ===
Center has a cold desert climate (Köppen BWk), bordering on a cold semi-arid climate (Köppen BSk).

Climate data for Center 4 SSW, Colorado, 1991–2020 normals, 1941-2020 records: 7,673 ft (2,339 m)
Month	Jan	Feb	Mar	Apr	May	Jun	Jul	Aug	Sep	Oct	Nov	Dec	Year
Record high °F (°C)	59 (15)	65 (18)	74 (23)	83 (28)	88 (31)	95 (35)	94 (34)	90 (32)	89 (32)	81 (27)	68 (20)	61 (16)	95 (35)
Mean maximum °F (°C)	46.6 (8.1)	52.2 (11.2)	65.4 (18.6)	72.5 (22.5)	79.7 (26.5)	87.3 (30.7)	88.4 (31.3)	86.2 (30.1)	81.9 (27.7)	74.6 (23.7)	61.3 (16.3)	50.0 (10.0)	89.6 (32.0)
Mean daily maximum °F (°C)	31.6 (−0.2)	38.0 (3.3)	49.4 (9.7)	58.1 (14.5)	66.8 (19.3)	76.3 (24.6)	79.8 (26.6)	78.5 (25.8)	72.9 (22.7)	60.8 (16.0)	46.1 (7.8)	33.4 (0.8)	57.6 (14.2)
Daily mean °F (°C)	17.9 (−7.8)	24.0 (−4.4)	34.8 (1.6)	42.7 (5.9)	51.5 (10.8)	59.3 (15.2)	63.8 (17.7)	62.4 (16.9)	56.2 (13.4)	44.7 (7.1)	31.3 (−0.4)	19.2 (−7.1)	42.3 (5.7)
Mean daily minimum °F (°C)	4.2 (−15.4)	10.0 (−12.2)	20.2 (−6.6)	27.3 (−2.6)	36.2 (2.3)	42.3 (5.7)	47.7 (8.7)	46.3 (7.9)	39.5 (4.2)	28.5 (−1.9)	16.5 (−8.6)	5.0 (−15.0)	27.0 (−2.8)
Mean minimum °F (°C)	−12.7 (−24.8)	−9.3 (−22.9)	3.6 (−15.8)	13.7 (−10.2)	24.3 (−4.3)	33.1 (0.6)	40.5 (4.7)	39.0 (3.9)	27.9 (−2.3)	14.3 (−9.8)	−1.6 (−18.7)	−12.8 (−24.9)	−17.5 (−27.5)
Record low °F (°C)	−40 (−40)	−32 (−36)	−16 (−27)	−4 (−20)	12 (−11)	23 (−5)	31 (−1)	28 (−2)	16 (−9)	−4 (−20)	−25 (−32)	−41 (−41)	−41 (−41)
Average precipitation inches (mm)	0.13 (3.3)	0.27 (6.9)	0.33 (8.4)	0.53 (13)	0.58 (15)	0.63 (16)	1.32 (34)	1.19 (30)	0.70 (18)	0.61 (15)	0.46 (12)	0.46 (12)	7.21 (183.6)
Average snowfall inches (cm)	3.50 (8.9)	2.90 (7.4)	5.50 (14.0)	1.80 (4.6)	0.60 (1.5)	0.00 (0.00)	0.00 (0.00)	0.00 (0.00)	0.00 (0.00)	1.60 (4.1)	3.10 (7.9)	6.10 (15.5)	25.1 (63.9)
Average precipitation days (≥ 0.01 in)	2.2	2.2	2.9	3.3	4.4	5.0	7.5	9.3	6.4	4.3	3.0	2.7	53.2
Average snowy days (≥ 0.1 in)	2.0	1.5	2.0	0.7	0.2	0.0	0.0	0.0	0.0	0.4	1.5	1.7	10
Source 1: NOAA
Source 2: XMACIS2 (records & monthly max/mins)

== Demographics ==
Historical population
Census	Pop.	Note	%±
1910	385		—
1920	547		42.1%
1930	1,011		84.8%
1940	1,515		49.9%
1950	2,024		33.6%
1960	1,600		−20.9%
1970	1,470		−8.1%
1980	1,630		10.9%
1990	1,963		20.4%
2000	2,392		21.9%
2010	2,230		−6.8%
2020	1,929		−13.5%
U.S. Decennial Census

=== 2020 census ===
As of the 2020 census, Center had a population of 1,929. The median age was 34.8 years. For every 100 females there were 93.1 males, and for every 100 females age 18 and over there were 90.7 males age 18 and over.

28.8% of residents were under the age of 18 and 13.5% of residents were 65 years of age or older.

0.0% of residents lived in urban areas, while 100.0% lived in rural areas.

There were 737 households in Center, of which 38.9% had children under the age of 18 living in them. Of all households, 38.3% were married-couple households, 20.6% were households with a male householder and no spouse or partner present, and 33.2% were households with a female householder and no spouse or partner present. About 28.8% of all households were made up of individuals and 13.6% had someone living alone who was 65 years of age or older.

There were 860 housing units, of which 14.3% were vacant. The homeowner vacancy rate was 0.8% and the rental vacancy rate was 11.1%.

Racial composition as of the 2020 census
Race	Number	Percent
White	584	30.3%
Black or African American	3	0.2%
American Indian and Alaska Native	89	4.6%
Asian	1	0.1%
Native Hawaiian and Other Pacific Islander	0	0.0%
Some other race	436	22.6%
Two or more races	816	42.3%
Hispanic or Latino (of any race)	1,733	89.8%

=== Income and poverty ===
The median income for a household in the town was $23,780, and the median income for a family was $26,143. Males had a median income of $20,844 versus $18,036 for females. The per capita income for the town was $9,289. About 27.1% of families and 27.5% of the population were below the poverty line, including 31.6% of those under age 18 and 22.8% of those age 65 or over.

== Education ==
- Public high schools:
1. Center High School - grades 9 - 12
2. The Academic Recovery Center of San Luis Valley - grades 9 - 12
- Public elementary/middle schools:
1. Haskin Elementary School
2. Skoglund Middle School - grades 6 - 8
- Private elementary/middle school in Center:
1. High Valley Christian School

== See also ==
- List of municipalities in Colorado
