= Kit Carson County Airport =

- IATA: none; ICAO: KITR; FAA LID: ITR

Summary
- Airport type: Public
- Owner: City of Burlington
- Serves: Burlington, Colorado
- Elevation AMSL: 4,219 ft (1,286 m)
- Coordinates: 39°14′33″N 102°17′07″W
- Website: Official website
- Interactive map of Kit Carson County Airport

Runways
Direction	Length		Surface
Direction	ft	m	Surface
15/33	5,201	1,585	Asphalt

Statistics (2007)
- Aircraft operations: 7,713
- Based aircraft: 20
- Source: Federal Aviation Administration

Kit Carson County Airport (ICAO: KITR, FAA LID: ITR, formerly 5C0) is in Kit Carson County, Colorado, three miles south of Burlington, which owns it. The FAA's National Plan of Integrated Airport Systems for 2009–2013 categorized it as a general aviation facility.

Many U.S. airports use the same three-letter location identifier for the FAA and IATA, but this airport is ITR to the FAA and has no IATA code (Itumbiara in Goiás, Brazil has IATA code ITR).

== Facilities ==
The airport covers 684 acres (277 ha) at an elevation of 4,219 feet (1,286 m). Its one runway, 15/33, is 5,201 by 75 feet (1,585 x 23 m) asphalt.

In 2007, the airport had 7,713 aircraft operations at an average of 21 per day: 95% general aviation and 5% air taxi. 20 aircraft were then based at the airport, all single-engine.

== See also ==
- List of airports in Colorado
