= Yuma Municipal Airport =

- IATA: none; ICAO: none; FAA LID: 2V6

Summary
- Airport type: Public
- Owner: City of Yuma
- Serves: Yuma, Colorado
- Elevation AMSL: 4,136 ft / 1,261 m
- Coordinates: 40°06′15″N 102°42′47″W
- Interactive map of Yuma Municipal Airport

Runways
| Direction | Length | | Surface |
| Direction | ft | m | Surface |
|---|---|---|---|
| 12/30 | 2,900 | 884 | Asphalt/gravel |
| 16/34 | 4,200 | 1,280 | Concrete |

Statistics (2016)
- Aircraft operations: 5,000
- Source: Federal Aviation Administration

Yuma Municipal Airport (FAA LID: 2V6) is a mile southeast of Yuma, in Yuma County, Colorado, United States. It is owned by the City of Yuma.

== Facilities ==
The airport covers 236 acres (96 ha) and has two runways:

- 12/30: 2,900 x 40 ft (884 x 12 m), surface: asphalt/gravel
- 16/34: 4,200 x 75 ft (1,280 x 23 m), surface: concrete

In the year ending December 31, 2016 the airport had 5,000 aircraft operations, all general aviation.

== See also ==
- List of airports in Colorado
