= Limon, Colorado =

Town in Colorado, United States

- Statutory Town
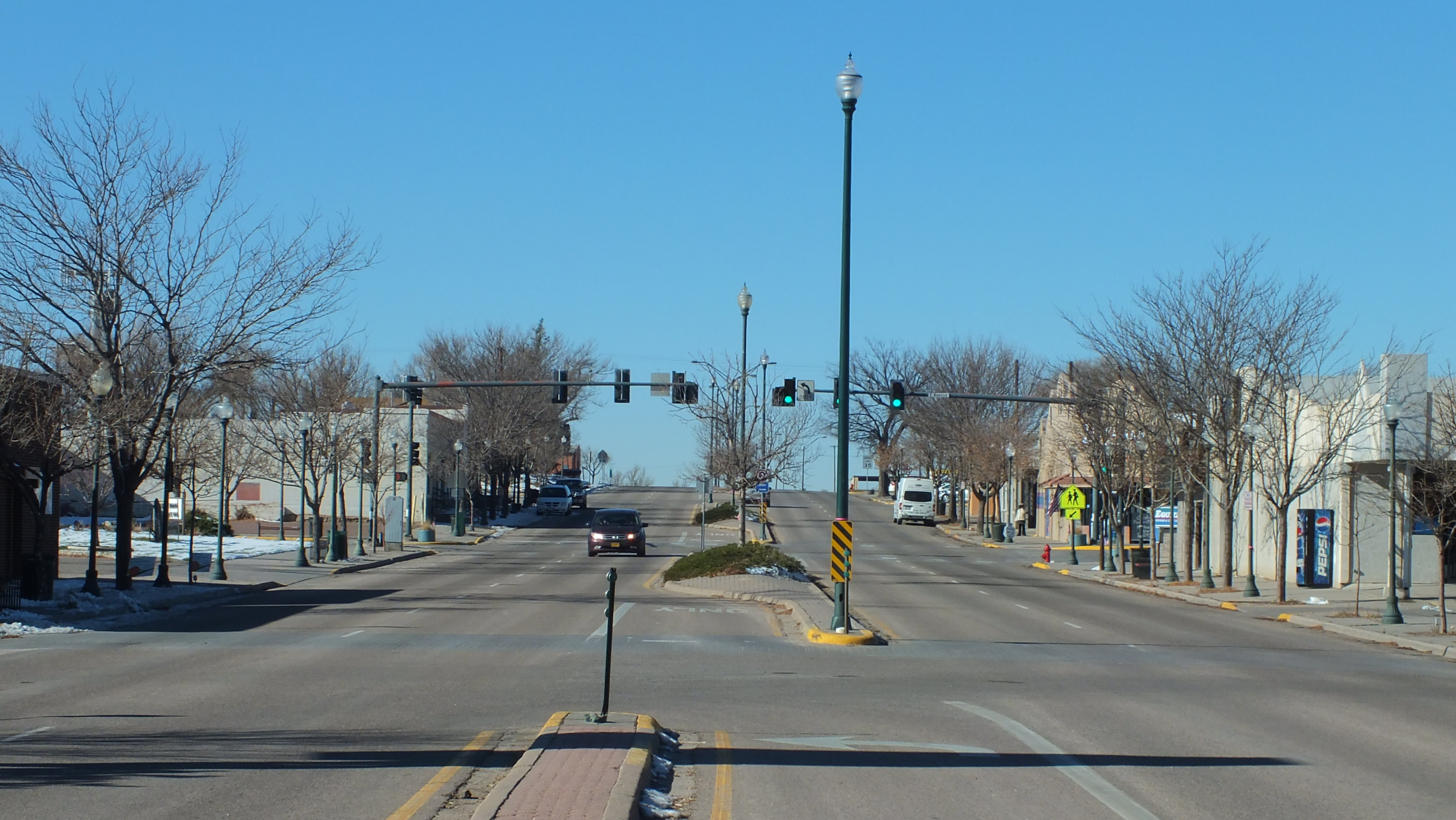
- Limon (2012)

- Location within Lincoln County and Colorado
- Coordinates: 39°15′50″N 103°41′32″W
- Country: United States
- State: Colorado
- County: Lincoln
- Incorporated: November 18, 1909

Area
  - Total: 3.19 sq mi (8.27 km^{2})
  - Land: 3.16 sq mi (8.19 km^{2})
  - Water: 0.031 sq mi (0.08 km^{2})
- Elevation: 5,378 ft (1,639 m)

Population (2020)
  - Total: 2,043
  - Density: 646/sq mi (249/km^{2})
- Time zone: UTC−7 (MST)
  - Summer (DST): UTC−6 (MDT)
- ZIP Codes: 80826, 80828
- Area code: 719
- FIPS code: FIPS 08 44980
- GNIS ID: 204819
- Website: townoflimon.com

Limon (pronounced /ˈlaɪmən/ LYE-mən) is a statutory town in Lincoln County, Colorado, United States. Its population was 2,043 at the 2020 United States census, the most populous municipality of the county. Limon lies at the intersection of Interstate 70, U.S. Highways 24, 40, 287, and Colorado Highway 71, leading it to be dubbed the "Hub City" of eastern Colorado.

== History ==
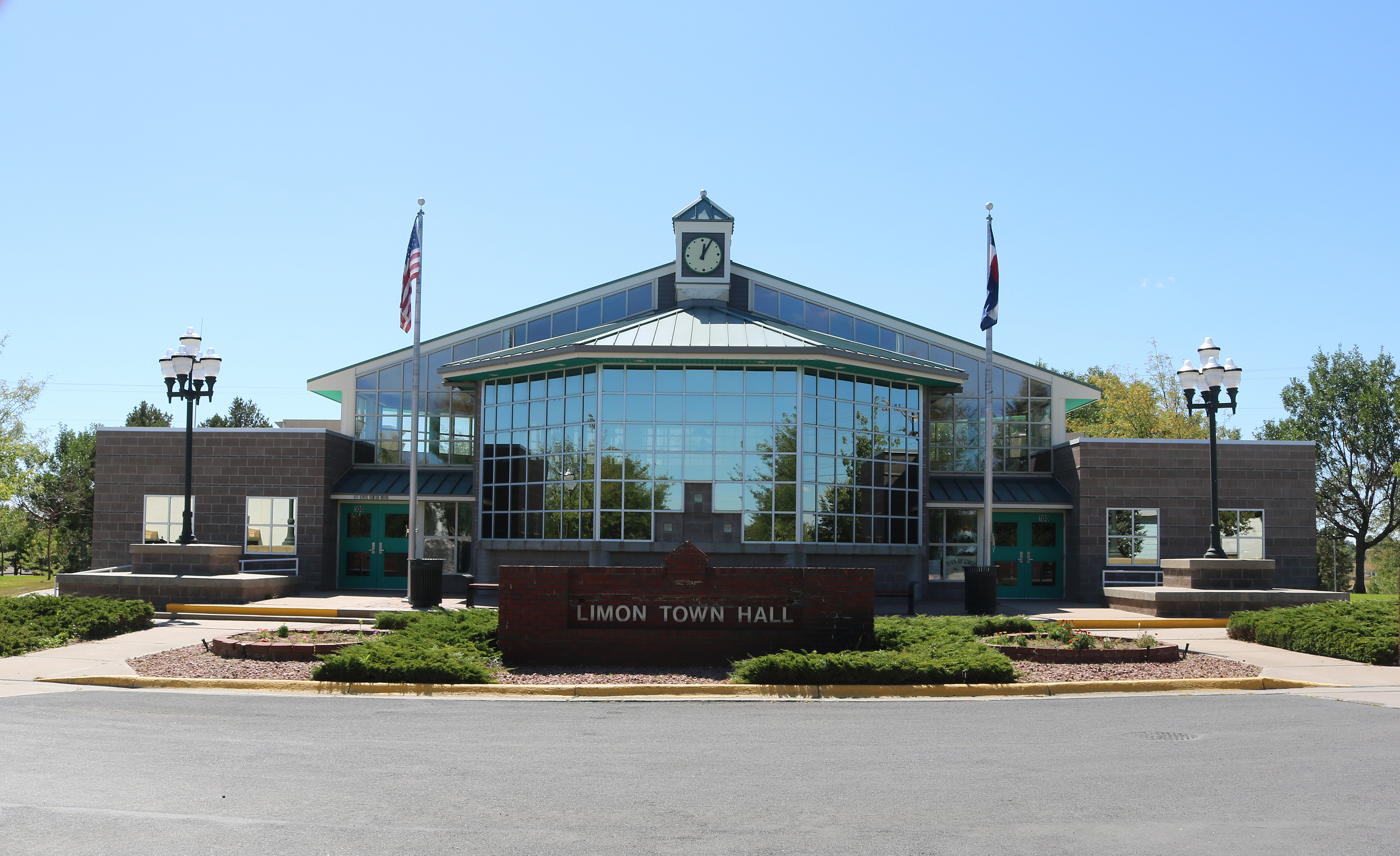
Limon Town Hall (2019)

Railroads were the major factor for Limon's original founding and location. The Kansas Pacific Railroad made its way across the plains from southern Kansas following the Smoky Hill Trail in 1870. In 1888, the Chicago, Rock Island, and Pacific Railroad (now the Kyle Railroad) made its way west to east from Colorado Springs, entering Lincoln County and intersecting the Kansas Pacific (now Union Pacific) at the present day location of Limon. This union of the two railroads was the earliest founding of the "Hub City".

=== Porter lynching ===
Limon was the site of a lynching on November 16, 1900. Preston Porter Jr., a fifteen-year-old African-American male, had confessed under duress to the murder of eleven-year-old Louise Frost who was Caucasian. Porter was apparently being held some 90 miles away in Denver, but was sent back to Limon by request of unspecified people and against the wishes of Sheriff Freeman. When the train carrying Porter stopped in Limon, sixteen men selected from a mob of 300 "marked by calmness and determination" took Porter from Freeman's custody despite the sheriff's protestations "in the name of law." Originally it was announced that Porter would be hanged but many in the crowd including R. W. Frost, the girl's father, objected "that such a death would be too easy." The method was left to Frost who decided upon burning at the stake. Frost also refused to allow mutilation of Porter's body before burning. While waiting for his execution, Porter sat next to a bonfire reading the Gospel of Luke from the Bible. Porter was chained to an iron railroad rail set in the ground on the exact spot where the murder had taken place and burned to death, the match to start the fire being set by the girl's father. Lynchings of this type were apparently rare, as reporters on the scene wrote: "The general sentiment expressed approves the execution of the negro, but deprecates the method adopted."

=== 1990 tornado ===
On June 6, 1990, an F3 tornado touched down near Matheson (about 16 miles west of Limon), tearing roughly east-northeast through fields. Minutes later, the then rain-wrapped tornado arrived, devastating the city. The storm injured 14 people, but remarkably no one was killed. Most of Limon's business district had been laid to ruins in just moments.

Governor Roy Romer declared Limon a disaster area the next day.

Limon rebuilt its business district, adding streetscaping, a new Town Hall, relocating a medical clinic and Limon Memorial Library, and creating Hub City Senior Center and a new fire station.

== Geography ==
Although entirely in Lincoln County, Limon is located immediately east of the Elbert County line. It lies on the north side of Big Sandy Creek, a tributary of the Arkansas River, on the eastern edge of the Colorado Piedmont region of the Great Plains, and is near the eastern end of the Palmer Divide. Located in east-central Colorado at the junction of Interstate 70, U.S. Highway 287, U.S. Highway 40, U.S. Highway 24, and State Highway 71, Limon is far from any major city or town, being 72 miles (116 km) northeast of Colorado Springs and 83 miles (134 km) southeast of Denver.

According to the United States Census Bureau, the town has a total area of 1.9 square miles (4.9 km^{2}), all land.

=== Climate ===
Limon has a semi-arid steppe climate (Köppen BSk) with cold, dry winters and warm, mildly wetter summers. Due to its location on the eastern plains, the town is often subject to severe, sometimes violent thunderstorms throughout the summer. Large hail, damaging winds, heavy rain, and tornadoes are common in the summer months. The high temperature reaches or exceeds 90 °F (32 °C) an average of 32.3 days a year and reaches or exceeds 100 °F (38 °C) an average of 0.8 days a year. The minimum temperature falls below the freezing point 32 °F (0 °C) an average of 195.9 days a year. Typically, the first fall freeze occurs by the fourth week of September, and the last spring freeze occurs by the third week of May. In a typical year, Limon receives 14.97 inches (380 mm) of precipitation, and there are 81.3 days of measurable precipitation. The hottest temperature recorded in Limon was 104 °F (40 °C) on July 20, 2005; the coldest temperature recorded was −28 °F (−33 °C) on February 14, 2021.

Climate data for Limon, Colorado, 1991–2020 normals, extremes 1948–present
Month	Jan	Feb	Mar	Apr	May	Jun	Jul	Aug	Sep	Oct	Nov	Dec	Year
Record high °F (°C)	74 (23)	79 (26)	82 (28)	88 (31)	97 (36)	103 (39)	104 (40)	102 (39)	98 (37)	90 (32)	88 (31)	75 (24)	104 (40)
Mean maximum °F (°C)	64.0 (17.8)	65.4 (18.6)	74.3 (23.5)	80.6 (27.0)	86.8 (30.4)	94.9 (34.9)	97.8 (36.6)	94.7 (34.8)	91.0 (32.8)	83.7 (28.7)	73.8 (23.2)	65.1 (18.4)	98.1 (36.7)
Mean daily maximum °F (°C)	42.7 (5.9)	43.9 (6.6)	53.9 (12.2)	60.5 (15.8)	69.8 (21.0)	81.1 (27.3)	87.2 (30.7)	84.5 (29.2)	77.1 (25.1)	64.1 (17.8)	51.9 (11.1)	42.3 (5.7)	63.2 (17.4)
Daily mean °F (°C)	26.5 (−3.1)	28.2 (−2.1)	37.3 (2.9)	44.3 (6.8)	53.9 (12.2)	64.3 (17.9)	70.4 (21.3)	68.5 (20.3)	59.9 (15.5)	46.7 (8.2)	34.9 (1.6)	26.1 (−3.3)	46.8 (8.2)
Mean daily minimum °F (°C)	10.3 (−12.1)	12.5 (−10.8)	20.6 (−6.3)	28.2 (−2.1)	38.0 (3.3)	47.6 (8.7)	53.6 (12.0)	52.5 (11.4)	42.7 (5.9)	29.3 (−1.5)	17.9 (−7.8)	9.9 (−12.3)	30.3 (−1.0)
Mean minimum °F (°C)	−9.4 (−23.0)	−6.8 (−21.6)	4.9 (−15.1)	14.1 (−9.9)	25.6 (−3.6)	37.2 (2.9)	46.1 (7.8)	44.3 (6.8)	30.6 (−0.8)	13.1 (−10.5)	−0.4 (−18.0)	−8.9 (−22.7)	−14.7 (−25.9)
Record low °F (°C)	−30 (−34)	−28 (−33)	−22 (−30)	−4 (−20)	17 (−8)	26 (−3)	36 (2)	36 (2)	17 (−8)	−9 (−23)	−21 (−29)	−27 (−33)	−30 (−34)
Average precipitation inches (mm)	0.27 (6.9)	0.36 (9.1)	0.80 (20)	1.37 (35)	2.21 (56)	2.20 (56)	2.53 (64)	2.72 (69)	0.96 (24)	0.84 (21)	0.40 (10)	0.31 (7.9)	14.97 (378.9)
Average snowfall inches (cm)	5.7 (14)	5.4 (14)	6.9 (18)	5.0 (13)	1.5 (3.8)	0.0 (0.0)	0.0 (0.0)	0.0 (0.0)	0.2 (0.51)	3.1 (7.9)	8.8 (22)	5.4 (14)	42.0 (107)
Average precipitation days (≥ 0.01 in)	3.9	4.4	6.5	7.9	10.1	8.7	10.3	10.0	5.8	5.4	4.7	3.6	81.3
Average snowy days (≥ 0.1 in)	4.5	4.4	5.5	3.5	0.7	0.0	0.0	0.0	0.4	1.6	4.6	5.1	30.3
Source 1: National Weather Service
Source 2: NOAA (average snowfall/snowy days 1981–2010)

== Demographics ==
Historical population
Census	Pop.	Note	%±
1910	534		—
1920	1,047		96.1%
1930	1,100		5.1%
1940	1,053		−4.3%
1950	1,471		39.7%
1960	1,811		23.1%
1970	1,814		0.2%
1980	1,805		−0.5%
1990	1,831		1.4%
2000	2,071		13.1%
2010	1,880		−9.2%
2020	2,043		8.7%
U.S. Decennial Census

=== 2020 census ===
As of the 2020 census, Limon had a population of 2,043. The median age was 37.3 years. 26.3% of residents were under the age of 18 and 15.6% of residents were 65 years of age or older. For every 100 females there were 98.9 males, and for every 100 females age 18 and over there were 91.7 males age 18 and over.

0.0% of residents lived in urban areas, while 100.0% lived in rural areas.

There were 846 households in Limon, of which 29.8% had children under the age of 18 living in them. Of all households, 41.6% were married-couple households, 22.2% were households with a male householder and no spouse or partner present, and 29.1% were households with a female householder and no spouse or partner present. About 35.0% of all households were made up of individuals and 14.6% had someone living alone who was 65 years of age or older.

There were 942 housing units, of which 10.2% were vacant. The homeowner vacancy rate was 3.4% and the rental vacancy rate was 8.4%.

Racial composition as of the 2020 census
Race	Number	Percent
White	1,646	80.6%
Black or African American	23	1.1%
American Indian and Alaska Native	17	0.8%
Asian	26	1.3%
Native Hawaiian and Other Pacific Islander	21	1.0%
Some other race	114	5.6%
Two or more races	196	9.6%
Hispanic or Latino (of any race)	321	15.7%

=== 2010 census ===
As of the 2010 census, there were 1,880 people, 828 households, and 476 families residing in the town. The population density was 989.5 inhabitants per square mile (382.0/km^{2}). There were 963 housing units at an average density of 506.8 per square mile (195.7/km^{2}). The racial makeup of the town was 93.2% White, 0.9% American Indian, 0.8% African American, 0.8% Asian, 0.1% Pacific Islander, 2.8% from some other race, and 1.5% from two or more races. 9.4% of the population was Hispanic or Latino of any race.

There were 828 households, out of which 32.9% had children under the age of 18 living with them, 41.9% were married couples living together, 4.7% had a male householder with no wife present, 10.9% had a female householder with no husband present, and 42.5% were non-families. 37.1% of all households were made up of individuals, and 18.0% had someone living alone who was 65 years of age or older. The average household size was 2.27, and the average family size was 3.00.

In the town, the population was spread out, with 27.4% under the age of 18, 8.4% from 18 to 24, 23.0% from 25 to 44, 25.0% from 45 to 64, and 16.2% who were 65 years of age or older. The median age was 37.6 years. For every 100 females, there were 90.7 males. For every 100 females age 18 and over, there were 85.6 males age 18 and over.

=== Income and poverty ===
As of 2009, the median income for a household in the town was $40,903, and the median income for a family was $46,061. Males had a median income of $49,097 versus $31,615 for females. The per capita income for the town was $22,442. About 16.6% of families and 18.2% of the population were below the poverty line, including 25.5% of those under age 18 and 4.8% of those age 65 or over.

== Economy ==
The Limon Correctional Facility is part of the Colorado Department of Corrections system and is a major employer in the area with employment of roughly 350.

Limon is the western terminus of the Kyle Railroad and it is here the regional interchanges with the Union Pacific Railroad. Trains previously stopped at Limon Railroad Depot.

== Education ==
=== Limon Schools ===
Limon Schools has a new K-12 facility that opened in the fall of 2015. The $22.5 million project built two stories of new classrooms that accommodate up to 600 students.

Limon Elementary School is a public coed school with 240 students in grades K-5. According to state standards, 82% of students at this school are considered proficient in math or reading.

Limon Junior-Senior High School has 233 students in grades 6–12. According to state standards, 77% of students at this school are considered proficient in reading. Graduation rate is 90%.

=== Morgan Community College ===
Morgan Community College: Limon Center serves Arickaree, Flagler, Genoa-Hugo, Karval, Kit Carson, Limon, and Woodlin high schools. It currently offers A.A., A.S., A.A.S. & A.G.S. degrees; Transfer courses; Nursing pre-requisites; Agriculture & Business Management; GED preparation & testing; Specialty classes for teacher re-licensure; EMS training; and Computer classes.

== Media ==
=== Print ===
The Limon Leader was the city’s weekly newspaper, published by Hoffman Publications, LLC and has a circulation of about 3,200 copies. The last issue was published on October 30, 2025.

=== Radio ===
The following radio stations are licensed to or broadcast from Limon:

AM

Frequency	Callsign	Format	City of License	Notes
1120	KCRN	Adult Contemporary	Limon, Colorado	-

FM

Frequency	Callsign	Format	City of License	Notes
89.1	KYCO		Limon, Colorado	Defunct as of 2013
89.9	K210CC	Public	Limon, Colorado	NPR; Translator of KRCC, Colorado Springs, Colorado
91.9	K220IK	Religious	Limon, Colorado	Translator of KAWZ, Twin Falls, Idaho
93.7	KBUD	Classic Hits	Limon, Colorado	Defunct as of 2016

=== Television ===
Limon is in the Denver television market.

== Transportation ==
=== Highways ===
Limon is connected by Interstate 70 east to Kansas and west to Denver. The Ports-to-Plains Corridor, including US 40/287 south and Colorado Highway 71 to the north, connects to Texas and South Dakota. Proposals for Interstate 27 follow US 287 southwards and the Heartland Expressway northwards.

Colorado State Highway 71 connects south from Limon to Pueblo. U.S. Route 24 is a direct passage southwest from Limon to Colorado Springs.

=== Railroads ===
Limon is served by the Union Pacific Railroad and the Kyle Railroad, a short-line railroad owned by Genesee & Wyoming, Inc. The Kyle Railroad runs from North Central Kansas into Eastern Colorado with Limon as the western terminus where it interchanges with the Union Pacific Railroad.

=== Aviation ===
The Town of Limon is 83 miles (134 km) from Denver International Airport, the largest airport in the state. Colorado Springs Airport is located about 74 miles (119 km) from Limon.

Limon Municipal Airport is a public use airport located at the eastern edge of town. The airport encompasses approximately 397 acres (161 ha) and is owned and operated by the town government. The general aviation airport utilized by a range of aircraft ranging from single-engine aircraft up to small sized multi-engine business jets.

== See also ==
- Cedar Point Village, an archaeological site
