= Breckenridge STOLport =

- IATA: none; ICAO: none

Summary
- Airport type: STOLport
- Serves: Breckenridge, Colorado
- Elevation AMSL: 9,401 ft / 2,865 m

Runways
Direction	Length		Surface
Direction	ft	m	Surface
16/34	4,600	1,402	unpaved

Breckenridge STOLport was a private airport located in Breckenridge, Colorado. Due to its location at 9,401 feet (2,865 m) in elevation, the airport was considered a short takeoff and landing field, limiting the size and weight of aircraft that could use it. The airport was established between 1960 and 1963 as Hanson Airfield, serving private pilots. Numerous attempts were made by proponents for commercial aviation to establish a public airport at Breckenridge STOLport, but none of them were successful. The last aircraft to use the airport was to avoid poor weather in 2005. Since then, the site of the airport has been repurposed for the construction of an elementary school, housing, and parking for Breckenridge Ski Resort visitors. The only remaining evidence of the airport's existence is Airport Road, which parallels the site.

== Accidents and incidents ==
In 1977, a Beechcraft Bonanza crashed shortly after take-off due to being overloaded and under-powered for the high altitude. There were four injuries and no fatalities.
