= Breckenridge, Colorado =

Home-rule town and seat of Summit County, Colorado, United States

- Home rule town
- Town of Breckenridge
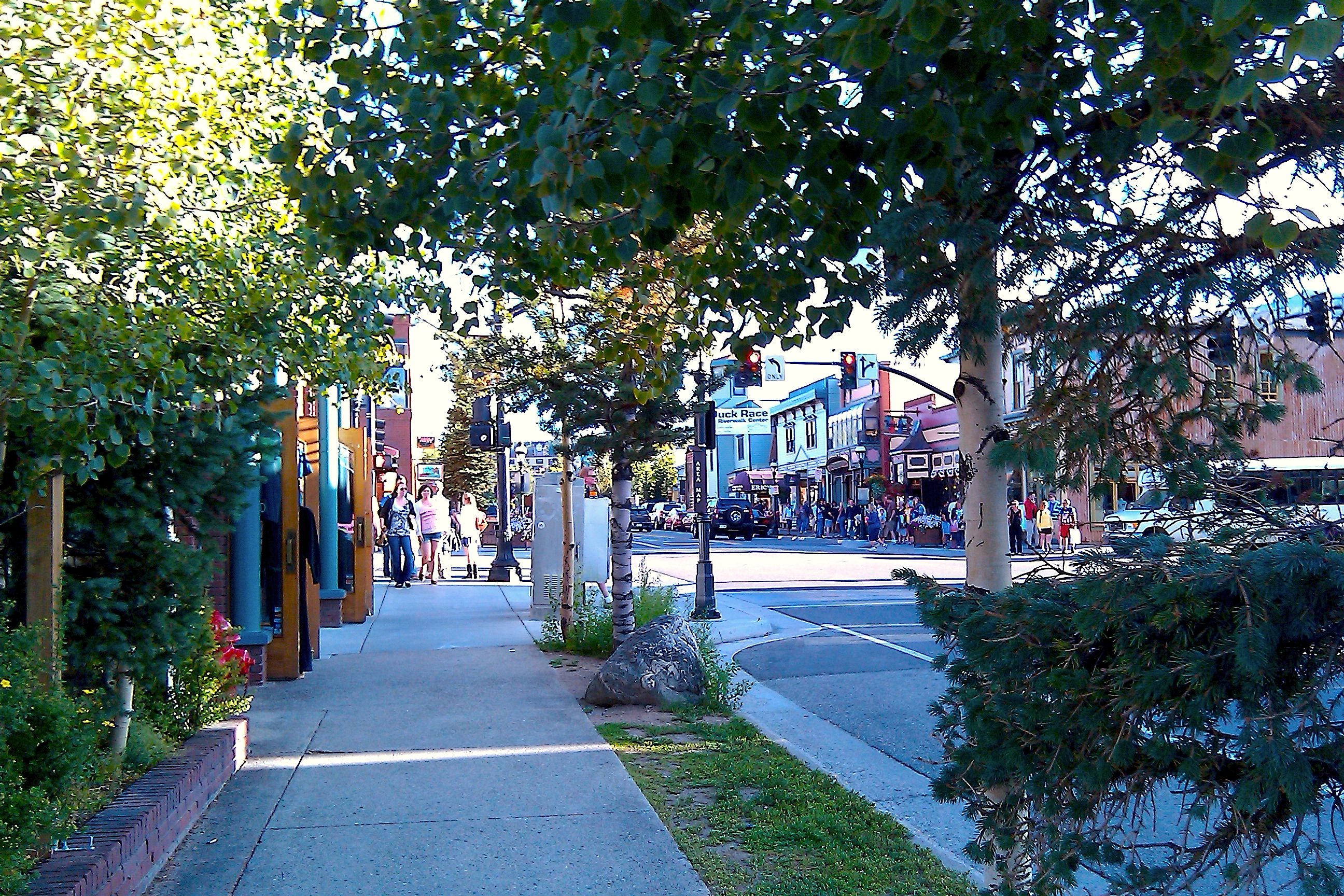
- Main Street in Breckenridge

- Seal
- Interactive map of Breckenridge, Colorado
- Coordinates: 39°30′35″N 106°02′24″W
- Country: United States
- State: Colorado
- County: Summit
- Founded: November 1859 as Breckinridge
- Incorporated: March 3, 1880
- Named after: Thomas E. Breckenridge

Government
  - Type: home rule town

Area
  - Home rule town: 6.041 sq mi (15.646 km^{2})
  - Land: 6.041 sq mi (15.646 km^{2})
  - Water: 0 sq mi (0.000 km^{2}) 0.0%
- Elevation: 9,728 ft (2,965 m)

Population (2020)
  - Home rule town: 5,078
  - Density: 840.6/sq mi (324.6/km^{2})
  - Urban: 8,725
- Time zone: UTC−07:00 (MST)
  - Summer (DST): UTC−06:00 (MDT)
- ZIP code: 80424
- Area codes: 303/720/983
- GNIS town ID: 2411722
- FIPS code: 08-08400
- Website: townofbreckenridge.com

Breckenridge is the home rule town that is the county seat of Summit County, Colorado, United States. The population was 5,078 at the 2020 census.

Breckenridge is the principal town of the Breckenridge, CO Micropolitan Statistical Area. The town also has many part-time residents, as many people have vacation homes in the area. The town is located at the base of the Tenmile Range.

Since ski trails were first cut in 1961, Breckenridge Ski Resort has made the town a popular destination for skiers. Summer in Breckenridge attracts outdoor enthusiasts with hiking trails, wildflowers, fly fishing in the Blue River, mountain biking, nearby Lake Dillon for boating, white-water rafting, three alpine slides, a roller coaster, and many shops and restaurants up and down Main Street. The historic buildings along Main Street with their clapboard and log exteriors add to the charm of the town. Since 1981, Breckenridge has hosted the Breckenridge Festival of Film in September, while in January, the town has often been host to a screening of the Backcountry Film Festival. Also held in December is Ullr Fest, a week of festivities celebrating snow and honoring the Norse god Ullr. There are many summertime attractions to enjoy in Breckenridge, most notably the annual Fourth of July parade.

== History ==
=== Name ===
The first prospectors in the area built a stockade known as Fort Mary B named after Mary Bigelow, who was the only woman in the party. The town of Breckenridge was founded in November 1859 and named for prospector Thomas Breckenridge. General George E. Spencer persuaded the citizens to change the spelling of the town's name to Breckinridge in honor of U.S. Vice President John Cabell Breckinridge in the hopes of gaining a post office. Spencer succeeded in his plan and on January 18, 1860, the Breckinridge post office became the first U.S. post office between the Continental Divide and Salt Lake City. Thirty days after John Breckinridge accepted a commission as a brigadier general in the Confederate States Army on November 2, 1861, the loyal Union town changed its name back to the original Breckenridge on December 2, 1861.

=== Discovery ===
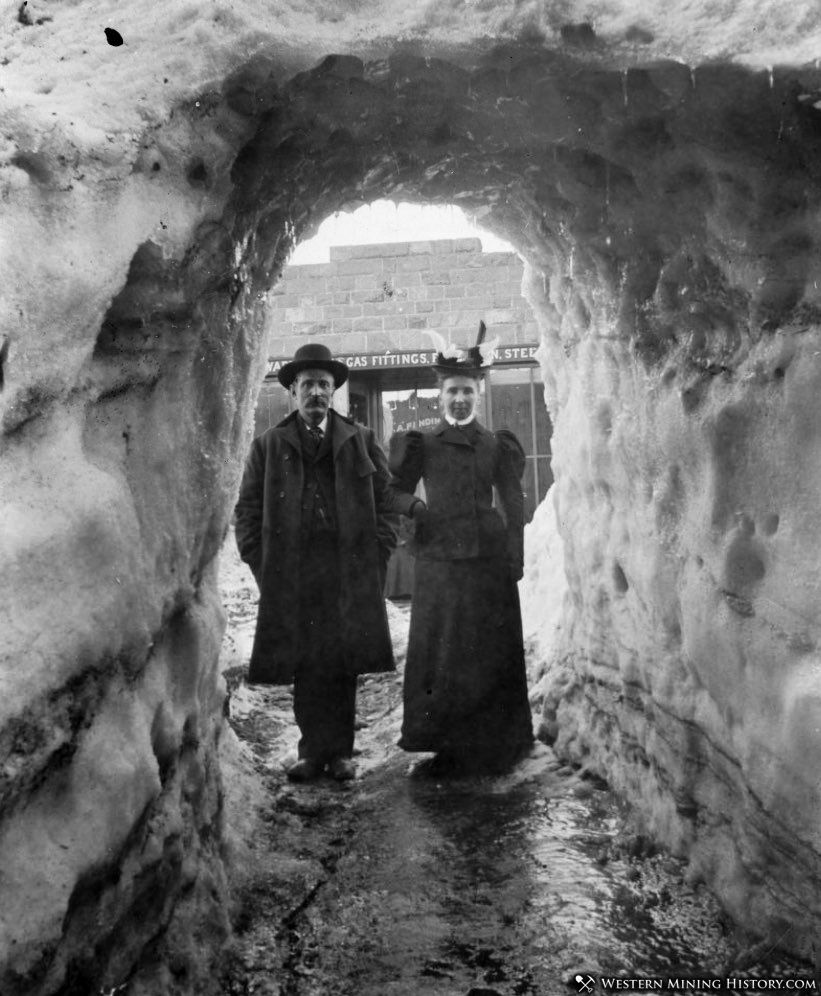
Snow tunnel in Breckenridge, 1898. The winter of 1898–99 was extremely harsh. The trains could not run, and supplies were running short.

Prospectors entered what is now Summit County (then part of Utah Territory) during the Pikes Peak Gold Rush of 1859, soon after the placer gold discoveries east of Breckenridge near Idaho Springs. Breckenridge was founded to serve the miners working rich placer gold deposits discovered along the Blue River. Placer gold mining was soon joined by hard rock mining, as prospectors followed the gold to its source veins in the hills. Gold in some upper gravel benches east of the Blue River was recovered by hydraulic mining. Gold production decreased in the late 1800s, but revived in 1908 by gold dredging operations along the Blue River and Swan River. The Breckenridge mining district is credited with production of about one million troy ounces (about 31,000 kilograms) of gold. The gold mines around Breckenridge are all shut down, although some are open to tourist visits. The characteristic gravel ridges left by the gold dredges can still be seen along the Blue River and Snake River, and the remains of a dredge are still afloat in a pond off the Swan River.

Notable among the early prospectors was Edwin Carter, a log cabin naturalist who decided to switch from mining to collecting wildlife specimens. His log cabin, built in 1875, still stands today and has been recently renovated by the Breckenridge Heritage Alliance with interactive exhibits and a small viewing room with a short creative film on his life and the early days around Breckenridge.

Harry Farncomb found the source of the French Gulch placer gold on Farncomb Hill in 1878. His strike, Wire Patch, consisted of alluvial gold in wire, leaf and crystalline forms. By 1880, he owned the hill. Farncomb later discovered a gold vein, which became the Wire Patch Mine. Other vein discoveries included Ontario, Key West, Boss, Fountain, and Gold Flake.

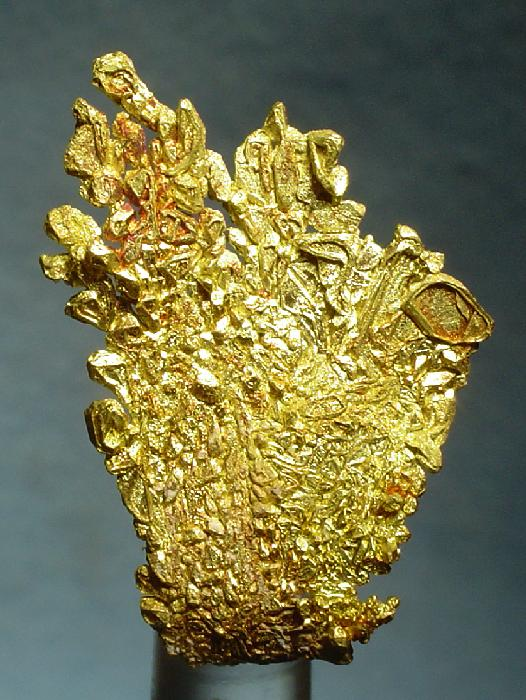
Gold specimen from Farncomb Hill, Breckenridge

The Town of Breckenridge was incorporated on March 3, 1880. The Breckenridge Heritage Alliance reports that in the 1930s, a women's group in Breckenridge stumbled upon an 1880s map that failed to include Breckenridge. They speculated that Breckenridge had never been officially annexed into the United States, and was thus still considered "No Man's Land". This was completely false—official US maps did include Breckenridge—but these women created an incredibly clever marketing campaign out of this one map. In 1936 they invited the Governor of Colorado to Breckenridge to raise a flag at the Courthouse officially welcoming Breckenridge into the union—and he came. There was a big party, and the entire event/idea of Breckenridge being left off the map made national news. The "No Man's Land" idea later morphed into a new theme of Breckenridge being referred to as "Colorado's Kingdom", and the theme of the town's independent spirit is still celebrated to today during the annual "Kingdom Days" celebrations every June.

In December 1961, skiing was introduced to Breckenridge when several trails were cut on the lower part of Peak 8, connected to town by Ski Hill Road. In the ensuing decades, the ski area was gradually expanded onto adjacent peaks, with trails opening on Peak 9 in the early 1970s, Peak 10 in 1985, Peak 7 in 2002, and Peak 6 in 2013.

On November 3, 2009, voters passed ballot measure 2F by a nearly 3 to 1 margin (73%), which legalized marijuana possession for adults. The measure allows possession of up to an ounce of marijuana and also decriminalizes the possession of marijuana-related paraphernalia. Possession became legal January 1, 2010. Possession was still illegal by state law, however, until the passage of Colorado Amendment 64 in 2012.

== Geography ==
According to the United States Census Bureau, the town has a total area of 6.041 square miles (15.65 km^{2}), all land. The ski area has a total area of 2,880 acres (11.7 km^{2}) of land. The elevation of Breckenridge is 9,601 feet (2,926 m) above sea level.

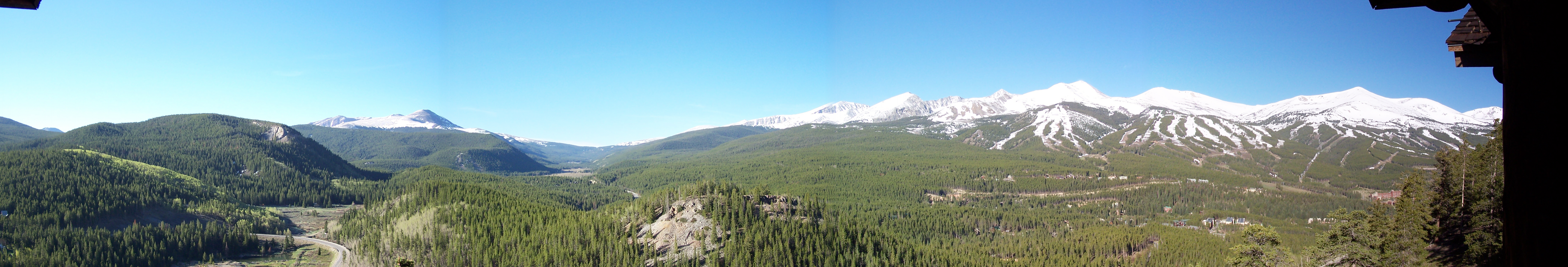
A spring panorama of Breckenridge

=== Climate ===
Breckenridge's climate is considered to be high-alpine with the tree line at 11,500 feet (3,500 m). The average humidity remains around 30% throughout the year. At the elevation of the weather station, the climate could be described as a subalpine climate (Köppen Dfc) since summer means are above 50 °F (10 °C) in spite of the very cool mornings. Winter lows are quite severe, but afternoons averaging around the freezing mark somewhat moderate mean temperatures.

A weather station was run in the town from 1893 to 1913, and from 1948 to the present day. However, temperature measurements are mostly confined to the first period, and the temperature record is thus very sparse. Even so, a temperature of freezing or below was recorded for every single date of the year except July 26. During the winter of 1898–1899, snow was reported to fall for a record 79 consecutive days. Residents tunneled through the snow to navigate Main Street.

Climate data for Breckenridge, Colorado, 1991–2020 normals, extremes 1893–1978
Month	Jan	Feb	Mar	Apr	May	Jun	Jul	Aug	Sep	Oct	Nov	Dec	Year
Record high °F (°C)	72 (22)	71 (22)	61 (16)	69 (21)	78 (26)	84 (29)	86 (30)	90 (32)	86 (30)	77 (25)	69 (21)	60 (16)	90 (32)
Mean daily maximum °F (°C)	29.7 (−1.3)	30.4 (−0.9)	36.9 (2.7)	44.4 (6.9)	53.4 (11.9)	65.2 (18.4)	70.2 (21.2)	70.3 (21.3)	63.9 (17.7)	51.8 (11.0)	40.7 (4.8)	30.4 (−0.9)	48.9 (9.4)
Daily mean °F (°C)	15.1 (−9.4)	15.9 (−8.9)	22.5 (−5.3)	30.6 (−0.8)	39.1 (3.9)	48.4 (9.1)	53.8 (12.1)	53.4 (11.9)	46.5 (8.1)	36.0 (2.2)	25.4 (−3.7)	15.4 (−9.2)	33.5 (0.8)
Mean daily minimum °F (°C)	0.2 (−17.7)	1.1 (−17.2)	8.4 (−13.1)	16.5 (−8.6)	24.8 (−4.0)	31.7 (−0.2)	37.3 (2.9)	36.6 (2.6)	29.1 (−1.6)	20.1 (−6.6)	10.0 (−12.2)	0.3 (−17.6)	18.0 (−7.8)
Record low °F (°C)	−40 (−40)	−37 (−38)	−25 (−32)	−16 (−27)	−6 (−21)	12 (−11)	20 (−7)	22 (−6)	7 (−14)	−11 (−24)	−26 (−32)	−36 (−38)	−40 (−40)
Average precipitation inches (mm)	1.73 (44)	1.88 (48)	2.03 (52)	2.46 (62)	1.97 (50)	1.16 (29)	2.45 (62)	2.24 (57)	1.53 (39)	1.35 (34)	1.45 (37)	1.52 (39)	21.77 (553)
Average snowfall inches (cm)	27.7 (70)	27.7 (70)	27.6 (70)	28.0 (71)	9.5 (24)	0.8 (2.0)	0.0 (0.0)	0.0 (0.0)	2.2 (5.6)	13.6 (35)	23.7 (60)	23.8 (60)	184.6 (467.6)
Average precipitation days (≥ 0.01 in)	12.7	12.3	12.5	12.8	10.3	8.2	13.4	14.4	10.0	8.6	10.1	11.1	136.4
Average snowy days (≥ 0.1 in)	12.5	12.2	12.0	11.3	4.4	0.6	0.0	0.0	1.0	5.7	9.7	11.1	80.5
Source 1: National Weather Service (average daily high/mean/low 1893–1978)
Source 2: NOAA

== Demographics ==
Historical population
Census	Pop.	Note	%±
1870	51		—
1880	1,657		3,149.0%
1900	976		—
1910	834		−14.5%
1920	796		−4.6%
1930	436		−45.2%
1940	381		−12.6%
1950	296		−22.3%
1960	393		32.8%
1970	548		39.4%
1980	818		49.3%
1990	1,285		57.1%
2000	2,408		87.4%
2010	4,540		88.5%
2020	5,078		11.9%
2024 (est.)	4,892	▼	−3.7%
U.S. Decennial Census; 2020 Census

=== 2020 census ===
As of the 2020 census, Breckenridge had a population of 5,078. The median age was 37.4 years. 14.1% of residents were under the age of 18 and 11.7% of residents were 65 years of age or older. For every 100 females there were 116.5 males, and for every 100 females age 18 and over there were 118.5 males age 18 and over.

98.5% of residents lived in urban areas, while 1.5% lived in rural areas.

There were 2,275 households in Breckenridge, of which 21.0% had children under the age of 18 living in them. Of all households, 41.7% were married-couple households, 28.0% were households with a male householder and no spouse or partner present, and 19.8% were households with a female householder and no spouse or partner present. About 27.3% of all households were made up of individuals and 6.3% had someone living alone who was 65 years of age or older.

There were 7,364 housing units, of which 69.1% were vacant. The homeowner vacancy rate was 2.5% and the rental vacancy rate was 37.3%.

Racial composition as of the 2020 census
Race	Number	Percent
White	4,310	84.9%
Black or African American	35	0.7%
American Indian and Alaska Native	18	0.4%
Asian	86	1.7%
Native Hawaiian and Other Pacific Islander	5	0.1%
Some other race	285	5.6%
Two or more races	339	6.7%
Hispanic or Latino (of any race)	555	10.9%

=== 2000 census ===
As of the 2000 census, there were 2,408 people, 1,081 households, and 380 families residing in the town. The population density was 486.4 inhabitants per square mile (187.8/km^{2}). There were 4,270 housing units at an average density of 862.6 per square mile (333.1/km^{2}). The racial makeup of the town was 95.56% White, 0.37% African American, 0.33% Native American, 1.04% Asian, 0.04% Pacific Islander, 1.12% from some other races and 1.54% from two or more races. Hispanic or Latino people of any race were 5.44% of the population.

There were 1,081 households, out of which 13.4% had children under the age of 18 living with them, 27.9% were married couples living together, 4.3% had a female householder with no husband present, and 64.8% were non-families. 28.7% of all households were made up of individuals, and 0.8% had someone living alone who was 65 years of age or older. The average household size was 2.16 and the average family size was 2.61.

In the town, the population was spread out, with 11.1% under the age of 18, 22.8% from 18 to 24, 45.3% from 25 to 44, 18.7% from 45 to 64, and 2.1% who were 65 years of age or older. The median age was 29 years. For every 100 females, there were 160.9 males. For every 100 females age 18 and over, there were 164.2 males.

The median income for a household in the town was $43,938, and the median income for a family was $52,212. Males had a median income of $29,571 versus $27,917 for females. The per capita income for the town was $29,675. About 5.2% of families and 8.8% of the population were below the poverty line, including 1.7% of those under age 18 and none of those age 65 or over.

== Events ==
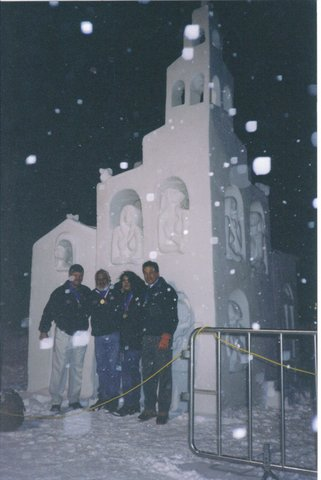
Mexican sculptor Abel Ramírez Águilar posing with other members of team at the International Snow Sculpture Championships in 1999

Breckenridge holds public events throughout the year.

=== Winter ===
Every January, the International Snow Sculpture Championships are held in Breckenridge, where sculptors from around the world compete to create works of art from twenty-ton blocks of snow. The annual winter Ullr Fest parade pays homage to the Norse god of snow Ullr. The Backcountry Film Fest began in the 21st century, which happens in January. That is held about the same time as the Ullr Fest.

Since winter of 2008–2009, the Freeway Terrain Park on Peak 8 hosts the Winter Dew Tour in December, featuring the biggest names in extreme snowboarding and skiing. Other events held on the mountain include the annual Imperial Challenge, Breck's version of a triathlon, The 5 Peaks, North America's longest ski mountaineering race, the Breck Ascent Series, with races up the mountain, as well as other competitions, festivals, and the annual Spring Fever month-long celebration at the end of the ski season with festivities and other celebrations around spring skiing.

=== Summer and fall ===
During the summer, Breckenridge is host to the National Repertory Orchestra and the Breckenridge Music Institute. Concerts are scheduled three to four nights a week. Full orchestra, ensembles, and contemporary artists perform at the Riverwalk Center, downtown near the Blue River. Several art fairs come to Breckenridge every summer, attracting many local artists and buyers. The town also puts on an annual Fourth of July celebration, featuring a parade in the morning and fireworks at night. In September each year since 1981, the Breckenridge Festival of film is held.

== Notable people ==
Notable individuals who were born in or have lived in Breckenridge include:

- Pat Ahern (1961–present), U.S. Olympic Nordic combined skier
- Edwin Carter (c.1830–1900), miner, naturalist
- Jeff Cravath (1903–1953), football coach
- Barney Ford (1822–1902), Colorado businessman and civil-rights pioneer
- Arielle Gold (1996–present), Olympic bronze medalist snowboarder
- Taylor Gold (1993–present), Olympic snowboarder
- Al Jourgensen (1958–present), singer-songwriter, producer
- Heather McPhie (1984–present), U.S. Olympic freestyle/moguls skier
- Monique Merrill (1969–present), mountain biker, ski mountaineer
- J. R. Moehringer (1964–present), novelist, reporter
- Helen Rich (1894–1971), novelist and journalist
- Betsy Sodaro (1984–present), actress, comedian
- Pete Swenson (1967–present), ski mountaineer
- Belle Turnbull (1881–1970), poet
- Katie Uhlaender (1984–present), U.S. Olympic skeleton racer

== See also ==
- Breckenridge, CO Micropolitan Statistical Area
- Breckenridge STOLport
