= KBUD (FM) =

Deer Trail, Colorado; United States
- Frequency: 93.7 MHz

Programming
- Format: Defunct (formerly Oldies)

Ownership
- Owner: Victor Michael, Jr.; (Kona Coast Radio, LLC)

History
- First air date: December 5, 2001
- Former call signs: KLIM-FM (2001–2003); KIIQ (2003–2015); KVAM (2015–2016)

Technical information
- Facility ID: 85056
- Class: A
- ERP: 1,000 watts
- HAAT: −32 meters (−105 ft)
- Transmitter coordinates: 39°16′0″N 103°41′15″W

KBUD (93.7 FM) was a radio station licensed to Deer Trail, Colorado, United States. The station was owned by Victor Michael, Jr., through licensee Kona Coast Radio, LLC.

== History ==
The station was assigned the call letters KLIM-FM on December 5, 2001. The station changed its call sign to KIIQ on May 19, 2003, to DKIIQ on June 24, 2005, and back to KIIQ on November 2, 2007. The call letters changed to KVAM on July 2, 2015, and to KBUD on April 11, 2016.

== Construction permit ==
On April 6, 2015, the then-KIIQ was granted a U.S. Federal Communications Commission (FCC) construction permit to upgrade to a Class C2 FM with 25.5 kW, and change its city of license from Limon, Colorado to Deer Trail, Colorado, where it planned to enter the Denver market as a rimshot. KBUD was licensed for the move to Deer Trail on April 14, 2016.

Kona Coast Radio surrendered the station's license to the FCC on April 18, 2016; the FCC cancelled the license on April 19, 2016.
