= List of airports in Kansas =

This is a list of airports in Kansas (a U.S. state), grouped by type and sorted by location. It contains all public-use and military airports in the state. Some private-use and former airports may be included where notable, such as airports that were previously public-use, those with commercial enplanements recorded by the FAA or airports assigned an IATA airport code.

The largest airport located in the state is Wichita Dwight D. Eisenhower National Airport, a Class C airport.

== Airports ==
This list contains the following information:

- **City served** – The city generally associated with the airport, as per the airport's master record with the Federal Aviation Administration. This is not always the actual location since some airports are located in smaller towns outside of the city they serve. It is not meant to be a complete list of cities served, which can be found in or added to each airport's Wikipedia article.
- **FAA** – The location identifier assigned by the Federal Aviation Administration (FAA). These are linked to each airport's page at the Kansas Department of Transportation.
- **IATA** – The airport code assigned by the International Air Transport Association (IATA). Those that do not match the FAA code are shown in bold.
- **ICAO** – The location indicator assigned by the International Civil Aviation Organization (ICAO).
- **Airport name** – The official airport name. Those shown in **bold** indicate the airport has scheduled passenger service on commercial airlines.
- **Role** – One of four FAA airport categories, as per the 2021–2025 National Plan of Integrated Airport Systems (NPIAS) report released September 2020:
  - P-s: Commercial service – primary are publicly owned airports that receive scheduled passenger service and have more than 10,000 passenger boardings (enplanements) each year. Each primary airport is sub-classified by the FAA as one of the following four "hub" types (s):
    - L: Large hub that accounts for at least 1% of total U.S. passenger enplanements.
    - M: Medium hub that accounts for between 0.25% and 1% of total U.S. passenger enplanements.
    - S: Small hub that accounts for between 0.05% and 0.25% of total U.S. passenger enplanements.
    - N: Nonhub that accounts for less than 0.05% of total U.S. passenger enplanements, but more than 10,000 annual enplanements.
  - CS: Commercial service – nonprimary are publicly owned airports that receive scheduled passenger service and have at least 2,500 passenger boardings each year.
  - R: Reliever airports are designated by the FAA to relieve congestion at a large commercial service airport and to provide more general aviation access to the overall community.
  - GA: General aviation airports are the largest single group of airports in the U.S. airport system. They are public-use airports that do not have scheduled service or have scheduled service with less than 2,500 passenger boardings each year.
- **Enplanements** – The number of enplanements (commercial passenger boardings) that occurred at the airport in calendar year 2024, as per FAA records released 2025.

City served	FAA	IATA	ICAO	Airport name	Role	Enplanements (2024)
				**Commercial service – primary airports**		
Garden City	GCK	GCK	KGCK	**Garden City Regional Airport**	P-N	31,167
Hays	HYS	HYS	KHYS	**Hays Regional Airport**	P-N	15,002
Manhattan	MHK	MHK	KMHK	**Manhattan Regional Airport**	P-N	85,901
Salina	SLN	SLN	KSLN	**Salina Regional Airport**	P-N	23,456
Wichita	ICT	ICT	KICT	**Wichita Dwight D. Eisenhower National Airport** (was Wichita Mid-Continent Airport)	P-S	885,585
				**Commercial service – nonprimary airports**		
Dodge City	DDC	DDC	KDDC	**Dodge City Regional Airport**	CS	8,300
Liberal	LBL	LBL	KLBL	**Liberal Mid-America Regional Airport** (was Liberal Municipal Airport)	CS	8,181
				**Reliever airports**		
Newton	EWK	EWK	KEWK	Newton-City-County Airport	R	0
Olathe	OJC	OJC	KOJC	Johnson County Executive Airport	R	27
Olathe	IXD	**JCI**	KIXD	New Century AirCenter	R	17
Wichita	AAO		KAAO	Colonel James Jabara Airport	R	15
				**General aviation airports**		
Abilene	K78			Abilene Municipal Airport	GA	0
Anthony	ANY	ANY	KANY	Anthony Municipal Airport	GA	0
Atchison	K59			Amelia Earhart Airport	GA	0
Atwood	ADT		KADT	Atwood–Rawlins County City–County Airport	GA	0
Augusta	3AU			Augusta Municipal Airport	GA	0
Belleville	RPB		KRPB	Belleville Municipal Airport	GA	0
Beloit	K61			Moritz Memorial Airport	GA	0
Burlington	UKL		KUKL	Coffey County Airport	GA	0
Chanute	CNU	CNU	KCNU	Chanute Martin Johnson Airport	GA	0
Cimarron	8K8			Cimarron Municipal Airport	GA	0
Clay Center	CYW		KCYW	Clay Center Municipal Airport	GA	0
Coffeyville	CFV	CFV	KCFV	Coffeyville Municipal Airport	GA	0
Colby	CBK	CBK	KCBK	Shalz Field (Colby Municipal Airport)	GA	7
Concordia	CNK	CNK	KCNK	Blosser Municipal Airport	GA	0
El Dorado	EQA	**EDK**	KEQA	El Dorado/Captain Jack Thomas Memorial Airport	GA	0
Elkhart	EHA		KEHA	Elkhart–Morton County Airport	GA	0
Ellsworth	9K7			Ellsworth Municipal Airport	GA	0
Emporia	EMP	EMP	KEMP	Emporia Municipal Airport	GA	4
Eureka	13K			Lt. William M. Milliken Airport	GA	0
Fort Scott	FSK	FSK	KFSK	Fort Scott Municipal Airport	GA	0
Gardner	K34			Gardner Municipal Airport	GA	0
Garnett	K68			Garnett Municipal Airport	GA	0
Goodland	GLD	GLD	KGLD	Goodland Municipal Airport (Renner Field)	GA	0
Great Bend	GBD	GBD	KGBD	Great Bend Municipal Airport	GA	3
Herington	HRU		KHRU	Herington Regional Airport (was Herington Municipal Airport)	GA	0
Hill City	HLC	HLC	KHLC	Hill City Municipal Airport	GA	0
Hugoton	HQG		KHQG	Hugoton Municipal Airport	GA	0
Hutchinson	HUT	HUT	KHUT	Hutchinson Regional Airport	GA	82
Independence	IDP	IDP	KIDP	Independence Municipal Airport	GA	0
Iola	K88			Allen County Airport	GA	0
Johnson City	JHN		KJHN	Stanton County Municipal Airport	GA	0
Junction City	3JC			Freeman Field	GA	0
Kingman	9K8			Kingman Airport (Clyde Cessna Field)	GA	0
Lakin	36K			Kearny County Airport	GA	0
Larned	LQR		KLQR	Larned–Pawnee County Airport	GA	0
Lawrence	LWC	LWC	KLWC	Lawrence Regional Airport	GA	4
Leoti	3K7			Mark Hoard Memorial Airport	GA	0
Lyons	LYO	LYO	KLYO	Lyons–Rice County Municipal Airport	GA	0
Marysville	MYZ		KMYZ	Marysville Municipal Airport	GA	0
McPherson	MPR	MPR	KMPR	McPherson Airport	GA	0
Meade	MEJ		KMEJ	Meade Municipal Airport	GA	0
Medicine Lodge	K51			Medicine Lodge Airport	GA	0
Ness City	48K			Ness City Municipal Airport	GA	0
Norton	NRN		KNRN	Norton Municipal Airport	GA	0
Oakley	OEL		KOEL	Oakley Municipal Airport	GA	0
Oberlin	OIN		KOIN	Oberlin Municipal Airport	GA	0
Osage City	53K			Osage City Municipal Airport	GA	0
Oswego	K67			Oswego Municipal Airport	GA	0
Ottawa	OWI		KOWI	Ottawa Municipal Airport	GA	0
Paola	K81			Miami County Airport	GA	0
Parsons	PPF	PPF	KPPF	Tri-City Airport	GA	4
Phillipsburg	PHG		KPHG	Phillipsburg Municipal Airport	GA	0
Pittsburg	PTS	PTS	KPTS	Atkinson Municipal Airport	GA	0
Pratt	PTT	PTT	KPTT	Pratt Regional Airport (was Pratt Industrial Airport)	GA	0
Russell	RSL	RSL	KRSL	Russell Municipal Airport	GA	0
Sabetha	K83			Sabetha Municipal Airport	GA	0
St. Francis	SYF		KSYF	Cheyenne County Municipal Airport	GA	0
Satanta	1K9			Satanta Municipal Airport	GA	0
Scott City	TQK		KTQK	Scott City Municipal Airport	GA	0
Smith Center	K82			Smith Center Municipal Airport	GA	0
Stockton	RCP		KRCP	Rooks County Regional Airport	GA	0
Syracuse	3K3			Syracuse–Hamilton County Municipal Airport	GA	0
Topeka	TOP	TOP	KTOP	Philip Billard Municipal Airport	GA	0
Topeka	FOE	FOE	KFOE	Topeka Regional Airport (was Forbes Field)	GA	4,803
Tribune	5K2			Tribune Municipal Airport	GA	0
Ulysses	ULS		KULS	Ulysses Airport	GA	0
WaKeeney	0H1			Trego WaKeeney Airport	GA	0
Wellington	EGT		KEGT	Wellington Municipal Airport	GA	0
Winfield / Arkansas City	WLD	WLD	KWLD	Strother Field	GA	0
				**Other public-use airports** (not listed in NPIAS)		
Argonia	2K8			Argonia Municipal Airport		
Ashland	K58			Harold Krier Field		
Baldwin City	K64			Vinland Valley Aerodrome		
Beaumont	07S			Beaumont Hotel Airport		
Benton	1K1			Lloyd Stearman Field (Benton Airpark)		
Bird City	5K0			Bressler Field		
Bucklin	8K0			Bucklin Airport		
Caldwell	01K			Caldwell Municipal Airport		
Coldwater	3K8			Comanche County Airport		
Cottonwood Falls	9K0			Cottonwood Falls Airport (was Chase County Airport)		
Council Grove	K63			Council Grove Municipal Airport		
Dighton	K65			Dighton Airport		
El Dorado	9K6			Patty Field		
Ellinwood	1K6			Ellinwood Municipal Airport		
Erie	11K			Squadron Field		
Fowler	18K			Fowler Airport		
Fredonia	1K7			Fredonia Airport		
Greensburg	9KS			Greensburg Municipal Airport		
Harper	8K2			Harper Municipal Airport		
Hiawatha	K87			Hiawatha Municipal Airport		
Hillsboro	M66			Alfred Schroeder Field		
Horton	K91			Horton Municipal Airport		
Hoxie	1F5			Hoxie–Sheridan County Airport		
Ingalls	30K			Ingalls Municipal Airport		
Jetmore	K79			Jetmore Municipal Airport		
Kinsley	33K			Kinsley Municipal Airport		
Kiowa	4KS			Walz Airport		
La Crosse	K94			Rush County Airport		
Lincoln	K71			Lincoln Municipal Airport		
Lucas	38K			Lucas Airport		
Lyndon	39K			Versaair Services Airport		
Lyons	8KS			Maxwell Aviation Airport		
Mankato	TKO		KTKO	Mankato Airport		
Marion	43K			Marion Municipal Airport		
Minneapolis	45K			Minneapolis City County Airport		
Moline	2K6			Elk County Airport		
Montezuma	K17			Montezuma Municipal Airport		
Moundridge	47K			Moundridge Municipal Airport		
Neodesha	2K7			Neodesha Municipal Airport		
Norwich	49K			Norwich Airport		
Olathe	51K			Cedar Air Park		
Onaga	52K			Charles E. Grutzmacher Municipal Airport		
Osborne	K75			Osborne Municipal Airport		
Oxford	55K			Oxford Municipal Airport		
Pleasanton	1KS			Linn County Airport		
Plains	2KS5			Plains Municipal Airport		
Prairie View	0P1			Van Pak Airport		
Quinter	1QK			Gove County Airport		
Rose Hill	K50			Cook Airfield		
Sedan	61K			Sedan City Airport		
Seneca	62K			Seneca Municipal Airport		
Stafford	3TA			Stafford Municipal Airport		
Stilwell	63K			Hillside Airport		
Sublette	19S			Sublette Municipal Airport (was Sublette Flying Club Airport)		
Wamego	69K			Wamego Municipal Airport		
Washington	K38			Washington County Veteran's Memorial Airport		
Wichita	BEC	BEC	KBEC	Beech Factory Airport		
Wichita	CEA	CEA	KCEA	Cessna Aircraft Field		
Wichita	71K			Westport Airport		
Wichita	72K			Westport Auxiliary Airport		
				**Other military airports**		
Fort Leavenworth	FLV	FLV	KFLV	Sherman Army Airfield		
Junction City	FRI	FRI	KFRI	Marshall Army Airfield (Fort Riley)		
Wichita	IAB	IAB	KIAB	McConnell Air Force Base		77
				**Notable private-use airports**		
Andover	13KS			Daniel's Landing Airport		
St. Marys	84KS			St. Mary's Airpark (formerly public use, FAA: 8K4)		
				**Notable former airports**		
Anthony	~~7K6~~			Wilcox Field		
Derby	~~1K3~~			Hamilton Field (closed 2008?)		
Dodge City	~~9K1~~			Wilroads Gardens Airport (Wilroads Garden Airport) (closed 2008?)		
Greensburg	~~8K7~~			Paul Windle Municipal Airport (Wendle Municipal Airport) (closed 2008?)		
Kansas City	~~KCK~~		~~KKCK~~	Fairfax Airport (closed 1985)		
Plainville	~~0R9~~			Plainville Airpark (closed 2010?)		
Pleasanton	~~57K~~			Gilmore Airport		
Stockton	~~0S2~~			Stockton Municipal Airport (closed 2012?)		
Wichita / Maize	~~70K~~			Maize Airport (closed 2008?)		
Wichita	~~K32~~			Riverside Airport (closed 2014?)		
Yates Center	~~8K5~~			Yates Center Airport		

== See also ==
- Essential Air Service
- Kansas World War II Army Airfields
- Wikipedia:WikiProject Aviation/Airline destination lists: North America#Kansas

== Sources ==
Federal Aviation Administration (FAA):

- FAA Airport Data (Form 5010) from National Flight Data Center (NFDC), also available from AirportIQ 5010
- National Plan of Integrated Airport Systems (2017–2021), released September 2016
- Passenger Boarding (Enplanement) Data for CY 2019 and 2020, updated November 8, 2021
- Passenger Boarding (Enplanement) Data for CY 2023 and 2024, updated September 2025

Kansas Department of Transportation (KDOT):

- Division of Aviation
- "Airport Directory" (PDF).

Other sites used as a reference when compiling and updating this list:

- Aviation Safety Network – used to check IATA airport codes
- Great Circle Mapper: Airports in Kansas – used to check IATA and ICAO airport codes
- Abandoned & Little-Known Airfields: Kansas – used for information on former airports
- Largest Airports in Kansas - used for updated flight counts and airlines
