= Riverside Airport (Kansas) =

Former privately owned, public use airport in Sedgwick County, Kansas, United States

- IATA: none; ICAO: none; FAA LID: K32

Summary
- Airport type: Public use (abandoned)
- Owner: Cornejo & Sons; Fly High, Inc.
- Serves: Wichita, Kansas
- Elevation AMSL: 1,335 ft / 407 m
- Coordinates: 37°44′46″N 097°24′22″W

Map
- Location of airport in Kansas

Runways
Direction	Length		Surface
Direction	ft	m	Surface
16/34	3,200	975	Asphalt

Statistics (2012)
- Aircraft operations: 14,000
- Based aircraft: 29
- Source: Federal Aviation Administration, Paul Freeman

Riverside Airport (FAA LID: K32) was a privately owned, public use airport in Sedgwick County, Kansas, United States. It was located on the east side of the intersection of Hoover Rd. and 33rd Street North in northwest Wichita.

In late February 2014, the property was sold to Cornejo & Sons Construction, which closed the facility and plans to mine the sand underneath it.

== Facilities and aircraft ==
Riverside Airport covered an area of 220 acres (89 ha) at an elevation of 1,335 feet (407 m) above mean sea level. It had one runway designated 16/34 with an asphalt surface measuring 3,200 by 40 feet (975 x 12 m).

For the 12-month period ending June 8, 2012, the airport had 14,000 general aviation aircraft operations, an average of 38 per day. At that time there were 29 aircraft based at this airport: 25 single-engine, 3 multi-engine, and 1 ultralight.

== Nearby airports ==
Other airports in Wichita

- Wichita Dwight D. Eisenhower National Airport
- Colonel James Jabara Airport
- Beech Factory Airport
- Cessna Aircraft Field
- McConnell Air Force Base
- Westport Airport

Other airports in metro

- Augusta Municipal Airport
- Lloyd Stearman Field (Benton)

Other airports in region

- List of airports in Kansas
- List of airports in Oklahoma
