= Lloyd Stearman Field =

Airport in Benton, Kansas

Benton Airpark Lloyd Stearman Field
- IATA: none; ICAO: none; FAA LID: 1K1

Summary
- Airport type: Public
- Operator: Benton Airpark, Inc.
- Location: Benton, Kansas
- Elevation AMSL: 1,364 ft / 415.7 m
- Coordinates: 37°46′40″N 97°06′49″W
- Interactive map of Benton Airpark; Lloyd Stearman Field

Runways
Direction	Length		Surface
Direction	ft	m	Surface
17/35	5,100	1,554	Asphalt

Lloyd Stearman Field (FAA LID: 1K1), also known as Benton Airpark, is a public airport located one mile (1.6 km) southwest of the central business district of Benton, in Butler County, Kansas, United States. The airport covers 30 acres and has one runway. It was named in honor of aviation pioneer Lloyd Stearman and seven Stearman World War II-era training biplanes are based there.

The airfield was used for several scenes from the 1969 movie The Gypsy Moths.

== Services ==
In early 2010, a restaurant, Stearman Field Bar & Grill, opened on the airport property. It serves typical cafe food, such as breakfast, hamburgers, and steaks, as well as a full bar.

Fueling options include Jet-A with Prist via fuel truck, and a self-serve 100LL pump is located in the main parking apron. Ground Power Units are available.

King Air 90B charter services are available. Beechjet shares are also offered.

Flight training is available at Prairie Air Service, located midfield. Tie-downs and hangars are also available, but are not plentiful. A crew car is available.

== Nearby airports ==
Other airports in Wichita

- Wichita Mid-Continent Airport
- Colonel James Jabara Airport
- Beech Factory Airport
- Cessna Aircraft Field
- McConnell Air Force Base
- Westport Airport

Other nearby airports

- El Dorado / Captain Jack Thomas Airport
- Augusta Municipal Airport

Other airports in region

- List of airports in Kansas
- List of airports in Oklahoma
