= Plainville Airpark =

- IATA: none; ICAO: none; FAA LID: 0R9

Summary
- Airport type: Public
- Owner: City of Plainville
- Serves: Plainville, Kansas
- Elevation AMSL: 2,182 ft / 665 m
- Coordinates: 39°11′39″N 099°18′11″W

Map
- Location of airport in Kansas

Runways
Direction	Length		Surface
Direction	ft	m	Surface
17/35	2,600	792	Turf

Statistics (2010)
- Aircraft operations: 3,200
- Sources: FAA, Kansas DOT

Plainville Airpark (FAA LID: 0R9) was a city-owned, public-use airport located three nautical miles (6 km) south of the central business district of Plainville, a city in Rooks County, Kansas, United States.

== Facilities and aircraft ==
Plainville Airpark covered an area of 15 acres (6 ha) at an elevation of 2,182 feet (665 m) above mean sea level. It had one runway designated 17/35 with a turf surface measuring 2,600 by 120 feet (792 x 37 m). For the 12-month period ending May 27, 2010, the airport had 3,200 aircraft operations, an average of 61 per week: 94% general aviation and 6% air taxi.

== See also ==
- Rooks County Regional Airport, located 7 miles (11 km) north of Plainville
