= Norwich Airport (disambiguation) =

Norwich Airport may refer to:

- Norwich Airport in Norwich, Norfolk, England
- Norwich Lt. Warren Eaton Airport in Norwich, New York, United States
- Norwich Airport (Kansas) in Norwich, Kansas, United States
