= K34 =

K34 or K-34 may refer to:

- K-34 (Kansas highway)
- Gardner Municipal Airport (Kansas)
- HMAS Ararat (K34), a corvette of the Royal Australian Navy
- HMS Gladiolus (K34), a corvette of the Royal Navy
- HSwMS Nyköping (K34), a corvette of the Swedish Navy
- Keratin 34
- Makubetsu Station, in Hokkaido, Japan
- Potassium-34, an isotope of potassium
