= K68 =

K68 may refer to:

- a MTR bus line connecting Yuen Long Industrial Estate and Yuen Long Town Park in Hong Kong
- another designation for the star Holmberg IX
- Garnett Municipal Airport FAA LID
- one of the indexes of the great dodecicosahedron, a uniform polyhedron

K-68 may refer to:

- K-68 (Kansas highway), a road in the US State of Kansas
- K-68 trailer, a 7-ton, 2 axle U.S. Signal Corps vehicle associated with SCR-268 radar station
