= JHN =

JHN may refer to:

- Johnstone railway station, in Renfrewshire, Scotland
- Stanton County Municipal Airport, in Kansas
- John Hunter Nemechek, NASCAR driver

== See also ==
- Gospel of John
