= K32 =

K32 or K-32 may refer to:

- K-32 (Kansas highway)
- Gallimathias musicum, a quodlibet by Wolfgang Amadeus Mozart
- HMS Coreopsis (K32), a corvette of the Royal Navy
- HSwMS Helsingborg (K32), a corvette of the Swedish Navy
- INS Misnak (K-32), a frigate of the Israeli Navy
- Kandi K32, a Chinese pickup truck
- Riverside Airport (Kansas), closed
