= St. Mary's Airport =

St. Mary's Airport may refer to:

- St. Mary's Airport (Alaska) in St. Mary's, Alaska, United States (FAA/IATA: KSM)
- St Mary's Airport, Isles of Scilly in St Mary's, Isles of Scilly, United Kingdom (IATA: ISC)
- St. Mary's Airpark in St. Mary's, Kansas, United States (FAA: 8K4)
- St. Mary's County Regional Airport in Leonardtown, Maryland, United States (FAA: 2W6)

St. Marys Airport may refer to:

- St. Marys Airport in St. Marys, Georgia, United States (FAA: 4J6)
- St. Marys Municipal Airport in St. Marys, Pennsylvania, United States (FAA: OYM)
