= KSYF =

KSYF may refer to:

- KSYF (FM), a radio station (107.5 FM) licensed to serve Olathe, Colorado, United States
- Cheyenne County Municipal Airport (ICAO code KSYF)
