= Cessna Aircraft Field =

Airport in Wichita, Kansas

- IATA: CEA; ICAO: KCEA; FAA LID: CEA

Summary
- Airport type: Public
- Owner: Cessna Aircraft Company
- Serves: Wichita, Kansas
- Elevation AMSL: 1,378 ft (420 m)
- Coordinates: 37°38′55″N 097°15′02″W
- Interactive map of Cessna Aircraft Field

Runways
Direction	Length		Surface
Direction	ft	m	Surface
17/35	3,873	1,180	Asphalt

Statistics (2019)
- Aircraft operations (year ending July 19, 2019): 100
- Based aircraft: 16
- Source: Federal Aviation Administration

Cessna Aircraft Field (IATA: CEA, ICAO: KCEA, FAA LID: CEA) is a public use airport located four nautical miles (7 km) southeast of the central business district of Wichita, in Sedgwick County, Kansas, United States. It is privately owned by the Cessna Aircraft Company.

== Facilities and aircraft ==
Cessna Aircraft Field covers an area of 900 acres (360 ha) at an elevation of 1,378 feet (420 m) above mean sea level. It has one runway designated 17/35 with an asphalt measuring 3,873 by 40 feet (1,180 x 12 m).

For the 12-month period ending July 19, 2019, the airport had 100 general aviation aircraft operations, an average of 8 per month. At that time there were 16 aircraft based at this airport: 15 single-engine and 1 multi-engine.

== Nearby airports ==
Other airports in Wichita

- Wichita Dwight D. Eisenhower National Airport
- Colonel James Jabara Airport
- Beech Factory Airport
- McConnell Air Force Base
- Westport Airport

Other airports in metro

- El Dorado/Captain Jack Thomas Memorial Airport
- Augusta Municipal Airport
- Lloyd Stearman Field (Benton)

Other airports in region

- List of airports in Kansas
- List of airports in Oklahoma
