= Westport Airport (Kansas) =

- IATA: none; ICAO: none; FAA LID: 71K

Summary
- Airport type: Public use
- Owner: Earl V. Long III
- Serves: Wichita, Kansas
- Elevation AMSL: 1,290 ft / 393 m
- Coordinates: 37°38.86′N 097°23.02′W

Map
- Location of airport in Kansas

Runways
Direction	Length		Surface
Direction	ft	m	Surface
17/35	2,520	768	Asphalt

Statistics (2016)
- Aircraft operations: 860
- Based aircraft: 14
- Sources: Federal Aviation Administration

Westport Airport (FAA LID: 71K) is a privately owned, public use airport located three nautical miles (6 km) southwest of the central business district of Wichita, a city in Sedgwick County, Kansas, United States. It is in the Class C airspace of neighboring Wichita Dwight D. Eisenhower National Airport.

Westport, popularly known as Dead Cow International, hosts, fuels and maintains light aircraft, services and sells parts for Cessna cropdusters, and is a center for restoration and operation of vintage aircraft.

== Facilities and aircraft ==
Westport Airport covers an area of 32 acres (13 ha) at an elevation of 1,290 feet (393 m) above mean sea level. It has one runway designated 17/35 with an asphalt surface measuring 2,520 by 30 feet (768 x 9 m).

- Southbound, the runway (Runway 17) has a 400-foot displaced threshold, owing to a powerline, thoroughfare and buildings immediately north of the field.
- Northbound, the runway (Runway 35) has a powerline near its end, and requires a right-hand traffic pattern, minimizing interference with Wichita Eisenhower Airport traffic to the west.

The 30-foot wide runway is asphalt (with surface cracks, and with grass encroaching on the sides), and is only officially reported as rated for 3,000-pound gross weight aircraft with single-wheel landing gear. However, larger single-wheel aircraft (e.g. Beech 18, Cessna T-50) have been based there.

There is also an unofficial, wider, parallel adjacent grass runway, along the east side of the paved runway. A paved or gravel taxiway connects the paved runway to a paved ramp and grass ramp areas, and T-hangars.

The airport FBO provides aircraft maintenance (including major airframe and powerplant repairs) and piston aircraft fuel (100LL), and the field is a popular location for the restoration of vintage aircraft, and the annual inspection and maintenance of modern planes.

The airport also services as the headquarters and operating base of the local "Jayhawk Wing" of the Commemorative Air Force (CAF), which has a large hangar there for its restored-and-flying single- and twin-engine World War II training aircraft.

== Airspace and control ==
Westport is in the Class C airspace surrounding nearby Wichita Dwight D. Eisenhower National Airport (formerly Mid-Continent International Airport), the city's municipal airport, 2 miles west of Westport.

Westport has no control tower of its own, but is generally open to public in daylight hours.

According to the FAA Chart Supplement for North Central U.S., dated 26 May 2016, for departures, pilots should contact Wichita tower on ground or on the tower frequency, "and remain east of the field until communications are established."

== Communications and navigation ==
=== Communications ===
The airport UNICOM frequency is 122.9 (in mid-2015) is not always monitored by ground personnel.

Air traffic control frequencies are from Wichita tower, of nearby Wichita Dwight D. Eisenhower National Airport (formerly Mid-Continent International Airport), the city's municipal airport, 2 miles west of Westport.

=== Navigation ===
The Wichita VOR is a few miles northwest of the airport, and a non-directional beacon (NDB) a few miles southwest of the field.

The field has no instrument landing system, and no published IFR approaches. Aviation Safety Magazine has noted that it is possible to approach neighboring Eisenhower Airport on an IFR approach, and then, when below the overcast, cancel IFR flight plan and request a Special VFR (SVFR) clearance to land at 71K (Wesport).

A wind sock is in the center of the field, west of the runways, and a wind tetrahedron has been seen near the north end of the runway, though its status is unknown. Prevailing winds are from the south, and Runway 35 is the most commonly used approach.

== History and status ==
Westport Airport was founded in 1946, by Earl V. ("Van") Long II, and subsequently taken over by his sons. Today, only Earl V. Long III—a noted local aircraft mechanic with degrees in math and physics, and much experience restoring vintage military aircraft—operates the field.

In its early years, Westport doubled as a cow pasture. When a plane landing in the dark struck and killed a cow—and another was found dead later—the airport got its nickname, Dead Cow International" ("DCI"), a nickname celebrated by the owners and enshrined in their logo.

In 1983, the Longs founded Westport AG Sales & Service, focusing largely on agricultural aircraft—particularly Cessna 188 Agwagon maintenance and parts supply. That FBO now operates the airport.

In later years, in addition to hosting typical light aircraft, and servicing them, Westport became a mecca for vintage aircraft restoration, particularly of Beech Model 18 and Cessna Bobcat aircraft, and a local chapter (the Jayhawk Wing) of the Commemorative Air Force was established there, equipped with some of the planes restored locally. It also serves as a cropduster (Cessna 188/ Cessna AgWagon) maintenance and parts facility.

For the 12-month period ending June 22, 2012, the airport had 860 general aviation aircraft operations, an average of 71 per month. At that time there were 14 aircraft based at this airport: 86% single-engine and 14% multi-engine.

== Nearby airports ==
NOTE: Westport is under the Class C controlled airspace for Wichita's nearby municipal airport.

- Wichita Dwight D. Eisenhower National Airport (formerly Mid-Continent International Airport), which has extensive jet aircraft traffic (particularly business jets, which are built locally), and limited amounts of heavy aircraft traffic, as well as substantial traffic of general aviation airplanes and helicopters.

Other airports in Wichita:

- Wichita Dwight D. Eisenhower National Airport, about 2 miles west of Westport Airport — the city's principal municipal airport, with heavy-jet traffic and Class C controlled airspace
- Westport Auxiliary Airport, about 2 miles south of Westport Airport — a small, unattended, rough grass field
- Colonel James Jabara Airport — Wichita's principal public general aviation airport, on the opposite side of town, accommodating small aircraft and business jets
- Beech Factory Airport, private field, on the far east side of town, with control tower
- Cessna Aircraft Field, private field, on the far east side of town, southeast of downtown, immediately north of McConnell AFB (see below)
- McConnell Air Force Base on the far east side of town, southeast of downtown, adjacent to Cessna Field, a restricted field with controlled airspace

Other airports in metropolitan area:

- El Dorado / Captain Jack Thomas Airport
- Augusta Municipal Airport (east of city)
- Lloyd Stearman Field (Benton) (northeast of city)
- Cook Field (southeast of city)

Other airports in region:

- List of airports in Kansas
- List of airports in Oklahoma
