= Riverside Airport =

Riverside Airport may refer to:

- Riverside Airport (Kansas), a former public use airport in Wichita, Kansas, United States (FAA LID: K32)
- Riverside Municipal Airport, a public use airport in Riverside, California, United States (FAA/IATA: RAL)
- Richard Lloyd Jones Jr. Airport, a public use airport with tower call sign "Riverside", in Tulsa, Oklahoma, United States (FAA/IATA: RVS)
- Meyer Riverside Airpark, a private use airport in Tigard, Oregon, United States (FAA: OG34)

== See also ==
- March Air Reserve Base, a United States Air Reserve base in Riverside County, California (FAA/IATA: RIV)
