= KUKL =

KUKL may refer to:

- Kukl (band), an Icelandic gothic rock group in the 1980s, most notable for being one of Björk's first bands
- KUKL (FM), a radio station (89.9 FM) licensed to serve Kalispell, Montana, United States, a satellite of KUFM-FM
- KUKL-TV, a television station (channel 15, virtual 46) licensed to serve Kalispell, Montana
- Coffey County Airport (ICAO code KUKL)
