= HLC =

HLC may refer to:

- Harrogate Ladies' College
- Hill City Municipal Airport, IATA code
- High Line Canal
- Higher Learning Commission
- Higher lending charge, a charge made by mortgage lenders.
- Historic landscape characterisation
- HKFYG Lee Shau Kee College, a middle school in Tin Shui Wai, Hong Kong.
- Ho Lap College, a middle school in San Po Kong, Hong Kong.
- Homeland Learning Centre
- Homer Laughlin China, the manufacturer of the popular Fiestaware product line.
- Hybrid Layer Capacitor
