= K78 =

K78 or K-78 may refer to:

- K-78 (Kansas highway), a state highway in Kansas
- Abilene Municipal Airport
