= Augusta Airport =

Augusta Airport may refer to:

- Augusta Municipal Airport in Augusta, Kansas, United States (FAA: 3AU)
- Augusta Regional Airport at Bush Field, in Augusta, Georgia, United States (FAA/IATA: AGS)
- Augusta State Airport in Augusta, Maine, United States (FAA/IATA: AUG)
- Augusta Airport in Augusta, Western Australia, Australia (ICAO: YAUG)
- Daniel Field, the original municipal airport of Augusta, Georgia
