= Gardner Airport =

Gardner Airport may refer to:

Public use airports:

- Gardner Municipal Airport (Kansas) in Gardner, Kansas, United States (FAA: K34)
- Gardner Municipal Airport (Massachusetts) in Gardner, Massachusetts, United States (FAA: GDM)

Private use airports

- Gardner Airport (Florida), in Gardner, Florida, United States (FAA: FD40)
- Gardner Airport (Pennsylvania), in Breinigsville, Pennsylvania, United States (FAA: 29PA)

Former airports

- Gardner Army Airfield, a former U.S. Army Airfield in Taft, California, United States

Similarly named airports

- Gardiner Airport
