= Hamilton Field =

Hamilton Field may refer to:

- Hamilton Easter Field (1873–1922), American artist, critic, collector and patron
- Hamilton Army Airfield (also Hamilton Air Force Base), a former U.S. Air Force and U.S. Army Base located on San Francisco Bay, California, U.S.
- Hamilton Field (Kansas), an airport located in Derby, Kansas, U.S.
- Hamilton Field (Fort Wayne), a former baseball field in Fort Wayne, Indiana, U.S.
- Hamilton Field, the original name of sports venue Barron Stadium in Rome, Georgia, U.S.
