= Abilene Airport =

Abilene Airport may refer to:

- Abilene Municipal Airport in Abilene, Kansas, US (FAA: K78)
- Abilene Regional Airport in Abilene, Texas, US (FAA: ABI)
