= Beech Factory Airport =

Airport in Wichita, Kansas

- IATA: BEC; ICAO: KBEC; FAA LID: BEC

Summary
- Airport type: Public
- Owner: Beechcraft
- Serves: Wichita, Kansas
- Elevation AMSL: 1,408 ft (429 m)
- Coordinates: 37°41′40″N 097°12′54″W
- Interactive map of Beech Factory Airport

Runways
Direction	Length		Surface
Direction	ft	m	Surface
1/19	8,000	2,438	Concrete

Statistics (2008)
- Aircraft operations: 32,700
- Based aircraft: 77
- Source: Federal Aviation Administration

Beech Factory Airport (IATA: BEC, ICAO: KBEC, FAA LID: BEC) is a public use airport located five nautical miles (9 km) east of the central business district of Wichita, a city in Sedgwick County, Kansas, United States. It is privately owned by Beechcraft.

== Facilities and aircraft ==
Beech Factory Airport covers an area of 1,280 acres (520 ha) at an elevation of 1,408 feet (429 m) above mean sea level. It has one runway designated 1/19 with a concrete surface measuring 8,000 by 100 feet (2,438 x 30 m).

For the 12-month period ending May 13, 2008, the airport had 32,700 aircraft operations, an average of 89 per day: 86% general aviation and 14% military. At that time there were 77 aircraft based at this airport: 27% single-engine, 38% multi-engine, 13% jet and 22% military. Following the merger of the Cessna and Beechcraft employee flying clubs, Cessna's flying club has since moved from their previous base at Wichita Mid-Continental Airport to Beech Factory Airport.

== History ==
The airport was founded in 1928 as part of a 148-acre land tract purchased from the city to house the Knoll Aircraft Company. The Yellow Air Cab Company purchased the assets in 1930, followed by Beechcraft in 1940.

== Nearby airports ==
Other airports in Wichita

- Wichita Dwight D. Eisenhower National Airport
- Colonel James Jabara Airport
- Cessna Aircraft Field
- McConnell Air Force Base
- Westport Airport

Other airports in metro

- El Dorado / Captain Jack Thomas Airport
- Augusta Municipal Airport
- Lloyd Stearman Field (Benton)

Other airports in region

- List of airports in Kansas
- List of airports in Oklahoma

== Incidents ==
On November 20, 2013 at approximately 9:30 pm CST, a Boeing 747-400 Dreamlifter with registration N780BA and operated by Atlas Air was en route to McConnell Air Force Base when it landed at the wrong airport. The pilots initially erroneously thought that they were at Beech Factory Airport. After reviewing coordinates with ATC and communicating with local ground control, it was determined that they were in fact at Colonel James Jabara Airport. The plane successfully took off at 1:15 pm CST on November 21 and landed at nearby McConnell AFB. The NTSB opened an investigation about the mistaken landing.
