= UKL =

UKL may refer to:

- BMW UKL platform, an automobile platform used in BMW and Mini vehicles
- Coffey County Airport, a public-use airport in Kansas
- Ukraine Air Alliance, a Ukrainian airline
- Ursula K. Le Guin (1929–2018), an American novelist
- UK Loggers, competitive woodchopping organisation
