= Washington County Memorial Airport =

- IATA: none; ICAO: none; FAA LID: K38

Summary
- Airport type: Public
- Owner: Washington County
- Serves: Washington, Kansas
- Elevation AMSL: 1,436 ft / 438 m
- Coordinates: 39°44′07″N 097°02′51″W

Map
- Location of airport in Kansas

Runways
| Direction | Length | | Surface |
| Direction | ft | m | Surface |
|---|---|---|---|
| 17/35 | 3,406 | 1,038 | Concrete |

Statistics (2010)
- Aircraft operations: 1,700
- Based aircraft: 3
- Source: Federal Aviation Administration

Washington County Memorial Airport (FAA LID: K38) is a county-owned, public-use airport in Washington County, Kansas, United States. It is located five nautical miles (6 mi, 9 km) south of the central business district of Washington, Kansas.

== Facilities and aircraft ==
Washington County Memorial Airport covers an area of 23 acres (9 ha) at an elevation of 1,436 feet (438 m) above mean sea level. It has one runway designated 17/35 with a concrete surface measuring 3,406 by 60 feet (1,038 x 18 m).

For the 12-month period ending November 16, 2010, the airport had 1,700 general aviation aircraft operations, an average of 141 per month. At that time there were 3 aircraft based at this airport, all single-engine.

== See also ==
- List of airports in Kansas
