= Osage City Municipal Airport =

Airport in Kansas, United States

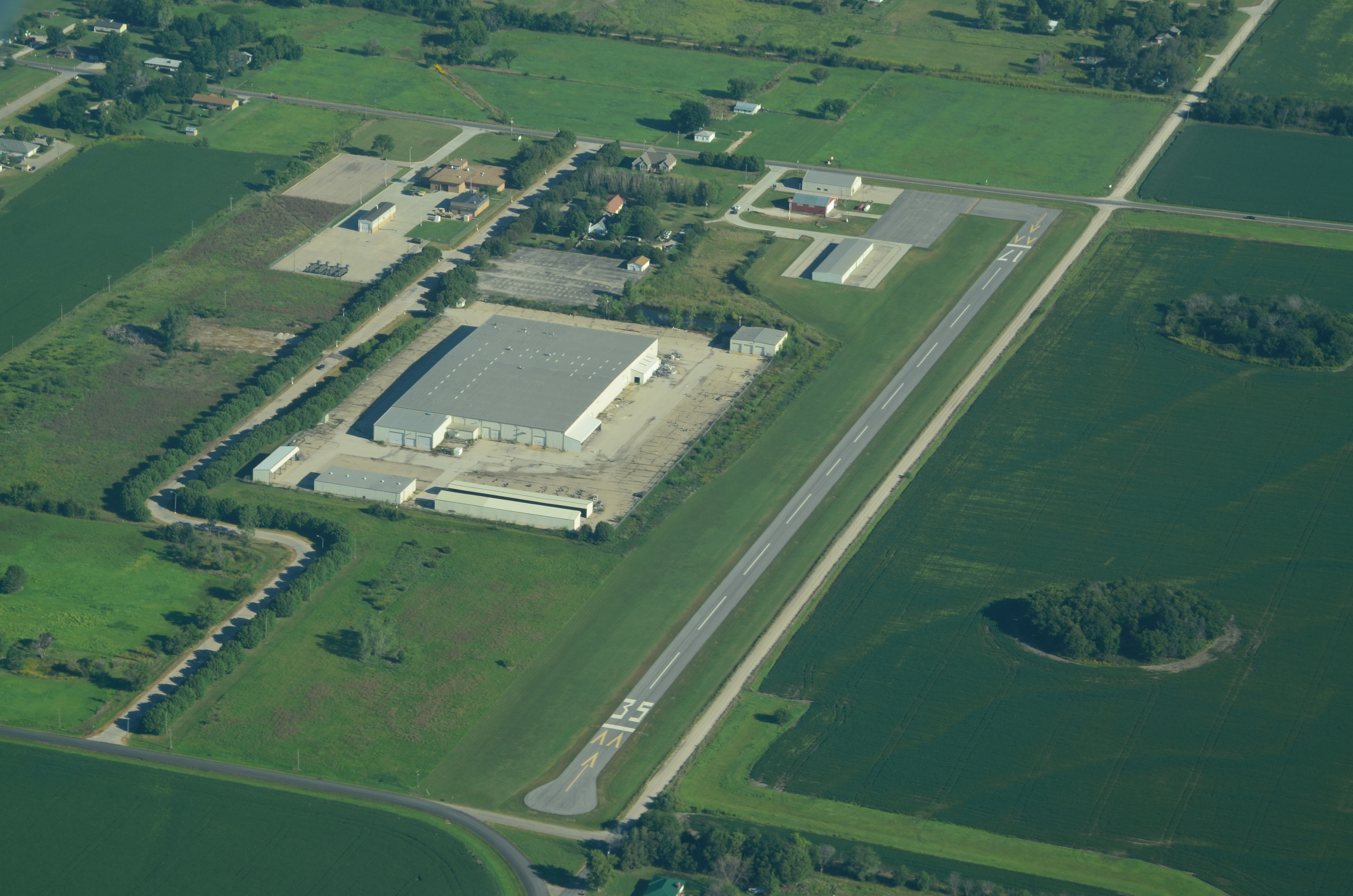
- IATA: none; ICAO: none; FAA LID: 53K

Summary
- Airport type: Public
- Owner: City of Osage
- Serves: Osage City, Kansas
- Elevation AMSL: 1,106 ft (337 m)
- Coordinates: 38°38′00″N 095°48′06″W
- Interactive map of Osage City Municipal Airport

Runways
Direction	Length		Surface
Direction	ft	m	Surface
17/35	2,539	780	Asphalt

Statistics (2021)
- Aircraft operations (year ending 8/31/2021): 2,700
- Based aircraft: 13
- Source: Federal Aviation Administration

Osage City Municipal Airport (FAA LID: 53K) is a city-owned public-use airport located one nautical mile (1.6 km) east of the central business district of Osage City, a city in Osage County, Kansas, United States.

== Facilities and aircraft ==
Osage City Municipal Airport covers an area of 20 acres (8.1 ha) at an elevation of 1106 feet (337 m) above mean sea level. It has one runway: 17/35 is 2,560 by 40 feet (780 x 12 m) with an asphalt surface.

For the 12-month period ending August 31, 2021, the airport had 2,700 aircraft operations, an average of 52 per week: 100% general aviation. At that time there were 13 aircraft based at this airport: 10 single-engine and 3 helicopter.

== See also ==
- List of airports in Kansas
