= Carl Weeks =

American businessman

- Born: December 2, 1876; Linn County, Iowa, U.S.
- Died: June 3, 1962 (aged 85); Des Moines, Iowa, U.S.
- Occupations: Founder of The Armand Company and Weeks & Leo Co.
- Spouse: Edith Van Slyke (m. 1907; died 1955)
- Children: Charles Vanslyke Weeks (1908–1991); William Chamberlain Weeks (1910–1994); Evert Deyet 'Hud' Weeks (1912–2002); Lafayette Weeks (1918–1986)

Carl Weeks (1876–1962) was an American businessman, entrepreneur and philanthropist best known for founding pharmaceutical and cosmetic companies, including Weeks & Leo Co., Inc. Carl and his wife Edith built Salisbury House in Des Moines, Iowa.

== Early life ==
Carl Weeks was born to Charles Weeks and Laura (Chamberlain) Weeks on December 2, 1876, in Linn County, Iowa. In 1879, the family including 2-year-old Carl relocated to Kansas. Charles and Laura built and managed the Sod Hotel, an elegant hotel made of prairie sod in Plainville, Kansas.

In 1888, when Carl was 11 years old, the Weeks family moved back to Iowa and settled in Des Moines. Carl completed high school at the age of 16 and subsequently attended Highland Park College of Pharmacy in Des Moines, where he earned a degree in Pharmacy.

== Business ==
After completing school, Carl moved to Oskaloosa, Iowa, working for Green & Bentley Drug Company. Carl then purchased a drug store in Centerville, Iowa. Carl sold the drug store and returned to Des Moines to work at the D. Weeks Company.

=== D. Weeks Company ===
D. Weeks Company was owned by Carl's brothers, Deyet and Leo Weeks. The company manufactured patent medicines from formulas that Carl provided. Carl eventually served as President of the company.

=== D. C. Leo Company ===
Carl and Leo Weeks formed D. C. Leo Company after their brother, Deyet Weeks, died. D. C. Leo Company offered private label medicines and cosmetics to individual dealers.

=== The Armand Company ===
In 1907, Carl formed The Florian Company to manufacture cosmetics. The Florian Company, based in Des Moines, was renamed The Armand Company in 1915. The company made cosmetic lines Armand and Pearls in Wine. Carl revolutionized the face powder market by combining cold cream into face powder. The product was marketed as “ARMAND’S COMPLEXION POWDER IN THE LITTLE PINK & WHITE HAT BOX” and “ARMAND COLD CREAM POWDER In The LITTLE PINK & WHITE HAT BOXES”.

By 1927, The Armand Company was number one in the United States in face powder sales. The company had also expanded into numerous international markets.

Carl merged Armand Company into Weeks & Leo Co., Inc. when he retired in 1950.

=== Weeks & Leo Co., Inc. ===
Weeks & Leo Co., Inc. was formed in 1935 through the merger of D. Weeks Company and D. C. Leo Company. The companies were merged to focus on the private label cosmetics and toiletries business. The Armand Company was merged into Weeks & Leo Co. in 1950.

== Philanthropy ==
Carl Weeks served as a trustee for Drake University located in Des Moines. He was in charge of fundraising for the construction of Drake Stadium at Drake University. Drake Stadium opened in 1925.

Carl was instrumental in the formation of Drake University College of Pharmacy. For a decade, Carl had helped fund Des Moines College of Pharmacy which had roots in his alma mater, Highland Park College of Pharmacy. In 1939, with Carl's assistance Des Moines College of Pharmacy was merged into Drake University creating the new college of pharmacy.

He was also an officer of the Greater Des Moines Committee, Des Moines Rotary Club, and was on the board of trustees of Edmundson Art Foundation. Carl was a founder of Des Moines Art Center, Civic Music Association and Des Moines Community Playhouse.

== Salisbury House ==
Carl and Edith Weeks built Salisbury House in Des Moines as their personal residence. The house was furnished with antiques and collectibles purchased from around the world. Salisbury House is now a museum.
