= Salisbury House (Des Moines, Iowa) =

Historic house in Iowa, United States

- U.S. National Register of Historic Places
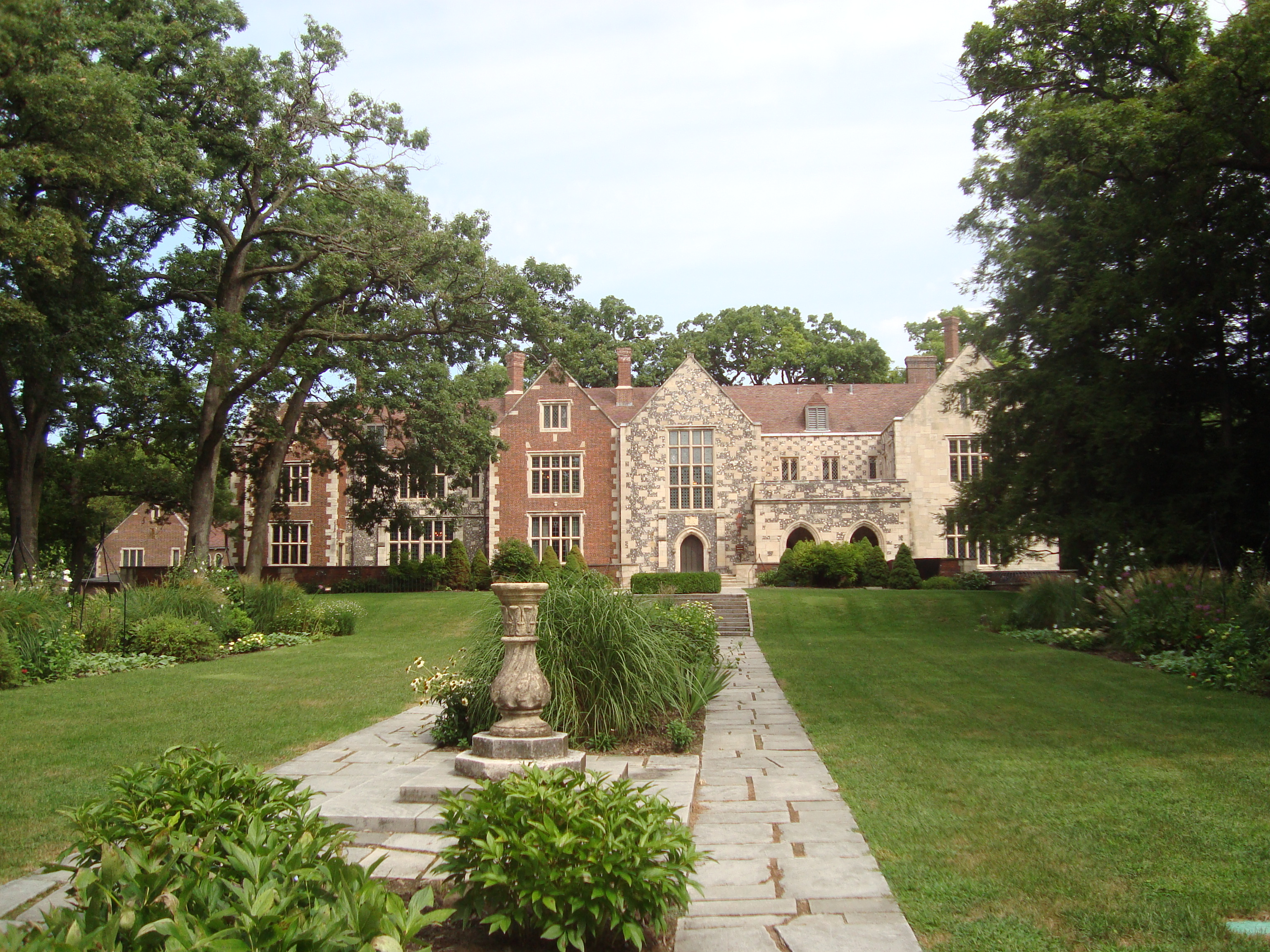

- Location within Iowa Location within the United States
- Interactive map showing the location of Salisbury House
- Location: 4025 Tonawanda Dr. Des Moines, Iowa
- Coordinates: 41°34′46″N 93°40′17″W
- Area: 9.4 acres (3.8 ha)
- Built: 1923
- Architect: Byron Bennett Boyd; William Whitney Rasmussen
- Architectural style: Tudor Revival, Jacobethan Revival
- NRHP reference No.: 77000551
- Added to NRHP: July 20, 1977

Salisbury House, in Des Moines, Iowa, is a Tudor, Gothic and Carolean style manor home built on a wooded hill with commanding views. It was built by cosmetics magnate Carl Weeks and his wife, Edith Van Slyke Weeks, between 1923 and 1928. Salisbury House was modeled after the King's House in Salisbury, England, contains 42 rooms and measures just over 22,000 square feet (2,000 m^{2}). The property is owned and operated by the Salisbury House Foundation and is open to the public for tours, public events, and private rentals.

Salisbury House was added to the National Register of Historic Places in 1977. The listing covered a 9.4-acre (3.8 ha) area with two contributing buildings, one other contributing structure and one contributing site. Salisbury House is also on the List of Registered Historic Places in Iowa.

== Timeline ==
- 1923 to 1928: Constructed and furnished with an original budget of $150,000, the final cost was $3 million.
- 1926: Carl and Edith Weeks and their four sons—Charles, William, Evert, and Lafayette—move into Salisbury House.
- 1934: Carl and Edith Weeks donate Salisbury House to Drake University; they retain ownership of the House's collections and furnishings, and pay rent to Drake as tenants until 1954.
- 1954: Iowa State Education Association (ISEA) purchased Salisbury House and its collections from Drake University and the Weeks Family for $180,000 and began using it as office space.
- 1993: Salisbury House Foundation was formed to preserve, interpret and share the property for the cultural and educational benefit of the public.
- 1998: Salisbury House Foundation purchased the property and collections from ISEA for $4.0 million.
- 1999: Operation of Salisbury House as a historic house museum began.

== Collections ==
The Weeks Family amassed extensive collections of fine art, decorative art, rare books, musical instruments, historic documents, weapons and sculpture, and most of their holdings remain in Salisbury House to this day. However, in the summer of 2019, Grinnell College purchased the library of Carl and Edith Weeks and moved the collection of approximately 3,000 volumes and 2,500 historic documents to Burling Library on the Grinnell College campus. The collection remains open for research by the public, and Grinnell continues to collaborate with Salisbury House on programming involving the collection.

The Salisbury House Foundation offers various tour packages that allow visitors to experience many highlights from the Weeks Family's collections.
