= Mankato Airport =

Airport in Kansas, United States

- IATA: none; ICAO: KTKO; FAA LID: TKO

Summary
- Airport type: Public
- Owner: City of Mankato
- Serves: Mankato, Kansas
- Elevation AMSL: 1,859 ft / 567 m
- Coordinates: 39°48′17″N 098°13′14″W
- Interactive map of Mankato Airport

Runways
Direction	Length		Surface
Direction	ft	m	Surface
17/35	3,540	1,079	Asphalt
9/27	2,505	764	Turf

Statistics (2009)
- Aircraft operations: 5,400
- Source: Federal Aviation Administration

Mankato Airport (ICAO: KTKO, FAA LID: TKO) is a city-owned public-use airport located one nautical mile (1.85 km) northwest of the central business district of Mankato, a city in Jewell County, Kansas, United States.

Although most U.S. airports use the same three-letter location identifier for the FAA and IATA, this airport is assigned TKO by the FAA but has no designation from the IATA.

== Facilities and aircraft ==
Mankato Airport covers an area of 203 acres (82 ha) at an elevation of 1,859 feet (567 m) above mean sea level. It has two runways: 17/35 is 3,540 by 50 feet (1,079 x 15 m) with an asphalt pavement and 9/27 is 2,505 by 100 feet (764 x 30 m) with a turf surface. For the 12-month period ending February 20, 2009, the airport had 5,400 general aviation aircraft operations, an average of 14 per day.

== See also ==
- List of airports in Kansas
