= Anthony Municipal Airport =

- IATA: ANY; ICAO: KANY; FAA LID: ANY

Summary
- Airport type: Public
- Owner: City of Anthony
- Serves: Anthony, Kansas
- Elevation AMSL: 1,343 ft (409 m)
- Coordinates: 37°09′31″N 098°04′47″W
- Interactive map of Anthony Municipal Airport

Runways
| Direction | Length | | Surface |
| Direction | ft | m | Surface |
|---|---|---|---|
| 18/36 | 5,002 | 1,525 | Asphalt |
| 10/28 | 2,212 | 674 | Turf |

Statistics (2018)
- Aircraft operations (year ending 7/31/2018): 6,200
- Based aircraft: 12
- Source: Federal Aviation Administration

Anthony Municipal Airport (IATA: ANY, ICAO: KANY, FAA LID: ANY) is a city-owned public-use airport located three miles (5 km) northwest of the central business district of Anthony, a city in Harper County, Kansas, United States.

== History ==
This airport was originally built in the 1930s by local aviator J. Howard Wilcox. In 1938, the airport installed an airway beacon that remains operational as of 2025. In December 1941, Wilcox was asked to head the Kansas Wing of the newly organized Civil Air Patrol (CAP). The Anthony Airport became the Kansas Wing headquarters of the Civil Air Patrol on December 21, 1941.

In early 1942, Anthony Municipal Airport served as the Civil Air Patrol’s primary training base for Kansas. During World War II, the United States Army Air Forces stationed several Boeing B-17 Flying Fortress bombers there. In the late 1950s, the Civil Air Patrol’s Kansas Wing headquarters relocated from Anthony to Wichita. Around the same time, J. Howard Wilcox left airport management to pursue a legal career.

CAP returned to Anthony in 2008 as a Color Guard in the Anthony Balloon Fest Parade. Although CAP has not yet been re-established in Anthony, CAP has made several appearances in the Harper County Fair Parade in Harper, Kansas, and in the Anthony Christmas Parade. The Civil Air Patrol squadrons that have performed in the parades are Emerald City Composite Squadron out of Wichita, KS and Cunningham Composite Squadron out of Cunningham.

== Facilities and aircraft ==
Anthony Municipal Airport covers an area of 340 acres (140 ha) which contains two runways: 18/36 with a 5,002 x 75 ft (1,525 x 23 m) asphalt pavement and 10/28 with a 2,212 x 150 ft (674 x 46 m) turf surface.

For the 12-month period ending July 31, 2018, the airport had 6,200 general aviation aircraft operations, an average of 119 per week. At that time there were 12 aircraft based at this airport: 10 single-engine and 2 multi-engine.

== See also ==
- List of airports in Kansas
