= Tri-City Airport (Kansas) =

Airport in Kansas, United States of America

- IATA: PPF; ICAO: KPPF; FAA LID: PPF

Summary
- Airport type: Public
- Owner: City of Parsons
- Serves: Parsons, Kansas
- Elevation AMSL: 900 ft / 274 m
- Coordinates: 37°19′51″N 095°30′22″W
- Interactive map of Tri-City Airport

Runways
Direction	Length		Surface
Direction	ft	m	Surface
17/35	5,000	1,524	Concrete

Statistics (2008)
- Aircraft operations: 6,000
- Based aircraft: 15
- Source: Federal Aviation Administration

Tri-City Airport (IATA: PPF, ICAO: KPPF, FAA LID: PPF) is a public-use airport 12 miles west of Parsons, a city in Labette County, Kansas, United States. It serves Coffeyville, Independence, and Parsons, Kansas.

In 1942 it was the Cherryvale Army Air Force Auxiliary Field #9 for the Independence Army Airfield; later it was called Pep Field.

== Historical airline service ==
Airline service to the area started in the early 1930s when National Air Transport stopped at Coffeyville on a route between Chicago and Dallas. In 1951 Ozark Airlines began a route from Kansas City to Tulsa stopping at Topeka, Coffeyville (McGugin Field), and Bartlesville, OK. Ozark's service to Coffeyville ended in 1954 but the airline continued to serve nearby Pittsburg, Kansas. In 1961, Central Airlines Douglas DC-3s began flying to Tri-City Airport (PPF) on a Kansas City - Parsons - Bartlesville - Oklahoma City route. Central Airlines merged into the original Frontier Airlines in 1967, and Frontier Convair 580s landed at Tri-City until 1977. From 1977 until 1989 PPF was served by Air Midwest with 17-seat Swearingen Metroliners to Kansas City, Tulsa, and Wichita. Air Midwest began a codeshare agreement with Eastern Airlines in 1986 and operated as Eastern Express until 1988. Air Midwest then changed their codeshare agreement to Braniff (1983-1990) and operated as Braniff Express. Service ended in April, 1989 and PPF has not seen airline flights since then.

== Facilities ==
Tri-City Airport covers 802 acres (325 ha) at an elevation of 900 feet (274 m). Its single runway, 17/35, is 5,000 by 75 feet (1,524 x 23 m).

In the year ending July 3, 2008 the airport had 6,000 aircraft operations, average 16 per day: 92% general aviation, 5% air taxi and 3% military. 15 aircraft were then based at this airport: 87% single-engine and 13% multi-engine.

== See also ==
- List of airports in Kansas
