= Sublette Municipal Airport =

Airport in Kansas, United States

- IATA: none; ICAO: none; FAA LID: 19S

Summary
- Airport type: Public
- Owner: City of Sublette
- Serves: Sublette, Kansas
- Elevation AMSL: 2,911 ft (887 m)
- Coordinates: 37°29′49″N 100°49′58″W

Map
- Location of airport in Kansas

Runways
Direction	Length		Surface
Direction	ft	m	Surface
17/35	4,498	1,371	Asphalt
8/26	2,300	701	Turf

Statistics (2011)
- Aircraft operations: 600
- Source: Federal Aviation Administration

Sublette Municipal Airport (FAA LID: 19S) is a city-owned, public-use airport located one nautical mile (2 km) northeast of the central business district of Sublette, a city in Haskell County, Kansas, United States. It was formerly known as Sublette Flying Club Airport.

== Facilities and aircraft ==
Sublette Municipal Airport covers an area of 18 acres (7 ha) at an elevation of 2,911 feet (887 m) above mean sea level. It has two runways: 17/35 is 4,498 by 60 feet (1,371 x 18 m) with an asphalt surface and 8/26 is 2,300 by 100 feet (701 x 30 m) with a turf surface. For the 12-month period ending July 19, 2011, the airport had 600 general aviation aircraft operations, an average of 50 per month.

== See also ==
- List of airports in Kansas
