= Colonel James Jabara Airport =

Airport in Wichita, Kansas, United States

- IATA: none; ICAO: KAAO; FAA LID: AAO

Summary
- Airport type: Public
- Owner: Wichita Airport Authority
- Location: Wichita, Kansas
- Elevation AMSL: 1,421 ft (433 m)
- Coordinates: 37°44′51″N 097°13′16″W

Map
- Location of airport in Kansas KAAL/AAO (the United States)

Runways
Direction	Length		Surface
Direction	ft	m	Surface
18/36	6,101	1,860	Concrete

Helipads
Number	Length		Surface
Number	ft	m	Surface
H1	50	15	Concrete

Statistics
- Aircraft operations (2019): 38,300
- Based aircraft (2021): 113
- Source: Federal Aviation Administration

Colonel James Jabara Airport (ICAO: KAAO, FAA LID: AAO) is a public airport located nine miles (14 km) northeast of the central business district of Wichita, a city in Sedgwick County, Kansas, United States. It is named in honor of World War II and Korean War flying ace James Jabara, an American of Lebanese descent who has the distinction of being the first American jet ace.

Although most U.S. airports use the same three-letter location identifier for the FAA and IATA, Colonel James Jabara Airport is assigned AAO by the FAA but has no designation from the IATA (which assigned AAO to Anaco Airport in Anaco, Venezuela).

== Facilities and aircraft ==
Colonel James Jabara Airport covers an area of 600 acres (243 ha) which contains one runway.

- Runway 18/36: 6,101 ft × 100 ft (1,860 m × 30 m), surface: concrete

For 12-month period ending August 13, 2019, the airport had 38,300 aircraft operations, an average of 104 per day: 97% general aviation and 3% air taxi. In November 2021, there were 113 aircraft based at this airport: 60 single-engine, 31 multi-engine, 20 jet aircraft, 1 helicopter and 1 military.

LifeSave Transport, A private medevac company owned by Air Methods, is based out of this airport. They operate a fixed wing and ground operations out of their building.

Colonel James Jabara Airport used to have a dedicated helipad, but it was closed and now has an X painted over the helipad.

== Incidents ==
On November 20, 2013, at approximately 9:30 pm CST, a Boeing 747-400 Dreamlifter (with registration N780BA and operated by Atlas Air) mistakenly landed at the Colonel James Jabara Airport, which was on the same heading as its destination, McConnell Air Force Base. After landing at McConnell, the plane was to taxi over to nearby Spirit AeroSystems, and pick up some fuselage parts for the assembly of Boeing 787 Dreamliners in Everett, Washington. The plane successfully took off at 1:15 pm CST on November 21 and landed at nearby McConnell AFB. The NTSB opened an investigation about the wrong landing. The NTSB published the final report in September 2020 and found the probable causes of this incident to be: "the flight crew's failure to properly identify the airport and runway of intended landing...contributing to the incident was the flight crew's failure to follow company procedures for crosschecking navigational information and visual cues to verify the airport and runway of intended landing."

== Nearby airports ==
Other airports in Wichita

- Wichita Dwight D. Eisenhower National Airport
- Beech Factory Airport
- Cessna Aircraft Field
- McConnell Air Force Base
- Westport Airport

Other airports in metro

- Augusta Municipal Airport
- Lloyd Stearman Field (Benton)

Other airports in region

- List of airports in Kansas
- List of airports in Oklahoma
