= Belleville Municipal Airport =

- IATA: none; ICAO: KRPB; FAA LID: RPB

Summary
- Airport type: Public
- Owner: City of Belleville
- Serves: Belleville, Kansas
- Elevation AMSL: 1,537 ft (468 m)
- Coordinates: 39°49′04″N 097°39′35″W
- Interactive map of Belleville Municipal Airport

Runways
Direction	Length		Surface
Direction	ft	m	Surface
18/36	3,507	1,069	Asphalt
14/32	1,415	431	Turf

Statistics (2007)
- Aircraft operations: 7,650
- Based aircraft: 11
- Source: Federal Aviation Administration

Belleville Municipal Airport (ICAO: KRPB, FAA LID: RPB) is a city-owned airport a mile west of Belleville, in Republic County, Kansas, United States.

Most U.S. airports use the same three-letter location identifier for the FAA and IATA, but Belleville is RPB to the FAA and has no IATA code.

== Facilities ==
The airport covers 111 acres (45 ha) and has two runways: 18/36 is 3,507 x 60 ft (1,069 x 18 m) asphalt and 14/32 is 1,415 x 100 ft (431 x 30 m) turf.

In the year ending July 24, 2007 the airport had 7,650 aircraft operations, average 20 per day: 99% general aviation and 1% military. Eleven aircraft were then based at the airport: nine single-engine and two ultralight.

== See also ==
- List of airports in Kansas
