= Moritz Memorial Airport =

Coordinates: 39°28′16″N 098°07′43″W

- IATA: none; ICAO: none; FAA LID: K61

Summary
- Airport type: Public
- Owner: City of Beloit
- Serves: Beloit, Kansas
- Elevation AMSL: 1,416 ft / 432 m
- Interactive map of Moritz Memorial Airport

Runways
Direction	Length		Surface
Direction	ft	m	Surface
04/22	2,381	726	Turf
08/26	1,658	505	Turf
17/35	3,610	1,100	Concrete

Statistics (2008)
- Aircraft operations: 20,000
- Based aircraft: 13
- Source: Federal Aviation Administration

Moritz Memorial Airport (FAA LID: K61) is a city-owned public-use airport located one mile (2 km) northwest of the central business district of Beloit, a city in Mitchell County, Kansas, United States.

== Facilities and aircraft ==
Moritz Memorial Airport covers an area of 200 acres (81 ha) which contains three runways: 04/22 with a 2,281 x 110 ft (726 x 34 m) turf surface, 08/26 with a 1,658 x 90 ft (505 x 27m) turf surface, and 17/35 with a 3,610 x 60 ft (1100 x 18 m) concrete surface.

For the 12-month period ending May 20, 2008, the airport had 20,000 general aviation aircraft operations, an average of 55 per day. At that time there were 13 aircraft based at this airport: 100% single-engine.

== See also ==
- List of airports in Kansas
