= Clay Center Municipal Airport =

Airport in Kansas, United States

Coordinates: 39°23′14″N 097°09′26″W

- IATA: none; ICAO: KCYW; FAA LID: CYW

Summary
- Airport type: Public
- Owner: City of Clay Center
- Serves: Clay Center, Kansas
- Elevation AMSL: 1,208 ft (368 m)
- Interactive map of Clay Center Municipal Airport

Runways
Direction	Length		Surface
Direction	ft	m	Surface
17/35	4,199	1,280	Asphalt

Statistics (2016)
- Aircraft operations: 31,000
- Based aircraft: 15
- Source: Federal Aviation Administration

Clay Center Municipal Airport (ICAO: KCYW, FAA LID: CYW) is a city-owned, public-use airport two miles west of Clay Center, in Clay County, Kansas, United States. It opened on August 8, 1930.

Although most U.S. airports use the same three-letter location identifier for the FAA and IATA, Clay Center Municipal Airport is assigned CYW by the FAA but has no designation from the IATA.

== Facilities and aircraft ==
The airport covers 158 acres (64 ha); its one runway (17/35) is 4,199 x 75 ft (1,280 x 23 m) asphalt. For the 12-month period ending September 26, 2016, the airport had 31,000 aircraft operations, average 85 per day: 71% general aviation and 29% military. 15 single-engine aircraft were then based at the airport.

== See also ==
- List of airports in Kansas
