= Fort Scott Municipal Airport =

Airport in Fort Scott, Kansas, United States

Coordinates: 37°47′54″N 094°46′10″W

- IATA: FSK; ICAO: KFSK; FAA LID: FSK

Summary
- Airport type: Public
- Owner: City of Fort Scott
- Serves: Fort Scott, Kansas
- Elevation AMSL: 918 ft (280 m)
- Interactive map of Fort Scott Municipal Airport

Runways
Direction	Length		Surface
Direction	ft	m	Surface
18/36	4,403	1,342	Asphalt

Statistics (2006)
- Aircraft operations: 10,980
- Based aircraft: 18
- Source: Federal Aviation Administration

Fort Scott Municipal Airport (IATA: FSK, ICAO: KFSK, FAA LID: FSK) is a city-owned public-use airport located four miles (6 km) southwest of the central business district of Fort Scott, a city in Bourbon County, Kansas, United States.

== Facilities and aircraft ==
Fort Scott Municipal Airport covers an area of 245 acres (99 ha) which contains one asphalt paved runway (18/36) measuring 4,403 x 75 ft (1,342 x 23 m). For the 12-month period ending May 10, 2006, the airport had 10,980 aircraft operations, an average of 30 per day: 96% general aviation, 2% air taxi and 2% military. At that time there were 18 aircraft based at this airport: 67% single-engine and 33% multi-engine.

== See also ==
- List of airports in Kansas
