= Miami County Airport =

Airport in Kansas, United States

- IATA: none; ICAO: none; FAA LID: K81

Summary
- Airport type: Public
- Owner: Miami County
- Location: Paola, Kansas
- Elevation AMSL: 943 ft / 287.4 m
- Coordinates: 38°32′24″N 094°55′12″W
- Website: http://www.miamicountyks.org/137/Airport

Map
- Location of airport in Kansas

Runways
Direction	Length		Surface
Direction	ft	m	Surface
3/21	3,398	1,036	Asphalt
15/33	2,572	784	Turf

Miami County Airport (ICAO: K81, FAA LID: K81) is a public airport 3 miles (4.8 km) southwest of Paola, in Miami County, Kansas. The airport was founded in December 1951.

== See also ==
- List of airports in Kansas
