= St. Mary's Airpark =

- IATA: none; ICAO: none; FAA LID: 8K4

Summary
- Airport type: Public use
- Owner: St. Mary's Airpark
- Serves: St. Marys, Kansas
- Elevation AMSL: 1,220 ft / 372 m
- Coordinates: 39°16′21″N 096°03′41″W

Map
- Location of airport in Kansas

Runways
Direction	Length		Surface
Direction	ft	m	Surface
18/36	2,514	766	Turf/gravel

Statistics (2008)
- Aircraft operations: 550
- Source: Federal Aviation Administration

St. Mary's Airpark (FAA LID: 8K4) is a privately owned, public use airport in Pottawatomie County, Kansas, United States. It is located four nautical miles (7 km) north of the central business district of St. Marys, Kansas.

== Facilities and aircraft ==
St. Mary's Airpark has one runway designated 18/36 with a turf and gravel surface measuring 2,514 by 60 feet (766 x 18 m).

For the 12-month period ending September 30, 2008, the airport had 550 aircraft operations, an average of 45 per month: 54.5% general aviation and 45.5% military.

== See also ==
- List of airports in Kansas
