= Norwich Airport (Kansas) =

Airport in Kansas, US

- IATA: none; ICAO: none; FAA LID: 49K

Summary
- Airport type: Public
- Owner: City of Norwich
- Serves: Norwich, Kansas
- Elevation AMSL: 1,494 ft / 455 m
- Coordinates: 37°27′20″N 097°50′06″W

Map
- Location of airport in Kansas

Runways
Direction	Length		Surface
Direction	ft	m	Surface
17/35	3,230	985	Turf

Statistics (2011)
- Aircraft operations: 470
- Based aircraft: 8
- Source: Federal Aviation Administration

Norwich Airport (FAA LID: 49K) is a city-owned, public-use airport located one nautical mile (2 km) east of the central business district of Norwich, a city in Kingman County, Kansas, United States.

== Facilities and aircraft ==
Norwich Airport covers an area of 10 acres (4 ha) at an elevation of 1,494 feet (455 m) above mean sea level. It has one runway designated 17/35 with a turf surface measuring 3,230 by 80 feet (985 x 24 m).

For the 12-month period ending September 23, 2011, the airport had 470 general aviation aircraft operations, an average of 39 per month. At that time there were eight aircraft based at this airport: 75% single-engine and 25% ultralight.

== See also ==
- List of airports in Kansas
