= Hill City Municipal Airport =

- IATA: HLC; ICAO: KHLC; FAA LID: HLC

Summary
- Airport type: Public
- Owner: City of Hill City
- Serves: Hill City, Kansas
- Elevation AMSL: 2,238 ft (682 m)
- Coordinates: 39°22′49″N 099°49′53″W
- Interactive map of Hill City Municipal Airport

Runways
Direction	Length		Surface
Direction	ft	m	Surface
18/36	5,000	1,524	Concrete

Statistics (2006)
- Aircraft operations: 14,600
- Based aircraft: 10
- Source: Federal Aviation Administration

Hill City Municipal Airport (IATA: HLC, ICAO: KHLC, FAA LID: HLC) is a mile northeast of Hill City, in Graham County, Kansas.

== Facilities ==
The airport covers 183 acres (74 ha) at an elevation of 2,238 feet (682 m). Its one runway, 18/36, is 5,000 by 75 feet (1,524 x 23 m) concrete.

In the year ending October 30, 2006, the airport had 14,600 aircraft operations,an average of 40 per day: 99% general aviation and 1% air taxi. Ten aircraft were then based at the airport, all single-engine.

== See also ==
- List of airports in Kansas
