= Stanton County Municipal Airport =

- IATA: none; ICAO: KJHN; FAA LID: JHN

Summary
- Airport type: Public
- Owner: Stanton County
- Serves: Stanton County, Kansas
- Location: Johnson, Kansas
- Elevation AMSL: 3,325 ft / 1,013 m
- Coordinates: 37°35′07″N 101°43′56″W

Map
- Location of airport in Kansas

Runways
Direction	Length		Surface
Direction	ft	m	Surface
17/35	5,200	1,585	Concrete
8/26	1,889	576	Asphalt

Statistics (2011)
- Aircraft operations: 23,100
- Based aircraft: 35
- Source: Federal Aviation Administration

Stanton County Municipal Airport (ICAO: KJHN, FAA LID: JHN, formerly 2K3) is a county-owned, public-use airport in Stanton County, Kansas, United States. It is located two nautical miles (4 km) northeast of the central business district of Johnson, Kansas, which is also known as Johnson City. This airport was included in the National Plan of Integrated Airport Systems for 2011–2015, which categorized it as a general aviation facility.

Although most U.S. airports use the same three-letter location identifier for the FAA and IATA, this airport is assigned JHN by the FAA, but has no designation from the IATA.

== Facilities and aircraft ==
Stanton County Municipal Airport covers an area of 312 acres (126 ha) at an elevation of 3,325 feet (1,013 m) above mean sea level. It has two runways: 17/35 is 5,200 by 75 feet (1,585 x 23 m) with a concrete surface and 8/26 is 1,889 by 60 feet (576 x 18 m) with an asphalt surface.

For the 12-month period ending September 22, 2011, the airport had 23,100 aircraft operations, an average of 63 per day: 99.6% general aviation and 0.4% air taxi. At that time there were 35 aircraft based at this airport: 80% single-engine, 9% multi-engine, 6% jet, and 6% glider.

== See also ==
- List of airports in Kansas
