= Cheyenne County Municipal Airport =

- IATA: none; ICAO: KSYF; FAA LID: SYF

Summary
- Airport type: Public
- Owner: City of St. Francis
- Location: St. Francis, Kansas
- Elevation AMSL: 3,430 ft (1,050 m)
- Coordinates: 39°45′40″N 101°47′45″W
- Interactive map of Cheyenne County Municipal Airport

Runways
Direction	Length		Surface
Direction	ft	m	Surface
14/32	5,200	1,585	Concrete
18/36	2,313	705	Turf

Statistics (2022)
- Aircraft operations (year ending 9/27/2022): 3,800
- Based aircraft: 10
- Source: Federal Aviation Administration

Cheyenne County Municipal Airport (ICAO: KSYF, FAA LID: SYF) is a public airport located one mile (2 km) south of the central business district of St. Francis, a city in Cheyenne County, Kansas, United States. This airport is publicly owned by City of St. Francis.

Although most U.S. airports use the same three-letter location identifier for the FAA and IATA, Cheyenne County Municipal Airport is assigned SYF by the FAA but has no designation from the IATA (which assigned SYF to Silva Bay on Gabriola Island in British Columbia, Canada). The airport's ICAO identifier is KSYF.

== Facilities and aircraft ==
Cheyenne County Municipal Airport covers an area of 307 acres (124 ha) which contains two runways:

- Runway 14/32: 5,200 X 75 ft (1,585 x 23 m), surface: concrete
- Runway 18/36: 2,313 x 280 ft (705 x 85 m), surface: turf

For 12-month period ending September 27, 2022, the airport had 3,800 aircraft operations, an average of 73 per week: 100% general aviation. There were at the time 10 aircraft based at this airport, 9 single-engine, and 1 multi-engine.

== See also ==
- List of airports in Kansas
