= Garnett Municipal Airport =

Airport in Anderson County, Kansas

- IATA: none; ICAO: none; FAA LID: K68

Summary
- Airport type: Public
- Owner: City of Garnett
- Serves: Garnett, Kansas
- Elevation AMSL: 989 ft (301 m)
- Coordinates: 38°16′38″N 095°12′55″W
- Interactive map of Garnett Municipal Airport

Runways
Direction	Length		Surface
Direction	ft	m	Surface
1/19	2,660	811	Asphalt

Statistics (2008)
- Aircraft operations: 11,060
- Based aircraft: 10
- Source: Federal Aviation Administration

Garnett Municipal Airport (FAA LID: K68) is a city-owned public-use airport located two nautical miles (4 km) east of the central business district of Garnett, a city in Anderson County, Kansas, United States.

== Facilities and aircraft ==
Garnett Municipal Airport covers an area of 154 acres (62 ha) at an elevation of 989 feet (301 m) above mean sea level. It has one asphalt paved runway designated 1/19 which measures 2,660 by 45 feet (811 x 14 m).

For the 12-month period ending July 24, 2008, the airport had 11,060 aircraft operations, an average of 30 per day: 99% general aviation and 1% military. At that time there were 10 aircraft based at this airport: 80% single-engine and 20% multi-engine.

== See also ==
- List of airports in Kansas
