= Paul Windle Municipal Airport =

Airport in Kansas, United States

- IATA: none; ICAO: none; FAA LID: 8K7

Summary
- Airport type: Closed, no longer in use
- Owner: City of Greensburg
- Serves: Greensburg, Kansas
- Elevation AMSL: 2,230 ft (680 m)
- Coordinates: 37°36′16″N 099°16′23″W
- Interactive map of Paul Windle Municipal Airport

Runways
Direction	Length		Surface
Direction	ft	m	Surface
2/20 (closed)	2,600	792	Turf
17/35 (closed)	2,400	732	Turf

Statistics (2008)
- Aircraft operations: 0
- Source: FAA, with corrected coordinates from WikiMapia

Paul Windle Municipal Airport (FAA LID: 8K7) is a closed and no longer used airport located east of the central business district of Greensburg, a city in Kiowa County, Kansas, United States. The airport was owned by the City of Greensburg and named in honor of Captain Paul R. "Windy" Windle (1934-1965) who learned to fly at this airport and was killed in action during the Vietnam War.

== Facilities and aircraft ==
Paul Windle Municipal Airport covered an area of 71 acres (29 ha) at an elevation of 2,230 feet (680 m) above mean sea level. It has two runways, both now closed, with turf surfaces: 2/20 was 2,600 by 130 feet (792 x 40 m) and 17/35 was 2,400 by 290 feet (732 x 88 m).
