= Stockton Municipal Airport (Kansas) =

Airport in Kansas, United States

- IATA: none; ICAO: none; FAA LID: 0S2

Summary
- Airport type: Public
- Owner: City of Stockton
- Serves: Stockton, Kansas
- Elevation AMSL: 1,973 ft (601 m)
- Coordinates: 39°22′41″N 099°17′44″W

Map
- Location of airport in Kansas

Runways
Direction	Length		Surface
Direction	ft	m	Surface
17/35	3,500	1,067	Turf

Statistics (2010)
- Aircraft operations: 650
- Source: Federal Aviation Administration

Stockton Municipal Airport (FAA LID: 0S2) is a city-owned, public-use airport located three nautical miles (6 km) southwest of the central business district of Stockton, a city in Rooks County, Kansas, United States.

== Facilities and aircraft ==
Stockton Municipal Airport covers an area of 116 acres (47 ha) at an elevation of 1,973 feet (601 m) above mean sea level. It has one runway designated 17/35 with a turf surface measuring 3,500 by 240 feet (1,067 x 73 m). For the 12-month period ending May 27, 2010, the airport had 650 aircraft operations, an average of 54 per month: 100% general aviation.
