= Rooks County Regional Airport =

- IATA: none; ICAO: KRCP; FAA LID: RCP

Summary
- Airport type: Public
- Owner: Rooks County Airport Commission
- Serves: Stockton, Kansas
- Elevation AMSL: 1,998 ft / 609 m
- Coordinates: 39°20′48″N 099°18′17″W
- Website: RooksCounty.net/...

Map
- Location in Kansas

Runways
Direction	Length		Surface
Direction	ft	m	Surface
18/36	5,000	1,524	Concrete
- Source: Federal Aviation Administration

Rooks County Regional Airport (ICAO: KRCP, FAA LID: RCP) is in Rooks County, Kansas. Owned by the Rooks County Airport Commission, it is six miles south of Stockton, Kansas and seven miles north of Plainville, Kansas.

Most U.S. airports use the same three-letter location identifier for the FAA and IATA, but this airport is RCP to the FAA and has no IATA code. (Cinder River, Alaska has IATA code RCP.)

== Facilities ==
The airport covers 459 acres (186 ha) at an elevation of 1,998 feet (609 m). Its one runway, 18/36, is 5,000 by 75 feet (1,524 x 23 m) concrete.

== See also ==
- List of airports in Kansas
