= Coffey County Airport =

Airport in Kansas, United States

Coordinates: 38°18′09″N 095°43′30″W

- IATA: none; ICAO: KUKL; FAA LID: UKL

Summary
- Airport type: Public
- Owner: County of Coffey
- Serves: Burlington, Kansas
- Elevation AMSL: 1,174 ft (358 m)
- Interactive map of Coffey County Airport

Runways
Direction	Length		Surface
Direction	ft	m	Surface
18/36	5,500	1,676	Concrete

Statistics (2018)
- Aircraft operations: 20,050
- Based aircraft: 16
- Source: Federal Aviation Administration

Coffey County Airport (ICAO: KUKL, FAA LID: UKL) is a county-owned public-use airport located seven miles (11 km) north of the central business district of Burlington, a city in Coffey County, Kansas, United States.

Although most U.S. airports use the same three-letter location identifier for the FAA and IATA, Coffey County Airport is assigned UKL by the FAA but has no designation from the IATA.

== Facilities and aircraft ==
Coffey County Airport covers an area of 960 acres (390 ha) which contains one concrete paved runway (18/36) measuring 5,500 ft × 75 ft (1,676 m × 23 m). For the 12-month period ending August 9, 2018, the airport had 20,050 aircraft operations, an average of 55 per day: 100% general aviation and <1% military. At that time there were 16 aircraft based at this airport: 16 single-engine.

== See also ==
- List of airports in Kansas
