= Augusta Municipal Airport =

Airport in Augusta, Kansas

Coordinates: 37°40′17″N 097°04′40″W

- IATA: none; ICAO: none; FAA LID: 3AU

Summary
- Airport type: Public
- Owner: City of Augusta
- Serves: Augusta, Kansas
- Elevation AMSL: 1,328 ft (405 m)
- Website: flyaugustaks.com

Map

Runways
Direction	Length		Surface
Direction	ft	m	Surface
18/36	4,199	1,280	Asphalt

Statistics (2015)
- Aircraft operations: 36,000
- Based aircraft: 105
- Source: Federal Aviation Administration

Augusta Municipal Airport (FAA LID: 3AU) is located approximately 5 miles (8.0 km) west of Augusta in Butler County, Kansas, United States, on the south side of US-54/US-400 highway. The airport is in the Wichita Metropolitan Service Area and benefits from the many area manufacturers of general aviation aircraft. It is owned by the city of Augusta.

== Facilities ==
The airport covers 140 acres (57 ha); its one runway, 18/36, is 4,199 x 60 ft (1,280 x 18 m) asphalt.

In the year ending June 30, 2015 the airport had 36,000 general aviation aircraft operations, average 99 per day. 105 aircraft are based at this airport in 2015: 85% single-engine and 15% multi-engine with one jet and four helicopters. The airport has seven independent T-Hangar buildings, each holding up to ten aircraft. The airport and city of Augusta are in the process of adding up to four additional T-hangars in the near term, adding storage capacity for up to forty aircraft.

== Nearby airports ==
Other airports in Wichita

- Wichita Mid-Continent Airport
- Colonel James Jabara Airport
- Beech Factory Airport
- Cessna Aircraft Field
- McConnell Air Force Base
- Westport Airport

Other airports in metro

- El Dorado / Captain Jack Thomas Airport

Other airports in region

- List of airports in Kansas
- List of airports in Oklahoma
