= Abilene Municipal Airport =

Coordinates: 38°54′15″N 097°14′09″W

- IATA: none; ICAO: none; FAA LID: K78

Summary
- Airport type: Public
- Owner: City of Abilene
- Serves: Abilene, Kansas
- Elevation AMSL: 1,152 ft (351 m)
- Interactive map of Abilene Municipal Airport

Runways
Direction	Length		Surface
Direction	ft	m	Surface
17/35	4,100	1,250	Asphalt

Statistics (2022)
- Aircraft operations (year ending 10/24/2022): 35,600
- Based aircraft: 17
- Source: Federal Aviation Administration

Abilene Municipal Airport (FAA LID: K78) is a city-owned public airport located one mile southwest of Abilene, in Dickinson County, Kansas, United States.

== Facilities ==
Abilene Municipal Airport covers 195 acres (79 ha) and has one asphalt runway, 17/35, 4,100 x 75 ft (1,250 x 23 m). For the 12-month period ending October 24, 2022, the airport had 35,600 aircraft operations, average 97 per day: 98% general aviation, 1% air taxi and <1% military. 17 aircraft are based at the airport: all single-engine.

The Kansas State University Parachute Club has operated at the airport most weekends since 2012, offering tandem skydives and solo skydive training.

== See also ==
- List of airports in Kansas
