= Gardner Municipal Airport (Kansas) =

- IATA: none; ICAO: none; FAA LID: K34

Summary
- Airport type: Public
- Owner/Operator: City of Gardner
- Location: Gardner, Kansas
- Elevation AMSL: 1,042 ft (318 m)
- Coordinates: 38°48′25″N 094°57′22″W
- Interactive map of Gardner Municipal Airport

Runways
Direction	Length		Surface
Direction	ft	m	Surface
3/21	2,154	657	Turf
8/26	2,960	902	Asphalt
17/35	3,373	1,028	Turf

Statistics (2004)
- Aircraft operations: 51,500
- Based aircraft: 96
- Source: Federal Aviation Administration

Gardner Municipal Airport (FAA LID: K34) is a public airport located one mile (2 km) west of the central business district of Gardner, a city in Johnson County, Kansas, United States. It is publicly owned by the City of Gardner.

== Facilities and aircraft ==
Gardner Municipal Airport covers an area of 129 acres (52 ha) which contains three runways:

- Runway 3/21: 2,154 x 80 ft (657 x 24 m), surface: turf
- Runway 8/26: 2,960 x 39 ft (902 x 12 m), surface: asphalt
- Runway 17/35: 3,373 x 90 ft (1,028 x 27 m), surface: turf

For the 12-month period ending April 30, 2004, the airport had 51,500 general aviation aircraft operations, an average of 141 per day. There are 96 aircraft based at this airport: 90 single-engine, 4 ultralights and 2 gliders.

== See also ==
- List of airports in Kansas
