= Plainville, Kansas =

City in Rooks County, Kansas

- City
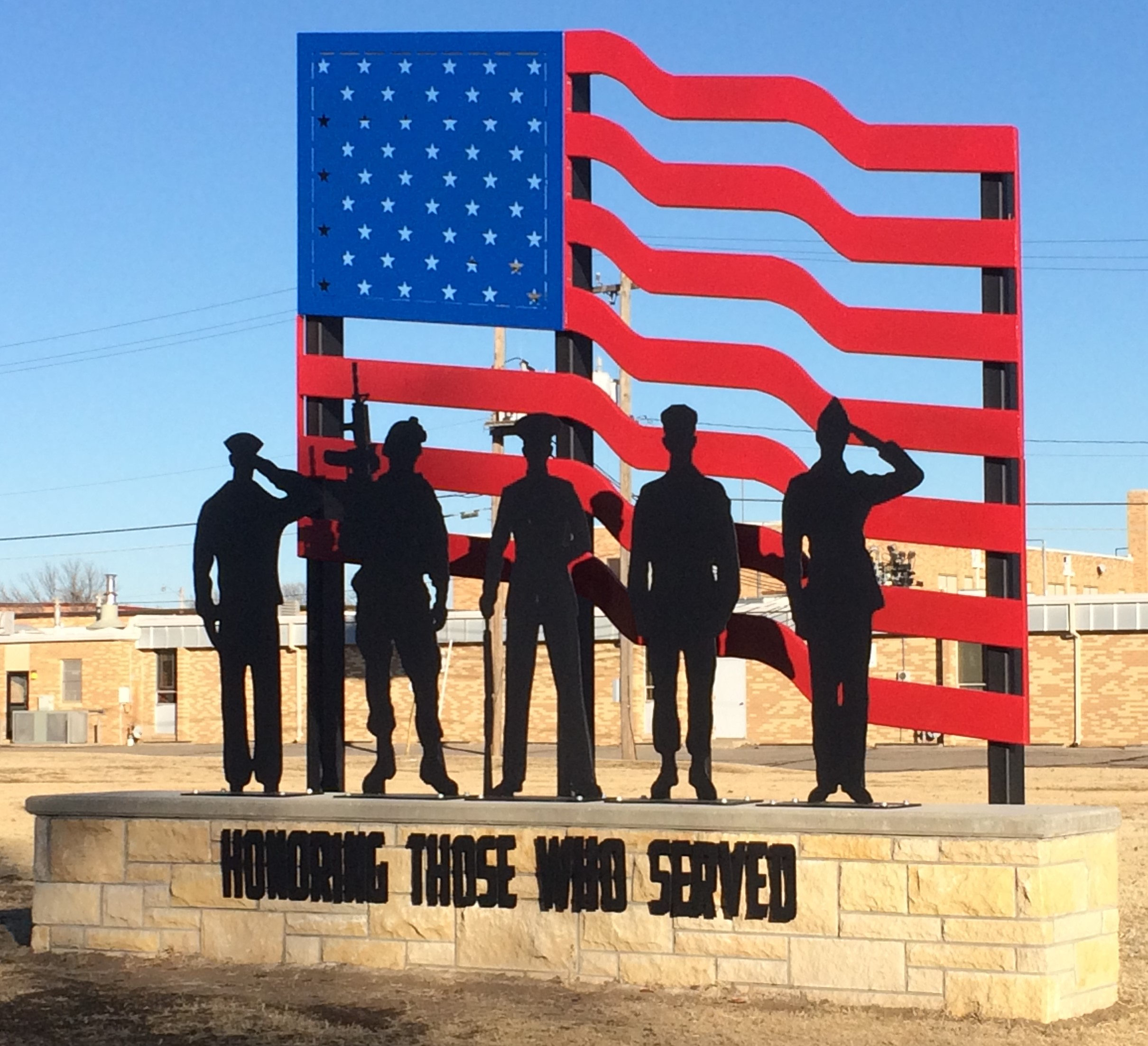
- Plainville Veterans Memorial (2016)

- Location within Rooks County and Kansas

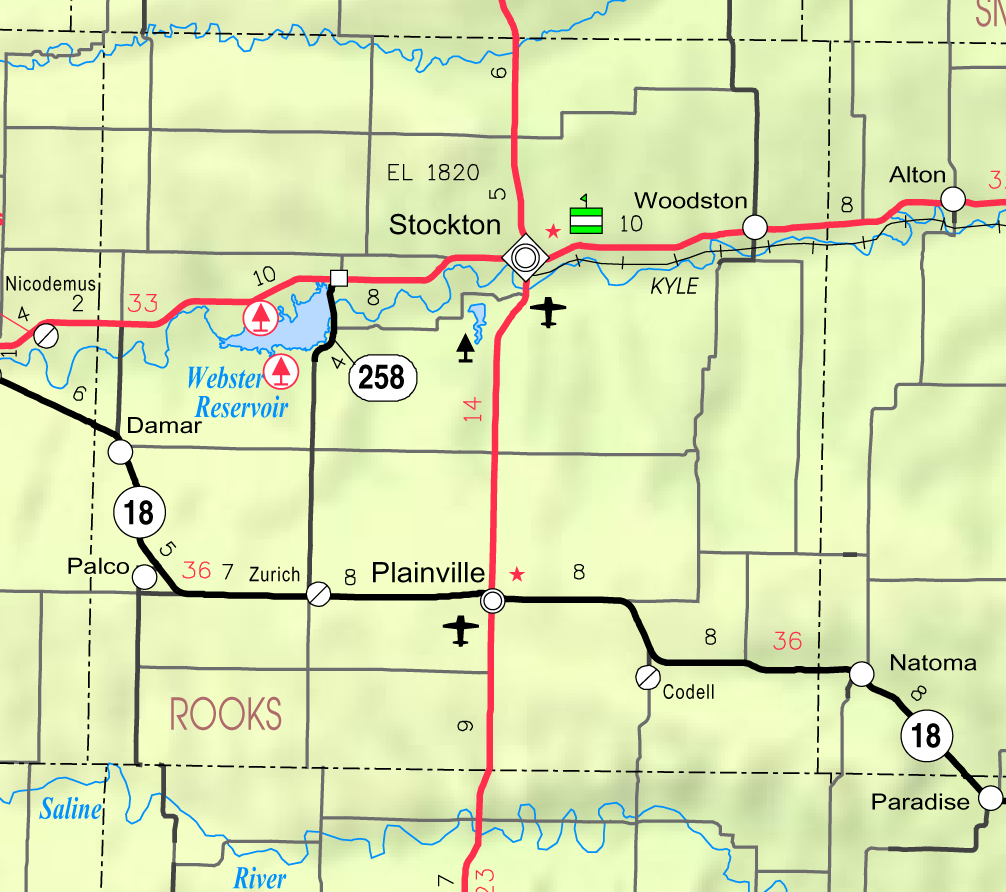
- KDOT map of Rooks County (legend)
- Coordinates: 39°14′03″N 99°18′03″W
- Country: United States
- State: Kansas
- County: Rooks
- Founded: 1870s
- Incorporated: 1888
- Named for: Plain

Area
  - Total: 1.20 sq mi (3.10 km^{2})
  - Land: 1.20 sq mi (3.10 km^{2})
  - Water: 0 sq mi (0.00 km^{2})
- Elevation: 2,149 ft (655 m)

Population (2020)
  - Total: 1,746
  - Density: 1,460/sq mi (563/km^{2})
- Time zone: UTC-6 (CST)
  - Summer (DST): UTC-5 (CDT)
- ZIP Code: 67663
- Area code: 785
- FIPS code: 20-56150
- GNIS ID: 2396222
- Website: plainvilleks.com

Plainville is a city in Rooks County, Kansas, United States. As of the 2020 census, the population of the city was 1,746. It was named from its setting upon the plains.

== History ==
Washington Irving Griffin settled along a freight trail in an area known as Paradise Flats in 1877. In order to establish a post office, Griffin completed a US Postal Service application that required the signature of the local Justice of the Peace. While reviewing the application, Justice of the Peace Lambert P. Darland suggested the name "Plainville". Griffin operated the Plainville post office and a small store from his sod house, the first structure in what would become the city of Plainville.

In 1888, Plainville filed for incorporation with 500 residents. Dan E. Miller was elected the first mayor. The first city council consisted of Dr. Volney M. Gray, Murray C. Knox, John Mullin, George Brooks and David E. Mickey.

Union Pacific Railroad established an east–west route through Plainville in August 1888. The train tracks ran parallel to Mill Street, approximately one block to the north. The Train Depot was located on the northwest corner of N First Street and Meridian Street. A Roundhouse was located at N First Street and Madison Street.

Plainville Mill & Elevator Co., (est. 1893) was a major employer and purchaser of locally grown wheat. The original mill was destroyed by fire in 1899 and soon replaced by a larger mill. The flour produced by the mill was of such fine quality, the company won a gold medal at the 1904 World's Fair. The mill was again destroyed by fire in 1950. Plainville Mill & Elevator Co. was located on N First Street between Madison and Meridian Streets.

In 1909, fire devastated the Plainville business district. The fire apparently started in a butcher shop on the south side of Mill Street in the early morning hours. Fire quickly spread to the north side of Mill Street. Seventeen structures were destroyed before the fire was contained. The burned out wooden buildings were replaced with stone and brick structures, many still standing on Mill Street today.

Oil was discovered in Rooks County in 1927. The oil boom brought significant growth to Plainville in the 1940s and 1950s. The Bemis-Shutts oil field in the Saline River valley south of Plainville is one of the largest oil producers in the state of Kansas.

== Geography ==
Plainville lies in the Smoky Hills region of the Great Plains on the north side of Paradise Creek, a tributary of the Saline River. Southwest of the city, the creek has been dammed to form a small reservoir, Plainville Township Lake. Plainville is approximately 9 miles (14 km) north of the Saline River and 13 miles (21 km) south of the South Fork Solomon River. Located in north-central Kansas at the intersection of U.S. Route 183 and K-18, Plainville is approximately 150 miles (240 km) northwest of Wichita and 253 miles (407 km) west of Kansas City.

According to the United States Census Bureau, the city has a total area of 1.24 square miles (3.21 km^{2}), all land.

=== Climate ===
Plainville has a humid continental climate (Köppen Dfa) with hot, humid summers and cold, dry winters. The average yearly temperature in Plainville is 51.9 °F (11 °C), and, on average, the city receives 23.2 inches (589 mm) of precipitation a year. Snowfall averages 23.3 inches (592 mm) per year. On average, January is the coolest month, July is the warmest month, and May is the wettest month. The hottest temperature recorded in Plainville was 114 °F (46 °C) in 1940; the coldest temperature recorded was -29 °F (-34 °C) in 1989.

Climate data for Plainville 4WNW, Kansas (1991–2020 normals, extremes 1904–present)
| Month | Jan | Feb | Mar | Apr | May | Jun | Jul | Aug | Sep | Oct | Nov | Dec | Year |
|---|---|---|---|---|---|---|---|---|---|---|---|---|---|
| Record high °F (°C) | 83 (28) | 87 (31) | 94 (34) | 102 (39) | 103 (39) | 114 (46) | 116 (47) | 113 (45) | 112 (44) | 100 (38) | 88 (31) | 83 (28) | 116 (47) |
| Mean daily maximum °F (°C) | 41.3 (5.2) | 45.0 (7.2) | 56.2 (13.4) | 65.4 (18.6) | 74.6 (23.7) | 85.9 (29.9) | 91.3 (32.9) | 88.9 (31.6) | 81.4 (27.4) | 68.5 (20.3) | 54.6 (12.6) | 42.6 (5.9) | 66.3 (19.1) |
| Daily mean °F (°C) | 29.3 (−1.5) | 32.3 (0.2) | 42.3 (5.7) | 51.5 (10.8) | 61.8 (16.6) | 72.9 (22.7) | 78.2 (25.7) | 76.2 (24.6) | 68.0 (20.0) | 54.8 (12.7) | 41.6 (5.3) | 31.2 (−0.4) | 53.3 (11.8) |
| Mean daily minimum °F (°C) | 17.3 (−8.2) | 19.6 (−6.9) | 28.5 (−1.9) | 37.6 (3.1) | 49.0 (9.4) | 59.9 (15.5) | 65.2 (18.4) | 63.5 (17.5) | 54.5 (12.5) | 41.1 (5.1) | 28.6 (−1.9) | 19.9 (−6.7) | 40.4 (4.7) |
| Record low °F (°C) | −21 (−29) | −19 (−28) | −21 (−29) | 5 (−15) | 25 (−4) | 38 (3) | 45 (7) | 38 (3) | 26 (−3) | 6 (−14) | −8 (−22) | −29 (−34) | −29 (−34) |
| Average precipitation inches (mm) | 0.64 (16) | 0.83 (21) | 1.40 (36) | 2.22 (56) | 4.10 (104) | 3.28 (83) | 3.95 (100) | 3.64 (92) | 2.24 (57) | 1.71 (43) | 1.15 (29) | 0.95 (24) | 26.11 (663) |
| Average snowfall inches (cm) | 4.8 (12) | 5.4 (14) | 2.0 (5.1) | 1.2 (3.0) | 0.1 (0.25) | 0.0 (0.0) | 0.0 (0.0) | 0.0 (0.0) | 0.0 (0.0) | 0.6 (1.5) | 1.9 (4.8) | 3.7 (9.4) | 19.7 (50) |
| Average precipitation days (≥ 0.01 in) | 3.2 | 3.7 | 5.1 | 7.1 | 9.3 | 8.6 | 7.9 | 7.8 | 5.5 | 5.3 | 4.1 | 3.7 | 71.3 |
| Average snowy days (≥ 0.1 in) | 2.4 | 2.8 | 1.7 | 0.6 | 0.1 | 0.0 | 0.0 | 0.0 | 0.0 | 0.2 | 1.3 | 2.7 | 11.8 |
Source: NOAA

== Demographics ==
Historical population
| Census | Pop. | Note | %± |
|---|---|---|---|
| 1880 | 39 | | — |
| 1890 | 347 | | 789.7% |
| 1900 | 378 | | 8.9% |
| 1910 | 1,090 | | 188.4% |
| 1920 | 1,004 | | −7.9% |
| 1930 | 1,058 | | 5.4% |
| 1940 | 1,232 | | 16.4% |
| 1950 | 2,082 | | 69.0% |
| 1960 | 3,104 | | 49.1% |
| 1970 | 2,627 | | −15.4% |
| 1980 | 2,458 | | −6.4% |
| 1990 | 2,173 | | −11.6% |
| 2000 | 2,029 | | −6.6% |
| 2010 | 1,903 | | −6.2% |
| 2020 | 1,746 | | −8.3% |
U.S. Decennial Census

=== 2020 census ===
As of the 2020 census, Plainville had a population of 1,746 in 784 households, including 475 families. The population density was 1,459.9 per square mile (563.7/km^{2}). There were 921 housing units at an average density of 770.1 per square mile (297.3/km^{2}).

The median age was 39.9 years. 24.1% of residents were under the age of 18, 6.7% were ages 18 to 24, 24.1% were ages 25 to 44, 24.6% were ages 45 to 64, and 20.4% were age 65 or older. For every 100 females, there were 95.1 males, and for every 100 females age 18 and over there were 92.9 males age 18 and over.

There were 784 households, of which 28.4% had children under age 18. Of all households, 45.2% were married-couple households, 20.9% had a male householder with no spouse or partner present, and 28.3% had a female householder with no spouse or partner present. About 35.2% of households were made up of individuals, and 19.7% had someone living alone who was 65 years of age or older. There were 921 housing units, of which 14.9% were vacant; the homeowner vacancy rate was 4.0% and the rental vacancy rate was 8.4%.

0.0% of residents lived in urban areas, while 100.0% lived in rural areas.

Racial composition as of the 2020 census
| Race | Number | Percent |
|---|---|---|
| White | 1,666 | 95.4% |
| Black or African American | 6 | 0.3% |
| American Indian and Alaska Native | 5 | 0.3% |
| Asian | 2 | 0.1% |
| Native Hawaiian and Other Pacific Islander | 2 | 0.1% |
| Some other race | 6 | 0.3% |
| Two or more races | 59 | 3.4% |
| Hispanic or Latino (of any race) | 34 | 1.9% |

Of the total population, 94.33% were non-Hispanic White.

=== Demographic estimates ===
The 2016–2020 5-year American Community Survey estimates show an average household size of 2.3 and an average family size of 3.0. The percent of residents with a bachelor's degree or higher was estimated at 17.2%.

=== Income and poverty ===
The 2016–2020 5-year American Community Survey estimates show that the median household income was $52,946 (with a margin of error of +/- $7,568) and the median family income was $76,641 (+/- $16,219). Males had a median income of $38,851 (+/- $7,051) versus $21,875 (+/- $5,148) for females. The median income for those above 16 years old was $27,214 (+/- $3,453). Approximately, 1.5% of families and 4.4% of the population were below the poverty line, including 0.6% of those under the age of 18 and 15.9% of those ages 65 or over.

=== 2010 census ===
As of the census of 2010, there were 1,903 people, 819 households, and 516 families residing in the city. The population density was 1,534.7 inhabitants per square mile (592.6/km^{2}). There were 949 housing units at an average density of 765.3 per square mile (295.5/km^{2}). The racial makeup of the city was 98.0% White, 0.2% African American, 0.3% Native American, 0.1% Asian, 0.1% Pacific Islander, 0.5% from other races, and 0.9% from two or more races. Hispanic or Latino of any race were 1.5% of the population.

There were 819 households, of which 29.8% had children under the age of 18 living with them, 49.9% were married couples living together, 8.9% had a female householder with no husband present, 4.2% had a male householder with no wife present, and 37.0% were non-families. 32.8% of all households were made up of individuals, and 16% had someone living alone who was 65 years of age or older. The average household size was 2.28 and the average family size was 2.91.

The median age in the city was 41.5 years. 24.7% of residents were under the age of 18; 6.8% were between the ages of 18 and 24; 22.1% were from 25 to 44; 26.2% were from 45 to 64; and 20.2% were 65 years of age or older. The gender makeup of the city was 47.9% male and 52.1% female.

== Arts and culture ==
=== Points of interest ===
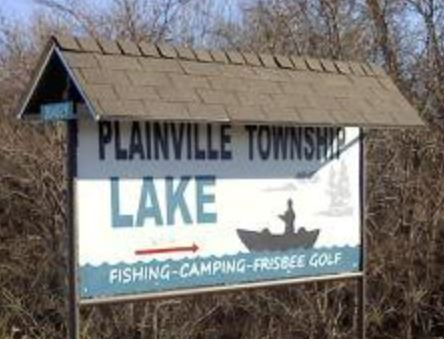
Plainville Township Lake (2016)

- Plainville Township Hall (1914)
- GAR Memorial (1925)
- Plainville Township Lake dam (1937)
- Rock Gym (1937)
- Plainville Junior High School building (1939)
- Plainville Rural High School (1952)
- Scout House (1964)
- Clarence Audburn Gilbert memorial (1966)
- Veterans Memorial (2016)

== Parks and recreation ==
Max Malin Memorial Ballpark is a multi-field baseball complex.

Plainville City Park includes a playground, basketball court and swimming pool.

Plainville Township Lake is located a half mile west of town. Fishing, picnics and other outdoor recreation are popular activities.

Rooks County Golf Course is a nine-hole, public course located 5 miles north of Plainville.

== Education ==
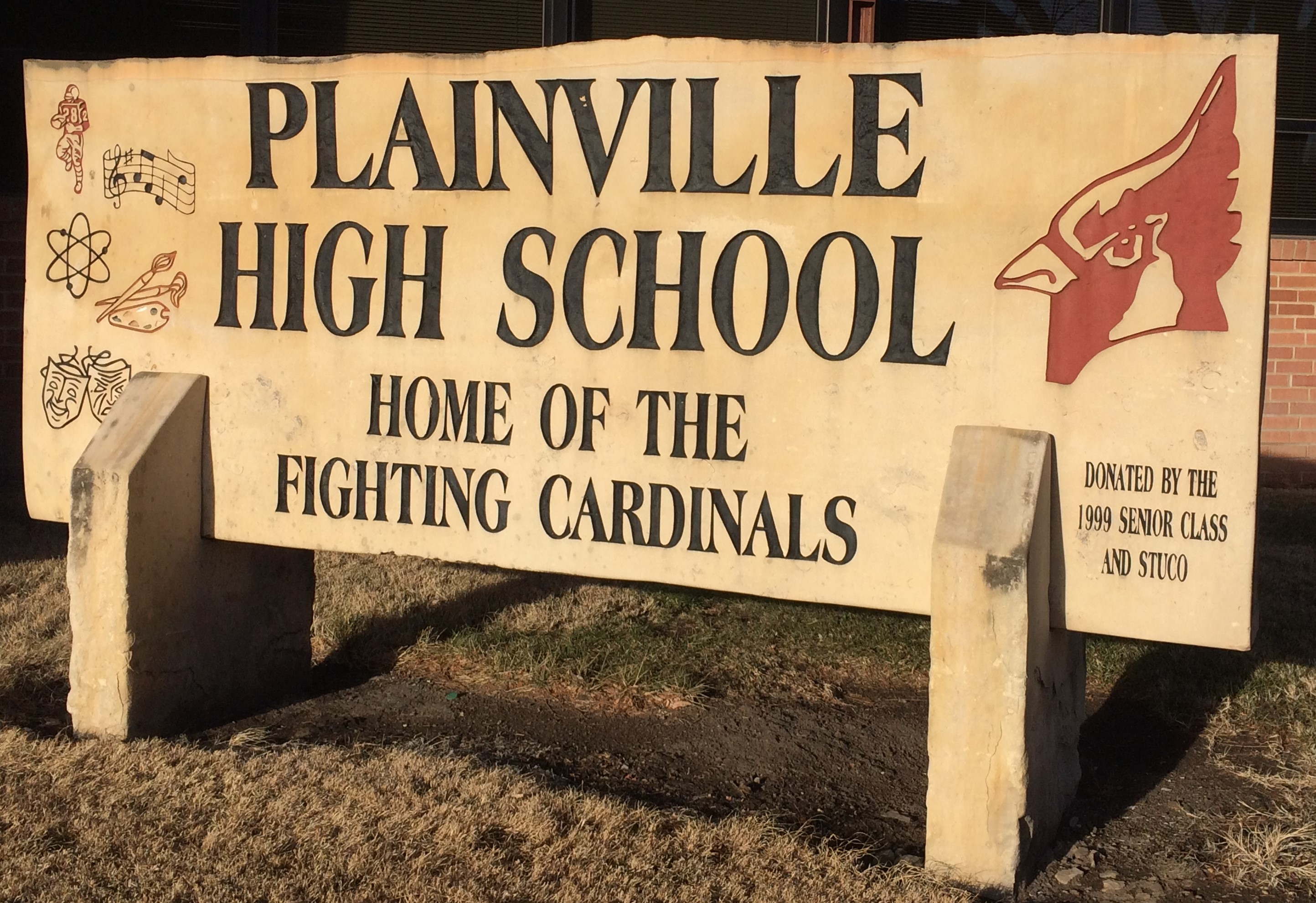
Plainville High School Sign (2016)

=== Public schools ===
The community is served by Plainville USD 270 public school district. The district has two schools.

- Plainville Jr-Sr High School
- Plainville Elementary School

Plainville High School Cardinals has won the following Kansas State High School championships:

- 1980 3A Football
- 1985 3A Football
- 1988 3-2-1A Wrestling
- 1992 3-2-1A Wrestling
- 2012 2A Boys Track & Field
- 2013 2A Boys Track & Field
- 2017 2A Boys Track & Field

=== Private schools ===
- Sacred Heart Grade School

=== Library ===
Plainville Memorial Library is a public library serving the community since 1902.

== Media ==
=== Newspaper ===
Plainville has one weekly newspaper, Plainville Times. Merged with the Stockton Sentinel in 2026.

=== Radio Station ===
Radio station KFIX is licensed to Plainville, but broadcasts from Hays, Kansas playing a Classic rock format.

== Infrastructure ==
=== Transportation ===
U.S. Route 183 runs north–south through Plainville, intersecting highway K-18 on the northern end of town.

Rooks County Regional Airport is located seven miles north of Plainville.

=== Healthcare ===
Rooks County Health Center is located on the north end of Plainville.

== Notable people ==
Notable individuals who were born in and/or have lived in Plainville include:

- Rob Beckley (1975– ), Christian artist
- Brent Collins (1941–1988), actor
- Dale Dodrill (1926–2019), NFL player
- Stephanie Grisham (1976– ), former White House official
- Jack Hartman (1925–1998), basketball coach
- Jerry Moran (1954– ), U.S. senator
- Carl Weeks (1876–1962), entrepreneur and philanthropist

== Gallery ==
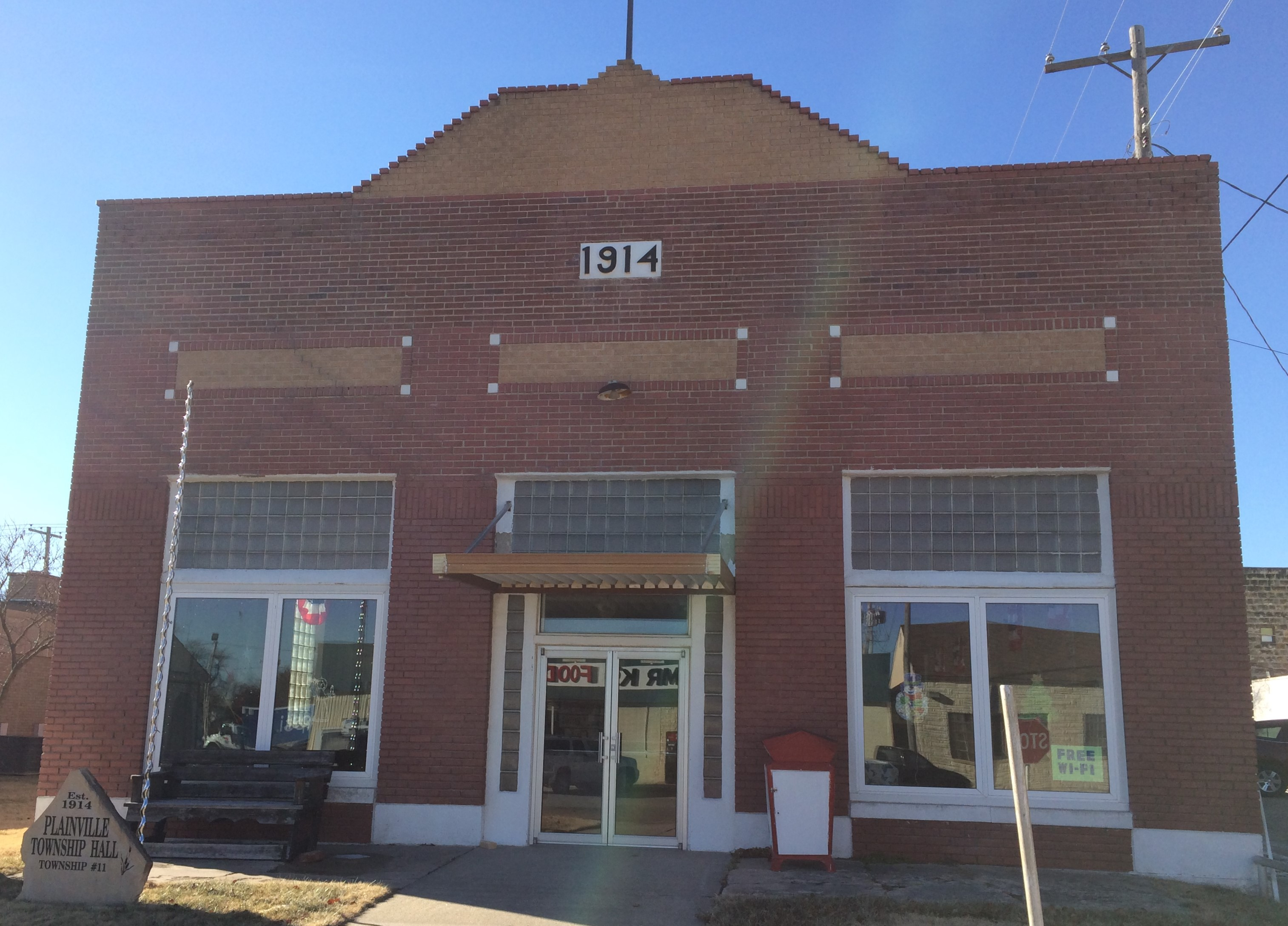
Township Hall

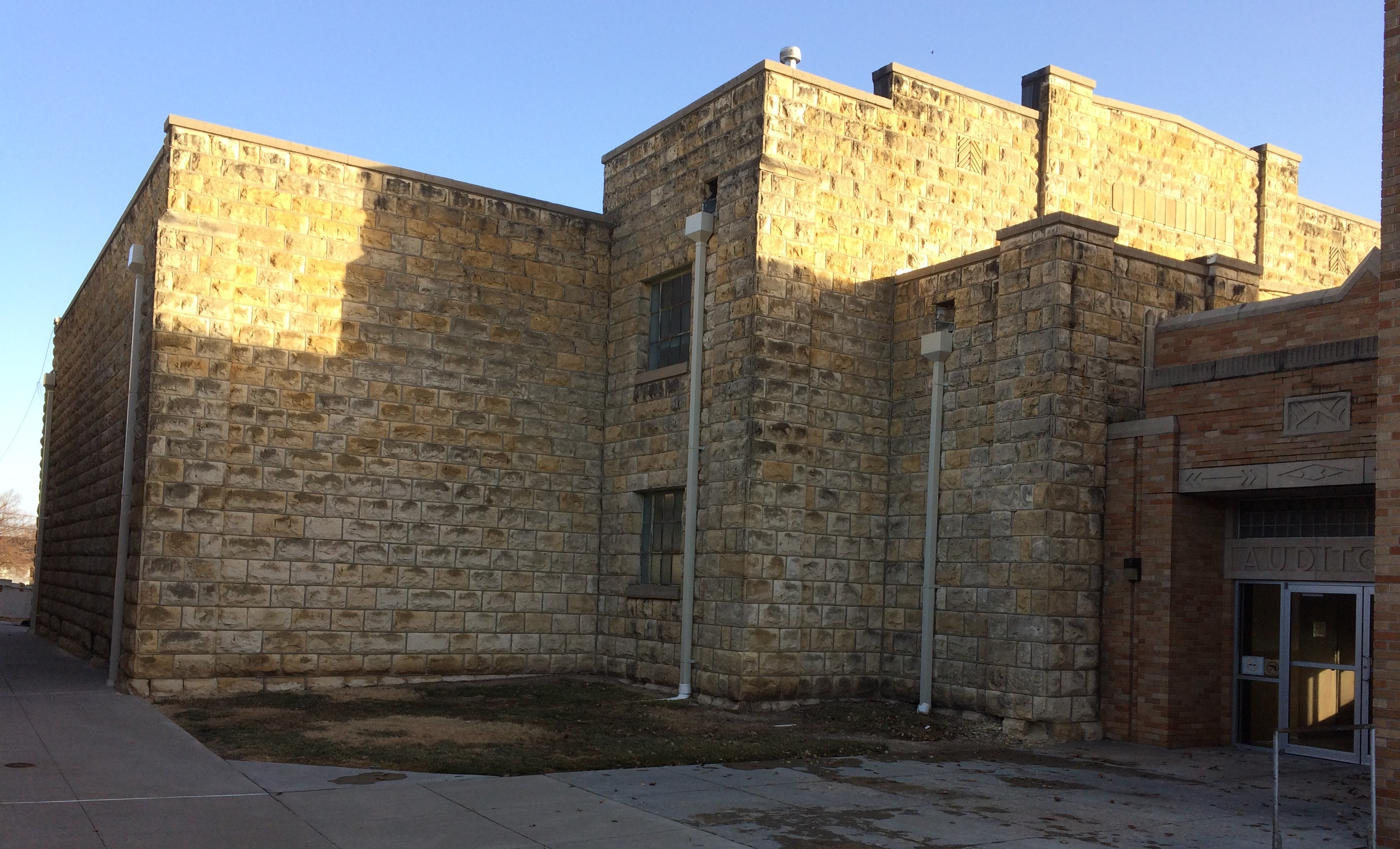
Rock Gym

GAR Memorial

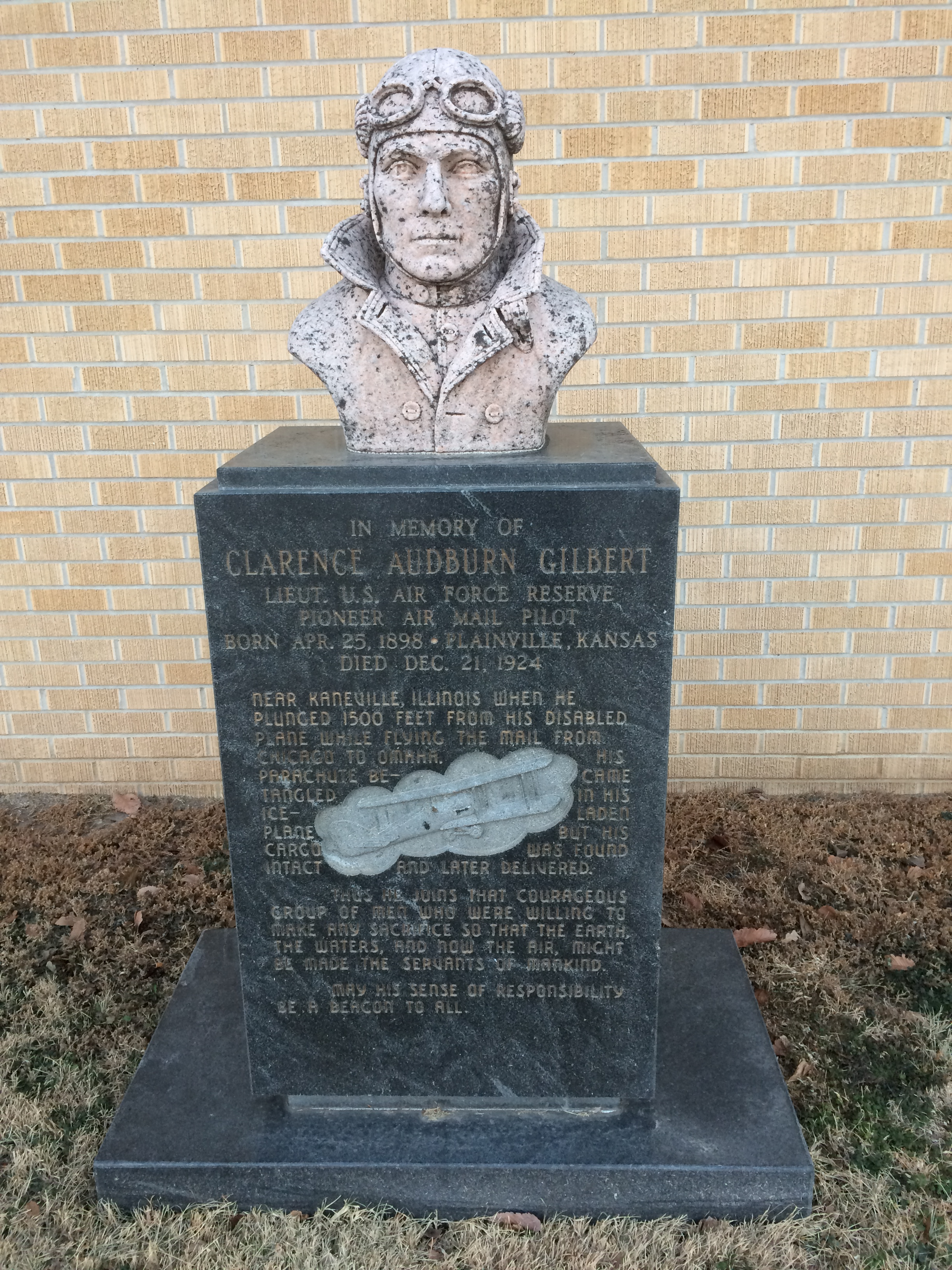
Clarence Audburn Gilbert Memorial

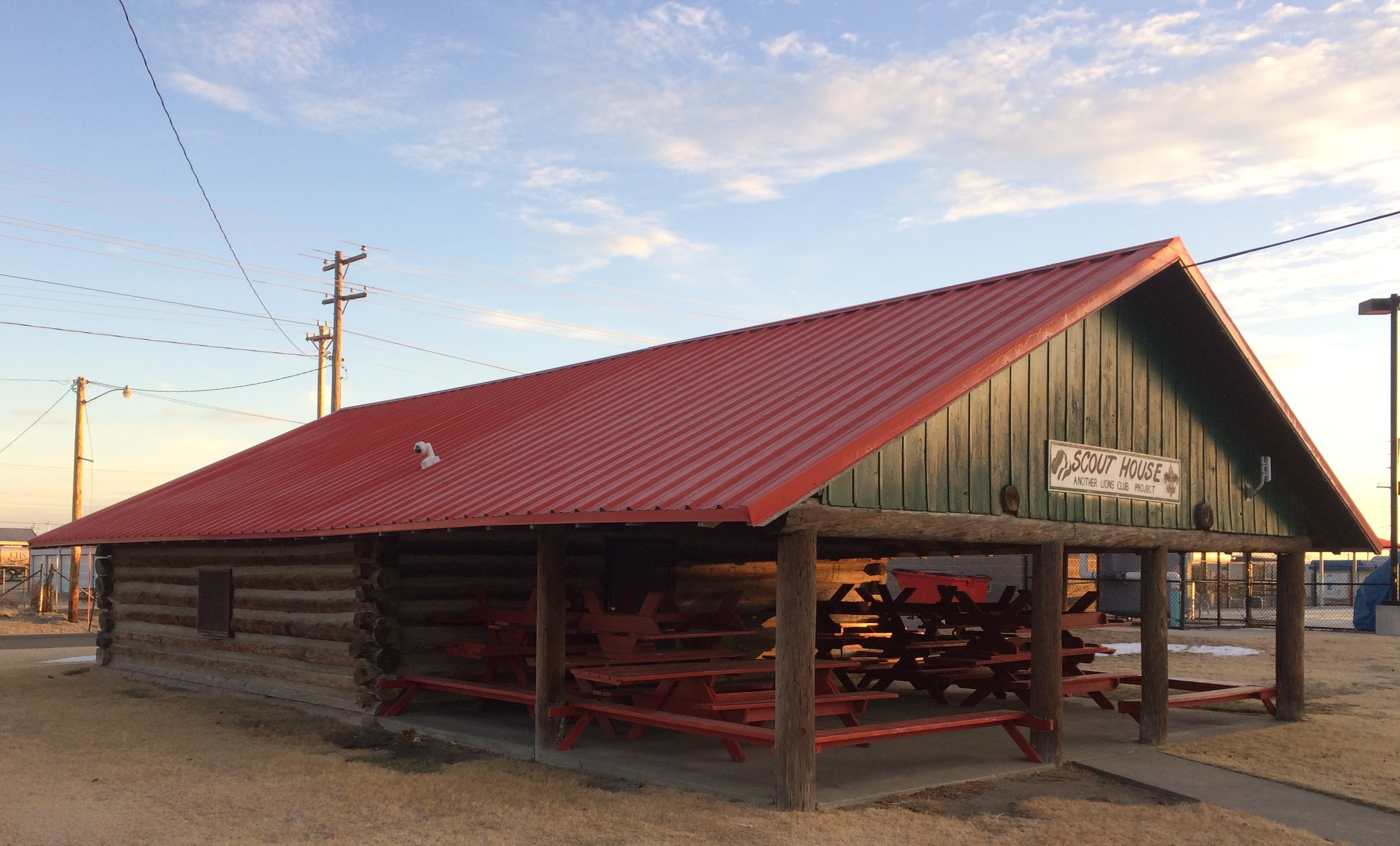
Scout House

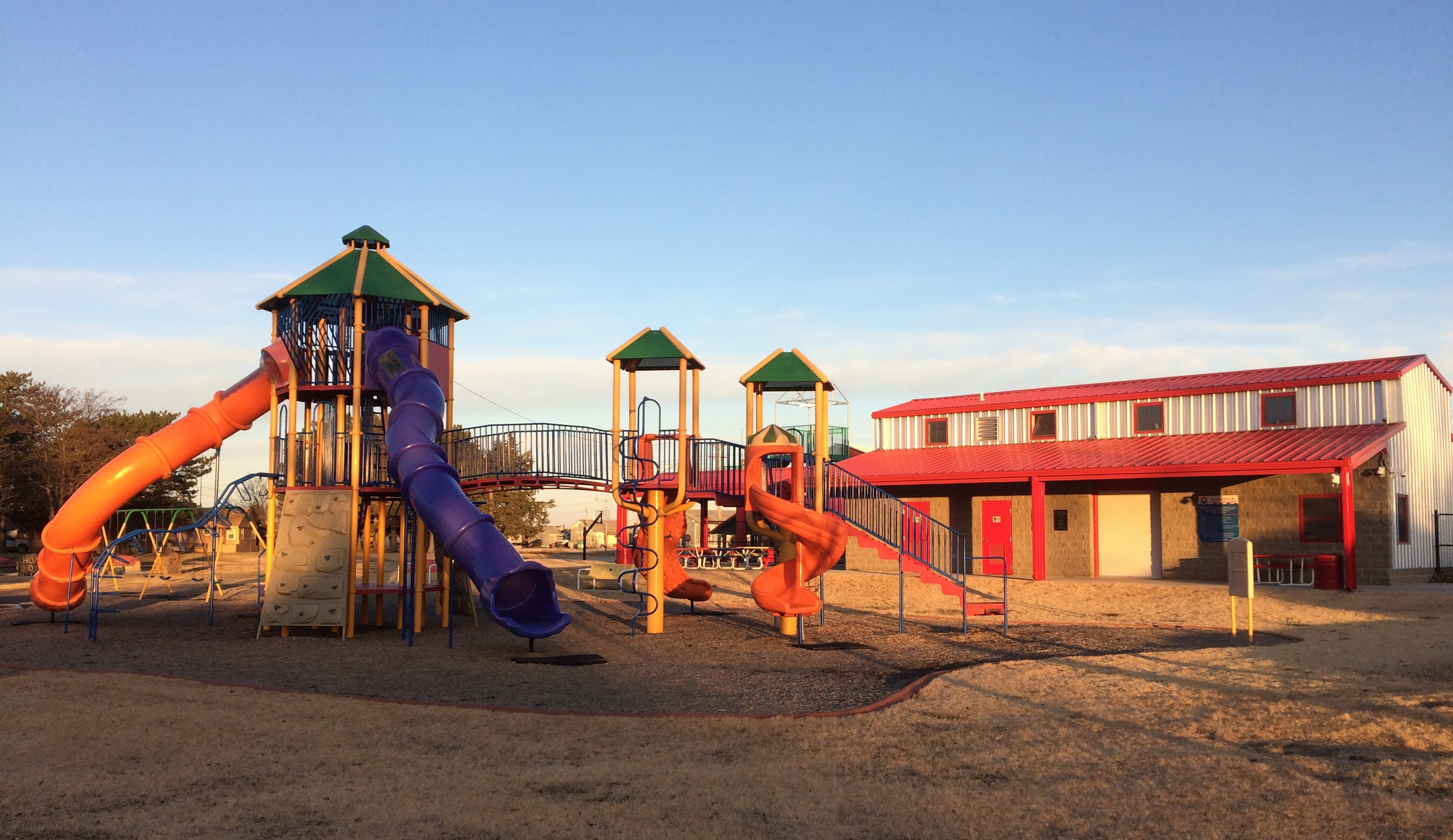
City Park
