= Hamilton Field (Kansas) =

Airport in Derby, Sedgwick County, Kansas

- IATA: none; ICAO: none; FAA LID: 1K3

Summary
- Airport type: Public
- Owner: Hamilton Land Group LLC
- Serves: Derby, Kansas
- Elevation AMSL: 1,320 ft (400 m)
- Coordinates: 37°33′38″N 097°14′01″W
- Interactive map of Hamilton Field

Runways
Direction	Length		Surface
Direction	ft	m	Surface
17/35	2,500	762	Turf

Statistics (2007)
- Aircraft operations: 2,500
- Based aircraft: 30
- Source: Federal Aviation Administration

Hamilton Field (FAA LID: 1K3) was once a public-use airport located two nautical miles (4 km) east of the central business district of Derby, a city in Sedgwick County, Kansas, United States. The airport itself no longer exists, and the land the airport sat on has since been subdivided for residential use. While it was active, Hamilton Field was privately owned by Hamilton Land Group LLC.

== Facilities and aircraft ==
Hamilton Field once covered an area of 30 acres (12 ha) and sat at an elevation of 1,320 feet (402 m) above mean sea level. It had one runway designated 17/35 with a 2,500 x 35 ft (762 x 11 m) turf surface. For the 12-month period ending June 8, 2007, the airport had 2,500 aircraft operations, with an average of 208 operations per month, all of which were categorized as general aviation. At that time there were 30 aircraft based at Hamilton Field. Of these 30, 87% were single-engine aircraft while only 13% were ultralight aircraft.

== Incidents ==
Given the small scale, and turf runway at Hamilton field, the site saw only a small number of aircraft incidents in its operational history. Below is a short list of the most notable:

An Ercoupe 415C landed short of the runway, coming to rest on its back in a wheat field, in 1993. Only two people were on board at the time of the crash and only one minor injury was listed in the NTSB report.

In May 2002 a privately owned 75% scale Fokker DVII crashed at Hamilton Field when winds blew the plane into a stand of trees just after takeoff. While the plane was significantly damaged, the pilot was not injured.
