= El Dorado/Captain Jack Thomas Memorial Airport =

- IATA: EDK; ICAO: KEQA; FAA LID: EQA

Summary
- Airport type: Public
- Owner: City of El Dorado
- Operator: Larry Arnold
- Location: El Dorado, Kansas
- Elevation AMSL: 1,378 ft (420 m)
- Coordinates: 37°46′27″N 096°49′03″W
- Website: www.eldoks.com/El-Dorado-Municipal-Airport
- Interactive map of El Dorado/Captain Jack Thomas Memorial Airport

Runways
Direction	Length		Surface
Direction	ft	m	Surface
4/22	4,204	1,281	Asphalt
15/33	4,200	1,280	Concrete

Statistics
- Aircraft operations (2017): 13,225
- Based aircraft (2018): 42
- Source: Federal Aviation Administration

El Dorado/Captain Jack Thomas Memorial Airport (IATA: EDK, ICAO: KEQA, FAA LID: EQA) is a general aviation public use airport located three miles (5 km) southeast of the central business district of El Dorado, in Butler County, Kansas, United States. This airport is publicly owned by the City of El Dorado.

Although most U.S. airports use the same three-letter location identifier for the FAA and IATA, this airport is assigned EQA by the FAA and EDK by the IATA. The airport's ICAO identifier is KEQA. It is included in the Federal Aviation Administration (FAA) National Plan of Integrated Airport Systems for 2017–2021, in which it is categorized as a local general aviation facility.

== History ==
The El Dorado/Captain Jack Thomas Memorial Airport was named after Captain Wilbur Jackson Thomas, a local hero and World War II ace fighter pilot. Thomas flew with the United States Marine Corp VMF-213 Hellhawks from 1943 to 1947. The City of El Dorado, Kansas claims Thomas as its most famous hometown war hero. He received the Navy Cross and the Distinguished Flying Cross during his tour of duty as a marine aviator in the Pacific Fleet of World War II. He is credited with shooting down 18.5 Japanese planes, sharing a kill with another pilot.

The airport was used as a location for the flying movie The Gypsy Moths. Several homes and businesses from the movie can still be seen today.

== Services ==
El Dorado/Captain Jack Thomas Memorial Airport operates 24 hours a day, 7 days a week, including holidays. The fuel pumps are self-service 24 hours a day, and an attendant is available Monday through Friday from 7 am to 3 pm. The airport carries Jet A with prist, 100LL, and Mogas (91 octane) and is available from pumps in front of the terminal. The airport has two multi-storage hangars and 24 individual T-hangars. There are also tie-downs and a single enclosed transient spot for overnight guests. A courtesy car is available 24 hours a day, and there are several nearby motels. Aircraft rental and flight instruction are available on site from Marsh Flying Services. Also on site is Peterson Performance Plus Inc., manufacturer of Kenai and King Katmai aircraft.

== Facilities and aircraft ==
El Dorado/Captain Jack Thomas Memorial Airport covers an area of 220 acres (89 ha) which contains two intersecting runways:

- Runway 4/22: 4,204 x 75 ft (1,281 x 23 m), surface: asphalt
- Runway 15/33: 4,200 x 75 ft (1,280 x 23 m), surface: concrete

For the 12-month period ending November 2, 2017, the airport had 13,225 aircraft operations, an average of 36 per day: 99% general aviation and <1% military. In July 2018, there are 42 aircraft based at this airport: 41 single-engine and 1 ultralight.

== See also ==
- List of airports in Kansas
