= Benton, Kansas =

City in Butler County, Kansas

- City
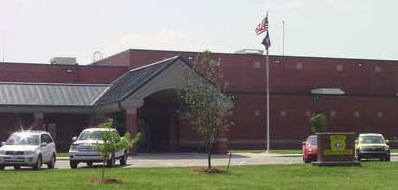
- Circle Middle School (2006)

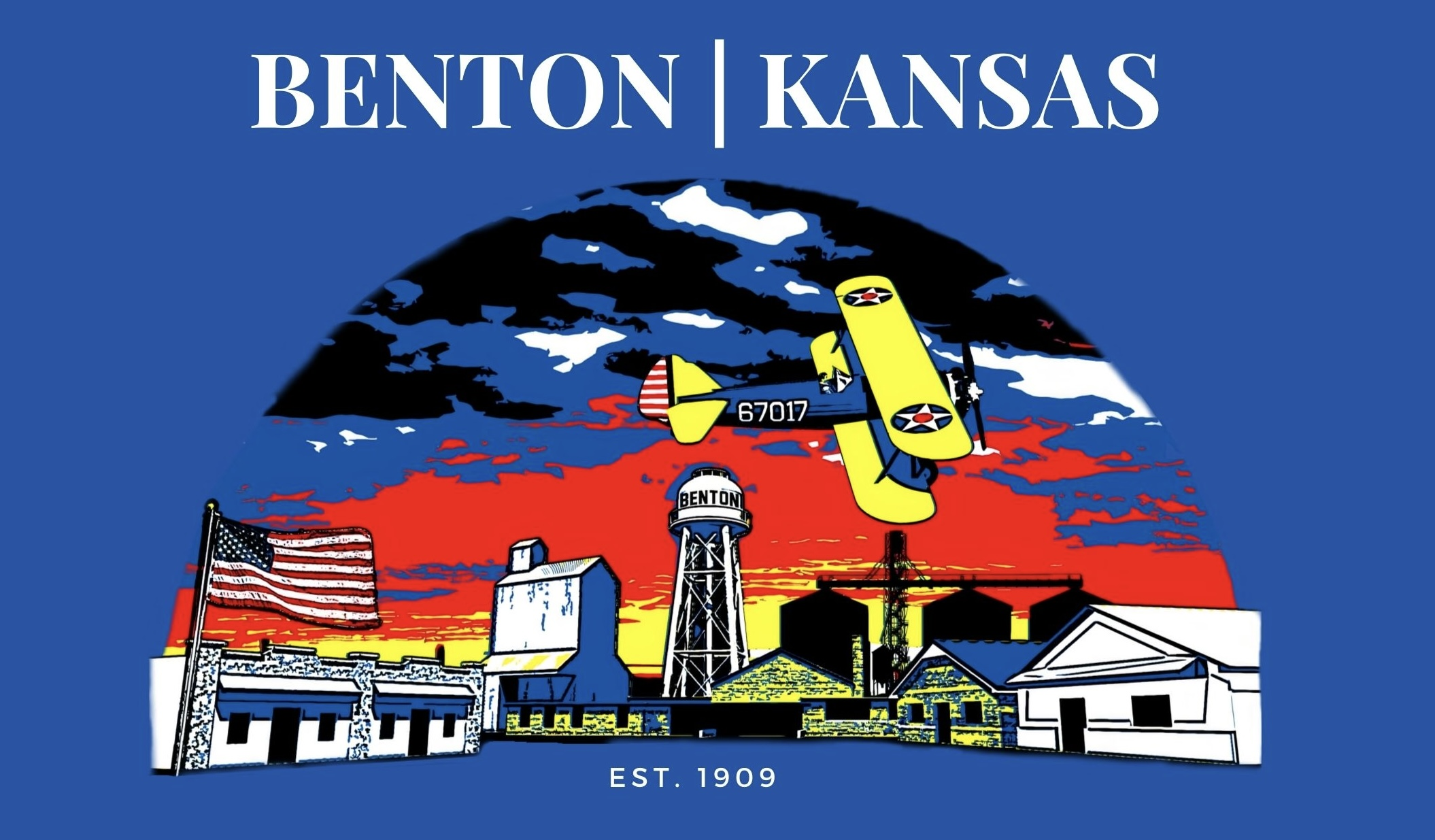
- Flag

- Location within Butler County and Kansas

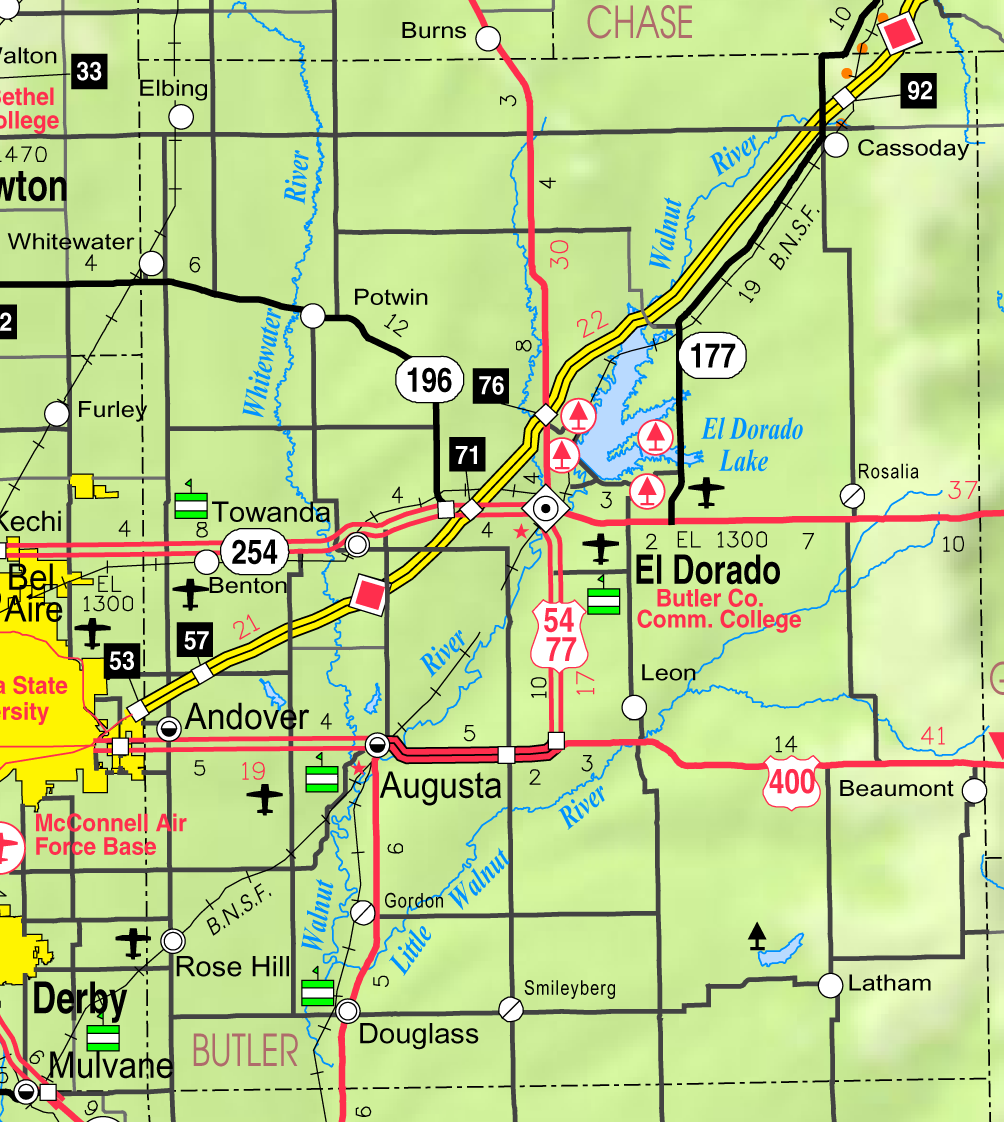
- KDOT map of Butler County (legend)
- Coordinates: 37°47′17″N 97°06′28″W
- Country: United States
- State: Kansas
- County: Butler
- Founded: 1884
- Incorporated: 1909
- Named for: Thomas Benton Murdock

Government
  - Type: Council-Mayor
  - Mayor: Tyler Gottschalk
  - City Manager: Matt Engels

Area
  - Total: 1.40 sq mi (3.62 km^{2})
  - Land: 1.40 sq mi (3.62 km^{2})
  - Water: 0 sq mi (0.00 km^{2})
- Elevation: 1,375 ft (419 m)

Population (2020)
  - Total: 943
  - Density: 675/sq mi (260/km^{2})
- Time zone: UTC-6 (CST)
  - Summer (DST): UTC-5 (CDT)
- ZIP Code: 67017
- Area code: 316
- FIPS code: 20-06175
- GNIS ID: 2394143
- Website: bentonks.org

Benton is a city in Butler County, Kansas, United States. As of the 2020 census, the population of the city was 943. It is located northeast of Wichita along K-254 highway.

== History ==
Benton was founded in 1884. It was named for Thomas Benton Murdock, a state politician. Benton was incorporated as a city in 1908.

In 1969, part of the film The Gypsy Moths was shot in the Benton area.

== Geography ==
According to the United States Census Bureau, the city has a total area of 1.39 square miles (3.60 km^{2}), all land.

== Demographics ==
Historical population
Census	Pop.	Note	%±
1910	240		—
1920	224		−6.7%
1930	253		12.9%
1940	235		−7.1%
1950	269		14.5%
1960	452		68.0%
1970	517		14.4%
1980	609		17.8%
1990	669		9.9%
2000	827		23.6%
2010	880		6.4%
2020	943		7.2%
U.S. Decennial Census

Benton is located in the Wichita, Kansas Metropolitan Statistical Area.

=== 2020 census ===
The 2020 United States census counted 943 people, 375 households, and 266 families in Benton. The population density was 674.5 per square mile (260.4/km^{2}). There were 407 housing units at an average density of 291.1 per square mile (112.4/km^{2}). The racial makeup was 89.18% (841) white or European American (87.59% non-Hispanic white), 1.48% (14) black or African-American, 0.53% (5) Native American or Alaska Native, 0.11% (1) Asian, 0.11% (1) Pacific Islander or Native Hawaiian, 1.27% (12) from other races, and 7.32% (69) from two or more races. Hispanic or Latino of any race was 5.51% (52) of the population.

Of the 375 households, 33.1% had children under the age of 18; 55.7% were married couples living together; 22.9% had a female householder with no spouse or partner present. 24.3% of households consisted of individuals and 9.9% had someone living alone who was 65 years of age or older. The average household size was 2.5 and the average family size was 2.8. The percent of those with a bachelor's degree or higher was estimated to be 26.4% of the population.

26.1% of the population was under the age of 18, 7.4% from 18 to 24, 23.5% from 25 to 44, 28.1% from 45 to 64, and 14.8% who were 65 years of age or older. The median age was 39.5 years. For every 100 females, there were 99.8 males. For every 100 females ages 18 and older, there were 103.2 males.

The 2016–2020 5-year American Community Survey estimates show that the median household income was $79,250 (with a margin of error of +/- $9,249) and the median family income was $87,813 (+/- $26,580). Males had a median income of $58,000 (+/- $10,398) versus $40,938 (+/- $15,312) for females. The median income for those above 16 years old was $50,179 (+/- $6,863). Approximately, 4.3% of families and 3.3% of the population were below the poverty line, including 8.0% of those under the age of 18 and 2.8% of those ages 65 or over.

=== 2010 census ===
As of the census of 2010, there were 880 people, 325 households, and 254 families residing in the city. The population density was 633.1 inhabitants per square mile (244.4/km^{2}). There were 360 housing units at an average density of 259.0 per square mile (100.0/km^{2}). The racial makeup of the city was 97.3% White, 0.1% African American, 0.6% Native American, 0.7% Asian, 0.5% from other races, and 0.9% from two or more races. Hispanic or Latino of any race were 2.7% of the population.

There were 325 households, of which 42.8% had children under the age of 18 living with them, 61.2% were married couples living together, 12.6% had a female householder with no husband present, 4.3% had a male householder with no wife present, and 21.8% were non-families. 18.8% of all households were made up of individuals, and 9.3% had someone living alone who was 65 years of age or older. The average household size was 2.71 and the average family size was 3.08.

The median age in the city was 36 years. 29.1% of residents were under the age of 18; 6.4% were between the ages of 18 and 24; 27.1% were from 25 to 44; 24.2% were from 45 to 64; and 13.3% were 65 years of age or older. The gender makeup of the city was 49.4% male and 50.6% female.

=== 2000 census ===
As of the census of 2000, there were 827 people, 308 households, and 238 families residing in the city. The population density was 1,109.0 inhabitants per square mile (428.2/km^{2}). There were 327 housing units at an average density of 438.5 per square mile (169.3/km^{2}). The racial makeup of the city was 97.46% White, 0.12% African American, 0.24% Native American, 0.24% Asian, 0.48% from other races, and 1.45% from two or more races. Hispanic or Latino of any race were 1.33% of the population.

There were 308 households, out of which 36.0% had children under the age of 18 living with them, 64.9% were married couples living together, 8.8% had a female householder with no husband present, and 22.7% were non-families. 20.1% of all households were made up of individuals, and 8.1% had someone living alone who was 65 years of age or older. The average household size was 2.69 and the average family size was 3.07.

In the city, the population was spread out, with 28.1% under the age of 18, 7.9% from 18 to 24, 28.5% from 25 to 44, 23.3% from 45 to 64, and 12.2% who were 65 years of age or older. The median age was 34 years. For every 100 females, there were 99.8 males. For every 100 females age 18 and over, there were 99.7 males.

The median income for a household in the city was $49,750, and the median income for a family was $58,214. Males had a median income of $40,380 versus $30,179 for females. The per capita income for the city was $21,975. About 3.8% of families and 5.5% of the population were below the poverty line, including 10.5% of those under age 18 and none of those age 65 or over.

== Education ==
The community is served by Circle USD 375 public school district. Benton is home to Circle Benton Elementary and Circle Middle School. The middle school is visible as one drives on the highway past K-254.

Benton High School was closed through school unification. The Benton Tigers won the Kansas State High School class B baseball championship in 1957.

=== Circle Middle School ===
Circle Middle School is the home of the Thunderbirds. The school is a part of the Walnut Valley League (WVL). Students from Circle Benton Elementary, Circle Towanda Elementary, Circle Greenwich Elementary, and Circle Oil Hill Elementary attend this school in their seventh and eighth grades. After graduating, the students move onto Circle High School in Towanda.

Circle Middle School used to be a combination of Circle Benton Elementary and Circle Towanda Elementary, which, at the time, were both K-8 schools. Circle Oil Hill Elementary bused their kids over to Circle Towanda Elementary for classes. When the schools became too crowded due to the influx of jobs in nearby Wichita, El Dorado, and Andover, the school board voted to build a middle school in Benton. The project was completed by Summer 2002. Classes began in the fall. The first 8th grade class to go through the middle school graduated in 2007 from Circle High School.
