= Charles L. Brainard =

American architect

Charles Lewis Brainard
- Born: September 18, 1903; Greeley, Colorado
- Died: June 29, 1988; Abilene, Kansas
- Education: Kansas State University

Charles Lewis Brainard (September 18, 1903 – June 29, 1988) was an American architect, businessman, and teacher who headed efforts to preserve the papers of Dwight D. Eisenhower and create the Eisenhower Presidential Library.

== Information ==
Brainard was born on September 18, 1903, in Greeley, Colorado. He received a bachelor's degree in architecture in 1930 from Kansas State University. Upon graduation, he married and moved to Minnesota. He taught technical drawing at the University of Minnesota, as well as drawing and designing for Pine Beach Development Company. He then returned to Kansas State to earn a Master's degree in architecture in 1937. After graduating, he relocated to Abilene, Kansas, and became the architect (and later an executive) for Duckwall Dime Stores, his father in law Alva Lease Duckwall's business. Additionally, he was on the board of Western Merchandise Company and the United Trust Company, as well as teaching. Brainard was active in the development of the Eisenhower Center. In 1945 he joined the Eisenhower Foundation, a private organization dedicated to developing the Dwight D. Eisenhower memorial. In 1947, the Foundation purchased the Eisenhower's family home in Abilene, and converted it to a museum. The Foundation also conducted a national fundraising campaign to build a museum to hold the military memorabilia of Dwight D. Eisenhower. This eventually became the Eisenhower Museum, dedicated on Veterans Day in 1954. Due to his architectural training Brainard, he served on a committee to improve the grounds surrounding the home and the museum. The memorial was based on a sketch made by Brainard in collaboration with John Wickham.

In 1954, President Eisenhower decided to donate his personal papers to the public provided an archive building could be constructed near the Eisenhower Museum to hold them. In 1955 the state of Kansas created the Eisenhower Presidential Library Commission to develop such an archive. Brainard resigned from the Eisenhower Foundation in order to accept an appointment to the Commission. He served as secretary of the Commission during its entire existence. As Secretary, Brainard handled most of the Commission's duties. The Commission established a separate committee, known as the Kansas Governor's National Committee for the Eisenhower Presidential Library, to handle a national fund-raising drive to pay for the buildings. Brainard oversaw the bids for construction, which he divided into two phases in order to get the archives finished prior to the addition of the memorial. In 1971 and later years, Brainard donated approximately 3,700 pages of Eisenhower documents to the library. Brainard also was a trustee for the Kansas State College Endowment association.

== Personal life ==
He married Donna Duckwall in 1930. They had one daughter. He died on June 29, 1988, in Abilene.
