= Leavenworth Plaza =

Indoor shopping center in Kansas, U.S.

- Location: Leavenworth, Kansas, United States
- Coordinates: 39.30174°N 94.90784°W
- Address: 3400 S. 4th Street
- Opened: 1967
- Closed: 2013 (interior mall area)
- Demolished: 2015 (interior mall demolition began)
- Num. of anchor tenants: 3 (at opening)
- The former mall site is identified by the City of Leavenworth as the former Leavenworth Plaza Mall site at 3400 S. 4th Street.

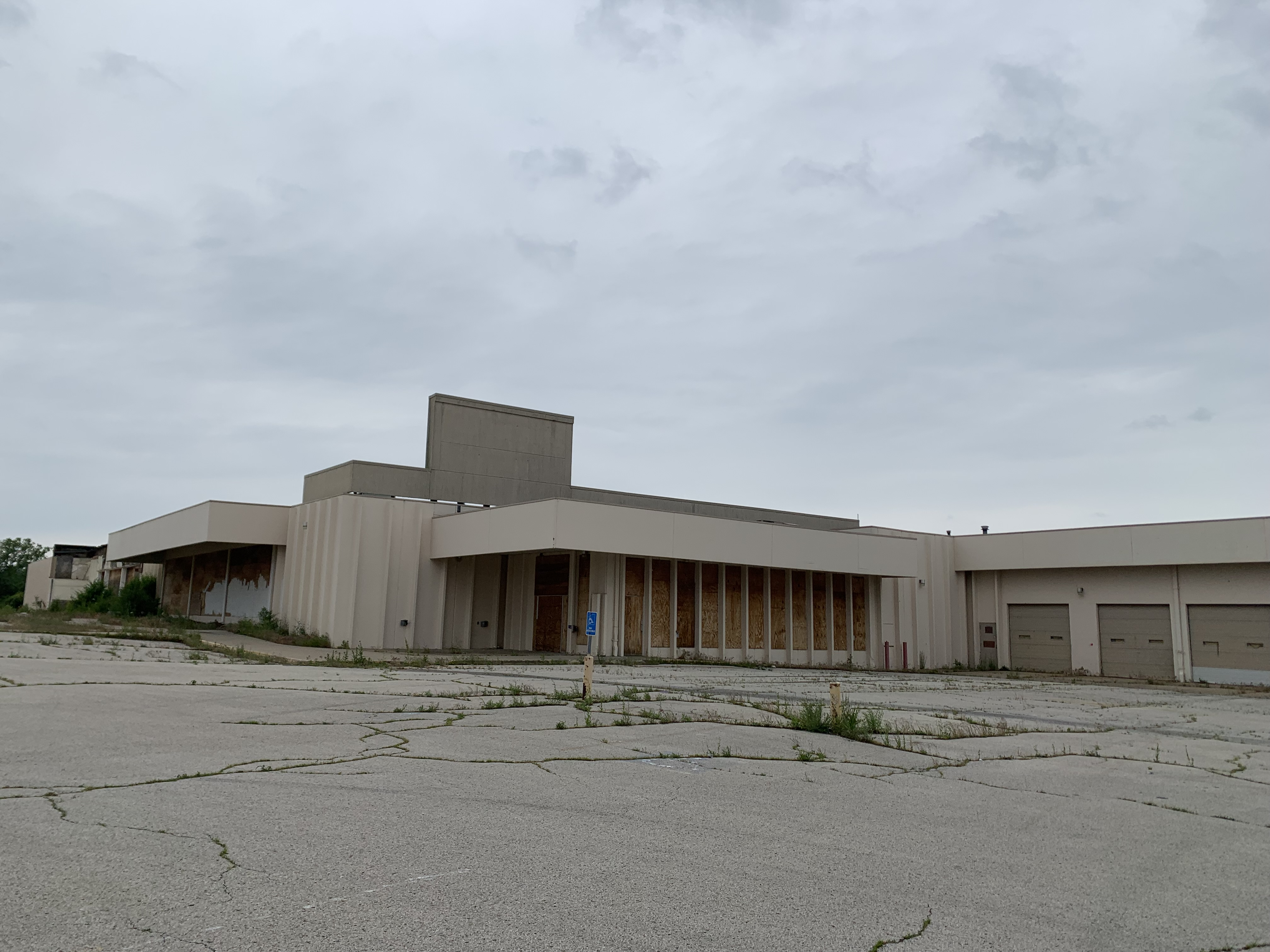
Part of Leavenworth Plaza still standing in 2025

Leavenworth Plaza was an indoor shopping center in Leavenworth, Kansas. Originally opened in 1967, the mall was anchored by J.C. Penney, Montgomery Ward, and Safeway. Duckwall-ALCO Retail Stores added a store in 1972.

Montgomery Ward became Sears in 1987. A movie theater was added in 1993 after Duckwall-ALCO closed. J.C. Penney closed in 2003, and Sears later closed as well. The mall's original owners, Copaken, White & Blitt, sold it to Colliers Turley Martin Tucker in 2008. The property is currently managed by Dial Properties

The movie theater closed in 2010. Westlake Ace Hardware still operates in a portion of the building. By 2013, the remaining tenants were Ace Hardware, GNC, Curves, RadioShack, and Cato Corporation, with the indoor area closed. Demolition of the interior mall began in November 2015. As of 2025, only Ace Hardware remains active on the site.
