= Mid-Continent Airport =

Mid-Continent Airport may refer to:

- Wichita Dwight D. Eisenhower National Airport (IATA: ICT), formerly known as Wichita Mid-Continent Airport, in Wichita, Kansas
- Kansas City International Airport (IATA: MCI) in Kansas City, Missouri
