= TSCO =

TSCO may refer to:

- Tesco (LSE: TSCO), British retail chain
- Tractor Supply Company (Nasdaq: TSCO), American retail chain
- TSCO Racing, a builder of trophy trucks
