= Bomgaars =

American farm/ranch supply store

Bomgaars Supply Inc.

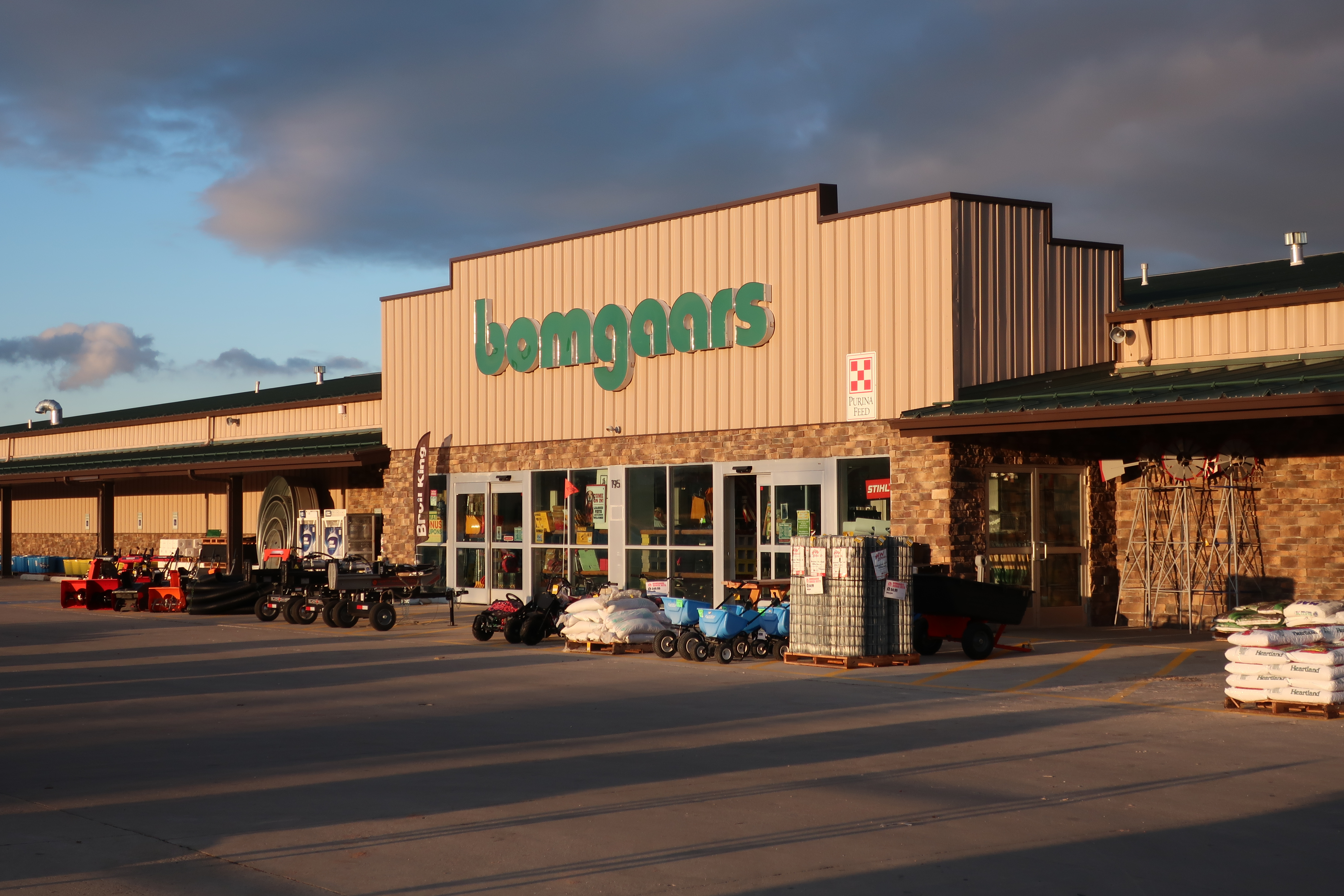
- Bomgaars store number 66 in Gillette, Wyoming
- Type: Private
- Industry: Retail
- Founded: 1944; 82 years ago, in Middleburg, Iowa, U.S.
- Founder: William Bomgaars
- Headquarters: Sioux City, Iowa, U.S.
- Number of locations: 180
- Area served: Iowa, Minnesota, Nebraska, Oklahoma, South Dakota, Wyoming, Colorado, Kansas, Kentucky, and Idaho
- Key people: Torrey Wingert (CEO)
- Products: Farm and ranch supplies
- Revenue: US$750 million (2022)
- Number of employees: 5,000 (2023)
- Website: bomgaars.com

Bomgaars Supply Inc. (doing business as Bomgaars and stylized as bomgaars) is a retail chain of farm and ranch supply stores headquartered in Sioux City, Iowa. Bomgaars serves the Midwest, High Plains, and Rockies with stores in Iowa, Minnesota, Nebraska, Oklahoma, South Dakota, Wyoming, Colorado, Kansas, Kentucky, Idaho, Ohio, Indiana, Missouri, Arkansas, and Texas. It is operated by the Bomgaars family.

== History ==
Founder William Bomgaars got his start in Middleburg, Iowa, at the age of 18, operating a general store, selling gingham from the bolt, and crackers from a barrel. Also from this store, he stocked horse-drawn wagons with all the needs of the rural family and drove them on a farm route. From this beginning, after various positions, including selling violin lessons in Chicago, and washing machines in South Dakota, Bill decided to venture out on his own. In 1931, in Sioux City, he borrowed $125.00 on his Army insurance to purchase a Ford Model A, and Mr. Bob Bowes, of Bowes Seal Fast, extended time credit for a beginning inventory of $125.00. Bill loaded his merchandise into the car and started out to build up a territory. By 1932, the midwest was deep in depression and growth was very slow. However, by 1934 he was eating 3 meals a day on a regular schedule. Before this, he had been on an inventive program that let him eat breakfast, lunch or dinner, as the case may be, as soon as he made his first sale of the day.

In January 1944, the operation had expanded to the point where it could no longer be contained in their home, and was moved to the first downtown location at 819 Pearl Street, in Sioux City, Iowa. At this time the work force consisted of two extra employees, Bill's sister, Ann, in the office, and his brother, Gerald, as a salesman on the road.

In 1944 Sioux City sustained extensive damage from a major flood on the west side and the building had to be sand-bagged. The next move was to the building at 611 Pearl Street in 1945. The business consisted mainly of tire and repair materials. By 1946, Bomgaars became the jobber for NAPA Auto Parts and had two secretaries and four salespeople traveling through the territory.

Bill's son Harold Bomgaars graduated from the University of Iowa in 1947 and entered the business on a full-time basis as a traveling salesman.

In July, 1952, Bill heard of an innovation in Grand Forks, North Dakota, that caught his attention: the sending of fleet cards to farmers entitling them to discounts. Manufacturers at that time were selling at a discount to businesses on a fleet basis; that is, any business operating five or more fuel powered vehicles and/or equipment, were qualified to buy at a discount. Bill's wife, Tena, and Bill's sister-in-law compiled the lists of people operating 5 or more vehicles from the tax roles in the county seats. It was in Milbank, South Dakota, in 1952, that four men, including Bill Bomgaars, instituted the Mid-States buying group and Bomgaars went into the farm fleet business. Many new lines were added and this resulted in the beginning of more rapid growth, necessitating a move to larger quarters at 204 Fourth Street in 1955.

Expansion began taking place in the form of opening branch stores, and the first one was in Yankton, South Dakota, in 1956. By 2001, the company had 15 stores; it nearly doubled the chain's size by acquiring 13 former Country General stores after that chain's owner filed for bankruptcy. In 2012 Bomgaars acquired five Shoppers Supply stores in Iowa. In 2015, Bomgaars took over 12 former locations of the defunct ALCO Stores chain. In 2019, Bomgaars took over 13 former locations of the bankrupt Shopko discount chain; seven of the sites are for relocations of existing stores, while six are stores in new markets.

In October 2022, Bomgaars acquired 73 Orscheln Farm & Home stores as part of a deal to complete Tractor Supply Company's purchase of Orscheln. Bomgaars also acquired the Orscheln distribution center in Moberly, Missouri.

Bomgaars operates distribution centers in Sioux City, Iowa, and in Gering, Nebraska.
