= Orscheln Farm & Home =

American retail chain

- Company type: Privately held family business (1960–2022); Subsidiary (2022–present)
- Industry: Retail
- Founded: 1960 (66 years ago) in Sedalia, Missouri, U.S.
- Founders: W.C. Orscheln
- Headquarters: Moberly, Missouri, U.S.
- Number of locations: 175 (2021)
- Area served: 11 U.S. states
- Key people: Robert Orscheln (CEO)
- Products: Automotive parts and accessories, apparel, farm and ranch supplies, hardware, housewares, hunting equipment, lawn and garden supplies, pet and livestock supplies, tools
- Revenue: $949 million (2013)
- Owner: Orscheln Group
- Number of employees: 3,500 (2021)
- Parent: Tractor Supply Company (2022–present)
- Website: http://www.orschelnfarmhome.com

Orscheln Farm & Home was an American retail chain of farm and ranch supply stores headquartered in Moberly, Missouri. Orscheln had 175 stores located in Arkansas, Illinois, Indiana, Iowa, Kansas, Kentucky, Missouri, Nebraska, Oklahoma, Ohio. In May 2018, the company opened its 175th location. It is part of the Orscheln Group, a conglomerate of companies operated by the Orscheln family. Tractor Supply Company acquired Orscheln Farm & Home in 2022, divesting approximately half of the stores to other owners to complete the acquisition.

== History ==
W.C. Orscheln opened the first Orscheln Farm & Home store in Sedalia, Missouri, in 1960. Jerry Orscheln took over the business in the mid-1960s.

The company operates a distribution center in Moberly, Missouri. In January 2015, it acquired a distribution center in Abilene, Kansas, formerly used by the defunct ALCO Stores retail chain. Company president Stephen Chick said the acquisition of the Abilene distribution center means the company is "poised to double the number of Orscheln Farm and Home retail stores as we continue our growth and expansion."

In February 2021, Tractor Supply Company announced that it would acquire Orscheln for $297 million. The deal was completed in October 2022; in order to mitigate federal anti-trust concerns, Tractor Supply sold 73 Orscheln stores and the Orscheln distribution center in Moberly, Missouri, to Bomgaars, and 12 stores were sold to Missouri-based farm store chain Buchheit.
