= Dwight D. Eisenhower Presidential Library, Museum and Boyhood Home =

Presidential library and museum in Abilene, Kansas, U.S.

Dwight Eisenhower Presidential Library, Museum and Boyhood Home

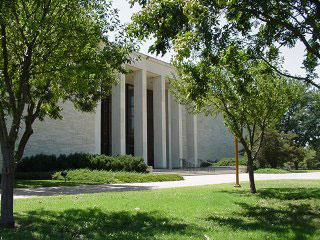
- The Eisenhower Library in 2008

- Location within Kansas Location within the United States
- Interactive map showing the location of Eisenhower Library

General information
- Location: Abilene, Kansas, U.S.
- Coordinates: 38°54′44″N 97°12′39″W
- Named for: Dwight D. Eisenhower
- Operator: NARA

Technical details
- Size: 22 acres (8.9 ha)

Website
- eisenhowerlibrary.gov

The Dwight D. Eisenhower Presidential Library, Museum and Boyhood Home is the presidential library and museum of Dwight David Eisenhower, the 34th president of the United States (1953–1961), located in his hometown of Abilene, Kansas. The museum includes Eisenhower's boyhood home, where he lived from 1898 until being appointed to West Point in 1911, and is also the president's final resting place. It is one of the thirteen presidential libraries under the auspices of the National Archives and Records Administration (NARA). The library contains approximately 335,000 photographs, 768,000 video recordings, 400 million documents, and 1,291 audio recordings related to Eisenhower's presidency.

== History ==
The Eisenhower Presidential complex is only one of two whose creation preceded the close of a presidency, and while this is obviously the case with his boyhood home, construction of the library itself began in 1958, and the museum portion before he even took office, coinciding with the then-General's announcement of his presidential candidacy in June 1952.

=== Eisenhower Foundation ===
As World War II came to an end, local admirers of the Supreme Commander of Allied forces in Europe, such as Charles L. Brainard, decided to honor Eisenhower with a museum. In 1945, a non-profit foundation in his name was created to purchase his boyhood home and build the museum on the same property. It was to house artifacts from veterans, and the honors of Eisenhower in particular. At the time, the General's mother Ida was still alive and refused to sell the property. When she died in 1946, another purchase attempt was made. However, the fund-raising tactics of the foundation offended Eisenhower, and this almost scuttled the project. New fundraising rules were established for the Foundation after its discussion with Ike's youngest brother Milton, and agreement by all the Eisenhower brothers. They ultimately donated the house to the Foundation, and the entire site, in south Abilene, later became the Eisenhower Presidential Center.

=== Construction of the museum ===
Mrs. Eisenhower's home opened to the public as a museum on June 22, 1947. and the cornerstone of an Eisenhower/World War II museum was laid in June 1952 by the General himself, just before he accepted the draft and formally announced his candidacy for president.

The museum was completed in 1954, and the President was in attendance when it was formally opened on November 11 of that year. He was impressed by the results, and told the leadership of the foundation that if they could raise the money to build a facility, he would donate his papers and other materials to it.

A fundraising campaign launched in 2015 seeks to refresh and expand the museum's exhibits in 2018. If plans remain the same, the museum would be closed for about a year while the remainder of the site would remain open as usual.

=== Construction and dedication of the library ===
With the fundraising constraints on the foundation still in place in 1954, the Kansas Legislature took up the slack, authorizing a separate "Eisenhower Presidential Library Commission," and over the next five years enough money was raised to begin construction. Again, President Eisenhower was present when ground was broken on October 13, 1959. The project took three years to complete, and Vice President Lyndon B. Johnson joined the retired President Eisenhower at the dedication on May 1, 1962.

Operation of the site was turned over to the NARA in 1966, when it became the fourth library in the system.

== Campus ==
The campus has five buildings:

- The Library
- The Museum, restored and rededicated in 1971.
- Visitors Center, containing a gift shop and theater where a short film on the President is shown several times daily.
- Boyhood Home
- A chapel, known as "The Place of Meditation;" the final resting place of the president, the First Lady, and their first-born son, Doud Eisenhower.

Also on the site:

- A statue of General Eisenhower by Robert L. Dean Jr., presented to the campus by the Harry and Edith Darby Foundation.
- Five pylons inscribed with phrases commemorating Eisenhower's life from birth through the Presidency.

== Gallery ==
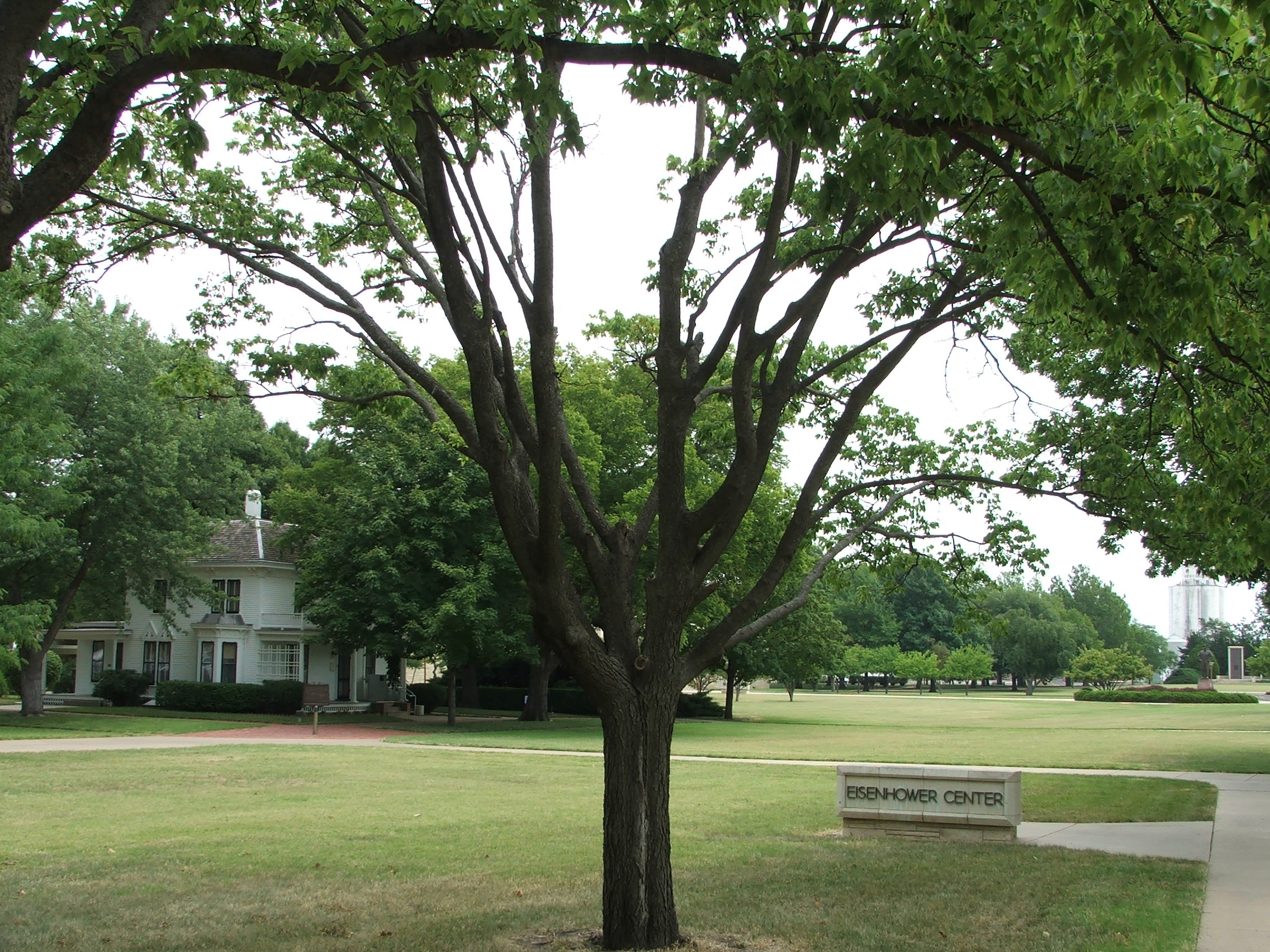
Grounds as seen from approach to place of meditation

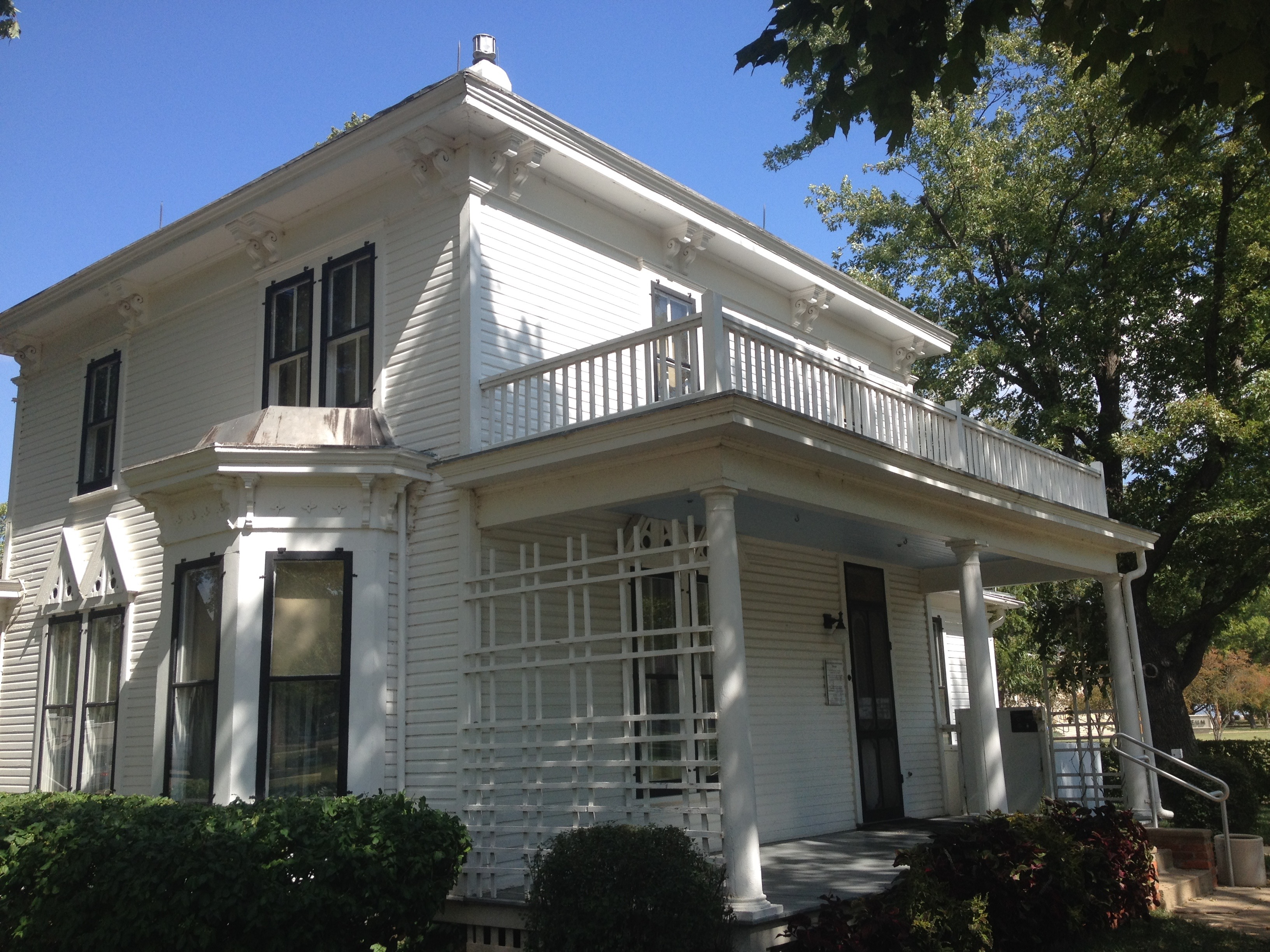
Front of Eisenhower boyhood home, southwest corner

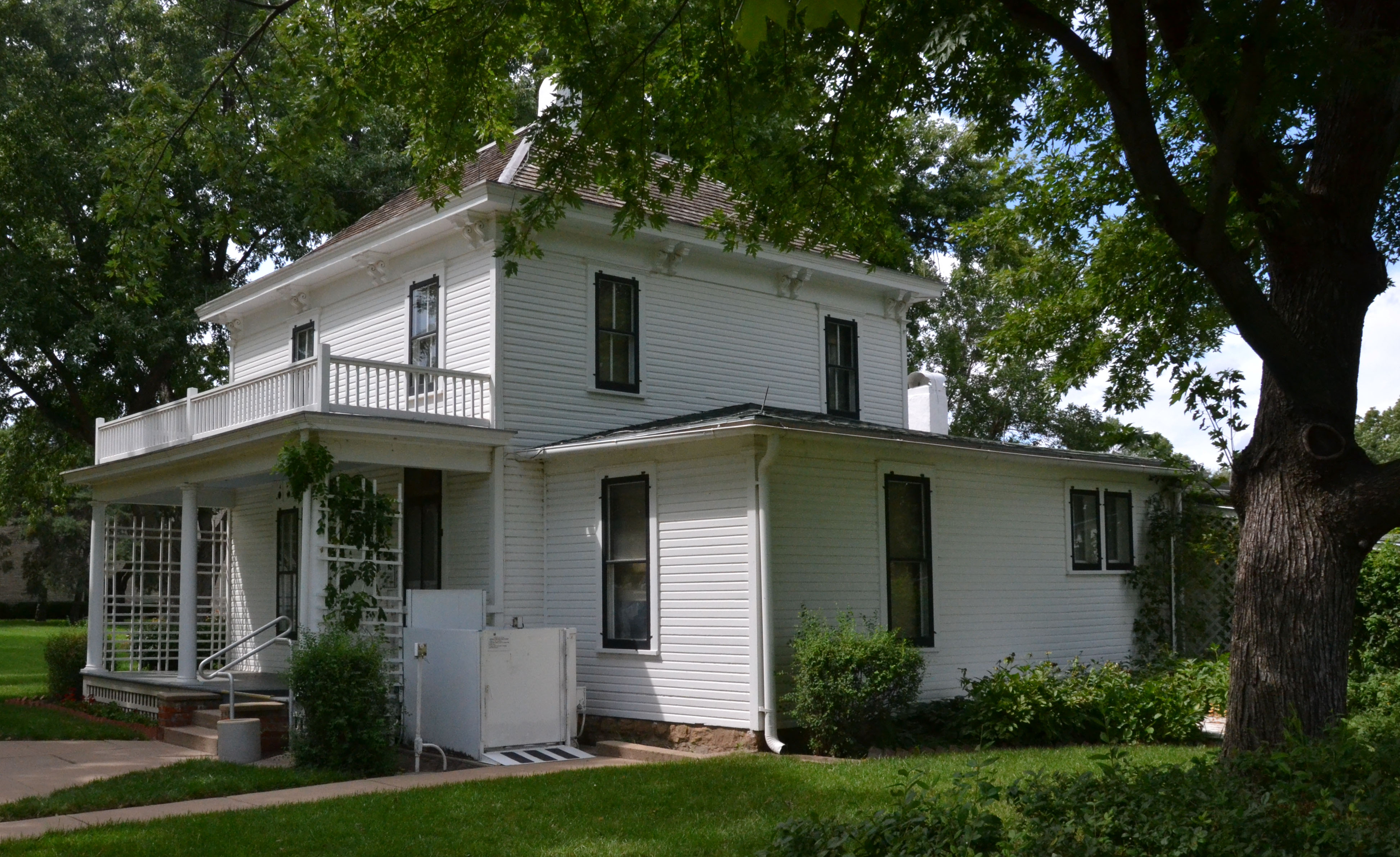
Southeast corner of boyhood home

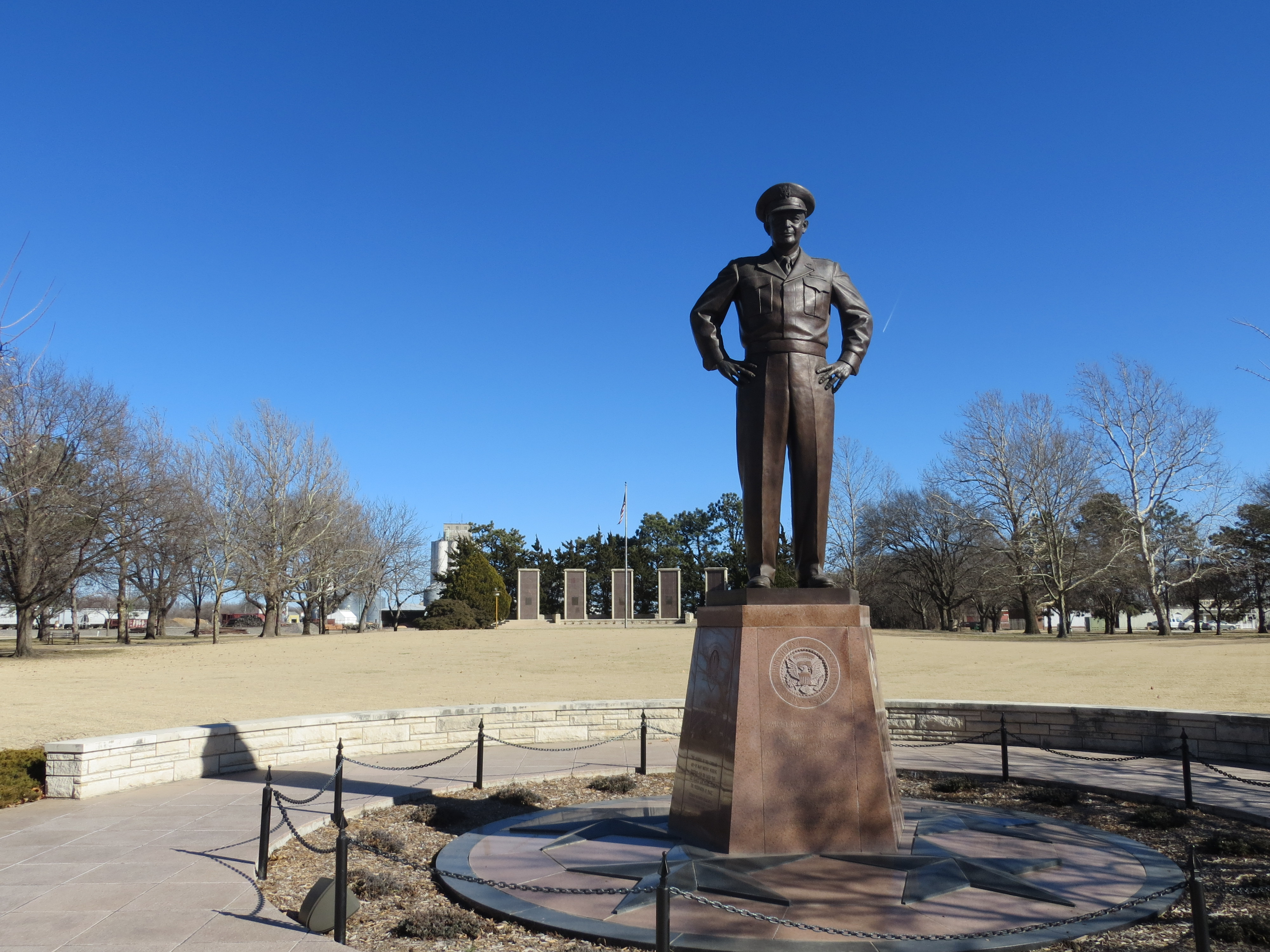
Eisenhower statue in "Champion of Peace" circle, with memorial pylons in background

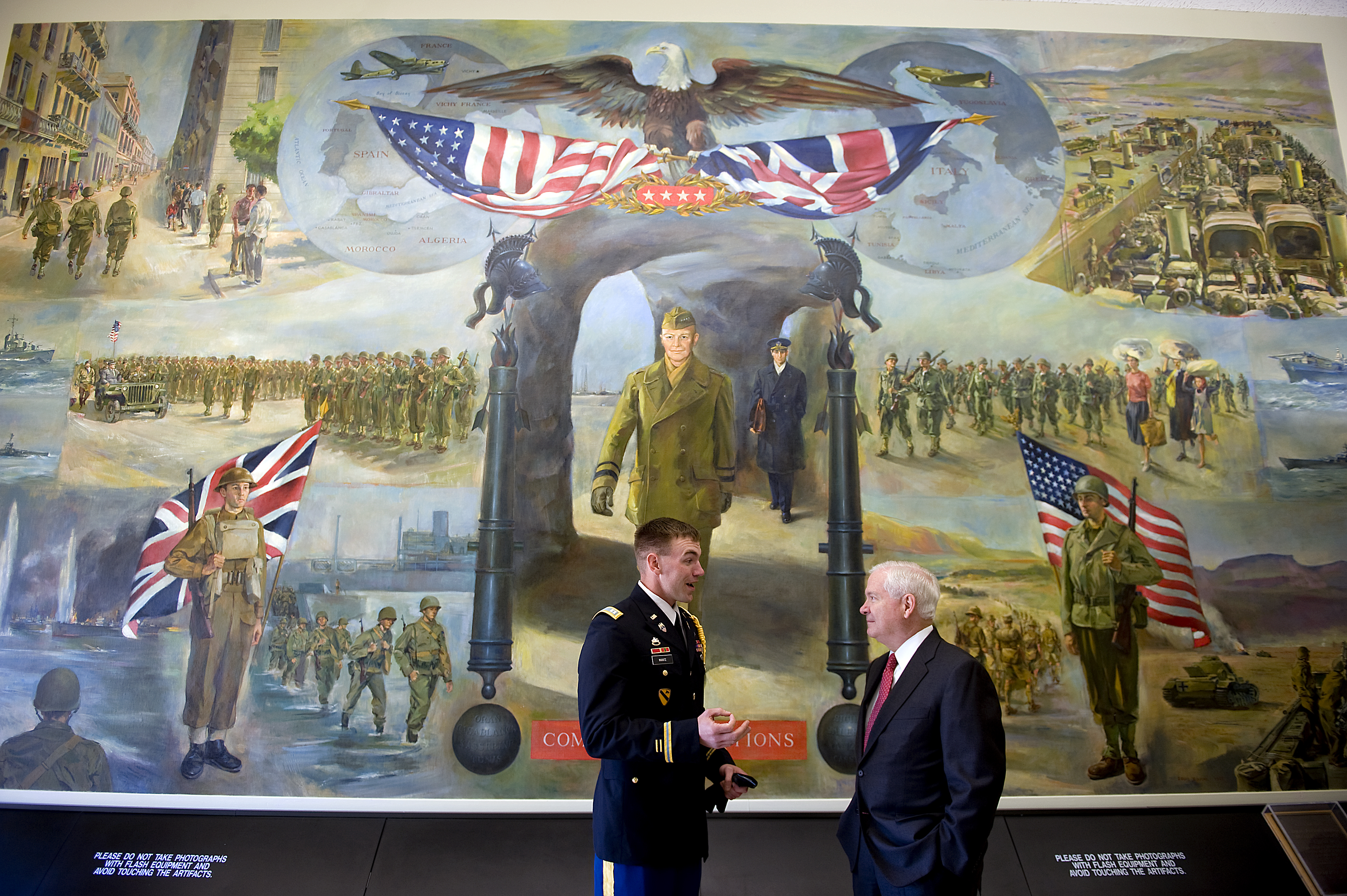
Inside Museum lobby; Defense Secretary Robert Gates and Army Capt. Josh Mantz, 2010

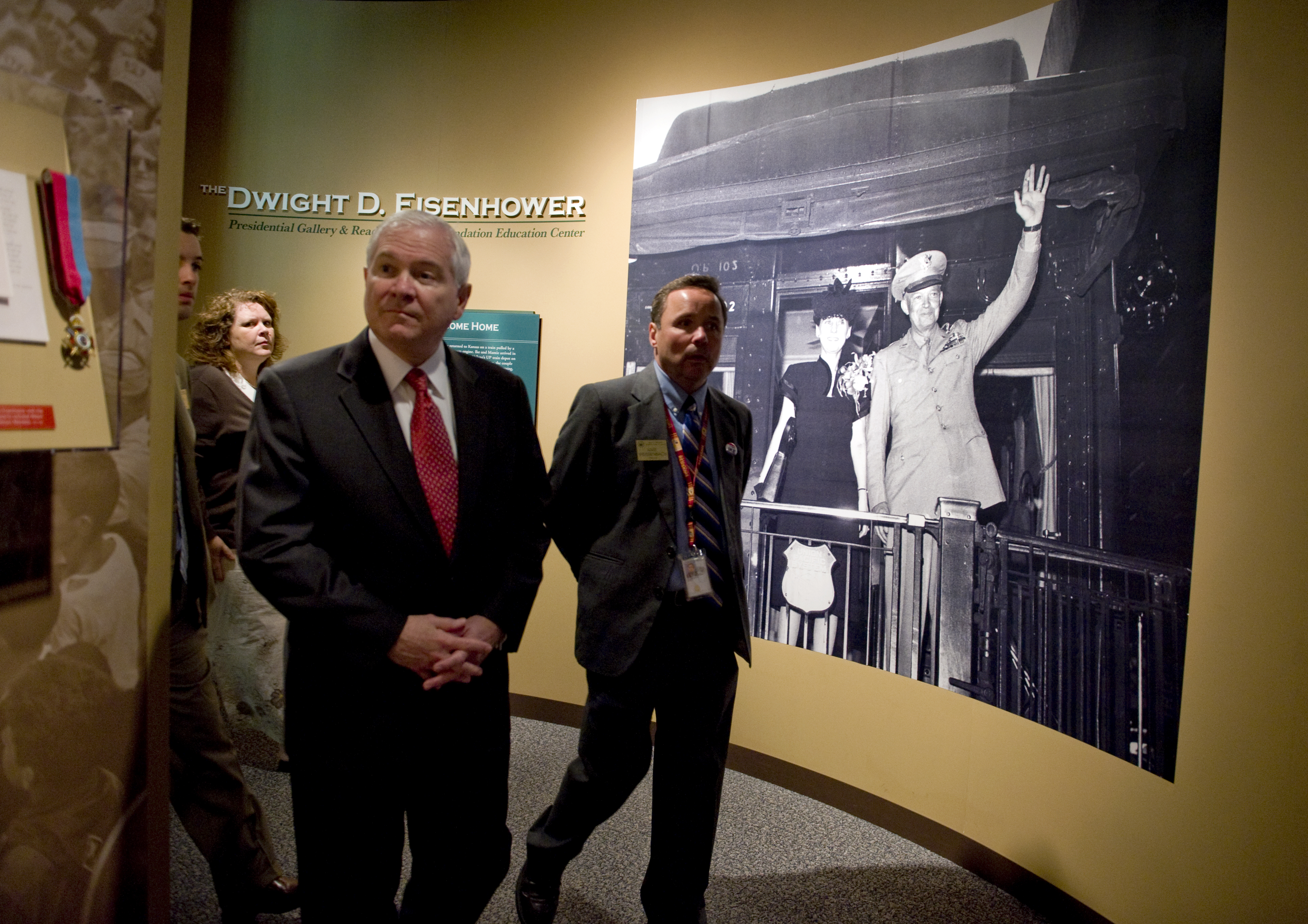
Museum tour; Secretary Gates and Museum Director Karl Weissenbach, 2010

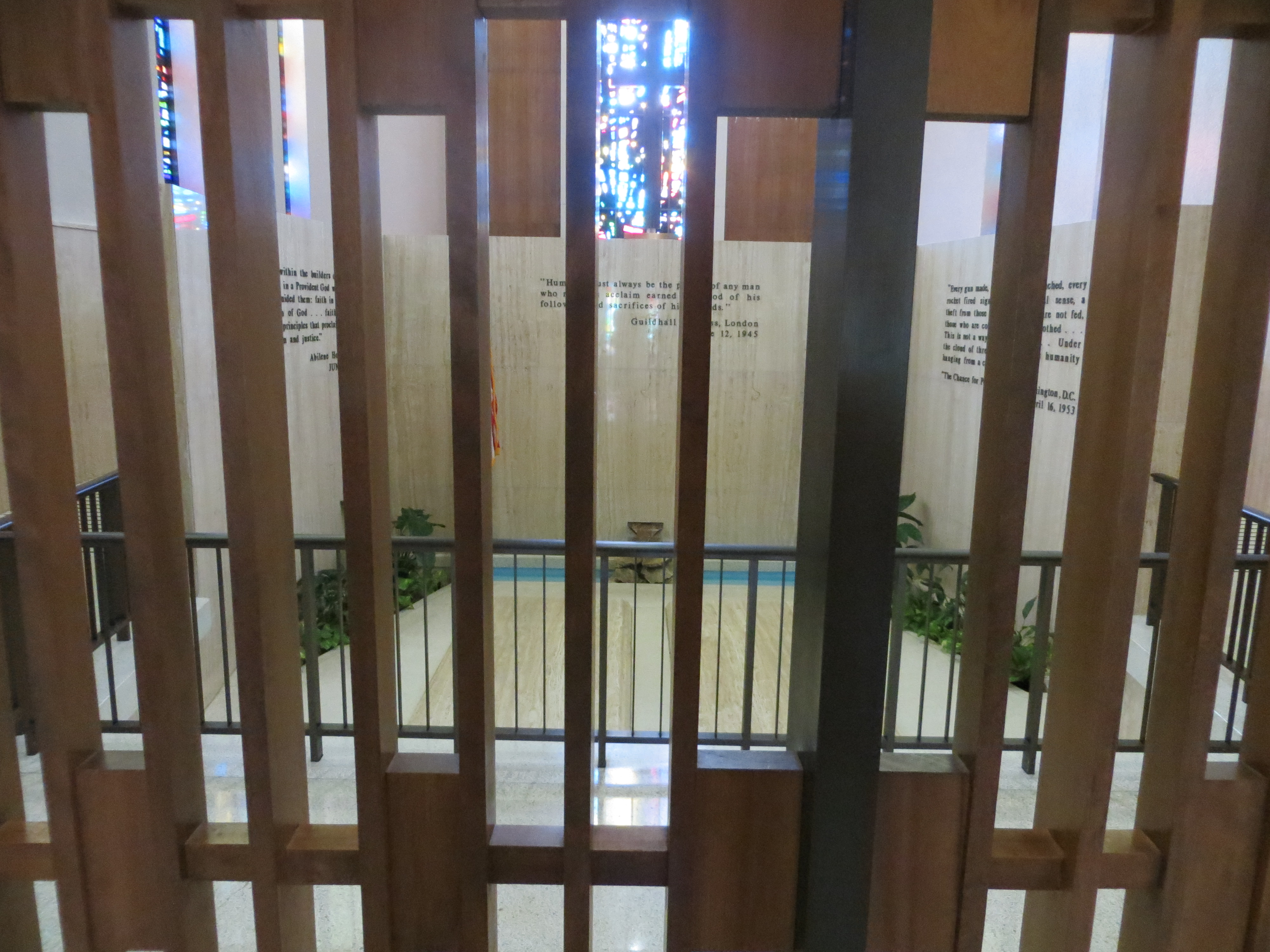
View from entry corridor of "Place of Meditation"

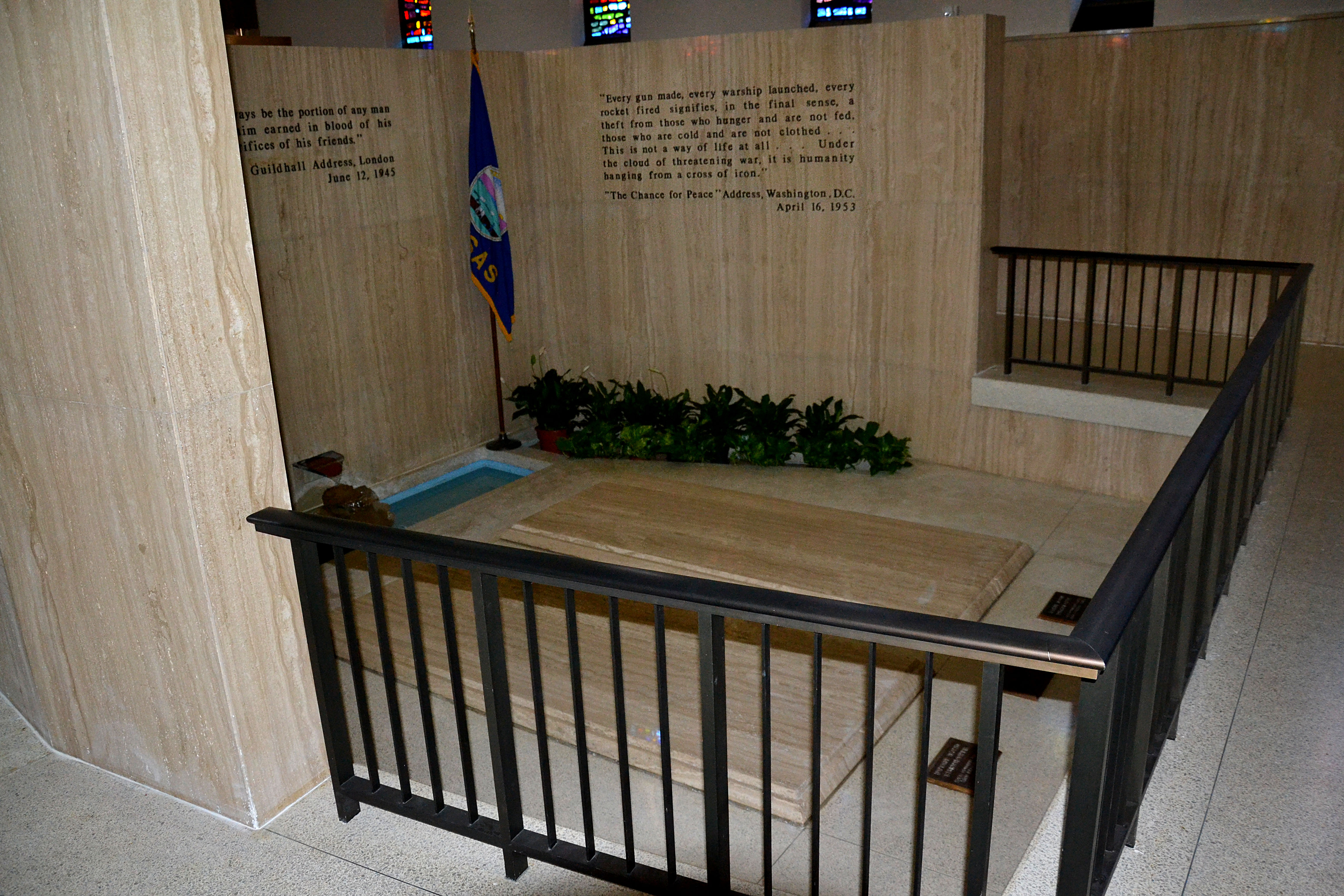
Graves of Dwight D. Eisenhower, Doud Dwight Eisenhower and Mamie Eisenhower

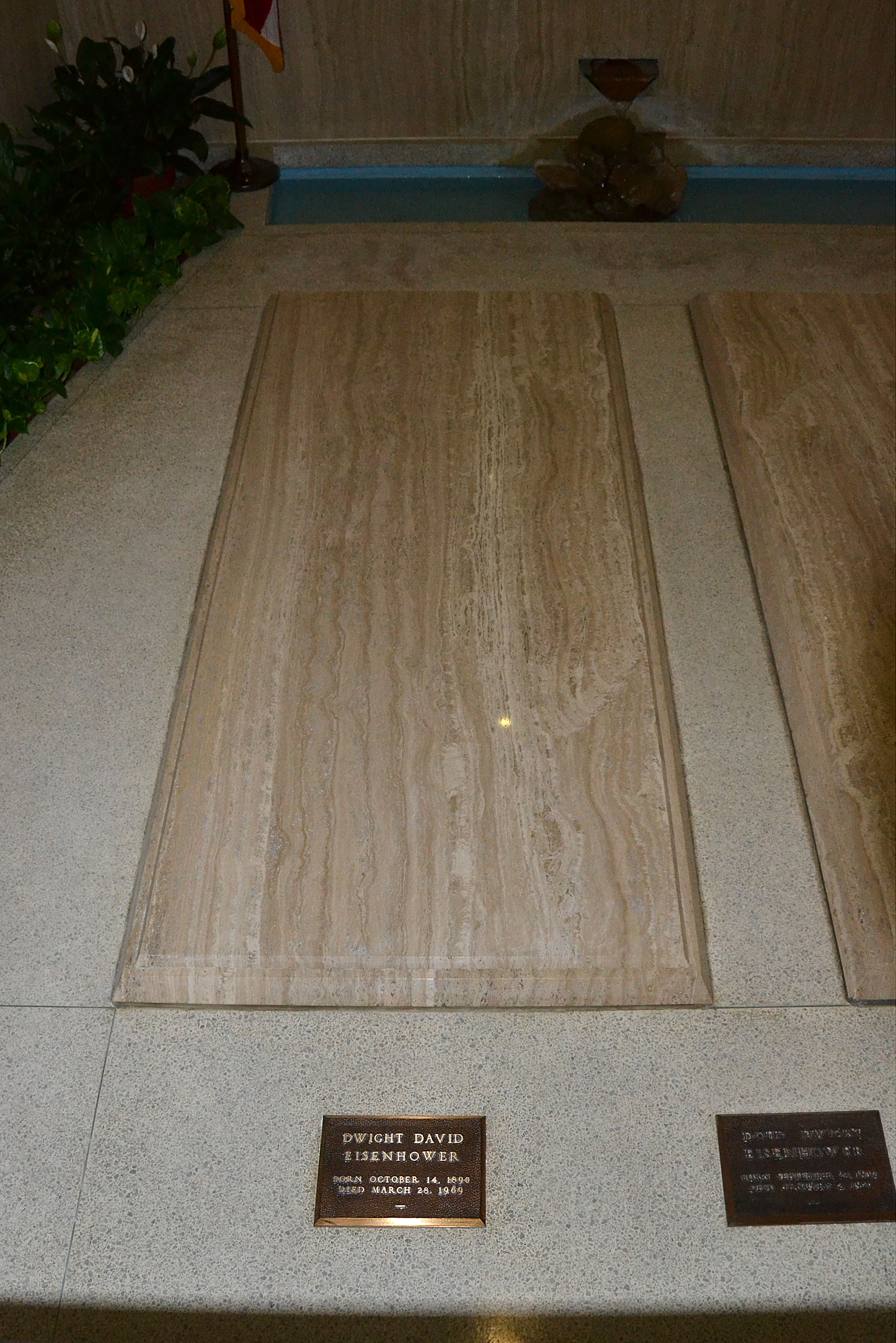
Grave of Dwight D. Eisenhower

== See also ==
- Wichita Dwight D. Eisenhower National Airport
- Presidential memorials in the United States
- List of residences of presidents of the United States
- List of burial places of presidents and vice presidents of the United States
