= 2014 Wichita King Air crash =

Aviation disaster in Kansas, US

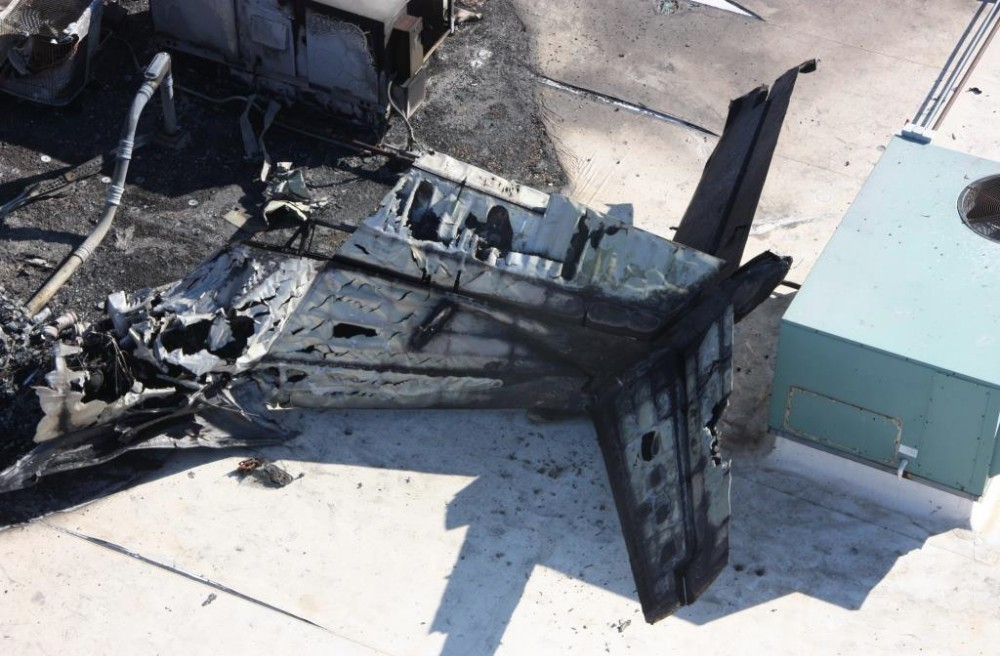
- Crash site

Accident
- Date: October 30, 2014
- Summary: Crashed into a building following suspected engine failure at take-off; pilot error
- Site: Wichita Mid-Continent Airport, Wichita, Kansas, United States; 37°39.592′N 97°25.490′W
- Total fatalities: 4
- Total injuries: 6

Aircraft
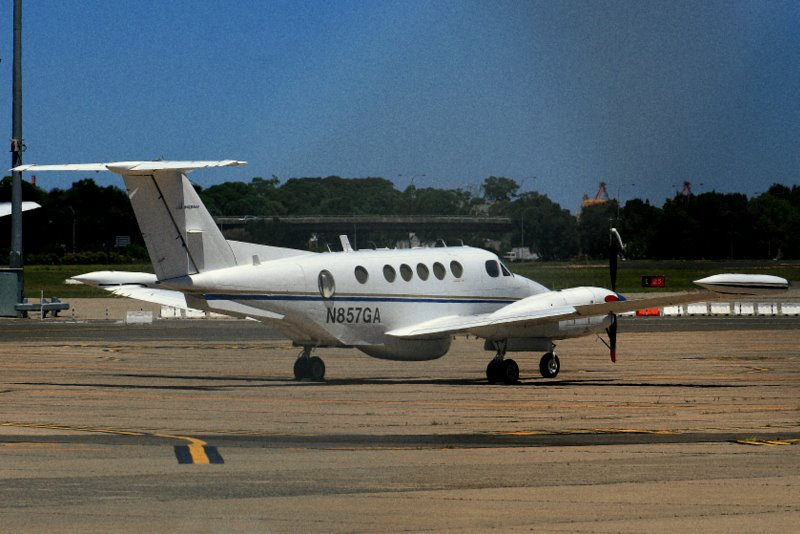
- A Beechcraft King Air similar to the accident aircraft
- Aircraft type: Beechcraft King Air B200
- Operator: Gilleland Aviation
- Registration: N52SZ
- Flight origin: Wichita Mid-Continent Airport, Wichita, Kansas
- Destination: Mena Intermountain Municipal Airport, Mena, Arkansas
- Occupants: 1
- Passengers: 0
- Crew: 1
- Fatalities: 1
- Survivors: 0

Ground casualties
- Ground fatalities: 3
- Ground injuries: 6

On October 30, 2014, a Beechcraft King Air B200 twin turboprop crashed into a building hosting a FlightSafety International (FSI) training center, shortly after taking off from Wichita Mid-Continent Airport in Wichita, Kansas. The pilot, the only person on board, was killed along with three people in the building; six more people in the building were injured.

The National Transportation Safety Board (NTSB) concluded that the crash most likely occurred due to the pilot's inability to successfully control the aircraft after a reduction in power from the left engine.

== Accident ==
The aircraft was operating a non-scheduled repositioning flight to Mena, Arkansas. At 9:47 a.m., the flight was cleared by the control tower to fly the runway heading and climb to 5,000 feet altitude. Shortly thereafter, the takeoff roll began from runway 1R. Seconds after liftoff, the pilot reported "...and Tower, just declaring an emergency, ah, we just lost, loss the left engine". The aircraft made several oscillations in altitude then began a turn to the left, climbing slowly. The Beechcraft continued turning left, missing the top of a hangar on the west side of the runway with marginal clearance.

At 9:48, with the landing gear extended and in a 29-degree slip left, the aircraft impacted the northeast corner of the FSI building at 92 knots while descending at 1,600 feet per minute, killing the pilot and three people in the building. The flight duration from lift off to impact was 26 seconds, with the aircraft reaching a maximum altitude of approximately 120 feet above ground level (AGL).

The three people killed in the building were trapped inside one of several flight simulators installed at the facility. The impact and fire destroyed most of the aircraft and the FSI building sustained fire and structural damage.

== Aircraft and crew ==
The King Air B200, serial number BB-1686, was manufactured in 2000 and was powered by two Pratt & Whitney PT6A-42 turboprop engines turning four bladed Hartzell constant-speed propellers. The aircraft was owned and operated by Gilleland Aviation Inc., who had purchased it two days prior to the accident flight. On October 22, 2014, major scheduled maintenance was completed, including internal inspections of both engines. The Beechcraft logged 1.4 hours flight time and two takeoff/landing cycles since this maintenance. Total airframe hours was 6,314 with 7,257 cycles at the time of the crash.

The pilot and sole occupant of the aircraft was 53-year-old Mark Goldstein, a retired Air Traffic Controller from Wichita who held a valid Federal Aviation Administration (FAA) second-class medical certificate. Investigators determined he had at least 3,139 total flight hours, of which 2,843 were in multiengine airplanes.

== Investigation ==
Inspection of the aircraft systems, engines and propellers found no irregularities that could have prevented normal operation. In-depth scrutiny of the propellers, combined with a sound spectrum analysis, led investigators to conclude that the left engine was probably generating low to moderate power and the right engine was at a moderate to high power setting, at the time of impact. Other evidence, including video taken by cameras around the airport, suggested that considerable left rudder input was applied by the pilot shortly before the crash. Correct reaction to a reduction in power from the left engine would have been right rudder input.

Examination of the CVR revealed it had survived the crash with usable data intact. On the day of the accident at 9:46:13 a.m., sounds of the pilot performing an engine run-up test were recorded, along with the words "prop test" in a whispered voice. 35 to 45 seconds later, the word "trim" was whispered, followed eight seconds later by a two-word phrase: "<expletive> it".

At 9:47:52, the words "We have eighty knots, feathers armed" were spoken and at 9:48:01, the sound of the propellers operating unsynchronized was recorded. At 9:48:05, a two-word phrase "the <expletive>" was recorded. Then, at 9:48:16, the pilot radioed the tower, saying "and Tower, just declaring an emergency, ah, we just lost, loss the left engine" followed almost immediately by the sound of the stall warning horn. The horn was recorded twice more, and then at 9:48:25 the pilot spoke a phrase starting with an expletive and ending "we're going in; we're dead".

Emergency procedures call for the malfunctioning engine’s propeller to be feathered and the landing gear to be retracted (gear-up) for an engine failure during takeoff. Inspection of the aircraft revealed that neither propeller was feathered and the landing gear was extended. The aircraft was equipped with an autofeather system and a rudder boost system but their operational condition at the time of the crash is unknown due to extensive post-crash fire damage. On March 1, 2016, the NTSB released its final report on the accident, and states under the heading Probable Cause and Findings that:

The National Transportation Safety Board determines the probable cause(s) of this accident to be: The pilot's failure to maintain lateral control of the airplane after a reduction in left engine power and his application of inappropriate rudder input. Contributing to the accident was the pilot's failure to follow the emergency procedures for an engine failure during takeoff. Also contributing to the accident was the left engine power reduction for reasons that could not be determined because a postaccident examination did not reveal any anomalies that would have precluded normal operation and thermal damage precluded a complete examination.

== Aftermath ==
A year after the accident, in October 2015, FlightSafety announced that the damaged portion of the training center was to be torn down and the land occupied by the building returned to the city of Wichita.

== See also ==
- 2006 New York City plane crash
