= Wichita Dwight D. Eisenhower National Airport =

Airport serving Wichita, Kansas, United States

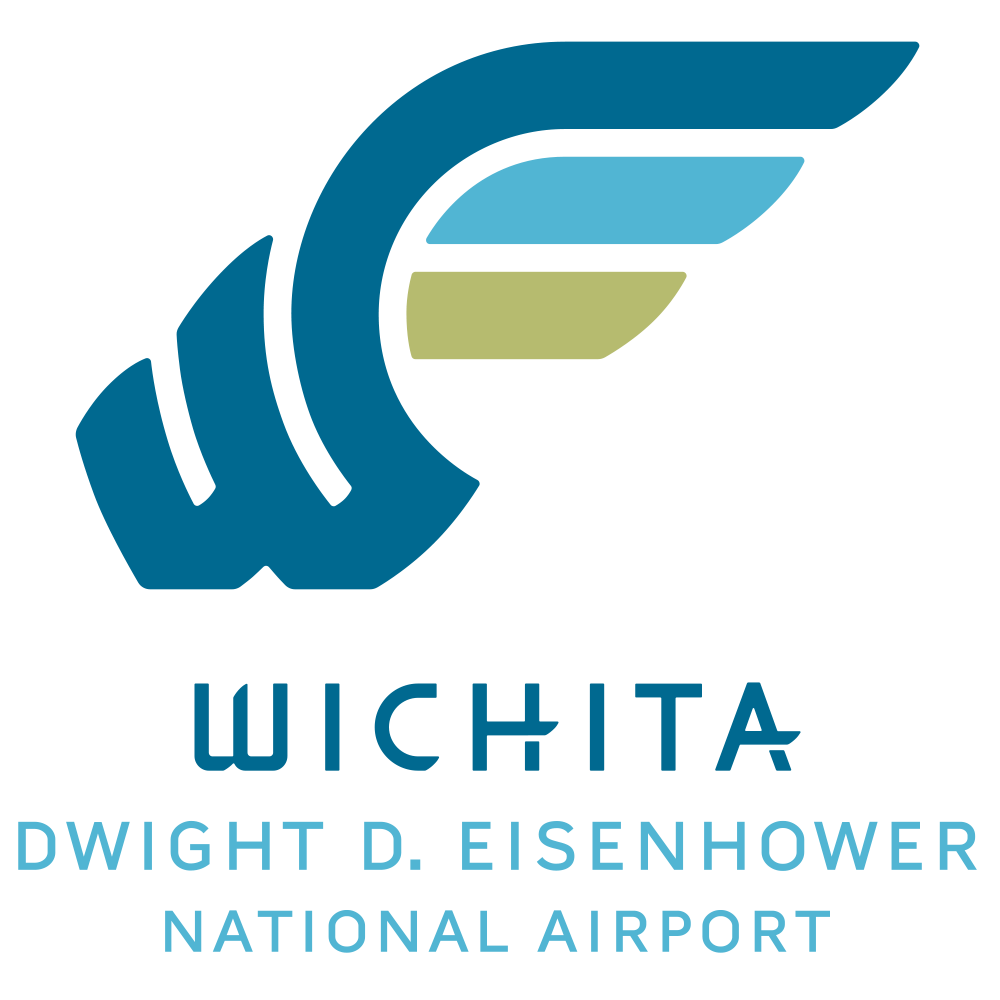

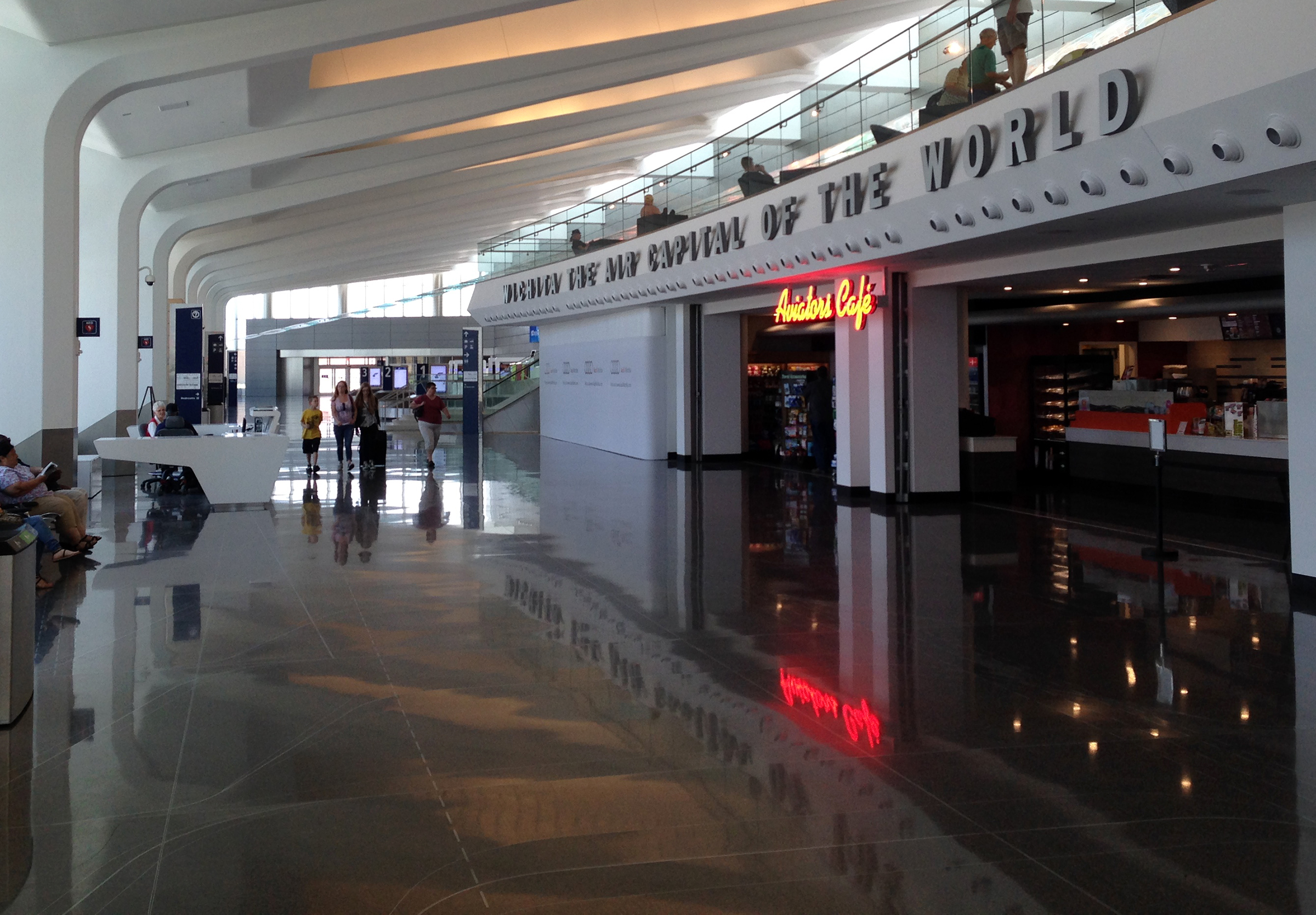
- Interior of ICT's passenger terminal in 2015
- IATA: ICT; ICAO: KICT; FAA LID: ICT

Summary
- Airport type: Public
- Owner: City of Wichita
- Operator: Wichita Airport Authority
- Serves: South Central Kansas (Wichita/Hutchinson, Kansas)
- Location: Wichita, Kansas, United States
- Opened: March 31, 1935; 91 years ago
- Elevation AMSL: 1,333 ft (406 m)
- Coordinates: 37°39′0″N 97°25′59″W
- Website: flywichita.com

Maps
- FAA airport diagram
- Interactive map of Wichita Dwight D. Eisenhower National Airport

Runways
Direction	Length		Surface
Direction	ft	m	Surface
1L/19R	10,302	3,140	Concrete
1R/19L	7,302	2,226	Concrete
14/32	6,301	1,921	Concrete

Statistics (2025)
- Passengers: 1,867,723 ▲3.24%
- Aircraft operations: 117,671 ▲0.97%

Wichita Dwight D. Eisenhower National Airport (IATA: ICT, ICAO: KICT, FAA LID: ICT) is a commercial airport 7 miles (11 km) west of downtown Wichita, Kansas, United States. It is the largest and busiest airport in Kansas. Located south of US-54 in southwest Wichita, it covers 3,248 acres (1,314 ha) and contains three runways.

The airport is also referred to as Eisenhower National Airport or by its former name Mid-Continent Airport. The airport code, ICT, is also a nickname for the city. It was known as Wichita Mid-Continent Airport from 1973 until 2014, when it was renamed in honor of Dwight D. Eisenhower, the 34th President of the United States from 1953 to 1961. His boyhood home, museum, and Presidential Library are at the Eisenhower Presidential Center in Abilene, Kansas. The name change was approved by the City of Wichita in May 2014, and made official by the Federal Aviation Administration (FAA) on November 13, 2014. The airport's current passenger terminal opened on Wednesday, June 3, 2015.

ICT Airport is also the site of the Cessna headquarters and main manufacturing plant, as well as a Bombardier service center for Learjet and other business jet aircraft.

== History ==
Since 1924, the largest airport in Wichita has had three major terminals, including moving its location from the southeast to the southwest side of the city.

=== Wichita Municipal Airport ===
In October 1924, Wichita hosted more than 100,000 people for the National Air Congress. City planners used the event to raise funds for a proposed Wichita Municipal Airport. The event was a success, and the city held ground-breaking ceremonies for the airport on June 28, 1929. The airport was then about 6 miles (10 km) southeast of the older Wichita city limits. Wichita Municipal Airport was officially dedicated on March 31, 1935.

In August 1941, during World War II, the Kansas National Guard 127th Observation Squadron was activated as the first military unit assigned to the Wichita airport.

By the summer of 1950, Boeing was ready to turn out the first production B-47 Stratojets, and the United States Air Force sought to make Wichita Airport a permanent military installation. Public hearings began to consider locating an Air Force base near the Wichita Boeing facilities, and the city of Wichita received $9.4 million to build a new municipal airfield.

On May 31, 1951, the USAF took title to the airport. Civil and military flights shared the airport until the city completed a new airport in October 1954. The Wichita Municipal Airport was renamed Wichita Air Force Base, then renamed again to its current name of McConnell Air Force Base.

Wichita eventually acquired the original terminal in 1980. In the late 1980s, volunteers entered the building with wheelbarrows and shovels and began the arduous cleaning task. The building was named the Kansas Aviation Museum and opened on April 19, 1991, to showcase Kansas aviation history.

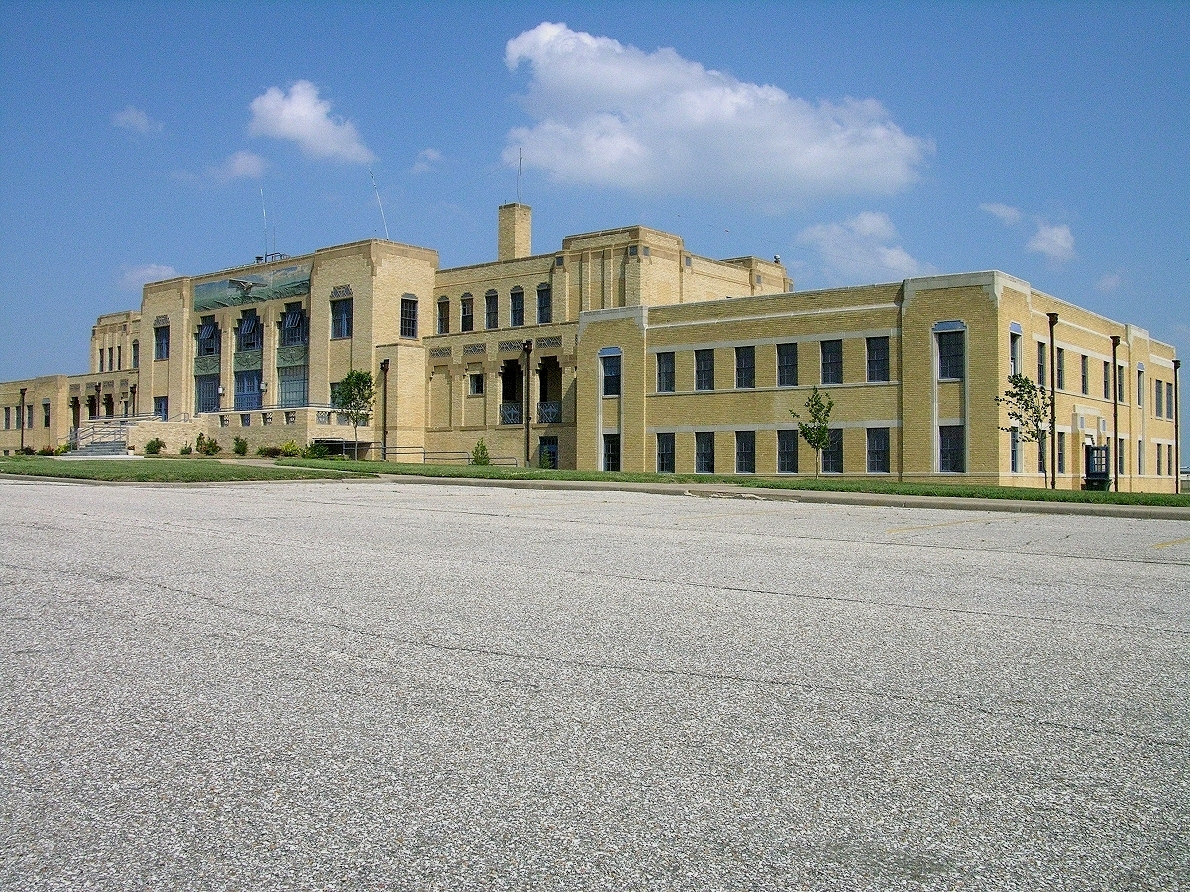
Kansas Aviation Museum, former Wichita Municipal Airport terminal from 1935 to 1951, located in southeast Wichita

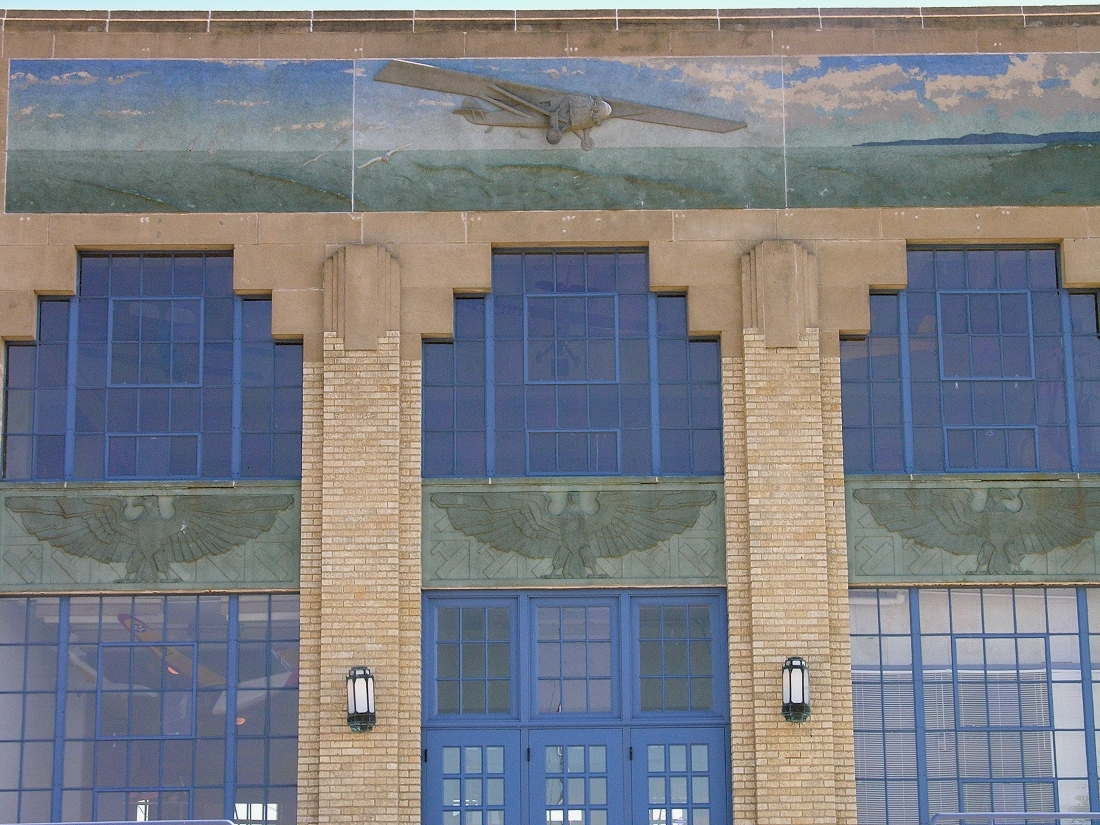
Bas-relief of the Spirit of St. Louis crossing the Atlantic above entrance

=== Wichita Mid-Continent Airport ===
In 1951, the United States Air Force brought proceedings to condemn and acquire the Wichita Municipal Airport for what was to become McConnell Air Force Base. Wichita's park board quickly acquired 1,923 acres (778 ha) of land in southwest Wichita, and the construction of a new "Wichita Municipal Airport" took about three and a half years. The airport opened to general aviation traffic in 1953, and airline flights moved to the new airport on April 1, 1954. The new airport was dedicated on October 31, 1954, with two runways. It became Wichita Mid-Continent Airport in 1973 after Kansas City renamed its Mid-Continent Airport to Kansas City International Airport.

The airport's ICT designation is an abbreviation for Wichita. At the time, the FCC prohibited airport codes starting with "K" or "W," which were the standard starting letters for radio stations in the United States, by international treaty. Naming conventions of the time then called for the airport to use the second letter of the city and then used any phonetics to make it easier to identify. Similarly, Kansas City could not get a KCI designation when it renamed its Mid-Continent International Airport to Kansas City International Airport in 1972 (so Kansas City still has MCI as its designation). IATA is reluctant to change designations once they appear on maps.

The April 1957 Official Airline Guide shows 11 weekday departures on Braniff, 10 TWA, 4 Continental, 3 Central, and 2 Ozark. Nonstop flights did not reach beyond Denver, Amarillo, Oklahoma City, and Kansas City. In 1964, TWA had the first scheduled jet flights.

The airport built two concourses attached to the terminal building with 10 gates in 1976. The airport renovated the ticketing areas and added two gates in 1985. The airport completed a $6 million renovation of the terminal in 1989.

Since 1991 the airfield has also hosted the Bombardier Aerospace Flight Test Centre (BFTC, former Learjet facility).

==== Old Terminal ====
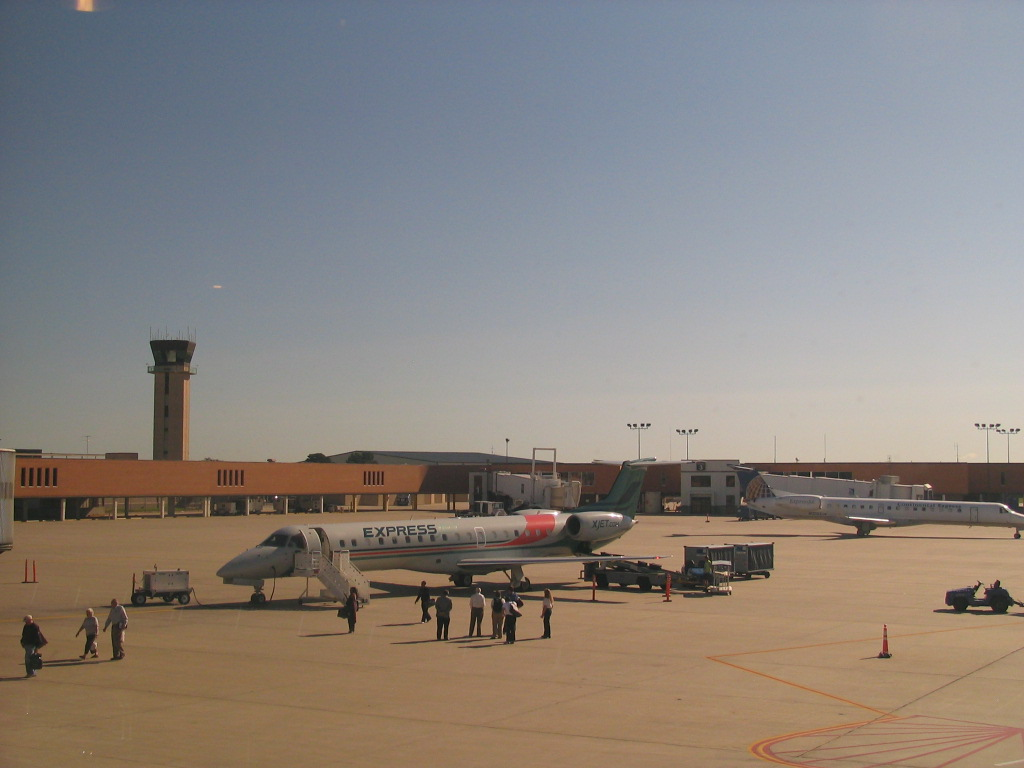
A Chicago-bound ExpressJet sitting on the ramp in 2009, in front of the old terminal

The Old Terminal had two concourses, East and West, each with six gates. The Old Terminal closed permanently on June 2, 2015, and was later demolished. The East Concourse was served by Allegiant Air, American Airlines, and Delta Air Lines at the time of its closure; it had previously served Continental, Northwest, Seaport Airlines, TWA, Vanguard and Western Pacific. The West Concourse had Southwest Airlines and United Airlines at the time of its closure; it was previously served by Air Midwest, AirTran, Braniff, Frontier, Republic Airlines, Western Airlines, and USAir Express (later US Airways Express).

=== Wichita Dwight D. Eisenhower National Airport ===
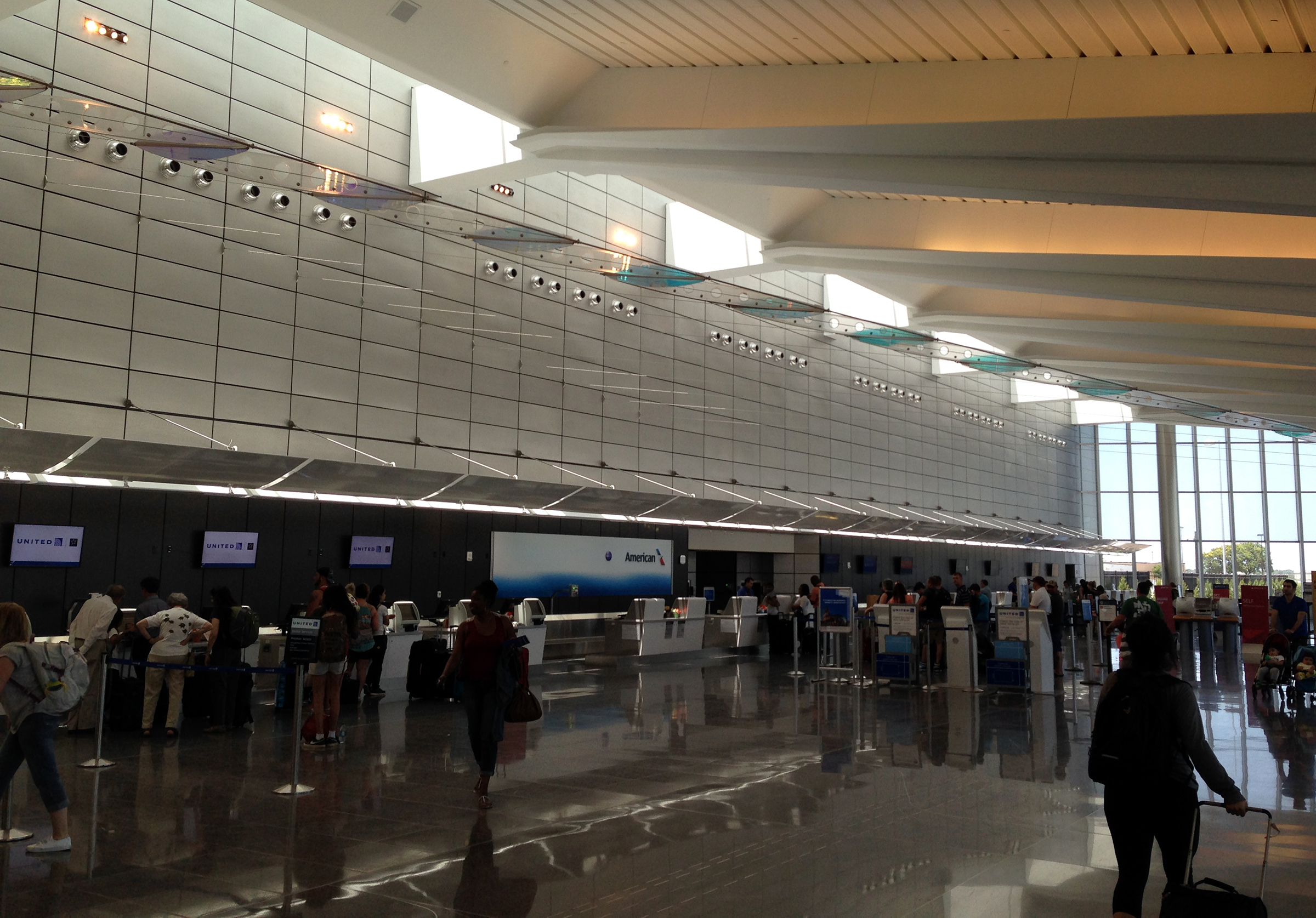
The check-in area at the new terminal in 2015

On March 4, 2014, the Wichita City Council approved changing the name from Wichita Mid-Continent Airport to Wichita Dwight D. Eisenhower National Airport, in honor of former president, general, and Kansas native Dwight D. Eisenhower.

Groundbreaking ceremonies for the new terminal took place on September 13, 2012. Construction started on October 9, 2012. The new terminal opened on June 3, 2015. The airport demolished the previous terminal as the new terminal became fully operational.

The new terminal is just west of the previous terminal. The two-story, 272,000 sq ft (25,300 m^{2}) terminal, designed by HNTB, is a modern architectural design expressing Wichita's prominent position in the aviation industry. Other contractors included AECOM, providing project management services, and Key/Walbridge Joint Venture, serving as the general contractor. Aviation themed exhibits are part of the terminal's design. Major elements include:

- New terminal roadway and covered curb with separate lanes for private and commercial vehicles.
- Terminal building with enlarged ticketing and baggage claim on the main entry level.
- Upper-level concourse with departure lounges, concessions, and expanded passenger security screening.
- 12 boarding gates, each with a boarding bridge. Up to 16 boarding bridges total.
- Original tenant airlines: American Airlines, Delta Air Lines, Southwest Airlines, and United Airlines each leased two gates. Allegiant Air leased one gate.
- Baggage handling systems with inline explosives detection security screening.
- Enhanced pre-security and post-security concessions and passenger services.
- Consolidated rental car facility counters, close-in parking, and car return in the covered garage.
- Covered daily, short, and long-term parking in a multi-level garage directly across from the new terminal.
- Short-term and long-term public parking plus a new expanded Park & Ride shuttle parking lot.
- Parking with at least 3,000 spaces.
- New communications, life safety, and security systems.
- New aircraft apron for the new terminal and gates.
- Free wifi.

The new Terminal/Concourse opened on June 3, 2015. The airport has one terminal and one concourse with 12 gates, all with glass jetways that can accommodate most current commercial aircraft.

== Airlines and destinations ==
=== Passenger ===
Airlines	Destinations
Alaska Airlines	Seattle/Tacoma
Allegiant Air	Gulf Shores (begins May 20, 2027), Las Vegas, Phoenix/Mesa, St. Petersburg/Clearwater; Seasonal: Destin/Fort Walton Beach, Orlando/Sanford
American Airlines	Seasonal: Dallas/Fort Worth
American Eagle	Chicago–O'Hare, Dallas/Fort Worth, Phoenix–Sky Harbor, Washington–National; Seasonal: Miami
Delta Air Lines	Atlanta
Delta Connection	Minneapolis/St. Paul
Southwest Airlines	Chicago–Midway, Denver, Las Vegas, Nashville (begins March 11, 2027); Seasonal: Orlando, Phoenix–Sky Harbor
United Airlines	Chicago-O'Hare, Denver; Seasonal: Houston–Intercontinental
United Express	Chicago–O'Hare, Denver, Houston–Intercontinental

Passenger destinations map
Domestic destinations from Wichita Dwight D. Eisenhower National Airport
Red = Year-round destination
Green = Seasonal destination
Blue = Future destination

=== Cargo ===
Airlines	Destinations
FedEx Express	Memphis,
FedEx Feeder operated by Baron Aviation Services	Garden City
UPS Airlines	Louisville

== Statistics ==
=== Aviation activity ===
Annual traffic
	Passenger volume	Change over previous year	Total aircraft operations	Cargo tonnage
2000	1,227,083	▼1.70%	218,225	25,456
2001	1,129,381	▼7.96%	216,652	24,919
2002	1,337,270	▲18.41%	204,007	34,743
2003	1,431,610	▲7.05%	184,015	33,662
2004	1,498,749	▲4.69%	176,089	37,328
2005	1,486,590	▼0.81%	176,554	38,749
2006	1,460,341	▼1.77%	178,925	39,058
2007	1,596,229	▲9.31%	157,654	35,627
2008	1,619,075	▲1.43%	167,419	33,170
2009	1,505,607	▼7.01%	145,691	25,992
2010	1,549,395	▲2.91%	146,417	25,842
2011	1,536,354	▼0.84%	153,320	24,134
2012	1,509,206	▼1.77%	165,035	23,258
2013	1,505,514	▼0.24%	149,377	24,263
2014	1,533,669	▲1.87%	133,198	25,606
2015	1,571,348	▲2.46%	117,867	25,772
2016	1,602,311	▲1.97%	115,402	25,134
2017	1,620,240	▲1.12%	111,581	25,356
2018	1,665,116	▲2.77%	96,655	27,135
2019	1,749,906	▲5.09%	105,465	28,758
2020	791,200	▼54.79%	82,924	28,292
2021	1,285,070	▲63.28%	94,599	31,276
2022	1,534,965	▲19.45%	109,448	30,136
2023	1,721,990	▲12.18%	114,293	26,568
2024	1,809,142	▲5.06%	117,671	23,129
2025	1,867,723	▲3.24%	119,654	18,004

=== Top destinations ===
Busiest domestic routes from ICT (January 2025 – December 2025)
Rank	Airport	Passengers	Carriers
1	Denver, Colorado	163,890	Southwest, United
2	Dallas/Fort Worth, Texas	161,430	American
3	Chicago, Illinois	129,380	American, United
4	(Georgia (U.S. state)) Atlanta, Georgia	102,850	Delta
5	Houston, Texas	75,900	United
6	St. Louis, Missouri	64,360	Southwest
7	Las Vegas, Nevada	54,810	Allegiant, Southwest
8	Phoenix, Arizona	45,740	American, Southwest
9	Minneapolis/St. Paul, Minnesota	30,310	Delta
10	(Washington (state)) Seattle, Washington	22,050	Alaska

=== Airline market share ===
Largest airlines at ICT (September 2024 – August 2025)
Rank	Carrier	Passengers	Share
1	SkyWest	415,000	23.22%
2	Southwest	375,000	20.97%
3	Delta	198,000	11.09%
4	Envoy	183,000	10.24%
5	United	148,000	8.27%
-	Other	469,000	26.20%

== Accidents and incidents ==
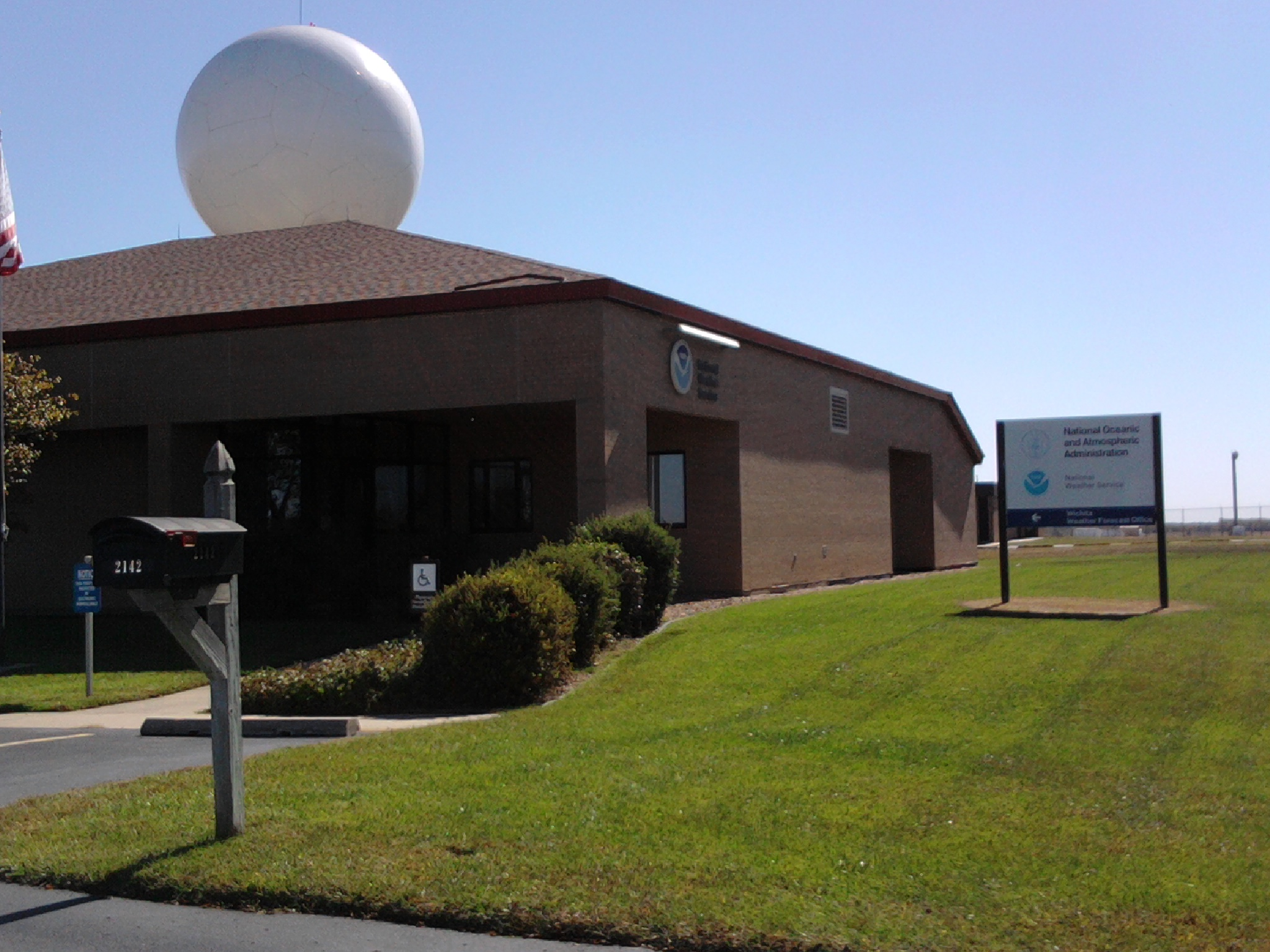
National Weather Service office, located west of the runways along Tyler Road (2010)

- On October 10, 2000, 2:52 p.m., a Canadair Challenger CL-604 (CL-600-2B16) crashed during an experimental test flight. The plane burst into flames on impact, and part of the wreckage landed on Tyler Road along the airport's west side. Investigators say the crash was a result of pilot error and shifting fuel. The pilot and flight test engineer died. The co-pilot was seriously injured and died 36 days later.
- On December 13, 2013, Terry Lee Loewen, an avionics technician, was arrested for attempting to bomb the airport. A Muslim convert, he is alleged to have spent several months planning a suicide attack with a carload of explosives.
- On January 19, 2014, at 12:30 a.m., an Oklahoma man rammed his pickup truck through a security gate at the airport and was found waving documents at a small plane.
- On October 30, 2014, 9:49 a.m., a twin-engine Beechcraft B200 Super King Air 200 lost power in one engine during takeoff then crashed into the two-story FlightSafety International training building several blocks northeast of the airport terminal at 37°39′35″N 97°25′30″W. The building sustained serious damage, including the collapse of walls and a portion of the roof. The airplane had one person aboard it, the pilot, who died. Four people died, including three in the facility, and six were injured. See 2014 Wichita King Air crash for full details.
- On October 20, 2023, at 6:55 p.m., a Cessna 172 had to make an emergency landing near Towne West Mall due to engine failure. The Cessna 172, registration N1413Y, landed on Tracy Street, hitting a few street signs. The pilot, a 27-year-old female, suffered minor injuries.

== Nearby airports ==
Other airports in Wichita

- Colonel James Jabara Airport (northeast Wichita)
- Beech Factory Airport
- Cessna Aircraft Field
- McConnell Air Force Base (southeast Wichita)
- Westport Airport

Other airports in metro

- Augusta Municipal Airport (west of Augusta, Kansas)
- Lloyd Stearman Field (south of Benton, Kansas)

Other airports in region

- List of airports in Kansas
- List of airports in Oklahoma

== See also ==
- List of airports in Kansas
- Wichita Transit
