= Alva Lease Duckwall =

- Alva Lease Duckwall
- Born: Alva Lease Duckwall; August 30, 1877; Batavia, Ohio, U.S.
- Died: August 2, 1937 (aged 59); Abilene, Kansas, U.S.
- Occupations: Founder of ALCO and Duckwall's five and dime stores
- Spouse: Retta Leota White (m. 1904)
- Children: Dorris Moyne Duckwall (1906 - 1992); Donna Gayle Duckwall Brainard (1907 - 1986); Alva Lease Duckwall, Jr. (1919 - 1996)

Alva Lease "A.L." ("Lease") Duckwall (August 30, 1877 – August 2, 1937) was an American businessman and entrepreneur, best known for founding the retailers ALCO and Duckwall's five and dime stores.

== Early life ==
Alva Lease Duckwall was born to Francis Marion Duckwall and Sara Elizabeth Slade on a farm near Batavia, Ohio. The Duckwall Family moved to Greenleaf, Kansas in 1898, where A.L. opened and operated a repair shop for sewing machines and bicycles. Duckwall sold the Grenleaf shop, and in 1901, purchased a variety store nearby Abilene, which offered for sale small items needed around the home. Joined by his brother, Wilbur, they called the store "Duckwall Bros. RACKET STORE - A Little of Everything."

== A Chain of Duckwall's stores ==
After the Abilene store, a second variety store was opened nearby Salina in 1906, and managed by Wilbur. Other Duckwall's stores were opened in Central Kansas, in the cities of Manhattan, Clay Center (1910), Concordia (1911), Junction City, and Great Bend (1914). By 1915, a corporation was formed by the name of "The A.L. Duckwall Stores Company", with A.L. as president and General Manager.

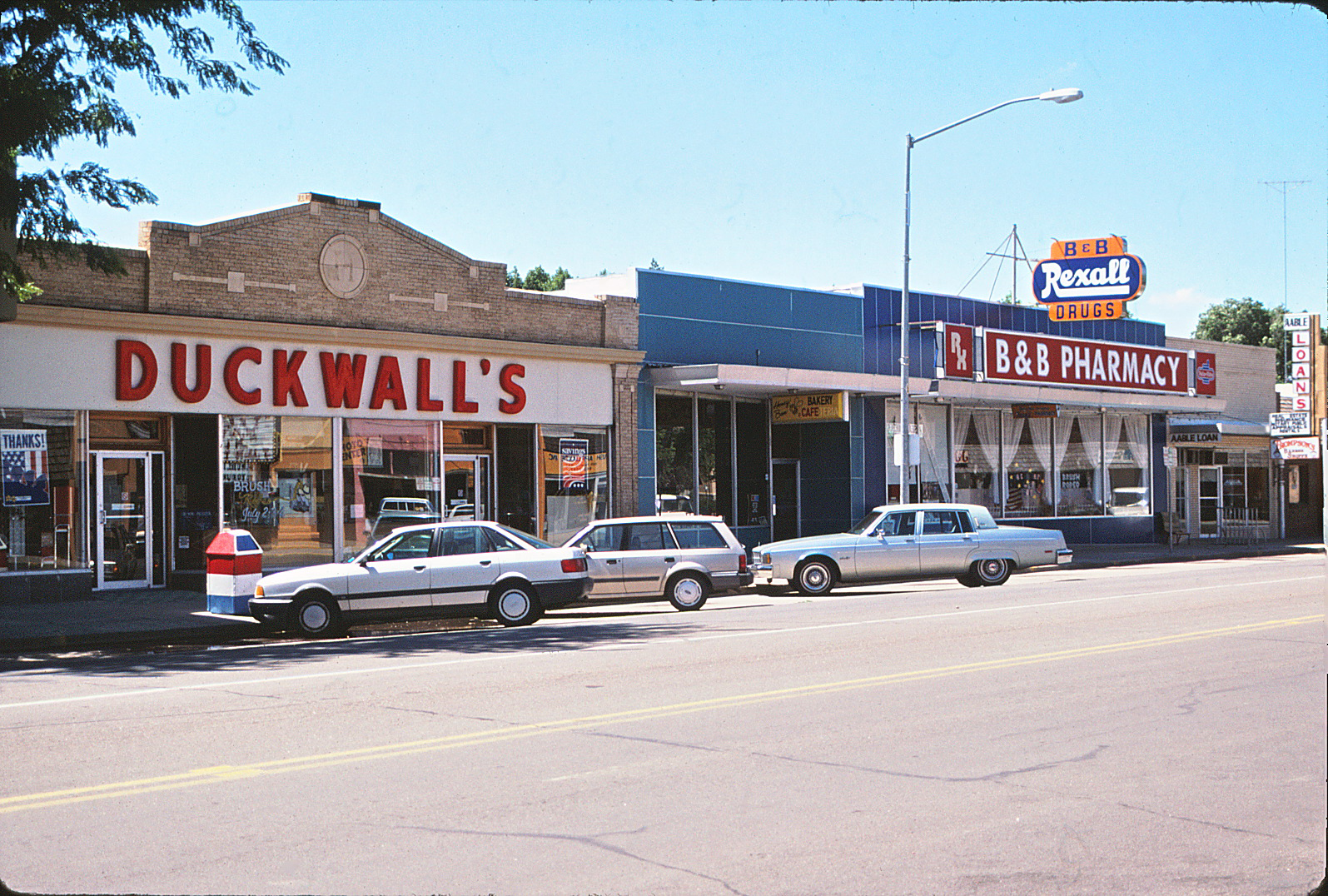
Duckwall's variety store photographed in Brush, Colorado, in 1991.

== ALCO Stores ==
Though A.L. Duckwall would not live to see it, The A.L. Duckwall Stores Company began to venture away from the limited five and dime variety store and into the discount retail business. The first ALCO stores were opened in 1968 to provide a full selection of merchandise. The corporation, still based in Abilene, Kansas, eventually became ALCO Stores, Inc., but would continue to operate both ALCO and Duckwall's stores. As of June 2008, the corporation operated 205 ALCO stores and 59 Duckwall's stores. A second bankruptcy for ALCO Stores, Inc. in 2014 led to the closure of all stores by this time.

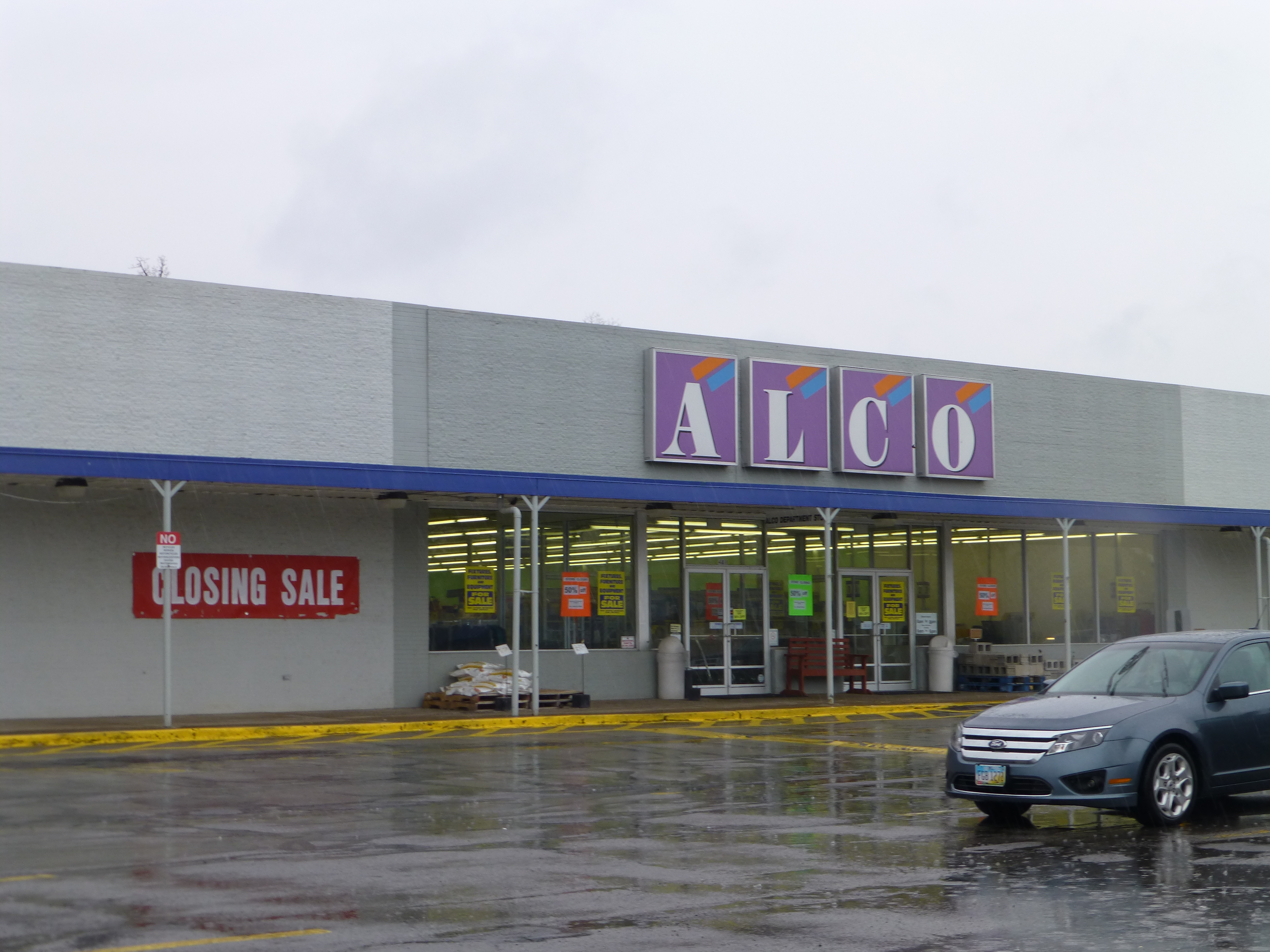
An ALCO store that was closed April 29, 2013 in Vermilion, Ohio.

== Personal life ==
A.L. Duckwall had married Retta White in 1904, and had three children: daughters Doris and Donna, and son Junior. Over his life, Duckwall belonged to the Lutheran Church, Rotary Club, Knights Templars, Shrines, and Democratic Party.

=== Death ===
Duckwall died of a heart attack in his office in 1937. He was laid to rest at Abilene Cemetery. At the time of his death, Duckwall had built over 40 variety stores in Kansas and Colorado.

== Legacy ==
In 2000, Duckwall was inducted into the Kansas Business Hall of Fame as recipient of the Historical Honors Award from Emporia State University School of Business. Daughter-in-law Aileen Duckwall accepted the award from Kansas Governor Bill Graves.
