= Eisenhower Home =

Historic house in Kansas, United States

- U.S. National Register of Historic Places
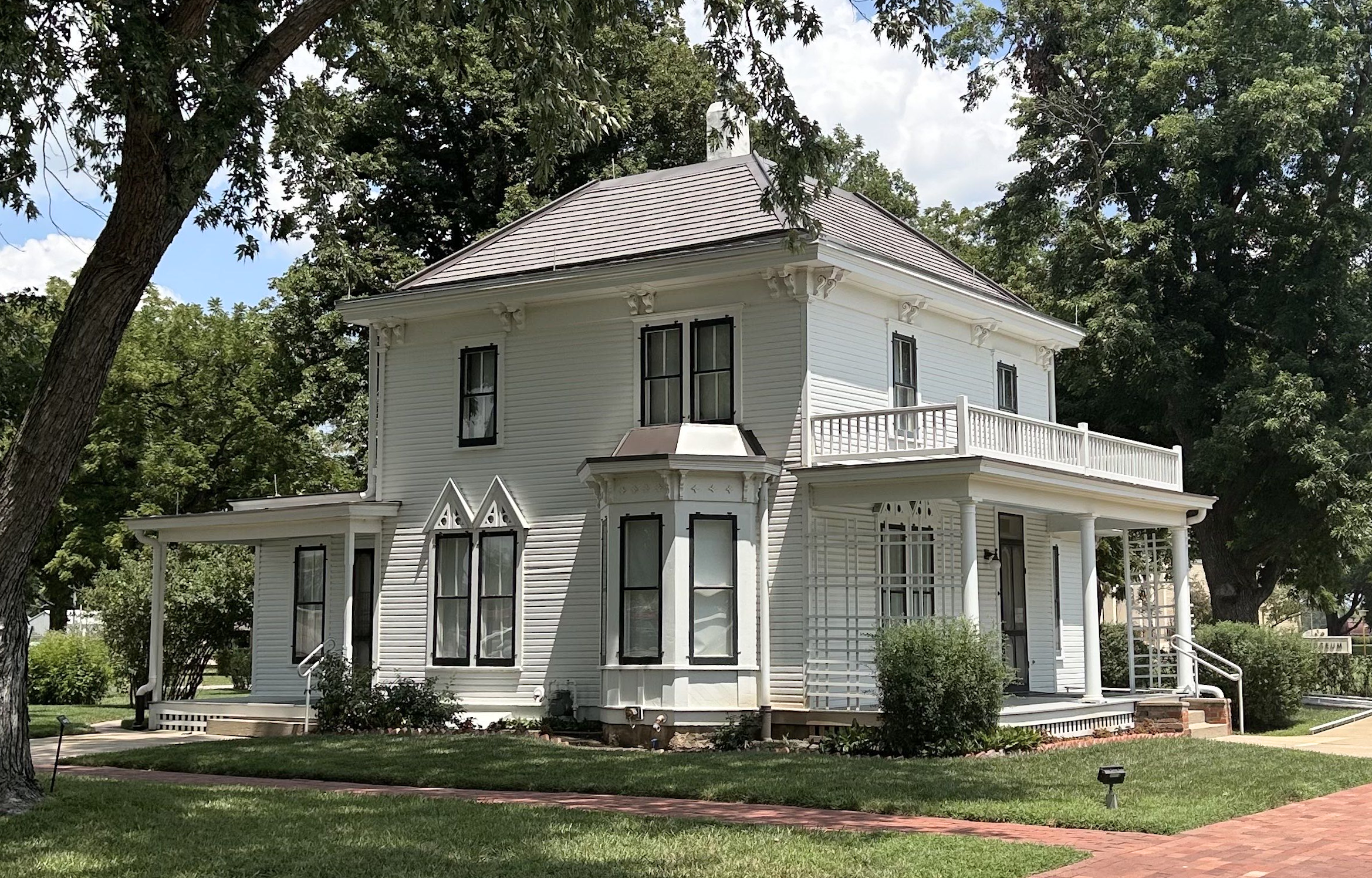

- Location within Kansas Location within the United States
- Location: 201 SE 4th St., Abilene, Kansas
- Coordinates: 38°54′45″N 97°12′42″W
- Area: 1 acre (0.40 ha)
- Built: 1898
- NRHP reference No.: 71000306
- Added to NRHP: January 25, 1971

The Eisenhower Home in Abilene, Kansas, at the Eisenhower Presidential Center, was the house where U.S. president Dwight D. Eisenhower lived with his five brothers from 1898 to 1911, when he entered the U.S. Military Academy at West Point at age 20. In 1898 Eisenhower's father, David Jacob Eisenhower, and his wife Ida Elizabeth Stover Eisenhower, bought the house from David's uncle Abraham. David and Ida lived in the house until their deaths in 1942 and 1946.

The two-story wood-frame house has a hipped roof with a central chimney. There is a one-story addition on the east side, a porch on the south side, which is the front of the house, and a small porch on the west side. The lower level has a parlor, dining room and kitchen. The upper level has two large bedrooms and one small bedroom.

After Ida's death the Eisenhower brothers gave the house and its contents to a memorial foundation for preservation. The house is operated as a museum on the grounds of the Dwight D. Eisenhower Presidential Library, Museum and Boyhood Home, which also houses Dwight and Mamie Eisenhower's gravesite. The house was placed on the National Register of Historic Places on January 25, 1971.

== See also ==
- Eisenhower Presidential Center
- Eisenhower birthplace in Denison, Texas, where he was born on October 14, 1890
