= Middleburg, Iowa =

- Unincorporated community
- Location within the state of Iowa Middleburg, Iowa (the United States)
- Coordinates: 43°6′48.94″N 96°4′8.07″W
- Country: United States
- State: Iowa
- County: Sioux
- Area code: 712

Middleburg is an unincorporated community in Iowa, United States. Located in Sioux County, it is near Sioux Center, Boyden and Orange City.

== History ==
Middleburg's population was 47 in 1925. The population was 67 in 1940.
