= ALCO Stores =

Defunct retail store

ALCO Stores, Inc.
- Type: Public
- Traded as: Nasdaq: ALCS
- Industry: Retail
- Founded: 1901; 125 years ago
- Defunct: March 23, 2015
- Fate: Bankruptcy and liquidation
- Headquarters: Coppell, Texas
- Products: Clothing, footwear, bedding, furniture, jewelry, beauty products, electronics, market, housewares
- Website: Final pre-bankruptcy announcement (Oct 2014) web.archive.org/web/20141007133019/http://www.alcostores.com/ Final post-bankruptcy (Mar 2015) web.archive.org/web/20150323003222/http://alcostores.com/

ALCO Stores, Inc. (formerly Duckwall-ALCO Stores) was a retail chain operating 198 stores in 23 states, primarily in the United States Midwest. The company was founded in 1901 in Kansas by Alva Lease Duckwall.

It had its headquarters in Coppell, Texas. The company's 352,000-square-foot (32,700 m^{2}) distribution center was located in Abilene, Kansas, where it was previously headquartered.

In October 2014, ALCO filed for Chapter 11 bankruptcy; subsequently, the chain was sold to a liquidation firm and closed all of its stores by March 2015.

== History ==
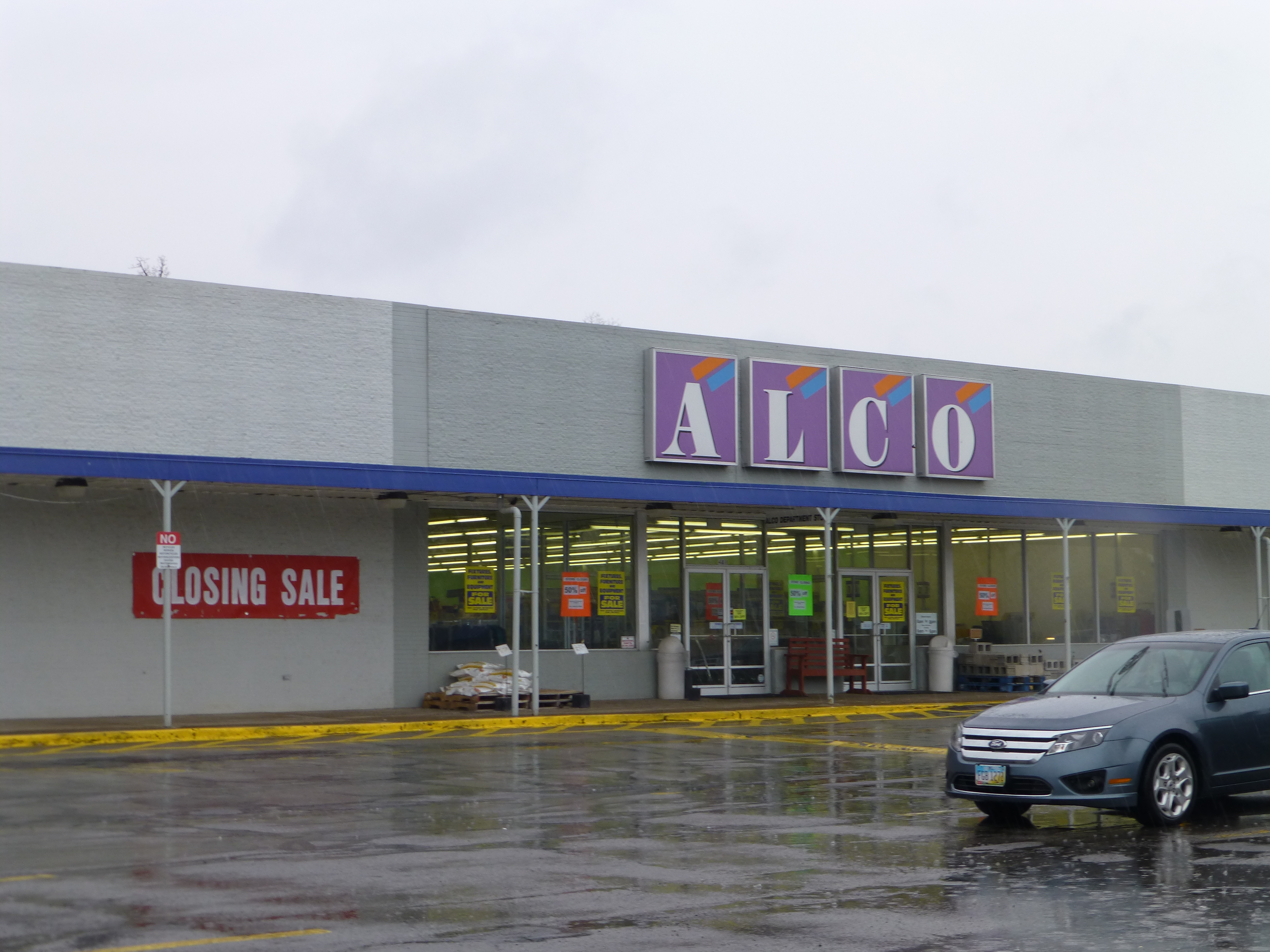
An ALCO store that was closed April 29, 2013 in Vermilion, Ohio.

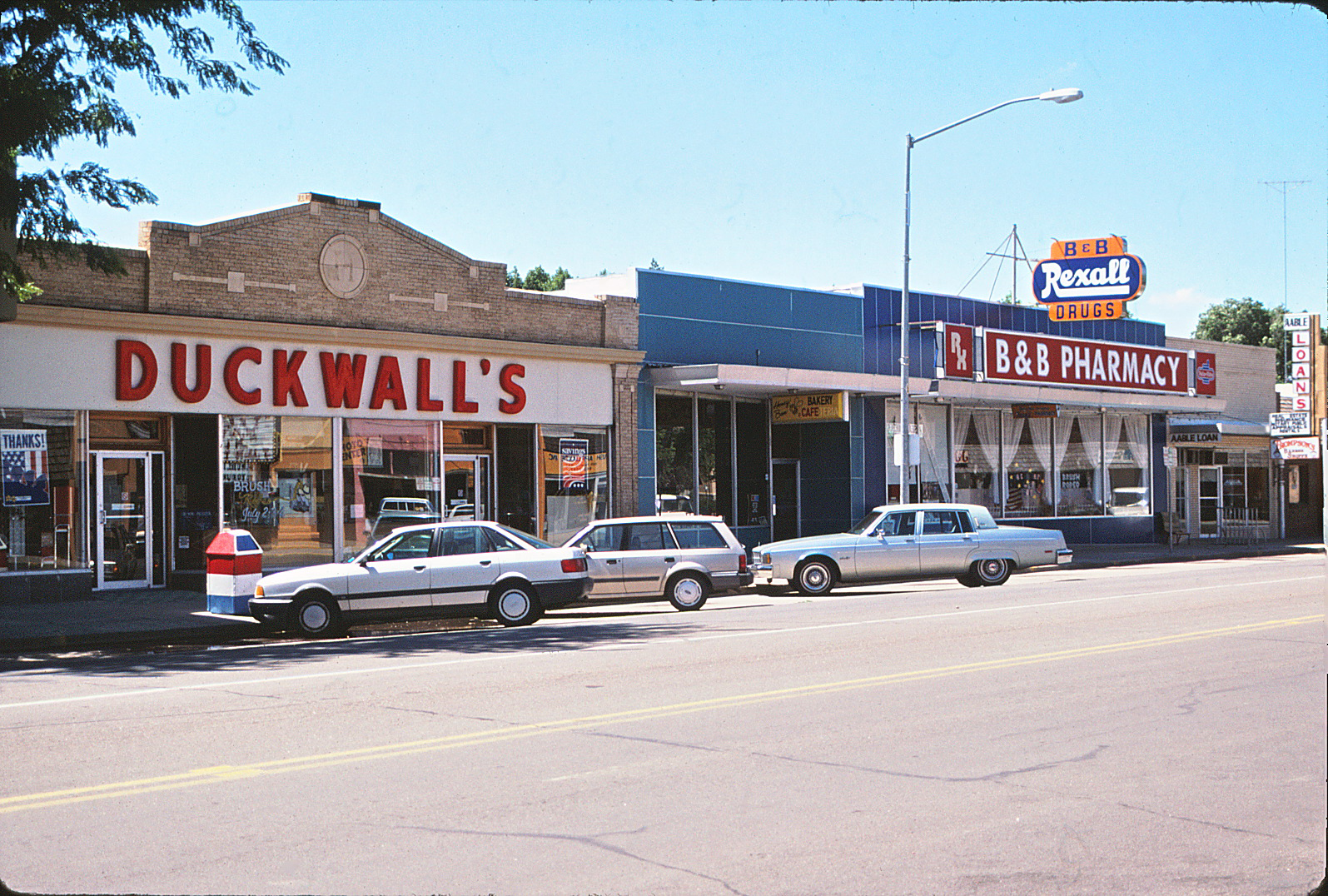
Duckwall's variety store photographed in Brush, Colorado, in 1991.

In its early years the company operated five and dime (or "variety") stores called Duckwall's. Duckwall's began their foray into the discount retail business with the opening of the first ALCO store in Clovis, New Mexico, on August 15, 1966. ALCO stores (somewhat smaller than a non-supercenter Walmart) provided the full selection of merchandise offered by the company, as opposed to the five-and-dime store's limitations.

In 1985, after three acquisitions, the company went through a management-led leveraged buy-out. The company had 127 ALCO stores, and 33 Duckwalls in 14 states at that time.

=== First bankruptcy and later history ===
In May 1989, Duckwall-ALCO filed Chapter 11 bankruptcy, emerging in 1991 after securing financing from GE Capital, its primary creditor. At least 52 stores were closed during this period. After 1989 they switched to the business strategy of targeting communities where no direct retail competitor existed (such as Walmart, Target or Kmart). The strategy initially proved to be successful for the chain, and there were 205 ALCO stores and 59 Duckwall stores as of June 2008.

The company previously experimented with a combination discount and food store called C.O.L.A. (Cost of Living Adjusters) in Mineral Wells, Texas, which was discontinued. The company also began a supercenter concept, ALCO Market Place, by providing limited perishable goods. These stores were considerably smaller than Walmart's or Target's supercenter stores.

Duckwall-ALCO stores announced on November 29, 2010, the closure of all 44 of its Duckwall stores, thus ending the Duckwall name. The store in Hettinger, North Dakota, was reopened as an ALCO while the remaining 43 stores permanently closed. Subsequently, the chain dropped the Duckwall name and renamed itself simply as ALCO Stores, Inc.

In the Fall of 2011, ALCO stores opened its first store in the Dallas-Fort Worth Metroplex suburb of Grand Prairie, Texas, but closed the store in May 2014 due to lackluster sales.

On April 10, 2013, ALCO Stores, Inc. moved its corporate headquarters from Abilene, Kansas, to Coppell, Texas.

=== Second bankruptcy and liquidation ===
On October 12, 2014, ALCO Stores Inc. filed for Chapter 11 bankruptcy citing "increased competition" and "declining consumer and business confidence, which has led to decreased customer traffic and reduced levels of consumer spending, particularly on discretionary items." On November 17, bidding on the company through bankruptcy court ended with a liquidation firm joint venture, which provided a "stalking horse bid" and the only bid received by the court, being approved as the new owner.

Going out of business sales at all locations started on November 21, 2014. The last ALCO store closed in March 2015.

20 locations were acquired by Shopko, and were converted into Shopko Hometown stores. Those locations closed permanently after Shopko filed for bankruptcy in 2019. Bomgaars took over 12 former locations. Orscheln Farm & Home acquired ALCO's former distribution center in Abilene, Kansas. Other locations were acquired by various entities, either before closure or afterwards (for example, Brookshire Brothers acquired the ALCO location in Pilot Point, Texas).

== Acquisitions ==
- 1983 - Sterling Stores Co. Inc was acquired. Based in Little Rock, Arkansas, it operated 48 stores under the Sterling and Magic Mart names in Mississippi and Arkansas. The majority of these stores were converted to either ALCO or Duckwall stores, though the Sterling nameplate was maintained until 2005 when the final Sterling store in Little Rock, Arkansas was closed.
- 1984 - David's in Wichita, Kansas
- 1985 - Hornsby, a 9-store chain based in Morris, Illinois, was acquired.
- 1996 - Val chain of 14 stores in Indiana and Ohio, with headquarters in New Castle, Indiana, was acquired.
- 1997 - Acquired 18 stores from Perry Brothers, located in Texas and New Mexico, which were converted to Duckwall stores.
