= List of airports in Pennsylvania =

This is a list of airports in the U.S. state of Pennsylvania, grouped by type and sorted by location. The list includes public-use and military airports in the state. Some private-use and former airports may be included where notable, such as airports that were previously public-use, those with commercial enplanements recorded by the FAA, or airports assigned an IATA airport code.

== Airports ==
This list contains the following information:

- **City served** – The city generally associated with the airport, as per the airport's master record with the Federal Aviation Administration. This is not always the actual location since some airports are located in smaller towns outside of the city they serve. It is not meant to be a complete list of cities served, which can be found in or added to each airport's Wikipedia article.
- **FAA** – The location identifier assigned by the Federal Aviation Administration (FAA). These are linked to each airport's page at the Pennsylvania Department of Transportation Bureau of Aviation.
- **IATA** – The airport code assigned by the International Air Transport Association (IATA). Those that do not match the FAA code are shown in bold.
- **ICAO** – The location indicator assigned by the International Civil Aviation Organization (ICAO).
- **Airport name** – The official airport name. Those shown in **bold** indicate the airport has scheduled passenger service on commercial airlines.
- **Role** – One of four FAA airport categories, as per the 2021–2025 National Plan of Integrated Airport Systems (NPIAS) report released September 2020:
  - P-s: Commercial service – primary are publicly owned airports that receive scheduled passenger service and have more than 10,000 passenger boardings (enplanements) each year. Each primary airport is sub-classified by the FAA as one of the following four "hub" types (s):
    - L: Large hub that accounts for at least 1% of total U.S. passenger enplanements.
    - M: Medium hub that accounts for between 0.25% and 1% of total U.S. passenger enplanements.
    - S: Small hub that accounts for between 0.05% and 0.25% of total U.S. passenger enplanements.
    - N: Nonhub that accounts for less than 0.05% of total U.S. passenger enplanements, but more than 10,000 annual enplanements.
  - CS: Commercial service – nonprimary are publicly owned airports that receive scheduled passenger service and have at least 2,500 passenger boardings each year.
  - R: Reliever airports are designated by the FAA to relieve congestion at a large commercial service airport and to provide more general aviation access to the overall community.
  - GA: General aviation airports are the largest single group of airports in the U.S. airport system. They are public-use airports that do not have scheduled service or have scheduled service with less than 2,500 passenger boardings each year.
- **Enplanements** – The number of enplanements (commercial passenger boardings) that occurred at the airport in calendar year 2019, as per FAA records released October 2020.

City served	FAA	IATA	ICAO	Airport name	Role	Enplanements (2025)
				**Commercial service – primary airports**		
Allentown	ABE	ABE	KABE	**Lehigh Valley International Airport**	P-S	468,130
Altoona	AOO	AOO	KAOO	**Altoona–Blair County Airport**	P-N	10,616
Erie	ERI	ERI	KERI	**Erie International Airport**	P-N	65,380
Harrisburg	MDT	MDT	KMDT	**Harrisburg International Airport**	P-S	803,428
Johnstown	JST	JST	KJST	**John Murtha Johnstown–Cambria County Airport**	P-N	19,341
Lancaster	LNS	LNS	KLNS	**Lancaster Airport**	P-N	18,573
Latrobe	LBE	LBE	KLBE	**Arnold Palmer Regional Airport**	P-N	59,578
Philadelphia	PHL	PHL	KPHL	**Philadelphia International Airport**	P-L	12,754,034
Pittsburgh	PIT	PIT	KPIT	**Pittsburgh International Airport**	P-M	4,668,137
State College	UNV	**SCE**	KUNV	**State College Regional Airport**	P-N	147,911
Wilkes-Barre / Scranton	AVP	AVP	KAVP	**Wilkes-Barre/Scranton International Airport**	P-N	221,803
				**Commercial service – nonprimary airports**		
Bradford	BFD	BFD	KBFD	**Bradford Regional Airport**	CS	2,799
DuBois	DUJ	DUJ	KDUJ	**DuBois Regional Airport**	CS	4,255
Williamsport	IPT	IPT	KIPT	**Williamsport Regional Airport**	CS	2,015
				**Reliever airports**		
Beaver Falls	BVI	**BFP**	KBVI	Beaver County Airport	R	0
Butler	BTP	BTP	KBTP	Pittsburgh-Butler Regional Airport (K.W. Scholter Field) (was Butler County Airport)	R	22
Coatesville	MQS	**CTH**	KMQS	Chester County G. O. Carlson Airport	R	259
Doylestown	DYL	DYL	KDYL	Doylestown Airport	R	0
Harrisburg	CXY	**HAR**	KCXY	Capital City Airport	R	200
Monongahela / Belle Vernon	FWQ		KFWQ	Rostraver Airport	R	0
Philadelphia	PNE	PNE	KPNE	Northeast Philadelphia Airport	R	844
Philadelphia / Blue Bell	LOM	**BBX**	KLOM	Wings Field	R	73
Pittsburgh / West Mifflin	AGC	AGC	KAGC	Allegheny County Airport	R	319
Pottstown	PTW	PTW	KPTW	Heritage Field (was Pottstown Limerick Airport)	R	3
Toughkenamon	N57			New Garden Airport	R	0
West Chester	OQN		KOQN	Brandywine Regional Airport	R	48
				**General aviation airports**		
Allentown	XLL		KXLL	Allentown Queen City Municipal Airport	GA	2
Bedford	HMZ		KHMZ	Bedford County Airport	GA	35
Bloomsburg	N13			Bloomsburg Municipal Airport	GA	0
Chambersburg	N68			Franklin County Regional Airport (was Chambersburg Municipal)	GA	0
Clarion	AXQ		KAXQ	Clarion County Airport	GA	0
Clearfield	FIG		KFIG	Clearfield–Lawrence Airport	GA	0
Connellsville	VVS		KVVS	Joseph A. Hardy Connellsville Airport (was Connellsville Airport)	GA	0
Corry	8G2			Corry–Lawrence Airport	GA	0
Ebensburg	9G8			Ebensburg Airport	GA	0
Franklin	FKL	FKL	KFKL	Venango Regional Airport (Chess Lamberton Field)	GA	1,998
Gettysburg	W05	GTY		Gettysburg Regional Airport (was Gettysburg Airport & Travel Ctr)	GA	0
Greenville	4G1			Greenville Municipal Airport	GA	2
Grove City	29D			Grove City Airport	GA	0
Hazleton	HZL	HZL	KHZL	Hazleton Regional Airport	GA	30
Indiana	IDI	IDI	KIDI	Indiana County Airport (Jimmy Stewart Field)	GA	0
Lehighton	22N			Jake Arner Memorial Airport	GA	0
Lock Haven	LHV	LHV	KLHV	William T. Piper Memorial Airport	GA	0
Meadville	GKJ	MEJ	KGKJ	Port Meadville Airport	GA	20
Mount Pocono	MPO	MPO	KMPO	Pocono Mountains Regional Airport	GA	5
New Castle	UCP		KUCP	New Castle Municipal Airport	GA	0
Philipsburg	PSB		KPSB	Mid-State Airport (Mid-State Regional Airport)	GA	0
Pottstown	N47			Pottstown Municipal Airport	GA	0
Pottsville	ZER		KZER	Schuylkill County/Joe Zerbey Airport	GA	2
Punxsutawney	N35			Punxsutawney Municipal Airport	GA	0
Quakertown	UKT	UKT	KUKT	Quakertown Airport	GA	0
Reading	RDG	RDG	KRDG	Reading Regional Airport (Carl A. Spaatz Field)	GA	1,777
Reedsville	RVL	RED	KRVL	Mifflin County Airport	GA	35
St. Marys	OYM	STQ	KOYM	St. Marys Municipal Airport	GA	0
Selinsgrove	SEG	SEG	KSEG	Penn Valley Airport	GA	38
Shamokin / Paxinos	N79			Northumberland County Airport	GA	0
Somerset / Friedens	2G9			Somerset County Airport	GA	0
Titusville	6G1			Titusville Airport	GA	0
Towanda	N27			Bradford County Airport	GA	0
Washington	AFJ	WSG	KAFJ	Washington County Airport	GA	12
Wellsboro	N38			Grand Canyon Regional Airport (was Wellsboro Johnston Airport)	GA	0
Wilkes-Barre	WBW	WBW	KWBW	Wilkes-Barre Wyoming Valley Airport	GA	0
Zelienople	PJC		KPJC	Zelienople Municipal Airport	GA	0
				**Other public-use airports** (not listed in NPIAS)		
Bally	7N8			Butter Valley Golf Port		
Bellefonte	N96	PSB		Bellefonte Airport		
Bethel	8N1			Grimes Airport		
Brogue	9W8			Baublitz Commercial Airport (was Baublitz Airport)		
Butler	3G9			Butler Farm Show Airport		
Canadensis	8N4			Flying Dollar Airport		3
Carlisle	N94			Carlisle Airport		5
Centre Hall	N74			Penns Cave Airport		
Centre Hall	N16			Centre Airpark		
Cresco	48P			Rocky Hill Ultralight Flightpark (was BBI Ultralight Flightpark)		
Danville	8N8			Danville Airport		
Dover	0P8			Lazy B Ranch Airport (formerly private-use, FAA: PS08)		
East Stroudsburg	N53			Stroudsburg–Pocono Airport	~~GA~~	
Easton	N43			Braden Airpark		3
Eighty Four	22D			Bandel Airport		
Erwinna	9N1			Van Sant Airport (Vansant Airport)		
Essington	9N2	PSQ		Philadelphia Seaplane Base		
Factoryville	9N3			Seamans Field		
Fairfield	W73			Mid Atlantic Soaring Center		
Finleyville	G05			Finleyville Airpark		
Fredericksburg	9N7			Farmers Pride Airport		
Freeport	6P7			McVille Airport		
Germansville	P91			Flying M Aerodrome		
Honesdale	N30			Cherry Ridge Airport	~~GA~~	
Irwin / McKeesport	31D			Inter County Airport		
Jeannette	5G8			Greensburg Jeannette Regional Airport	~~GA~~	
Jersey Shore	P96			Jersey Shore Airport		
Kralltown	07N			Bermudian Valley Airpark		
Lebanon	08N			Keller Brothers Airport		
Lehighton	14N			Beltzville Airport		
Mifflintown	P34			Mifflintown Airport		
Morgantown	O03			Morgantown Airport		
Mount Pleasant	P45			Mount Pleasant/Scottdale Airport	~~GA~~	
Mount Joy / Marietta	N71			Donegal Springs Airpark		
Myerstown	9D4			Deck Airport		
Palmyra	58N			Reigle Field (Reigle Airport)		
Perkasie	CKZ		KCKZ	Pennridge Airport		53
Philipsburg	1N3			Albert Airport		
Pittsburgh / Tarentum	9G1			Pittsburgh Northeast Airport	~~GA~~	
Pittsfield	P15			Brokenstraw Airport		
Slatington	69N			Slatington Airport		
Smoketown	S37			Smoketown Airport		
Sterling	70N			Spring Hill Airport		
Stewartstown	0P2			Shoestring Aviation Airfield (Shoestring Aviation Airport)		
Sunbury	71N			Sunbury Airport		
Sunbury	H11			Sunbury Seaplane Base		
Tower City	74N			Bendigo Airport		
Tunkhannock	76N			Skyhaven Airport		
Unionville / Julian	79N			Ridge Soaring Gliderport		
Waynesburg	WAY	WAY	KWAY	Greene County Airport	~~GA~~	
Wellsville	2N5			Kampel Airport		
Williamsburg	6G6			Cove Valley Airport		
York / Thomasville	THV	THV	KTHV	York Airport	~~GA~~	25
				**Other military airports**		
Fort Indiantown Gap	MUI	MUI	KMUI	Muir Army Airfield		
Willow Grove	~~NXX~~	~~NXX~~	~~KNXX~~	NAS JRB Willow Grove (closed 2011)		
				**Notable private-use airports**		
Annville	4PA0			Millard Airport (formerly public-use, FAA: N76)		
Breinigsville	29PA			Gardner Airport		
Collegeville	32PA			Perkiomen Valley Airport	~~GA~~	
Eagles Mere	4PN7			Merritt Field		
Mars	68PS			Lakehill Heliport		
Monroeville	15PA			Pittsburgh–Monroeville Airport		
Newry	7PN4			Blue Knob Valley Airport		
				**Notable former airports**		
Burgettstown	~~P64~~			Miller Airport (closed 2004?)		
Columbia	~~8N7~~			McGinness Airport (McGinness Field) (closed 2014)		
East Stroudsburg / Tannersville		~~ESP~~		Birchwood–Pocono Airport (closed)		
Galeton	~~5G6~~			Cherry Springs Airport (closed 2007)		
Gettysburg				Battlefield Airport (closed 1920's?)		
Gettysburg				Gettysburg Airport (was Forney Airfield, closing date unclear)		
Hanover	~~6W6~~			Hanover Airport		
Harrisburg				Olmsted Air Force Base (closed 1969)		
Hershey				Hershey Airpark (closed 1981)		
Indian Lake	~~5G2~~			Indian Lake Airport (closed 1999)		
Kutztown				Kutztown Airport (closed 2009)		
Montrose	~~P32~~			Husky Haven Airport (formerly private-use, FAA: PA52)		
Morris	~~PN0~~			Echo Airport (closed)		
Mount Union			~~KMUU~~	Huntingdon County Airport (closed)		
Seven Springs / Champion	~~7SP~~			Seven Springs Airport		
Shippensburg	~~N42~~			Shippensburg Airport (closed 2017)		
State College	~~SCE~~			State College Air Depot (closed 1986–1994?)		
Tannersville				Birchwood-Pocono Airpark (closed 1996)		
Valencia				Glade Mill Airport (closed)		
Warminster	~~NJP~~		~~KNJP~~	NAWC Warminster (closed 1996)		
Wattsburg	~~3G1~~			Erie County Airport (closed 2011?)		
West Mifflin				Bettis Field (closed 1940/50's?)		

== See also ==
- Essential Air Service
- Pennsylvania World War II Army Airfields
- Susquehanna Area Regional Airport Authority (SARAA), governing authority of four airports in south-central Pennsylvania.
- Wikipedia:WikiProject Aviation/Airline destination lists: North America#Pennsylvania
