= P45 =

P45 may refer to:

== Vessels ==
- ARA Robinson (P-45), a corvette of the Argentine Navy
- HMS Unrivalled (P45), a submarine of the Royal Navy
- Spanish patrol vessel Audaz (P-45)

== Other uses ==
- P45 (tax), a form designation used as a metonym for termination of employment
- Bell P-45, an American fighter aircraft later redesignated P-39C
- Intel P45, a computer chipset
- Mount Pleasant/Scottdale Airport, in Fayette County, Pennsylvania, United States
- P45 road (Ukraine)
- Papyrus 45, a biblical manuscript
- Pneumonoultramicroscopicsilicovolcanoconiosis, a synonym for the disease known as silicosis
- P45, a state regional road in Latvia
- P45, a digital camera back made by Phase One
- The Clarkson P45, a hybrid microcar made by Jeremy Clarkson on Top Gear
- "P.45", a song by Gorillaz and Spacemonkeyz from Laika Come Home

== See also ==
- Ferrari P4/5 by Pininfarina, an Italian sports car
