= N76 =

N76 may refer to:

- HMS Tribune (N76), a submarine of the Royal Navy
- Makilala–Allah Valley Road, in the Philippines
- Millard Airport (Pennsylvania), in Lebanon County, Pennsylvania, United States
- N76 road (Ireland)
- Nokia N76, a mobile phone
