= Bendigo Airport =

Bendigo Airport may refer to:

- Bendigo Airport (Victoria) in Bendigo, Victoria, Australia
- Bendigo Airport (Pennsylvania) in Tower City, Pennsylvania, United States
