= N79 =

N79 may refer to:

== Roads ==
- Route nationale 79, in France
- N79 highway, in the Philippines
- Nebraska Highway 79, in the United States

== Other uses ==
- N79 (Long Island bus)
- HMS Torbay (N79), a submarine of the Royal Navy
- Northumberland County Airport, in Pennsylvania, United States
- Nokia N79, a smartphone
- N79 (star cluster), a star cluster in the Large Magellanic Cloud
