= Millard Airport =

Millard Airport may refer to:

- Millard Airport (Nebraska) in Omaha, Nebraska, United States (FAA: MLE)
- Millard Airport (Pennsylvania) in Annville, Pennsylvania, United States (FAA: 4PA0, formerly N76)
