= N35 =

N35 may refer to:

- N35 (Long Island bus)
- Acer N35, a PDA
- Beechcraft N35 Bonanza, an American civil utility aircraft
- French submarine N35, a German submarine surrendered to France after the Second World War
- HMS Olympus (N35), a submarine of the Royal Navy
- Karakoram Highway, in Pakistan
- London Buses route N35
- Nebraska Highway 35, in the United States
- Punxsutawney Municipal Airport, in Pennsylvania, United States
