= N53 =

N53 may refer to:

== Roads ==
- N53 road (Ireland), a road in the Republic of Ireland split by the border with Northern Ireland
- Nebraska Highway 53, in the United States
- Santiago–Tuguegarao Bypass Road, in the Philippines

== Other uses ==
- N53 (Long Island bus)
- BMW N53, an automobile engine
- HMS Triad (N53), a submarine of the Royal Navy
- HNoMS Vale (N53), a minelayer of the Royal Norwegian Navy
- London Buses route N53
- Stroudsburg–Pocono Airport, in Monroe County, Pennsylvania, United States
