= N30 =

N30 may refer to:

== Roads ==
- N30 road (Belgium), a National Road in Belgium
- Route nationale 30, in France
- N30 road (Ireland)
- N-30 National Highway, in Pakistan

== Other uses ==
- 1999 Seattle WTO protests, a series of protests surrounding the WTO Ministerial Conference of 1999
- Acer N30, a PDA
- Catalog of 5,268 Standard Stars Based on the Normal System N30, a star catalogue
- Cherry Ridge Airport, serving Honesdale, Pennsylvania, United States
- Cystitis
- Net 30, a form of trade credit
- Newport 30, an American sailboat
- Toyota Hilux (N30), a Japanese pickup truck
- "N30", a song by Avail, from their 2000 album One Wrench
