= N27 =

N27 may refer to:

== Roads ==
- Route nationale 27, in France
- N27 road (Ireland)
- Nebraska Highway 27, in the United States

== Other uses ==
- N27 (Long Island bus)
- Akhet (hieroglyph)
- Bradford County Airport, in Bradford County, Pennsylvania, United States
- Kadoma-minami Station, of the Osaka Metro
- London Buses route N27
- Nieuport 27, a French First World War fighter aircraft
