= N38 =

N38 may refer to:

- Escadrille N.38, a unit of the French Air Force
- HMS Taku (N38), a submarine of the Royal Navy
- London Buses route N38
- Nebraska Highway 38, in the United States
- Negeri Sembilan State Route N38, in Malaysia
- Northrop N-38, an American prototype aircraft
- Wellsboro Johnston Airport, serving Wellsboro, Pennsylvania, United States
- N38 road (Belgium), a road in Belgium
