= Titusville Airport (disambiguation) =

Titusville Airport may refer to:

- Titusville Airport in Titusville, Pennsylvania, United States (FAA: 6G1)
- Space Coast Regional Airport in Titusville, Florida, United States (FAA/IATA: TIX)
- Arthur Dunn Airpark in Titusville, Florida, United States (FAA: X21)
