= McVille Airport =

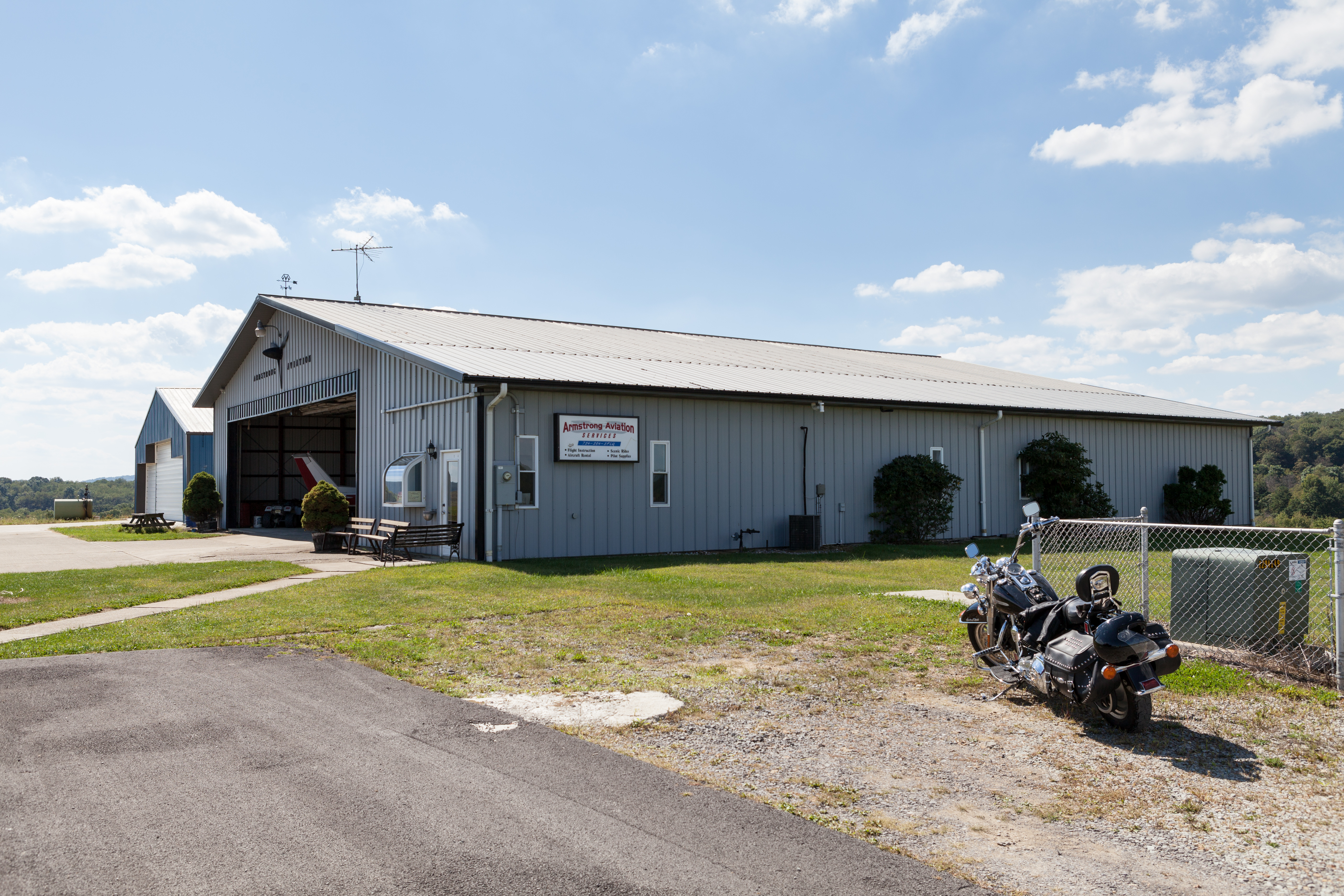
- Hangars in September 2015
- IATA: none; ICAO: none; FAA LID: 6P7

Summary
- Airport type: Public
- Owner: Theodore & Thomas Kijowski
- Serves: Freeport, Pennsylvania
- Elevation AMSL: 1,090 ft / 332 m
- Coordinates: 40°44′00″N 079°35′59″W

Maps
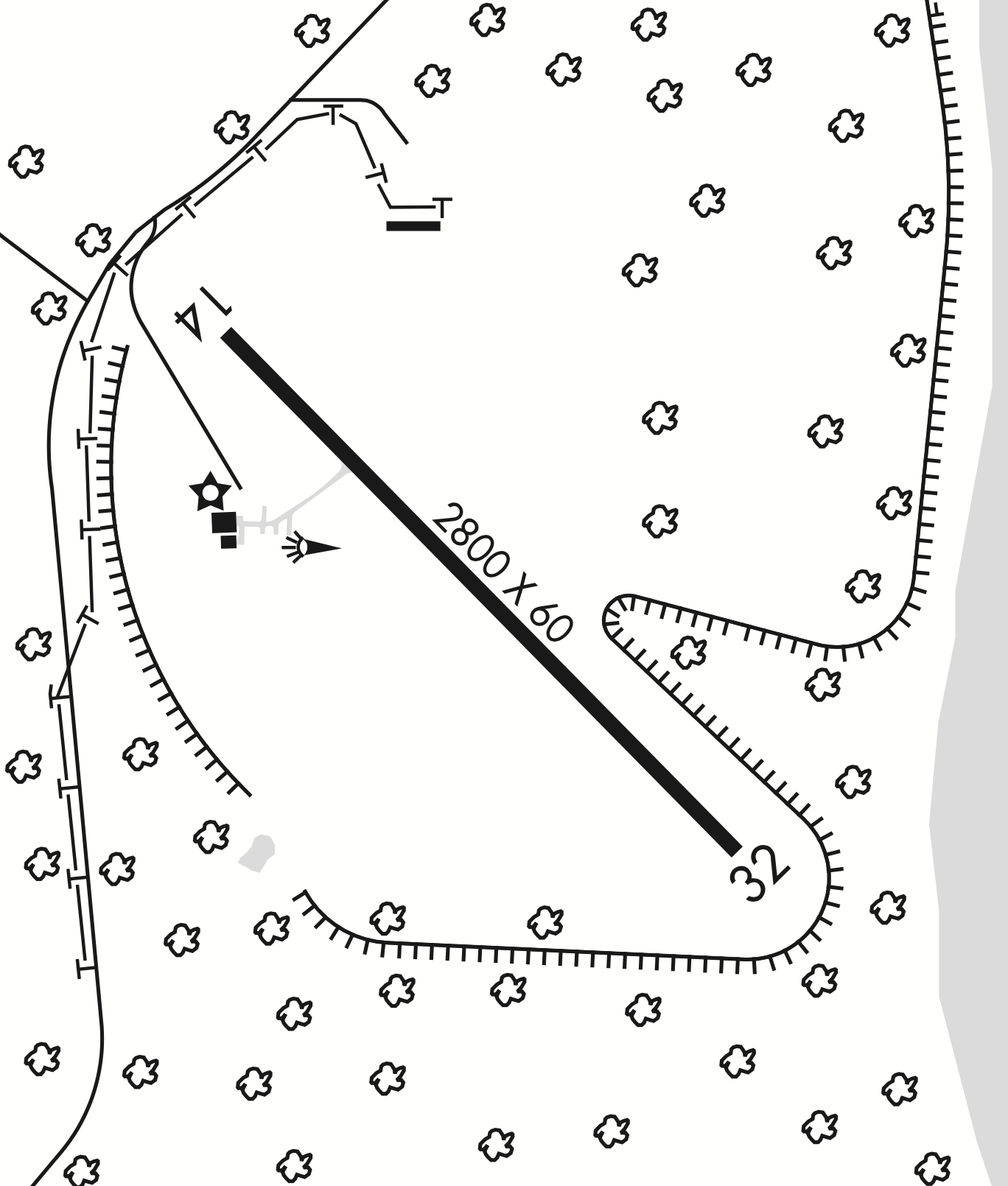

- Location of airport in Pennsylvania 6P7 (the United States)

Runways
Direction	Length		Surface
Direction	ft	m	Surface
14/32	2,800	854	Asphalt

Statistics (2007)
- Aircraft operations: 11,010
- Based aircraft: 56
- Source: Federal Aviation Administration

McVille Airport (FAA LID: 6P7) is a privately owned, public use airport located six nautical miles (11 km) northeast of the central business district of Freeport, a borough in Armstrong County, Pennsylvania, United States.

== Facilities and aircraft ==
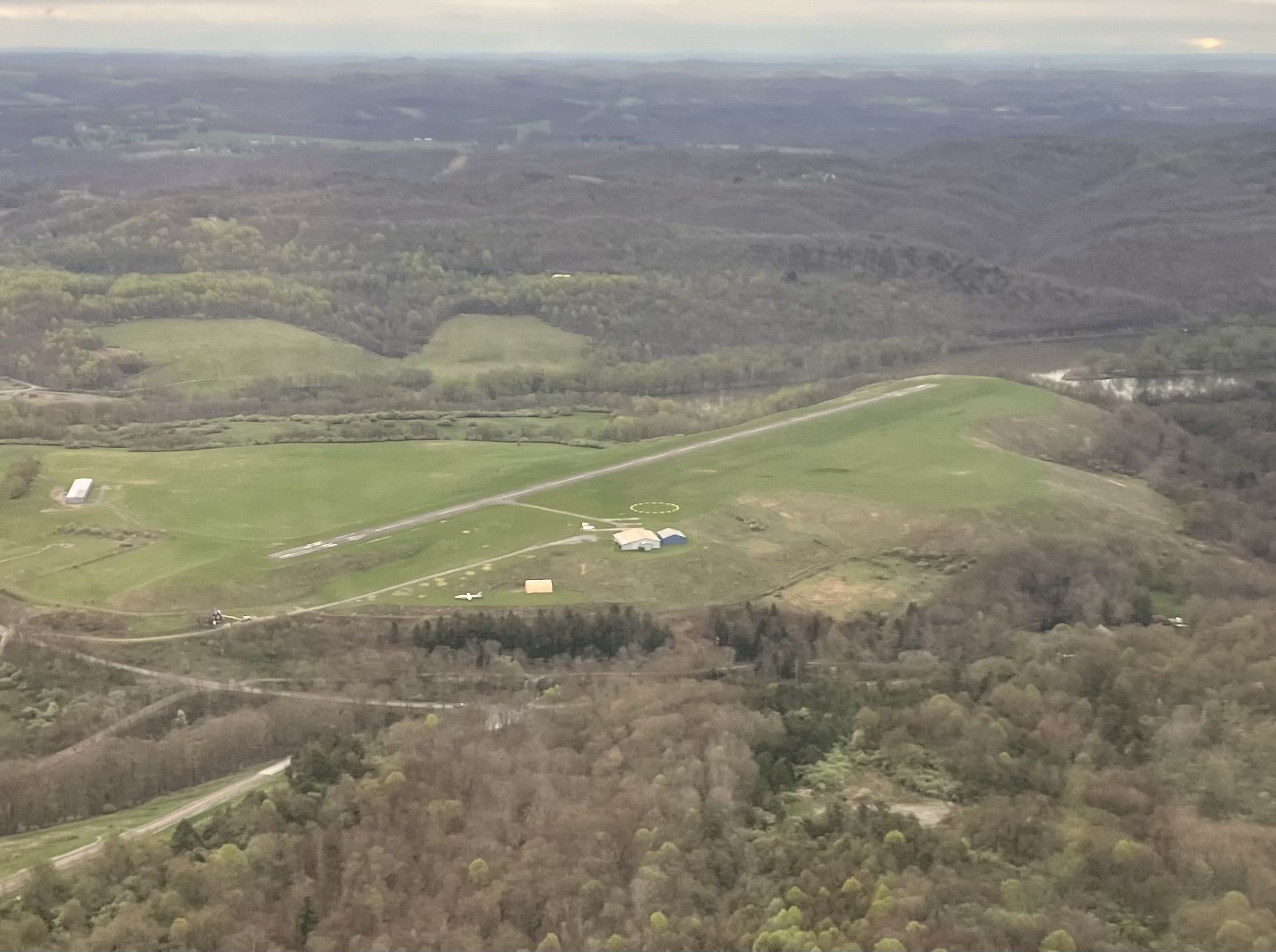
Aerial photograph of the airport at 1000ft above the ground

McVille Airport covers an area of 100 acres (40 ha) at an elevation of 1,090 feet (332 m) above mean sea level. It has one runway with asphalt surface: 14/32 is 2,800 by 60 feet (854 x 18 m).

For the 12-month period ending April 30, 2007, the airport had 11,010 aircraft operations, an average of 30 per day: 99.9% general aviation and 0.1% military. At that time there were 56 aircraft based at this airport: 95% single-engine, 4% multi-engine and 2% ultralight.

== See also ==
- List of airports in Pennsylvania
