= Clearfield–Lawrence Airport =

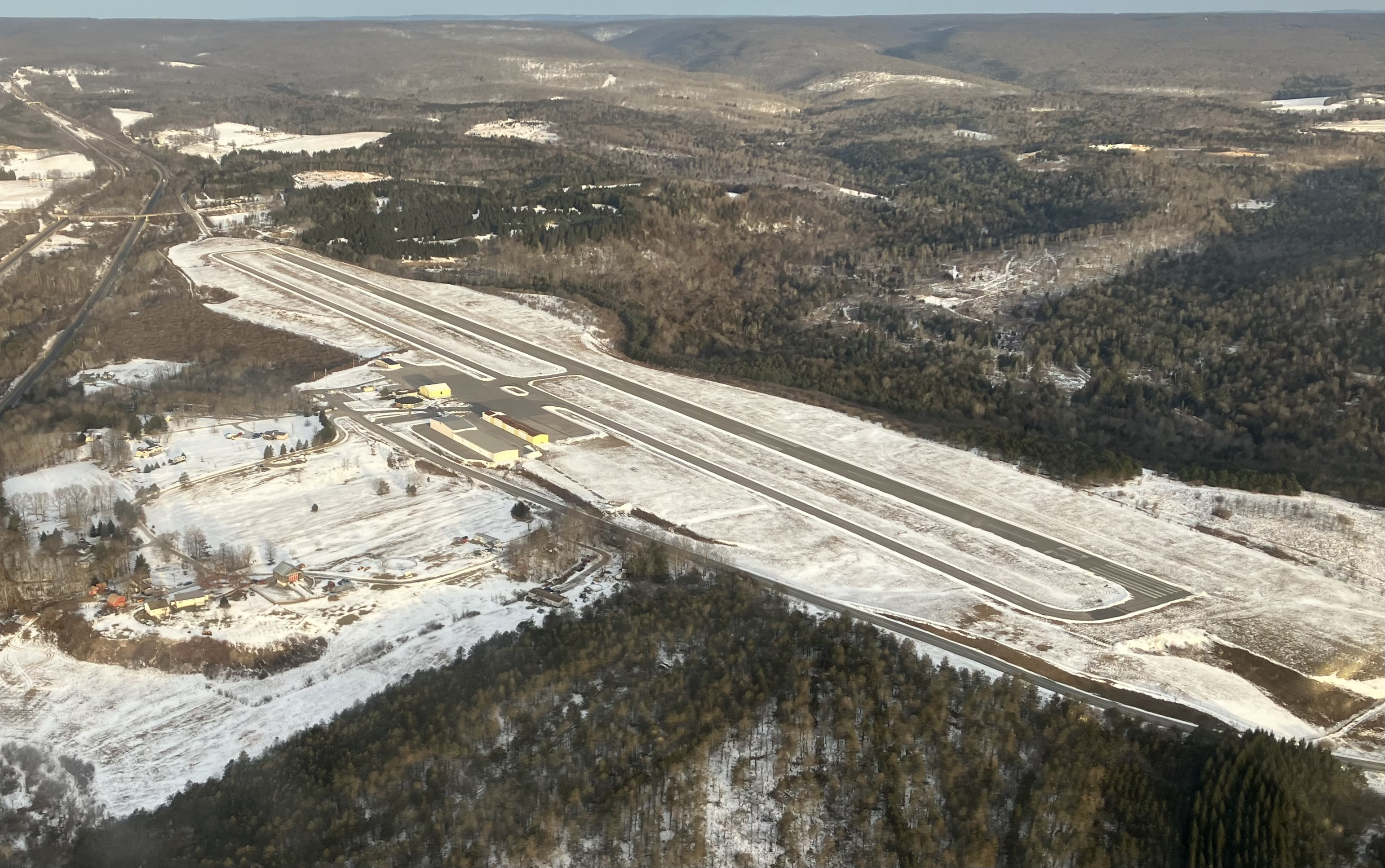
- IATA: none; ICAO: KFIG; FAA LID: FIG

Summary
- Airport type: Public
- Owner: Clearfield–Lawrence Airport Authority
- Serves: Clearfield / Lawrence Township
- Location: Clearfield County, Pennsylvania
- Elevation AMSL: 1,516 ft (462 m)
- Coordinates: 41°02′57″N 078°24′55″W

Map
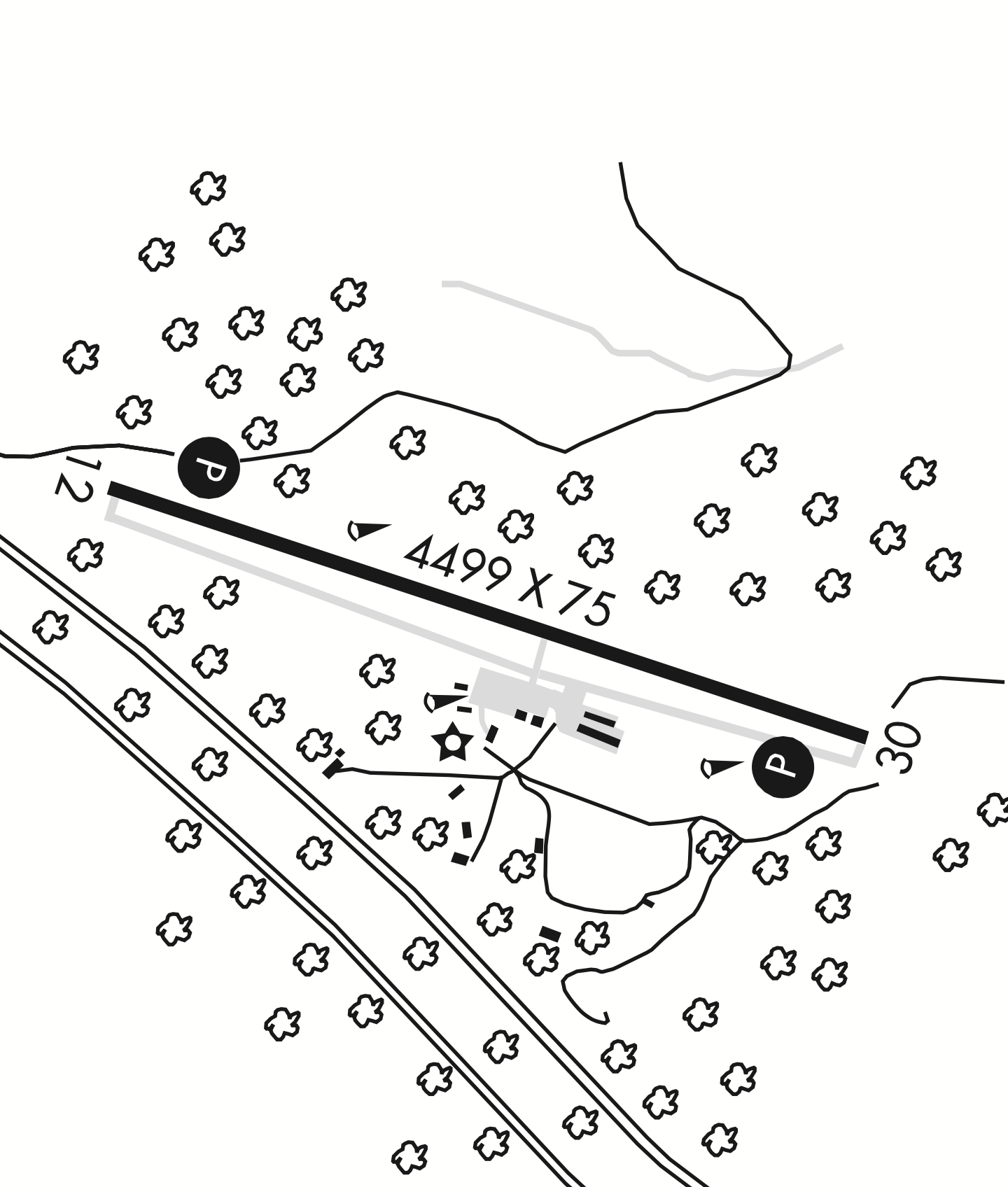

Runways
Direction	Length		Surface
Direction	ft	m	Surface
12/30	4,499	1,371	Asphalt

Statistics (2023)
- Aircraft operations (year ending 6/6/2023): 9,600
- Based aircraft: 17
- Source: Federal Aviation Administration

Clearfield–Lawrence Airport (ICAO: KFIG, FAA LID: FIG) is a public use airport located two nautical miles (2.3 mi, 3.7 km) northeast of the central business district of Clearfield, a borough in Clearfield County, Pennsylvania, United States. It is owned by the Clearfield–Lawrence Airport Authority.

The area offers fishing, hunting, camping, boating, and PennState Athletics. The airport is open from 8:00am–5:00pm daily and is closed Christmas Day. The airport is located at 801 Airport Rd. 1,516 ft (462 m) above sea level. The airport has one runway measuring 4,499 x 75 ft and the asphalt is listed in good condition. The terminal has a pilot's lounge with a weather computer, a conference room, and a coffee shop. Car rental is provided by Enterprise Rent-a-car.

Although most U.S. airports use the same three-letter location identifier for the FAA and IATA, this airport is assigned FIG by the FAA but has no designation from the IATA (which assigned FIG to Fria Airport in Guinea). Prior to October 8, 1998, the airport used the identifier N97.

== Facilities and aircraft ==
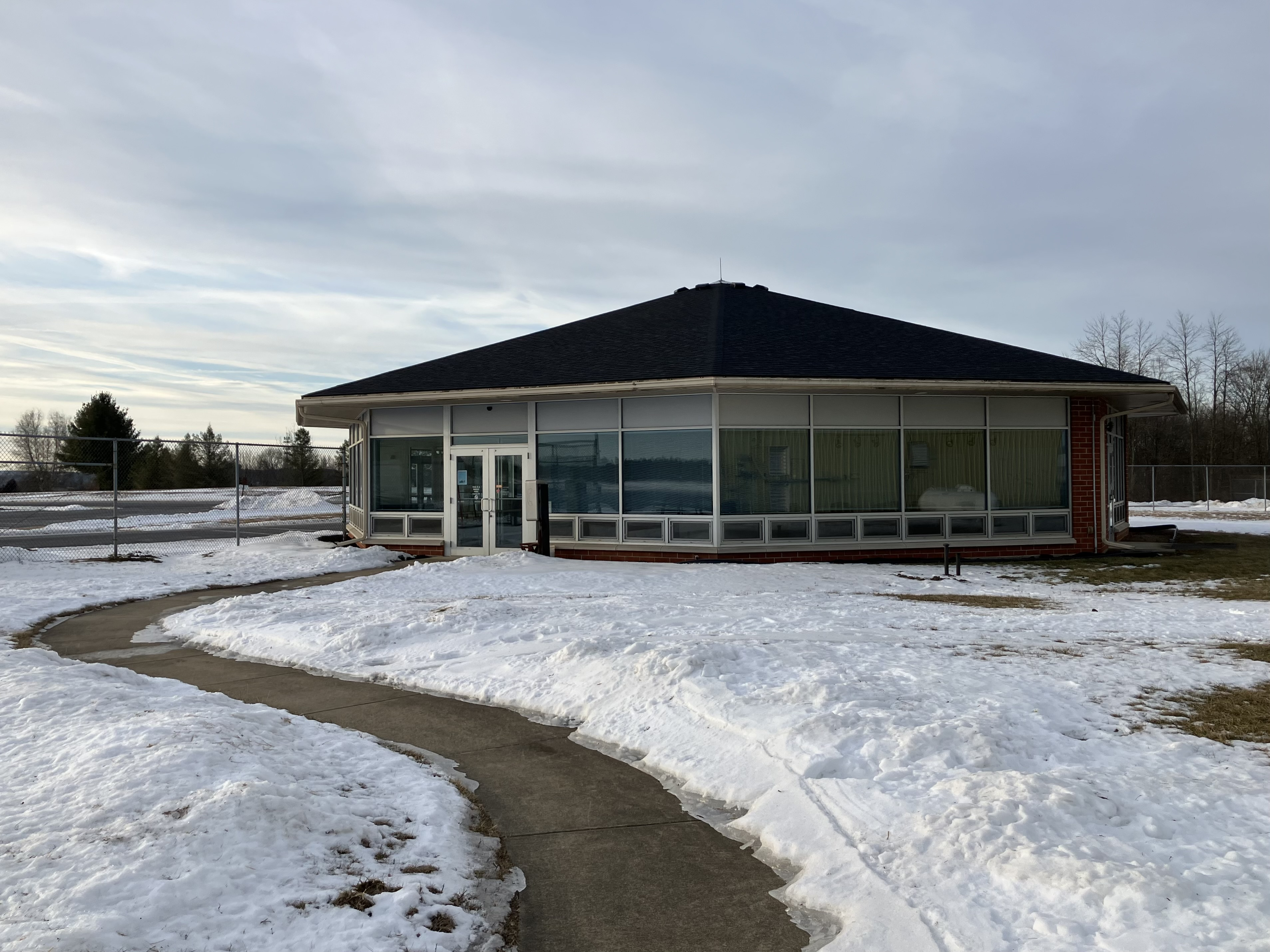
Pilot's lounge

Clearfield–Lawrence Airport covers an area of 140 acres (57 ha) at an elevation of 1,516 feet (462 m) above mean sea level. It has one runway designated 12/30 with an asphalt surface measuring 4,499 by 75 feet (1,371 x 23 m).

For the 12-month period ending June 6, 2023, the airport had 9,600 aircraft operations, an average of 26 per day: 99% general aviation and 1% military. At that time there were 17 aircraft based at this airport: 15 single-engine, 1 multi-engine, and 1 helicopter.

== See also ==
- List of airports in Pennsylvania
