= Schuylkill County Airport =

Airport in Pennsylvania, United States

Schuylkill County Airport Schuylkill County Joe Zerbey Airport
- IATA: none; ICAO: KZER; FAA LID: ZER

Summary
- Airport type: Public
- Owner: Schuylkill County Airport Authority
- Serves: Pottsville, Pennsylvania
- Elevation AMSL: 1,729 ft (527 m)
- Coordinates: 40°42′23″N 076°22′23″W

Map
- Location of airport in Pennsylvania ZER (the United States)

Runways
Direction	Length		Surface
Direction	ft	m	Surface
11/29	5,101	1,555	Asphalt
4/22	2,270	692	Turf

Statistics (2011)
- Aircraft operations: 28,100
- Based aircraft: 25
- Source: Federal Aviation Administration

Schuylkill County Airport (ICAO: KZER, FAA LID: ZER), also known as Schuylkill County Joe Zerbey Airport, is a public use airport located eight nautical miles (9 mi, 15 km) west of the central business district of Pottsville, a city in Schuylkill County, Pennsylvania, United States. It is owned by the Schuylkill County Airport Authority. This airport is included in the National Plan of Integrated Airport Systems for 2011–2015, which categorized it as a general aviation facility.

Although most U.S. airports use the same three-letter location identifier for the FAA and IATA, this airport is assigned ZER by the FAA but has no designation from the IATA (which assigned ZER to Zero Airport in Zero, Arunachal Pradesh, India). The airport's ICAO identifier is KZER.

== Facilities and aircraft ==
The airport covers an area of 34 acres (14 ha) at an elevation of 1,729 feet (527 m) above mean sea level. It has two runways: 11/29 is 5,101 by 75 feet (1,555 x 23 m) with an asphalt surface; 4/22 is 2,270 by 140 feet (692 x 43 m) with a turf surface.

For the 12-month period ending August 10, 2011, the airport had 28,100 aircraft operations, an average of 76 per day: 75% general aviation, 22% military, and 2% air taxi. At that time there were 25 aircraft based at this airport: 68% of these were single-engine aircraft, 20% multi-engine, 4% jet, and 8% helicopters.

== Charter service ==
- University MedEvac

== See also ==
- List of airports in Pennsylvania
