= Farmers Pride Airport =

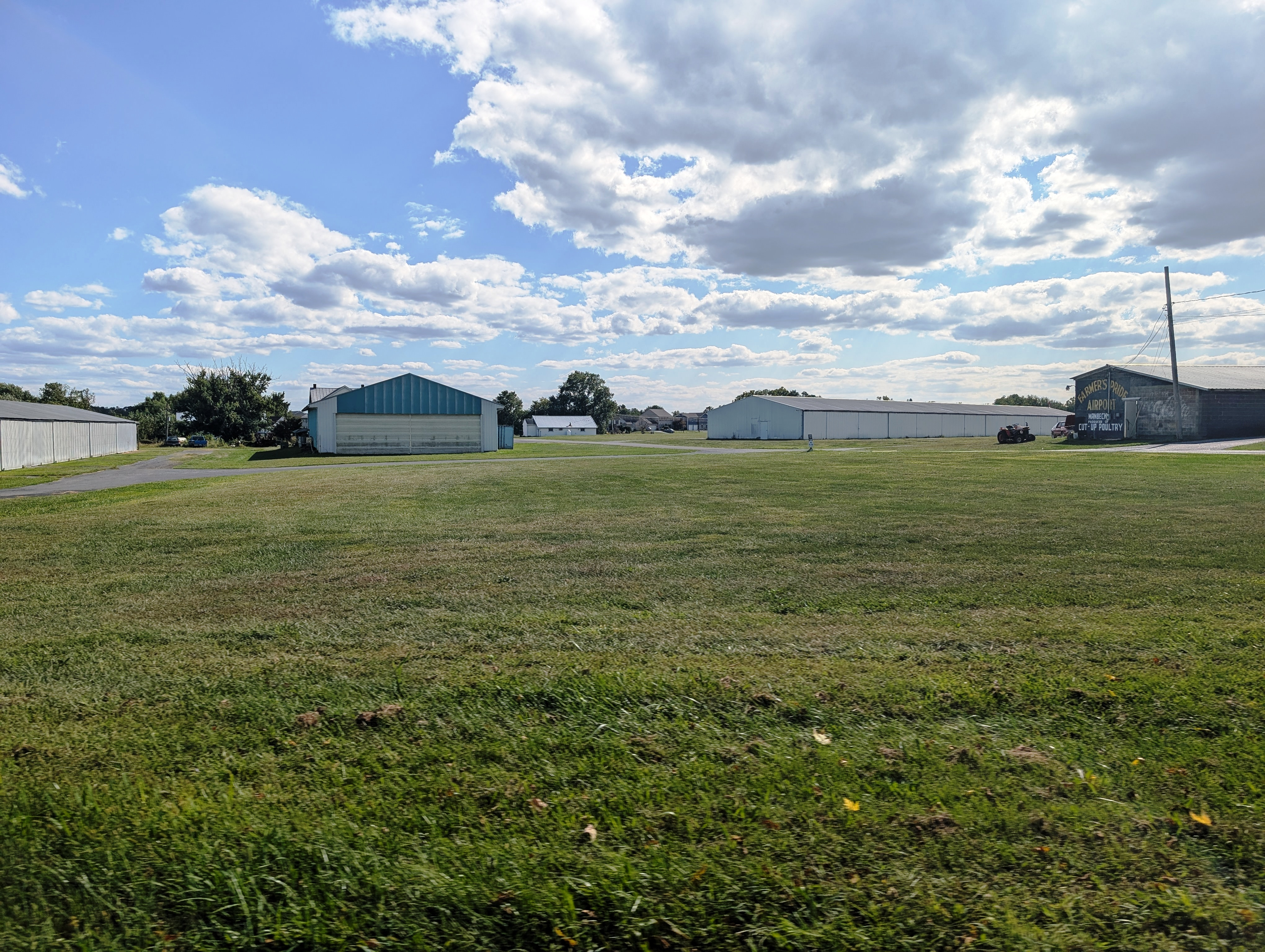
- Hangars and buildings at the airport
- IATA: none; ICAO: none; FAA LID: 9N7

Summary
- Airport type: Public-use, privately owned
- Location: Fredericksburg, Pennsylvania
- Elevation AMSL: 500 ft / 150.9 m
- Coordinates: 40°26′34.33″N 076°26′29.86″W

Map
- Location of airport in Pennsylvania 9N7 (the United States)

Runways
| Direction | Length | | Surface |
| Direction | ft | m | Surface |
|---|---|---|---|
| 10/28 | 3,410 | 1,039 | Turf |

Farmers Pride Airport (FAA LID: 9N7) is a privately owned, public-use airport in Fredericksburg, Lebanon County, Pennsylvania. The airport was opened in November 1947.

It has a 3,410 unrolled, grass runway numbered 28–10, and avgas for transient aircraft is only available in emergencies. There are approximately 50 aircraft hangared at Farmers Pride.

The airport elevation is 500 ft MSL, and the air traffic pattern is left hand only at 1500 MSL, from both runways. Runway 28's pattern overflies Northern Lebanon High School, and Runway 10's pattern overflies Interstate 78.

The airport has tie down spots for transient aircraft, and hangars for permanent aircraft located at the field.

== See also ==
- List of airports in Pennsylvania
