= Corry–Lawrence Airport =

Airport in Pennsylvania, United States

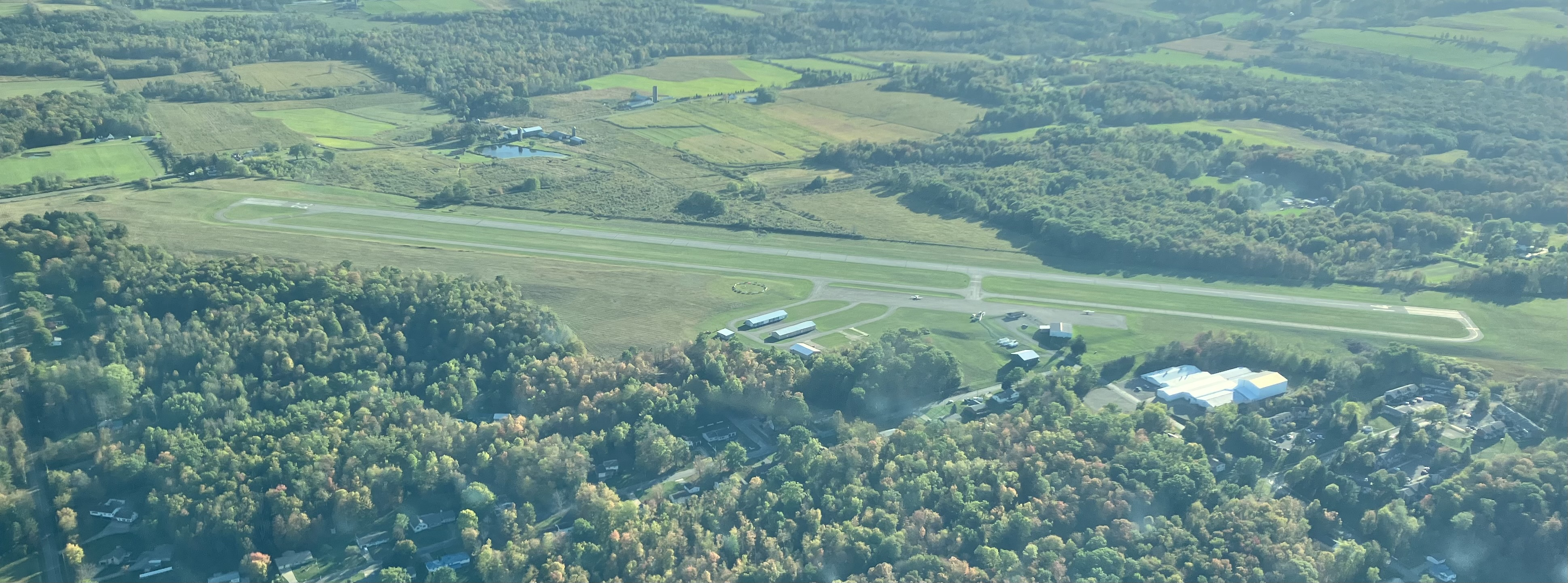
- IATA: none; ICAO: none; FAA LID: 8G2

Summary
- Airport type: Public
- Owner: Airport Authority City of Corry
- Serves: Corry, Pennsylvania
- Elevation AMSL: 1,766 ft (538 m)
- Coordinates: 41°54′27″N 079°38′28″W

Maps
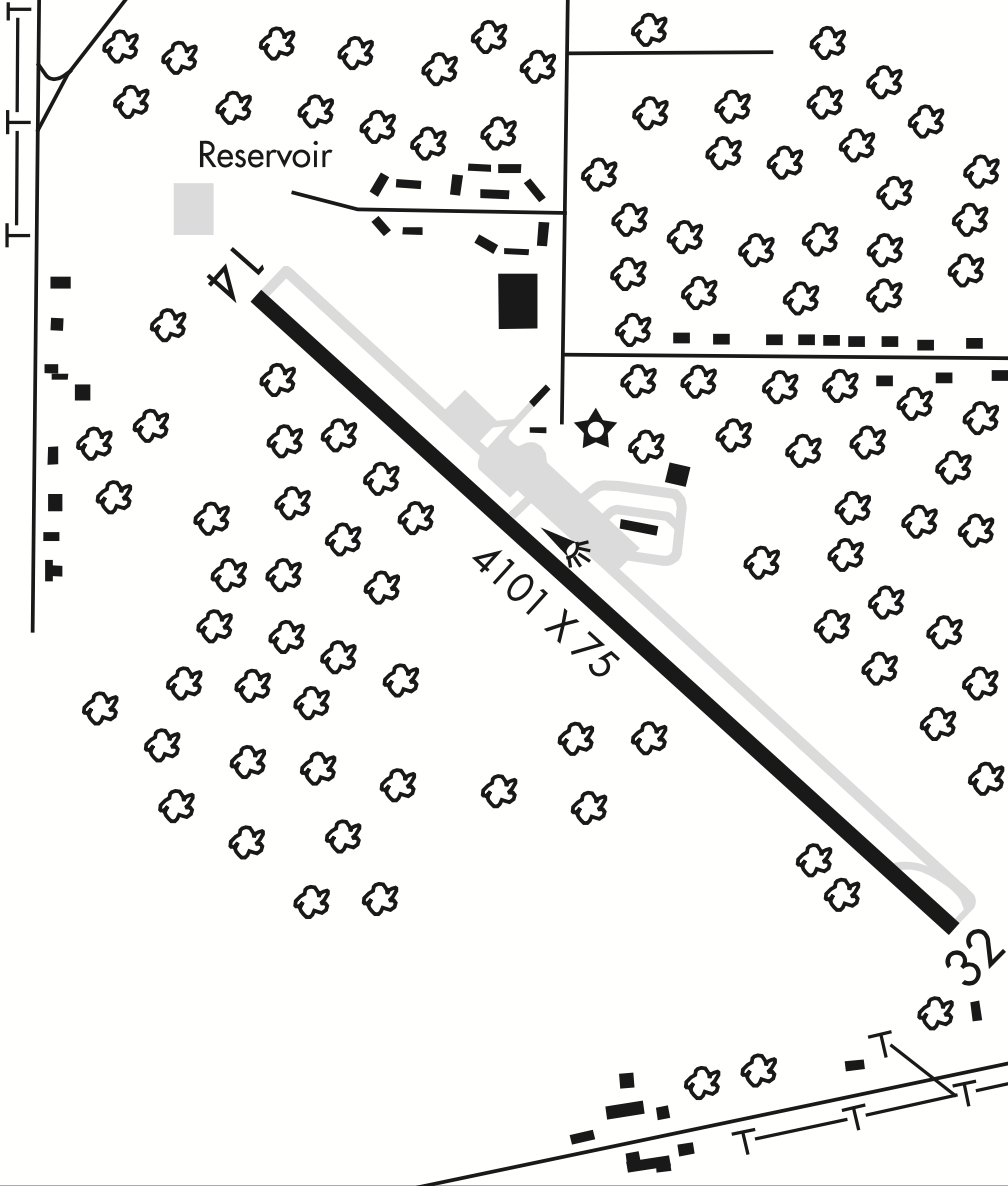
- FAA airport sketch

- Location of airport in Pennsylvania 8G2 (the United States)

Runways
Direction	Length		Surface
Direction	ft	m	Surface
14/32	4,101	1,250	Asphalt

Statistics (2020)
- Aircraft operations (year ending 10/2/2020): 586
- Based aircraft: 13
- Source: Federal Aviation Administration

Corry–Lawrence Airport (FAA LID: 8G2) is a public use airport located one nautical mile (2 km) south of the central business district of Corry, a city in Erie County, Pennsylvania, United States. It is owned by the Airport Authority City of Corry, also known as the Corry Lawrence Airport Authority. This airport is included in the National Plan of Integrated Airport Systems for 2011–2015, which categorized it as a general aviation facility.

== Facilities and aircraft ==
Corry–Lawrence Airport covers an area of 69 acres (28 ha) at an elevation of 1,766 feet (538 m) above mean sea level. It has one runway designated 14/32 with an asphalt surface measuring 4,101 by 75 feet (1,250 x 23 m).

For the 12-month period ending October 2, 2020, the airport had 586 aircraft operations, an average of 49 per month: 97% general aviation and 3% military. At that time there were 13 aircraft based at this airport: 11 single-engine, and 2 multi-engine.

== See also ==
- List of airports in Pennsylvania
