= Deck Airport =

- IATA: none; ICAO: none; FAA LID: 9D4

Summary
- Airport type: Public-use, privately owned
- Owner: Clyde Deck
- Location: Myerstown, Pennsylvania
- Elevation AMSL: 523 ft / 159.4 m
- Coordinates: 40°21′07.66″N 076°19′46.72″W
- Website: http://www.deckairport.com/

Map
- Location of airport in Pennsylvania 9D4 (the United States)

Runways
Direction	Length		Surface
Direction	ft	m	Surface
1/19	3,786	1,154	Asphalt

Deck Airport (FAA LID: 9D4) is a privately owned, public-use airport 1 mile (1.6 km) southwest of Myerstown, in Lebanon County, Pennsylvania. It was founded in March 1990 by Clyde Deck, who continues to manage the airport today. The airport has a 3,786-foot runway and offers services such as flight training, on-site aircraft maintenance, and hangar space with about 60 T-hangars in use.

== See also ==
- List of airports in Pennsylvania
