= Clarion County Airport =

Airport in Pennsylvania, United States

- IATA: none; ICAO: KAXQ; FAA LID: AXQ

Summary
- Airport type: Public
- Owner: Clarion County Airport Authority
- Serves: Clarion, Pennsylvania
- Elevation AMSL: 1,458 ft (444 m)
- Coordinates: 41°13′30″N 079°26′32″W
- Website: ClarionAirport.com
- Interactive map of Clarion County Airport

Runways
Direction	Length		Surface
Direction	ft	m	Surface
6/24	5,003	1,525	Asphalt

Statistics (2020)
- Aircraft operations (year ending 9/2/2020): 2,776
- Based aircraft: 14
- Source: Federal Aviation Administration

Clarion County Airport (ICAO: KAXQ, FAA LID: AXQ) is a public airport three miles northwest of Clarion, a borough in Clarion County, Pennsylvania. It is owned by the Clarion County Airport Authority.

The airport is on the Detroit Sectional chart. Fuel is provided by airBP; facilities include parking, hangars, passenger terminal and lounge, flight school, aircraft rentals, pilot supplies, telephone, wi-fi, a snooze room, and restrooms.

Most U.S. airports use the same three-letter location identifier for the FAA and IATA, but this airport is AXQ to the FAA and has no IATA code.

== Facilities ==
The airport covers 219 acres (89 ha) at an elevation of 1,458 feet (444 m). Its one runway, 6/24, is 5,003 by 75 feet (1,525 x 23 m) asphalt.

In the year ending September 2, 2020, the airport had 2,776 aircraft operations, average 53 per week: 99% general aviation, and 1% military. 14 aircraft were then based at the airport: 12 single-engine, and 2 helicopter.

== See also ==
- List of airports in Pennsylvania
