= Butter Valley Golf Port =

- IATA: none; ICAO: none; FAA LID: 7N8

Summary
- Airport type: Public
- Owner/Operator: John L. Gehman
- Location: Bally, Pennsylvania
- Elevation AMSL: 500 ft (150 m)
- Coordinates: 40°23′53″N 075°33′52″W
- Website: buttervalley.com/airport.htm

Map
- Location of airport in Pennsylvania 7N8 (the United States)

Runways
Direction	Length		Surface
Direction	ft	m	Surface
16/34	2,420	738	Asphalt/Turf

Statistics (2010)
- Aircraft operations: 3,500
- Based aircraft: 16
- Source: FAA and airport web site

Butter Valley Golf Port (FAA LID: 7N8) is a golf course with a privately owned, public-use airport located on the Butter Valley Golf Port golf course, located one nautical mile (1.85 km) east of the borough of Bally in Montgomery County, Pennsylvania, United States.

== Facilities and aircraft ==
Butter Valley Golf Port covers an area of 10 acres (4.0 ha) at an elevation of 500 feet above mean sea level. It has one runway designated 16/34 with a turf surface measuring 2,420 feet (740 m) x 85 feet (26 m) which includes an asphalt insert that is 1,535 feet (468 m) long and 25 feet (6 m) wide.

For the 12-month period ending April 16, 2010, the airport had 3,500 general aviation aircraft operations, an average of 10 per day. There are 16 aircraft based at this airport: 94% single-engine and 6% multi-engine.

== See also ==
- List of airports in Pennsylvania
