= Somerset County Airport =

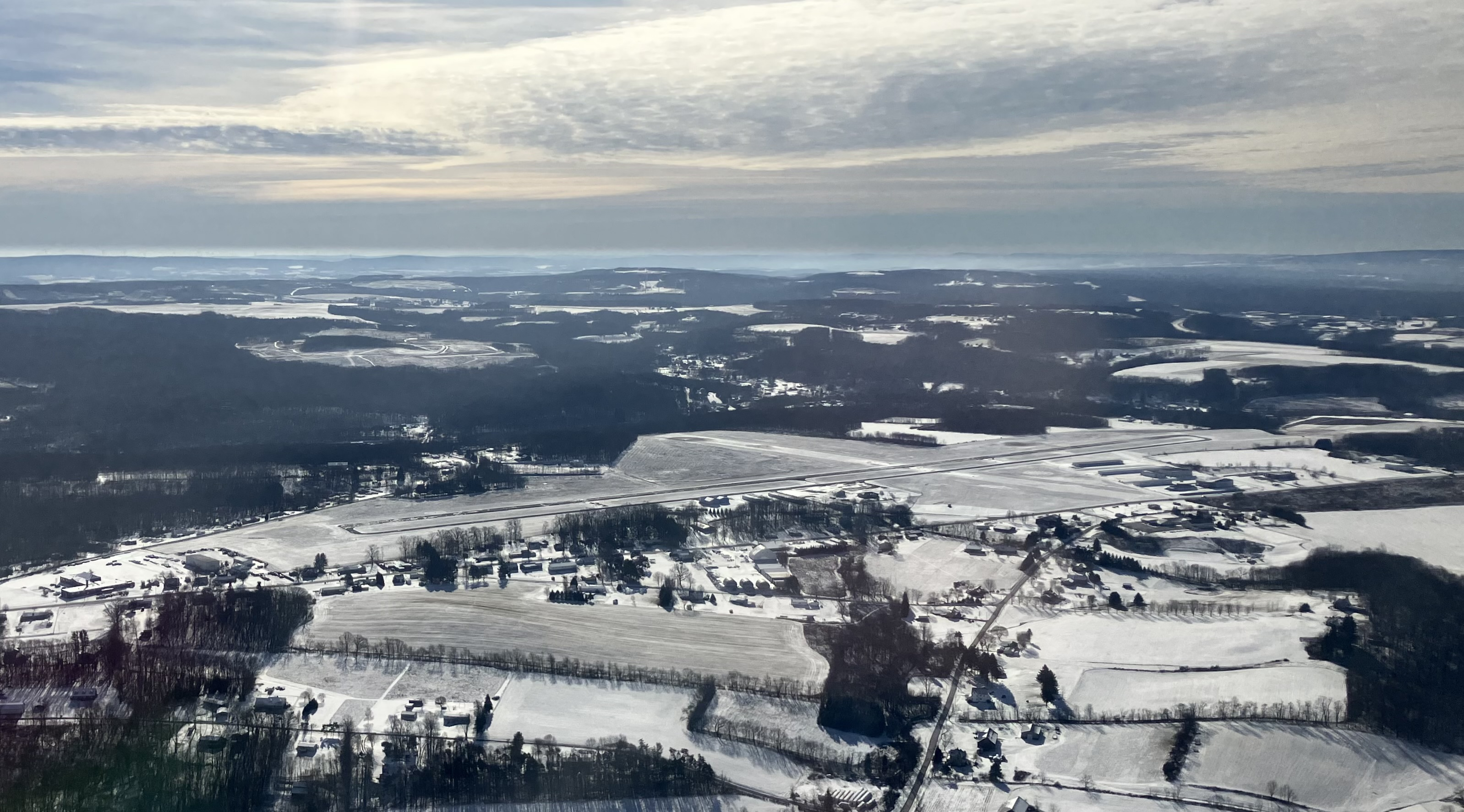
- IATA: none; ICAO: none; FAA LID: 2G9

Summary
- Airport type: Public
- Owner: Board of County Commissioners
- Serves: Somerset, Pennsylvania
- Elevation AMSL: 2,275 ft / 693 m
- Coordinates: 40°02′20″N 079°00′54″W
- Website: Official website

Maps
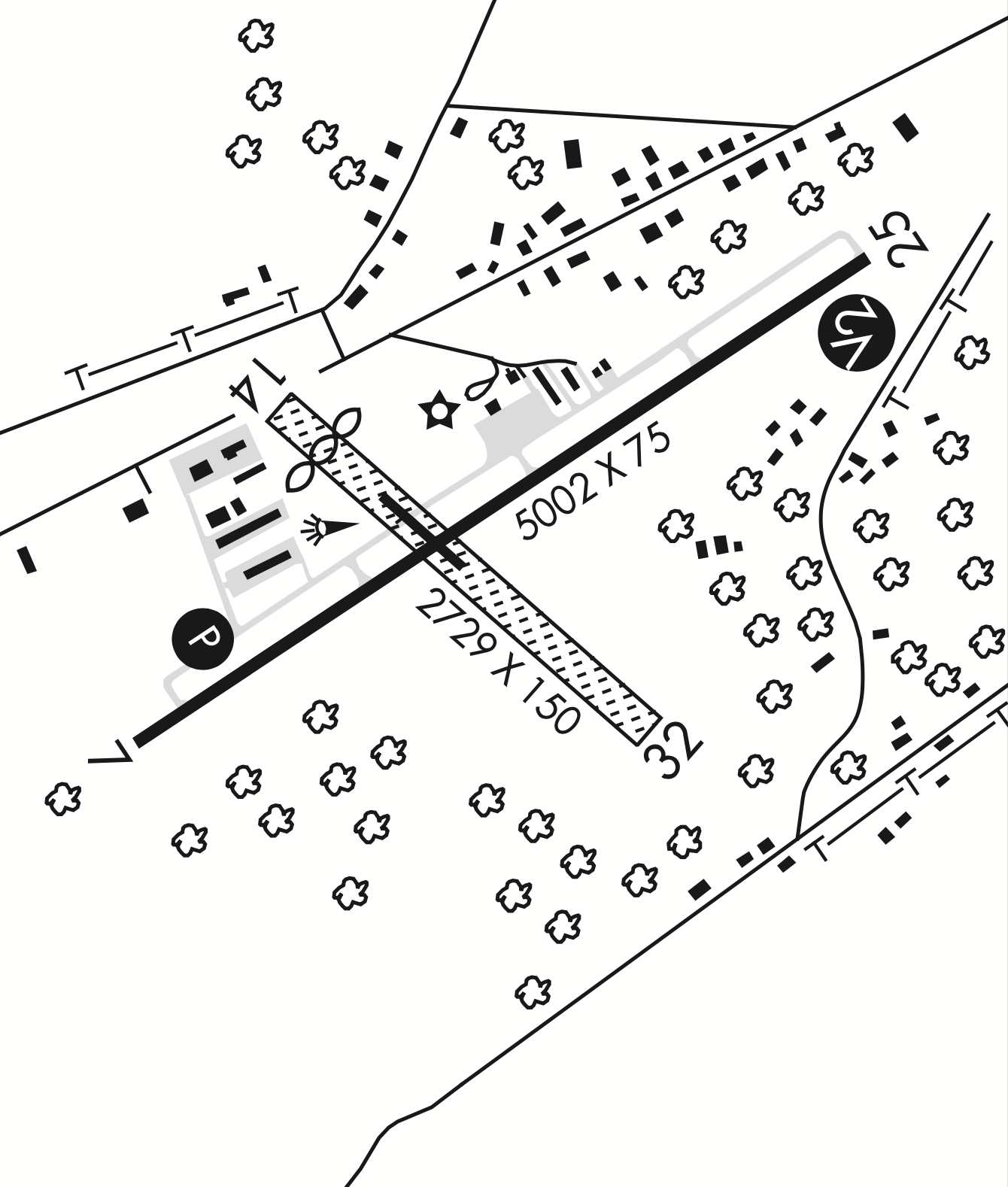

- Location of airport in Pennsylvania 2G9 (the United States)

Runways
Direction	Length		Surface
Direction	ft	m	Surface
7/25	5,002	1,525	Asphalt
14/32	2,695	821	Asphalt/Turf

Statistics (2011)
- Aircraft operations: 21,430
- Based aircraft: 31
- Source: Federal Aviation Administration

Somerset County Airport (FAA LID: 2G9) is a county-owned public airport three miles northeast of Somerset, a borough in Somerset County, Pennsylvania. The National Plan of Integrated Airport Systems for 2025–2029 categorized it as a general aviation facility.

== Facilities ==
The airport covers 231 acres (93 ha) at an elevation of 2,275 ft (693 m). It has two runways: 7/25 is 5,002 by 75 feet (1,525 x 23 m) asphalt; 14/32 is 2,695 by 204 feet (821 x 62 m) asphalt and turf.

In the year ending October 24, 2011, the airport had 21,430 aircraft operations, average 58 per day: 86% general aviation, 12% military, and 2% air taxi. 31 aircraft were then based at the airport: 81% single-engine, 13% ultralight, and 6% multi-engine.

== See also ==
- List of airports in Pennsylvania
