= Grove City Airport =

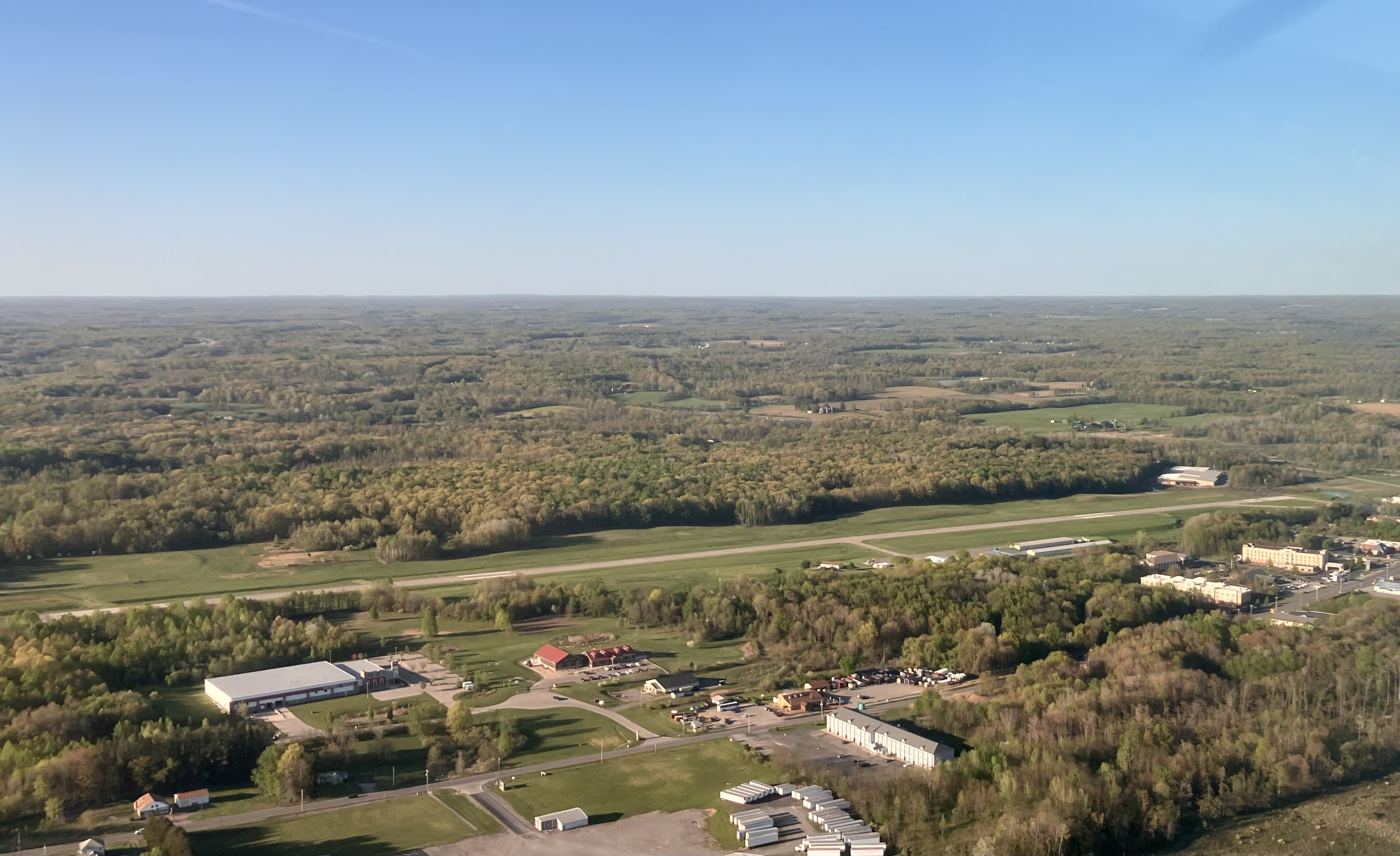
- Aerial photograph of the airport taken from the pattern altitude
- IATA: none; ICAO: none; FAA LID: 29D

Summary
- Airport type: Public
- Owner: Borough of Grove City
- Location: Grove City, Pennsylvania
- Elevation AMSL: 1,371 ft / 417.9 m
- Coordinates: 41°08′45.7″N 080°10′03.9″W

Maps
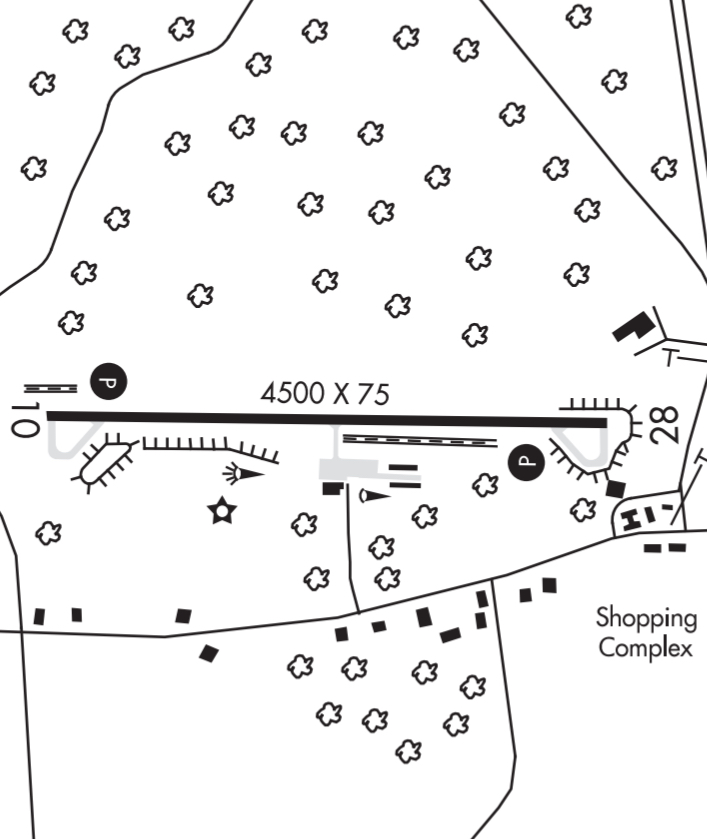

- Location of airport in Pennsylvania 29D (the United States)

Runways
Direction	Length		Surface
Direction	ft	m	Surface
10/28	4,500	1,372	Asphalt

Grove City Airport (FAA LID: 29D) is a public airport 3 miles (4.8 km) west of Grove City, in Mercer County, Pennsylvania. When the old one was phased out, the new one was built in 1973.

== See also ==
- List of airports in Pennsylvania
