= Keller Brothers Airport =

- IATA: none; ICAO: none; FAA LID: 08N

Summary
- Airport type: Public-use, privately owned
- Owner: Keller Brothers Airport Inc
- Location: Lebanon, Pennsylvania
- Elevation AMSL: 550 ft (170 m)
- Coordinates: 40°17′29.5″N 076°19′43.5″W

Map
- Location of airport in Pennsylvania 08N (the United States)

Runways
| Direction | Length | | Surface |
| Direction | ft | m | Surface |
|---|---|---|---|
| 7/25 | 2,692 | 821 | Turf |

Keller Brothers Airport (FAA LID: 08N) is a privately owned, public-use airport 5 miles (8.0 km) south of Lebanon, in Lebanon County, Pennsylvania.

The airport was established in 1946 by the Keller family with as a 600 ft (180 m) long airstrip. It was subsequently extended to 2,700 ft (820 m) in 1961. Instrument approaches and fuel facilities were added in 2005.

In 2024, there were approximately 30 aircraft based at the field, which also hosts an aerobatic flying school and regular community flying events.

== See also ==
- List of airports in Pennsylvania
