= Baublitz Commercial Airport =

Airport in Pennsylvania, US

- IATA: none; ICAO: none; FAA LID: 9W8

Summary
- Airport type: Public
- Serves: Brogue, Pennsylvania
- Elevation AMSL: 750 ft / 229 m
- Coordinates: 39°51′8.365″N 76°29′10.872″W

Map
- Location of Baublitz Commercial Airport in Pennsylvania 9W8 (the United States)

Runways
Direction	Length		Surface
Direction	ft	m	Surface
10/28	2,493	760	Turf
- Source: FAA

Baublitz Commercial Airport (FAA LID: 9W8) is a public-use general aviation airport located 1 mile South of Brogue, Pennsylvania. The airport opened in 1958, but only became public-use in the 1970s.

== Incidents ==
In November of 2019, a 1946 Luscombe aircraft crashed in a field 0.5 miles away from the airport. The owner of the plane – who was uninjured in the crash – disappeared shortly thereafter, although the owner of the plane was later identified by the FAA.

== See also ==
- List of airports in Pennsylvania
