= Philadelphia Seaplane Base =

Philadelphia Seaplane Base Chandler Field
- IATA: PSQ; ICAO: none; FAA LID: 9N2

Summary
- Airport type: Public
- Owner: Township of Tinicum
- Location: Essington, Pennsylvania
- Elevation AMSL: 0 ft / 0 m
- Coordinates: 39°51′38″N 75°18′00″W
- Website: phillyseaplanebase.com

Map
- Location of Philadelphia Seaplane Base PSQ (the United States)

Runways
Direction	Length		Surface
Direction	ft	m	Surface
11/29	9,100	2,774	Water

Statistics (2008)
- Aircraft operations: 4,500
- Source: Federal Aviation Administration

Philadelphia Seaplane Base (IATA: PSQ, FAA LID: 9N2) is a township-owned, public-use seaplane base located one nautical mile (1.85 km) south of the central business district of Essington, a community in Tinicum Township, Delaware County, Pennsylvania, United States. It is situated on the Delaware River, west of Philadelphia International Airport.

Originally, the facility operated during World War I as Chandler Field.

== Facilities and aircraft ==
Philadelphia Seaplane Base covers an area of 8 acres (3.2 ha) at an elevation of 0 feet above mean sea level. It has one seaplane landing area designated 11/29 which measures 9,100 by 250 feet (2,774 x 76 m). For the 12-month period ending September 16, 2008, it had 4,500 general aviation aircraft operations, an average of 12 per day.

== See also ==
- List of airports in Pennsylvania
