= Perkiomen Valley Airport =

- IATA: none; ICAO: none; FAA LID: N10

Summary
- Airport type: CLOSED
- Owner: Estate of Lane R. Jubb
- Serves: Collegeville, Pennsylvania
- Elevation AMSL: 277 ft / 84 m
- Coordinates: 40°12′15″N 075°25′49″W

Map
- Location of airport in Pennsylvania N10 (the United States)

Runways
Direction	Length		Surface
Direction	ft	m	Surface
9/27	2,880	878	Asphalt

Statistics (2012)
- Aircraft operations: 10,520
- Based aircraft: 22
- Source: Federal Aviation Administration

Perkiomen Valley Airport (FAA LID: 32PA (formerly N10)) is formerly a privately owned, public use airport located two nautical miles (4 km) northeast of the central business district of Collegeville, a borough in Montgomery County, Pennsylvania, United States. The airport was built by Wells MacCormack and opened on March 1, 1938. It closed in March of 2021. After being torn down, it is the site of a housing development, Wells Landing It was included in the National Plan of Integrated Airport Systems for 2009–2013, which categorized it as a general aviation facility.

== Facilities and aircraft ==
Perkiomen Valley Airport covers an area of 60 acres (24 ha) at an elevation of 277 feet (84 m) above mean sea level. It has one runway designated 9/27 with an asphalt surface measuring 2,880 by 40 feet (878 x 12 m).

Valley Forge Aviation is a fixed-base operator (FBO) located on the field.

For the 12-month period ending March 15, 2012, the airport had 10,520 aircraft operations, an average of 28 per day: 99.8% general aviation and 0.2% military. At that time there were 22 aircraft based at this airport: 91% single-engine and 9% multi-engine.

== See also ==
- List of airports in Pennsylvania
