= Ebensburg Airport =

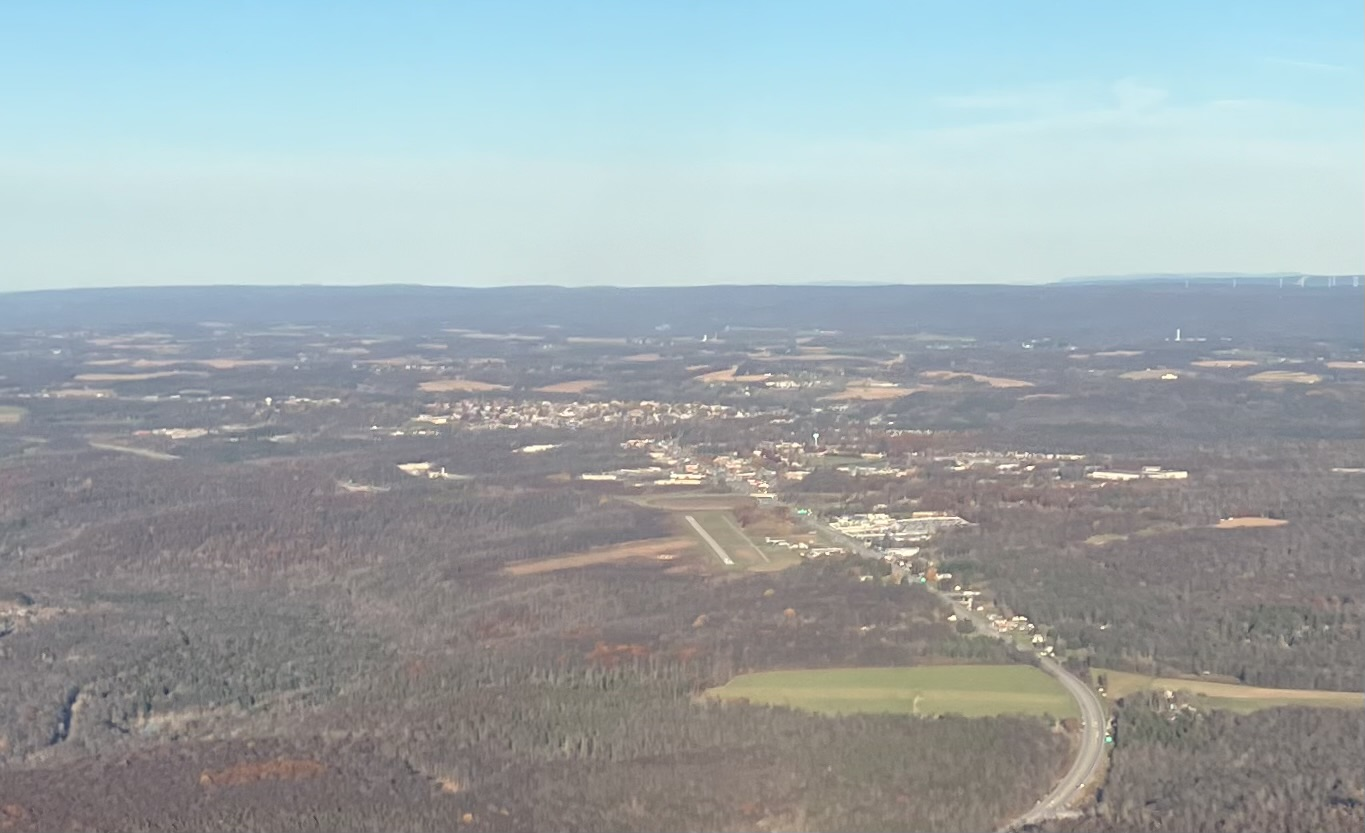
- Aerial view of the airport
- IATA: none; ICAO: none

Summary
- Airport type: Public
- Owner: City of Ebensburg
- Location: Cambria Township, Cambria County, Pennsylvania, near Ebensburg, Pennsylvania
- Elevation AMSL: 2,099 ft / 639 m
- Coordinates: 40°27′36″N 078°46′26″W
- Interactive map of Ebensburg Airport

Runways
Direction	Length		Surface
Direction	ft	m	Surface
07/25	3,024	977	Asphalt
11U/29U			Turf (Ultralight use only)

Ebensburg Airport (FAA LID: 9G8) is a public airport located approximately 3 miles (4.8 km) southwest of Ebensburg, Pennsylvania. It provides general aviation service.

== See also ==
- List of airports in Pennsylvania
- Pennsylvania World War II Army Airfields
