= Hershey Airpark =

- IATA: ~~HER~~; ICAO: ~~KHER~~

Summary
- Airport type: Public, now closed
- Serves: Hershey, Pennsylvania
- Location: Hershey, Pennsylvania
- Opened: 1944
- Closed: 1981
- Interactive map of Hershey Airpark

Runways
Direction	Length		Surface
Direction	ft	m	Surface
8/26	2,600	792	Asphalt (closed)

Hershey Airpark (IATA: ~~HER~~, ICAO: ~~KHER~~) was a public general aviation airport that served Hershey, Pennsylvania from 1944 until 1981.

== History and architectural features ==
Hershey Airpark was constructed by Hershey Estates in 1944 as part of their hotel and entertainment complex.

Hershey was described in the 1962 AOPA Airport Directory as having a single turf runway, and the operator was listed as Hershey Flying Service. A June 23, 1964 aerial photo depicted Hershey Airpark as having a total of six hangars along the east end of the runway. The airpark was located directly across the street from the entrance to Hersheypark, on Hersheypark Drive.

In 1969, the airport's only runway 8/26 was paved over and entered into service later that year as an asphalt runway.

The airport was closed to aircraft service in 1981; however, it was bought by Hersheypark, which considered reopening it multiple times in the 1990s and early 2000s. The park maintained the airport until 2016 when the field was abandoned and the remains of the main terminal building and hangars were demolished.

== See also ==
- List of airports in Pennsylvania
- Aviation in Pennsylvania
