= Greensburg Jeannette Regional Airport =

Airport in Pennsylvania, United States

- IATA: none; ICAO: none; FAA LID: 5G8

Summary
- Airport type: Public use
- Owner: Richard H. King
- Serves: Jeannette, Pennsylvania
- Elevation AMSL: 1,188 ft (362 m)
- Coordinates: 40°22′35″N 079°36′32″W

Map
- Location of airport in Pennsylvania 5G8 (the United States)

Runways
Direction	Length		Surface
Direction	ft	m	Surface
2/20	2,605	794	Asphalt

Statistics (2011)
- Aircraft operations: 4,499
- Based aircraft: 5
- Source: Federal Aviation Administration

The Greensburg Jeannette Regional Airport (FAA LID: 5G8) is a privately owned, public use airport which is located three nautical miles (6 km) north of the central business district of Jeannette, a city in Westmoreland County, Pennsylvania, United States.

This airport was included in the National Plan of Integrated Airport Systems for 2009–2013, which categorized it as a general aviation facility.

== Facilities and aircraft ==
Greensburg Jeannette Regional Airport covers an area of 121 acres (49 ha) at an elevation of 1,188 feet (362 m) above mean sea level. It has one runway designated 2/20 with an asphalt surface measuring 2,605 by 50 feet (794 x 15 m).

For the twelve-month period ending November 22, 2011, the airport had 4,499 aircraft operations, an average of 12 per day: 98% general aviation and 2% military. At that time, there were five aircraft based at this airport: 80% single-engine and 20% helicopter.

== See also ==
- List of airports in Pennsylvania
