= Pittsburgh Northeast Airport =

Airport in the US

Pittsburgh Northeast Airport (West Penn Airport) (Rock Airport)
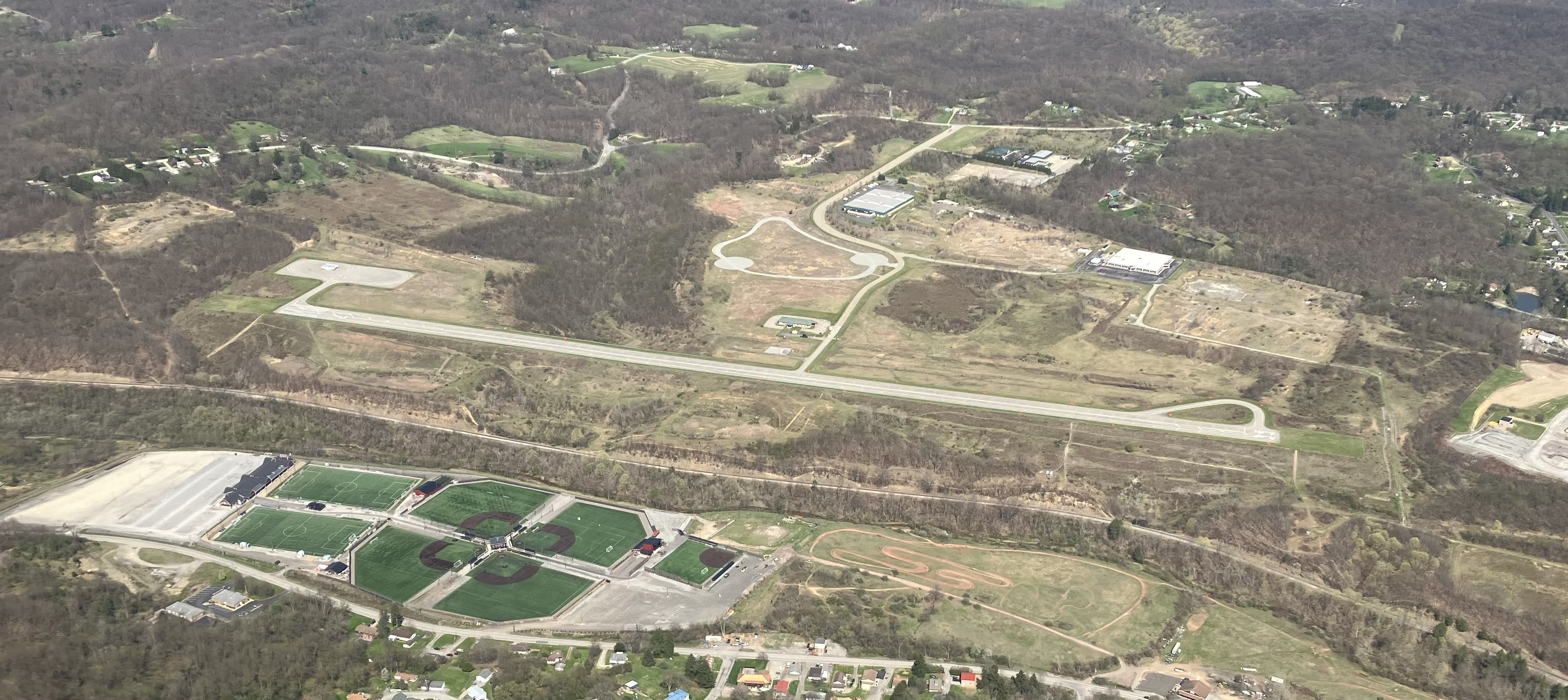
- IATA: none; ICAO: none; FAA LID: 9G1

Summary
- Airport type: Public use
- Owner: Alaskan Property Management Co LLC
- Serves: Pittsburgh / Tarentum, Pennsylvania
- Location: Indiana Township, West Deer Township, Pennsylvania
- Elevation AMSL: 1,063 ft / 324 m
- Coordinates: 40°36′13″N 079°49′34″W

Map
- Location of airport in Pennsylvania 9G1 (the United States)

Runways
Direction	Length		Surface
Direction	ft	m	Surface
17/35	3,550	1,082	Asphalt

Statistics (2024)
- Aircraft operations (12 months ending June 2, 2021): 1000
- Based aircraft: 0
- Source: Federal Aviation Administration

Pittsburgh Northeast Airport (FAA LID: 9G1) was a privately owned, public use airport in Allegheny County, Pennsylvania, United States. The airport is currently abandoned. The airport is located 12 nautical miles (14 mi, 22 km) north-northeast of the central business district of Pittsburgh, in West Deer Township. The airport is located a few miles north of Pittsburgh Mills shopping mall.

== Facilities and aircraft ==
Pittsburgh Northeast Airport covers an area of 149 acres (60 ha) at an elevation of 1,063 feet (324 m) above mean sea level. It has one runway designated 17/35 with an asphalt surface measuring 3,550 by 100 feet (1,082 x 30 m).

For the 12-month period ending November 23, 2011, the airport had 2,982 aircraft operations, an average of 248 per month: 99% general aviation and 1% military. At that time there were 20 aircraft based at this airport: 95% single-engine and 5% multi-engine. As of March 2019, no aircraft are based in the facility.

== History ==
The property went through a major overhaul between 2000 and 2004, and can now accommodate larger aircraft. The airport's former runway, designated 2/20, had an asphalt surface measuring 2,645 by 36 feet (806 x 11 m).

This airport was included in the National Plan of Integrated Airport Systems for 2009–2013, which categorized it as a general aviation facility. It was originally known as West Penn Airport.

Formerly known as Rock Airport, Pittsburgh Northeast Airport was bought for $9 million in 2014 by Alaskan Property Management, a subsidiary of Management Science Associates, after the former owner filed for bankruptcy.

In 2022, the airport was used by Carnegie Mellon University and used to test drones.

== Incidents ==
On May 11, 2011, shortly after 1:45pm two students, a science teacher, and a pilot attempted a takeoff on runway 35. They went off the end of the runway and fell off the bank.

== See also ==
- List of airports in Pennsylvania
