= Bloomsburg Municipal Airport =

- IATA: none; ICAO: none; FAA LID: N13

Summary
- Airport type: Public
- Owner: Town Of Bloomsburg
- Location: Bloomsburg, Pennsylvania
- Elevation AMSL: 481 ft / 147 m
- Coordinates: 40°59′52″N 76°26′10″W
- Interactive map of Bloomsburg Municipal Airport

Runways
Direction	Length		Surface
Direction	ft	m	Surface
9/27	3,200	975	Asphalt

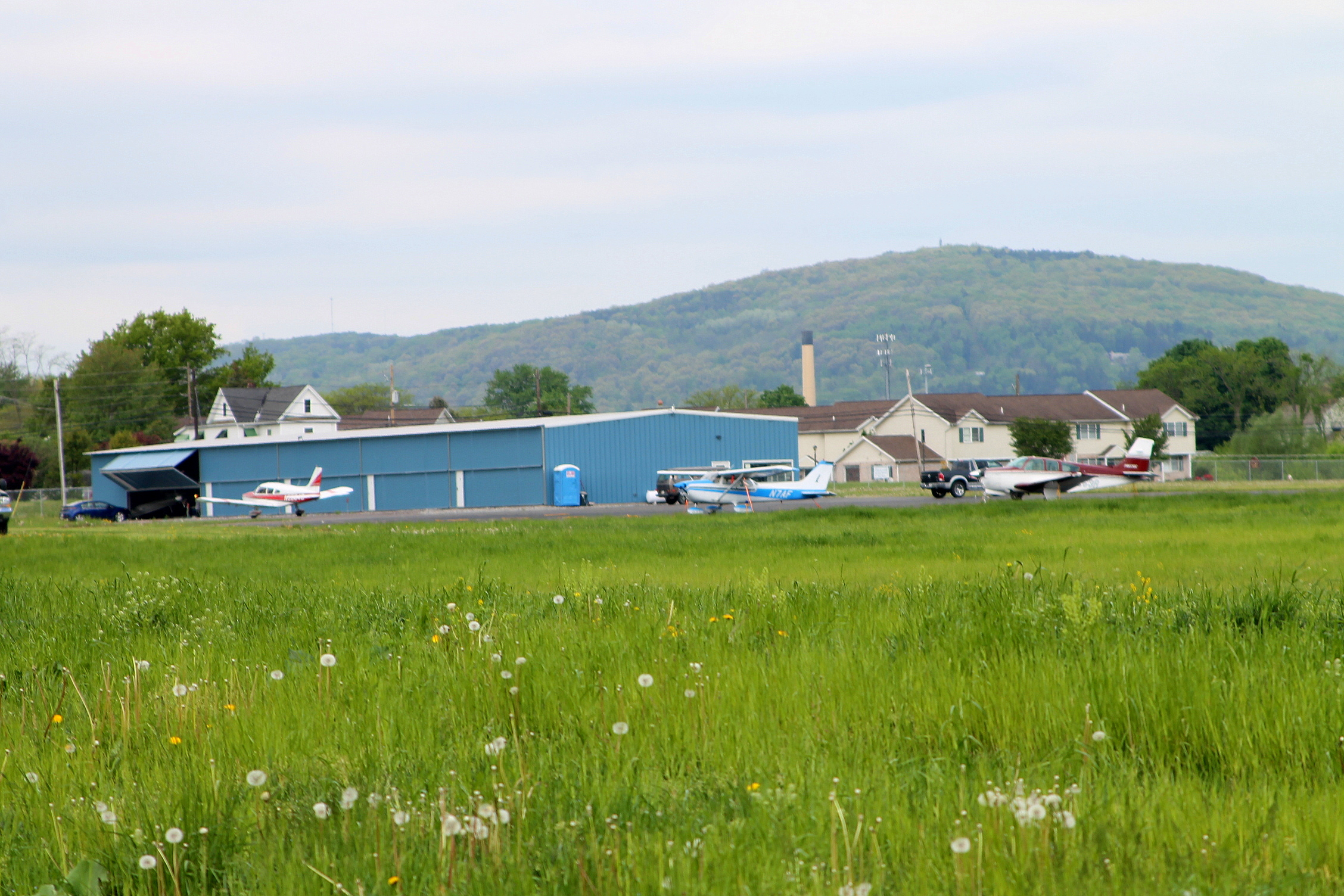
Airplanes at the Bloomsburg Municipal Airport from Airport Road

Bloomsburg Municipal Airport (FAA LID: N13) is a public non-towered general aviation airport along the Susquehanna River within town limits on the south east corner of Bloomsburg.

Services: Columbia Aircraft Services, Inc.

Fuel: 100LL

Flight School: Turn 2 Aviation LLC.

Clubs: Parlor City Flying Club

== See also ==
- List of airports in Pennsylvania
