= Punxsutawney Municipal Airport =

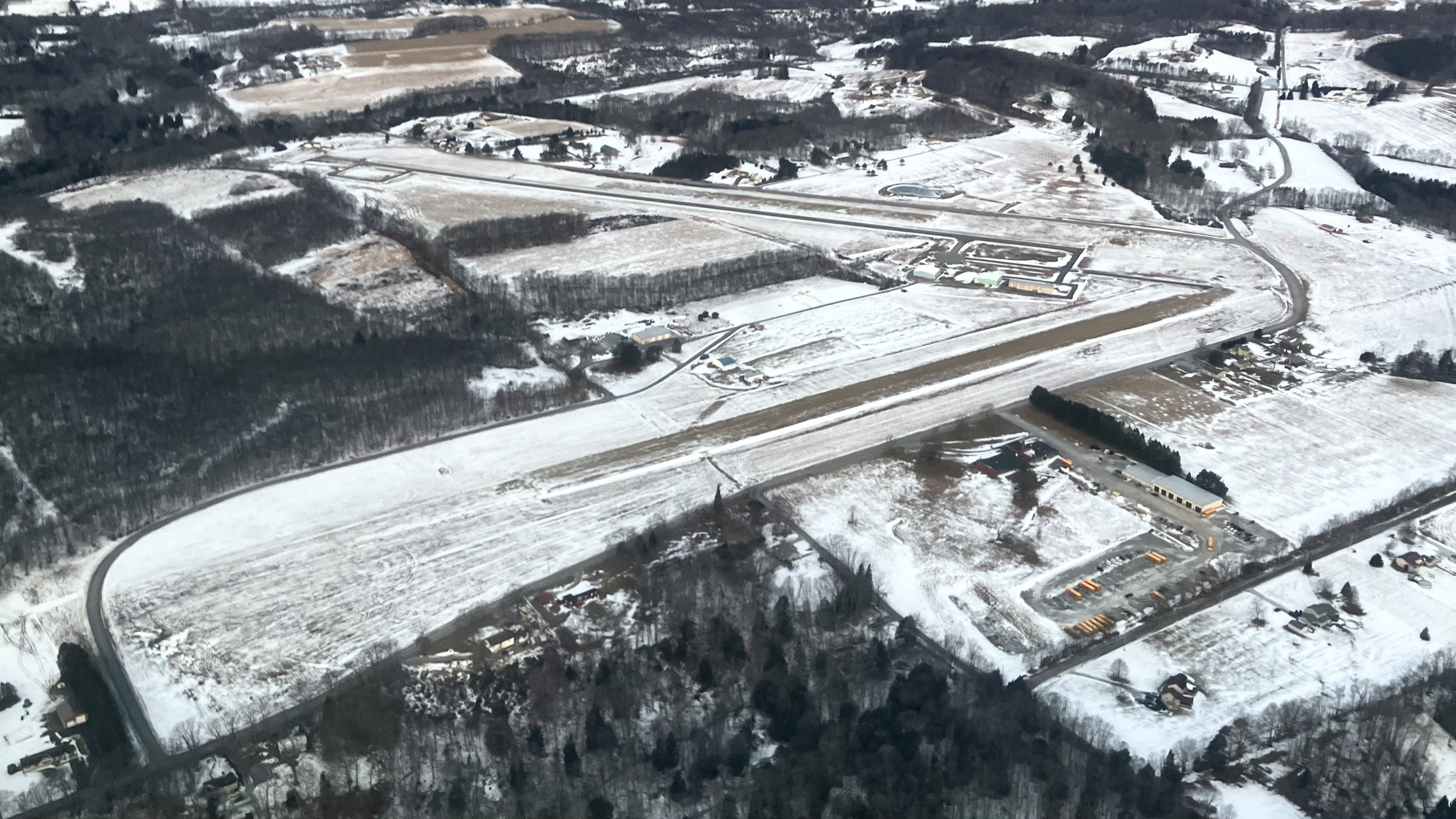
- IATA: none; ICAO: none; FAA LID: N35

Summary
- Airport type: Public
- Owner: Punxsutawney Airport Authority
- Location: Punxsutawney, Pennsylvania
- Opened: October 4, 1929
- Elevation AMSL: 1,439 ft / 438.6 m
- Coordinates: 40°58′00″N 078°55′45″W

Maps
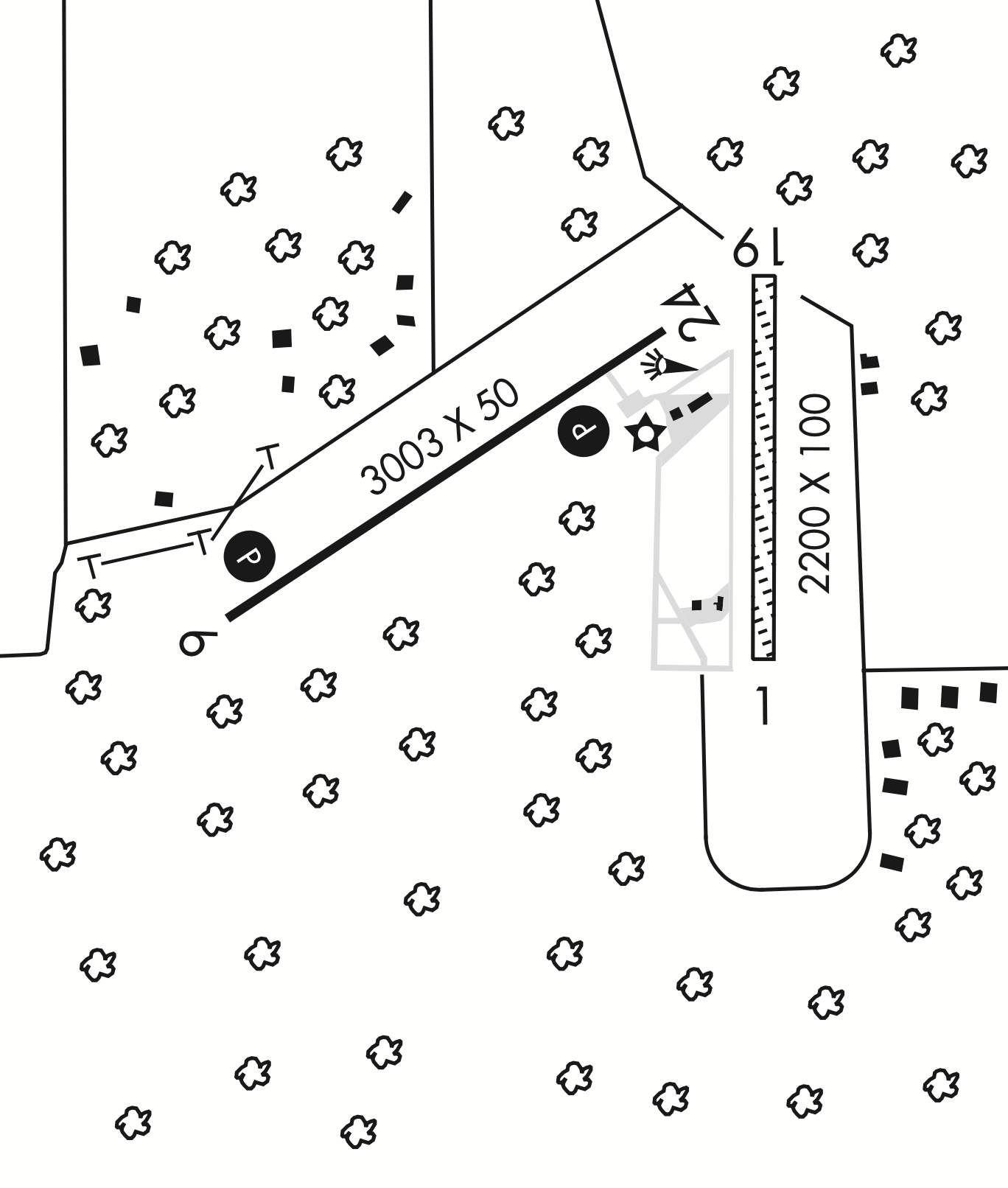
- Location of airport in Pennsylvania

Runways
Direction	Length		Surface
Direction	ft	m	Surface
6/24	3,003	915	Asphalt
1/19	2,026	618	Turf

Statistics (2015)
- Based aircraft: 10

Punxsutawney Municipal Airport is a small regional non-towered airport located three miles (4.8 km) northeast of Punxsutawney, Pennsylvania in Bell Township.

The airport has never had schedule airliner traffic throughout its history. It is designated by the Federal Aviation Administration as a low traffic regional non commercial airport. In 2014 the airport had a little over 11,000 aircraft operations. It is not unusual to see few or no aircraft arrivals or departures from the airport over the course of a day.

As designated by the FAA in 2015 the airport had 10 based aircraft, all fixed wing single engine airplanes. That same year the aircraft chart had 77% local general aviation, 19% transient general aviation and 4% military.

The airport was opened on October 4, 1929, at the time it was a single grass landing strip. Approximately 1,000 locals were in attendance when the airport was dedicated. In the late 70s or early 80s runway 6/24 was built the only asphalt runway at the airport.

== See also ==
- List of airports in Pennsylvania
