= Wellsboro Johnston Airport =

- IATA: none; ICAO: none; FAA LID: N38

Summary
- Airport type: Public
- Serves: Wellsboro, Pennsylvania
- Location: Wellsboro, Pennsylvania
- Opened: March 1947; 79 years ago
- Elevation AMSL: 1,892 ft / 577 m
- Coordinates: 41°43′40″N 077°23′43″W

Map
- Location of airport in Pennsylvania N38 (the United States)

Runways
Direction	Length		Surface
Direction	ft	m	Surface
10/28	3,597	1,096	Asphalt
11/29	1,600	488	Turf

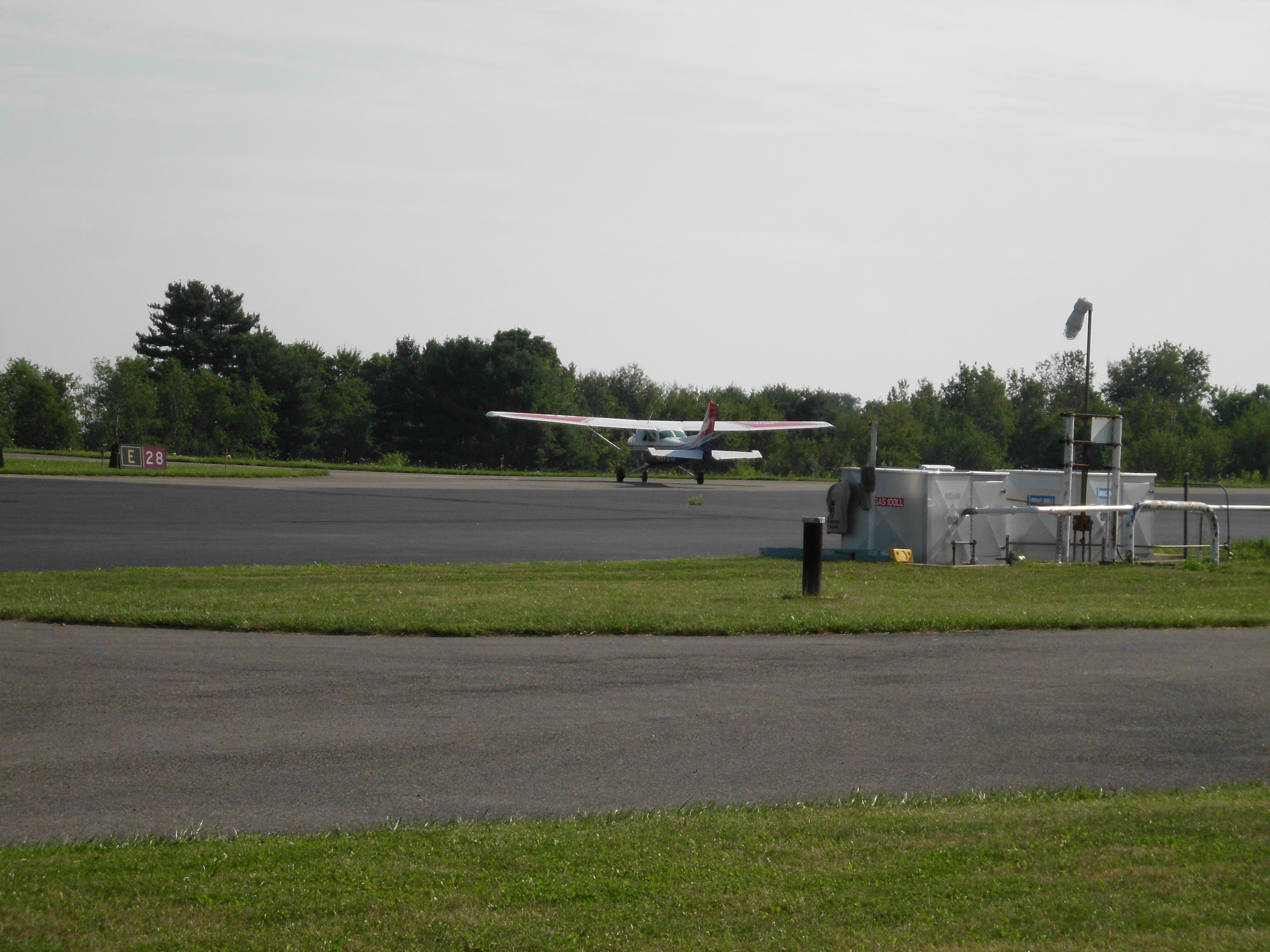
A Civil Air Patrol Cessna 172 taxiing at N38

Wellsboro Johnston Airport (FAA LID: N38) is a public non-towered general aviation Airport that is located 4 miles SW of and serves Wellsboro, Pennsylvania.

== Facilities and aircraft ==
The airport covers 349 acres (141 hectares) at an elevation of 1,891.5 ft (576.5 m). The airport has two active runways: 10/28 is an asphalt runway 3,597 ft in length and 60 ft wide (1,096 x 18 m), and 11/29 is a turf surface that is 1,600 by 100 ft (488 by 30 m).

Aircraft operations average 109 a week, approximately 5,500 a year. Operations are divided: 53% local general aviation, 44% transient general aviation, 4% air taxi. There are 28 aircraft based on the field: 22 are single engine, 1 multi-engine and 5 ultralights.

== See also ==
- List of airports in Pennsylvania
