= Bendigo Airport (Pennsylvania) =

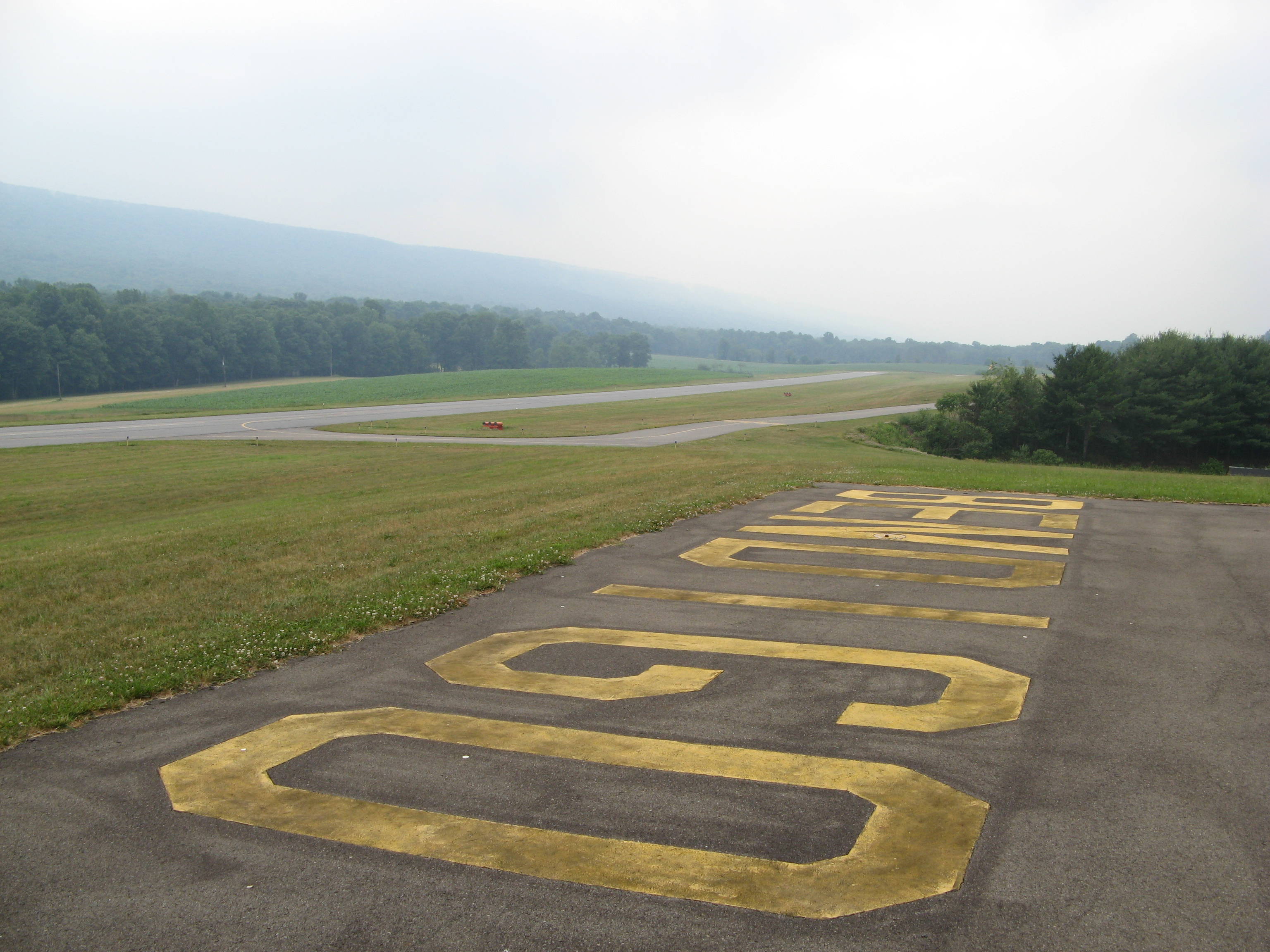
- Ground view looking SW
- IATA: none; ICAO: none; FAA LID: 74N

Summary
- Airport type: Public
- Owner: Helen Bendigo
- Operator: Paul Bendigo
- Serves: Tower City, Pennsylvania
- Elevation AMSL: 791 ft (241 m)
- Coordinates: 40°33′31″N 076°33′34″W

Map
- Location of airport in Pennsylvania 74N (the United States)

Runways
Direction	Length		Surface
Direction	ft	m	Surface
5/23	2,325	709	Asphalt/Concrete

Bendigo Airport (FAA LID: 74N) is a public-use airport located in Dauphin County, Pennsylvania, United States. It is two miles (3 km) south of the central business district of Tower City in Schuylkill County. This airport is privately owned by Helen Bendigo.

== Facilities ==
Bendigo Airport covers an area of 41 acres (17 ha) and contains one runway:

- Runway 5/23: 2,325 x 60 ft (709 x 18 m), Surface: Asphalt/Concrete

== See also ==
- List of airports in Pennsylvania
