= Reigle Field =

- IATA: none; ICAO: none; FAA LID: 58N

Summary
- Airport type: Public use
- Owner: Wade/Duane Reigle
- Serves: Palmyra, Pennsylvania
- Elevation AMSL: 489 ft / 149 m
- Coordinates: 40°17′12″N 076°34′37″W
- Website: ReigleAirport.com

Map
- Location of airport in Pennsylvania 58N (the United States)

Runways
Direction	Length		Surface
Direction	ft	m	Surface
13/31	1,955	596	Asphalt

Statistics (2012)
- Aircraft operations: 30,000
- Based aircraft: 65
- Source: Federal Aviation Administration

Reigle Field (FAA LID: 58N), also known as Reigle Airport, is a privately owned, public use airport located two nautical miles (4 km) south of the central business district of Palmyra, in Lebanon County, Pennsylvania, United States.

== Facilities and aircraft ==
Reigle Field covers an area of 42 acres (17 ha) at an elevation of 489 feet (149 m) above mean sea level. It has one runway designated 13/31 with an asphalt surface measuring 1,955 by 40 feet (596 x 12 m).

For the 12-month period ending January 25, 2012, the airport had 30,000 general aviation aircraft operations, an average of 82 per day. At that time there were 65 aircraft based at this airport, all single-engine.

Reigle also offers maintenance to aircraft including fabric and sheet metal work, restorations, engine work, and annuals or 100-hour inspections.

== See also ==
- List of airports in Pennsylvania
