= Northumberland County Airport =

- IATA: none; ICAO: none; FAA LID: N79

Summary
- Airport type: Public
- Owner: Northumberland County; Airport Authority
- Serves: Shamokin / Elysburg
- Elevation AMSL: 880.6 ft / 268.4 m
- Coordinates: 40°50′12″N 076°33′08″W

Map
- Location of airport in Pennsylvania N79 (the United States)

Runways
Direction	Length		Surface
Direction	ft	m	Surface
8/26	3,297	1,005	Asphalt

Statistics (2016)
- Based aircraft: 23

Northumberland County Airport is a small general aviation non-towered airport located in Paxinos, Pennsylvania. It is centrally located between Shamokin and Elysburg. The airport has one asphalt runway (8/26) which is 3297 x 75 ft. / 1005 x 23 m. As of late 2016 there are 23 aircraft based on the field of them 21 are single engine, one being multi engine fixed wing and 1 helicopter aircraft.

The airport is a public use facility and is owned and maintained by the Northumberland County Airport Authority. Aircraft operations average 63 per day with approximately 22,000 a year. 65% local general aviation, 35% transient general aviation and <1% military.

== See also ==
- List of airports in Pennsylvania
