= Erie County Airport =

- IATA: none; ICAO: none; FAA LID: 3G1

Summary
- Airport type: Public
- Owner: Thomas L. Mountain
- Serves: Wattsburg, Pennsylvania
- Elevation AMSL: 1,494 ft (455 m)
- Coordinates: 42°02′39″N 079°51′13″W

Map
- Location of airport in Pennsylvania

Runways
Direction	Length		Surface
Direction	ft	m	Surface
9/27	3,030	924	Asphalt
- Source: Federal Aviation Administration

Erie County Airport (FAA LID: 3G1) is a privately owned, public use airport in Erie County, Pennsylvania, United States. It is located three nautical miles (6 km) northwest of the central business district of Wattsburg, Pennsylvania. It is currently listed as abandoned on the Detroit sectional chart.

== Facilities and aircraft ==
Erie County Airport covers an area of 361 acres (146 ha) at an elevation of 1,494 feet (455 m) above mean sea level. It has one runway designated 9/27 with an asphalt surface measuring 3,030 by 60 feet (924 x 18 m).
