= Titusville Airport =

City-owned public airport in Crawford County, Pennsylvania

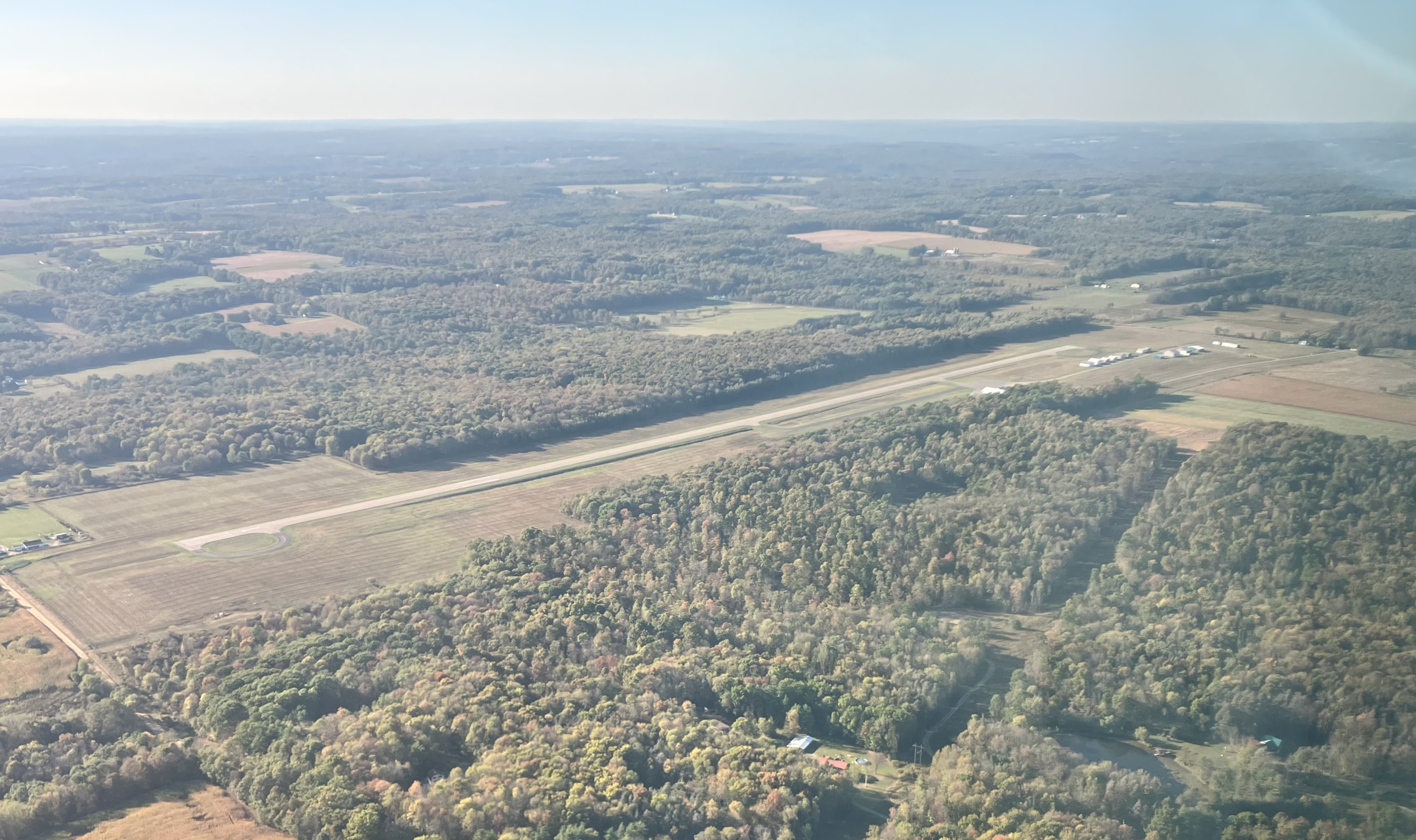
- IATA: none; ICAO: none; FAA LID: 6G1

Summary
- Airport type: Public
- Owner: City of Titusville
- Serves: Titusville, Pennsylvania
- Location: Cherrytree Township, Pennsylvania
- Elevation AMSL: 1,600 ft / 488 m
- Coordinates: 41°36′32″N 079°44′29″W
- Website: Official website

Maps
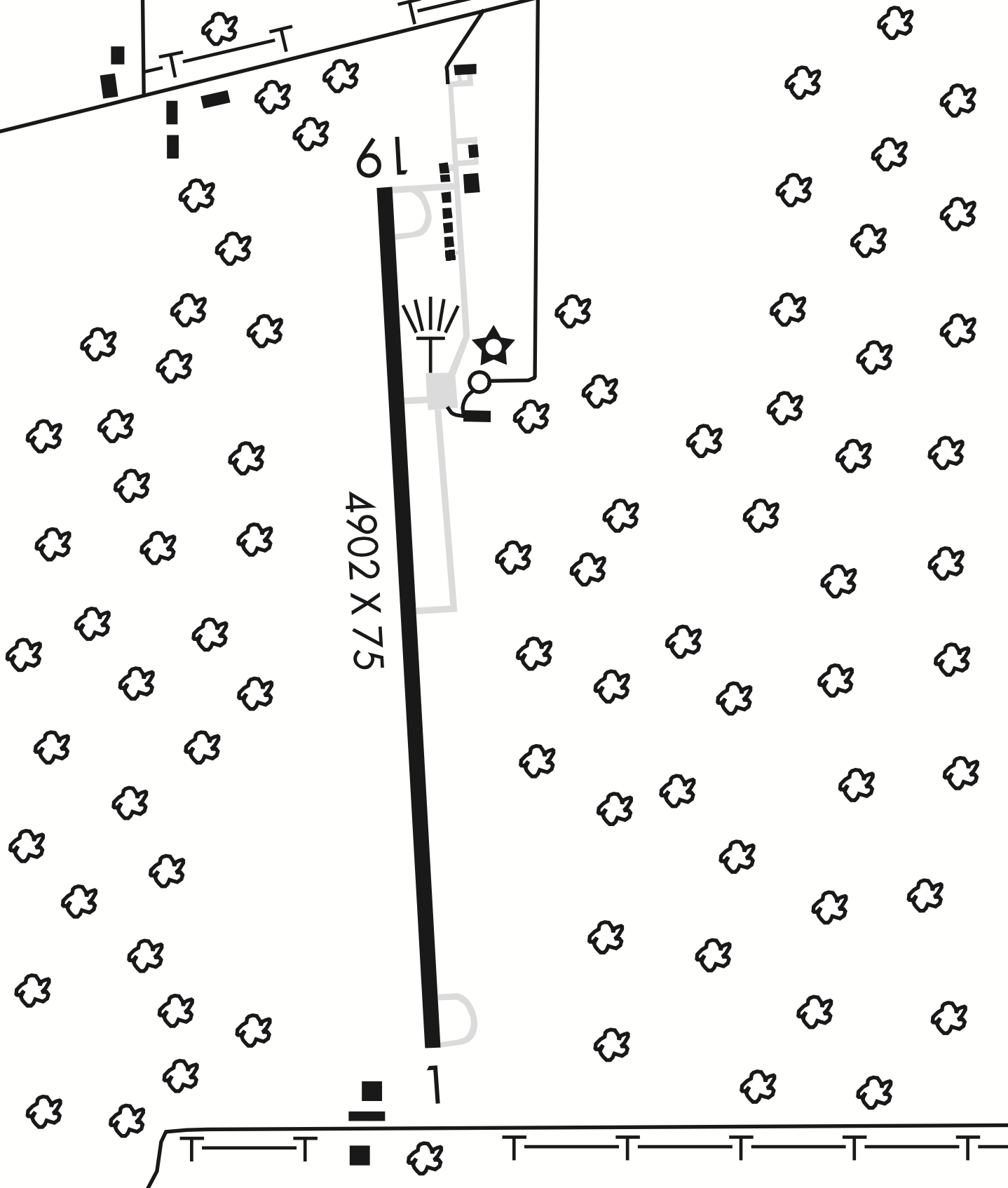

- Location of airport in Pennsylvania 6G1 (the United States)

Runways
Direction	Length		Surface
Direction	ft	m	Surface
1/19	4,902	1,494	Asphalt

Statistics (2011)
- Aircraft operations: 9,506
- Based aircraft: 18
- Source: Federal Aviation Administration

Titusville Airport (FAA LID: 6G1), also known as TItusville Municipal Airport, is a city-owned public airport three miles west of Titusville, in Crawford County, Pennsylvania. The National Plan of Integrated Airport Systems for 2011–2015 categorized it as a general aviation facility.

== Facilities ==
Titusville Airport covers 204 acres (83 ha) at an elevation of 1,600 feet (488 m). Its one runway, 1/19, is 4,902 by 75 feet (1,494 x 23 m) asphalt.

In the year ending October 21, 2011 the airport had 9,506 aircraft operations, average 26 per day: 99.9% general aviation and 0.1% military. 18 aircraft were then based at the airport: 72% single-engine, 22% ultralight, and 6% multi-engine.

== See also ==
- List of airports in Pennsylvania
