= McGinness Airport =

- IATA: none; ICAO: none; FAA LID: 8N7

Summary
- Airport type: Closed
- Owner: Dorothy McGinness
- Operator: Patrick McGinness
- Serves: Columbia, Pennsylvania
- Elevation AMSL: 334 ft / 102 m
- Coordinates: 40°01′31″N 076°29′14″W

Map
- Location of airport in Pennsylvania

Runways
Direction	Length		Surface
Direction	ft	m	Surface
11/29	1,850	564	Turf
08/26	1,800	549	Turf

Statistics (2013)
- Aircraft operations: 275
- Based aircraft: 0
- Source: SkyVector

McGinness Airport (FAA LID: 8N7) (also known as McGinness Field) is a closed public-use private airport located one mile from Columbia, Pennsylvania. It had been active from December 1949 till Spring 2014.

In August 2021, the airport was bought by the Colombia Borough Council as a part of the boroughs ongoing economic revitalization efforts.
