= Mount Pleasant/Scottdale Airport =

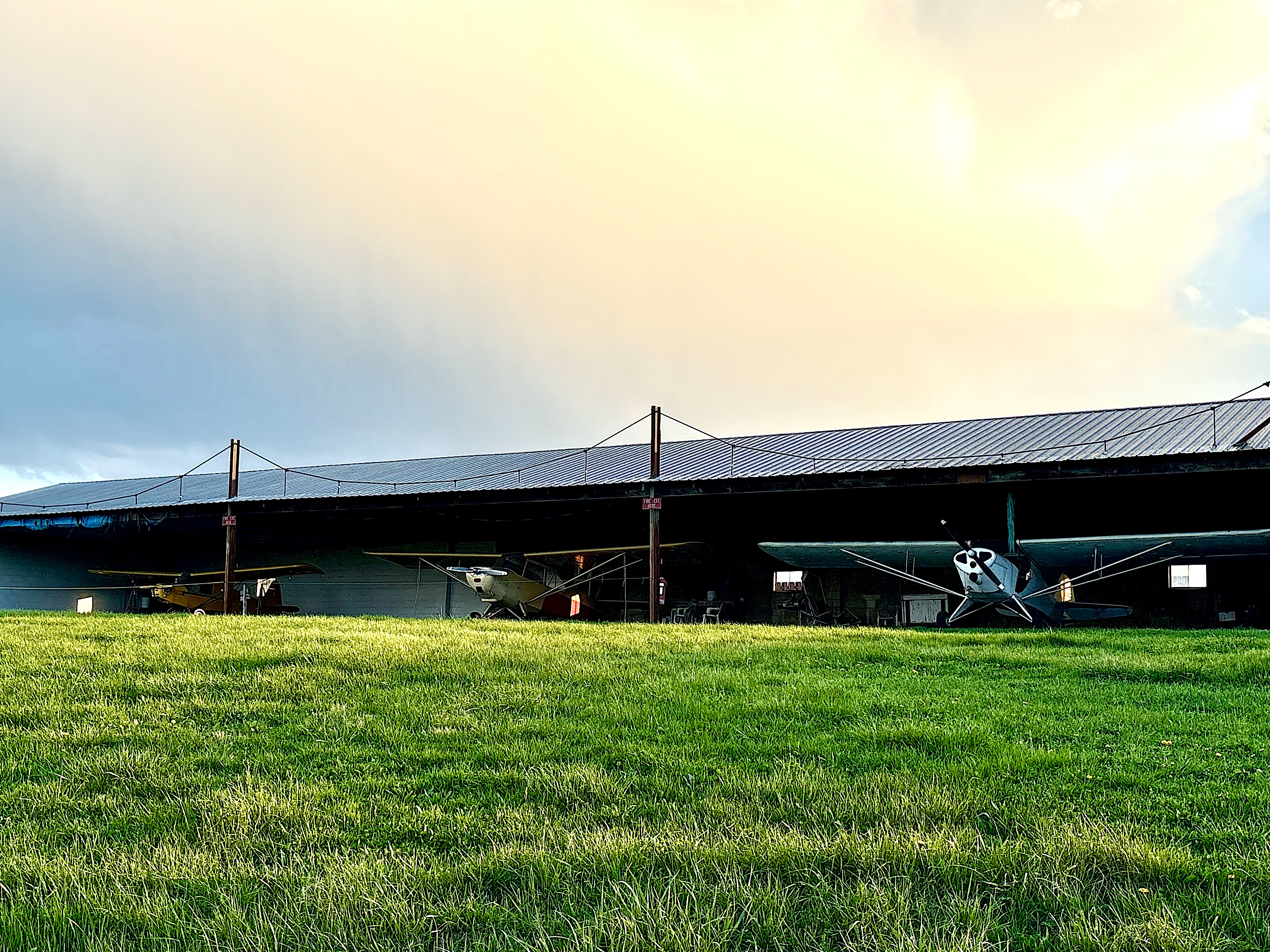
- Private planes docked at the airport in 2026
- IATA: none; ICAO: none; FAA LID: P45

Summary
- Airport type: Public use
- Owner: William C. Hoffman
- Serves: Mount Pleasant / Scottdale, Pennsylvania
- Elevation AMSL: 1,160 ft / 354 m
- Coordinates: 40°06′30″N 079°32′29″W

Map
- Location of airport in Pennsylvania P45 (the United States)

Runways
Direction	Length		Surface
Direction	ft	m	Surface
6/24	2,188	667	Turf
14/32	1,600	488	Turf

Statistics (2010)
- Aircraft operations: 900
- Based aircraft: 14
- Source: Federal Aviation Administration

Mount Pleasant/Scottdale Airport (FAA LID: P45) is a privately owned, public use airport in Fayette County, Pennsylvania, United States. It is located three nautical miles (6 km) south of the central business district of Mount Pleasant and near Scottdale, both boroughs in Westmoreland County.

This airport was included in the National Plan of Integrated Airport Systems for 2009–2013, which categorized it as a general aviation facility.

== History ==
The origins of Mount Pleasant/Scottdale Airport date to the mid-20th century, reflecting the broader expansion of small general aviation facilities across rural Pennsylvania following World War II. The airport was officially activated in March 1947, during a period when private aviation and pilot training experienced significant growth in the United States.

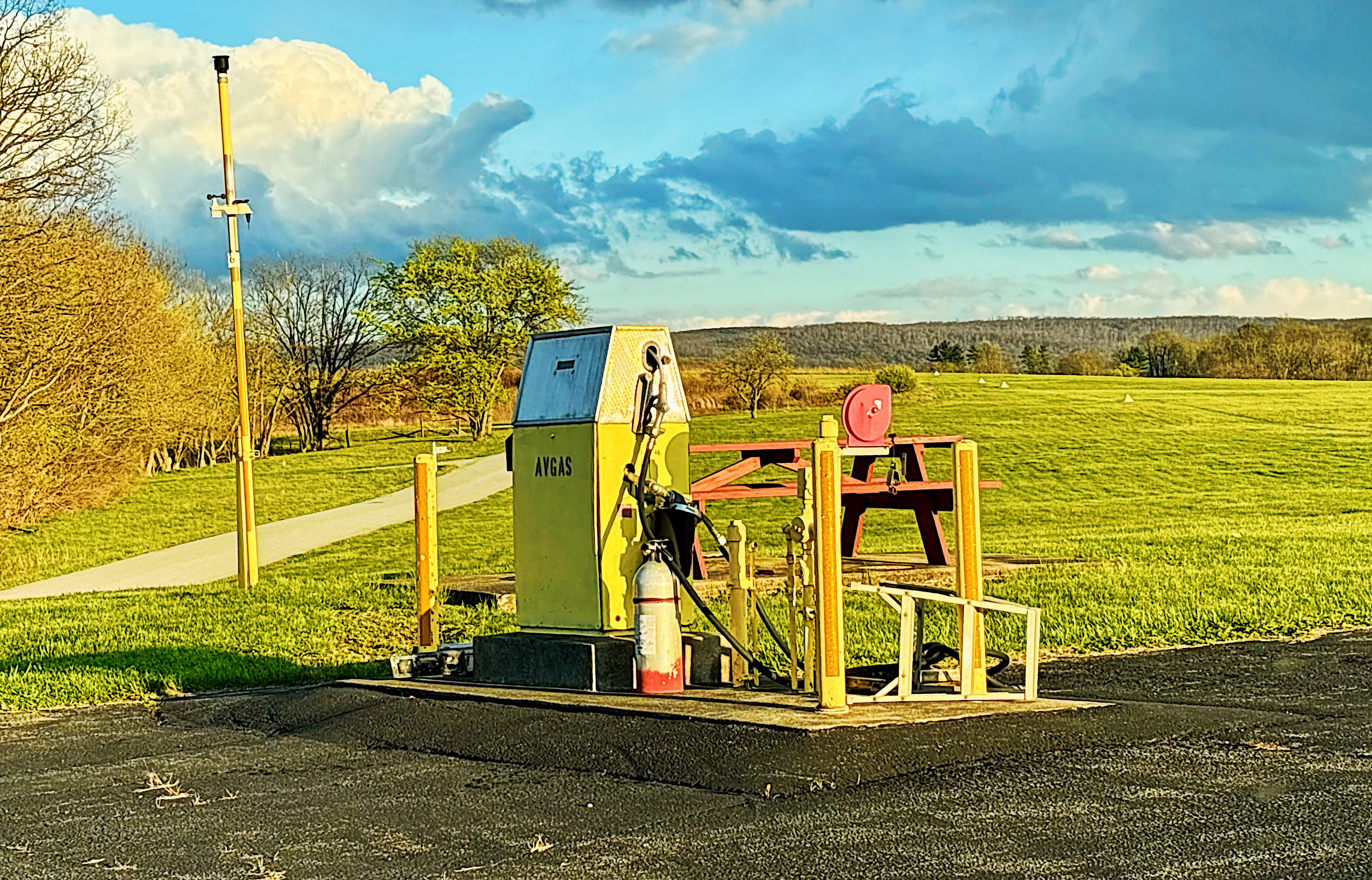
Fueling station at the airport

Like many similar airfields established during this era, the airport was developed as a local general aviation facility, intended to serve private pilots, recreational flying, and limited business aviation needs rather than commercial airline traffic. Its location between Mount Pleasant and Scottdale placed it within a region historically tied to coal, coke production, and light industry, where small aircraft could provide transportation and aerial access not otherwise available.

The airport has remained privately owned throughout its history, with operations open to the public. Over time, ownership transitioned to private individuals and later to a limited liability entity, while local management has remained consistent, reflecting its role as a community-oriented airfield.

In the early 21st century, Mount Pleasant/Scottdale Airport was included in the National Plan of Integrated Airport Systems (NPIAS) for 2009–2013, where it was categorized as a general aviation airport, underscoring its continued importance in regional aviation infrastructure.

== Facilities and aircraft ==
Mount Pleasant/Scottdale Airport covers an area of 54 acres (22 ha) at an elevation of 1,160 feet (354 m) above mean sea level. It has two runways with turf surfaces: 6/24 is 2,188 by 161 feet (667 x 49 m) and 14/32 is 1,600 by 220 feet (488 x 67 m).

For the 12-month period ending October 29, 2010, the airport had 900 general aviation aircraft operations, an average of 75 per month. At that time there were 14 aircraft based at this airport: 93% single-engine and 7% ultralight. The airport does not have a control tower, and operations are conducted under visual flight rules (VFR) using a common traffic advisory frequency (CTAF).

== See also ==
- List of airports in Pennsylvania
