= Millard Airport (Pennsylvania) =

- IATA: none; ICAO: none; FAA LID: N76

Summary
- Airport type: Public
- Serves: Annville, Pennsylvania
- Elevation AMSL: 485 ft / 148 m
- Coordinates: 40°19′02″N 076°32′11″W

Map
- Location of airport in Pennsylvania N76 (the United States)

Runways
Direction	Length		Surface
Direction	ft	m	Surface
11/29	2,870	875	Asphalt

Statistics (2006)
- Aircraft operations: 8,500
- Based aircraft: 6
- Sources: FAA and PennDOT

Millard Airport (FAA LID: N76) was a public use airport located one nautical mile (2 km) southwest of the central business district of Annville, in Lebanon County, Pennsylvania, United States. It later became a private use airport (FAA LID: 4PA0).

== Facilities and aircraft ==
Millard Airport covered an area of 80 acres (32 ha) at an elevation of 485 feet (148 m) above mean sea level. It had one runway designated 11/29 with an asphalt surface measuring 2,870 by 50 feet (875 x 15 m).

For the 12-month period ending May 25, 2006, the airport had 8,500 general aviation aircraft operations, an average of 23 per day. At that time there were six single-engine aircraft based at this airport.

== See also ==
- List of airports in Pennsylvania
- Reigle Field, a public use airport located at 40°17′12″N 076°34′37″W, 3 nautical miles (6 km) southwest of Millard Airport
