= Stroudsburg–Pocono Airport =

Defunct airport in Pennsylvania

- IATA: ESP; ICAO: none; FAA LID: N53

Summary
- Airport type: Public use
- Owner: Pocono Stroudsburg Airport Inc.
- Serves: East Stroudsburg, Pennsylvania
- Closed: March 1, 2022
- Elevation AMSL: 480 ft / 146 m
- Coordinates: 41°02′09″N 075°09′38″W

Map
- Location of airport in Pennsylvania ESP (the United States)

Runways
Direction	Length		Surface
Direction	ft	m	Surface
8/26	3,087	941	Asphalt

Statistics (2012)
- Aircraft operations: 18,820
- Based aircraft: 34
- Source: Federal Aviation Administration

Stroudsburg–Pocono Airport (IATA: ESP, FAA LID: N53) was a privately owned, public use airport located three nautical miles (6 km) north of the central business district of East Stroudsburg, a borough in Monroe County, Pennsylvania, United States. This airport was included in the National Plan of Integrated Airport Systems for 2009–2013, which categorized it as a general aviation facility. The airport was permanently closed on March 1, 2022, when the property was sold to Black Buffalo 3D printing company.

== Facilities and aircraft ==
Stroudsburg–Pocono Airport covered an area of 69 acres (28 ha) at an elevation of 480 feet (146 m) above mean sea level. It had one runway designated 8/26 with an asphalt surface measuring 3,087 by 30 feet (941 x 9 m).

For the 12-month period ending January 13, 2012, the airport had 18,820 aircraft operations, an average of 51 per day: 99.9% general aviation and 0.1% military. At that time there were 34 aircraft based at this airport: 88% single-engine, 6% multi-engine, and 6% helicopter.

The airport was home to the "Sky's The Limit" Skydiving Center, which operated six days a week (Wednesday to Monday) from April through November. The center regularly used a twin-turboprop de Havilland DHC-6 Twin Otter, a turboprop-powered Cessna 208 Caravan, and a piston-powered Cessna 182 Skylane — all configured for skydiving operations. The airport was also home to Lehigh Valley Health Network MedEvac 2. MedEvac 2 is the primary medical helicopter for Monroe, Pike, and Northampton Counties.

== See also ==
- List of airports in Pennsylvania
