= Bradford County Airport =

- IATA: none; ICAO: none; FAA LID: N27

Summary
- Airport type: Public
- Owner: Bradford County Airport Authority
- Serves: Towanda, Bradford County, Pennsylvania
- Location: Towanda Township, Pennsylvania
- Elevation AMSL: 730 ft (220 m)
- Coordinates: 41°44′24″N 076°26′50″W
- Website: BradfordCountyAirport.com
- Interactive map of Bradford County Airport

Runways
Direction	Length		Surface
Direction	ft	m	Surface
5/23	4,300	1,311	Asphalt

Statistics (2006)
- Aircraft operations: 23,100
- Source: FAA and airport website

Bradford County Airport (FAA LID: N27) is a public airport in Towanda Township, Bradford County, Pennsylvania located two miles (3.2 km) south of Towanda. It is owned by the Bradford County Airport Authority.

== Facilities ==
Bradford County Airport covers 250 acres (100 ha) and has one runway, (5/23), 4,300 ft × 75 ft (1,311 m × 23 m) asphalt. In the year ending September 30, 2006 the airport had 23,100 aircraft operations, average 63 per day: 99.6% general aviation and 0.4% military.

== See also ==
- List of airports in Pennsylvania
