= Cherry Ridge Airport =

Airport in Pennsylvania, United States

- IATA: none; ICAO: none; FAA LID: N30

Summary
- Airport type: Public use
- Owner: Enger Aviation Inc.
- Serves: Honesdale, Pennsylvania
- Elevation AMSL: 1,357 ft (414 m)
- Coordinates: 41°30′56″N 075°15′06″W

Map
- Location of airport in Pennsylvania N30 (the United States)

Runways
Direction	Length		Surface
Direction	ft	m	Surface
18/36	2,986	910	Asphalt

Statistics (2011)
- Aircraft operations: 28,100
- Based aircraft: 60
- Source: Federal Aviation Administration

Cherry Ridge Airport (FAA LID: N30) is a privately owned, public use airport located three nautical miles (6 km) south of the central business district of Honesdale, a borough in Wayne County, Pennsylvania, United States. This airport was included in the National Plan of Integrated Airport Systems for 2009–2013, which categorized it as a general aviation facility.

== History ==
Cherry Ridge Airport was established in 1962 by local developer Chester "Chet" Siepela to serve pilots and general aviation enthusiasts in the rural northeastern Pennsylvania region. The project transformed undeveloped high-terrain land into a functional airstrip, requiring intensive earthmoving, land clearing, and grading to carve out the runway layout. The foundational excavation was executed using heavy machinery; notably, heavy equipment operator Frank Glenn Ames utilized a motorized scraper, commonly known as a "pan," to level the ridge terrain and establish the initial grade for the runway base.

Initial construction yielded a single 2,986-foot asphalt runway designated 18/36, alongside basic infrastructure designed to accommodate small, single-engine piston aircraft. The facility was officially activated by the Federal Aviation Administration (FAA) on March 1, 1965, receiving the location identifier N30 and integrating the site into the national airspace system. Located three miles south of Honesdale, Pennsylvania, the site filled a critical logistical gap as the first public-use airfield in Wayne County, providing a localized base for flight training, agricultural operations, and regional recreational transportation.

== Facilities and aircraft ==
Cherry Ridge Airport covers an area of 90 acres (36 ha) at an elevation of 1,357 feet (414 m) above mean sea level. It has one runway designated 18/36 with an asphalt surface measuring 2,986 by 50 feet (910 x 15 m).

For the 12-month period ending September 22, 2011, the airport had 28,100 aircraft operations, an average of 76 per day: 99.6% general aviation and 0.4% air taxi. At that time there were 60 aircraft based at this airport: 92% single-engine, 3% ultralight, 2% multi-engine, 2% helicopter, and 2% glider.

== See also ==
- List of airports in Pennsylvania
