= Indian Lake Airport =

- IATA: none; ICAO: none; FAA LID: 5G2

Summary
- Airport type: Closed
- Owner/Operator: Indian Lake Airport, Inc.
- Location: Indian Lake, Pennsylvania
- Elevation AMSL: 2,442 ft / 744 m
- Coordinates: 40°03′20″N 078°50′46″W
- Interactive map of Indian Lake Airport

Runways
Direction	Length		Surface
Direction	ft	m	Surface
14/32	4,490	1,369	Asphalt

Indian Lake Airport (FAA LID: 5G2) is a privately owned, closed airport located in Indian Lake, Pennsylvania, United States.

The airport was constructed in 1966 to serve the growing community of Indian Lake. In its original configuration, it had a single paved northeast-southwest runway (4/22) measuring 3,000 feet (910 m). By 1975, the northwest-southeast runway, 14/32, had been added. The original runway was abandoned by 1993, and the entire airport was closed in 1999. As of 2006, the airport was listed for sale for US$7,000,000.

== Accidents ==
According to FAA records, there has been only one fatal accident involving Indian Lake Airport. On June 13, 1968, a student pilot attempting to land in instrument meteorological conditions crashed north of the airport. The NTSB concluded that the pilot had attempted operation beyond his ability level and experienced spatial disorientation.
