= Greater Pittsburgh =

Metropolitan area in the U.S. state of Pennsylvania

Greater Pittsburgh Pittsburgh, PA Metropolitan Statistical Area
- Metropolitan Statistical Area
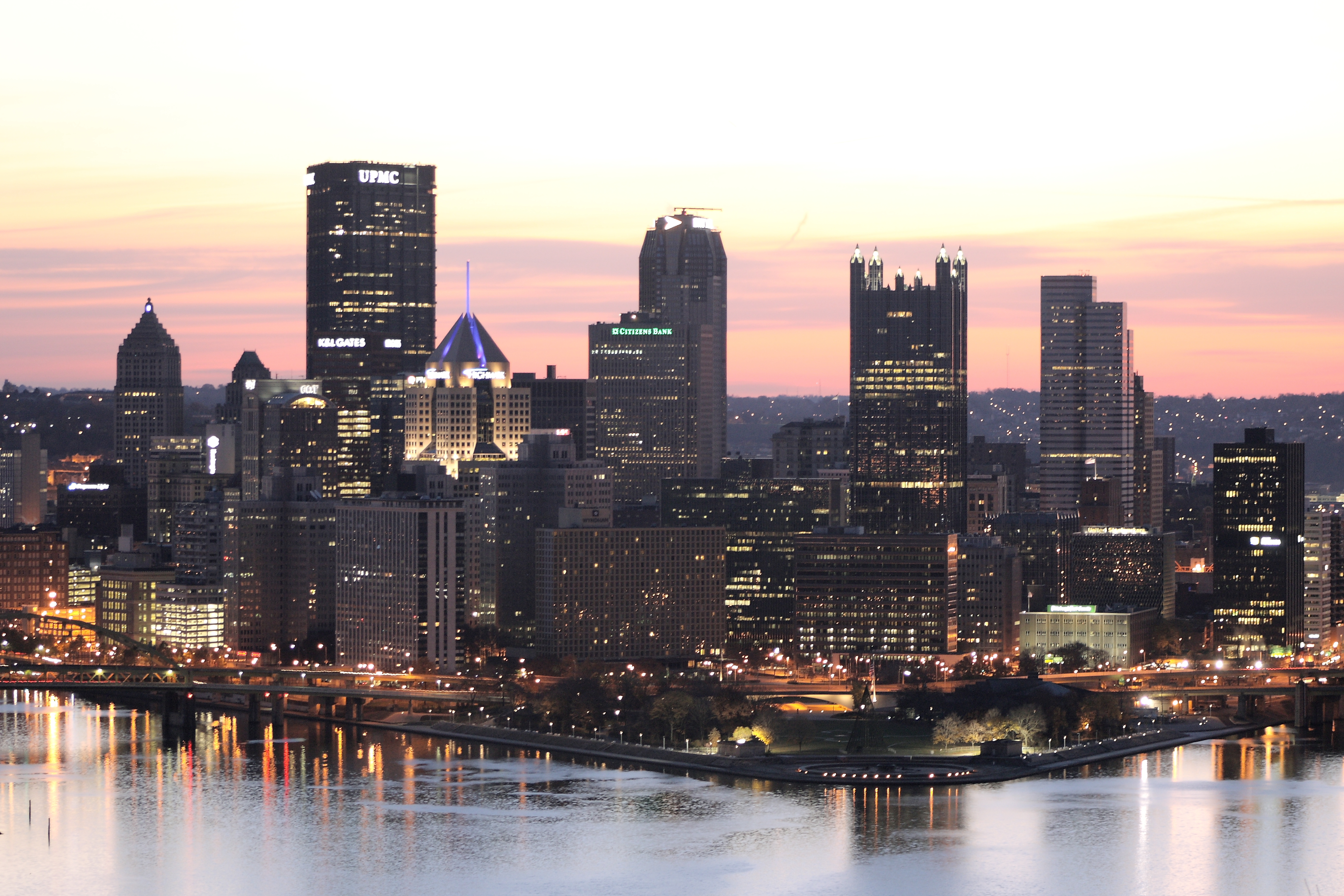
- Downtown Pittsburgh in November 2011
Pittsburgh–Weirton–Steubenville, PA–OH–WV CSA
City of Pittsburgh
Pittsburgh, PA MSA
Weirton–Steubenville, OH–WV MSA
Hermitage, PA µSA
Indiana, PA µSA
- Coordinates: 40°26′15″N 79°59′42″W
- Country: United States
- State: Pennsylvania; Ohio; West Virginia; Maryland
- Largest city: Pittsburgh

Population
  - Total: 2,457,000
  - Rank: 26th in the U.S.

GDP
  - MSA: $181.5 billion (2022)
- Time zone: UTC−05:00 (Eastern Standard Time)
  - Summer (DST): UTC−04:00 (Eastern Daylight Time)

Greater Pittsburgh is the metropolitan area surrounding the city of Pittsburgh in Western Pennsylvania, United States. The region includes Allegheny County, Pittsburgh's urban core county and economic hub, and seven adjacent Pennsylvania counties: Armstrong, Beaver, Butler, Fayette, Lawrence, Washington, and Westmoreland in Western Pennsylvania, which constitutes the Pittsburgh, PA Metropolitan Statistical Area MSA as defined by the U.S. Office of Management and Budget.

As of the 2020 census, the Greater Pittsburgh region had a population of over 2.45 million people. Pittsburgh, the region's core city, has a population of 302,971, the second-largest in the state after Philadelphia. Over half of the region's population resides within Allegheny County, which has a population of 1.24 million and is the state's second-largest county after Philadelphia County.

== Definitions ==
Historical population
Census	Pop.	Note	%±
1850	13,829		—
1860	178,831		1,193.2%
1870	262,204		46.6%
1880	355,869		35.7%
1890	664,778		86.8%
1900	1,083,846		63.0%
1910	1,471,800		35.8%
1920	1,759,989		19.6%
1930	2,023,269		15.0%
1940	2,062,556		1.9%
1950	2,213,236		7.3%
1960	2,768,938		25.1%
1970	2,759,443		−0.3%
1980	2,648,991		−4.0%
1990	2,468,289		−6.8%
2000	2,431,087		−1.5%
2010	2,356,285		−3.1%
2020	2,370,930		0.6%
U.S. Decennial Census; 1790–1960 1900–1990; 1990–2000

Garrett Nelson and Alasdair Rae's 2016 analysis of American commuter flows, "An Economic Geography of the United States: From Commutes to Megaregions", identified the Pittsburgh megaregion as a region encompassing the entirety or significant portions of 54 counties in Western Pennsylvania, Eastern Ohio, Northern West Virginia, and Western Maryland. By this definition, the informal regional boundaries are similar to historical interpretations where the region is defined as the central portion of the Allegheny Plateau to the west and north of the Allegheny Front and south of Lake Erie and Pennsylvania's Northern Tier. The hills and river valleys along the Upper Ohio River and its many eastern tributaries, including the Allegheny and Monongahela rivers have historically been the major centers of population of the region.

According to this research the US can be divided into 'mega regions' based on the most extreme commuting patterns within a geographical area (commutes within 100 miles from the core city). By this liberal definition, the Pittsburgh mega region consists of twenty-eight Pennsylvania counties (Allegheny, Armstrong, Beaver, Bedford, Blair, Butler, Cambria, Cameron, Centre, Clarion, Clearfield, Crawford, Elk, Erie, Fayette, Forest, Greene, Huntingdon, Indiana, Jefferson, Lawrence, Mercer, Mifflin, Somerset, Venango, Warren, Washington, and Westmoreland), nineteen West Virginia counties (Barbour, Brooke, Doddridge, Grant, Hancock, Harrison, Lewis, Marion, Marshall, Mineral, Monongalia, Ohio, Preston, Randolph, Taylor, Tucker, Tyler, Upshur, and Wetzel), five Ohio counties (Belmont, Columbiana, Harrison, Jefferson, and Monroe), and two Maryland counties (Allegany and Garrett), and portions of Chautauqua, New York in and around Ripley. The combined population of the megaregion was over 4.9 million in 2016.

Border of Pittsburgh Megaregion showing included counties

There are also several formal definitions of Greater Pittsburgh which are often used in media mentions of the region. These include the Office of Management and Budget's Pittsburgh, PA Metropolitan Statistical Area (MSA) and Pittsburgh-New Castle-Weirton, PA-OH-WV Combined Statistical Area (CSA). The Nielsen Corporation's Pittsburgh Designated Market Area (DMA) is another commonly used formal definition of the region. There are nineteen counties included in at least one of these definitions and their combined population was over 2.9 million in 2016.

Greater Pittsburgh Counties by Formal Definitions
County	State	Formal Definition			Population (2016)
County	State	MSA	CSA	DMA	Population (2016)
Allegheny	PA	Yes	Yes	Yes	1,225,365
Armstrong	PA	Yes	Yes	Yes	66,486
Beaver	PA	Yes	Yes	Yes	167,429
Brooke	WV	No	Yes	No	22,977
Butler	PA	Yes	Yes	Yes	186,847
Clarion	PA	No	No	Yes	38,513
Fayette	PA	Yes	Yes	Yes	132,733
Forest	PA	No	No	Yes	7,321
Garrett	MD	No	No	Yes	29,425
Greene	PA	No	No	Yes	37,197
Hancock	WV	No	Yes	No	29,590
Indiana	PA	No	Yes	Yes	86,364
Jefferson	OH	No	Yes	No	66,704
Lawrence	PA	Yes	Yes	Yes	87,294
Mercer	PA	No	Yes	Yes	109,972
Monongalia	WV	No	No	Yes	104,622
Preston	WV	No	No	Yes	33,758
Venango	PA	No	No	Yes	52,582
Washington	PA	Yes	Yes	Yes	207,981
Westmoreland	PA	Yes	Yes	Yes	355,458
Total Population					2,938,646

== Economy ==
Historically, Pittsburgh has been grouped in the "Rust Belt"; however, reflective of the rebound of the region within the last generation, the metro area has been included as a part of the "Great Lakes Basin" gaining representation in the Great Lakes Metro Chamber Coalition.

Pittsburgh's association with the Great Lakes region is due in part to its economic, demographic and commuter connections to Great Lakes cities like Cleveland, Erie, Toledo and even Detroit. Christopher Briem, an economist at the University of Pittsburgh's University Center for Social and Urban Research, has argued that southwestern Pennsylvania is "far more interconnected" with northeastern Ohio than it is with the eastern half of Pennsylvania, and that the industries of Pittsburgh are primarily linked to Ohioan cities such as Youngstown, Akron, and Cleveland, not to Pennsylvanian cities such as Allentown, Scranton, or Philadelphia. He notes that, conversely, the population centers of northeastern Ohio are primarily connected with Pittsburgh and only secondarily connected to the state capital of Columbus. Briem argues that "In so many ways the state boundaries we think of as important are no more than lines on a map." In recognizing their economic interdependence, Briem coined the term "Cleveburgh" to refer collectively to the cities of Cleveland and Pittsburgh, along with the smaller towns dotting the corridor of I-76 between the cities. Robert Lang and Arthur Nelson of the Metropolitan Institute at Virginia Tech also identify the region between Cleveland and Pittsburgh as being an interconnected "megapolitan area" and refer to it as the "Steel Corridor".

== Education ==
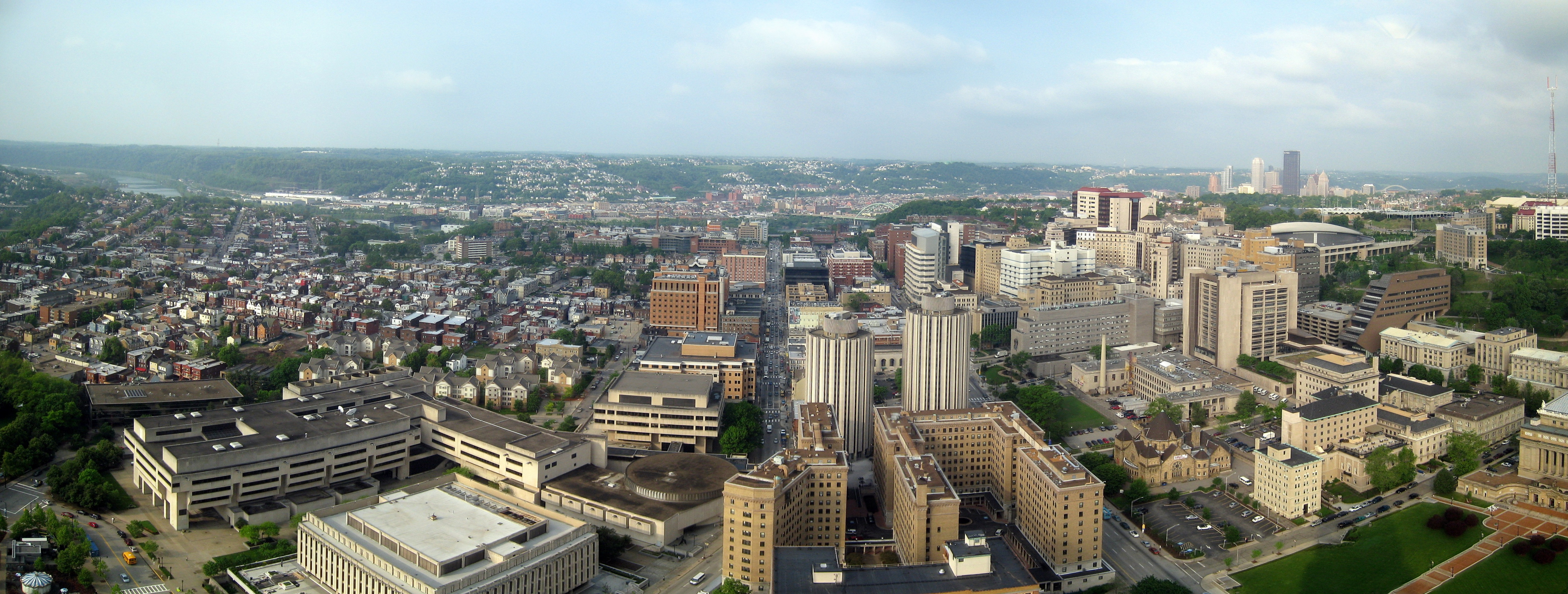
The campus of the University of Pittsburgh in the Oakland neighborhood of Pittsburgh

The largest school district in the area is the Pittsburgh Public Schools, with the school districts of Allegheny County also boasting large student bodies. Many private schools also serve the core county of Allegheny. More public districts are found throughout Beaver, Westmoreland, and Washington counties, and private schools in each county.

Several area colleges and universities serve the region. Pittsburgh itself is home to many colleges, universities, and research facilities, the most well-known of which are Carnegie Mellon University, the University of Pittsburgh, and Duquesne University. Also in the city are Carlow University, Chatham University, Point Park University, the Community College of Allegheny County, Pittsburgh Theological Seminary, Reformed Presbyterian Theological Seminary, and the Pittsburgh Institute of Mortuary Science. Within the greater metropolitan area, universities include Clarion University of Pennsylvania, La Roche University, Slippery Rock University, Westminster College and Grove City College north of the city, Robert Morris University and Geneva College west of the city, Washington & Jefferson College, Pennsylvania Western University and Waynesburg University to the south, and Seton Hill University, Saint Vincent College, Westmoreland County Community College and Indiana University of Pennsylvania to the east.

== Transportation ==
=== Airports ===
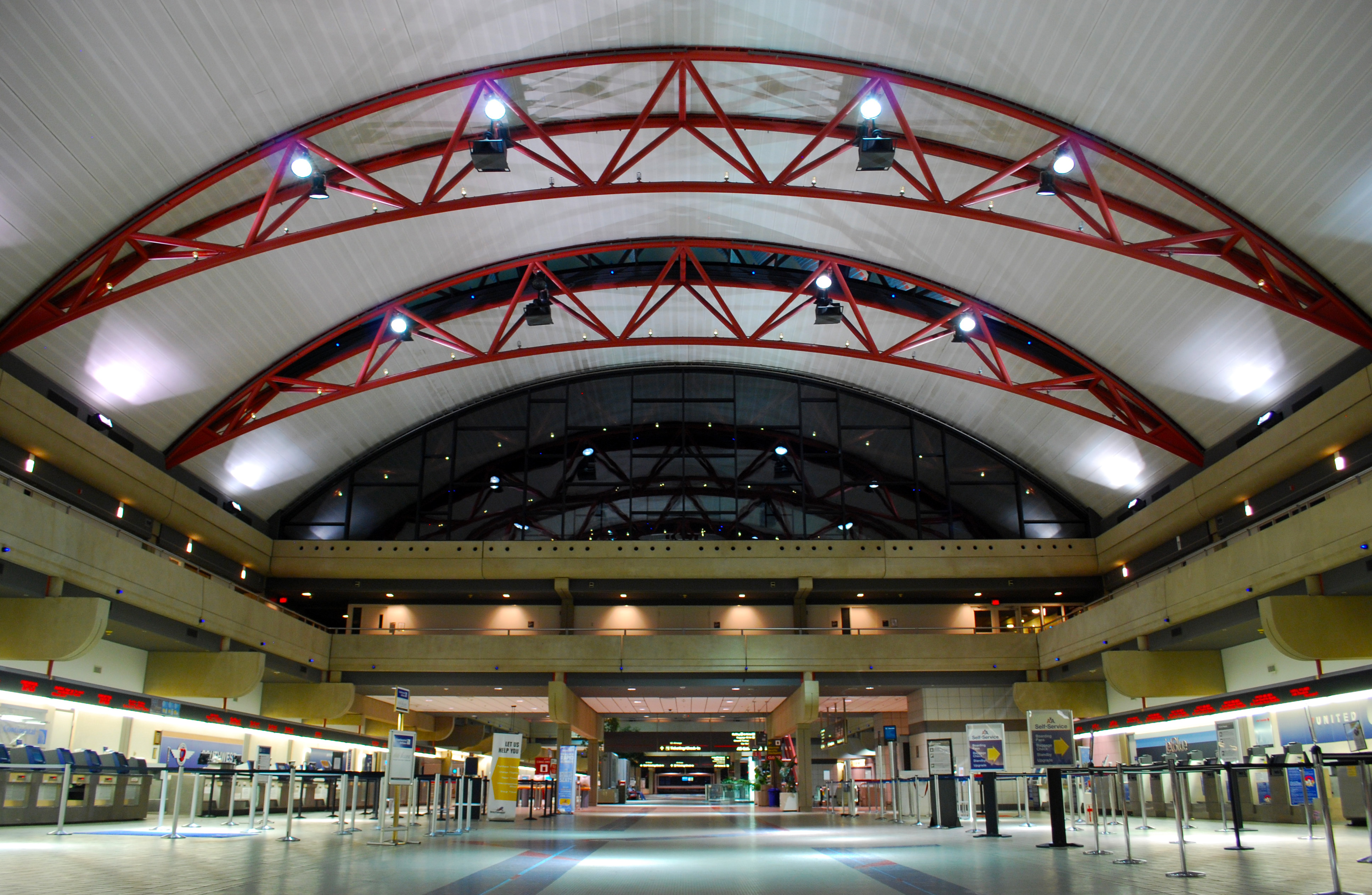
Pittsburgh International Airport's former Landside Terminal, this terminal closed in November 2025.

Pittsburgh International Airport is located 17 mi (27 km) to the west of downtown Pittsburgh in Findlay. The smaller but less crowded Arnold Palmer Regional Airport to the east of downtown in Latrobe provides commercial service to the metro area.

Pittsburgh International was the fortress hub of US Airways from 1952 to 2005 with over 500 daily departures to more than 110 destinations in 2000. By 2007, fewer than 70 departures to 21 destinations remained. In 2007, US Airways did select the airport for its new $25 million, 27,000 sq ft (2,500 m^{2}), 600-employees-strong Global Flight Operations Center. Since being de-hubbed the airport has seen expanded service from JetBlue, Southwest Airlines and Delta Air Lines' direct trans-Atlantic service to Paris.

Arnold Palmer Regional Airport formerly offered commercial service via Spirit Airlines to Florida and South Carolina until the airline's closure in 2026.

Allegheny County Airport in suburban West Mifflin, Pennsylvania, is the area's largest general aviation airport. The historic landmark, art deco terminal was the main passenger airport for the area until 1952. Allegheny opened in 1931 as the nation's third-largest and first with "hard surface" runways.

Smaller suburban airports serve as private plane and corporate jet bases include:

- North Metro:
  - Butler County Airport
  - Zelienople Municipal Airport
  - Rock Airport
  - New Castle Municipal Airport
  - Lakehill Airport
  - Grove City Airport
- South Metro:
  - Allegheny County Airport
  - Rostraver Airport
  - Joseph A. Hardy Connellsville Airport
  - Washington County Airport
- East Metro:
  - Pittsburgh-Monroeville Airport
  - Greensburg Jeannette Regional Airport
  - Indiana County-Jimmy Stewart Airport
  - Arnold Palmer Regional Airport
- West Metro:
  - Beaver County Airport
  - Eddie Dew Memorial Airpark (Ohio)
  - Jefferson County Airpark (Ohio)
  - Herron Airport (West Virginia)
  - Wheeling Airport (West Virginia)

=== Interstates ===
The Pittsburgh area is served by four main-line Interstates including the Pennsylvania Turnpike (which is co-signed with I-76 and in the extreme eastern part of the region also co-signed with I-70):

- I-70
- I-76 / Penna Turnpike
- I-79
- I-80

It's also served by several Interstate spur routes:

- I-376
- I-576 (future)
- I-279
- I-579

=== Other expressways ===
- US 22 serving west area commuters from Steubenville, Ohio, through West Virginia and into the metro area of Washington County, Pennsylvania, and into Allegheny merging into I-376. It leaves I-376 in Monroeville and continues into Murrysville, Westmorland County, while continuing east towards Altoona and beyond.
- US 30 in the Greensburg area and co-signed with I-376 and US 22 through the city and western suburbs continuing into West Virginia and Ohio.
- US 119
- US 422
- SR 7 along the Ohio River in Jefferson County, Ohio.
- PA 28 serving the Allegheny Valley commuters in the Northeast and through suburban Armstrong County.
- PA Turnpike 43 (Mon–Fayette Expressway) a 70 mile long interstate grade route between the South Hills and West Virginia.
- PA 65 serving commuters along the Ohio River valley to the northwest of the city.
- PA Turnpike 66 (Amos K. Hutchinson Bypass) as a partial east hills beltway for traffic from both Interstate 70 and the Pennsylvania Turnpike/Interstate 76.
- Fort Duquesne Boulevard serving as a downtown expressway between I-279 and I-579.

=== Port ===
The Port of Pittsburgh ranks as the 21st-largest port in the United States with almost 34 million short tons of river cargo in 2011. It is the 9th-largest in the U.S. when measured in domestic trade.

=== Mass transit ===
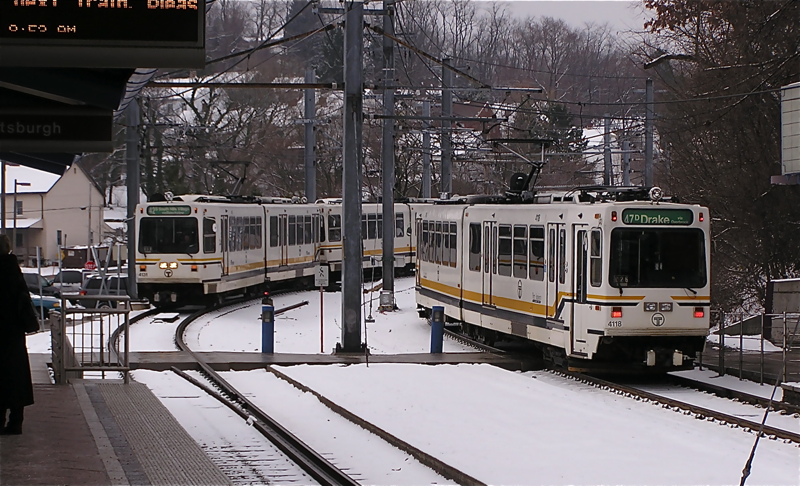
Pittsburgh Regional Transit light rail train at Washington Junction station in Bethel Park, Pennsylvania in March 2005

The Pittsburgh Regional Transit agency (PRT) is the largest mass transit service in the metro area and includes a 26-mile subway/light rail system, all serving the central core. This system is complemented by the Butler Transit Authority and Town & Country Transit to north destinations, Beaver County Transit Authority and New Castle Area Transit Authority to northwest destinations, Westmoreland County Transit Authority and IndiGo to eastern destinations, and Washington City Transit, Mid Mon Valley Transit Authority and Fayette Area Coordinated Transportation serving southern destinations. The University of Pittsburgh Transportation System also provides services in the eastern core of the metropolitan area while Mountain Line Transit serves the city, western suburbs and an express route south to Morgantown, West Virginia.

A metro map of all fixed route transit routes for Pennsylvania counties can be found here.

=== Rail ===
Amtrak serves the region with stops at Penn Station in Downtown Pittsburgh, Connellsville to the southeast and both Greensburg and Latrobe to the east.

Freight rail is a major industry for the area with the Pittsburgh Line and the Conway Yard among other infrastructure serving the region.

=== Interstate bus ===
Both the Greyhound Lines and Megabus serve the area.

=== Recreation and rail trails ===
- Deckers Creek Trail
- Great Allegheny Passage
- Mon River Trail
- Montour Trail
- Ohio River Trail
- Ohio River Water Trail
- Panhandle Trail
- Stavich Bike Trail
- Three Rivers Heritage Trail
- West Penn Trail
- Western Maryland Rail Trail
- Westmoreland Heritage Trail
- Wheeling Heritage Trails

== Culture ==
Pittsburgh and its surrounding area has a distinct regional identity and has historically been regarded as a transitional region within the Northeastern United States. The region's counties also fall within the borders of Appalachia as defined by the Appalachian Regional Commission. The City of Pittsburgh has been characterized as the "northern urban industrial anchor of Appalachia"^{:} which makes it an anomaly compared to much of Appalachia which has traditionally been characterized as southern, rural, and economically distressed.

Joseph Scarpaci, professor emeritus of geography at Virginia Tech, has described Pittsburgh as having "one foot in the East...and the other in the Midwest". Barbara Johnstone, professor of rhetoric and linguistics at Carnegie Mellon University, ascribes this isolation and idiosyncratic cultural identity of the region to the difficulty of moving through the Allegheny Mountains and the Allegheny Plateau.

The Pittsburgh area was sort of isolated. It was very hard to get back and forth across the mountains. There's always been a sense that Pittsburgh was kind of a place unto itself—not really southern, not really Midwestern, not really part of Pennsylvania. People just didn't move very much.

In his 2009 book, The Paris of Appalachia, Pittsburgh Post-Gazette writer Brian O'Neill meditates on this aspect of Pittsburgh's regional and cultural ambiguity. The title of the book is intentionally provocative:

"The Paris of Appalachia" some have called Pittsburgh derisively, because it's still the largest city along this gorgeous mountain chain that needs a better press agent. I've long felt we should embrace that title, though few are with me. Several tried to talk me out of slapping it on the cover, but were we called "The Paris of the Rockies," we wouldn't run from it. Sometimes we're so afraid of what others think, we're afraid to say who we are. This city is not Midwestern. It's not East Coast. It's just Pittsburgh, and there's no place like it. That's both its blessing and its curse.

=== Arts ===
==== Visual arts ====
Greater Pittsburgh is home to several museums, galleries, and organizations which promote appreciation for the visual arts. The largest art museum in the region is the Carnegie Museum of Art, founded in 1895 by industrialist Andrew Carnegie and located in Pittsburgh's Oakland neighborhood. It is renowned for its collections of 19th and 20th century decorative art, Japanese prints, and old master prints. Contemporary art museums include the Mattress Factory and the Andy Warhol Museum, both located on Pittsburgh's North Side.

Other regional visual arts museums include:

- Frick Art and Historical Center (Point Breeze, Pittsburgh)
- Contemporary Craft (Strip District, Pittsburgh)
- ToonSeum (Downtown, Pittsburgh)
- Westmoreland Museum of American Art (Greensburg)
- Southern Alleghenies Museum of Art (Multiple locations - Loretto, Ligonier Valley, Johnstown, and Altoona)
- The Maridon Museum (Butler)
- University Museum at Indiana University of Pennsylvania (Indiana)
- Hoyt Institute of Fine Arts (New Castle)
- Venango Museum of Art, Science, and Industry (Oil City)
- Palmer Museum of Art (University Park)
- Erie Art Museum (Erie)
- Juniata College Museum of Art (Huntingdon)
- Art Museum of West Virginia University (Morgantown)

=== Sports and recreation ===
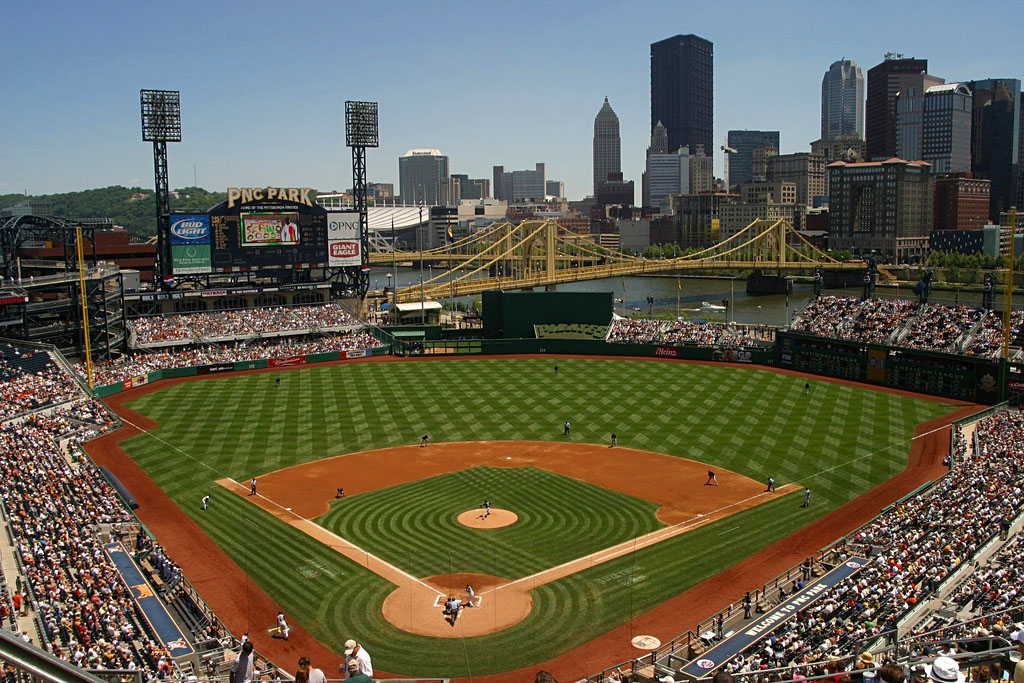
PNC Park in the North Shore neighborhood, home of the Pittsburgh Pirates baseball team since 2001

The Pittsburgh area served as a launchpad for the professionalization of both American football and ice hockey in the 1890s and 1900s. The first professional player (William Heffelfinger) played for a Pittsburgh football team in 1892, which was followed by the first open professional (John Brallier), the first all-professional team (the Latrobe Athletic Association), and a participant in the first all-professional league (the Pittsburgh Stars of the first National Football League). In the case of ice hockey, the Western Pennsylvania Hockey League was the first hockey league to pay its players in 1901, eventually merging into the first fully pro league, the International Professional Hockey League, in 1904. Professional hockey in Pennsylvania predated the professionalization of the game in Canada (where it eventually came to dominate in the early 20th century) by four years.

Today, the region is home to three major league franchises in baseball, football, and hockey; several minor league teams in soccer, baseball, and hockey; and three major NCAA universities.

Pittsburgh area teams
Club	Sport	League (Conf)	Venue	Location
Pittsburgh Pirates	Baseball	MLB	PNC Park	Pittsburgh
Pittsburgh Steelers	American football	NFL	Acrisure Stadium	Pittsburgh
Pittsburgh Penguins	Ice hockey	NHL	PPG Paints Arena	Pittsburgh
Pittsburgh Riverhounds	Soccer	USL	Highmark Stadium	Pittsburgh
Washington Wildthings	Baseball	Frontier League	Consol Energy Park	Washington
Wheeling Nailers	Ice hockey	ECHL	WesBanco Arena	Wheeling
University of Pittsburgh Panthers	various	NCAA (ACC)	various	Pittsburgh
Duquesne University Dukes	various	NCAA (A-10, NEC)	various	Pittsburgh
Robert Morris University Colonials	various	NCAA (Horizon)	various	Moon
Indiana University of Pennsylvania Crimson Hawks	various	NCAA (PSAC)	various	Indiana
Pennsylvania Western University, California Vulcans	various	NCAA (PSAC)	various	California
Slippery Rock University of Pennsylvania The Rock	various	NCAA (PSAC)	various	Slippery Rock
Franciscan University of Steubenville Barons	various	NCAA (AMCC)	various	Steubenville
West Liberty University Hilltoppers	various	NCAA (MEC)	various	West Liberty
Wheeling Cardinals	various	NCAA (MEC)	various	Wheeling
Seton Hill University Griffins	various	NCAA (PSAC)	various	Greensburg
Carnegie Mellon University Tartans	various	NCAA (PAC)	various	Pittsburgh
Saint Vincent College Bearcats	various	NCAA (PAC, ECAC)	various	Latrobe
Geneva College Golden Tornadoes	various	NCAA (PAC)	various	Beaver Falls
Chatham University Cougars	various	NCAA (PAC)	various	Pittsburgh
Washington & Jefferson College Presidents	various	NCAA (PAC)	various	Washington
Westminster College Titans	various	NCAA (PAC)	various	New Wilmington
Bethany College Bison	various	NCAA (PAC)	various	Bethany
Grove City College Wolverines	various	NCAA (PAC)	various	Grove City

==== Golf ====
Golf in the metro area boasts such courses as Oakmont Country Club, which has hosted the U.S. Open a record ten times. Foxburg Country Club is the oldest continuous club in the U.S. Such tournaments as the 84 Lumber Classic, Pittsburgh Senior Open and the current Mylan Classic call the region home. Area courses have also hosted multiple PGA Championships, LPGA Championships, U.S. Women's Opens and Ryder Cup matches.

==== Annual sports events ====
Annual sporting events include the Head of the Ohio crew race, Three Rivers Regatta, Pittsburgh Vintage Grand Prix, and the Pittsburgh Marathon.

The regions rivers have hosted the Bassmaster Classic and Forrest Wood Cup and the city has enjoyed having one of only two teams to host the Major League Baseball All Star Game a record eight times. The area has also hosted the NHL All Star Game, NHL Winter Classic, Senior Olympics, NHL entry draft, AHL All Star Game, NCAA Tournament and Frozen Four.

Winter in the region sees sport continue at such rinks at PPG Place and North Park as well as area ski resorts like Boyce Park, Seven Springs Mountain Resort, Hidden Valley, Laurel Mountain and Wisp.

== Politics ==
Due to the heavy industrial and union presences in the area, Greater Pittsburgh was for decades a stronghold for the Democratic Party. In recent years, owing to the de-industrialization of the area, the exurban areas surrounding Allegheny County have shifted strongly to the Republican Party. Said shift has been accelerated due to several residents of the region adhering to social conservatism, in spite of the area's continued liberal views on economic issues. Nevertheless, at the turn of the 21st century, Allegheny County remains the most consistently Democratic of the counties that make up Greater Pittsburgh, with the city of Pittsburgh and surrounding suburban municipalities remaining strongly Democratic.

Greater Pittsburgh Presidential election results (MSA Counties only)
Year	Democratic	Republican	Third parties
2024	47.4% 671,848	51.8% 734,418	0.8% 12,009
2020	47.7% 668,573	50.8% 712,747	1.5% 20,518
2016	45.0% 563,858	50.6% 633,488	4.4% 55,154
2012	48.5% 570,888	50.0% 588,513	1.4% 17,027
2008	50.5% 621,470	48.0% 591,836	1.5% 21,905
2004	51.7% 629,679	47.7% 580,648	0.6% 7,409
2000	52.6% 570,550	44.6% 483,639	2.8% 30,451

== See also ==
- Western Pennsylvania
- Northwest Pennsylvania
- Pittsburgh Media Market
- Pennsylvania census statistical areas
- List of Pennsylvania metropolitan areas
