= Cumberland Terminal Subdivision =

Railroad line in Maryland, US

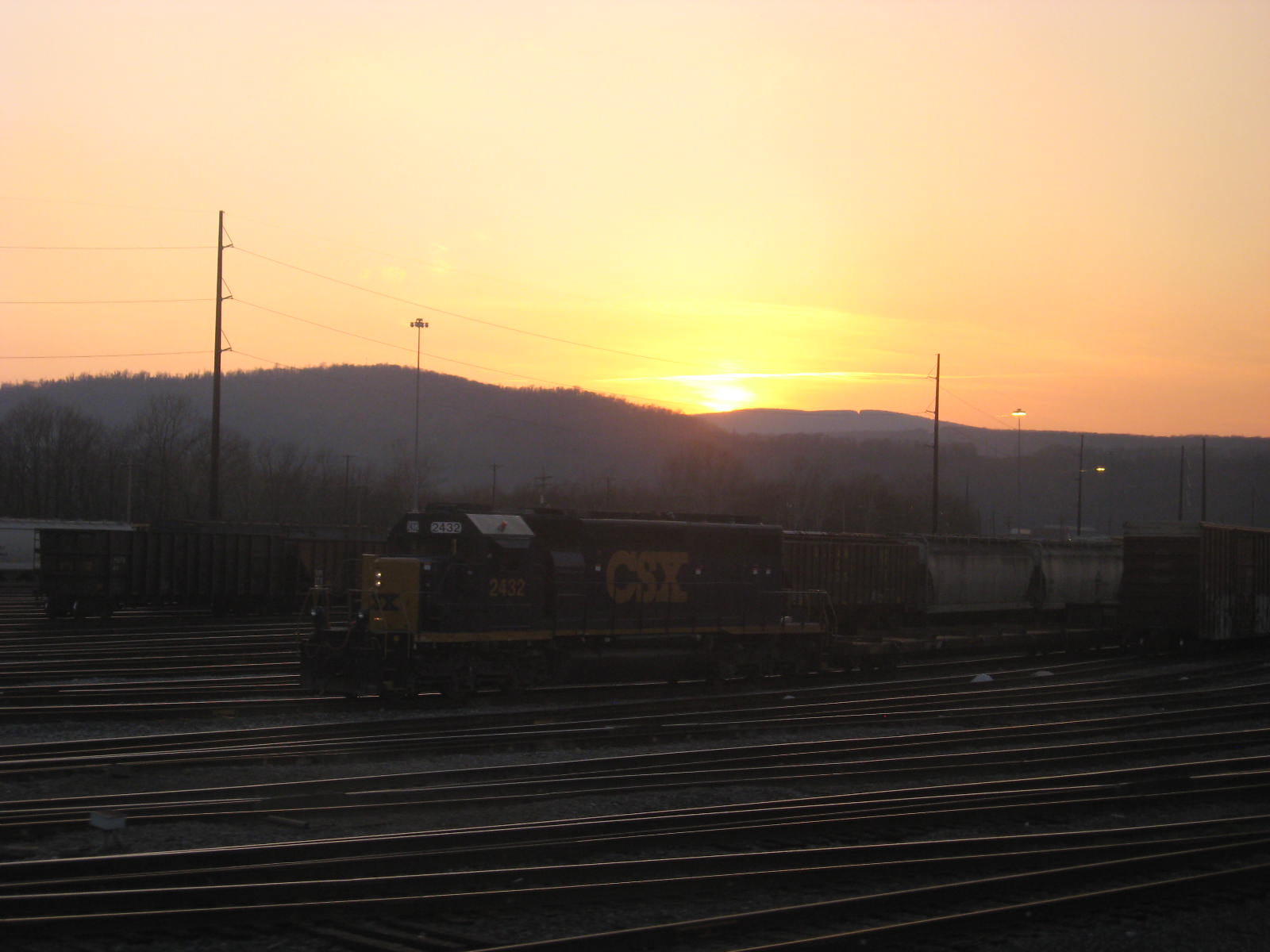
- CSX Locomotive waiting at the Cumberland Terminal

Overview
- Status: Active
- Owner: CSX Transportation
- Locale: Cumberland, Maryland

Service
- Type: Freight rail
- System: CSX Transportation
- Operator(s): CSX Transportation

Technical
- Line length: 5.5 mi
- Number of tracks: 2+
- Track gauge: 4 ft 8 1/2 in (1,435 mm) standard gauge

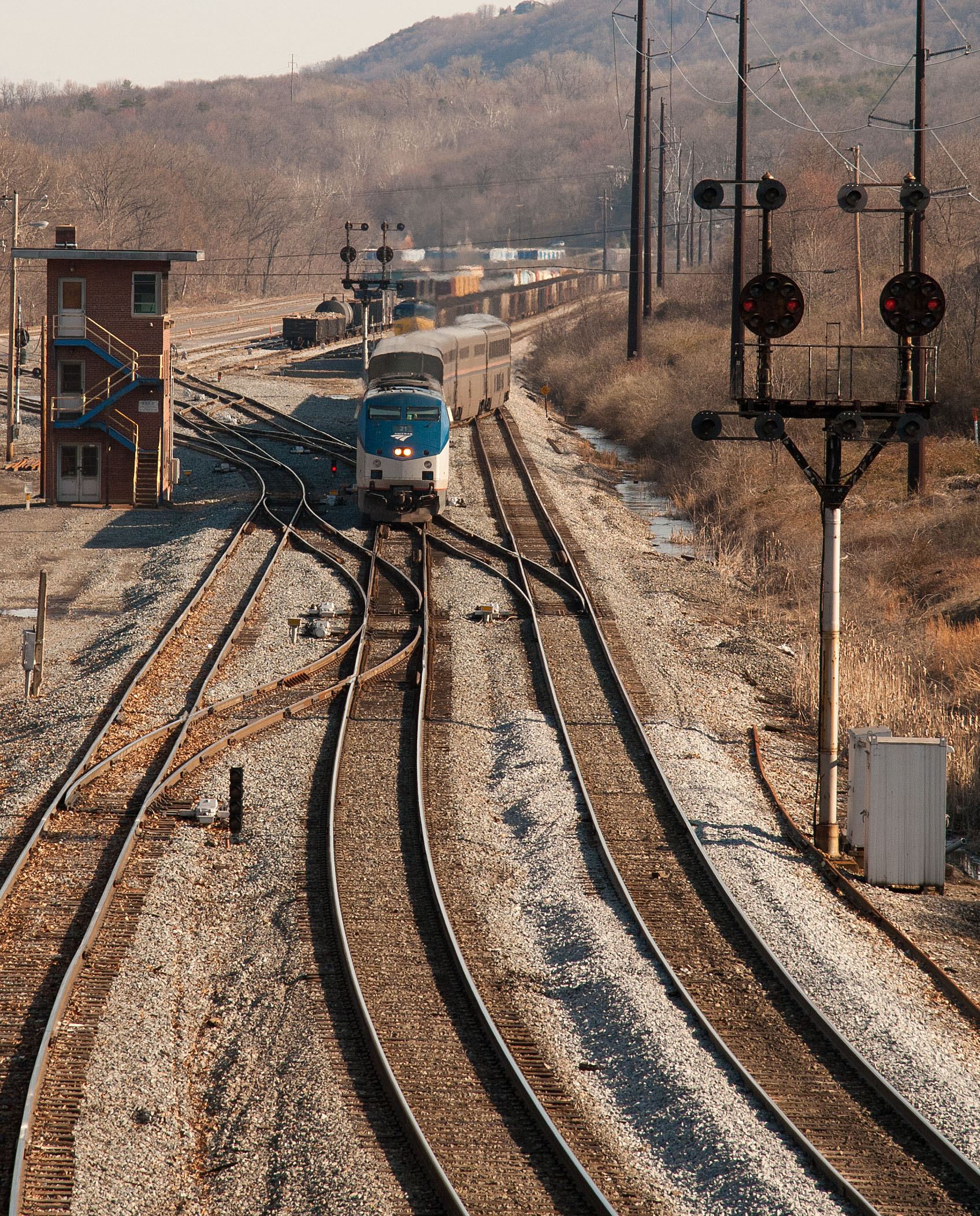
The Amtrak Capitol Limited passes through Cumberland Yard on its way to Washington, D.C. In the background are CSX freight trains. On the left is Mexico Tower, a closed interlocking tower.

The Cumberland Terminal Subdivision is a railroad line owned and operated by CSX Transportation in the Cumberland, Maryland area. The line centers on the Cumberland rail yard and is a junction with three other subdivisions.

The line was built by the Baltimore and Ohio Rail Road (B&O) in the 1850s as part of its original main line, known then as the "West End." To the east it connects with the Cumberland Subdivision leading to Washington, D.C., and Baltimore. To the west it joins the Keystone Subdivision heading towards Pittsburgh, Pennsylvania. To the southwest it joins the Mountain Subdivision leading to Grafton, West Virginia.

== Yard and shop facilities ==
The Cumberland rail yard complex originally included a large classification yard and an engine shop. The B&O opened its Westward Transportation Yard in Cumberland in 1960. The yard is 3.5 miles (5.6 km) long and occupies 95 acres (0.38 km^{2}). It includes a 7-track receiving yard, a 33-track hump classification yard with automatic retarders and switching, car inspection and repair facilities, and other support buildings. CSX converted the yard to remote operation in 2004, and classified 1,000 to 1,400 cars per day in 2010. In 2017 CSX converted the yard to flat switching and closed the hump operations.

== Passenger stations ==
The B&O built a large passenger station in Cumberland, the Queen City Hotel, in 1871, shortly after completion of a rail line to Pittsburgh. Passenger traffic on the line declined in the mid-20th century, and the station was demolished in 1972. Today the smaller Amtrak depot is located on the line, in the downtown area west of the yard.

== CSX acquisition ==
During the 1970s the B&O was controlled by the Chesapeake and Ohio Railway, and the two companies (along with the Western Maryland Railway) operated under the single corporate identify of the Chessie System. The Western Maryland Railway once had two extensive yards in the Cumberland area but these were phased out in favor of the ex B&O Cumberland Terminal. The Chessie companies were merged into CSX in 1987.

== See also ==
- Old Main Line Subdivision - CSX line to Baltimore
- List of CSX Transportation lines
