= FWQ =

FWQ may refer to:

- Flight West, a defunct Australian air line
- Rostraver Airport, in Pennsylvania, United States
