= Greensburg station =

Railroad station in Greensburg, Pennsylvania

Greensburg, PA
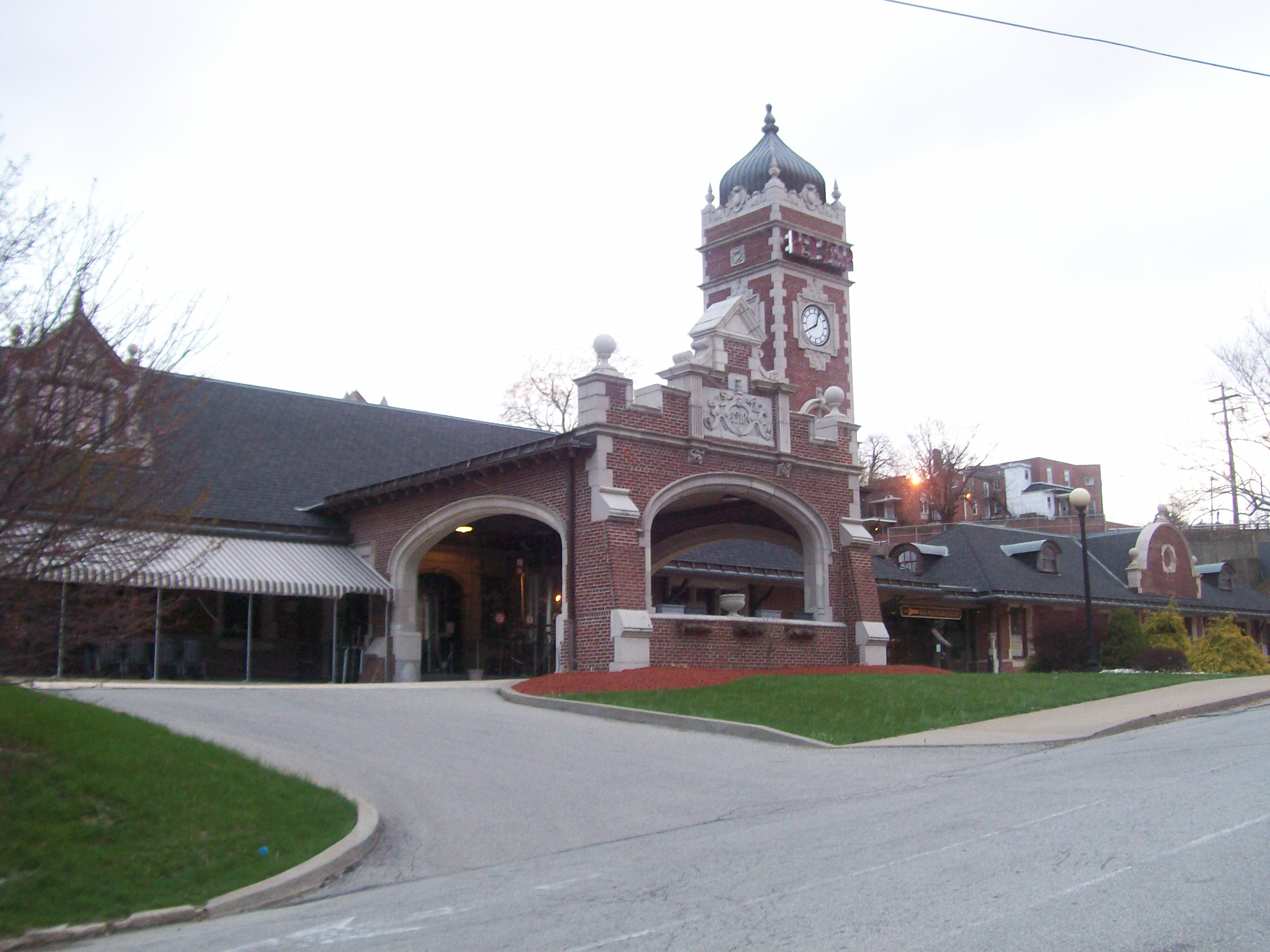
- Greensburg station in 2007

General information
- Location: Harrison Avenue and Seton Hill Drive; Greensburg, Pennsylvania; United States
- Coordinates: 40°18′16″N 79°32′48″W
- Owner: StoneKim Properties LLC
- Line: NS Pittsburgh Line (Keystone Corridor)
- Platforms: 2 side platforms
- Tracks: 2
- Connections: Westmoreland County Transit Authority; Greyhound

Construction
- Accessible: Yes

Other information
- Station code: Amtrak: GNB

History
- Rebuilt: 1912, 1995

Passengers
- FY 2025: 12,784 (Amtrak)

Services
Preceding station	Amtrak	Following station
Pittsburgh Terminus	Pennsylvanian	Latrobe toward New York
Former services
Preceding station	Amtrak	Following station
Pittsburgh toward Chicago	Three Rivers 1995–2005	Latrobe toward New York
Pittsburgh toward Chicago	Broadway Limited Until 1995	Johnstown toward New York
Wilkinsburg toward Kansas City	National Limited	Latrobe toward New York or Washington, D.C.
Pitcairn toward Pittsburgh	Fort Pitt	Latrobe toward Altoona
Preceding station	Pennsylvania Railroad	Following station
Radebaugh toward Chicago	Main Line	Donohoe toward New York or Exchange Place
Terminus	Hempfield Branch	County Home Junction toward Gratztown
Preceding station	PennDOT	Following station
Jeanette toward Pittsburgh	Parkway Limited	Terminus
- Greensburg Railroad Station
- U.S. National Register of Historic Places
- Pittsburgh Landmark – PHLF
- Coordinates: 40°18′16″N 79°32′48″W
- Built: 1911
- Architect: William H. Cookman
- Architectural style: Jacobean Revival
- NRHP reference No.: 77001202

Significant dates
- Added to NRHP: November 7, 1977
- Designated PHLF: 2014
Location

Greensburg station is an Amtrak railway station located approximately 30 miles (48 km) east of Pittsburgh at Harrison Avenue and Seton Hill Drive in Greensburg, Pennsylvania. The station is located just north of the city center. It is served by the two daily round trips of the Pennsylvanian. The station has been listed on the National Register of Historic Places since 1977.

== History ==
Postcard of the pre-1912 station

The station was opened in 1912 by the Pennsylvania Railroad as part of a project to elevate the right-of-way as it passed through Greensburg. William Holmes Cookman served as architect. The depot is constructed of red brick laid in a Flemish bond pattern with stone trim and quoins on the building's corners; the overall architectural style is Jacobean Revival. A copper ogee dome with a finial tops a tall square clock tower. Ornamented parapets with center cartouches and corner finials surround the dome.

From March to November 1981, the station was the eastern terminus of PennDOT's Parkway Limited train, which took commuters to Pittsburgh. Until 2005, Greensburg was served by the Three Rivers (a replacement service for the Broadway Limited), an extended version of the Pennsylvanian that terminated in Chicago. Its cancellation marked the first time in Greensburg's railway history that a single daily passenger train served the town. The small shelter that serves as the present station has no ticket office.

The historic station now houses a restaurant.

Westmoreland County Transit Authority's transit center is approximately 0.3 miles (0.48 km) south of the train station. All WCTA bus routes pass through the transit center. Greyhound also has a stop at the transit center.

Design work for accessibility improvements at the station was completed in early 2025. As of April 2025, construction is expected to begin in 2026.
