= Joseph A. Hardy Connellsville Airport =

Joseph A. Hardy Connellsville Airport Connellsville Municipal Airport
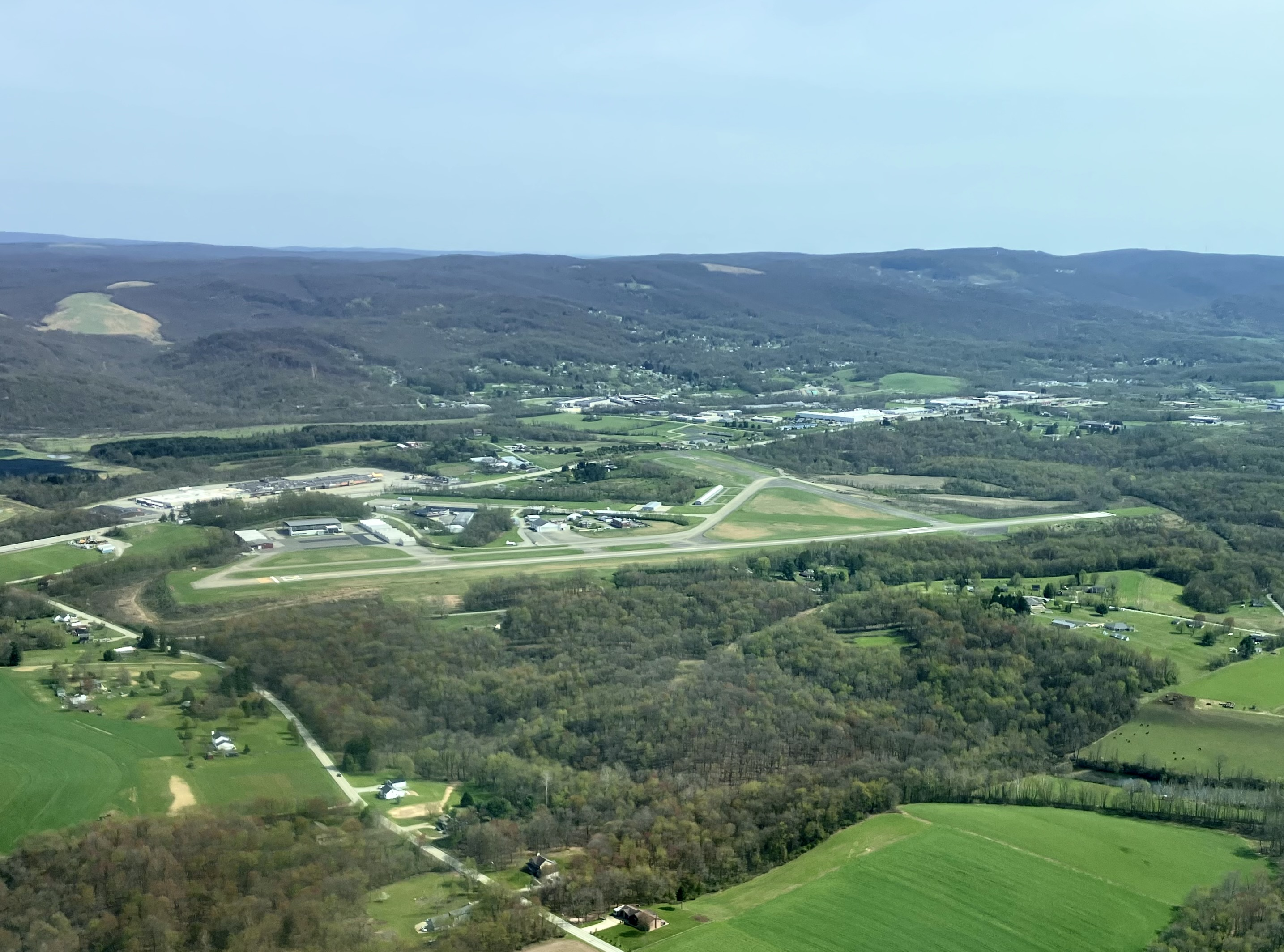
- Airport in 2025 from 1000ft above the surface
- IATA: none; ICAO: KVVS; FAA LID: VVS

Summary
- Airport type: Public
- Owner/Operator: Fayette County Airport Authority
- Serves: Connellsville, Pennsylvania, U.S.
- Location: Dunbar Township, Fayette County, Pennsylvania
- Elevation AMSL: 1,264 ft (385 m)
- Coordinates: 39°57′33″N 079°39′26″W

Maps
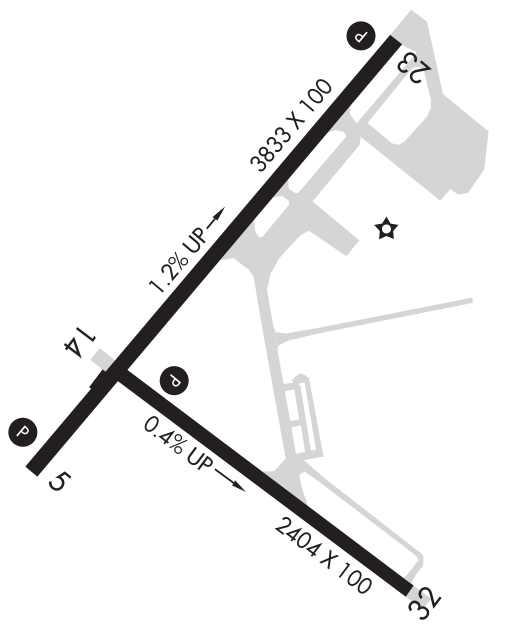

- Location of Joseph A. Hardy Connellsville Airport KVVS (the United States)

Runways
Direction	Length		Surface
Direction	ft	m	Surface
5/23	3,833	1,168	Asphalt
14/32	2,404	733	Asphalt

Statistics (2019)
- Aircraft operations (year ending 11/19/2019): 30,660
- Based aircraft: 25
- Source: Federal Aviation Administration

Joseph A. Hardy Connellsville Airport (ICAO: KVVS, FAA LID: VVS, formerly 2G3) is a public-use airport located four nautical miles (7 km) southwest of Connellsville in Dunbar Township, Fayette County, Pennsylvania, United States. It is owned by the Fayette County Airport Authority and serves the south-eastern segment of the Pittsburgh metropolitan area. The airport serves the general aviation community with no scheduled commercial airline service.

The airport is named for Joseph A. Hardy, founder of 84 Lumber. Previously known as "Connellsville Airport," it was renamed in 2007 to recognize Hardy's support of improving the airport. Hardy, a Fayette County Commissioner at the time of the donation, gave the airport authority $800,000 for runway improvements.

This airport is assigned a three-letter location identifier of VVS by the Federal Aviation Administration, but it does not have an International Air Transport Association (IATA) airport code.

The airport property is home to other Fayette County entities and businesses:

- Fayette County Hazardous Materials (HAZMAT) Response Team.
- Fayette Area Coordinated Transportation (FACT). FACT is the main public bus service line for all of Fayette County with trips throughout the county each day. It occupies approximately 4.5 acres of property at the main entrance to the airport.
- Regional Stat MEDEVAC helicopter/air ambulance service, STAT MedEvac 5, a service of the Center for Emergency Medicine of Western Pennsylvania, Inc. is also located at the airport and rents space, buys fuel, and conducts maintenance on site.
- Connellsville Flying School
- Aero Aviation Training Center, LLC. Established in 2006 to provide flight training services to the public.
- Aviation Network, LLC. Established in 2008 to provide aviation management and maintenance.
- North Central Aviation, LLC. Established in 2003 to provide charter flights.
- The Washington Security Group, Inc. Established in 2004 to provide the training and consulting in specific national security areas.

This airport also serves to provide a convenient stopping place for tourism in the region including those travelling to the following county historic and popular spots:

- Frank Lloyd Wright’s Falling Water, Mill Run, PA 15464
- Frank Lloyd Wright’s Kentuck Knob, Chalk Hill, PA 15421
- Ohiopyle, PA & Ohiopyle State Park
- Fort Necessity National Battlefield
- Nemacolin Woodlands Resort, Farmington, PA 15437

== History ==
=== Military Airbase ===
Originally, the airport was a cooperative project between the City of Connellsville, Fayette County, and the Federal Works Progress Administration (WPA) Program. Although first opened in October 1938, it was heavily used during World War II by the United States Army Air Force Air Technical Service Command as a sub-depot of the Middletown Air Depot near Harrisburg. Original airport construction occurred from 1936 to 1938 under the WPA. California University of Pennsylvania helped conduct pilot training in support of the war effort at the Connellsville Airport starting in late 1939.

The 805th Army Air Forces Specialized Depot, which opened on July 1, 1941, repaired and overhauled aircraft and returned them to active service. With the winding down of the war effort during the summer of 1945, the Air Force closed its facilities at Connellsville on June 1, 1945. The airport remained under Federal Government control from 1941 until July 1947 when the Government returned the airport to the city of Connellsville, stipulating it be used for public purposes. During the war, the Government improved the airport facilities greatly, mainly due to the increased industrialization occurring during the war and the expectation that the war would last for some time.

=== Post War Industry ===
Connellsville Airport also served as the site of a Taylorcraft airplane maintenance facility where Taylorcraft airplanes were built and/or repaired in the late 1940s and 1950s. The current main terminal site is the remnants of the Taylorcraft hangar. Connellsville became the headquarters for the Taylor Aircraft Corporation in 1950.

The United States Marine Corps (USMC) Reserve also had training areas in the airport in the 1950s. A two-story brick building at the center of the airport held the base for the Marine Corps Reserve Training Center, which also utilized other buildings on the airport for various uses including a gymnasium, maintenance buildings, a weapons range, and locker rooms.

=== Jet Age ===
By the 1960s, the Connellsville airport had three paved runways, one of approximately 3,400 feet and the other two at 3,000 feet. Of those three, only two survive today. The middle runway was deactivated in the late 1960s. Today it is used as a taxiway and an area for driver training. Anchor Hocking ‘Glass Corporation’, a former major Fayette County employer, rented significant space in the airport, mostly warehouse type space, in the 1960s.

The Fayette County Airport Authority (FCAA) was established in December 1965 to take ownership and management of the airport. Membership to the authority would be based on a representative sample of the county and be selected on the basis of business competence and proven community leadership. Fayette County Airport Authority in February 1966 worked with Penn Central Airways to provide air taxi service between Somerset, Connellsville, and the Greater Pittsburgh Airports. This agreement also involved AAA of Uniontown and United Airlines at the Greater Pittsburgh Airport who helped to handle reservations.

=== Modern Era ===
The airport reportedly fell into relative disrepair in the 1980s and 1990s due to poor pilot attendance/ usage and lack of operating funds.

Fayette County received additional medical support by the addition of the Stat MedEvac group to the Connellsville Airport in 1994. Stat MedEvac performs year-round emergency helicopter support to medical emergencies (namely "life flight" capability). This entity owned by the Center for Emergency Medicine of Western Pennsylvania in Pittsburgh, operates from the sole dedicated helipad on the airport.

=== Revitalization ===
Airport revitalization efforts in the late 1990s resulted in significant improvements after 2001. In 2001, the Commonwealth of Pennsylvania Department of Education certified and licensed ‘Carnegie Mellon Driver Training & Safety Institute, Inc.’, (CM-DSTI) a non-profit subsidiary of Carnegie Mellon University, PA, to operate a private licensed school. This school, funded under a $7.5 Million congressional appropriation in 1999, provided large truck driver training on the airport property focusing on public transportation safety and security and human performance reliability (stress and fatigue). This included an indoor simulator (valued at approximately $650,000) and hands on training on Taxiway F (old decommissioned runway) This school occupied three buildings at the heart of the Connellsville Airport (formerly buildings occupied by the USMC Reserve Training Center). The school, which had 60 employees and a $12 Million annual budget, operated at the airport location until about 2002.

VVS has received on numerous occasions Federal funding for improvements to the facilities and runways specifically from the Aviation Development Program (Pennsylvania Department of Transportation) after 2001. In 2005, the new terminal opened at a cost in excess of $2,000,000. In 2009, VVS received $1 million from Federal (Rural Community Assistance Partnership grant) and state sources to extend the main runway (runway safe zone project). This extension, using allocation of Federal and state money, allows for larger aircraft to land at Connellsville Airport.

KVVS also received grant money to improve general aviation hangar space in close proximity to the new terminal built in 2005. This money totaling $1 million from a Redevelopment Assistance Capital Program (RACP) grant has to be spent on aviation hangar spaces and requires airport matching funds of approximately $800,000. As of August 2011, no construction date has been set. The county has promised $50,000 annually to support improvements.

Since 2003, the county bus service, Fayette Area Coordinated Transportation (FACT) has occupied 4.5 acres of land immediately inside the main entrance to the airport. This publicly funded bus line services the communities throughout the county. This entity has a 49-year lease that commenced in April 2003 with two automatically renewing twenty-five year periods. Lease of the property occurred for the lump sum payment of $60,000 for the initial term. Also in 2003, the Fayette County Hazardous Materials Response Team became an airport tenant. The purpose built building housing the response team is located adjacent to the main terminal building.

A strategic master plan was also enacted in 2003. This included plans for the main terminal construction as well as extension of the runway which was substantially completed by late Fall in 2009. The extension was completed to appease insurance companies that refused to let larger planes land on the airfield. This extension stands to increase air traffic to and from the Connellsville Airport location in support of larger economic development efforts and tourism.

This revitalization included construction of a new terminal building on the north ramp area at the site of the old Taylor Aircraft hangar from 1951. The hangar was partially disassembled to reveal the steel superstructure, with the new terminal being built into the west side of the old hangar. The remainder of the steel Taylor Aircraft hangar remains as part of a covered parking lot. Completion of the multimillion-dollar terminal project occurred in 2005. Approximately $6 Million was used to upgrade the airport from 2002 to 2007. Other significant grant monies have been used or are tied to current projects, including establishment of new aircraft hangar space to the south of the main terminal area. This requires removal of 1950s-1960s era hangars and warehouse space. This PennDOT Bureau of Aviation rehabilitation project is valued at $710,000 with a portion being funded by the FCAA directly through alternate sources. An approximately $3 million project to extend the main runway safe zone was completed in 2010.

== Facilities and aircraft ==
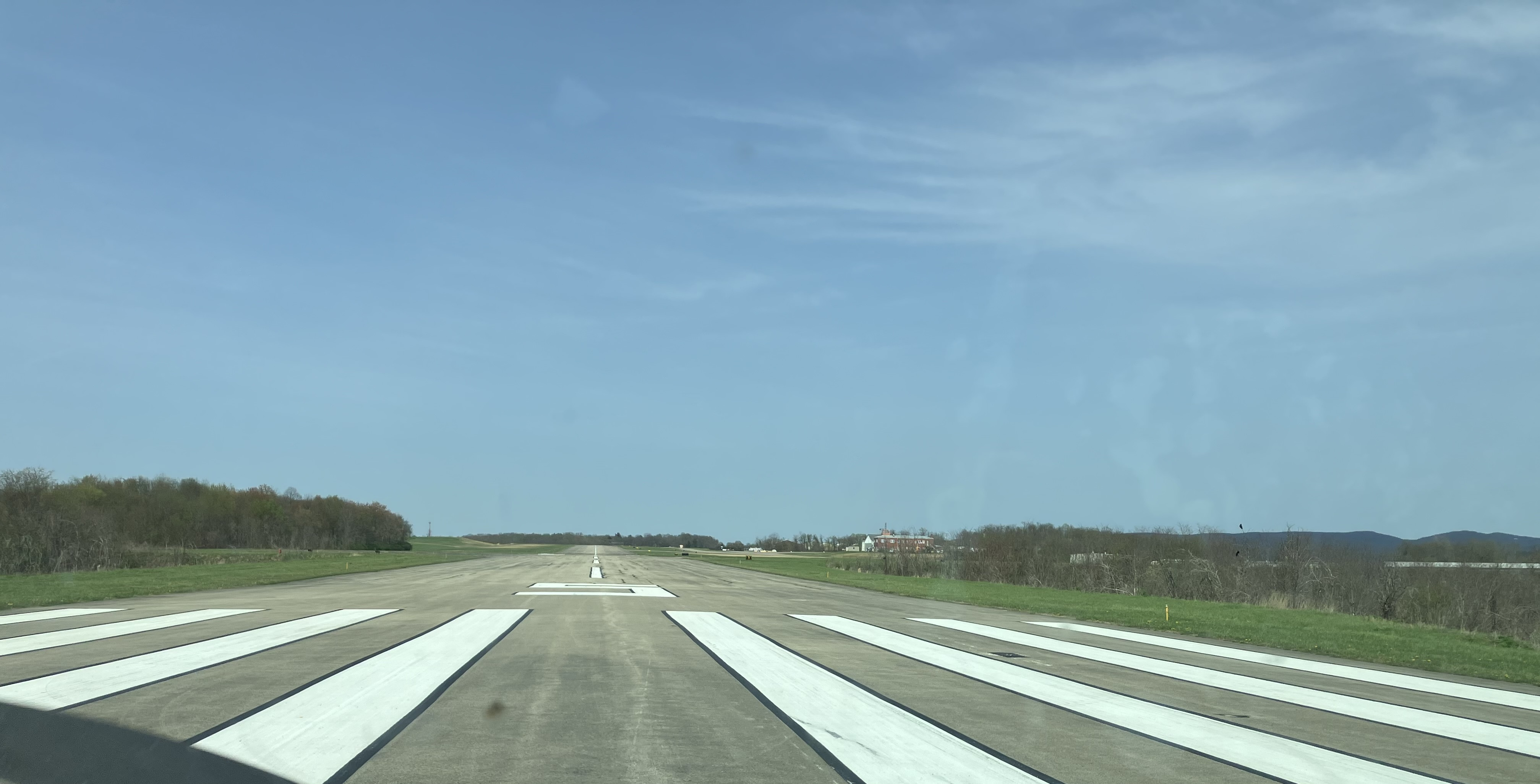
Runway 5

Joseph A. Hardy Connellsville Airport covers an area of 351 acres (142 ha) at an elevation of 1,264 feet (385 m) above mean sea level. It has two asphalt paved runways: 5/23 is 3,833 by 100 feet (1,168 x 30 m) and 14/32 measures 2,404 by 100 feet (733 x 30 m).

For the 12 months ending November 19, 2019, VVS had 30,660 total aircraft operations, an average of 84 per day and consisting of 86% general aviation, <1% military air operations, and 15% air taxi services. During this period 25 aircraft were based there: 23 single-engine, and 2 multi-engine.

VVS, through Fayette County Aviation, and its tenants provide aviation support by way of fuel services (AVGAS and JetA) and aircraft mechanics.

== See also ==
- List of airports in Pennsylvania
- Pennsylvania World War II Army Airfields
