= Cumberland station (Maryland) =

Train station in Maryland, United States

Cumberland, MD
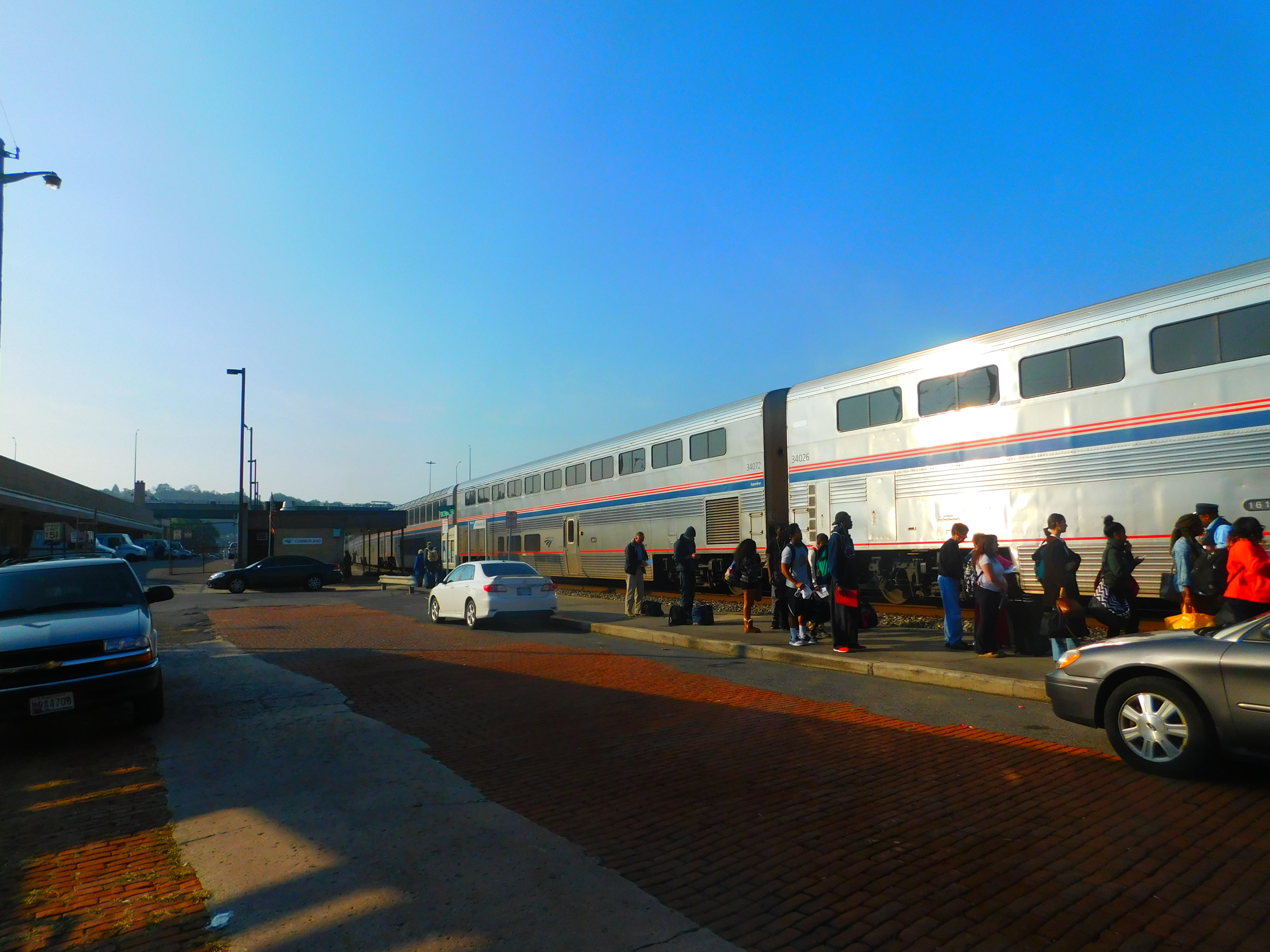
- The Capitol Limited at Cumberland station in October 2015

General information
- Location: 201 East Harrison Street; Cumberland, Maryland; United States
- Coordinates: 39.6506°N 78.7579°W
- Line: Cumberland Terminal Subdivision
- Platforms: 1 side platform
- Tracks: 2
- Connections: Allegany County Transit; BayRunner Shuttle

Other information
- Station code: Amtrak: CUM

Passengers
- FY 2025: 9,404 (Amtrak)

Services
Preceding station	Amtrak	Following station
Connellsville toward Chicago	Floridian	Martinsburg toward Miami
Former services
Preceding station	Amtrak	Following station
Keyser toward Cincinnati (River Road)	Shenandoah	Martinsburg toward Washington, D.C.
Connellsville toward Chicago	Capitol Limited	Martinsburg toward Washington, D.C.
Location

Cumberland station is a Amtrak train station in Cumberland, Maryland, United States. The station has one side platform serving the two tracks of the Cumberland Terminal Subdivision. It is served by the daily Floridian.

== History ==
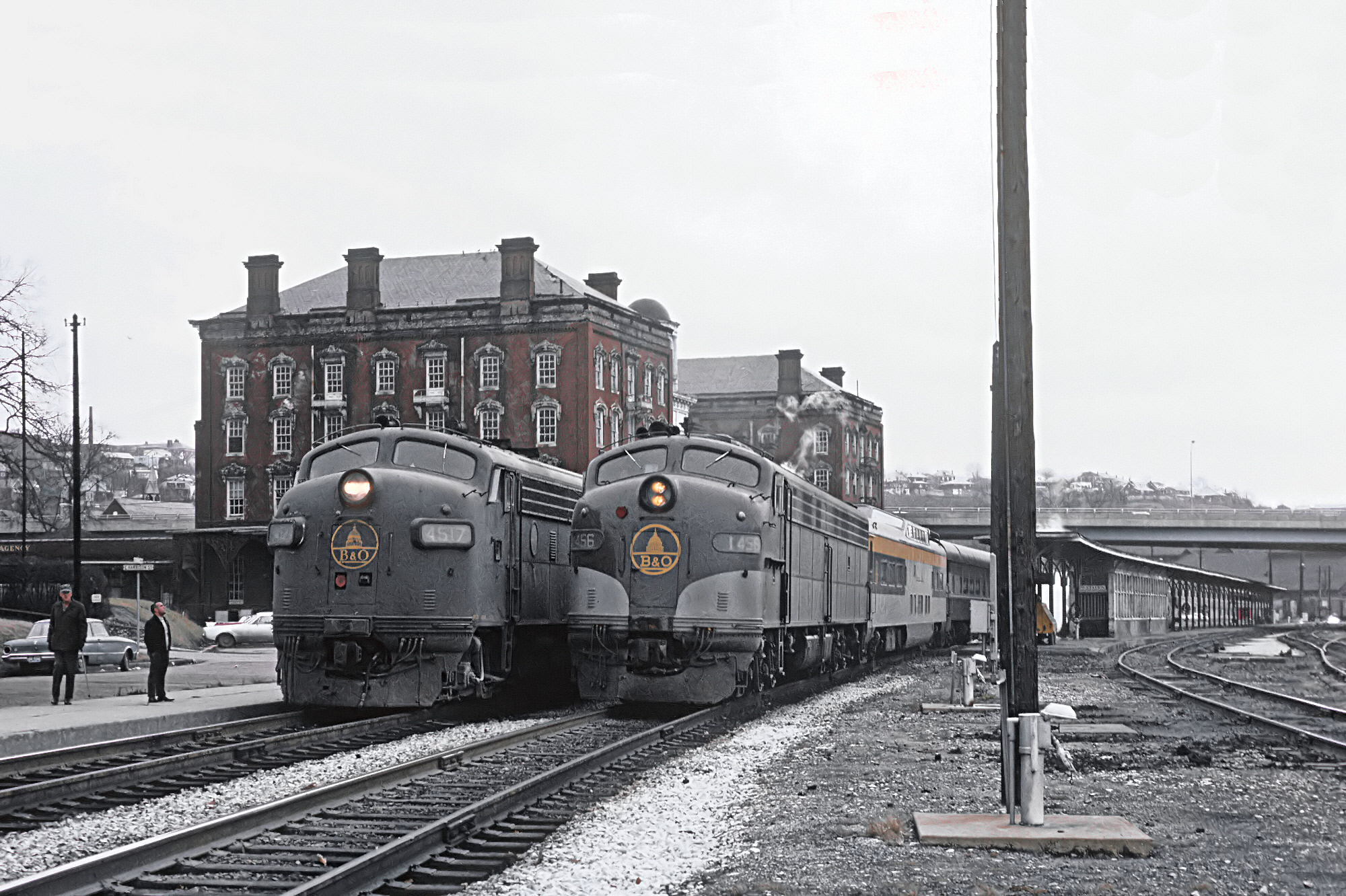
B&O trains at Queen City Station in 1970

The current waiting shelter for Amtrak service in Cumberland sits on the original site of the Queen City Station. This was a 174-room hotel constructed by the Baltimore and Ohio Railroad (B&O) in 1871 with a ballroom, a 400-seat dining room, and gardens and fountains. The station was demolished in 1972, an act which spurred conservation efforts for architecturally and historically significant structures.

Amtrak took over intercity service in May 1971; no service was retained on the B&O mainline. Amtrak restored intercity service on the B&O on September 8, 1971, with the Parkersburg–Washington West Virginian. It was renamed Potomac Turbo on February 7, 1972, and Potomac Special on May 14, 1972.

The Potomac Special was replaced with the Cumberland–Washington Blue Ridge on May 7, 1973. The Cincinnati–Washington Shenandoah was introduced on October 31, 1976; the Blue Ridge was cut back to Martinsburg and later became part of the Brunswick Line. On October 1, 1981, the Shenandoah was replaced with the Chicago–Washington Capitol Limited. On November 10, 2024, the Capitol Limited was merged with the Silver Star as the Floridian.

Improvements were made to the station's sidewalks, entrances, and restrooms in 2019. As of 2025, MARC is considering extending the Brunswick Line to Cumberland station.
