= Pittsburgh Media Market =

The Pittsburgh Media Market is part of the Greater Pittsburgh region. It is primarily a definition of the reach of the Pittsburgh television and radio media as defined by Nielsen in a prime sense. The area is actually smaller than the true area of Pittsburgh media reach, since many counties of east central Ohio and the West Virginia panhandle are served exclusively by some Pittsburgh affiliates though also having a few locally based network signals.

The Pittsburgh Media Market is officially defined as:

Maryland counties:

- Garrett

West Virginia counties:

- Monongalia
- Preston

Pennsylvania counties:

- Allegheny
- Westmoreland
- Fayette
- Beaver
- Armstrong
- Butler
- Washington
- Indiana
- Lawrence
- Greene

And outside the Pittsburgh metropolitan area:

- Clarion
- Venango

== See also ==
- List of United States television markets
