= Connellsville station =

Train station in Pennsylvania, US

Connellsville, PA
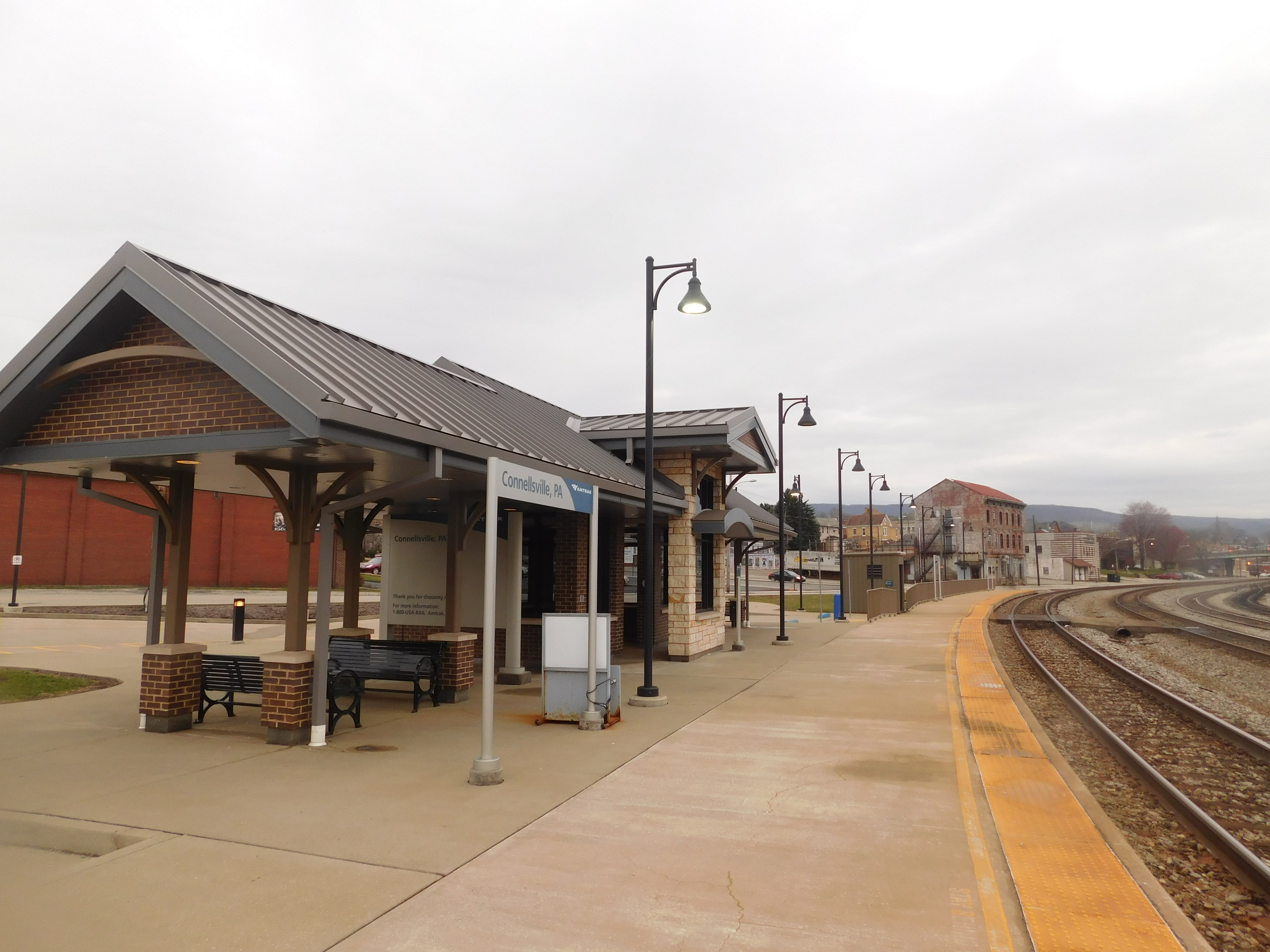
- Connellsville station in March 2016

General information
- Location: North Water Street and West Peach Street; Connellsville, Pennsylvania; United States
- Coordinates: 40.0200°N 79.5927°W
- Platforms: 1 side platform
- Tracks: 4
- Connections: Fayette Area Coordinated Transportation

Construction
- Parking: Yes
- Accessible: Yes

Other information
- Station code: Amtrak: COV

History
- Opened: 2011

Passengers
- FY 2025: 4,023 (Amtrak)

Services
Preceding station	Amtrak	Following station
Pittsburgh toward Chicago	Floridian	Cumberland toward Miami
Former services
Preceding station	Amtrak	Following station
Pittsburgh toward Chicago	Capitol Limited	Cumberland toward Washington, D.C.
Preceding station	Baltimore and Ohio Railroad	Following station
Pittsburgh toward Chicago	Main Line	Cumberland toward Jersey City
West Newton toward Chicago	Main Line	Gibson toward Jersey City
Location

Connellsville station is an Amtrak train station in Connellsville, Pennsylvania, United States. It is served by the daily Floridian.

== History ==
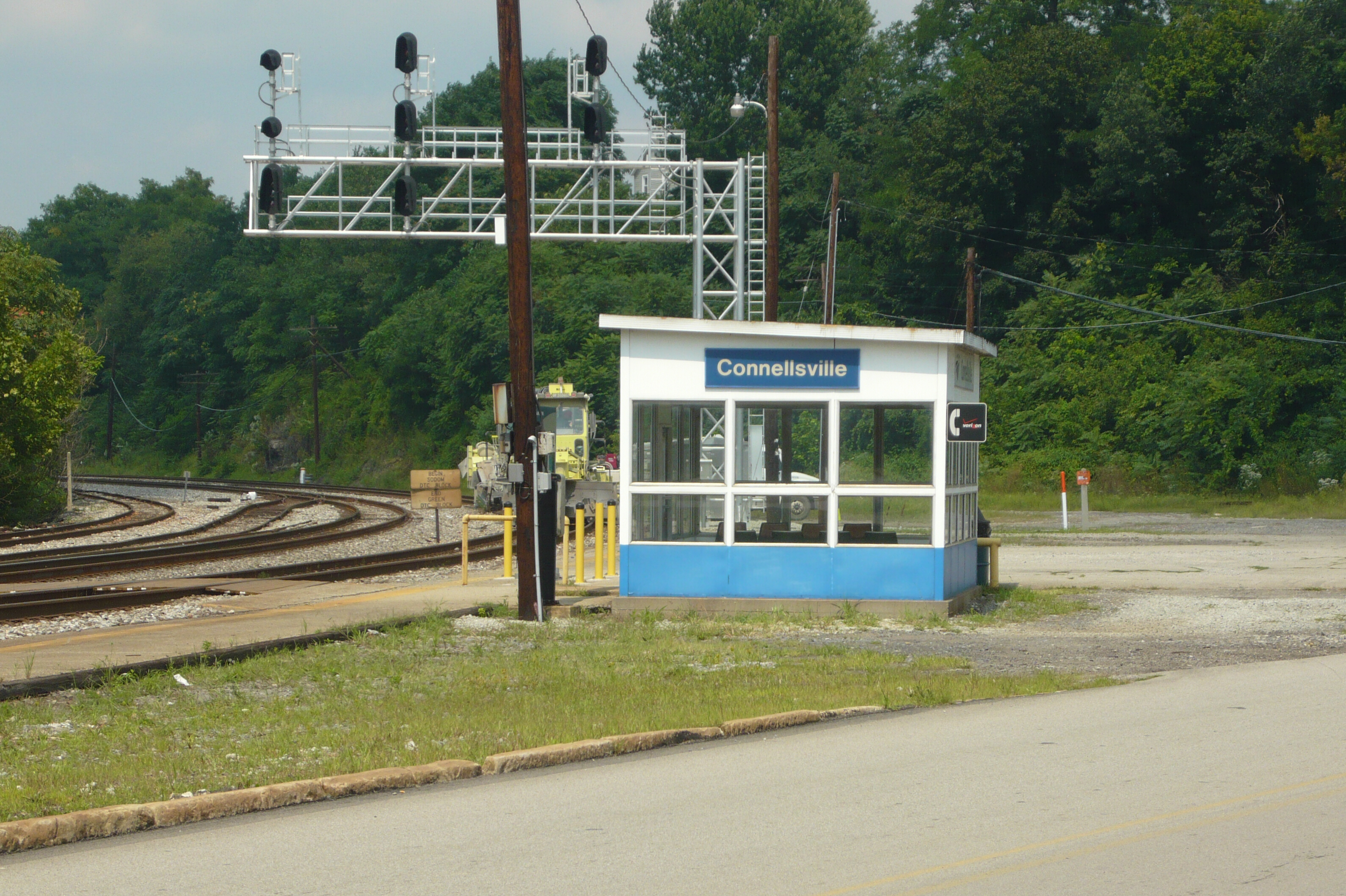
The previous station in 2009

The current station is the third station placed here. It was constructed during the winter of 2010-11 and cost $1.25 million. Built primarily of dark red brick, the structure has an enclosed, one-story waiting room with large windows. From the outside, the waiting room is marked by projecting bays whose surfaces are covered in a rock-faced, coursed ashlar in a light beige tone. Developed by d+A design+Architecture of Yardley, Pennsylvania, the station design draws inspiration from historic late 19th and early 20th century depots found in small towns across the nation. It is similar to stations Amtrak has built in Okeechobee, Florida; Winnemucca, Nevada; and Alliance, Ohio. In addition to the shelter, Amtrak installed a 550-foot (170 m) concrete side platform, signage and light poles. The new station is in the vicinity of the former Baltimore & Ohio Railroad station, which no longer stands.

On November 10, 2024, the Capitol Limited was merged with the Silver Star as the Floridian.
