= Latrobe station =

Train station in Latrobe, Pennsylvania

Latrobe, PA
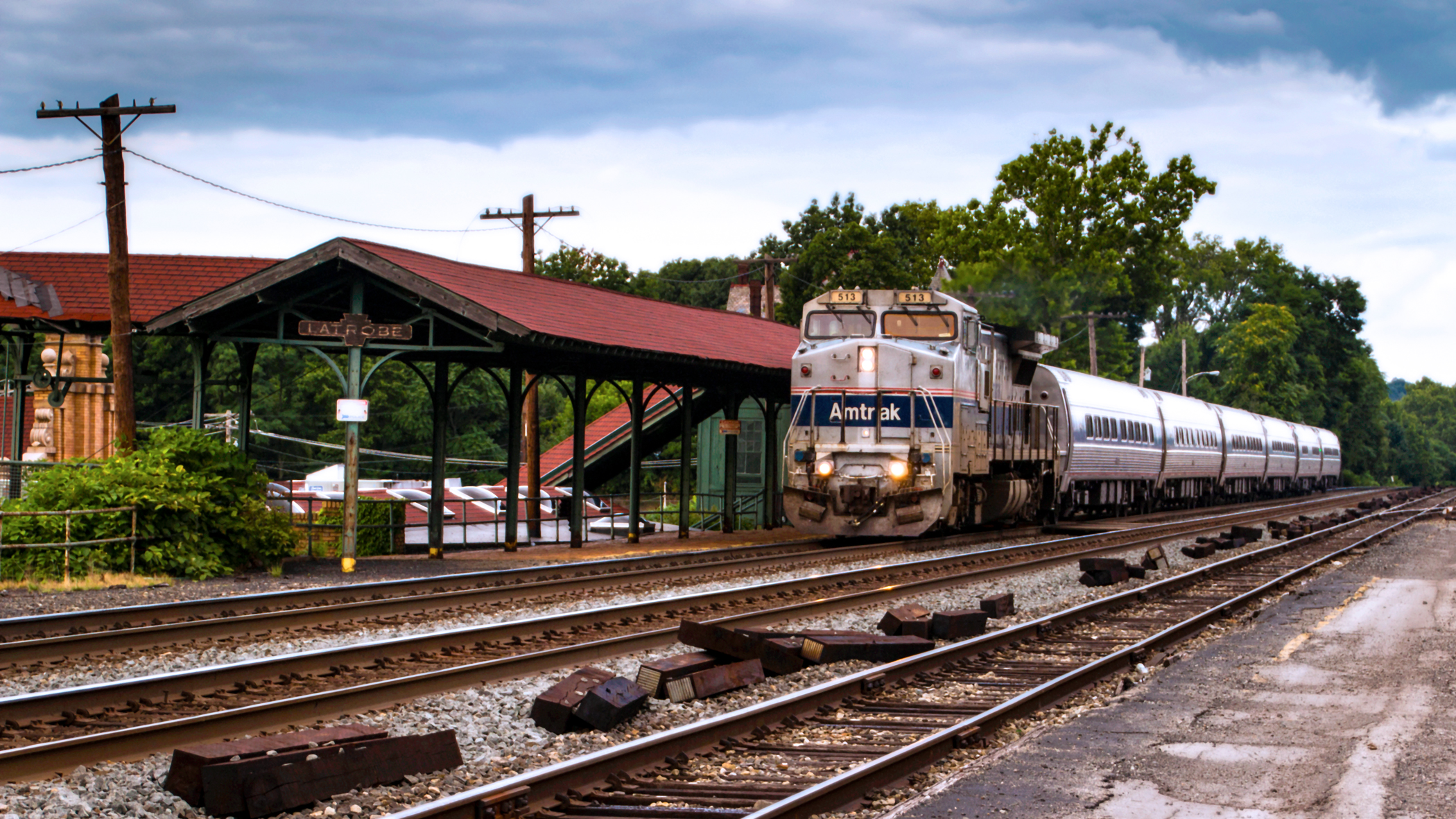
- The Pennsylvanian arrives at Latrobe in 2014

General information
- Location: 329 McKinley Avenue; Latrobe, Pennsylvania; United States
- Coordinates: 40°19′6″N 79°23′7″W
- Owner: Amtrak
- Line: NS Pittsburgh Line (Keystone Corridor)
- Platforms: 2 side platforms
- Tracks: 3
- Connections: Westmoreland County Transit Authority: 9

Construction
- Parking: Yes
- Accessible: No, under construction

Other information
- Station code: Amtrak: LAB

History
- Opened: c. 1850s
- Rebuilt: 1903

Passengers
- FY 2025: 3,420 (Amtrak)

Services
| Preceding station | Amtrak | Following station |
|---|---|---|
| Greensburg toward Pittsburgh | Pennsylvanian | Johnstown toward New York |
Former services
| Preceding station | Amtrak | Following station |
|---|---|---|
| Greensburg toward Chicago | Three Rivers 1995–2005 | Johnstown toward New York |
| Greensburg toward Pittsburgh | Fort Pitt 1981–1983 | Johnstown toward Altoona |
| Greensburg toward Kansas City | National Limited 1971–1979 | Johnstown toward New York or Washington, D.C. |
| Preceding station | Pennsylvania Railroad | Following station |
| Beatty toward Chicago | Main Line | Loyalhanna toward New York or Exchange Place |
- Pennsylvania Railroad Station—Latrobe
- U.S. National Register of Historic Places
- Built: 1903
- Architect: William H. Brown
- Architectural style: Late Victorian
- NRHP reference No.: 86001689
- Added to NRHP: July 17, 1986
Location

Latrobe station is an Amtrak intercity rail station located in Latrobe, Pennsylvania. The station served by the two daily round trips of the Pennsylvanian.

The historic station building remains but is used as a restaurant. Passenger facilities consist of a small shelter with bench seating. Latrobe station operates as a flag stop, where trains stop only on request, due to low ridership.

== History ==
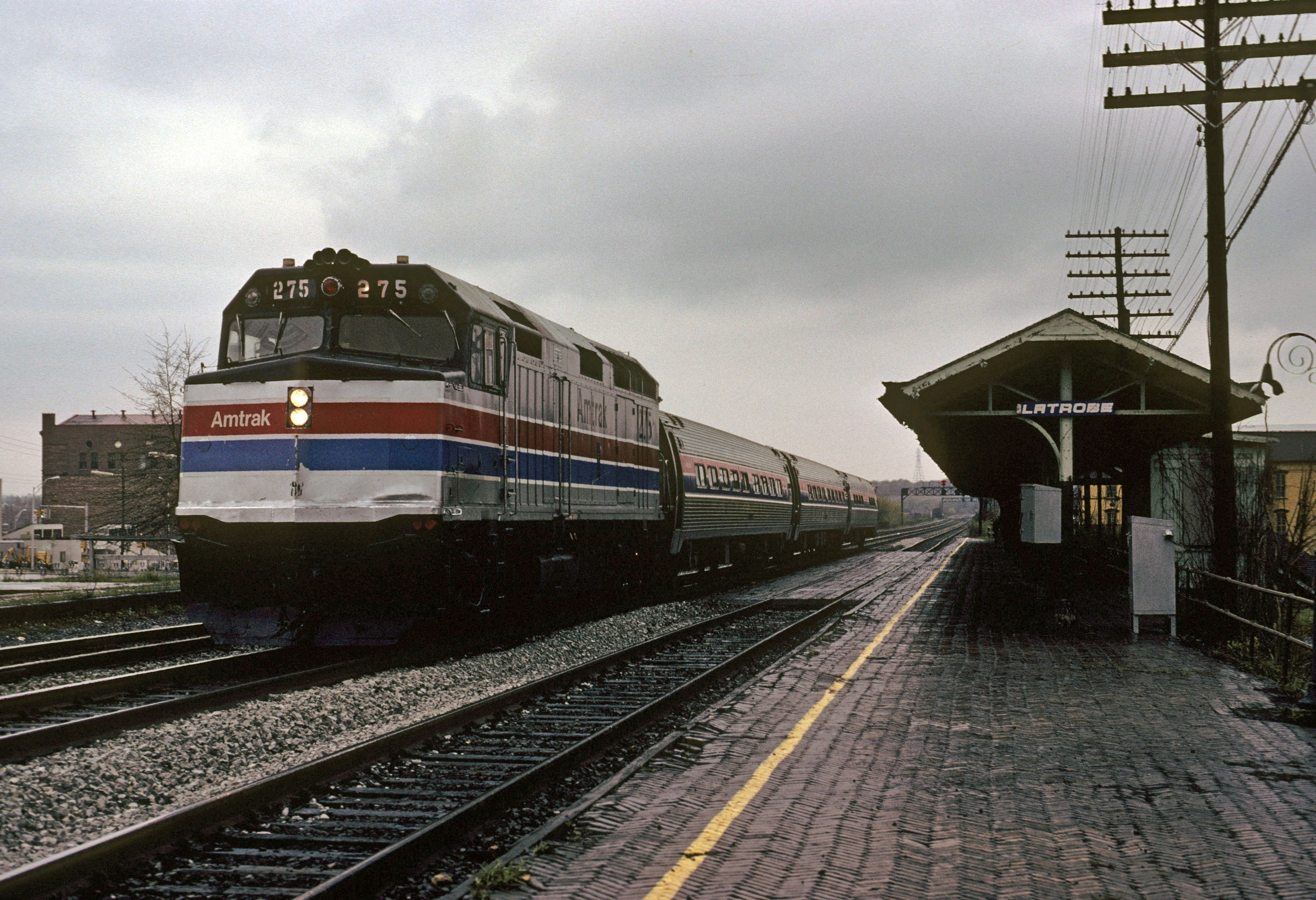
The first Pennsylvanian at Latrobe in 1980

The station was opened in 1903 by the Pennsylvania Railroad as part of a project to elevate the right-of-way as it passed through Latrobe. The architect, William H. Brown, used an eclectic Late Victorian style. It is a one-story, brick building, eight bays wide and five bays deep. It has a flat roof with parapet and a central cross gable. The gable end over the main entrance has a pediment with stone panels and terra cotta decoration. The station was listed on the National Register of Historic Places in 1986.

Until 2005, Latrobe was served by a second daily train, the Three Rivers (which had replaced the Broadway Limited in 1995), an extended version of the Pennsylvanian that terminated in Chicago. Upon its cancellation, the sole Pennsylvanian marked the first time in Latrobe's railway history that the town was served by just a single daily passenger train.

In April 2023, Amtrak announced plans to upgrade the station to make it accessible in accordance with the Americans with Disabilities Act of 1990. By December 2023, the $1.7 million project was awaiting approval due to the historic nature of the station. As of November 2026, construction is under way and expected to be completed in late 2027.
