= Queen City Hotel =

- Formerly listed on the U.S. National Register of Historic Places
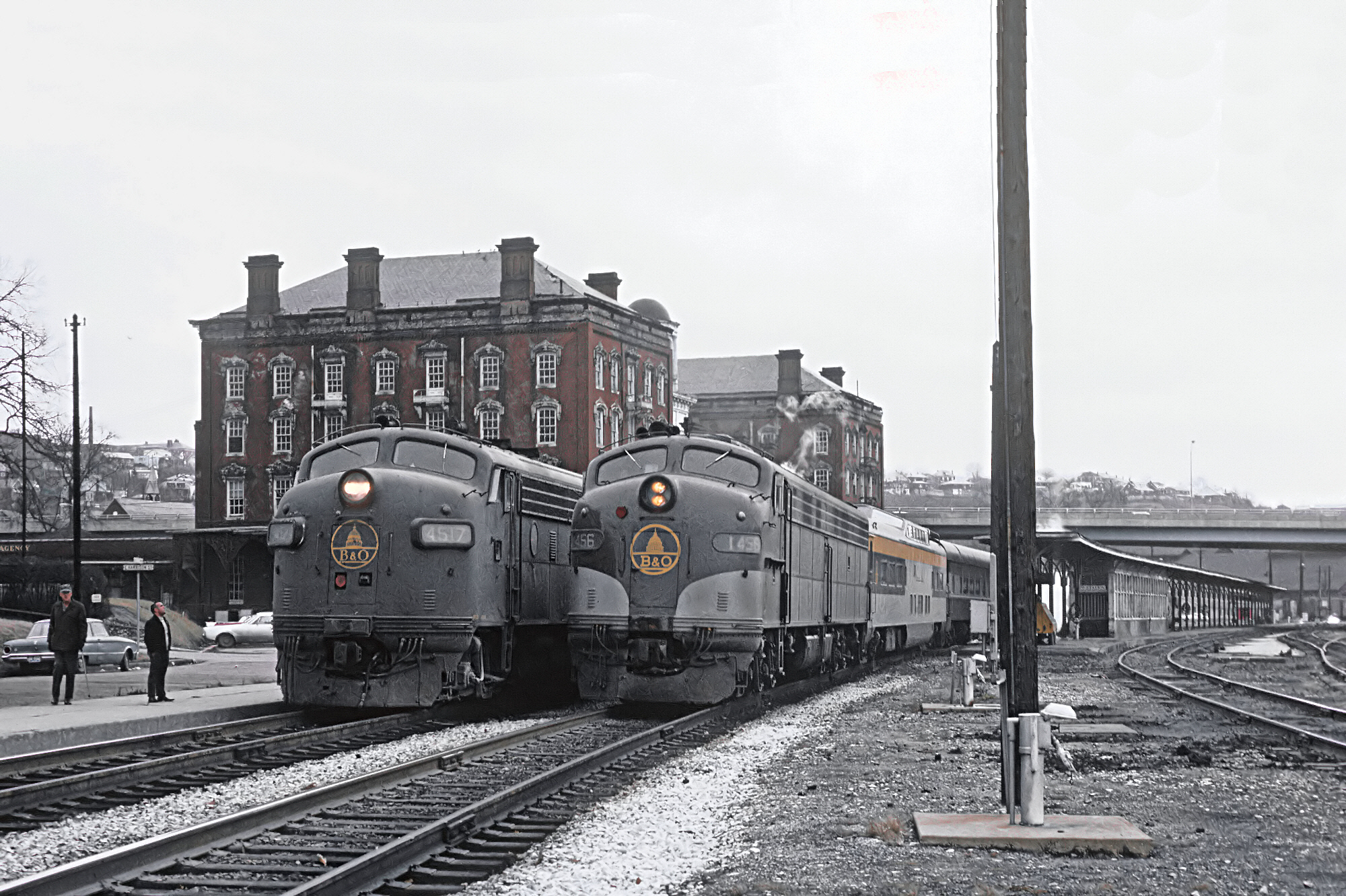
- The B&O's Metropolitan (left) and The Shenandoah at Cumberland, MD on December 5, 1970.
- Coordinates: 39°39′01″N 78°45′27″W
- Area: 16 acres (6.5 ha)
- NRHP reference No.: 71001052

Significant dates
- Added to NRHP: March 12, 1971
- Removed from NRHP: January 1, 1999

The Queen City Hotel was constructed in 1871 by the Baltimore and Ohio Railroad (B&O) in Cumberland, Maryland to serve both as a train station and as a destination. Hosting 174 rooms, it also had such features as formal gardens with a fountain, a ballroom and 400-seat dining room. It was torn down in 1972 to make room for a new main United States Post Office and Distribution facility with a much smaller station for Amtrak service between the new Post Office and the railroad tracks.

== History and design ==
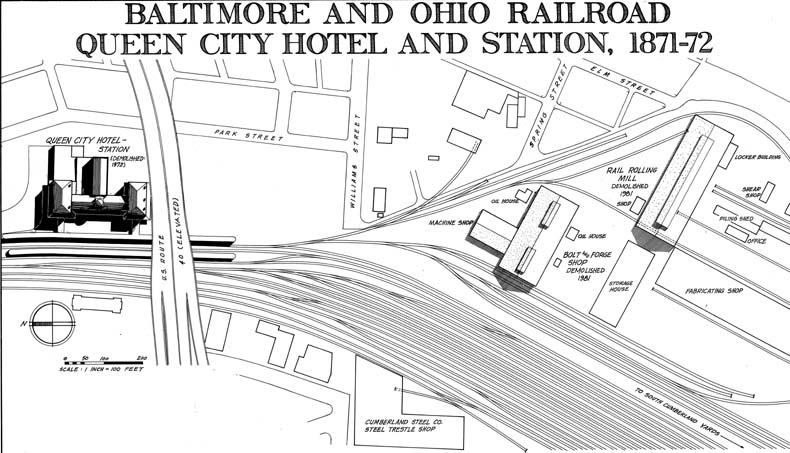
The Queen City Hotel was located on Park and E. Harrison Street.

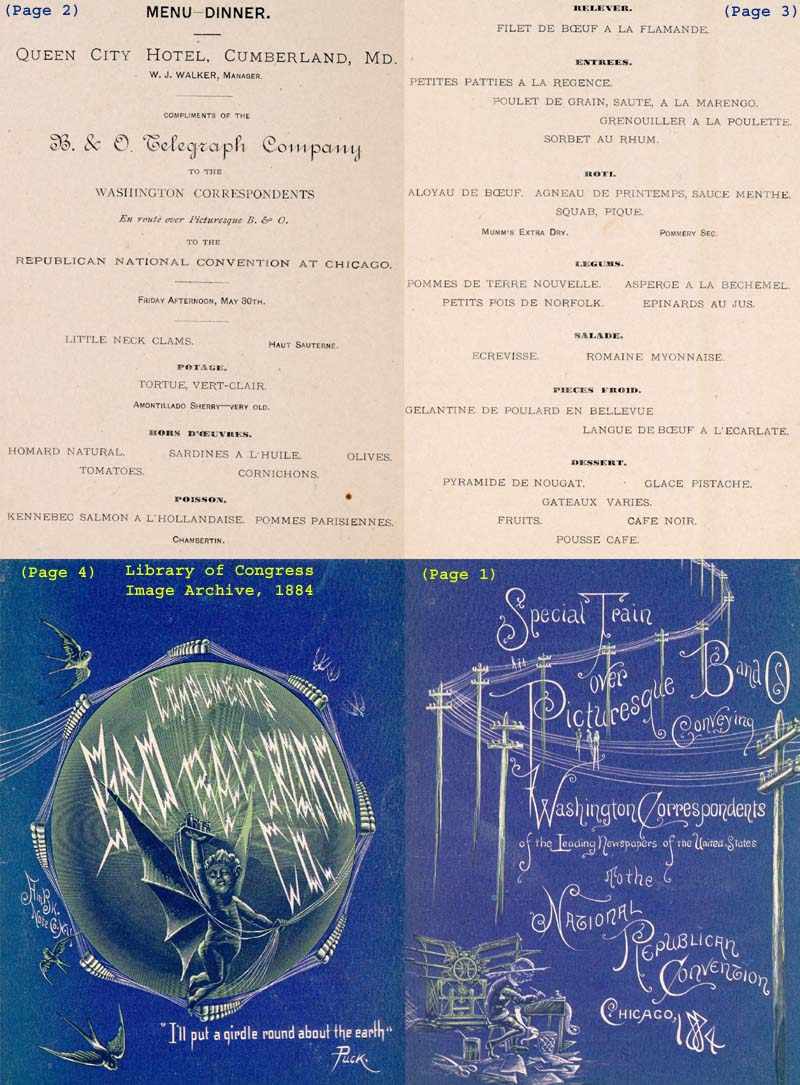
Restaurant menu, circa 1884

The hotel was built only a year after the B&O completed its rail connection to Pittsburgh. This placed Cumberland at a major junction of the route northwest to Pittsburgh and the B&O main line west of the Ohio River. The building was designed by Thomas N. Heskett of the B&O Road Department in the Italianate style, and the construction cost was over $350,000. The hotel served as a summer resort, although the railroad did not actively promote it as a tourist destination. Located in a valley surrounded by mountains, it provided an escape from the summer heat.

The year the hotel was finished, the B&O expanded its resort business by constructing the Deer Park Hotel in Garrett County, Maryland. (The latter hotel closed in 1929 and was later destroyed by fire.)

The B&O completed construction of a new, expanded passenger station component in 1912. The station occupied three floors and included offices for the railroad company.

== Decline and attempt at preservation ==
As with other railroads, passenger traffic on the B&O line declined in the mid-20th century. Interest in and occupancy of the hotel also declined. The hotel closed to the public in December 1964. Following a fire in 1969, the building was inspected by the city and declared to be a hazard. The B&O made plans to demolish the hotel, and supporters of historic preservation attempted court action to save the building. These efforts were unsuccessful and the B&O began demolition of the building in 1971.

The effort to preserve this ornate, Victorian-era structure was one of the classic preservation battles of the early 1970s. It was one of the last remaining railroad hotels in the U.S. The battle was lost when the building was demolished.

The hotel site is now occupied by the Cumberland Post Office.

== Images ==
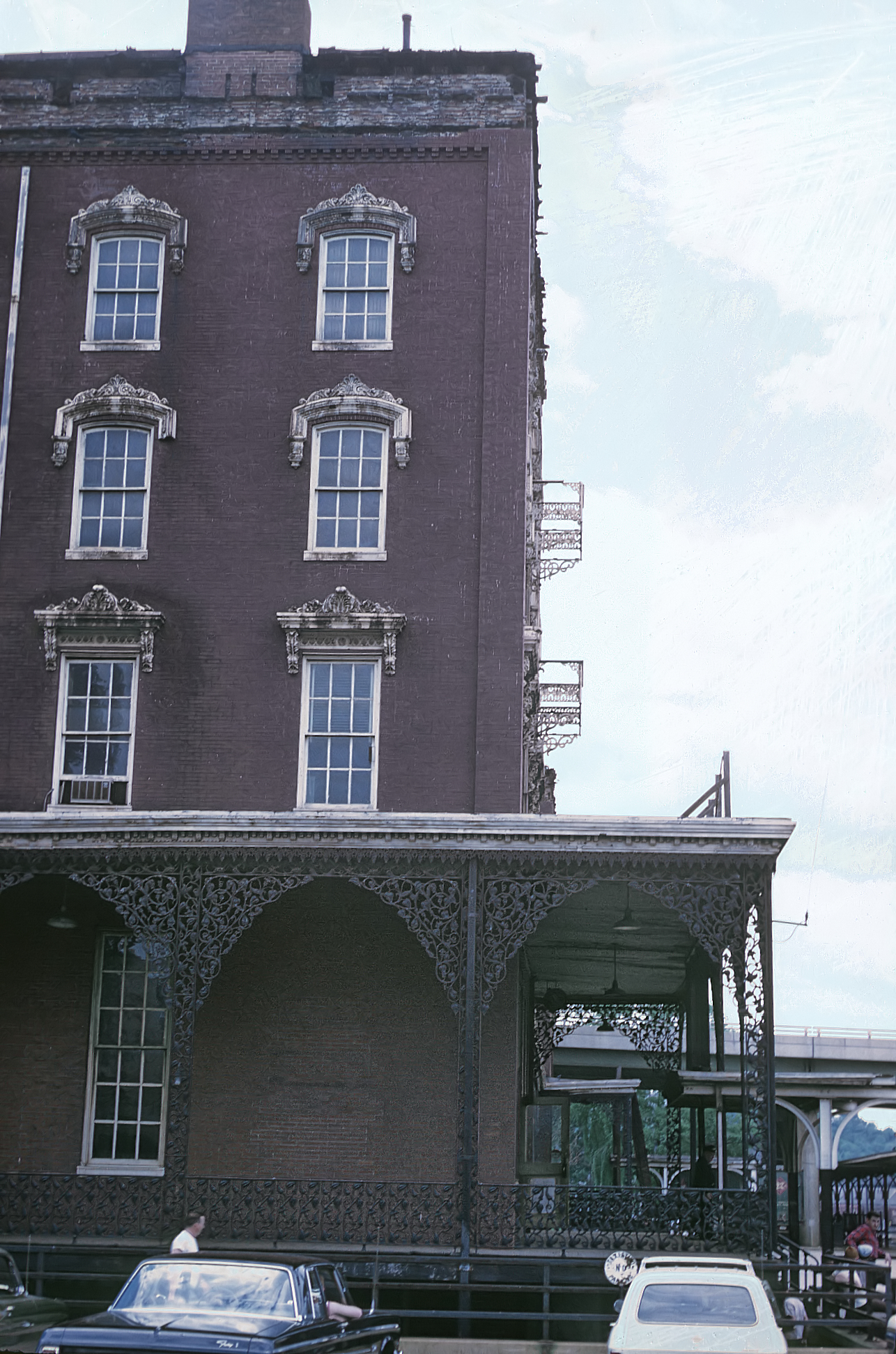

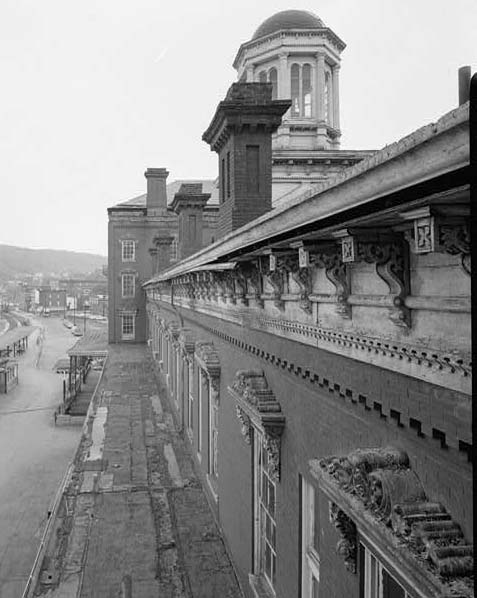

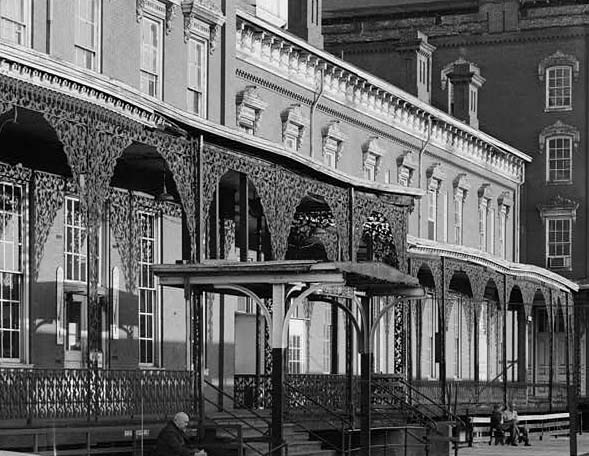

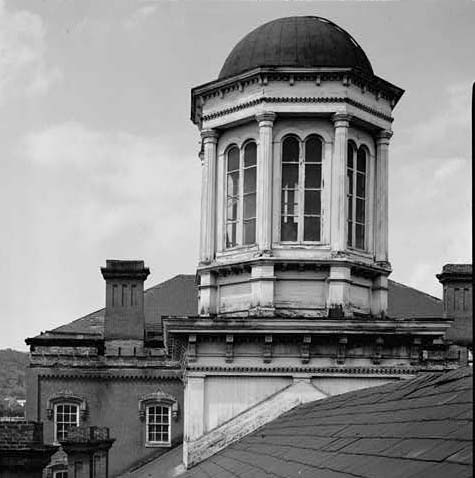

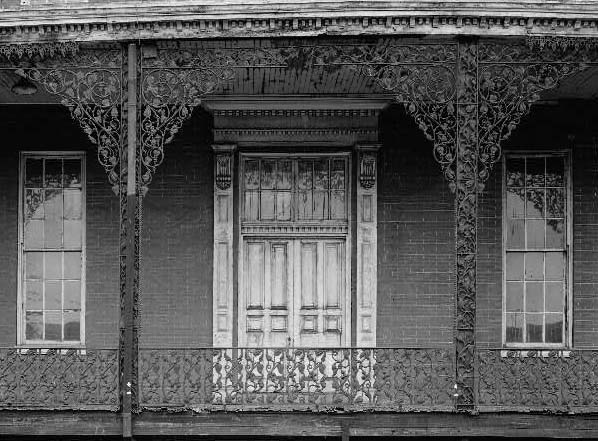

== See also ==
- Cumberland station (Western Maryland Railway) (extant)
- Cumberland station (Maryland), the current Amtrak station

| Preceding station | Baltimore and Ohio Railroad | Following station |
|---|---|---|
| Connellsville toward Chicago | Main Line | Martinsburg toward Jersey City |
| Mount Savage Junction toward Chicago | Main Line | North Branch toward Jersey City |
| Amcelle toward St. Louis | St. Louis Line | Terminus |
