= University of Pittsburgh Transportation System =

Shuttle bus for University of Pittsburgh students

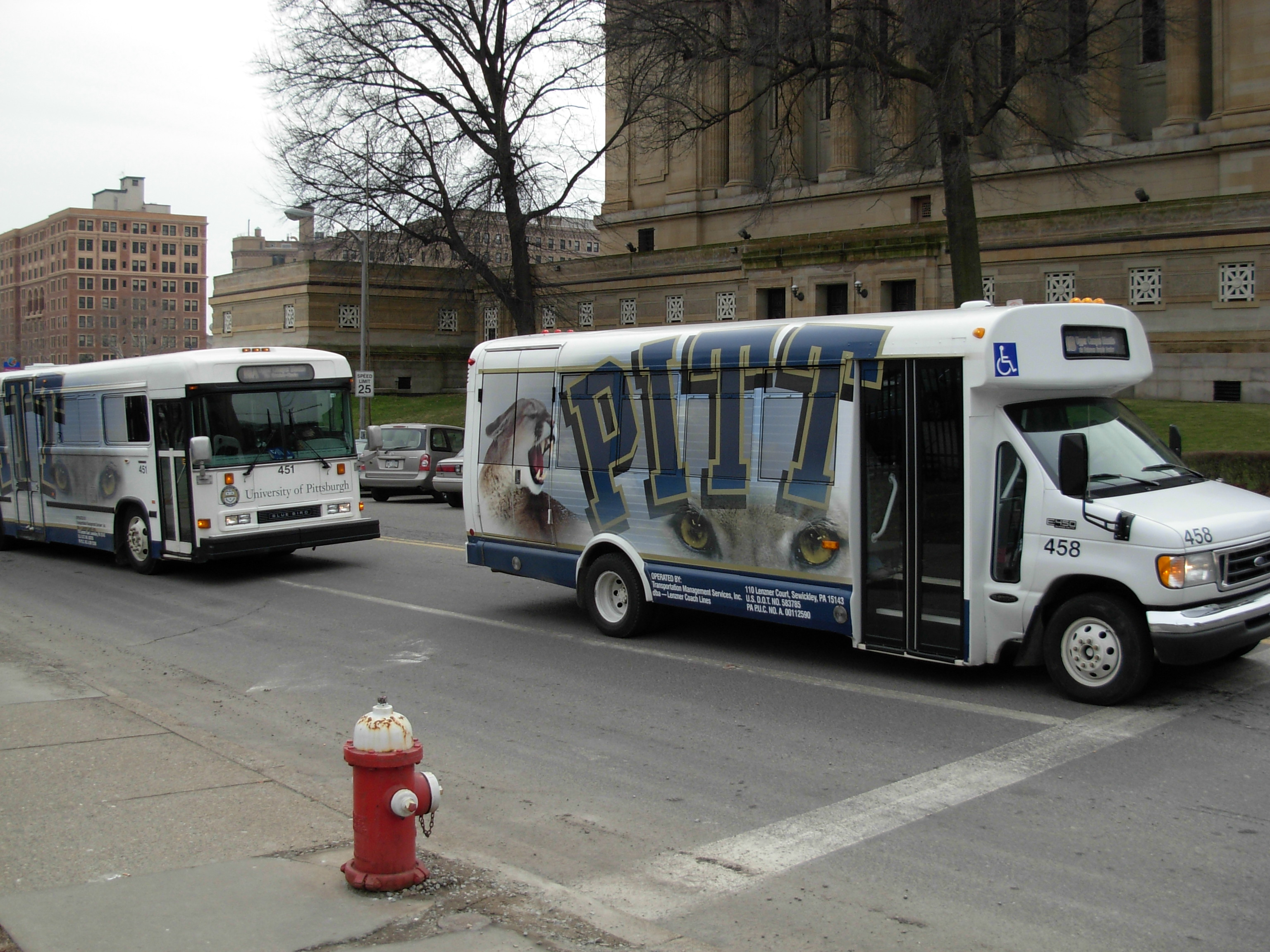
- Service area: Pittsburgh
- Service type: Shuttle Bus
- Routes: 12
- Website: Pitt Shuttle Schedule

The University of Pittsburgh Transportation System is a series of student shuttles serving the Oakland neighborhood of Pittsburgh, the city's intellectual heart. Although operated by the University of Pittsburgh, students from Carnegie Mellon and Chatham University may also ride the buses for free. While many Port Authority of Allegheny County bus routes pass through or terminate in Oakland, many of these lines only travel down main streets and do not provide efficient access between the universities and student housing. The university uses a numbering scheme similar to that of the Port Authority.

== Routes ==
The routes for the fall and spring semester are listed below:

- 10A Upper Campus via Centre/Craig (daily service)
- 10B Upper Campus via Petersen Events Center (weekdays)
- 15A OC Lot (weekdays)
- 20A North Oakland via Centre Ave (daily service)
- 20B North Oakland via Morewood/Centre (weekdays)
- 25A Library Resource Facility (weekdays)
- 30A South Oakland via Meyran/Dawson (weekdays)
- 30B South Oakland via Dawson/McKee (weekdays)
- 30C South Oakland via Kennett Square/Dawson (late nights)
- 40A Biotech Center via Bates/Kennett Square (weekdays)
- RIB (Residence Inn Bigelow) Express (weekdays)
- BSP (Bridgeside Point) II (weekdays)
