= Town & Country Transit =

Pennsylvania transportation agency

- Service type: Bus
- Routes: 3
- Fuel type: Diesel
- Website: tandctransit.com

Town & Country Transit, officially registered as Mid-County Transit Authority, is the operator of mass transportation in Armstrong County, Pennsylvania. Three local routes are provided in the Kittanning and Ford City areas. The agency does not serve the edges of suburban Pittsburgh that are contained in the southern fringes of the county.

== Routes ==
- 1 Ford City-Valley View-Manorville
- 2 Mall/Hospital
- 3 Lemon Way
