= Greensburg =

Greensburg may refer to:

== Places in the United States ==
- Greensburg, Indiana
- Greensburg, Kansas
- Greensburg, Kentucky
- Greensburg, Louisiana
- Greensburg, Missouri
- Greensburg, Ohio
- Greensburg Township, Putnam County, Ohio
- Greensburg, Pennsylvania
- Greensburg, West Virginia

== Other ==
- "Greensburg", a track on Fetchin Bones' second album, Bad Pumpkin
- 2007 Greensburg tornado, an EF5 tornado that hit Greensburg, Kansas, commonly known as the "Greensburg tornado" or just "Greensburg"
- Greensburg (TV series) (2008-2010), about the rebuilding of Greensburg (Kansas) after being struck by the 2007 Greensburg tornado
