= Stavich Bike Trail =

Rail trail in the United States

- Length: 9.9 mi (15.9 km)
- Location: Mahoning County, Ohio and Lawrence County, Pennsylvania, USA
- Trailheads: Lowellville, Ohio to New Castle, Pennsylvania
- Use: bicycles, walking
- Highest point: 919 ft
- Lowest point: 801 ft
- Difficulty: easy
- Season: year-round
- Hazards: traffic (crossings), some parts of the trail are shared with vehicles to allow access to houses
Trail map

The Stavich Bike Trail is a National Recreation Trail located in Mahoning County, Ohio and Lawrence County, Pennsylvania. The rail trail is 9.9 miles long and goes from Lowellville to Union Township in Lawrence County, traveling directly through Lowellville. It was constructed on the former Penn-Ohio Electric System trolley line along the Mahoning River in 1983, adjacent to the CSX New Castle Subdivision tracks. Considered an early example of rail-trails, its 1983 construction was dependent on a donation from the Stavich family, who ran many aluminum mills in the Youngstown area.

== History ==
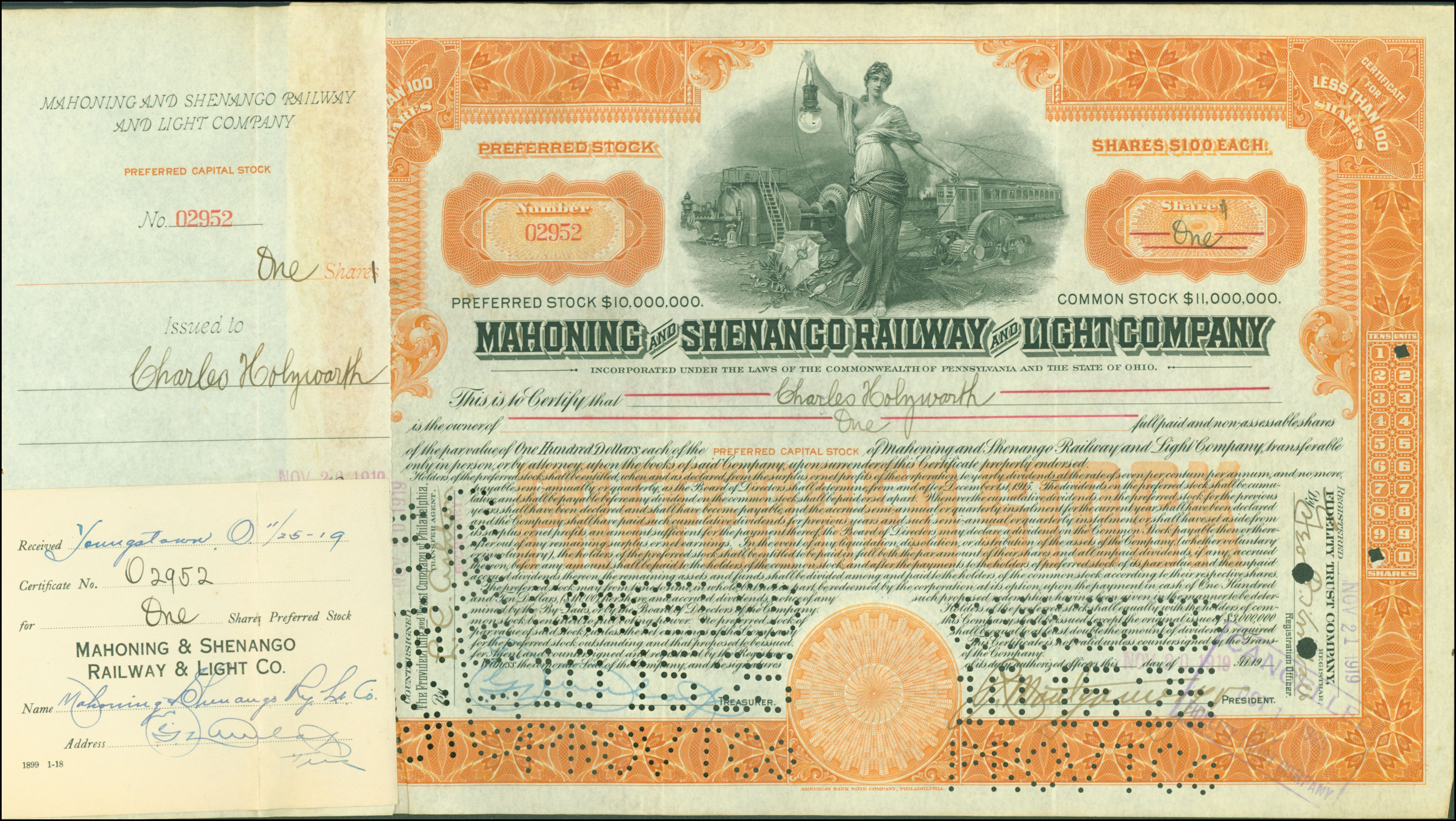
Share of the Mahoning & Shenango Railway and Light Company, issued 20. November 1919

From the late 19th century through the 1940s, it was very common to find streetcars and trolleys throughout much of Western Pennsylvania and Eastern Ohio. Originally, many of these streetcar lines were built by numerous companies, but merged into the Mahoning & Shenango Railway and Light System in 1905. The company changed its name to the Penn-Ohio Electric System in 1920. The company provided service through much of the area known as the Mahoning Valley, having both local streetcar lines and interurban trolleys. The main line, between New Castle and Youngstown, opened in 1902. Part of that line is now the Stavich Bike Trail.

The Penn-Ohio trolley system began its downfall once the rise of the automobile began, as well as the Great Depression. Ridership reportedly fell by 45% between 1930 and 1931. This caused the main line to be converted to buses between 1931 and 1932, the first in the Penn-Ohio system to do so. Subsequently, numerous other interurban trolleys and local streetcars in the Mahoning Valley were converted to buses. The last of which to be converted were the local streetcars in New Castle, which were converted to buses in 1941, forming the Shenango Valley Transportation Company.

== Bicycle trail ==
In 1983, thanks to a donation from the Stavich family, who were a local aluminum tycoon, construction commenced on the nearly 10-mile long trail between the two cities. It opened later that year. Since then, numerous emergency repairs have had to be completed on the trail after intense Spring storms wash parts of the trail away.

Additionally, the Lawrence County Department of Planning & Community Development has proposed new trails connecting to Stavich Bike Trail in its 2017 Greenways Plan. One of which includes improving the trail connection from the Stavich Bike Trail to Downtown New Castle. The department's ideal option is to create a separate trail option into the city along Penn Power's right-of-way. It also plans for improvements at the crossing at Covert Road, which was identified as the most dangerous along the trail. Another proposed route continues the trail along the CSX railroad tracks info Mahoningtown, although this is a lower priority to the downtown connection.
