= Fayette Area Coordinated Transportation =

Public transport service in Pennsylvania, United States

- Parent: Fayette County Board of Commissioners
- Founded: 1996
- Headquarters: 825 Airport Road; Lemont Furnace, Pennsylvania
- Service area: Fayette County, Pennsylvania
- Service type: Bus
- Routes: 10
- Hubs: 2
- Stations: 1
- Fuel type: Diesel
- Chief executive: Rudy Dutko
- Website: www.factbus.com

Fayette Area Coordinated Transportation, known by the moniker of FACT, is a public transportation service located in Fayette County, Pennsylvania. It provides inter-city bus and paratransit service to select communities within the county. Because the region is located within the metropolitan (but not the urban) area of Pittsburgh, four times per day service is provided to the Downtown Pittsburgh area. In 2009, the Connellsville-Uniontown Route was extended into Westmoreland County to the Countryside Plaza Shopping Center, near Mount Pleasant.

== Hubs and Stations ==
There are two Hubs in the county, each with a park and ride lot, and a Bus Station to handle "after-hours" traffic that comes with a bench and minimal shelter from the elements.

=== Transit Center ===
The FACT Transit Center, located at the Connellsville Airport Complex in Dunbar Township, was completed in 2005. There is a Waiting Area, Comfort Station, Vending Machines, and the Admiministrative Offices, as well as the Bus Garages. There is a 40-vehicle park and ride located here, where the Pittsburgh Commuter and Connellsvlle-Uniontown Routes are accessible to the rider in a safe and secure environment.

=== Transfer Center ===
In 2010, the Transfer Center opened in the Fayette County Business Park in South Union Township. The 1,072 square feet (99.6 m^{2}) facility is open Monday - Friday and all Public Buses stop at the center at regular intervals. The center is also equipped with Vending Machines, Comfort Station, Waiting Area, and a Ticket/Token Office. One can also receive real-time bus information. There is also a Park-and-Ride lot there with a capacity of 40 vehicles in a safe and secure environment.

=== Uniontown Hub ===
The Uniontown Hub is located at Church and Beeson Streets in Uniontown. There is only a bench and minimal shelter here. Public-Transit Buses stop here when the Transfer Center is closed on nights and weekends.

== Route list ==
FACT provides evening and weekend service, and commuter trips on weekdays to downtown Pittsburgh. Shown on this schedule are all municipalities that feature FACT stops, with the served villages within these jurisdictions in parentheses.

Name	Route	Areas Served	Service days
Pittsburgh Commuter	Uniontown Transit Center to Downtown Pittsburgh	Uniontown, North Union Twp (Oliver, Route 51 Park & Ride), Perry Twp (Star Junction), Perryopolis, Rostraver Airport Park & Ride, Century III Mall, Downtown Pittsburgh	Mon - Fri
Brownsville-Republic-Uniontown	Brownsville to Uniontown Transit Center, with some connections to California University of Pennsylvania	Brownsville, Luzerne Twp (Hiller), Redstone Twp (Republic, Allison, Fairbank, Cardale), Menallen Twp (New Salem, Buffington), South Union Twp shopping centers, Uniontown	Mon - Sat
Brownsville Express	Brownsville to Uniontown Transit Center	California University Park & Ride, Brownsville, Menallen Twp (Searights), South Union Twp shopping centers, Uniontown	Mon - Fri
Connellsville-Uniontown	Connellsville to Uniontown Transit Center, with some weekday connections to Mount Pleasant	East Huntington Twp shopping centers, Connellsville, South Connellsville, Dunbar Twp shopping centers, Dunbar, Penn State Fayette Campus, Uniontown	Mon - Sat
Hopwood-Nemacolin	Nemacolin Woodlands to Uniontown Transit Center	Nemacolin Woodlands Resort, Wharton Twp (Chalk Hill), North Union Twp (Hopwood), Uniontown	Mon - Sun
Fairchance-Smithfield	Smithfield to Uniontown Transit Center	Smithfield, Fairchance, South Union Twp (Oliphant Furnace), Uniontown	Mon - Fri
Masontown	Masontown to Uniontown Transit Center	Masontown, German Twp (McClellandtown), South Union Twp shopping centers, Uniontown	Mon - Fri
Uniontown A	City Loop	Uniontown, North Union Twp (East Uniontown), South Union Twp (Hatfield), South Union Twp shopping centers	Mon - Sun
Shuttle	Business/Medical Area Loop	Uniontown Hospital, South Union Twp shopping centers	Mon - Fri
