= Rostraver Airport =

Airport in Pennsylvania, United States

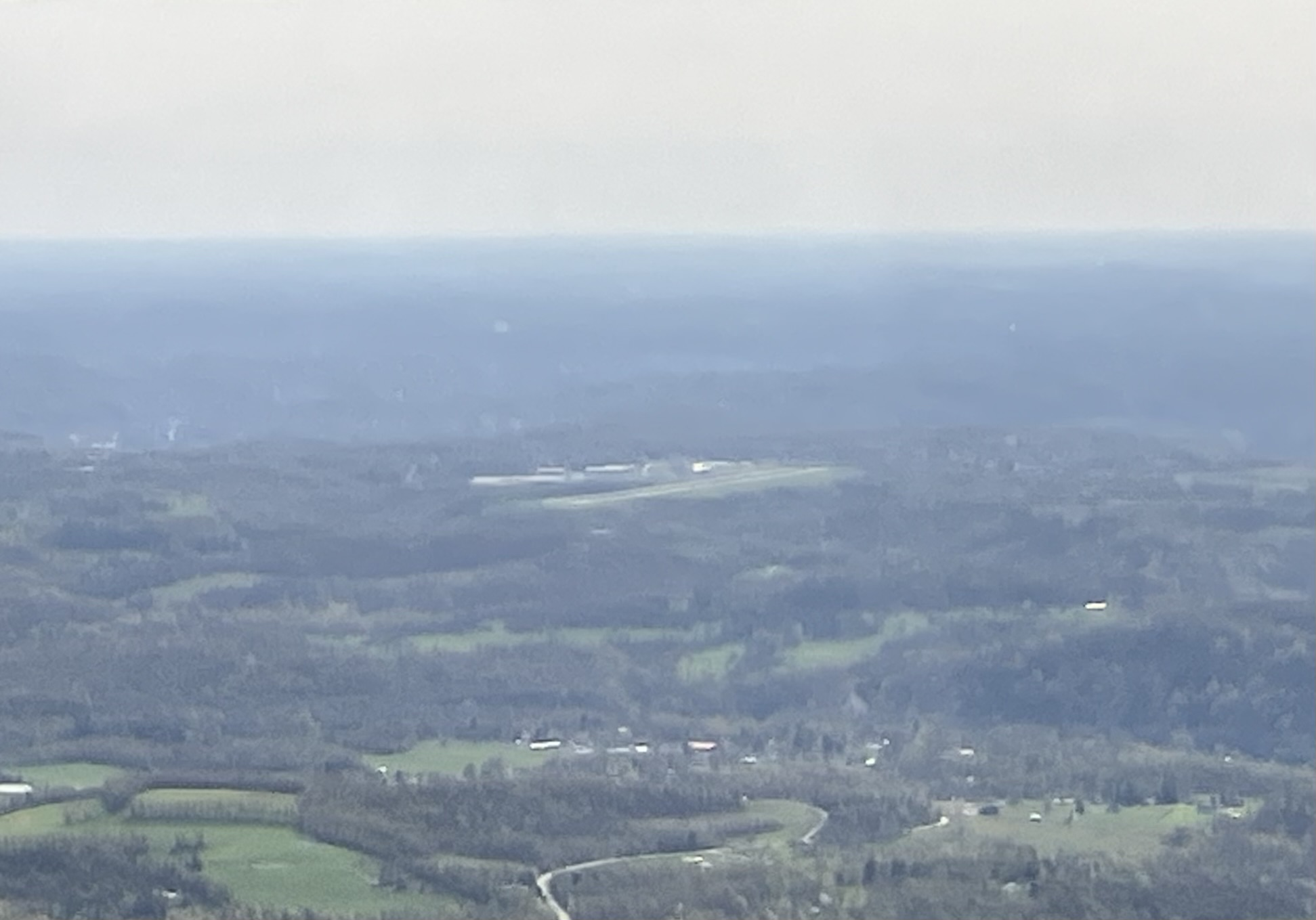
- IATA: none; ICAO: KFWQ; FAA LID: FWQ

Summary
- Airport type: Public
- Owner: Westmoreland County Airport Authority
- Serves: Monongahela, Pennsylvania
- Location: Rostraver Township, Pennsylvania
- Elevation AMSL: 1,228 ft / 374 m
- Coordinates: 40°12′35″N 079°49′53″W

Map
- Location of airport in Pennsylvania FWQ (the United States)

Runways
Direction	Length		Surface
Direction	ft	m	Surface
8/26	4,002	1,220	Asphalt

Statistics (2021)
- Aircraft operations (year ending 5/3/2021): 43,920
- Based aircraft: 45
- Source: Federal Aviation Administration

Rostraver Airport (ICAO: KFWQ, FAA LID: FWQ, formerly P53) is a public use airport in Westmoreland County, Pennsylvania, United States.

== Geography ==
It is located five nautical miles (9 km) east of the central business district of Monongahela, Pennsylvania in Rostraver Township. It is operated by the Westmoreland County Airport Authority, which also operates the Arnold Palmer Regional Airport in Unity Township, Pennsylvania.

This airport is assigned a three-letter location identifier of FWQ by the Federal Aviation Administration, but it does not have an International Air Transport Association (IATA) airport code.

== Facilities and aircraft ==
Rostraver Airport covers an area of 300 acres (120 ha) at an elevation of 1,228 feet (374 m) above mean sea level. It has one asphalt paved runway designated 8/26 which measures 4,002 by 75 feet (1,220 x 23 m).

For the 12-month period ending May 3, 2021, the airport had 43,920 aircraft operations, an average of 120 per day: 98% general aviation, 2% air taxi and <1% military. At that time there were 45 aircraft based at this airport: 40 single-engine, 4 multi-engine, and 1 glider.

== Accidents ==
- On April 12, 2017, John Graham III, CEO of Pittsburgh Institute of Aeronautics, was killed in a plane crash while practicing touch-and-go landings alone due to wind gust.

== See also ==
- List of airports in Pennsylvania
