= Westmoreland County Transit Authority =

- Founded: 1978
- Headquarters: 41 Bell Way
- Locale: Greensburg, Pennsylvania
- Service area: Westmoreland County, Pennsylvania
- Service type: Bus service
- Routes: 17
- Fleet: 42
- Fuel type: Diesel; Compressed Natural Gas
- Website: westmorelandtransit.com

The Westmoreland County Transit Authority (WCTA) is the operator of mass transportation in Westmoreland County, Pennsylvania. Using 35 buses, a total of 18 routes are operated, the majority of which serve the urbanized corridor that makes up the western portion of the county. Bus routes in this area are designed to provide access for suburban commuters to Downtown Pittsburgh, as well as transportation for both workers and shoppers to the large suburbs of Greensburg and New Kensington, Pennsylvania the most prominent entities in the county's boundaries. Rural eastern bus routes allow for commutes to Greensburg and also provide service to the city of Johnstown in neighboring Cambria County.

The service was operated by Forsythe Transportation until July 2012 when acquired by National Express Transit.

On January 1, 2020 the WCTA began to directly operate service, after WCTA and National Express Transit mutually agree to terminate the existing contract.

== Suburban Pittsburgh Routes ==
=== Weekday Routes ===
==== Flyer Routes ====
- 1F Greensburg-Pittsburgh Flyer: Greensburg, Hempfield, Irwin, North Huntingdon to Downtown Pittsburgh via Route 30
- 2F Latrobe-Pittsburgh Flyer: Latrobe, Greensburg, Delmont, Export, Murrysville to Downtown Pittsburgh
- 3F Mount Pleasant-Pittsburgh Flyer: Mount Pleasant, New Stanton Park and Ride, Irwin, North Huntington, Downtown Pittsburgh
- 14F New Kensington-Pittsburgh Flyer: Vandergrift, Lower Burrell, New Kensington to Downtown Pittsburgh

==== Local Routes ====
All routes operate Monday thru Friday. Routes marked with an asterisk (*) indicate the route operates on Saturdays.

- 4 Pittsburgh: Pittsburgh via Route 30 and Oakland*
- 5 Jeannette: Jeannette via Greengate Center (Wal-Mart) Hempfield Square (Giant Eagle), Sam's Club and Route 30 West*
- 6 Irwin: Irwin and Hermine via Route 130, Jeannette, Manor, Westmoreland City, Arona Road and Rilton
- 8 Youngwood/New Stanton/Mt. Pleasant: South Greensburg, Youngwood, Westmoreland County Community College, New Stanton, Mount Pleasant Wal-Mart* (Saturday service does not serve WCCC)
- 9 Latrobe-Derry: Westmoreland Mall, Latrobe, Loyalhanna, Derry with limited service to Ligonier*
- 11 Johnstown - Johnstown via Westmoreland Mall (peak-periods only), Latrobe, Ligonier, New Florence and Seward.
- 12 Greensburg-New Kensington: New Kensington via Delmont Westmoreland Business Park, Penn State New Kensington
- 14 New Kensington Local: New Kensington, Arnold, Lower Burrell, Pittsburgh Mills Wal-Mart*
- 15 Avonmore-New Kensington: Avonmore, Vandergrift
- 16 Greensburg-Mt. Pleasant via UPG: Greensburg and University of Pittsburgh at Greensburg to Norvelt, Mount Pleasant
- 17 Mt. Pleasant-Scottdale*

== Park & Ride Lots ==
- Arnold Palmer Regional Airport (Unity Township) - 100 spaces (Route 2F)
- Five Star Trail (Hempfield Township) - 28 spaces (Routes 1F, 2F, 4, 9)
- Westmoreland Crossing (Hempfield Township) - 45 spaces (Routes 1F, 4, 8)
- Carpenter Lane (North Huntingdon Township) - 250 spaces (Routes 1F, 3F, & 4)
- New Stanton - (New Stanton) - 30 spaces (Routes 3F and 8)
- Countryside Plaza - (Mount Pleasant) - 40 spaces (Routes 3F, 16, 17, and FACT)
- Trinity United Church of Christ (Delmont) - 20 spaces (Routes 2F and 12)
- Living Waters Worship Center (Irwin) - 70 spaces (Routes 1F, 4, and 6)
- Allegheny Plaza (Vandergrift) - (Routes 14F and 15)
- Hillcrest Plaza (Lower Burrell) - (Routes 14, 14F, and 15)

== Fleet ==
- 8 MCI D4000 (Diesel)
- 6 MCI D4500 (Diesel)
- 6 MCI D4500 (CNG)
- 8 Gillig 35-foot CNG buses
- 1 Gillig 30-foot Diesel Bus
- 11 Ford F550 CNG Buses
