= List of defunct airports in the United States =

This is a list of defunct or abandoned airports in the United States.

Note: A more complete list of abandoned airfields in the US can be found at the website that is cited in many of the entries below.

== Alabama ==
There are at least 68 in the state.

- Anniston Army Airfield
- Barin Naval Auxiliary Air Station
- Brundidge Municipal Airport
- Coosa County Airport (69A)
- Eutaw Municipal Airport
- Faircloth Naval Outlying Landing Field
- Freddie Jones Field
- Fort McClellan Army Airfield
- Fort Morgan Airfield
- Mallard Airport
- Moundville Airport
- Naval Outlying Landing Field Magnolia
- Perry County Airport
- Selfield Aux AAF § 1
- Skywest Airpark
- Silverhill Naval Outer Landing Field
- Skyharbor Airport
- South Huntsville Airport
- Summerdale Naval Outer Landing Field (NFD)
- Tuskegee Army Airfield
- Uniontown Airport
- Wheelless Airport
- Wolf Naval Outer Landing Field

== Alaska ==
- Arness Lake Airport
- Cape Sabine Airport
- Chignik Fisheries Airport
- Gunsight Mountain Airport
- Fort Glenn Army Airstrip
- Haycock Airport
- Loring Seaplane Base
- Lost River 1 Airport
- Jonesville Mine Airport
- Lake Louise Airport
- Miller Army Airfield
- Myrtle Creek Airport
- Pauloff Harbor Seaplane Base
- Porcupine Creek Airport
- Oliktok LRRS Airport
- PAF Cannery Airport (Pacific American Fisheries)
- Sagwon Airport
- Skelton Airport
- Tahneta Pass Airport
- Tok Airport
- Weeks Field

== Arizona ==
- Air Haven Airport
- Bowie Airport
- Ganado Airport
- Forepaugh Airport
- Lake Havasu City Airport (the original location)
- Red Butte Aerodrome/Grand Canyon Airport
- Sahuarita AF Flight Strip
- Transwestern Pipeline Company Airfield
- Three Point Airport
- Tuweep Airport
- Turf Paradise Airfield

== Arkansas ==
- Dennis F. Cantrell Field
- Lost Bridge Village Airport
- Saline County Airport (Watts Field) in Benton
- Silver Wings Field in Eureka Springs

== California ==
- Alum Rock Airport
- Amboy Airfield
- Apple Valley Airport
- Brown-Fabian Airport
- Cal Poly, San Luis Obispo
- Capital Sky Park, West Sacramento
- Capistrano Airport, San Juan Capistrano
- Carmel Valley Airport
- Colton Airport, Colton
- Crissy Field
- Crawford Airport
- Culver City Airport, Culver City
- Deer Creek Ranch Airport
- Del Mar Municipal Airport
- Disneyland Helipad
- Fontana
- Dycer Airport, Gardena
- Gardena Valley Airport, Gardena
- Gardner Army Airfield
- Giant Rock, Yucca Valley
- Grand Central Airport
- Green Acres, Visalia
- Griffith Park Aerodrome
- Gelderman Airport
- Luebkeman Airport
- Hamilton Air Force Base
- Hamilton Cove Seaplane Base
- Hamilton Army Airfield
- Mare Island Naval Shipyard Airfield
- Helendale Airport
- Hilton Field, Boulder Creek
- Hughes Airport
- Marine Corps Air Station El Toro
- Marine Corps Air Station Tustin
- Meadowlark Airport
- Milpitas Airport
- Mission Airport, San Gabriel
- Monrovia Airport, California
- Montebello Airport
- Vail Airport, Montebello
- Natomas Field, Sacramento
- Naval Air Station Alameda
- North Shore Beach Estates, Salton Sea
- Quartz Hill Airport
- Rancho California Airport, Temecula
- Conejo Valley Airport, Thousand Oaks
- Rialto Municipal Airport
- Rice Army Airfield
- Rosemead Airport, Rosemead
- Santa Susana Airport
- San Fernando Airport
- Skyways Airport
- Sierra Airdrome, also called Hastings Airport
- Sacramento Sky Ranch
- Santa Cruz Sky Park
- Sky Ranch, Puente
- Spring Valley Airport
- Soggy Dry Lake, Lucerne Valley
- Tri-City Airport, Loma Linda
- Thompson, Murrieta
- Valley View, Ridgecrest
- War Eagle Field
- Willow Creek

== Colorado ==
- Avon STOLPort
- Breckenridge STOLport
- Fort Collins Downtown Airport
- Nichols Field (Colorado Springs)
- Stapleton International Airport (Denver)
- Skyline Airport (Watkins, Colorado)

== Connecticut ==
- Ansonia
- Griswold Airport/Hammonasset Airport (N04) in Madison
- Johnnycake/Mountain Meadow Airstrip in Burlington
- Lakeside Airport
- New Canaan
- New London–Waterford Airport in Waterford
- Rentschler Field
- Stamford

== Delaware ==
- Rehoboth Beach

== District of Columbia ==
- Naval Air Station Anacostia
- Bolling Air Force Base

== Florida ==
- Epcot Center Ultralight Flightpark
- Imeson Field
- Naval Air Station Richmond
- Opa-locka West Airport
- Panama City–Bay County International Airport
- Taylor Field
- Tallahassee Commercial Airport
- Tampa Bay Executive Airport

== Georgia ==
- Liberty County Airport
- Morris Army Airfield
- Naval Air Station Glynco
- Naval Air Station Atlanta
- South Fulton Skyport (8A9) Palmetto
- Turner Air Force Base
- Stone Mountain Airport

== Hawaii ==
- Haleiwa Fighter Strip
- Kaanapali Airport
- Kipapa Airfield
- Kona Airport
- Kualoa Airfield
- Marine Corps Air Station Ewa
- Morse Field
- MCAS Ewa
- Naval Auxiliary Landing Field Ford Island
- Puunene Naval Air Station
- Stanley Army Airfield

== Idaho ==
- Strawberry Glenn Airport in Boise

== Illinois ==
- Arlington NOLF / Arlington Airport
- Ashburn Flying Field
- Carthage Airport
- Chicagoland Airport
- Crestwood/Howell Airport
- Earlville Airport
- Half Day Naval Outlying Landing Field
- Hillsboro Municipal Airport
- Howell-New Lenox Airport
- Machesney Airport
- Meigs Field
- Naval Air Station Glenview
- Ravenswood Airport
- Springfield (Commercial) Southwest Municipal Airport
- Sky Harbor Airport
- Wagon Wheel Airport

== Indiana ==
- Action Airpark
- Aretz Airport
- Butler
- Decatur Hi-Way Airport
- Dresser Field
- Elwood Airport
- Emison Auxiliary Army Airfield
- Harrold Airport
- Michigan City Municipal
- O'Neal Airport
- Speedway Airport
- Stout Army Air Field
- Walesboro Auxiliary Army Airfield

== Iowa ==
- Hawarden Municipal Airport
- Eldora Municipal Airport
- Lambert Fechter Municipal Airport
- NOLF Linby
- Wall Lake Municipal Airport

== Kansas ==
- Hamilton Field
- Wilroads Gardens Airport
- Paul Windle Municipal Airport
- Fairfax Municipal Airport
- Plainville Airpark
- Stockton Municipal Airport
- Maize Airport

== Kentucky ==
- Dale Hollow Regional Airport (Petro Field)
- Hardin County Airport (Ben Floyd Field)
- Standard Field
- Morehead-Rowan County Airport
- Breckenridge Army Airfield
- Olive Hill Airport
- Whitesburg Municipal Airport

== Louisiana ==
- Colfax Airport
- Downtown Airport
- Haynesville Airport
- Charlie Hammonds Seaplane Base
- East Lake Charles Airport
- Ruston Municipal Airport

== Maine ==
- St. Croix Airport
- Naval Air Station Brunswick

== Maryland ==
- Baltimore Airpark
- Baltimore Municipal Airport
- Congressional Airport
- Hyde Field
- Schromm Field

== Massachusetts ==
- Agawam-Springfield Harbor Seaplane Base in Agawam
- Bowles Agawam Airport in Agawam
- Braintree Airport
- Chatham Seaplane Base in Chatham
- Fall River Municipal Airport
- Haverhill Riverside Seaplane Base in Haverhill
- Marlboro
- Merrimac Valley Seaplane Base in Methuen
- Monponsett Pond Seaplane Base in Halifax
- Naval Air Station South Weymouth
- Naval Air Station Squantum
- Springfield Airport
- Tew-Mac Airport

== Michigan ==
- Acme Skyport (closed 1995?)
- Allen Airport
- Allens Airport
- Alma Airport / Sharrard's Field
- Anchor Bay Field, a/k/a Fair Haven Field
- Au Gres Airport
- Austin Lake Airport & Seaplane Base
- Aviation Country Club
- Baker Airport
- Bean Blossom Airport
- Beaverton
- Berz-Macomb
- Big Beaver Airport
- Bonnie Field
- Brooklyn Airfield
- Burns Airport
- Burns Landing Field
- Calumet-Laurium Airport / Houghton County Airport
- Carriage Lane Airport
- Coleman A. Young International Airport a/k/a Detroit City Airport
- Corunna Airport
- Craft's Field
- Crystal Falls Airport
- David Airfield / David's Airport
- Davis Airport
- Detroit Army Artillery Armory Airfield, Oak Park
- Double JJ Resort Ranch Airport
- Douglas Lakeside Airport
- Dr. A.L. Haight Airport
- Dudley Airport Standish
- Erie Aerodrome
- Erin Airport
- Farmington Hills Airfield
- Flat Rock Airport / Maveal Airport / Maveal Brothers Airport
- Ford Airport
- Fraser Airport
- Grand Rapids Municipal Airport / See Kent County Airport
- Grand River Airpark & Seaplane Base
- Gratiot Airport, a/k/a Packard Field, Greater Detroit Airport or Roseville Field.
- Haggerty Field / Detroit Aviation Testing Field
- Hance Airport
- Hartung Field
- Hillsdale Airport
- Holly Airport
- Houghton County Airport
- Houghton-Hancock Landing Field / Isle Royale Sands Airport / Houghton Sands Airport & Seaplane Base, Houghton, MI
- Ishpeming Airport / Ishpeming-Dexter Airport
- John R. Airport
- Jonesville Airport / Merchant Field
- Krist Port
- Leathers Field / Naval Outer Landing Field 24922 Grosse Ile
- Loar's Field, Onsted, Michigan
- Marks' Field
- Marquette County Airport
- Marysville Field
- Mason Landing Field / Kelleys Airport
- Mayes Airport
- McEnnan Airport
- McKinley Airport
- Menominee County Airport
- Miller Airport /Nartron Field
- Morgan Field
- Motor Boat Seaplane Base / Garland's Seaplane Base
- Muzzy's Airport / L'Anse Landing Field
- Nan Bar Airport / NOLF 27106 / Flat Rock Field
- National Airways Airport / National Air Service Airport / National Airport
- Oakland-Orion Airport
- Oselka Airport
- Packard Field, renamed Gratiot Airport in 1940, Roseville, Michigan a/k/a Greater Detroit Airport or Roseville Field.
- Haggerty Field / Detroit Aviation Testing Field
- Packard Proving Ground Airfield
- Plane Haven Airport
- Poschke's Harbor Beach Airport
- Raco Army Landing Airfield
- Ransom Field/Traverse City Ransom Field (closed 1969)
- Rexton Airport / D A R Airport
- Riverland Airfield
- Robbins Airport (Madision Heights)
- Saugatuck-Douglas Airport
- Salem Airport
- Scheidler Field
- Sheep Ranch NOLF
- Silver Ace Airport / Monroe Airport / Marshall Airport
- Smith Airport / Hartsell Air Terminal / National Airport
- South Kent Airport
- Spencer Landing Field / Spencer Airport / Vernon M Spencer Memorial Airfield / Wixom International Airport
- Standish City Airport / Standish Industrial Airport a/k/a Dudley Airport.
- Stinson Factory Airfield
- Sunglen Airfield
- Tackaberry Airport Michigan Airport Directory
- Thomas B. Joy Airport
- Triangle Airport
- Triangle Glider Port
- Trott Brothers Airport / Almont Municipal Airport
- Utica Airport
- Vanderbilt Airport (1st location)
- Vanderbilt Airfield (2nd location)
- Vanderbilt Airport
- Warren Airport, a/k/a Kinally Airport
- Washtenaw Airport/ Young Airport
- Wings Airport, Mound Road & 18 Mile Road in what is now Sterling Heights, Michigan.
- Ypsilanti Airport / Gridley Airport
- Yuba Airport

== Minnesota ==
There are at least twenty in the state.

- Devil's Track Municipal Airport
- Grand Rapids–Itasca County Airport, Gordy Newstrom Field
- New York Mills Municipal Airport
- Pine City Municipal Airport

== Mississippi ==
- Fulton-Itawamba County Airport
- Jackson County Airport
- Stinson Field Municipal Airport (Aberdeen)

== Missouri ==
- Bonne Terre Memorial Airport
- Myers Park Memorial Municipal Airport
- Columbia Municipal Airport
- E.W. Cotton Woods Memorial Airport
- Richards-Gebaur Airport
- Independence Memorial Airport
- Lake Winnebago Municipal Airport
- Air Park South
- Princeton-Kauffman Memorial Airport
- St. Charles Airport
- Arrowhead Airport
- Weiss Airport

== Montana ==
- Belle Creek Airport
- Broadus Airport
- Glasgow Air Force Base
- Glendive Airport
- Mountain Lakes Field
- Morgan Airport
- Poplar Airport
- Veseth Airport
- Whitehall Intermediate Field

== Nebraska ==
- Arthur Municipal Airport
- Bruning Army Airfield
- Harrison Skyranch
- McCook Army Airfield
- Grundman Field
- South Omaha Airport
- Springview Municipal Airport
- Wilber Municipal Airport

== Nevada ==
- Anderson Field
- Barton Field
- Boulder City Airport
- Buffalo Valley Intermediate Field
- Chicken Ranch Airfield
- Caliente Flight Strip
- Delamar Landing Field
- Goldfield Airport
- Hidden Hills Airport
- Jackass Aeropark (Lathrop Wells Airport)
- Pioche Municipal Airport
- Sky Corral Airport
- Sutcliffe Naval Outlying Landing Field
- Tonopah Test Range (Mellan Airstrip)
- Voc-Tech Airfield

== New Jersey ==
- Aero Haven Airport/Camden County Airport
- Asbury Park Neptune Airport
- Atlantic City Municipal Airport
- Camden Central Airport
- Colts Neck Airport
- Crescent Airport
- Li Calzi Airport
- Marlboro Airport
- Twin Pine Airport
- Forrestal Airport
- Rudy's Airport
- Piney Hollow Airfield

== New Mexico ==
- Alamo Navajo Airport
- Oxnard Field
- Coronado Airport
- West Mesa Airport
- Eunice Airport

== New York ==
- Angola Airport
- Ellenville Airport
- Floyd Bennett Field (a small portion is still used as a police heliport)
- Flushing Airport in Queens
- Holmes Airport, aka Grand Central Air Terminal, Grand Central Airport in Queens
- McPherson Seaplane Base in Ithaca
- Miller Field in Staten Island
- Mitchel Field
- Monticello Airport
- Oneida County Airport
- Peekskill Seaplane Base
- Roosevelt Field, aka Hempstead Plains Aerodrome, Hempstead Plains Field, Garden City Aerodrome, Hazelhurst Field in Mineola

== North Carolina ==
- Johnson Field
- Brockenbrough Airport
- Halifax County Airport
- Raleigh Municipal Airport
- Wilgrove Airpark

== North Dakota ==
- Pruetz Municipal Airport
- Wimbledon Airport

== Ohio ==
- Chagrin Falls Airport
- Champion Executive Airport
- Chardon Airfield
- Cincinnati–Blue Ash Airport
- Freedom Air Field
- Griffing Sandusky Airport
- Martin Airport
- Mid-City Airport
- South Columbus Airport
- Southern Airways Airport/Boardman Air Park
- Strongsville Airpark
- Youngstown Executive Airport

== Oklahoma ==
- Teramiranda Airport
- Idabel Airport
- Love County Airport
- Ashley Airport
- Sky Park Airport
- Oklahoma City Downtown Airpark

== Oregon ==
- Naval Air Station Tongue Point
- Bernard's Airport
- Willamette Airpark (T-Bird Airport)
- Jantzen Beach Seaplane Base
- Swan Island Airport (Portland Municipal)
- Springfield Airport
- Sutherlin Airport
- Umatilla Army Airfield

== Pennsylvania ==
- Aliquippa Airport
- Birchwood–Pocono Airport
- Cherry Springs Airport
- Echo Airport
- Erie County Airport
- Glade Mill Airport
- Hershey Airpark
- Huntingdon County Airport
- Indian Lake Airport
- Kutztown Airport
- McGinness Airport
- McVille Airport
- Miller Airport
- Mustin Field
- Olmsted Air Force Base
- Seven Springs Airport
- State College Air Depot

== Rhode Island ==
- Charlestown NAAS (Atlantic Airport)
- Newport Naval Air Facility
- Naval Air Station Quonset Point

== South Carolina ==
- Chinquapin Airport
- Coulbourne Airport
- Lane Airport
- Naval Air Station Charleston
- Page Field
- State Line Ultraport/Flightpark

== South Dakota ==
- Dupree Municipal Airport
- Harrold Municipal Airport
- Skie Air Service Landing Field
- McIntosh Municipal Airport
- Mission Sioux Airport

== Tennessee ==
- Arlington Municipal Airport
- Cornelia Fort Airpark
- Franklin Wilkins Airport
- Powell STOLport
- Putnam County Airport
- Scott Field (Decatur County Airport)

== Texas ==
- Abilene Municipal Airport (original)
- Amarillo Municipal Airport (original)
- An Khe Army Stage Field / Walker Red Fox Airfield (Authon)
- Andrau Airpark (Alief)
- Arlington Municipal Airport / Midway Airport / Greater Fort Worth International Airport / Amon Carter Field / Greater Southwest International Airport
- Bay City Municipal Airport (original)
- Bell Helicopter Auxiliary Heliport (Hurst)
- Butterfield Trail Airport (North Abiline)
- Cameron Airport (Angleton)
- Camp Wolters / Fort Wolters Army Heliport (Mineral Wells)
- Clear Lake Metro Port (Clear Lake City)
- Clear Lake Ranch Airfield (Mankins)
- Columbus Municipal Airport (original)
- Cuero Field / Brayton Flying Field
- D-Bar Ranch Airfield (Sanco)
- Dalhart Aux AAF #1 / West Field
- Dalhart Aux AAF #2 / Miller Field
- Dalworth Airport / Curtiss-Wright Airport /Grand Prairie Municipal Airport / Grand Prairie NOLF /Grand Prairie Army Airfield
- Davis Auxiliary Army Airfield #3 (League City)
- Dempsey Army Heliport (Palo Pinto)
- Denton Field / College Field
- Downing Army Heliport (Mineral Wells)
- Eagle Pass Army Airfield
- Eagle Pass Auxiliary Army Airfield #1 / Cueves Field (Spofford)
- Eagle Pass Auxiliary Army Airfield #3 / Barnard Ranch Airfield / Chittim Ranch Airfield (Eagle Pass)
- Eagle Pass Municipal Airport
- El Paso Municipal Airport (original)
- Five-Points Field / Naval Outlying Landing Field 22913 (Watsonville)
- Fort Wolters Army Stage Field #1 / Pinto Stagefield (Garner)
- Fort Wolters Army Stage Field #2 / Sundance Stage Field (Salesville)
- Fort Wolters Army Stage Field #3 / Ramrod Stage Field (Garner)
- Fort Wolters Army Stage Field #4 / Mustang Stage Field (Salesville)
- Fort Wolters Stage Field #6 / Bronco Stage Field (Garner)
- Genoa Airport
- Goodfellow AAF / Goodfellow AFB (San Angelo)
- Guenther Municipal Airport / Guenther La Grange Airport
- Hartlee Field (Denton)
- Hensley Field / Dallas Naval Air Station
- Hitchcock Naval Air Station
- Horizon Airport (West Texas Airport)
- Hue Stage Field (Garner)
- Hueco Airport (El Paso)
- Howard County Municipal Airport (Big Spring)
- Jap Lee Airport (Irving)
- KFDA-TV Airfield (Amarillo)
- Lamesa Field (Arvana)
- Laredo Air Force Auxiliary Airfield #2 (Aguilares)
- Laredo Municipal Airport (Del Mar)
- Link Ranch Airfield (Laredo)
- Lite-Flite Ultraport (Katy)
- Lou Foote Airport / Highway 77 Airport (Dallas)
- Lubbock Army Airfield / Reese AFB
- MacGuire Ranch Airfield (El Paso)
- Maker Field / Hughes Airport (Abiline)
- Mansfield Naval Outlying Landing Field / OLF 22614
- Pampa Army Airfield
- Pearland Municipal Airport
- Qui Nhon Army Stage Field (Salesville)
- Red Bluff Auxiliary Army Airfield #1 (Seabrook)
- Reeves Auxiliary Army Airfield #1 / Pampa Air Force Auxiliary Airfield #2
- Rhodes Airport / Shallowater Airport
- Robert Mueller Municipal Airport (Austin)
- S & S Patrol Field (League City)
- Skyport Airport (El Paso)
- Spaceland Airport / Houston Gulf Airport (League City)
- Sugar Land State Prison Airfield
- Tarrant Naval Outlying Landing Field / Arlington Naval Outlying Landing Field / OLF 25811 (Arlington)
- Terry County Air Force Auxiliary Airfield / Reese Air Force Auxiliary Airfield (Sundown)
- Tim's Airpark / Austin Executive Airpark
- U & S Flying Service Airfield / Hamilton Field (Big Spring)
- Val Verde County Airport (Del Rio)
- Vancourt Army Airfield Aux #6 (Wall)
- Victory Field (Vernon)
- Vung Tau Army Stage Field
- Weiser Airpark (Cypress) KEYQ
- Winn Exploration Company Airport (Eagle Pass)

== Utah ==
- Jake Garn Airport
- Tooele Municipal Airport
- Tremonton Municipal Airport

== Vermont ==
- Fair Haven Municipal Airport
- Robin's Nest Airport (North Windham Airport)
- Miller Airport

== Virginia ==
- Beacon Field Airport
- Falls Church Airpark
- Hartwood Airport
- Hoover Field
- Parnell Airport (Richmond)
- Pungo NOLF
- Tappahannock Municipal Airport
- University of Virginia Airport / Milton Field (Charlottesville)
- Virginia State Police Airport (Richmond)
- Washington Airport
- Washington-Hoover Airport
- Washington-Virginia Airport

== Washington ==
- Bellevue Airfield
- Blaine Municipal Airport
- Evergreen Field
- J-Z Airport
- Martha Lake Airport
- Sky Harbor Airport
- Vista Field

== West Virginia ==
- Roy Airfield
- Weirton Airport

== Wisconsin ==
- Rice Lake Municipal Airport
- Aero Park Airport
- Westosha Airport

== Wyoming ==
- Wardwell Field
- Douglas Municipal Airport

== Insular areas ==
=== American Samoa ===
- Leone Airfield

=== Guam ===
- Guam Northwest Army Airfield
- Orote Field
- Northwest Field

=== Johnston Atoll ===
- Johnston Atoll Airport

=== Midway Atoll ===
- Henderson Field

=== Palmyra Atoll ===
- Palmyra Atoll Airfield
- Palmyra Runway

=== Northern Mariana Islands ===
- North Field

=== Puerto Rico ===
- Camp Garcia Vieques
- Dorado Airport
- Losey Army Airfield
- Salinas Auxiliary Aerodrome
- Santa Isabel Auxiliary Airdrome
- Ramey Air Force Base
- Roosevelt Roads Naval Station
- Vega Baja Auxiliary Aerodrome

== Fictional ==
- Betio Airfield, an airport appearing in the video game Call of Duty: World at War – Final Fronts; its name is written on the third campaign level
- Verdant Meadows Airfield, an airstrip based on Davis–Monthan Air Force Base and appearing in the video game Grand Theft Auto: San Andreas
- Sandy Shores Airfield, an airfield based on Amboy Airfield and appearing in the video game Grand Theft Auto V
