= Quinn Porter =

American football player (born 1986)

No. 35, 23
- Position: Running back

Personal information
- Born: February 2, 1986 (age 40); Los Angeles, California, U.S.
- Listed height: 6 ft 0 in (1.83 m)
- Listed weight: 205 lb (93 kg)

Career information
- High school: Quartz Hill (Quartz Hill, California)
- College: Stillman
- NFL draft: 2010: undrafted

Career history
- Green Bay Packers (2010)*; Washington Redskins (2010)*; Cleveland Browns (2010–2011)*; St. Louis Rams (2011); Toronto Argonauts (2013); FCF Beasts (2021–2022)
- * Offseason or practice squad member only

Career NFL statistics
- Return yards: 555
- Stats at Pro Football Reference

Quinn Purnell Porter (born February 2, 1986) is an American former professional football player who was a running back in the National Football League (NFL) and Canadian Football League (CFL). He was signed by the NFL's Green Bay Packers as an undrafted free agent in 2010. He played college football for the Stillman Tigers.

He was also a member of the Washington Redskins, Cleveland Browns, St. Louis Rams, Toronto Argonauts and FCF Beasts.

== Early life and college ==
Porter attended Quartz Hill High School in Quartz Hill, California.

Porter was academically ineligible to play college football his freshman year at Stillman College and was instead a member of the cheerleading team.

== Professional career ==
Porter signed with the Green Bay Packers on April 30, 2010. He was waived/injured on August 31, 2010 and reverted to injured reserve the next day. He was waived by the Packers on September 4, 2010.

He was signed to the practice squad of the Washington Redskins on October 7, 2010. He was released on October 26, 2010.

Porter was signed to the practice squad of the Cleveland Browns on November 23, 2010. He signed a reserve/future contract with the Browns on January 4, 2011. He was waived on September 3, 2011 and signed to the team's practice squad on September 5, 2011. He was released by the Browns on September 14, 2011.

Porter signed with the St. Louis Rams on September 14, 2011. He appeared in 12 games for the Rams during the 2011 season, returning 25 kicks for 554 yards while also recording four solo tackles and one assisted tackle. He was waived on April 30, 2012.

Porter signed with the Toronto Argonauts of the Canadian Football League on May 2, 2013. He played in six games, starting one, for the Argonauts in 2013. On September 21, 2013, Porter was released by the Argonauts.

After seven years out of football, he signed with Fan Controlled Football for its inaugural 2021 season. He played for the Beasts. Porter was franchise tagged by the Beasts on March 13, 2022.
