= Big Beaver (disambiguation) =

Big Beaver is a borough in Beaver County, Pennsylvania.

Big Beaver may also refer to:

- Big Beaver, Saskatchewan, a hamlet in Canada

== See also ==
- Big Beaver Airport, Troy, Michigan
- Big Beaver Creek, Lancaster County, Pennsylvania
- Big Beaver Road, Oakland County, Michigan
- Big Beaver Totem Pole, Chicago, Illinois
- Giant beaver (disambiguation)
