= 2K2 =

2K2 may refer to:

- the year 2002
- Olfactory receptor 2K2
- the location identifier for Air Park South, a former American airport in Missouri

== Video games ==
- NBA 2K2, 2001 video game
- NCAA College Football 2K2, 2001 video game
- NFL 2K2, 2001 video game
- NHL 2K2, 2002 video game
- Tennis 2K2, 2001 vivdeo game
- World Series Baseball 2K2, 2001 video game
