= Beanblossom =

Beanblossom or Bean Blossom may refer to:

- Beanblossom, Indiana, an unincorporated community
- Beanblossom Creek, a stream in Indiana
- Bean Blossom Airport, an airport in Michigan
- Bean Blossom Township, Monroe County, Indiana
