= N75 =

N75 may refer to:

== Roads ==
- N75 road (Ireland)
- N-75 National Highway, in Pakistan
- Davao–Cotabato Road, in the Philippines

== Other uses ==
- Escadrille N.75, a unit of the French Air Force
- Gurr-Goni language
- HMS Parthian (N75), a submarine of the Royal Navy
- Nikon N75, an SLR camera
- Nokia N75, a mobile phone
- Twin Pine Airport, in Mercer County, New Jersey, United States
