= Naval Air Station Livermore =

Former US Navy station in California

Coordinates: 37.686°N 121.706°W

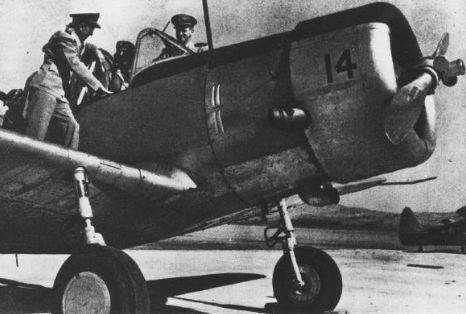
Naval Air Station Livermore in 1944 training pilot in a SNV, a Vultee BT-13 Valiant

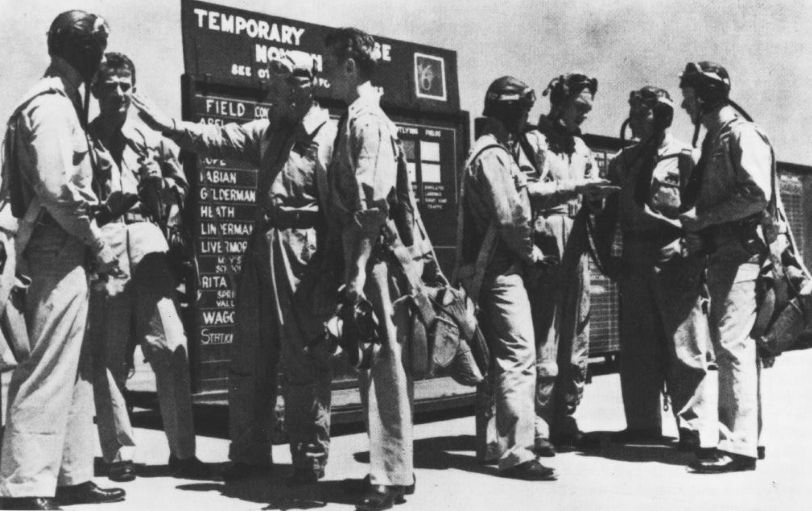
Cadets and instructors check the flight assignment board at Naval Air Station Livermore in 1944

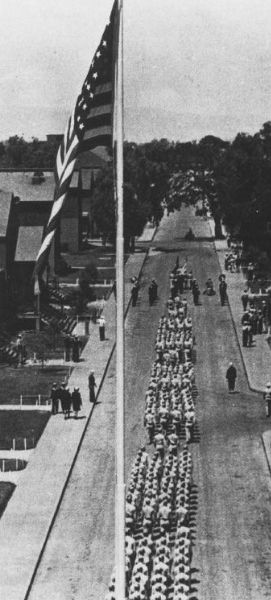
Air Cadets marching at Naval Air Station Livermore in 1944

Naval Air Station Livermore was a United States Navy military facility located in Livermore, California.

== History ==
This station was built in 1942 four miles east of Livermore to relieve overcrowding of the naval air facilities at Naval Air Station Oakland. The primary mission of the base was to train pilots. On 5 January 1951, the Bureau of Yards and Docks, U.S. Navy, formally transferred the former NAS Livermore in its entirety to the Atomic Energy Commission (AEC) for use by the University of California's Radiation Laboratory. Although the Public Buildings Service, General Services Administration, was informed that the facility was surplus, documentation supports the direct transfer of the former NAS Livermore from the U.S. Navy to the Atomic Energy Commission and redeveloped into the Lawrence Livermore National Laboratory.

On March 12, 1944, the Jack Benny Radio Program broadcast live at the base. Jack Benny, Don Wilson (announcer), Dennis Day, Mary Livingstone, Phil Harris, and Eddie "Rochester" Anderson were the cast.

Actor Robert Taylor (actor) (August 5, 1911 - June 8, 1969) served in the United States Naval Corp from 1943 to 1945. In January 1944, he started serving as a flight instructor at Livermore.

== Outlying fields ==
NAS Livermore had the following outlying fields (OLFs) during the war (1943-1945):

- Abel Field
- Brown-Fabian Airport
- Cope Field
- Gelderman Airport
- Heath Airport
- Linderman Airport
- Livermore Airport
- May's School Field
- Rita Butterworth Airport
- Spring Valley Airport
- Wagoner Airport

== See also ==
- California during World War II
- American Theater (1939–1945)
- United States home front during World War II
