= Agawam-Springfield Harbor Seaplane Base =

- IATA: none; ICAO: none; FAA LID: 07L

Summary
- Operator: Private
- Location: Agawam, Massachusetts
- Built: Unknown
- In use: Circa 1945
- Occupants: Private
- Elevation AMSL: 192 ft / 59 m
- Coordinates: 42°2′51.46″N 72°36′39.41″W
- Interactive map of Agawam-Springfield Harbor Seaplane Base

Runways
Direction	Length		Surface
Direction	ft	m	Surface
North-South	8,000	2,438	Water

Agawam-Springfield Harbor Seaplane Base was a seaplane base (seaplane landing area) in Agawam, Massachusetts. It featured a landing area (water runway) of 8000 feet on the Connecticut River.

In the mid 20th century it was a full time business with a location at 1000 River Road in Agawam, and was attended with regular business hours. At some point in the 1980s, it became an unattended seaplane landing area. At some point in the early 2000s, the seaplane base symbol disappeared from FAA sectional charts, and the FAA identifier was changed from MA11 to 07L.

Seaplanes can still land on the river in this area, but no official FAA seaplane base designation remains.
