= Quartz Hill High School =

Location
- 6040 West Avenue L Quartz Hill, California 93536; 34°39′29″N 118°14′18″W

Information
- School type: Public high school
- Established: 1964
- School district: Antelope Valley Union High School District
- Principal: Laura Tweedy-Ferguson
- Teaching staff: 118.56 (FTE)
- Grades: 9–12
- Age range: 14-18
- Enrollment: 2,975 (2018–19)
- Student to teacher ratio: 25.09
- Campus type: Rural
- Colors: Carolina blue and gold
- Mascot: Royals
- Accreditation: Western Association of Schools and Colleges
- Newspaper: The Ubiquity
- Yearbook: The Cavalier
- Website: www.quartzhillhs.org

Quartz Hill High School is a public, co-educational high school located in Quartz Hill, California. Founded in 1964, it is the third oldest comprehensive high school in the Antelope Valley Union High School District.

== Campus ==
The basic layout of Quartz Hill High School's 80-acre (320,000 m^{2}) campus is a courtyard surrounded by three quads and athletic buildings, a design that is typical of high schools in Southern California. The school's campus was originally designed for 1,800 students, but over two times that number are currently enrolled. In the school year 2008–2009, there is a reported number of over 3000 students now attending the school, some being foreign exchange students.

From the summer of 2003 to the fall of 2004, Quartz Hill High School's campus underwent a $15 million modernization that updated a majority of the school's classrooms.

== Student body ==
Quartz Hill High School consists of approximately 3,200 students and growing. Most of the school's students live in Quartz Hill, Palmdale and Lancaster, cities in the Antelope Valley of northern Los Angeles County.

- American Indian: 0.1%
- White: 27.6%
- Filipino: 1.8%
- Asian: 5.1%
- African American: 14.9%
- Hispanic: 42.2%
- 2 or More Races: 8.3%

== Academics ==
Quartz Hill High School is one of 65 high schools in California to offer the International Baccalaureate (IB) Diploma Programme, which began at the school in 1998. Advanced Placement (AP) classes are also available in nearly all academic departments.

== Sports ==
The sports program at Quartz Hill High School includes football, baseball, softball, basketball, soccer, cross country, track and field, tennis, swimming, wrestling, volleyball, golf and dance. The men's cross country team is known as the most successful sports program in the past ten years at Quartz Hill. Under the helm of Head Coach Matthew Bierowicz, the Quartz Hill cross country team has risen to one of the most prominent cross country programs in all of California.

In 2015, boys' volleyball went undefeated in league play. The team competed in the CIF Southern Section playoffs where they went to the finals. Teams began interscholastic competition in the mid-1960s.

The mascot of Quartz Hill High School was formerly the Rebel, a Confederate soldier, beginning in the late 1950s. On June 18, 2020, school district administrators announced that the Rebel mascot and name would no longer be used by the school. The change came during a wave of protests in the wake of the murder of George Floyd. Decided in 2020, the new mascot is the Royal.

== Planned school attack ==
On December 15, 2005, two former Quartz Hill students were arrested for planning a Columbine style massacre at the school. The two youths allegedly intended to attack the school on February 14, 2006. News reports described them as goths and indicated that they had accumulated knives, ammunition, a gas mask and bomb-making instructions. They were charged on December 19, 2005, with conspiracy to commit murder.

Tensions flared again on January 13, 2006, when a rumor that the former students who had been arrested would again attempt to attack the school using pipe-bombs. According to Principal Mark Bryant, the planned attacks were merely "rumor, upon rumor, upon rumor." This "Friday the 13th" rumor was passed between students via internet messages and cell-phone text messages. In response to the threat, nearly 50% of the student body was absent from the campus by the time the school day had finished. In the end, the only disruption to the day was a firecracker explosion within a trash can during the school's lunch break.

== Notable alumni ==
- Rick Garcia - News anchor in Los Angeles
- George Murdoch - actor, cable television political commentator, former professional wrestler
- Bradley Steven Perry - teen actor
- Michelle Perry - Silver medalist in heptathlon, at NCAA Outdoor Championships in 2001, competitor in the 2004 Summer Olympics.
