= OR2K2 =

Protein-coding gene in the species Homo sapiens

Identifiers
- Aliases: OR2K2, HSHTPCRH06, HTPCRH06, OR2AN1P, OR2AR1P, olfactory receptor family 2 subfamily K member 2
- External IDs: MGI: 3030101; GeneCards: OR2K2

Gene location (Human)
Chr.	Chromosome 9 (human)
Band	9q31.3	Start	111,327,229 bp
Band	9q31.3	End	111,330,224 bp

Gene location (Mouse)
Chr.	Chromosome 4 (mouse)
Band	4|4 B3	Start	58,782,704 bp
Band	4|4 B3	End	58,787,716 bp
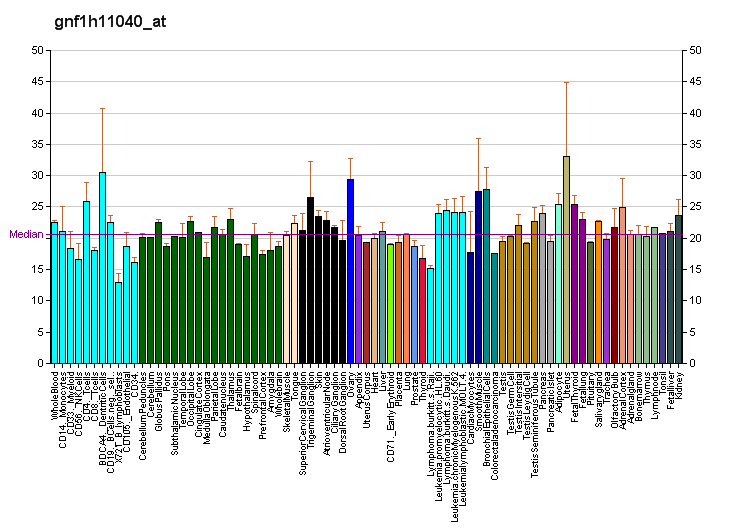

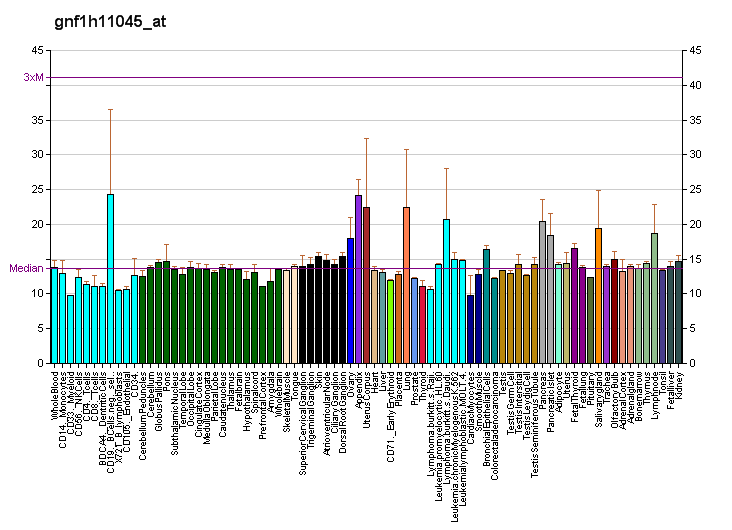
RNA expression pattern
Bgee	Human / Mouse (ortholog); Top expressed in: testicle; C1 segment; substantia nigra; gastrocnemius muscle; tibial nerve; hippocampus proper; hypothalamus; muscle of thigh; primary visual cortex; putamen / Top expressed in: embryo; uterus; More reference expression data
BioGPS	More reference expression data
Gene ontology
Molecular function	G protein-coupled receptor activity; olfactory receptor activity; signal transducer activity
Cellular component	integral component of membrane; plasma membrane; membrane
Biological process	sensory perception of smell; signal transduction; response to stimulus; detection of chemical stimulus involved in sensory perception of smell; G protein-coupled receptor signaling pathway
Sources:Amigo / QuickGO
Orthologs
Databases	NCBI: entry; OMA: entry
Species	Human	Mouse
Entrez	26248	258922
Ensembl	ENSG00000171133	ENSMUSG00000043385
UniProt	Q8NGT1	A2AM35
RefSeq (mRNA)	NM_205859	NM_146920
RefSeq (protein)	NP_995581	NP_667131
Location (UCSC)	Chr 9: 111.33 – 111.33 Mb	Chr 4: 58.78 – 58.79 Mb
PubMed search
- Wikidata
View/Edit Human	View/Edit Mouse

Olfactory receptor 2K2 is a protein that in humans is encoded by the OR2K2 gene.

Olfactory receptors interact with odorant molecules in the nose, to initiate a neuronal response that triggers the perception of a smell. The olfactory receptor proteins are members of a large family of G-protein-coupled receptors (GPCR) arising from single coding-exon genes. Olfactory receptors share a 7-transmembrane domain structure with many neurotransmitter and hormone receptors and are responsible for the recognition and G protein-mediated transduction of odorant signals. The olfactory receptor gene family is the largest in the genome. The nomenclature assigned to the olfactory receptor genes and proteins for this organism is independent of other organisms.

== See also ==
- Olfactory receptor
