= Quartz Hill, California =

- Unincorporated community Census-designated place
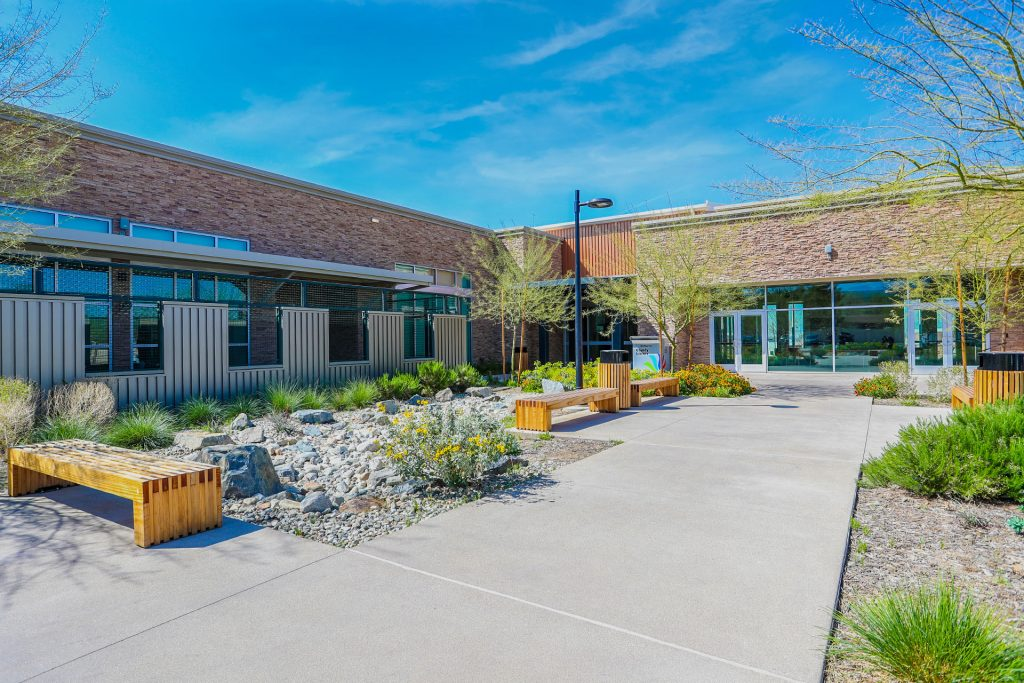
- Quartz Hill Library

- Location of Quartz Hill in Los Angeles County, California

- Location in the United States
- Coordinates: 34°39′8″N 118°13′14″W
- Country: United States
- State: California
- County: Los Angeles

Area
  - Total: 3.762 sq mi (9.744 km^{2})
  - Land: 3.762 sq mi (9.743 km^{2})
  - Water: 0.00039 sq mi (0.001 km^{2}) 0.01%
- Elevation: 2,497 ft (761 m)

Population (2020)
  - Total: 11,447
  - Density: 3,043/sq mi (1,175/km^{2})
- Time zone: UTC-8 (Pacific)
  - Summer (DST): UTC-7 (PDT)
- ZIP codes: 93536, 93551, 93586
- Area code: 661
- FIPS code: 06-59052
- GNIS feature IDs: 1661271, 2409114

Quartz Hill is an unincorporated community in Los Angeles County, California, United States. The name is also shared with the neighboring district areas of its border cities, Palmdale, and Lancaster. Quartz Hill was once home to the Quartz Hill Airport. For statistical purposes, the United States Census Bureau has defined Quartz Hill as a census-designated place (CDP). The population was 11,447 at the 2020 census, up from 10,912 at the 2010 census. According to the Greater Antelope Valley Economic Alliance report of 2009, the Palmdale / Lancaster urban area of which Quartz Hill is a part, has a population of 483,998.

== Geography ==
According to the United States Census Bureau, the CDP has a total area of 3.7 square miles (9.6 km^{2}), over 99% of which is land.

=== Climate ===
This region experiences hot and dry summers; average high temperatures during summer exceed 90 °F. According to the Köppen Climate Classification system, Quartz Hill has a warm-summer Mediterranean climate, abbreviated "Csb" on climate maps.

== Demographics ==
Historical population
Census	Pop.	Note	%±
1960	3,325		—
1970	4,935		48.4%
1980	7,421		50.4%
1990	9,626		29.7%
2000	9,890		2.7%
2010	10,912		10.3%
2020	11,447		4.9%
U.S. Decennial Census; 1860–1870 1880-1890; 1900 1910 1920; 1930 1940 1950; 1960 1970 1980; 1990 2000 2010; 2020

Quartz Hill first appeared as an unincorporated place in the 1960 U.S. census; and as a census designated place in the 1980 United States census.

=== Racial and ethnic composition ===
Quartz Hill CDP, California – Racial and ethnic composition Note: the US Census treats Hispanic/Latino as an ethnic category. This table excludes Latinos from the racial categories and assigns them to a separate category. Hispanics/Latinos may be of any race.
Race / Ethnicity (NH = Non-Hispanic)	Pop 2000	Pop 2010	Pop 2020	% 2000	% 2010	% 2020
White alone (NH)	7,337	6,798	5,637	74.19%	62.30%	49.24%
Black or African American alone (NH)	484	751	777	4.89%	6.88%	6.79%
Native American or Alaska Native alone (NH)	61	73	40	0.62%	0.67%	0.35%
Asian alone (NH)	180	288	312	1.82%	2.64%	2.73%
Native Hawaiian or Pacific Islander alone (NH)	22	24	17	0.22%	0.22%	0.15%
Other race alone (NH)	21	9	77	0.21%	0.08%	0.67%
Mixed race or Multiracial (NH)	274	280	599	2.77%	2.57%	5.23%
Hispanic or Latino (any race)	1,511	2,689	3,988	15.28%	24.64%	34.84%
Total	9,890	10,912	11,447	100.00%	100.00%	100.00%

=== 2020 census ===
As of the 2020 census, Quartz Hill had a population of 11,447 and a population density of 3,042.8 inhabitants per square mile (1,174.8/km^{2}). The Census reported that the whole population lived in households, and 100.0% of residents lived in urban areas while 0.0% lived in rural areas.

The racial makeup of Quartz Hill was 57.3% White, 7.2% African American, 1.6% Native American, 3.0% Asian, 0.2% Pacific Islander, 15.2% from other races, and 15.5% from two or more races.

The median age was 36.5 years. The age distribution was 24.5% under the age of 18, 9.0% aged 18 to 24, 26.7% aged 25 to 44, 25.3% aged 45 to 64, and 14.5% who were 65 years of age or older. For every 100 females, there were 97.1 males, and for every 100 females age 18 and over there were 95.6 males age 18 and over.

There were 3,941 households, out of which 33.5% included children under the age of 18, 48.5% were married-couple households, 6.6% were cohabiting couple households, 26.0% had a female householder with no spouse or partner present, and 19.0% had a male householder with no spouse or partner present. About 21.5% of households were one person, and 9.3% were one person aged 65 or older. The average household size was 2.9. There were 2,833 families (71.9% of all households).

There were 4,120 housing units at an average density of 1,095.2 units per square mile (422.9 units/km^{2}), of which 3,941 (95.7%) were occupied and 4.3% were vacant. Of occupied housing units, 67.8% were owner-occupied and 32.2% were occupied by renters. The homeowner vacancy rate was 1.5%; the rental vacancy rate was 3.4%.

=== Income and poverty ===
In 2023, the US Census Bureau estimated that the median household income was $104,017, and the per capita income was $43,194. About 8.1% of families and 10.9% of the population were below the poverty line.

=== 2010 census ===
The 2010 United States census reported that Quartz Hill had a population of 10,912. The population density was 2,900.1 inhabitants per square mile (1,119.7/km^{2}). The racial makeup of Quartz Hill was 8,218 (75.3%) White (62.3% Non-Hispanic White), 795 (7.3%) African American, 142 (1.3%) Native American, 303 (2.8%) Asian, 28 (0.3%) Pacific Islander, 947 (8.7%) from other races, and 479 (4.4%) from two or more races. Hispanic or Latino of any race were 2,689 persons (24.6%).

The Census reported that 10,892 people (99.8% of the population) lived in households, 20 (0.2%) lived in non-institutionalized group quarters, and 0 (0%) were institutionalized.

There were 3,712 households, out of which 1,521 (41.0%) had children under the age of 18 living in them, 1,972 (53.1%) were opposite-sex married couples living together, 573 (15.4%) had a female householder with no husband present, and 286 (7.7%) had a male householder with no wife present. There were 254 (6.8%) unmarried opposite-sex partnerships, and 22 (0.6%) same-sex married couples or partnerships. 692 households (18.6%) were made up of individuals, and 215 (5.8%) had someone living alone who was 65 years of age or older. The average household size was 2.93. There were 2,831 families (76.3% of all households); the average family size was 3.30.

The population was spread out, with 2,917 people (26.7%) under the age of 18, 1,143 people (10.5%) aged 18 to 24, 2,525 people (23.1%) aged 25 to 44, 3,220 people (29.5%) aged 45 to 64, and 1,107 people (10.1%) who were 65 years of age or older. The median age was 36.6 years. For every 100 females, there were 97.4 males. For every 100 females age 18 and over, there were 94.6 males.

There were 4,018 housing units at an average density of 1,067.9 per square mile (412.3/km^{2}), of which 2,584 (69.6%) were owner-occupied, and 1,128 (30.4%) were occupied by renters. The homeowner vacancy rate was 2.0%; the rental vacancy rate was 8.5%. 7,426 people (68.1% of the population) lived in owner-occupied housing units and 3,466 people (31.8%) lived in rental housing units.

According to the 2010 United States census, Quartz Hill had a median household income of $51,821, with 19.1% of the population living below the federal poverty line.

=== Mapping L.A. ===
According to Mapping L.A., German and Irish were the most common ancestries in 2000. Mexico and the Philippines were the most common foreign places of birth.

== Community characteristics ==
Quartz Hill is located in the High Desert of California north of the Los Angeles area. As recently as the 1970s the town was largely agricultural, with cash crops of almonds, alfalfa and turkeys. The almond orchards being crippled by disease and the alfalfa growers having to contend with their water rights being diverted (to a growing Los Angeles) caused a significant shift in the local work force. The shift mainly was toward the nearby aerospace plants of Lockheed Martin and Rockwell International. Despite currently containing fewer orchards and farms than in its agricultural heyday, Quartz Hill still celebrates the Almond Blossom Festival every year.

== Education ==
Most of Quartz Hill is served by the Westside Union Elementary School District, while a piece is served by the Lancaster Elementary School District. All of Quartz Hill is in the Antelope Valley Union Joint High School District.

Quartz Hill schools include High Desert Bible College, Quartz Hill Elementary School, Sundown Elementary School, Joe Walker Middle School (students in parts of Quartz Hill go to Del Sur Elementary School in Antelope Acres), and Quartz Hill High School, which is part of the Antelope Valley Union High School District.

== Government ==
In the California State Legislature, Quartz Hill is in the 23rd senatorial district, represented by Republican Suzette Martinez Valladares, and in the 34th Assembly district, represented by Republican Tom Lackey.

In the United States House of Representatives, Quartz Hill is in California's 27th congressional district, represented by Democrat George T. Whitesides.

The Los Angeles County Department of Health Services operates the Antelope Valley Health Center in Lancaster, serving Quartz Hill.
