= Austin Executive Airpark =

Austin Executive Airpark (closed)
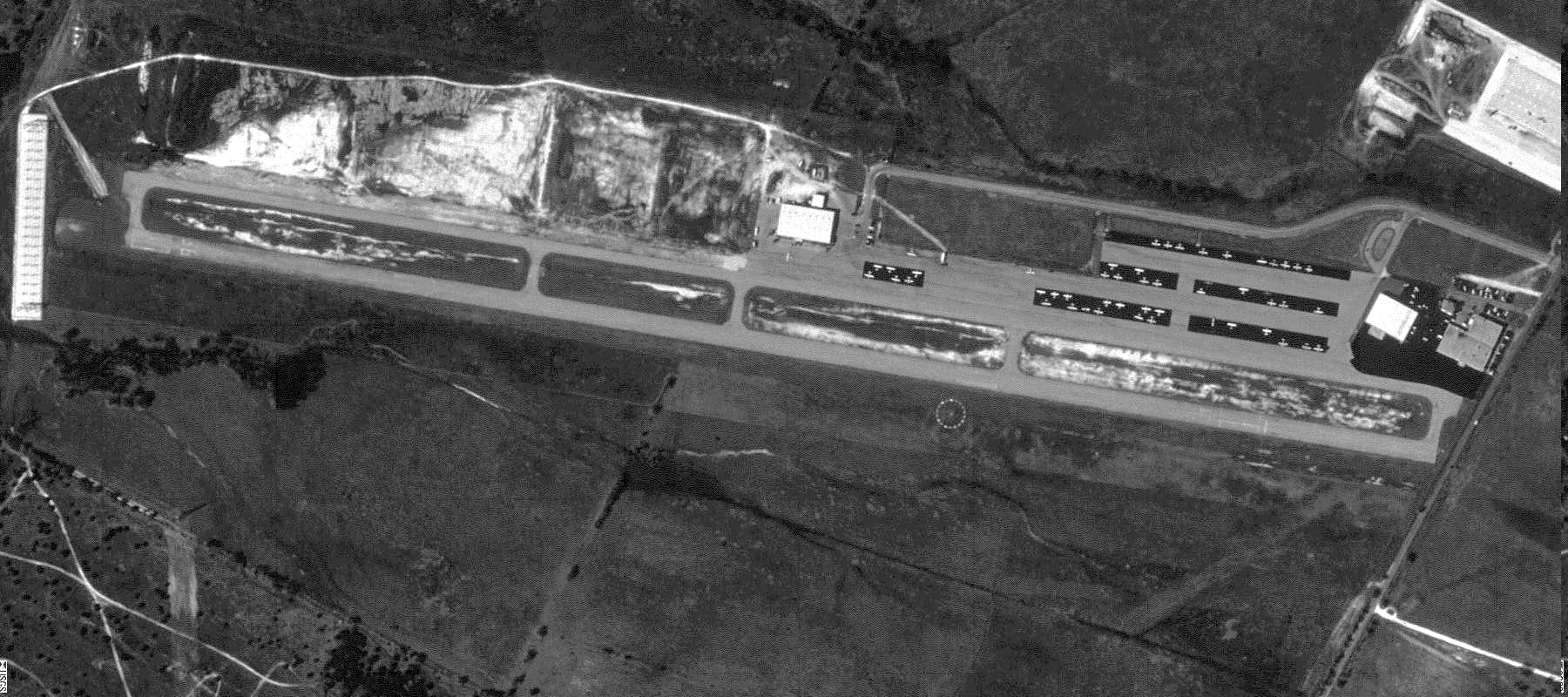
- USGS 1995 orthophoto (North is to the right)
- IATA: none; ICAO: none; FAA LID: 3R3

Summary
- Airport type: Public
- Location: Austin, Texas
- Elevation AMSL: 762 ft / 232 m
- Coordinates: 30°24′50″N 097°39′57″W
- Interactive map of Austin Executive Airpark (closed)

Runways
Direction	Length		Surface
Direction	ft	m	Surface
17/35	2,800	853	Asphalt

Austin Executive Airpark (FAA LID: 3R3), formerly known as Tim's Airpark (in the 1960s and 1970s), was a public-use airport located in Austin, Texas, United States. It was located near the intersection of Parmer Lane and Interstate 35.

The property was purchased by nearby Dell Computers with the intentions of using it to expand its warehouse facilities. The airport was permanently closed on May 1, 1999.

In 2011, another existing airport, Bird's Nest Airport (FAA LID: 6R4), located in nearby Manor, Texas, was expanded and renamed Austin Executive Airport.
