= Naval Air Station Livermore Outlying Fields =

1940s US Navy runways in California

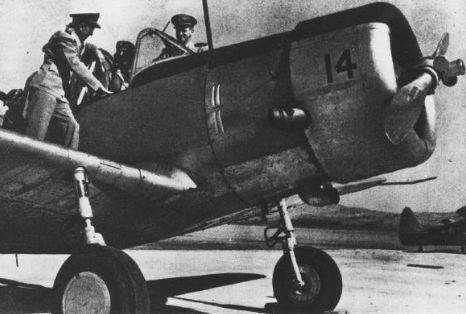
Naval Air Station Livermore in 1944 training pilot in a SNV, a Vultee BT-13 Valiant

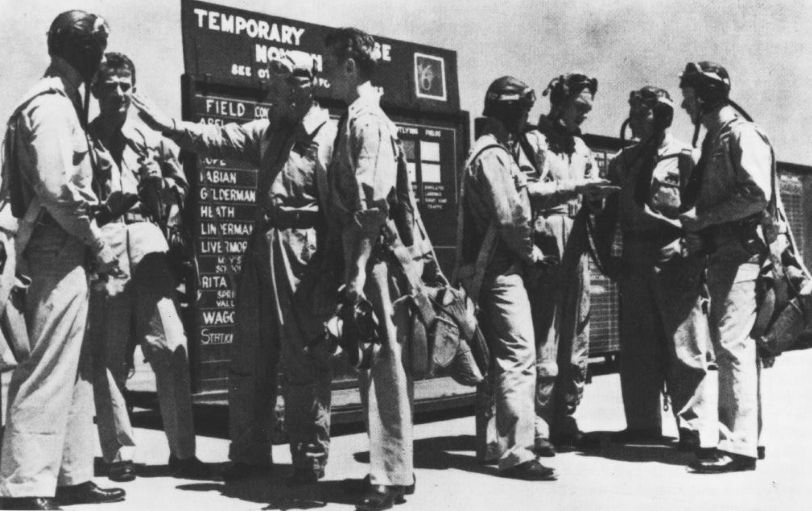
Cadets and instructors check the flight assignment board at Naval Air Station Livermore in 1944

Naval Air Station Livermore has nearby airfield landing strips to support the training of US Navy pilots during World War 2. The airfield are called Naval Outlying Landing Field (NOLFs). For the war many new trained pilots were needed. The Naval Outlying Landing Fields provided a place for pilots to practice landing and take off without other air traffic. The remotes sites offered flight training without distractions. Most of the new pilots departed to the Pacific War after training. The Outlying Landing Fields had little or no support facilities. Naval Air Station Livermore opened in 1942 and closed in 1951. The Outlying field closed in 1945, having completed the role of training over 4000 new pilots. To open the needed Outlying Landing Fields quickly, the Navy took over local crop dusting and barnstorming airfields.

The Naval Air Station Livermore Outlying Fields were:

== Abel NOLF ==
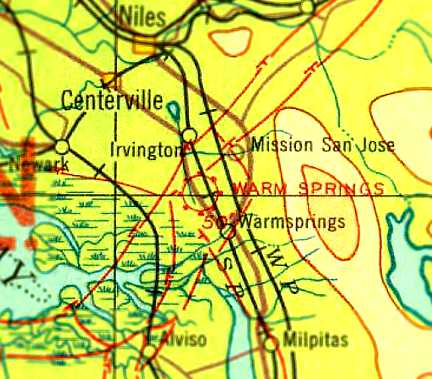
Warm Springs Airport on 1933 map, in 1942 Abel NOLF

Abel NOLF, Abel Naval Naval Auxiliary Landing Field, was a World War 2 training airstrip. The Navy took over the Warm Springs Airport built in 1933 and built a new runway nearby. The Airport became a satellite for Livermore NAS in 1943. The runway was located 1 mile north of the City of Milpitas, California at 37.456°N 121.906°W. The Navy ended the use of the runway in 1945. In 1946 Warm Springs Airport, also called Milpitas Airport and Warm Springs Gliderport, became a public airport for airplanes and gliders. The Airport offered training, charters, repairs and model airplane flying. The airport had a single unpaved north/south 3,800-foot runway. In the Spring of 1952 the airport closed and became a housing tract.

== Brown-Fabian NOLF ==
Brown-Fabian NOLF, Brown-Fabian Naval Outlying Landing Field was a World War 2 training airstrip used from 1943 to 1945. The Navy took over the Brown-Fabian Airport for training. Brown-Fabian NOLF was located 3.5 miles west of the city of Tracy, California at 37.780°N 121.560°W. The satellite airfield had a 6,300-foot sod runway. The site closed after the war and is now farmland.

== Cope Field NOLF ==
Cope Field NOLF, Cope Field Naval Outlying Landing Field was a satellite runway for Livermore NAS, it had a single 3200' sod runway. The Naval Outlying Landing Field was used from 1943 to 1945. The runway was located 2 miles northeast of the City of Pleasanton, California at 37.68°N 121.84°W. The site is now a gravel pit.

== Gelderman NOLF ==
Gelderman NOLF, Gelderman Naval Outlying Landing Field was a World War 2 training airstrip used from 1943 to 1945. The Navy took over the Gelderman Airport for training. Gelderman was located 4 miles north of Dublin, California at 37.75°N 121.95°W. The satellite airfield was a 2,200-foot sod runway. The site is now houses in San Ramon, California

== Heath NOLF ==
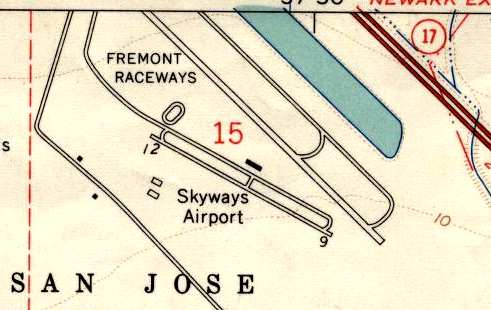
Heath NOLF, now Skyways Airport in 1961 USGS map

Heath NOLF, Heath Naval Outlying Landing Field was a World War 2 training airstrip used from 1943 to 1945. The Navy leased 160 acres from the Heath family in Fremont, California, south of the city center at 37.5°N 121.96°W. Heath NOLF had a northwest/southeast 3,100-foot concrete runway. In 1950 the runway became a civil airport, Skyways Airport, later in 1959 renamed Sky Sailing sailplane field, Sky Sailing Airport in 1959. The Sky Sailing Airport was a very active glider airport with a glider school, paid glider rides, and private gliders parked there. The Fremont Dragstrip also operated at the airport from 1959 until the end of 1988. The I-880 freeway was built on part of the old Heath NOLF in 1984. The airport closed in June of 1989 and is now commercial property.

== Lindeman NOLF ==
Lindeman NOLF, Lindeman Naval Outlying Landing Field was a World War 2 training airstrip used from 1943 to 1945. The Navy took over the Lindeman Airport for training. Lindeman NOLF was located 9 miles northwest of the city of Tracy, California at 37.08°N 121.57°W at a 2,000-foot elevation. The satellite airfield was a 3,900-foot sod runway, now houses.

== Livermore NOLF ==
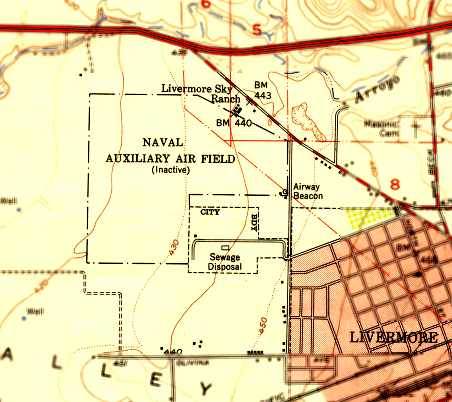
Livermore Sky Ranch on 1953 USGS map, Livermore Municipal Airport, Livermore NOLF in 1943

Livermore NOLF, Livermore Naval Outlying Landing Field was a World War 2 training airstrip used from 1943 to 1945. The Navy took over the Livermore Sky Ranch built in 1929 for training. Livermore Airport is located 2 miles northwest of the city of Livermore, California at 37°41′36.2″N 121°49′13.3″W. The satellite airfield was just North of Naval Air Station Livermore and has a 4,000-foot sod runway, now the `. In the 1930s, the Civil Aeronautics Administration (CAA) classified the Airport as a civil emergency airfield known as Livermore Intermediate Airport.

== May's School NOLF ==
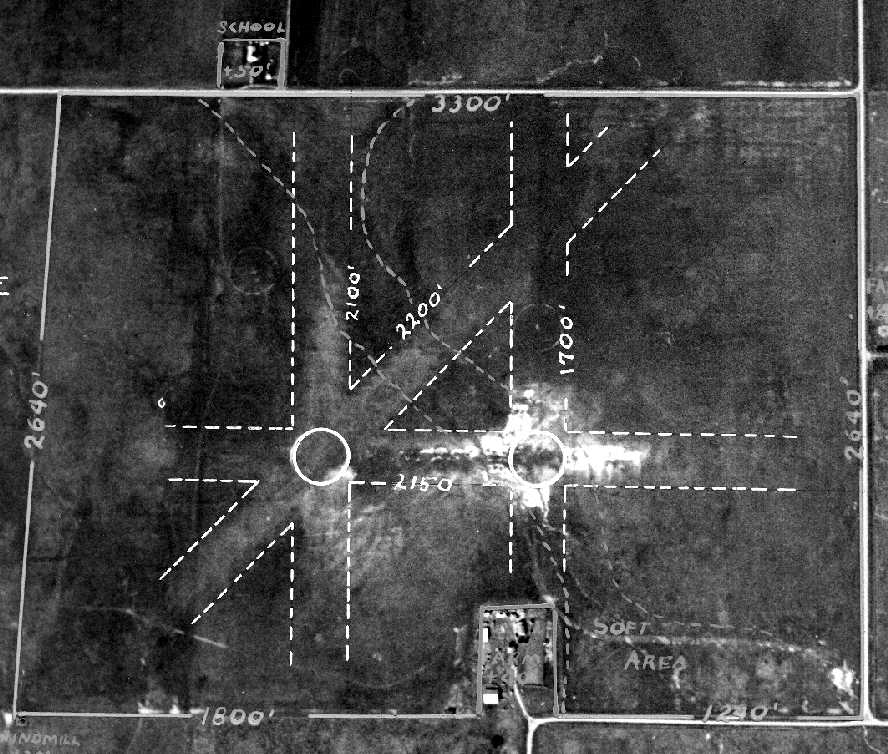
May's School Naval Outlying Landing Field in 1942

May's School NOLF, May's School Naval Outlying Landing Field, Mays auxiliary airfield was a World War 2 training airstrip used from 1943 to 1945 on 200 acres. The Navy built May's School Field for training pilots. May's School Field was located 4.5 miles northeast of the City of Livermore, California at 37.72750°N 121.753611°W, at May School Road & Dagningo Road. The satellite airfield was also called Silva Barthe Field, had four unpaved runways. In the 1990s the site became a Federal Communications Commission antenna farm, called the Livermore Monitoring Station, the site is now just outside the city.

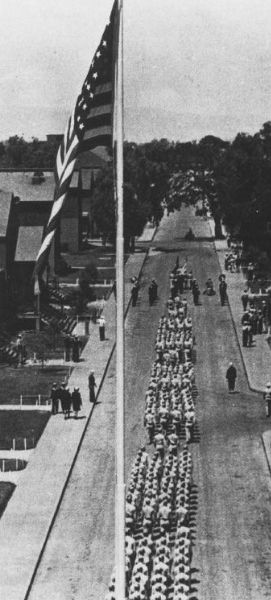
Air Cadets marching at Naval Air Station Livermore in 1944

== Rita Butterworth NOLF ==
Rita Butterworth NOLF, Rita Butterworth Naval Outlying Landing Field was a World War 2 training airstrip used from 1943 to 1945. The Navy took over the Rita Butterworth Airport for training. Rita Butterworth NOLF was located 3 miles northeast of the City of Pleasanton, California at 37.703124°N 121.855718°W. The satellite airfield had a 3,000-foot sod runway, now a vacant lot and commercial property in Dublin, California just north of the I-580 freeway and west of Fallon Road.

== Spring Valley NOLF ==
Spring Valley NOLF, Spring Valley Naval Outlying Landing Field was a World War 2 training airstrip used from 1943 to 1945. The Navy took over the Spring Valley Airport for training. Spring Valley NOLF was located 2.5 miles northwest of the City of Pleasanton, California at 37.66°N 121.79°W. The satellite airfield was a 3,500-foot sod runway, now houses.

== Wagoner NOLF ==
Wagoner NOLF, Wagoner Naval Outlying Landing Field was a World War 2 training airstrip used from 1943 to 1945. The Navy took over the Wagoner Airport for training. Wagoner Airport was located 1.5 miles southwest of City of Livermore, California at 37.690°N 121.79°W. The Wagoner Airport had a 3,000-foot sod runway, in 1943 the Navy built a 2,700-foot x 3,000-foot paved landing pad on the site. After the war the site was closed and turned over to the county, the site is now houses.

== See also ==
- California during World War II
- American Theater (1939–1945)
- United States home front during World War II
