= Giant beaver =

Giant beaver may refer to:

- Castoroides, an extinct Pleistocene genus of beavers from North America
- Trogontherium, an extinct Pleistocene genus of beavers from Eurasia
