= Naval Outlying Landing Field Magnolia =

Military airport in USA

NOLF Magnolia Field
- Baldwin County, Alabama in United States of America
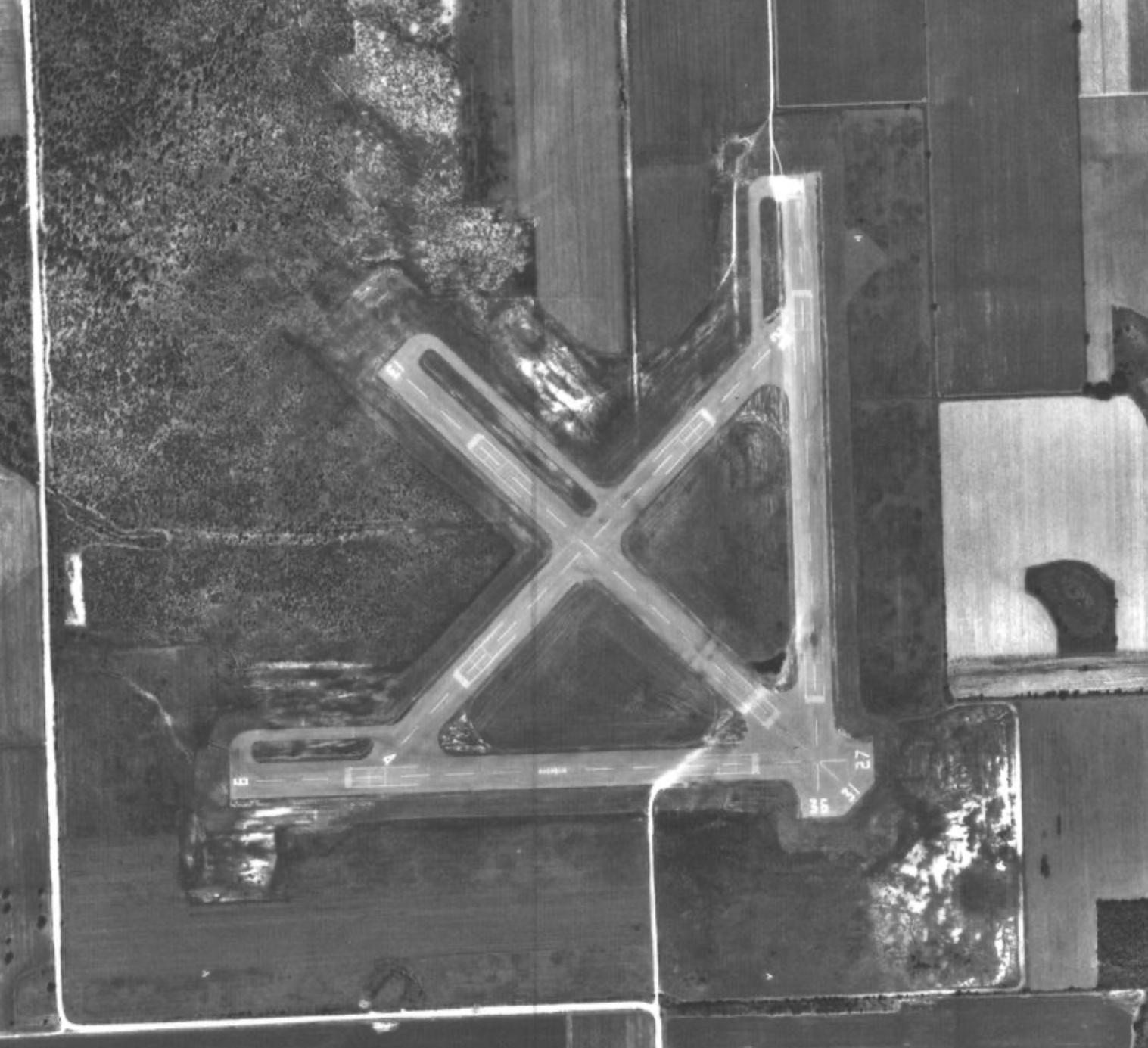
- Aerial photograph of NOLF Magnolia in 1966.

Site information
- Type: Naval Outlying Landing Field
- Owner: US Government
- Operator: United States Navy
- Condition: Demolished

Location
- Location in Alabama NOLF Magnolia (the United States)
- Coordinates: 30°26′52″N 87°46′03″W

Site history
- Built: 1943
- Built for: Navy flight training
- In use: 1943 - 1976

Airfield information
Runways
Direction	Length and surface
4/22	868 metres (2,848 ft) Asphalt
13/31	868 metres (2,848 ft) Asphalt
9/27	868 metres (2,848 ft) Asphalt
18/36	868 metres (2,848 ft) Asphalt

Naval Outlying Landing Field Magnolia, or Magnolia Field, was an unmanned military airport in Baldwin County, Alabama, United States. It was built between 1943-44 by the United States Navy, and operated as a satellite field to NAS Pensacola for most of its lifetime. It was closed around the mid-1970s when ownership was transferred to Baldwin County.

== History ==
NOLF Magnolia was built between 1943-44 by the United States Navy. It was a part of a larger system of Second World War-era satellite airfields operated by Naval Air Station (NAS) NAS Pensacola. The property was irregularly-shaped, having 3 bituminous runways measuring 2,850 feet long. The airfield was designated as NOLF 28431, and was referred to as Naval Outlying Field 28431. It was first depicted on the January 1944 Mobile Sectional Chart. NOLF Magnolia did not have any hangars and was owned by the US Government while being operated by the Navy. In 1950s, SNJ-5B Texans of NAAS Barin Field’s Basic Training Unit 3 used the airfield for training purposes. It was fitted with four asphalt runways, with the longest being 2,850 feet long. In 1964, it was used for Intensive Student Pilot Training.

In 1972, NOLF Magnolia began operating as a landfill after Baldwin County leased the property from the Navy. It was eventually brought from the federal government’s General Service Administration. Despite this, it was still depicted as an active airfield on the January 1976 New Orleans Sectional Chart. Between 1976-80, NOLF Magnolia was fully closed. In 1997, the four paved runways were demolished. By 2006, it has been used as a landfill for 20 years, with all runways and infrastructure being removed. Retention ponds were spread all over the property.

=== Present ===
Today, Magnolia Landfill is operated by the Baldwin County Commission. Remnants of the center runway remained, with portions of the eastern runway covered by years of soil build-up, making it obscured in the aerial photo. There is an auxiliary entrance that FEMA contractors use, which was one of the original entrances to the airfield.

A portion of the land at Magnolia Landfill was secured through a ground lease by RC club Bay Area Radio Control Society. It was named Magnolia Field and consists of a 45 x 300 ft Geotex runway, with permitted operations including jets, helicopters, fixed-wings, electric and giant scale.

== Incidents & accidents ==
On 27 October, 1952, an SNJ-6B aircraft assigned to Carrier Qualification Training Unit 4 at Barin Field was substantially damaged during landing at NOLF Magnolia. On 6 November, 1953, the pilot of a modified SNJ-6B aircraft from Basic Training Unit 3 at Barin Field lost control, prompting an emergency landing at NOLF Magnolia. This caused severe damage to the aircraft. On 10 December, 1953, an SNJ-6B aircraft from Basic Training Unit 3 at Barin Field was substantially damaged during a heavy landing at NOLF Magnolia. That same aircraft was involved in a previous mechanical failure while landing at Barin Field on 24 July, 1953. On 7 April, 1954, a modified SNJ-6B from Basic Training Unit 3 at Barin Field suffered an engine failure, prompting the pilot to make a forced landing at NOLF Magnolia. The aircraft was damaged. On 24 May, 1954, a modified SNJ-6B aircraft from Basic Training Unit 3 at Barin Field suffered engine failure and made a forced landing at NOLF Magnolia. This resulted in substantial damage. On 27 October, 1954, a modified SNJ-6B aircraft from Basic Training Unit 3 was substantially damage following a hard landing at NOLF Magnolia. On 16 June, 1955, a modified SNJ-6B aircraft armed with 20mm machine guns and bomb ranks from Basic Training Unit 3 suffered an accident during take-off from NOLF Magnolia. It was substantially damaged following the accident. On 22 June, 1955, a modified SNJ-6B aircraft that was armed with 20mm machine guns and bomb racks from Basic Training Unit 3 at Barin Field suffered engine failure. This prompt an emergency landing 2 miles west of NOLF Magnolia, causing substantial damage.
