= Nartron Field =

Airport in Michigan, US

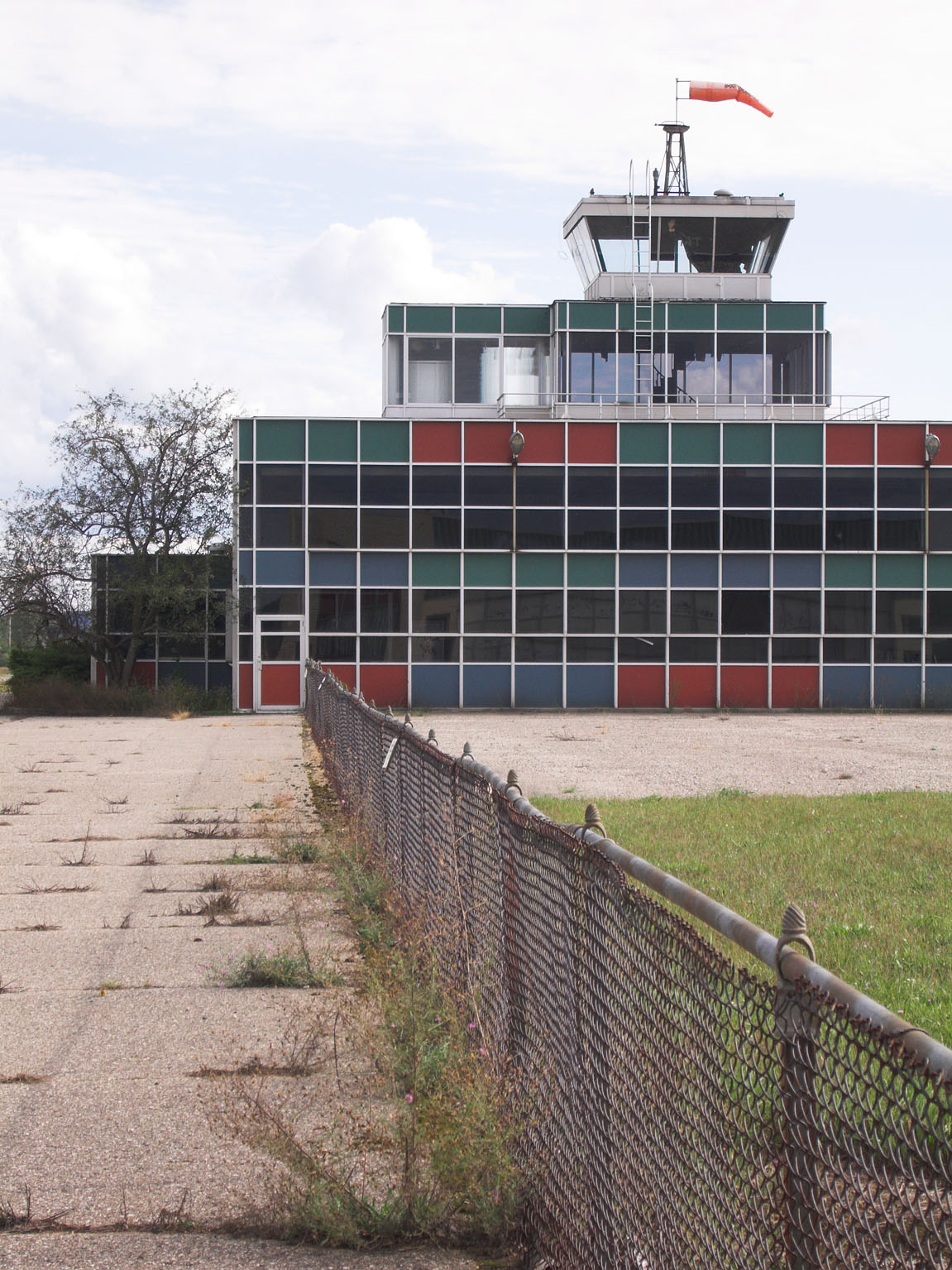
- IATA: RCT; ICAO: KRCT; FAA LID: RCT

Summary
- Airport type: Private
- Operator: Norman Rautiola
- Location: Reed City, Michigan
- Time zone: UTC−05:00 (-5)
  - Summer (DST): UTC−04:00 (-4)
- Elevation AMSL: 1,055 ft (322 m)
- Coordinates: 43°54′00″N 85°31′00″W
- Interactive map of Nartron Field

Runways
Direction	Length		Surface
Direction	ft	m	Surface
17/35	4,506	1,373	Asphalt

Statistics (2020)
- Annual Aircraft Operations: 5
- Based Aircraft: 0

Nartron Field (IATA: RCT, ICAO: KRCT, FAA LID: RCT) is an airport located 2 miles (3.2 km) north of Reed City, Michigan, US.

== History ==
In 1954, local manufacturer Miller Industries built a small airstrip and hangar north of Reed City. It was intended for private use to serve the company's traffic. Two years later, expansion of U.S. Highway 131 required the airstrip to be moved. Miller decided to rebuild it in a grand fashion, with buildings that showcased the aluminum and glass storefronts it sold. The new Miller Field included a 4,506-ft main runway, a terminal with a 1200-person auditorium and a control tower, a separate hangar building, and hydro-electric power generation.

The airport was used to fly Miller Industry's customers to visit the company. The passenger terminal includes a 1,200-seat auditorium to host company and social events.

In 1960, North Central Airlines began providing scheduled passenger service to the field as part of a route from Chicago (O'Hare) to Traverse City. North Central stopped serving Reed City in 1966, prompting Miller Industries to begin its own air service. Miller Airlines provided service on a route from Chicago (Meigs) to Cadillac, and in 1969 added service to Ludington and Detroit City Airport. This service lasted until 1971, when use of the airport began to decline. Miller Industries attempted to sell the field to Reed City for $1, but the city was not interested in maintaining the airport.

In 1979, the facility was purchased by Norman Rautiola, owner of Nartron Corporation. Nartron makes electronics for the automotive industry, and used the airport buildings for its engineering and manufacturing operations, including advanced product development and wire products assembly. These activities were moved to another location in the late 1980s, and the airport ceased operations.

On December 11th in 2024, firefighters were dispatched to Nartron Field for a reported fire around 12:30 am. The firefighters were able to quickly contain the fire to two offices, according to a news release from the Reed City Fire Department. Trespassers frequent this location, which is often erroneously described as abandoned and open to the public online. The property is private and people are not allowed to trespass in the building.

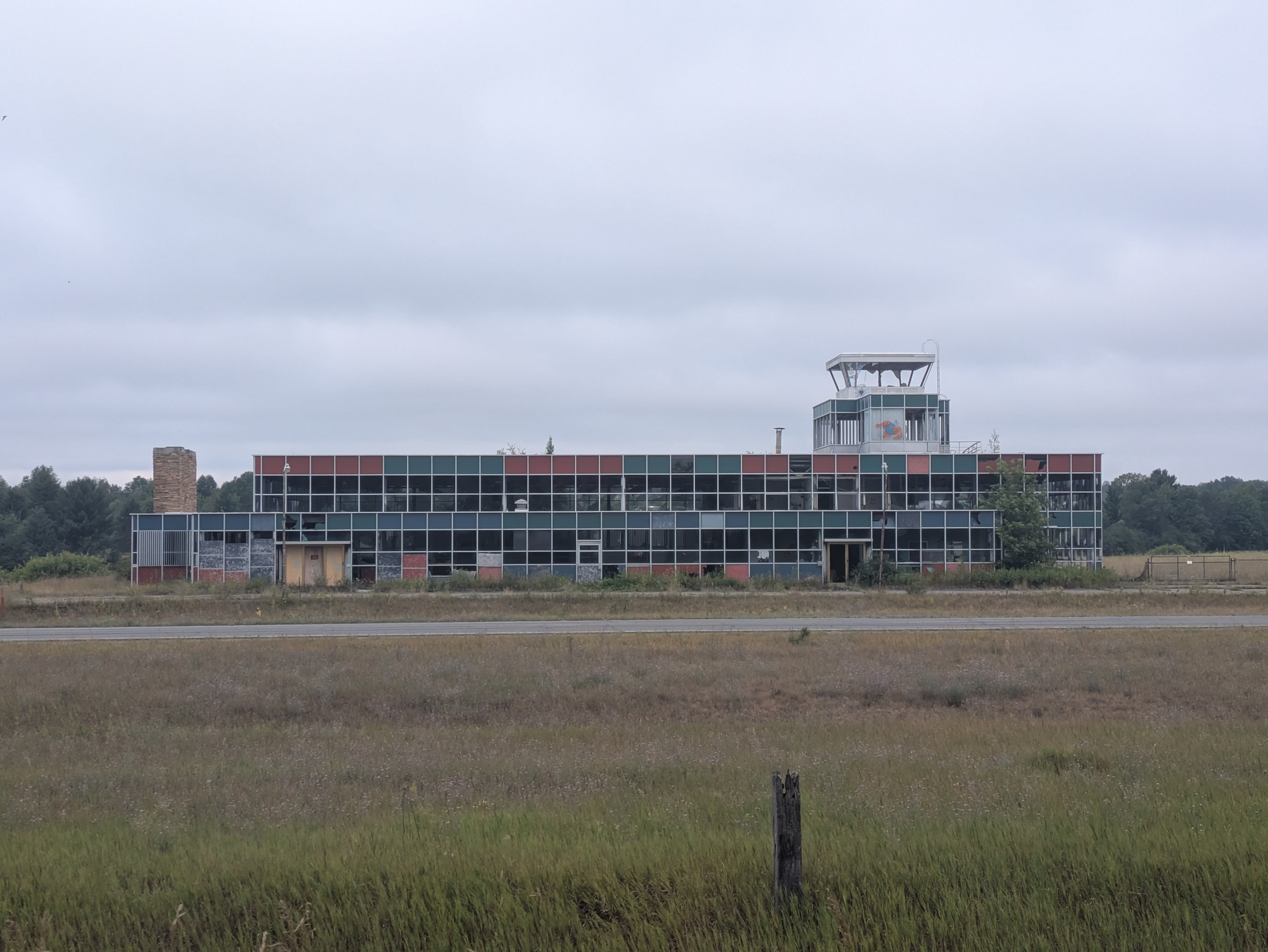
Terminal building at Natron Field in 2026 showing vandalism

== Facilities ==
The terminal building, including a defunct control tower, sits on the southeast corner of the airport. It is locked and has nothing to offer to visiting aircraft.

The airport has one runway, designated as runway 17/35. It measures 4506 x 100 ft (1373 x 30 m) and is asphalt. For the 12-month period ending December 31, 2020, the airport averages 5 aircraft operations per year, all general aviation.

An area east of runway 17/35 and north of the building is used by local RC model aircraft enthusiasts to fly model aircraft.

=== Runways ===
The only runway, 17/35, is in poor condition, and the surface is cracked and scattered with stones. Vegetation grows through cracks.

A runway intersects runway 17/35. Its direction is approximately 8/26, and it was about 2500 ft long. Part of it is now covered by an industrial storage lot.

=== Transit ===
The airport is accessible by road from Old US Highway 131, just north of the intersection with US 10. The airport is also adjacent to the US 131 freeway, accessible from US 10.

== See also ==
- List of airports in Michigan
