= David's Airport =

David's Airport David's Field
- IATA: none; ICAO: none; FAA LID: 9C2

Summary
- Airport type: Public
- Owner: Mike Abu-Rezeq
- Serves: Athens, Michigan
- Elevation AMSL: 887 ft (270 m)
- Coordinates: 42°03′55″N 085°14′30″W
- Interactive map of David's Airport

Runways
Direction	Length		Surface
Direction	ft	m	Surface
9/27	2,500	762	Turf

Statistics (2005)
- Aircraft operations: 1,000
- Source: Federal Aviation Administration

David's Airport (FAA LID: 9C2), also known as David's Field, is a privately owned, public-use airport located in Branch County, Michigan, United States. It is two miles (3 km) south of the central business district of Athens, a village in Calhoun County. David's Field was built shortly after World War II by John Broberg and named to honor his twin brother, who was killed on Okinawa. John operated the field intermittently into the 1970s where he conducted flight training and parachute practice operations.

== Facilities and aircraft ==
David's Airport covers an area of 9 acres (3.6 ha) and has one runway designated as runway 9/27. The runway measures 2,500 x 100 ft (762 x 30 m) and has turf surface.

For the 12-month period ending December 31, 2005, the airport had 1,000 general aviation aircraft operations, an average of 83 per month.

== See also ==
- List of airports in Michigan
