= Delamar Landing Field =

Caliente Flight Strip Airport (Delamar Landing Field)
- IATA: none; ICAO: none; FAA LID: 0L2

Summary
- Elevation AMSL: 4,852 ft / 1,479 m
- Coordinates: 37.6005182°N 114.8550077°W
- Interactive map of Caliente Flight Strip Airport (Delamar Landing Field)

Runways
Direction	Length		Surface
Direction	ft	m	Surface
			unpaved dry lakebed

Helipads
Number	Length		Surface
Number	ft	m	Surface
		2,446

Caliente Flight Strip Airport was an airport near U.S. Route 93 in Nevada.
