= Quartz Hill Airport =

- IATA: none; ICAO: none

Summary
- Operator: Antelope Valley Aeronautical
- Location: Quartz Hill, California
- In use: 1946–1986
- Coordinates: 34°39′03″N 118°12′20″W
- Interactive map of Quartz Hill Airport

Runways
Direction	Length		Surface
Direction	ft	m	Surface
5/23	2,550	777	Dirt
9/27	2,300	701	Dirt

Quartz Hill Airport was an airport in Quartz Hill, California. It was closed in 1986 because of housing developments.

== History ==
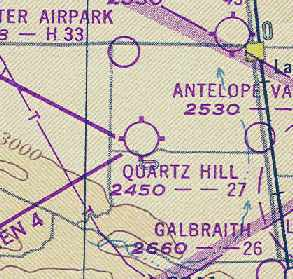
A 1947 sectional chart showing Quartz Hill Airport.

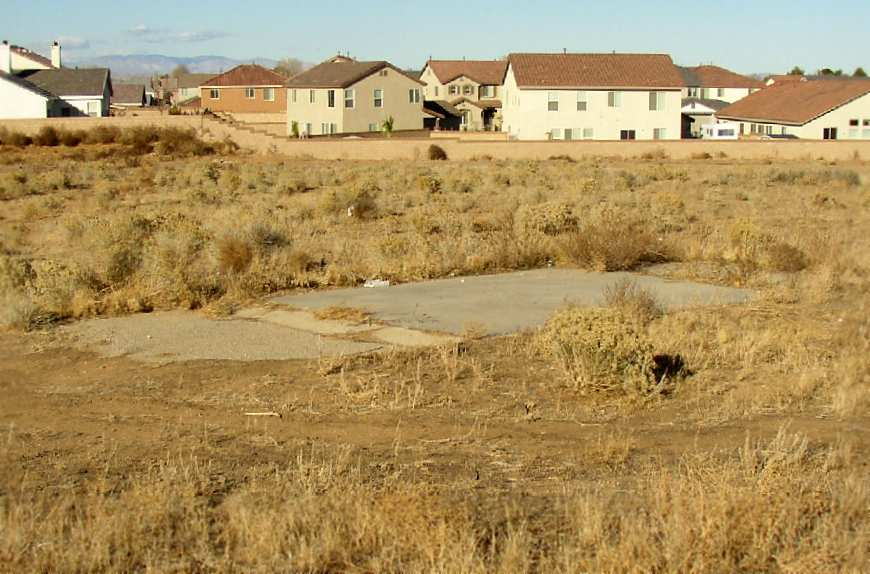
Remains of the Quartz Hill Airport (2003).

This general aviation airport opened in 1946. However, it was not depicted on the February 1947 Los Angeles Sectional Chart. The earliest depiction of Quartz Hill Airport was on the February 1949 LA Sectional Chart. It showed the field as having a 2,700-foot (823 m) unpaved runway.

The 1962 AOPA Airport Directory described Quartz Hill Airport as having two gravel runways: 2,640-foot (805 m) Runway 4/22 and 2,190-foot (668 m) Runway 13/31. It listed the operator as Antelope Valley Aeronautical.

The last photo of Quartz Hill Airport is a 1974 aerial view. It showed a total of 20 single-engine aircraft parked near a Quonset hut on the west side of the field.

By 1982, the status of Quartz Hill had changed to a private field. The airport was described as having two dirt runways: 2,550-foot (777 m) Runway 5/23 and 2,300-foot (701 m) Runway 9/27. It listed the operator as Antelope Valley Aeronautical.

In 1986 the airport was closed due to housing developers wanting the airport land to build homes.
