= Naval Air Station Los Alamitos Naval Outlying Landing Fields =

1940s US Navy runways in California

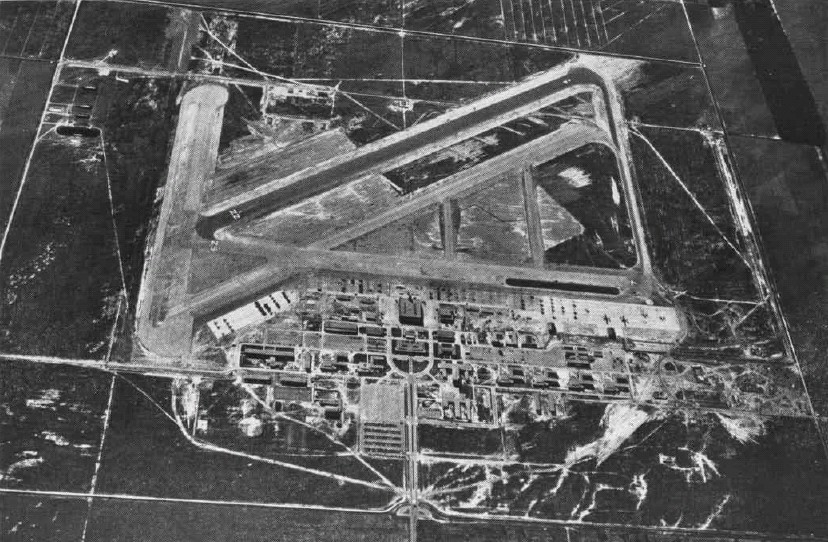
NAS Los Alamitos in the mid-1940s

Naval Air Station Los Alamitos Naval Outlying Landing Fields were a set airfield near Naval Air Station Los Alamitos to support the training of US Navy pilots during World War 2. The support airfields are called Naval Outlying Landing Field (NOLF). For the war, many new trained pilots were needed. The Naval Outlying Landing Fields provided a place for pilots to practice landing and take off without other air traffic. The remotes sites offered flight training without distractions. Most of the new pilots departed to the Pacific War after training. The Outlying Landing Fields had little or no support facilities. Naval Air Station Los Alamitos opened in 1942 and was transferred to the US Army in 1977 as Los Alamitos Army Airfield. Most of the Outlying fields closed in 1945, having completed the role of training new pilots. To open the needed Outlying Landing Fields quickly, the Navy took over local crop dusting and barnstorming airfields. Naval Air Station Los Alamitos was also called Los Alamitos Naval Reserve Air Base. During the war Marine Corps Air Station El Toro also used the outlying Landing Field. The Timm N2T Tutor was the most common plane used for training on the outlying landing fields.

The Naval Air Station Los Alamitos Outlying Fields were:

== Anaheim NOLF ==
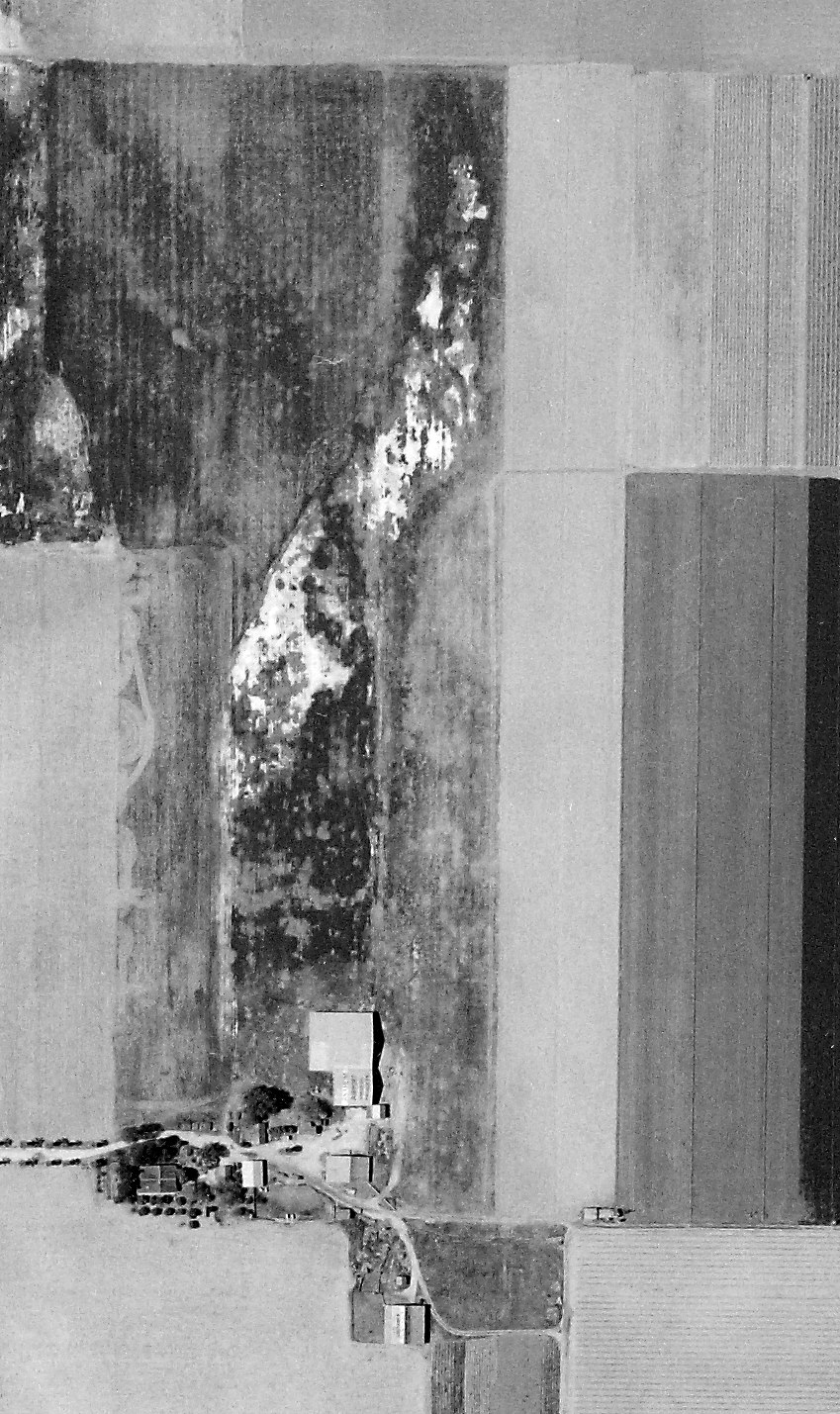
Luebkeman Airport - Naval Outlying Landing Field Anaheim in 1942

Naval Outlying Landing Field Anaheim started as Luebkeman Airport, then Anaheim Airport as an airport in Buena Park, California in the 1930 and 1940s at 33.84°N 118.02°W. Luebkeman Airport was built by Mr. Sam Coughran and the Luebkeman family. The Airport opened in 1937 on 240-acre of land. Anton Luebkeman & his wife had immigrated from Germany to California in 1904. In 1910 they purchased 104 acres in Buena Park and later 100 more acres. They built hangars and rented them for Barnstorming, cropdusting and the wealthy, like Howard Hughes. The first runway was a sod 2,200-foot running east/west. In 1939 the Airport started training to operate as a Civilian Pilot Training Program. In 1940 the movie The Great American Broadcast was filmed at the airport by 20th Century Studios, starring Alice Faye.

With the start of World War 2 the US Navy leased the airport for training pilots out of the Los Alamitos Naval Reserve Air Base, 5 miles southwest. After the war, the Luebkeman family did not reopen the airport. The hangars were used as barns on the farm. The site is now houses just west of Knott's Berry Farm, near San Gabriel Circle & San Simeon Circle.

== Palisades NOLF ==
Naval Outlying Field Palisades had a single 2,500-foot east–west runway located in the city of Newport Beach, California at 33.641111°N 117.880833°W built by the navy. There was just the runway with no facilities. The site is now Eastbluff Elementary School and houses.

== Mile Square Farm NOLF ==
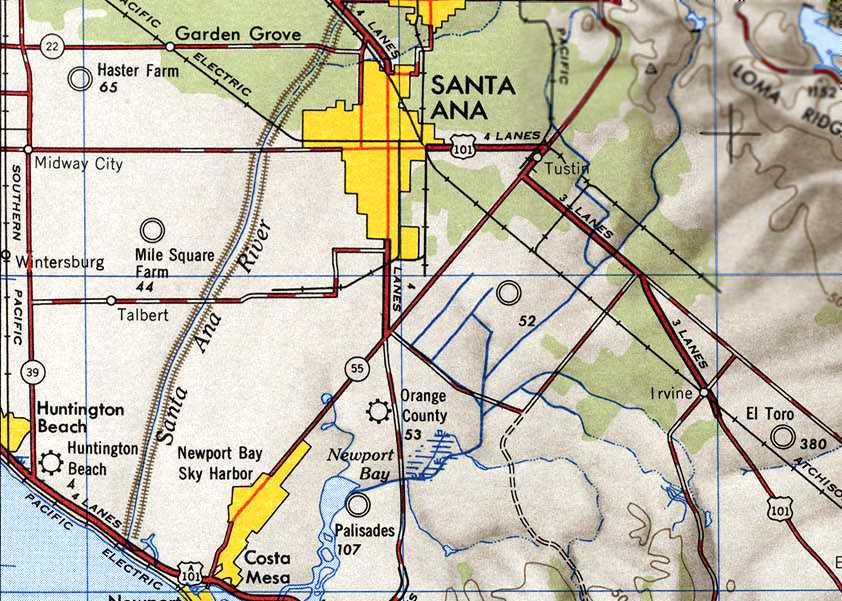
USGS map from 1947 with Mile Square Farm, Haster Farm, and Palisades NOLF

Mile Square Farm Naval Outlying Field opened in 1942 on 640 acres in the City of Fountain Valley, California at 33.73°N 117.94°W. For the site, 21 parcels of farmland were purchased by the Navy. Built at the site were three asphalt runways in a triangular layout, each about 2,500-feet long. The land was close to a square mile, that is 631 acres of land, thus the name. Mile Square Farm, unlike other Naval Outlying Fields, was not closed after the war, in 1955 the airfield was transferred to the US Marines. The facility was renamed Marine Corps Outlying Field Mile Square (MCOLF). The site was assigned to Marine Corp Air Facility, Santa Ana, later renamed Marine Corps Air Station Tustin. The Marines used the airport for helicopter autorotation practice. With no airplanes training crews, the Outlying Field had more land than needed. So, in 1970, Mile Square Regional Park was built on released land. In 1972 the Marines closed the airfield. In 1973 a ball diamonds & a children's play area was added on former Outlying Field land. In 1973, the complete site was removed from Navy assets. In 1976, the runways were opened for public recreation and used for land sailing and radio-controlled model aircraft, also built were picnic facilities and bicycle trails. In 1987, the remaining open land was turned into an 18-hole golf course, driving range, golf clubhouse. The north runway was removed to make room for the golf course. By 2004 all three runways were gone.

== Haster Farm NOLF ==
Haster Farm Naval Outlying Landing Field had a 1,500-foot diameter asphalt hexagonal landing mat built by the Navy. Haster Farm Naval Outlying Landing Field was located in the City of Garden Grove, California at 33.763°N 117.965°W. The site was closed after the war. The sites is now Bolsa Grande High School and Garden Grove Park.

== Horse Farm NOLF ==
Horse Farm Naval Outlying Landing Field had a 1,500-foot diameter paved hexagonal landing mat built by the Navy, in Garden Grove, California at 33.794°N 118.006°W on 288 acres of land. Part of the site is now a US Army & Army Reserve center Garden Grove and the rest is commercial real estate.

== Seal Beach NOLF ==
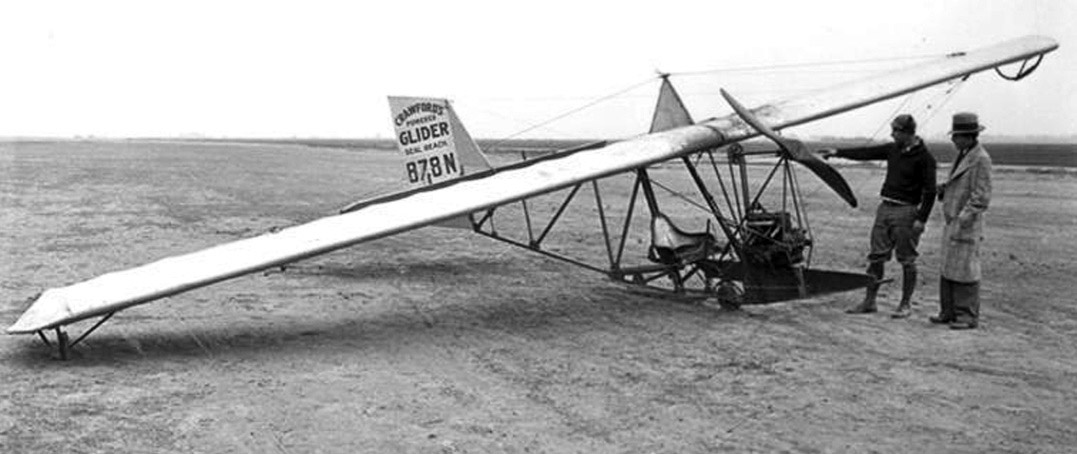
Mr. Crawford at Crawford Airport in 1925

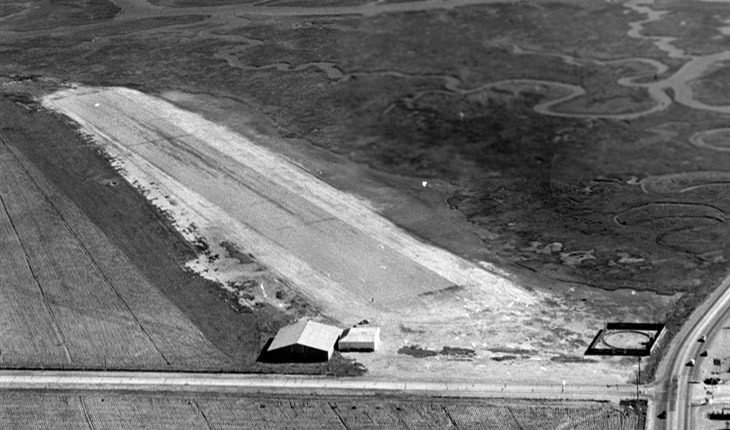
Crawford Airport in 1925

Seal Beach Naval Outlying Landing Field started as Crawford Airport in 1917, built by L.R. Crawford, in the City of Seal Beach, California at 33.742768°N 118.090791°W, just south of Westminster Boulevard and a little east of Route 1 - Coast Highway. Crawford Airport became well known for its stunt exhibitions performed over the Seal Beach Joy Zone from 1916 to 1919. The airport was used for private pilots, flying lessons, paid riders, repairs and police beach patrol planes. C.O. Prest set an unofficial altitude record in August 1917 and did mock air battles from Crawford Airport. Barnstorming pilots, like Earl S. Daugherty used the airfield from 1919 to 1920. L.R. Crawford started the Crawford Motor & Airplane Manufactory in 1927 at the airport. William Crawford designed the planes and gliders for the company. Their lightweight motors were also used in motorcycles. Crawford opened Southern California's first air speed course, which was also the nation's second course. The air speed course ran along Coast Highway for three kilometers and a flag on checkered pylons were at each end of the straight speedway. The Crawford Airport had a single unpaved dirt east–west runway. In 1932 Crawford sold the airport to Wes Carroll & Clyde Schlieper and it was renamed Seal Beach Airport. Seal Beach Airport became a private charter airport that also had flying lessons. In 1939 Wes Carroll & Clyde Schlieper set a Flight endurance record flying a Piper Cub seaplane, Spirit of Kay for 30 hours and 6 minutes. In 1940 the airport added municipal airport services.

In 1942 Seal Beach Airport was purchased by the US Navy and used as a Naval Outlying Air Field (21104) to support training naval pilots stationed at Alamitos & El Toro. In 1945, after the war, the Navy closed the runway and build buildings on the site to support Naval Weapons Station Seal Beach. Also at the site now, is the Lincoln Military Housing Seal Beach.

== See also ==
- California during World War II
- American Theater (1939–1945)
- List of airports in Colorado
- United States home front during World War II
