= Bean Blossom Airport =

- IATA: none; ICAO: none; FAA LID: 6B3

Summary
- Airport type: Public use
- Owner: Neil H. Campbell
- Serves: New Lothrop, Michigan
- Elevation AMSL: 740 ft (230 m)
- Coordinates: 43°02′26″N 084°00′18″W
- Interactive map of Bean Blossom Airport

Runways
Direction	Length		Surface
Direction	ft	m	Surface
3/21	1,900	579	Turf

Statistics (2004)
- Aircraft operations: 100
- Sources: FAA Michigan Airport Directory

Bean Blossom Airport (FAA LID: 6B3) was a privately owned public-use airport five nautical miles (9.3 km) southwest of the central business district of New Lothrop, in Shiawassee County, Michigan.

== Facilities and aircraft ==
Bean Blossom Airport covers an area of 140 acres (57 ha) at an elevation of 740 feet (230 m) above mean sea level. It has one runway designated 3/21 with a turf surface measuring 1,900 by 80 feet (579 m × 24 m). For the year ending December 31, 2004, the airport had 100 general aviation aircraft operations.
