= Twin Pine Airport =

Twin Pine Airport (closed)
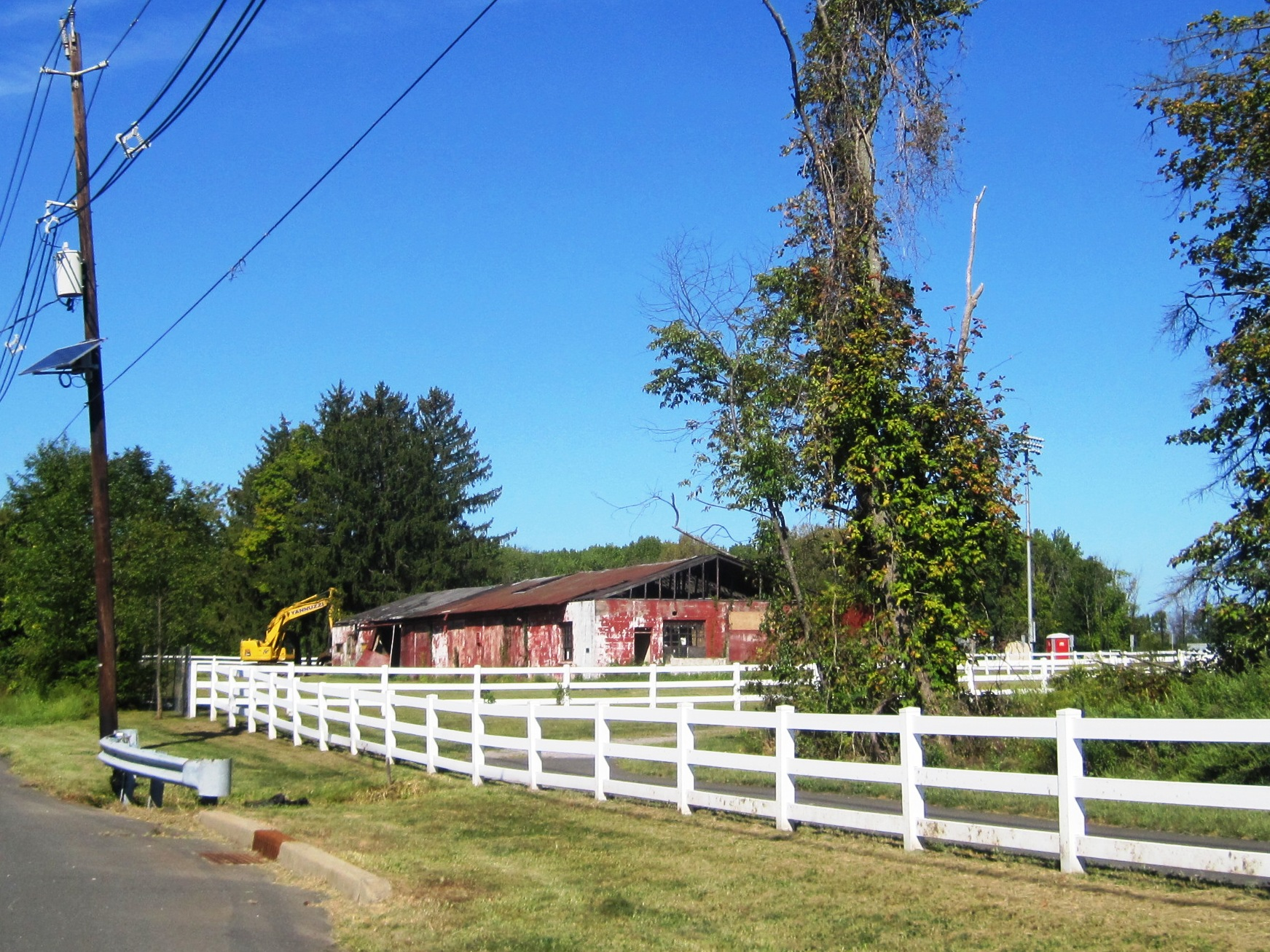
- Last hangar of the airport being demolished in September 2015
- IATA: none; ICAO: none; FAA LID: N75

Summary
- Airport type: Public-use
- Owner: William E. Weasner
- Serves: Pennington, New Jersey
- Location: Hopewell Township, New Jersey
- Elevation AMSL: 230 ft / 70 m
- Coordinates: 40°18′35″N 074°45′35″W

Map
- Interactive map of Twin Pine Airport (closed)

Runways
| Direction | Length | | Surface |
| Direction | ft | m | Surface |
|---|---|---|---|
| 12/30 | 2,200 | 671 | Turf |

Statistics (2006)
- Aircraft operations: 12,000
- Based aircraft: 15
- Source: Federal Aviation Administration

Twin Pine Airport (FAA LID: N75), originally called the Pennington Airport, was a privately owned public-use airport located on Pennington-Lawrenceville Road three miles (4.8 km) southeast of the central business district of Pennington, in Hopewell Township, Mercer County, New Jersey, United States. The airport was established in 1945 and is an example of a municipal government's desire to appropriate property for its own use using taxation methods as an alternative to eminent domain.

== Facilities and aircraft ==
Twin Pine Airport covered an area of 52 acres (21 ha) and contained one runway designated 12/30 with a 2,200 x 100 ft (671 x 30 m) turf surface. For the 12-month period ending December 31, 2006, the airport had 12,000 general aviation aircraft operations, an average of 32 per day. At that time there were 15 aircraft based at this airport: 73% single-engine, 7% multi-engine and 20% ultralight.

The airport had a single grass runway and was considered historic. It was home to many aircraft in its years, such as the famed Boeing 450 Stearman, nicknamed the "Red Baron", which regularly gave rides in and out of the airstrip. Charles Lindbergh frequented the airport during the time he lived at Highfields. In more recent years, some aircraft were left at the airport after its closure. These include a Cessna 150, a Varga Kachina, a Citabria, a Mooney M20C, and a Cessna 310.

== Municipal taking ==
Twin Pine Airport had been owned by William Weasner since 1956. The property was valued at $500,000 in 2005, but after the county ordered revaluations it was assessed at nearly $2,000,000. This caused a property tax increase from $17,000 to more than $36,000 per year, increasing the airport's business expenses by over 200%. In 2006, the towns of Hopewell Township, Lawrence Township, Hopewell, and Pennington applied for $2 million in grants from Mercer County to purchase the airport and turn it into athletic fields.

The airport's official closing ceremony was held on April 6, 2008. EAA Chapter 176 was based at Twin Pine and is planning a fly-by celebration for the airfield. After the last aircraft left, artificial turf soccer fields called the Twin Pines Athletic Complex were constructed funded by the towns that purchased the property. A museum detailing the airport's history was also expected to be constructed. The last remaining hangar at the airport was demolished in September 2015.

As of 2015, the owners alleged they had not received the total funds from the municipalities.
