= Big Beaver Airport =

- IATA: ~~3BB~~; ICAO: none

Summary
- Airport type: Private
- Location: Troy, Michigan
- Coordinates: 42°33′53.08″N 83°6′29.77″W

Map
- Location within Michigan

The Big Beaver Airport, formerly (IATA: ~~3BB~~), was a small suburban general aviation airport located at the corners of Big Beaver Road and John R Road in Troy, Michigan.

It was created in 1946 as an auxiliary airfield with a 2,400 ft (220 m²) gravel runway. By the 1970s, the main airstrip was converted to asphalt and a 2,100 ft (200 m²) sod runway was added. Flight training was done in Aeronca 7AC and Cessna 150/152 aircraft. Rentals later included a Piper PA-23, Cessna 172 Skyhawks and a Cessna 172RG Cutlass. The airfield closed in 1997. Originally the John Main family farm, it was owned and operated by his surviving daughter, Miss Anna Main, until her death. As she was never married and had no children, the city of Troy reached an agreement to let her operate the field until she died, at which time the city would acquire the property.

The airfield has since been developed into various office buildings and small industrial centers.
