= Air Park South =

- IATA: none; ICAO: none; FAA LID: 2K2

Summary
- Airport type: Public
- Owner: City of Springfield
- Serves: Springfield, Missouri
- Location: Ozark, Missouri
- Elevation AMSL: 1,336 ft / 407 m
- Coordinates: 37°03′34″N 093°14′03″W

Map
- Location of airport in Missouri

Runways
Direction	Length		Surface
Direction	ft	m	Surface
17/35	2,528	771	Asphalt

Statistics (2005)
- Aircraft operations: 2,260
- Based aircraft: 5
- Source: Federal Aviation Administration

Air Park South (FAA LID: 2K2) was a public use airport in Christian County, Missouri, United States. It was located three nautical miles (6 km) northwest of the central business district of Ozark, Missouri, and 8 nautical miles (15 km; 9 mi) south of Springfield, Missouri. It was owned by the City of Springfield.

In 2001, using federal and state grants, the Springfield-Branson National Airport Board purchased the airport from the City of Ozark, with the intention to use it for general aviation. In 2009, the City of Springfield authorized the airport board to sell the airport, due to the inability to purchase additional land to extend the runway.

The airport was listed in FAA records through 2011, but it had been noted as closed indefinitely since 2006.

== Facilities and aircraft ==
Air Park South covered an area of 130 acres (53 ha) at an elevation of 1,336 feet (407 m) above mean sea level. It had one runway designated 17/35 with an asphalt surface measuring 2,528 by 39 feet (771 x 12 m).

For the 12-month period ending November 30, 2005, the airport had 2,260 general aviation aircraft operations, an average of 43 per week. At that time there were five aircraft based at this airport, all single-engine.

== See also ==
- Springfield-Branson National Airport
