= Madison Municipal Airport =

Madison Municipal Airport may refer to:

- Madison Municipal Airport (Georgia) in Madison, Georgia, United States (FAA: 52A)
- Madison Municipal Airport (Indiana) in Madison, Indiana, United States (FAA:IMS)
- Madison Municipal Airport (South Dakota) in Madison, South Dakota, United States (FAA: MDS)

== See also ==
- Madison Airport (disambiguation)
- Madison County Airport (disambiguation)
