= List of airports in South Dakota =

This is a list of airports in South Dakota (a U.S. state), grouped by type and sorted by location. It contains all public-use and military airports in the state. Some private-use and former airports may be included where notable, such as airports that were previously public-use, those with commercial enplanements recorded by the FAA or airports assigned an IATA airport code.

== Airports ==
This list contains the following information:

- **City served** – The city generally associated with the airport, as per the airport's master record with the Federal Aviation Administration. This is not always the actual location since some airports are located in smaller towns outside of the city they serve. It is not meant to be a complete list of cities served, which can be found in or added to each airport's Wikipedia article.
- **FAA** – The location identifier assigned by the Federal Aviation Administration (FAA). These are linked to each airport's page at the South Dakota Department of Transportation.
- **IATA** – The airport code assigned by the International Air Transport Association (IATA). Those that do not match the FAA code are shown in bold.
- **ICAO** – The location indicator assigned by the International Civil Aviation Organization (ICAO).
- **Airport name** – The official airport name. Those shown in **bold** indicate the airport has scheduled passenger service on commercial airlines.
- **Role** – One of four FAA airport categories, as per the 2021–2025 National Plan of Integrated Airport Systems (NPIAS) report released September 2020:
  - P-s: Commercial service – primary are publicly owned airports that receive scheduled passenger service and have more than 10,000 passenger boardings (enplanements) each year. Each primary airport is sub-classified by the FAA as one of the following four "hub" types (s):
    - L: Large hub that accounts for at least 1% of total U.S. passenger enplanements.
    - M: Medium hub that accounts for between 0.25% and 1% of total U.S. passenger enplanements.
    - S: Small hub that accounts for between 0.05% and 0.25% of total U.S. passenger enplanements.
    - N: Nonhub that accounts for less than 0.05% of total U.S. passenger enplanements, but more than 10,000 annual enplanements.
  - CS: Commercial service – nonprimary are publicly owned airports that receive scheduled passenger service and have at least 2,500 passenger boardings each year.
  - R: Reliever airports are designated by the FAA to relieve congestion at a large commercial service airport and to provide more general aviation access to the overall community.
  - GA: General aviation airports are the largest single group of airports in the U.S. airport system. They are public-use airports that do not have scheduled service or have scheduled service with less than 2,500 passenger boardings each year.
- **Enplanements** – The number of enplanements (commercial passenger boardings) that occurred at the airport in calendar year 2024, as per FAA records released October 2025.

City served	FAA	IATA	ICAO	Airport name	Role	Enplanements (2024)
				**Commercial service – primary airports**		
Aberdeen	ABR	ABR	KABR	**Aberdeen Regional Airport**	P-N	23,705
Pierre	PIR	PIR	KPIR	**Pierre Regional Airport**	P-N	14,887
Rapid City	RAP	RAP	KRAP	**Rapid City Regional Airport**	P-S	418,183
Sioux Falls	FSD	FSD	KFSD	**Sioux Falls Regional Airport** (Joe Foss Field)	P-S	701,353
Watertown	ATY	ATY	KATY	**Watertown Regional Airport**	P-N	12,064
				**General aviation airports**		
Belle Fourche	EFC		KEFC	Belle Fourche Municipal Airport	GA	0
Bison	6V5			Bison Municipal Airport	GA	0
Britton	BTN	TTO	KBTN	Britton Municipal Airport	GA	0
Brookings	BKX	BKX	KBKX	Brookings Regional Airport	GA	24
Buffalo	9D2			Harding County Airport	GA	0
Canton	7G9	CTK		Canton Municipal Airport	GA	0
Chamberlain	9V9			Chamberlain Municipal Airport	GA	0
Clark	8D7			Clark County Airport	GA	0
Custer	CUT		KCUT	Custer County Airport	GA	0
De Smet	6E5			Wilder Airport	GA	0
Eagle Butte	84D			Cheyenne Eagle Butte Airport	GA	0
Edgemont	6V0			Edgemont Municipal Airport	GA	0
Eureka	3W8			Eureka Municipal Airport	GA	0
Faith	D07			Faith Municipal Airport	GA	0
Faulkton	3FU			Faulkton Municipal Airport	GA	0
Flandreau	4P3			Flandreau Municipal Airport	GA	0
Gettysburg	0D8			Gettysburg Municipal Airport	GA	0
Gregory	9D1			Gregory Municipal Airport (Flynn Field)	GA	0
Highmore	9D0			Highmore Municipal Airport	GA	0
Hot Springs	HSR		KHSR	Hot Springs Municipal Airport	GA	0
Hoven	9F8			Hoven Municipal Airport	GA	0
Howard	8D9			Howard Municipal Airport	GA	0
Huron	HON	HON	KHON	Huron Regional Airport	GA	0
Kadoka	5V8			Kadoka Municipal Airport	GA	0
Lemmon	LEM	LEM	KLEM	Lemmon Municipal Airport	GA	0
Madison	MDS	XMD	KMDS	Madison Municipal Airport	GA	0
Martin	9V6			Martin Municipal Airport	GA	0
McLaughlin	5P2			McLaughlin Municipal Airport	GA	0
Milbank	1D1			Milbank Municipal Airport	GA	0
Miller	MKA		KMKA	Miller Municipal Airport	GA	0
Mitchell	MHE	MHE	KMHE	Mitchell Municipal Airport	GA	52
Mobridge	MBG	MBG	KMBG	Mobridge Municipal Airport	GA	0
Murdo	8F6			Murdo Municipal Airport	GA	0
Onida	98D			Onida Municipal Airport	GA	0
Parkston	8V3			Parkston Municipal Airport	GA	0
Philip	PHP	PHP	KPHP	Philip Airport (Philip Municipal Airport)	GA	0
Pine Ridge	IEN	XPR	KIEN	Pine Ridge Airport (Oglala Sioux Airport)	GA	0
Platte	1D3			Platte Municipal Airport	GA	2
Presho	5P5			Presho Municipal Airport	GA	0
Redfield	1D8			Redfield Municipal Airport	GA	0
Rosebud	SUO		KSUO	Rosebud Sioux Tribal Airport		0
Sisseton	8D3			Sisseton Municipal Airport	GA	0
Spearfish	SPF	SPF	KSPF	Black Hills Airport (Clyde Ice Field)	GA	11
Springfield	Y03			Springfield Municipal Airport	GA	0
Sturgis	49B			Sturgis Municipal Airport	GA	0
Tea	Y14			Marv Skie-Lincoln County Airport (Great Planes Airport)	GA	0
Vermillion	VMR		KVMR	Harold Davidson Field	GA	0
Wagner	AGZ		KAGZ	Wagner Municipal Airport	GA	0
Wall	6V4			Wall Municipal Airport	GA	0
Webster	1D7			The Sigurd Anderson Airport	GA	0
Wessington Springs	4X4			Wessington Springs Airport	GA	0
Winner	ICR		KICR	Winner Regional Airport (Bob Wiley Field)	GA	0
Yankton	YKN	YKN	KYKN	Chan Gurney Municipal Airport	GA	0
				**Other public use airports** (not listed in NPIAS)		
Arlington	3A9			Arlington Municipal Airport		
Corsica	D65			Corsica Municipal Airport		
Fairburn	3V0			Custer State Park Airport		
Groton	2E6			Groton Municipal Airport		
Herreid	5T4			Herreid Municipal Airport		
Isabel	3Y7			Isabel Municipal Airport		
Kimball	6A6			Kimball Municipal Airport		
Lake Andes	8D8			Lake Andes Municipal Airport		
North Sioux City	7K7			Graham Field		
Timber Lake	D58			Timber Lake Municipal Airport		
White River	7Q7			White River Municipal Airport		
				**Other military airports**		
Rapid City	RCA	RCA	KRCA	Ellsworth Air Force Base		333
				**Notable private-use airports**		
Bowdle	5SD3			Bowdle Municipal Airport		
Harrold	SD50			Harrold Municipal Airport		
				**Former airports** (partial list)		
Clear Lake	~~5H3~~			Clear Lake Municipal Airport (closed 2020)		
Dupree	~~7F2~~			Dupree Municipal Airport (closed 2012?)		
Lake Preston	~~Y34~~			Lake Preston Municipal Airport		
Lennox	~~1D9~~			Skie Air Service Landing Field (closed 1998-2004)		
McIntosh	~~8D6~~			McIntosh Municipal Airport (closed 2015)		
Mission	~~0V6~~			Mission Sioux Airport (closed 2010?)	~~GA~~	

== See also ==
- Essential Air Service
- South Dakota World War II Army Airfields
- Wikipedia:WikiProject Aviation/Airline destination lists: North America#South Dakota
