= Madison Airport =

Madison Airport may refer to:

- Central Kentucky Regional Airport, formerly Madison Airport, in Richmond, Kentucky, United States (FAA: I39)
- Madison Municipal Airport (Georgia) in Madison, Georgia, United States (FAA: 52A)
- Madison Municipal Airport (South Dakota) in Madison, South Dakota, United States (FAA: MDS)
- Madison Regional Airport in Madison, Indiana, United States (FAA:IMS)

Other airports in places named Madison:

- Lac qui Parle County Airport in Madison, Minnesota, United States (FAA: DXX)
- Bruce Campbell Field in Madison, Mississippi, United States (FAA: MBO)
- Dane County Regional Airport in Madison, Wisconsin, United States (FAA: MSN)
- Blackhawk Airfield, near Madison, Wisconsin, United States (FAA: 87Y)

== See also ==
- Madison County Airport (disambiguation)
