= Graham Field =

Graham Field may refer to:

- Graham Field (airport), an airport in North Sioux City, South Dakota, United States
- Graham Field (stadium), a baseball stadium in Plano, Texas, United States
- Hendricks County Airport, also known as Gordon Graham Field, in Danville, Indiana, United States
- Graham Field (author), a travel writer from the UK currently living in Bulgaria
- Graham Field (musician), best known as the keyboardist for Rare Bird
- Graham Field (Bucknell), a field hockey and lacrosse venue in Lewisburg, Pennsylvania, on the campus of Bucknell University
