= KAGZ =

KAGZ may refer to:

- Wagner Municipal Airport (ICAO code KAGZ)
- KANM (Texas A&M University), a college radio station (106.7 FM) owned by Texas A&M University serving the Bryan-College Station area, which is licensed as KAGZ-LP.
- KGFZ, a radio station (97.7 FM) licensed to serve Burke, Texas, United States, which held the call sign KAGZ from 2009 to 2022
