= MDN =

MDN may refer to:

== Computing and technology ==
- MDN Web Docs (formerly Mozilla Developer Network), a Mozilla website for developer documentation
- Message Disposition Notification, a form of return receipt for e-mail
- Telephone number for mobile devices, as in:
  - Mobile device number
  - Mobile dialable number
  - Mobile directory number

== Organizations ==
- Ministry of National Defence (Portugal) (Ministério da Defesa Nacional), the Portuguese defence ministry
- Nicaraguan Democratic Movement (Movimiento Demócratico Nicaragüense)

== Transport ==
- Macedon railway station, Victoria, Australia (station code: MDN)
- Madison Municipal Airport (Indiana), Madison, Indiana, United States (IATA code: MDN)
- Maiden Newton railway station, England (National Rail station code: MDN)
- Medan railway station, North Sumatra, Indonesia (station code: MDN)
- Meriden (Amtrak station), Connecticut, United States (Amtrak station code: MDN)
- Milwaukee District North Line, a rail line in Chicago, Illinois, US
- Minggang East railway station, China (China Railway telegraph code: MDN)
- Morden tube station (London Underground station code: MDN)
- Mudan Airlines, Somali Republic (ICAO code: MDN)

== Other uses ==
- East German mark (Mark der Deutschen Notenbank), the official unit of currency in East Germany from 1964 to 1967
- Maya Day Number, the sum of days in Mesoamerican Long Count calendar
- Mbati language (ISO 639-3: mdn)
- MdN Interactive, the magazine for Macintosh designers Network
- MDN, a television station in Griffith, New South Wales, and sister station of MTN
