= Clark Airport (disambiguation) =

Clark International Airport is the former Clark Air Base, serving the Clark Freeport Zone, Angeles City, Philippines, IATA airport code CRK, ICAO airport code RPLC.

Clark Airport may also refer to:

- Clark Air Base, the present-day Philippine Air Force installation
- Clark Airport (Massachusetts), an airfield operational in the mid-20th century in Hanover, Massachusetts, United States
- Clark County Airport, a public-use airport in Clark County, South Dakota, United States, FAA location identifier 8D7
- Clark Regional Airport, a public use airport in Clark County, Indiana, United States, ICAO code KJVY, FAA location identifier JVY

== See also ==
- Clark Field (disambiguation)
