= Springfield Airport =

Springfield Airport may refer to:

- Springfield Airport (Massachusetts), an abandoned airfield in Springfield, Massachusetts, United States
- Springfield-Beckley Municipal Airport near Springfield, Ohio, United States (FAA/IATA: SGH)
- Springfield-Branson National Airport near Springfield, Missouri, United States (FAA/IATA: SGF)
- Springfield Robertson County Airport near Springfield, Tennessee, United States (FAA: M91)
- Lebanon-Springfield Airport near Springfield, Kentucky, United States (FAA: 6I2)

Other airports in places named Springfield:

- Abraham Lincoln Capital Airport near Springfield, Illinois, United States (FAA/IATA: SPI)
- Downtown Airport (Missouri) near Springfield, Missouri, United States (FAA: 3DW)
- Hartness State Airport near Springfield, Vermont, United States (FAA/IATA: VSF)
- Westfield-Barnes Regional Airport near Westfield/Springfield, Massachusetts, United States (FAA/IATA: BAF)
- Westover Metropolitan Airport near Springfield/Chicopee, Massachusetts, United States (FAA/IATA: CEF)

See also:

- Springfield Municipal Airport (disambiguation)
