= KANM =

KANM may refer to:

- KANM (FM), a radio station (90.3 FM) licensed to serve Grants, New Mexico, United States
- KANM (Texas A&M University), a college radio station (KAGZ-LP 106.7 FM) owned by Texas A&M University serving the Bryan-College Station area
- KIVA (AM), a radio station (1600 AM) licensed to serve Albuquerque, New Mexico, United States, which held the call sign KANM from 2002 to 2005
- KESP, a radio station (970 AM) licensed to serve Modesto, California, United States, which held the call sign KANM from 1998 to 2000
