= MBG =

MBG may refer to:

- Marble Blast Gold, 2002 3D platform game
- Medal for Bravery (Gold), rank of the Hong Kong honours system
- Mercedes-Benz Group, a German automotive company
- Missouri Botanical Garden (more commonly referred to as MoBot)
- Money-back guarantee, a simple guarantee
- Mobridge Municipal Airport, Mobridge, South Dakota, US, by IATA and FAA LID
- Free Nutritious Meals (Makan Bergizi Gratis), an initiative of the Indonesian government under President Prabowo Subianto
