= Madison County Airport =

Madison County Airport may refer to:

- Madison County Airport (Ohio) in Madison County, Ohio, United States (FAA: UYF)
- Madison County Executive Airport in Madison County, Alabama, United States (FAA: MDQ)
- Central Kentucky Regional Airport in Madison County, Kentucky, United States (FAA: I39)
- Rexburg-Madison County Airport in Madison County, Idaho, United States (FAA: RXE)
- Winterset-Madison County Airport in Madison County, Iowa, United States (FAA: 3Y3)

== See also ==
- Madison Airport (disambiguation)
- Madison Municipal Airport (disambiguation)
