= Y14 =

Y14 may refer to:

== Train stations ==
- Ichigaya Station, in Chiyoda, Tokyo, Japan
- Kure Station, in Kure, Hiroshima, Japan
- Takuma Station, in Mitoyo, Kagawa, Japan
- Yotsubashi Station, in Nishi-ku, Osaka, Japan
- Zhongyuan metro station, in Taipei, Taiwan

== Other uses ==
- Y14 (gene), encoding RNA-binding protein 8A
- GER Class Y14, a class steam locomotive
- FAA location identifier for Marv Skie–Lincoln County Airport in Tea, South Dakota US
- Xi'an Y-14, a Chinese aircraft
