= XPR =

XPR or xpr may refer to:

- XPR, the IATA code for Pine Ridge Airport, South Dakota, United States
- xpr, the ISO 639-3 code for Parthian language, an extinct language in Parthia
