= Sturgis Municipal Airport =

Sturgis Municipal Airport may refer to:

- Sturgis Municipal Airport (Kentucky) in Sturgis, Kentucky, United States (FAA: TWT)
- Sturgis Municipal Airport (South Dakota) in Sturgis, South Dakota, United States (FAA: 49B)
