= KMDS =

KMDS may refer to:

- Madison Municipal Airport (South Dakota) (ICAO code KMDS)
- KMDS (FM), a radio station (107.1 FM) licensed to serve Las Vegas, New Mexico, United States
