= Rosebud Sioux Tribal Airport =

Airport in South Dakota, United States

- IATA: none; ICAO: KSUO; FAA LID: SUO

Summary
- Airport type: Public
- Owner: Rosebud Sioux Tribe
- Serves: Rosebud, South Dakota
- Elevation AMSL: 2,724 ft / 830 m
- Coordinates: 43°15′30″N 100°51′34″W

Map
- Location of airport in South Dakota SUO (the United States)

Runways
Direction	Length		Surface
Direction	ft	m	Surface
16/34	4,800	1,463	Concrete

Statistics (2012)
- Aircraft operations: 700
- Source: Federal Aviation Administration

Rosebud Sioux Tribal Airport (ICAO: KSUO, FAA LID: SUO) is a public use airport located two nautical miles (4 km) south of the central business district of Rosebud, in Todd County, South Dakota, United States. The airport is owned by the Rosebud Sioux Tribe.

Although many U.S. airports use the same three-letter location identifier for the FAA and IATA, this facility is assigned SUO by the FAA but has no designation from the IATA.

== Facilities and aircraft ==
Rosebud Sioux Tribal Airport resides at elevation of 2,724 feet (830 m) above mean sea level. It has one runway designated 16/34 with a concrete surface measuring 4,800 by 75 feet (1,463 x 23 m).

For the 12-month period ending June 19, 2012, the airport had 700 general aviation aircraft operations, an average of 58 per month.

== See also ==
- List of airports in South Dakota
- Mission Sioux Airport
