= Brookings Regional Airport =

Airport in South Dakota, United States

- IATA: BKX; ICAO: KBKX; FAA LID: BKX

Summary
- Airport type: Public
- Owner: City of Brookings
- Serves: Brookings, South Dakota
- Elevation AMSL: 1,648 ft (502 m)
- Coordinates: 44°18′17″N 096°49′01″W
- Website: CityOfBrookings.org/...

Map
- Location within South Dakota Location within the United States

Runways
Direction	Length		Surface
Direction	ft	m	Surface
12/30	6,000	1,829	Asphalt/concrete
17/35	3,600	1,097	Asphalt/concrete

Statistics (2020)
- Aircraft operations: 32,025
- Based aircraft: 64
- Source: Federal Aviation Administration

Brookings Regional Airport (IATA: BKX, ICAO: KBKX, FAA LID: BKX), formerly Brookings Municipal Airport, is in Brookings, in Brookings County, South Dakota. The National Plan of Integrated Airport Systems for 2011–2015 categorized it as a general aviation airport. The airport has had no airline service since September 2009 when the United States Department of Transportation ended the subsidy for its Essential Air Service.

== Facilities ==
Brookings Regional Airport covers 576 acres (233 ha) at an elevation of 1,648 feet (502 m). It has two asphalt runways: 12/30 is 6,000 by 100 feet (1,829 x 30 m) and 17/35 is 3,600 by 60 feet (1,097 x 18 m).

In 2020 the airport had 32,025 aircraft operations, average 88 per day: 99% general aviation, 1% air taxi, and <1% military. 64 aircraft were then based at the airport: 56 single-engine, 5 multi-engine, and 3 glider.

In 2012 the city of Brookings completed a $19 million reconstruction project, including realigning and lengthening the runways.

== Airlines and destinations ==
No airline service is scheduled.

The first airline flights were Western DC-3s in 1950; Western pulled out in 1959. Braniff arrived in 1953-54; North Central replaced Braniff in 1957 and successor Republic left in approximately late 1981.

== See also ==
- List of airports in South Dakota

== Other sources ==
- Essential Air Service documents (Docket DOT-OST-1997-2785) from the U.S. Department of Transportation:
  - Order 2003-6-28 (June 6, 2003): tentatively terminates the subsidy eligibility of Brookings, South Dakota, under the Essential air Service Program because the subsidy per passenger exceeds the $200 per passenger statutory ceiling and the community is less than 210 highway miles from the large hub airport at Minneapolis/St. Paul, Minnesota. The Department is also setting a final subsidy annual rate of $1,911,452 for Great Lakes Aviation, Ltd., for service at Brookings and Huron, South Dakota, from January 1, 2003, until the termination of service at Brookings becomes effective.
  - Order 2004-4-8 (April 6, 2004): requests proposals from carriers interested in providing essential air service (EAS) at Brookings, Huron and/or Pierre, South Dakota, for a two-year period, with or without subsidy.
  - Order 2004-7-5 (July 6, 2004): selecting Air Midwest to provide subsidized essential air service at Brookings and Huron, for a two-year period; to consist of 12 weekly flights routed Huron - Brookings - Omaha - Brookings - Huron, with 19-seat Beech 1900-D aircraft, at an annual subsidy of $2,078,727.
  - Order 2006-8-11 (August 11, 2006): selecting Great Lakes Aviation, Ltd., to provide subsidized essential air service (EAS) at Brookings and Huron, South Dakota, consisting of two daily one-stop round trips to Denver International Airport, at annual subsidy rates of $1,212,400, and $793,733, respectively, beginning October 1, 2006.
  - Order 2008-2-37 (February 29, 2008): requesting proposals from carriers interested in providing essential air service (EAS) at Brookings, Hagerstown and Lancaster through September 30, 2008, with or without subsidy. None of the three communities currently receive scheduled air service. All three communities had lost subsidy eligibility because they did not meet statutory eligibility criteria—Hagerstown and Lancaster because they are within 70 driving miles of a large hub (Philadelphia International Airport), and Brookings because its subsidy per passenger exceeded $200 and the community is within 210 miles of a large hub airport (Minneapolis International Airport). Section 409 of Vision 100 (Public Law 108-176, Vision 100 – Century of Aviation Reauthorization Act of 2003) entitled communities that lost subsidy eligibility during the two-year period ending on the date of enactment, December 12, 2003, to petition the Department to review the mileage determination.
  - Order 2008-12-30 (December 30, 2008): selecting Great Lakes Aviation, Ltd., to provide subsidized essential air service (EAS) at Brookings, South Dakota, beginning when the carrier inaugurates service, through September 30, 2009, at the annual subsidy rate of $1,887,110.
