= Clark Field (disambiguation) =

Clark Field may refer to:

- Clark Air Base, a former military airfield, known as Diosdado Macapagal International Airport, but in February 2012 name reverted to Clark International Airport serving the Clark Freeport Zone, Angeles City, Philippines
- Clark Field (Fort Worth, Texas), a former home stadium of the TCU Horned Frogs football team
- Clark Field (1887), predecessor to the 1928–1974 version of Clark Field in Austin
- Clark Field (1928), a former baseball park that served the University of Texas baseball team from 1928 to 1974
- Stephenville Clark Regional Airport, an airport serving Stephenville, Texas, United States (FAA: SEP)
- Clark Field, a football stadium at Somerset High School in Somerset, Kentucky
- K. Raymond Clark Field, a multisport stadium at Coe College in Cedar Rapids, Iowa

== See also ==
- Clark Airport (disambiguation)
