= Springfield Municipal Airport =

Springfield Municipal Airport may refer to:

- Springfield Municipal Airport (Colorado) in Springfield, Colorado, United States (FAA: 8V7)
- Springfield Municipal Airport (Minnesota) in Springfield, Minnesota, United States (FAA: D42)
- Springfield Municipal Airport (South Dakota) in Springfield, South Dakota, United States (FAA: Y03)
- Springfield-Beckley Municipal Airport in Springfield, Ohio, United States (FAA: SGH)
