= Chan Gurney Municipal Airport =

Airport in South Dakota, United States

- IATA: YKN; ICAO: KYKN; FAA LID: YKN

Summary
- Airport type: Public
- Owner: City of Yankton
- Location: Yankton, South Dakota
- Elevation AMSL: 1,306 ft (398 m)
- Coordinates: 42°55′00″N 97°23′09″W
- Interactive map of Chan Gurney Municipal Airport

Runways
Direction	Length		Surface
Direction	ft	m	Surface
1/19	3,380	1,030	Asphalt
13/31	6,095	1,858	Concrete

Chan Gurney Municipal Airport (IATA: YKN, ICAO: KYKN, FAA LID: YKN) is a regional airport located three miles north of Yankton, in Yankton County, South Dakota. It is named for John Chandler Gurney, a native of Yankton who was a sergeant in the U.S. Army during World War I and later became a member of the United States Senate.

== History ==
North Central began Douglas DC-3 flights to Yankton in 1957–1958; successor Republic left about 1982 and Yankton dropped out of the OAG in 1989–1990. AAA Airlines also served Yankton with non-stop flights to Sioux Falls, South Dakota, and to Norfolk, Nebraska. In April 2001, United Express discontinued its flight to Denver.

== Facilities and aircraft ==
The airport covers 458 acres (185 ha) and has two runways.

== See also ==
- List of airports in South Dakota
