= Aberdeen Regional Airport =

Airport in Brown County, South Dakota

Aberdeen Regional Airport Aberdeen Army Airfield
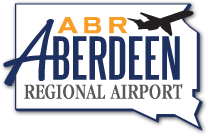
- IATA: ABR; ICAO: KABR; FAA LID: ABR

Summary
- Airport type: Public
- Owner: City of Aberdeen
- Serves: Aberdeen, South Dakota
- Elevation AMSL: 1,302 ft (397 m)
- Coordinates: 45°26′54″N 098°25′22″W
- Website: aberdeenregionalairport.us

Map
- Location of airport in South Dakota ABR (the United States)

Runways
Direction	Length		Surface
Direction	ft	m	Surface
13/31	6,901	2,103	Concrete
17/35	5,500	1,676	Asphalt

Statistics (2022)
- Aircraft operations: 39,746
- Based aircraft: 66
- Source: Federal Aviation Administration

Aberdeen Regional Airport (IATA: ABR, ICAO: KABR, FAA LID: ABR) is a city-owned, public-use airport located two nautical miles (3.7 km) east of the central business district of Aberdeen, a city in Brown County, South Dakota, United States. It is mostly used for general aviation with Delta Connection as its sole commercial airline.

== History ==
Aberdeen Regional Airport was founded as Aberdeen Municipal Airport in 1921, north of Aberdeen, SD. It included two 2,500 foot runways as well as ground services. Additionally, Security Skycraft Corporation began regularly scheduled service from Aberdeen Municipal Airport at a cost of 50¢ per mile. In 1923, Aberdeen hosted the first fly-in event in South Dakota. In 1930, funds were allocated for the purchase of 160 acres of land for the airport, in a different location. Gravel runways and a steel hangar were also added.

In 1946, the airport's name was changed to Saunders Field in honor of Brigadier General Laverne Saunders, and the name was changed again to its current name, Aberdeen Municipal Airport, in 1979. The airfield area is still called Saunders Field. The, airfield was converted into a commercial airport with North Central Airlines operating DC-9-30, DC-3, and Convair CV5800 aircraft to Minneapolis. A new terminal was built too which featured a restaurant dubbed, "Airport Cafe".

Starting in 2015, Sun Country Airlines began seasonal charter air service to Laughlin/Bullhead using Boeing 737-800 aircraft dubbed casino flights. In 2019, a new larger jetway was added to the airport, which was able to support aircraft as big as an Airbus A321.

The long 15 year CRJ200 service at the airport ended in October 2023 being replaced by the CRJ700, and CRJ900, followed by the CRJ550 a year later.

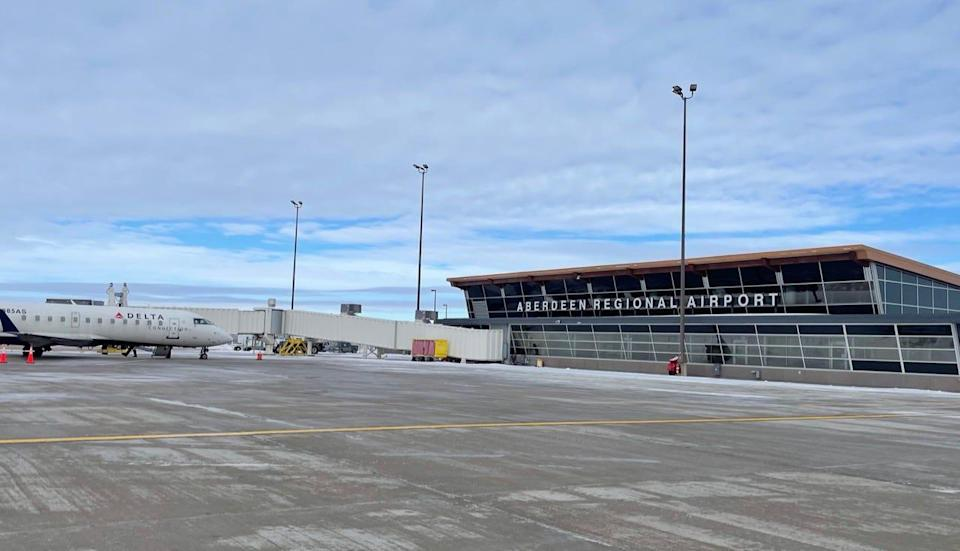
A Delta Connection CRJ200 parked at the current terminal and new jetway

== Facilities and aircraft ==
Aberdeen Regional Airport covers an area of 1,284 acres (520 ha) at an elevation of 1,302 feet (397 m) above mean sea level. It has two runways: 13/31 is 6,901 by 100 feet (2,103 x 30 m) with a concrete surface; 17/35 is 5,500 by 100 feet (1,676 x 30 m) with an asphalt surface. The airport is able to handle aircraft as big as a Boeing 737-900 or Airbus A321.

For the 12-month period ending December 31, 2022, the airport had 39,746 aircraft operations, an average of 109 per day: 83% general aviation, 4% scheduled commercial, 13% air taxi and <1% military. At that time there were 66 aircraft based at this airport: 42 single-engine, 16 multi-engine, 7 jet and 1 helicopter.

Delta Connection is the only commercial airline currently serving Aberdeen Regional Airport, providing daily flights to Minneapolis/St. Paul operated by SkyWest Airlines.

== Airlines and destinations ==
=== Passenger ===
Delta Connection connects Aberdeen Airport to Minneapolis–Saint Paul International Airport.

=== Cargo ===
Airlines	Destinations
Alpine Air Express	Sioux Falls
FedEx Feeder operated by CSA Air	Sioux Falls

== See also ==
- List of airports in South Dakota
- South Dakota World War II Army Airfields
- 31st Flying Training Wing (World War II)
