= Hot Springs Municipal Airport =

Airport in South Dakota, United States

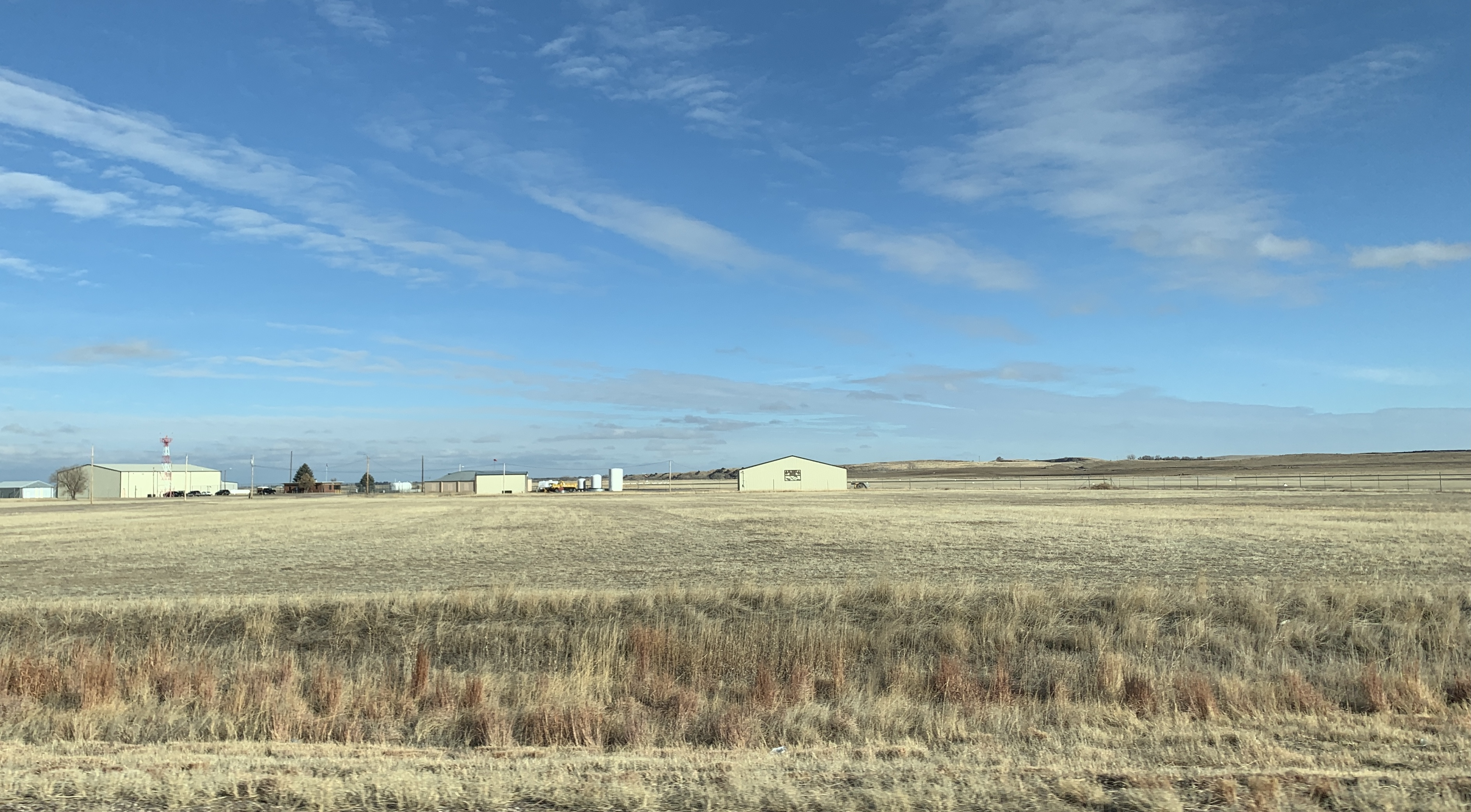
- IATA: none; ICAO: KHSR; FAA LID: HSR

Summary
- Airport type: Public
- Owner: City of Hot Springs
- Serves: Hot Springs, South Dakota
- Elevation AMSL: 3,150 ft (960 m)
- Coordinates: 43°22′06″N 103°23′18″W
- Interactive map of Hot Springs Municipal Airport

Runways
Direction	Length		Surface
Direction	ft	m	Surface
1/19	4,506	1,373	Asphalt
6/24	3,926	1,197	Turf

Statistics (2009)
- Aircraft operations: 6,820
- Based aircraft: 29
- Source: Federal Aviation Administration

Hot Springs Municipal Airport (ICAO: KHSR, FAA LID: HSR) is a city-owned public-use airport located five nautical miles (9 km) southeast of the central business district of Hot Springs, a city in Fall River County, South Dakota, United States. According to the FAA's National Plan of Integrated Airport Systems for 2009–2013, it is categorized as a general aviation facility.

Although many U.S. airports use the same three-letter location identifier for the FAA and IATA, this facility is assigned HSR by the FAA but has no designation from the IATA.

== Facilities and aircraft ==
Hot Springs Municipal Airport covers an area of 518 acres (210 ha) at an elevation of 3,150 feet (960 m) above mean sea level. It has two runways: 1/19 is 4,506 by 100 feet (1,373 x 30 m) with an asphalt pavement and 6/24 is 3,926 by 235 feet (1,197 x 72 m) with a turf surface.

For the 12-month period ending June 14, 2022, the airport had 6,820 aircraft operations, an average of 131 per week: 99% general aviation and 2% military. At that time there were 29 aircraft based at this airport: 23 single-engine and 6 glider.

Currently there are 33 aircraft based on the field with 29 single engine airplanes, 1 helicopter and three glider planes.

== See also ==
- List of airports in South Dakota
