= Wall Municipal Airport =

Coordinates: 43°59′57.2″N 102°15′12.6″W

- IATA: none; ICAO: none; FAA LID: 6V4

Summary
- Airport type: Public use
- Owner: City of Wall
- Operator: City of Wall
- Serves: Wall, South Dakota
- Location: Wall, South Dakota
- Elevation AMSL: 2,812 ft / 857 m
- Interactive map of Wall Municipal Airport

Runways
Direction	Length		Surface
Direction	ft	m	Surface
12/30	3,499	1,066	Asphalt
18/36	1,981	604	Turf

Statistics (2022)
- Aircraft operations: 3406
- Based aircraft: 13
- Source: Federal Aviation Administration

Wall Municipal Airport (FAA LID: 6V4) is a public-use airport located less than 1 mile (1.6 km) northwest of Wall in Pennington County, South Dakota, United States. The airport is publicly owned by the City of Wall. The city has completed plans to extend the runway to 4,418 feet (1,347 m). The plans have completed the permitting stage but construction has not taken place as of March 2022.

== See also ==
- List of airports in South Dakota
