= Impress Holdings =

Japanese company

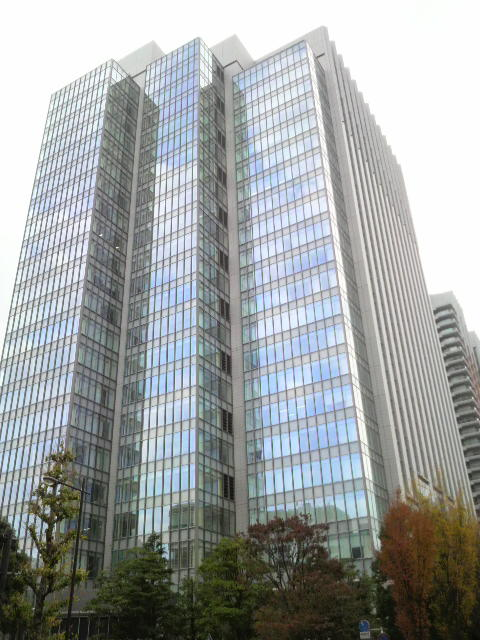
- Headquarters
- Native name: 株式会社インプレスホールディングス
- Romanized name: Kabushiki-gaisha Inpuresu
- Formerly: Impress Corporation
- Type: Public
- Industry: IT industry; Publishing industry; Media industry
- Genre: Non-fiction
- Founded: April 1, 1992; 34 years ago in Tokyo, Japan
- Founder: Tsukamoto Keiichiro
- Headquarters: 1-105, Kanda-Jinbōchō, Chiyoda, Tokyo, Japan
- Area served: Japan
- Brands: Dekiru Series; Impress Watch; MdN; NextPublishing; Tabi to Tetsudō
- Number of employees: 269 (2026)
- Website: www.impressholdings.com

Impress Holding, Inc., (Note: Japanese: 株式会社インプレスホールディングス, Hepburn: Kabushiki-gaisha Inpuresu Hōrudingusu; sometimes shortened to Impress HD (インプレスHD)) formerly known as Impress Corporation (Note: 株式会社インプレス, Kabushiki-gaisha Inpuresu) and also known as Impress Group (インプレスグループ), is a Japanese publishing and digital media company. The company is known for operating the IT news website Impress Watch alongside other websites. The company also publishes books, articles, and magazines related to the tech industry and the internet. It is known as a pioneer in publishing internet-related books.

It was launched by Tsukamoto Keiichiro in April 1992 and became a public company in fiscal year 2000. It delisted itself from the stock exchange in July 2025.

== History ==
Impress Corporation was launched on April 1, 1992, by Tsukamoto Keiichiro. The company later launched Internet Watch, Japan's first email-based magazine, in December 1995 as a preliminary release. It was officially released in February 1996.

Initially, Impress Group published digital content in six categories: Internet, Computer, Graphics, News & Sports, Music, and Movies on its Impress Watch website.

Impress Corporation received approximately ¥2.6 billion (1999) (US$22.83 million) in investment from Daiwa SBCM and Goldman Sachs in October 1999. On December 3, Impress Corporation became a holding company dividing the company into six companies, and became a public company by fiscal year 2000. In 2004, it changed its name to Impress Holdings, Inc.

Following the end of the fiscal year in March 2025, the company was reported to have a net loss of ¥105 million (2025) (US$663,230.5), the second consecutive year of losses. Following this, on May 13, the company announced that the company will be delisted from the stock exchange through a stock consolidation on July 28. On July 30, 3,306,600 shares of the company were consolidated into 1 share.

== Subsidiaries and publications ==
=== Digital ===
Impress R&D (インプレスR＆D, Inpuresu R&D) is a digital publisher of books under its flagship website NextPublishing, which was launched in 2012. The company established a distribution infrastructure for books using print on demand, where it partners with bookstores and other entities to print and sell books on a single-copy basis under the "digital first, book last" concept.

Ganref (stylized in all caps) is a photo-sharing site operated by the company. It features content related to camera equipment information.

Impress launched Dekiru.net (できるネット, Dekiru Netto) as an digital version of the Dekiru book series in 2014. It features numerous articles explaining how to use devices such as PCs and smartphones. By June 2018, the site reached 6.73 million monthly page views and 3.99 million unique users.

On May 15, 2015, Impress launched Netatopi (ネタとぴ), which publishes articles related to IT and smartphones, entertainment, food, video games and hobbies, anime and manga, lifestyle, and the internet.

On December 15, 2025, in collaboration with Maruzen CHI Holdings, Impress Group launched TechLib, an online subscription based e-book service for technical books intended for IT engineers gathered from affiliated publisher. It features books about technology such as programming languages, artificial intelligence.

==== Impress Watch ====
Impress Watch
- Website type: News website
- Available in: Japanese
- Founded: December 1995
- Website: watch.impress.co.jp
- Advertising: yes
- Commercial: yes
- Registration: Optional

Impress Watch Co., Ltd (株式会社Impress Watch, Kabushiki-gaisha Inpuresu Wuotchi) is an IT news company that operates the IT news website Impress Watch. It features IT and electronics-related news.

The website, officially called Impress Watch series, is divided into various subsections, including:

- Forest Watch (窓の杜, Mado no Mori; lit. 'Windows' Forest'): a subsection of the Impress Watch that publishes online software information for Windows. It was described as one of the largest software information sites in Japan in 2004.
- Internet Watch (stylized as INTERNET Watch): a subsection of the Impress Watch that talks about internet-related topics. It was launched in December 1995. It also contains content from Internet magazine (stylized as iNTERNET magazine), which originally launched in 1994 but ceased publication in 2006. It was rebooted in November 2017 as part of Internet Watch.
- AV Watch, which publishes news about television, video, and audio. It also publishes articles about audiovisual equipment. It trended on Twitter in May 2017 as people confused the "AV" in the name for adult video instead of audiovisual.
- PC Watch, which focuses on the latest news about PCs and technology.
- Digital Camera Watch (デジカメWatch), which publishes news and reviews on digital cameras.
- Akiba PC Hotline! (stylized as AKIBA PC Hotline!), which publishes news about PC parts and products and market trends in Akihabara.
- Kaden Watch (家電Watch), which publishes news and reviews about home appliances.
- Kētai Watch (ケータイWatch), which publishes news about smartphones, mobile devices, and trends in the telecommunications industry.
- Cloud Watch (クラウドWatch), which publishes news about cloud computing-related services and products.
- Car Watch, which publishes news and reviews about cars.
- Travel Watch (トラベルWatch), which publishes vehicle, road, and travel tips as well as gadget reviews.
- Gourmet Watch (グルメWatch), which publishes news about foods, convenience stores, and restaurants.
- Game Watch (stylized as GAME Watch), which publishes news related to video gaming.
- Hobby Watch (stylized as HOBBY Watch, which publishes news about figurines, and game merchandise.
- Kodomo to IT (こどもとIT), which publishes news and case studies related to STEAM education.

Other subsections include: AI Watch, Manga Watch (stylized as MANGA Watch), and Impress Watch Video.

Defunct subsections include:

- BB Watch, which was launched in July 2001 as Broadband Watch. It ceased publication and merged into Internet Watch in January 2010.
- Robot Watch, which was launched in May 2006, it was the first news website in Japan that focus on robotics. It ceased publication and subsequently was merged into Game Watch on December 14, 2009.

It was established as a separate company on October 3, 2005. Around that time in August 2005, the website had 168,698,519 monthly views.

=== Print ===
MdN Corporation (エムディエヌコーポレーション, Emudienukōporēshon) was a book publishing company related to design and graphics. It was founded in 1992. MdN is the flagship magazine, which published articles about Macintosh. It ceased publication in 2019. The company was absorbed and merged into the Impress Corporation on July 1, 2026.

Ikaros Publications (イカロス出版, Ikarosu Shuppan) publishes books related to aviation, railways, and military affairs. Its flagship magazine is Airline. Tenmujin (天夢人) publishes books and magazines related to travel, railways, and history. Tabi to Tetsudō (旅と鉄道; lit. 'Travel and Railway') is the flagship magazine of the publication.

Yama-kei Publishers (山と溪谷社, Yama-keisha) publishes books and magazines related to nature, mountaineering, skiing, and the outdoors. The company was founded in 1940. Yama to Keikoku (山と溪谷) is its flagship magazine. It became a wholly owned subsidiary of Impress Holdings on November 30, 2006. On October 28, 2014, it began publishing Yamakei Shinsho book series (ヤマケイ新書), a book about mountain climbers.

Dekiru book series (できるシリーズ) is a series of IT tool guidebooks that use numerous images to explain procedures. DOS/V POWER Report is a magazine that covers the latest information on PCs and PC parts. It was first published in 1991 and became a monthly publication in 1995. It ceased publication in December 2023.

==== Rittor Music ====
Rittor Music
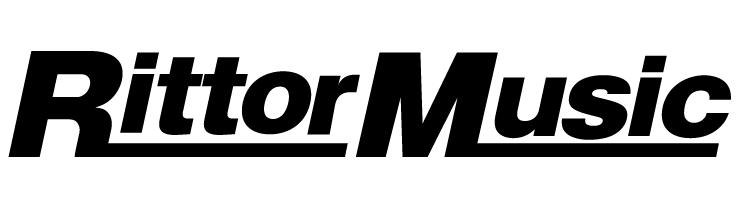
- Native name: 株式会社リットーミュージック
- Romanized name: Kabushiki-gaisha Rittō Myūjikku
- Type: Subsidiary
- Industry: Music industry
- Founded: 1978
- Area served: Japan
- Parent: Impress Holdings
- Website: www.rittor-music.co.jp

Rittor Music, Inc. (株式会社リットーミュージック, Kabushiki-gaisha Rittō Myūjikku) is a magazine and book publishing company related to music. On May 15, 2015, it began publishing under the name Rittōsha (立東舎). The company was founded in 1978 as a publisher of sheet music.

It currently publishes music magazines such as:

- Keyboard Magazine (キーボード・マガジン), which features information about keyboards. First published in 1978, it became an unscheduled publication in April 2020.
- Sound & Recording Magazine (サウンド＆レコーディング・マガジン), a monthly magazine that publishes information on music composition.
- Bass Magazine (ベース・マガジン), a quarterly magazine focusing on information related to bass guitar.
- Guitar Magazine (ギター・マガジン), a monthly magazine related to information about guitars.
- Acoustic Guitar Magazine (アコースティック・ギター・マガジン), a quarterly magazine publishing information related to acoustic guitar.
- Rhythm & Drums Magazine (リズム＆ドラム・マガジン), a quarterly magazine publishing information related to drums and percussion.

It used to publish the following magazines:

- Groove (stylized in all caps), which featured information on disc jockeys and hip-hop music. It ceased publication in March 2015.
- Dance Style Kids, which featured information aimed at children learning to dance. It ceased publication in March 2014.
- Piano Style, which was a magazine released every 20th of odd-numbered months featuring information about pianos. It ceased publication in December 2012.
- Sax & Brass Magazine (サックス＆ブラス・マガジン), which features information on wind instruments such as saxophones and trumpets. It was first published in 2006. In 2014, it was relaunched as Sax Magazine but ceased publication in March 2015.

The company also operates Digimart (デジマート), Japan's largest online search engine for musical instruments.
