= Miller Municipal Airport =

- IATA: none; ICAO: KMKA; FAA LID: MKA

Summary
- Airport type: Public
- Owner: City of Miller
- Serves: Miller, South Dakota
- Elevation AMSL: 1,570 ft / 479 m
- Coordinates: 44°31′31″N 098°57′29″W

Map
- Location of airport in South Dakota MKA (the United States)

Runways
Direction	Length		Surface
Direction	ft	m	Surface
15/33	3,601	1,098	Asphalt

Statistics (2022)
- Aircraft operations (year ending 08/24/2022): 7,260
- Based aircraft: 7
- Source: Federal Aviation Administration

Miller Municipal Airport (ICAO: KMKA, FAA LID: MKA) is a city-owned, public-use airport located two nautical miles (4 km) east of the central business district of Miller, a city in Hand County, South Dakota, United States. It is included in the National Plan of Integrated Airport Systems for 2011–2015, which categorized it as a general aviation facility.

Although many U.S. airports use the same three-letter location identifier for the FAA and IATA, this airport is assigned MKA by the FAA but has no designation from the IATA (which assigned MKA to Mariánské Lázně Airport in Mariánské Lázně, Czech Republic).

== Facilities and aircraft ==
Miller Municipal Airport covers an area of 252 acres (102 ha) at an elevation of 1,570 feet (480 m) above mean sea level. It has one runway designated 15/33 with an asphalt surface measuring 3,601 by 60 feet (1,098 x 18 m).

For the 12-month period ending August 24, 2022, the airport had 7,260 general aviation aircraft operations, an average of 20 per day. At that time there were 7 aircraft based at this airport: all single-engine.

== See also ==
- List of airports in South Dakota
