= Britton Municipal Airport =

- IATA: TTO; ICAO: KBTN; FAA LID: BTN

Summary
- Airport type: Public
- Owner: City of Britton
- Serves: Britton, South Dakota
- Elevation AMSL: 1,318 ft (402 m)
- Coordinates: 45°48′54″N 097°44′34″W
- Interactive map of Britton Municipal Airport

Runways
Direction	Length		Surface
Direction	ft	m	Surface
13/31	4,210	1,283	Asphalt
1/19	2,034	620	Turf

Statistics (2022)
- Aircraft operations (year ending 4/28/2022): 2,240
- Based aircraft: 10
- Source: Federal Aviation Administration

Britton Municipal Airport (IATA: TTO, ICAO: KBTN, FAA LID: BTN) is a city-owned, public-use airport located two nautical miles (3.7 km) northeast of the central business district of Britton, a city in Marshall County, South Dakota, United States. According to the FAA's National Plan of Integrated Airport Systems for 2009–2013, it is categorized as a general aviation airport.

Although many U.S. airports use the same three-letter location identifier for the FAA and IATA, this airport is assigned BTN by the FAA and TTO by the IATA (which assigned BTN to Marlboro County Jetport in Bennettsville, South Carolina).

== Facilities and aircraft ==
Britton Municipal Airport covers an area of 192 acres (78 ha) at an elevation of 1,318 feet (402 m) above mean sea level. It has two runways: 13/31 is 4,210 by 75 feet (1,283 by 23 m) with an asphalt pavement; 1/19 is 2,034 by 120 feet (620 by 37 m) with a turf surface.

For the 12-month period ending April 28, 2022, the airport had 2,240 general aviation aircraft operations, an average of 43 per week. At that time there were 10 aircraft based at this airport: 8 single-engine and 2 multi-engine.

== See also ==
- List of airports in South Dakota
