= Custer County Airport =

Airport in Custer, South Dakota

- IATA: none; ICAO: KCUT; FAA LID: CUT

Summary
- Airport type: Public
- Location: Custer, South Dakota
- Opened: January 9, 1969; 57 years ago
- Elevation AMSL: 5,620 ft (1,710 m)
- Coordinates: 43°44′1.18″N 103°37′10.20″W

Map
- Location within South Dakota Location within the United States

Runways
Direction	Length		Surface
Direction	ft	m	Surface
08/26	5,500	1,676	Asphalt
- Source: Federal Aviation Administration

Custer County Airport (ICAO: KCUT, FAA LID: CUT) is a public-use airport located 2 mi (3.2 km) southwest of Custer, South Dakota, United States.

Although most U.S. airports use the same three-letter location identifier for the FAA, ICAO and IATA, Custer County Airport is assigned CUT by the FAA and KCUT by the ICAO but has no designation from the IATA.

== Facilities ==
Custer County Airport covers an area of 86 acres (35 ha) which contains one asphalt paved runway (08/26) measuring 5,500 ft × 60 ft (1,676 m × 18 m).

== Climate ==
Climate data for Custer County Airport, South Dakota, 1991–2020 normals: 5545ft (1690m)
Month	Jan	Feb	Mar	Apr	May	Jun	Jul	Aug	Sep	Oct	Nov	Dec	Year
Record high °F (°C)	65 (18)	61 (16)	72 (22)	81 (27)	88 (31)	96 (36)	99 (37)	95 (35)	94 (34)	82 (28)	73 (23)	63 (17)	99 (37)
Mean maximum °F (°C)	55.0 (12.8)	52.1 (11.2)	63.0 (17.2)	72.1 (22.3)	80.8 (27.1)	88.8 (31.6)	92.6 (33.7)	90.3 (32.4)	86.3 (30.2)	75.1 (23.9)	64.4 (18.0)	54.0 (12.2)	93.7 (34.3)
Mean daily maximum °F (°C)	35.2 (1.8)	35.2 (1.8)	43.5 (6.4)	50.1 (10.1)	59.6 (15.3)	71.1 (21.7)	79.2 (26.2)	77.8 (25.4)	69.0 (20.6)	54.1 (12.3)	42.9 (6.1)	34.9 (1.6)	54.4 (12.4)
Daily mean °F (°C)	25.1 (−3.8)	25.1 (−3.8)	32.9 (0.5)	39.3 (4.1)	48.6 (9.2)	58.9 (14.9)	66.5 (19.2)	64.7 (18.2)	55.9 (13.3)	43.0 (6.1)	32.6 (0.3)	25.2 (−3.8)	43.2 (6.2)
Mean daily minimum °F (°C)	15.0 (−9.4)	15.0 (−9.4)	22.2 (−5.4)	28.5 (−1.9)	37.5 (3.1)	46.7 (8.2)	53.7 (12.1)	51.6 (10.9)	42.9 (6.1)	31.8 (−0.1)	22.2 (−5.4)	15.5 (−9.2)	31.9 (0.0)
Mean minimum °F (°C)	−8.4 (−22.4)	−10.8 (−23.8)	2.0 (−16.7)	11.0 (−11.7)	22.6 (−5.2)	34.0 (1.1)	43.0 (6.1)	39.7 (4.3)	28.8 (−1.8)	12.1 (−11.1)	1.1 (−17.2)	−7.8 (−22.1)	−17.7 (−27.6)
Record low °F (°C)	−23 (−31)	−29 (−34)	−16 (−27)	−4 (−20)	12 (−11)	30 (−1)	37 (3)	31 (−1)	21 (−6)	−10 (−23)	−14 (−26)	−24 (−31)	−29 (−34)
Average precipitation inches (mm)	0.41 (10)	0.59 (15)	0.91 (23)	2.42 (61)	2.97 (75)	3.16 (80)	3.29 (84)	2.12 (54)	1.59 (40)	1.29 (33)	0.52 (13)	0.48 (12)	19.75 (500)
Source 1: NOAA
Source 2: XMACIS (records & monthly max/mins)

== See also ==
- List of airports in South Dakota
