= Harrold Municipal Airport =

- IATA: none; ICAO: none; FAA LID: SD50

Summary
- Airport type: Public
- Owner: City of Harrold
- Serves: Harrold, South Dakota
- Elevation AMSL: 1,787 ft (545 m)
- Coordinates: 44°31′51″N 099°44′51″W
- Interactive map of Harrold Municipal Airport

Runways
Direction	Length		Surface
Direction	ft	m	Surface
15/33	2,250	686	Asphalt/turf

Statistics (2008)
- Aircraft operations: 5,750
- Sources: FAA, South Dakota DOT

Harrold Municipal Airport (FAA LID: SD50) is a city-owned, public-use airport located one nautical mile (1.85 km) northwest of the central business district of Harrold, in Hughes County, South Dakota, United States.

== Facilities and aircraft ==
Harrold Municipal Airport covers an area of 80 acres (32 ha) at an elevation of 1,787 feet (545 m) above mean sea level. It has one runway designated 15/33 with an asphalt and turf surface measuring 2,250 by 200 feet (686 x 61 m).

For the 12-month period ending September 29, 2008, the airport had 5,750 general aviation aircraft operations, an average of 15 per day.

== See also ==
- List of airports in South Dakota
