= Mitchell Municipal Airport =

Mitchell Municipal Airport Mitchell Army Airfield
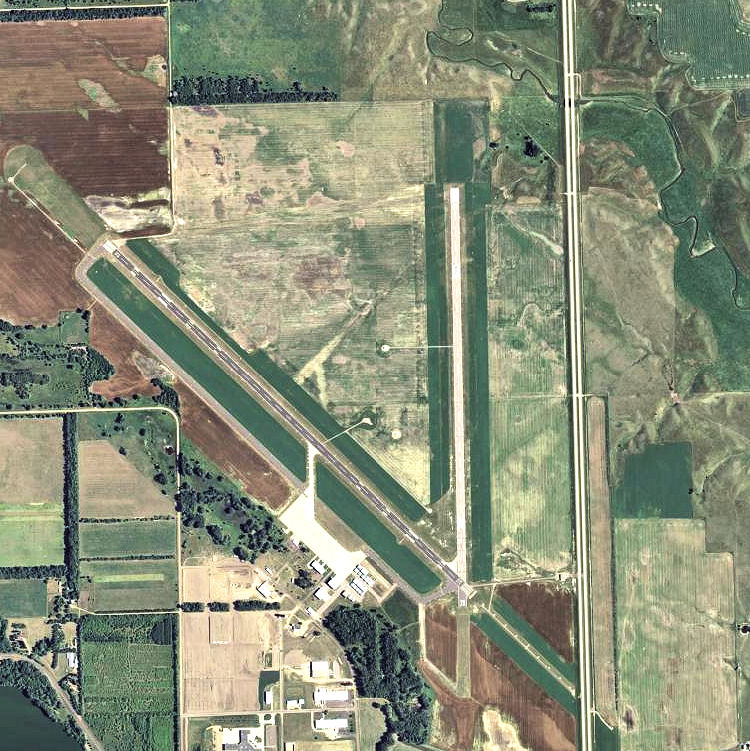
- USGS 2006 orthophoto
- IATA: MHE; ICAO: KMHE; FAA LID: MHE

Summary
- Airport type: Public
- Owner: City of Mitchell
- Serves: Mitchell, South Dakota
- Elevation AMSL: 1,304 ft / 397 m
- Coordinates: 43°46′29″N 098°02′19″W

Map

Runways
| Direction | Length | | Surface |
| Direction | ft | m | Surface |
|---|---|---|---|
| 12/30 | 6,700 | 2,042 | Asphalt |
| 17/35 | 5,513 | 1,680 | Asphalt |

Statistics (2011)
- Aircraft operations: 19,450
- Based aircraft: 29
- Source: Federal Aviation Administration

Mitchell Municipal Airport (IATA: MHE, ICAO: KMHE, FAA LID: MHE) is three miles north of Mitchell, in Davison County, South Dakota. The National Plan of Integrated Airport Systems for 2011–2015 categorized it as a general aviation airport.

== History ==
Opened in November 1937, the facility was rebuilt in 1943 by the United States Army Air Forces as a Second Air Force B-17 Flying Fortress and B-24 Liberator heavy bomber training airfield field known as Mitchell Army Airfield.

From July to late September 1943, the 700th Bomb Squadron of the 445th Bomb Group conducted their advanced training at Mitchell Army Airfield. Upon completion of training and subsequent notification for overseas deployment, the 700th Bomb Squadron flew to Lincoln Army Airfield for last minute aircraft modifications before taking the Southern Atlantic crossing route to Tibbenham, England.

On October 1, 1944, when training ended at the facility, it was transferred to Air Technical Service Command where it was assigned to Ogden Air Service Command as an auxiliary airfield. It was turned over to civil use after the war.

Airline flights began about 1951: Midwest Airlines Cessna 190s. Braniff stopped at Mitchell 1952–59; North Central arrived in 1959 and successor Republic left in 1982. (Northwest Airlink pulled out in 1991.)

== Facilities ==
The airport covers 1,376 acres (557 ha) at an elevation of 1,304 feet (397 m). It has two asphalt runways: 12/30 is 6,700 by 100 feet (2,042 x 30 m) and 17/35 is 5,513 by 100 feet (1,680 x 30 m).

In the year ending August 10, 2011, the airport had 19,450 aircraft operations, average 53 per day: 95% general aviation, 4% air taxi, and 1% military. 29 aircraft were then based at this airport: 79% single-engine and 21% multi-engine.

== See also ==
- List of airports in South Dakota
- South Dakota World War II Army Airfields
