= Clark County Airport =

Coordinates: 44°53′42″N 097°42′39″W

- IATA: none; ICAO: none; FAA LID: 8D7

Summary
- Airport type: Public
- Owner: County of Clark
- Serves: Clark, South Dakota
- Elevation AMSL: 1,793 ft (547 m)
- Interactive map of Clark County Airport

Runways
Direction	Length		Surface
Direction	ft	m	Surface
13/31	3,697	1,127	Asphalt
3/21	1,258	383	Turf

Statistics (2022)
- Aircraft operations (year ending 6/28/2022): 3,200
- Based aircraft: 18
- Source: Federal Aviation Administration

Clark County Airport (FAA LID: 8D7) is a county-owned public-use airport located two miles (3 km) northeast of the central business district of Clark, in Clark County, South Dakota, United States.

== Facilities and aircraft ==
Clark County Airport covers an area of 196 acres (79 ha) which contains two runways: 13/31 with a 3,697 x 60 ft (1,127 x 18 m) asphalt pavement and 3/21 with a 1,258 x 100 ft (383 x 30 m) turf surface. For the 12-month period ending June 28, 2022, the airport had 3,200 aircraft operations: 100% general aviation and <1% air taxi.

== See also ==
- List of airports in South Dakota
