= Mission Sioux Airport =

- IATA: none; ICAO: none; FAA LID: 0V6

Summary
- Airport type: Public
- Owner: Rosebud Sioux Tribe
- Serves: Mission, South Dakota
- Elevation AMSL: 2,605 ft / 794 m
- Coordinates: 43°18′25″N 100°37′41″W

Map
- Location of airport in South Dakota

Runways
Direction	Length		Surface
Direction	ft	m	Surface
11/29	3,200	975	Asphalt

Statistics (2009)
- Aircraft operations: 700
- Sources: FAA, South Dakota DOT

Mission Sioux Airport (FAA LID: 0V6) was a public use airport located two nautical miles (3.7 km) east of the central business district of Mission, a city in Todd County, South Dakota, United States. The airport is owned by the Rosebud Sioux Tribe.

On current aviation charts, the airport is depicted as closed, with the Rosebud Sioux Tribal Airport having replaced it in late 2010. The airport is no longer listed in the Airport/Facility Directory and the runway pavement is badly deteriorated.

== Facilities and aircraft ==
Mission Sioux Airport covers an area of 240 acres (97 ha) at an elevation of 2,605 feet (794 m) above mean sea level. It has one runway designated 11/29 with an asphalt surface measuring 3,200 by 60 feet (975 x 18 m).

For the 12-month period ending June 23, 2009, the airport had 700 general aviation aircraft operations, an average of 58 per month.
