= Dupree Municipal Airport =

Dupree Municipal Airport (CLOSED)
- IATA: none; ICAO: none; FAA LID: 7F2

Summary
- Airport type: Public
- Owner: Town of Dupree
- Serves: Dupree, South Dakota
- Elevation AMSL: 2,341 ft / 714 m
- Coordinates: 45°02′43″N 101°36′22″W
- Interactive map of Dupree Municipal Airport (CLOSED)

Runways
| Direction | Length | | Surface |
| Direction | ft | m | Surface |
|---|---|---|---|
| 14/32 | 2,400 | 732 | Turf |
- Source: Federal Aviation Administration

Dupree Municipal Airport (FAA LID: 7F2) was a public-use airport located in Dupree, a city in Ziebach County, South Dakota, United States. The City of Dupree decided to close the airport in 2010.

== Facilities and aircraft ==
Dupree Municipal Airport covered an area of 47 acres (19 ha) at an elevation of 2,341 feet (714 m) above mean sea level. It has one runway designated 14/32 with a turf surface measuring 2,400 by 200 feet (732 x 61 m).
