= Springfield Municipal Airport (South Dakota) =

- IATA: none; ICAO: none; FAA LID: Y03

Summary
- Airport type: Public
- Owner: City of Springfield
- Serves: Springfield, South Dakota
- Elevation AMSL: 1,324 ft / 404 m
- Coordinates: 42°52′48″N 097°54′04″W

Map
- Location of airport in South Dakota Y03 (the United States)

Runways
Direction	Length		Surface
Direction	ft	m	Surface
15/33	3,500	1,067	Asphalt
1/19	1,900	579	Turf

Statistics (2011)
- Aircraft operations: 4,166
- Based aircraft: 13
- Source: Federal Aviation Administration

Springfield Municipal Airport (FAA LID: Y03) is a city-owned, public-use airport located one nautical mile (2 km) north of the central business district of Springfield, a city in Bon Homme County, South Dakota, United States. It is included in the National Plan of Integrated Airport Systems for 2011–2015, which categorized it as a general aviation facility.

On August 10, 2019, the airport was renamed Springfield Municipal Airport, Lindeman Field, after Theodore Lindeman, a South Dakota native and WWII Navy pilot.

== Facilities and aircraft ==
Springfield Municipal Airport covers an area of 136 acres (55 ha) at an elevation of 1,324 feet (404 m) above mean sea level. It has two runways: 15/33 is 3,500 by 60 feet (1,067 x 18 m) with an asphalt surface and 1/19 is 1,900 by 100 feet (579 x 30 m) with a turf surface.

For the 12-month period ending September 29, 2011, the airport had 4,166 aircraft operations, an average of 11 per day: 99.9% general aviation and 0.1% air taxi. At that time there were 13 aircraft based at this airport: 92% single-engine and 8% helicopter.

== See also ==
- List of airports in South Dakota
