= Sturgis Municipal Airport (South Dakota) =

- IATA: none; ICAO: none; FAA LID: 49B

Summary
- Airport type: Public
- Owner: City of Sturgis
- Serves: Sturgis, South Dakota
- Elevation AMSL: 3,243 ft / 988 m
- Coordinates: 44°25′05″N 103°22′32″W
- Interactive map of Sturgis Municipal Airport

Runways
Direction	Length		Surface
Direction	ft	m	Surface
11/29	5,100	1,554	Concrete

Statistics (2016)
- Aircraft operations: 23,000
- Based aircraft: 46
- Source: Federal Aviation Administration

Sturgis Municipal Airport (FAA LID: 49B) is a city-owned public-use airport located 4 nautical miles (7.4 km) east of the central business district of Sturgis, a city in Meade County, South Dakota, United States. According to the FAA's National Plan of Integrated Airport Systems for 2009–2013, it is categorized as a general aviation facility.

== Facilities and aircraft ==
Sturgis Municipal Airport covers an area of 275 acres (111 ha) at an elevation of 3,243 feet (988 m) above mean sea level. It has one runway designated 11/29 with a concrete surface measuring 5,100 by 75 feet (1,554 m × 23 m).

For the 12-month period ending December 13, 2016, the airport recorded 36,000 aircraft operations, averaging 99 operations per day. Of these, 99 percent were classified as general aviation, while 2 percent were categorized as air taxi operations. At that time there were 46 aircraft based at this airport: 92 percent single-engine and 8 percent multi-engine.

== See also ==
- List of airports in South Dakota
