= MdN Interactive =

MdN Macintosh designers Network
- Editor: Kabushiki Kaisha MdN Corporation
- Categories: Design magazine / Mac magazine
- Frequency: Monthly
- Publisher: Impress Holdings
- Founded: 1989
- Company: Kabushiki Kaisha MdN Corporation
- Country: Japan
- Language: Japanese
- Website: MdN (in Japanese)

MdN (Macintosh designers Network) is a general information magazine for graphics and design. Despite its name, the magazine's emphasis is primarily on design and secondarily about Macintosh computing.

Founded in 1989 by Yuichi Inomata, the magazine was based on a Macintosh DTP support organisation. MdN also publishes other design magazines and mooks such as web creators and effects. The magazine is published by Impress Group company.

An English language version, MdN International, was published in Hong Kong for a period starting in 1993.
