= McIntosh Municipal Airport =

- IATA: none; ICAO: none; FAA LID: 8D6

Summary
- Airport type: Closed
- Owner: City of McIntosh
- Serves: McIntosh, South Dakota
- Elevation AMSL: 2,251 ft / 686 m
- Coordinates: 45°54′30″N 101°20′46″W

Map
- Location of airport in South Dakota

Runways
Direction	Length		Surface
Direction	ft	m	Surface
14/32	3,700	1,128	Turf/gravel

Statistics (2012)
- Aircraft operations: 14
- Source: Federal Aviation Administration

McIntosh Municipal Airport (FAA LID: 8D6) was a public use airport located one nautical mile (2 km) south of the central business district of McIntosh, a city in Corson County, South Dakota, United States. The airport property is owned by the City of McIntosh.

== Facilities and aircraft ==
McIntosh Municipal Airport covered an area of 66 acres (27 ha) at an elevation of 2,251 feet (686 m) above mean sea level. It had one runway designated 14/32 with a turf and gravel surface measuring 3,700 by 150 feet (1,128 x 46 m).

For the 12-month period ending September 25, 2012, the airport had 14 general aviation aircraft operations, an average of 1 per month.

The airport was closed in 2015 and the runway has since been removed.
