= South Dakota World War II Army Airfields =

South Dakota World War II Army Airfields
- Part of World War II
- Map Of South Dakota World War II Army Airfields

Site information
- Type: Army Airfields

Site history
- Built: 1940-1944
- In use: 1940-present

During World War II, the United States Army Air Forces (USAAF) established numerous airfields in South Dakota for training pilots and aircrews of USAAF fighters and bombers.

Most of these airfields were under the command of Second Air Force or the Army Air Forces Training Command (AAFTC). However the other USAAF support commands (Air Technical Service Command (ATSC); Air Transport Command (ATC) or Troop Carrier Command) commanded a significant number of airfields in a support roles.

It is still possible to find remnants of these wartime airfields. Many were converted into municipal airports, some were returned to agriculture and several were retained as United States Air Force installations and were front-line bases during the Cold War. Hundreds of the temporary buildings that were used survive today, and are being used for other purposes.

== Major Airfields ==
Air Technical Service Command

- Mitchell AAF/MAP, Mitchell

353d Army Air Force Base Unit (Det)
Now: Mitchell Municipal Airport (IATA: MHE, ICAO: KMHE)

- Pierre AAF, Pierre

353d Army Air Force Base Unit (Det)
Now: Pierre Regional Airport (IATA: PIR, ICAO: KPIR)

Second Air Force

- Rapid City AAB, Rapid City

353d Army Air Force Base Unit
Was: Rapid City Air Field (1947)
Was: Weaver Air Force Base (1948)
Was: Rapid City Air Force Base (1948-1953)
Now: Ellsworth Air Force Base (1953-Present)

- Sioux Falls AAF, Sioux Falls

335th Army Air Force Base Unit
Now: Sioux Falls Regional Airport / Joe Foss Field / Joe Foss Field Air National Guard Station (IATA: FSD, ICAO: KFSD)

Personnel Distribution Command

- Watertown AAF, Watertown

353d Army Air Force Base Unit (Det)
Now: Watertown Regional Airport (IATA: ATY, ICAO: KATY)

Army Air Force Training Command

- Aberdeen AAF, Aberdeen

Contract Flying School
Now: Aberdeen Regional Airport (IATA: ABR, ICAO: KABR)
