= Pine Ridge Airport =

- IATA: XPR; ICAO: KIEN; FAA LID: IEN

Summary
- Airport type: Public
- Owner: Oglala Sioux Tribe
- Serves: Pine Ridge, South Dakota
- Elevation AMSL: 3,333 ft / 1,016 m
- Coordinates: 43°01′21″N 102°30′40″W
- Interactive map of Pine Ridge Airport

Runways
Direction	Length		Surface
Direction	ft	m	Surface
12/30	5,000	1,524	Asphalt
6/24	3,003	915	Asphalt

Statistics (2008)
- Aircraft operations: 1,400
- Source: Federal Aviation Administration

Pine Ridge Airport (IATA: XPR, ICAO: KIEN, FAA LID: IEN) is a public use airport located two nautical miles (3.7 km) east of the central business district of Pine Ridge, in Oglala Lakota County, South Dakota, United States. The airport is owned by the Oglala Sioux Tribe, which has its tribal headquarters at Pine Ridge on the Pine Ridge Indian Reservation. According to the FAA's National Plan of Integrated Airport Systems for 2009–2013, it is categorized as a general aviation facility.

Although many U.S. airports use the same three-letter location identifier for the FAA and IATA, this facility is assigned IEN by the FAA and XPR by the IATA.

== Facilities and aircraft ==
Pine Ridge Airport covers an area of 315 acres (127 ha) at an elevation of 3,333 feet (1,016 m) above mean sea level. It has two asphalt paved runways: 12/30 is 5,000 by 60 feet (1,524 x 18 m) and 6/24 is 3,003 by 50 feet (915 x 15 m). For the 12-month period ending May 12, 2008, the airport had 1,400 general aviation aircraft operations, an average of 116 per month.

== See also ==
- List of airports in South Dakota
