= Wagner Municipal Airport =

Small airport serving Wagner, South Dakota

Coordinates: 43.0641°N 98.2928°W

Wagner Municipal Airport is a small municipally owned airport located to the south of Wagner, South Dakota. Its ICAO code is KAGZ.

== See also ==
- List of airports in South Dakota
