= Marv Skie–Lincoln County Airport =

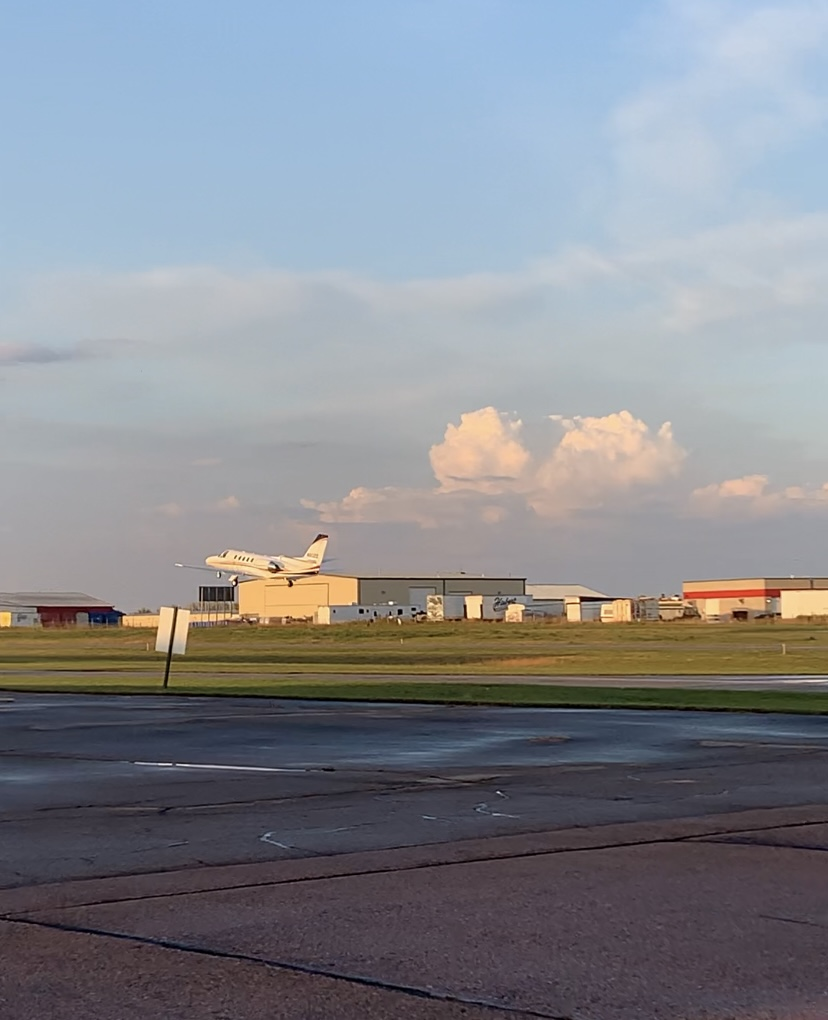
- IATA: none; ICAO: none; FAA LID: Y14

Summary
- Airport type: Public
- Owner: Lincoln County
- Serves: Tea, South Dakota
- Location: Lincoln County, South Dakota
- Elevation AMSL: 1,515 ft (462 m)
- Coordinates: 43°27′18″N 096°48′05″W

Map
- Location of airport in South Dakota Y14 (the United States)

Runways
Direction	Length		Surface
Direction	ft	m	Surface
16/34	3,650	1,113	Concrete

Statistics (2011)
- Aircraft operations: 40,860
- Based aircraft: 89
- Source: Federal Aviation Administration

Marv Skie–Lincoln County Airport (FAA LID: Y14) is a public use airport in Lincoln County, South Dakota, United States. It is owned by Lincoln County and located two nautical miles (4 km) northeast of the central business district of Tea, South Dakota. This airport is included in the National Plan of Integrated Airport Systems for 2011–2015, which categorized it as a general aviation facility.

== Background ==
The airport was named for Marvin A. Skie (1914–1997) of Lennox, Lincoln County.

== Facilities and aircraft ==
Marv Skie–Lincoln County Airport covers an area of 134 acres (54 ha) at an elevation of 1,515 feet (462 m) above mean sea level. It has one runway designated 16/34 with a concrete surface measuring 3,650 by 60 feet (1,113 x 18 m).

For the 12-month period ending September 28, 2011, the airport had 40,860 aircraft operations, an average of 111 per day: 99% general aviation and 1% air taxi. At that time there were 89 aircraft based at this airport: 98% single-engine and 2% multi-engine.

== See also ==
- List of airports in South Dakota
