= Mobridge Municipal Airport =

- IATA: MBG; ICAO: KMBG; FAA LID: MBG

Summary
- Airport type: Public
- Owner: City of Mobridge
- Serves: Mobridge, South Dakota
- Elevation AMSL: 1,716 ft / 523 m
- Coordinates: 45°32′47″N 100°24′23″W
- Interactive map of Mobridge Municipal Airport

Runways
Direction	Length		Surface
Direction	ft	m	Surface
12/30	4,410	1,344	Asphalt
17/35	2,399	731	Turf

Statistics (2010)
- Aircraft operations: 15,764
- Based aircraft: 11
- Source: Federal Aviation Administration

Mobridge Municipal Airport (IATA: MBG, ICAO: KMBG, FAA LID: MBG) is a city-owned public-use airport located one nautical mile (1.2 mi; 1.9 km) northeast of the central business district of Mobridge, a city in Walworth County, South Dakota, United States. It is included in the FAA's National Plan of Integrated Airport Systems for 2011–2015, which categorized it as a general aviation facility.

== Facilities and aircraft ==
Mobridge Municipal Airport covers an area of 300 acres (120 ha) at an elevation of 1,716 feet (523 m) above mean sea level. It has two runways: 12/30 is 4,410 by 75 feet (1,344 by 23 m) with an asphalt pavement and 17/35 is 2,399 by 250 feet (731 by 76 m) with a turf surface.

For the 12-month period ending June 28, 2010, the airport had 15,764 aircraft operations, an average of 43 per day: 98% general aviation, 2% air taxi, and <1% military. At that time there were 11 single-engine aircraft based at this airport.

== See also ==
- List of airports in South Dakota
