= Graham Field (stadium) =

Baseball park in Plano, Texas, US

Coordinates: 33.0269°N 96.8503°W

Graham Field is a baseball park located on the campus of Prestonwood Baptist Church in Plano, Texas, and was the home of the TCL Plano Blue Sox for the 2006 season. The team was one of the original members of the Texas Collegiate League as the Highland Park Blue Sox in 2004 and 2005 before moving to Plano. The main tenants of Graham Field are the Prestonwood Christian Academy Lions baseball team.
