= Graham Field (airport) =

Airport in South Dakota, United States of America

- IATA: none; ICAO: none; FAA LID: 7K7

Summary
- Airport type: Public
- Owner: McCook Industries
- Serves: North Sioux City, South Dakota
- Elevation AMSL: 1,106 ft (337 m)
- Coordinates: 42°32′25″N 096°29′06″W
- Interactive map of Graham Field

Runways
Direction	Length		Surface
Direction	ft	m	Surface
15/33	5,300	1,615	Concrete/turf

Statistics (2009)
- Aircraft operations: 324
- Source: Federal Aviation Administration

Graham Field (FAA LID: 7K7) is a privately owned public-use airport located one nautical mile (1.85 km) north of the central business district of North Sioux City, in Union County, South Dakota, United States.

== Facilities and aircraft ==
Graham Field covers an area of 320 acres (130 ha) at an elevation of 1,106 feet (337 m) above mean sea level. It has one runway designated 15/33 with a concrete and turf surface measuring 5,300 by 36 feet (1,615 x 11 m).

For the 12-month period ending August 18, 2009, the airport had 324 general aviation aircraft operations, an average of 27 per month.

== See also ==
- List of airports in South Dakota
