= Madison Municipal Airport (Georgia) =

- IATA: none; ICAO: none; FAA LID: 52A

Summary
- Airport type: Public
- Owner: City of Madison
- Serves: Madison, Georgia
- Elevation AMSL: 694 ft (212 m)
- Coordinates: 33°36′44″N 083°27′38″W

Map
- Location of airport in Georgia

Runways
| Direction | Length | | Surface |
| Direction | ft | m | Surface |
|---|---|---|---|
| 14/32 | 3,806 | 1,160 | Asphalt |

Statistics (2011)
- Aircraft operations: 4,700
- Based aircraft: 20
- Source: Federal Aviation Administration

Madison Municipal Airport (FAA LID: 52A) is a city-owned, public-use airport located two nautical miles (4 km) northeast of the central business district of Madison, a city in Morgan County, Georgia, United States. It is included in the National Plan of Integrated Airport Systems for 2011–2015, which categorized it as a general aviation facility.

== Facilities and aircraft ==
Madison Municipal Airport covers an area of 70 acres (28 ha) at an elevation of 694 feet (212 m) above mean sea level. It has one runway designated 14/32 with an asphalt surface measuring 3,806 by 75 feet (1,160 x 23 m).

For the 12-month period ending June 15, 2011, the airport had 4,700 aircraft operations, an average of 12 per day: 94% general aviation and 6% air taxi. At that time there were 20 aircraft based at this airport: 95% single-engine and 5% multi-engine.

== See also ==
- List of airports in Georgia (U.S. state)
