= Central Kentucky Regional Airport =

Central Kentucky Regional Airport (formerly Madison Airport)
- IATA: none; ICAO: none; FAA LID: RGA (formerly I39)

Summary
- Airport type: Public
- Owner: Madison Airport Board Inc.
- Serves: Richmond, Kentucky
- Elevation AMSL: 1,002 ft (305 m)
- Coordinates: 37°37′51″N 084°19′56″W
- Website: airport.madisoncountyky.us

Map
- Location of airport in Kentucky

Runways
| Direction | Length | | Surface |
| Direction | ft | m | Surface |
|---|---|---|---|
| 18/36 | 5,001 | 1,524 | Asphalt |

Statistics (2012)
- Aircraft operations: 31,270
- Based aircraft: 25
- Source: Federal Aviation Administration

Central Kentucky Regional Airport (formerly Madison Airport) (FAA LID: RGA (formerly I39)) is a public airport 9 miles (14 km) from Richmond, Kentucky, in Madison County, Kentucky. It is owned by the Madison Airport Board.

== Facilities and aircraft ==
Central Kentucky Regional Airport covers 197 acres (80 ha) at an elevation of 1,002 feet (305 m) above mean sea level. It has one asphalt runway, 18/36, 5,001 by 100 feet (1,524 x 30 m).

In the year ending August 2, 2012 the airport had 31,270 aircraft operations, average 85 per day: 94% general aviation, 5% air taxi, and 1% military. 25 aircraft were then based at this airport: 92% single-engine and 8% multi-engine.

== See also ==
- List of airports in Kentucky
