= KANM (Texas A&M University) =

Student radio station at Texas A&M University in College Station, Texas

KANM Student Radio (KAGZ-LP)
- College Station, Texas; United States
- Broadcast area: Bryan–College Station metropolitan area
- Frequency: 106.7 MHz

Programming
- Format: College radio, freeform

Ownership
- Owner: Texas A&M University

History
- Founded: 1973
- First air date: January 2026
- Former names: Texas A&M Student Government Radio
- Call sign meaning: Agz meaning Aggies

Technical information
- Licensing authority: FCC
- Facility ID: 788172
- Class: LP100
- ERP: 100 watts
- HAAT: 30 meters (98 ft)
- Transmitter coordinates: 30°37′48″N 96°20′34″W

Links
- Public license information: LMS
- Webcast: Listen live
- Website: kanm.tamu.edu

KANM Student Radio is the student-run free-format radio station at Texas A&M University, serving the Bryan-College Station metropolitan area. Broadcasting as "the college station of College Station", KANM's studio is located at the Memorial Student Center on the Texas A&M campus. It is broadcast as KAGZ-LP 106.7 from a transmitter site on the campus in College Station.

Founded in 1973 as Student Government Radio, KANM initiated its broadcasts as a cable radio station in partnership with a regional cable provider. Despite several relocations and financial setbacks in its early history, the station saw its local influence grow steadily throughout the late 1970s and 1980s. In the late 1990s, KANM began to transition to online platforms, becoming one of the first college radio stations to adopt Internet streaming audio in 1998. By the early 2000s, the station saw multiple technological updates, introducing streaming services and fully establishing itself as an online-only radio station by the mid-2010s. In 2024, KANM was granted an FCC low-power FM construction permit, which began broadcasting in January 2026 as KAGZ-LP 106.7.

KANM primarily emphasizes programming that showcases a variety mix, encompassing an array of music genres, including hip-hop, ambient, world music, indie rock, and punk, as well as talk shows, podcasts, and other content representative of the interests found within the student body. The station also organizes a bi-annual "Save the Music" event, a benefit concert aimed at promoting and supporting the music scene in the Bryan-College Station region.

== History ==
=== 1973–1983: Formation and initial hardships ===
If they want hard rock, country or whatever, that is what we will have. Once the program is on the air, surveys should indicate what the students [sic] the program should be.

— Student Radio Board member Steve Wakefield on programming content

In February 1973, the Texas A&M Student Government first conceptualized the establishment of a student-operated radio station at the university, recognizing both the availability of requisite funds and substantial enthusiasm within the student body. By October 8, 1973, (Note: The establishment date of KANM is subject to debate, with different sources providing varying accounts of its beginnings. According to some anecdotal evidence from alumni, a precursor to KANM might have been a commercial FM station named KBCS; this station was allegedly founded in 1971 by a member of the Texas A&M University Corps of Cadets. The account proposes that KBCS eventually transformed into the non-commercial, student-operated KANM; however, there exists no written reference to verify this.) the vision for KANM was actualized as Student Government Radio, an off-campus cable radio station managed by a five-member student board and set up in collaboration with the Mid-West Video Corporation, which provided essential office space and initial equipment. Broadcasting operated from 4 p.m. to 2 a.m. on weekdays on the 107.5 FM frequency via the Mid-West cable system, with its early programming showcasing a wide range of musical genres, including hard rock, bubblegum pop, and country.

From its inception, KANM perpetually faced challenges tied to inadequate funding, technical equipment shortcomings, and waning institutional support. The station was able to carve out a niche following throughout the mid-1970s, bolstered by the efforts of its disc jockeys, who not only showcased their passion for music but also launched various initiatives to amplify the station's presence and programming within the community, such as the curation of playlists in the university's student newspaper, The Battalion. Despite its popularity among the student population, KANM continued to struggle financially, accumulating a debt of $5,783.64; consequentially, under pressure from the Texas A&M Student Senate, the overseeing Student Radio Board committee disbanded in fall 1977, though the station still fell under the jurisdiction of the student government.

In September 1978, KANM experienced a temporary outage due to a cable connection problem caused by a change in its frequency from 89.1 to 99.9 FM and a shift from mono to stereo broadcasting, resuming operations in October. However, in December of the same year, the station suffered another outage due to an explosion that damaged the broadcasting dashboard; the station returned in the summer of 1979.

By 1980, KANM had finally established a physical presence on the Texas A&M campus at the B-2 lounge on the campus' north side. During this period, the station again grappled with recurring equipment malfunctions and problems related to cable connections, leading station manager Todd Gross to sever the station's affiliations with the student government and subsequently repositioning KANM as an independent student organization at Texas A&M. KANM moved once more in 1983, this time to the newly built Pavilion complex; alongside this transition, the station received a substantial equipment donation from KZZY, a radio station in San Antonio.

=== 1984–1989: Fundraising and attempts to switch to FM ===
During the mid-1980s, KANM found itself grappling with issues of inadequate funding and a perceived lack of institutional prioritization from the university. The station again faced financial struggles, exacerbated by high operational costs. In an effort to combat its situation, KANM spurred a variety of internal fundraising initiatives. On February 28, 1984, the station hosted its first benefit concert with the intent of raising funds for the organization. The station organized several more such events throughout the subsequent year, collectively raising approximately $1,700. In exploring further fundraising avenues, KANM introduced merchandise sales, offering items such as branded sunglasses and used vinyl records, and established sponsorships with local businesses.

All other major universities support their stations. Look at the University of Houston. It’s supported by their university and continues the alternative music format.

— Ginger Hudson, KANM DJ

Amid these challenges and opportunities, there were plans within KANM to transition from its existing cable setup to an FM radio broadcast dating to at least 1984. Still, financial constraints, particularly the funding required to supplement such a transition, remained a significant barrier to realizing this goal. However, in August 1988, the Department of Student Activities at Texas A&M provided a grant of an undisclosed amount to KANM, facilitating the station's effort to secure FM radio licensing from the FCC. In January 1989, KANM had been able to upgrade its broadcasting equipment in anticipation of the potential switch in broadcasting; by March 1989, an application had been in progress.

=== 1990–1999: FM licensing and introduction of online radio ===
The 1990s marked another phase of evolution for KANM. In 1992, the station relocated to the Student Services Building. This new space provided a suite of modern facilities, including separate rooms for office work, production, mixing, and a dedicated bathroom, apart from the primary studio.

An important development during this period was the pursuit of an FM license. Eric Truax, KANM's FM License Coordinator, led an effort by KANM students to apply for an FM license with the FCC as an independent student entity, Brazos Educational Radio, in the early 90s. This was due to reluctance from the university administration to hold another license and to ensure student independence. However, because of pushback from administration, and reluctance from some newer KANM students, they were forced off-campus, and this license became the foundation for a new community radio station, KEOS (89.1 FM).

Adapting to the evolving broadcasting landscape, KANM began exploring low-power AM broadcasting under Part 15 regulations. In 1998, this culminated in the station broadcasting on 1600 AM. That same year, acknowledging the rise of the internet, KANM initiated online streaming in RealAudio format. Additionally, in 1999, the station upgraded its equipment, procuring tools such as Technics SL-1200s, a Rane mixer, and Numark DJ CD players.

=== 2000–2016: Growth, transition to online radio, and temporary cease of operations ===
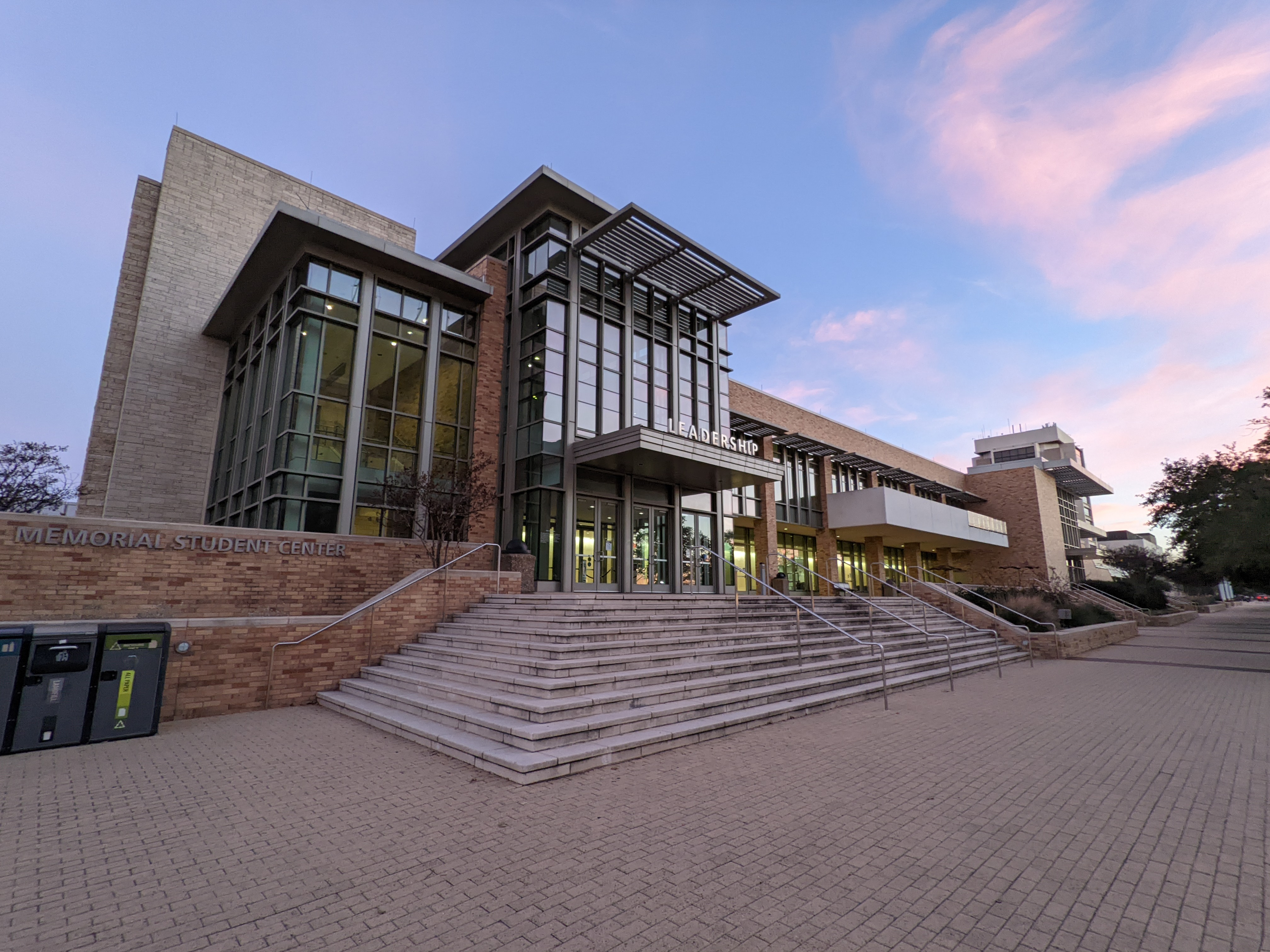
KANM relocated to the Memorial Student Center in 2001

In 2000, KANM acquired two Marantz PMD330 CD players. In August 2001, KANM underwent another location shift, moving from the Student Services Building to a vacant barbershop space in the Memorial Student Center to accommodate more offices. This move resulted in an increase in space, allowing the station to expand its office space and music library. In conjunction with the move, the station also undertook a reorganization of its entire music library's genre and categorization system. However, during the transition, several strategic planning oversights led to the absence of a production or mixing room.

In the same year, KANM overlooked an opportunity to apply for a low-power FM license due to financial constraints and a short application window. The transition from a free Real server to the more stable Shoutcast stream also took place in 2001. 2002 witnessed KANM switching frequencies to 1580 AM, moving away from WTAW's new frequency at 1620 AM. This was accompanied by a website overhaul, spearheaded by Kyle Hale, introducing features such as broadcast automation software for a live 24/7 playlist. The station also improved its audio streaming quality, increasing the Shoutcast stream quality to 192k in late 2002.

By 2003, KANM had invested in new equipment, including an Arrakis 2100SC console. However, it faced challenges like the destruction of the new console due to a power outage and the weakening and eventual death of the AM signal later in the year. Investigations revealed issues with the equipment setup, including an incorrect cable type used for the transmission line. The station managed to rectify these issues, and by fall 2004, KANM resumed broadcasting, this time on 1690AM.

In terms of equipment upgrades and space utilization after moving to the MSC, KANM significantly benefited from university surplus supplies, which provided a wide range of equipment and furniture. 2005 saw the shift of the cable FM broadcast studio to modulator link from leased lines to an audio-over-IP solution, resulting in significant cost savings and improved audio quality. That year also marked the acquisition of an Auditronics 212 console, replacing the older BE 350A console.

By fall 2006, KANM expanded its reach to campus cable TV, being available on campus cable channel 88.

In 2016, the station had to cease operations after being faced with outdated equipment, software issues, and the university's decision to discontinue certain software which rendered KANM's existing computers non-viable. Recognizing the cultural significance and impact of KANM, a grassroots initiative named "Save the Music" was launched by station alumni and supporters. This initiative aimed to raise awareness about the station's plight, gather financial support, and rally the community to help revive and sustain it. The funds from the "Save the Music" campaign, in conjunction with a grant and a partnership with Texas A&M's Student Activities Department, enabled the station to seek solutions for its technological challenges. However, despite attempts to address these issues, KANM was forced to temporarily suspend its operations in the spring of 2016.

=== 2017–2022: Revival and COVID-19 pandemic ===
In early 2017, after a two-semester hiatus, KANM resumed its operations, having undergone several transformations. With the incorporation of new software, the station transitioned to an enhanced online streaming format, moving away from its previous radio frequency. The updated format was devised to ensure cohesive, streamlined, and engaging broadcasts. Focusing on the preservation of indie music's essence, there was a noticeable shift to showcasing both popular and lesser-known tracks. Physical CDs, sourced from various labels and independent artists, played a significant role in curating the station's content, highlighting the continued relevance of tangible music mediums in an increasingly digital world. Another notable strategic shift for KANM during this period was the diversification of its content. While music remained central, there was a conscious decision to include news segments and interviews pertinent to the Texas A&M community. This broader content strategy was implemented with the aim of fostering greater awareness and engagement among the student population. In 2019, Save the Music was held again.

During the COVID-19 pandemic in 2020, KANM experienced difficulties in maintaining consistent programming and fundraising. However, in 2021, KANM resumed operations at full scale and revived the Save the Music event; the latter initiative was spurred by KANM's public relations director Gwen Howerton.

=== 2023–present: Low power FM license ===
In a time where media is slowly being consumed by, meaning bought out by corporations, the local radio station is dying, so the fact that A&M was willing to help us invest in ensuring that our student voices can be amplified in this time when so many universities are choosing to take the opposite route is an amazing investment in A&M students and alternative voices.

— Nayab Warach, Station Manager

In late 2023, KANM station managers Eren Rudd and Nayab Warach applied for an FCC low-power FM broadcasting construction permit. Unlike the attempt in the early 90s, KANM was able to obtain support from both the Student Media department and the Department of Communications and Journalism, allowing the station to apply under Texas A&M University's ownership. Texas A&M University was granted the construction permit for KANM in April 2024.

In February 2025, Texas A&M applied for and was granted the new callsign KAGZ-LP. Station construction began in the following months.

In January 2026, the station went on-air following a sign-on ceremony at the Texas A&M Liberal Arts and Arts & Humanities courtyard that included a ribbon-cutting ceremony and live DJs. The station's transmitter equipment is installed at the Hensel Park transmission site and is co-located with KAMU Public Broadcasting.

== Save the Music ==
KANM organizes a bi-annual benefit concert known as "Save the Music," primarily set at The 101 venue in Bryan since 2021. Introduced in 2016 as a response to potential suspension threats to the station, the event has evolved into a platform for emerging artists, focusing primarily on talents from the Bryan-College Station and broader East and Central Texas regions. The funds generated through Save the Music play a pivotal role in sustaining the radio station's operations, helping to organize more such events, and help to financially support local musicians.

The Save the Music concert, beyond its foundational role as a fundraiser, emerged as an essential cultural asset for the Bryan-College Station community. It acts as an alternative to the dominant country music narrative often associated with College Station, promoting diverse genres and providing a stage to indie and alternative acts such as Dirty Bynum, Sykotic Tendencies, and The Dead Meadows.

== Honors ==
College Broadcasters Inc. National Student Media Convention Award (2025):

- Best Social Media Presence – 4th Place

The International Student Broadcasting Championship (2024):

- Best Station Website – Winner
- Best Video Execution – Winner
- Best Sports Presenter – Runner-up
- Best Social Media Execution – Finalist
- Best Content Creator(s) – Finalist

== Notable alumni ==
- Alex Luke, former programming director and station manager
