= Madison Regional Airport =

- IATA: MDN; ICAO: KIMS; FAA LID: IMS

Summary
- Airport type: Public
- Owner: Madison BOAC
- Operator: City of Madison, Indiana
- Serves: Madison, Indiana
- Location: 3919 West IMS Lane, Madison, IN 47250
- Elevation AMSL: 819 ft / 250 m
- Coordinates: 38°45′35.7″N 85°27′52.9″W

Map
- Location in Indiana Location in United States

Runways
Direction	Length		Surface
Direction	ft	m	Surface
03/21	5,000	1,524	Asphalt

Statistics (2026)
- Based aircraft: 49
- Sources: Federal Aviation Administration; Indiana Department of Transportation

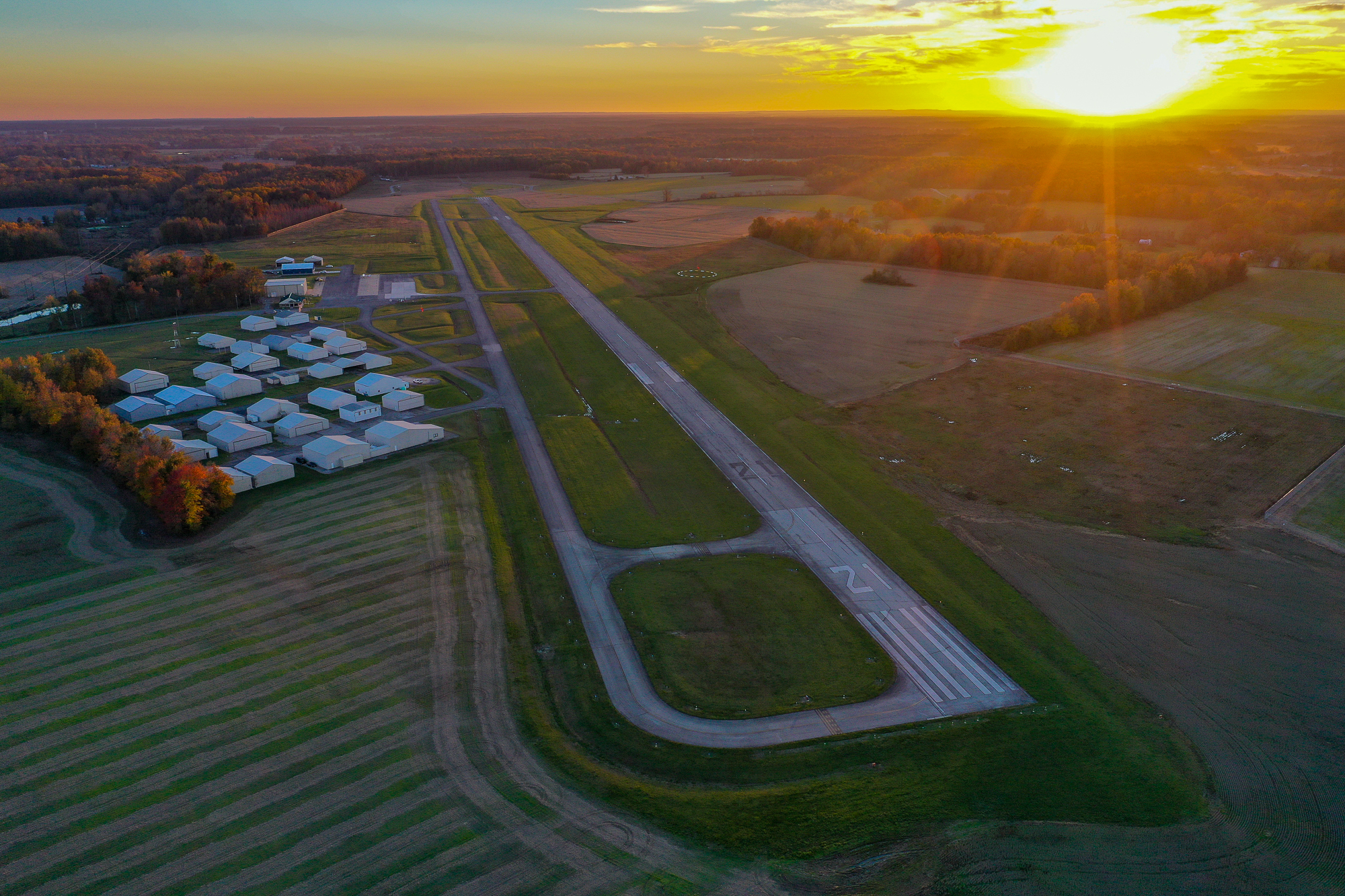

Madison Regional Airport (IATA: MDN, ICAO: KIMS, FAA LID: IMS) is a public-use airport located 4 nautical miles (7.4 km) west of Madison, Indiana, in Jefferson County, Indiana, United States.

== Facilities ==
Madison Regional Airport covers 385 acres (156 ha) and has one grooved asphalt runway, 03/21, measuring 5,000 ft × 75 ft (1,524 m × 23 m). According to the Federal Aviation Administration, the airport is home to 49 based aircraft. Planning data published by the Indiana Department of Transportation indicates the airport recorded approximately 16,885 aircraft operations in the most recent reporting year. Fuel services at the airport include 100LL and Jet A, and the facility supports a range of aeronautical services such as aircraft maintenance, flight instruction, air ambulance operations, agricultural aviation, and aircraft rental, as documented by the Federal Aviation Administration.
