= Madison Municipal Airport (South Dakota) =

Airport in Lake County, South Dakota, U.S.

- IATA: XMD; ICAO: KMDS; FAA LID: MDS

Summary
- Airport type: Public
- Owner: City of Madison
- Serves: Madison, South Dakota
- Elevation AMSL: 1,718 ft / 524 m
- Coordinates: 44°00′59″N 097°05′08″W
- Website: https://www.cityofmadisonsd.com/159/Airport?Type=B_BASIC&SEC={4B0FA4EF-BAF5-4C35-BD01-BA85F7334032

Map

Runways
Direction	Length		Surface
Direction	ft	m	Surface
15/33	5,000	1,524	Asphalt/concrete
3/21	2,380	725	Turf

Statistics (2023)
- Aircraft operations (year ending 4/18/2023): 37,895
- Based aircraft: 57
- Source: Federal Aviation Administration

Madison Municipal Airport (IATA: XMD, ICAO: KMDS, FAA LID: MDS) is a city-owned public use airport located one nautical mile (1.85 km) northeast of the central business district of Madison, a city in Lake County, South Dakota, United States. This airport is included in the FAA's National Plan of Integrated Airport Systems for 2009–2013, which categorized it as a general aviation facility.

Although many U.S. airports use the same three-letter location identifier for the FAA and IATA, this facility is assigned MDS by the FAA and XMD by the IATA (which assigned MDS to Middle Caicos Airport in the Turks and Caicos Islands).

== Facilities and aircraft ==
Madison Municipal Airport covers an area of 375 acres (152 ha) at an elevation of 1,718 feet (524 m) above mean sea level. It has two runways: 15/33 is 5,000 by 75 feet (1,524 x 23 m) with an asphalt and concrete surface; 3/21 is 2,380 by 200 feet (725 x 61 m) with a turf surface.

For the 12-month period ending April 18, 2023, the airport had 37,895 aircraft operations, an average of 104 per day: 100% general aviation and <1% air taxi. At that time there were 57 aircraft based at this airport: 48 single-engine, 5 multi-engine, 2 helicopter, and 2 glider.

== See also ==
- List of airports in South Dakota
