= Mississippi Delta =

Northwest section of the U.S. state of Mississippi

Coordinates: 33.8°N 90.4°W

Mississippi Delta – green line marks boundary

The Mississippi Delta, also known as the Yazoo–Mississippi Delta, or simply the Delta, is the northwest section of the U.S. state of Mississippi (and portions of Arkansas and Louisiana) that lies between the Mississippi and Yazoo rivers. The region has been called "The Most Southern Place on Earth" ("Southern" in the sense of "characteristic of its region, the American South") because of its racial, cultural, and economic history.

The Delta is 200 miles (320 km) long and 87 miles (140 km) across at its widest point, encompassing about 4.4 million acres (6,875 sq mi; 17,806 km^{2}) of alluvial floodplain. Originally covered in hardwood forest across the bottomlands, it was developed as one of the richest cotton-growing areas in the nation before the American Civil War (1861–1865). The region attracted many speculators who developed land along the riverfronts for cotton plantations; they became wealthy planters dependent on the labor of people they enslaved, who composed the vast majority of the population in these counties well before the Civil War, often twice the number of whites.

As the riverfront areas were developed first and railroads were slowly constructed, most of the delta's bottomlands remained undeveloped, even after the Civil War. Both Black and White migrants flowed into Mississippi, using their labor to clear land and sell timber in order to buy land. By the end of the 19th century, Black farmers made up two-thirds of the independent farmers in the Mississippi Delta.

In 1890, the white-dominated state legislature passed a new state constitution effectively disenfranchising most black people in the state. In the next three decades, most black people lost their lands due to tight credit and political oppression. African Americans had to resort to sharecropping and tenant farming to survive. Their political exclusion was maintained by the whites until after the gains of the civil rights movement in the 1960s.

Several counties in the region are still majority-Black, although more than 400,000 African Americans left the state during the Great Migration in the first half of the 20th century, moving to Northeastern, Midwestern, and Western industrial cities. As the agricultural economy does not support many jobs or businesses, the region has attempted to diversify. Lumbering is important and new crops such as soybeans have been cultivated in the area by the largest industrial farmers. At times, the region has suffered heavy flooding from the Mississippi River, notably in 1927 and 2011.

== Geography ==
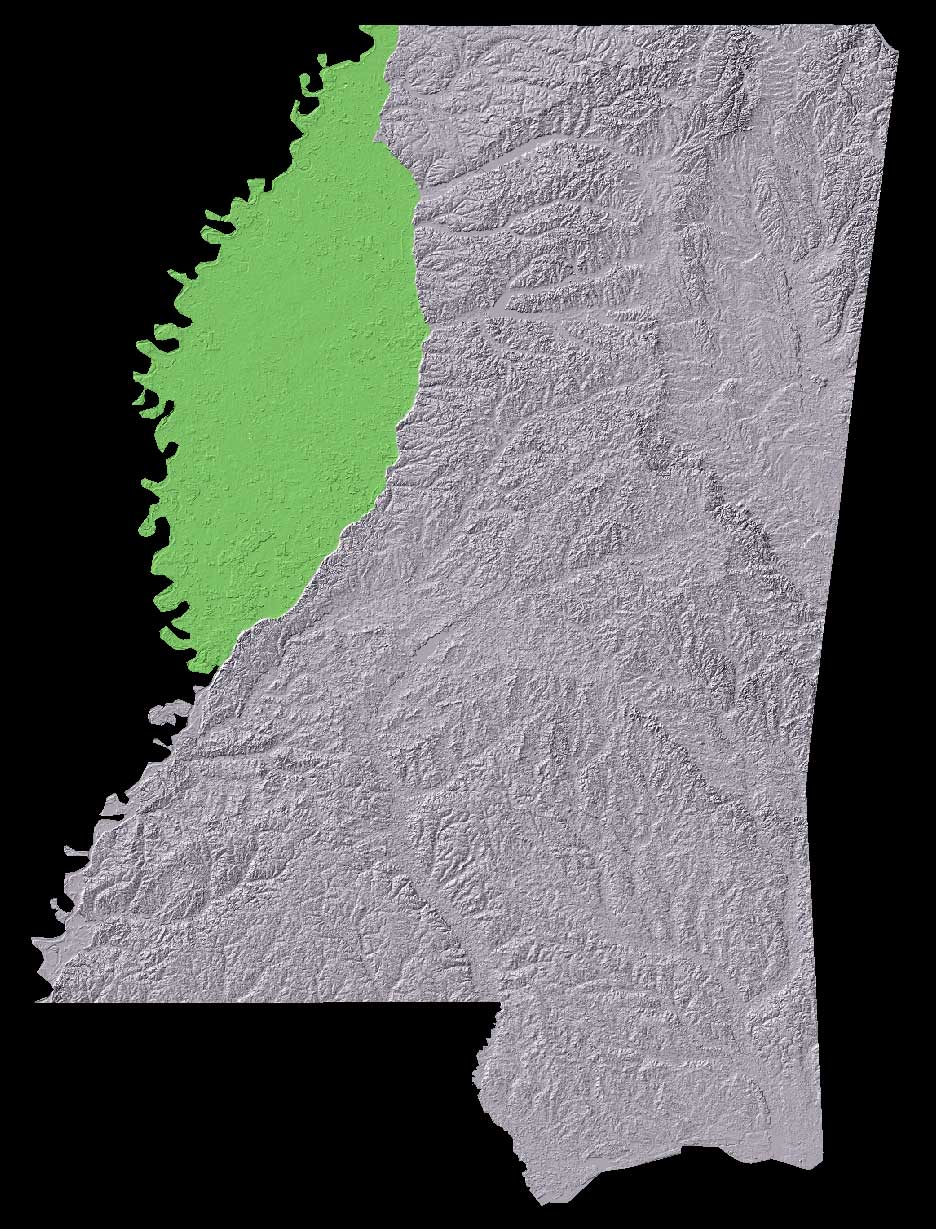
The shared flood plain of the Yazoo and Mississippi rivers

Despite the name, this region is not the delta of the Mississippi River. The shifting river delta at the mouth of the Mississippi on the Gulf Coast lies some 300 miles (480 km) south of this area in Louisiana, and is referred to as the Mississippi River Delta. Rather, the Mississippi Delta is part of an alluvial plain, created by regular flooding of the Mississippi and Yazoo rivers during prehistory era. The climate is humid subtropical, with short mild winters, and long, hot and wet summers.

The land is flat and contains some of the most fertile soil in the world as part of the Mississippi embayment. It is two hundred miles long and seventy miles across at its widest point, encompassing approximately 4,415,000 acres (1,787,000 ha), or, some 7,000 square miles of alluvial floodplain. On the east, it is bounded by bluffs extending beyond the Yazoo River.

The Delta includes all or part of the following counties: Washington, DeSoto (western portion), Humphreys, Carroll, Issaquena, Panola (western portion), Quitman, Bolivar, Coahoma, Leflore, Sunflower, Sharkey, Tate, Tunica, Tallahatchie, Holmes (western portion), Yazoo (western portion), Grenada (western portion), and Warren.

== Demographics ==
Mississippi Delta – Racial and ethnic composition Note: the US Census treats Hispanic/Latino as an ethnic category. This table excludes Latinos from the racial categories and assigns them to a separate category. Hispanics/Latinos may be of any race.
Race / Ethnicity (NH = Non-Hispanic)	Pop 2000	Pop 2010	Pop 2020	% 2000	% 2010	% 2020
White alone (NH)	269,917	267,084	241,358	48.10%	46.32%	43.11%
Black or African American alone (NH)	276,520	283,911	279,130	49.28%	49.23%	49.86%
Native American or Alaska Native alone (NH)	847	986	761	0.15%	0.17%	0.14%
Asian alone (NH)	2,454	3,862	4,803	0.44%	0.67%	0.86%
Native Hawaiian or Pacific Islander alone (NH)	92	142	164	0.02%	0.02%	0.03%
Other race alone (NH)	165	289	1,239	0.03%	0.05%	0.22%
Mixed race or Multiracial (NH)	2,708	4,510	14,108	0.48%	0.78%	2.52%
Hispanic or Latino (any race)	8,429	15,876	18,318	1.50%	2.75%	3.27%
Total	561,132	576,660	559,881	100.00%	100.00%	100.00%

Historical population
Census	Pop.	Note	%±
1880	388		—
1890	324		−16.5%
1900	285		−12.0%
1910	352		23.5%
1920	458		30.1%
1930	521		13.8%
1940	549		5.4%
1950	730		33.0%
1960	892		22.2%
1970	2,342		162.6%
1980	2,266		−3.2%
1990	1,969		−13.1%
2000	1,852		−5.9%
2010	1,712		−7.6%
2020	2,123		24.0%
U.S. Decennial Census

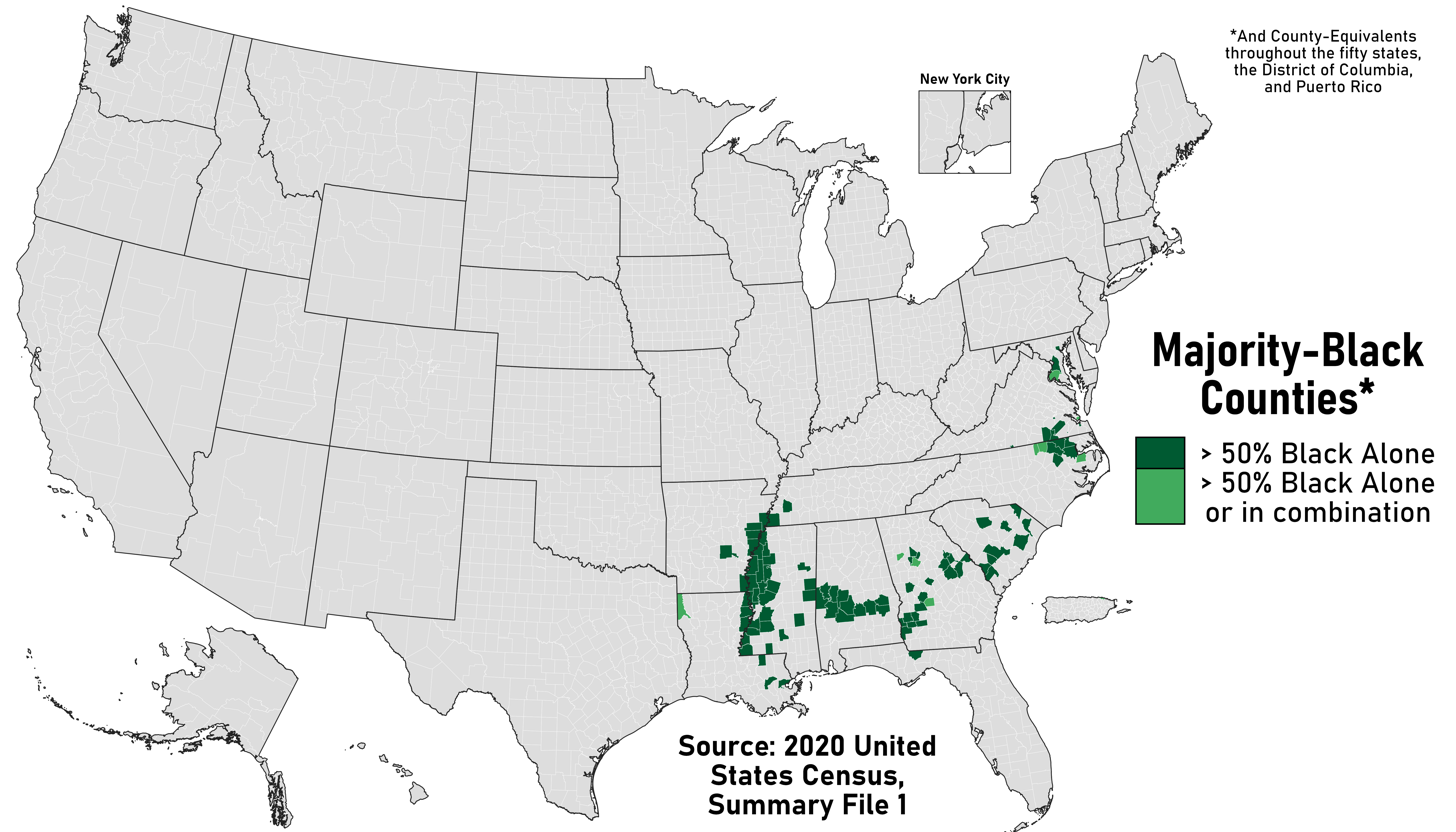
Majority-Black Counties in the U.S. as of the 2020 United States Census

In the 21st century, about one-third of Mississippi's African American population resides in the Delta, which has many black-majority state legislative districts. Much of the Delta is included in Mississippi's 2nd congressional district, represented by Democrat Bennie Thompson.

Chinese immigrants began settling in Bolivar County and other Delta counties as plantation workers in the 1870s, though most Delta Chinese families migrated to the state between the 1900s and 1930s. Most of these immigrants worked to leave the fields, becoming merchants in the small rural towns. As these have declined, along with other Delta residents ethnic Chinese have moved to cities or other states. Their descendants represent most of the ethnic Asian residents of the Delta recorded in censuses. While many descendants of the Delta Chinese have left the Delta, their population has increased in the state.

The Mississippi Delta received waves of immigration from three areas which have provided many of America's immigrants: China, Mexico, and Italy. The Italians of the Mississippi Delta brought with them elements of Italian cuisine to the region, and possibly most importantly, elements of Southern Italian music such as the mandolin, which became a part of the music of the Mississippi Delta Blues. Mexican immigrants to the Mississippi Delta greatly influenced the cuisine of the Mississippi Delta, leading to the development of one of the Delta's most famous culinary inventions, the Delta-style tamale, also known as the hot tamale.

== Agriculture and the Delta economy ==
=== Plantations ===
For more than two centuries, agriculture has been the mainstay of the Delta economy. Sugar cane and rice were introduced to the region by European settlers from the Caribbean in the 18th century. Sugar and rice production were centered in southern Louisiana, and later in the Arkansas Delta.

Early agriculture also included limited tobacco production in the Natchez area and indigo in the lower Mississippi. French yeomen settlers, supported by extensive families, had begun the back-breaking process of clearing the land to establish farms. European settlers in the region attempted to enslave local Native Americans for labor, though this proved unsuccessful as they frequently escaped. By the 18th century, the settlers had switched to importing enslaved Africans instead as a source of labor. In the early years of European colonization, enslaved African laborers brought critical knowledge and techniques for the cultivation and processing of both rice and indigo. Hundreds of thousands of Africans were captured, sold and transported as slaves from West Africa to North America.

The invention of the cotton gin in the late 18th century made profitable the cultivation of short-staple cotton. This type could not be grown in the upland areas of the South, leading to the rapid development of King Cotton throughout what became known as the Deep South. The demand for labor drove the domestic slave trade, and more than one million African American slaves were forced by sales into the South, taken in a forced migration from families in the Upper South. After continued European-American settlement in the area, congressional passage of the Indian Removal Act of 1830 extinguished Native American claims to these lands.

The Five Civilized Tribes and others were mostly removed west of the Mississippi River, and European-American settlement expanded at a rapid rate in Georgia, Alabama, Mississippi, Louisiana and Texas. In the areas of greatest cotton cultivation, whites were far outnumbered by their slaves.

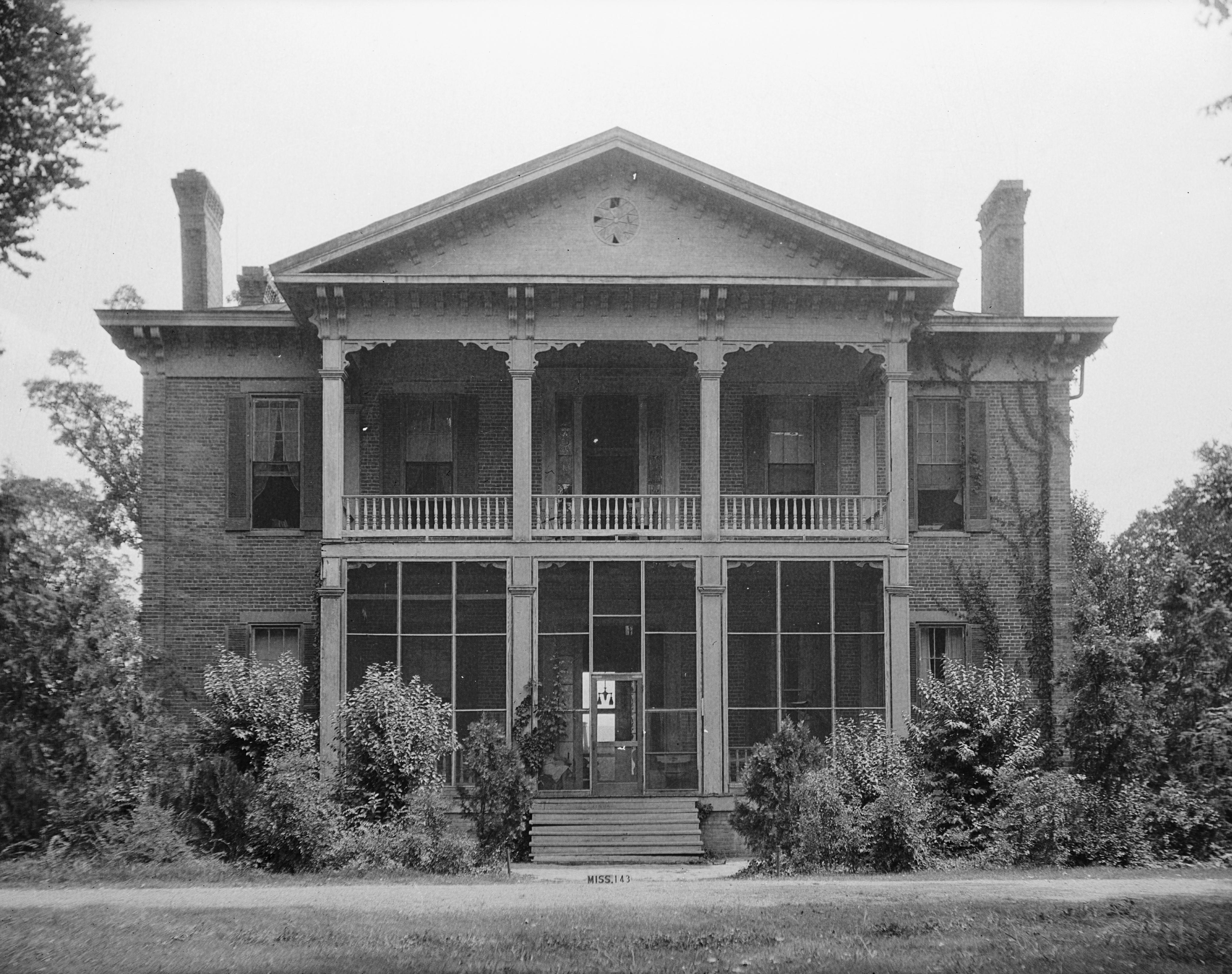
Belmont Plantation in Wayside, Mississippi.

Many slaves were transported to Delta towns by riverboat from slave markets in New Orleans, which became the fourth largest city in the country by 1840. Other slaves were transported downriver from slave markets at Memphis and Louisville. Still others were transported by sea in the coastwise slave trade. By this time, slavery had long been established as a racial caste. African Americans for generations worked the commodity plantations, which they made extremely profitable. In the opinion of Jefferson Davis, typical of that of Mississippian whites of his day, Africans being held in slavery reflected the will of Providence, as it led to their Christianizing and to the improvement of their condition, compared to what it would have been had they remained in Africa. According to Davis, the Africans "increased from a few unprofitable savages to millions of efficient Christian laborers".

By the early 19th century, cotton had become the Delta's premier crop, for which there was high international demand. Mills in New England and New York also demanded cotton for their industry, and New York City was closely tied to the cotton trade. Many southern planters traveled so frequently there for business that they had favorite hotels. From 1822 cotton-related exports comprised half of all exports from the port of New York City. In 1861 Democratic mayor Fernando Wood called for secession of New York City because of its close business ties to the South. Eventually the city joined the state in supporting the war, but immigrants resented having to fight when the wealthy could buy their way out of military service.

Comparing cotton's preeminence then to that of oil today, Historian Sven Beckert called the Delta "a kind of Saudi Arabia of the early nineteenth century".

Demand for cotton remained high until well after the American Civil War, even in an era of falling cotton prices. Though cotton planters believed that the alluvial soils of the region would always renew, the agricultural boom from the 1830s to the late 1850s caused extensive soil exhaustion and erosion. Lacking agricultural knowledge, planters continued to raise cotton the same way after the Civil War. Plantations before the war were generally developed on ridges near the rivers, which were used for transportation of products to market. Most of the territory of Mississippi was still considered wilderness, needing substantial new population. These areas were covered in a heavy dense growth of trees, bushes and vines.

Following the Civil War, 90 percent of the bottomlands in Mississippi were still undeveloped. The state attracted thousands of migrants to its frontier. They could trade their labor in clearing the land to eventually purchase it from their sale of lumber. Tens of thousands of new settlers, both Black and White, were drawn to the area. By the end of the century, two-thirds of the independent farmers in the Mississippi Delta were Black. But, the extended low price of cotton had caused many to go deeply into debt, and gradually they had to sell off their lands, as they had a harder time getting credit than did White farmers. From 1910 to 1920, the first and second generations of African Americans after slavery lost their stake in the land. They had to resort to sharecropping and tenant farming to survive.

Sharecropping and tenant farming replaced the slave-dependent plantation system. African American families retained some autonomy, rather than working on gangs of laborers. As many were illiterate, they were often taken advantage of by the planters' accounting. The number of lynchings of Black men rose in the region at the time of settling accounts, and researchers have also found a correlation of lynchings to years that were poor economically for the region.

The sharecropping and tenant system, with each family making its own decisions, inhibited the use of progressive agricultural techniques in the region. In the late 19th century, the clearing and drainage of wetlands, especially in Arkansas and the Missouri Bootheel, increased lands available for tenant farming and sharecropping.

Planters needed workers and recruited Italians and Chinese workers in the 19th century to satisfy demand. They quickly moved out of field labor, saving money as communities in order to establish themselves as merchants, often in the small rural towns.

=== Mechanization and migration ===
During the 1920s and 1930s, in the aftermath of the increasing mechanization of Delta farms that reduced the need for labor, displaced whites and African Americans began to leave the land and move to towns and cities. Tens of thousands of Black laborers left the Jim Crow south for better opportunities in the Northeast and Midwest in the Great Migration, settling in cities such as St. Louis, Chicago, Cleveland, and New York City. It was not until the Great Depression years of the 1930s and later that large-scale farm mechanization came to the region. The mechanization of agriculture and the availability of domestic work outside the Delta spurred the migration of Delta residents from the region. Farming was unable to absorb the available labor force, and entire families moved together, many going north on the railroad to Chicago. People from the same towns often settled near each other.

The view that mechanization sparked the Great Migration—both Black and White—has been challenged by two of the most prominent recent chroniclers of the event. Isabel Wilkerson characterizes the migration as a flight for freedom from the political terror of lynchings and the hardening of Jim Crow restrictions on Black freedom: "They did what human beings looking for freedom, throughout history, have often done. They left."

Nicholas Lemann notes the onset of the Great Migration coincided with the passage of immigration restrictions that throttled the supply of immigrants who had been willing to take the worst of the jobs of the industrial North, which was relatively free of the suffocating breadth of Jim Crow. Further, Lemann wrote, "it was undeniable that the economic opportunity [in the North] was vastly greater; that moment in the Black rural South was one of the few in American history when virtually every member of a large class of people was guaranteed an immediate quadrupling of income, at least, by simply relocating to a place that was only a long day's journey away."

In this view, Southern Blacks were the agents of the Great Migration and not passive objects. Instead, they actively fled oppression and sought freedom, especially in the years between World War I and World War II. A slow mechanization of Delta agriculture during the first phase of the Great Migration was the effect of the migration of a workforce, not its cause. It was not until the mid-1940s that the doctrine of White supremacy demanded that Blacks be displaced. By that time, Lemann writes, Delta Whites feared socio-political changes that might be forced on the Delta by the Roosevelt Democratic coalition and the pressure of returning WWII veterans; the Delta was three-quarters Black, so their voting potential was huge. As Delta native Aaron Henry, who was born in 1922, put it, "They wished we'd go back to Africa, but Chicago was close enough."

From the late 1930s through the 1950s, the Delta enjoyed an agriculture boom, as wartime needs followed by reconstruction in Europe and Japan expanded the demand for the Delta region's farm products. As the mechanization of agriculture continued, women left fieldwork and went into service work, while the men drove tractors and worked on the farms. From the 1960s through the 1990s, thousands of small farms and dwellings in the Delta region were absorbed by large corporate-owned agribusinesses, and the smallest Delta communities have stagnated. One company that served the agricultural industry in the region was an aerial crop dusting service that eventually became Delta Air Lines, which is currently a major U.S. based passenger air carrier.

Since the late 20th century, lower Delta agriculture has increasingly been dominated by families and nonresident corporate entities that hold large landholdings. Their operations are heavily mechanized with low labor costs. Such farm entities are capital-intensive, where hundreds and thousands of acres are used to produce market-driven crops such as cotton, sugar, rice, and soybeans.

=== Diversification ===
Remnants of the region's agrarian heritage are scattered along the highways and byways of the lower Delta. Larger communities have survived by fostering economic development in education, government, and medicine. Other endeavors such as catfish, poultry, rice, corn, and soybean farming have assumed greater importance. Today, the monetary value of these crops rivals that of cotton production in the lower Delta. Shifts away from the river as a main transportation and trading route to railroads and, more significantly, highways, have left the river cities struggling for new roles and businesses.

Due to the growth of the automobile industry in the South, many parts suppliers have opened facilities in the Delta (as well as on the Arkansas Delta side of the Mississippi River, another area of high poverty). The 1990s state legalization of casino gambling in Mississippi has boosted the Delta's economy, particularly in the areas of Tunica and Vicksburg.

A large cultural influence in the region is its history of hunting and fishing. Hunting in the Delta is primarily for game such as whitetail deer, wild turkey, and waterfowl, along with many small game species (squirrel, rabbit, dove, quail, raccoon, etc.) For many years, the hunting and fishing have also attracted visitors in the regional tourism economy. The Delta is one of the top waterfowl destinations in the world because it is in the middle of the Mississippi Flyway (the largest of all the migratory bird routes in America).

== Political environment ==
Delta politics was dominated by upscale plantation owning Democrats during the post-Civil War era, though areas of resistance from blacks and poor whites remained throughout the era. Some of these Southern Democrats resorted to using fraud, violence, and intimidation to regain control of the state legislature in the late 19th century. Civic groups such as the Red Shirts in Mississippi were active against Republicans and blacks, sometimes using violence to suppress their voting for state candidates. But many blacks continued to be elected to local offices, and there was a biracial coalition between Republicans and Populists that briefly gained state power in the late 1880s. To prevent this from happening again, in 1890 the Mississippi state legislature passed a new constitution which effectively disenfranchised most blacks by use of such devices as poll taxes and literacy tests, which withstood court challenges. Unable to vote, they could not participate on juries. The state then passed legislation to impose racial segregation and other aspects of Jim Crow.

This system of oppression was maintained with violence and economic boycotts into the years of increasing activism for civil rights, as blacks worked to regain their constitutional rights as citizens. The Delta counties were sites of fierce and violent resistance to change, with blacks murdered for trying to register to vote or to use public facilities. African Americans were not able to exercise their constitutional rights again until the civil rights movement led to the passage of the Voting Rights Act of 1965.

== Culture ==
=== Music ===
The Delta is strongly associated as the place where several genres of popular music originated, including Delta blues and rock and roll. The mostly Black sharecroppers and tenant farmers had lives marked by poverty and hardship—where in which they expressed their struggles with and through their identity's unique sway; they created music that became the beat, rhythm, and songs of cities and a nation.

Gussow (2010) examines the conflict between blues musicians and Black ministers in the region between 1920 and 1942. The ministers condemned blues music as "devil's music". In response, some blues musicians satirized preachers in their music, as for example in the song, "He Calls That Religion", by the blues group Mississippi Sheiks. The lyrics accused Black ministers of engaging in and fomenting sinful behavior. The Black residents were poor, and the musicians and ministers competed for their money. The Great Migration to northern cities, beginning before World War I, seriously depleted Black communities and churches, but the musicians sparked off each other in the industrial cities, with blues in Chicago and St. Louis.

=== Festivals ===
Following is a list of various festivals in the Delta:

February

- Mississippi River Marathon (Greenville)
- Stafford's Lawn Mower Mardi Gras Parade (Drew)

March

- Italian Festival of Mississippi (Cleveland)

April

- Rivergate Festival (Tunica)
- World Catfish Festival (Belzoni)
- Leland Crawfish Festival (Leland)
- Crosstie Arts & Jazz Festival (Cleveland)
- Juke Joint Festival (Clarksdale)
- Riverfest (Vicksburg)
- Dragon Boat Festival (Greenville)

May

- Dermott Crawfish Festival (Dermott, AR)
- Deep Delta Festival (Rolling Fork)
- River to the Rails Festival (Greenwood)
- Mainstream Arts & Crafts Festival (Greenville)
- Summerfest (Hollandale)
- Showfest (Tunica) As of 2010
- Webb Day Festival (Webb)

June

- B.B. King Homecoming Festival (Indianola)
- Highway 61 Blues Festival (Leland)
- Delta Jubilee (Clarksdale)

July

- First Friday Jazz Festival (Greenville)

August

- Sunflower River Blues Festival (Clarksdale)

September

- September Festival (Mound Bayou)
- Delta Air and Balloon Festival (Greenwood)
- Mississippi Delta Blues and Heritage Festival (Greenville)
- Charleston Day Reunion (Charleston)
- Gateway To The Delta Festival (Charleston)
- Delta State University Pig Pickin' (Cleveland)

October

- Great Delta Bear Affair
- Octoberfest (Cleveland)
- The Great Ruleville Roast
- The King Biscuit Blues Festival (Helena, AR)
- Frog Fest (Leland)
- Mighty Mississippi Music Festival (Greenville)
- Delta Hot Tamale Festival (Greenville)
- Delta Fest (Shaw)
- Delta Wings Festival and MS State Duck Calling & Duck Gumbo Championships (Drew)

November

- Electroacoustic Juke Joint (Cleveland)

December

- Roy Martin Delta Band Festival (Greenwood)

=== Food ===
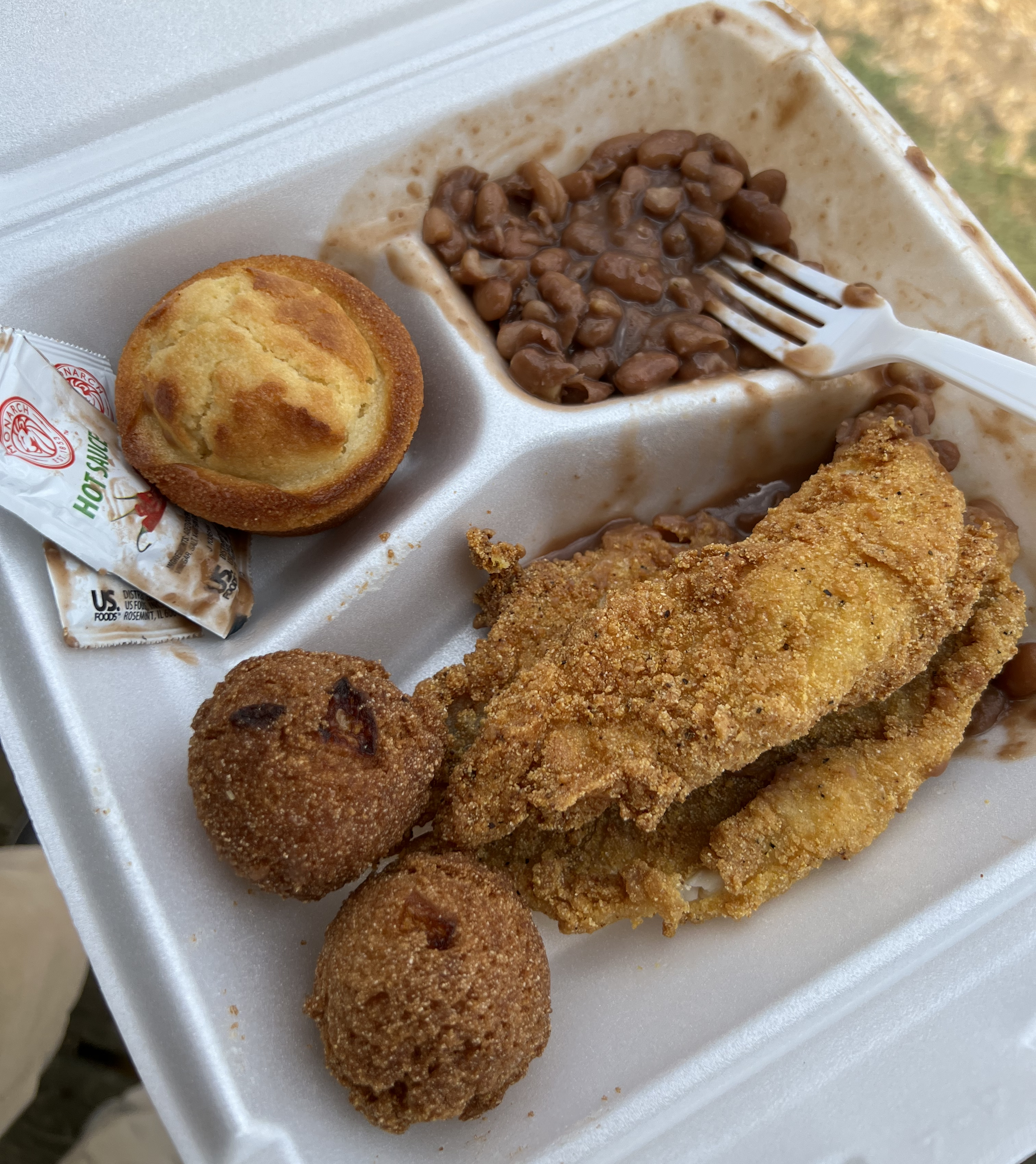
A typical meal of fried catfish filets paired with hushpuppies, pinto beans, cornbread, and hot sauce.

Hot tamales are a Delta-endemic derivation of the tamale. It is up for debate as to their origins, but it is strongly suggested they arrived in the Delta with migrant Mexican laborers in the early twentieth century and are attested to around that time period in blues music centering around the dish. While their most common filling is pork they differ from the traditional tamale in that they are made from corn meal rather than masa and boiled rather than steamed. Today the dish is associated mainly with African American chefs despite originating from different cultural foodways.

Fried Catfish is a staple of the Mississippi Delta. There exist a number of catfish farms throughout the region which supply fresh and local fish to kitchens across the Delta. The meal consists of catfish filets which are breaded and fried. Many sides exist for the dish and are nonessential. One such side, hushpuppies, is common to fried catfish plates in the Delta.

Chow Mein arrived to the Delta as it did in many different parts of the United States, with Chinese immigrants arriving around the turn of the century.

Hoover Sauce is a twist on traditional Cantonese duck sauce introduced by the Hoover family in the mid-20th century. The sauce is usually served with meat such as locally hunted duck or steak. It is unique to the Delta.

Soul food is broadly sold and cooked throughout the Delta. The region's large African American population and historical roots make this cuisine of the Delta's truly endemic food traditions. Many dishes such as fried okra, mashed potatoes, black-eyed peas, fried chicken, cornbread, and others are associated with soul food in the Delta.

=== Encompassed towns ===
- Anguilla
- Belzoni
- Charleston
- Clarksdale
- Cleveland
- Cruger
- Drew
- Greenville
- Greenwood
- Gunnison
- Holcomb
- Hollandale
- Indianola
- Itta Bena
- Leland
- Marks
- Mayersville
- Moorhead
- Mound Bayou
- Rolling Fork
- Rosedale
- Ruleville
- Shaw
- Shelby
- Tchula
- Tippo
- Tunica
- Vicksburg
- Winterville
- Yazoo City

== Government and infrastructure ==
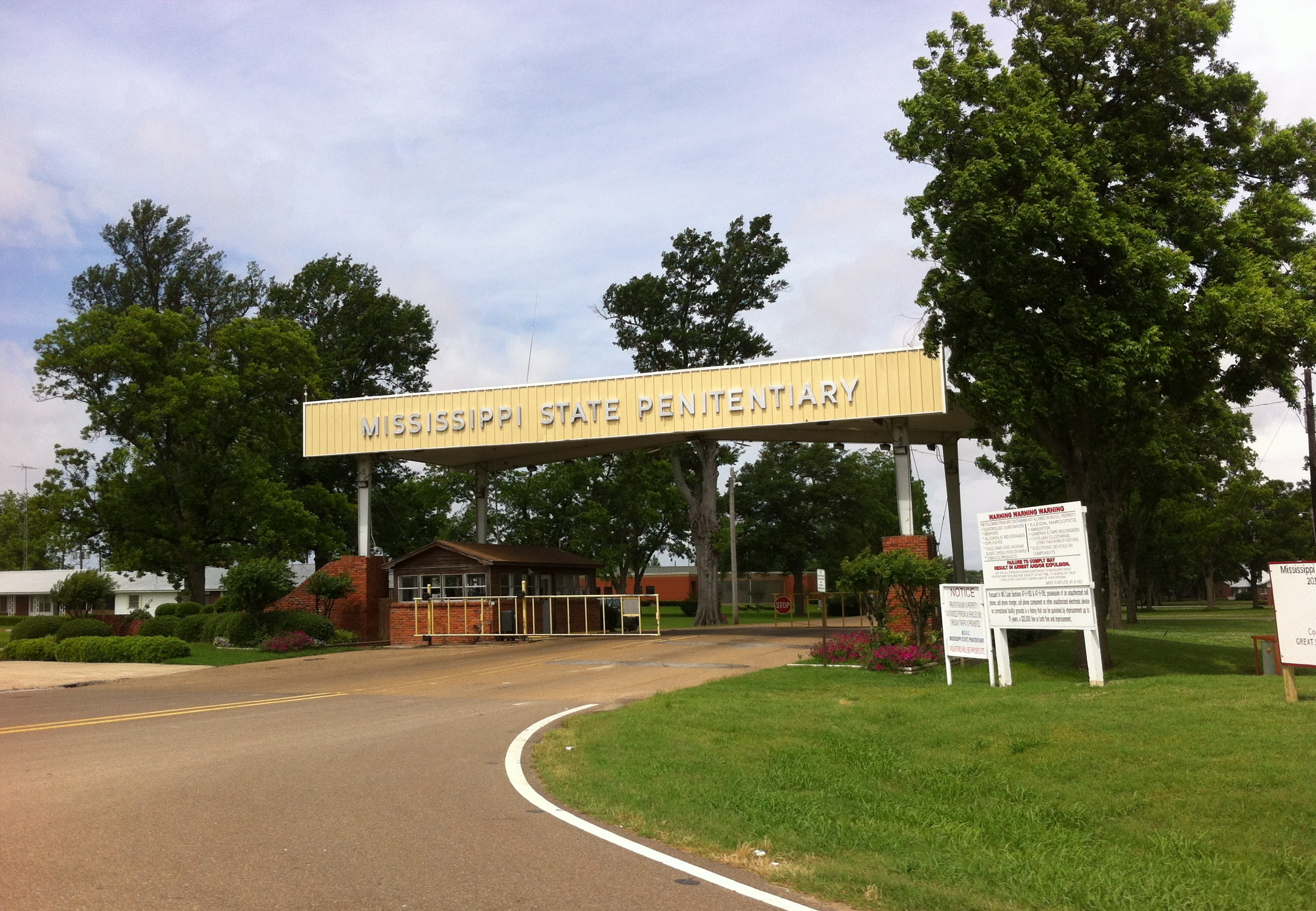
Mississippi State Penitentiary

The Mississippi Department of Corrections operates the Mississippi State Penitentiary (Parchman, MSP) in unincorporated Sunflower County, within the Mississippi Delta. John Buntin of Governing magazine said that MSP "has long cast its shadow over the Mississippi Delta, including my hometown of Greenville, Mississippi".

== Education ==
=== Universities ===
- Delta State University
- Mississippi Valley State University

=== Community colleges ===
- Coahoma Community College
- Mississippi Delta Community College

=== Primary and secondary schools ===
As of 2005, the majority of students in public schools in the Mississippi Delta are Black, and the majority of private school students are White. This de facto racial segregation is related in part to economics, as few African American parents in the poor region can pay to send their children to private schools. Suzanne Eckes of The Journal of Negro Education wrote, "Although de facto segregation in schools exists throughout the country, the de facto segregation that exists in the Mississippi Delta region is somewhat unique."

During the years of segregation, public school systems did not know how to classify the minority Chinese students, initially requiring them to attend schools with blacks. Their socioeconomic status affected their classification and, as their parents became merchants and filed legal suits, in some areas they gained entrance for their children to White schools, before the schools were integrated beginning in the late 1960s.

== Media and publishing ==
Newspapers, magazines and journals

- Belzoni Banner (published weekly)
- Deer Creek Pilot (published weekly)
- Delta Magazine (published bi-monthly)
- Delta Business Journal (published monthly)
- Clarksdale Press Register (published daily)
- Cleveland Bolivar Commercial (published daily)
- Greenville Delta Democrat Times (published daily)
- Greenwood Commonwealth (published daily)
- The Leland Progress (published weekly)
- The Enterprise-Tocsin (published weekly)
- The Tunica Times (published weekly)

Television

- WABG (Greenwood)
- WFXW (Greenville)
- WXVT-LD (Cleveland)
- WNBD-LD (Grenada)

The Northern Delta is also served by The Commercial Appeal and The Daily News newspapers based in Memphis, Tennessee, plus several radio and TV stations also based there.

The Clarion-Ledger, based in Jackson, covers events in the Delta.

== Transportation ==
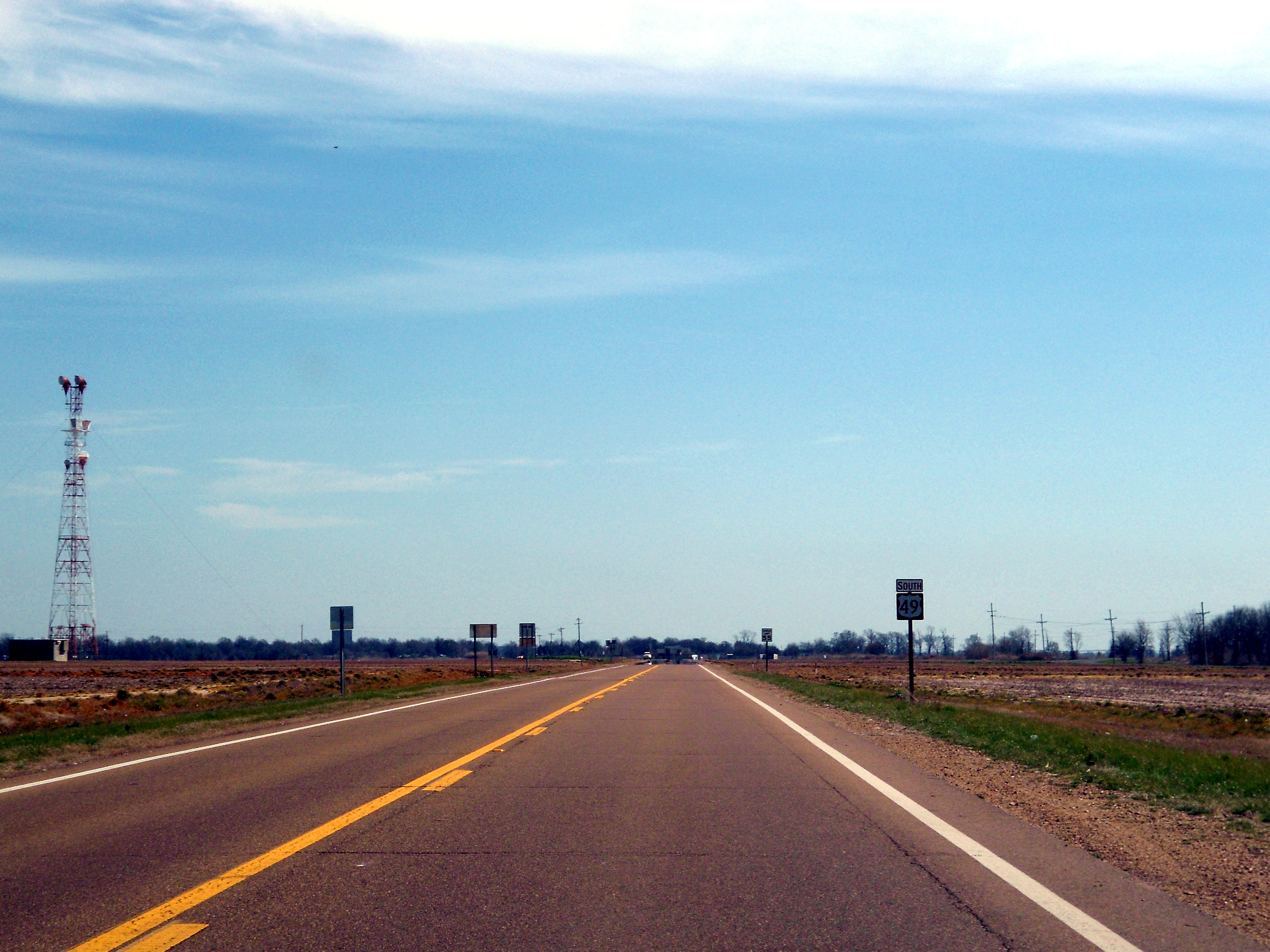
US 49 runs through the Mississippi Delta.

Air transportation

- Tunica Municipal Airport (Tunica)
- Mid Delta Regional Airport (Greenville)
- Greenwood-Leflore Airport (Greenwood)
- Cleveland Municipal Airport (Cleveland)
- Indianola Municipal Airport (Indianola)
- Yazoo County Airport (Yazoo City)
- Fletcher Field Airport (Clarksdale)
- Ruleville-Drew Airport (Drew and Ruleville)

Highways

- U.S. Route 82 runs from Alamogordo, New Mexico to Brunswick, Georgia
- U.S. Route 278 runs from Wickes, Arkansas to Hilton Head Island, South Carolina
- U.S. Route 49 runs from Piggott, Arkansas to Gulfport, Mississippi
- U.S. Route 61 runs from Wyoming, Minnesota to New Orleans, Louisiana

Passenger rail

- Amtrak's City of New Orleans route serves three Delta cities, Yazoo City, Greenwood, and Marks.

== See also ==
- Delta Regional Authority
- Far East Deep South
- Finding Cleveland
- History of Mississippi
- Joseph S. Clark's and Robert F. Kennedy's tour of the Mississippi Delta
- Mississippi Alluvial Plain
- Mississippi Plan
- Undiscovered Genius of the Mississippi Delta
- Mississippi Delta National Heritage Area
