= Greenville Air Force Base (Mississippi) =

Former US Air Force base

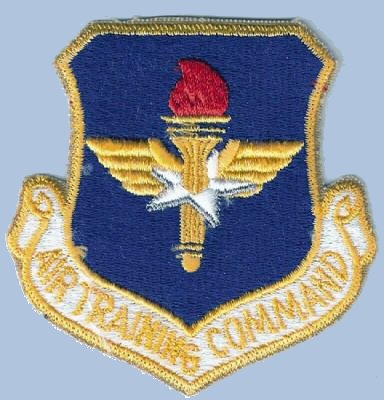
Greenville Air Force Base Greenville Army Airfield
- Part of Air Training Command (ATC)
- Located near Greenville, Mississippi
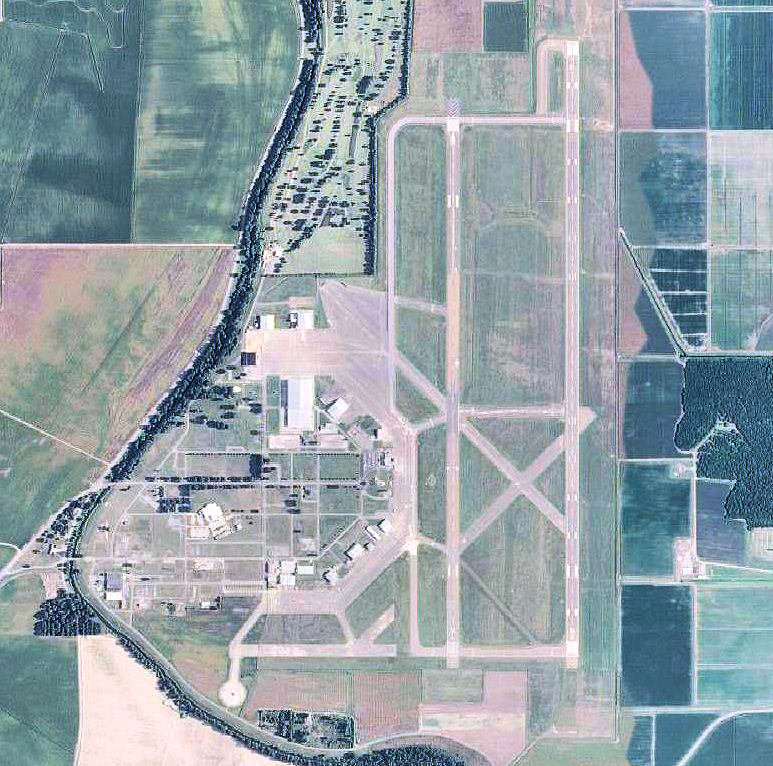
- USGS Aerial photo of Greenville AFB, 2006

Site information
- Type: Air Force Base
- Controlled by: United States Air Force

Location
- Coordinates: 33°28′58″N 90°59′08″W

Site history
- Built: 1940
- In use: 1941–1945;1950–1960

Garrison information
- Garrison: Air Training Command
- Occupants: AAF Basic Flying School (1941–1942); 334th Bombardment Group (Medium) (1942–1944); 3505th Pilot Training Wing (1950–1960); 3505th Technical Training Group (1960–1966)

Greenville Army Airfield 1943 photo pictorial

Greenville Air Force Base is a former United States Air Force base in Greenville, Mississippi. It was closed as a military installation in December 1966 and redeveloped into Mid-Delta Regional Airport.

== History ==
=== World War II ===
In February 1940, a United States Army Air Corps site selection board picked Greenville, Mississippi, as the location of a training center for the Second Aviation Initiative. By mid-June construction at the 2,000-acre (8.1 km^{2}), 140 building site was in full progress. The Air Corps activated Greenville Army Airfield in August 1940, only two months after construction commenced. The first aircraft arrived on 5 November. The first basic flying training class, 42-D, began on 22 December 1942 and was composed of 136 students.

Basic flying training at GAAF as of September 1943 consisted of the following:

Week	Hours	Description
1	3	Transition, including: turns, climbs, glides, stalls, spins, spiral, eights, and forced landings. Dual instruction in forced landings was given throughout the course and their importance was stressed.
2	5	Same as first week, plus: prior to solo students were instructed in and were competent to recover from spins. Spins included power-on spins, power-off spins, and spins from stalls, turns, and climbs. Emphasis was placed on stalls, both power-on and power-off. Started cross-wind landing practice.
3	9	Same as first two weeks, including accuracy, with 90 degrees side approached, steep banks and the start of instrument training.
4	9	Reviewed all previous work. Started chandelles, lazy eights, night flying and formation training.
5	9	Review. Started day navigation training and continued night flying, formation, and instrument training. Started power approaches.
6	9	Review. Continued night flying, formation, instrument, and day navigation. Started acrobatic training and pylon eight training.
7	9	Review. Continued night flying, formation, instrument, day navigation, acrobatic training, and pylon eight training.
8	9	Review. Continued formation, instrument, day navigation, and acrobatics. Started 180 degree side approaches, and night navigation training.
9	8	Review. Concluded formation, instrument, day and night navigation, acrobatics, 180 degree side approaches, and final check rides.

The airfield had many auxiliary landing fields to support pilot training:

- Greenville Municipal Airport 33°23′15″N 091°00′00″W
- Indianola Auxiliary Field 33°28′56″N 090°40′44″W
- Walker Auxiliary Field 33°36′30″N 090°51′20″W

From January 1942 until January 1944, 5,705 Aviation Cadets graduated from the Basic Flying School at Greenville Army Airfield, while 605 were eliminated for flying deficiencies and another 113 for non-flying deficiencies.

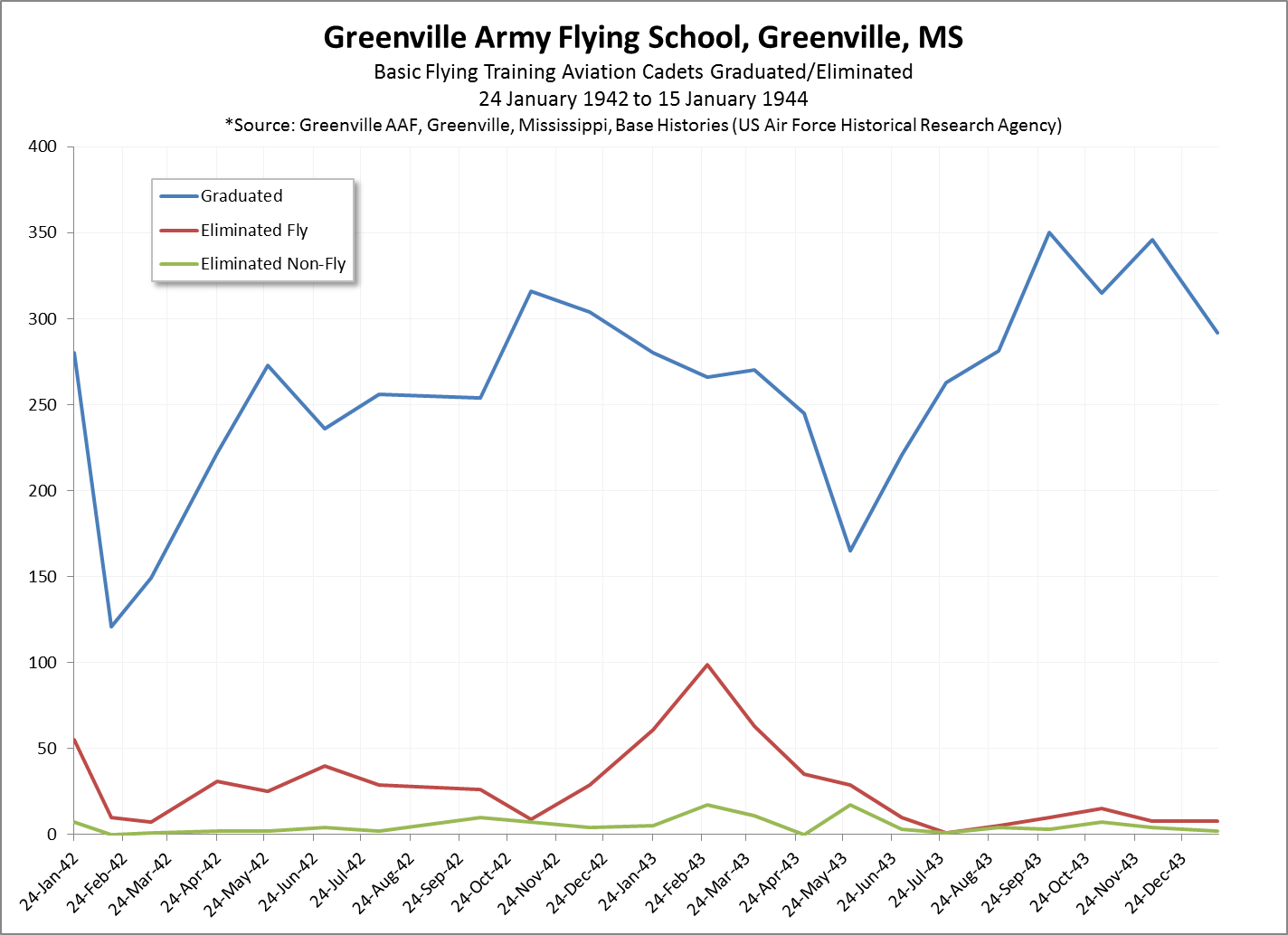
Number of Aviations Cadets graduated and eliminated from Basic Flying School at Greenville Army Airfield, Greenville, Mississippi, from 24 January 1942 to 15 January 1944.

The Army Air Forces Pilot Training School (Basic) conducted contract flying training until inactivated in March 1945. The airfield was reactivated on 5 June 1945 and was transferred to Air Technical Service Command, becoming a sub-base of Brookley Army Airfield, Alabama. ATSC used Greenville as a storage depot for returning Eighth and Fifteenth Air Force B-24 Liberators. During the summer, C-47s returning from Europe were also sent to Greenville for storage. Aircraft operations at the base consisted mostly of test flights, and flying stored aircraft to reclamation facilities. Storage of other types of aircraft began after the end of the war in September, with all the stored aircraft moved out by the end of June 1946. Greenville Army Airfield was inactivated on 22 July 1946 and turned over to the War Assets Administration for disposal.

=== Cold War ===
The airfield was operated as a civilian airport in the late 1940s. However, in order to handle increased pilot requirements for the Korean War, the United States Air Force's Air Training Command (ATC) activated the former World War II army airfield as Greenville Air Base on December 1, 1950. It was used as a station for a contract flying school, although contract flying squadrons were not established until 1951 when the 3300th Flying Training Squadron was activated.

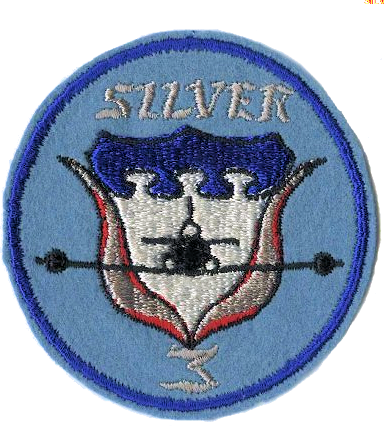
Emblem of the 3505th Pilot Training Wing (ATC)

ATC activated Graham Air Base, Florida in January 1953 to replace Greenville Air Base as a contract primary pilot training school. Greenville was redesignated as Greenville Air Force Base and became a full-fledged Air Training Command basic single-engine pilot training school, with the 3505th Pilot Training Wing (Basic, Single-Engine) as its operational training unit. Instruction was begun in April 1953 flying T-28 Trojans. The wing was upgraded to jet trainers in 1955 when T-33 Shooting Stars arrived.

On 1 December 1960, pilot training at Greenville was discontinued and the 3505th Pilot Training Wing was inactivated. The T-33s were sent to the new Consolidated Pilot Training school (later redesignated as Undergraduate Pilot Training, or UPT) at Craig Air Force Base, Alabama. Air Training Command initially wanted to close the base, however, owing to political pressure, several technical training courses were transferred to the base and the facility became the Greenville Air Technical Training Center for ATC. Between November 1960 and mid-1961, Greenville received six personnel courses from Lackland Air Force Base, Texas and two fire protection courses from Lowry Air Force Base, Colorado under the new 3505th Technical Training Wing. In 1962, several medical courses were also reassigned to Greenville from Lackland.

In December 1963, Secretary of Defense Robert MacNamara announced that Greenville would be closed in 1965 as part of budgetary reductions. During 1964, activities at Greenville began to be phased down, initially by downgrading the 3505th to group status and moving medical courses to Gunter Air Force Station, Alabama; personnel courses moved to Amarillo Air Force Base, Texas and firefighting courses to Chanute Air Force Base, Illinois. On 1 April 1964, the 3505th TTG was inactivated. Greenville Air Force Base was placed in caretaker status, being assigned as a sub-base to Keesler Air Force Base, Mississippi. De-militarization activities at Greenville AFB were commenced and the military part of the airport was returned to full civilian control on 27 December 1966.

== See also ==
- Mississippi World War II Army Airfields
- 27th Flying Training Wing (World War II)
