= KGWO =

KGWO may refer to:

- KGWO (FM), a radio station (89.5 FM) licensed to serve Ogallala, Nebraska, United States
- Greenwood–Leflore Airport (ICAO code KGWO)
