= Stinson Field =

Stinson Field can be any one of the following US airports:

- Stinson Municipal Airport in San Antonio, Texas
- Stinson Field Municipal Airport in Aberdeen, Mississippi
