= KIDL =

KIDL may refer to:

- the former ICAO code for what is now John F. Kennedy International Airport (when it was known as "Idlewild Airport")
- the current ICAO code for Indianola Municipal Airport
