= Greenwood Municipal Airport (Mississippi) =

Greenwood Municipal Airport (Old)
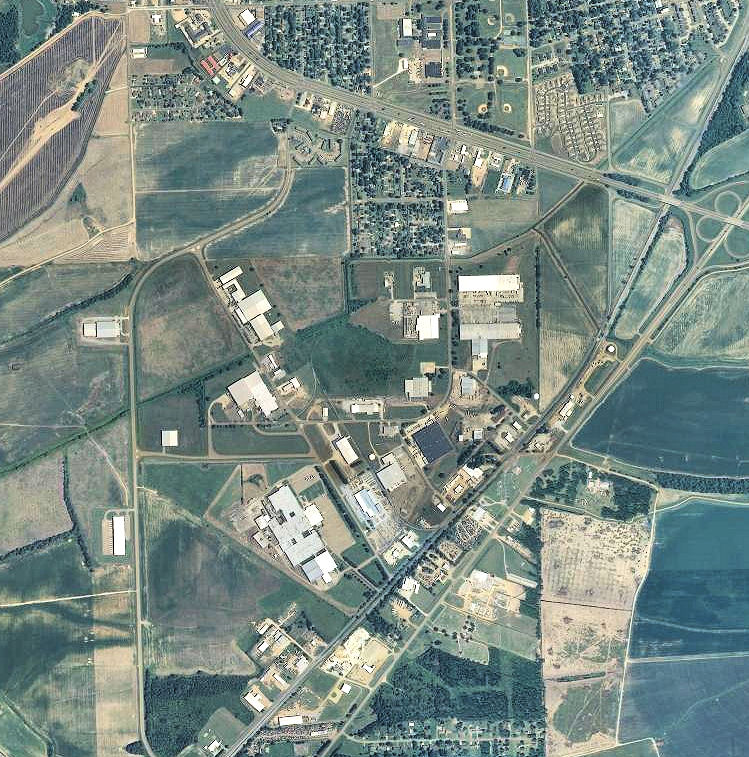
- 2006 USGS airphoto
- IATA: none; ICAO: none

Summary
- Serves: Greenwood, Mississippi
- Coordinates: 33°30′00″N 090°11′55″W

Map
- Location of Greenwood Municipal Airport (Old)

Greenwood Municipal Airport (Old) is a former airport located 2 miles southwest of Greenwood, Mississippi. It was closed about 1970 and flight operations were moved to the Greenwood-Leflore Airport. Today it is an industrial area.

== History ==
Greenwood Municipal Airport opened about 1931 as the airport for Greenwood, Mississippi. The airfield was said to have 2 sod runways: 2,960 feet (900 m) and 2,800 feet (850 m) long. It was also known as "Leflore Airport". During World War II the Army Air Corps took over control of the airport in 1942 and three 4,000 feet (1,200 m) hard-surface runways were built. The airport was used as an auxiliary landing field for the main Army Air Base across town Greenwood Army Airfield.

After the war ended, civil control of the airport was returned to the City of Greenwood, with the airport having passenger service provided by Chicago & Southern Airlines with Lockheed Electras and later DC-3s. In the 1950s, Delta Air Lines acquired C&S and it was served by Convair 440s.

Urban encroachment and the short runways led to the closure of the airport about 1970. Today the site has been redeveloped into a light industrial estate. Only one hangar and a small part of a runway remain.

== See also ==
- Mississippi World War II Army Airfields
