= Air Forces of the United States =

Air Forces of the United States include the current United States Air Force; its executive department; its current, former, and predecessor numbered Air Forces (e.g., Eighth Air Force); or numerous other US organizations (e.g., 3 were designated "… Training Air Force" as "major subordinate units" of Air Training Command). Air Force or Air Forces regarding the United States may also refer to:

- Air Forces Iceland
- Army Air Forces (AAF), "HQ AAF" at tbd 1941-1947, the World War II US Army organization that became the post-war USAF
- Confederate Air Force (Commemorative Air Force in 2002), a civilian preservation and demonstration organization for vintage aircraft
- Crew Training Air Force (CTAF), Randolph AFB 1952-7, to train Korean War combat crews and free FTAF "to concentrate on…pilot and observer training programs"
- Far East Air Forces
- GHQ Air Force
- Flying Training Air Force (FTAF), Waco AFB TX 1951-8, the USAF flight school when Air Training Command "split its training responsibilities"
- Tactical Air Forces
- Technical Training Air Force (TTAF), Gulfport MS 1951-tbd, with "ten stations" for "technical and basic" training and later 7 technical and 10 pilot training bases (TTAF formed when ATC "split its training responsibilities")
- United States Air Forces in Europe
- Women's Airforce (WAF), which on 12 June I94S became part of the Air Force when "Congress passed the Women's Armed Services Integration Act"
