= Mississippi World War II Army Airfields =

Mississippi World War II Army Airfields
- Part of World War II

Site information
- Type: Army Airfields

Location
- Map Of Major Mississippi World War II Army Airfields Third Air Force AAF Training Command; AAF Contract Flying Schools; Troop Carrier Command

Site history
- Built: 1940-1944
- In use: 1940-present

During World War II, the United States Army Air Forces (USAAF) established numerous airfields in Mississippi for antisubmarine defense in the Gulf of Mexico and for training pilots and aircrews of USAAF fighters and bombers.

Most of these airfields were under the command of Third Air Force or the Army Air Forces Training Command (AAFTC) (A predecessor of the current-day United States Air Force Air Education and Training Command). However the other USAAF support commands (Air Technical Service Command (ATSC); Air Transport Command (ATC) or Troop Carrier Command operated a significant number of airfields in support roles.

It is still possible to find remnants of these wartime airfields. Many were converted into municipal airports, some were returned to agriculture and several were retained as United States Air Force installations and were front-line bases during the Cold War. Hundreds of the temporary buildings that were used survive today, and are being used for other purposes.

== Major Airfields ==
=== Third Air Force ===
- Key Field, Meridian

39th Army Air Force Base Unit
Now: Key Field Air National Guard Base

- Laurel Army Airfield, Laurel

473d Base Headquarters and Air Base Squadron
Assigned to Air Technical Service Command, (1944-1946)
Now: Hesler-Noble Field

- Hattiesburg Army Airfield, Hattiesburg

39th Army Air Force Base Unit
Assigned to Air Technical Service Command, (1942-1945)
Now: Hattiesburg Bobby L. Chain Municipal Airport

=== AAF Training Command ===
- Columbus Army Airfield, Columbus, Mississippi

Southeast Training Center, 1941
Eastern Flying Training Command
30th (Advanced Twin-Engine) Flying Training Wing
Now: Columbus Air Force Base
Known sub-bases and auxiliaries

Columbus Auxiliary Field
River Auxiliary Field
Caledonia Auxiliary Field
Waterworks Auxiliary Field
Columbus Municipal Airport (Old)
Vaughn Auxiliary Field
Stinson Auxiliary Field
Starkville Auxiliary Field

- Greenville Army Airfield, Greenville, Mississippi

Southeast Training Center, 1941
Army Air Forces Pilot Training School (Basic)
74th Army Air Force Base Unit
Assigned to Air Technical Service Command, (1945-1946)
Was: Greenville Air Force Base (1950-1965)
Contract Flying School* (1950-1953)
3505th Pilot Training Wing (Basic, Single-Engine) (1953-1960)
Technical Training Center (1960-1965)
Now: Mid Delta Regional Airport
Known sub-bases and auxiliaries

Greenville Municipal Airport
Indianola Auxiliary Field
Walker Auxiliary Field

- Greenwood Army Airfield, Greenwood

Eastern Flying Training Command
Army Air Forces Flying School (Basic)
7th Basic Flying Training Group
Reassigned to Third Air Force (1945)
Now: Greenwood-Leflore Airport
Known sub-bases and auxiliaries

Paynes Auxiliary Field
Oxberry Auxiliary Field
Avalon Auxiliary Field
Curger Auxiliary Field
Tchula Auxiliary Field
Greenwood Municipal Airport

- Gulfport Army Airfield, Gulfport

Headquarters, Eastern Technical Training Command
Joint use with Third Air Force (1944-1945)
Reopened as Gulfport Air Force Base (1951-1958)
Headquarters, Technical Training Air Force also Contract Flying School
Now: Gulfport Combat Readiness Training Center
Known sub-bases and auxiliaries

Gulfport Auxiliary Field
Hancock County Airport

- Keesler Army Airfield, Biloxi

Western Technical Training Command
Basic Training and Technical Training Center
Now: Keesler Air Force Base

.* Greenville was designated as an "Air Base" by Air Training Command while operated as private contractor-operated training facilities in the 1950s.

==== AAF Contract Flying Schools ====
- Cleveland Army Airfield, Cleveland

Eastern Flying Training Command
Contract Flying School: Cleveland School of Aviation
Now: Cleveland Municipal Airport

- Fletcher Field, Clarksdale

2154th Air Base Unit
Contract Flying School: Clarksdale School of Aviation
Now: Fletcher Field
Known sub-bases and auxiliaries

Clarksdale Auxiliary Field
Ellis Auxiliary Field

- Jackson Army Air Base, Jackson

Contract Flying School: Mississippi Institute of Aeronautics
35th Army Air Force Base Unit
Now: Jackson Air National Guard Base
Known sub-bases and auxiliaries

Augustine Auxiliary Field
Lee Auxiliary Field
Ratiff Auxiliary Field
Sutherland Auxiliary Field
Forest Auxiliary Field
Hinds County Airport
Lime Prairie Auxiliary Field

=== Troop Carrier Command ===
- Grenada Army Airfield, Grenada

443d Air Force Base Unit
Now: Grenada Municipal Airport
