= KHBG =

KHBG may refer to:

- Hattiesburg Bobby L. Chain Municipal Airport (ICAO code KHBG)
- KHBG-LP, a defunct low-power radio station (101.5 FM) licensed to serve Pasadena, California, United States
