= Vaughn Airport =

Vaughn Airport Vaughn Auxiliary Army Airfield
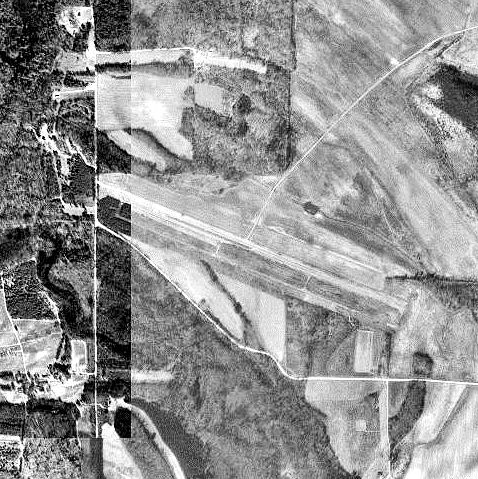
- 1992 USGS airphoto
- IATA: none; ICAO: none

Summary
- Serves: Columbus, Mississippi
- Coordinates: 33°22′52″N 088°22′02″W

Map
- Location of Vaughn Airport

Vaughn Airport is an abandoned airport located 9 miles south-southeast of Columbus, Mississippi.

== History ==
The airport was built about 1942 as an auxiliary airfield to the Army pilot school at Columbus Army Airfield. It was designated Vaughn Auxiliary Army Airfield #6 It had a single northwest/southeast paved runway, and did not have any hangars or structures. It was apparently unmanned unless necessary for aircraft recovery.

It was sold after the war in 1945 and during the postwar years was used as a civil airport. The Air Force apparently kept a right of return to the airport, it being used during the 1950s as a training and emergency landing field for Craig AFB, Alabama. The civil airport closed about 1960, and the facility was abandoned.

It was later used during the 1960s and 1970s as a drag strip but has since been abandoned again. The remains of the runway can be seen in aerial imagery. No evidence of any buildings can be seen.

== See also ==
- Mississippi World War II Army Airfields
