= Bruce Campbell Field =

Airport in Madison County, Mississippi

Bruce Campbell Field (former Augustine Auxiliary Field)
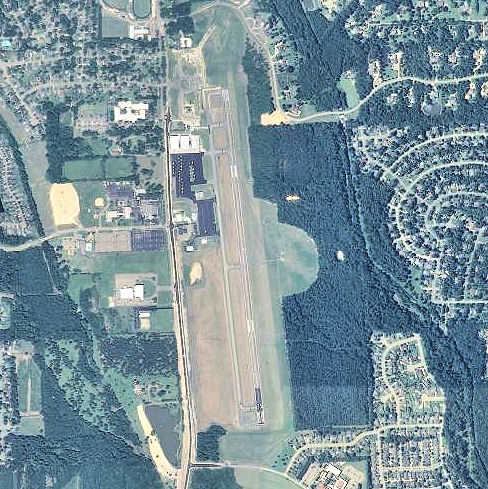
- USGS 2006 orthophoto
- IATA: DXE; ICAO: KMBO; FAA LID: MBO

Summary
- Airport type: Public
- Owner: City of Madison
- Serves: Madison, Mississippi
- Elevation AMSL: 326 ft (99 m)
- Coordinates: 32°26′19″N 90°06′11″W

Map
- Location of airport in Mississippi MBO (the United States)

Runways
Direction	Length		Surface
Direction	ft	m	Surface
17/35	4,444	1,355	Asphalt

Statistics (2011)
- Aircraft operations: 48,660
- Based aircraft: 63
- Source: Federal Aviation Administration

Bruce Campbell Field (IATA: DXE, ICAO: KMBO, FAA LID: MBO) is a city-owned public-use airport located two nautical miles (4 km) southeast of the central business district of Madison, a city in Madison County, Mississippi, United States. This airport is included in the National Plan of Integrated Airport Systems for 2011–2015, which categorized it as a general aviation airport.

Although many U.S. airports use the same three-letter location identifier for the FAA and IATA, this airport is assigned MBO by the FAA, and DXE from IATA (which assigned MBO to Mamburao Airport in the Philippines).

== Facilities and aircraft ==
Bruce Campbell Field covers an area of 260 acres (105 ha) at an elevation of 326 feet (99 m) above mean sea level. It has one runway designated 17/35 with an asphalt surface measuring 4,444 by 75 feet (1,355 x 23 m).

For the 12-month period ending April 14, 2011, the airport had 48,660 aircraft operations, an average of 133 per day: 99.8% general aviation and 0.2% military. At that time there were 63 aircraft based at this airport: 87% single-engine, and 13% multi-engine.

== History ==
The airport was opened in March 1941 as Augustine Auxiliary Field with an all-direction 4,000' turf takeoff/landing field. single 3,600' concrete runway. It began training United States Army Air Corps flying cadets under contract to Mississippi Institute of Aeronautics, Inc. The airport was assigned to Southeast Training Center (later Eastern Flying Training Command) as a primary (level 1) pilot training airfield, reporting to Jackson Army Air Base. The airfield had three local auxiliary airfields for emergency and overflow landings. Flying training was performed with Fairchild PT-19s as the primary trainer and also had several PT-17 Stearmans assigned.

The airfield was deactivated on June 30, 1945, with the drawdown of AAFTC's pilot training program. It was declared surplus and turned over to the Army Corps of Engineers on September 30, 1945, and was eventually discharged to the War Assets Administration (WAA) and became a civil airport.

== See also ==
- Mississippi World War II Army Airfields
- List of airports in Mississippi
- 29th Flying Training Wing (World War II)
