= George M. Bryan Airport =

Airport in Mississippi, US

George M. Bryan Airport (former Starkville AF Aux. Field)
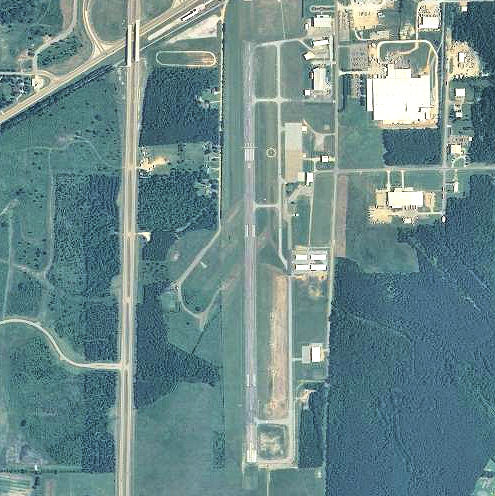
- USGS 2006 orthophoto
- IATA: none; ICAO: KSTF; FAA LID: STF

Summary
- Airport type: Public
- Owner: City of Starkville
- Serves: Starkville, Mississippi
- Elevation AMSL: 333 ft (101 m)
- Coordinates: 33°25′59″N 088°50′55″W

Map
- Location of airport in Mississippi STF (the United States)

Runways
Direction	Length		Surface
Direction	ft	m	Surface
18/36	5,550	1,692	Asphalt/Concrete

Statistics (2023)
- Aircraft operations (year ending 2/17/2023): 31,237
- Based aircraft: 52
- Source: Federal Aviation Administration

George M. Bryan Airport (ICAO: KSTF, FAA LID: STF) is a public use airport in Oktibbeha County, Mississippi, United States. It is owned by the City of Starkville and located three nautical miles (6 km) southwest of its central business district. This airport is included in the National Plan of Integrated Airport Systems for 2011–2015, which categorized it as a general aviation facility.

Also known as Starkville / Oktibbeha County Airport or George M. Bryan Field, the airport was named in honor of World War II veteran and Starkville native George Martin Bryan.

Although many U.S. airports use the same three-letter location identifier for the FAA and IATA, this airport is assigned STF by the FAA but has no designation from the IATA (which assigned STF to Stephens Island in Queensland, Australia).

== History ==
Opened in 1934 as Starkville Municipal Airport. During World War II the airport was taken over abruptly by the government to be used as a glider training base (Starkville AF Auxiliary Field). Plans for the AAF Basic Training Detachment were for 150 students using the Aeronca TG-5 gliders. The gliders were towed by Vultee BT-13 Valiant "Vultee Vibrators". Students lived in the dormitories at Mississippi State College, where they also used its classrooms and dining facilities.

== Facilities and aircraft ==
George M. Bryan Airport covers an area of 635 acres (257 ha) at an elevation of 333 feet (101 m) above mean sea level. It has one runway designated 18/36 with an asphalt and concrete surface measuring 5,550 by 150 feet (1,692 x 46 m).

For the 12-month period ending February 17, 2023, the airport had 31,237 aircraft operations, an average of 86 per day: 98% general aviation and 2% military. At that time there were 52 aircraft based at this airport: 41 single-engine, 7 glider, 2 jet, and 2 multi-engine.

== See also ==
- Mississippi World War II Army Airfields
- List of airports in Mississippi
