= River Airport =

River Airport River Auxiliary Field
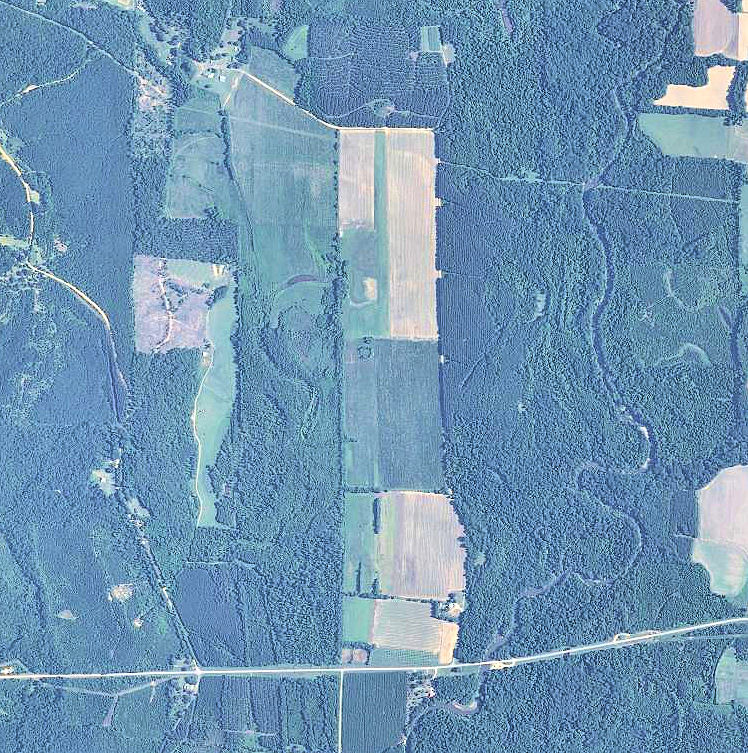
- 2006 USGS airphoto
- IATA: none; ICAO: none

Summary
- Serves: Caledonia, Mississippi
- Coordinates: 33°48′01″N 088°19′13″W

Map
- Location of River Auxiliary Field

River Airport is an abandoned airport located 8 miles (13 km) north of Caledonia, Mississippi, United States.

== History ==
The airport was built about 1942 as an auxiliary airfield to the Army pilot school at Columbus Army Airfield. It was designated River Auxiliary Field. It had a single sod 4,000-foot (1,200 m) runway, and did not have any hangars or structures. It was apparently unmanned unless necessary for aircraft recovery.

It was sold after the war in 1945. During the postwar years it was used as a civil airport and also by the USAF during the 1950s for occasional touch and go landings. It was closed in the 1960s and abandoned.

Today, the outline of the runway is visible in aerial photography. The airport itself is cleared agricultural fields.

== See also ==
- Mississippi World War II Army Airfields
