= Hot tamale (food) =

Mississippi Delta dish

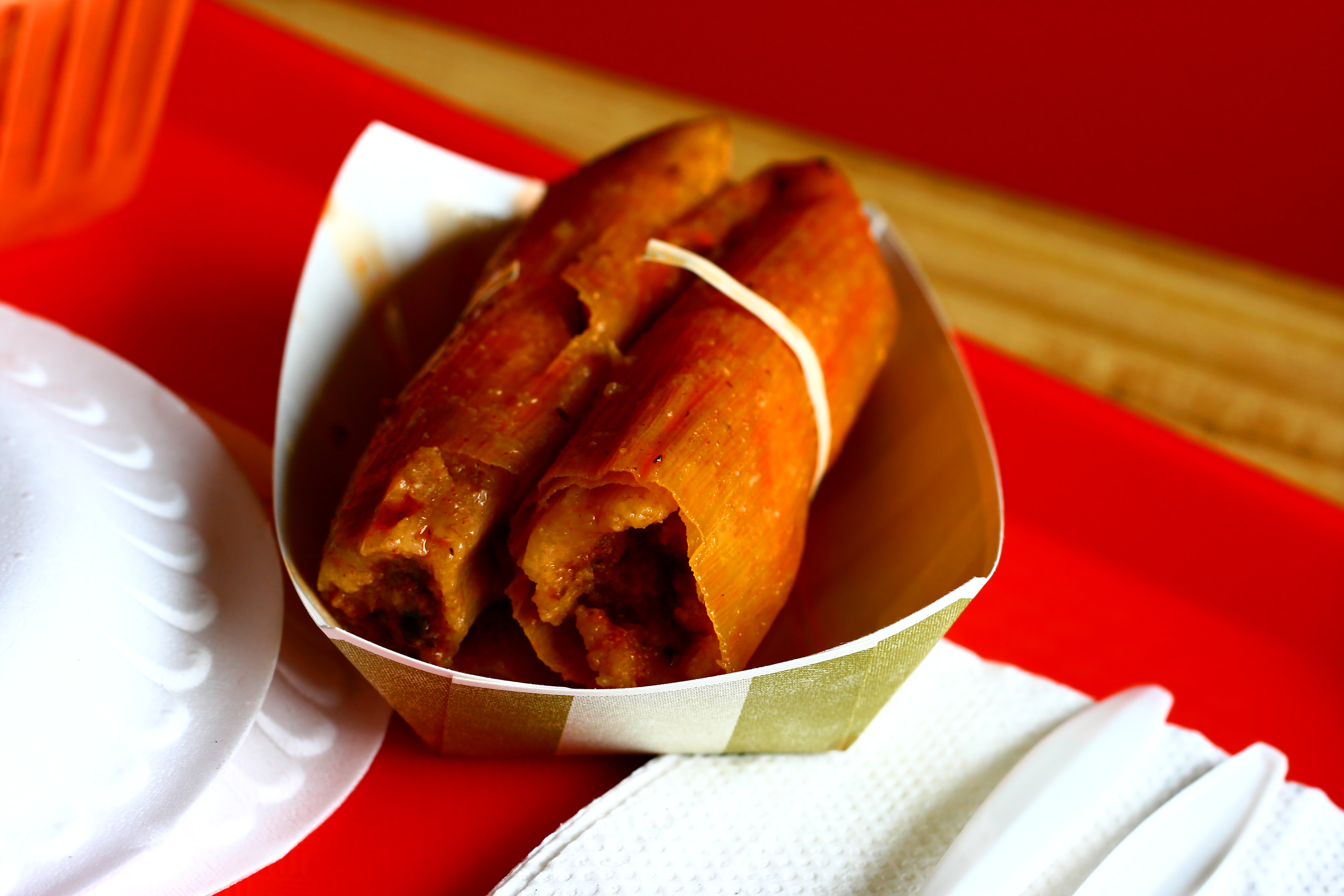
- Two hot tamales served in a tray
- Place of origin: United States
- Region or state: Mississippi Delta
- Main ingredients: Cornmeal, meat
- Similar dishes: Tamales

A hot tamale is a traditional dish native to the Mississippi Delta made of meat stuffed in cornmeal, wrapped in a corn husk, and simmered or boiled in a spiced brine. Hot tamales are smaller than the tamales found in Hispanic America and their recipes vary significantly from chef to chef. The most common meat is ground beef or pork, but some chefs use turkey or even venison if brought in by customers.

== History ==
While the exact history of the hot tamale is unknown, there are several competing theories to explain its origin. One theory suggests that the meal dates back to the food prepared by Native Americans of the Mississippi delta. Another posits that it was brought back by soldiers returning from the Mexican-American War in the late 1840s. The final theory holds that the meal was created in the early 20th century when African Americans adapted the tamales prepared by Mexican migrant workers, which is believed by local historians to be the most likely origin.

== Hot Tamale Trail ==
The "Hot Tamale Trail", a collection of restaurants and eateries that serve hot tamales, was created as a result of the documentation of the hot tamale by the Southern Foodways Alliance in the early 2000s. Local restaurants in Rosedale, Cleveland, Greenville, and Vicksburg can be found along the trail. Greenville has so many restaurants serving hot tamales that the city is the self-proclaimed "Hot Tamale Capital of the world" and holds the Hot Tamale Festival annually every October.

== See also ==
- Greenville, MS – Self-proclaimed "Hot Tamale Capital of the World".
- "They're Red Hot" – 1936 song about Hot Tamales by Delta blues musician Robert Johnson.
