= Stennis International Airport =

Stennis International Airport (former Hancock County Airport)
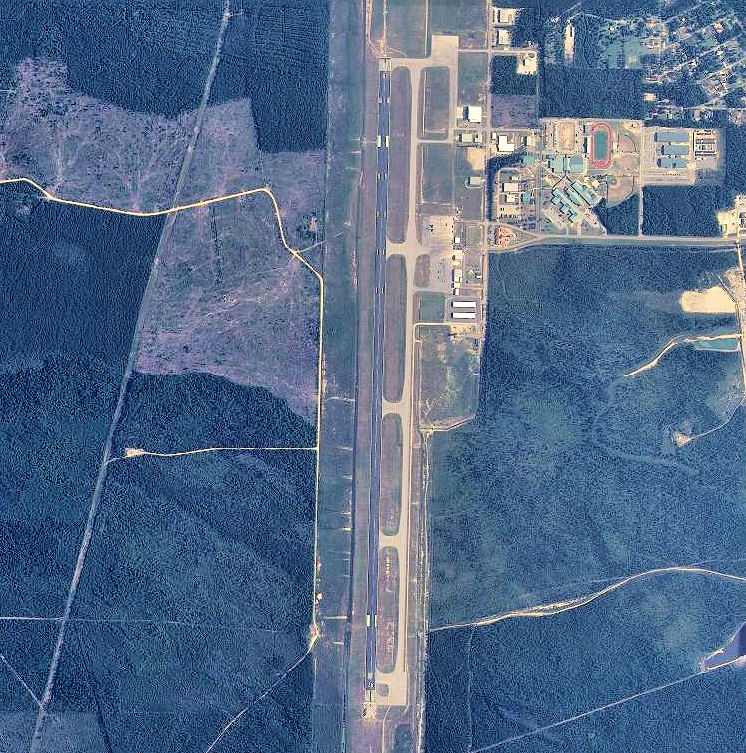
- USGS 2006 orthophoto
- IATA: none; ICAO: KHSA; FAA LID: HSA

Summary
- Airport type: Public
- Owner: Hancock County Port and Harbor Commission
- Serves: Bay St. Louis, Mississippi
- Elevation AMSL: 23 ft (7.0 m)
- Coordinates: 30°22′04″N 089°27′17″W
- Website: http://portairspace.com/

Map
- Location of airport in Mississippi HSA (the United States)

Runways
Direction	Length		Surface
Direction	ft	m	Surface
18/36	8,497	2,590	Asphalt

Statistics (2019)
- Aircraft operations: 63,600
- Based aircraft: 25
- Sources: FAA, airport website.

Stennis International Airport (ICAO: KHSA, FAA LID: HSA) is a public use airport in Hancock County, Mississippi, United States. Owned by the Hancock County Port and Harbor Commission, the airport is located eight nautical miles (15 km) northwest of the central business district of Bay St. Louis, Mississippi. It is included in the National Plan of Integrated Airport Systems for 2019–2023, which categorized it as a general aviation facility.

Although many U.S. airports use the same three-letter location identifier for the FAA and IATA, this airport is assigned HSA by the FAA but has no designation from the IATA.

== History ==
During World War II, the airport was known as Hancock County Airport until it was renamed for Mississippi Senator John C. Stennis. It was used as an auxiliary training airfield supporting the Army pilot training school at Gulfport Army Airfield. It eventually opened for civil use in May 1970.

== Facilities and aircraft ==
Stennis International Airport covers an area of 591 acres (239 ha) at an elevation of 23.3 feet (7 m) above mean sea level. It has one runway designated 18/36 with an asphalt surface measuring 8,497 by 150 feet (2,590 x 46 m).

For the 12-month period ending January 31, 2019, the airport had 63,600 aircraft operations, an average of 174 per day: 90% general aviation and 10% military. At that time there were 25 aircraft based at this airport: 80% single-engine, 16% multi-engine, and one jet.

Since January 2024, the world's largest solar-powered autonomous aircraft, operated by Skydweller Aero, has been based at Stennis International Airport.

== See also ==
- Mississippi World War II Army Airfields
- List of airports in Mississippi
