= Greenville Municipal Airport (Mississippi) =

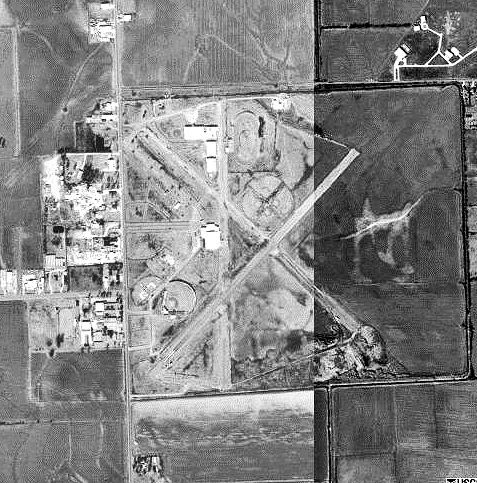
- 1996 USGS airphoto
- IATA: none; ICAO: none

Summary
- Serves: Greenville, Mississippi
- Coordinates: 33°23′15″N 091°00′05″W

Map
- Location of Greenville Municipal Airport

Greenville Municipal Airport is a former airport located 4 miles east-southeast of Greenville, Mississippi. It was closed about 1970 with air service being moved to the Mid Delta Regional Airport. Today it is used a municipal recreation complex known as Washington County Convention Center.

== History ==
The airport was built about 1942 as an auxiliary airfield for the Army pilot training school at Greenville Army Airfield as part of the 30,000 Pilot Training Program. It had three paved runways, the longest being the 4,000-foot (1,200 m) northwest/southeast & northeast/southwest runways. It had an aircraft parking ramp but did not have any hangars.

After the war ended, the airfield was turned over to the City of Greenville and it became the city municipal airport. Southern Airways began scheduled passenger airline service during the early 1950s with Douglas DC-3 prop aircraft flying daily round trip routings of Memphis - Greenville - Vicksburg - Jackson, MS - Natchez - Baton Rouge - New Orleans and also Memphis - Greenville - Vicksburg - Jackson, MS - Laurel - Hattiesburg - Mobile. By 1962, Southern was operating "Aristocrat" service into the airport with a Martin 4-0-4 prop aircraft flying a round trip routing of Bristol/Kingsport/Johnson City - Knoxville - Nashville - Jackson, TN - Memphis - Greenville - Monroe, LA - Baton Rouge - New Orleans in addition to its other flights serving Greenville. Southern subsequently moved its flights to the Mid Delta Regional Airport where in later years it operated Douglas DC-9 jet service. The municipal airport also had general aviation service until it was closed about 1970 as the airfield had relatively short runways and was being encroached by the city.

The airfield remains relatively intact, being used for recreational activities.

== See also ==
- Mississippi World War II Army Airfields
