= Gulfport Combat Readiness Training Center =

US Air Force facility in Mississippi, US

- Near Gulfport, Mississippi in the United States
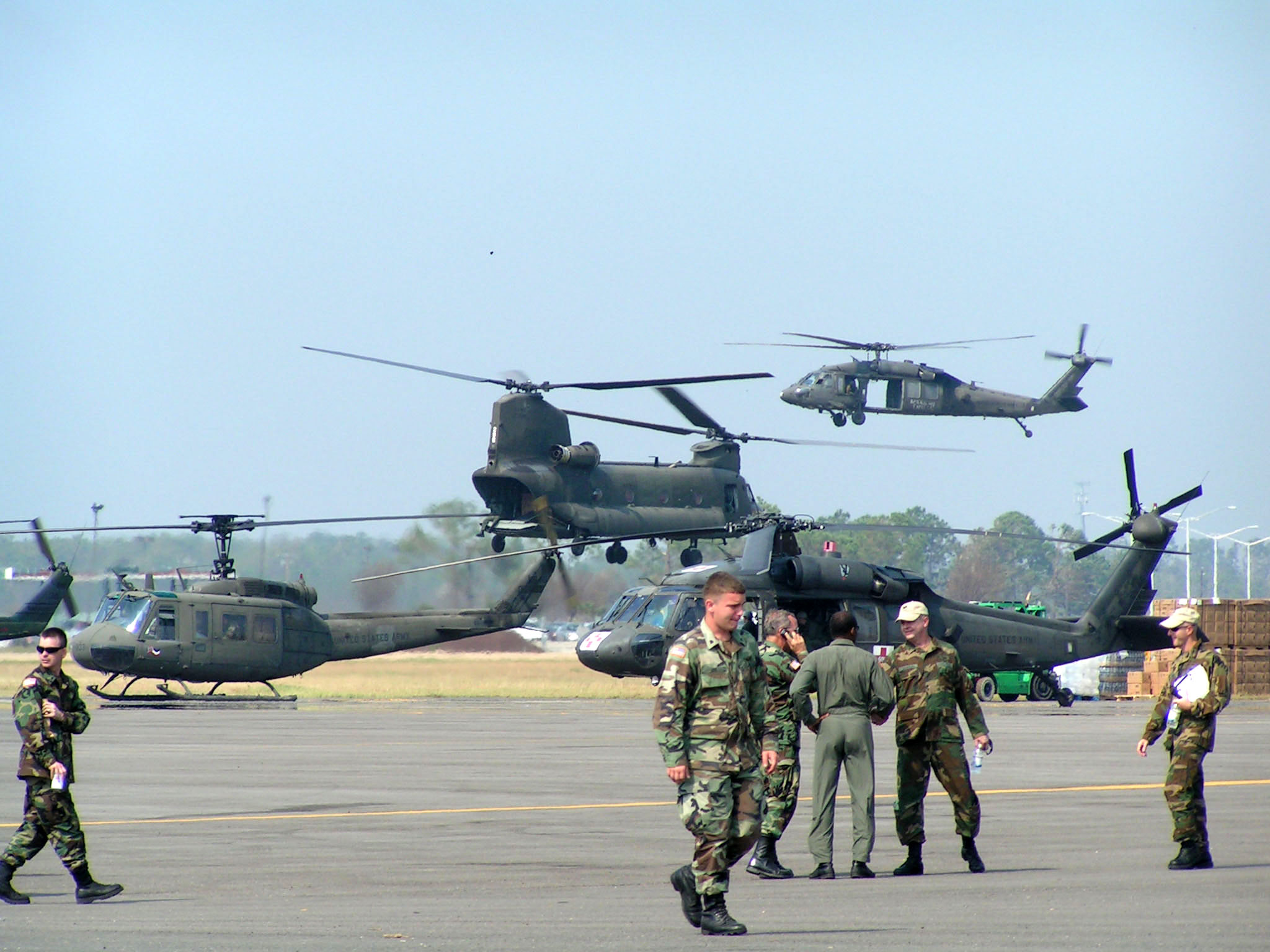
- US Army and US Air Force national guard helicopters training at Gulfport Combat Readiness Training Center.

Site information
- Type: Combat Readiness Training Center
- Owner: Department of Defense
- Operator: US Air Force (USAF)
- Controlled by: Mississippi Air National Guard
- Condition: Operational
- Website: Official website

Location
- Location in the United States
- Coordinates: 30°24′26″N 89°04′12″W

Site history
- Built: 1942 (as Gulfport Army Airfield)
- In use: 1942 – present

Garrison information
- Current commander: Colonel Robert J. “Jeff” Kirby
- Garrison: Air National Guard Combat Readiness Training Center

Airfield information
- Identifiers: IATA: GPT, ICAO: KGPT, FAA LID: GPT, WMO: 747685
- Elevation: 8.8 metres (29 ft) AMSL
Runways
Direction	Length and surface
14/32	2,743.8 metres (9,002 ft) Asphalt/Concrete
18/36	1,504.1 metres (4,935 ft) Asphalt
- Airfield shared with Gulfport-Biloxi International Airport. Source: Federal Aviation Administration

Gulfport Combat Readiness Training Center is a United States Air Force training center, located at Gulfport-Biloxi International Airport, Mississippi. It is located 5 miles (8.0 km) north-northeast of Gulfport, Mississippi.

== Overview ==
The Air National Guard Combat Readiness Training Center (CRTC) at Gulfport, Mississippi hosts regular deployments of Air National Guard units, and offers convenient offshore airspace that is fully instrumented (ACMI) for recording air-to-air engagements. Nearby Camp Shelby, MS features an air-to-ground range and sufficient low-altitude MOA airspace to provide realistic ground attack scenarios.

All Airspace and ranges/drop zones are instrumented on the $26 million Air Combat Training System (ACTS). This system provides training and debriefing capability and combines electronic threat and scoring systems as well.

The CRTC has approximately 160 full-time military and civilian employees with a sixty-five million dollar economic impact for FY99. The CRTC has bed space for approximately 1,000 personnel and can accommodate up to three separate flying units simultaneously. Flight line ramp space can support up to nine C-5s, twenty-two KC-135s or one hundred fighters.

The CRTC has two tenant Mississippi Air National Guard units on base.

- The 255th Air Control Squadron (ACS), activated in 1971 as a Combat Communications Squadron (CCS), was converted to a Control and Reporting Center (CRC) in 1987. They were the first Air National Guard unit to receive datalink capabilities for all joint forces. In 1998, the 255th was converted to their role of Air Control. ACTS provides Ground Control Intercept (GCI) capability to the total force, as well as other very vital activities. The 255th ACS has 255 personnel and is combat ready in all areas. Their mission is to organize, train and equip personnel to provide an operational ready Control and Reporting Center in support of worldwide theater air operations and statewide emergency contingencies.
- The 209th Civil Engineer Squadron (CES). The 209th CES was formed as the 173rd Civil Engineering Flight in 1969, and has grown over the years at its present manning of 90 personnel. The function of the 209th CES is to provide a mobile emergency engineering force for base damage recovery after attack. This unit constantly trains and maintains a state of readiness to allow short notice deployment capability. This is accomplished through management of the Rapid Runway Repair (RRR) site and the fire training facility. Within the first year of opening, the new RRR site had trained 1,600 personnel, and over 1,400 personnel were scheduled for training in the year 2000. The 209th CES began augmenting the United States Air Force (USAF) "Silver Flag" Training Program at Tyndall AFB, FL in FY00. It is a geographically separated unit of the 172nd Airlift Wing. When activated for active-duty service, the 209th falls under the jurisdiction of the Air Force Special Operations Command.

While not considered a tenant of the CRTC, 1108 Theater Aviation Sustainment Maintenance Group (formerly known as the 1108th Aviation Classification Repair Activity Depot, or AVCRAD), Mississippi Army National Guard, is co-located at the Gulfport-Biloxi Regional Airport. They are a full Army aviation maintenance depot facility.

== History ==
=== World War II ===
The facility was originally constructed in 1942 by the United States Army Air Forces as a training base for Air Corps Flying Training Command. Gulfport Army Airfield opened on 7 July, and the Eastern Technical Training Command conducted technical training and basic training until transferred to Third Air Force on 31 March 1944 with joint use by Technical Training Command for marine training of Emergency Rescue School (3d Air Rescue Group) located at Keesler Army Airbase. The airfield had many several landing fields to support pilot training:

- Gulfport Auxiliary Field 30°23′30″N 089°06′00″W
- Hancock County Airport 30°22′26″N 089°27′13″W

Under Third Air Force, the 328th Army Air Force Base Unit conducted replacement training for heavy bomber (B-17 Flying Fortress, B-24 Liberator) units. In addition B-29 Superfortress aircrew transition training was performed. With the end of the war and the drawdown of the military, Gulfport AAF was placed into reserve status on 31 January 1946.

Gulfport Field was declared excess by the Air Force and conveyed by the War Assets Administration to the City of Gulfport in 1949 for use as a civil airport. The City negotiated airline service contracts with Southern Airways and later National Airlines to provide passenger and cargo service beginning in the early 1950s.

=== Gulfport Air Force Base ===
Due to the large expansion of the United States Air Force as a result of the Cold War, a new lease was obtained for military use of the airport and Gulfport Air Force Base was opened as a joint-use civil/military facility. Improvements were made by the Air Force to the field to bring the wartime facilities up to permanent Air Force standards, so that on 16 July 1951, when Gulfport AFB was activated and assigned to the Air Training Command (ATC), it was able to become the headquarters of the new Technical Training Air Force (TTAF), which controlled technical and basic training of Air Force personnel. The TTAF controlled 10 Air Force wings from Gulfport:

7 Technical Training wings:

- 3310th, Scott AFB, Illinois
- 3320th, Amarillo AFB, Texas
- 3345th, Chanute AFB, Illinois
- 3380th, Keesler AFB, Mississippi
- 3415th, Lowry AFB, Colorado
- 3450th, Francis E. Warren AFB, Wyoming
- 3750th, Sheppard AFB, Texas

1 USAF Recruiting Wing: 3500th, Wright-Patterson AFB, Ohio

1 USAF Military Basic Training Wing: 3700th, Lackland AFB, Texas

1 USAF Mobile Training Wing: 3499th, Chanute AFB, Illinois

In addition, contract basic flying training for prospective pilots was also conducted at Gulfport AFB.

In 1957, ATC decided to assign all flying and crew training responsibilities under a single headquarters. In addition, effective 1 July 1958, the command discontinued the Technical Training Air Force and moved all training headquarters to their controlling major commands or to ATC, depending on its mission. Recruiting and Basic Training were also reassigned to HQ ATC. Gulfport AFB was closed as an active Air Force installation and its military facilities were transferred to the Mississippi Air National Guard, with the airport remaining a joint-use airport and Air National Guard base.

=== Mississippi Air National Guard ===
Beginning in 1953, the Mississippi Air National Guard developed a training activity which has grown into a facility renamed Combat Readiness Training Center Gulfport, one of four such CRTCs in the nation. Military traffic has expanded each year, and now more than 20,000 Air National Guard and Air Force Reserve Command flight personnel are trained at the base annually. Within 10 minutes, supersonic fighters, in-flight refueling aircraft and airlift aircraft can simulate a combat environment over the Gulf of Mexico or at Camp Shelby in Hattiesburg, MS. Additionally, the Army National Guard established the Aviation Classification Repair Depot operation which repairs several types of combat and transport helicopters for military activities throughout the Southeast and Puerto Rico.

== See also ==
- Mississippi World War II Army Airfields
- Eastern Technical Training Command
