= Greenville Mid-Delta Airport =

Airport in Mississippi, United States

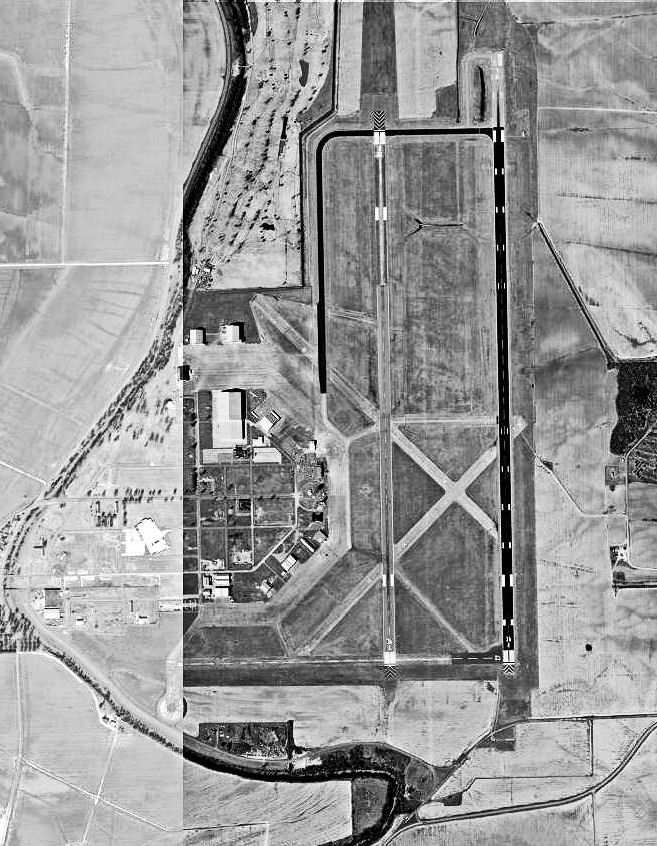
- USGS 1996 orthophoto
- IATA: GLH; ICAO: KGLH; FAA LID: GLH

Summary
- Airport type: Public
- Owner: City of Greenville
- Serves: Greenville, Mississippi
- Elevation AMSL: 131 ft (40 m)
- Coordinates: 33°28′58″N 090°59′08″W
- Website: greenvillems.org/citygovernment/airport/

Map
- Location of airport in Mississippi GLH (the United States)

Runways
Direction	Length		Surface
Direction	ft	m	Surface
18L/36R	8,001	2,439	Asphalt
18R/36L	7,019	2,139	Asphalt/concrete

Statistics (2019)
- Aircraft operations (year ending 7/31/2019): 22,974
- Based aircraft: 7
- Source: Federal Aviation Administration

Greenville Mid-Delta Airport (IATA: GLH, ICAO: KGLH, FAA LID: GLH), operating as Mid Delta Regional Airport until 2011, is a public use airport in unincorporated Washington County, Mississippi, United States. It is located five nautical miles (6 mi, 9 km) northeast of the central business district of Greenville, the city that owns the airport. It is served by one commercial airline, Denver Air Connection, which is subsidized by the Essential Air Service program. Formerly, the facility was known as Greenville Air Force Base.

As per the Federal Aviation Administration, this airport had 6,310 passenger boardings (enplanements) in calendar year 2008, 6,290 in 2009, 6,609 in 2010, 7,417 in 2011, and 5,181 in 2012. The National Plan of Integrated Airport Systems for 2011–2015 categorized it as a non-primary commercial service airport.

== Facilities and aircraft ==
Mid-Delta Regional Airport is the only commercial airport located in the Mississippi Delta. Located approximately 3 miles (4.8 km) north of central Greenville, MDRA is situated on 2,000 acres (810 ha) of land, with a sizable portion in the Mid-Delta Empowerment Zone. A controlled airfield, MDRA has a control tower which is staffed from 7:00 a.m. to 7:00 p.m., seven days a week.

The facility has two runways, the primary being 18L/36R which is composed of an asphalt surface 150 feet (46 m) wide by 8,001 feet (2,439 m) long. Runway 18L/36R is a precision approach runway with an Instrument landing System (ILS), medium approach lighting system with rails, (MALSR) approach lights and High Intensity Runway Lights (HIRLs). A parallel runway, 18R/36L, has an asphalt and concrete surface with a width of 150 feet (46 m) and length of 7,019 feet (2,139 m). Runway 18R/36L is a non-precision runway with Medium Intensity Runway Lights, (MIRL). The runways are connected by six taxiways. Ramp space is abundant, with 2,660,000 square feet (247,000 m^{2}) of concrete ramp area.

For the 12-month period ending July 31, 2019, the airport had 22,974 aircraft operations, an average of 63 per day: 66% general aviation 28% military, 6% air taxi, and <1% scheduled commercial. At that time there were 7 aircraft based at this airport: 5 single-engine and 2 multi-engine.

== History ==
Historically, Greenville had scheduled passenger service provided by Southern Airways commencing during the early 1950s from the former Greenville Municipal Airport (Mississippi) operated with Douglas DC-3 prop aircraft flying daily round trip routings of Memphis - Greenville - Vicksburg - Jackson, MS - Natchez - Baton Rouge - New Orleans and Memphis - Greenville - Vicksburg - Jackson, MS - Laurel - Hattiesburg - Mobile. Southern subsequently moved its service to Mid Delta Regional and in 1968 was operating six departures a day from the airport all with Martin 4-0-4 prop aircraft with three nonstop flights a day to its Memphis hub as well as three direct, no change of plane flights a day to New Orleans via various stops en route. Southern subsequently began operating Douglas DC-9-10 jetliners from the airport on nonstop flights to Memphis with direct service to Baton Rouge and New Orleans via an intermediate stop in Monroe, Louisiana and also on a direct, one stop basis to Atlanta. Other DC-9 jet flights operated by Southern continued on direct, no change of plane routings to Chicago, Orlando and Fort Lauderdale. The July 1, 1978 Southern system timetable listed two nonstop DC-9 flights a day to its Memphis hub as well as one nonstop DC-9 flight a day to Monroe with this service continuing on to Baton Rouge, New Orleans, Fort Walton Beach (served via Eglin Air Force Base), Orlando and Fort Lauderdale, and one nonstop DC-9 flight a day to Jackson with this service continuing on to Atlanta which also served as a hub for Southern.

Southern then merged with North Central Airlines to form Republic Airlines which in turn continued to serve Greenville. According to the July 1, 1979 Republic system timetable, the airline was operating nonstop DC-9 jet service to Memphis where it was operating a hub as well as nonstop service to Monroe and was also operating direct, no change of plane DC-9 service to Atlanta (which also served as a hub for Republic), Baton Rouge, Fort Lauderdale, Fort Walton Beach via Eglin Air Force Base, Greenville/Spartanburg, SC, Huntsville/Decatur, AL, Miami, New Orleans, New York City via LaGuardia Airport, Orlando and Washington D.C. via Dulles Airport. Republic subsequently ceased all flights from Greenville and had withdrawn from the market by 1986.

In 1989, Northwest Airlink nonstop service from Alexandria, Louisiana, Memphis and Monroe was being operated on a code sharing basis by Express Airlines I on behalf of Northwest Airlines (which was operating a hub in Memphis at this time) with British Aerospace BAe Jetstream 31 and Saab 340 commuter turboprop aircraft.

In May 2015, SeaPort Airlines announced that it planned to end service to and from the airport. After receiving proposals from four airlines, the Greenville city council unanimously chose Boutique Air as its next airline.

In July 2017, The US Department of Transportation has approved Greenville’s choice for subsidized air service. Boutique Air, which has been serving Mid Delta Regional Airport since 2015 would remain the carrier through 2021, with a caveat.

On 11 August 2021, Contour Airlines was announced as Greenville Mid-Delta Airport's (GLH) new federal Essential Air Service (EAS) air carrier, with daily service to Dallas/Fort Worth International Airport (DFW) and five-times weekly service (every day except Tuesdays and Saturdays) to Nashville International Airport (BNA). Contour Airlines replaced Boutique Air at the airport from 1 October 2021 and currently operates Embraer ERJ-135 regional jets on its services.

On 03 June 2025, Greenville Mid-Delta Airport announced a change in its Essential Air Service (EAS) provider, selecting Denver Air Connection to replace Contour Airlines. The decision was made by the Greenville city council following a competitive selection process that included presentations from three airlines and community input through surveys. Airport Director Levell Hawkins recommended Denver Air Connection based on residents' expressed preference for Atlanta access and concerns about Contour's lack of an established gate at Atlanta's airport. Denver Air Connection will offer 12 weekly flights split between Hartsfield–Jackson Atlanta International Airport (ATL) and Dallas/Fort Worth International Airport (DFW), addressing community demands for reliable connectivity to major hubs. The airline change coincided with significant economic development in Washington County, including the construction of a new power plant and two pipelines, creating increased demand for dependable air transportation services.

== Accidents and incidents ==
On June 8, 1988, a USAF Lockheed C-130 Hercules of the 189th Tactical Airlift Group, Arkansas Air National Guard, on a training flight from its home station of Little Rock AFB, crashed 1.5 miles from Greenville Airport during an attempted approach. All 6 occupants were killed.

On 3 June 2018, a storm system destroyed the hangar and most of the aircraft at the airport.

== Airlines and destinations ==
Denver Air Connection connects Greenville Airport to Hartsfield–Jackson Atlanta International Airport and Dallas Fort Worth International Airport.

== Statistics ==
Passenger boardings (enplanements) by year, as per the FAA
Year	2009	2010	2011	2012	2013	2014	2015	2016	2017	2018	2019
Enplanements	6,310	6,609	7,417	5,181	3,029	1,650	773	4,986	5,646	5,634	3,687
Change	▼0.32%	▲5.07%	▲12.23%	▼30.15%	▼41.54%	▼45.53%	▼53.15%	▲545.02%	▲13.24%	▼0.21%	▼34.56%
Airline	Mesaba Airlines dba Delta Connection	Mesaba Airlines dba Delta Connection	Mesaba Airlines dba Delta Connection	Pinnacle Airlines dba Delta Connection	Silver Airways	Silver Airways	SeaPort Airlines	Boutique Air	Boutique Air	Boutique Air	Boutique Air
Destination(s)	Memphis	Memphis	Memphis	Memphis	Atlanta Tupelo	Tupelo	Memphis	Dallas-Ft. Worth Nashville	Dallas-Ft. Worth Nashville	Dallas-Ft. Worth Nashville	Atlanta Dallas-Ft. Worth

== See also ==
- List of airports in Mississippi
