= Cleveland Municipal Airport (Mississippi) =

Airport in Mississippi, United States

Cleveland Municipal Airport (former Cleveland Army Airfield)
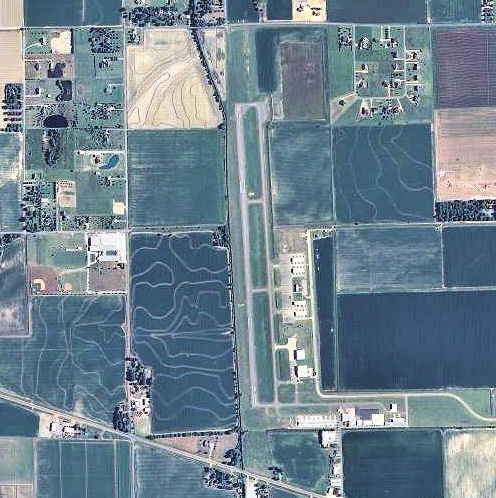
- USGS 2006 orthophoto
- IATA: none; ICAO: KRNV; FAA LID: RNV

Summary
- Airport type: Public
- Owner: City of Cleveland
- Serves: Cleveland, Mississippi
- Elevation AMSL: 140 ft (43 m)
- Coordinates: 33°45′40″N 90°45′28″W
- Website: clevelandmunicipalairport.com

Map
- Location of airport in Mississippi RNV (the United States)

Runways
Direction	Length		Surface
Direction	ft	m	Surface
18/36	5,005	1,526	Asphalt

Statistics (2012)
- Aircraft operations: 57,850
- Based aircraft: 48
- Source: Federal Aviation Administration

Cleveland Municipal Airport (ICAO: KRNV, FAA LID: RNV) is a public use airport in Bolivar County, Mississippi, United States. It is owned by the City of Cleveland and located two nautical miles (4 km) northwest of its central business district. This airport is included in the National Plan of Integrated Airport Systems for 2011–2015, which categorized it as a general aviation facility. There is no scheduled commercial airline service.

Although many U.S. airports use the same three-letter location identifier for the FAA and IATA, this airport is assigned RNV by the FAA but has no designation from the IATA.

== History ==
The airport was built by the United States Army Air Force and opened in April 1942 as a contract basic flying training airfield. Known as Cleveland Army Airfield, it was operated by the 3224th Air Base Unit, Contract Elementary Flying School (AAFFTC), Cleveland School of Aviation. Students were trained on Fairchild PT-23 and Boeing-Stearman PT-17 trainers. It operated until October 14, 1944 when the last class graduated. The equipment and aircraft at the base were declared excess and sold in November. The airfield was then turned over to civil authorities as an airport.

== Facilities and aircraft ==
Cleveland Municipal Airport covers an area of 133 acres (54 ha) at an elevation of 140 feet (42 m) above mean sea level. It has one runway designated 18/36 with an asphalt surface measuring 5,005 by 75 feet (1526 x 23 m).

For the 12-month period ending February 7, 2012, the airport had 57,850 general aviation aircraft operations, an average of 158 per day. At that time there were 48 aircraft based at this airport: 79% single-engine, 19% multi-engine, and 2% helicopter.

== See also ==
- Mississippi World War II Army Airfields
- List of airports in Mississippi
