= Fletcher Field =

Airport in Mississippi, US

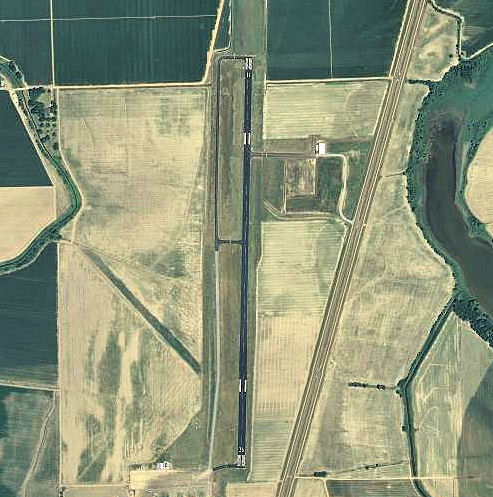
- USGS 2006 orthophoto
- IATA: CKM; ICAO: KCKM; FAA LID: CKM

Summary
- Airport type: Public
- Owner: Coahoma County Airport Board
- Serves: Clarksdale, Mississippi
- Location: Coahoma County
- Elevation AMSL: 173 ft (53 m)
- Coordinates: 34°17′59″N 90°30′44″W

Map
- Location of airport in Mississippi CKM (the United States)

Runways
Direction	Length		Surface
Direction	ft	m	Surface
18/36	5,404	1,647	Asphalt

Statistics (2011)
- Aircraft operations: 36,203
- Based aircraft: 18
- Source: Federal Aviation Administration

Fletcher Field (IATA: CKM, ICAO: KCKM, FAA LID: CKM) is a public use airport in Coahoma County, Mississippi, United States. It is owned by the Coahoma County Airport Board and located seven nautical miles (13 km) northeast of the central business district of Clarksdale, Mississippi. This airport is included in the National Plan of Integrated Airport Systems for 2011–2015, which categorized it as a general aviation facility. There is no scheduled commercial airline service.

== Facilities and aircraft ==
Fletcher Field covers an area of 252 acres (102 ha) at an elevation of 173 feet (53 m) above mean sea level. It has one runway designated 18/36 with an asphalt surface measuring 5,404 by 100 feet (1,647 x 30 m).

For the 12-month period ending November 8, 2011, the airport had 36,203 aircraft operations, an average of 99 per day: 99.8% general aviation and 0.2% military. At that time there were 18 aircraft based at this airport: 78% single-engine, 11% multi-engine, and 11% jet.

== History ==
Fletcher Field, was opened on July 5, 1942, and used by the United States Army Air Forces as a contract basic flying training airfield. It was operated by the 2154th Air Base Unit, Contract Elementary Flying School (AAFFTC), Clarksdale School of Aviation. Students were trained on Fairchild PT-19, Fairchild PT-23 and Boeing-Stearman PT-17 trainers. Known sub-bases and auxiliaries assigned to the field were:

- Clarksdale Auxiliary Field 31°11′40″N 090°33′01″W
- Ellis Auxiliary Field (Undetermined Location)

It operated until October 14, 1944, when the last class graduated. The equipment and aircraft at the base were declared excess and sold in November. The airfield was then turned over to civil authorities as an airport.

== See also ==
- Mississippi World War II Army Airfields
- List of airports in Mississippi
- 29th Flying Training Wing (World War II)
