= Hattiesburg Bobby L. Chain Municipal Airport =

Airport in Mississippi, US

Hattiesburg Bobby L. Chain Municipal Airport (former Hattiesburg Army Air Field)
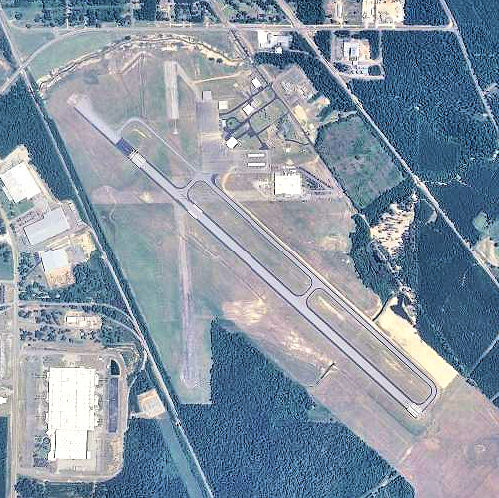
- USGS 2006 orthophoto
- IATA: HBG; ICAO: KHBG; FAA LID: HBG

Summary
- Airport type: Public
- Owner: City of Hattiesburg
- Serves: Hattiesburg, Mississippi
- Elevation AMSL: 151 ft (46 m)
- Coordinates: 31°15′54″N 89°15′10″W

Map
- Location of airport in Mississippi HBG (the United States)

Runways
| Direction | Length | | Surface |
| Direction | ft | m | Surface |
|---|---|---|---|
| 13/31 | 6,094 | 1,857 | Asphalt |

Statistics (2012)
- Aircraft operations: 39,672
- Based aircraft: 45
- Source: Federal Aviation Administration

Hattiesburg Bobby L. Chain Municipal Airport (IATA: HBG, ICAO: KHBG, FAA LID: HBG) in Forrest County, Mississippi is owned by the City of Hattiesburg and is five miles southeast of downtown.

The National Plan of Integrated Airport Systems for 2011–2015 called it a general aviation facility. There is no scheduled airline service; Hattiesburg–Laurel Regional Airport has commercial airline service.

== History ==
The airport opened in 1930.

Alarmed by the fall of France in 1940, Congress funded an increase from 29 to 54 combat groups in the United States Army Air Corps. The quickest way to get more bases was to use existing civil airports. The Air Corps signed an agreement to lease Hattiesburg Airport, but construction did not begin until March 1941.

Construction involved runways and airplane hangars, with three concrete runways, several taxiways and a large parking apron and a control tower. Several large hangars were also constructed. Buildings were ultimately utilitarian and quickly assembled. Most base buildings, not meant for long-term use, were constructed of temporary or semi-permanent materials. Although some hangars had steel frames and the occasional brick or tile brick building could be seen, most support buildings sat on concrete foundations but were of frame construction clad in little more than plywood and tarpaper. On 8 December 1941, Hattiesburg Army Air Field opened, assigned to the Third Air Force.

The first mission was antisubmarine patrols along the Gulf of Mexico coast. In early June 1942, the 21st Bombardment Group, based at Jackson Army Air Base, dispatched the 313th Bombardment Squadron flying B-25 Mitchells from the airfield. They was replaced in late June by the 113th Observation Squadron which flew light observation planes (O-49 Vigilants and O-52 Owls) until the end of July.

The 27th Bombardment Group (Light), flying A-20 Havocs arrived at Hattiesburg in mid-August. The 27th was forming in the Philippines at the time of the Attack on Pearl Harbor and without any aircraft (they were diverted to Australia), the unit's ground echelon were pressed into infantry duty and were either killed or surrendered after the Battle of Bataan. Its pilots reformed the unit in Australia, but its A-24 Dauntlesses were badly mauled during the battle of the Dutch East Indies and in New Guinea. The entire unit was withdrawn from the Southwest Pacific and reformed and reequipped in the United States. The reconstituted group trained at Hattiesburg until the end of October then were moved for final training before joining Twelfth Air Force in North Africa.

The 27th Bombardment Group was the last combat unit to be stationed at Hattiesburg, as by early 1943, purpose-built Army Airfields designed for training large units had been built in the southeast and Hattiesburg AAF was reassigned to Air Technical Service Command to become a support airfield, performing maintenance on transient aircraft and also to support the Army training units at Camp Shelby.

In early 1945 military activities were phased down, and the Air Force put Hattiesburg on standby inactive status. Return to full civil control was in April 1946.

The first airline flights were Delta DC-3s in 1948; Southern appeared for a year or two around 1951. Delta left and Southern returned in 1960, and Southern moved to the new Hattiesburg-Laurel Regional Airport in 1974.

== Facilities ==
The airport covers 420 acres (170 ha) at an elevation of 151 feet (46 m). Its one runway, 13/31, is 6,094 by 150 feet (1,857 x 46 m) asphalt.

In the year ending June 14, 2012 the airport had 39,672 aircraft operations, average 108 per day: 88% general aviation, 8% military, 3% airline, and 1% air taxi. 45 aircraft were then based at the airport: 78% single-engine, 16% multi-engine, and 7% helicopter.

== See also ==
- Mississippi World War II Army Airfields
- List of airports in Mississippi
