= Lockheed Electra =

Lockheed Electra refers to two distinct aircraft designs:

- Lockheed Model 10 Electra, a ten-passenger piston engine aircraft of the 1930s, which had two immediate variants:
  - Lockheed Model 12 Electra Junior, a six-passenger scaled-down version of the Model 10 Electra
  - Lockheed Model 14 Super Electra, a twelve-passenger scaled-up version of the Model 10 Electra
- Lockheed L-188 Electra, a 98-passenger turboprop aircraft of the 1960s
