= Stinson Field Municipal Airport =

Stinson Field Municipal Airport Columbus Army Auxiliary Field #7
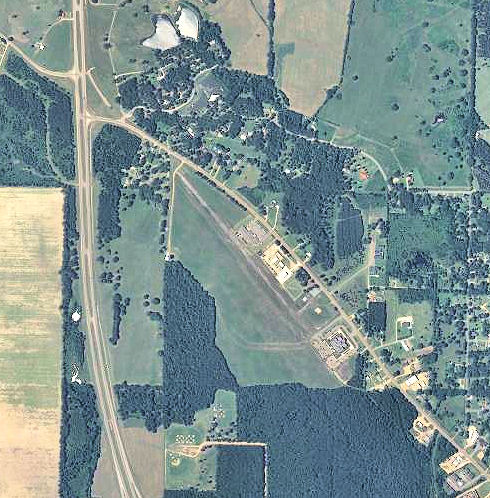
- 2006 USGS airphoto
- IATA: none; ICAO: none

Summary
- Serves: Aberdeen, Mississippi
- Coordinates: 33°51′08″N 088°35′18″W

Map
- Location of Stinson Field Municipal Airport

For the San Antonio, Texas airport see:Stinson Municipal Airport

Stinson Field Municipal Airport is a closed airport located 3 miles northwest of Aberdeen, Mississippi, United States.

== History ==
The airport was built about 1942 as an auxiliary airfield to the Army pilot school at Columbus Army Airfield. It was designated Columbus Army Auxiliary Field #7. It had an irregularly-shaped grass field, with several buildings along the road on the northeast side. It was apparently unmanned unless necessary for aircraft recovery.

It was sold after the war in 1945, and during the postwar years was used as a civil airport. It was named Stinson Field Municipal Airport in honor of Eddie A Stinson, Jr.

Later, a single 3,500' northwest/southeast runway was laid down.

The airport was closed sometime around 1995 and is now named Stinson Industrial Park. It may or may not be for sale; its current status is undetermined. A school, Mississippi National Guard Armory and a tennis court can be seen on the airfield.

== See also ==
- Mississippi World War II Army Airfields
