= Indianola Municipal Airport =

Airport in Mississippi, US

Indianola Municipal Airport (former Indianola Auxiliary Field)
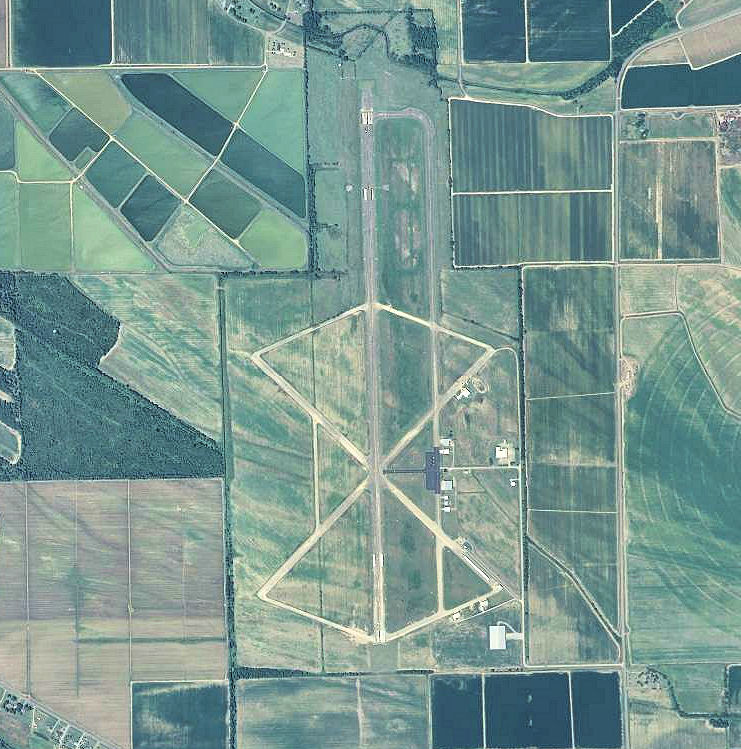
- USGS 2006 orthophoto
- IATA: none; ICAO: KIDL; FAA LID: IDL

Summary
- Airport type: Public
- Owner: City of Indianola
- Serves: Indianola, Mississippi
- Elevation AMSL: 126 ft (38 m)
- Coordinates: 33°29′09″N 090°40′44″W

Map
- Location of airport in Mississippi IDL (the United States)

Runways
Direction	Length		Surface
Direction	ft	m	Surface
18/36	7,004	2,135	Concrete

Statistics (2012)
- Aircraft operations: 21,500
- Based aircraft: 21
- Source: Federal Aviation Administration

Indianola Municipal Airport (ICAO: KIDL, FAA LID: IDL) is a public use airport in Sunflower County, Mississippi, United States. The airport is owned by the City of Indianola and located two nautical miles (4 km) northwest of the central business district.

This airport is included in the National Plan of Integrated Airport Systems for 2011–2015, which categorized it as a general aviation facility. In 2010 the airport received a $88,997 Federal Aviation Administration Airport Improvement Program grant to rehabilitate the airport beacon and to fund the installation of a water system.

Although many U.S. airports use the same three-letter location identifier for the FAA and IATA, this airport is assigned IDL by the FAA but has no designation from the IATA.

== History ==
The airport was opened during World War II, and was designated as Indianola Auxiliary Field and was used as an auxiliary training airfield supporting the Army pilot training school at Greenwood Army Airfield. It was turned over for civil use in January 1947.

== Facilities and aircraft ==
Indianola Municipal Airport covers an area of 600 acres (243 ha) at an elevation of 126 feet (38 m) above mean sea level. It has one runway designated 18/36 with a concrete surface measuring 7,004 by 150 feet (2,135 x 46 m).

For the 12-month period ending February 8, 2012, the airport had 21,500 general aviation aircraft operations, an average of 58 per day. At that time there were 21 aircraft based at this airport: 86% single-engine and 14% multi-engine.

== See also ==
- Mississippi World War II Army Airfields
- List of airports in Mississippi
