= Greenwood–Leflore Airport =

Airport in Mississippi, US

Greenwood–Leflore Airport (former Greenwood Army Airfield)
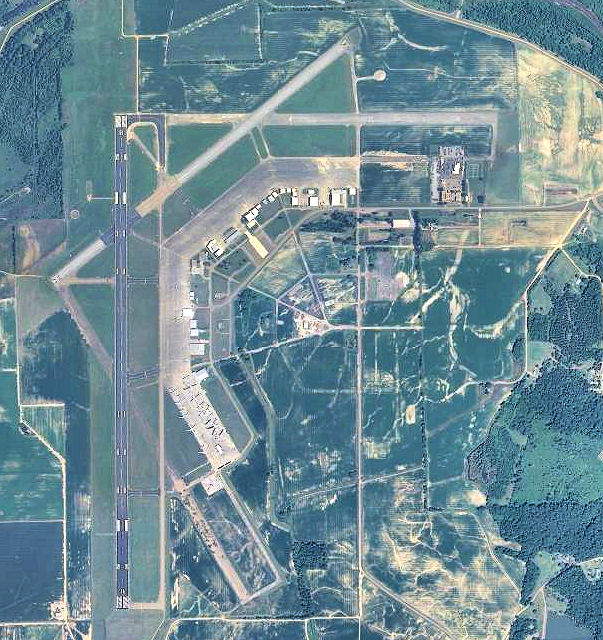
- USGS 2006 orthophoto
- IATA: GWO; ICAO: KGWO; FAA LID: GWO

Summary
- Airport type: Public
- Owner: Greenwood City & Leflore County
- Serves: Greenwood, Mississippi
- Location: Carroll County, Mississippi
- Elevation AMSL: 155 ft (47 m)
- Coordinates: 33°29′39″N 90°05′05″W
- Website: www.GWOairport.com

Map
- Location in Mississippi GWO (the United States)

Runways
Direction	Length		Surface
Direction	ft	m	Surface
18/36	6,501	1,982	Asphalt
5/23	5,011	1,527	Asphalt

Statistics (2012)
- Aircraft operations: 42,116
- Based aircraft: 57
- Source: Federal Aviation Administration

Greenwood–Leflore Airport (IATA: GWO, ICAO: KGWO, FAA LID: GWO) is a public airport located seven miles east of Greenwood, the county seat of Leflore County, Mississippi, United States. It is owned by the City of Greenwood and Leflore County, but is geographically located in Carroll County.

The National Plan of Integrated Airport Systems for 2011–2015 categorized it as a general aviation facility. There are no scheduled airline flights.

== History ==
=== World War II ===
Greenwood Airport was built by the United States Army Air Forces as a basic flight training airfield. Greenwood Army Airfield was the home of the 7th Basic Flying Training Group (BFT), and assigned to the Eastern Flying Training Command.

As built the base had four 5,000-by-150-foot (1,524 m × 46 m) runways and a 50-acre (20 ha) concrete parking apron. The pavement required was the equivalent of 65 miles (105 km) of two-lane highway. In addition, there were rail lines which were used to deliver gasoline and oil as well as coal and freight. On occasion, a troop train would venture onto the base to deliver or pick up cadets. There were 375 buildings, including; three fire stations, a 170-bed hospital, theater, chapel, recreation halls, post exchanges, mess halls, warehouses, barracks, a photo lab, parachute building, hangars, a sub depot, link trainer buildings, ground schools, a large swimming pool and myriad of other buildings necessary to run a ‘small city.’

Because of a housing shortage, the Army later added several hundred apartment units known as Greenaire Homes. They were home for many enlisted men and their dependents as well as civilian workers. The airfield had many auxiliary landing fields to support pilot training:

- Paynes Auxiliary Field 33°54′23″N 90°05′32″W
- Oxberry Auxiliary Field 33°17′09″N 90°02′49″W
- Avalon Auxiliary Field 33°38′47″N 90°04′09″W
- Curger Auxiliary Field 33°20′58″N 90°10′30″W
- Tchula Auxiliary Field 33°09′05″N 90°12′42″W
- Greenwood Municipal Airport 33°29′45″N 90°11′51″W

Greenwood AAF was also home to a contingent of Women's Army Service Pilots (WASPs). These women were rated to fly everything from B-24s to fighters. During the peak of basic training activities, the airfield averaged about 36,000 operations per month and the aircraft consumed millions of gallons of aviation gasoline annually.

The original mission of Greenwood Army Air Field (GAAF) was Basic Flight Training and the base was home to several hundred Consolidated Vultee BT-13 and BT-15 Valiants. The BT's trained thousands of fledgling military aviators. As basic training evolved, various twin-engine trainers such as the Cessna AT-17 and AT-8, and the Beechcraft AT-10 Wichita were brought into the inventory in an effort to make the transition to advanced twin-engine schools easier. This idea never fully developed and the aircraft were stored in serviceable condition. The field also had the usual complement of Noorduyn Norseman UC-64s, Cessna UC-78s and C-45 Expeditors.

On December 18, 1944 the Eastern Flying Training Command turned the field over to the Third Air Force 4th Operational Training Unit (OTU). The 590th Army Air Force Base Unit was reassigned to Greenwood AAF from Brownsville Army Airfield Texas. The arrival of the 4th OTU brought two new missions to GAAF. The BTs were replaced with AT-6 Texans and scores of fighters, including the P-51, P-47, P-38 and P-63, which were used for fighter transition training. A C-47 instrument school was also introduced and more than 20 C-47s were based at the field. Other aircraft assigned to GAAF included a B-17E Flying Fortress, several B-25 Mitchells and an L-5 Sentinel. Third Air Force operated the airfield until flight training ceased in late 1945 and the base was placed in caretaker status until being turned over to the city of Greenwood by the War Assets Administration. As late as 1948, the Army and War Assets Administration maintained a fire station and a small contingent to look after the dormant air base.

=== Postwar history ===
For the next 21 years the base was abandoned and most of the wartime buildings disappeared. In 1967, the city of Greenwood made a decision to relocate the Greenwood Municipal Airport to the abandoned Army Air Field. Runway 5/23 was lighted and placed in use. Weeds were removed from the miles of expansion joints on the otherwise intact ramp and a new rotating beacon was installed. At that time, only sixteen of the wartime structures included the old sub depot remained. At the time the airport was relocated, a new FAA Flight Service Station was constructed. Eventually, runway 18/36 was repaired and outfitted with new high-intensity runway lighting and an Instrument Landing System with MALSR. In 1989 a control tower was commissioned, and in the early 1990s runway 18/36 was lengthened to 6,503 feet and strengthened to accommodate wide-body aircraft.

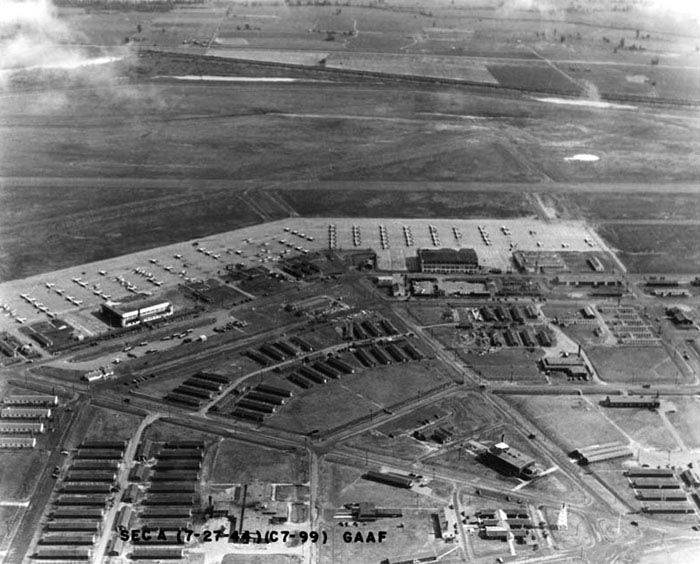
27 July 1944 aerial view of tornado damage at GAAF

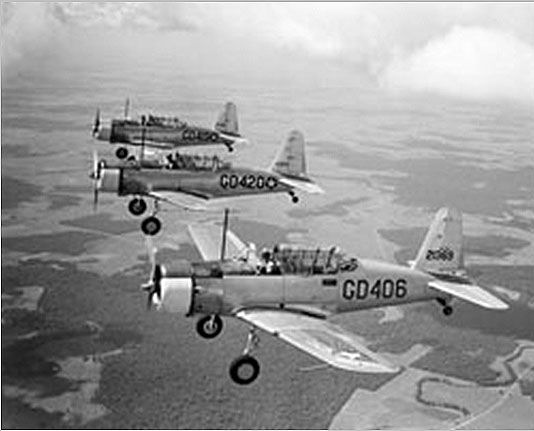
Flight of BT-13s

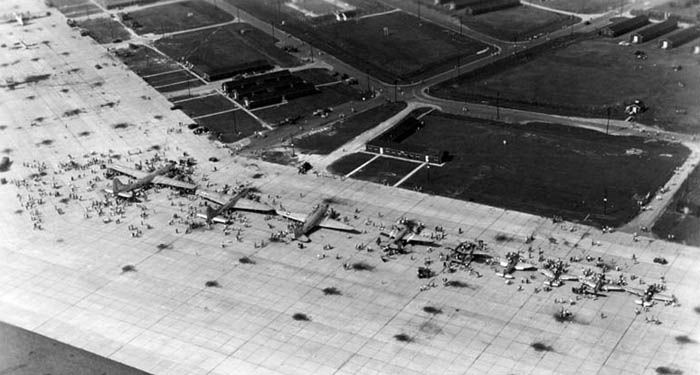
4th OTU airshow in June 1945

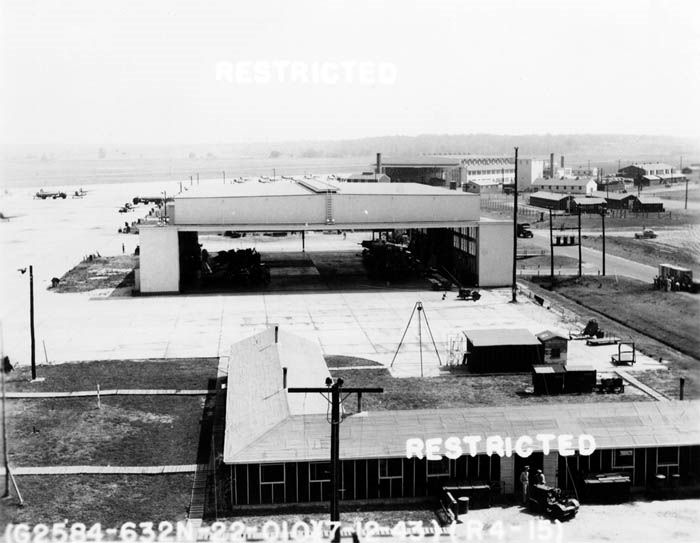
1943 view looking east from the GAAF control tower toward the PLM and Squadron Hangars

== Facilities ==
Greenwood–Leflore Airport covers 816 acres (330 ha) at an elevation of 155 feet (47 m). It has two asphalt runways: 18/36 is 6,501 by 150 feet (1,982 x 46 m); 5/23 is 5,011 by 150 feet (1,527 x 46 m).

In the year ending March 14, 2012 the airport had 42,116 aircraft operations, average 115 per day: 87% general aviation, 10% military, and 3% air taxi. 57 aircraft were then based at the airport: 53% single-engine, 21% helicopter, 16% multi-engine, 5% jet, and 5% glider.

== See also ==
- Mississippi World War II Army Airfields
- Air Transport Command
- 27th Flying Training Wing (World War II)
- List of airports in Mississippi
