= Perry County Airport =

Perry County Airport may refer to:

- Perry County Airport (Ohio) in Perry County, Ohio, United States (FAA: I86)
- James Tucker Airport in Perry County, Tennessee, United States (FAA: M15)
- Perry County Municipal Airport in Perry County, Indiana, United States (FAA: TEL)
- Richton-Perry County Airport in Perry County, Mississippi, Indiana, United States (FAA: M59)

== See also ==
- Perry Airport (disambiguation)
- Perry Municipal Airport (disambiguation)
