= Spring Creek (Lewis and Clark County, Montana) =

Stream in Montana, United States

Spring Creek Lincoln Spring Creek
- Etymology: the source of the creek-groundwater

Location
- Country: United States
- State: Montana
- District: Lewis and Clark County
- Municipality: Lincoln, Montana

Physical characteristics
- Source: groundwater
- Mouth: Keep Cool Creek
  - coordinates: 46.94969°N 112.72332°W
- Length: 5 m (16 ft)

Spring Creek is a stream in Lewis and Clark County, Montana. The creek is relatively small in size, but offers some recreational activities and natural views.

== Description ==
Spring Creek is a large but low-gradient stream. The stream is classified as a first order stream because only groundwater feeds it, no other tributaries flow into it. The creek itself is sourced specifically from the alluvial aquifer under the Lincoln Valley. The streams course begins near the Lincoln Airport. After the airport, it continues west and encompasses a windy course. The creek then flows under North Stemple Pass Avenue, and starts a small fork that eventually flows back into the creek near Hudson Lane. The creek continues the same until 1st Avenue, where the creek creates a north and south fork. The north fork does not flow back into the creek, but the south fork does near South Beaver Creek Road. The main stream continues west after creating the forks until it flows under Main Street, where it drops south near the Spring Creek RV Campground. The creek then continues northwest after the end of South Beaver Creek Road, and continues that way until its mouth, Keep Cool Creek. The stream is 5 miles long.

== Species ==
Spring Creek contains three species of fish, with one of them being native to the state of Montana. They are the brook trout, brown trout and Westslope cutthroat trout.
