= Lincoln Valley =

River valley in Montana, United States

- Blackfoot River Valley
- Blackfoot River from the Stemple Pass Bridge east of Lincoln
- Floor elevation: 4,540 feet

Geography
- Country: United States
- State: Montana
- District: Lewis and Clark County
- Population centers: Lincoln, Montana
- Coordinates: 46.961377685071234°N 112.68335712223548°W
- Lake: Keep Cool Lake

Location
- Interactive map of Lincoln Valley

Lincoln Valley, also known as the Blackfoot River Valley, is a river valley in Lewis and Clark County, Montana. The valley offers scenic views of mountains, the Blackfoot River, several forests and other recreation areas.

== History ==
Meriwether Lewis passed through the area on his return to St. Louis in 1806, following the famous "River of the Road to the Buffalo" created by Native Americans centuries before. Gold discoveries in the mid-1860s brought miners to a number of camps in the area, and Lincoln was eventually created when nearby Lincoln Gulch was abandoned in favor of the town's present location. Recreational, logging and mining activities along the Blackfoot River in the early 20th century made it a convenient commercial center. Nearby wilderness areas continue to attract visitors and residents.

In 1865, David Culp and Thomas Patterson staked a claim in what they designated Abe Lincoln Gulch in honor of the recently assassinated president. Word broke out, gold-seekers descended upon the area, and a small community soon formed at the mouth of the gulch with the abbreviated name – Lincoln.

== Geography ==
=== Surroundings ===
North of the Lincoln Valley is the Scapegoat and Bob Marshall Wilderness areas. Both areas are protected to preserve the beauty of the areas, and as a result do not allow motorized vehicles in the premises. To the east of the valley are Roger's, Stemple, and Flesher passes- part of the continental divide. On the south edge of the valley is the Blackfoot River and several small creeks such as Spring Creek and Keep Cool Creek. Additionally, but not in the valley, is the Helena-Lewis and Clark National Forest. Such water features allow for green vegetation in the summer months and recreational opportunities such as fishing and wading. Additionally, the Blackfoot River formed the valley (see next section) allowing for its current flatness.

=== Geology ===
a map of glacers and glacial lakes in the western United States

Before the Blackfoot River or surrounding features existed in the valley, the area was likely composed of several glaciers and/or glacial lakes. However, with the heating up of earth and other changes, those glaciers melted, and glacial lakes flooded, causing deoposits of various rocks to be deposited under the valley's surface. Additionally, the excess water likely caused water to either form streams and creeks, or go into the ground, which turned into several aquifers and groundwater containments such as the alluvial aquifer one that sits under the valley. Such groundwater and aquifers created streams that we can see today in the valley, such as Spring Creek, Keep Cool Creek, and others. The excess water also likely immeaditly created the Blackfoot River and surrounding streams after flooding. As a result of a new river in the area, rocks deposited by glaciers were and are now being moved and broken down, causing the flatness and heavy deposits of rocks under the valley.

== Weather ==
Lincoln has a humid continental climate (Dfb) bordering closely on a subarctic climate (Dfc). Summers are warm to hot while winters are cold and snowy, with annual average snowfall totaling 85.4 inches (217 cm).

Rogers Pass, 18 miles (29 km) northeast of Lincoln on Highway 200, is known for being the location of the coldest recorded temperature in the United States outside of Alaska. On January 20, 1954, a temperature of −70 °F (−57 °C) was recorded. Lincoln has a humid continental climate bordering on semi-arid. Snow is usually dry powder, although strong Pacific Ocean storms sometimes bring moisture-laden snow to the area. Some sources list Lincoln as having November's record low of −53 °F (−47 °C), but that never happened, Lincoln's real November record low is −45 °F (−43 °C) .

Climate data for Lincoln, Montana, 1991–2020 normals, extremes 1948–2012
Month	Jan	Feb	Mar	Apr	May	Jun	Jul	Aug	Sep	Oct	Nov	Dec	Year
Record high °F (°C)	59 (15)	60 (16)	72 (22)	84 (29)	92 (33)	94 (34)	102 (39)	102 (39)	98 (37)	84 (29)	68 (20)	55 (13)	102 (39)
Mean maximum °F (°C)	47.1 (8.4)	50.3 (10.2)	60.1 (15.6)	72.6 (22.6)	81.0 (27.2)	87.1 (30.6)	93.3 (34.1)	92.5 (33.6)	86.1 (30.1)	73.7 (23.2)	56.6 (13.7)	44.9 (7.2)	94.9 (34.9)
Mean daily maximum °F (°C)	31.7 (−0.2)	34.7 (1.5)	43.9 (6.6)	52.6 (11.4)	62.5 (16.9)	71.1 (21.7)	81.3 (27.4)	81.1 (27.3)	70.2 (21.2)	54.4 (12.4)	38.9 (3.8)	30.5 (−0.8)	54.4 (12.4)
Daily mean °F (°C)	22.0 (−5.6)	25.1 (−3.8)	32.8 (0.4)	39.7 (4.3)	47.9 (8.8)	55.6 (13.1)	62.6 (17.0)	61.4 (16.3)	52.8 (11.6)	41.5 (5.3)	29.5 (−1.4)	21.6 (−5.8)	41.0 (5.0)
Mean daily minimum °F (°C)	12.3 (−10.9)	15.4 (−9.2)	21.7 (−5.7)	26.8 (−2.9)	33.2 (0.7)	40.1 (4.5)	43.8 (6.6)	41.6 (5.3)	35.4 (1.9)	28.5 (−1.9)	20.0 (−6.7)	12.8 (−10.7)	27.6 (−2.4)
Mean minimum °F (°C)	−17.4 (−27.4)	−14.6 (−25.9)	−1.7 (−18.7)	13.6 (−10.2)	21.6 (−5.8)	28.9 (−1.7)	33.4 (0.8)	29.7 (−1.3)	21.2 (−6.0)	9.1 (−12.7)	−3.5 (−19.7)	−16.0 (−26.7)	−28.3 (−33.5)
Record low °F (°C)	−48 (−44)	−44 (−42)	−34 (−37)	−8 (−22)	8 (−13)	19 (−7)	24 (−4)	21 (−6)	6 (−14)	−13 (−25)	−45 (−43)	−48 (−44)	−48 (−44)
Average precipitation inches (mm)	1.49 (38)	2.30 (58)	1.25 (32)	1.46 (37)	1.99 (51)	2.62 (67)	0.82 (21)	1.04 (26)	1.33 (34)	1.63 (41)	1.35 (34)	1.49 (38)	18.77 (477)
Average snowfall inches (cm)	15.1 (38)	10.0 (25)	7.4 (19)	3.2 (8.1)	1.1 (2.8)	1.2 (3.0)	0.0 (0.0)	0.0 (0.0)	0.5 (1.3)	2.1 (5.3)	9.5 (24)	16.5 (42)	66.6 (168.5)
Average extreme snow depth inches (cm)	12.4 (31)	12.1 (31)	10.1 (26)	4.3 (11)	0.9 (2.3)	0.4 (1.0)	0.0 (0.0)	0.0 (0.0)	0.2 (0.51)	1.2 (3.0)	4.5 (11)	9.6 (24)	17.0 (43)
Average precipitation days (≥ 0.01 in)	9.0	8.3	9.3	8.8	11.0	12.3	7.4	6.6	6.9	8.5	8.6	8.1	104.8
Average snowy days (≥ 0.1 in)	6.1	5.0	4.4	1.5	0.4	0.2	0.0	0.0	0.1	1.0	4.7	6.7	30.1
Source 1: NOAA
Source 2: National Weather Service (mean maxima/minima, snow/snow days/snow depth 1981–2010)

== Communities ==
The Lincoln Valley contains one community – Lincoln, Montana, a CDP.

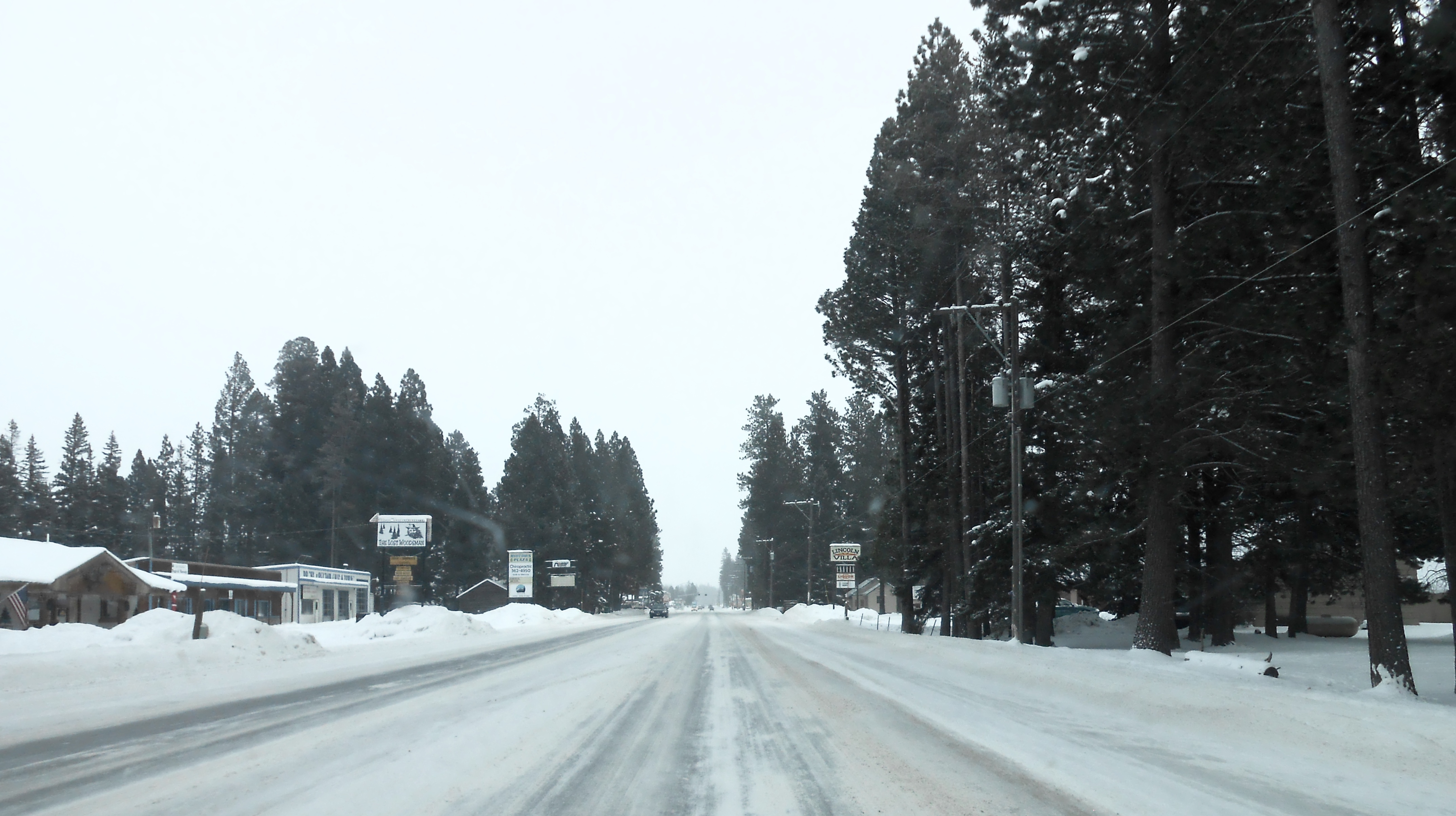
Lincoln, Montana

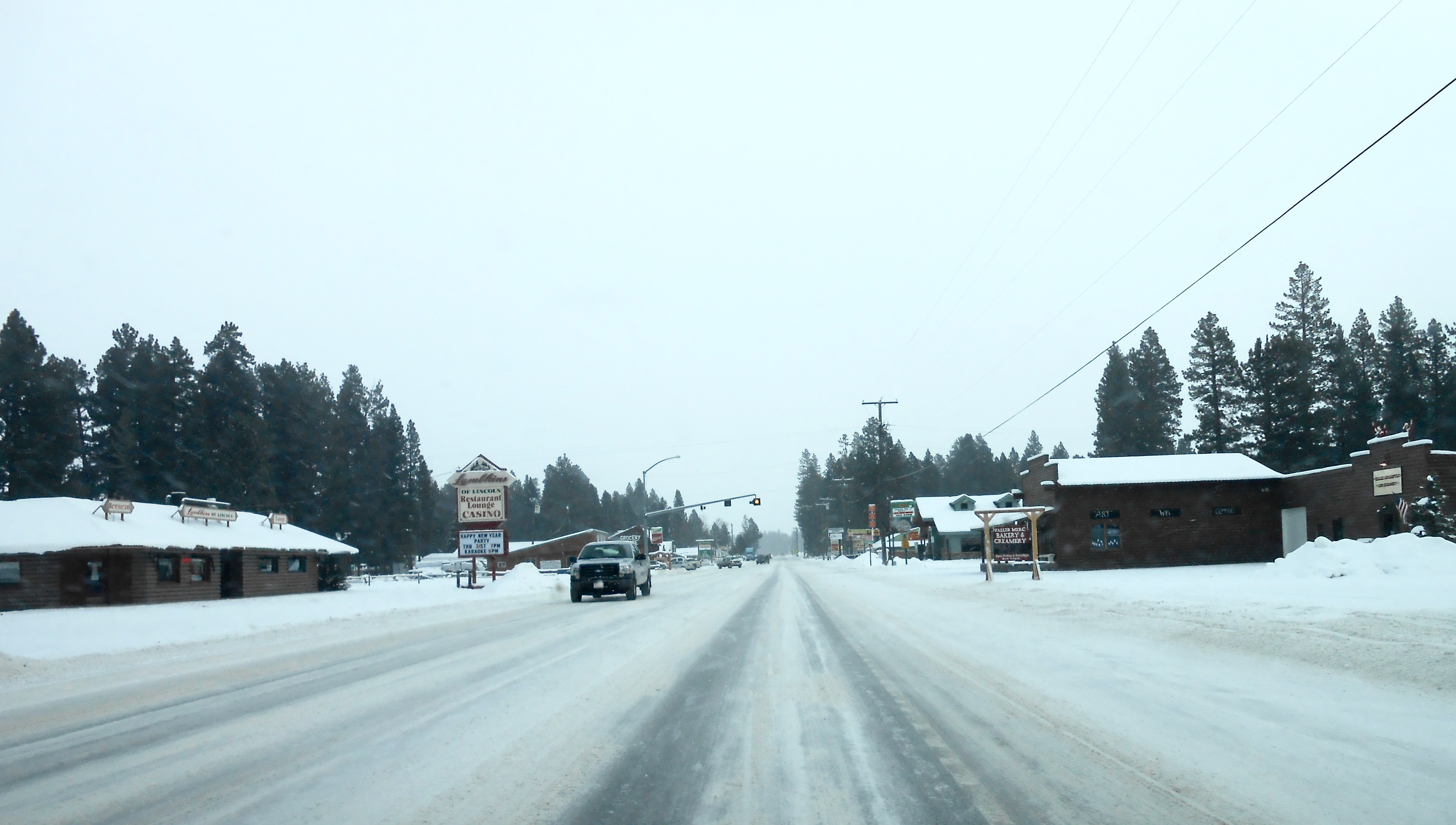
Downtown Lincoln, Montana

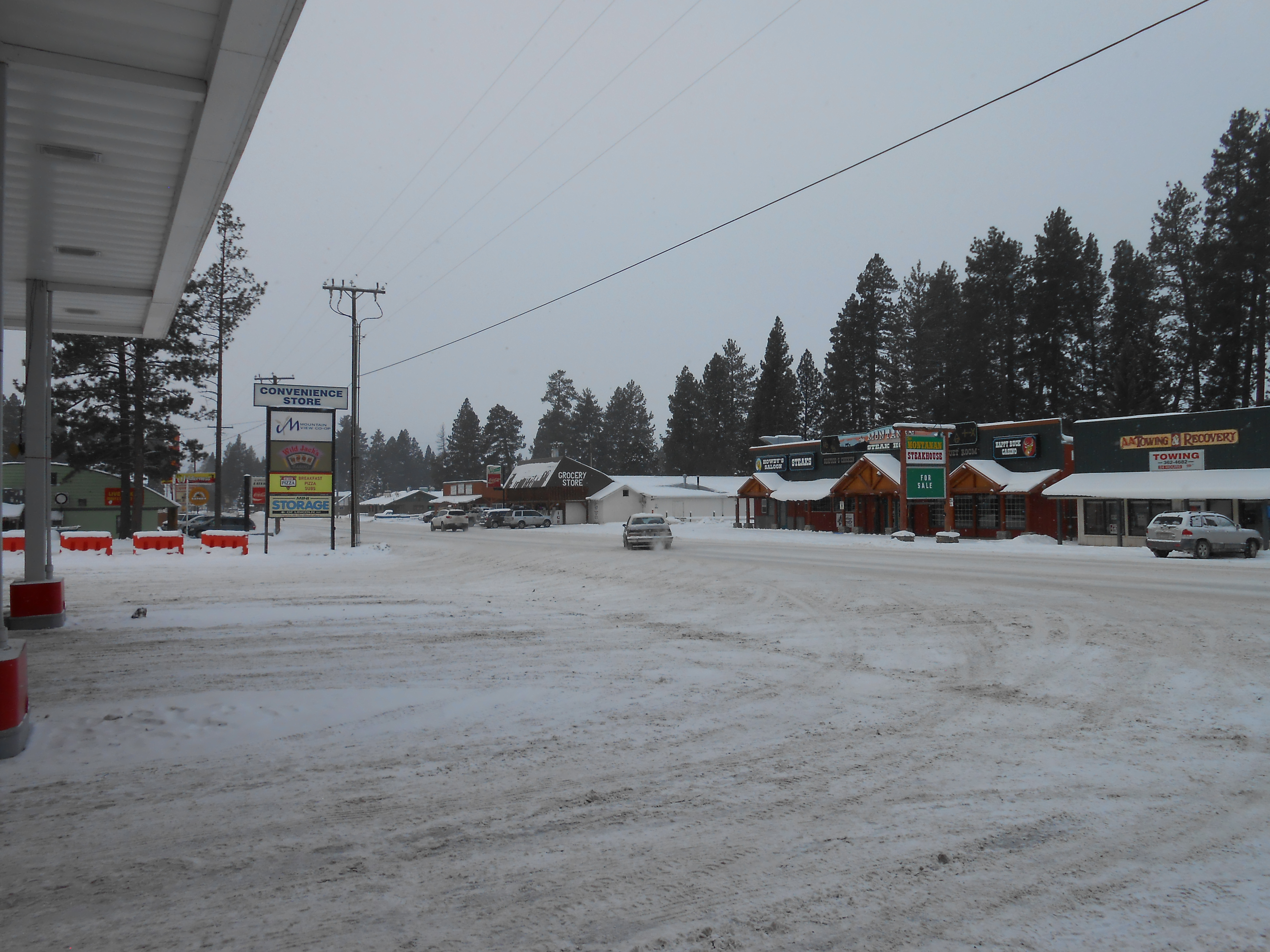
Lincoln's main street businesses

== Recreation ==
=== Outdoor events ===
Lincoln, Montana and the Lincoln Valley offer a wide-variety of activities year-round. In the winter, snowmobiling and sled dog races are common, including the well-known Race to the Sky race. In the spring and summer, photography, sightseeing at Sculptures of the Wild and other areas, hiking, paddleboarding and fishing (especially fly fishing) are common in creeks and the Blackfoot River. In the fall, hunting is easily accessible with various animal species such as deer, elk and moose.

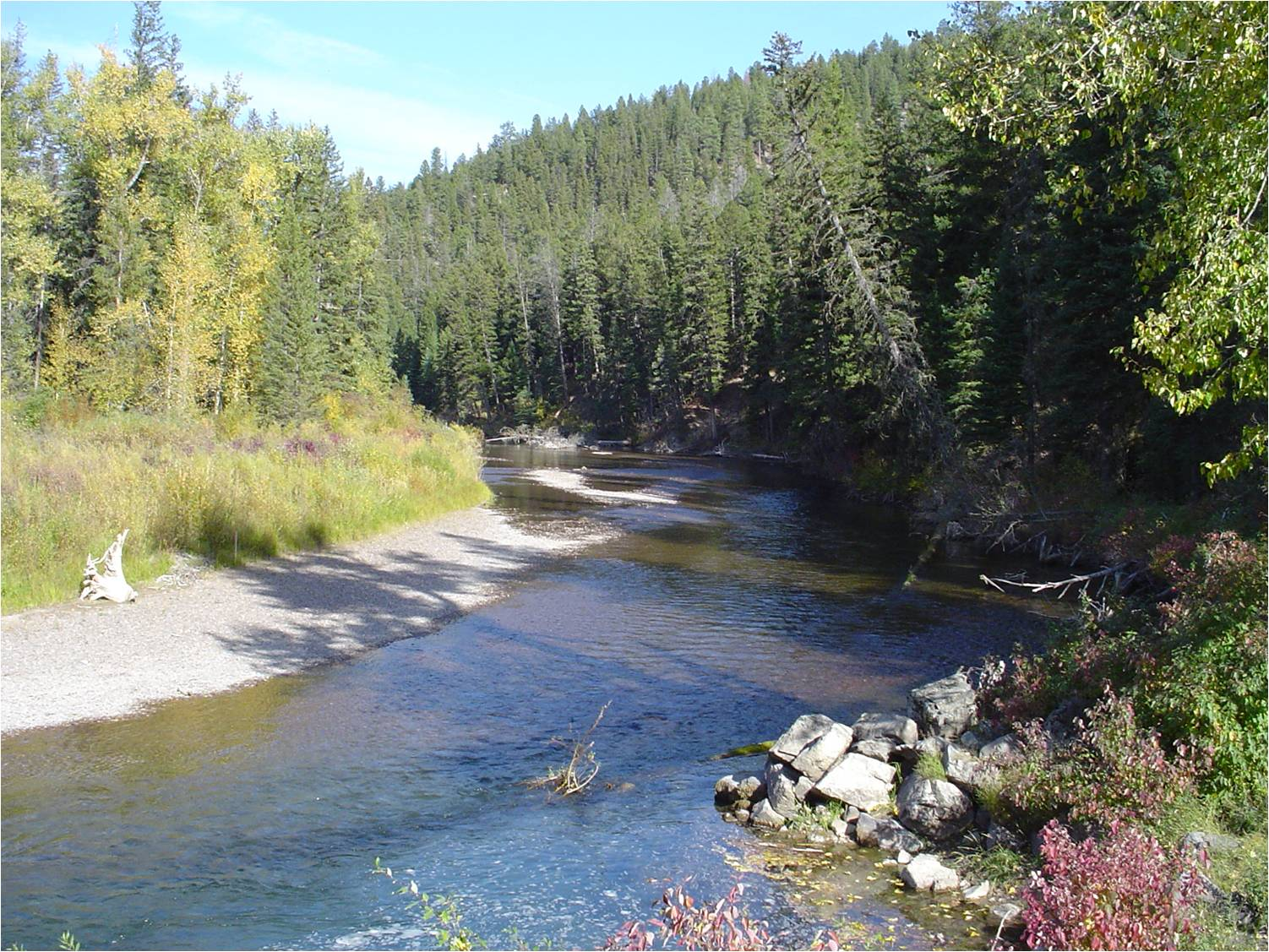
The Blackfoot River

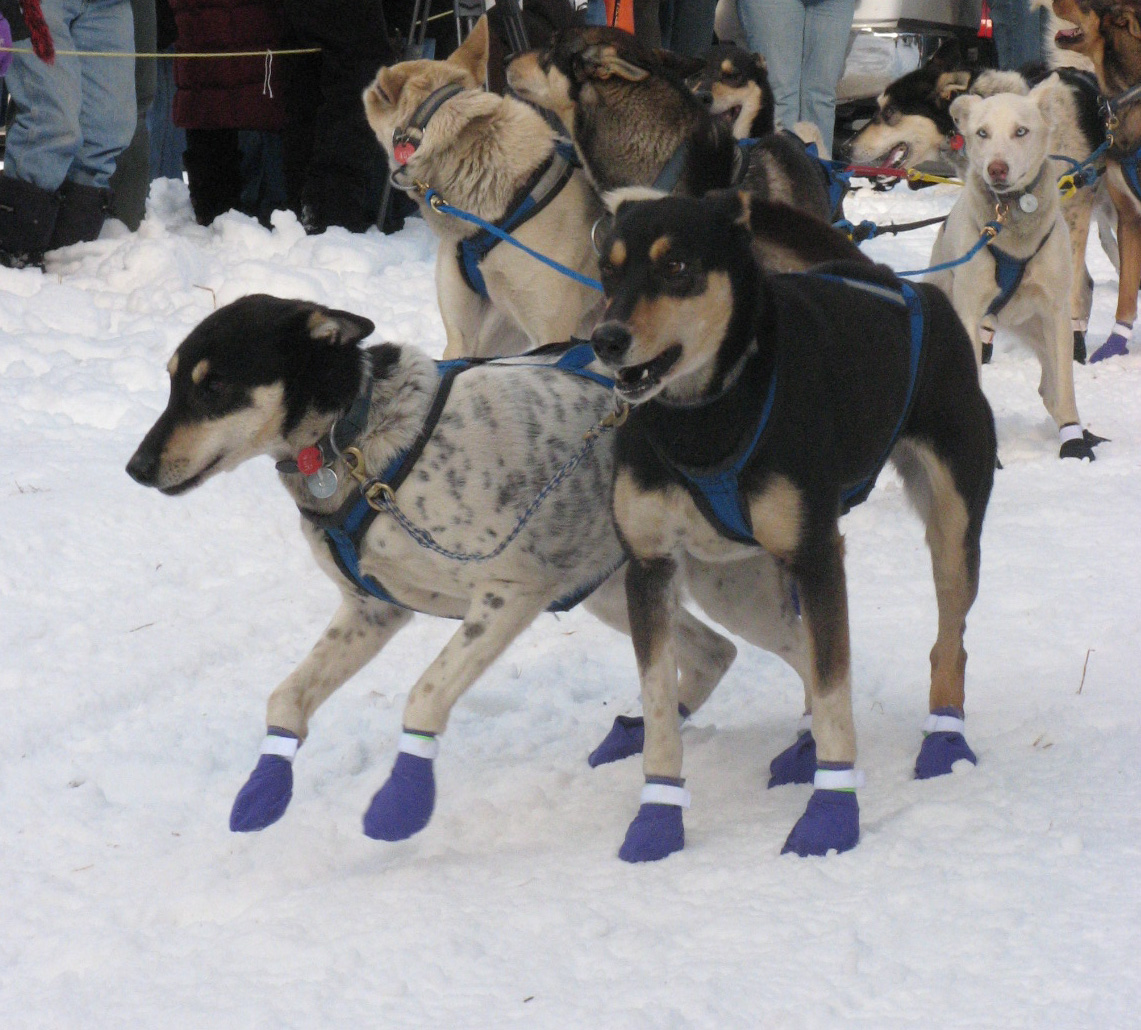
Sled dogs at a Race to the Sky event

=== Annual events ===
The majority of events based in Lincoln are in the summer. In early July is the Lincoln Rodeo and parade which celebrates the history of the United States and of Lincoln. In mid July is the Hooper Park Flea Market and in mid August is the Lincoln Art and Music Festival.
