= Arrastra Creek =

Arrastra Creek may refer to:

- Arrastra Creek (Montana), a tributary of the Blackfoot River
- Arrastra Creek (Oregon), a tributary of Wagner Creek
