= Montgomery Airport (disambiguation) =

Montgomery Airport may refer to:

- Montgomery Regional Airport in Montgomery, Alabama, United States (FAA: MGM)
- Montgomery Field Airport in San Diego, California, United States (FAA: MYF)
- Virginia Tech Montgomery Executive Airport in Blacksburg, Virginia, United States (FAA: BCB)
- G. V. Montgomery Airport in Forest, Mississippi, United States (FAA: 2M4)

== See also ==
- Montgomery County Airport (disambiguation)
