= Arrastra Creek (Montana) =

Stream in Lewis and Clark and Powell counties, Montana

- Etymology: named after an arrastra, a Spanish-American stone mill used to crush gold and silver

Location
- Country: Lewis and Clark County
- State: Powell County, Montana

Physical characteristics
- Source: Arrastra Pond
- Mouth: Blackfoot River (Montana)
  - location: near Helmville, Montana and Lincoln, Montana
  - coordinates: 46.94163°N 112.90558°W
- Length: 13 miles

Basin features
- Waterbodies: Arrastra Pond
- Waterfalls: N/A
- Bridges: N/A

Arrastra Creek and Arrastra Creek Trail is a stream in Lewis and Clark and Powell counties in the U.S. State of Montana. The creek offers fishing and hiking opportunities.

== Stream Course ==
Arrastra Creek begins north of Montana State Highway 200 at Arrastra Pond in Lewis and Clark County. The creek continues southwest weaving in and out of Lewis and Clark and Powell counties. The creek then finally stays in Powell county continuing southwest. It then turns more sharply southwest and joins 5 unamed streams. It then flows more sharply east flowing under Arrastra Creek Road and joining two unnamed streams. It then continues southwest, joing an unnamed creek, flowing under Montana State Highway 200, and then into its mouth, the Blackfoot River.

== Stream Details ==
Arrastra Creek is the 2nd largest and coldest tribuatry to the Blackfoot River and flows for 13 miles, with most of its course being through public land.

== Arrastra Creek Trail ==
Arrastra Creek Trail is a very beginner friendly/easy trail. The trail contains a total roundtrip distance of 9 miles and a total elevation gain of 400 feet. The trail itself has very few inclines, and has many scenic offerings such as two crossings of Arrastra Creek, Douglas Fir Trees, and other vegetation and wildlife (see species). The trail begins as a road and ends in the Scapegoat Wilderness at Huckleberry Pass. Hikers should note that the creek crossings do not contain bridges.

== Species ==
Arrastra Creek contains 6 species of fish, with 4 of them being native to the state of Montana. They are the Brook Trout, Brown Trout, Bull Trout, Longnose Sucker, Mountain Whitefish, and Westslope Cutthroat Trout. The creek is known for being one of few creeks in the area to support moderate numbers of Bull Trout and Westslope Cutthroat Trout.

== See Also ==
- Lincoln, Montana
- Missoula, Montana
- Keep Cool Creek
- Spring Creek
