= UOX =

UOX may refer to:

- Urate oxidase, a gene
- IATA code for University-Oxford Airport
- Uranium oxide (UOx)
