= Fixed-base operator =

Company offering air-side aviation services at an airport

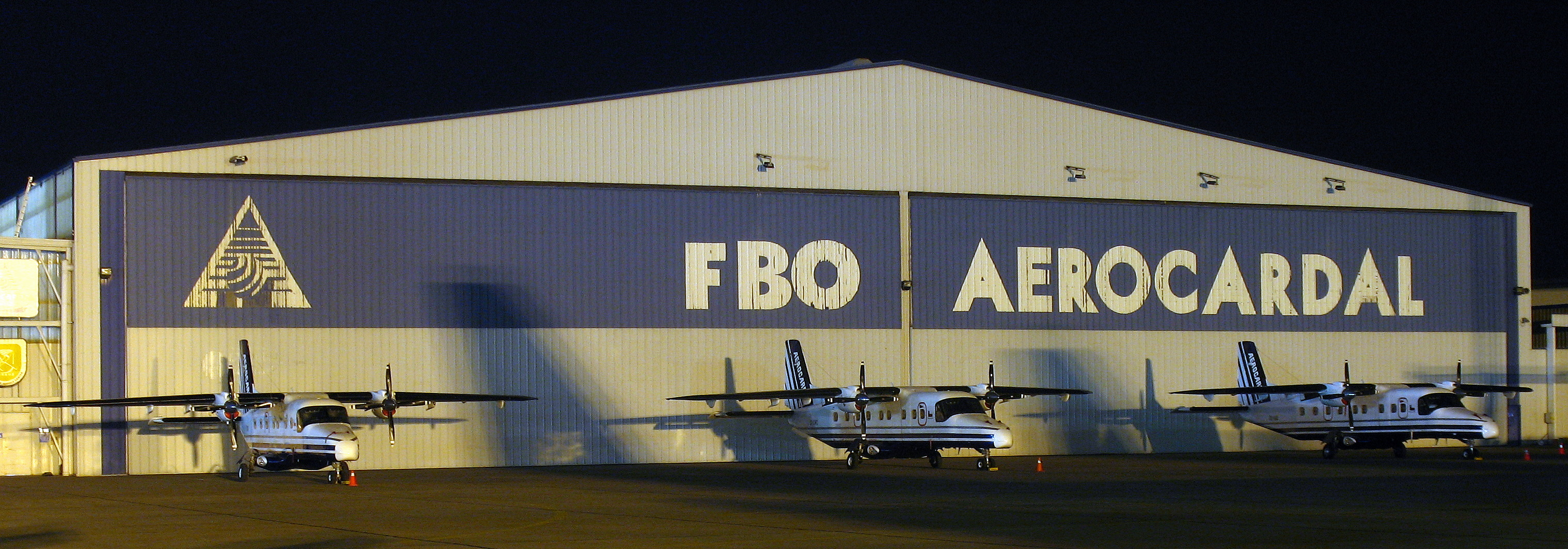
Three Dornier 228s of Aerocardal at the airline's Arturo Merino Benítez International Airport base in Republic of Chile

A fixed-base operator (FBO) is an organization granted the right by an airport to operate at the airport and provide aeronautical services such as fueling, hangaring, tie-down, parking, aircraft rental, aircraft maintenance, flight instruction, and similar services. In common practice, an FBO is the primary provider of support services to general aviation operators at a public-use airport and is on land leased from the airport, or, in rare cases, adjacent property as a "through the fence operation". In many smaller airports serving general aviation in remote or modest communities, the town itself may provide fuel services and operate a basic FBO facility. Most FBOs doing business at airports of high to moderate traffic volume are non-governmental organizations, either privately or publicly held companies.

Though the term fixed-base operator originated in the United States, the term has become more common in the international aviation industry as business and corporate aviation has grown. The term has not been officially defined as an international standard, but there have been uses of the term in International Civil Aviation Organization (ICAO) publications such as Implementing the Global Aviation Safety Roadmap (2008).

== History of the term ==
After the end of World War I in November 1918, civil aviation in the United States was primarily unregulated and made up of "barnstormers", transient pilots flying inexpensive military surplus aircraft from city to city and often landing in farm fields on the outskirts of a town because airports were scarce at that time. The traveling aviators offered airplane rides and aerobatic flight demonstrations frequently collaborating as "flying circuses" by performing impromptu airshows for the townsfolk and charging whatever the local economic conditions would allow. As a result, mechanics and early flight instructors moved around with the aircraft and had no established business in any location.

With passage of the Air Commerce Act of 1926 and its resulting requirements for the licensing of pilots, aircraft maintenance requirements, and regulations in training standards, the transient nature of civil aviation was curtailed. The pilots and mechanics who made their living on the road began establishing permanent businesses at the growing number of airports appearing throughout the United States. These were termed fixed-base operations to distinguish them from the transient businesses that had been common prior to 1926.

== Services offered ==
Fixed-base operators support a wide range of aeronautical activities which may include one or more of the following:

- Sale of aviation fuel – piston aircraft fuel (avgas) and/or turbine aircraft fuel (Jet-A or Jet A-1)
- Line services for general aviation aircraft
- Air taxi and air charter operations
- Scheduled or nonscheduled air carrier services and support services
- Pilot training
- Aircraft rental and sightseeing
- Aircraft sales and service
- Aircraft storage (tie-down or hangar)
- Repair and aircraft maintenance
- Sale of aircraft parts
- Aerial photography
- Crop dusting and aerial applications
- Aerial advertising and aerial survey

Though not required, fixed-base operators generally also provide at least basic auxiliary services to pilots, flight crew, and passengers such as restroom facilities, telecommunication services, and waiting areas. General aviation FBOs (commonly in the U.S.) sometimes provide courtesy cars that can be used for free or little cost by flight crews mostly for short trips from the airport and the surrounding city area. Larger and better equipped FBOs may additionally offer food vending and restaurant facilities, ground transportation arrangements by taxi/limousine, shuttle van, flight planning and weather information areas (computer- or telephone-based), rest lounges and showers, aviation supplies shop (selling navigation charts, manuals, or in-flight comfort items), access to in-flight catering, and accommodations reservations or concierge services for both crew and passengers through a customer service representative (CSR).

== Around the world ==
=== Canada ===
At medium and large airports, FBOs are typically affiliated with one of the major aviation fuel suppliers and display the fuel supplier's sign prominently. At smaller airports, the FBO is often the airport operator, such as Alpha Aviation at Boundary Bay Airport (CZBB) or a flying club.

=== United States ===
Within the United States, the Federal Aviation Administration (FAA) regulates some activities that may comprise an FBO such as the authorization of repair stations, flight training, and air taxi/air carrier services. However, there are no federal regulatory standards covering all FBOs. The FAA has defined an FBO as "a commercial entity providing aeronautical services such as fueling, maintenance, storage, ground and flight instruction, etc., to the public."

The United States Department of Transportation, in cooperation with the FAA, has the duty of establishing minimum standards for commercial aeronautical activities and recommends implementation of these standards by the airport operator or agency, commonly referred to as the airport sponsor. The United States FBO Industry is represented nationally by the National Air Transportation Association or NATA, but is also partly represented by both the National Business Aviation Association (NBAA) and the Aircraft Owners and Pilots Association (AOPA).

The number of U.S. businesses meeting the minimum criteria as an FBO is 3,138 as of April 2009 according to a survey conducted by Aviation Resource Group International (ARGI). The number has decreased since the 2006 survey, which counted 3,346 FBOs.
