= Union County Airport =

Union County Airport may refer to:

- Union County Airport (Ohio) in Union County, Ohio, United States (FAA: MRT)
- Union County Airport (South Carolina), also known as Troy Shelton Field, in Union County, South Carolina, United States (FAA: 35A)
- La Grande/Union County Airport, in Union County, Oregon, United States (FAA: LGD)
- New Albany-Union County Airport, in Union County, Mississippi, United States (FAA: M72)
