= Airpark =

Fly-in living community

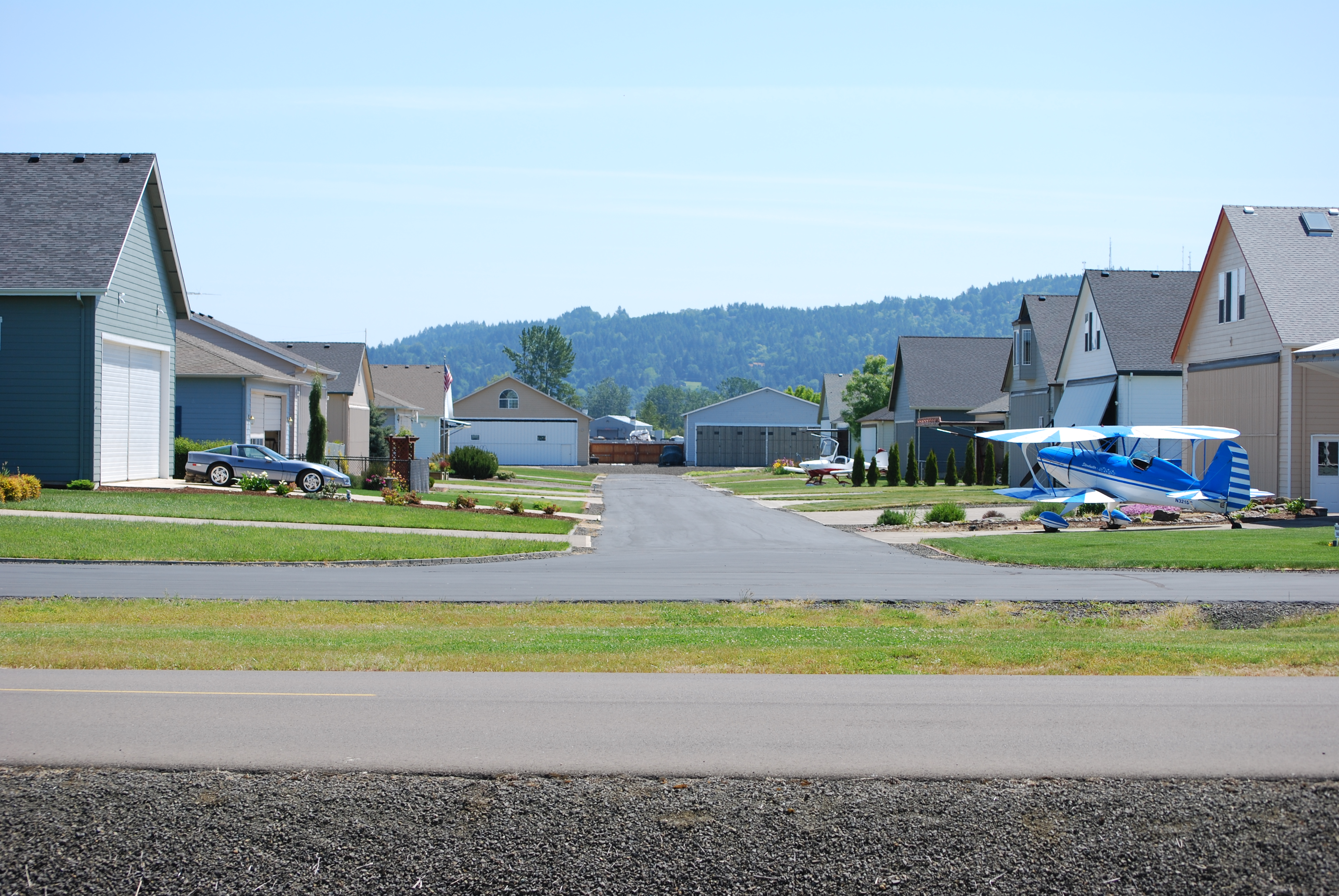
Hangar homes at Independence State Airport.

A residential airpark (also spelled air park) is a "fly-in community" specifically designed around an airport where the residents own their privately owned airplanes which they park in their hangars, usually attached to the home or integrated into their home. A residential airpark features one or more runways with homes adjacent to the runway or taxiways. Many fly-in communities feature a variety of amenities, such as golf course, equestrian facilities and more. Residential airparks are usually privately owned and restricted to use by the property owners and their invited guests. Most do not include commercial operations or businesses. The communities have also become a niche real estate market, with some firms dedicated solely to these developments.

The Living With Your Plane Association estimates that there are at least 426 residential airparks in the United States. Florida is estimated to have 52 airparks, followed by Washington with 50, California with 28, and Oregon with 23.

== History ==
Ideas for airparks existed as early as 1944 and the first airpark was Sierra Sky Park in Fresno, California, established in 1946.

The paradigm was criticized by the FAA in 2010 as potentially hampering airport expansion. As a result, the agency proposed ceasing issuing federal grants to facilities that allowed it.

== Notable airparks ==
=== Australia ===
- Rylstone Aerodrome (New South Wales)
- White Gum Airpark (Western Australia)

=== Canada ===
- Calgary/Okotoks Air Park (Calgary, Alberta)

=== South Africa ===
- Zandspruit Bush & Aero Estate (Hoedspruit, Limpopo)

=== Sweden ===
- Siljansnäs Airpark (Dalarna, Sweden)

=== United States ===
- Aero Estates Airpark (Lake Palestine, Texas)
- Dayton Valley Airpark (Dayton/Carson City, Nevada)
- Pegasus Airpark (Queen Creek, Arizona)
- Carmel Valley Airport (Carmel Valley, California)
- Cameron Airpark (Cameron Park, California)
- Sierra Sky Park Airport (Fresno, California)
- Wellington Aero Club (Wellington, Florida)
- Tailwinds Airpark (Jupiter Farms, Florida)
- Pine Mountain Lake Airport (Groveland, California)
- Ridge Landing Airpark (Frostproof, Florida)
- Spruce Creek Airport (Port Orange, Florida)
- Greystone Airport / Jumbolair Aviation Estates (Ocala, Florida)
- Independence State Airport (Independence, Oregon)
- Chandelle Aviation Estates (Greer, South Carolina)
- Big South Fork Airpark (Oneida, Tennessee)
- Frontier Airpark (Marysville, Washington)
- Mountain Air (Burnsville, North Carolina)
- Alpine Airpark (Alpine, Wyoming)
- Waunakee Airport (Waunakee, Wisconsin)
- Hernando Village Airpark (Hernando, Mississippi)
- Meadow Creek Airpark (Monee, Illinois)
- Naper Aero Club (Naperville, Illinois)
- Brookridge Airpark (Downers Grove, Illinois)

== See also ==
- Aerodrome
- Air taxi
- eVTOL
- Heliport
- Highway strip
- Joint-use airport
- List of shortest runways
- Naval outlying landing field
- Non-towered airport
- Pilot-controlled lighting
- Satellite airfield
- STOLport
- Through the fence operation
