= Lincoln County Airport (disambiguation) =

Lincoln County Airport may refer to:

- Lincoln County Airport in Panaca, Nevada, United States (FAA: 1L1)
- Lincolnton-Lincoln County Regional Airport in Lincolnton, North Carolina, United States (FAA: IPJ)
- Brookhaven-Lincoln County Airport in Brookhaven, Mississippi, United States (FAA: 1R7)
- Marv Skie-Lincoln County Airport in Tea, South Dakota, United States (FAA: Y14)

== See also ==
- Lincoln Airport (disambiguation)
- Lincoln Municipal Airport (disambiguation)
- Lincoln Regional Airport (disambiguation)
