= Crosby Municipal Airport =

Crosby Municipal Airport may refer to:

- Crosby Municipal Airport (Mississippi) in Crosby, Mississippi, United States (FAA: C71)
- Crosby Municipal Airport (North Dakota) in Crosby, North Dakota, United States (FAA: D50)
