= S69 =

S69 may refer to:

- S69 (Long Island bus)
- County Route S69 (Bergen County, New Jersey)
- Expressway S69 (Poland)
- GER Class S69, a British steam locomotive
- HMS Auriga (S69), a submarine of the Royal Navy
- Lincoln Airport (Montana), in Lewis and Clark County, Montana, United States
- Ngarrindjeri language
- Sikorsky S-69, an American experimental helicopter
