= Lincoln Airport =

Lincoln Airport may refer to:

- Lincoln Airport (Montana) in Lincoln, Montana, United States (FAA: S69)
- Lincoln Airport (Nebraska) in Lincoln, Nebraska, United States (FAA: LNK)
- Abraham Lincoln Capital Airport in Springfield, Illinois

== See also ==
- Lincoln Regional Airport (disambiguation)
- Lincoln Municipal Airport (disambiguation)
- Lincoln County Airport (disambiguation)
