= Perry Municipal Airport =

Perry Municipal Airport may refer to:

- Perry Municipal Airport (Iowa), in Perry, Iowa, United States (FAA: PRO)
- Perry Municipal Airport (Oklahoma), in Perry, Oklahoma, United States (FAA: F22)
- Perry County Municipal Airport in Tell City, Indiana, United States (FAA: TEL)

== See also ==
- Perry Airport (disambiguation)
- Perry County Airport (disambiguation)
