= Charleston Airport (disambiguation) =

Charleston International Airport (FAA: CHS) serves Charleston, South Carolina, United States, and is one of the busiest airports in the Southeast.

Charleston Airport may also refer to:

- Charleston Executive Airport, a general aviation airport serving Charleston, South Carolina, United States (FAA: JZI)
- Charleston Municipal Airport, serving Charleston, Mississippi, United States (FAA: 09M)
- Coles County Memorial Airport, serving Mattoon / Charleston, Illinois, United States (FAA: MTO)
- Mississippi County Airport, serving Charleston, Missouri, United States (FAA: CHQ)
- Yeager Airport, serving Charleston, West Virginia, United States (FAA: CRW)
