= Ralph M. Sharpe Airport =

- IATA: none; ICAO: none; FAA LID: 30M

Summary
- Airport type: Public use
- Owner: Shawnee Sharpe
- Serves: Tunica, Mississippi
- Elevation AMSL: 195 ft / 59 m
- Coordinates: 34.65743°N 90.37654°W

Map
- Location of airport in Mississippi 30M (the United States)

Runways
Direction	Length		Surface
Direction	ft	m	Surface
1/19	2,508	764	Asphalt/turf

Statistics (2010)
- Aircraft operations: 3,040
- Based aircraft: 2
- Source: Federal Aviation Administration

Ralph M. Sharpe Airport (FAA LID: 30M) is a privately owned, public use airport in Tunica County, Mississippi, United States. It is located two nautical miles (4 km) south of the central business district of Tunica.

Formerly known as Tunica Airport, it should not be confused with the larger airport known officially as Tunica Municipal Airport (FAA: UTA), which is located 1 mile (2 km) east of the center of town.

== Facilities and aircraft ==
Ralph M. Sharpe Airport covers an area of 10 acres (4 ha) at an elevation of 195 feet (59 m) above mean sea level. It has one runway designated 1/19 with an asphalt and turf surface measuring 2,508 by 80 feet (764 x 24 m).

For the 12-month period ending December 2, 2010, the airport had 3,040 general aviation aircraft operations, an average of 253 per month. At that time there were two single-engine aircraft based at this airport.

== See also ==
- List of airports in Mississippi
