= Perry Airport =

Perry Airport may refer to:

- Perry-Foley Airport in Perry, Florida, United States (FAA: 40J)
- Perry-Houston County Airportin Perry, Georgia, United States (FAA: PXE)
- Perry-Warsaw Airport in Perry, New York, United States (FAA: 01G)

== See also ==
- Perry County Airport (disambiguation)
- Perry Municipal Airport (disambiguation)
