= Zandspruit Bush & Aero Estate =

Project
- Opening date: February 2011
- Developer: Zandspruit Estates
- Architect: Förtsch and Associates
- Operator: Zandspruit Estate Home Owners Association
- Website: www.zandspruit.co.za

Location
- Interactive map of Zandspruit Bush & Aero Estate
- Coordinates: 24°22′22.2″S 30°55′55.5″E
- Location: Hoedspruit, Limpopo Province, South Africa.
- Address: Die Rijshuys. Hoedspruit, Limpopo. South Africa.

Zandspruit Bush & Aero Estate is a 1 000 ha secure living wildlife estate situated 2 kilometres (1.2 mi) from the town of Hoedspruit, 30 kilometres (19 mi) from the Blyde River Canyon, and 70 kilometres (43 mi) from the Kruger National Park, in the Limpopo Province of South Africa. It is the first development in the world to combine a residential airpark with a game reserve.

The area is part of the UNESCO Kruger to Canyons Biosphere. The seasonal Sandspruit River runs through the estate for 6.5 km, which is surrounded by the Klein Drakensberg Mountains. The estate incorporates a paved 1 000m private airstrip, with hangar facilities for residents and owners.

== Development ==
350 ha of the 1 000 ha estate has been allocated for residential development, with three African home design styles permitted: Modern Pavilion; Traditional Farm House; and Thatch.

Stands range in size from 4 000m2 to 15 000m2, and offer a range of bush, mountain and river panoramas.

Of the 200 full title deed stands 38 are situated along the 1 000 m paved runway, enabling owners to incorporate an aircraft hangar into, or adjacent to, their homes.

== Future development ==
Future developments for the estate include a 4 star Safari Resort Hotel Restaurant and Spa, the Zandspruit Village Shopping & Entertainment Centre, the Zandspruit Equestrian Centre, and the Zandhaven Retirement & Lifestyle Village.

== Wildlife and Wilderness Area ==
Of the 1 000ha estate, 650ha remains as a natural wilderness area.

Zandspruit is not a Big 5 reserve.

The Acacia Combretum bushveld reserve is stocked with free roaming African plains game such as: giraffe; kudu; wildebeest; waterbuck; duiker; bushbuck; impala; zebra; nyala; warthog and reedbuck.

The reserve has a number of dams, a bird hide, walking, cycling and horse riding trails, viewing points and sundowner spots.

The area is rich in bird life, including waxbills, eagles, vultures and owls. The original hunting camp on the Sandspruit riverbed has been restored to become the Zandspruit Bush Camp, a modern bush camp and boma with braai facilities and a swimming pool.

== Location and access ==
Zandspruit Bush & Aero Estate is 2km west of Hoedspruit.

Zandspruit Estate has direct tar road access from Gauteng, Nelspruit and Phalaborwa, and is approximately 450 km north east of Johannesburg, 170 km north of Nelspruit, and 2 km west of Hoedspruit.

Eastgate Airport (FAHS) is 15 km from Zandspruit Estate.

Owner pilots can make use of the 1 000 m paved Zandspruit runway.

Zandspruit is 30 km from the Blyde River Canyon and 70 km from Kruger National Parks’ Orpen Gate.

== Zandspruit Airstrip (ZBAE) ==
Zandspruit Bush & Aero Estate
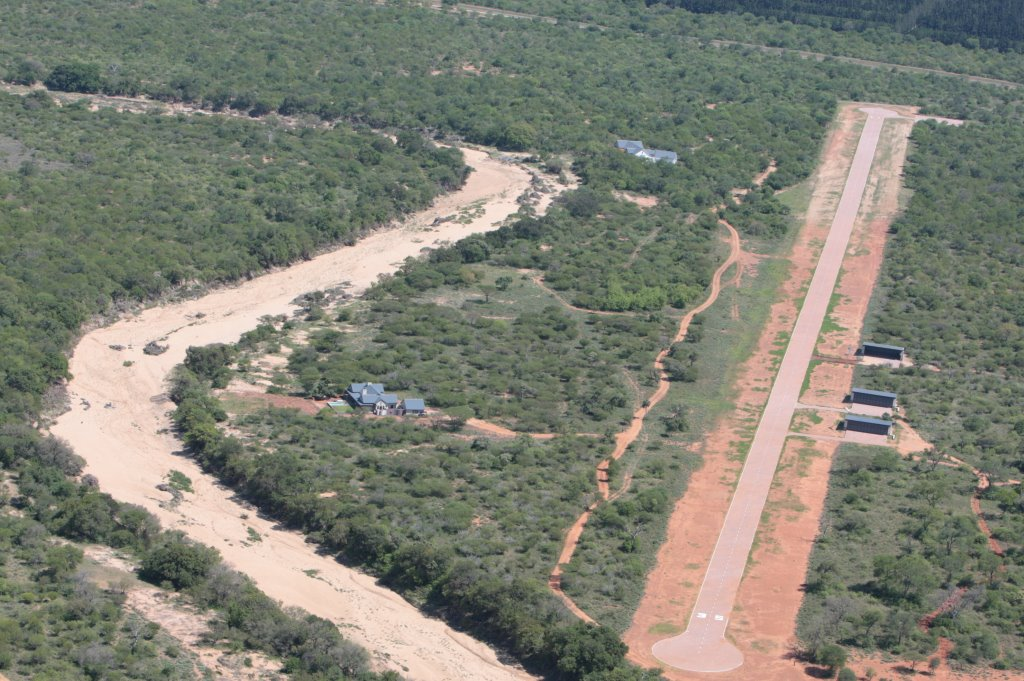
- IATA: none; ICAO: none; GPS: 24°22′22.2″S 30°55′55.5″E

Summary
- Airport type: Private
- Owner/Operator: Zandspruit Estate
- Location: 2km outside of Hoedspruit
- Elevation AMSL: 1,700 ft / 518 m
- Coordinates: 24°22′22.2″S 30°55′55.5″E
- Website: www.zandspruit.co.za
- Interactive map of Zandspruit Bush & Aero Estate

Runways
Direction	Length		Surface
Direction	ft	m	Surface
17 / 35	3,280	1,000	Paved

The 1 000m paved, private airstrip is available for owners and residents of Zandspruit. Visiting pilots need to request the latest pilot information as well as obtain permission and send through a completed indemnity form at least 24 hours in advance of arrival.

Zandspruit Airstrip details: 17 / 35 1000 x 10 m paved. ZBAE - S24°22'22.2" E30°55'55.5"

The closest alternative airfield is Hoedspruit Civil, situated 2 km north east from Zandspruit and adjacent to Hoedspruit town.

Hoedspruit Civil runway details: 17 / 35 1 250 x 9m paved. FAHT - S24°21'06.0" E30°56'58.0

== Zandspruit Airshow ==
When the Hoedspruit Airshow (traditionally held at Air Force Base Hoedspruit) was cancelled due to budgetary constraints, the owners and developers of Zandspruit Bush & Aero Estate stepped in and both organised, sponsored and hosted the inaugural Zandspruit Airshow on Saturday 7 September 2013.

Open to the public and with limited support from Air Force Base Hoedspruit, the official Air Show South Africa (ASSA) event was attended by an estimated 4 000 visitors and spectators.

The airshow program featured numerous professional airshow display teams and individuals, skydiving and aerobatic displays, as well as privately owned jets, a number of historic World War II aircraft, and a Huey performing a ‘Working on Fire’ water bombing demonstration.

The dates for the Zandspruit Airshow 2015 have been given as 13 June.

== Awards ==
In October 2012 Zandspruit Bush & Aero Estate received the Silver Award for Best Developer Africa at the Overseas Property Professionals Awards for Excellence held in London.

At the 2013 Aero Club of South Africa Awards the Zandspruit Airshow achieved second place in the African Pilot Airshow of the Year 2013 Award.

At the 2013 Overseas Property Professionals Awards For Excellence held at London's Natural History Museum Zandspruit Bush & Aero Estate received 2 Gold and 2 Bronze awards: Gold - Best Developer Africa; Gold - Best Affordable Developer; Bronze - Best Luxury Developer; Bronze - Best Global Developer.

== Security ==
The security and perimeter fencing is designed so as to not interfere with the natural bush. There is one outer fence around the 1 000ha Estate and 1 inner fence, separating the residential area from the commercial area.

== See also ==
- Eastgate Airport
