= Kosciusko-Attala County Airport =

- IATA: OSX; ICAO: KOSX; FAA LID: OSX

Summary
- Airport type: Public
- Owner: City of Kosciusko and Attala County
- Serves: Kosciusko, Mississippi
- Elevation AMSL: 1,987.2 ft (605.7 m)
- Coordinates: 33°05′24.9″N 089°32′31.3″W
- Interactive map of Kosciusko-Attala County Airport

Runways
Direction	Length		Surface
Direction	ft	m	Surface
14/32	5,009	1,527	Asphalt
- Source: Federal Aviation Administration

Kosciusko-Attala County Airport (IATA: OSX, ICAO: KOSX, FAA LID: OSX) is a public-use airport located in Kosciusko, Mississippi. The airport is owned by the city of Kosciusko and Attala County. The National Plan of Integrated Airport Systems for 2011–2015 categorized it as a general aviation facility.

== Facilities ==
The airport is located at an elevation of 494 ft (151 m). It has one runway: 14/32, which is 5009 x 75 ft. (1527 x 23 m). The airport has no control tower.

In 2025, the airport was awarded a $600,000 grant by the Federal Aviation Administration, which is planned to go towards the construction of a 2500 square foot hangar, as well as for multiple minor reconstructions.

== Accidents and incidents ==
- On March 8, 2015, a two-seater decathlon crashed in southern Attala County shortly after taking off from the Kosciusko Airport. Both occupants of the plane were killed.

== See also ==
- List of airports in Mississippi
