= Tunica Municipal Airport =

- IATA: UTM; ICAO: KUTA; FAA LID: UTA

Summary
- Airport type: Public
- Owner: Tunica County Airport Commission
- Serves: Memphis metropolitan area
- Location: Tunica, Mississippi
- Elevation AMSL: 194 ft / 59 m
- Coordinates: 34°41′06″N 090°20′52″W
- Website: www.TunicaAirport.com

Map
- Location of airport in Mississippi UTA (the United States)

Runways
| Direction | Length | | Surface |
| Direction | ft | m | Surface |
|---|---|---|---|
| 17/35 | 8,500 | 2,591 | Asphalt |

Statistics (2021)
- Aircraft operations (year ending 2/28/2021): 10,943
- Based aircraft: 24
- Sources: FAA and airport website

Tunica Municipal Airport (IATA: UTM, ICAO: KUTA, FAA LID: UTA, formerly M97) is a public use airport located one nautical mile (2 km) east of the central business district of Tunica, in Tunica County, Mississippi, United States. It is owned by the Tunica County Airport Commission. Also known as Tunica Airport, it should not be confused with the 10 acre privately owned, public use Tunica Airport (FAA LID: 30M) located 2 nautical miles (4 km) south of the center of town, which has been renamed to Ralph M Sharpe Airport.

As per Federal Aviation Administration records, the airport had 59,795 passenger boardings (enplanements) in calendar year 2008, 64,238 enplanements in 2009, and 65,907 in 2010. It has not had scheduled commercial airline passenger service since 2011. This airport is included in the National Plan of Integrated Airport Systems for 2011–2015, which categorized it as a general aviation facility.

Although most U.S. airports use the same three-letter location identifier for the FAA and IATA, Tunica Municipal Airport is assigned UTA by the FAA and UTM by the IATA (which assigned UTA to Mutare Airport in Mutare, Zimbabwe).

== History ==
Development and improvement of the facility, located in the southern portion of the Memphis Metropolitan Area, has increased dramatically since the 1990s. Tunica Municipal is one of many beneficiaries of sales tax revenue generated by the addition of casinos to the county, following approval by the Mississippi Legislature to introduce gaming houses. The growth of the Tunica Resorts region into the third largest gaming destination, behind Las Vegas, Nevada and Atlantic City, New Jersey, aided efforts to expand air service beyond charter flights.

The airport opened in 2003 with a 5,500-foot runway. A $5.6 million project in 2004 extended the runway length to 7,000 feet, long enough to accommodate larger aircraft.

In 2005, Tunica received its Part 139 certification to allow large jets from the Federal Aviation Administration. The first large jet, a 125-passenger Boeing 737 operated by Gold Transportation for Harrah's Entertainment, landed in Tunica in November 2005. Prior to this flight, the largest flight that had landed in Tunica had 30 passengers. In May 2006, Boston-Maine Airways operating as Pan Am Clipper Connection, began Tunica's first scheduled service with three Boeing 727 flights per week from Hartsfield–Jackson Atlanta International Airport. That service ended in 2006 when the airline lost its routes from Atlanta.

Casino charters continue to fly into Tunica growing passenger traffic despite the loss of the Clipper Connection service. In 2007, the airport had nearly 50,000 charter passengers. The charter traffic continued to grow with the announcement that Allegiant Airlines, would base under a contract with Harrah's Entertainment, to base two Allegiant aircraft at Tunica to ferry customers to Tunica, New Orleans, St. Louis and Council Bluffs, Iowa. In 2008, total passenger traffic to Tunica was more than 70,000 people.

Tunica completed a $40 million project to extend the runway to 8,500 feet, extend the taxiway and build a new hangar. The airport opened the commercial terminal in 2011. The passenger terminal replaced the temporary terminal building which had been in operation since the airport opened.

AirTran Airways began nonstop flights from Tunica to Atlanta on May 6, 2010, with Boeing 717 aircraft. It was the airport's first regular commercial service since 2006. However, AirTran ended service on May 2, 2011. Vision Airlines launched service to Destin/Fort Walton on June 1, 2011, but dropped the route a few months later leaving the airport with no commercial scheduled service. Republic Airlines opened charter service a few years later from Youngstown, Ohio, a route which was later operated by Elite Airways, which has also ceased all operations.

The Tunica Airport completed construction on a second 20,000 sq. ft. hangar in 2015. The airport added a 10-bay T-hangar to the airfield in 2021.

== Facilities and aircraft ==
Tunica Municipal Airport covers an area of 863 acres (349 ha) at an elevation of 194 feet (59 m) above mean sea level. It has one runway designated 17/35 with an asphalt surface measuring 8,500 by 150 feet (2,591 x 46 m).

For the 12-month period ending February 28, 2021, the airport had 10,943 aircraft operations, an average of 30 per day: 96% general aviation, 2% air taxi, 1% military, and <1% scheduled commercial. At that time there were 24 aircraft based at this airport: 16 single-engine, 6 multi-engine, and 2 jet.

The Tunica Airport consists of a general aviation terminal, commercial terminal, two 20,000 sq. ft. hangars, a 10-bay T-hangar, fire department and training building, car rental facility capabilities, and fixed-base operator (FBO) Tunica Air Center.

== See also ==
- List of airports in Mississippi
