= Trent Lott International Airport =

- IATA: PGL; ICAO: KPQL; FAA LID: PQL

Summary
- Airport type: Public
- Owner: Jackson County
- Serves: Pascagoula, Mississippi
- Elevation AMSL: 17 ft (5.2 m)
- Coordinates: 30°27′46″N 088°31′45″W
- Website: http://www.co.jackson.ms.us/153/Airport
- Interactive map of Trent Lott International Airport

Runways
Direction	Length		Surface
Direction	ft	m	Surface
17/35	6,501	1,982	Asphalt

Statistics (2023)
- Aircraft operations (year ending 5/26/2023): 32,787
- Based aircraft: 32
- Source: Federal Aviation Administration

Trent Lott International Airport (IATA: PGL, ICAO: KPQL, FAA LID: PQL) is a county-owned public-use airport located in Moss Point, approximately six miles (9.7 km) north of the central business district of Pascagoula, a city in Jackson County, Mississippi, United States. The airport is named for Trent Lott, a former United States Senator from Mississippi.

Although many U.S. airports use the same three-letter location identifier for the FAA and IATA, Trent Lott International Airport is assigned PQL by the FAA and PGL by the IATA. PGL was formerly assigned to Jackson County Airport in Pascagoula which closed sometime between 1982 and 1989.

DayJet provided an on-demand jet air taxi service from this airport to Jacksonville, Lakeland, Tallahassee, Pensacola, Gainesville, Boca Raton, Opa-Locka/Miami Dade County, Naples, Sarasota/Bradenton, Savannah, Macon, and Montgomery. This service ended in September 2008.

== Facilities and aircraft ==
Trent Lott International Airport covers an area of 906 acres (367 ha) and has one runway designated 17/35 with an asphalt pavement measuring 6,501 ft × 150 ft (1,982 m × 46 m).

For the 12-month period ending May 26, 2023, the airport had 32,787 aircraft operations, an average of 90 per day: 86% general aviation, 10% air taxi and 4% military. At that time there were 32 aircraft based at this airport: 24 single-engine, 4 multi-engine, 2 jet and 2 helicopter.

== See also ==
- List of airports in Mississippi
