= Monroe County Airport (Mississippi) =

- IATA: none; ICAO: none; FAA LID: M40

Summary
- Airport type: Public
- Owner: Monroe County
- Serves: Aberdeen / Amory, Mississippi
- Location: Monroe County, Mississippi
- Elevation AMSL: 226 ft / 69 m
- Coordinates: 33°52′26″N 088°29′23″W

Map
- Location of airport in Mississippi M40 (the United States)

Runways
Direction	Length		Surface
Direction	ft	m	Surface
18/36	4,999	1,524	Asphalt

Statistics (2011)
- Aircraft operations: 11,865
- Based aircraft: 32
- Source: Federal Aviation Administration

Monroe County Airport (FAA LID: M40) is a county-owned, public-use airport in Monroe County, Mississippi, United States. It is located four nautical miles (5 mi, 7 km) northeast of the central business district of Aberdeen and south of Amory. This airport is included in the National Plan of Integrated Airport Systems for 2011–2015, which categorized it as a general aviation facility.

== Facilities and aircraft ==
Monroe County Airport covers an area of 420 acres (170 ha) at an elevation of 226 feet (69 m) above mean sea level. It has one runway designated 18/36 with an asphalt surface measuring 4,999 by 75 feet (1,524 x 23 m).

For the 12-month period ending November 29, 2011, the airport had 11,865 general aviation aircraft operations, an average of 32 per day. At that time there were 32 aircraft based at this airport: 69% single-engine, 16% glider, 12% multi-engine, and 3% jet.

== See also ==
- List of airports in Mississippi
