= Frontier Airpark =

- IATA: none; ICAO: none; FAA LID: WN53

Summary
- Airport type: Private airpark
- Location: near Marysville, Washington
- Elevation AMSL: 480 ft / 146 m
- Coordinates: 48°06′37.5″N 122°03′46.2″W
- Website: frontierairpark.org
- Interactive map of Frontier Airpark

Runways
Direction	Length		Surface
Direction	m	ft	Surface
16/34	1,158	3,800	Asphalt

Frontier Airpark is a private airport and suburban housing development located east of Marysville, Washington. The airpark was established in 1985 and features a single 3,800-foot-long (1,200 m) runway that is connected to homes by a series of taxiways. The neighborhood has 117 homes with rights to the runway limited to a portion of homeowners. The streets are 50 feet (15 m) wide to allow planes and vehicles to pass.

== See also ==
- List of airports in Washington
