= List of airports in Mississippi =

This is a list of airports in Mississippi (a U.S. state), grouped by type and sorted by location. It contains all public-use and military airports in the state. Some private-use and former airports may be included where notable, such as airports that were previously public-use, those with commercial enplanements recorded by the FAA or airports assigned an IATA airport code.

== Airports ==
This list contains the following information:

- **City served** – The city generally associated with the airport, as per the airport's master record with the Federal Aviation Administration. This is not always the actual location since some airports are located in smaller towns outside of the city they serve. It is not meant to be a complete list of cities served, which can be found in or added to each airport's Wikipedia article.
- **FAA** – The location identifier assigned by the Federal Aviation Administration (FAA).
- **IATA** – The airport code assigned by the International Air Transport Association (IATA). Those that do not match the FAA code are shown in bold.
- **ICAO** – The location indicator assigned by the International Civil Aviation Organization (ICAO).
- **Airport name** – The official airport name. Those shown in **bold** indicate the airport has scheduled passenger service on commercial airlines.
- **Role** – One of four FAA airport categories, as per the 2021–2025 National Plan of Integrated Airport Systems (NPIAS) report released September 2020:
  - P-s: Commercial service – primary are publicly owned airports that receive scheduled passenger service and have more than 10,000 passenger boardings (enplanements) each year. Each primary airport is sub-classified by the FAA as one of the following four "hub" types (s):
    - L: Large hub that accounts for at least 1% of total U.S. passenger enplanements.
    - M: Medium hub that accounts for between 0.25% and 1% of total U.S. passenger enplanements.
    - S: Small hub that accounts for between 0.05% and 0.25% of total U.S. passenger enplanements.
    - N: Nonhub that accounts for less than 0.05% of total U.S. passenger enplanements, but more than 10,000 annual enplanements.
  - CS: Commercial service – nonprimary are publicly owned airports that receive scheduled passenger service and have at least 2,500 passenger boardings each year.
  - R: Reliever airports are designated by the FAA to relieve congestion at a large commercial service airport and to provide more general aviation access to the overall community.
  - GA: General aviation airports are the largest single group of airports in the U.S. airport system. They are public-use airports that do not have scheduled service or have scheduled service with less than 2,500 passenger boardings each year.
- **Enplanements** – The number of enplanements (commercial passenger boardings) that occurred at the airport in calendar year 2024, as per FAA records released October 2025.

City served	FAA	IATA	ICAO	Airport name	Role	Enplanements (2024)
				**Commercial service – primary airports**		
Columbus	GTR	GTR	KGTR	**Golden Triangle Regional Airport**	P-N	47,323
Gulfport / Biloxi	GPT	GPT	KGPT	**Gulfport–Biloxi International Airport**	P-N	424,624
Hattiesburg / Laurel	PIB	PIB	KPIB	**Hattiesburg–Laurel Regional Airport**	P-N	15,575
Jackson	JAN	JAN	KJAN	**Jackson–Medgar Wiley Evers International Airport**	P-S	616,695
Meridian	MEI	MEI	KMEI	**Key Field**	P-N	17,003
Tupelo	TUP	TUP	KTUP	**Tupelo Regional Airport** (C.D. Lemons Field)	P-N	16,194
				**Commercial service – nonprimary airports**		
Greenville	GLH	GLH	KGLH	**Greenville Mid-Delta Airport**	CS	6,582
Natchez	HEZ	HEZ	KHEZ	Natchez–Adams County Airport (Hardy-Anders Field)	CS (begins July 1, 2026)	0
				**Reliever airports**		
Olive Branch	OLV	OLV	KOLV	Olive Branch Airport	R	2
				**General aviation airports**		
Aberdeen / Amory	M40			Monroe County Airport	GA	0
Ackerman	9M4			Ackerman Choctaw County Airport	GA	0
Batesville	PMU		KPMU	Panola County Airport	GA	6
Bay St. Louis	HSA		KHSA	Stennis International Airport	GA	32
Bay Springs	00M			Thigpen Field	GA	0
Belmont	01M			Tishomingo County Airport	GA	0
Belzoni	1M2			Belzoni Municipal Airport	GA	0
Booneville / Baldwyn	8M1			Booneville/Baldwyn Airport	GA	0
Brookhaven	1R7			Brookhaven-Lincoln County Airport	GA	5
Carthage	08M			Carthage–Leake County Airport	GA	0
Charleston	09M			Charleston Municipal Airport	GA	0
Clarksdale	CKM	CKM	KCKM	Fletcher Field	GA	2
Cleveland	RNV		KRNV	Cleveland Municipal Airport	GA	0
Columbia	0R0			Columbia–Marion County Airport	GA	0
Columbus	UBS	UBS	KUBS	Columbus-Lowndes County Airport	GA	0
Corinth	CRX	CRX	KCRX	Roscoe Turner Airport	GA	0
Crosby	C71			Crosby Municipal Airport	GA	0
Crystal Springs	M11			Copiah County Airport	GA	0
Drew	M37			Ruleville-Drew Airport	GA	0
Eupora	06M			Eupora Airport	GA	0
Forest	2M4			G. V. Montgomery Airport	GA	0
Greenwood	GWO	GWO	KGWO	Greenwood–Leflore Airport	GA	9
Grenada	GNF		KGNF	Grenada Municipal Airport	GA	5
Hattiesburg	HBG	HBG	KHBG	Hattiesburg Bobby L. Chain Municipal Airport	GA	8
Hollandale	14M			Hollandale Municipal Airport	GA	0
Holly Springs	M41			Holly Springs-Marshall County Airport	GA	0
Houston	M44			Houston Municipal Airport	GA	0
Indianola	IDL		KIDL	Indianola Municipal Airport	GA	0
Iuka	15M			Iuka Airport	GA	0
Jackson	HKS	HKS	KHKS	Hawkins Field	GA	0
Kosciusko	OSX	OSX	KOSX	Kosciusko-Attala County Airport	GA	0
Laurel	LUL	LUL	KLUL	Hesler-Noble Field	GA	122
Lexington	19M			C. A. Moore Airport	GA	0
Louisville	LMS	LMS	KLMS	Louisville/Winston County Airport	GA	0
Lumberton	4R1			I. H. Bass Jr. Memorial Airport	GA	0
Macon	20M			Macon Municipal Airport	GA	0
Madison	MBO	**DXE**	KMBO	Bruce Campbell Field	GA	64
Magee	17M			Magee Municipal Airport	GA	0
McComb	MCB	MCB	KMCB	McComb–Pike County Airport (John E. Lewis Field)	GA	0
New Albany	M72			New Albany-Union County Airport	GA	0
Newton	M23			James H. Easom Field	GA	0
Okolona	5A4			Okolona Municipal Airport (Richard Stovall Field)	GA	0
Oxford	UOX	UOX	KUOX	University-Oxford Airport	GA	291
Pascagoula	PQL	**PGL**	KPQL	Trent Lott International Airport	GA	12
Philadelphia	MPE		KMPE	Philadelphia Municipal Airport	GA	0
Picayune	MJD		KMJD	Picayune Municipal Airport	GA	0
Pittsboro	04M			Calhoun County Airport	GA	0
Pontotoc	22M			Pontotoc County Airport	GA	0
Poplarville	M13			Poplarville-Pearl River County Airport	GA	0
Prentiss	M43			Prentiss-Jefferson Davis County Airport	GA	0
Quitman	23M			Clarke County Airport	GA	0
Raymond	JVW		KJVW	John Bell Williams Airport	GA	0
Richton	M59			Richton-Perry County Airport	GA	0
Ripley	25M			Ripley Airport	GA	0
Starkville	STF		KSTF	George M. Bryan Airport	GA	7
Tunica	UTA	**UTM**	KUTA	Tunica Municipal Airport	GA	0
Tylertown	T36			Paul Pittman Memorial Airport	GA	0
Vicksburg	VKS	VKS	KVKS	Vicksburg Municipal Airport	GA	1
Water Valley	33M			Water Valley Municipal Airport	GA	0
Waynesboro	2R0			Waynesboro Municipal Airport	GA	1
West Point	M83			McCharen Field	GA	0
Wiggins	M24			Dean Griffin Memorial Airport	GA	0
Winona	5A6			Winona-Montgomery County Airport	GA	0
Yazoo City	87I			Yazoo County Airport	GA	0
				**Other public-use airports** (not listed in NPIAS)		
Diamondhead	66Y			Diamondhead Airport		
Hernando	H75			Hernando Village Airpark		
Marks	MMS	MMS	KMMS	Selfs Airport		
Ocean Springs	5R2			Ocean Springs Airport		
Starkville	M51			Oktibbeha Airport		
Tunica	30M			Ralph M. Sharpe Airport		
				**Other military airports**		
Biloxi	BIX	BIX	KBIX	Keesler Air Force Base		
Camp Shelby	SLJ		KSLJ	Hagler AAF (Camp Shelby)		
Columbus	CBM	CBM	KCBM	Columbus Air Force Base		
Meridian	NMM		KNMM	NAS Meridian (McCain Field)		
Meridian	NJW		KNJW	NOLF Joe Williams		
Shuqualak	1MS8			Columbus AFB Auxiliary Field		
				**Notable private-use airports**		
Flowood	MS90			Flowood Industrial Airport		
Poplarville	MS88			Oreck Airport		
Rolling Fork	04MS			Nick's Flying Service Inc. Airport		
Rolling Fork	5MS1	**RFK**		Rollang Field		
				**Notable former airports**		
Fulton	~~11M~~			Fulton-Itawamba County Airport (closed 2005?)	~~GA~~	
Pascagoula	~~PGL~~			Jackson County Airport ()		

== See also ==
- Essential Air Service
- Mississippi World War II Army Airfields
- Wikipedia:WikiProject Aviation/Airline destination lists: North America § Mississippi
