= Holly Springs-Marshall County Airport =

Airport in Mississippi, US

- IATA: none; ICAO: none; FAA LID: M41

Summary
- Airport type: Public
- Owner: City of Holly Springs
- Serves: Holly Springs, Mississippi
- Elevation AMSL: 551 ft (168 m)
- Coordinates: 34°48′16″N 089°31′16″W

Map
- Location of airport in Mississippi M41 (the United States)

Runways
Direction	Length		Surface
Direction	ft	m	Surface
18/36	3,202	976	Asphalt

Statistics (2012)
- Aircraft operations: 12,680
- Based aircraft: 10
- Source: Federal Aviation Administration

Holly Springs-Marshall County Airport (FAA LID: M41) is a city-owned, public-use airport located four nautical miles (5 mi, 7 km) west of the central business district of Holly Springs, a city in Marshall County, Mississippi, United States. Owned by the City of Holly Springs, it is included in the National Plan of Integrated Airport Systems for 2011–2015, which categorized it as a general aviation facility.

== Facilities and aircraft ==
Holly Springs-Marshall County Airport covers an area of 94 acres (38 ha) at an elevation of 551 feet (168 m) above mean sea level. It has one runway designated 18/36 with an asphalt surface measuring 3,202 by 60 feet (976 x 18 m).

For the 12-month period ending October 3, 2012, the airport had 12,680 aircraft operations, an average of 34 per day: 99% general aviation and 1% military. At that time there were 10 single-engine aircraft based at this airport.

== See also ==
- List of airports in Mississippi
