= Lincoln Regional Airport =

Lincoln Regional Airport may refer to:

- Lincoln Regional Airport (California) in Lincoln, California, United States (FAA: LHM)
- Lincoln Regional Airport (Maine) in Lincoln, Maine, United States (FAA: LRG)

== See also ==
- Lincoln Airport (disambiguation)
- Lincoln County Airport (disambiguation)
- Lincoln Municipal Airport (disambiguation)
