= Louisville/Winston County Airport =

- IATA: LMS; ICAO: KLMS; FAA LID: LMS

Summary
- Airport type: Public
- Owner: City of Louisville and Winston County
- Serves: Louisville, Mississippi
- Elevation AMSL: 574.5 ft / 175 m
- Coordinates: 33°08′45.5″N 089°03′44.8″W
- Website: https://www.cityoflouisvillems.com/airport
- Interactive map of Louisville/Winston County Airport

Runways
Direction	Length		Surface
Direction	ft	m	Surface
14/32	4,669	1,423	Asphalt
- Source: Federal Aviation Administration

Louisville/Winston County Airport (IATA: LMS, ICAO: KLMS, FAA LID: LMS) is a public-use airport located in Louisville, Mississippi. It is owned by the City of Louisville and Winston County. The National Plan of Integrated Airport Systems for 2011–2015 categorized it as a general aviation facility. The airport hosts the annual "Wings Over Winston" public airshow.

== Facilities ==
The airport is located at an elevation of 574 ft (175 m). It has one runway: 17/35, which is 4669 x 75 ft. (1423 x 23 m). The airport has no control tower.

== See also ==
- List of airports in Mississippi
