= Calhoun County Airport (Mississippi) =

Airport in Mississippi, US

- IATA: none; ICAO: none; FAA LID: 04M

Summary
- Airport type: Public
- Owner: Calhoun County
- Serves: Calhoun County, Mississippi
- Location: Pittsboro, Mississippi
- Elevation AMSL: 387 ft (118 m)
- Coordinates: 33°55′48″N 089°20′36″W
- Interactive map of Calhoun County Airport

Runways
Direction	Length		Surface
Direction	ft	m	Surface
15/33	3,200	975	Asphalt

Statistics (2023)
- Aircraft operations (year ending 1/19/2023): 4,498
- Source: Federal Aviation Administration

Calhoun County Airport (FAA LID: 04M) is a county-owned public-use airport in Calhoun County, Mississippi, United States. It is located one nautical mile (1.2 mi; 1.9 km) southwest of the central business district of Pittsboro, Mississippi. The airport is included in the FAA's National Plan of Integrated Airport Systems for 2011–2015, which categorized it as a general aviation facility.

== Facilities and aircraft ==
Calhoun County Airport covers an area of 99 acres (40 ha) at an elevation of 387 feet (118 m) above mean sea level. It has one runway designated 15/33 with an asphalt surface measuring 3,200 by 60 feet (975 by 18 m).

For the 12-month period ending January 19, 2023, the airport had 4,498 general aviation aircraft operations, an average of 86 per week.

== See also ==
- List of airports in Mississippi
