= Yazoo County Airport =

- IATA: none; ICAO: none; FAA LID: 87I

Summary
- Airport type: Public
- Owner: County of Yazoo
- Serves: Yazoo City, Mississippi
- Location: Yazoo County, Mississippi
- Built: November 1989
- Elevation AMSL: 105 ft / 32 m
- Coordinates: 32°53′01″N 090°27′50″W

Map
- Location in Mississippi 87I (the United States)

Runways
Direction	Length		Surface
Direction	ft	m	Surface
17/35	5,001	1,524	Asphalt

Statistics (2022)
- Aircraft operations (year ending 2/24/2022): 8,625
- Based aircraft: 11
- Source: Federal Aviation Administration

Yazoo County Airport (FAA LID: 87I) is five miles northwest of Yazoo City in unincorporated Yazoo County, Mississippi. It is owned by the County of Yazoo.

The National Plan of Integrated Airport Systems for 2011–2015 called it a general aviation facility. In 2010 the airport got a $76,931 Federal Aviation Administration Airport Improvement Program grant for apron lighting.

The airport has a 5,000 feet (1,500 m) lighted runway that was built in 1993 and upgraded in 2000. As of 2001 the airport houses two agricultural businesses and a repair service. Lynne W. Jeter of the Mississippi Business Journal said in 2001 that the county airport "may have played an important role in landing the multi-phase federal prison project that is currently under expansion," referring to the Federal Bureau of Prisons Federal Correctional Complex, Yazoo City.

== Facilities ==
Yazoo County Airport covers 300 acres (121 ha) at an elevation of 105 feet (32 m). Its one runway, 17/35, is 5,001 by 100 feet (1,524 x 30 m) asphalt.

In the year ending March 24, 2022 the airport had 8,625 aircraft operations, average 24 per day: 98% general aviation and 1% military. At that time there were 11 aircraft based at this airport: 8 single-engine, 1 multi-engine, and 2 helicopter.

== See also ==
- List of airports in Mississippi
