= Montgomery County Airport =

Montgomery County Airport may refer to:

- Montgomery County Airport (North Carolina) in Montgomery County, North Carolina, United States
- Montgomery County Airpark in Montgomery County, Maryland, United States
- Mount Sterling-Montgomery County Airport in Montgomery County, Kentucky, United States
- Winona-Montgomery County Airport in Montgomery County, Mississippi, United States

Airports in places named Montgomery County:

- Lone Star Executive Airport in Montgomery County, Texas, United States
