= Lincoln Municipal Airport =

Lincoln Municipal Airport may refer to:

- Lincoln Municipal Airport (Kansas) in Lincoln, Kansas, United States (FAA: K71)
- Lincoln Municipal Airport (Missouri) in Lincoln, Missouri, United States (FAA: 0R2)
- Lincoln Airport (Nebraska), formerly Lincoln Municipal Airport, in Lincoln, Nebraska, United States (FAA: LNK)

== See also ==
- Lincoln Airport (disambiguation)
- Lincoln County Airport (disambiguation)
- Lincoln Regional Airport (disambiguation)
