= C. A. Moore Airport =

Airport in Mississippi, US

- IATA: none; ICAO: none; FAA LID: 19M

Summary
- Airport type: Public
- Owner: City of Lexington
- Serves: Lexington, Mississippi
- Elevation AMSL: 340 ft (100 m)
- Coordinates: 33°07′32″N 090°01′32″W

Map
- Location of airport in Mississippi 19M (the United States)

Runways
| Direction | Length | | Surface |
| Direction | ft | m | Surface |
|---|---|---|---|
| 1/19 | 3,199 | 975 | Asphalt |

Statistics (2023)
- Aircraft operations: 3,300
- Based aircraft: 10
- Source: Federal Aviation Administration

C. A. Moore Airport (FAA LID: 19M) is a public use airport located two nautical miles (4 km) northeast of the central business district of Lexington, a city in Holmes County, Mississippi, United States. Owned by the City of Lexington, it is included in the National Plan of Integrated Airport Systems for 2011–2015, which categorized it as a general aviation facility.

== Facilities and aircraft ==
C. A. Moore Airport covers an area of 90 acres (36 ha) at an elevation of 340 feet (104 m) above mean sea level. It has one runway designated 1/19 with an asphalt surface measuring 3,199 by 60 feet (975 x 18 m).

For the 12-month period ending March 3, 2023, the airport had 3,300 general aviation aircraft operations, an average of 63 per week. At that time there were 10 single-engine aircraft based at this airport.

== See also ==
- List of airports in Mississippi
