= University-Oxford Airport =

Public use airport in Oxford, Mississippi

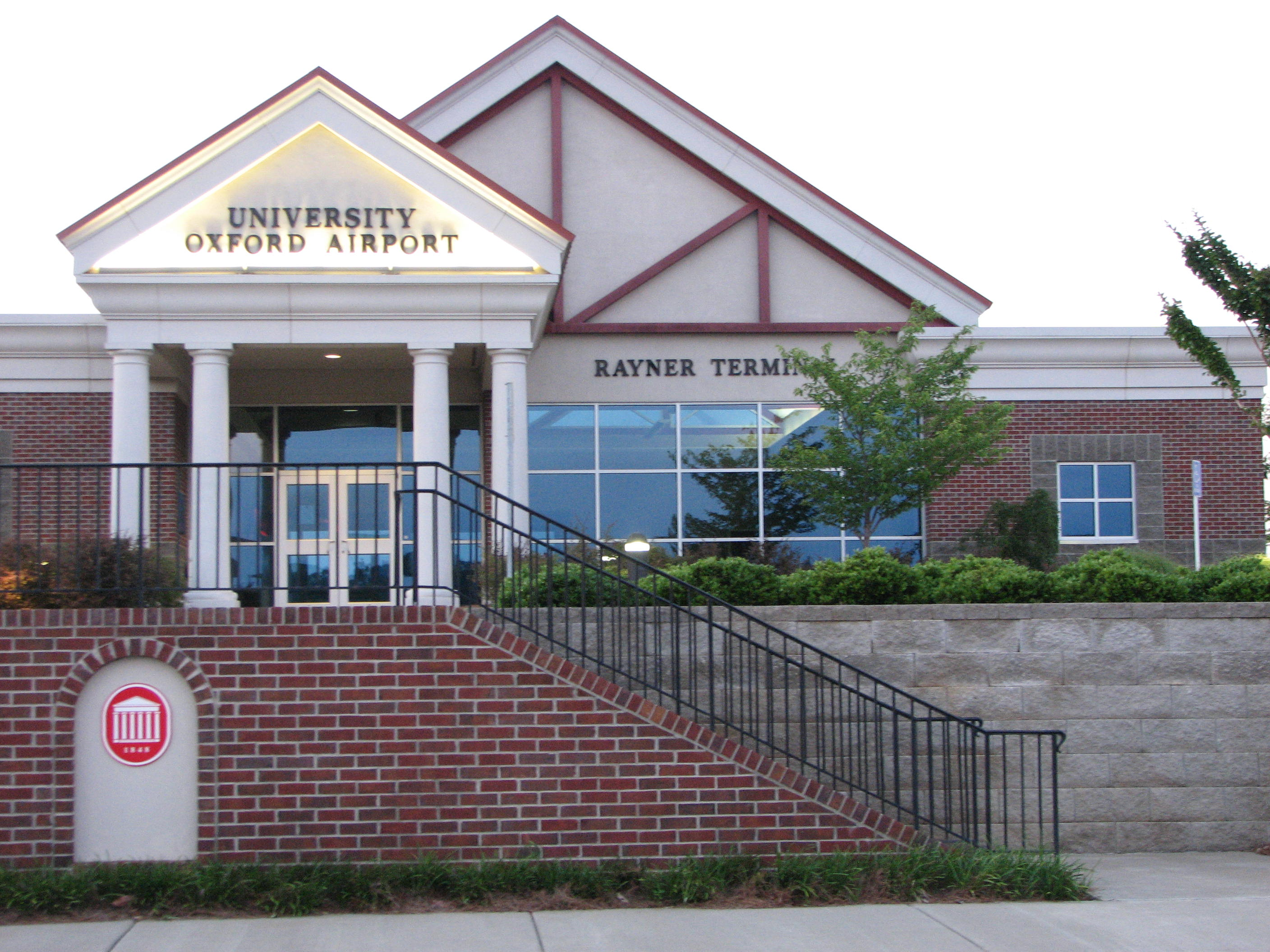
- University-Oxford Airport in 2009
- IATA: UOX; ICAO: KUOX; FAA LID: UOX

Summary
- Airport type: Public
- Owner: University of Mississippi
- Serves: Oxford, Mississippi
- Elevation AMSL: 452 ft / 138 m
- Coordinates: 34°23′04″N 089°32′12″W
- Website: olemiss.edu/airport

Map
- Location of airport in Mississippi UOX (the United States)

Runways
Direction	Length		Surface
Direction	ft	m	Surface
9/27	5,600	1,707	Asphalt

Statistics (2021)
- Aircraft operations (year ending 2/28/2021): 60,253
- Based aircraft: 22
- Source: Federal Aviation Administration

University-Oxford Airport (IATA: UOX, ICAO: KUOX, FAA LID: UOX) is a public use airport located two nautical miles (4 km) northwest of the central business district of Oxford, a city in Lafayette County, Mississippi, United States. The airport is owned by the University of Mississippi. It is included in the National Plan of Integrated Airport Systems for 2011–2015, which categorized it as a general aviation facility.

== Facilities and aircraft ==
University-Oxford Airport covers an area of 297 acres (120 ha) at an elevation of 452 feet (138 m) above mean sea level. It has one runway designated 9/27 with an asphalt surface measuring 5,600 by 100 feet (1,707 x 30 m).

For the 12-month period ending February 28, 2021, the airport had 60,253 aircraft operations, an average of 165 per day: 89% general aviation, 9% air taxi, 3% military, and <1% scheduled commercial. At that time there were 22 aircraft based at this airport: 12 single-engine, 7 multi-engine, and 3 jet.

== Historical air service ==
In 1975, Southern Airways became the first airline to serve Oxford with direct flights to Greenwood and Memphis using Martin 404 piston airliners. There were two flights per day to each destination. Republic Airlines took over both routes using Swearingen Metroliners after they merged with Southern Airways in 1979. Due to an increase in demand, Republic upgraded the service to Convair 580 turboprop airliners in 1981. Republic Airlines left Oxford in 1985. In 1985, Flight Line added direct flights to Greenwood, Jackson, Memphis, and Tupelo using Piper Navajo and Cessna 402 piston aircraft.

More recently, in 2013, Southern Airways Express began flying from Oxford to Destin, Panama City, Jackson, and Gulfport using Cessna 208B turboprop aircraft. The service lasted until 2016 when it was quietly phased out. The airport currently has no airline service.

== Charter operations ==
The airport serves most charter flights for the University of Mississippi. Basketball, Baseball, Volleyball, and Soccer bring many different aircraft. These include Embraer E145 regional jets from United Express, Dornier 328JET aircraft from Ultimate Jet, and the Boeing 737-200 for Ameristar.

== Recent developments ==
In 2017, a new apron was built at the airport in order to accommodate more aircraft during football season. A new fuel depot has been constructed, and the airport has received luggage belt loaders and ground power units.

== See also ==
- List of airports in Mississippi
