= Brookhaven-Lincoln County Airport =

Airport in Mississippi, US

- IATA: none; ICAO: none; FAA LID: 1R7

Summary
- Airport type: Public
- Owner: City of Brookhaven
- Serves: Brookhaven, Mississippi
- Elevation AMSL: 492 ft (150 m)
- Coordinates: 31°36′21″N 090°24′34″W
- Website: Lincoln County Airport

Map
- Location of airport in Mississippi 1R7 (the United States)

Runways
Direction	Length		Surface
Direction	ft	m	Surface
4/22	5,000	1,524	Asphalt

Statistics (2012)
- Aircraft operations: 9,500
- Based aircraft: 26
- Source: Federal Aviation Administration

Brookhaven-Lincoln County Airport (FAA LID: 1R7) is a public use airport located three nautical miles (6 km) northeast of the central business district of Brookhaven, a city in Lincoln County, Mississippi, United States. Owned by the City of Brookhaven, it is included in the National Plan of Integrated Airport Systems for 2011–2015, which categorized it as a general aviation facility. The total cachement population of the two counties is about 46,000 people.

== Facilities and aircraft ==
Brookhaven-Lincoln County Airport covers an area of 146 acres (59 ha) at an elevation of 492 feet (150 m) above mean sea level. It has one runway designated 4/22 with an asphalt surface measuring 5,000 by 75 feet (1,524 x 23 m).

For the 12-month period ending June 12, 2012, the airport had 9,500 general aviation aircraft operations, an average of 26 per day. At that time there were 26 aircraft based at this airport: 62% single-engine, 19% ultralight, 15% multi-engine, and 4% helicopter.

== See also ==
- List of airports in Mississippi
