= Winona-Montgomery County Airport =

- IATA: none; ICAO: none; FAA LID: 5A6

Summary
- Airport type: Public
- Owner: Winona City & Montgomery County
- Serves: Winona, Mississippi
- Elevation AMSL: 364 ft / 111 m
- Coordinates: 33°27′54″N 089°43′49″W

Map
- Location of airport in Mississippi 5A6 (the United States)

Runways
Direction	Length		Surface
Direction	ft	m	Surface
3/21	4,000	1,219	Asphalt

Statistics (2023)
- Aircraft operations (year ending 1/30/2023): 14,328
- Based aircraft: 19
- Source: Federal Aviation Administration

Winona-Montgomery County Airport (FAA LID: 5A6) is a public use airport located one nautical mile (2 km) south of the central business district of Winona, a city in Montgomery County, Mississippi, United States. It is owned by Winona City and Montgomery County. This airport is included in the National Plan of Integrated Airport Systems for 2011–2015, which categorized it as a general aviation facility.

== Facilities and aircraft ==
Winona-Montgomery County Airport covers an area of 50 acres (20 ha) at an elevation of 364 feet (111 m) above mean sea level. It has one runway designated 3/21 with an asphalt surface measuring 4,000 by 60 feet (1,219 x 18 m).

For the 12-month period ending January 30, 2023, the airport had 14,328 aircraft operations, an average of 39 per day: 99% general aviation and <1% military. At that time there were 19 aircraft based at this airport: 18 single-engine and 1 multi-engine.

== See also ==
- List of airports in Mississippi
