= New Albany-Union County Airport =

- IATA: none; ICAO: none; FAA LID: M72

Summary
- Airport type: Public
- Owner: New Albany City & Union County
- Serves: New Albany, Mississippi
- Elevation AMSL: 413 ft / 126 m
- Coordinates: 34°32′56″N 089°01′28″W

Map
- Location of airport in Mississippi M72 (the United States)

Runways
Direction	Length		Surface
Direction	ft	m	Surface
18/36	3,903	1,190	Asphalt

Statistics (2011)
- Aircraft operations: 12,300
- Based aircraft: 20
- Source: Federal Aviation Administration

New Albany-Union County Airport (FAA LID: M72) is a public use airport located three nautical miles (6 km) north of the central business district of New Albany, a city in Union County, Mississippi, United States. It is owned by New Albany City and Union County. This airport is included in the National Plan of Integrated Airport Systems for 2011–2015, which categorized it as a general aviation facility.

== Facilities and aircraft ==
New Albany-Union County Airport covers an area of 100 acres (40 ha) at an elevation of 413 feet (126 m) above mean sea level. It has one runway designated 18/36 with an asphalt surface measuring 3,903 by 75 feet (1,190 x 23 m).

For the 12-month period ending October 10, 2011, the airport had 12,300 aircraft operations, an average of 33 per day: 73% general aviation and 27% military. At that time there were 20 aircraft based at this airport: 80% single-engine, 10% ultralight, 5% multi-engine, and 5% glider.

== See also ==
- List of airports in Mississippi
