= Through the fence operation =

In the United States, the Federal Aviation Administration (FAA) defines residential through-the-fence, or RTTF, as access granted to a federally obligated, public airfield from private, residential property or property zoned for residential use.

These are usually private hangars, often built adjacent to, or as part of a house, allowing aircraft owners immediate access to their aircraft and an airport, without having to drive to the airport. The aircraft does not actually have to pass through a fence to qualify as an RTTF operation. This term is used only because most federally funded airports have a fence enclosing the entire property, that users on adjacent private property will have to pass through.

== See also ==
- Airpark
