= Hernando Village Airpark =

Airport in Mississippi, US

- IATA: none; ICAO: none; FAA LID: H75

Summary
- Airport type: Public use
- Owner: Hernando Village Airpark Inc.
- Serves: Hernando, Mississippi
- Elevation AMSL: 242 ft (74 m)
- Coordinates: 34°47′53″N 090°02′13″W

Map
- Location of airport in Mississippi H75 (the United States)

Runways
Direction	Length		Surface
Direction	ft	m	Surface
14/32	3,340	1,018	Turf

Statistics (2022)
- Aircraft operations (year ending 10/5/2022): 2,970
- Based aircraft: 12
- Source: Federal Aviation Administration

Hernando Village Airpark (FAA LID: H75) is a privately owned, public use airport in DeSoto County, Mississippi, United States. It is located two nautical miles (4 km) southwest of the central business district of Hernando, Mississippi. The airport is part of the Green Village Residential Airpark in Hernando.

== History ==
Hernando Village Airpark opened in 1988 by Diane and Bill Hawks of Mississippi. Their plan was to have a fly-in community, and, along with it, a place where pilots could taxi in along the grass strip runway and park their planes in a hangar on their own property. Two years later, they developed Green Village Residential Airpark by selling lots on 120 acres (0.49 km^{2}) of their land just east of the airport in Hernando. The project encompasses a total of 150 acres (0.61 km^{2}) with the airport and subdivision as of 1998.

== Facilities and aircraft ==
Hernando Village Airpark, Inc Airport covers an area of 40 acres (16 ha) at an elevation of 242 feet (74 m) above mean sea level. It has one runway designated 14/32 with a turf surface measuring 3,340 by 65 feet (1,018 x 20 m).

The Avgas and tie-down spaces are administered by the owner of Hernando Village Airpark.

For the 12-month period ending October 5, 2022, the airport had 2,970 aircraft operations, an average of 57 per week: 98% general aviation and 2% military. At that time there were 12 aircraft based at this airport: 11 single-engine and 1 multi-engine.

== See also ==
- List of airports in Mississippi
