= G. V. Montgomery Airport =

Airport in Mississippi, US

- IATA: none; ICAO: none; FAA LID: 2M4

Summary
- Airport type: Public
- Owner: City of Forest
- Serves: Forest, Mississippi
- Elevation AMSL: 517 ft (158 m)
- Coordinates: 32°21′16″N 089°29′16″W

Map
- Location of airport in Mississippi 2M4 (the United States)

Runways
Direction	Length		Surface
Direction	ft	m	Surface
16/34	3,600	1,097	Asphalt

Statistics (2012)
- Aircraft operations: 5,460
- Based aircraft: 2
- Source: Federal Aviation Administration

G. V. Montgomery Airport (FAA LID: 2M4) is a city-owned, public-use airport located one nautical mile (2 km) south of the central business district of Forest, a city in Scott County, Mississippi, United States. It is included in the National Plan of Integrated Airport Systems for 2011–2015, which categorized it as a general aviation facility.

== Facilities and aircraft ==
G. V. Montgomery Airport covers an area of 87 acres (35 ha) at an elevation of 517 feet (158 m) above mean sea level. It has one runway designated 16/34 with an asphalt surface measuring 3,600 by 75 feet (1,097 x 23 m).

For the 12-month period ending April 5, 2012, the airport had 5,460 general aviation aircraft operations, an average of 14 per day. At that time there were two single-engine aircraft based at this airport.

== See also ==
- List of airports in Mississippi
