= Richton-Perry County Airport =

- IATA: none; ICAO: none; FAA LID: M59

Summary
- Airport type: Public
- Owner: City of Richton
- Serves: Richton, Mississippi
- Elevation AMSL: 167 ft / 51 m
- Coordinates: 31°19′03″N 088°56′06″W

Map
- Location of airport in Mississippi M59 (the United States)

Runways
Direction	Length		Surface
Direction	ft	m	Surface
18/36	3,000	914	Asphalt

Statistics (2023)
- Aircraft operations (year ending 5/3/2023): 1,067
- Based aircraft: 3
- Source: Federal Aviation Administration

Richton-Perry County Airport (FAA LID: M59) is a city-owned, public-use airport located two nautical miles (4 km) south of the central business district of Richton, a city in Perry County, Mississippi, United States. It is included in the National Plan of Integrated Airport Systems for 2011–2015, which categorized it as a general aviation facility.

== Facilities and aircraft ==
Richton-Perry County Airport covers an area of 55 acres (22 ha) at an elevation of 167 feet (51 m) above mean sea level. It has one runway designated 18/36 with an asphalt surface measuring 3,000 by 60 feet (914 x 18 m).

For the 12-month period ending May 3, 2023, the airport had 1,067 general aviation aircraft operations, an average of 20 per week. At that time there were three single-engine aircraft based at this airport.

In March 2015, the runway received $250,000 renovation and resurfacing.

== See also ==
- List of airports in Mississippi
