= Crosby Municipal Airport (Mississippi) =

Airport in Mississippi, US

- IATA: none; ICAO: none; FAA LID: C71

Summary
- Airport type: Public
- Owner: Town of Crosby
- Serves: Crosby, Mississippi
- Elevation AMSL: 336 ft (102 m)
- Coordinates: 31°17′46″N 091°03′10″W
- Website: TownOfCrosby.com/...

Map
- Location of airport in Mississippi C71 (the United States)

Runways
Direction	Length		Surface
Direction	ft	m	Surface
17/35	3,127	953	Asphalt

Statistics (2012)
- Aircraft operations: 1,200
- Source: Federal Aviation Administration

Crosby Municipal Airport (FAA LID: C71) is a public use airport in Amite County, Mississippi, United States. It is owned by the Town of Crosby and located one nautical mile (2 km) northeast of its central business district. This airport is included in the National Plan of Integrated Airport Systems for 2011–2015, which categorized it as a general aviation facility.

== Facilities and aircraft ==
Crosby Municipal Airport covers an area of 40 acres (16 ha) at an elevation of 336 feet (102 m) above mean sea level. It has one runway designated 17/35 with an asphalt surface measuring 3,127 by 60 feet (953 x 18 m).

For the 12-month period ending March 27, 2012, the airport had 1,200 general aviation aircraft operations, an average of 100 per month.

== See also ==
- List of airports in Mississippi
