= Arrastra Creek (Oregon) =

Stream in Oregon, United States

Coordinates: 42°11′02″N 122°46′48″W

Location
- Country: United States
- State: Oregon

Physical characteristics
- Mouth: Wagner Creek

Arrastra Creek is a stream in the U.S. state of Oregon. It is a tributary to Wagner Creek.

Arrastra Creek was named after the arrastra, a piece of mining equipment.
