= Charleston Municipal Airport =

Airport in Mississippi, United States

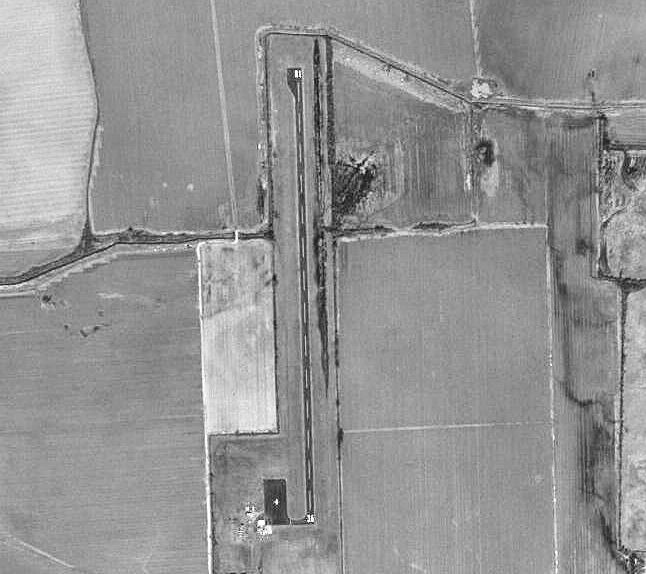
- USGS 1996 orthophoto
- IATA: none; ICAO: none; FAA LID: 09M

Summary
- Airport type: Public
- Owner: City of Charleston
- Serves: Charleston, Mississippi
- Elevation AMSL: 175 ft (53 m)
- Coordinates: 33°59′29″N 090°04′43″W
- Interactive map of Charleston Municipal Airport

Runways
Direction	Length		Surface
Direction	ft	m	Surface
18/36	3,000	914	Asphalt

Statistics (2012)
- Aircraft operations: 5,700
- Source: Federal Aviation Administration

Charleston Municipal Airport (FAA LID: 09M) is a city-owned, public-use airport located two nautical miles (4 km) south of the central business district of Charleston, a city in Tallahatchie County, Mississippi, United States. It is included in the National Plan of Integrated Airport Systems for 2011–2015, which categorized it as a general aviation facility.

== Facilities and aircraft ==
Charleston Municipal Airport covers an area of 47 acres (19 ha) at an elevation of 175 feet (53 m) above mean sea level. It has one runway designated 18/36 with an asphalt surface measuring 3,000 by 50 feet (914 x 15 m). For the 12-month period ending January 4, 2012, the airport had 5,700 general aviation aircraft operations, an average of 15 per day.

== See also ==
- List of airports in Mississippi
