= Keep Cool Creek =

Stream in Montana, United States

Keep Cool Creek Spring Creek
- Etymology: unknown

Location
- Country: United States
- State: Montana
- District: Lewis and Clark County
- Municipality: Lincoln, Montana

Physical characteristics
- Source: unnamed
  - coordinates: 47.03567°N 112.62984°W
- 2nd source: unnamed
  - coordinates: 47.03424°N 112.62516°W
- Mouth: Blackfoot River
  - coordinates: 46.68483°N 111.24934°W
- Length: 12 m (39 ft)

Basin features
- River system: Blackfoot

Keep Cool Creek is a stream in Lewis and Clark County, Montana. The creek offers fishing, and is a major conservation site.

== Watercourse ==
Keep Cool Creek begins north of Lincoln, Montana. The creek continues south with two unnamed streams forming two forks right after its source. After the creeks, the creek continues south, flowing under the Sucker-Keep Cool Creek Road. The creek continues south, passing by Keep Cool Lake and the Keep Cool Lakes. The creek continues south a while longer until an unnamed fork where it sharply turns west. The creek continues west, flowing under Sucker Creek Road and joining two unnamed creeks, Sucker Creek, Liverpool Creek and Stonewall Creek. Once it reaches Liver Pool Creek, Keep Cool Creek turns southeast. The creek continues southwest, flowing under Main Street and joining Beaver Creek. Afterwards, the creek continues flowing southwest until its mouth, the Blackfoot River.

== Species ==
Keep Cool Creek contains four species of fish, with three being native to the state. They are the brown trout, bull trout, mountain whitefish and Westslope cutthroat trout.

== Conservation ==
Recently, the Clark Fork Coalition acquired water rights for 5 cfsg to help Keep Cool Creek connected to the Blackfoot River year-round. Additionally, other various organizations make sure that local mines do not cause damage to the creek.

== Recreation ==
In addition to fishing, Keep Cool Creek also offers general water activities such as wading, kayaking and paddleboarding.

== In popular culture ==
Jeremiah Johnson Brewing Company has an American Blonde Ale named after the creek.
