= Perry County Municipal Airport =

- IATA: none; ICAO: KTEL; FAA LID: TEL

Summary
- Airport type: Public
- Owner: Perry County Airport Authority
- Serves: Tell City, Indiana
- Elevation AMSL: 659 ft / 201 m
- Coordinates: 38°01′04″N 086°41′27″W

Map
- Location of airport in Indiana TEL (the United States)

Runways
Direction	Length		Surface
Direction	ft	m	Surface
13/31	4,400	1,341	Asphalt

Statistics (2006)
- Aircraft operations: 3,048
- Source: Federal Aviation Administration

Perry County Municipal Airport (ICAO: KTEL, FAA LID: TEL) is seven miles northeast of Tell City, in Perry County, Indiana. It is owned by the Perry County Airport Authority.

Most U.S. airports use the same three-letter location identifier for the FAA and IATA, but this airport is TEL to the FAA and has no IATA code.

== Facilities ==
The airport covers 76 acres (31 ha) at an elevation of 659 feet (201 m). It is untowered, and has one runway, 13/31, that is 4,400 x 75 ft (1,341 x 23 m) asphalt. In the 12-month period ending in December 2019, 14 aircraft were based out of the field, all being single-engine light aircraft. Aircraft operations averaged 62 per week, with 65% local general aviation, 27% transient general aviation, 7% military and <1% air taxi, totaling 3,232 operations.

== See also ==
- List of airports in Indiana
