= Lincoln Airport (Montana) =

Airport in Montana, US

- IATA: none; ICAO: none; FAA LID: S69

Summary
- Airport type: Public
- Owner: Montana Aeronautics Division
- Serves: Lincoln, Montana
- Elevation AMSL: 4,603 ft / 1,403 m
- Coordinates: 46°57′17″N 112°39′01″W

Map
- Location of airport in Montana

Runways
Direction	Length		Surface
Direction	ft	m	Surface
4/22	4,239	1,292	Asphalt

Statistics (2010)
- Aircraft operations: 4,115
- Based aircraft: 9
- Source: Federal Aviation Administration

Lincoln Airport (FAA LID: S69) is a public use airport located two nautical miles (4 km) east of the central business district of Lincoln, in Lewis and Clark County, Montana, United States. It is owned by the Montana Aeronautics Division. This airport is included in the National Plan of Integrated Airport Systems for 2011–2015, which categorized it as a general aviation facility.

== Facilities and aircraft ==
Lincoln Airport covers an area of 110 acres (45 ha) at an elevation of 4,603 feet (1,403 m) above mean sea level. It has one runway designated 4/22 with an asphalt surface measuring 4,239 by 75 feet (1,292 x 23 m).

For the 12-month period ending September 24, 2010, the airport had 4,115 aircraft operations, an average of 11 per day: 80% general aviation, 17% air taxi, and 3% military. At that time there were nine single-engine aircraft based at this airport.

== See also ==
- List of airports in Montana
