= Lincoln, Montana =

- Census-designated place
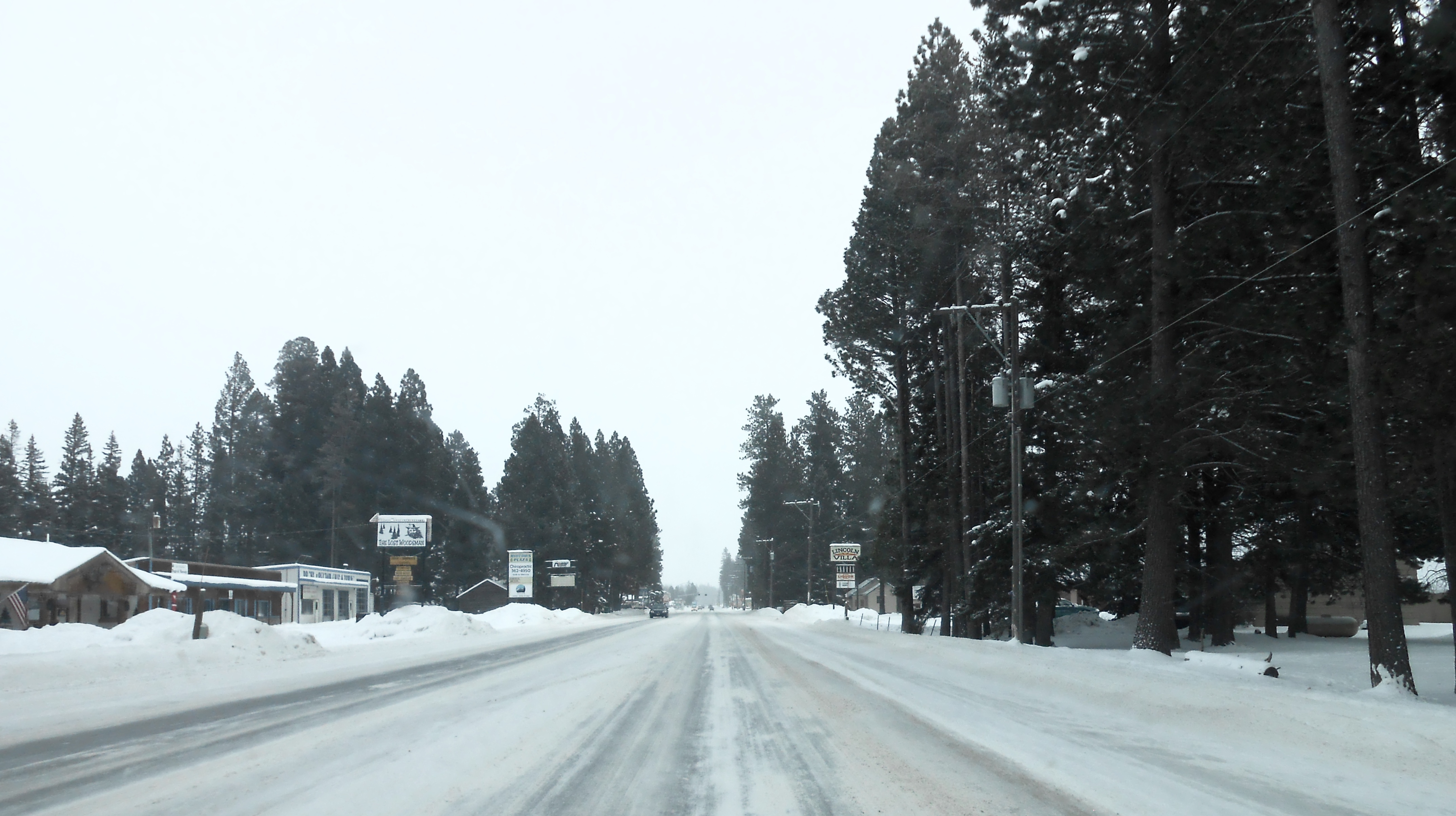
- Downtown Lincoln in the winter

- Location in Montana Location in the United States
- Coordinates: 46°57′20″N 112°40′22″W
- Country: United States
- State: Montana
- County: Lewis and Clark

Area
  - Total: 18.07 sq mi (46.79 km^{2})
  - Land: 17.54 sq mi (45.44 km^{2})
  - Water: 0.52 sq mi (1.34 km^{2})
- Elevation: 4,557 ft (1,389 m)

Population (2020)
  - Total: 998
  - Density: 56.9/sq mi (21.96/km^{2})
- Time zone: UTC−7 (Mountain (MST))
  - Summer (DST): UTC−6 (MDT)
- ZIP Code: 59639
- Area code: 406
- FIPS code: 30-43675
- GNIS feature ID: 2408610

Lincoln is an unincorporated community and census-designated place (CDP) in Lewis and Clark County, Montana, United States. As of the 2020 census, Lincoln had a population of 998.

== History ==
Meriwether Lewis passed through the area on his return to St. Louis in 1806, following the famous "River of the Road to the Buffalo" created by Native Americans centuries before. Gold discoveries in the mid-1860s brought miners to a number of camps in the area, and Lincoln was eventually created when nearby Lincoln Gulch was abandoned in favor of the town's present location. Recreational, logging and mining activities along the Blackfoot River in the early 20th century made it a convenient commercial center. Nearby wilderness areas continue to attract visitors and residents.

In 1865, David Culp and Thomas Patterson staked a claim in what they designated Abe Lincoln Gulch in honor of the recently assassinated president. Word broke out, gold-seekers descended upon the area, and a small community soon formed at the mouth of the gulch with the abbreviated name – Lincoln.

After several starts and stops, a continuously operating post office was finally established in 1887.

The Lincoln Community Hall (1918) and the Hotel Lincoln (1914) are listed on the National Register of Historical Places.

=== "Unabomber" arrest ===
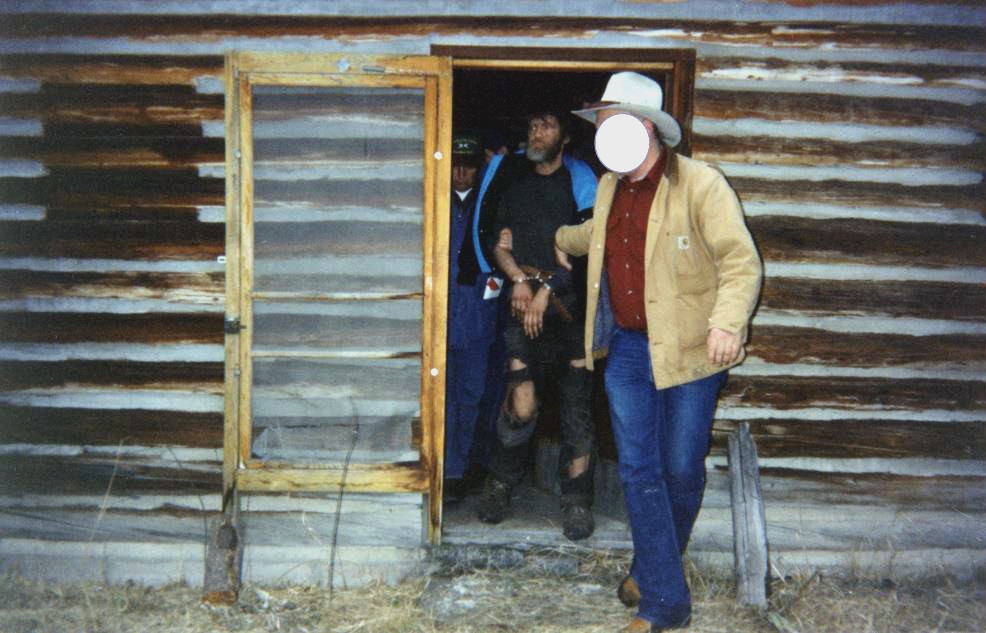
Unabomber Ted Kaczynski is escorted out of a cabin raided by the FBI during their investigation on April 3, 1996

On April 3, 1996, federal officers arrested Ted Kaczynski at his remote cabin 5 miles (8 km) south of Lincoln on Stemple Pass Road, under suspicion of being the "Unabomber", a domestic terrorist who placed pressure-sensitive bombs inside mailed packages. The bombing campaign resulted in three deaths and 23 wounded. Kaczynski was sentenced to eight life sentences without the possibility of parole.

=== 2017 earthquake ===
At 12:30 a.m. on July 6, 2017, there was a 5.8-magnitude earthquake about 6 miles (10 km) south of Lincoln. The earthquake originated from a depth of nearly 3 miles (5 km) underground, near a fault system known as the Lewis and Clark line, which runs 250 miles (400 km) from northern Idaho to east of Helena, Montana. It was the eighth-strongest earthquake recorded in Montana. There were at least nine more tremors nearby within the first hour after the earthquake, with magnitudes between 3.1 and 4.9.

== Geography and climate ==
Lincoln is located in western Lewis and Clark County. The CDP contains the unincorporated center of Lincoln and extends 6 miles (10 km) east up the Blackfoot River valley and 3 miles (5 km) west, or down valley. Its elevation is 4,536 feet (1,383 m) above sea level. According to the United States Census Bureau, the CDP has a total area of 18.1 square miles (46.8 km^{2}), of which 17.5 square miles (45.4 km^{2}) are land and 0.50 square miles (1.3 km^{2}), or 2.87%, are water.

Lincoln is located on Montana Highway 200, the longest route signed as a state highway in the United States, running 706.6 miles (1,137.2 km) from Idaho to North Dakota. From Lincoln, the highway runs northeast up and over the Continental Divide 87 miles (140 km) to Great Falls and west 77 miles (124 km) to Missoula.

Lincoln has a humid continental climate (Dfb) bordering closely on a subarctic climate (Dfc). Summers are warm to hot while winters are cold and snowy, with annual average snowfall totaling 85.4 inches (217 cm).

Rogers Pass, 18 miles (29 km) northeast of Lincoln on Highway 200, is known for being the location of the coldest recorded temperature in the United States outside of Alaska. On January 20, 1954, a temperature of −70 °F (−57 °C) was recorded. Lincoln has a humid continental climate bordering on semi-arid. Snow is usually dry powder, although strong Pacific Ocean storms sometimes bring moisture-laden snow to the area. Some sources list Lincoln as having November's record low of −53 °F (−47 °C), but that never happened, Lincoln's real November record low is −45 °F (−43 °C) .

Climate data for Lincoln, Montana, 1991–2020 normals, extremes 1948–2012
Month	Jan	Feb	Mar	Apr	May	Jun	Jul	Aug	Sep	Oct	Nov	Dec	Year
Record high °F (°C)	59 (15)	60 (16)	72 (22)	84 (29)	92 (33)	94 (34)	102 (39)	102 (39)	98 (37)	84 (29)	68 (20)	55 (13)	102 (39)
Mean maximum °F (°C)	47.1 (8.4)	50.3 (10.2)	60.1 (15.6)	72.6 (22.6)	81.0 (27.2)	87.1 (30.6)	93.3 (34.1)	92.5 (33.6)	86.1 (30.1)	73.7 (23.2)	56.6 (13.7)	44.9 (7.2)	94.9 (34.9)
Mean daily maximum °F (°C)	31.7 (−0.2)	34.7 (1.5)	43.9 (6.6)	52.6 (11.4)	62.5 (16.9)	71.1 (21.7)	81.3 (27.4)	81.1 (27.3)	70.2 (21.2)	54.4 (12.4)	38.9 (3.8)	30.5 (−0.8)	54.4 (12.4)
Daily mean °F (°C)	22.0 (−5.6)	25.1 (−3.8)	32.8 (0.4)	39.7 (4.3)	47.9 (8.8)	55.6 (13.1)	62.6 (17.0)	61.4 (16.3)	52.8 (11.6)	41.5 (5.3)	29.5 (−1.4)	21.6 (−5.8)	41.0 (5.0)
Mean daily minimum °F (°C)	12.3 (−10.9)	15.4 (−9.2)	21.7 (−5.7)	26.8 (−2.9)	33.2 (0.7)	40.1 (4.5)	43.8 (6.6)	41.6 (5.3)	35.4 (1.9)	28.5 (−1.9)	20.0 (−6.7)	12.8 (−10.7)	27.6 (−2.4)
Mean minimum °F (°C)	−17.4 (−27.4)	−14.6 (−25.9)	−1.7 (−18.7)	13.6 (−10.2)	21.6 (−5.8)	28.9 (−1.7)	33.4 (0.8)	29.7 (−1.3)	21.2 (−6.0)	9.1 (−12.7)	−3.5 (−19.7)	−16.0 (−26.7)	−28.3 (−33.5)
Record low °F (°C)	−48 (−44)	−44 (−42)	−34 (−37)	−8 (−22)	8 (−13)	19 (−7)	24 (−4)	21 (−6)	6 (−14)	−13 (−25)	−45 (−43)	−48 (−44)	−48 (−44)
Average precipitation inches (mm)	1.49 (38)	2.30 (58)	1.25 (32)	1.46 (37)	1.99 (51)	2.62 (67)	0.82 (21)	1.04 (26)	1.33 (34)	1.63 (41)	1.35 (34)	1.49 (38)	18.77 (477)
Average snowfall inches (cm)	15.1 (38)	10.0 (25)	7.4 (19)	3.2 (8.1)	1.1 (2.8)	1.2 (3.0)	0.0 (0.0)	0.0 (0.0)	0.5 (1.3)	2.1 (5.3)	9.5 (24)	16.5 (42)	66.6 (168.5)
Average extreme snow depth inches (cm)	12.4 (31)	12.1 (31)	10.1 (26)	4.3 (11)	0.9 (2.3)	0.4 (1.0)	0.0 (0.0)	0.0 (0.0)	0.2 (0.51)	1.2 (3.0)	4.5 (11)	9.6 (24)	17.0 (43)
Average precipitation days (≥ 0.01 in)	9.0	8.3	9.3	8.8	11.0	12.3	7.4	6.6	6.9	8.5	8.6	8.1	104.8
Average snowy days (≥ 0.1 in)	6.1	5.0	4.4	1.5	0.4	0.2	0.0	0.0	0.1	1.0	4.7	6.7	30.1
Source 1: NOAA
Source 2: National Weather Service (mean maxima/minima, snow/snow days/snow depth 1981–2010)

== Demographics ==
Historical population
Census	Pop.	Note	%±
2000	1,100		—
2010	1,013		−7.9%
2020	998		−1.5%
U.S. Decennial Census

As of the census of 2010, there were 1,013 people, 507 households, and 296 families residing in the CDP. The population density was 56.6 inhabitants per square mile (21.9/km^{2}). There were 846 housing units at an average density of 47.3 per square mile (18.3/km^{2}). The racial makeup of the CDP was 95.5% White, 2.2% Native American, 0.2% Asian, and 1.9% from two or more races. Hispanic or Latino of any race were 1.5% of the population.

There were 507 households, out of which 16.6% had children under the age of 18 living with them, 48.3% were married couples living together, 6.7% had a female householder with no husband present, and 41.6% were non-families. 18.5% of all households were made up of individuals, and 33.9% had someone living alone who was 65 years of age or older. The average household size was 2.00 and the average family size was 2.55.

In the CDP, the population was spread out, with 16.3% under the age of 18, 3.7% from 18 to 24, 16.1% from 25 to 44, 41.2% from 45 to 64, and 22.8% who were 65 years of age or older. The median age was 53 years. For every 100 females, there were 108.4 males. For every 100 females age 18 and over, there were 107.3 males.

The median income for a household in the CDP was $26,688, and the median income for a family was $32,784. Males had a median income of $24,583 versus $15,227 for females. The per capita income for the CDP was $14,243. About 17.4% of families and 21.2% of the population were below the poverty line, including 28.8% of those under age 18 and 9.8% of those age 65 or over.

== Infrastructure ==
Lincoln Airport is a public use airport located two miles (4 km) east of town.

== Education ==
Public education in Lincoln is administered by Lincoln Public School District #38, a unified PK-12 school district The district educates students from kindergarten to 12th grade. Lincoln High School's team name is the Lynx.

Lincoln has a public library, a branch of the Lewis & Clark Library.

== Media ==
The Blackfoot Valley Dispatch was a community newspaper published in Lincoln for 44 years until ceasing in 2025. The town receives radio stations from the wider Helena area.

== Notable people ==
- Ted Kaczynski, aka "Unabomber"
- Doug Swingley, four-time winner of the Iditarod Trail Sled Dog Race

== See also ==
- List of census-designated places in Montana
