= Ann Godoff =

American editor and publisher (1949–2026)

- Born: Ann Leslie Godoff; July 22, 1949; New York City, U.S.
- Died: February 24, 2026 (aged 76); Albany, New York, U.S.
- Education: Bennington College; New York University (BFA)
- Occupations: Editor; publisher
- Spouses: Malcolm Drummond (m. 1973; div. 1994) Annik LaFarge (m. 2012)

Ann Leslie Godoff (July 22, 1949 – February 24, 2026) was an American editor and publisher. She was the president of Random House and the founder of Penguin Press.

== Early life and education ==
Godoff was born in New York City on July 22, 1949, and moved with her family to Los Angeles in 1957. She attended Beverly Hills High School and was classmates with Rob Reiner and Richard Dreyfuss. Godoff studied at Bennington College in Vermont, then New York University where she earned a Bachelor of Fine Arts degree in film in 1972.

== Career ==
In 1980, she worked part-time at Simon & Schuster before moving to Atlantic Monthly Press in 1987. In 1991, Godoff started working at Random House where she developed a specialty in more subtle literary works. Her first mass-market hit was In 1994 with The Alienist, written by Caleb Carr. That same year, Godoff edited two other best-selling books, Midnight in the Garden of Good and Evil by John Berendt and Makes Me Wanna Holler by Nathan McCall. In 1995, she edited The Haunted Land by Tina Rosenberg, which won a Pulitzer Prize and National Book Award. Godoff became editor-in-chief of Random House in 1997 and transformed the company's identity, turning long-shot books into runaway hits.

In 2003, Godoff founded Penguin Press where she served as editor-in-chief and publisher. Godoff was known for cultivating talent taking chances on projects she believed in, including The Age of Turbulence by Alan Greenspan, former Federal Reserve Board chairman. Published in 2007, the book became a New York Times hardcover nonfiction best seller. Godoff edited authors including Ron Chernow, Zadie Smith, Salman Rushdie and Thomas Pynchon. She approached editing and publishing with marketing savvy, for example, launching John McCain's memoir right before his presidential run. Across her career, Michael Pollan remained one of her most loyal authors. Godoff edited all of his ten books, including A World Appears, which was published in 2026.

Penguin Press has published five Pulitzer Prize winners, solidifying the impact of the press on both the literary world and on culture as a whole.

== Personal life and death ==
Journalists often referenced how private Godoff was, preferring to promote her authors than herself.

Godoff was briefly married to Malcolm Drummond in 1973. In the 1990s, she began a life partnership with editor and author Annik LaFarge; they were legally married in 2012.

Godoff died of complications from appendix cancer at a hospital in Albany, New York, on February 24, 2026, at the age of 76. Her impact on American book culture was described by President of Penguin Press Scott Moyers as "incalculable".
