= Food Rules =

Food Rules may refer to:

- Food Rules! The Stuff You Munch, Its Crunch, Its Punch, and Why You Sometimes Lose Your Lunch, a 2001 book by Bill Haduch
- Food Rules: An Eater's Manual, a 2009 book by Michael Pollan
