= Them =

Them is a third-person plural or singular accusative personal pronoun.

Them or THEM may also refer to:

== Literature media ==
=== Books ===
- Them (novel), 3rd volume (1969) in American Joyce Carol Oates' Wonderland Quartet
- Them: Adventures with Extremists, 2003 non-fiction by Welsh journalist Jon Ronson
- Them: A Novel, 2007 debut by American Nathan McCall

=== Comics ===
- Them, American Marvel comic book characters, see Advanced Idea Mechanics

=== Magazines ===
- Them (magazine), American online LGBTQ magazine operated by Condé Nast

== Film and television ==
- Them!, a 1954 American science fiction film about giant ants
- Them (2006 film), a 2006 French and Romanian horror film starring Olivia Bonamy and Michael Cohen
- Them (TV series), a 2021 American television series on Amazon Prime Video
- "Them" (The Walking Dead), a 2015 episode of the AMC television series The Walking Dead

== Music ==
- Them (band), Northern Irish rock band featuring Van Morrison
  - The Angry Young Them, their 1965 debut album, released in US as Them
- Them (King Diamond album), 1988
- Themselves, band formerly known as Them
  - Them (Themselves album), 2000
- "Them", song by Carly Simon from her 1980 album Come Upstairs
- "Them", song by The Cranberries released as bonus track on 2002 edition of their 1993 album Everybody Else Is Doing It, So Why Can't We?
- "Them", song by The Haunted from their 2011 album Unseen
- "Them", song by The Acacia Strain from their 2019 album It Comes in Waves

== Other uses ==
- Them, Denmark, town in Silkeborg municipality

== See also ==
- Us and Them (disambiguation)
