= What's Going On =

What's Going On most commonly refers to:

- What's Going On (album), a 1971 album by Marvin Gaye
  - "What's Going On" (song), its 1971 title track (covered by Cyndi Lauper and others)
- "What’s Up?" (4 Non Blondes song), a 1993 song by 4 Non Blondes, with "What’s going on?" in its refrain

What's Going On may also refer to:

== Albums ==
- What's Going On (Johnny "Hammond" Smith album), 1971
- What's Going On (Dirty Dozen Brass Band album), 2006
- What's Goin' On (Frank Strozier album), 1977
- What's Goin' On Ai, a 2006 album by Ai
- What's Goin' On, a single album by Omega X

== Songs ==
- "What's Going On" (Taste song), a 1970 song written by Rory Gallagher
- "What's Going On" (Casey Donovan song), a 2005 single by Casey Donovan
- "What's Going On", a 1960 song by Frankie Ford, B-side to "Chinatown"
- "What's Going On", a song by Canibus from Can-I-Bus
- "What's Going On", a song by Hüsker Dü from Zen Arcade
- "What's Going On", a song by Jesus Jones from Liquidizer
- "What's Going On?", a 1975 song by Al Stewart from Modern Times
- "What’s Going On", a 1984 song by Adam Ant featured in Giorgio Moroder’s restoration of the film Metropolis
- "What's Going On", a song by Todrick Hall from Forbidden
- "What's Goin' On", a 2010 song by Gorilla Zoe
- "What's Really Going On (Strange Fruit)", a song by D'wayne Wiggins
- "Why (What's Goin On?)", a song by The Roots from their 2004 album The Tipping Point

== Other uses ==
- What's Going On (TV series), an American game show
- What's Going On?, a 2008 tour by British comedian Mark Steel
- What's Going On (book), a 1997 book collection by Nathan McCall

== See also ==
- "What's Goin' On Here", a 1974 song by Deep Purple
