= Polyface Farm =

Farm in Swoope, Virginia

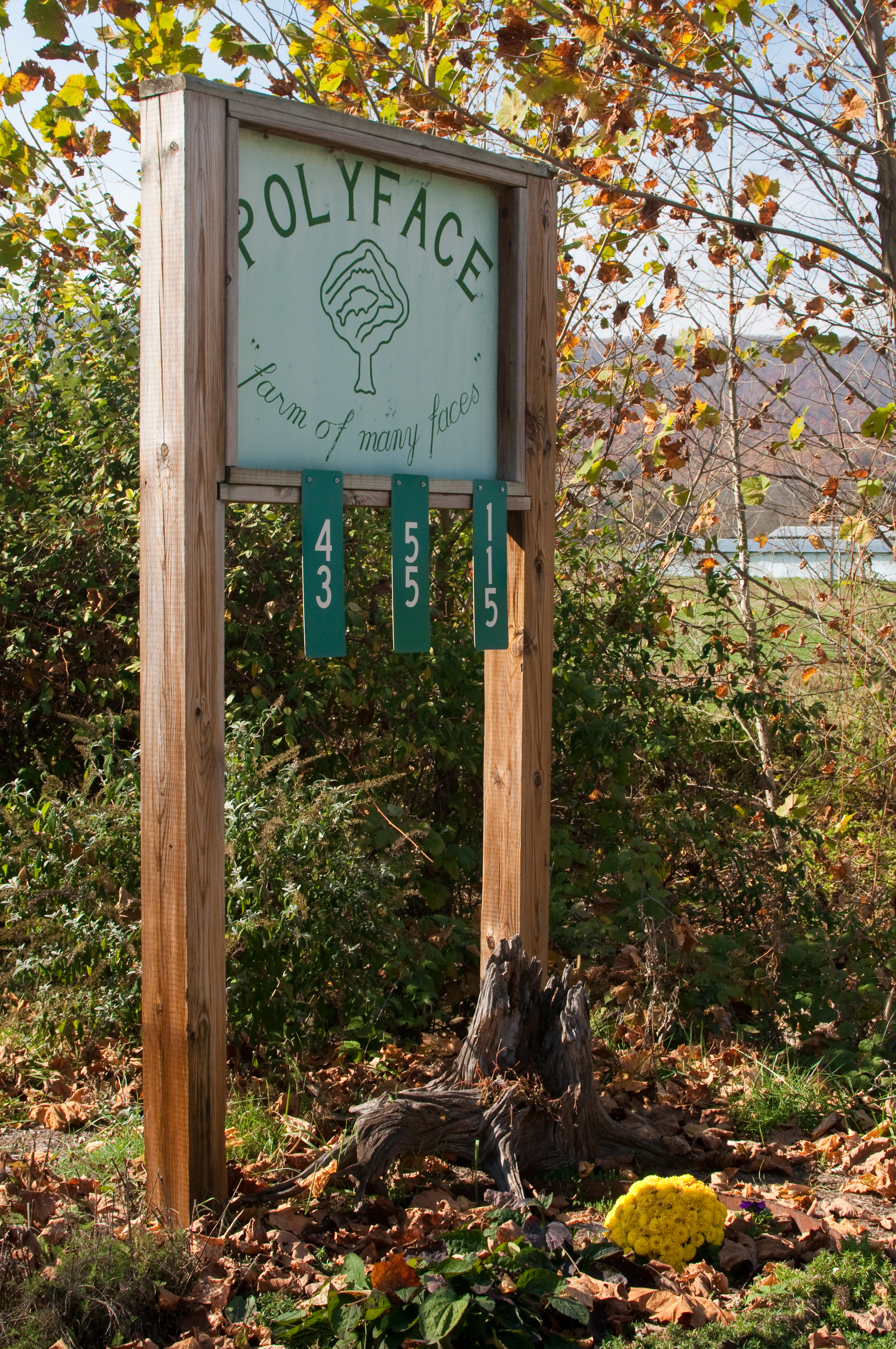
- Town/City: Swoope, Virginia
- Country: United States
- Coordinates: 38.1230°N 79.2230°W
- Established: 1961
- Owner: Joel Salatin
- Area: 500-acre (2.0 km^{2})

Polyface Farm is a farm located in rural Swoope, Virginia, run by Joel Salatin and his family. The farm is driven using unconventional methods with the goal of "emotionally, economically and environmentally enhancing agriculture". This farm is where Salatin developed and put into practice many of his most significant agricultural methods. These include direct marketing of meats and produce to consumers, pastured-poultry, grass-fed beef and the rotation method which makes his farm more like an ecological system than conventional farming. Polyface Farm operates a farm store on-site where consumers go to pick up their products.

== Practices and background ==
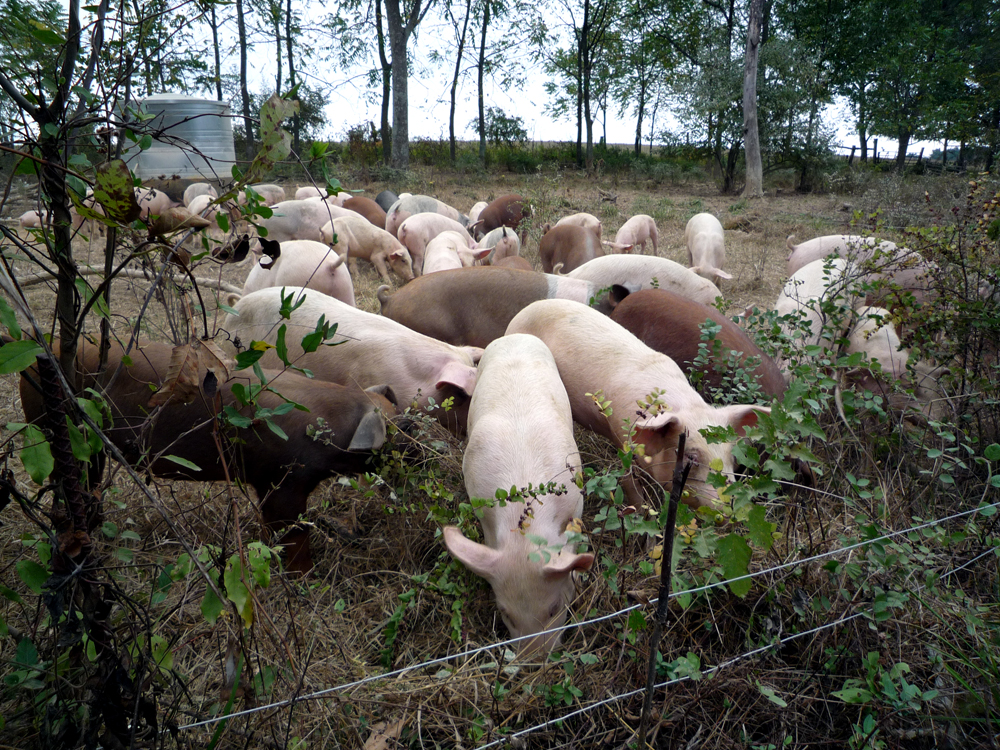
Free range pigs at Polyface Farm

Salatin encourages people to buy locally to save small businesses. Salatin believes it is advantageous for consumers to know their farmers and where their food comes from.

Salatin says that his Christian faith informs how he raises and slaughters the animals on his 500-acre (2.0 km^{2}) farm. He sees it as his responsibility to honour the animals as creatures that reflect God's love and believes his method is to honour that of God. Salatin is quoted in the book The Omnivore's Dilemma as justifying the killing of animals for meat because "people have a soul, animals don't...When they die, they die."

Salatin bases his farm's ecosystem on the principle of observing animals' activities in nature and emulating those conditions as closely as possible. Salatin grazes his cattle outdoors within small pastures enclosed by electrified fencing that is easily moved each evening in an established rotational grazing system. Animal manure fertilizes the pastures and enables Polyface Farm to graze about four times as many cattle as on a conventional farm, thus also saving feed costs. The small size of the pastures forces the cattle to "mob stock", or to eat all the grass.

Polyface raises cattle, pastured meat chickens, egg layers, pigs, turkeys, and rabbits. The diversity in production better utilizes the grass, breaks pathogen cycles, and creates multiple income streams. The meat chickens are housed in portable field shelters that are moved daily to a fresh "salad bar" of new grass and away from yesterday's droppings. All manure is distributed by the chickens directly onto the field. His egg-laying chickens are housed in mobile trailer-style coops (called "eggmobiles") that follow four days after the cattle when flies in the manure are pupating; the chickens get 15% of their feed from this. While scratching for pupae, the chickens also distribute the cow manure across the field.

Salatin feels that "if you smell manure [on a livestock farm], you are smelling mismanagement." So everything possible is done to allow grass to absorb all the fertilizer left behind by the animals. If animals must be kept inside (to brood young chicks for example), Salatin recommends providing deep bedding of wood chips or sawdust to lock in all the nutrients and smell until they can be spread on the field where the compost can be used by the grass.

Salatin's pastures, barn, and farmhouse are located on land below a nearby pond that "feeds the farm" by using 15 miles (24 km) of piping. Salatin also harvests 450 acres (1.8 km^{2}) of woodlands and uses the lumber to construct farm buildings. One of Salatin's principles is that "plants and animals should be provided a habitat that allows them to express their physiological distinctiveness. Respecting and honouring the pigness of the pig is a foundation for societal health."

While Salatin does not sell to supermarkets, Polyface products are available at restaurants (including Chipotle and Staunton's Zynodoa) and local food sellers within a half-days drive of the farm.. Polyface also piloted a shipping program in 2020, and ships all over the United States.

== Media ==
Polyface Farm was featured in the book The Omnivore's Dilemma by Michael Pollan as exemplary sustainable agriculture, contrasting Polyface Farm favorably to factory farming. An excerpt of the book was published in the May/June 2006 issue of Mother Jones. Pollan's book describes Polyface Farm's method of sustainable agriculture as being built on the efficiencies that come from mimicking relationships found in nature and layering one farm enterprise over another on the same base of land. In effect, Joel is farming in time as well as in space—in four dimensions rather than three. He calls this intricate layering "stacking" and points out that "it is exactly the model God used in building nature." "The idea is not to slavishly imitate nature, but to model a natural ecosystem in all its diversity and interdependence, one where all the species "fully express their physiological distinctiveness."

The farm is covered in the August/September 2008 issue of Mother Earth News.

The farm is also featured in the documentary films Food, Inc. and Fresh as well as in episode 3 of the BBC documentary series Jimmy's Global Harvest.

Polyface Farm is a participant in Humane Farm Animal Care's Certified Humane Raised and Handled program.

Salatin and his farm was the main topic of the documentary Polyfaces.

== Criticism ==
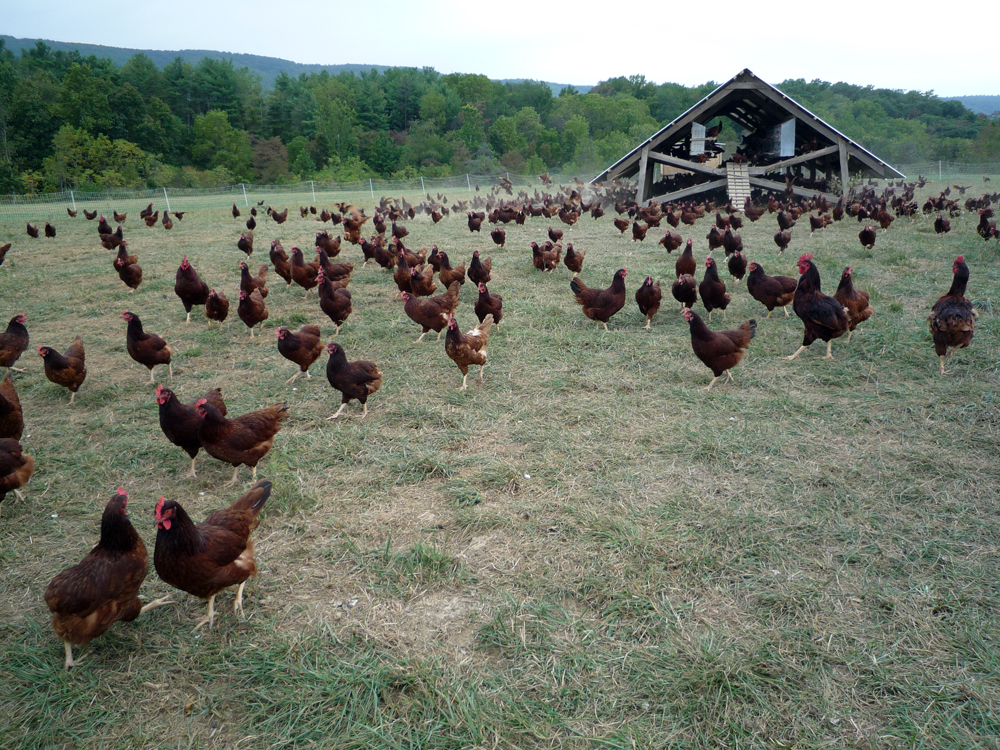
A mobile coop for free range laying hens on the farm

Salatin is criticized by poultry farmer Frank Reese in Jonathan Safran Foer's book Eating Animals for raising industrial birds, not heritage birds. Reese says of Polyface, "Joel Salatin is doing industrial birds. Call him up and ask him. So he puts them on pasture. It makes no difference. It's like putting a broken-down Honda on the autobahn and saying it's a Porsche." Salatin maintains that this statement is not entirely true. Polyface uses heritage breeds for its egg production. However, for meat birds Salatin uses the Cornish cross, the same type of bird used in the industrial system. Salatin candidly admits in his book, The Sheer Ecstasy of Being a Lunatic Farmer, that the meat bird operation is currently the least sustainable aspect of the farm. Salatin goes on to say that he looks forward to the day that customers are willing to buy (and he is able to raise) a non-industrial meat bird. Reese's critique also aims at Michael Pollan's view in his book The Omnivore's Dilemma that depicts the farming principles of Polyface as exemplary and sustainable. Salatin confirmed, in an interview with The Observer, that he raises non-heritage breed chickens. He explained that he had raised heritage birds for several years, but the poultry from these birds had gained little interest from consumers, and was therefore not economically viable for him.

The New York Times, in their article "Let Them Eat Acorns", quotes unspecified individuals: "Some say he is cheating the notion of sustainability by feeding his pigs grain that he does not grow himself. Others contend that confinement operations are the only practical way to feed the world, and that pastured animals do more damage to the environment than is acknowledged in this farm-to-table era."

After Polyface's 2019 growing season, a website went live that claimed to be run by the season's former interns, it is entitled One Experience of Many. The website includes both positive and negative reviews of the farm and the family who run it, the reviewers all discuss substandard housing, which is alleged to include known negligence of water quality standards and the poisoning of 10 out of 11 interns. One of the reviewers, Emma, reports two hospital visits due to a bacterial infection from their housing's water supply including a diagnosis of campylobacteriosis. The interns' allegations also include crude and manipulative behavior on the part of farm ownership and management, along with low pay and little educational value.

=== COVID-19 pandemic ===
Polyface Farm repeatedly violated COVID-19 pandemic protocols by holding various gatherings. Salatin regularly expressed in his blog "Musings from The Lunatic Farmer" that he believes that COVID is not a danger and that it should not be taken so seriously. He implied that 5G may be the true cause of COVID. In March of 2020, he wrote: "Okay folks, enough is enough. I want coronavirus. I've been watching all the personal stories of the folks who have gotten it and the overwhelming testimony is pretty simple: a day of sniffles, another day of fatigue, then a couple of days of recovery, and life is back to normal." While criticism of Joel Salatin and Polyface for minimizing COVID-19's impact were widespread the farm continued to host large and mostly maskless events well into the fall of 2020.

== See also ==
- Regenerative agriculture
- Sustainable agriculture
- Holistic management
