= Jo Robinson =

Jo Robinson may refer to:

- Jo Ann Robinson, American civil rights activist.
- Jo Robinson (author), American author.
