= Joel Salatin =

American farmer, lecturer, and author (born 1957)

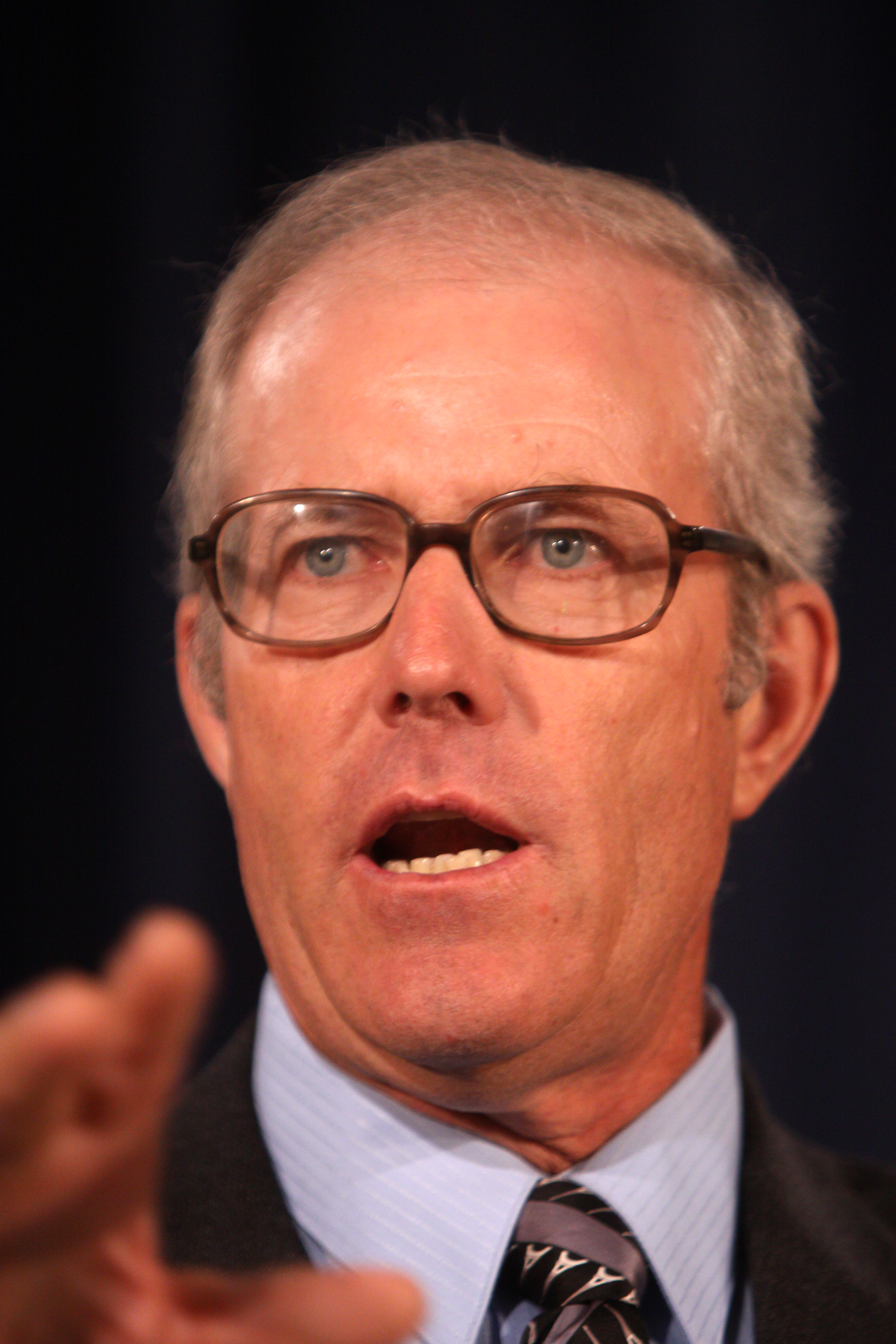
- Salatin speaking at the 2012 Liberty Political Action Conference in Chantilly, Virginia.
- Born: February 24, 1957 (age 69); Venezuela
- Occupations: Farmer, lecturer, and author

Joel F. Salatin (born February 24, 1957) is an American farmer, lecturer, and author.

Salatin raises livestock on his Polyface Farm in Swoope, Virginia, in the Shenandoah Valley. Meat from the farm is sold by direct marketing to consumers and restaurants.

== Early life and education ==
Salatin's father worked for a major petroleum company, Texas Oil, using his earnings to purchase a 1,000-acre farm in Venezuela. Salatin describes in his book You Can Farm how his family were involved in “wildcat oil drilling,” and after “clearing some of the jungle” to establish a chicken and dairy farm, "in a totally free market…without government regulations” they quickly “cornered the poultry market.” The family left Venezuela in 1959 following the 1958 election of President Rómulo Betancourt who instituted a program to redistribute land.

Influenced by their Biblical understanding of earth stewardship and J. I. Rodale, Salatin's parents, William and Lucille, relocated and purchased a farm in the Shenandoah Valley in 1961 and began restoring its land. In high school, Salatin began his own business selling rabbits, eggs, butter and chicken from the farm at the Staunton Curb Market. He then attended Bob Jones University where he majored in English and was a student leader, graduating in 1979.

Salatin married his childhood sweetheart Teresa in 1980 and became a feature writer at the Staunton, Virginia, newspaper, The News Leader, where he had worked earlier typing obituaries and police reports.

== Career ==
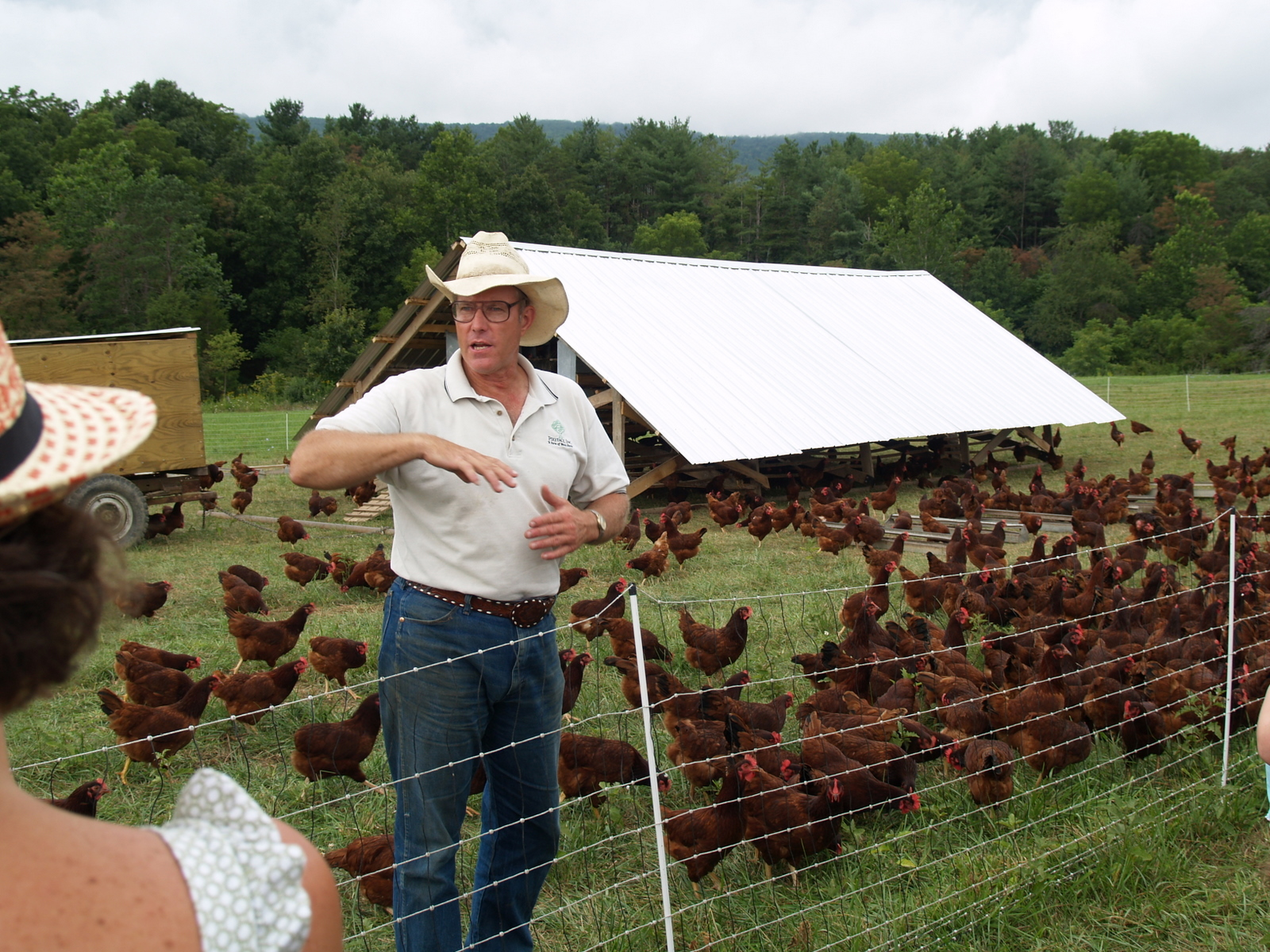
Salatin with a flock of hens near their portable coop, surrounded by predator-deterrent electric netting

=== Farming ===
Polyface Farm is a 550-acre (220-hectare) farm in Swoope, Virginia. The farmhouse was built in 1750 and added on to throughout the years. It was purchased by the Salatins in 1961. Tired of writing for the newspaper, Salatin decided to try farming full-time. Each year, he revised his organic farming techniques, which have low overhead and equipment costs, and the farm began to turn a profit. In 2005 the farm grossed $350,000 and is deemed a commercial farm by the United States Department of Agriculture.

Salatin's philosophy of farming emphasizes healthy grass on which animals can thrive in a symbiotic cycle of feeding. Cows are moved from one pasture to another rather than being centrally corn fed. Chickens in portable coops are moved in behind them, where they dig through the cow dung to eat protein-rich fly larvae while further fertilizing the field with their droppings.

Salatin condemns the negative impact of the United States government on his livelihood because of what he considers an increasingly regulatory approach taken toward farming. He is a self-described "Christian libertarian environmentalist capitalist lunatic farmer", producing meat he describes as "beyond organic", using environmentally responsible, ecologically beneficial, sustainable agriculture. Jo Robinson said of Salatin, "He's not going back to the old model. There's nothing in county extension or old-fashioned ag science that really informs him. He is just looking totally afresh at how to maximize production in an integrated system on a holistic farm. He's just totally innovative."

=== Writing ===
Salatin has been editor of the monthly agriculture magazine Stockman Grass Farmer promoting pasture-grazed livestock, and teaches a two-day course on agribusiness marketing in conjunction with this magazine. He has authored seventeen books including Folks, This Ain't Normal, You Can Farm, Salad Bar Beef and Everything I Want to Do Is Illegal.

In November 2019 Salatin wrote a blog post responding to a blog post by Chris Newman, another Virginia farmer and owner of Sylvanaqua Farms, in which Newman critiques the small family farm model and describes an alternative, vertically integrated system rooted in collective ownership. Salatin said in his article that Newman, who is black and Native American, was too early in his farming career to know whether he would be successful in the long-term, and that Newman would only "push would-be team players away" by complaining - writing "The problem with disagreeing with Chris is that I'll be called a racist [...] Is it more racist to play the race card to anybody who dares disagree with you than it is to actually be a racist?" and concluding "When I think of William Cody mounting a U.S. Postal Service Pony Express horse at the age of 13 and riding through paths lined with hostile Native Americans, I wonder where he is today. Fortunately, he's here; rare, but here." In August 2020, an AGDAILY writer described Salatin's blog post as appearing racially inappropriate, and the publication referenced the criticism Salatin received in his attempt to discredit Newman. After Salatin's remarks, Mother Earth News created the "Voices" initiative for the publication for diversity in the wake of the murder of George Floyd. After public criticism of the publication's support for Salatin, Mother Earth News ultimately severed its relationship with Salatin. Salatin said that his blog "routinely offends big ag, bureaucrats, big pharma, etc, on purpose. But I never intend to offend people due to their race, religion, culture, gender, or creed and I’m sorry that this post did."

In March 2020, during the COVID-19 pandemic, on his website, Salatin said he wanted coronavirus. The Washington Post published an article that was critical of his statement.

=== Speaking ===
Salatin has spoken as a farming educator at a wide range of organizations including the University of California at Berkeley, and the Stone Barns Center for Food and Agriculture. In 2020, he spoke at the Libertarian National Convention about limiting regulation.

== Media ==
Salatin's farm, Polyface, is featured prominently in Michael Pollan's book The Omnivore's Dilemma (2006) and the documentary films, Food, Inc. and Fresh. Pollan became interested in Salatin because of his refusal to send food to locations beyond a four-hour drive of his farm, i.e. outside his local "foodshed". "We want [prospective customers] to find farms in their areas and keep the money in their own community", he said. "We think there is strength in decentralization and spreading out rather than in being concentrated and centralized."

Salatin and his farm have also been featured in radio, television and print media including Smithsonian Magazine, National Geographic, Gourmet, and ABC News.

In 2025, Angel Studios published the documentary The Lunatic Farmer about Joel and his farm.

== Awards ==
Salatin received the 15th Annual Heinz Award with special focus on the environment.

Received the American Pastured Poultry Producers (APPPA.org) Lifetime Achievement Award for his contributions to the pastured poultry movement.

== Works ==
- Salad Bar Beef (1996). ISBN 978-0-9638109-1-5
- Pastured Poultry Profits (1996). ISBN 978-0-9638109-0-8
- You Can Farm: The Entrepreneur's Guide to Start & Succeed in a Farming Enterprise (1998). ISBN 978-0-9638109-2-2
- Family Friendly Farming: A Multigenerational Home-Based Business Testament (2001). ISBN 978-0-9638109-3-9
- Holy Cows and Hog Heaven: The Food Buyer's Guide to Farm Friendly Food (2005). ISBN 978-0-9638109-4-6
- Everything I Want to Do Is Illegal: War Stories from the Local Food Front (2007). ISBN 978-0-9638109-5-3
- The Sheer Ecstasy of Being a Lunatic Farmer (2010). ISBN 978-0-9638109-6-0
- Folks, This Ain't Normal: A Farmer's Advice for Happier Hens, Healthier People, and a Better World. Center Street. 2011. ISBN 978-0-89296-819-0.
- Fields of Farmers: Interning, Mentoring, Partnering, Germinating (2013). ISBN 978-0-9638109-7-7
- The Marvelous Pigness of Pigs (2016). ISBN 978-1455536979
- Your Successful Farm Business: Production, Profit, Pleasure (2017). ISBN 978-0-96381-098-4
- Polyface Designs: A Comprehensive Construction Guide for Scalable Farming Infrastructure (2020). ISBN 978-1-7336866-1-7 (together with Chris Slattery)
- Polyface Micro: Success with Livestock on a Homestead Scale (2021). ISBN 978-1-7336866-2-4
- Homestead Tsunami: Good for Country, Critters, and Kids (2023). ISBN 978-1-7336866-3-1

== See also ==
- Methanotroph
- Permaculture
- Regenerative agriculture
