= Intervale =

Intervale may refer to:

- A valley

== Locations ==
- Intervale, New Hampshire, a village in the towns of Bartlett and Conway
- Intervale, Virginia, a village in Allegheny County
- Intervale (Augusta County, Virginia), a historic house
- Intervale Avenue (IRT White Plains Road Line), a New York City Subway station
- Intervale Factory, a historic factory building in Haverhill, Massachusetts
