= Us vs. Them (disambiguation) =

"Us vs. Them" is a song by American hip hop duo Suicideboys.

Us vs. Them may also refer to:

- "Us vs. Them" (Unc & Phew song), 2022
- "Us v Them", a song by LCD Soundsystem from Sound of Silver
- "Us vs. Them", a song by Spring King from A Better Life
- Us Vs. Them, a 1984 arcade LaserDisc game by Mylstar Electronics

== See also ==
- Us and Them (disambiguation)
