= Second Nature (book) =

1991 book by Michael Pollan

- 1991 reprint cover
- Author: Michael Pollan
- Language: English
- Publisher: Atlantic Monthly Press
- Publication date: 1991
- Media type: Print
- Pages: 258
- ISBN: 9780871134431
- OCLC: 30147105
- Followed by: A Place of My Own

Second Nature: A Gardener's Education was Michael Pollan's first book. It is a collection of essays about gardening arranged by seasons.

It is listed in the American Horticultural Society's 75 Great American Garden Books.

In the book, Pollan describes the relationship between the wild and gardens, nature vs. cultivation, and nature vs. chemicals. He discusses the difficulty of raising roses, which have become so specialized that they can no longer survive in the wild.
