= River Road Entertainment =

U.S. independent film production company

- Type: Private
- Industry: Entertainment
- Founded: 1987; 39 years ago
- Founder: Bill Pohlad
- Headquarters: 250 Nicollet Mall Suite 600 Minneapolis, MN. 55401
- Key people: Bill Pohlad (president)
- Website: RiverRoadEntertainment.com

River Road Entertainment is an American independent film production company founded in 1987 by Bill Pohlad, who is also the company's president. It is based in Los Angeles and Minneapolis. Films produced by River Road include 12 Years A Slave, The Tree of Life, and American Utopia. Other titles include Into the Wild, Wild, Fair Game, Love & Mercy (which Pohlad also directed), Brokeback Mountain, A Prairie Home Companion, and A Monster Calls, as well as feature documentary films, including Food, Inc.

== History ==
Bill Pohlad founded River Road Entertainment in 1987.

In October 2006, veteran Frank Hildebrand was appointed head of production, ex-director of Film Finance Corporation Australia, Deborah Zisper took care of the business.

In September 2007, Mitch Horwits was promoted to president of the company.

In July 2008, River Road invested in the financing of The Runaways, a biopic about the history of one of the American female rock and roll bands of the 1970s, named The Runaways, which included Joan Jett, Cherie Curie, and the late Sandy West.

In April 2017, Gray Rembert joined the company as executive vice president after he left GK Films.

In June 2020, Kim Roth was appointed co-president and creative director of the company, then promoted Christa Zofcin Workman to co-president and COO.

In October 2024, StudioCanal acquired international distribution rights (excluding UK rights to The Tree of Life, retained by Searchlight Pictures) to 11 films produced by River Road across theatrical, television, SVOD and other media.

== Films ==
| Release date | Title | Director(s) | Distributor(s) | Co-production with |
|---|---|---|---|---|
| December 9, 2005 | Brokeback Mountain | Ang Lee | Focus Features | Alberta Film Entertainment, Good Machine |
| June 9, 2006 | A Prairie Home Companion | Robert Altman | Picturehouse, New Line Cinema | GreeneStreet Films, Sandcastle 5 Productions, Prairie Home Productions, Armenia Film Studio |
| November 10, 2006 | Fur | Steven Shainberg | Picturehouse | Edward R. Pressman Film, Iron Films, Vox3 Films, Furthefilm LLC |
| September 21, 2007 | Into the Wild | Sean Penn | Paramount Vantage | Paramount Vantage, Square One C.I.H. and Linson Film |
| September 24, 2007 | Lust, Caution | Ang Lee | Focus Features | Haishang Films, Sil-Metropole Organisation |
| February 29, 2008 | Chicago 10 | Brett Morgen | Roadside Attractions | Consolidated Documentaries, Participant Productions, Curious Pictures |
| June 12, 2009 | Food, Inc. | Robert Kenner | Magnolia Pictures | Dogwoof Pictures, Participant Media |
| March 19, 2010 | The Runaways | Floria Sigismondi | Appartition | Linson Entertainment |
| October 1, 2010 | Fair Game | Doug Liman | Summit Entertainment (United States); Gulf Film (United Arab Emirates) | Participant Media, Weed Road Pictures, Hypnotic, Zucker Productions |
| May 27, 2011 | The Tree of Life | Terrence Malick | Fox Searchlight Pictures | Plan B Entertainment |
| November 8, 2013 | 12 Years a Slave | Steve McQueen | Fox Searchlight Pictures (United States); Entertainment One Films (United Kingdom and Ireland); Lionsgate Films (International) | Fox Searchlight Pictures, Summit Entertainment, Regency Enterprises, Plan B Entertainment, New Regency Productions, Film4 Productions |
| June 5, 2015 | Love & Mercy | Bill Pohlad | Lionsgate, Roadside Attractions | Battle Mountain Films |
| September 11, 2015 | Time Out of Mind | Oren Moverman | IFC Films | Blackbird, Cold Iron Pictures, Gere Productions, QED International |
| October 7, 2016 | A Monster Calls | J. A. Bayona | Universal Pictures (Spain); Entertainment One Films (United Kingdom); Focus Features (United States) | Participant Media, Apaches Entertainment, Telecinco Cinema, Peliculas La Trini |
| June 29, 2017 | The Last Face | Sean Penn | Saban Films | FilmHaven Entertainment, Gerber Pictures, Matt Palmieri Productions |
| July 26, 2017 | Valerian and the City of a Thousand Planets | Luc Besson | EuropaCorp Distribution (France); STXfilms (United States) | EuropaCorp, TF1 Films Production, Fundamental Films, BNP Paribas, Orange Studio, Novo Pictures, Belga Films |
| October 17, 2020 | American Utopia | Spike Lee | HBO (United States/Canada); Universal Pictures (International) | HBO Films, Participant, Warner Music Entertainment, 40 Acres and a Mule Filmworks, RadicalMedia, Todomundo |
| August 4, 2023 | Dreamin' Wild | Bill Pohlad | Roadside Attractions | Zurich Avenue, Innisfree Pictures |
| November 24, 2023 | Frybread Face and Me | Billy Luther | ARRAY | MACRO, Indion Entertainment, REI Co-OP Studios, World of Wonder, Good Gravy Films, Fit Via Vi |
| April 9, 2024 | Food, Inc. 2 | Robert Kenner; Melissa Robledo | Magnolia Pictures | Participant |
| July 18, 2025 | Unicorns | Sally El Hosaini; James Krishna Floyd | Signature Entertainment (United Kingdom); Cohen Media Group (United States) | Maven Screen Media, Chromatic Aberration |
