= Food, Inc. 2 =

2023 documentary film

- Film poster
- Directed by: Robert Kenner; Melissa Robledo
- Starring: Michael Pollan; Gerardo Reyes-Chavez; Eric Schlosser
- Cinematography: Jay Redmond
- Edited by: Leonard Feinstein; Ryan Loeffler
- Music by: Mark Adler
- Production companies: Magnolia Pictures; Participant; River Road Entertainment
- Release dates: September 1, 2023 (TFF); April 9, 2024
- Running time: 94 minutes
- Country: United States
- Language: English
- Box office: $28,750

Food, Inc. 2 is a 2023 American documentary film directed by Robert Kenner and Melissa Robledo, and narrated by Michael Pollan and Eric Schlosser. It is the sequel to the 2008 film Food, Inc.. The film focuses on corporate consolidation in the American food and agriculture business.

Food, Inc. 2 premiered at the 50th Telluride Film Festival in 2023. It was given a limited theatrical release on April 12, 2024.

== Reception ==
On the review aggregator website Rotten Tomatoes, 80% of 20 critics' reviews are positive. Metacritic, which uses a weighted average, assigned the film a score of 70 out of 100, based on 6 critics, indicating "generally favorable" reviews.

Glenn Kenny of RogerEbert.com gave the film three out of four stars and wrote, "This is an engaging and watchable activist documentary that does make way for optimism in its last minutes, but doesn't, um, sugarcoat its envoi about changing our eating ways: 'Not only can we do it, we have to.'"
