= Glebe Burying Ground =

Historic cemetery in Virginia, United States

- U.S. National Register of Historic Places
- Virginia Landmarks Register
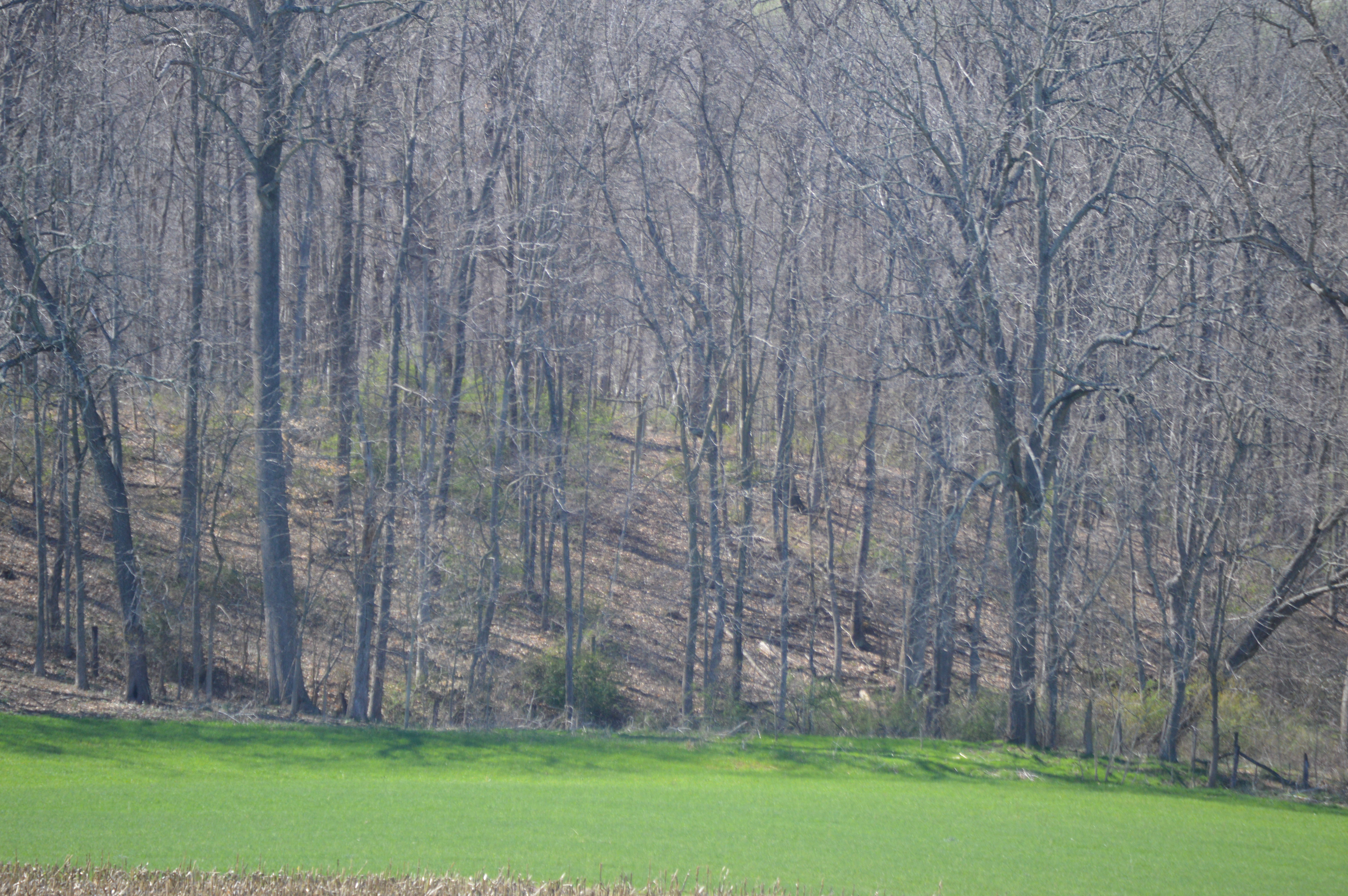
- Overview of the surrounding trees

- Location within Virginia Location within the United States
- Location: South of Swoope, Virginia, on Glebe School Road
- Coordinates: 38°6′33″N 79°13′20″W
- Area: 1 acre (0.40 ha)
- NRHP reference No.: 85002722
- VLR No.: 007-1150

Significant dates
- Added to NRHP: October 1, 1985
- Designated VLR: March 16, 1982

Glebe Burying Ground, also known as Glebe Cemetery, is a historic cemetery located near Swoope, Augusta County, Virginia. It is one of the oldest cemeteries in Augusta County and contains a wide variety of stones illustrating the evolution of local funerary art from the 1770s through the 19th century. The land that it sits on was purchased in 1749 to provide an income for the local Anglican parish, but it is unknown when the burying ground actually began to be used. It is now owned by the county.

It was listed on the National Register of Historic Places in 1985.

== History and description ==
The Augusta Parish Vestry Book records the purchase of 200 acres (81 ha) of land in 1749 to serve as the income-producing glebe for the parish and to provide a site for a church and parsonage. However the threat of attack by American Indians discouraged settlement in the area and the church was finally built in Staunton in 1760. The cemetery was probably in use before then, but the earliest legible gravestone is dated 1770 and the last 1891. The vestry petitioned the Virginia General Assembly for permission to sell the bulk of the glebe lands in 1773, but the sale was not consummated until 1802. The burying ground is now owned by Augusta County and maintained by the Augusta County Historical Society.

"The surviving stones reflect changes in the local funerary art of Scotch-Irish, English, and German settlers and their descendants. The Glebe Burying Ground contains among its surviving components several late 18th-century stones rarely found in this area of Virginia. The two oldest grave markers are flat, horizontal slabs with head and footstones. Several similar markers have been found scattered throughout the Valley of Virginia and into Southwest Virginia. This type of memorial generally marks older graves of more prominent people, suggested by the lengthy epitaphs inscribed on the horizontal slab. The style and decoration of these markers reflect the local German settlement. The head and footstones retain the traditional rounded shapes rather than the popular shouldered forms. Heart and floral designs reminiscent of German folk art embellish Mary Trimble's 1770 stone."

German traditions persisted through the early 19th century, gradually blending with popular Anglicized ideals. Stones from this period continue to be carved from a finely grained sandstone, a favorite material in German settled areas, but they begin to adopt a new round-shouldered form with single side decoration. Only a few graves still retain footstones. Several markers from the 1820s are inscribed in German with Gothic script, but the majority are written in English in a new style of lettering. Yet even after many of zhe Anglicized ideals had been adopted, German influence prevailed through the decoration. The six-point star design, along with an eight-point design, found on John Trimble's German stone were used on most sandstone markers through the mid-19th century. A cluster of five stars adorns the top of Trimble's 1824 marker. Even simpler stones received this decoration; a footstone with the initials "I.E." has been finished with a primitive six-point compass star. This style of stone, dating ca. 1810s through 1840s, is generally the earliest type found in Augusta County graveyards from the community plots to German and Scotch-Irish churches. As with houses, German and Anglicized ideals blended, creating distinctive local forms."

"By the mid-19th century, sandstone had been abandoned for the popular white marble "memorials," and round-shouldered forms had yielded to the square-shouldered shapes. These stones were embellished with the romantic images that characterized the Victorian obsession with death. Marth Ewing's 1855 marker illustrates this rich vocabulary with its willow, urn, and obelisk decoration. By the end of the century, much of the decoration had been abandoned, and the stones became smaller, chunkier, and more austere. The most recent stone is an 1891 marker for Esteline Thompson."
