= Swoope, Virginia =

Unincorporated community in Virginia, United States

- Unincorporated community
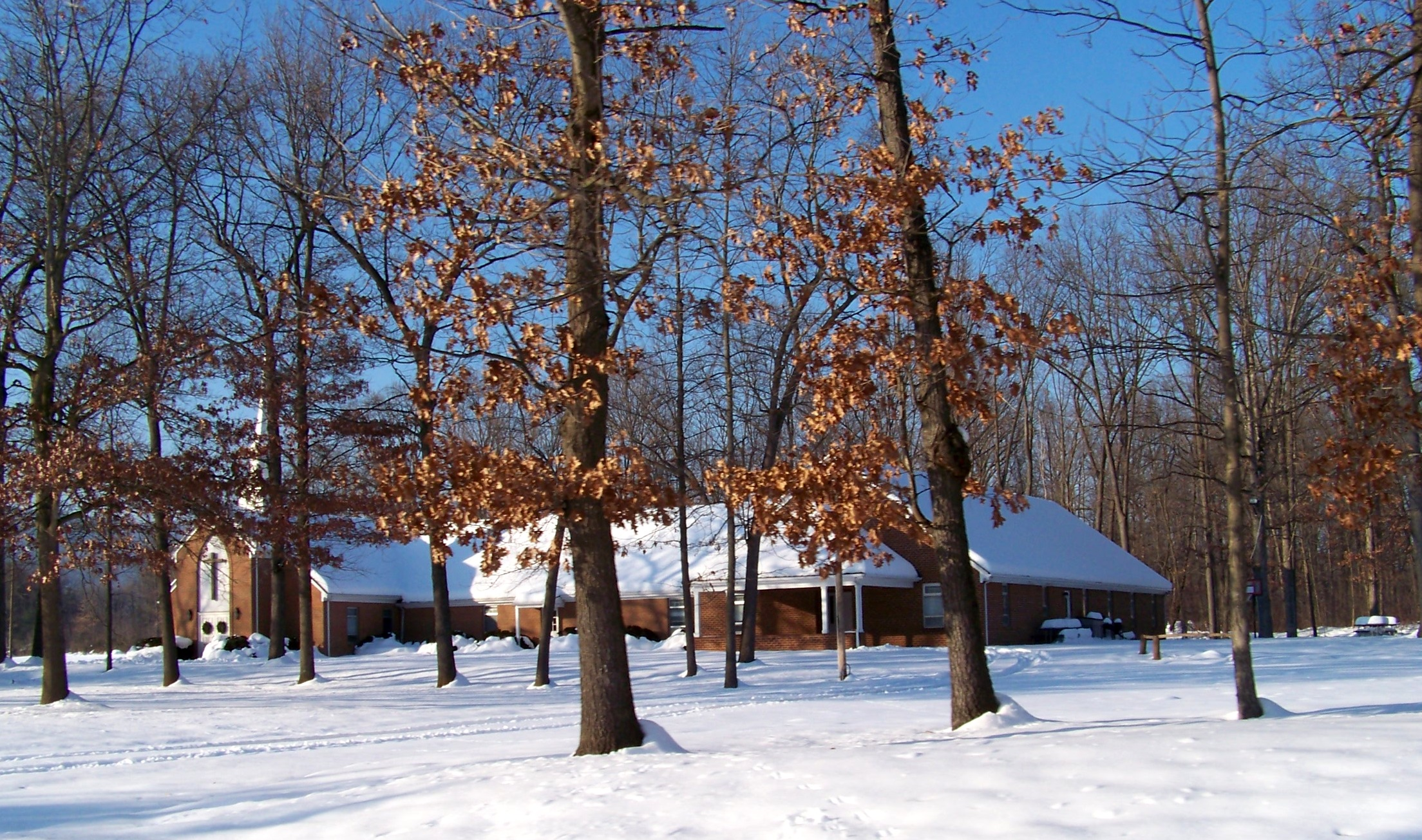
- Christian Fellowship Baptist Church in Swoope

- Location within Virginia Location within the United States
- Coordinates: 38°09′29″N 79°12′23″W
- Country: United States
- State: Virginia
- County: Augusta
- Elevation: 1,621 ft (494 m)
- Time zone: UTC−5 (Eastern (EST))
  - Summer (DST): UTC−4 (EDT)
- ZIP code: 24479
- Area code: 540
- GNIS feature ID: 1493681

Swoope (pronounced S-W-O-P-E) is an unincorporated community in Augusta County, Virginia, United States. Swoope is located on State Routes 703 and 860, 7.4 miles (11.9 km) west of Staunton. Swoope has a post office with ZIP code 24479, which opened on March 6, 1838. Polyface Farm, a sustainable farm run by Joel Salatin, is also near Swoope. Students in the area go to Beverley Manor Elementary School, Churchville Elementary School, attend Beverley Manor Middle School, and Buffalo Gap High School.

The Glebe Burying Ground, Intervale, and Lewis Shuey House are listed on the National Register of Historic Places.

== Notable people ==
- Donald DePoy, born August 10, 1949, fifth-generation bluegrass musician, music educator, and music event organizer.
- Joel Salatin, born February 24, 1957, farmer and author
- Jacob Swoope, born in 1766 in Philadelphia, PA to Col. George Michael Swope. Jacob moved to Staunton in 1789. He was the first mayor of Staunton under the new charter in 1801. He served as the mayor of Staunton, Virginia, from 1801 to 1804. He was reelected Mayor of Staunton, Virginia, and served from 1804 to 1805. He then served Virginia's 4th District (Eleventh Congress) in the United States House of Representatives from March 4, 1809, to March 3, 1811. The town of Swoope (originally "Swoope's Depot") is named for Jacob and he built his home, "Wheatlands", here in 1813. He died in 1832 and is buried in Trinity Episcopal Churchyard in Staunton.
