= Judith Belzer =

American painter

- Born: 1956 (age 69–70); Chicago, Illinois, United States
- Education: New York Studio School, Barnard College
- Known for: Oil painting, watercolors
- Spouse: Michael Pollan
- Awards: Guggenheim Fellowship
- Website: Judith Belzer

Judith Belzer, From the Anthropocene #5, oil on canvas, 60" x 60", 2015.

Judith Belzer (born 1956) is an American painter based in Berkeley, California. She is known for semi-abstract oils and watercolors depicting invented landscapes in which the natural and built worlds collide and adjoin. These hybrid scenes have been described as dynamic, distanced but expressive, and non-prescriptive—more provocative than overtly critical observations of environmental change. In an Artillery review Barbara Morris wrote, "Belzer explores the edge where the natural world interfaces with the industrialized landscape, emphasizing how rhythms and patterns found in nature are echoed in the structures that man has created … [and] conveying our anxious energy as we struggle for equilibrium in a world permanently altered by our actions."

Belzer has exhibited at venues including the Museum of Arts and Design (New York), Berkeley Art Museum (BAMPFA), Nevada Museum of Art, Contemporary Jewish Museum (San Francisco), and Mills College Art Museum. Her work belongs to the permanent collections of BAMPFA and the Nevada Museum of Art. In 2014, she received a Guggenheim Fellowship. Belzer is married to journalist and author Michael Pollan.

== Education and exhibitions ==
Belzer was born in 1956 in Chicago. She enrolled at Bennington College in 1974, where she majored in English and met Pollan; in 1979, she completed her degree at Barnard College. After graduating, she lived in Manhattan and studied art at the New York Studio School, before moving to rural Cornwall, Connecticut in the mid-1990s. During that time, she began receiving critical attention for nature-based paintings through surveys and exhibitions at Berry-Hill Galleries (1996–2005) in New York and Richardson-Clarke Gallery in Boston (1994–2000).

In 2003, Belzer moved from the East Coast to Berkeley, where the scope and sprawl of the skies, landscape and urbanized environment gradually transformed her work. Her later solo exhibitions have taken place at the Sonoma County Museum (2007), the Nevada Museum of Art (2018), and galleries including Morgan Lehman (New York, 2008–13), Valerie Carberry (Chicago, 2007–10), and George Lawson (2010–16), Anglim Trimble (2021) and Hosfelt Gallery (2022–present) in San Francisco.

== Work and reception ==
Belzer's art is unified by a sustained engagement with and gradually expanding conception of what "nature" comprises. Critics have characterized her approach as an inquiry into underlying patterns of natural and social life, which has moved freely from crystalline and cellular to aerial perspectives. Working at the landscape level inspired formal shifts that coalesced to create the playful, frenetic energy of her later paintings. These include: an intensified color palette; gestural, linear mark-making that observers connect to text and her early studies in language; sweeping graphic patterning like a cartographical shorthand; and off-balance, vertiginous views with multiple vantage points.

Judith Belzer, Trunk #3, diptych, oil on canvas, 40" x 108", 2006.

Belzer's later work has been likened to the quasi-abstract landscapes of Wayne Thiebaud and Richard Diebenkorn; however, unlike those works, her landscapes are non-specific geographic inventions that are chaotic and sometimes dystopian rather than serene. In this vein, critic DeWitt Cheng wrote, Belzer's "oils resemble colored pencil drawings made by lapsed Impressionists suffering from a certain Expressionist anxiety—like van Gogh or Munch … [or] all-over fields of energy in the spirit of Abstract Expressionism."

=== Painting, 1992–09 ===
Belzer's painting in the 1990s and early 2000s approached everyday nature—marshes, bramble, winter berries, leaves—with an intimate, quiet focus that produced realistically observed, yet expressionistically rendered studies of form and suffused light. While still descriptive, these works became increasingly abstract and atmospheric, and less bound to dimensional references such as the horizon line. Critic Karen Wilkin called them "lyrical, Asian-inspired paintings [that] distill landscape into suggestive fragments seen close up": flights of leaves, branches and organic shapes set against muted oil washes that evoked the transience of seasons and life and ranged in mood from meditative to exuberant. Other writers related this work to post-war all-over painting, calligraphy, Giovanni Battista Tiepolo and Monet.

After moving to the West, Belzer shifted to larger forms—oak and eucalyptus trees—in detailed, monumental works that examined rotting trunks, exfoliating limbs and densely interwoven branches, whose patterns echoed those of organic forms such as skin tissue, body parts, mountainsides. Her "Inner Life of Trees" series (2007–08) often employed multiple panels. Fusing realism and abstraction, they evoked a sense of penetrating trees' interiors or physically tracing concentric rings and bark ridges that echoed the movement and rhythms of ocean waves or sand. The "Order of Things" paintings (2009–10) combined a sense of scientific naturalism with expressionist abstraction in examinations of patterns created by natural processes (e.g., cracks and fissures in lateral sections) that seemed to connections micro and macro (landforms, city maps) structures and surfaces.

Judith Belzer, All That is Solid #24, oil on canvas, 96" x 84", 2021.

=== Painting series, 2010–present ===
Living in the hills of Berkeley, Belzer was increasingly informed by her view of the Bay, shipyards and Golden Gate National Recreation Area, in which mountain and maritime landscapes seemed to blur with industrial outlooks and infrastructure. She reimagined and reworked these scenes in her "Through Lines" (2010–12), "Edgelands" (2012–13) and "Anthropocene" (2013–4) series, sketchy panoramas that depicted abstracted freeways, refineries, bridges and parking lots intersecting and jostling against fields, marshes and organic forms. San Francisco critic Jonathan Curiel wrote of the latter series, the "work is an explosive torrent of colorful wiggles, swirls, triangulations, crests, gradations, and vistas that are aerial maps of Belzer's active imagination … [her] canvases capture this crazy quilt of connected parts, all from distorted bird's-eye perspectives and all with an artistic energy, playfulness and freneticism."

Critics contend Belzer's work explores an evolving, precarious human-nature relationship, conveying both an unease at the hubris of humanity and a sense of vitality and dynamism. In two subsequent series—the "Panama Project" (2015–16) and "HalfEmptyHalfFull" (circa 2017–18)—she dealt with massive examples of the relentless push for industrial development: the construction of Western U.S. dams and the Panama Canal. Supported by a Guggenheim fellowship, Belzer travelled to Panama to observe the famed canal being widened and deepened; the resulting paintings depicted blank, skyscraper-like cargo ship hulls traversing the passageway that suggest contemporary human-made "landscapes" as substitute sources of wonder and awe for nature.

Belzer's subsequent "All That Is Solid" series (2020–22) presented a visual counterpart to the linear nature of prior work. They depict spare, loosely painted large and small boulders hanging in space against voids of misty, unnatural pastel washes, which suggested stop-action avalanches. Critic David Roth deemed them nods "to 19th-century romantic landscape painting and its representations of the sublime" that balanced as comic and catastrophic metaphors for the era's shifting environmental and political ground.

== Recognition ==
Belzer has received a John Simon Guggenheim Memorial Foundation Fellowship in 2014, a Yaddo artist residency in 2007, and a fellowship from the Yale School of Art in 1982. She has been a visiting lecturer at the School of the Museum of Fine Arts at Tufts in 2015 and at Harvard University from 2017 to 2024. Her work belongs to the public art collections of the Berkeley Art Museum, Mills College Art Museum, and Nevada Museum of Art.
