= Cooked: A Natural History of Transformation =

2013 book by Michael Pollan

- Author: Michael Pollan
- Language: English
- Publisher: Penguin Press
- Publication date: 2013
- Publication place: United States
- Media type: Paperback
- Pages: 480
- ISBN: 978-1-59420-421-0
- Preceded by: Food Rules: An Eater's Manual
- Followed by: How to Change Your Mind

Cooked: A Natural History of Transformation is a 2013 book by Michael Pollan. It details Pollan's attempt to learn how to cook several different foods, including barbecue pork, bread, and cheese. He said he wanted to further his culinary education to better feed his family and connect with his teenage son. In Cooked, Pollan asserts that cooking helped modern man evolve and become culturally sophisticated. The book is divided into four sections—Earth, Air, Fire, and Water—and he details how they influence the cooking process.

== Reception ==
Paul Levy of The Guardian wrote: "A major work by an interesting thinker, this genre-busting volume will someday become a standard text in a standard university department—though no satisfactory one yet exists—that will teach and research the discipline of "Food Studies", encompassing economics, history, philosophy, anthropology, several fields of life sciences and the humanities."

In 2017, feminist philosopher Mary C Rawlinson writing in The Routledge Guide to Cooking described Pollan as focused on masculine cooking methods, such as barbequing, and accused him of "taking for granted" women's domestic kitchen labor.

== TV series ==
The book was adapted by Netflix into a four-part documentary series, Cooked, released on 19 February 2016. The series is produced by Alex Gibney, and Michael Pollan narrates each episode, which is themed on the four sections of the book—Fire, Water, Air and Earth.
