= In Defense of Food =

2008 book by Michael Pollan

- Author: Michael Pollan
- Language: English
- Publisher: Penguin Press
- Publication date: January 1, 2008
- Publication place: United States
- Media type: Print (hardcover)
- Pages: 256
- ISBN: 0-14-314274-7
- OCLC: 173243755
- Dewey Decimal: 617.4/810440922 B 22
- LC Class: RC1045.P78 M57 2008
- Preceded by: The Omnivore's Dilemma
- Followed by: Food Rules

In Defense of Food: An Eater's Manifesto (released internationally as In Defence of Food) is a 2008 book by journalist and activist Michael Pollan. It was number one on the New York Times Non-Fiction Best Seller List for six weeks. The book grew out of Pollan's 2007 essay Unhappy Meals published in the New York Times Magazine. Pollan has also said that he wrote In Defense of Food as a response to people asking him what they should eat after having read his previous book, The Omnivore's Dilemma.

In the book, Pollan explores the relationship between nutritionism and the Western diet, postulating that the answer to healthy eating is simply to "Eat food. Not too much. Mostly plants." Pollan argues that nutritionism as an ideology has overcomplicated and harmed American eating habits. He says that rather than focusing on eating nutrients, people should focus on eating the sort of food that their ancestors would recognize, implying that much of what Americans eat today is not real food, but "imitations of food". In the book, he distinguishes between food and "edible foodlike substances". Pollan recommends that Americans spend more money and time on food, and buy locally.

Pollan argues that the science of nutrition should not influence people's eating habits because a full range of nutrients has yet to be identified by scientists, and claims that the more focused Americans become on nutrition, the less healthy they seem to become.

In 2009, the University of Wisconsin–Madison selected In Defense of Food as the inaugural book of its Common Read program Go Big Read. A professor from the university's department of dairy science wrote to oppose this decision, saying that Pollan's writing expressed "an individual's biased and disputed view of today's food and agricultural systems."

In 2015, In Defense of Food was adapted into a television documentary for PBS.
