= A World Appears =

2026 book by Michael Pollan

A World Appears: A Journey Into Consciousness
- First edition cover
- Author: Michael Pollan
- Language: English
- Subject: Consciousness
- Publisher: Penguin Press
- Publication date: February 24, 2026
- Publication place: United States
- Pages: 320
- ISBN: 978-1-9848-8199-1

A World Appears: A Journey Into Consciousness is a 2026 book by Michael Pollan that explores the science of consciousness. It was released in the United States on February 24, 2026, and received mostly positive reviews from critics. It was a finalist for the 2026 Kirkus Prize.

== Synopsis ==
The book opens with a 1998 wager between neuroscientist Christof Koch and philosopher David Chalmers. Koch bet that science would identify a physical basis for consciousness within 25 years but was forced to concede the bet in 2023 after no firm answer to the question had been found. Throughout the book, Pollan interrogates a wide range of hypotheses related to consciousness, including plant perception and artificial consciousness.

== Development history ==
Pollan, best known for his writing on food, turned to mind-altering drugs in How to Change Your Mind (2018) and This Is Your Mind on Plants (2021). He was inspired to write A World Appears after taking magic mushrooms, which left him convinced that the plants around him were sentient.

=== Publication history ===
A World Appears was published by Penguin Press in the United States and Allen Lane in the United Kingdom, with an initial release date of February 24, 2026.

== Reception ==
The book received positive reception from critics upon release and became a New York Times bestseller. It was recommended by John Banville in the Financial Times and Sebastian Faulks in The Spectator, with the former describing the book as "beautifully written" and the latter writing that the book was "touched with brilliance." The Economist noted the book as being consistently engaging despite not reaching a firm conclusion on the nature of consciousness, while The Guardian wrote that Pollan's status as a science writer "schooled in the humanities" made the book extremely readable. Kirkus Reviews published a starred review that praised the book's breadth of coverage, while Publishers Weekly described the writing as "accessible and entertaining." Library Journal was also positive, praising the prose in a starred review.

Reception from academics was also generally positive, with Christof Koch writing in Nature that the book was beautifully crafted and Ned Block writing in Science that it was "charming, witty, insightful, and eccentric." Tim Crane wrote a more critical review for The Times Literary Supplement, complimenting the book's easy-to-read prose but criticizing the organization of the book. Crane specifically argued that the book had "rather too much about plants" and that "philosophy did not get enough of a look-in." Several reviewers, including Slate's Laura Miller and Sarah Moss, criticized the book for not taking a firmer stance on the subject matter.

A World Appears was named to Barack Obama's 2026 summer reading list and was a finalist for the 2026 Kirkus Prize.
