= The Botany of Desire =

2001 book by Michael Pollan

- Author: Michael Pollan
- Language: English
- Genre: Non-fiction
- Publisher: Random House
- Publication date: 2001
- Media type: Print
- Pages: 271
- ISBN: 0-375-50129-0
- Preceded by: A Place of My Own
- Followed by: The Omnivore's Dilemma

The Botany of Desire: A Plant's-Eye View of the World is a 2001 nonfiction book by journalist Michael Pollan. Pollan presents case studies mirroring four types of human desires that are reflected in the way that we selectively grow, breed, and genetically engineer plants. Each of the book's four parts discusses a different plant and a corresponding human desire for which it historically has been cultivated: the apple for sweetness; the tulip for beauty; cannabis for intoxication; and the potato for control.

The stories presented are a blend of plant science and natural history, ranging from the true story of Johnny Appleseed, to Pollan's first-hand research with sophisticated cannabis hybrids in Amsterdam, to the paradigm-shifting possibilities of genetically engineered potatoes. Pollan also discusses the limitations of monoculture, specifically the adoption in Ireland of a single breed of potato (the Irish Lumper) which made the Irish population who depended on it in the 1840s inordinately vulnerable to a fungus to which the breed had no resistance, resulting in the Great Famine. Farmers in Peru, where the potato had ultimately originated, traditionally grew hundreds of distinct varieties, minimizing their exposure to any given pest and thereby the risk of famine.

== PBS documentary ==
The book was used as the basis for The Botany of Desire, a two-hour program broadcast by PBS.

== Publication data ==
- Michael Pollan, The Botany of Desire (2001) Random House, hardcover: ISBN 0-375-50129-0, 2002 paperback: ISBN 0-375-76039-3

== See also ==
- Coevolution
- List of books about cannabis
