= Let's Go to Prison =

2006 film by Bob Odenkirk

- Theatrical release poster
- Directed by: Bob Odenkirk
- Written by: Robert Ben Garant; Thomas Lennon; Michael Patrick Jann
- Based on: You Are Going to Prison by Jim Hogshire
- Produced by: Marc Abraham; Matt Berenson; Paul Young
- Starring: Dax Shepard; Will Arnett; Chi McBride; David Koechner; Dylan Baker; Michael Shannon
- Cinematography: Ramsey Nickell
- Edited by: Eric L. Beason; Denis Thorlaksen
- Music by: Alan Elliott
- Production companies: Carsey-Werner Productions; Strike Entertainment
- Distributed by: Universal Pictures
- Release date: November 17, 2006
- Running time: 90 minutes
- Country: United States
- Language: English
- Budget: $4 million
- Box office: $4.6 million

Let's Go to Prison is a 2006 American comedy film, written by Reno 911 and The State producers, Thomas Lennon and Robert Ben Garant, and Michael Patrick Jann. The film was directed by Bob Odenkirk and starring Dax Shepard, Will Arnett, and Chi McBride. In the film a serial violent criminal (Shepard), after being frequently sentenced by the same harsh judge, unfairly plots to send the judges son (Arnett) to join him behind bars in the same facility. Although events and circumstances do not happen as either one suspected or assumed. The film was very loosely based on the book, You Are Going to Prison by Jim Hogshire. The film was the product of creative interference on the part of the studio, according to Odenkirk.

It was released in theaters on November 17, 2006 by Universal Pictures, and mainly received negative reviews from critics.

== Plot ==
After serving three prison sentences, repeat offender John Lyshitski plots revenge on Judge Nelson Biederman III, a tough judge who presided over each of his trials, passing him stiff sentences. John calls the courthouse to determine when he will next preside over a case, only to discover that he died three days before John's release.

John turns his attention to the late judge's obnoxious son, Nelson Biederman IV. At a dedication ceremony for Judge Biederman, he breaks into Nelson's car, emptying his emergency inhaler. After the ceremony, John stalks Nelson in his van; a hyperventilating Nelson frantically searches through a pharmacy's shelves for a new inhaler, with his erratic behavior making the owners think he is a junkie and mistake him for a violent robber. The police arrive and arrest Nelson. John is ecstatic that Nelson has landed in the criminal justice system which he suffered in for so long at the hands of Nelson's father.

Charged with felony assault, Nelson demands that the Biederman Foundation get him acquitted. The board nearly complies, but realizing they were fed up with Nelson's abuse, intentionally provided him with a grossly incompetent defense team at the trial. The jury find Nelson guilty and he is sentenced to three to five years in state prison. John, not satisfied with Nelson merely going to prison, decides to get himself arrested by purposely selling narcotics to undercover cops, despite seeing through the Cheech & Chong ruse. At his trial before the same judge Nelson had, John pleads guilty and convinces her he should be sentenced to three to five years in the same prison as Nelson.

John bribes a prison guard to become Nelson's cellmate, pretends to be his friend, and gives Nelson terrible advice on surviving in prison. Despite being an unhardened and inexperienced prisoner, Nelson gets himself out of the many situations that John's misinformation creates. He meets G-Lords leader Barry, an imposing, brawny African-American gay man who coerces him into a relationship. Despite his intimidating appearance, Barry is a sensitive romantic, supplying potential romantic partners with his finest toilet-made Merlot.

Nelson angers White Kingdom leader Lynard by ratting him out on a prison shanking, who vows to kill him after being thrown in the hole. After Lynard is released, Nelson acquires a syringe containing deadly chemicals to commit suicide; before he can do so, Lynard attacks him in his cell. The syringe falls out of Nelson's pocket, Lynard assumes it is narcotics and injects himself, accidentally killing himself, and Nelson earns the respect of and authority over the White Kingdom.

Nelson reaches his one-year parole hearing relatively unharmed, and as the new leader of the white supremacist gang for "killing" Lynard. Nelson, who initially submits to being Barry's partner out of fear, grows to care for him, willingly playing along with the "relationship" to keep him happy. Nelson also protects Barry from Lynard's former cronies, who are now loyal to him.

Frustrated with Nelson's newfound respect, John drugs Nelson's can of Fresca and tattoos "white power" onto his forehead along with other Nazi emblems to sabotage his parole hearing. Nelson's parole is denied and the board recommends he serves the full sentence. Enraged, Nelson confronts John, who confesses to framing Nelson, making it clear it was his father who made John the man he was, and they fight. The head guard, Shanahan, and his men intervene and set up a death match between the two prisoners, one where both men are killed regardless of the outcome. Several bets are placed in this fight.

However, John and Nelson decide to finally call truce on their rivalry, and instead secretly come up with a way for them both to escape out of prison, using the prison brawl and fight as a distraction. When the fight comes, John and Nelson inject each other with a coma-inducing drug. The guards and prisoners believe they are dead and bury them. Just before the death match, Nelson had legally chosen Barry as his common law partner, who has been paroled, so he retakes control of the Biederman Foundation. Barry uses the Biederman Foundation's funds to bribe the mortician to skip the autopsy and later digs up John and Nelson after the "funeral". John, Nelson, and Barry begin a new chapter on life, by starting a winery company, with all three being both professional and personal friends.

== Cast ==
- Dax Shepard as John Lyshitski, a career felon who sought to assassinate the judge that put him away constantly, but chose to settle for his son
  - Nick Phalen as John (8 years)
  - A.J. Balance as John (18 years)
- Will Arnett as Nelson Biederman IV, the obnoxious son of the late Judge Biederman, thrown in prison after a misunderstanding, no thanks to John
- Chi McBride as Barry, leader of the G-Lords
- David Koechner as Shanahan, head guard of the prison
- Dylan Baker as Warden
- Michael Shannon as Lynard, the sadistic leader of White Kingdom
- Miguel Nino as Jesus
- Jay Whittaker as Icepick
- Amy Hill as Judge Eva Fwae Wun, the judge who sent both Nelson and John to prison
- David Darlow as Judge Nelson Biederman III, the judge who constantly sent John to prison and Nelson IV's father
- Bob Odenkirk as Duane, Nelson's lawyer who was running the Nelson Biederman foundation while Nelson was in prison

Other notable actors appearing include Jerry Minor as a Breen guard, Susan Messing as a stripper, Jim Zulevic as Sgt. Barker and Michael Hitchcock, Tim Heidecker and Eric Wareheim as wine tasters.

== Production ==
The defunct Joliet Prison in Joliet, Illinois used for the film is the same prison featured in the beginning of The Blues Brothers (1980) and the first season of the Fox show Prison Break (2005).

The studio made significant alterations during the film's editing process that made Odenkirk unhappy with the final result. According to writers Tom Lennon and Robert Ben Garant's appearance on the Nerdist Podcast from August 23, 2011, changes included a happier ending, the removal of a sparse drums-only score recorded by Meg White of The White Stripes, and other alterations that made a significant change to the overall tone of the film.

== Reception ==
On the review aggregator website Rotten Tomatoes, 13% of 40 critics' reviews are positive, with an average rating of 3.3/10. The website's consensus reads: "Let's Go to Prison is guilty on all counts of cliched setups, base humor, and failure to ellicit laughs." Metacritic, which uses a weighted average, assigned the film a score of 27 out of 100, based on 13 critics, indicating "generally unfavorable" reviews. Audiences polled by CinemaScore gave the film an average grade of "C+" on an A+ to F scale.

Dennis Harvey of Variety wrote: "Unlike the vast majority of rude big screen comedies these days, Prison may actually improve with repeat viewings, since its best aspects are offhand enough to be missed the first time around." Frank Scheck of The Hollywood Reporter did not find the film funny, and wrote: "The few laughs this purported comedy contains are fully displayed in its far more amusing trailer".

Box Office Mojo reports that the film opened in eleventh place with a gross of $2,220,050. It closed with a domestic gross of $4,630,045.

The film has been considered a cult classic after its multiple broadcasts on Comedy Central.

== Home media ==
The film was released on DVD on August 23, 2007, with deleted scenes and an alternate ending.
