= Lewis Shuey House =

Historic house in Virginia, United States

- U.S. National Register of Historic Places
- Virginia Landmarks Register
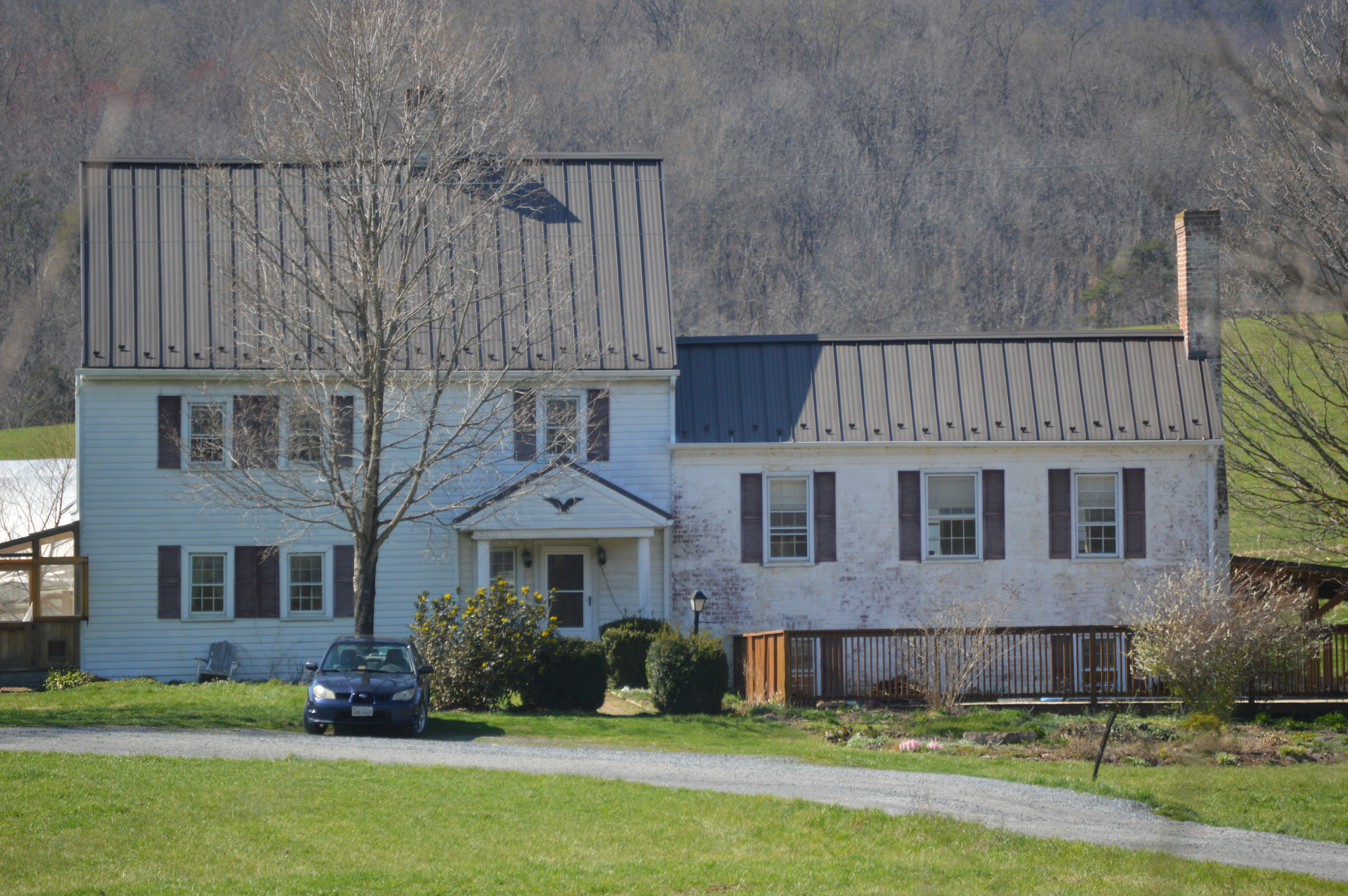
- Front of the house

- Location within Virginia Location within the United States
- Location: Shuey Road, south of Swoope, Virginia
- Coordinates: 38°7′5″N 79°13′38″W
- Area: 13 acres (5.3 ha)
- Built: c. 1795
- Architectural style: Rhenish
- NRHP reference No.: 83003261
- VLR No.: 007-0700

Significant dates
- Added to NRHP: February 10, 1983
- Designated VLR: March 16, 1982

Lewis Shuey House is a historic home located near Swoope, Augusta County, Virginia. The house was built around 1795. Also on the property are two contributing outbuildings.

It was listed on the National Register of Historic Places in 1983.
