= Food, Inc. =

2008 documentary film by Robert Kenner

- Theatrical release poster
- Directed by: Robert Kenner
- Written by: Robert Kenner; Elise Pearlstein; Kim Roberts
- Produced by: Robert Kenner; Elise Pearlstein
- Starring: Eric Schlosser; Michael Pollan
- Edited by: Kim Roberts
- Music by: Mark Adler
- Production companies: Participant Media; River Road Entertainment
- Distributed by: Magnolia Pictures
- Release dates: September 7, 2008 (TIFF); June 12, 2009 (United States)
- Running time: 94 minutes
- Country: United States
- Language: English
- Budget: $1 million
- Box office: $4.6 million

Food, Inc. is a 2008 American documentary film directed by Robert Kenner and narrated by Michael Pollan and Eric Schlosser. It examines corporate farming in the United States, concluding that agribusiness produces food that is unhealthy in a way that is environmentally harmful and abusive of both animals and employees. The film received positive reviews and was nominated for several awards, including the Academy Award for Best Documentary Feature and the Independent Spirit Award for Best Documentary Feature. A sequel, Food, Inc. 2 was released on April 12, 2024.

== Summary ==
The film examines the modern food industry, and raises alarms about both the industrial production of meat (chicken, beef, and pork) and the modern methods used to grow grains and vegetables (primarily corn and soybeans). It discusses the dominance of the American food market by a handful of huge corporations, which work to keep consumers from being aware of how their food is produced and are largely successful in their efforts to avoid such things as stronger food safety laws, the unionization of their workers, and additional food labeling regulations. These companies promote unhealthy food consumption habits among the American public and then supply cheap, inadequately safety-tested, increasingly transgenic food that is produced and transported using methods that exploit livestock, employees, farmers, and the environment and use large amounts of petroleum products. Eating organic, locally-grown food that is in season and reading product labels are offered as solutions, and the rapid growth of the organic food industry seen as providing hope for the future.

== Interviewees ==
- Eric Schlosser – Author, Fast Food Nation
- Richard Lobb – National Chicken Council
- Vince Edwards – Tyson Grower
- Carole Morison – Former Perdue Grower
- Michael Pollan – Author, The Omnivore's Dilemma
- Troy Rousch – Vice President, American Corn Growers Association
- Larry Johnson – Center for Crops Utilization Research, Iowa State University
- Allen Trenkle – Ruminant Nutrition Expert, Iowa State University
- Barbara Kowalcyk – Food Safety Advocate
- Patricia Buck – Food Safety Advocate, Barbara's Mom
- Representative Diana DeGette (D - Colorado)
- Representative Phil English (R - Pennsylvania) – Co-Sponsor of Kevin's Law
- Eldon Roth – Founder, Beef Products, Inc. (BPI)
- The Gonzalez/Orozco Family
- Rosa Soto – California Center for Public Health Advocacy
- Joel Salatin – Owner, Polyface Farms
- Eduardo Peña – Union Organizer
- Gary Hirshberg – CEO, Stonyfield Farm
- Amanda Ellis-Thurber – Organic Farmer, Lilac Ridge Farm
- Tony Airoso – Wal-Mart's Chief Dairy Purchaser
- David Runyon – Soybean Farmer
- Moe Parr – Seed Cleaner
- Stephen R. Pennell – Moe's Lawyer

== Production ==
Director Kenner spent three years producing the film. He claims he spent a large amount of his budget on legal fees to try to protect himself against lawsuits from industrial food producers, pesticide and fertilizer manufacturers, and other companies of which the film is critical. Eric Schlosser and Michael Pollan, who both appear in the film as interview subjects, are credited as "Co-Producer" and "Special Consultant", respectively.

An extensive marketing campaign was undertaken to promote the film. Stonyfield Farm, an organic yogurt maker located in New Hampshire whose CEO is featured in the film, promoted the film by printing information about it on the foil lids of 10 million cups of yogurt in June 2009.

A companion book of the same name was released in May 2009.

== Release ==
After premiering at the 2008 Toronto International Film Festival, the film was shown as a preview at the True/False Film Festival in Columbia, Missouri, in February 2009. It also screened at several film festivals in the spring before opening commercially in the United States on June 12, 2009. The film earned $61,400 from three theaters (in New York City, Los Angeles, and San Francisco) its opening weekend. On June 19, it expanded to an additional 51 theaters in large cities in the U.S. and Canada, and it made an additional $280,000 its second weekend.

The film was initially set to be released in the United Kingdom in the summer of 2009, but its release in the country was postponed until 12 February 2010.

== Response ==
The filmmakers' requests to interview representatives from such food giants as Monsanto Company, Tyson Foods, Smithfield Foods, and Perdue Farms were declined. Monsanto said it invited the filmmakers to a producers' trade show, but the filmmakers claimed they were denied press credentials at the event and were not permitted to attend. The company established a website to respond to the film's claims about their products and actions. An alliance of food production companies (led by the American Meat Institute) also created a website (SafeFoodInc.org) to respond to the claims made in the film. Cargill told the Minneapolis Star Tribune that the company welcomed "differing viewpoints on how global agriculture can affordably nourish the world while minimizing environmental impact, ensuring food safety, guaranteeing food accessibility and providing meaningful work in agricultural communities", but criticized the film's "'one-size-fits-all' answers to a task as complex as nourishing 6 billion people who are so disparately situated across the world."

Fast-food chain Chipotle offered free screenings of the film in July 2009 at various locations nationwide and stated it did things differently, which it hoped customers would appreciate after seeing the documentary.

The film's director, Robert Kenner, denied attacking the current system of producing food, saying an interview with the SF Weekly that "All we want is transparency and a good conversation about these things", though he went on to say that "the whole system is made possible by government subsidies to a few huge crops like corn. It's a form of socialism that's making us sick."

== Critical reception ==
On review aggregator website Rotten Tomatoes, the film holds an approval rating of 95% based on 114 reviews, with an average score of 7.77/10; the website's critical consensus reads: "An eye-opening expose of the modern food industry, Food, Inc. is both fascinating and terrifying, and essential viewing for any health-conscious citizen." On Metacritic, the film has a weighted average score of 80 out of 100 based on reviews from 28 critics, indicating "generally favorable" reviews.

The Staten Island Advance called the film "excellent" and "sobering", concluding: "Documentaries work when they illuminate, when they alter how we think, which renders Food, Inc. a solid success, and a must-see." The Toronto Sun called it "terrifying" and "frankly riveting". The San Francisco Examiner was equally positive, calling the film "visually stylish" and "One of the year’s most important films". The paper called the film's approach to its controversial subject matter "a dispassionate appeal to common sense" and applauded its "painstaking research and thoughtful, evenhanded commentary". The Environmental Blog sympathized with the film's message and urged viewers to "vote to change this system".

The Los Angeles Times praised 'the film's cinematography, and called it "eloquent" and "essential viewing." The Montreal Gazette noted that, despite the film's focus on American food manufacture, it is worth viewing by anyone living in a country in which large-scale food production occurs. The paper's reviewer declared the film a "must-see", but also cautioned that some of the scenes are "not for the faint of heart".

The St. Louis Post-Dispatch noted that earlier documentaries and books had examined similar issues, but still deemed the film to be worth seeing: "The food-conglomerate angle was covered in a less-ambitious documentary called King Corn, and a more-ambitious documentary called The Corporation touched on the menace of the multinationals; but this one hits the sweet spot, and it does it with style." The review concluded that the most powerful portion of the film focused on Monsanto's pursuit of legal action against farmers accused of saving and reselling or replanting Monsanto’s patented seed in violation of a signed stewardship agreement and contract not to save and resell or replant seeds produced from crops grown from Monsanto seed.

Some reviews were less positive. A commentator at Forbes magazine found the film compelling, but incomplete, writing that it "fails to address how we might feed the country—or world" using the sustainable agriculture model advocated by the filmmakers, nor does it address the critical issues of cost and access. A reviewer for The Washington Times said the film was "hamstrung" because few corporate executives wished to be interviewed, although the reviewer agreed that the filmmakers were aiming for balance.

== Awards ==
The film was nominated for the Academy Award for Best Documentary Feature at the 82nd Academy Awards, where it lost to The Cove, and for the Independent Spirit Award for Best Documentary Feature at the 25th Independent Spirit Awards, where it lost to Anvil! The Story of Anvil. It tied for fourth place in the Best Documentary category at the 35th Seattle International Film Festival.

== Sequel ==
In January 2023, Participant announced a sequel, Food, Inc. 2, to be released in late 2023, though was eventually pushed back to April 12, 2024. The documentary is a continuation of the original story. The film is being directed by Kenner and Melissa Robledo, who are being joined as producers by Schlosser and Pollan, the original film's narrators.

== See also ==
- Books
  - The Jungle (1906) – a novel exploring the American meat packing industry written by Upton Sinclair
  - Fast Food Nation (2001) – a nonfiction book about the American fast food industry written by Eric Schlosser
  - The Omnivore's Dilemma (2006) – a nonfiction book about modern food production written by Michael Pollan
  - Animal, Vegetable, Miracle (2007) – a nonfiction book about local food written by Barbara Kingsolver
- Films
  - The Future of Food (2004) – a documentary film about genetically engineered foods
  - Food Matters (2008) – a documentary film about nutritional science
  - Taste the Waste (2010) – a documentary film about food waste written and directed by Valentin Thurn
  - A Place at the Table (2012) – a documentary film about hunger in the United States
  - What the Health (2017) – a documentary film that advocates a plant-based diet
