= This Is Your Mind On Plants =

2021 book by Michael Pollan

- Author: Michael Pollan
- Language: English
- Subject: Psychoactive drugs
- Genre: Essay
- Publisher: The Penguin Press
- Publication date: 2021
- Media type: Print
- Pages: 278
- ISBN: 978-0-59329-690-5
- OCLC: 1240828880
- Dewey Decimal: 581.6

This Is Your Mind On Plants is a 2021 book by Michael Pollan. It discusses the socio- economic, political, historical, and cultural significance of drugs in society. It examines three drugs in detail: opium, caffeine and mescaline, each of which, he argues, has had a significant impact on the development of society.

Pollan stated that he intended to start a post-"war on drugs" conversation that shifts attitudes away from flat-out prohibition, and towards finding a more mature way to fit drugs into society. He cites this as one of the reasons he included caffeine in the book: to show people who may have otherwise considered themselves as 'non-drug takers' that they may indeed also have an addiction to a plant drug. He also stated that another motivation for the book came from his deep interest in human relationships with plants and how plants use humans for survival and reproduction.

== Contents ==
=== Opium ===
In the opium chapter, Pollan discusses the silent attempts of the Drug Enforcement Administration to mitigate clandestine opium production derived from the poppy species Papaver Somniferum in the late 1990s. This enforcement was triggered in large part by amateur underground counterculture and drug journalist Jim Hogshire publishing Opium For The Masses in 1994, a book which details how to derive opium from Papaver Somniferum. Pollan also discusses the historic importance of opium for medicinal use and trade, and his own experience cultivating opium poppies.

As Pollan documents, it is extremely easy to derive opium from Papaver Somniferum. The seeds of these poppies are also readily available in everyday garden seed catalogues.

Despite the legality of the seeds of Papaver Somniferum, it is illegal to grow the poppy, as it is considered the manufacture of narcotics. Somniferum is the only poppy species mentioned in the Controlled Substances Act of 1970, listing it as Schedule II, the same as cocaine. This means every part of the plant, not just the opium rich bud, is contraband. The seeds are specifically exempt from the law due to their culinary use.

However, as Pollan documents, buying and growing Somniferum was rarely legally consequential unless done with the intent to produce opium; however, growing Somniferum without the intent to produce opium but still with the knowledge that it is even possible may make an individual more guilty and likely to face consequences in the eyes of the DEA. The matter appears to fall within a legal grey area.

Pollan concluded that the Drug Enforcement Administration was attempting to quietly shut down supplies of Papaver Somniferum poppy seeds by urging garden companies not to sell them, without calling attention to the wider public that they were both easily available and easily turned into opium.

There isn't much documented evidence regarding whether or not the DEA still targets poppy suppliers; however, Papaver Somniferum seeds are still very widely available from US gardening companies.

Pollan also discusses the legal circumstances and controversies surrounding the arrest of Opium For The Masses author Jim Hogshire in the 1990s.

=== Caffeine ===
In the caffeine chapter, Pollan discusses the historical importance of caffeine to sociatal productivity. He mentions how it contributed to the development of science and tecnhology in the Arab world, as well as how coffee houses in Europe contribued to the heightened disemenation of enlightened ideas; such as the politics of revolution, referring to the mob that stormed the Bastille in the 1789 French Revolution having had assembled in the Café Desmoulins coffee house and roused to action shortly before.

He also discusses how caffeine played a big role in the rise of capitalism, with the cognitive enhancement it provides helping workers do their jobs much more effectively- a stark contrast to the cognitive impairment the widespread use of alcohol used to provide. He points to the development of the coffee break in the mid 20th century as evidence of this.

As with Opium, Caffeine plays a huge role in trade, and the caffeine trade has historically been tied to incredible exploitation and colonial oppression, such as with the British East India Company's involvement in the tea trade in China in the 19th century. As Pollan describes, whilst coffee is no longer grown by African slaves or Chinese opium addicts, economic exploitation is still present in the coffee and tea trade. Of the couple of dollars you spend on a cup of coffee, the farmer who grew the beans only receives a couple of pennies.

One large part of this chapter also involves Pollan purposefully abstaining from caffeine and documenting his experience with withdrawals. His resulting struggle with the withdrawal symptoms, something he describes as one of the hardest things he's ever done, makes him reflect upon the role caffeine plays in his, and our, everyday lives. As he points out, he didn't feel himself without caffeine; therefore, baseline consciousness for him, and for many people, is caffeinated.

Pollan argues that we should think more carefully about the power caffeine has over our lives. Caffeine use can have many implications, both good and bad. Caffeine, especially when consumed in high quantities or later in the day, negatively impacts sleep quality substantially due to it blocking the binding of adenosine to receptors in the brain. Caffeine also has positive implications for cognitive and physical enhancement if used correctly, and is an ergogenic and nootropic.

Many of the sleep experts Pollan talks to in the book do not use caffeine and recommend avoiding it entirely because it can disrupt sleep significantly.

=== Mescaline ===
Mescaline is a naturally occurring psychedelic alkaloid, found famously in the Peyote and San Pedro cacti species. Its effects are mainly contributed to its binding of the serotonin 5-HT2A/2C receptor agonist; however, mescaline also binds in similar quantities to the 5-HT1A and α2A receptors.

In this chapter, Pollan discusses how the Native American ceremonial use of mescaline- containing peyote cactus played a huge role in keeping their culture alive during the US government's attempts to systemically eradicate it in the late 19th century.

The development of the Native American Church, for which Mescaline is a sacrament, protected Native American culture from the efforts of the US government to destroy it, as they were protected by the First Amendment's right to the free exercise of religion.

Pollan also discusses the historical and political circumstances surrounding how Native American peyote use became widespread, and the key figures involved in fighting for their rights to survive and use Peyote, such as the famous native American Quanah Parker.

At the end of the Chapter, Pollan attends a Mescaline ceremony with his wife, Judith. During the ceremony, Judith reports feeling 'emptied and cleansed' by the experience, after feeling initial intense discomfort.

Pollan's report for the Mescaline experience was primarily positive. Pollan discusses 'visiting' people in his life, both alive and gone, as well as feeling as though personal issues he had planned on resolving were passing his field of awareness and being cathartically 'released', and the anxiety they were causing forgotten. After being encouraged to practice forgiveness and gratitude by the ceremony leader, Talmona, Pollan reports summoning those closest to him and offering his forgiveness to them. Afterwards, Pollan reported feeling intense gratitude for having these people in his life, as if despair was no longer an option.

Peyote cactus grows primarily in Texas in small amounts. The cactus is illegal to grow, possess, or consume except for native americans, who have had the right to do so since U.S. President Clinton signed the American Indian Religious Freedom Act Amendments in 1994. San Pedro cactus is native to the Andes, and is legal to grow. It is less known for containing mescaline, and instead is popularly grown in California as an ornamental.

== Reception ==
Pollan featured on numerous podcasts to promote the book, including The Joe Rogan Experience and The Tim Ferriss Show.

The Financial Times says that whilst the book briefly touches on the pharmacology and toxicology of these drugs, it primarily discusses the relationships between these plant drugs and the humans that consume them, talking in a non-judgmental and objective way, and seeking to dispel the ignorance and demonisation that often surrounds these drugs. They describe Pollan as focusing on these drugs' status within society from an economic, legal, sociological, and anthropological angle.

Tim Adams, writing in The Guardian, describes the book as a "fascinating insight into our relationship mind-altering plants", blending personal use and historical cultural discussion.

Rob Dunn, of The New York Times, says that Pollan "masterfully elevates a series of big questions about drugs, plants and humans that are likely to leave readers thinking in new ways".
