= You Are Going to Prison =

Book by Jim Hogshire

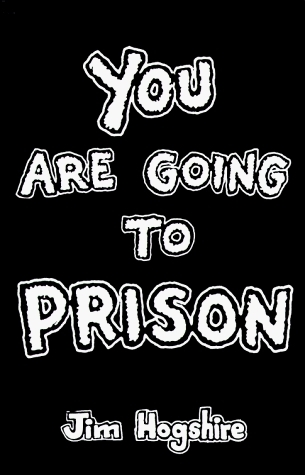
- Author: Jim Hogshire
- Language: English
- Genre: Non-fiction
- Publisher: Loompanics Unlimited
- Publication date: 1994
- ISBN: 1-55950-119-7

You Are Going to Prison is a non-fiction book by Jim Hogshire. It is a practical survival guide for those who are facing their first experience with incarceration. It was loosely adapted into the 2006 comedy film Let's Go to Prison.

== Reception ==
Commending the book for "affording the potential convict a somewhat more realistic appraisal of the dangers of prison life and workable responses to them", Booklist argued in 1994 that "Hogshire has filled a totally empty niche in the reference ecology". By 2006, Entertainment Weekly referred to You Are Going to Prison as "Jim Hogshire's classic underground tome".

== Publication ==
- Loompanics Unlimited, 1994 (ISBN 1-55950-119-7)
- Breakout Productions, 1999 (ISBN 1-893626-22-9)
