= A Place of My Own =

Book by Michael Pollan

- 1998 edition
- Author: Michael Pollan
- Language: English
- Publisher: The Penguin Press
- Publication date: 1997, 2008
- Media type: Print
- Pages: 320
- ISBN: 0143114743
- Preceded by: Second Nature (book)
- Followed by: The Botany of Desire

A Place of My Own: The Education of an Amateur Builder was Michael Pollan's second book, after Second Nature: A Gardener's Education (1991). In 2008, it was re-released and re-titled as A Place of My Own: The Architecture of Daydreams.

The book begins by outlining how Pollan reached the decision to build a "writer's house" himself. The second chapter covers the site selection process. The next chapter follows the design process, including references to Christopher Alexander's A Pattern Language. The following four chapters deal with the construction process. The final chapter covers the finishing work and moving in.

The book is not a how-to book for first-time builders. It is a general overview of the building process, the experiences involved, and the motivations of the author.
