= Michael Pollan =

American author and journalist (born 1955)

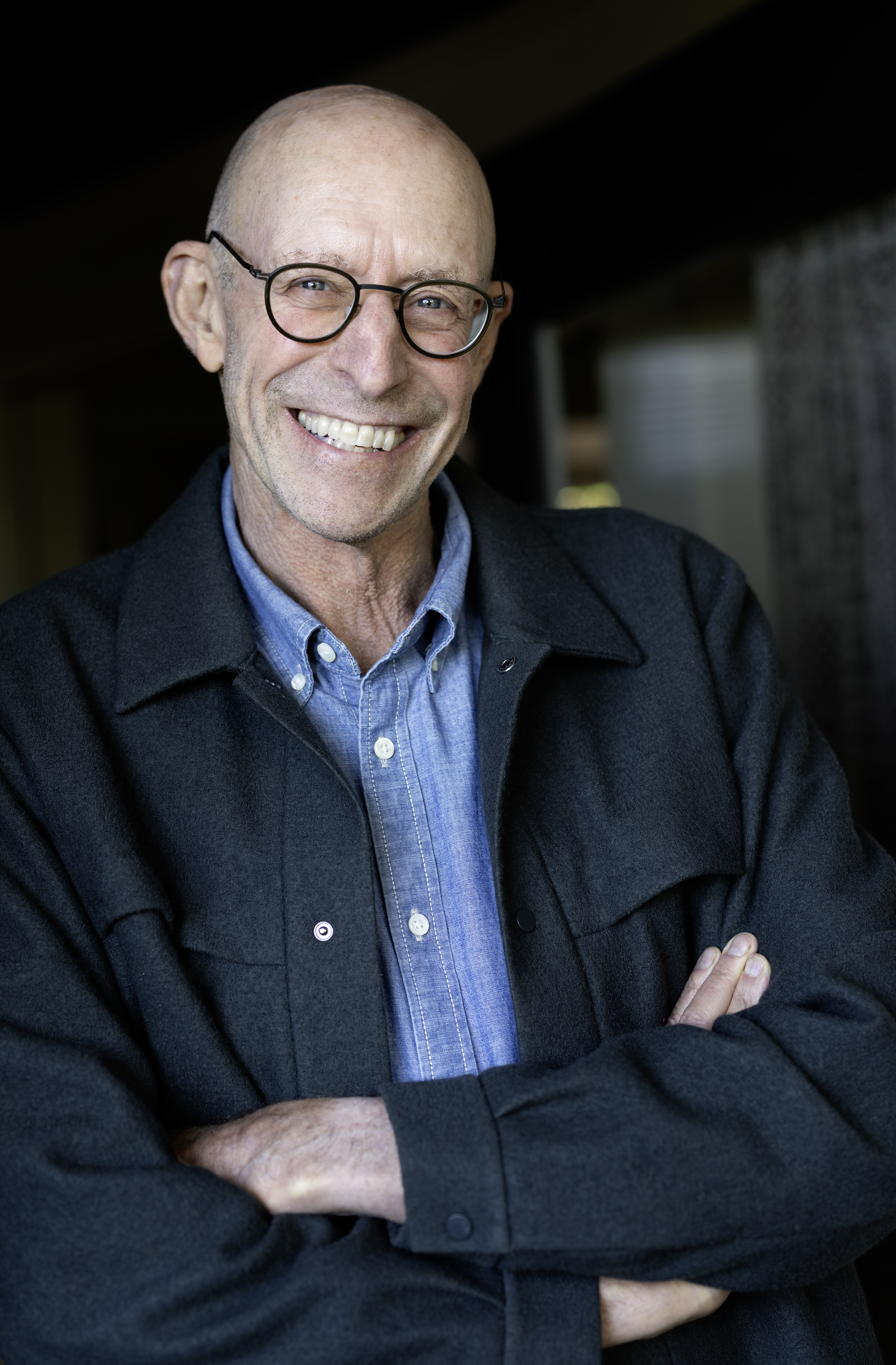
- Pollan in 2025
- Born: Michael Kevin Pollan; February 6, 1955 (age 71); Long Island, New York, U.S.
- Education: Mansfield College, Oxford; Bennington College (BA); Columbia University (MA)
- Occupations: Author; journalist; professor
- Spouse: Judith Belzer
- Family: Tracy Pollan (sister); Michael J. Fox (brother-in-law)
- Website: michaelpollan.com

Michael Kevin Pollan (/ˈpɒlən/; born February 6, 1955) is an American journalist, specializing in food, who is a professor and the first Lewis K. Chan Arts Lecturer at Harvard University. Concurrently, he is the Knight Professor of Science and Environmental Journalism and the director of the Knight Program in Science and Environmental Journalism at the UC Berkeley Graduate School of Journalism, where in 2020 he cofounded the UC Berkeley Center for the Science of Psychedelics, in which he leads the public-education program.

Pollan is best known for his books that explore the sociocultural effects of food, such as The Botany of Desire (2001) and The Omnivore's Dilemma (2006), as well as books that explore the effect of drugs on society and consciousness, such as How to Change Your Mind (2018) and This Is Your Mind On Plants (2021).

The popularity of his books has led to widespread awareness about various parts of the food system, including the local food movement, understanding the connections between climate change and food, and problems with industrial food. Recent books have made Pollan a popular part of the modern education around psychedelics and other mind-altering foods and plants.

His 2018 book How to Change Your Mind, in particular, is considered a cultural turning point for how it contributed to the revival of positive and accepting attitudes toward the potential benefits of psychedelics.

== Early life and education ==
Michael Pollan was born to a Jewish family on Long Island, New York. He is the son of author and financial consultant Stephen Pollan and columnist Corky Pollan. His sister is actress Tracy Pollan.

After studying at Mansfield College, Oxford, through 1975, Pollan received a B.A. in English from Bennington College in 1977 and an M.A. in English from Columbia University in 1981.

== Career ==
=== The Botany of Desire ===
In The Botany of Desire, Pollan explores the concept of co-evolution, specifically of humankind's evolutionary relationship with four plants—apples, tulips, cannabis, and potatoes—from the dual perspectives of humans and the plants. He uses case examples that fit the archetype of four basic human desires, demonstrating how each of these botanical species are selectively grown, bred, and genetically engineered. The apple reflects the desire for sweetness, the tulip for beauty, marijuana for intoxication, and the potato for control.

Throughout the book, Pollan explores the narrative of his own experience with each of the plants, which he then intertwines with a well-researched exploration into their social history. Each section presents a unique element of human domestication, or the "human bumblebee" as Pollan calls it. These range from the true story of Johnny Appleseed to Pollan's first-hand research with sophisticated marijuana hybrids in Amsterdam, to the alarming and paradigm-shifting possibilities of genetically engineered potatoes. Pollan is critical of industrial monoculture claiming it leads to crops less able to defend themselves against herbivores and requiring large amounts of pesticides and fertilizers which upsets the natural ecosystem.

=== The Omnivore's Dilemma ===
In The Omnivore's Dilemma, Pollan describes four basic ways that human societies have obtained food: the current industrial system, the big organic operation, the local self-sufficient farm, and the hunter-gatherer. Pollan follows each of these processes—from a group of plants photosynthesizing calories through a series of intermediate stages, ultimately into a meal. Along the way, he suggests that there is a fundamental tension between the logic of nature and the logic of human industry, that the way we eat represents our most profound engagement with the natural world, and that industrial eating obscures crucially important ecological relationships and connections. On December 10, 2006, The New York Times named The Omnivore's Dilemma one of the five best nonfiction books of the year. On May 8, 2007, the James Beard Foundation named The Omnivore's Dilemma its 2007 winner for the best food writing. It was the book of focus for the University of Pennsylvania's Reading Project in 2007, and the book of choice for Washington State University's Common Reading Program in 2009–10.

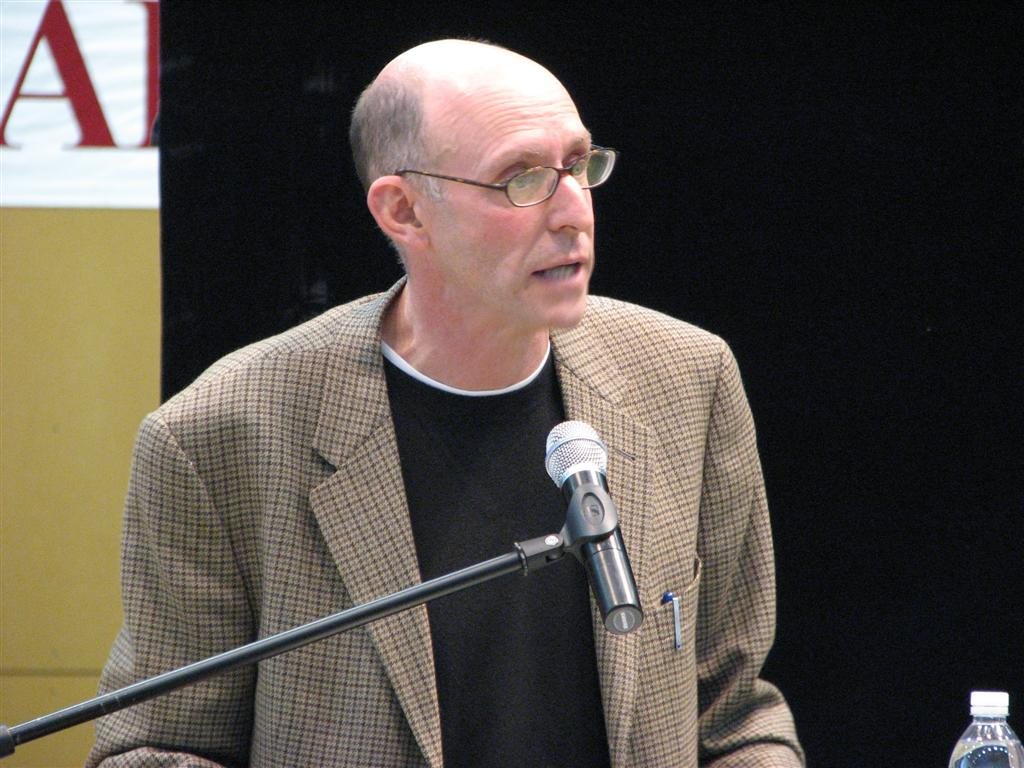
Michael Pollan speaks to the Marin Academy community.

Pollan's discussion of the industrial food chain is in large part a critique of modern agribusiness. According to the book, agribusiness has lost touch with the natural cycles of farming, wherein livestock and crops intertwine in mutually beneficial circles. Pollan's critique of modern agribusiness focuses on what he describes as the overuse of corn for purposes ranging from fattening cattle to massive production of corn oil, high-fructose corn syrup, and other corn derivatives. He describes what he sees as the inefficiencies and other drawbacks of factory farming and gives his assessment of organic food production and what it is like to hunt and gather food. He blames those who set the rules (e.g., politicians in Washington, D.C., bureaucrats at the United States Department of Agriculture, Wall Street capitalists, and agricultural conglomerates like Archer Daniels Midland) of what he calls a destructive and precarious agricultural system that has wrought havoc upon the diet, nutrition, and well-being of Americans. Pollan finds hope in Joel Salatin's Polyface Farm in Virginia, which he sees as a model of sustainability in commercial farming. Pollan appears in the documentary film King Corn (2007).

=== In Defense of Food: An Eater's Manifesto ===
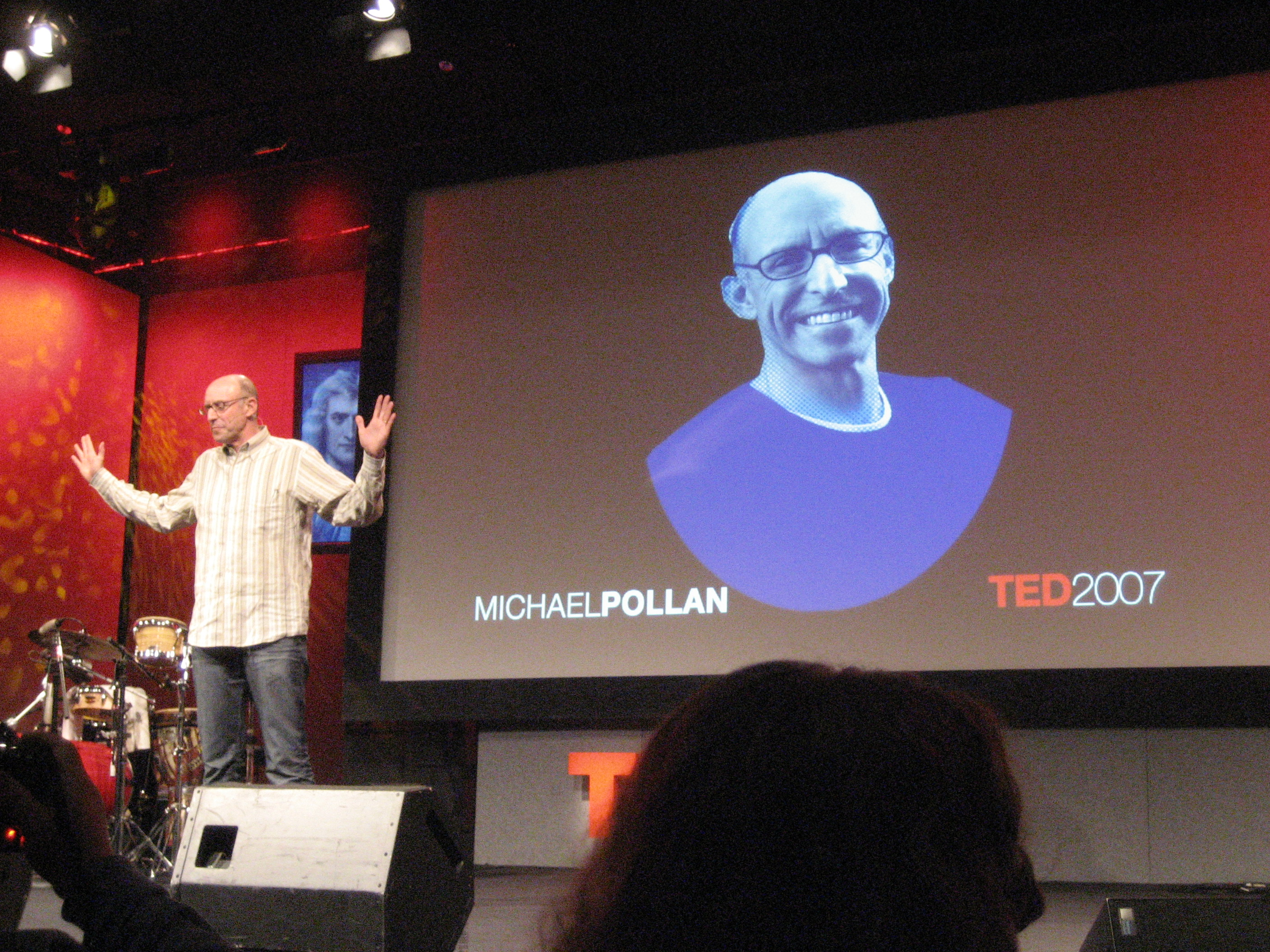
Pollan speaking at TED in 2007

Pollan's book In Defense of Food: An Eater's Manifesto, released on January 1, 2008, explores the relationship with what he terms nutritionism and the Western diet, with a focus on late 20th century food advice given by the science community. Pollan holds that consumption of fat and dietary cholesterol does not lead to a higher rate of coronary disease, and that the reductive analysis of food into nutrient components is a mistake.

Throughout the book, Pollan questions the view that the point of eating is to promote health, pointing out that this attitude is not universal and that cultures that perceive food as having purposes of pleasure, identity, and sociality may end up with better health. He explains this seeming paradox by vetting, and then validating, the notion that nutritionism and, therefore, the whole Western framework through which we intellectualize the value of food is more a religious and faddish devotion to the mythology of simple solutions than a convincing and reliable conclusion of incontrovertible scientific research.

Pollan spends the rest of his book explicating his first three phrases: "Eat food. Not too much. Mostly plants." He contends that most of what Americans now buy in supermarkets, fast food stores, and restaurants is not in fact food, and that a practical tip is to eat only those things that people of his grandmother's generation would have recognized as food.

=== Food Rules: An Eater's Manual ===
In 2009, Food Rules: An Eater's Manual was published. This short work is a condensed version of his previous efforts, intended to provide a simple framework for a healthy and sustainable diet. It is divided into three sections, further explicating Pollan's principles of "Eat food. Not too much. Mostly plants." It includes his rules (i.e., "let others sample your food" and "the whiter the bread, the sooner you'll be dead").

=== Cooked: A Natural History of Transformation ===
In Cooked: A Natural History of Transformation, published in 2013, Pollan explores the methods by which cooks mediate "between nature and culture." The book is organized into four sections corresponding to the classical elements of Fire (cooking with heat), Water (braising and boiling with pots), Air (breadmaking), and Earth (fermenting). The book also features Samin Nosrat, who later became known for the bestselling cookbook Salt, Fat, Acid, Heat, and as "the chef who taught Michael Pollan how to cook." A 2016 Netflix documentary series created by Alex Gibney is based on the book, starring Michael Pollan and Isaac Pollan.

=== How to Change Your Mind ===
In 2018, Pollan wrote How to Change Your Mind: What the New Science of Psychedelics Teaches Us About Consciousness, Dying, Addiction, Depression, and Transcendence, a book about the history and future of psychedelic drugs. The book became a No. 1 New York Times best-seller. He argues that psilocybin and LSD are not drugs that make people crazy, which he calls the biggest misconception people have about psychedelics, but rather drugs that can help a person become "more sane" by, for example, eliminating a fear of death. While promoting his book on TV, he explained that along with LSD and psilocybin, his research included ingesting ayahuasca and 5-MeO-DMT, and that he experienced a dissolution of ego. Based on his 2018 book Pollan leads the way in the Netflix docuseries How to Change Your Mind exploring the history and uses of psychedelics, including LSD, psilocybin, MDMA and mescaline.

=== This Is Your Mind on Plants ===
His book This Is Your Mind on Plants was released on July 6, 2021, and explores in particular opium, caffeine, and mescaline. Pollan is trying to start a post war on drugs conversation that better takes into account how different one drug is from another and figures out cultural containers for each of them, to use them safely and productively. The book ends with a ceremony around the use of San Pedro (Echinopsis pachanoi), a relatively fast growing Andean cactus that contains mescaline.

=== A World Appears ===
In A World Appears: A Journey into Consciousness, published in 2026, Pollan explores consciousness from scientific, philosophical, literary, spiritual and psychedelic perspectives, ranging from plant sentience to synthetic consciousness.

=== Other work ===
Pollan is a contributing writer for the New York Times Magazine and a former executive editor for Harper's Magazine. His first book, Second Nature: A Gardener's Education, was published in 1991.

Pollan has contributed to Greater Good, a social psychology magazine published by the Greater Good Science Center at the University of California, Berkeley. His article "Edible Ethics" discusses the intersection of ethical eating and social psychology.

In his 1998 book A Place of My Own: The Education of an Amateur Builder, Pollan methodically traced the design and construction of the out-building where he writes. The 2008 re-release of this book was re-titled A Place of My Own: The Architecture of Daydreams.

Pollan wrote and narrated an audiobook, Caffeine: How Caffeine Created the Modern World, for Audible.com

In 2014, Pollan wrote the foreword in the healthy eating cookbook The Pollan Family Table. The book is co-authored by his mother, Corky Pollan, and sisters, Lori Pollan, Dana Pollan, and Tracy Pollan.

Pollan also co-starred in the documentary, Food, Inc. (2008), for which he was also a consultant. In 2010 Pollan was interviewed for the film Queen of the Sun: What are the bees telling us?, a feature-length documentary about honey bees and colony collapse disorder. He was also interviewed for Vanishing of the Bees, a documentary also about colony collapse, directed by Maryam Henein and George Langworthy. In 2015, a documentary version of Pollan's book In Defense of Food premiered on PBS. In 2016, Netflix released a four-part documentary series, which was based on Pollan's book, Cooked (2013), and was directed by Alex Gibney.

Starting November 2022, he teaches an online subscription MasterClass course on Intentional Eating.

== Recognition ==
In 2015, Pollan received the Washburn Award from the Boston Museum of Science, awarded annually to "an individual who has made an outstanding contribution toward public understanding and appreciation of science and the vital role it plays in our lives" and was named as a fellow at the Radcliffe Institute for Advanced Study at Harvard University.

In 2016, Pollan received an honorary degree from the University of Gastronomic Sciences

He has also won the James Beard Leadership award, the Reuters World Conservation Union Global Awards in environmental journalism, the James Beard Foundation Awards for best magazine series in 2003, and the Genesis Award from the Humane Society of the United States. His articles have been anthologized in Best American Science Writing (2004), Best American Essays (1990 and 2003), The Animals: Practicing Complexity (2006), and the Norton Book of Nature Writing (1990). In 2008, Pollan received the Washington University International Humanities Medal.

== Criticisms ==
In the American Enterprise Institute's magazine, farmer Blake Hurst argues that Pollan offers a shallow assessment of factory farming that does not take all the financial costs into account (e.g., the cost of collecting and trucking household compost to farms to replace nitrogen fertilizer derived from fossil fuels).

Journalist Daniel Engber criticized Pollan in Slate for arguing that food is too complex a subject to study scientifically and blaming reductionism for today's health ills, while using nutritional research to justify his own diet advice. Engber likened Pollan's "anti-scientific method" to the rhetoric used by health gurus who peddle diet scams.

Pollan's work has also been discussed and criticized by Jonathan Safran Foer in his non-fiction book Eating Animals. Foer criticizes Pollan's argument regarding table-fellowship. According to Foer, Pollan claims that a vegetarian dinner guest causes socially reprimandable inconvenience for the host. Foer responds that in the year 2010 it is easier for hosts to accommodate vegetarians than locavores as hosts will need to do extensive research to find (expensive) non factory-farmed meat.

Pollan has been accused by Jon Entine, who supports GMOs (genetically modified organisms), of using his influence to promote "anti-GMO junk science". A number of scientists and journalists have similarly characterized Pollan's work as biased against GMOs. For example, after Pollan posted a tweet that was critical of a New York Times article on GMOs, U.C. Berkeley biologist Michael Eisen posted a tweet calling Pollan's comment "a new low even in Pollan's 'anti-GMO crusade'". In response to Pollan's statement that GMOs have been one "tremendous disappointment," food writer James Cooper criticized Pollan's tendency to cite poor or selected scientific sources. Relatedly, in 2013, Pollan in a speech to the Royal Society of Arts erroneously stated that McDonald's fries were made with potatoes contaminated with methamidophos, a pesticides that is not in use in the US for several years at the point of his speech. He also incorrectly stated that harvested potatoes are inedible for 6 months unless they are "off-gassed" of toxic contaminates.

In 2014, Pollan co-hosted a discussion and informal debate on the topic of genetic modification at UC Berkeley featuring prominent plant geneticist Pamela Ronald, professor at UC Davis, whose research-based position "strongly disagrees with Pollan's view that G.M.O. crops, broadly, are failing." A New Yorker reporter observed that Pollan's largely anti-GMO student base at the discussion itself constituted, "a kind of monoculture," yet that Pollan sought "to introduce an invasive species" by engaging Ronald. The event, while predictably contentious, reportedly produced a rare instance of courteous, productive exchange between the two main sharply-opposed viewpoints on genetically modified crops.

Michael Pollan has supported the practice of drinking raw milk, and various other "real food" beliefs associated with the 2024 MAHA movement. Similarly, writers like Julie Guthman has criticized Pollan for overemphasizing individual decision making when it comes to eating when discussing food, which requires a more systemic (and by necessity political) approach.

Pollan's 2018 book How to Change Your Mind has been criticized for not addressing unethical behaviors, such as sexual misconduct by psychedelic therapists, despite his professional relationships with figures in the field.

Following his 2019 New York Times op-ed advocating for medical legalization over broader decriminalization, Pollan faced accusations of hypocrisy from psychedelic advocate Duncan Trussell, who highlighted Pollan's own admissions of illegal personal use of psychedelics in the book.

Pollan was criticized for his 2025 article for The New Yorker, "This Is Your Priest on Drugs," which examined a Johns Hopkins University psilocybin study on religious leaders. Critics argued that while Pollan reported JHU's Institutional Review Board finding of "serious non-compliance," he omitted the full ethical findings concerning participant welfare and research integrity violations, presented blocked qualitative data as a "narrative account" supplied by a funder rather than disclosing it as blocked from formal publication, and failed to disclose personal associations with key study figures such as Bob Jesse, a funder and researcher on the study and a long-time collaborator with Pollan at his UC Berkeley psychedelic research center. During a June 2025 panel discussion on the clergy study at the Graduate Theological Union, Pollan defended including the blocked data without explaining the lack of disclosures, calling a study whistleblower a "gadfly."

Pollan has also been criticized for conflicts of interest in his psychedelic journalism following his co-founding of the UC Berkeley Center for the Science of Psychedelics, particularly in relation to the Ferriss–UC Berkeley Psychedelic Journalism Fellowship in partnership with Tim Ferriss. Pollan endorsed this initiative as creating a "cadre" of journalists to cover psychedelics and is listed as the fellowship's faculty member. In a 2021 AMA with Ferriss, Pollan emphasized "public education" to "inoculate the public against the inevitable negative stories—business collapses, sexual abuse in the treatment room, suicides, scandal" in the psychedelics field, an approach of advocacy journalism rather than neutral scientific reporting. A 2025 report, "The Psychedelic Syndicate," by non-profit Psymposia linked the fellowship to the Psychedelic Science Funders Collaborative, a group of wealthy psychedelic philanthropists described as social engineering public opinion on psychedelics.

== Bibliography ==
=== Books ===
- Second nature: a gardener's education. New York: Atlantic Monthly Press. 1991.
- A Place of My Own: The Education of an Amateur Builder. New York: Random House. 1997. ISBN 978-0-679-41532-9.
- The Botany of Desire: A Plant's-Eye View of the World. New York: Random House. 2001. ISBN 978-0-375-50129-6.
- The Omnivore's Dilemma: A Natural History of Four Meals. New York: Penguin Press. 2006. ISBN 978-1-59420-082-3.
- In Defense of Food: An Eater's Manifesto. New York: Penguin Press. 2008. ISBN 978-1-59420-145-5.
- Food Rules: An Eater's Manual. New York: Penguin Press. 2009. ISBN 978-0-14-311638-7.
- Cooked: A Natural History of Transformation. New York: Penguin Press. 2013. ISBN 978-1-59420-421-0.
- Pollan Family Table. New York: Scribner. 2014. ISBN 978-1-476746371. (foreword)
- How to Change Your Mind: What the New Science of Psychedelics Teaches Us About Consciousness, Dying, Addiction, Depression, and Transcendence. New York: Penguin Press. 2018. ISBN 978-1-59420-422-7.
- This Is Your Mind on Plants. New York: Penguin Press. 2021. ISBN 978-0-593-41421-7.
- A World Appears: A Journey Into Consciousness (2026)

=== Critical studies and reviews of Pollan's work ===
The omnivore's dilemma

- Flannery, Tim (June 28, 2007). "We're living on corn!". The New York Review of Books. Vol. 54, no. 11. pp. 26–28. PMID 17595729.

== Filmography ==
- Pollan appeared in the 2008 documentary, Food, Inc., and the 2023 sequel Food, Inc. 2.
- Michael Pollan (2016). Cooked (Television production). United States: Netflix.
- How to Change Your Mind (2022)
