= Food Rules: An Eater's Manual =

2009 book by Michael Pollan

- Author: Michael Pollan
- Language: English
- Publisher: Penguin Press
- Publication date: December 29, 2009
- Publication place: United States
- Media type: Paperback
- Pages: 112
- ISBN: 978-0-14-311638-7
- Preceded by: In Defense of Food
- Followed by: Cooked: A Natural History of Transformation

Food Rules: An Eater's Manual is a 2009 book by Michael Pollan. It offers 64 rules on eating based on his previous book In Defense of Food in three sections: Eat food, mostly plants, not too much. (Apples are, by his definition, "food", while Twinkies are not, and ice cream is near the line.) The book attributes the "diseases of affluence", to the so-called "Western Diet" of processed meats and food products, and offers its rules as a remedy to the problem.
