= The Omnivore's Dilemma =

2006 book by Michael Pollan

- Author: Michael Pollan
- Language: English
- Subject: Food production
- Genre: Essay
- Publisher: The Penguin Press
- Publication date: 2006
- Media type: Print
- Pages: 450
- ISBN: 978-1-59420-082-3
- OCLC: 62290639
- Dewey Decimal: 394.1/2 22
- LC Class: GT2850 .P65 2006
- Preceded by: The Botany of Desire
- Followed by: In Defense of Food

The Omnivore's Dilemma: A Natural History of Four Meals is a nonfiction book written by American author Michael Pollan published in 2006. As omnivores, humans have a variety of food choices. In the book, Pollan investigates the environmental and animal welfare effects of various food choices. He suggests that, prior to modern food preservation and transportation technologies, the dilemmas caused by these options were resolved primarily by cultural influences.

Technology has made previously seasonal or regional foods available year-round and in all regions. Culture, which once moderated the relationship between food and society, has now created confusion. To teach more about those choices, Pollan describes various food chains that end in human food: industrial food, organic food, and food we forage ourselves, from the source to a final meal, and in the process writes a critique of the American method of eating.

== Contents ==
Michael Pollan informs us about how corn, the U.S.'s main food source, is "taking over the world" due to its pervasiveness in many of the foods we eat, including beverages made with cornstarch and meat and dairy products from animals fed with corn. Pollan hopes that his book will change the diets in the U.S. of both humans and animals. In the first section, he monitors the development of a calf from a pasture in South Dakota, through its stay on a Kansas feedlot, to its end. The author says that corn is the worst thing for feedlot cows to eat because it hurts their livers. The industry accepts the fact that corn-fed cows naturally become sick as a cost of doing business.

In the second section, Pollan describes the large-scale farms and food-processing facilities that largely satisfy surging demand for organic food, using Whole Foods as a proxy. The author intends to demonstrate that, despite the group's rhetoric, the virtues advertised are often questionable. For example, an operation raising "free-range" chicken has only a tiny yard available, largely unused by the short-lived birds. Pollan also accuses large-scale organic agriculture of "floating on a sinking sea of petroleum" by analyzing that a one-pound box of California-produced organic lettuce—that contains 80 food calories—requires 4,600 calories of fossil fuel to process and ship to the East Coast. He adds that the quantity would be only "about 4 percent higher if the salad were grown conventionally."

One of Pollan's main points about the organic farming industry is that it gives people the wrong idea that organic products must come from beautiful open fields.

In contrast to his discussion of the large-scale organic food industry, Pollan presents in the third section Joel Salatin, a farmer who manages a successful mid-sized, multi-species meat farm in Virginia and insists on selling his goods nearby and relies on his family and a few interns to supplement his labor. Pollan discusses how each part of the farm directly helps the others—the sun feeds the grass, the grass feeds the cows, the larvae in the cow manure feed the chickens, and the chickens feed the grass with nitrogen. Due to the various cyclical processes on the farm, it does not require fossil fuels.

The final section finds Pollan attempting to prepare a meal using only ingredients he has hunted, gathered, or grown himself. He recruits assistance from local foodies, who teach him to hunt feral pigs, gather wild mushrooms, and search for abalone. He also makes a salad of greens from his garden, bakes sourdough bread using wild yeast, and prepares a dessert from cherries picked in his neighborhood.

Pollan concludes that the fast food meal and the hunter-gatherer meal are "equally unreal and equally unsustainable." He believes that if we were once again aware of the source of our food – what it was, where it came from, how it traveled to reach us, and its true cost – we would see that we "eat by the grace of nature, not industry."

=== On veganism ===
Pollan argues that to "give up" human consumption of animals would result in a "food chain ... even more dependent than it already is on fossil fuels and chemical fertilizers since food would need to travel even farther and fertility – in the form of manures – would be in short supply." This is because, according to Pollan, in some grassy areas, growing grains or other plant foods is not a viable alternative to raising ruminants for human consumption.

== Reception ==
Economist Tyler Cowen argued, "The problems with Pollan's 'self-financed' meal reflect the major shortcoming of the book: He focuses on what is before his eyes but neglects the macro perspective of the economist. He wants to make the costs of various foods transparent, but this is an unattainable ideal, given the interconnectedness of markets."

Washington State University, situated in an agricultural area of Washington state, chose this book to be part of its freshman reading program in 2009 but soon canceled the program. Many in the university's community, including those who manage the kinds of industrial farms The Omnivore's Dilemma discusses, were unhappy with the selection, and there was speculation that the cancellation was a result of political influence. Elson Floyd, president of WSU, stated instead that it was a budgetary issue, and when food safety expert William Marler offered to pay the claimed shortfall, the program was reinstated, and Pollan was invited to speak on campus.

== Honors ==
The New York Times named The Omnivore's Dilemma one of the ten best books of 2006, Additionally, Pollan received a James Beard Award for the work.

The book has also been published in a young reader's edition, and it is being used in cross-curricular lessons by teachers interested in promoting its message.

== See also ==
- Animal, Vegetable, Miracle (2007)
- Environmental effects of meat production
- Food, Inc. (2008) documentary film
- Land Institute
