= Them: A Novel =

2007 novel by Nathan McCall

- First edition
- Author: Nathan McCall
- Language: English
- Genre: Fiction
- Published: 2007 (Atria)
- Publication place: United States
- Media type: Print
- Pages: 340

Them: A Novel is a 2007 debut fictional novel by Nathan McCall.

== Overview ==
Barlowe Reed, an African American in his forties, buys a home in Atlanta's Old Fourth Ward, and must come to grips with new white neighbors and rampant gentrification.
