= Us and Them =

Us and them is a term used in the sociological concept of in-group and out-group.

Us and Them may also refer to:

== Film, stage, and television ==
- Us and Them (film), a 2018 Chinese drama film
- Us & Them (American TV series)
- Us and Them (Australian TV series), a 1994 Australian comedy television series
- Us and Them, a one-act play by David Campton

== Music ==
- Us and Them (Shinedown album), 2005
- Us and Them (Godflesh album), 1999
- Us and Them: Symphonic Pink Floyd, a Pink Floyd tribute album
- "Us and Them" (song), by Pink Floyd
- Us + Them Tour, a concert tour by Roger Waters
- Roger Waters: Us + Them, a concert film and live album from the previous tour

== See also ==
- "Them and Us" (Bad Girls), a 1999 television episode
- Us vs. Them (disambiguation)
