= Makes Me Wanna Holler =

1994 book by Nathan McCall

Makes Me Wanna Holler: A Young Black Man in America
- Softcover edition
- Author: Nathan McCall
- Language: English
- Genre: Autobiographical
- Published: 1994
- Publisher: Random House
- Publication place: United States
- Media type: Print
- Pages: 404 pp

Makes Me Wanna Holler: A Young Black Man in America (1994) is an autobiographical and debut book by Nathan McCall.

In an April 2014 interview with Ebony magazine, Nathan McCall stated that he was amazed that Makes Me Wanna Holler was still selling 20 years after it was originally published.
