= Intervale (Augusta County, Virginia) =

Historic house in Virginia, United States

- U.S. National Register of Historic Places
- Virginia Landmarks Register
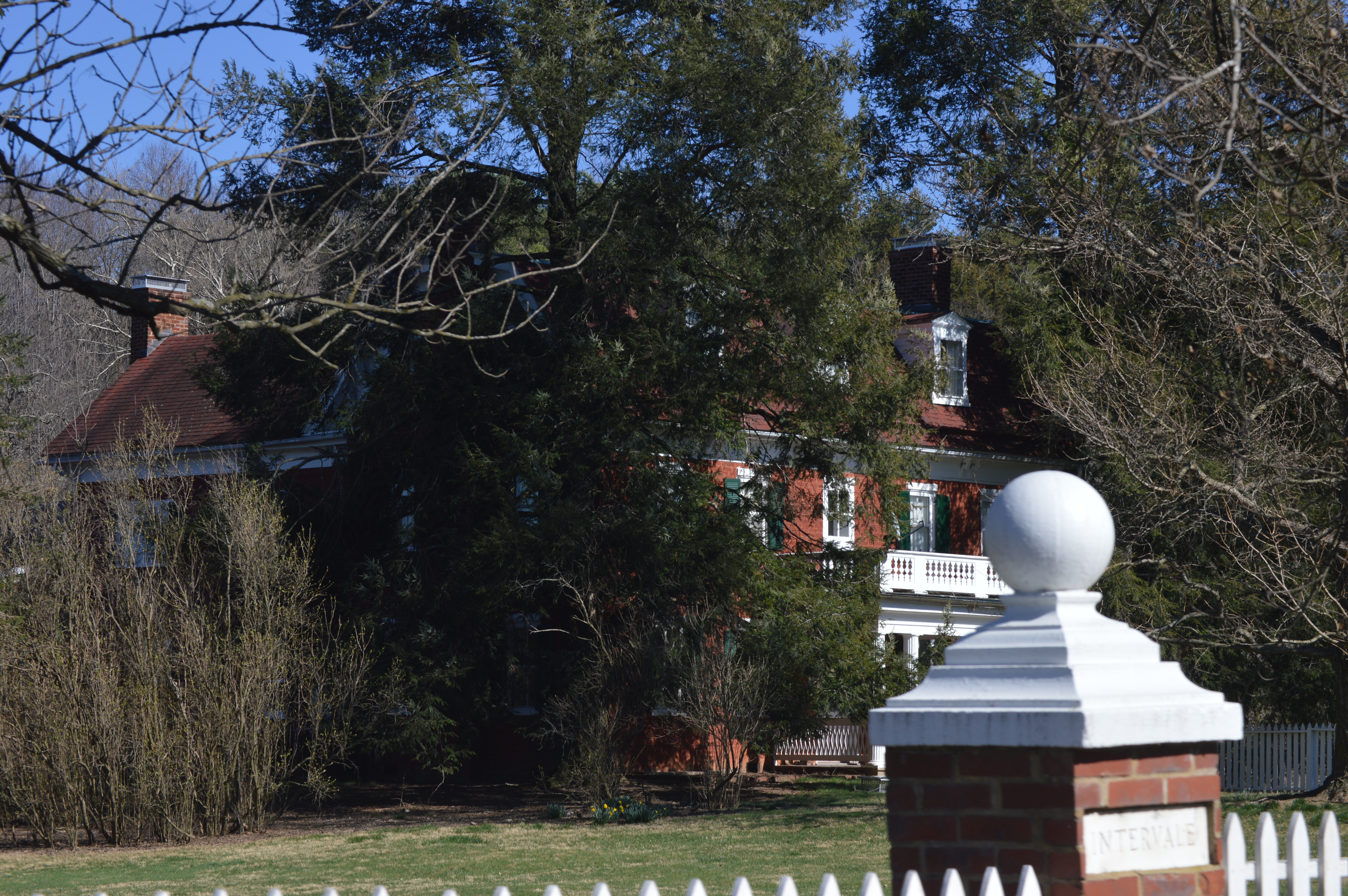
- View from the east

- Location within Virginia Location within the United States
- Location: Morris Mill Road, Swoope, Virginia
- Coordinates: 38°11′51″N 79°11′21″W
- Area: 3 acres (1.2 ha)
- Built: 1819, c. 1885
- Built by: Christian Bear
- Architectural style: Colonial Revival
- NRHP reference No.: 85000296
- VLR No.: 007-0018

Significant dates
- Added to NRHP: February 14, 1985
- Designated VLR: December 11, 1984

Intervale is a historic home located at Swoope, Augusta County, Virginia. The house was built about 1819, and remodeled and enlarged in the 1880s. It is a two-story, five bay brick I-house plan dwelling in the Colonial Revival style. It has an original one-story brick ell. The interior woodwork reflects German folk art design. Also on the property are the contributing log bank barn and a two-level spring house.

It was listed on the National Register of Historic Places in 1985.
