= Nathan McCall =

American journalist

- Born: 1955 (age 70–71); Portsmouth, Virginia, U.S.
- Education: Norfolk State University
- Occupations: Author, lecturer

Nathan McCall (born November 25, 1954) is an American author and journalist. He has written in the genres of novel, memoir, biography, and social commentary, often focusing on the African-American experience.

== Biography ==
As the stepson of a Navy man, McCall grew up in various locations, such as Morocco, Norfolk, Virginia and the Cavalier Manor section of Portsmouth, Virginia. After serving three years in prison, he studied journalism at Norfolk State University. He reported for The Virginian Pilot-Ledger Star and The Atlanta Journal-Constitution before moving to The Washington Post In 1989.

In his first book, Makes Me Wanna Holler, McCall provides a detailed story of his life of violence and street crime, as well as the hardships he experienced growing up with racial profiling, class differences and peer pressure. He describes, in graphic detail, gang-rapes and violent assaults he participated in during his youth.

His second book, What's Going On, used personal essays to discuss some larger issues such as social, cultural, and political tensions that affect the modern day United States.

After the success of his books, McCall was in demand as a speaker. He left The Washington Post for the lecture circuit. Today he continues to write, and holds the post of lecturer in the Department of African-American Studies at Emory University in Atlanta, Georgia.

His first novel Them: A Novel, dealing with issues of gentrification in an Atlanta neighborhood, was published in 2007. Them tells the story of Barlowe Reed, a single, forty-something African-American man, who has to come to terms with the gentrification of his neighborhood, in particular the influx of white people to the area.

In an April 2014 interview with Ebony magazine, McCall stated that he was amazed that Makes Me Wanna Holler was still selling after 20 years.
