= Food Rules! =

2001 book by Bill Haduch

Food Rules! The Stuff You Munch, Its Crunch, Its Punch, and Why You Sometimes Lose Your Lunch
- Author: Bill Haduch
- Illustrator: Rick Stromoski
- Language: English
- Genre: Children's
- Publisher: Dutton Children's Books
- Publication date: 2001
- Publication place: United States
- Media type: Paperback
- Pages: 112
- ISBN: 978-0-525-46419-8

Food Rules! The Stuff You Munch, Its Crunch, Its Punch, and Why You Sometimes Lose Your Lunch is a children's literature book written by Bill Haduch and illustrated by Rick Stromoski. It was published in 2001 by Dutton Children's Books. It explains food and nutrition at the middle-school level, and was named to Booklist's Top Ten Youth Science Books of 2001.

== Summary ==
Food Rules! is a comprehensive resource on nutrition catering to young readers. The book covers a broad array of subjects related to food such as the nutritional value of food, how digestion works, identification of harmful substances, understanding portion sizes, the diversity of flavors, and insights into the causes of food-related ailments. The book conveys scientific information through comedic illustrations and diagrams. It also offers various recipes and nutrition tips.

== Relevance ==
The book's emergence coincided with a societal shift, marked by increasing concerns about the nutritional quality of children's diets. During the late 1990s and early 2000s, public education of children's nutrition lacked comprehensive and accessible resources. Information available to young audiences often either oversimplified important concepts or lacked depth in coverage, and most Americans were not ingesting sufficient amounts of nutritious foods.

At its release, the book addressed a critical need for children to access resources offering digestible explanations of abstract concepts like nutrition. The book's level of detail and explanation of healthy eating habits was significant, as researchers began to correlate informed childhood dietary choices with better academic performance.

With a rise in processed food consumption and sedentary lifestyles, there was a growing need to educate children about healthy eating habits and understanding nutritional labels. Food Rules! is an example of children's literature that emerged from an increasing need for educational materials geared towards young audiences.

== Reception ==
Food Rules! has been well received by educators, librarians, and parents. It was named to Booklist's Top Ten Youth Science Books of 2001 in the year of its publication. A description of the book in the School Library Journal lauds Haduch's evocative and entertaining portrayal of nutrition, commenting that memorable descriptions of eating maximize a book's appeal towards young audiences. Similarly, a profile on Publishers Weekly calls the book a "wealth of information" with an ability to "break down complicated ideas, such as amino acids and cholesterol, into easy-to-digest pieces."

== Legacy ==
In the decades since the publication of Food Rules!, scientific and public understanding of children's nutrition have increased significantly. The United States Department of Agriculture introduced in 2011 the MyPlate diagram, a visual breakdown of serving sizes for different food groups, as a tool to bolster understanding of healthy diet habits. The category of children's books on nutrition has also expanded as a whole alongside the social shift towards nutritional awareness. The publication of Food Rules! accompanied the emerging relevance of health and nutrition for children in the early 2000s, and it retains its value as an educational resource.
