= What's Going On (book) =

- Author: Nathan McCall
- Language: English
- Genre: Essays
- Publisher: Random House
- Publication date: 1997
- Publication place: United States
- Media type: Print
- Pages: 192

What's Going On (1997) is a book collection of personal essays by Nathan McCall.
