= Jim Hogshire =

American counterculture writer

- Born: James Frederick Hogshire; 1958 (age 67–68); Indianapolis, Indiana, U.S.
- Education: Indiana University Bloomington
- Occupation: Author
- Writing career
- Pen name: Chet Antonini
- Notable work: You Are Going to Prison

James Frederick Hogshire (born 1958) is an American counterculture author of magazine articles, short stories, and a number of books. His works have been published in such magazines as Harper's, Gentleman's Quarterly, Details, Esquire, CovertAction Quarterly, Omni, FAIR, The Animal's Agenda, and Lies of Our Times.

Hogshire attended Indiana University in Bloomington, Indiana between 1976 and 1980.

Hogshire was a writer for the tabloid National Examiner between 1990 and 1991, and often used the pseudonym "Chet Antonini."

A cover article by Jim Hogshire titled "Animals and Islam" appears in The Animals Agenda, October 1991.

In 1993, one of Hogshire's infamous prank calls, "Bacon and Eggs", was made into a short film starring Linda Blair and Bill Pullman.

One of Hogshire's better known short stories "The Electric Cough-Syrup Acid Test" was excerpted by Harper's and has also appeared in the book White Rabbit, and a book about zines. The story first appeared in Hogshire's zine, Pills-a-Go-Go.

In 2006, a movie adaptation of his non-fiction guide You Are Going to Prison was released by Universal Studios as Let's Go to Prison. The movie stars Dax Shepard and was directed by Bob Odenkirk.

In 2009 Feral House released an updated version of Hoghire's book Opium for the Masses.

As of 2010, he was living in Seattle, Washington.

== Partial bibliography ==
- You Are Going to Prison. Loompanics Unlimited. 1994. ISBN 1559501197
- Opium for the Masses: A Practical Guide to Growing Poppies and Making Opium. Loompanics Unlimited. 1994. ISBN 1559501146. Reprinted by Feral House. 2009. ISBN 978-1-932595-46-8
- Pills-A-Go-Go: Fiendish Investigation into Pill Marketing, Art, History, and Consumption. Feral House. 1999. ISBN 0-922915-53-9
- Sell Yourself to Science: The Complete Guide to Selling Your Organs, Body Fluids, Bodily Functions and Being a Human Guinea Pig. Loompanics Unlimited. 1992. ISBN 1559500840
- Grossed-Out Surgeon Vomits Inside Patient!: An Insider's Look at the Supermarket Tabloids. Feral House. 1997. ISBN 0922915423
