= Jo Robinson (author) =

American author

Jo Robinson (born 1947) is an American author. She primarily writes in the fields of food and nutrition.

Her book Eating on the Wild Side won the 2014 IACP Food Writing Award in the Food Matters category.

== Books ==
- Eating on the Wild Side: The Missing Link to Optimum Health (Little, Brown and Company, 2013)
- Pasture Perfect (Vashon Island Press, 2004)
- When Your Body Gets the Blues: The Clinically Proven Program for Women Who Feel Tired and Stressed and Eat Too Much (with Dr. Marie-Annette Brown) (Rodale Books, 2002)
- Why Grassfed Is Best!: The Surprising Benefits of Grassfed Meats, Eggs, and Dairy Products (Vashon Island Press, 2000)
- The Omega Diet: The Lifesaving Nutritional Program Based on the Best of the Mediterranean Diets (with Dr. Artemis Simopoulos) (Harper, 1997)
- Hot Monogamy and Emotional Incest (with Dr. Pat Love) (Penguin, 1995)
- Unplug the Christmas Machine: A Complete Guide to Putting Love and Joy Back into the Season (with Jean Staeheli) (1991)
