= List of Guggenheim Fellowships awarded in 2014 =

List of Guggenheim Fellowships awarded in 2014: Guggenheim Fellowships have been awarded annually since 1925, by the John Simon Guggenheim Memorial Foundation to those "who have demonstrated exceptional capacity for productive scholarship or exceptional creative ability in the arts."

Fellow	Category	Field of Study
Lynn Aldrich	Creative Arts	Fine Arts
Nezar AlSayyad	Humanities	Architecture, Planning, & Design
Chloe Aridjis	Creative Arts	Fiction
Mark Aronoff	Humanities	Linguistics
Rania Attieh	Creative Arts	Film-Video
Mowry Baden	Creative Arts	Fine Arts
Annie Baker	Creative Arts	Drama & Performance Art
Deborah Baker	Creative Arts	General Nonfiction
Ivy Baldwin	Creative Arts	Choreography
Jamie Baum	Creative Arts	Music Composition
Asef Bayat	Humanities	Near Eastern Studies
Anthony Bebbington	Social Sciences	Geography & Environmental Studies
Susan Bee	Creative Arts	Fine Arts
Judith Belzer	Creative Arts	Fine Arts
Ellen Berkenblit	Creative Arts	Fine Arts
Susan Bernofsky	Humanities	Translation
Ann Blair	Humanities	Intellectual & Cultural History
Holly Brewer	Social Sciences	Constitutional Studies
Kathy Butterly	Creative Arts	Fine Arts
Christopher Castellani	Creative Arts	Fiction
Kenneth Catania	Natural Sciences	Neuroscience
Xavier Cha	Creative Arts	Fine Arts
Myriam J. A. Chancy	Humanities	Literary Criticism
Patty Chang	Creative Arts	Fine Arts
Mung Chiang	Natural Sciences	Engineering
William Chittick	Humanities	Translation
Deborah Coen	Humanities	History of Science, Technology, & Economics
Rachel Cohen	Creative Arts	General Nonfiction
Andrew Cole	Humanities	Medieval & Renaissance Literature
Sarah Cole	Humanities	Literary Criticism
Gene Coleman	Creative Arts	Music Composition
Steve Coleman	Creative Arts	Music Composition
Pier Consagra	Creative Arts	Fine Arts
Anna Conway	Creative Arts	Fine Arts
Heather Courtney	Creative Arts	Film-Video
Donald Crafton	Humanities	Film, Video, & Radio Studies
Thomas E. Crow	Humanities	Fine Arts Research
Will Crutchfield	Humanities	Music Research
Dorit Cypis	Creative Arts	Fine Arts
Jacob P. Dalton	Humanities	Religion
Nancy Davidson	Creative Arts	Fine Arts
Robert Dawson	Creative Arts	Photography
Daniel Diermeier	Social Sciences	Political Science
Chris Doyle	Creative Arts	Film-Video
Greg Drasler	Creative Arts	Fine Arts
Denise Duhamel	Creative Arts	Poetry
Arienne Dwyer	Humanities	Linguistics
Anver Emon	Social Sciences	Law
David Engerman	Humanities	U.S. History
Jonathan Feng	Natural Sciences	Physics
Joyce Flueckiger	Humanities	Religion
Devin Fore	Humanities	Intellectual & Cultural History
Emily Fragos	Creative Arts	Poetry
LaToya Frazier	Creative Arts	Photography
Jason Fulford	Creative Arts	Photography
Randall Fuller	Humanities	American Literature
Phyllis Galembo	Creative Arts	Photography
Daniel Garcia	Creative Arts	Film-Video
Ann Grodzins Gold	Humanities	South Asian Studies
Miriam Golden	Social Sciences	Political Science
Jack Goldstone	Social Sciences	Sociology
Joseph P. Gone	Social Sciences	Psychology
Emily Fox Gordon	Creative Arts	General Nonfiction
Phyllis Green	Creative Arts	Fine Arts
Lillian Guerra	Humanities	European & Latin American History
Gregory Halpern	Creative Arts	Photography
Thor Hanson	Creative Arts	Science Writing
Joy Harjo	Creative Arts	General Nonfiction
Matthew Harris	Natural Sciences	Organismic Biology & Ecology
David G. Haskell	Creative Arts	Science Writing
Sharon Hayes	Creative Arts	Film-Video
Robert Hite	Creative Arts	Fine Arts
John Holt	Humanities	Religion
Jiaxing Huang	Natural Sciences	Chemistry
Yunte Huang	Creative Arts	General Nonfiction
Shannon Jackson	Humanities	Theatre Arts
Karl Jacoby	Humanities	U.S. History
Jamie James	Creative Arts	General Nonfiction
Ray Jayawardhana	Natural Sciences	Science Writing
Eric Jennings	Humanities	European & Latin American History
James Johnson	Humanities	Intellectual & Cultural History
Jesse Jones	Creative Arts	Music Composition
Fady Joudah	Creative Arts	Poetry
Arthur Kampela	Creative Arts	Music Composition
Sarah Kay	Humanities	Medieval & Renaissance Literature
Kiran Kedlaya	Natural Sciences	Mathematics
Robin Kelley	Humanities	U.S. History
Mark Kendall	Creative Arts	Film-Video
Brenda Kenneally	Creative Arts	Photography
Eva Kittay	Humanities	Philosophy
Jun Korenaga	Natural Sciences	Earth Science
Mikel Kuehn	Creative Arts	Music Composition
Hari Kunzru	Creative Arts	Fiction
William Lamson	Creative Arts	Fine Arts
Jill Lepore	Humanities	U.S. History
Jonathan Levin	Social Sciences	Economics
Meira Levinson	Social Sciences	Education
Doron Levy	Natural Sciences	Applied Mathematics
Kent Lightfoot	Social Sciences	Anthropology & Cultural Studies
Diana Liverman	Social Sciences	Geography & Environmental Studies
Joshua Marston	Creative Arts	Film-Video
Adrian Matejka	Creative Arts	Poetry
D.T. Max	Creative Arts	General Nonfiction
Carla Mazzio	Humanities	English Literature
Cecilia Menjivar	Social Sciences	Sociology
Andrea Miller	Creative Arts	Choreography
Tracy Miller	Creative Arts	Fine Arts
Rashaun Mitchell	Creative Arts	Choreography
Ange Mlinko	Creative Arts	Poetry
Naeem Mohaiemen	Creative Arts	Film-Video
Scott Monroe	Social Sciences	Psychology
Young Min Moon	Creative Arts	Fine Arts
Andrew Moore	Creative Arts	Photography
Dean Moss	Creative Arts	Choreography
Terence Nance	Creative Arts	Film-Video
Eric Nathan	Creative Arts	Music Composition
Patrick Nickell	Creative Arts	Fine Arts
Lori Nix	Creative Arts	Photography
Carrie Noland	Humanities	Dance Studies
Michael Nylan	Humanities	East Asian Studies
Meghan O'Rourke	Creative Arts	General Nonfiction
Aude Oliva	Natural Sciences	Computer Science
Susan Orlean	Creative Arts	General Nonfiction
Julie Orringer	Creative Arts	Fiction
Serguei Oushakine	Social Sciences	Anthropology & Cultural Studies
John Palmer	Humanities	Classics
L.A. Paul	Humanities	Philosophy
Monika Piazzesi	Social Sciences	Economics
Niles Pierce	Natural Sciences	Engineering
Matthew Pillsbury	Creative Arts	Photography
Steven Pincus	Humanities	European & Latin American History
Catherine Prendergast	Humanities	Intellectual and Cultural History
Hamid Rahmanian	Creative Arts	Film-Video
Rayna Rapp	Social Sciences	Anthropology & Cultural Studies
Victoria Redel	Creative Arts	Fiction
Mary Reid Kelley	Creative Arts	Film-Video
Paisley Rekdal	Creative Arts	Poetry
Peter Rock	Creative Arts	Fiction
Austin Roorda	Natural Sciences	Neuroscience
Lainie Ross	Natural Sciences	Medicine & Health
Elena Ruehr	Creative Arts	Music Composition
Marina Rustow	Humanities	Medieval & Renaissance History
Mark Ruwedel	Creative Arts	Photography
Lynne Sachs	Creative Arts	Film-Video
David Sandlin	Creative Arts	Fine Arts
Haun Saussy	Humanities	East Asian Studies
Elliott Sharp	Humanities	Music Composition
Susan Sidlauskas	Humanities	Fine Arts Research
Judith Simonian	Creative Arts	Fine Arts
Jeffrey Skinner	Creative Arts	Poetry
Helmut Smith	Humanities	European & Latin American History
Patricia Smith	Creative Arts	Poetry
Stacey Steers	Creative Arts	Film-Video
Daniel L. Stein	Natural Sciences	Applied Mathematics
Rachel Sussman	Creative Arts	Photography
Victoria Sweet	Creative Arts	General Nonfiction
Nathan Swenson	Natural Sciences	Plant Sciences
Stephanie Syjuco	Creative Arts	Fine Arts
Mary Szybist	Creative Arts	Poetry
Emily Talen	Humanities	Architecture, Planning, & Design
Stephen Taylor	Creative Arts	Music Composition
Emily Thompson	Humanities	Film, Video, & Radio Studies
Joseph Thornton	Natural Sciences	Molecular & Cellular Biology
Peter Tse	Social Sciences	Psychology
Gary Urton	Social Sciences	Anthropology and Cultural Studies
Fred Valentine	Creative Arts	Fine Arts
Sylvain Veilleux	Natural Sciences	Astronomy-Astrophysics
Ashvin Vishwanath	Natural Sciences	Physics
Lu Wang	Creative Arts	Music Composition
Claire Vaye Watkins	Creative Arts	Fiction
John Watkins	Humanities	English Literature
Kate Weare	Creative Arts	Choreography
Deke Weaver	Creative Arts	Drama & Performance Art
Lois Weaver	Creative Arts	Drama & Performance Art
Marjorie Welish	Creative Arts	Poetry
Bonna Wescoat	Humanities	Classics
Alexandra Wettlaufer	Humanities	European & Latin American Literature
Marco Williams	Creative Arts	Film-Video
