= Gray Brechin =

American geologist, architectural historian and writer

Gray A. Brechin (born September 2, 1947) is an American geographer, architectural historian, and author. He is the founder and Project Scholar of The Living New Deal based at the U.C. Berkeley Department of Geography.

== Early life and education ==
Brechin graduated from Awalt High School (now Mountain View High School) in 1965. He received a double degree in history and geography from UC Berkeley and a master’s degree in art history. After working as a journalist for 12 years he returned to UC Berkeley to obtain a doctorate in geography.

== Activism ==
In 1978 Brechin began as the first director of the Mono Lake Committee whose goal to stop the destruction of Mono Lake. Water destined for Mono Lake was being diverted to Los Angeles, reducing the lake's volume by half. Brechin joined in 1978 as the first director, and lobbied in Sacramento with ecologist David Gaines and other committee members to save the lake. Brechin traveled California giving talks to publicize the lake's plight.

In 1992, Brechin and photographer Robert Dawson were awarded the Lange-Taylor Prize by Duke University, funding their collaboration on a five-year project that was published in March 1999 as Farewell, Promised Land: Waking from the California Dream. The San Diego Historical Society reviewed the book as a necessary reference "to all California environmentalists and policymakers", though its photographs and text focused largely on Northern California rather than the whole state.

Dawson and Brechin decided in 2002 to write a book documenting the many construction and beautification efforts of the 1930s sponsored by the New Deal programs of President Franklin Delano Roosevelt. In 2003, they realized the scope was too large for two people, and in 2006 Brechin created the collaborative project California Living New Deal so that many people could participate as volunteers. Retired software engineer Jay McCauley programmed a database-driven dynamically interactive map for the group. In 2011, the project was enlarged to include all of the United States, dropping the word "California" to become The Living New Deal. The database application was expanded by software engineers from UC Berkeley's Institute for Research on Labor and Employment. By 2020, the website had catalogued some 16,000 sites of New Deal construction and beautification.

== Works ==
- Imperial San Francisco: Urban Power, Earthly Ruin. University of California Press. 1999. ISBN 9780520215689.
- Brechin, Gray; Dawson, Robert (1999). Farewell, Promised Land: Waking from the California Dream. University of California Press. ISBN 9780520211230.
