= Planetizen =

American city planning news website

- Website type: News website
- Available in: English
- Website: www.planetizen.com
- Commercial: Yes
- Launched: February 2000; 26 years ago

Planetizen is a planning-related news website and e-learning platform based in Los Angeles, California. It features user-submitted news, editor-evaluated news and weekly user-contributed op-eds about urban planning and several related fields. The website also publishes an annual list of the top 10 books in the field published during the current year, and a directory and ranking of graduate-level education in the field of urban planning.

The name of the website is a concatenation of Plan, as in the word, planning, and Netizen, a portmanteau of Internet and citizen. The website self-reports that it is visited by 1.5 million unique visitors each year.

In 2006, the website also started publishing books, including the first urban planning book for children, Where Things Are, From Near to Far, published in 2008 by Planetizen Press. This book was reviewed by The New York Times. Their 2007 book Planetizen's Contemporary Debates in Urban Planning, a collection of brief essays published by Island Press, received positive reviews.

== Contributions ==
Planetizen emerged during a transition in American urbanism following the decades of post-WWII car-oriented development. By the turn of the 21st century, traditional American planning paradigms were increasingly challenged by new design movements, such as New Urbanism. Founded in 2000 at the dawn of the mainstream internet era, Planetizen established a digital platform that aggregated international and domestic planning practices.

Rather than advocating for a single design or policy framework, the platform functions as an ideological clearinghouse, juxtaposing diverse and competing planning practices for an audience of urban planners, architects, and urbanologists. By facilitating this open exchange of global frameworks without institutional prejudice, the website expanded the scope of contemporary American city planning and integrated it with broader international urbanest discourse.

== Innovations and debates ==
=== Suburban sprawl ===
The major problem in developed economies is urban sprawl and its energy-devouring urban morphology. Planetizen has broadly championed the New Urbanism solutions while juxtaposing a variety of alternatives and criticisms. This interplay lays the groundwork for facing a difficult problem. Debate on Planetizen juxtaposes practical concerns of developers and government entities with the need for more sustainable urban fabric. Developers who build Sprawl are being educated towards new strategies for a more livable suburbia.

=== Informal settlements ===
In developing economies, urban planning challenges often involve informal settlements, including Brazil's Favelas, Argentina's villas Miserias, and Turkey's Gecekondus. While academic and institutional coverage of informal urbanism has historically been limited, Planetizen has featured discussions on these topics. For example, the platform hosted a forum on the Dharavi settlement in Mumbai, focusing on the debate between slum clearance and community upgrading.[1]".

=== Skyscrapers/tall buildings ===
World economies and major construction companies are driven in part by building megaprojects, the most prominent component of which is one or more skyscrapers. Planetizen has opened up the debate on skyscrapers more than once. A city has to balance the drive to build high, using high-tech, with the theoretical objections that skyscrapers drain the resources and energy from the region in which they are implanted. New skyscrapers are claimed to be eco-sustainable, but those claims have as many critics as they have proponents. Again, there is a need for a broad debate, and Planetizen contains many different and dissenting viewpoints on the question of skyscrapers as a viable building typology.

== Planning Graduate Program Rankings ==
Planetizen has ranked planning graduate programs in the United States through six editions of its Guide to Urban Planning Graduate Programs, and has published the top 10 ranks on its website.

Planetizen Guide's Top Graduate Planning Programs by Edition
| Rank | 7th Edition (2023) | 6th Edition (2019) | 5th Edition (2017) | 4th Edition (2015) | 3rd Edition (2012) | 2nd Edition (2009) | 1st Edition (2007) |
|---|---|---|---|---|---|---|---|
| 1 | University of California, Los Angeles (UCLA) | MIT | MIT | MIT | MIT | MIT | MIT |
| 2 | Massachusetts Institute of Technology (MIT) | Berkeley | Berkeley | Berkeley | Cornell | Berkeley | Berkeley |
| 3 | Rutgers, The State University of New Jersey (Rutgers) | Rutgers | UNC-Chapel Hill | Urbana-Champaign | Rutgers | UNC-Chapel Hill | UNC-Chapel Hill |
| 4 | University of California, Berkeley (Berkeley) | UCLA | UCLA | UCLA | Berkeley | Rutgers | Harvard |
| 5 | University of North Carolina, Chapel Hill (UNC-Chapel Hill) | UNC-Chapel Hill | Rutgers | Georgia Tech | Urbana-Champaign | Urbana-Champaign | UPenn |
| 6 | Georgia Institute of Technology (Georgia Tech) | Harvard | Harvard | Rutgers | UNC-Chapel Hill | Cornell | UCLA |
| 7 | Harvard University (Harvard) | University of Pennsylvania (UPenn) | Georgia Tech | Cornell | USC | Harvard | Cornell |
| 8 | University of Southern California (USC) | USC | University of Illinois, Urbana-Champaign (Urbana-Champaign) | UNC-Chapel Hill | Georgia Tech | UCLA | Rutgers |
| 9 | University of Texas at Austin (UT-Austin) | University of Michigan | USC | USC | UCLA | USC | USC |
| 10 | Tufts University (Tufts) | Georgia Tech | Cornell University (Cornell) | Harvard | UPenn | UPenn | Urbana-Champaign |

== Criticism ==
Planetizen is often criticized for running news stories or user-contributed op-eds that are critical of current urban planning practices. Planetizen is also criticized by some urban planning educators in higher education for ranking graduate-level urban planning programs in the Guide to Graduate Urban Planning Education.

== Timeline ==
- February 2000 - Planetizen is created
- August 2000 - First contributed op-ed, by Anthony Downs
- February 2001 - Site recognized with an award for use of technology by the American Planning Association
- September 2001 - James Howard Kunstler and Nikos A. Salingaros call for the end of skyscrapers in response to September 11 attacks, in an article on Planetizen, The End of Tall Buildings
- November 2002 - First annual review of top 10 books in the field of urban planning
- February 2005 - Planetizen moves to the Drupal web publishing platform and documents the migration in an article for Linux Journal.
- March 2006 - Planetizen associate editor Nate Berg begins weekly podcast about weekly urban planning issues
- June 2006 - Planetizen Press publishes first ranking of graduate-level urban planning programs
- May 2008 - Planetizen Press publishes second ranking of graduate-level urban planning programs
- October 2009 - Planetizen publishes a list of the top 100 urban thinkers, as voted on by visitors to the website
- April 2011 - Planetizen publishes a list of the top 25 thinkers in urban planning and technology
- May 2011 - Planetizen publishes 2012 ranking of graduate-level urban planning] programs
- October 2014 - Planetizen publishes 2015 ranking of graduate-level urban planning programs
- February 2015 - Planetizen launches the first video courses focused on educating urban planners
- June 2017 - Planetizen publishes 4th Edition ranking of graduate-level urban planning programs
- October 2017 - Planetizen publishes a list of the 100 most influential urbanists.
- May 2018 - Planetizen publishes Urban Design for Planners by Emily Talen.

== Editors ==
The site was created in February 2000 by co-editors in chief Abhijeet Chavan and Chris Steins. In 2005 David Gest was appointed the first managing editor. Subsequent managing editors have included Christian Peralta Madera (2006), Timothy Halbur (2008), Jonathan Nettler, AICP (2012) and James Brasuell (2014).

== Planetizen Press ==
Planetizen Press is the publishing arm of Planetizen, and has published several print books.

- Planetizen Guide to Graduate Urban Planning Programs, 4th Edition. Published by Planetizen Press (2014).
- Unsprawl: Remixing Spaces as Places. Published by Planetizen Press (2013).
- Planetizen 2012 Guide to Graduate Urban Planning Programs. Published by Planetizen Press (May, 2011).
- Insider's Guide to Careers in Urban Planning. Published by Planetizen Press (November, 2009).
- Where Things Are, from Near to Far: A Children's book about urban planning. Published by Planetizen Press (December, 2008).
- Planetizen 2009 Guide to Graduate Urban Planning Programs. Published by Planetizen Press (May, 2008).
- Planetizen 2007 Guide to Graduate Urban Planning Programs. Published by Planetizen Press (June, 2006).
