= Robert Hite (disambiguation) =

Robert Hite (born 1984) is an American basketball player.

Robert Hite may also refer to:

- Robert Hite (artist) (1956–2020), American visual artist
- Robert L. Hite (1920–2015), World War II pilot, Doolittle Raider and prisoner of war
- Wood Hite (Robert Woodson Hite, 1850–1881), outlaw and cousin of Frank and Jesse James
- Bob Hite (1943–1981), musician
- Bob Hite (announcer) (1914–2000), American radio and television announcer
