= Arienne Dwyer =

American linguist

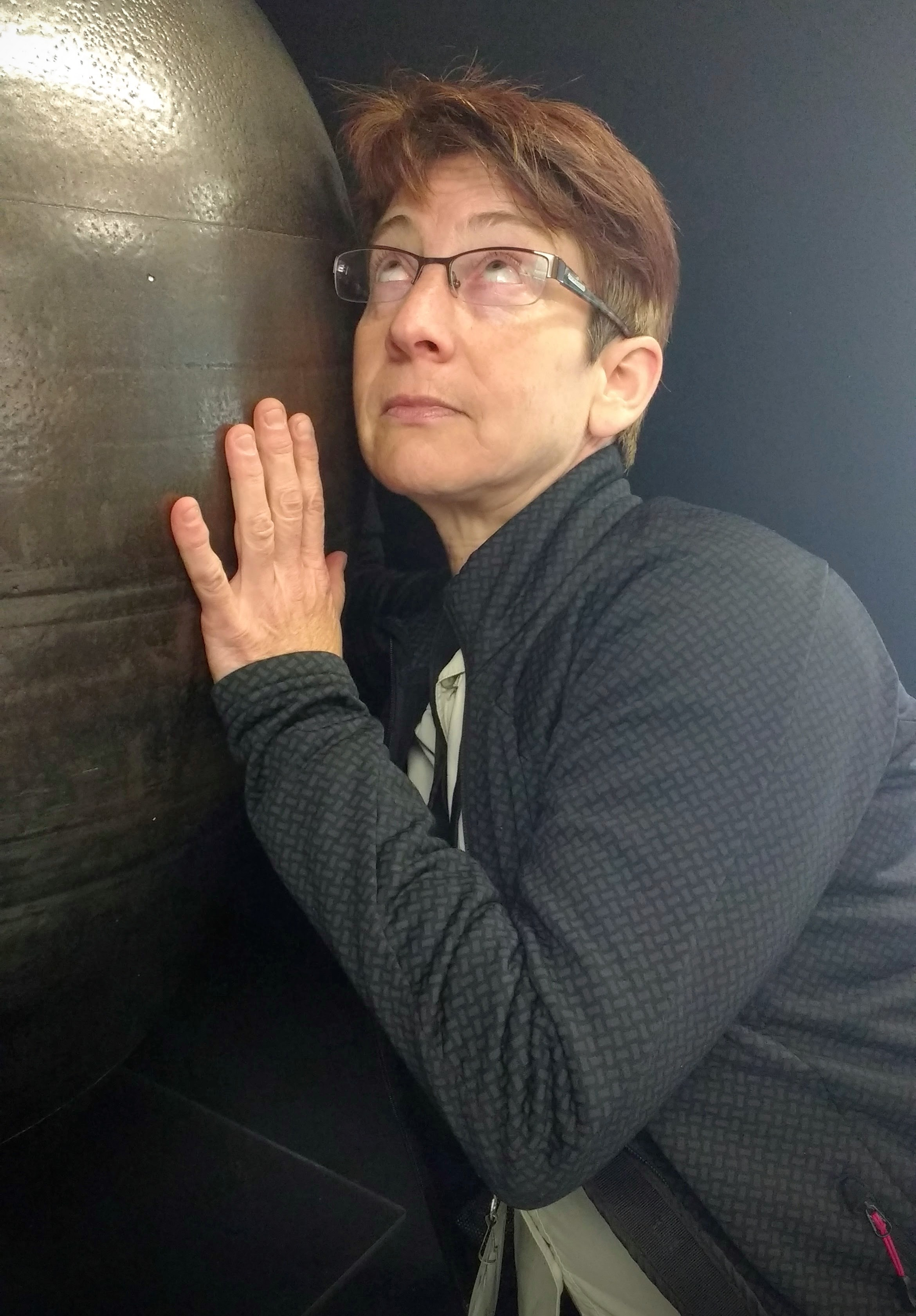
Arienne Dwyer

Arienne Dwyer is an American linguist, anthropologist and educator. A Professor Emerita at the University of Kansas, she has been a professor of Linguistic Anthropology in the Department of Anthropology since 2001.

== Early life, family and education ==
Arienne Dwyer is the daughter of flutist Doriot Anthony Dwyer and a descendant of women's rights activist Susan B. Anthony.

She earned her PhD in 1996 in Altaic and Chinese Linguistics at the University of Washington. She was a Humboldt postdoctoral research fellow and Volkswagen-DOBES grantee at the Johannes Gutenberg-Universität Mainz.

== Career ==
Dwyer has been a professor of Linguistic Anthropology in the Department of Anthropology at the University of Kansas since 2001. She is also an affiliate Professor of Linguistics at the University of Washington. In 2010 she co-founded KU's Institute for Digital Research in the Humanities, and co-directed it until 2018.

Dwyer conducts research into the languages and cultures of Inner and Central Asia, especially languages in the Turkic, Sinitic, and Mongolic families. She has also published pedagogical and linguistic materials for the Uyghur language.

Her research is notable in arguing for the areal significance of Chinese Inner Asia as a Sprachbund, a region of language convergence. Her research also looks at issues of language documentation, Open Access and language ideology. In 2014, her work led to her being named a Fellow of the John Simon Guggenheim Memorial Foundation.

Dwyer received National Science Foundation (NSF) funding for and directed Institute on Collaborative Language Research (CoLang 2012), inviting Carlos Nash to be co-director. CoLang is an international training workshop in in situ language documentation supported by the NSL, convening in even years.

Since 2010, her collaborative work has focused on sharing analyzed language resources, including a pilot website Interactive Inner Asia, which provided some samples of language materials based on Dwyer's VW-DOBES project, and the Uyghur 2.0 website, which includes the Uyghur Light Verbs project (on the diachrony of modern Uyghur complex predicates), and the Analyzing Turki Manuscripts Online (ATMO) project (creating digital editions of late eastern Chaghatay/early modern Uyghur language texts, with a focus on cultural and linguistic analysis of medical manuscripts and social network analysis).

== Selected publications ==
- Dwyer, Arienne M. (1998). "The texture of tongues: Languages and power in China". Nationalism and Ethnic Politics. 4 (1–2): 68–85. doi:10.1080/13537119808428529. hdl:1808/7067. ISSN 1353-7113.
- Dwyer, Arienne M. (2005). The Xinjiang Conflict: Uyghur identity, Language, Policy, and Political discourse (PDF). Policy Studies. Vol. 15. Washington, DC: East-West Center Washington. hdl:10125/3504. ISBN 1-932728-29-5.
- Dwyer, Arienne M. (2007). Salar: a study in Inner Asian areal contact processes, Part I: Phonology. Wiesbaden: Otto Harrassowitz. ISBN 9783447040914.
- Harrison, K. David; Rood, David; Dwyer, Arienne M. (2008). Lessons from Documented Endangered Languages. Philadelphia/Amsterdam: John Benjamins. ISBN 9789027229908.
- Engesæth, Tarjei; Yakup, Mahire; Dwyer, Arienne M. (2010). Teklimakandin Salam: hazirqi zaman Uyghur tili qollanmisi / Greetings from the Teklimakan: a handbook of Modern Uyghur. Lawrence, KS: University of Kansas ScholarWorks. ISBN 978-1-936153-03-9.
- Dwyer, Arienne M. (10 June 2016). "Bringing Digital Data Management into Methods Courses: Linguistic Anthropology Module". Bringing Digital Data Management Training into Methods Courses for Anthropology. American Anthropological Association.
- "Linguistic Anthropology Module (modified version)". Arienne M. Dwyer. September 2016.
- Dwyer, Arienne M.; Lloyd-Smith, Lindsay; Oths, Kathryn; Perry, George H. (10 June 2016). Femenías, Blenda (ed.). "General Principles and Practices of Digital Data Management" (PDF). Bringing Digital Data Management Training into Methods Courses for Anthropology. American Anthropological Association.
- Dwyer, Arienne M. (September 2016). "General Principles and Practices of Digital Data Management (alternative URL)". hdl:1808/22670.
- Dwyer, Arienne M. (2016). "Endangered Turkic Languages of China". In Eker, Süer; Şavk, Ülkü Çelik (eds.). Tehlikedeki Türk Dilleri: Kuramsal ve genel yaklaşımlar / Endangered Turkic Languages: Theoretical and general approaches. Ankara: International Turkic Academy. pp. 431–450. hdl:1808/23398. ISBN 978-9944237475.
- Dwyer, Arienne M. (2016). "Ordinary insubordination as transient discourse". In Evans, Nicholas; Watanabe, Honoré (eds.). Insubordination. Amsterdam: Benjamins. pp. 183–208. hdl:1808/22671. ISBN 978-9944237475.
- Dwyer, Arienne M. (2017). "Manuscript Technologies, Writing and Reading in Early 20th Century Kashgar". In Bellér-Hann, Ildiko; Sugawara, Jun; Schlyter, Birgit (eds.). Kashgar Revisited: The Life and Work of Ambassador Gunnar Jarring. Amsterdam: Brill. pp. 183–208. hdl:1808/23399. ISBN 9789004330078.
- Dwyer, Arienne M; Zepeda, Ofelia; Lachler, Jordan; Underriner, Janne (2018). "Training Institutes for Language Revitalization". In Hinton, Leanne; Huss, Leena; Roche, Gerald (eds.). The Routledge Handbook of Language Revitalization. Routledge. pp. 61–69. hdl:1808/22671. ISBN 9781138674493.
- Li, Charles N; Dwyer, Arienne M (2020). A dictionary of Eastern Bonan. University of Kansas ScholarWorks. hdl:1808/30523. ISBN 978-1-936153-18-3.
