= Mary Reid Kelley =

American artist

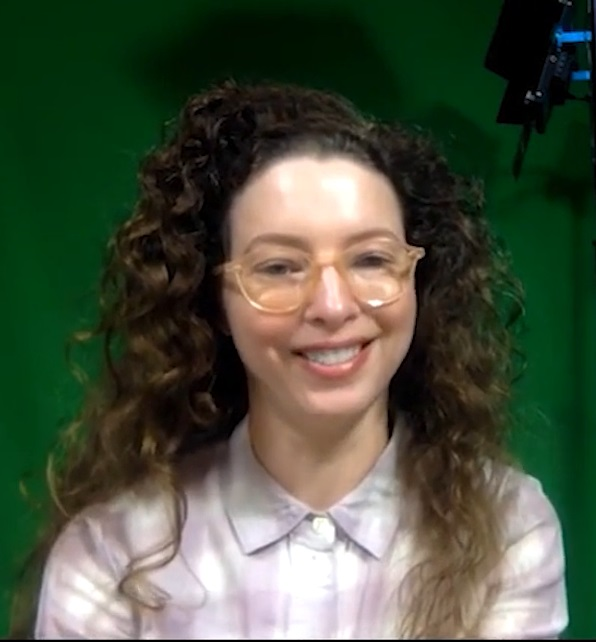
- Mary Reid Kelley at the Contemporary Dayton, Ohio, 2023
- Born: 1979 (age 46–47)
- Education: St. Olaf College (BFA), Yale University (MFA)
- Notable work: The Syphilis of Sisyphus (2011), You Make Me Iliad (2010)
- Spouse: Patrick Kelley
- Awards: MacArthur Fellow, Baloise Art Prize, Guggenheim Fellowship
- Website: www.maryreidkelley.com

Mary Reid Kelley (born 1979) is an American artist based in upstate New York.

== Life ==
Mary Reid Kelley was born in Greenville, SC in 1979. She received her BFA from St. Olaf College in Minnesota and a MFA in painting from Yale University in 2009. Her black and white videos fuse classical drama, modern literature and contemporary pop culture into observations on gender, class, and urban development. They satirize the promise of progress through dense layering of cultural references ranging from southern church socials and women's magazines to Borges and Baudelaire. Reid Kelley often works in collaboration with her partner, Patrick Kelley, with whom she currently lives with in Saratoga Springs, New York.

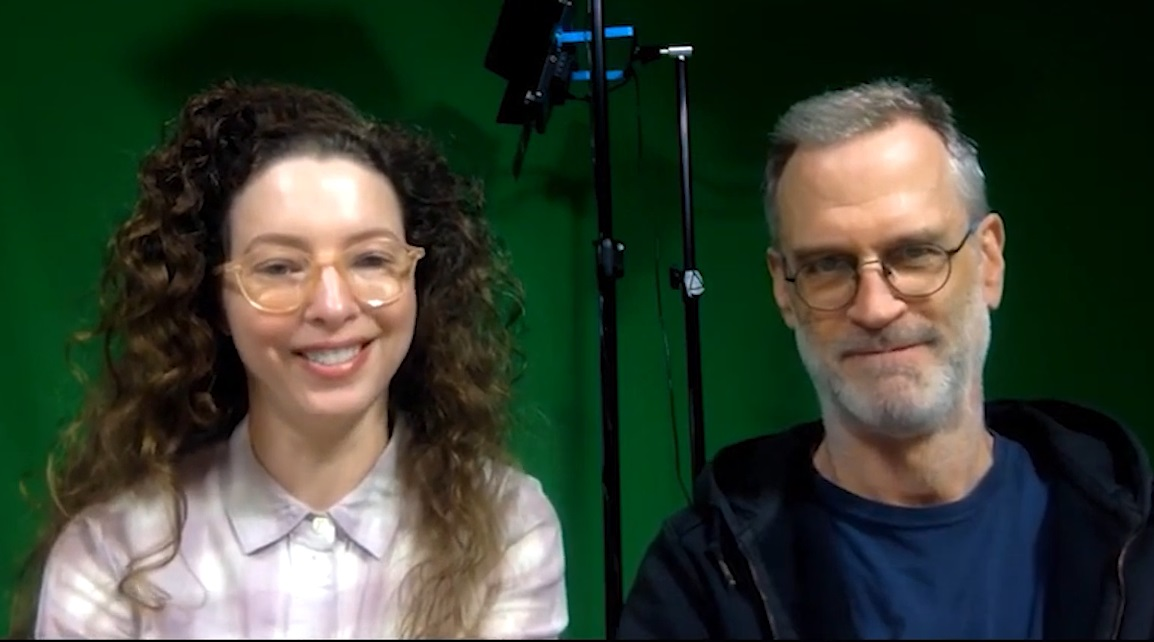
Mary Reid Kelley & Patrick Kelley at the Contemporary Dayton, Ohio, 2023

Reid Kelley is represented by the galleries Pilar Corrias in London, Susanne Vielmetter Los Angeles Projects in Los Angeles, CA and Fredericks & Freiser in New York, NY.

== Work ==
Reid Kelley is known for her short films, but often integrates her background of painting and drawing into her multimedia works. For example, in her 2015 short film, The Thong of Dionysus, she integrates her drawing and painting skills in the set's background as seen by the harshly drawn and sharply outlined portraits behind the minotaur. Her use of contrasting black and white further adds a cartoonish quality to her works, perpetuating the line between comedy and serious subject matter that Reid Kelley's works tend to play with. Reid Kelley herself noted her ability to intertwine these multiple genres of art, writing,

I realized that I was desperate to enact the characters that were the forces behind my 2D work, and that in doing so, all my ‘non-art’ loves like literature and costume and wordplay could be rolled up into a time based work that functioned like a shout-y, rambunctious, emotionally incontinent painting.

Writing in 2014, Daniel Belasco, curator of exhibitions and programs at the Samuel Dorsky Museum of Art at State University of New York at New Paltz, noted that Reid Kelley:

works in the vanguard of a generation that blends the digital and the analog to discourse with the millennia. From 2008 to the present, her astonishing videos have fused live performance, animation, drawing, sculpture, and digital design. Her poignant characters—a nurse, a prostitute, a bohemian, the Minotaur—confront the limits of their historical situations in droll verse. Blending Homer and Cindy Sherman by way of Virginia Woolf, Reid Kelley tells finely wrought narrative epics, rife with wordplay and art historical references, set in World War I, nineteenth-century Paris, and classical antiquity. Working with archival sources and a range of collaborators, especially Patrick Kelley, her husband and an accomplished artist, Reid Kelley invents a poetic mongrel media.

While studying at Yale, Reid Kelley benefited greatly from the archives of students who had left for World War One, realizing the importance of poetry for understanding both artistic and popular culture of the time. Her first four film projects focus on World War One: Camel Toe (2008), the Queen's English (2008), Sadie the Saddest Sadist (2009), and You Make Me Iliad (2010). In her research, Reid Kelley discovered that the female experience of these events was largely lost to the past, eclipsed by a profusion of poetry, literature and art produced by men. In an effort to pull women from the margins of historical records and textbooks, her work centers around female protagonists such as nurses, prostitutes, and factory workers. Eleanor Heartney emphasized this point when she wrote,

The films they create riff on commedia dell'arte, German Expressionist movies, and newspaper comic strips, reimagining them in a format that resembles an animated drawing. They leap promiscuously through history and mythology, emphasizing moments when gender roles and social structures were in flux.

Reid Kelley's narrative short films often take place during historical moments of social upheaval and war. Te themes of feminism and empowerment of women's voices remain fairly constant, but her style tends to vary depending on the subject matter of her projects.

Interweaving historical and literary references, euphemisms, and clever puns within the parameters of rhyming verse, her scripts are both humorous and complex. Her humorous lines are delivered with a deadpan quality, emphasizing the effectiveness of both her acting and writing styles. The result is a delightful manipulation of language that satirizes established social structures while disrupting concepts of logic and reason with its nonsensical qualities.

Reid Kelley has been the subject of many awards and honors throughout her career. She was awarded the MacArthur Fellowship in 2016, the Baloise Art Prize in 2016, and the Guggenheim Fellowship in 2014.

=== You Make Me Iliad (2010) ===
You Make Me Iliad is a work created by Reid Kelley in 2010. The work is 14 minutes long and 49 seconds, and it is shot completely in black and white. The story of the project follows two characters, a prostitute and a soldier, in German-occupied Belgium during the First World War; Reid Kelley portrays both characters. She follows the theme of storytelling for women lost in history through witty lines and sharp humor contrasted against the background of sorrow and hardship. Reid Kelley was inspired to tell the story of her World War One heroine after discovering that most literature of the World War One era was written by men, leading to her heroine's story largely being narrated by the men in her life. This choice both reflects the problems of archival records that have largely been shaped by male voices and the irony of a woman's story being told by men who are largely ignorant to such experiences.

=== The Syphilis of Sisyphus (2011) ===
The Syphilis of Sisyphus was created by Reid Kelley in 2011. The work is 11 minutes long and two seconds, and it is shot completely in black and white. The story follows themes similar to other of Reid Kelley's work, following the story of a pregnant young woman, Sisyphus, who has contracted syphilis; Reid Kelley plays the role of Sisyphus. As in her other works, Reid Kelley intertwines her poetic storytelling with humorous additions to bring light to the story of a forgotten and doomed woman in a highly romanticized time period: the French La Belle Époque.

=== We Are Ghosts (2017) ===
We Are Ghosts is a more recent project. It was featured at the Tate Liverpool and the Baltimore Museum of Art, and was Reid Kelley's first museum solo project to be displayed in the UK. The work reimagines life on a U.S. submarine, taking place at the end of World War Two. The exhibition featured two of her classically black and white stylized short films: In the Body of the Sturgeon and This is Offal. The exhibition also displayed Reid Kelley's artistic strengths outside of film, showcasing her life-size light-box portraits of the characters shown in her films. The work also follows the typical narration style used by Reid Kelley, blending poetry from historical sources to retell less glamorous and more realistic stories. Such accounts do not hedge around the misery and challenges faced by the characters, but they still maintain humorous and satirical themes.

== Solo exhibitions ==
- 2012: Performing Histories: Mary Reid Kelley, Salina Art Center, Salina, Kansas
- 2012: H/Qu: Mary Reid Kelley with Patrick Kelley, Bard Center for Curatorial Studies, Annandale on Hudson, NY
- 2012: The Syphilis of Sisyphis, The Box at Wexner Center for the Arts, Columbus, Ohio
- 2013: Sadie, The Saddest Sadist and Priapus Agonistes, Yale University Art Gallery, New Haven, Connecticut
- 2013: Mary Reid Kelley, Institute of Contemporary Art, Boston, Boston, Massachusetts
- 2013: The Syphilis of Sisyphis, The Contemporary Austin, Austin, Texas
- 2013: Priapus Agonistes, Susanne Vielmetter Los Angeles Projects, Los Angeles
- January 22 – April 13, 2014: Mary Reid Kelley: Working Objects and Videos, Samuel Dorsky Museum of Art, State University of New York at New Paltz
- July 10 – October 18, 2014: Mary Reid Kelley: Working Objects and Videos, University Art Museum, University at Albany, SUNY, Albany, NY
- February 11–27, 2016: The Syphilis of Sisyphus, Rosebud (satellite gallery of the Rose Art Museum), Waltham, MA
- November 17, 2017 – March 18, 2018: Mary Reid Kelley: We Are Ghosts, Tate Liverpool, Liverpool, UK
- April 4 – August 29, 2018: Mary Reid Kelly: We Are Ghosts, Baltimore Museum of Art, Baltimore, MD
