= Catherine Prendergast =

American literary scholar

- Awards: Guggenheim Fellowship (2014)

Academic background
- Education: Columbia University (BA); University of Wisconsin, Madison (PhD)

Academic work
- Discipline: Intellectual history
- Institutions: University of Illinois Urbana-Champaign

Catherine Jean Prendergast is an American literary scholar and author of narrative nonfiction. She is Professor Emerita of English at the University of Illinois Urbana-Champaign.

== Biography ==
Prendergast received her B.A. from Columbia University in 1990 and a Ph.D. from the University of Wisconsin–Madison in 1997. Her research focuses on the intersections of social and literary, cultural movements as well as the spread of the English language.

Her book Literacy and Racial Justice: The Politics of Learning after Brown v. Board of Education (2003) has won the Mina P. Shaughnessy Award from the Modern Language Association for "an outstanding scholarly book in the fields of language, culture, literacy, and literature that has a strong application to the teaching of English."

Prendergast received a Guggenheim Fellowship in 2014 to support research for her book, The Gilded Edge, which investigates the circumstances surrounding the Carmel-by-the-Sea writer colony suicides of Nora May French, George Sterling, and Carrie Sterling by cyanide ingestion.

== Personal life and family ==
Her father, Kevin H. Prendergast, was the chair of Columbia's astronomy department known for his work in the field of many-body systems. Her uncle, Robert Prendergast, was a coxswain for Columbia's rowing team who painted the blue and white "C" over the Spuyten Duyvil cliff and later a professor of immunology at Johns Hopkins University.
