= Miriam A. Golden =

Political economist

- Born: Miriam Anne Golden; 1954 (age 71–72)
- Occupation: Political economist
- Title: Peter Mair Chair in Comparative Politics

Academic background
- Education: University of California, Berkeley, London School of Economics and Political Science
- Alma mater: Cornell University
- Thesis: Austerity and its opposition : Italian working class politics in the 1970s (1983)

Academic work
- Institutions: European University Institute
- Website: https://www.miriamgolden.com/

Miriam A. Golden is a political scientist and the Peter Mair Chair in Comparative Politics at the European University Institute. Her research focuses on the selection, responsiveness, and accountability of politicians in Asia, Europe, Africa and North America.

== Career ==
Golden studied political science at the University of California at Berkeley and the London School of Economics and Political Science before, receiving her Ph.D. in government from Cornell University in 1983. In 1982, she became a lecturer in government at Cornell University before working as an assistant professor of Political Science at the University of New Mexico from 1983 to 1984. She was also an assistant professor in government at Wesleyan University from 1984 to 1989 before working as an assistant professor with the University of California at Los Angeles in 1989 becoming associate professor in 1993, Professor in 1994, and Professor Emerita in 2019. She is also an Associate Member of Nuffield College at the University of Oxford.

Golden was a recipient of the John Simon Guggenheim Memorial Foundation Fellowship in 2014 and was a Fellow of the Centre for Advanced Study in the Behavioural Sciences at Stanford University from 2018 to 2019. She is also a member of the international network Evidence in Governance and Politics (EGAP) and a Research Fellow in Political Economy at the Center for Economic Research in Pakistan (CERP)

Her early research focused on labour politics in Western Europe, but has since expanded to political corruption, violence, criminality and electoral fraud. It has been supported by organisations such as National Science Foundation, the U.K.’s Department for International Development (DfID), the International Growth Center, and the governments of Canada and Quebec.

== Selected publications ==
=== Books ===
- Corruption: What Everyone Needs to Know (with Ray Fisman), New York: Oxford University Press, 2017.
- Heroic Defeats: The Politics of Job Loss. Cambridge: Cambridge University Press, 1997.
- Labor Divided: Austerity and Working Class Politics in Contemporary Italy. Ithaca: Cornell University Press,1988 received the1989-90 Choice Award for Outstanding Academic Books.

=== Articles ===
- `Electoral Fraud or Violence: The Effect of Observers on Party Manipulation Strategies,’ British Journal of Political Science, 49 (Jan. 2019), pp. 129–51. With Joseph Asunka, Sarah Brierley, Eric Kramon, and George Ofosu.
- `Distributive Politics Around the World,' Annual Review of Political Science, 16 (2013), pp. 73-99. With Brian Min.
- `Legislative Malfeasance and Political Accountability,' World Politics, 62 (April 2010), pp. 177-220. With Eric C.C. Chang and Seth Hill.
- `Electoral Systems, District Magnitude and Corruption,' British Journal of Political Science, 37 (Jan. 2007), pp. 111–37. With Eric C.C. Chang, received the American Political Science Association's Organized Section in Representation and Electoral Systems' 2008 Lawrence Longley Award for the best article published in 2007
- `Proposal for a New Measure of Corruption, Illustrated with Italian Data,'' Economics & Politics, 17 (March 2005), pp. 37–75. With Lucio Picci
