= DOBES =

Endangered languages preservation project

DOBES (or DoBeS) is the common abbreviation for the German name Dokumentation bedrohter Sprachen, "Documentation of Endangered Languages"), an international organization and project. The organization seeks to archive languages since it is expected many, if not most, of the world's languages (currently about 7,000 languages) will go extinct.
