= Robert Dawson (photographer) =

American photographer

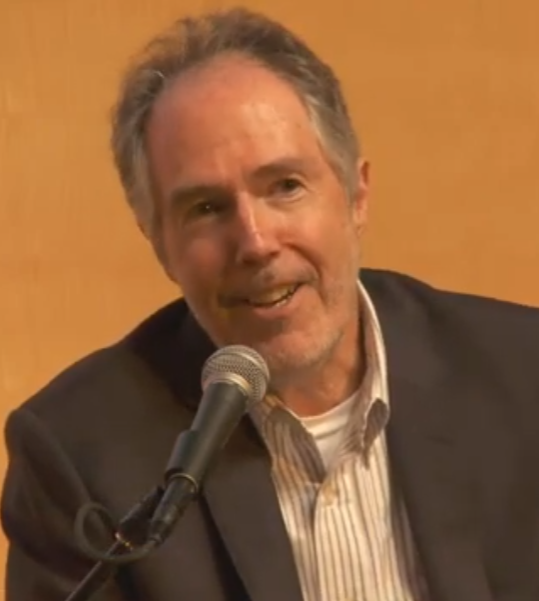
- In an interview at the San Francisco Public Library in 2014
- Born: 1950 (age 75–76); Sacramento, California, US
- Education: University of California, Santa Cruz; San Francisco State University
- Occupation: Photographer

Robert Dawson (born 1950) is an American photographer and instructor of photography at San Jose State University and Stanford University.

== Biography ==
Robert Dawson was born in Sacramento in 1950. He received a 2014 Guggenheim Fellowship for photography. Much of his photography has focused on California and its natural landscapes. In 2014, he published The Public Library, a book of photographs of public libraries across the United States taken over an eighteen-year period. He earned a BA from the University of California, Santa Cruz and a master's degree from San Francisco State University. His work has been exhibited or held in the permanent collections of institutions such as the Museum of Modern Art, the Bibliothèque Nationale de France, and the Library of Congress.
