= Carla Mazzio =

American literary and cultural critic

Carla Mazzio is an American literary and cultural critic. She specializes in early modern literature in relationship to the history of science, medicine, disability and health; the history of language, media technologies, and the printed book, and the history of speech pathologies with a focus on the harmful social construction of the “inarticulate” person or community. Her research has been supported by the Guggenheim Foundation, the National Endowment for the Humanities, and the Radcliffe Institute for Advanced Study at Harvard University.

== Biography ==
Carla Mazzio earned her B.A. from Barnard College and her Ph.D. in English from Harvard University. She has taught at the University of Michigan, Ann Arbor, the University of Chicago, the Bread Loaf School of English, and the University at Buffalo of the State University of New York, and currently teaches in the Department of English and co-directs the Medical and Health Humanities minor at the University of California, Riverside, where she co-founded and co-directs the UCR Health Humanities and Disability Justice Lab.

== Bibliography ==
=== Books ===
- Histories of the Future: On Shakespeare and Thinking Ahead, editor (Philadelphia, University of Pennsylvania Press, 2024)
- The Inarticulate Renaissance, Language Trouble in an Age of Eloquence (Philadelphia, University of Pennsylvania Press, 2009). ISBN 978-0812241389
- Book Use, Book Theory: 1500-1700, author with Bradin Cormack (Chicago: University of Chicago Libraries, distributed by University of Chicago Press), 2005. ISBN 978-0943056340
- Shakespeare & Science, editor, Special Double Issue of the Johns Hopkins Journal, South Central Review (Winter and Spring, 2009).
- Historicism, Psychoanalysis and Early Modern Culture, editor with Douglas Trevor (New York: Routledge, 2000). ISBN 978-0415920537
- The Body in Parts: Fantasies of Corporeality in Early Modern Europe, editor with David Hillman (New York: Routledge, 1997). ISBN 978-0415916943
- Social Control and the Arts: An International Perspective, editor with Susan R. Suleiman, Alice Jardine and Ruth Perry (Cambridge: New Cambridge Press, 1990)

=== Selected essays ===
- “Reckoning with Relevance: Collaboration, Community, Context,” Shakespeare and the Poetics and Politics of Relevance, eds, Dympna Callaghan and Soogie Chiari (Palgrave, 2024)
- ”What the Future Holds: Shakespearean Futures, Now and Then,” Histories of the Future: On Shakespeare and Thinking Ahead, ed. Carla Mazzio (Philadelphia, University of Pennsylvania Press, 2024)
- “Circling the Square: Geometry, Masculinity and the Norms of Antony and Cleopatra,” Staging Normality in Shakespeare’s England, eds. Rory Loughnane & Edel Semple (Shakespeare Studies Series, London: Palgrave, 2019).
- "Scepticism and the Spectacular: On Shakespeare in an Age of Science," Spectacular Science, Technology and Superstition in the Age of Shakespeare," eds. Sophie Chiari and Mickael Popelard (Edinburgh University Press, 2017).
- *"Writing in the Aftermath: Digital Humanities, c. 1600?" in Numbers in Early Modern Writing, Special Issue of Journal of the Northern Renaissance, 6 (2015).
- *"The Invisible Element in Art: Dürer, Shakespeare, Donne," in Vision and its Instruments: Art, Science, and Technology in Early Modern Europe, ed. Alina Payne (Philadelphia: Penn State University Press, 2015).
- *"Shakespeare and Science," Introduction, Shakespeare & Science, South Central Review 26.1 & 26.2 (Winter & Spring, 2009): 1-23.
- "A History of Air: Hamlet and the Trouble with Instruments," Shakespeare & Science, South Central Review, Special Double Issue, 26.1 & 26.2 (Winter & Spring, 2009): 153-98.
- "Anatomy of a Ghost: History as Hypothesis," Literature Compass 3.1 (January 2006): 17-31. Invited Essay Response to "Shakespeare and Embodiment" in previous issue.
- "The Senses Divided: Organs, Objects & Media in Early Modern England," Empire of the Senses: The Sensual Culture Reader, ed. David Howes (Oxford: Berg, 2005), 85-105.
- "The Three-Dimensional Self: Geometry, Melancholy, Drama," Arts of Calculation, eds. David Glimp and Michelle R. Warren (NY: Palgrave, 2004), 39-65.
- "Acting with Tact: Touch and Theater in the English Renaissance," Sensible Flesh: On Touch in Early Modern Culture, ed. Elizabeth Harvey (Univ. of Pennsylvania, 2003), 159-186.
- "The Melancholy of Print: Love’s Labour’s Lost," Historicism, Psychoanalysis, and Early Modern Culture (New York: Routledge, 2000), 186-227.
- "Dreams of History," with Douglas Trevor, Introduction to Historicism, Psychoanalysis, and Early Modern Culture (2000).
- "Staging the Vernacular: Language and Nation in Thomas Kyd’s The Spanish Tragedy," Studies in English Literature, 38 (Spring 1998) 2: 207-232.
- "Individual Parts," with David Hillman, Introduction to The Body in Parts (1997).
- "Sins of the Tongue," The Body in Parts (New York: Routledge, 1997), 53-79.
- Reprint: "Sins of the Tongue in Early Modern England" Modern Language Studies 28. 4 (Autumn 1998): 93-124.

=== Other ===
- Script Editor, Underwater Dreams (2014 Documentary)

== Awards ==
- John Simon Guggenheim Memorial Fellowship in the Humanities, 2014-2015.
- Roland H. Bainton Book Prize for Literature for The Inarticulate Renaissance, 2010.
- English Association Beatrice White Book Prize for The Body in Parts, 1999.
- Hudson Strode Program in Renaissance Studies, selected as one of the top Renaissance Scholars in the world under 40, 2004.
- National Endowment for the Humanities, 2004-2005.
- Northeast Modern Language Association Graduate Caucus Essay Prize, 1996
- Helen Choate Bell Prize for Best Essay in American Literature, Harvard University, 1993.
- Four Derek Bok Prizes for Excellence in Teaching at Harvard University, 1993-1997.
