= Lori Nix =

American photographer (born 1969)

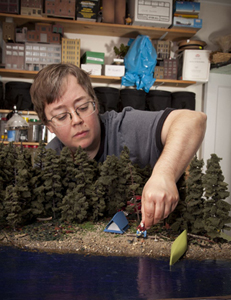
- Born: 1969 (age 56–57); Norton, Kansas
- Known for: Sculpture, Photography
- Awards: Guggenheim Fellowship

Lori Nix (born 1969) is an American photographer known for her photographs of handmade dioramas.

== Early life ==
Lori Nix was born in Norton, Kansas in 1969. She graduated from Truman State University in 1993. She went on to study photography at the graduate level at Ohio University, and moved to Brooklyn, New York in 1999, where she has lived and worked for almost 20 years.

== Artistic practice ==
Nix considers herself a "faux landscape photographer", and her work is influenced by extreme weather and disaster films. She works without digital manipulation, using miniatures and models to create surreal scenes and landscapes, building dioramas that range from 20 inches to six feet in diameter. They take several months to build, and two to three weeks to photograph. For many years Nix used a large format 8 × 10 film camera but in 2015 she started photographing her dioramas with a digital camera. Nix works with Kathleen Gerber, a trained glass artist, constructing most of the scenery by hand from scratch, using "foam and glue and paint and anything else handy." After the final photograph is made, Nix harvests the diorama for pieces for future use and then destroys it.

== Major projects ==
=== Photography ===
- Empire, 2015–2018. This series is primarily concerned with the exterior spaces of urban structures and landscapes. The detailed photographs show the case of a modern empire after an inexplicable catastrophe: deserted places and half-decayed architectures that are slowly being recaptured by flora and fauna.
- The City, 2005–2013. A post-apocalyptic vision wherein Nix explores what it would be like to be one of the last remaining people living in a city, imagining indoor urban scenes.
- Lost, 2003–2004. Nix "subverts the traditions of landscape photography to create her own humorously dark world", examining feelings of isolation and loneliness.
- Some Other Place, 2000–2002. Made after Nix moved to New York in 1999, featured neighborhood sidewalks, city parks, and forays into the wilderness.
- Unnatural History, 2009. A series of tiny dioramas of rooms in imaginary museums, partly inspired by New York's American Museum of Natural History.
- Accidentally Kansas, 1998–2000. Tornadoes, floods, insect infestations, and other bizarre events that featured during her childhood in the American Midwest.

=== Video ===
- A City Severed, 2012. A short film that recreates the 1863 New York City draft riots in miniature, produced with Four Story Treehouse.
- The Story of Sushi, 2012. A short film about sustainable sushi in miniature, produced with Four Story Treehouse.

== Publications ==
- Contact Sheet 117: The Light Work Annual. Light Work, 2002.
- Contact Sheet 119 Lori Nix: Waiting to Happen, Light Work. Light Work, 2002
- Lori Nix: The City. Decode Books, 2013. With an essay by Barbara Pollack.
- Lori Nix. The Power of Nature. Wienand, 2015. ISBN 978-3-86832-274-3.

== Solo exhibitions ==
- 2018: Empire, Galerie Klüser.
- 2017: Empire, ClampArt.
- 2016: Lori Nix: The City, Nerman Museum of Contemporary Art, Kansas.
- 2016: Lost, Galerie Klüser, Munich.
- 2015: The Power of Nature, Museum Schloss Moyland, Bedburg-Hau.
- 2015: Imagined Worlds, Large and Small, Hillstrom Museum of Art, Gustavus Adolphus College.
- 2014: The City, Galerie Klüser.
- 2013: The City, G. Gibson Gallery.
- 2013: More Photographs From The City, ClampArt.
- 2013: Unnatural History, Drexel University's Art of Science Gallery.
- 2012: The City, Bau-Xi Gallery, West Toronto, ON, Canada.
- 2012: The City, Museum of Art, University of Maine, Bangor, Maine.
- 2012: The City, Hamilton Gallery, Salve Regina University, Newport, Rhode Island.
- 2011: Unnatural History and The City, CEPA Gallery, Rochester, New York.
- 2011: The City, Catherine Edelman Gallery.
- 2011: The City, Flippo Gallery, Randolph-Macon College, Ashland, Virginia.
- 2010: The City, ClampArt.

== Collections ==
- Smithsonian American Art Museum, Washington, DC.
- Museum of Fine Arts, Houston, Texas.
- George Eastman House, Rochester, New York.
- Spencer Museum of Art, University of Kansas, Lawrence, Kansas.

== Awards ==
- 2014: Guggenheim Fellowship in the US & Canada Competition for Creative Arts – Photography.
