= Emily Talen =

American urban theorist

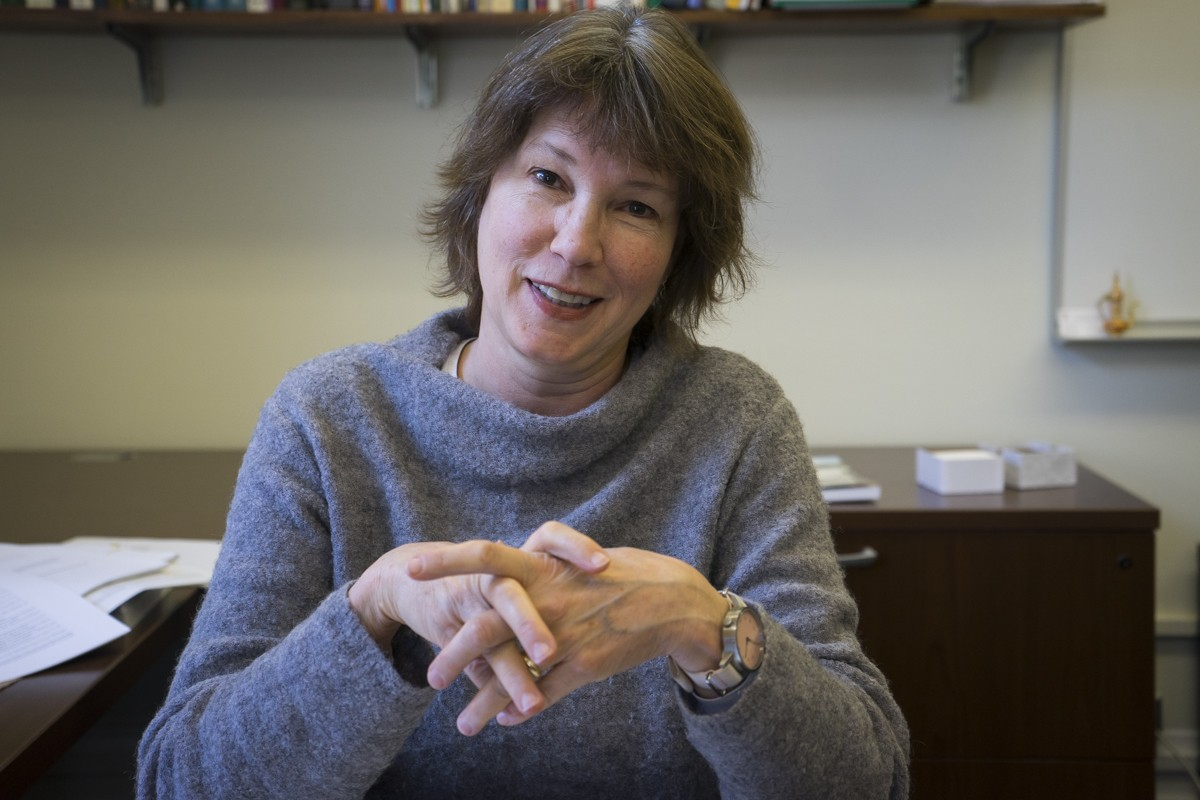
- Emily Talen, 2016
- Occupations: Urban designer, Urban theorist
- Title: Professor of Urbanism, Division of Social Sciences, University of Chicago

Academic background
- Education: Calvin College (B.A.); Ohio State University (M.C.R.P.); University of California, Santa Barbara (Ph.D.)
- Thesis: The achievement of planning goals: A methodology for evaluating the success of plans (1995)
- Doctoral advisor: Helen Couclelis, Michael Frank Goodchild, Reginald Golledge, Lewis Hopkins

Emily Talen is professor of urbanism at the University of Chicago. Her research is devoted to urban design and the relationship between the built environment and social equity. She is the recipient of a Guggenheim Fellowship (2014–15), and is a Fellow of the American Institute of Certified Planners. Her work has attracted close to 15,000 citations listed on Google Scholar.

== Education ==
Talen received a PhD in urban geography from the University of California, Santa Barbara. She also possesses a master's degree in city and regional planning from Ohio State University. Previously, she was a faculty member in the Department of Urban and Regional Planning at the University of Illinois at Urbana-Champaign and in the School of Geographical Sciences and Urban Planning at Arizona State University. Prior to entering academia, she worked as a professional planner in Santa Barbara and Columbus, Ohio.

== Books ==
Her books include New Urbanism and American Planning: The Conflict of Cultures, Design for Diversity: Exploring Socially Mixed Neighborhoods, Urban Design Reclaimed: Tools, Techniques, and Strategies for Planners, and City Rules: How Regulations Affect Urban Form. Her most recent book is Neighborhood (Oxford University Press). She is also the editor of several volumes, the most recent of which is Retrofitting Sprawl: Addressing 70 Years of Failed Urban Form.
