= Robert Hite (artist) =

American visual artist (1956–2020)

- Born: 2 August 1956; Richmond, Virginia, U.S.
- Died: 27 May 2020 (aged 63)
- Education: Virginia Commonwealth University, Corcoran School of Art
- Known for: Visual art

Robert Hite (1956–2020) was an American visual artist. Hite was born in Richmond, Virginia, and lived and worked in Esopus, New York. Robert Hite was inspired both by a rich Southern narrative tradition and closeness to nature. The imagery in his work draws upon the memories of his childhood in rural Virginia during the Civil Rights Movement era. Hite's work explored issues of local knowledge, memory, transience, environment, disenfranchisement and domicile as living art. Much of his photographic work juxtaposes the artificial and the natural and play with architectural scale. In April 2014, Hite was named as a Guggenheim Fellow for his work in fine arts.

== Education ==
Hite attended Virginia Commonwealth University (in Richmond, Virginia), and the Corcoran School of Art. Hite worked as a studio assistant to painter Leon Berkowitz.

== Work ==
Hite's work, blending painting, sculpture, and photography, concentrates on narrative forms. His work is grounded in the rural landscape and iconography of his childhood in Virginia. His paintings have been compared to Eugène Delacroix and Albert Pinkham Ryder. Since 2006, his work increased in its use of mixed-media culminating in the show Imagined Histories. In this series, Hite takes photographs of model houses that he situates in natural settings.

== Awards ==
- 2017 ((Albany Airport)) Large scale commission
- 2016 MASS MoCA Residency
- 2014 Guggenheim Fellowship

== Exhibitions ==
- 2019 11 Jane Street Art Center, Saugerties, NY ( solo ) " In the Shallows "
- 2018-2019 Coral Gables Museum, Coral Gables, Florida Castles in the Sky
- 2018 Lehman College, Bronx, Ny Castles in the Sky
- 2018 Carrie Haddad Fine Art, A Distant Embrace, Hudson, Ny
- 2017-2020 Migration House, Sculpture, Albany Airport, Albany Airport ( large scale commission)
- 2017-2018 Above the Fray, concourse a. Solo ((Albany Airport)), Albany Airport, NY
- 2017 A Distant Embrace, Rockland Center for the Arts, Nyack, NY (solo)
- 2017 Collarworks Gallery, Troy, NY
- 2016 Living On Earth, Berkshire Museum, Pittsfield, Hancock MA (solo)
- 2016 Living On Earth, Hancock Shaker Village Museum, Hancock, MA (solo)
- 2016 Interior-Exterior, Wired Gallery, High Falls, NY (solo)
- 2015 Out of the Vault, Nassau County Museum of Art, Roslyn, NY
- 2015 Carrie Haddad Gallery, Hudson, NY
- 2014 Clermont State Historic Site, Germantown, NY (solo)
- 2014 Architecture Digested, El Camino College, Torrence, CA
- 2013 Fire House Gallery, Nassau Community College, Garden City, NY (solo)
- 2013 Wired Gallery, High Falls, NY (solo)
- 2013 Pulse New York, New York, NY
- 2012 Montgomery Row, Rhinebeck, NY (solo)
- 2011 Axelle Fine Arts, New York, NY (two person)
- 2011 Art Miami, Miami, FL
- 2011 Nassau County Museum of Art, Roslyn, NY (solo)
- 2010 St. Edward's University, Austin, Texas (solo w/ teaching and public talk)
- 2009 G.A.S. Gallery, Poughkeepsie, NY
- 2009 Heading Home, Susan Eley Fine Arts, New York, NY
- 2008 Living On Earth, Pearl Arts Gallery, Stone Ridge, NY (solo)
- 2008 Espacio En Blanco, Madrid, Spain
- 2008 Colorblind, Cardwell Jimmerson, Culver City, California
- 2008 The Aspen Gallery, Aspen, CO
- 2008 Violet Ray Gallery, New York, NY
- 2007 “Imagined Histories” Paintings, Sculpture and Photographs, Lascano Gallery, Great Barrington, NY (solo)
- 2007 Pearl Arts Gallery, Stone Ridge, NY
- 2005 Kingston Sculpture Biennial, Kingston, NY
- 2005 The Maquette Show, Arts Society of Kingston, Kingston, NY
- 2003 Co-curator: Light Among Shadows, Absolute/L.A. International, 6th Biennial Art Exhibition
- 2003 Palmer Gallery, Vassar College, Poughkeepsie, NY (solo)
- 2003 Social Science Research Council, New York, NY (solo)
- 2003 18th Street Arts Complex, Santa Monica, CA
- 2003 Hudson River Art at Rhinebeck, Wilderstein Historic Site, Rhinebeck, NY
- 2002 Ellen Elizabeth Gallery, Cape Cod, MA (solo)
- 2002 Tree of Remembrance and Book of Names, American University, Washington College of Law, Washington D.C. (solo)
- 2002 Curator: Light Among Shadows, Resource Center of the Americas, Minneapolis, MN
- 2001 Light Among Shadows, Ann Loeb Bronfman Gallery, Washington, D.C.
- 2000 Columbia University, Rotunda, New York, NY
- 2000 Watkins Gallery, American University, Washington, DC
- 2000 Forum Gallery, New York, NY
- 2000 The Tartt Gallery, Washington, DC (solo)
- 2000 Fredericksburg Center for the Creative Arts, Fredericksburg, VA (solo)
- 2000 Foxley Leach Gallery, Washington, DC (solo)
