= The Living New Deal =

Digital history project

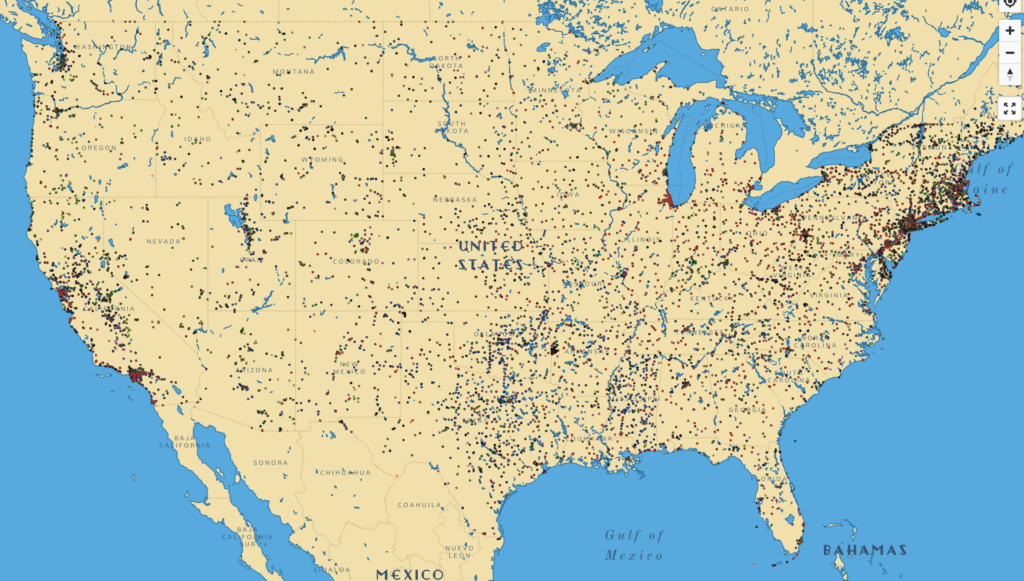
A picture of the Living New Deal's interactive map, highlighting New Deal sites, structures, and works of art.

The Living New Deal is a research project and online public archive documenting the scope and impact of the New Deal on American lives and the national landscape. The project focuses on public works programs, which put millions of unemployed to work, saved families from destitution, and renovated the infrastructure of the United States.

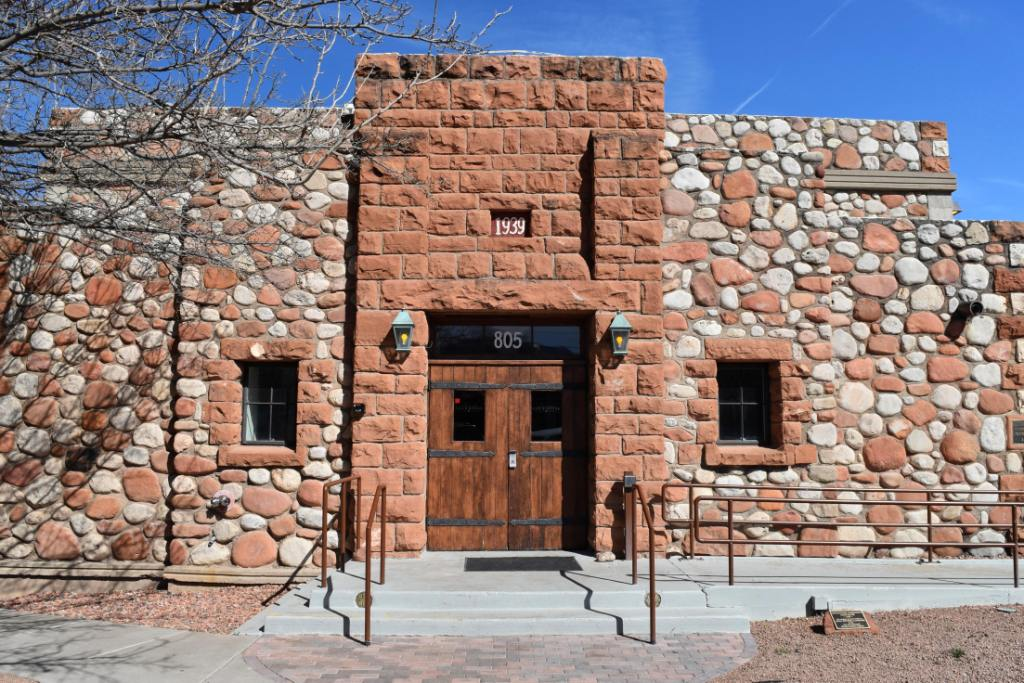
The WPA built this Community Club House in Cottonwood, Arizona, 1938-1939.

The centerpiece of the Living New Deal is a website that catalogs and maps the location of public works projects and artworks created from 1933 to 1943 under the aegis of the federal government during the administration of President Franklin D. Roosevelt.

== Purpose ==
The New Deal was a combination of economic stimulus policies and social programs created to lift America out of the Great Depression, intended for all regions within the country, it reached deep into rural areas with its conservation work. Most New Deal public works - such as schools, roads, dams, waterworks, and hospitals - continued to function for decades, with many still extant today. Yet, there is no national record of what the New Deal built, only occasionally noted in local and national archives, published sources, and plaques and markers. This represents an enormous gap in the historic record surrounding the New Deal. The Living New Deal's goal is to uncover every New Deal public works site in all fifty states and build a public archive of photographs, documents, films, and stories from the pivotal period. As of early 2023, the project has found around 18,000 documented New Deal sites.

This online catalog identifies thousands of New Deal sites and pinpoints them on an interactive map. Sites can be searched by name, city, state, category, and agency. The website and its growing database show the vast imprint the New Deal had across the nation. The Living New Deal website was selected as one of the 10 best new sites on the web for 2014 by Slate Magazine, and has been mentioned in the Boston Globe, Vox, the San Francisco Chronicle, and other news outlets. In November 2022, PBS NewsHour featured a story on the Living New Deal.

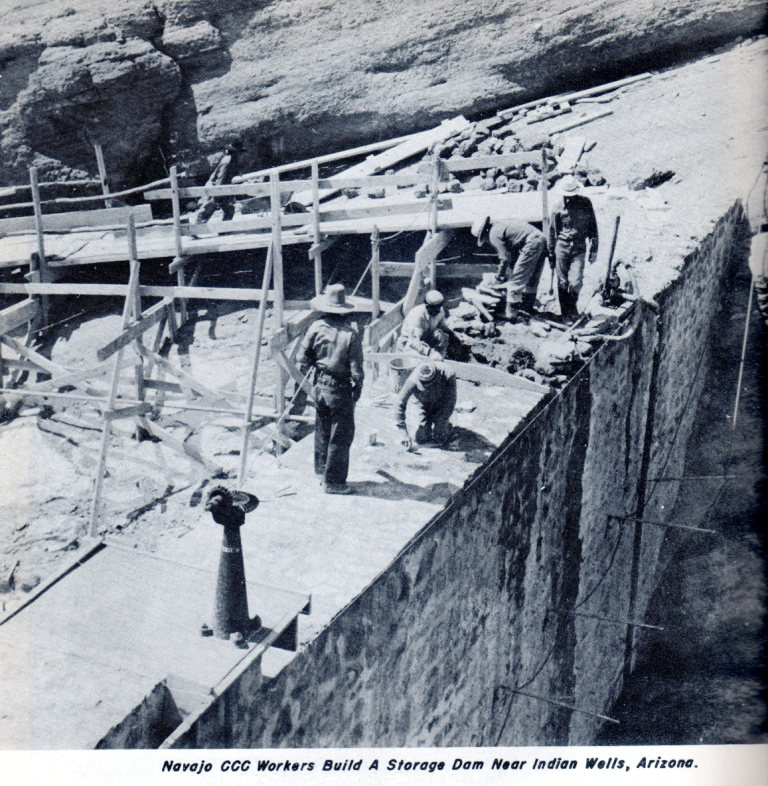
Navajo Indians in the Civilian Conservation Corps, Indian Wells, Arizona, 1941. 85,000 American Indians served in the CCC, working on roads, forestry, soil and water conservation, and more.

In addition to the online archive, the Living New Deal works to highlight the legacy of the New Deal by:

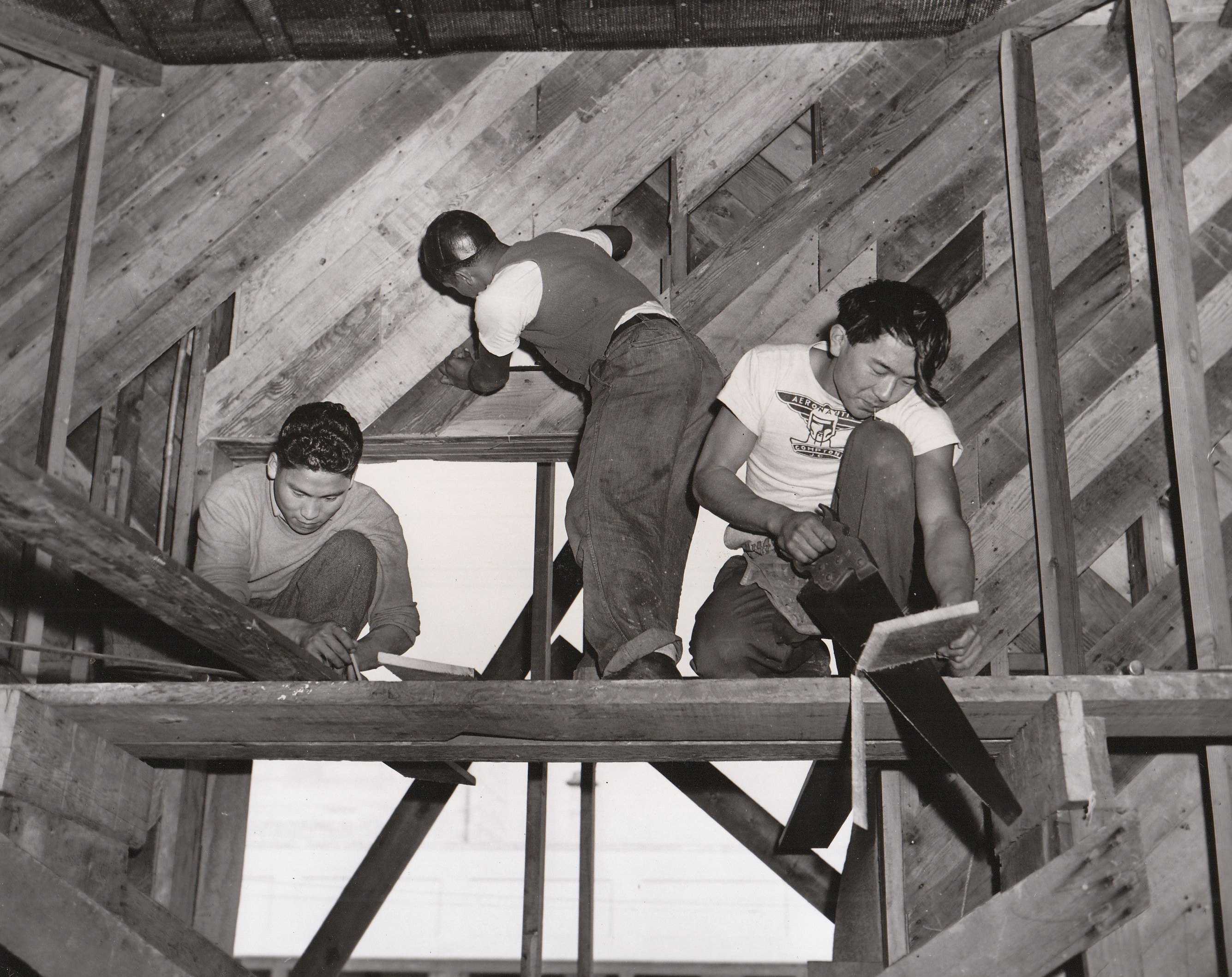
Workers in the National Youth Administration, building a Student Union Building at Compton Junior College, Los Angeles, ca. 1939.

- Acting as a clearinghouse for news and discussion
- Gathering stories of families whose lives were touched by the New Deal
- Engaging the public to protect New Deal public works sites from neglect and destruction.
- Publishing a newsletter, The Fireside
- Creating teaching aids about the New Deal and its legacy, including the public television-produced app 'Lets Get Lost' on New Deal Murals
- Compiling bibliographies and web links to sources of information about the New Deal
- Creating a New Deal online film archive
- Publishing pocket maps of New Deal sites in key cities, such as San Francisco, New York, and Washington, D.C.
- Sponsoring New Deal tours, lectures, conferences, film series, and other events
- Writing summaries of New Deal programs and biographies of leading New Dealers
- Envisioning a national New Deal museum to record and celebrate the achievements of the era
- Sharing images and information on social media

The ultimate aim of the Living New Deal is to educate the general public, civic leaders and politicians about the New Deal and to show that it provides a proven model for reviving the economy in hard times, dealing with unemployment (especially among youth), rebuilding communities all across the country, restoring faith in government and renewing a sense of national purpose. In a time when so many people and places are hurting for good jobs and economic renewal, and the infrastructure of the country is crumbling, the New Deal can serve as a model for good government policy in the present day.

== Organization ==
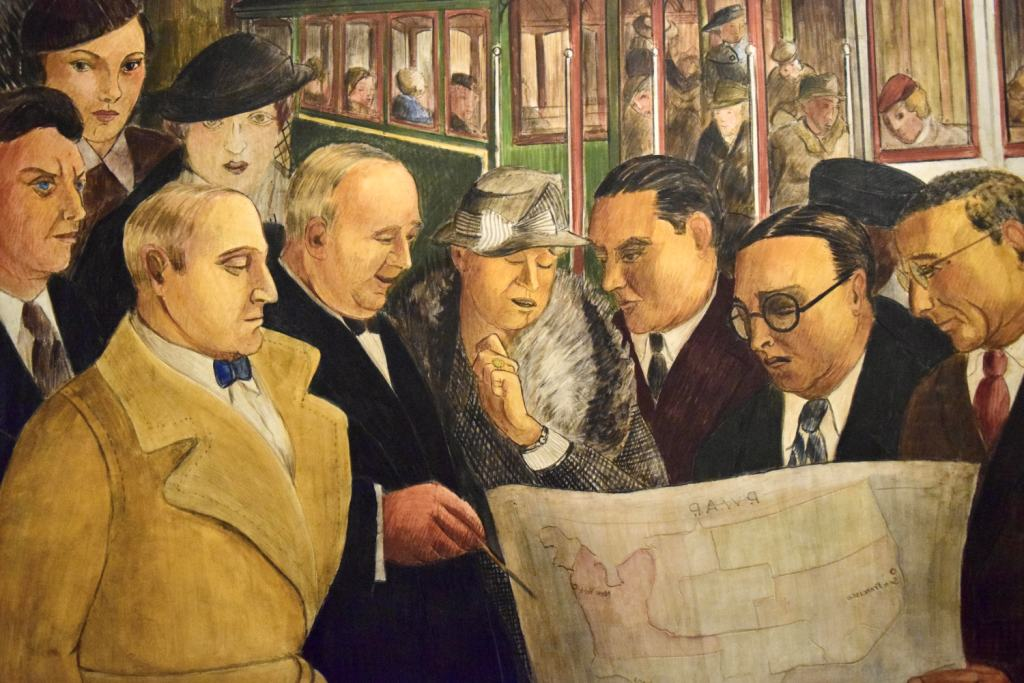
Portion of Coit Tower mural (San Francisco), by Lucian Labaudt, featuring Eleanor Roosevelt. Created in the New Deal's Public Works of Art Project, 1934.

The Living New Deal is a California non-profit corporation based in the San Francisco Bay Area and affiliated with the Department of Geography at the University of California, Berkeley. The Living New Deal is directed by UCB Professor Emeritus Richard Walker. Its founder and project scholar is Gray Brechin. The core operation is run by a team of a dozen people across the country. Its national advisory and research boards are made up of scholars such as New Deal historians William Leuchtenburg and Ira Katznelson, former Labor Secretary Robert Reich and former Council of Economic Advisors Chair Christina Romer, and members of the Roosevelt family.

The Living New Deal relies on a network of national associates and other volunteers, including historians, teachers, students, artists, history buffs, librarians, journalists, and photographers to document New Deal sites throughout the U.S. They upload their discoveries, such as photographs, historic documents, news articles, and commentary to the Living New Deal's website, for example, the site submission page or via an iOS app. The information is verified by research assistants before being published. The Living New Deal is a crowdsourced project that invites anyone to volunteer and sign up as a research associate.

== History ==
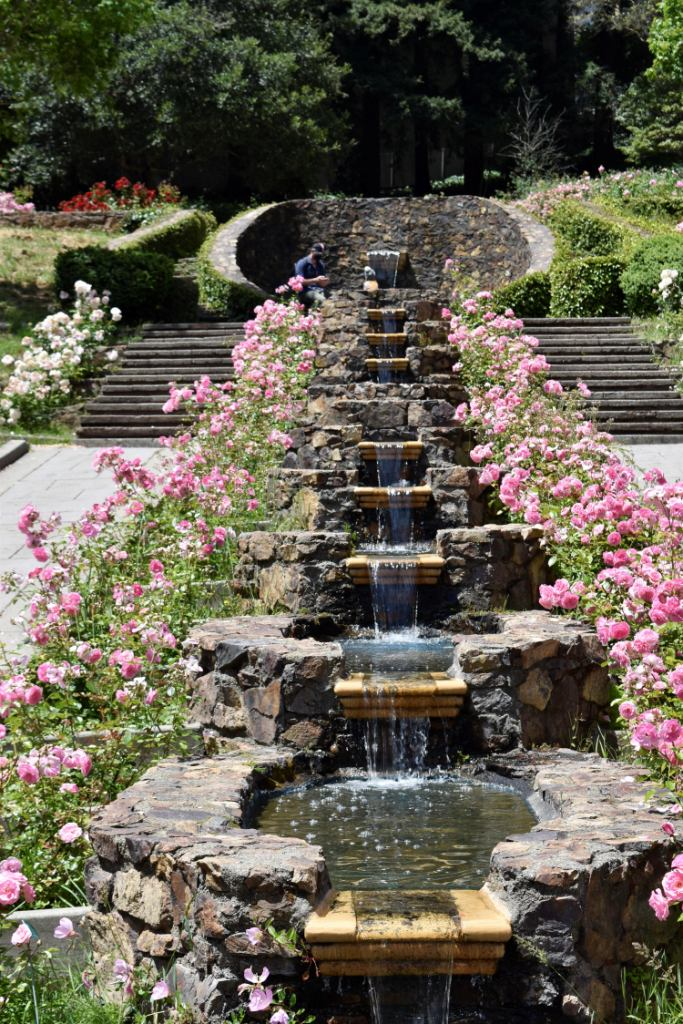
Cascade in the Morcom Amphitheater of Roses, Oakland, California. The garden was completed by the New Deal's Federal Emergency Relief Administration in 1934-1935.

The Living New Deal began as an idea for a book by Gray Brechin in 2002, but the concept quickly proved too ambitious for a single researcher. A research project directed by Richard Walker was launched as the California Living New Deal in 2007, sponsored by the Institute for Research on Labor and Employment at the University of California, Berkeley, and the California Historical Society, with support from the Columbia Foundation.

In 2010, the project moved to the Department of Geography at UC Berkeley and became national in scope. In 2012, the Living New Deal hired its first project manager and began to assemble a part-time staff to complement its volunteers. Over time, the staff has grown, adding a communications director, project historian, development director, and assistant director, as well as a New York City chapter director. The number of national associates increased as well, reaching 55 by 2022, with the help of a volunteer coordinator added to staff in 2019.

The year 2011 was also a turning point for the online presentation of the Living New Deal, with a permanent webmaster added to the staff by 2013. The number of New Deal sites mapped expanded rapidly over the next decade, from 5,000 in 2013 to 17,000 in 2022.

The Living New Deal has undertaken many new projects over the years. It published the first print map and guide to a major city in 2014 (San Francisco), followed by New York City (2017) and Washington, D.C. (2021); a major effort to map New Deal Los Angeles began in 2022. A New York City chapter was launched in 2018 and a teaching project in DC schools in 2022, which led to the a national teaching project in 2023. A project on preserving New Deal art also commenced in 2023.

The Living New Deal website topped a million annual visits by 2018, two million by 2020 and three million by 2022. The volume of traffic and material included in the website led to a complete overhaul of the website, which went public in 2023.

A full narrative history of the Living New Deal project can be found on the website.

== New Deal's legacy of public works ==
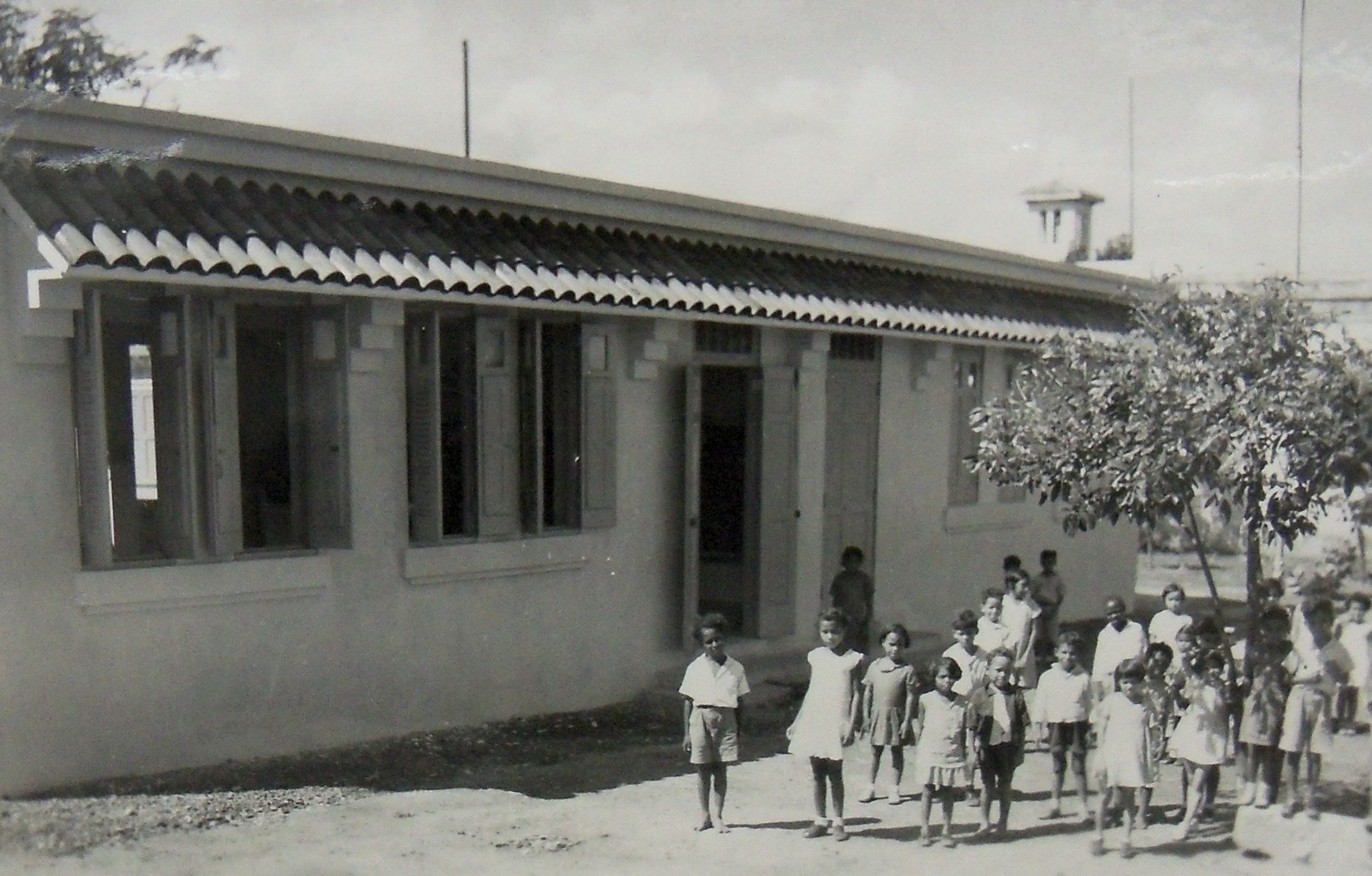
A new school in Ceiba, Puerto Rico, constructed by the New Deal's Puerto Rico Reconstruction Administration, ca. 1938.

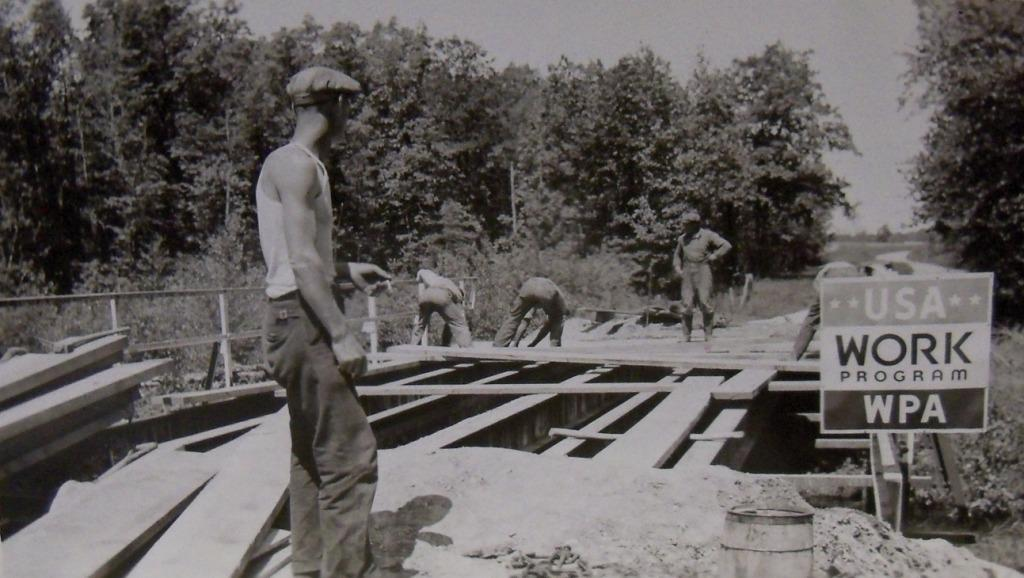
WPA bridge project, Prince George's County, Maryland, 1936.

When President Franklin D. Roosevelt took office in 1933, America was in the depths of the Great Depression. The stock market crash of 1929 led the implosion and the downturn continued for over three years as thousands of banks and businesses failed and millions of people lost their life savings, farms, and homes. At its worst, one-quarter of the U.S. workforce was unemployed and national output had fallen by one-third.

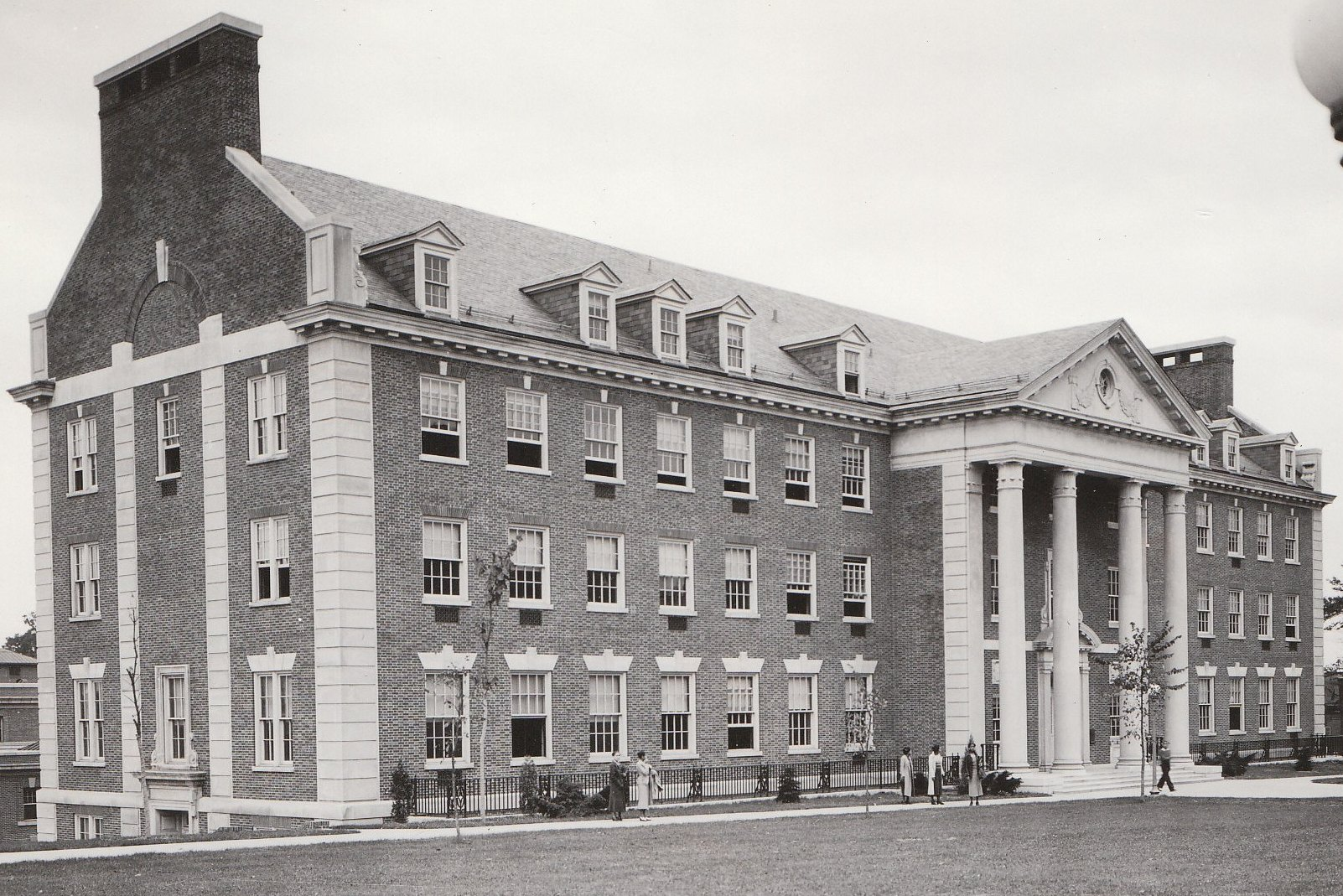
PWA-financed Chemistry Building, Howard University, historically-Black college, Washington, D.C., 1936.

To address the economic collapse and resulting human suffering, President Roosevelt declared a "new deal for the American people". Within days of his inauguration, he had launched the New Deal, an innovative constellation of federal programs aimed at restoring financial stability, stabilizing industry and agriculture, increasing relief efforts, and employing millions of desperate workers. The economy began a rapid revival from 1933 to 1942, marred by a sharp recession in 1937. National output recovered to pre-Depression levels just before the outbreak of World War II, which absorbed the last of the mass unemployment of the era.

The New Deal transformed American government and reformed American society in several important respects, such as reining in Wall Street, supporting home ownership, and introducing Social Security. But the visible hallmark of the New Deal was its vast array of public works, which put millions of people back to work and put much-needed funds into the hands of impoverished families and straitened communities. These were much more than "make work" programs, as they are often portrayed; New Deal public works dramatically overhauled the nation's infrastructure, refashioned the American landscape, and modernized cities, towns, and rural areas across the country.

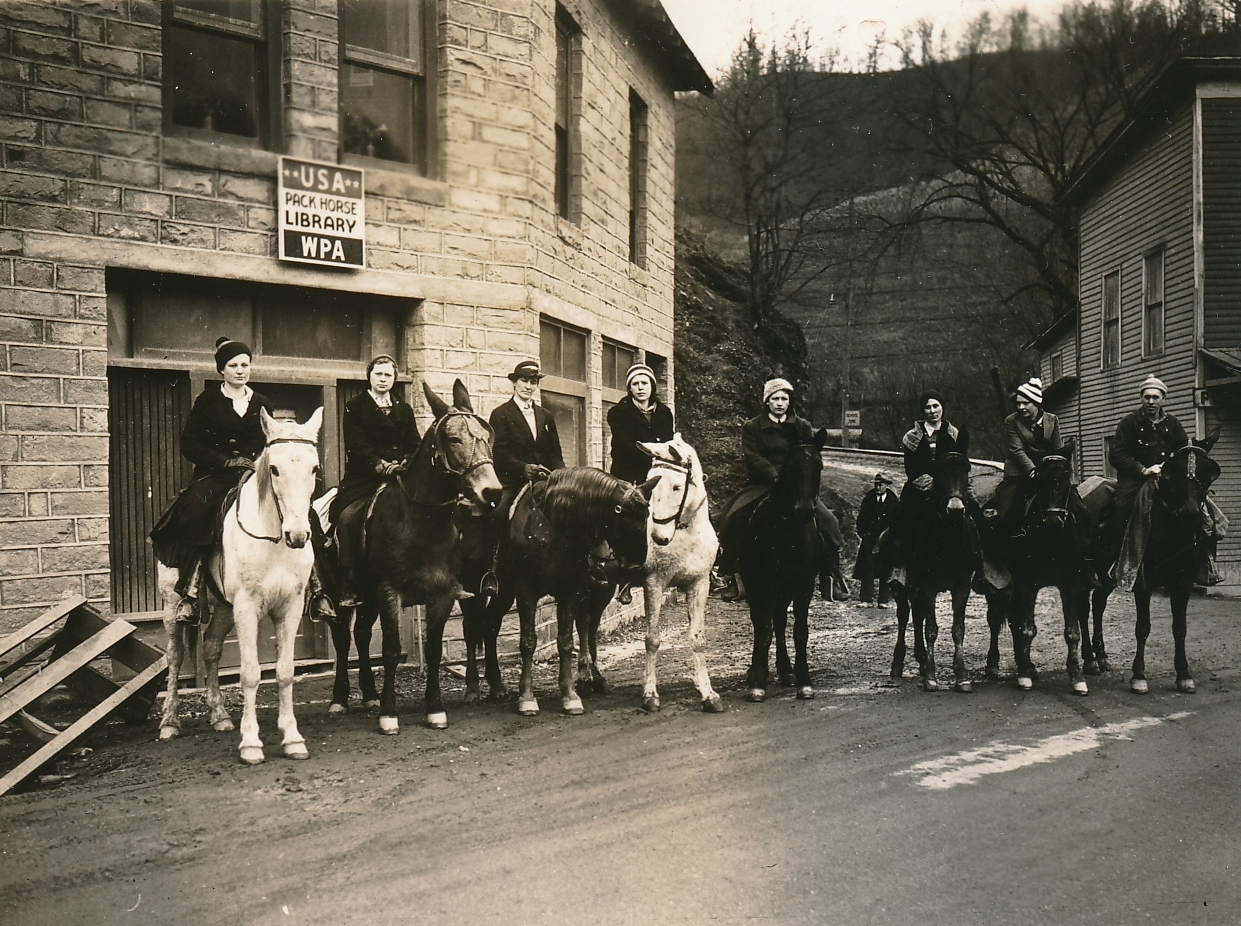
Millions of women were employed in New Deal work programs, in jobs related to historic preservation, museum services, healthcare, sewing, performing arts, food services, music, libraries, and more.

The most famous of the so-called "alphabet soup" of New Deal public works agencies were the Public Works Administration (PWA), the Works Progress Administration (WPA), the Civilian Conservation Corps (CCC), the Tennessee Valley Authority (TVA), and the Federal Art Project (FAP) within the WPA. But the administration also made huge investments in older agencies, such as the Treasury Department (Post Offices and the Treasury Section of Fine Arts), the Bureau of Reclamation, and the Bureau of Public Roads. Other significant agencies included the Civil Works Administration (CWA), Rural Electrification Administration (REA), National Youth Administration (NYA), Puerto Rico Reconstruction Administration (PRRA), Resettlement/Farm Security Administration (RA/FSA), Soil Conservation Service (SCS), and Bonneville Power Administration (BPA). With the Living New Deal's open-source database and map, the cumulative impact of these public works can be displayed for the first time.

In less than ten years, the New Deal public works programs built and expanded a modern infrastructure that Americans still depend on, but that few are aware of. Every day people use roads, schools, auditoriums, parks, sewers, tunnels, sidewalks, forests, trails, and more without realizing these are the result of an all-out-effort by the Federal government, in alliance with state and local governments, to put people to work during hard times. Some historians have argued that these public works were the foundation for the health and prosperity of the nation for generations afterward.

Because of the swiftness with which the New Deal sprang into action and the huge scale and scope of its efforts, a great many of its accomplishments went unrecorded. Although the New Deal public works agencies built tens of thousands of public buildings—post offices, airports, hospitals, museums, colleges, universities, and government buildings—most of what was created remains unmarked. Moreover, in the post-war years, a concerted effort by the New Deal's critics to erase its memory destroyed many identifying markers on New Deal-era buildings and removed public artwork commissioned by the FAP and Treasury Department. In recent years, supporters of the New Deal have actively campaigned to place new signage on buildings to report their New Deal origins. The Living New Deal's New York City chapter worked for several years with the NYC Parks Department and succeeded in getting new signage on New Deal-funded pools.
