= 1980 Damascus Titan missile explosion =

Explosion of a US ICBM in Arkansas

- U.S. National Register of Historic Places
- Location within the United States Location within Arkansas
- Coordinates: 35°24′50″N 92°23′49″W
- NRHP reference No.: 98001434
- Added to NRHP: February 18, 2000

The Damascus Titan missile explosion (also called the Damascus accident) was a 1980 U.S. nuclear weapons incident involving a U.S. Air Force LGM-25C Titan II intercontinental ballistic missile (ICBM) at Missile Complex 374-7 in rural Arkansas. The incident began with a fuel leak at 6:30 p.m. CDT on September 18, and culminated with an explosion inside the missile silo at around 3:00 a.m. on September 19. The 9-megaton-of-TNT (38 PJ) W-53 nuclear warhead was ejected and landed a short distance away and no radioactive material was lost.

== Launch complex ==
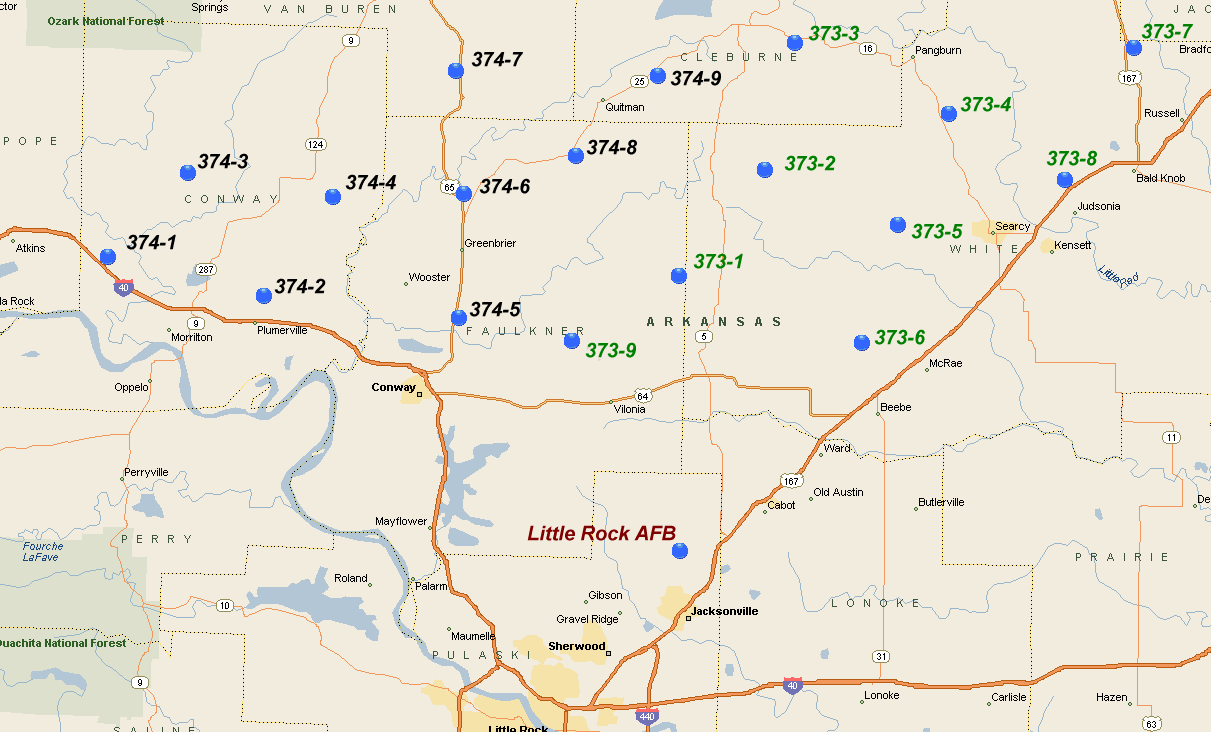
Strategic Missile (SM) sites of 373rd and 374th Strategic Missile Squadrons, reporting to the 308th Strategic Missile Wing.

Launch Complex 374-7 was located in Bradley Township, Van Buren County farmland just 3.5 miles (5.6 km) NNE of Damascus and approximately 50 miles (80 km) north of Little Rock.

The Strategic Air Command facility of Little Rock Air Force Base was one of eighteen silos in the command of the 308th Strategic Missile Wing (308th SMW), specifically one of the nine silos within its 374th Strategic Missile Squadron (374th SMS), at the time of the explosion.

== Incident ==
=== Leadup ===
At around 6:30 p.m. CDT on Thursday, September 18, 1980, two airmen from a Propellant Transfer System (PTS) team were checking the pressure on the oxidizer tank of a USAF Titan II missile at Little Rock AFB's Launch Complex 374-7. One of the workers, Airman David P. Powell, had brought a ratchet wrench – 3 ft (0.9 m) long weighing 25 lb (11 kg) – into the silo instead of a torque wrench, the latter having been newly mandated by Air Force regulations.

Powell later claimed that he was already below ground in his safety suit when he realized he had brought the wrong wrench, so he chose to continue rather than turn back. The 3-1/8" socket weighing 8 lbs (3.6 kg) fell off the ratchet and dropped approximately 80 feet (24 m) before bouncing off a thrust mount and piercing the missile's skin over the first-stage fuel tank, causing it to leak a cloud of its Aerozine 50 fuel.

Aerozine 50 is hypergolic with the Titan II's oxidizer, dinitrogen tetroxide, such that they spontaneously ignite upon contact with each other. The nitrogen tetroxide is kept in a second tank in the rocket's first stage, directly above the fuel tank and below the second stage and its nine-megaton W-53 nuclear warhead.

Eventually, the missile combat crew and the PTS team evacuated the launch control center, while military and civilian response teams arrived to tackle the hazardous situation. Lieutenant General Lloyd R. Leavitt Jr., the Vice Commander of the Strategic Air Command, commanded the effort to save the launch complex. There was concern for the possible collapse of the now-empty first-stage fuel tank, which could cause the rest of the 8-story missile to fall and rupture, allowing the oxidizer to contact the fuel already in the silo.

=== Explosion ===
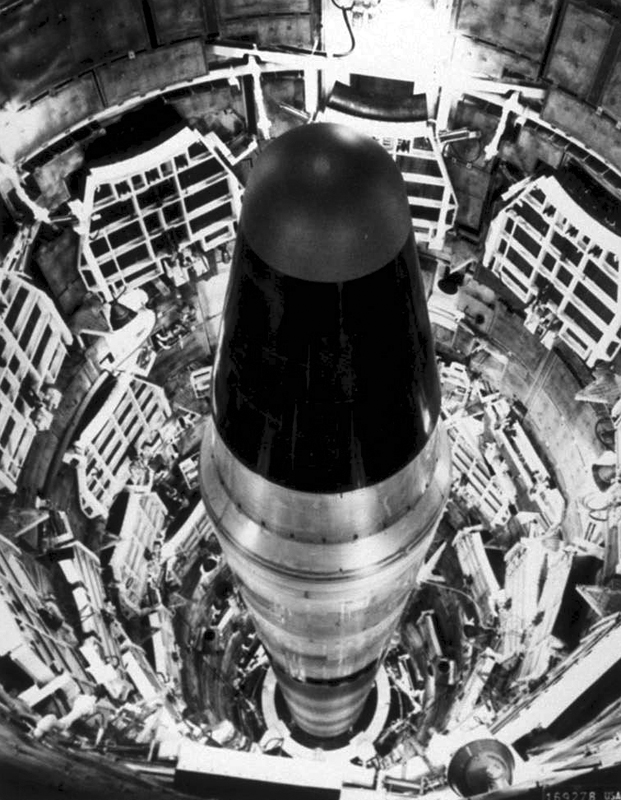
A Titan II ICBM in its launch silo

Early in the morning of September 19, after the Titan II missile fuel tank had been leaking for nearly 6 hours, the first men to enter the silo complex were Senior Airmen John "Greg" Devlin and his partner, Rex Hukle. Since the on-site command team had been evacuated, no one was inside to electronically unlock the entry gate or open the portal entry door for them. Devlin and Hukle were thus instructed to cut through the security fence next to the entry gate using 3-foot-long bolt cutters. Then they proceeded across the complex to the underground entry portal, descended 15 steps, and used a standard length crowbar and the bolt cutters to break through the steel-framed portal door.

Once inside, they encountered a locked, caged-in area, typically used to provide the top-secret codes for entry to the commander. They had to break through the locked door manually. After descending the stairwell approximately 35 feet, they encountered the first of two blast doors (Door #6), which is used to enter the blast lock area. This area housed the Vapor Detector Annunciator Panel (VDAP), which they were trying to access. Devlin and Hukle hooked up a manual, hydraulic pump to the locking pin cylinder, in hopes of retracting the pin for entry. Within minutes, they were running low on breathing air in their RFHCO (Rocket Fuel Handler Clothing Outfits) suits and were ordered to return topside.

Devlin and Hukle had been relieved by Senior Airman David Lee Livingston and Sergeant Jeff K. Kennedy, who proceeded past the opened security gate and unlocked portal doors, arriving at Door #6. Because their vapor detectors indicated an explosive atmosphere, the two were ordered to evacuate. The team was then ordered to reenter the silo to turn on an exhaust fan. Livingston reentered the silo to carry out the order and shortly thereafter, at about 3:00 a.m., the hypergolic fuel exploded—likely due to arcing in the exhaust fan. The initial explosion catapulted the 743-ton silo door away from the silo and ejected the second stage and warhead. Once clear of the silo, the second stage exploded. The W53 thermonuclear warhead landed about 100 feet (30 m) from the launch complex's entry gate. Its safety features prevented any loss of radioactive material or nuclear detonation.

=== Aftermath ===
Livingston died at the hospital, and 21 others in the immediate vicinity of the blast sustained various injuries; Kennedy struggled with respiratory issues from inhaling oxidizer but survived. Livingston was posthumously promoted to staff sergeant. The entire missile launch complex was destroyed.

As word of the explosion reached the American public, U.S. President Jimmy Carter made a news broadcast reassuring the people of Arkansas that there had been no leakage of radioactive material and that the situation was under control. Arkansas governor Bill Clinton said Air Force officials told him in an official briefing that no nuclear explosion could have occurred inside the silo. At daybreak, the Air Force retrieved the warhead, which was returned to the Pantex weapons assembly plant.

The launch complex was never repaired. Pieces of debris were taken away from the 400 acres (1.6 km^{2}) surrounding the facility, and the site was buried under a mound of gravel, soil, and small concrete debris. The land is now under private ownership. The site was listed on the National Register of Historic Places on February 18, 2000.

Even after the cleanup, there was worry among the general public that the warhead could have detonated as a result of the explosion. In response, the authorities issued a statement that declared the chances of this occurring were next to impossible, as the W-53 had been fitted with numerous failsafes to ensure that no accidental detonation could ever occur.

Kennedy, initially praised as a hero, later received an official letter of reprimand for his first entry into the complex, as it later transpired that he had disregarded an order to stay away.

== Popular culture ==
External videos
- After Words interview with Schlosser on Command and Control, September 27, 2013, C-SPAN

A 1988 television film, Disaster at Silo 7, is based on this event. In September 2013, Eric Schlosser published a book titled Command and Control: Nuclear Weapons, the Damascus Accident, and the Illusion of Safety. It focused on the explosion, as well as other broken arrow incidents during the Cold War. A documentary film titled Command and Control from director Robert Kenner, based on Schlosser's book, was released on January 10, 2017. The film was broadcast by PBS as part of its American Experience series. Jeff Plumb's account of his role in the incident was featured in a 2017 episode of WBEZ's This American Life.

== See also ==
- List of military nuclear accidents
- National Register of Historic Places listings in Van Buren County, Arkansas
- 1965 Searcy missile silo fire
