= Command and Control (film) =

- Theatrical release poster
- Directed by: Robert Kenner
- Screenplay by: Robert Kenner; Eric Schlosser
- Based on: Command and Control: Nuclear Weapons, the Damascus Accident, and the Illusion of Safety by Eric Schlosser
- Produced by: Robert Kenner; Melissa Robledo; Mark Samels; Eric Schlosser
- Cinematography: Paul Goldsmith; Jay Redmond
- Edited by: Kim Roberts
- Music by: Mark Adler
- Production companies: American Experience; Robert Kenner Films
- Distributed by: PBS
- Release date: April 17, 2016
- Running time: 92 minutes
- Country: United States
- Language: English

Command and Control is a 2016 American documentary film directed by Robert Kenner and based on the 2013 non-fiction book of the same name by Eric Schlosser. It was released initially in the United States at the Tribeca Film Festival and then in the United Kingdom at the Sheffield Doc/Fest on June 11, 2016. It is based on the 1980 Damascus Titan missile explosion in Damascus, Arkansas between September 18–19, 1980. The film aired on the PBS network series American Experience on January 10, 2017.

== Reception ==
It received a score of 78% on Metacritic and won the award for Best Documentary Screenplay from the Writers Guild of America.

The film was among 15 on the "shortlist" for the Academy Award for Best Documentary Feature (in respect of the 89th Academy Awards) but was not among the five nominees.

Tirdad Derakhshani of The Philadelphia Inquirer wrote, "[Will] have your heart racing."

== Film facts ==
Parts of the film were filmed at the Titan Missile Museum in Green Valley, Arizona.
