= Lloyd R. Leavitt Jr. =

American Air Force lieutenant general

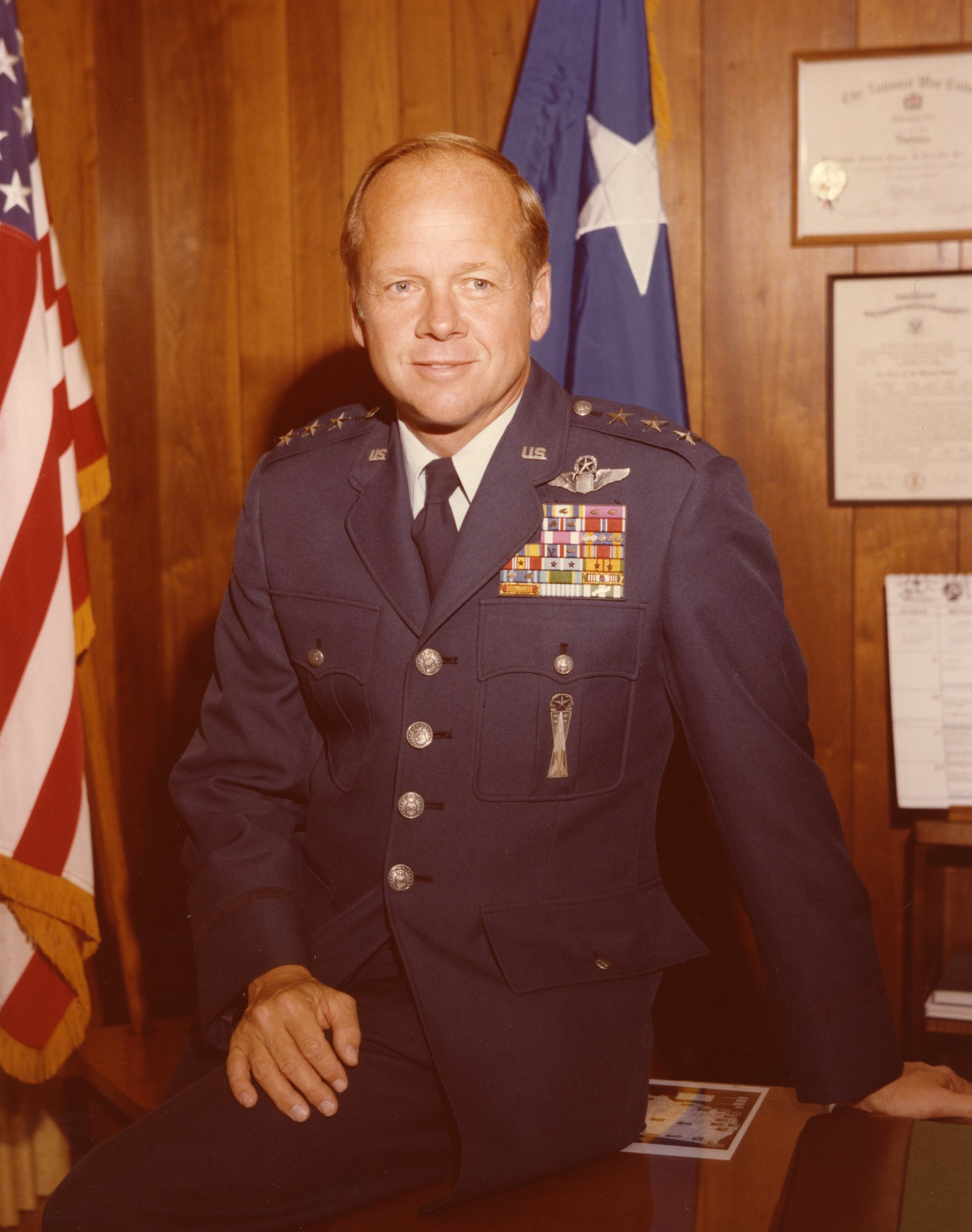
- Born: November 18, 1928; Alpena, Michigan
- Died: March 14, 2016 (aged 87); Fair Oaks Ranch, Texas
- Military career
- Allegiance: United States
- Branch: United States Air Force
- Service years: 1950–1981
- Rank: Lieutenant General
- Nickname: Dick
- Commands: Vice Commander-in-Chief, Strategic Air Command
- Awards: Distinguished Service Medal with oak leaf cluster, Legion of Merit with two oak leaf clusters, Distinguished Flying Cross with two oak leaf clusters, Bronze Star Medal, Meritorious Service Medal, Air Medal with 13 oak leaf clusters, Air Force Commendation Medal, Air Force Outstanding Unit Award ribbon with two "V" devices and the Republic of Argentina Aviador Militar "Honoris Causa."

Lloyd Richardson Leavitt Jr. (November 18, 1928 – March 14, 2016) was an American Air Force lieutenant general. As vice commander in chief of the Strategic Air Command, Offutt Air Force Base, Nebraska, he fulfilled the responsibilities of the SAC commander in chief in his absence. He was also the commander's principal adviser in the formulation of SAC policies, plans, and directives.

== Biography ==
Leavitt was born in 1928, in Alpena, Michigan. In 1946, he graduated from Alpena High School. He was appointed to the U.S. Military Academy at West Point, New York. In 1950, he graduated with a commission as a second lieutenant and a bachelor of science degree in engineering. He received a master's degree in public administration from The George Washington University, Washington, D.C., in 1964; graduated from Squadron Officer School at Maxwell Air Force Base, Alabama, in 1956; and the National War College, Fort Lesley J. McNair, Washington, D.C., in 1967.

After graduation from the academy, he attended flying training school at Williams Air Force Base, Arizona, and was awarded pilot wings in 1951. During the Korean War Leavitt served in South Korea as a pilot and flight commander with the 58th Fighter-Bomber Wing. He flew 100 combat missions in F-84s.

From August 1952 to November 1953, Leavitt was assigned to Headquarters Far East Air Forces Directorate of Requirements, Fuchu Air Station, Japan. He was a flight commander in the 508th Strategic Fighter Wing at Turner Air Force Base, Georgia. From 1957, he was a U-2 pilot. He later was chief of standardization in the 4028th Strategic Reconnaissance Weather Squadron at Laughlin Air Force Base, Texas.

In October 1960, he entered B-52 training. He was assigned to the first B-52H unit — the 524th Bombardment Squadron at Wurtsmith Air Force Base, Mich. From 1962, he was chief of the 379th Bombardment Wing Training Operations Branch. He was later an operations staff officer with the 40th Air Division at Wurtsmith Air Force Base.

From November 1962 to July 1966, Leavitt was an operations staff officer at Headquarters, United States Air Force, Washington, D.C. Office of the Deputy Chief of Staff for Plans and Operations, working in studies and analysis.

Following graduation from the National War College in August 1967, Leavitt was assistant deputy commander for operations of the 36th Tactical Fighter Wing at Bitburg Air Base, Germany. He was later director of readiness inspection for the inspector general, Headquarters United States Air Forces in Europe, Lindsey Air Station, Germany.

From April 1970, he was vice commander of the 8th Tactical Fighter Wing at Ubon Royal Thai Air Force Base, Thailand. From October 1970, he was commander of the 432nd Tactical Reconnaissance Wing at Udorn Royal Thai Air Force Base. While in Southeast Asia, he flew 152 combat missions, the majority in F-4s.

In April 1971, Leavitt was deputy director for strike forces in the U.S. Air Force Headquarters Directorate of Operations (A-3). From July 1972, he was deputy director of operations (regional operations) in the Joint Chiefs of Staff Directorate of Operations (J-3).

From July 1974 to July 1976, Leavitt was commander of Chanute Technical Training Center, Chanute Air Force Base, Illinois, one of five technical training centers within Air Training Command.

He was deputy chief of staff for operations and intelligence at U.S. Air Forces in Europe Headquarters, Ramstein Air Base, Germany. He was responsible for operational and intelligence matters affecting Air Force units in Europe and the Middle East. From January 1978, he was SAC chief of staff. From June 1978 to 1981, he was SAC vice commander.

On 18–19 September 1980, while vice commander of SAC, Leavitt commanded the effort to save the Titan II missile at Launch Complex 374-7 in Damascus, Arkansas, despite having no experience managing the Titan II or its silos. He has been criticized for his handling of the Damascus accident, including waiting several hours to develop a plan as the missile leaked fuel, overruling experts on the ground, issuing the order for a crew to activate an exhaust fan that likely caused the explosion, and placing blame for the disaster on lower-level personnel.

Leavitt was a command pilot with 5,000 flying hours. His military decorations and awards include the Distinguished Service Medal with oak leaf cluster, Legion of Merit with two oak leaf clusters, Distinguished Flying Cross with two oak leaf clusters, Bronze Star, Meritorious Service Medal, Air Medal with 13 oak leaf clusters, Air Force Commendation Medal, Air Force Outstanding Unit Award ribbon with two "V" devices, and the Republic of Argentina Aviador Militar "Honoris Causa."

On August 22, 1978, he was promoted to lieutenant general, with date of rank August 20, 1978. He retired September 1, 1981 and died on March 14, 2016.
