= Reuben Sturman =

American pornographer and businessman

- An undated mug shot of Sturman
- Born: August 16, 1924; Cleveland, Ohio, U.S.
- Died: October 27, 1997 (aged 73); Lexington, Kentucky, U.S.
- Other name: The Walt Disney of Porn
- Convictions: Tax evasion (1989); Extortion (1993)
- Penalty: 10 years' imprisonment, $2.5 million fine (1989); 19 years' imprisonement (1993)

Reuben Sturman (August 16, 1924 – October 27, 1997), sometimes referred to as the "Walt Disney of Porn", was an American pornographer and businessman from Ohio who co-founded sex toy company Doc Johnson. He was featured as a subject in Eric Schlosser's 2003 book on underground economies, Reefer Madness: Sex, Drugs, and Cheap Labor in the American Black Market.

== Life and career ==
Sturman, the son of immigrant Russian Jews, grew up on Cleveland's East Side. He served in the Army Air Forces during World War II and then went on to study at Case Western Reserve University, graduating in 1948, before starting his own business selling comic books from his car. By the late 1950s, his business had swelled to a major wholesale magazine company with affiliates in several American cities. During the 1960s, Sturman started selling magazines with sexual content, a product he discovered could make profits that outmatched anything that could be achieved by selling any kind of comic book. By the late 1960s, Sturman was the biggest distributor of adult magazines in the U.S.

His first problems with the authorities started in 1964, when Federal Bureau of Investigation (FBI) agents raided a Cleveland warehouse, confiscating copies of a book entitled Sex Life of a Cop. This was the start of over two decades of legal difficulties. Though his operations were raided and large volumes of magazines were confiscated on numerous occasions, Sturman managed to avoid prosecution by counter-suits, shady business practices, and by using at least 20 different aliases to protect his identity. Sturman became increasingly involved in semi-legal or criminal activities during this time and had connections with the Gambino crime family.

The American journalist and writer Eric Schlosser described Sturman in a U.S. News & World Report article in 1997:

To his defenders in the sex industry, Sturman was a marketing genius and a champion of free speech, an entrepreneur whose toughness, intelligence, and boundless self-confidence were responsible for his successes. But to anti-porn activists and Justice Department officials, Sturman was the head of a vast criminal organization whose companies enjoyed an unfair competitive advantage: protection and support from the highest levels of the Cosa Nostra.

Sturman's refusal to pay taxes properly finally brought him down. In 1989, Sturman was convicted of tax evasion and sentenced to 10 years in jail and $2.5 million in fines. Another charge, this time for the interstate transportation of obscene material, resulted in a plea bargain for Sturman, but he was later caught trying to bribe a juror, via his ex-wife, and was sentenced to 19 additional years for extortion. He briefly escaped prison in Boron, California, but was re-apprehended in Anaheim. He died in a federal prison in Lexington, Kentucky, on October 27, 1997.

== See also ==
- Jimmy Flynt
- Larry Flynt
- Al Goldstein
- Harry Mohney
