= Robert Kenner =

American film director

- Born: New Rochelle, NY, U.S.
- Occupations: Film director, film producer, television director, television producer, screenwriter, television writer
- Years active: 1971–present

Robert Kenner is an American film and television director, producer, and writer. Kenner is best known for directing the film Food, Inc. as well as the films, Command and Control, Merchants of Doubt, and When Strangers Click.

== Career ==
Kenner's most recent project is 2019's five-part documentary series The Confession Killer, which examines notorious serial killer Henry Lee Lucas and what may be the greatest hoax in American criminal justice history.

In 2016, Kenner released Command and Control, a documentary of a 1980s nuclear missile accident in Arkansas, based on Eric Schlosser's award-winning book of the same name.

In 2014, he released Merchants of Doubt, inspired by Naomi Oreskes' and Erik Conway's book of the same name. The film explores how a handful of skeptics have obscured the truth on issues from tobacco smoke, to toxic chemicals, to global warming.

In 2011, Kenner released When Strangers Click for HBO. The film was nominated for an Emmy Award.

In 2008, he produced and directed the Oscar nominated, Emmy winning documentary film, Food, Inc., which examines the industrialization of the American food system and its impacts on workers, consumers, and the environment. Variety wrote that Food, Inc. “does for the supermarket what Jaws did for the beach.”

In 2003, Kenner worked as co-filmmaker with Richard Pearce on The Road to Memphis for Martin Scorsese’s series, The Blues. Newsweek called the film, “the unadulterated gem of the Scorsese series.”

Kenner has directed and produced numerous films for the award-winning PBS documentary series, American Experience including Two Days In October, which received a Peabody Award, an Emmy, and a Grierson award.

He has directed and produced several films for National Geographic including America's Endangered Species: Don't Say Goodbye, which received the Strand Award for Best Documentary from the International Documentary Association.

Kenner has also directed a number of award-winning commercials and corporate videos for eBay, Hewlett Packard, Hallmark Cards, and others.
