= 1965 Searcy missile silo fire =

American missile silo fire

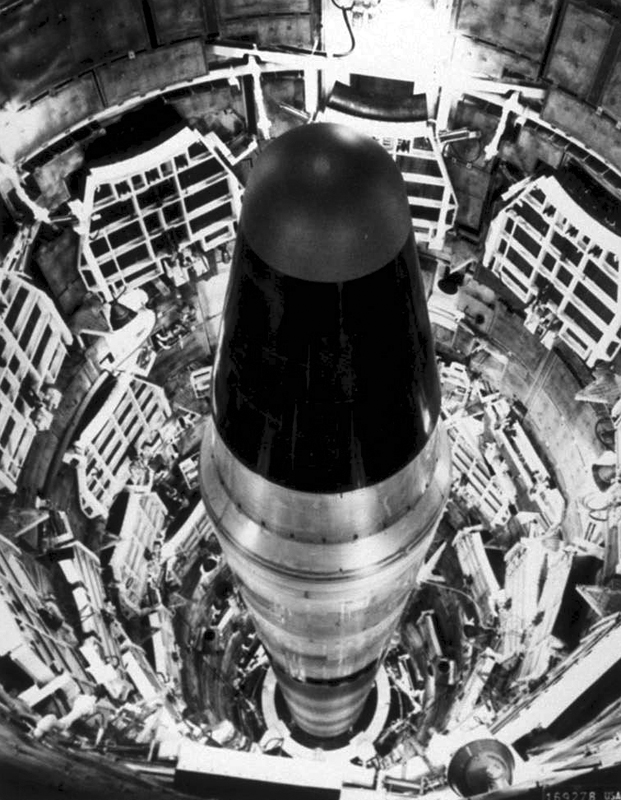
- An LGM-25C Titan intercontinental ballistic missile in a silo
- Date: 9 August 1965; 61 years ago
- Location: Titan II ICBM Launch Complex 373-4, Searcy, Arkansas, US
- Outcome: Silo repaired and resumed operation
- Deaths: 53

The 1965 Searcy missile silo fire was an uncontrolled fire inside a Titan II missile silo near Searcy, Arkansas on August 9, 1965. The fire broke out while the missile silo was being renovated and improved; the missile was installed and fueled at the time, although the nuclear warhead had been removed.

== Description ==
Missile silo 373-4 was one of 18 Titan II nuclear missile launch silos in Arkansas, located 11 miles (18 km) north of Searcy. The nine-story underground silo was completed on July 31, 1962 and brought online on May 16, 1963.

In August 1965, non-military contractors were strengthening the silo against potential nuclear attack as part of a broader initiative called Project Yard Fence. As a part of this project the missile's warhead had been disarmed and removed. The 55 men onsite were employed by Peter Kiewit Sons and Newbery Electric Corporation.

Soon after workers returned from lunch on August 9, a fire broke out on Level 2 of the silo, rapidly filling the silo with smoke and hampering visibility. Electrical power was also lost. Workers jammed the emergency exit ladders and were quickly asphyxiated. The only two workers to survive—59-year-old Hubert Saunders and 17-year-old Gary Lay, in his first day on the job—reached the command center via the Level 2 passageway; the other workers tried to use the vertical ladders in the silo to reach the surface. Saunders suffered smoke inhalation while Lay suffered second- and third-degree burns.

The remaining 53 workers in the silo—ranging in age from 21 to 69—perished. Two workers were descending into the silo when the fire began and were able to return to the surface. Four Air Force personnel in the control center, as well as various workers on the surface, were unharmed.

Firefighting efforts continued throughout the afternoon of August 9. Attempts to open the main silo door for ventilation were unsuccessful, and rescuers were at first unable to penetrate the silo deeper than Level 2. There was a danger of explosion from the missile, which despite being disarmed was still fueled. Firefighters worked through the night to extinguish the fire, lower the silo temperature, and recover bodies.

The fire represented the greatest loss of life ever suffered at a US nuclear facility. However the disaster is not considered a Broken Arrow incident, since the missile's nuclear warhead was not installed at the time. By coincidence, that Titan II missile, serial number 62-0006, was the same missile involved in the 1980 Damascus Titan missile explosion.

== Aftermath ==
Members of the Air Force Aerospace Safety Missile Accident Investigation Team arrived on August 10 and began a search of the site. Evidence of extreme heat was discovered in Level 3 along with large quantities of hydraulic fluid. The missile itself was found to be undamaged and was removed while investigation continued.

Investigators later determined that a welder had been attaching a stiffener plate at an awkward angle when his welding rod made contact with a high-pressure hydraulic hose, melting the hose and igniting the fluid inside. Lack of adequate lighting, ventilation, and escape exits also contributed to the loss of life. The two survivors—Saunders and Lay—disagreed with the official conclusions and claimed that no welding was underway at the time of the fire.

Despite the heavy loss of life, damage from the fire itself was minor. The missile silo was refurbished and continued to operate until February 1987.

A granite monument to the victims of the fire was dedicated in 1986 at Little Rock Air Force Base in Jacksonville. Today the monument stands at the Jacksonville Museum of Military History. A smaller marker and historical plaque stand at the corner of Dewey and Snowden Road near Arkansas Highway 16 between Pangburn and Searcy (35°22′20″N 91°48′17″W).

== See also ==
- 1980 Damascus Titan missile explosion
- List of military nuclear accidents
