= Williams Air Force Base =

United States Air Force (USAF) base (1941–1993)

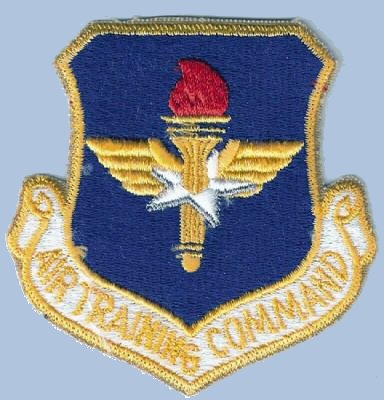
Williams Air Force Base Williams Army Airfield
- Part of Air Training Command (ATC)
- Located in Maricopa County, Arizona
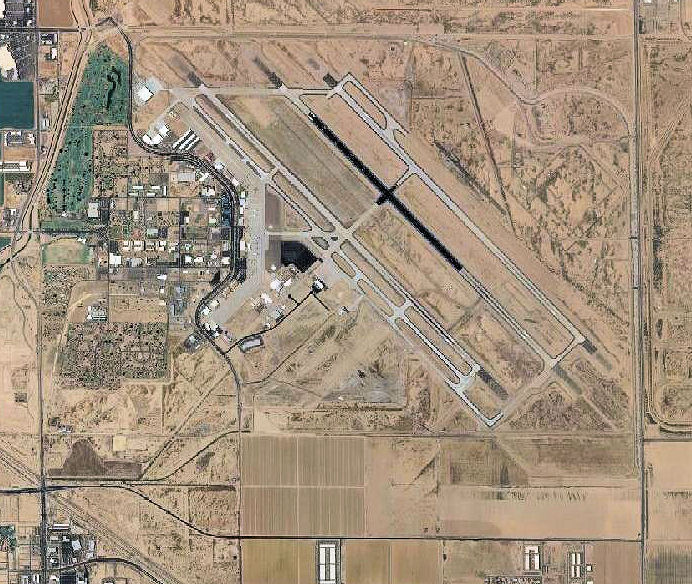
- 2006 USGS airphoto

Site information
- Type: Air Force Base
- Controlled by: United States Air Force

Location
- Location within Arizona
- Coordinates: 33°18′29″N 111°39′35″W

Site history
- Built: 1941
- Built by: Del E. Webb Construction Company
- In use: 1941–1993

Garrison information
- Garrison: Air Training Command
- Occupants: 82d Training Wing (1973–1993)

Williams Air Force Base is a former United States Air Force (USAF) base, located in Maricopa County, Arizona, east of Chandler, and about 30 miles (48 km) southeast of Phoenix. It is a designated Superfund site due to a number of soil and groundwater contaminants.

It was active as a training base for both the United States Army Air Forces, as well as the USAF from 1941 until its closure in 1993. Williams was the leading pilot training facility of the USAF, supplying 25% of all pilots.

Since its closure, the base has largely been annexed by the city of Mesa, Arizona. It was converted into the civilian Williams Gateway Airport, later renamed Mesa Gateway Airport. In recent years, the land has emerged as an educational and industrial campus anchored by Arizona State University Polytechnic Campus and Chandler-Gilbert Community College.

== History ==
During March 1941, some citizens of Mesa, Arizona, were actively working on obtaining a U.S. Army Air Corps facility located near their city. One of the sites seriously considered for the new airfield was on the Gila River Indian Reservation located near Chandler, Arizona. At the time, the land on which Williams would eventually be built was vacant and not used for agriculture due to a lack of irrigation. It had no homes or farms and was essentially desert with a few Indian ruins scattered on it. On their own initiative, the city of Mesa began to acquire rights to the property that was divided among 33 different owners. Agreements were made for a railroad spur line, along with the appropriate electric, water, telephone and gas services.

The hard work paid off with the announcement in June 1941 that the War Department had approved the site for an Army Air Corps base. Construction of the new base started on 16 July 1941 with a ceremony attended by Mesa, Arizona, mayor George Nicholas Goodman and Arizona governor Sidney P. Osborn, who both attended the groundbreaking of Falcon Field that morning. Initial construction was completed in December, making the base operational.

As of 10 December, the airfield had no name and a debate ensued on what to call the new base. It was initially named Mesa Military Airport. the name was changed October 1941 to Higley Field, the base being in the proximity of the town of Higley, Arizona. In February 1942, the growing military airfield's name was changed to Williams Field in honor of Arizona native 1st Lt Charles Linton Williams (1898–1927). Lieutenant Williams died on 6 July 1927 when his Boeing PW-9A pursuit aircraft crashed near Fort DeRussy, Hawaii.

As a flying school, numerous runways and auxiliary airfields were constructed. The main airfield consisted of three concrete 6,000 ft (1,800 m) runways aligned NE/SW, ENE/WSW and NE/SW. A blacktop landing area 5,500 ft × 1,430 ft (1,680 m × 440 m) was aligned E/W to the south of the main field and a 4,100 ft × 1,350 ft (1,250 m × 410 m) blacktop landing area was aligned E/W to the south of the main field.

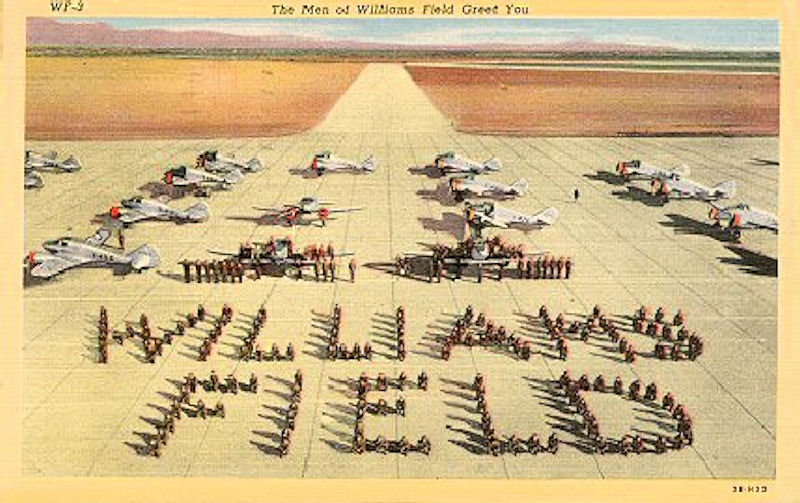
Postcard from Williams Field showing aircraft and cadets standing in formation

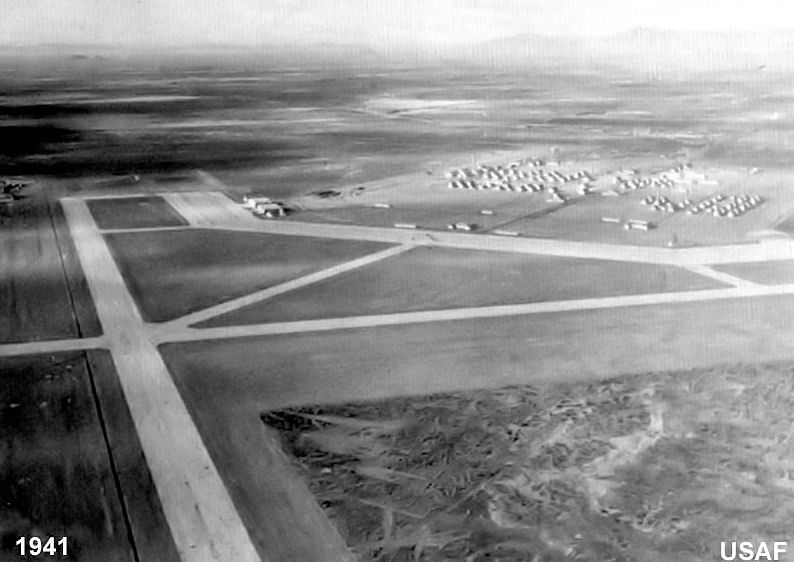
Williams Army Airfield Arizona 1941

Known auxiliary airfields were:

- Gilbert Field (Aux #1) 33°23′14″N 111°40′26″W

Redeveloped in the 1970s. Today housing development S of US 60 in Gilbert, Arizona.

- Rittenhouse Field (Aux #2) 33°15′29″N 111°31′03″W

Today: Rittenhouse Army Heliport (FAA LID: AZ38) used by Arizona National Guard, adjacent to suburbs of Gilbert, Arizona

- Casa Grande Field (Aux #3) 32°57′18″N 111°45′58″W

Today: Casa Grande Municipal Airport (ICAO: KCGZ, FAA LID: CGZ) in Casa Grande, Arizona.

- Goodyear Field (Aux #4) 33°14′36″N 111°54′47″W

Today: Gila River Memorial Airport (FAA LID: 34AZ) southwest of Chandler, Arizona.

- Williams Auxiliary Army Airfield #5 33°14′36″N 111°54′57″W

Build 1942. Today Gila River Memorial Airport (FAA LID: 34AZ)

- Coolidge AAF 32°56′09″N 111°25′36″W

Was auxiliary until 1944, turned over to Air Transport Command in May 1944. Today: Coolidge Municipal Airport (FAA LID: P08).

- Cutter Field 33°21′11″N 110°40′03″W

Was emergency landing field. Today: San Carlos Apache Airport (ICAO: P18) near Cutter, Arizona.

- Ajo AAF 32°27′10″N 112°51′41″W

Transferred from Luke AAF, June 1943. Part of the Gila Bend Gunnery Range. Today: Eric Marcus Municipal Airport (FAA LID: P01)

- Gila Bend AAFAF (ICAO: KGXF) 32°53′15″N 112°43′12″W

Transferred from Luke AAF, June 1943. Part of the Gila Bend Gunnery Range

  - Gila Bend #6/Williams AAF #4: 32°43′11″N 112°51′14″W
  - Gila Bend #6/Williams AAF #5: 32°49′05″N 112°54′54″W
  - Gila Bend #6/Williams AAF #6: 32°53′05″N 112°48′59″W

=== World War II ===
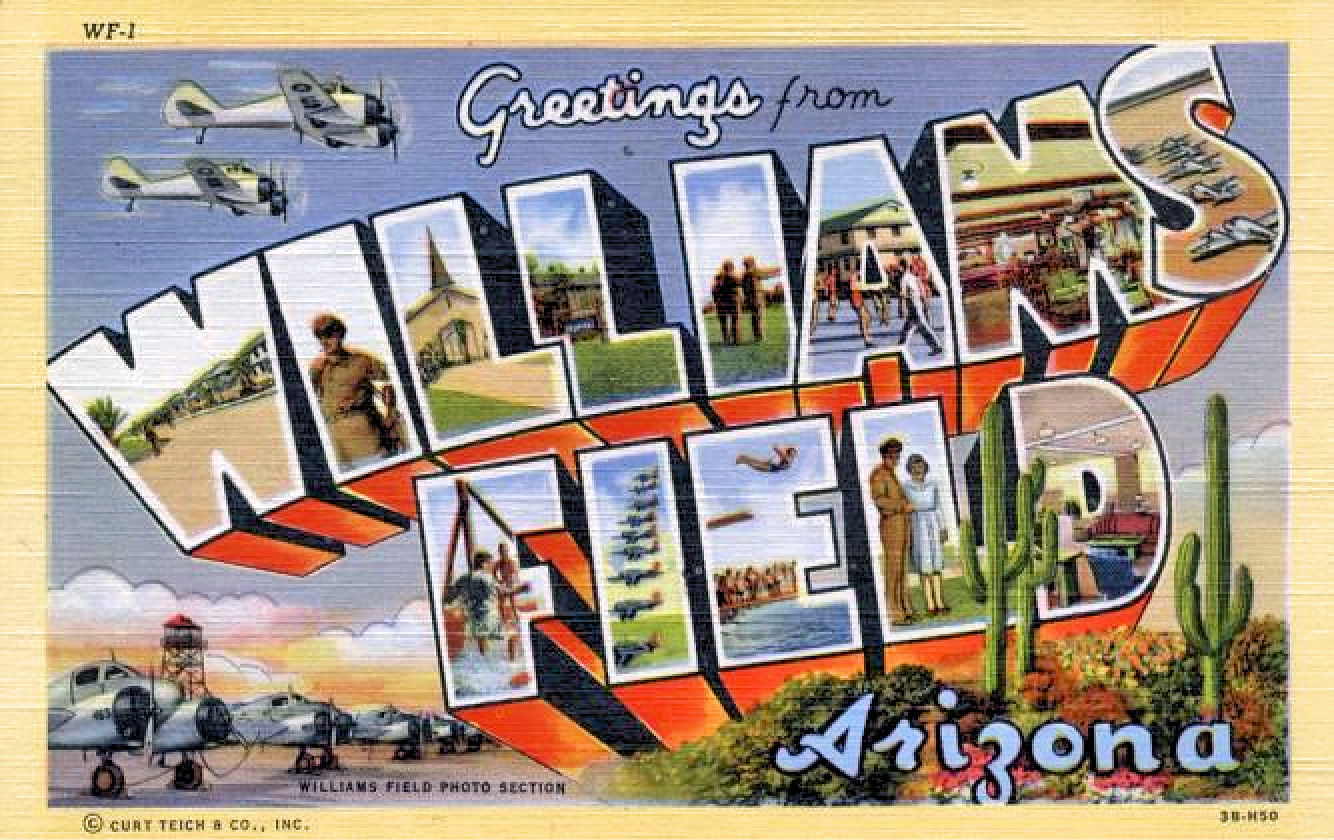
World War II postcard

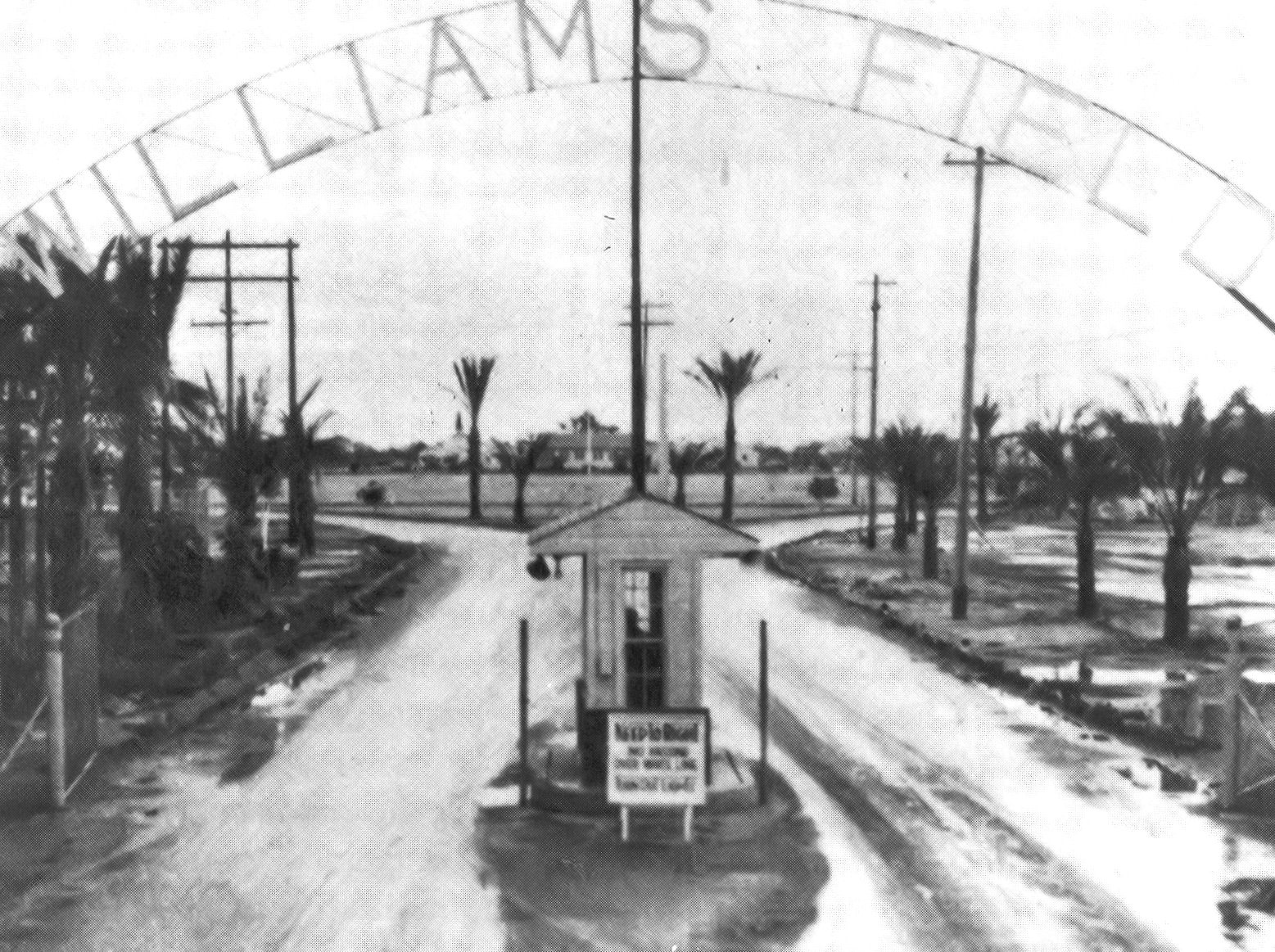
Williams Army Airfield - Main Gate 1942

During World War II, Williams Field was under the command of the 89th Army Air Force Base Unit, AAF West Coast Training Center. The flying organization was the 38th (Bombardier and Specialized Twin- and 4-Engine) Flying Training Wing. Thousands of future P-38 Lightning pilots learnt their twin-engine flying skills flying the Beech AT-10 Wichita at Williams. By July 1942, there were 79 AT-10s assigned to the field, however the hot, dry climate of Arizona tended to dry out the wood and glue of the wooden AT-10s, causing at least 10 flying cadets to lose their lives in crashes. Training with the AT-10 was stopped and the aircraft were flown to more humid locations. They were replaced by the Cessna AT-17 Bobcat twin engine trainers, however the AT-17 was seen as "too easy to fly" and were replaced by the more demanding Curtiss-Wright AT-9. By January 1943, almost 200 AT-9s were at the airfield.

The RP-322 training version of the P-38 began to arrive also in early 1944, and by May, the flying school was involved in four courses of instruction. By far, the largest course was a single-engine advanced course where cadets received instruction on the AT-6 Texan. Graduates advanced to the twin-engine AT-9, then on to the RP-322. This training was intended to prepare pilots for photo-reconnaissance missions. Another course was given to experienced pilots who were transitioning to twin-engine aircraft, also in the RP-322. Later, a night fighter training program was established for pilots on the RP-322 for later transition to the P-61 Black Widow at Hammer Field, California.

By late 1944, there was an ample supply of twin-engine pilots in training and by late 1944, the single-engine T-6 training was discontinued. Williams then began to offer four-engine training with Boeing B-17 Flying Fortress bombers in December. Its students would be experienced pilots who were transitioning to the large four-engine bomber. The B-17 pilot training ended in April 1945, graduating 608 officers for the Flying Fortress program.

The training mission of the base also conducted flexible gunnery training, and radar observer training.

After the United States entered the war, the Army Air Forces also developed a pilot training program for the Chinese Air Force. The Air Corps conducted most of the training for the Chinese at Luke AFB, Williams, and Thunderbird Field in Arizona. Training the Chinese presented some special challenges because, due to their small stature, some students could not reach all the controls. That problem was usually solved through the use of extra cushions and occasionally by switching them to another type of airplane. A bigger problem was the language barrier. It took all the interpreters the Air Force could muster to support the training programs for the Chinese. In the end, 3,553 Chinese received flying and technical training, including 866 pilots.

=== Postwar era ===
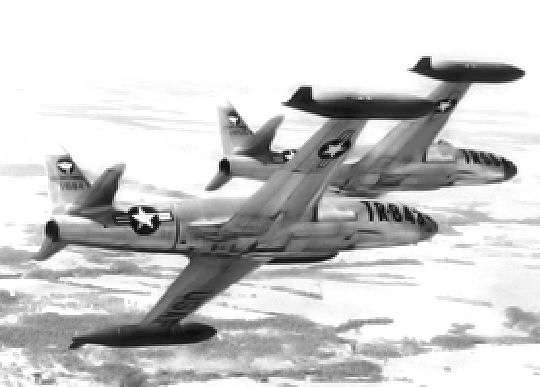
T-33 Jet Trainers at Williams AFB, June 1949

After the end of the war in September 1945, most of the temporary training bases were put on inactive status and eventually closed. This was particularly true for bases like Williams that had sprung up overnight and were built with temporary wooden structures. However, Williams was an exception and remained open after World War II.

In early 1945, the first P-80 Shooting Star jet pilot school was opened at Williams. Army Air Forces Training Command was re-designated as Air Training Command, and in 1946 all flight instruction was integrated into a new consolidated program. The P-80 jet fighter pilot transition and fighter gunnery schools at Williams Field remained; however, the gunnery school existed only to fulfill research obligations.

Fighter gunnery training was reestablished in early 1947. The new program studied the use of fighter gunnery, bombing, and rocketry equipment. Students flew P-51 Mustangs, P-47 Thunderbolts, and beginning at midyear, P-80s. The gunnery school, however was again discontinued on 1 June 1948 and moved to Las Vegas AFB, Nevada.

By early 1947 the AAF had sped up its conversion to jet aircraft. However, the training program was handicapped by the fact that no twin-seat jet aircraft trainers yet existed. Putting untrained jet pilots into a single-seat fighter endangered personnel and expensive equipment. To overcome this problem, Air Training Command decided to use a newly developed "captivair" training device. It was received and installed at Williams in early 1947. In 1949, T-33 Shooting Star jet trainer derivatives of the F-80 began to arrive.

=== 3525th Pilot Training Wing ===
With the establishment of the United States Air Force in September 1947, Williams Army Airfield was re-designated Williams Air Force Base on 13 January 1948. In addition, the 89th AAFBU was discontinued and the 3525th Pilot Training Wing (Advanced Single-Engine) was established as the host unit at the new Air Force Base. Training squadrons under the 3525th Pilot Training Group were:

- 3525th Training Squadron, 26 August 1948

Re-designated 4532d Combat Crew Training Squadron, 1 July 1958
Re-designated 3525th Pilot Training Squadron, 1 October 1960 – 1 February 1973

- 3526th Training Squadron, 26 May 1949

Re-designated 4533d Combat Crew Training Squadron, 1 July 1958
Re-designated 3526th Pilot Training Squadron, 1 October 1960 – 1 February 1973

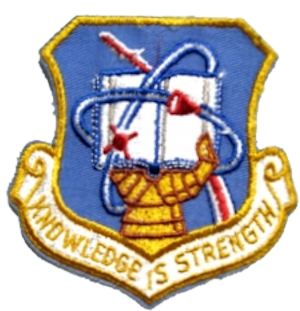
Emblem of the 3525th Pilot Training Wing

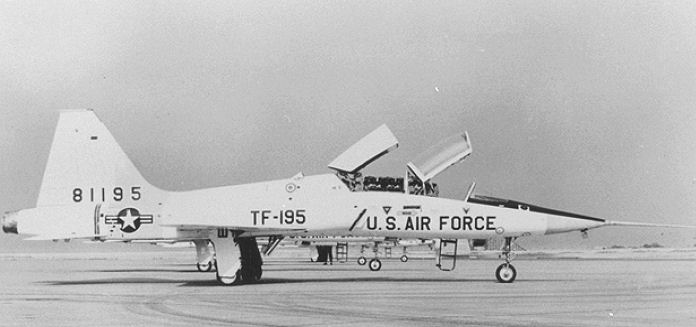
T-38A Talon, 1963

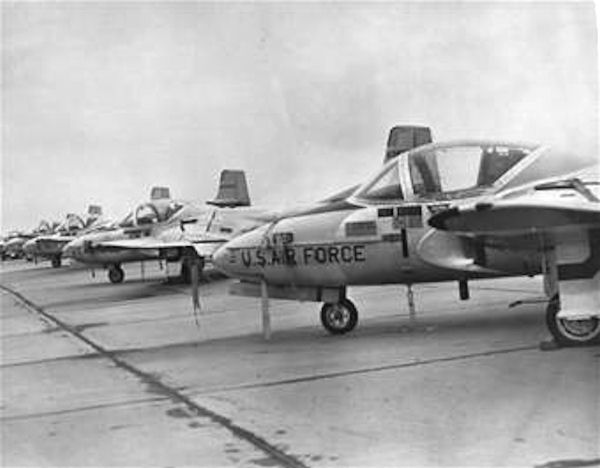
T-37 Tweets, 1971

Through the Mutual Defense Assistance Program began in 1952, international students received flying or technical training at various ATC bases. Students from Taiwan began to arrive at Williams, and training of Taiwanese pilots continued until the closure of the base in 1993.

Air Training Command redesignated the 3525th Pilot Training Wing (Basic Single-Engine) at Williams on 1 January 1956. It became the 3525th Combat Crew Training Wing (Fighter). A month later, on 1 February 1956, ATC reassigned the 3525th from its Flying Training Air Force to Crew Training Air Force. It also discontinued the single engine basic pilot school (T-28 Trojan) at Williams and replaced it with an advanced fighter school with T-33s exclusively. (Williams had transferred its single-engine training responsibilities to Laughlin AFB, Texas in September 1955.)

In 1958, Air Training Command transferred its combat pilot training to Strategic Air Command (SAC) and Tactical Air Command (TAC). ATC would concentrate on Primary and Basic flying training. As a result, jurisdiction of Williams was passed to TAC on 1 July. This was a brief transfer, as on 1 October 1960, TAC transferred Williams AFB back to ATC. Williams would become part of ATC's new consolidated pilot training program. On the same date, Tactical Air Command reassigned its 4530th Combat Crew Training Wing (Tactical Fighter) and subordinate units at Williams to ATC and ATC discontinued the wing. Concurrently, Air Training Command used assets from the 4530th to organize and establish the 3525th Pilot Training Wing.

Pilot training continued throughout the 1960s. The T-33s began to be phased out in 1962, being replaced by the T-38 Talon as the primary jet training aircraft. T-38s were used until the closure of Williams in 1993 along with the Cessna T-37 Tweet Both trainers were two-seat, dual-engine jet aircraft, the T-38 being capable of supersonic flight.

Students began with academic classroom and simulator instruction. After initial training in a Cessna T-41 at an offsite location (e.g., Eloy, AZ was used in the late 1960s), the first jet flight was largely a 'demo' flight in the T-37 aircraft with the instructor orienting the student to the aircraft, the local training area, and some basic flight maneuvers.

The undergraduate flight training program lasted just less than one full year and involved classroom, simulator, and aircraft training activities. Graduates were selected to remain as instructors, after an intensive training course, or went on to train in their primary weapon system aircraft.

==== F-5 Freedom Fighter ====
In 1963, Williams was selected to support the Military Assistance Program F-5A/B Freedom Fighter sales by providing pilots and maintenance training personnel to nations purchased the fighter under the MAP program. The F-5 was a lightweight fighter designed for allied nations, and was not programmed for USAF use. Initial deliveries, beginning in April 1964, were to the 4441st Combat Crew Training Squadron, which was activated to run the F-5 school.

The first overseas order for F-5As was from Norway, which ordered 64 aircraft plus four attrition replacements on 28 February 1964. Other nations whose pilots trained at Williams were South Vietnam, Iran, South Korea, Greece, Philippines, Taiwan, Turkey, Morocco, Pakistan, Ethiopia, Libya, Jordan, Spain and Yemen.

===== Skoshi Tiger Program =====
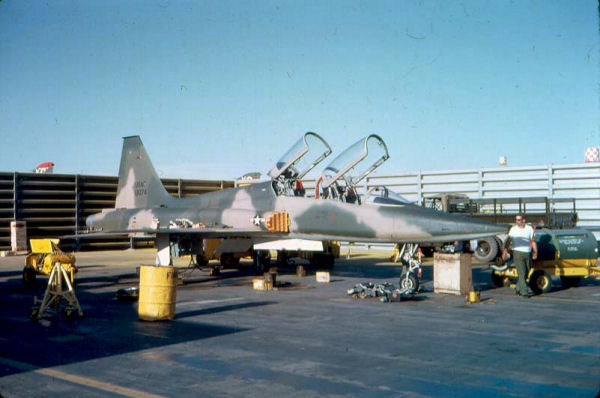
Skoshi Tiger F-5B of the 602th Fighter Squadron, Bien Hoa AB, South Vietnam, 1966

Although all F-5A/B production was intended for MAP, the USAF actually requested at least 200 F-5s for use in the Vietnam War. This sudden request on the part of the USAF which had previously perceived no need for a lightweight fighter, was a result of heavier than expected attrition in Southeast Asia and because the F-5 promised to be available with a relatively short lead time. The USAF request for combat evaluation in Southeast Asia was approved by the Department of Defense (DoD) in July 1965, and the evaluation was initiated on 26 July 1965.

The program was given the code name "Skoshi Tiger", which was a corruption of "Sukoshi Tiger" (Japanese for "Little Tiger"). In October 1965, the USAF "borrowed" 12 combat-ready F-5As from MAP supplies (5 F-5A-15s and seven F-5A-20s) and activated the 4503rd Tactical Fighter Wing (Provisional) at Williams for operational service trials. The 4503rd TFS (Provisional) was formed on 29 July 1965 to conduct the evaluation, and their pilots underwent training at Williams AFB while Northrop modified the aircraft for duty in Southeast Asia.

The aircraft left Williams AFB on 20 October 1965 for Southeast Asia, arriving at Bien Hoa Air Base on 23 October. They flew their first combat mission the same afternoon.

Although the Freedom Fighter was judged to be a technical success in Vietnam, the Skoshi Tiger program was essentially a political project, designed to appease those few USAF officers who believed in the aircraft. The Freedom Fighter was destined to have a relatively brief operational career with the USAF, and the DoD turned down a second request for F-5s, deciding instead to look at other types such as the U.S. Navy A-7 Corsair II. The surviving F-5s were turned over to the South Vietnamese in March 1966.

After the Skoshi Tiger program, substantial numbers of Freedom Fighters were supplied to the Republic of Vietnam Air Force. The USAF directed ATC to initiate immediately a training program for South Vietnamese F-5 pilot replacements. The 4441st CCTS at Williams began this training on 15 April, although the base's training facilities were already saturated by the school's undergraduate program. The first Vietnamese crews left for Williams AFB for training in August 1966.

The 4441st CCTS was transferred to Tactical Air Command and re-designated as the 425th Tactical Fighter Training Squadron on 15 October 1969. It was placed under the 58th Tactical Fighter Training Wing at Luke AFB, Arizona, although the squadron physically remained at Williams AFB as a Geographically Separate Unit (GSU).

Training of South Vietnamese pilots on the F-5 continued until the collapse of the South Vietnamese government in April 1975, with some pilots being at Williams at the time of the fall of Saigon.

===== F-5E/F Tiger II =====
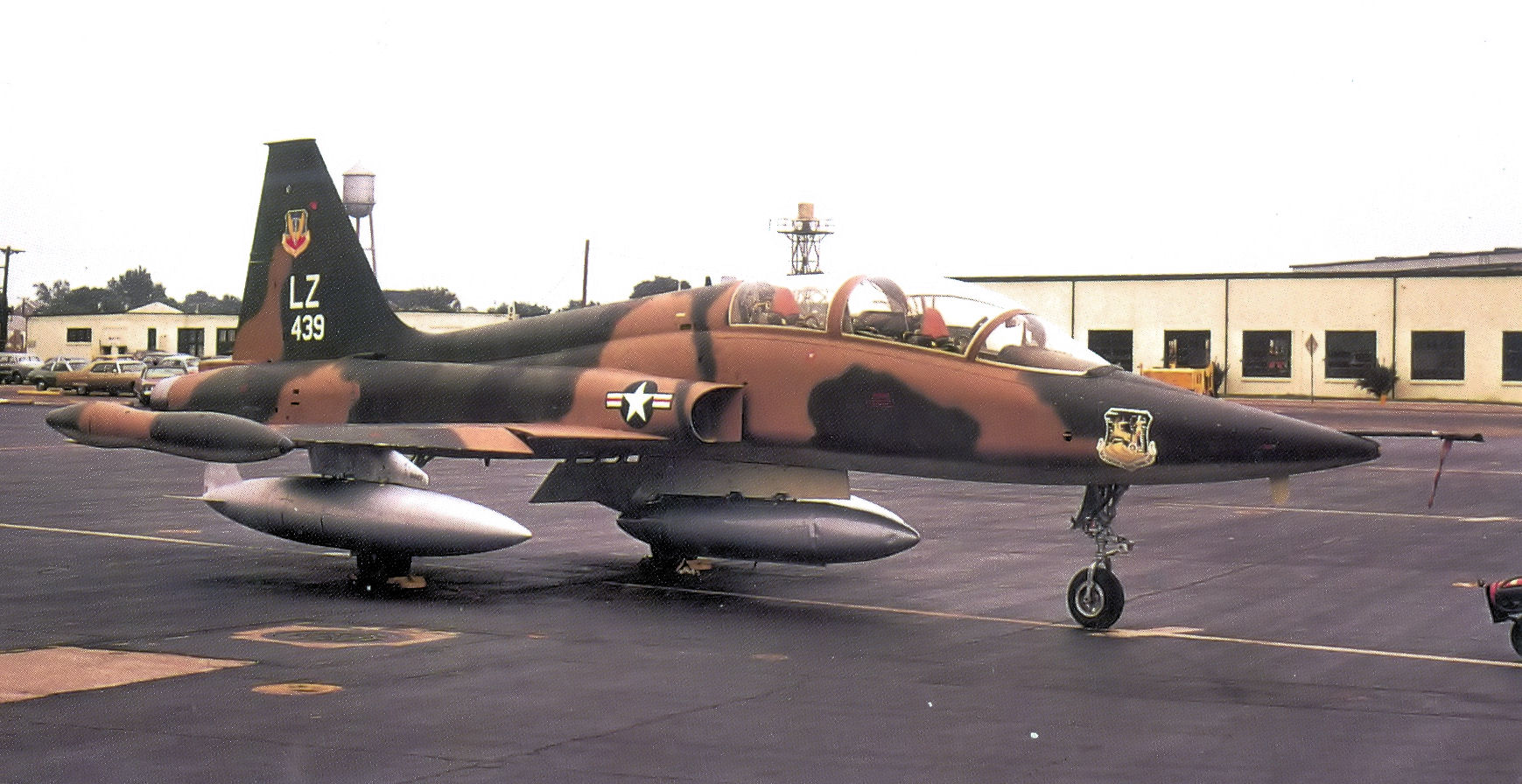
425th Tactical Fighter Training Squadron Northrop F-5B-50-NO Freedom Fighter, AF Ser. No. 72-0439, Williams AFB, Arizona, 1973

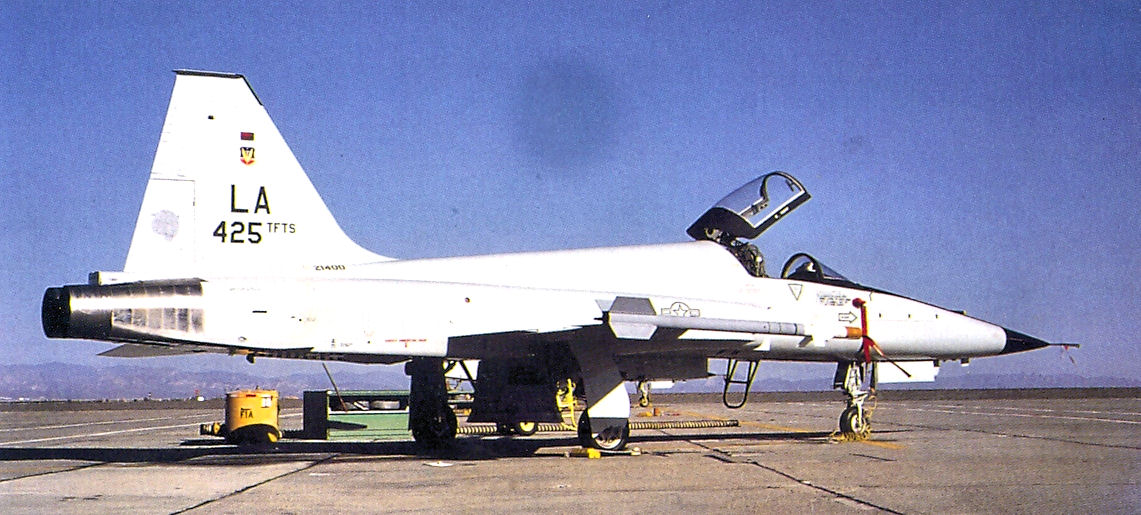
425th TFTS Northrop F-5E Tiger II, AF Ser. No. 72-1400. When the F-5 training program ended in 1989, this aircraft was sold to the Brazilian Air Force.

On 4 April 1973, the first upgraded F-5 Tiger II reached the 425th Tactical Fighter Training Squadron. This squadron was assigned the task of training for crews that had acquired the F-5E under MAP. Pilots from over 20 nations trained at Williams throughout the 1970s and 1980s on the F-5E. The F-5E/Fs assigned to the 425th for training carried USAF serial numbers and were procured through normal aircraft procurement procedures and channels. It initially carried tail code "LZ". Aircraft were re-coded to the common wing "LA" in 1974.

Although the USAF never did adopt the F-5E as a front-line combat aircraft, it did adopt the F-5E as a specialized aircraft for dissimilar air combat training (DACT). Beginning in 1975, some 70 F-5Es were turned over to the 64th and 65th Fighter Weapons Squadrons of the 57th Tactical Fighter Wing at Nellis AFB, Nevada. F-5Es were allocated to two more units that were created overseas: the 527th Aggressor Squadron of the 10th TRW in the UK at RAF Alconbury and the 26th Aggressor Squadron, 3rd TFW in the Philippines at Clark AB.

The 425th TFTS was reassigned to the 405th Tactical Training Wing as of 29 August 1979 when the 58th TTW was re-designated at Luke AFB.

The last two F-5Es off the production line were delivered to Bahrain on 16 January 1987. However, a few more were assembled from spares, the last ones being delivered on 29 June 1989. That month the squadron's F-5 training program terminated after having produced 1,499 graduates, and the 425th was inactivated 1 September 1989

=== 82d Flying Training Wing ===
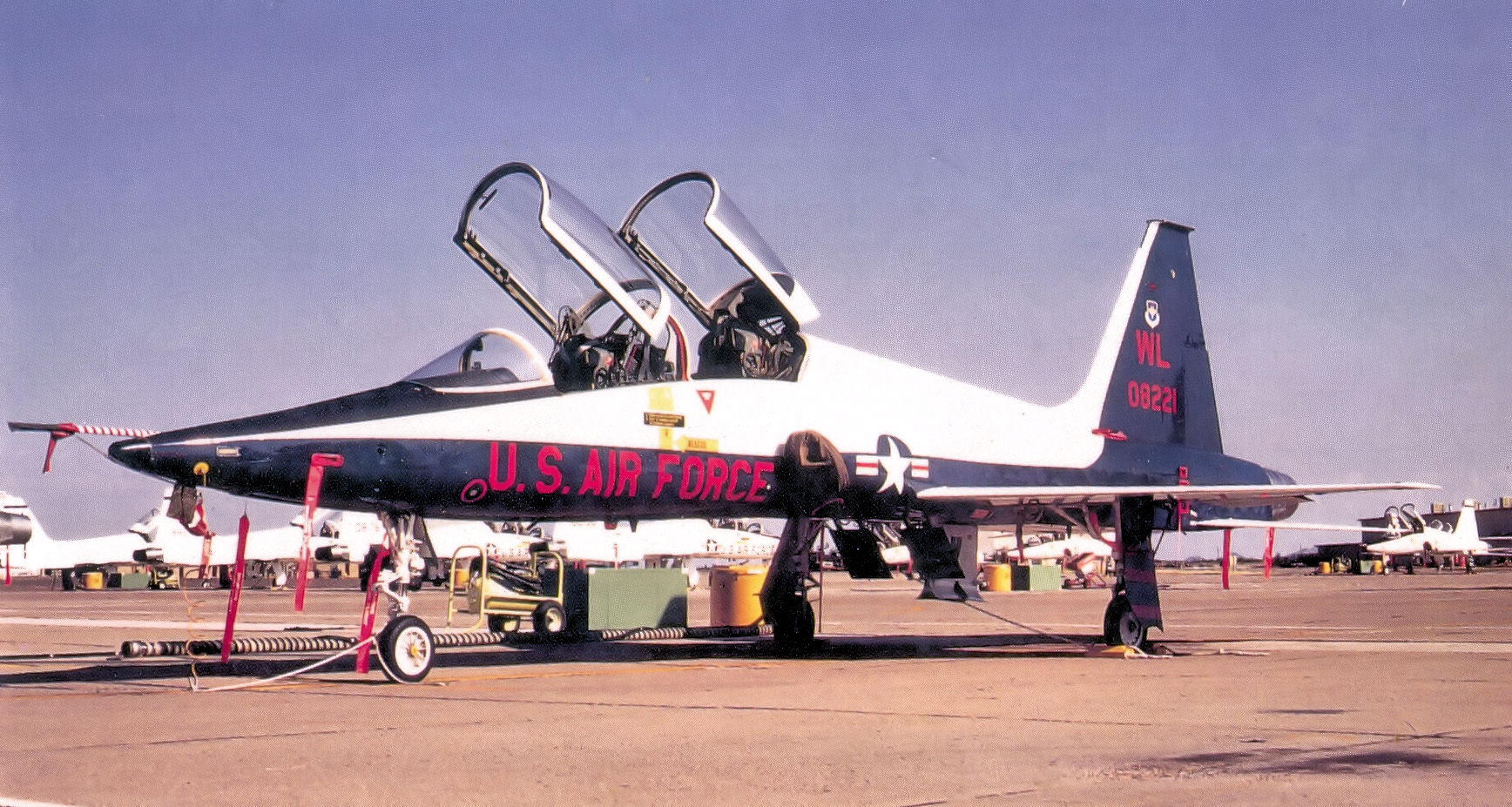
Northrop T-38A-50-NO Talon, AF Ser. No. 63-8221, 1986

In 1972 and 1973, ATC inactivated its four digit flying wings and replaced them with two-digit and three-digit wings. All of the newly activated units then had a combat lineage. At Williams the 3525th PTW was re-designated the 82d Flying Training Wing on 1 February. Squadrons were re-designated as follows:

- 3525th Pilot Training Squadron --> 96th Flying Training Squadron (T-37 Tweet)
- 3526th Pilot Training Squadron --> 97th Flying Training Squadron (T-38 Talon)

One of the most dominant features on the ATC landscape in 1974 was the serious jet fuel shortage the command had to contend with for much of the year. The shortage arose when the Organization of Petroleum Exporting Countries (OPEC) sent oil prices skyrocketing by proclaiming an oil embargo in response to the United States' support for Israel during the 1973 Yom Kippur War. Almost overnight, the price of aviation fuel tripled. To conserve fuel, ATC made numerous adjustments to the Undergraduate Pilot Training (UPT) syllabus, including a reduction in the number of sorties and flying hours and an increased reliance on the use of synthetic trainers.

In other efforts to cope with the crisis, the USAF initiated base closure and flying training wing inactivation actions at Craig AFB, Alabama and Webb AFB, Texas. ATC also cut overall pilot production goals by 18 percent, with USAF Officer Training School (OTS) not accepting any pilot or navigator applicants for FY 75, 76 or 77, and the Air Force Reserve Officer Training Corps (AFROTC) initiating a Reduction in Force (RIF) program, rescinding previously promised pilot training and navigator training slots for approximately 75% of those AFROTC cadets in commissioning Year Groups 75, 76 and 77 originally slated for flight training, re-directing them into non-aeronautically rated career fields or offering them opportunities to resign and transfer to officer flight training programs of the Navy, Marine Corps, Coast Guard or Army. Unaffected by the reductions, USAF Academy (USAFA) cadets/graduates of the same period continued to maintain their guaranteed allotment of approximately 75% of USAFA graduates assigned to UPT, 15% assigned to undergraduate navigator training, and the remaining 10% assigned to non-flying duties.

Female members of UPT Class 77-08 of Williams Air Force Base, May 1977

In September 1976, UPT class 77–08 at Williams became the first UPT class to include female student pilots. All were serving USAF officers at the rank of 2nd Lt, 1st Lt and Capt who had been previously performing non-flying duties in the Air Force. All were OTS and AFROTC graduates; none were USAFA graduates, since USAFA had only begun accepting females in June of that same year. On 30 November 1976, Capt Connie J. Engle became the first female UPT student to solo in a jet aircraft when she took off in her T-37.

In 1988, each UPT wing had two flying training squadrons one for T-37s and the other for T-38s, plus a student squadron. Air Training Command wanted to find out whether training could be conducted more effectively if student squadrons were eliminated. Instead, all training and administrative duties would be placed in the wings' two T-37 and two T-38 flying training squadrons. Officials at ATC chose the 82d Flying Training Wing at Williams as the test unit.

Air Training Command activated two additional squadrons at Williams the 98th Flying Training Squadron (T-37) and 99th Flying Training Squadron (T-38) on 1 June 1988. That gave the 82d a total of four flying training squadrons. However, by year's end, the test had shown that a fifth squadron was needed to provide operational support. The 82d became the first ATC wing to have five flying training squadrons when, on 1 September 1989, the command activated the 100th Flying Training Squadron (T-37).

However, it did not last long. In December 1990 ATC implemented the objective wing organization. The command's UPT wings kept four flying training squadrons each, two for T-37s and two for T-38s. The fifth squadron was redesignated as an operations support squadron, but fulfilled essentially the same functions as the old student squadron.

=== Closure in the 1990s ===
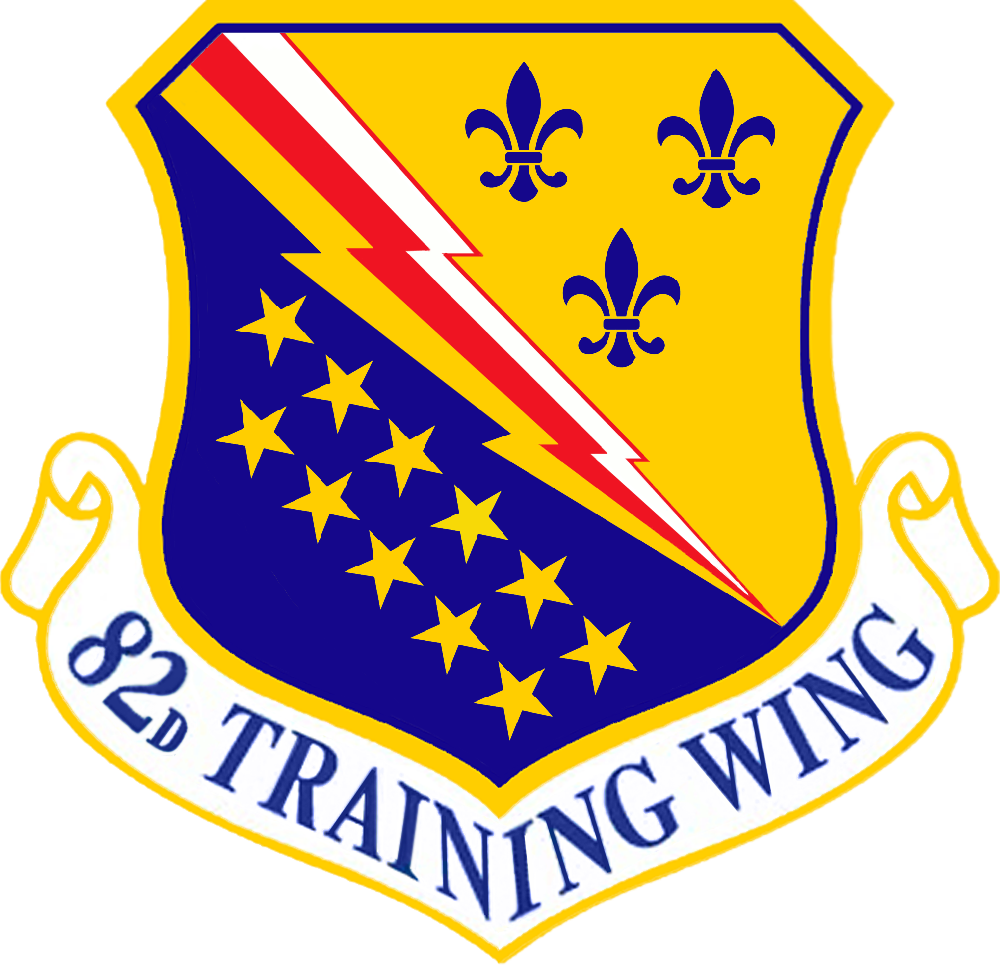
Emblem of the 82d Training Wing

Air Training Command was directed to close four of its training bases as a result of the 1993 Base Realignment and Closure Commission. The non-flying officer and enlisted technical training center at Chanute AFB, Illinois, and the sole undergraduate navigator training base at Mather AFB, California, were chosen to close in round one, with Chanute's technical training activities relocating to other USAF technical training centers or similar activities operated by the other services, and the latter UNT activity slated to relocate to Randolph AFB, Texas. The non-flying officer and enlisted technical training center at Lowry AFB, Colorado and Williams AFB as an undergraduate pilot training base were selected in round two.

Air Education and Training Command (AETC), the 1992 successor major command to ATC, inactivated the host unit at Williams AFB, the 82d Flying Training Wing, on 31 March 1993, redesignating it as the 82d Training Wing and transferring it to Sheppard AFB, Texas, where it would control non-flying officer and enlisted technical training, a role it continues to this day. This left the now independent 82d Operations Group to close Williams AFB. The command inactivated the operations group on 30 September 1993, and the approximately 4,127-acre (16.70 km^{2}) base was closed 30 September 1993.

At the official closing ceremony, two men, who as Boy Scouts in 1941 had raised the first flag at Williams Field when it was first officially opened, were there to officially lower the flag at its closing, after a combined fifty years of military service.

Today, Williams continues to serve the Phoenix area as a growing industrial park and commercial airport.

=== Major units assigned ===
- 89th Base HQ and Air Base Sq (advance detachment), 16 October 1941 – 4 December 1941
- 89th Base HQ and Air Base Sq, 4 December 1941 – 1 May 1944

Re-designated 3010th Army Air Force Base Unit, 1 May 1944
Re-designated 3010th Air Force Base Unit, 27 September 1947 – 28 August 1948

- Air Corps (Later Army Air Forces Advanced Flying School), 26 June 1941 – 1 June 1948
- 38th Flying Training Wing, 26 February 1945 – 16 June 1946
- Army Air Forces Pilot School (Specialized Fighter), 1 December 1945

Re-designated USAF Jet Pilot School, 1 June 1948 – 1 October 1949

- Army Air Forces Pilot School (Advanced Single-Engine), 6 July 1946

Re-designated USAF Basic Pilot School (Single Engine), 1 June 1948 – 8 January 1956

- 3525th Pilot Training Wing, 26 August 1948

Re-designated 4530th Combat Crew Training Wing, 1 July 1958
Re-designated 3525th Pilot Training Group, 1 October 1960 – 1 February 1973

- 1922nd Comm Squadron – Air Force Communications Service (AFCS) – Teletype, Crypto, Computer Maint., MARS Radio, Ground to Air Radio, Ground Radar, ILS, Localizer, Glideslope, Tacan; Lt. Col. Frank Ely – Sq. Commander (1968–1970)
- 4441st Combat Crew Training Squadron, 1 December 1963 (MAP F-5 Support)

Re-designated 425th Tactical Fighter Training Squadron, 15 October 1969 – 1 September 1989

- 4503rd Tactical Fighter Wing (Provisional), 22 July 1965 – 10 March 1966 (F-5 Skoshi Tiger)
- 82d Flying Training Wing, 1 February 1973 – 30 June 1993

=== Major commands assigned ===
- Air Corps Flying Training Comd, 23 January 1942
- AAF Flying Training Comd, 15 March 1942
- AAF Training Comd, 31 July 1943
- Tactical Air Command 1 July 1958 – 1 October 1960
- Air Training Command 1 July 1946 – 1 July 1958; 1 October 1960 – June 1993

== Historic sites ==
Historic resources of the Williams Air Force Base were identified in a 1995 study.

Seven separate objects or buildings were listed on the National Register of Historic Places on 19 June 1995. These are:

	Landmark name	Image	Location	Summary
1	Flagpole		The flagpole was once located at 10 St. between D and E Sts. at Williams Air Force Base. It is now located at the entrance of the Mesa Gateway Airport which is located on the grounds which once belonged to Williams AFB. 33°18′25″N 111°40′45″W	Flagpole erected in 1941 by Del E. Webb Construction Company
2	Water Pump Station and Water Tower		Northeastern corner of the junction of Innovation and Unity Aves. (once known as the Jct. of 12th and B Sts.) at Arizona State University at the Polytechnic campus in the grounds that once were part of Williams Air Force Base. 33°18′17″N 111°40′51″W	
3	Ammo Bunker (S-1007)		Southwest of Vosler Dr. (formerly Alaska Drive), at Arizona State University at the Polytechnic campus in the grounds that once was a part of Williams Air Force Base. 33°17′43″N 111°40′43″W	Built by Del E. Webb Construction Company in 1942
4	Ammo Bunker (S-1008)		Southwest of Vosler Dr. (formerly Alaska Drive), at Arizona State University at the Polytechnic campus in the grounds that once was a part of Williams Air Force Base. 33°17′39″N 111°40′40″W	Also built by Del E. Webb Construction Company in 1942
5	Civil Engineering Maintenance Shop		Northeastern corner of Unity Ave. (once known as Jct. of 11th and A Sts.), at Arizona State University at the Polytechnic campus in the grounds that once were part of Williams Air Force Base. 33°18′14″N 111°40′45″W	Built by Del E. Webb Construction Company in 1941
6	Demountable Hangar		Located at the North Apron of Mesa Gateway Airport in the grounds which once were part of Williams Air Force Base. 33°18′40″N 111°40′11″W	Built in 1942 and designed by Webb, Del E., Construction Company to resemble an enlisted aviator badge of the Army Air Force. Listed on the National Register of Historic Places in 1995, ref. #95000743.
7	Housing Storage Supply Warehouse		Northwestern corner of the junction of Innovation and Unity Aves. (once known as Jct. of 11th and A Sts.), at Arizona State University at the Polytechnic campus in the grounds that once belonged to Williams Air Force Base. 33°18′14″N 111°40′49″W	Built by Del E. Webb Construction Company in 1941

== Accidents and incidents ==
Williams Field suffered its first fatal accident in the six months it had been open as an advanced training base on 3 June 1942 when Curtiss-Wright AT-9-CS Fledgling, 41-5867, of the 333d School Squadron, crashed five miles NE of the base, apparently flown into the ground, killing John Clifford Eustice, 23, of Salt Lake City, Utah, and Irving C. Frank, 24, of Brooklyn, New York.

== See also ==
- Mesa Gateway Airport
- Air Training Command
- Arizona World War II Army Airfields
- 37th Flying Training Wing (World War II)
- List of airports in Arizona
- Arizona Commemorative Air Force Museum
