= Reefer Madness (Schlosser book) =

2003 book by Eric Schlosser

Reefer Madness: Sex, Drugs, and Cheap Labor in the American Black Market
- First edition
- Author: Eric Schlosser
- Language: English
- Publisher: Houghton Mifflin Harcourt
- Publication date: 2003
- Media type: print
- Pages: 320
- ISBN: 0-618-33466-1

Reefer Madness: Sex, Drugs, and Cheap Labor in the American Black Market is a book written by Eric Schlosser and published in 2003. The book is a look at the three pillars of the underground economy of the United States, estimated by Schlosser to be ten percent of U.S. GDP: marijuana, migrant labor, and pornography.

The book is divided into three chapters:

Chapter 1: Reefer Madness, Schlosser argues, based on usage, historical context, and consequences, for the decriminalization of marijuana.

Chapter 2: In the Strawberry Fields, he explores the exploitation of undocumented migrants as cheap labor, arguing that there should be better living arrangements and humane treatment of the undocumented migrants the U.S. is exploiting in the fields of California.

Chapter 3: An Empire of the Obscene details the history of pornography in U.S. culture, starting with the eventual business magnate Reuben Sturman. Schlosser closes by arguing that such a widespread black market can only undermine the law and is indicative of the discrepancy between accepted mainstream U.S. culture and its true nature.

== See also ==
- List of books about cannabis
