= Command and Control (book) =

2013 science history book by Eric Schlosser

- Author: Eric Schlosser
- Subject: Nuclear weapons
- Genre: Nonfiction
- Publisher: Penguin Press
- Publication date: September 17, 2013
- Pages: 632
- ISBN: 1594202273
- OCLC: 1285471375
- Dewey Decimal: 363.17/990976774
- LC Class: U264.3 .S45 2013

Command and Control: Nuclear Weapons, the Damascus Accident, and the Illusion of Safety is a 2013 nonfiction book by Eric Schlosser about the history of nuclear weapons systems and accidents involving nuclear weapons in the United States. Incidents Schlosser discusses in the book include the 1980 Damascus Titan missile explosion, the 1966 Palomares B-52 crash, and the 1961 Goldsboro B-52 crash. It was a finalist for the 2014 Pulitzer Prize for History. A documentary film based on the book aired as an episode of American Experience on PBS in early 2017.

== Synopsis ==
This book is a historical overview of the US nuclear weapons program with detailed narratives of nuclear weapons accidents, known as Broken Arrows.

In September 1980 at Launch Complex 374-7 near Damascus, Arkansas a dropped wrench socket ruptured the first stage fuel tank of a Titan II missile. The resulting leak led to the 1980 Damascus Titan missile explosion which expelled a nine-megaton W-53 nuclear warhead from the missile silo, though the warhead did not detonate.

Schlosser uses the framework of the Damascus incident to build the seventy-year history of the development, maintenance and mismanagement of US and global nuclear arsenals. He covers the Manhattan Project, the Cold War, and the spread of nuclear capability worldwide. The book also describes other broken arrow incidents.

In January 1961, a B-52 Stratofortress broke apart mid-air near Goldsboro, North Carolina, carrying two Mark 39 nuclear bombs. One bomb's arming sequence was almost fully complete, while the other was recovered intact.

In January 1966, another B-52 collided with a KC-135 Stratotanker during mid-air refueling over Palomares, Spain. The accident dropped four B28 nuclear bombs, spreading plutonium across the countryside.

Through these accounts, Schlosser highlights institutional cover-ups and examines recurring tensions between operational control and weapon reliability.

== Critical reception ==
A review in The New York Times described it as a "disquieting but riveting" book and Schlosser as a "better reporter than policy analyst".

Speaking of the book, domestic security adviser Lee H. Hamilton said, "The lesson of this powerful and disturbing book is that the world's nuclear arsenals are not as safe as they should be. We should take no comfort in our skill and good fortune in preventing a nuclear catastrophe, but urgently extend our maximum effort to assure that a nuclear weapon does not go off by accident, mistake, or miscalculation."

== See also ==
- List of military nuclear accidents
- List of accidents and incidents involving military aircraft
- Lists of nuclear disasters and radioactive incidents
- Radiation
- United States military nuclear incident terminology
