= Gila River Memorial Airport =

Airport in Maricopa County, Arizona, US (1942–1983)

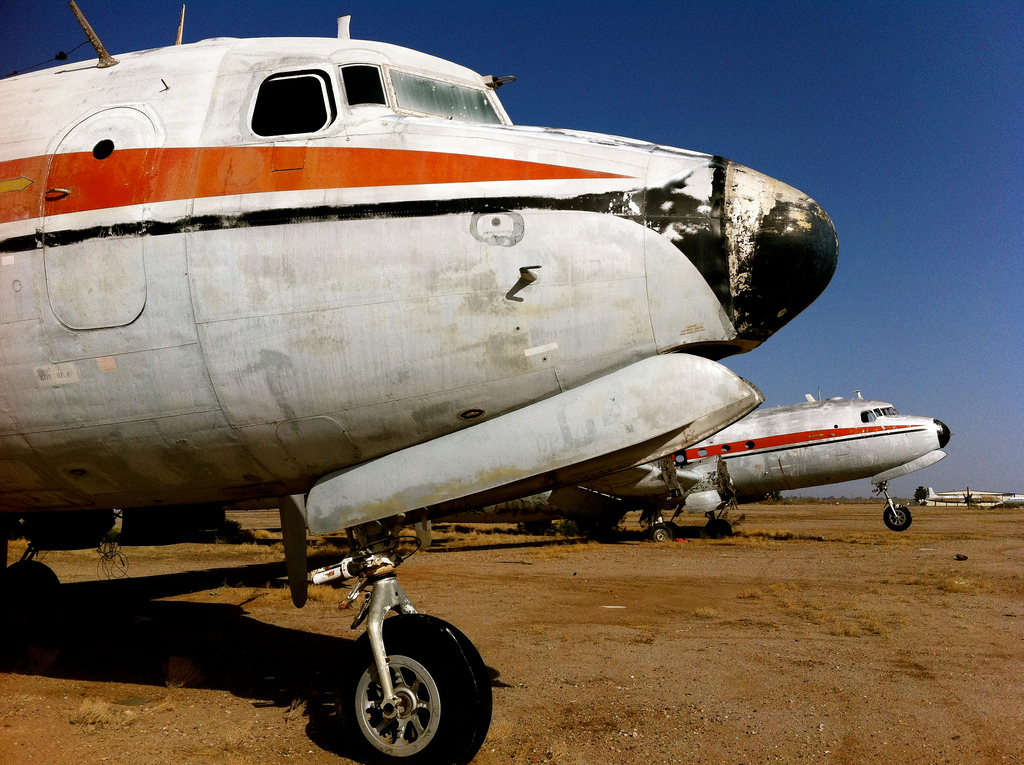
- Abandoned Douglas DC-4 airliners, converted to sprayers, at Gila River Memorial Airport
- IATA: none; ICAO: none

Summary
- Airport type: Private
- Owner: Gila River Airport Authority
- Location: Gila River Indian Reservation, Arizona
- Elevation AMSL: 1,185 ft (361 m)
- Coordinates: 33°14′36.18″N 111°54′57.11″W

Map
- Location within Arizona Location within the United States

Runways
Direction	Length		Surface
Direction	ft	m	Surface
12/30	8,560 x 75	2,609 x 23	Asphalt, bad condition
3/21	5,200 x 200	1,585 x 61	Asphalt, poor condition and in state of abandonment

Gila River Memorial Airport was a private-use airport owned and operated by the Gila River Indian Community, located 4 miles (3.5 nmi; 6.4 km) southwest of the central business district of Chandler, in Maricopa County, Arizona, United States. It was used for cropdusting and air charter operations, with no scheduled commercial services.

== History ==
Gila River Memorial Airport was built in 1942 as Williams Auxiliary Army Airfield #5, one of several satellite airfields for Williams Army Airfield. After the war, it was renamed Goodyear Air Force Auxiliary Airfield, with its triangular configuration modified to accommodate early jet aircraft of the 1950s. During the 1960s, it passed to civilian control as Goodyear Airport, then as Memorial Airfield. No hangar space existed until the late 1970s, when the airport began playing host to older piston-engined transport aircraft, many of which had been converted for use as air tankers. The majority of the converted aircraft were operated by Biegert Aviation. By the 1990s, it had become an aircraft boneyard.

By 2007, the Gila River Indian Community had assumed control of the airfield, renaming it Gila River Memorial Airport, and all commercial tenants were evicted from the property in the hopes of turning it into a casino. In 2008, numerous aircraft remained, including C-54s, DC-4s, DC-7s, PV-2s, and a Howard 500. Many of them have since been removed, with some of the old airport outbuildings dismantled, and further plans to expand and develop the airport in progress as of 2009.

== Facilities and aircraft ==
=== Facilities ===
Gila River Memorial Airport covers 1,345 acres (544 ha) and has two asphalt runways:

- 03/21 is 5,200 ft × 200 ft (1,585 m × 61 m)
- 12/30 is 8,560 ft × 75 ft (2,609 m × 23 m)

The last recorded aircraft operations were for the 12-month period ending November 16, 1983. These statistics show that the airport had about 25,550 aircraft operations, an average of 70 per day. These statistics show that the traffic was made up of 98% general aviation aircraft and 2% military aircraft.

=== Aircraft ===
61 aircraft were based at this airport: 31 single-engine and 30 multi-engine.

== Gallery ==
Gila River Memorial Airport
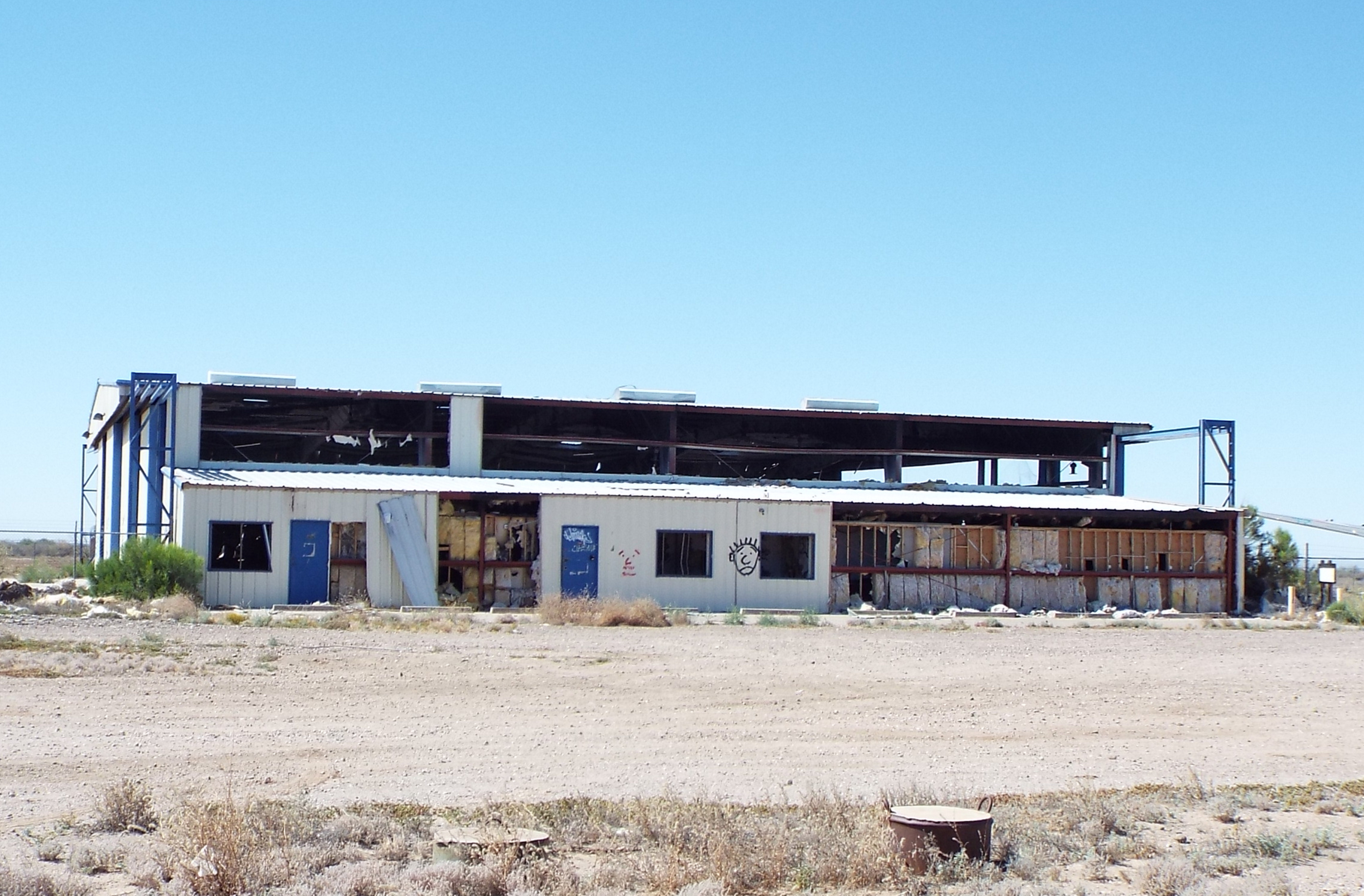
Abandoned terminal

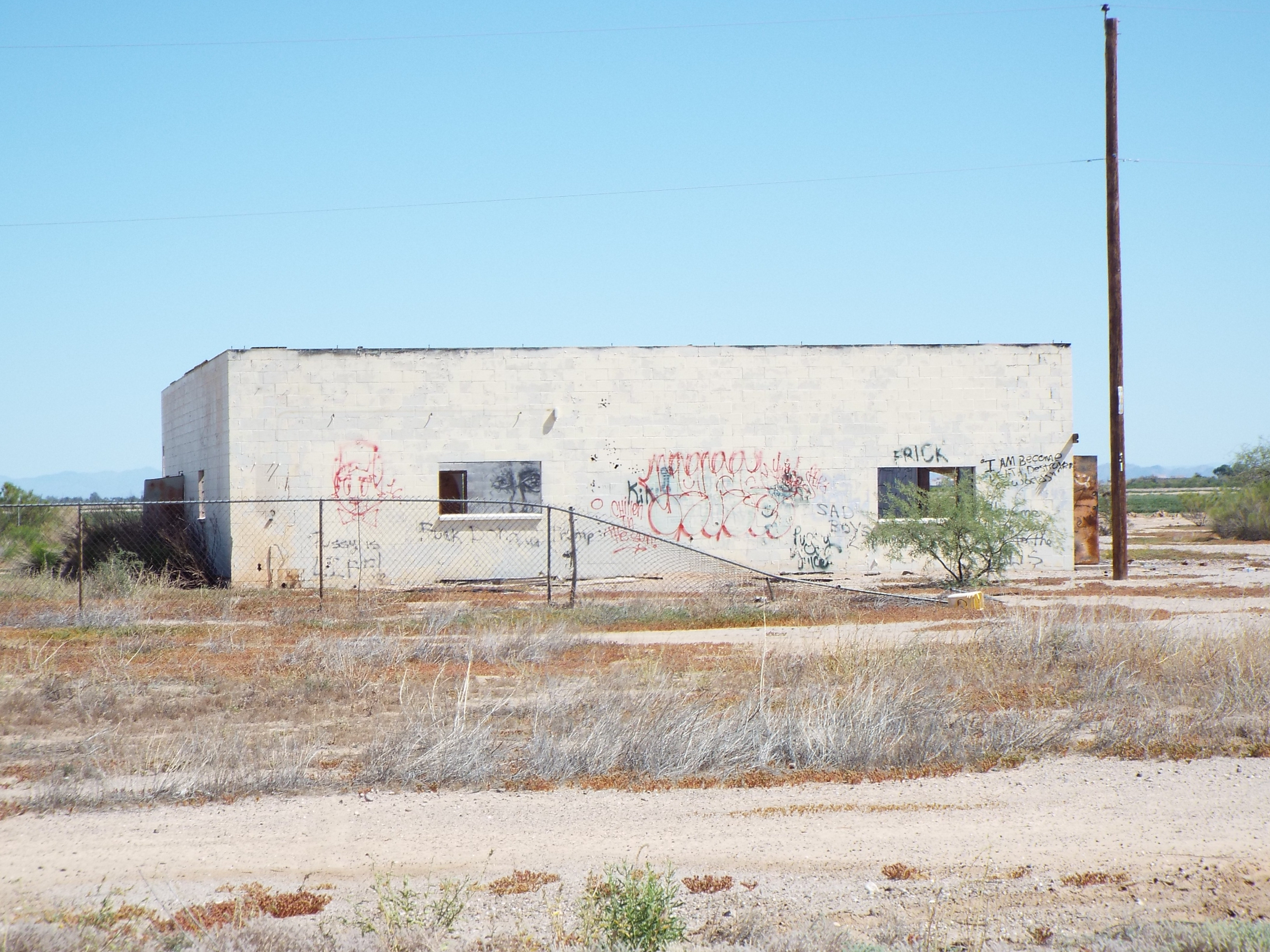
Airport building

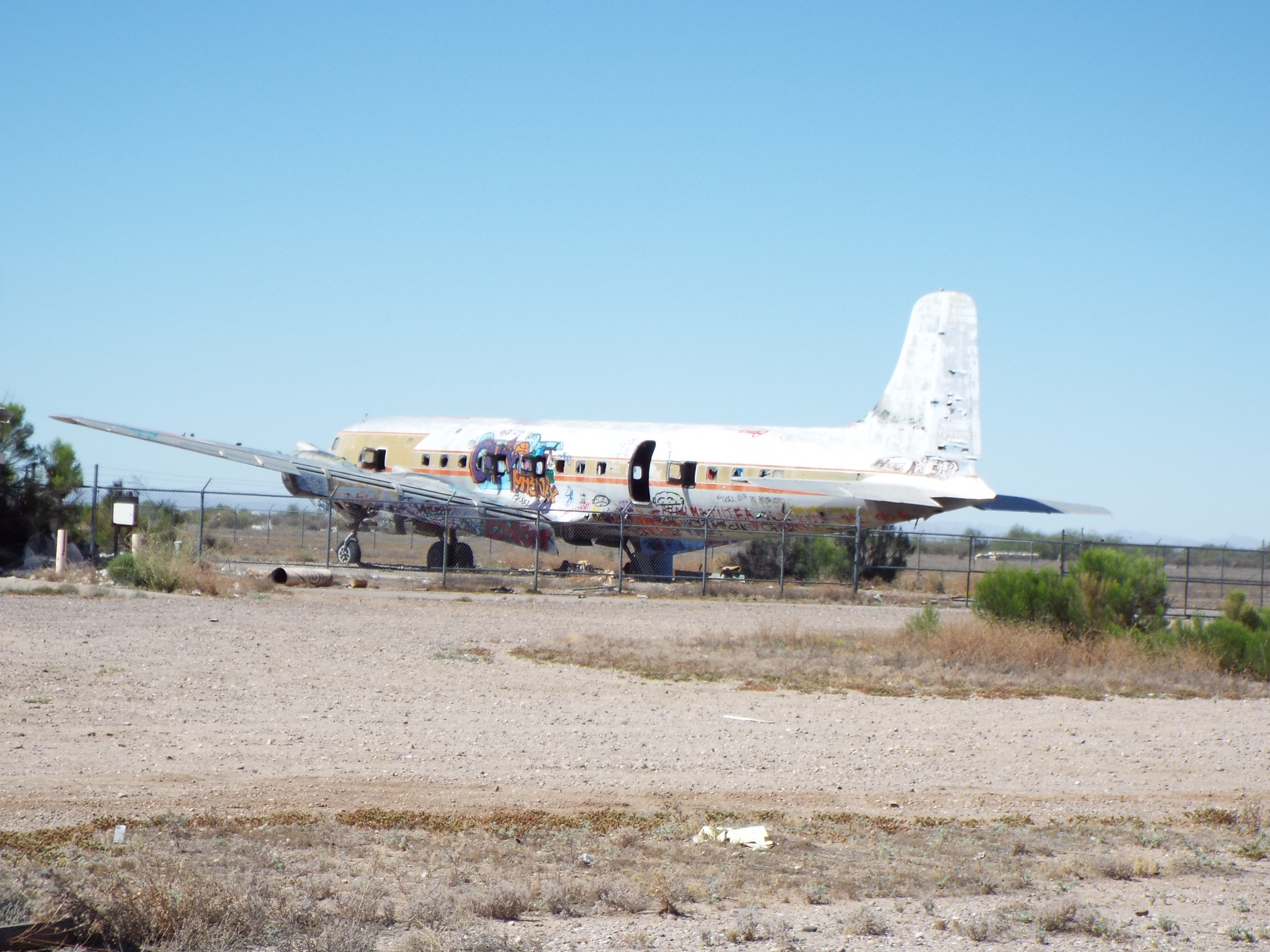
Abandoned 1957 Douglas DC-7

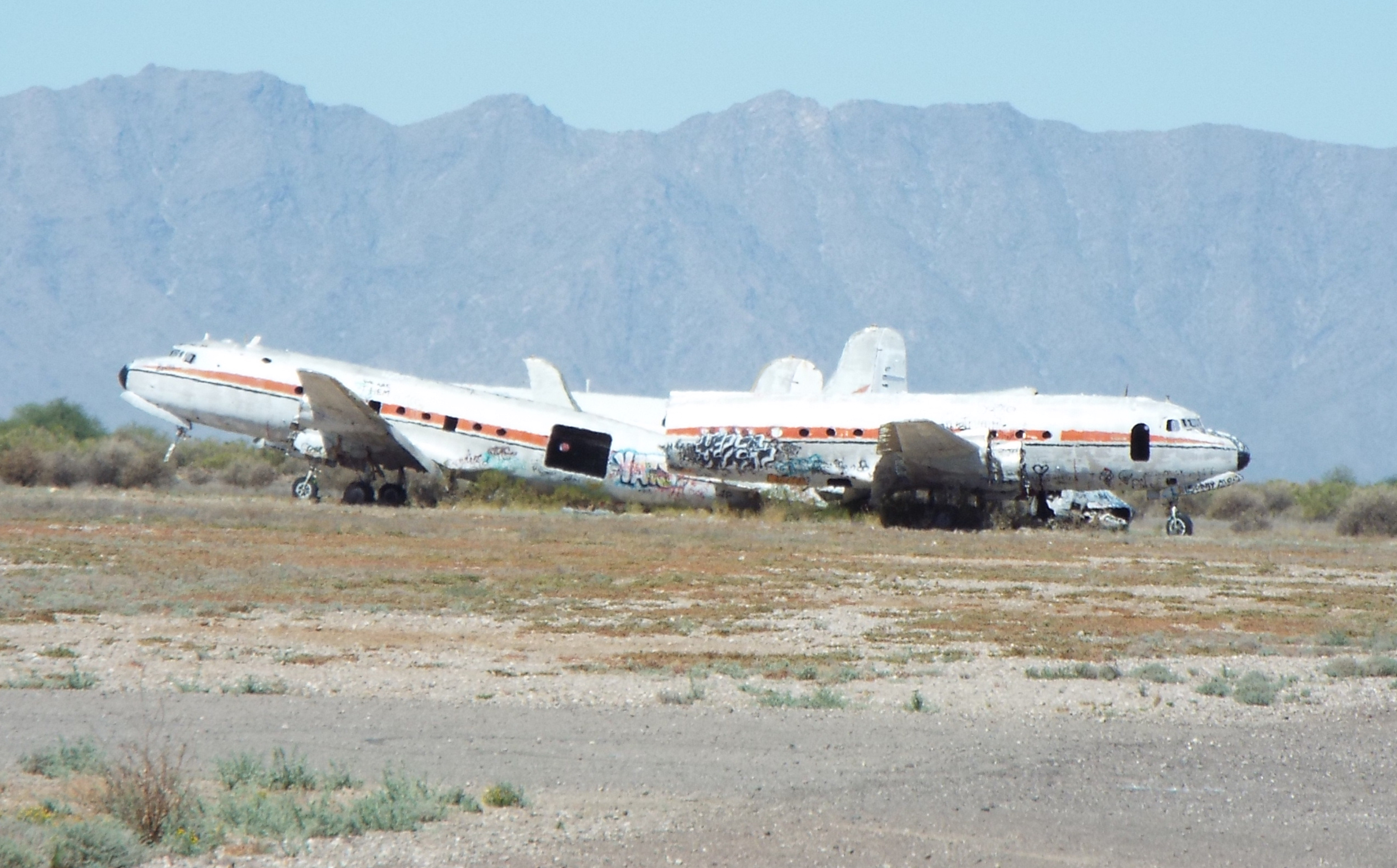
Four abandoned 1942 DC-4s

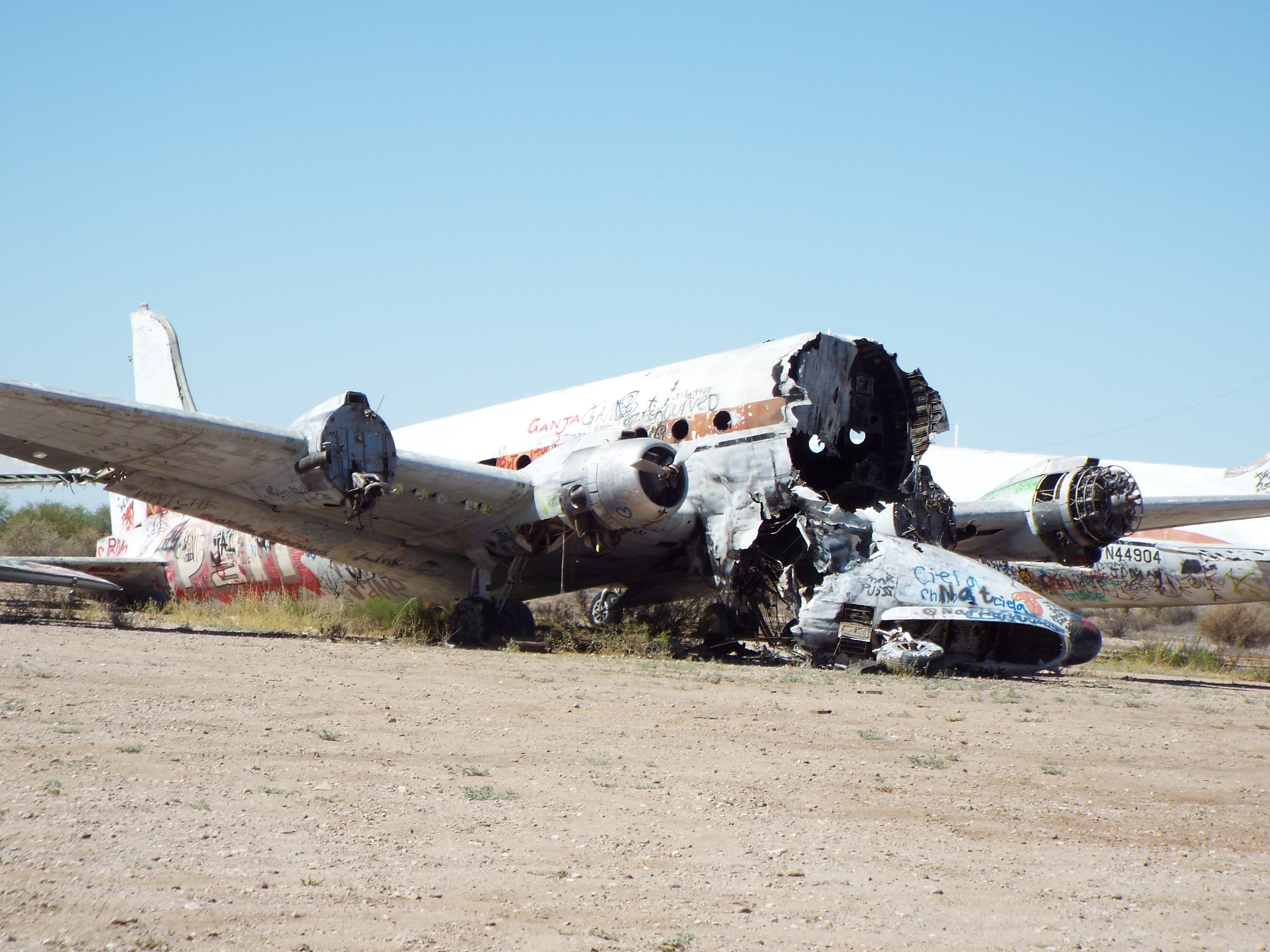
Abandoned 1942 DC-4

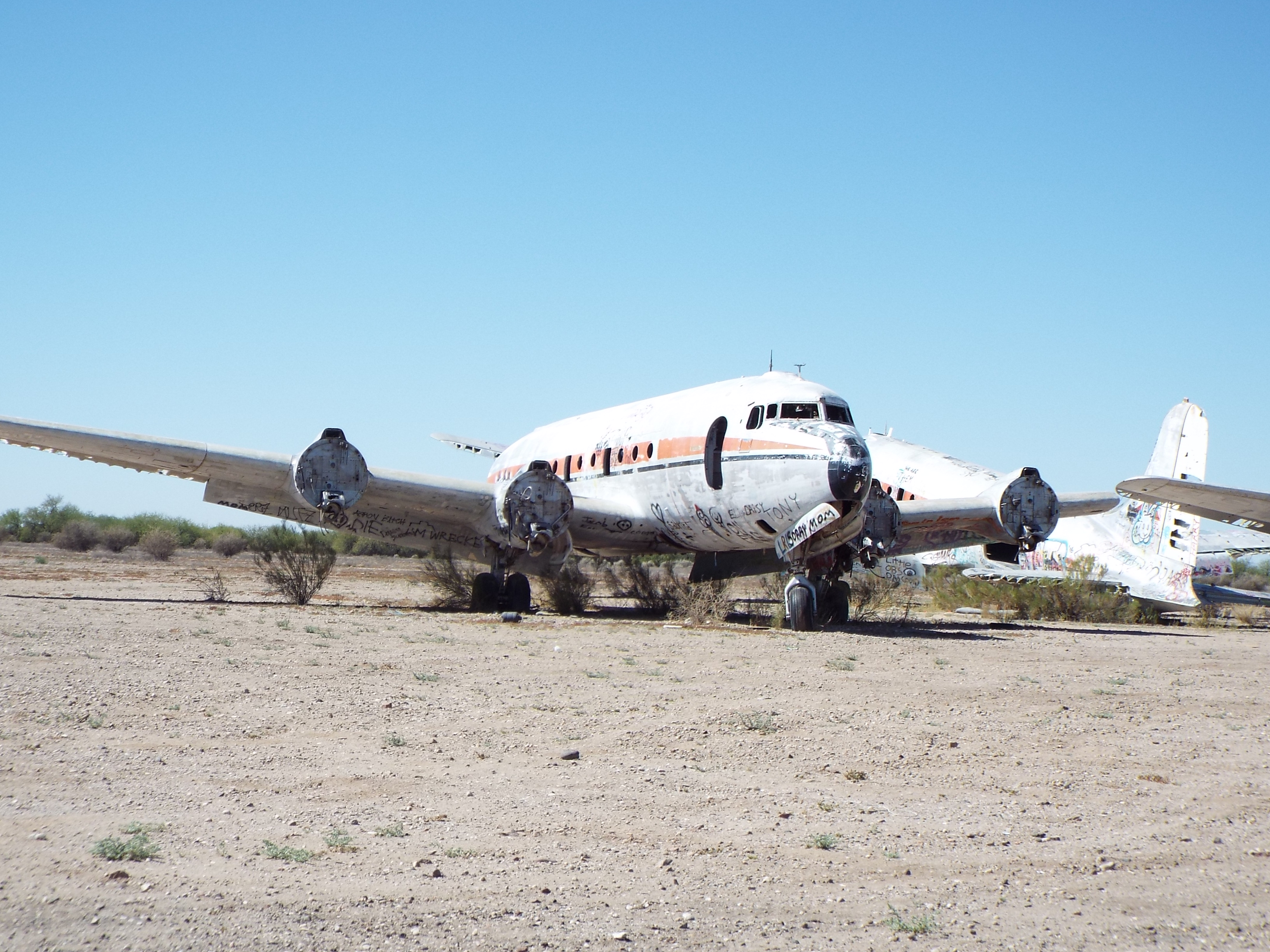
Abandoned 1942 DC-4

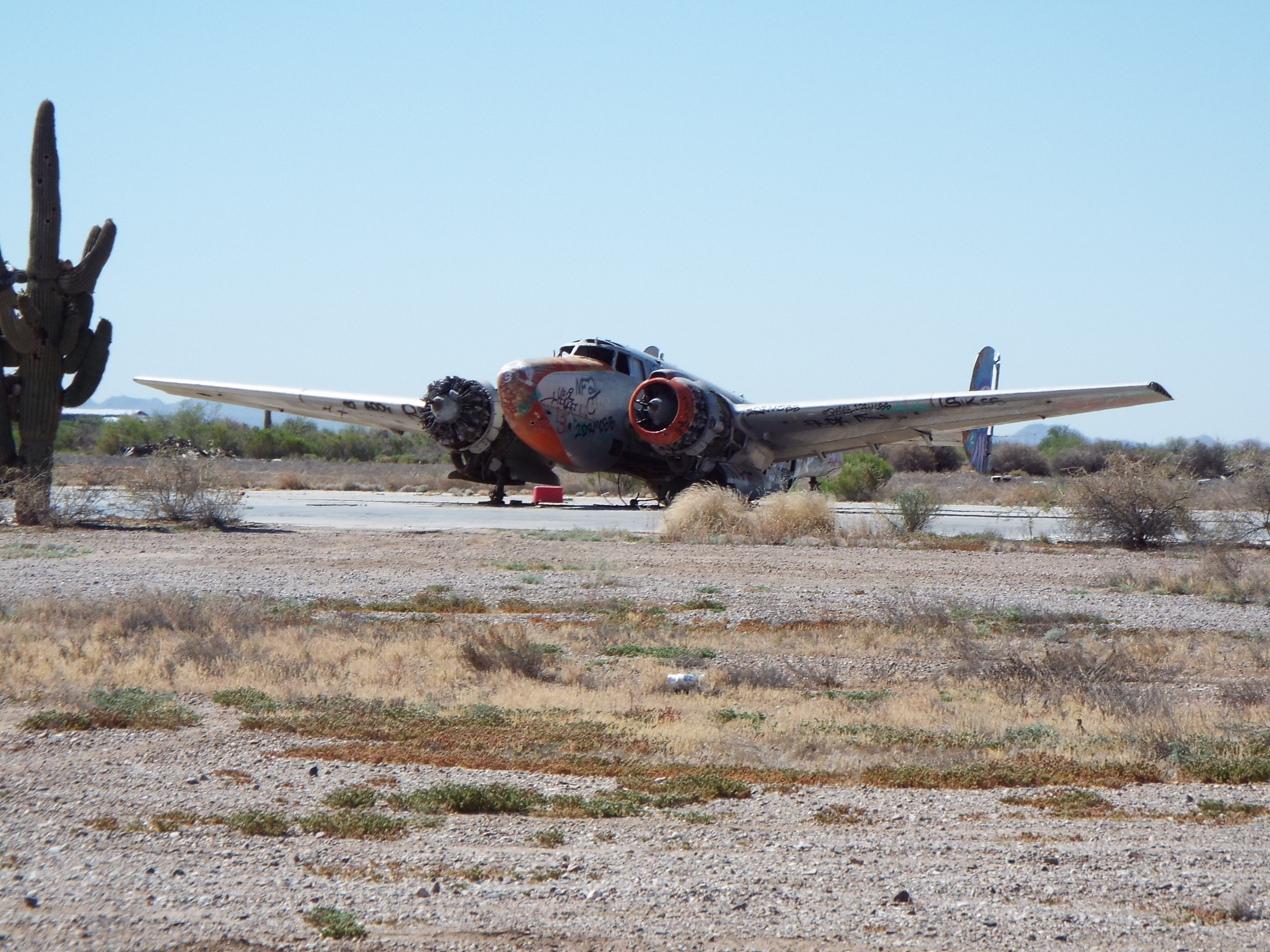
Abandoned 1945 Lockheed PV-2D Harpoon

== See also ==
- List of airports in Arizona
