= San Carlos Apache Airport =

Airport in Gila County, Arizona

- IATA: GLB; ICAO: none; FAA LID: P13

Summary
- Airport type: Public
- Owner: San Carlos Apache Tribe
- Serves: Globe, Arizona
- Elevation AMSL: 3,261 ft / 994 m
- Coordinates: 33°21′11″N 110°40′02″W

Map
- Location of airport in Arizona

Runways
Direction	Length		Surface
Direction	ft	m	Surface
9/27	6,500	1,981	Asphalt

Statistics (2011)
- Aircraft operations: 1,900
- Based aircraft: 4
- Source: Federal Aviation Administration

San Carlos Apache Airport (IATA: GLB, FAA LID: P13) is a public use airport located 8 miles (7.0 nmi; 13 km), southeast of the central business district of Globe, a city in Gila County, Arizona, United States. The airport is owned by the San Carlos Apache Tribe. It is included in the National Plan of Integrated Airport Systems for 2011–2015, which categorized it as a general aviation airport.

== Facilities and aircraft ==
San Carlos Apache Airport covers an area of 185 acres (75 ha) at an elevation of 3,261 feet (994 m) above mean sea level. It has one runway designated 9/27 with an asphalt surface measuring 6,500 by 100 feet (1,981 x 30 m).

For the 12-month period ending April 24, 2011, the airport had 1,900 general aviation aircraft operations, an average of 158 per month. At that time there were four single-engine aircraft based at this airport.

== See also ==
- List of airports in Arizona
