= Eric Schlosser =

American journalist and author (born 1959)

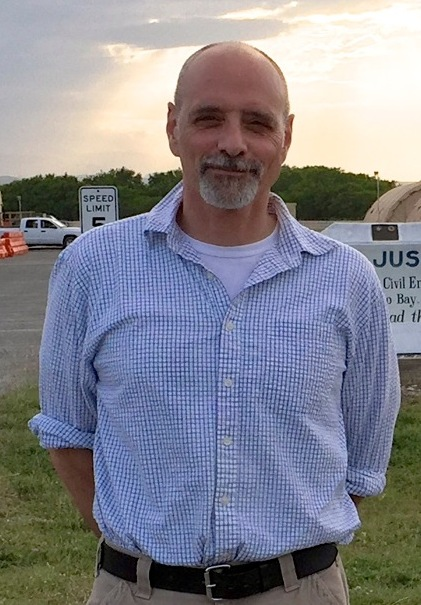
- Schlosser in 2016
- Born: Eric Matthew Schlosser; August 17, 1959 (age 67); New York City, U.S.
- Education: Princeton University (BA); Oriel College, Oxford (MLitt)
- Occupation: Investigative writer
- Spouse: Shauna Jean Redford (m. 1985)
- Children: 2
- Parent: Herbert Schlosser (father)
- Relatives: Robert Redford (father-in-law)
- Writing career
- Period: 1995—present
- Genre: Non-fiction
- Notable works: Fast Food Nation (2001); Reefer Madness (2003); Command and Control: Nuclear Weapons, the Damascus Accident, and the Illusion of Safety (2013)

Eric Matthew Schlosser (born August 17, 1959) is an American journalist and food writer. He is known for his books Fast Food Nation (2001), Reefer Madness (2003), and Command and Control: Nuclear Weapons, the Damascus Accident, and the Illusion of Safety (2013).

== Early life ==
Schlosser was born in New York City; he spent his childhood there and in Los Angeles. His parents are Judith (née Gassner) and Herbert Schlosser, a former Wall Street lawyer who turned to broadcasting later in his career, eventually becoming president of NBC in 1974 and later becoming a vice president of RCA. He is of Jewish descent.

== Education ==
Schlosser graduated with an A.B. in history from Princeton University in Princeton, New Jersey in 1982 after completing a 148 pages long senior thesis titled "Academic Freedom during the McCarthy Era: Anti-Communism, Conformity and Princeton." He then earned a Master of Letters in British Imperial History from Oriel College, Oxford. He wrote two plays, Americans (1985) and We the People (2007).

== Personal life ==
He is married to Shauna Redford, daughter of actor Robert Redford. They have two children.

== Career ==
Schlosser started his career as a journalist with The Atlantic Monthly in Boston. He quickly gained recognition with investigative pieces, earning two awards within two years of joining the staff: he won the National Magazine Award for reporting in his two-part series "Reefer Madness" and "Marijuana and the Law" (The Atlantic Monthly, August and September 1994). He won the Sidney Hillman Foundation award for his article "In the Strawberry Fields" (The Atlantic Monthly, November 19, 1995).

External videos
- Presentation by Schlosser on Fast Food Nation at the 92nd Street Y, May 31, 2001, C-SPAN
- Booknotes interview with Schlosser on Reefer Madness, June 15, 2003, C-SPAN
- Presentation by Schlosser on Reefer Madness at the Miami Book Fair, November 9, 2003, C-SPAN
- After Words interview with Schlosser on Command and Control, September 27, 2013, C-SPAN

Schlosser wrote Fast Food Nation (2001), an exposé on the unsanitary and discriminatory practices of the fast food industry. Fast Food Nation evolved from a two-part article in Rolling Stone. The book won the 2002 Firecracker Alternative Book Award for Nonfiction. Schlosser helped adapt his book into a 2006 film directed by Richard Linklater. The film opened November 19, 2006. Chew On This (2006), co-written with Charles Wilson, is an adaptation of the book for younger readers. Fortune called Fast Food Nation the "Best Business Book of the Year" in 2001.

His 2003 book Reefer Madness discusses the history and trade of marijuana, the use of migrant workers in California strawberry fields, the American pornography industry and the history of said industry. William F. Buckley, Jr. gave Reefer Madness a favorable review as did BusinessWeek.

Schlosser's book Command and Control: Nuclear Weapons, the Damascus Accident, and the Illusion of Safety was published in September 2013. It focuses on the 1980 Damascus Titan missile explosion, a non-nuclear explosion of a Titan II missile near Damascus, Arkansas. The New Yorker's Louis Menand called it "excellent" and "hair-raising". He said that "Command and Control is how nonfiction should be written." It was a finalist for the 2014 Pulitzer Prize for History.

Schlosser has been working on a book on the American prison system, which has been over 10 years in the making.

== Bibliography ==
- Schlosser, Eric; Wilson, Charles (2006). Chew on this: Everything You Don't Want to Know about Fast Food. Houghton Mifflin Harcourt. ISBN 978-0-618-59394-1.
- Jayaraman, Saru; Schlosser, Eric (February 12, 2013). Behind the Kitchen Door. Cornell University Press. ISBN 978-0-8014-6759-2.

== Films and awards ==
Schlosser appeared in an interview for the DVD of Morgan Spurlock's Super Size Me, having a one-on-one discussion with the filmmaker about the fast-food industry. Schlosser did not appear in the film itself. He was interviewed by Franny Armstrong, a British film director. in 2005 and is a feature interviewee in her film McLibel. He appeared in the 2008 documentary, Food, Inc., and the 2023 sequel Food, Inc. 2 with author and journalist Michael Pollan.

Schlosser served as co-executive producer on the 2007 film There Will Be Blood. In 2014, he was an executive producer of the farmworker documentary Food Chains, a credit he shared with Eva Longoria. They both won a James Beard Foundation Award for their roles. Schlosser also shared a director credit for the multimedia installation entitled "the bomb", an experimental film about nuclear weaponry coupled with a live score by The Acid.
