= HMI =

HMI may refer to:

== Companies and organizations ==
- Hahn-Meitner-Institut, now Helmholtz-Zentrum Berlin, a German research institute
- Hanson Musical Instruments, a manufacturer of electric guitars
- Hartz Mountain Industries, an American holding company
- HD Mining International, a mining company in Vancouver, British Columbia, Canada
- Hetrick-Martin Institute, an LGBT youth organization in New York City
- High Mountain Institute, in Leadville, Colorado, United States
- Himalayan Mountaineering Institute, in Darjeeling, India
- HMI Hotel Group, a hotel management company in Japan
- Holistic Management International, an American non-profit organization
- HornAfrik Media Inc, a media organization based in Mogadishu, Somalia
- Hotel Meliá, Inc., in Ponce, Puerto Rico
- Houston Mechatronics, Inc, see Houston Mechatronics, Inc
- Hualien Media International, a global entertainment company in Taipei, Taiwan
- Muslim Students' Association (Indonesia)

== Technology ==
- Helioseismic and Magnetic Imager, on the Solar Dynamics Observatory spacecraft
- hexamethyleneimine, an organic compound
- Human–machine interaction
- Human–machine interface
- Hydrargyrum medium-arc iodide lamp, used for stage lighting

== Other uses ==
- Hami Airport, in Xinjiang, China
- Hammond-Whiting station, in Indiana
- Her Majesty's Inspectorate of Education, in Scotland
- Northern Huishui Miao language, spoken in China
