= Land rehabilitation =

Part of environmental remediation

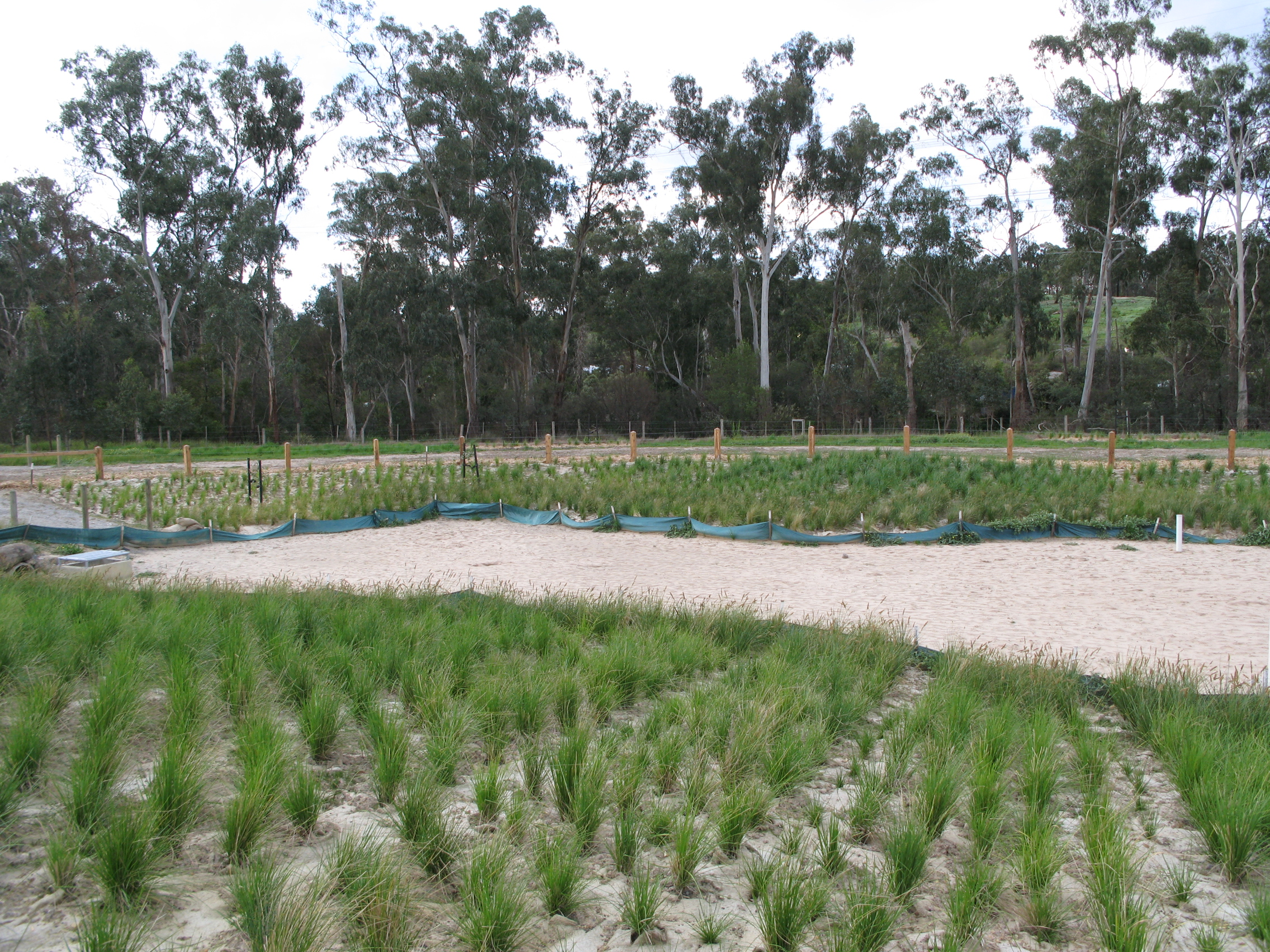
Recently constructed wetland regeneration in Australia, on a site previously used for agriculture.

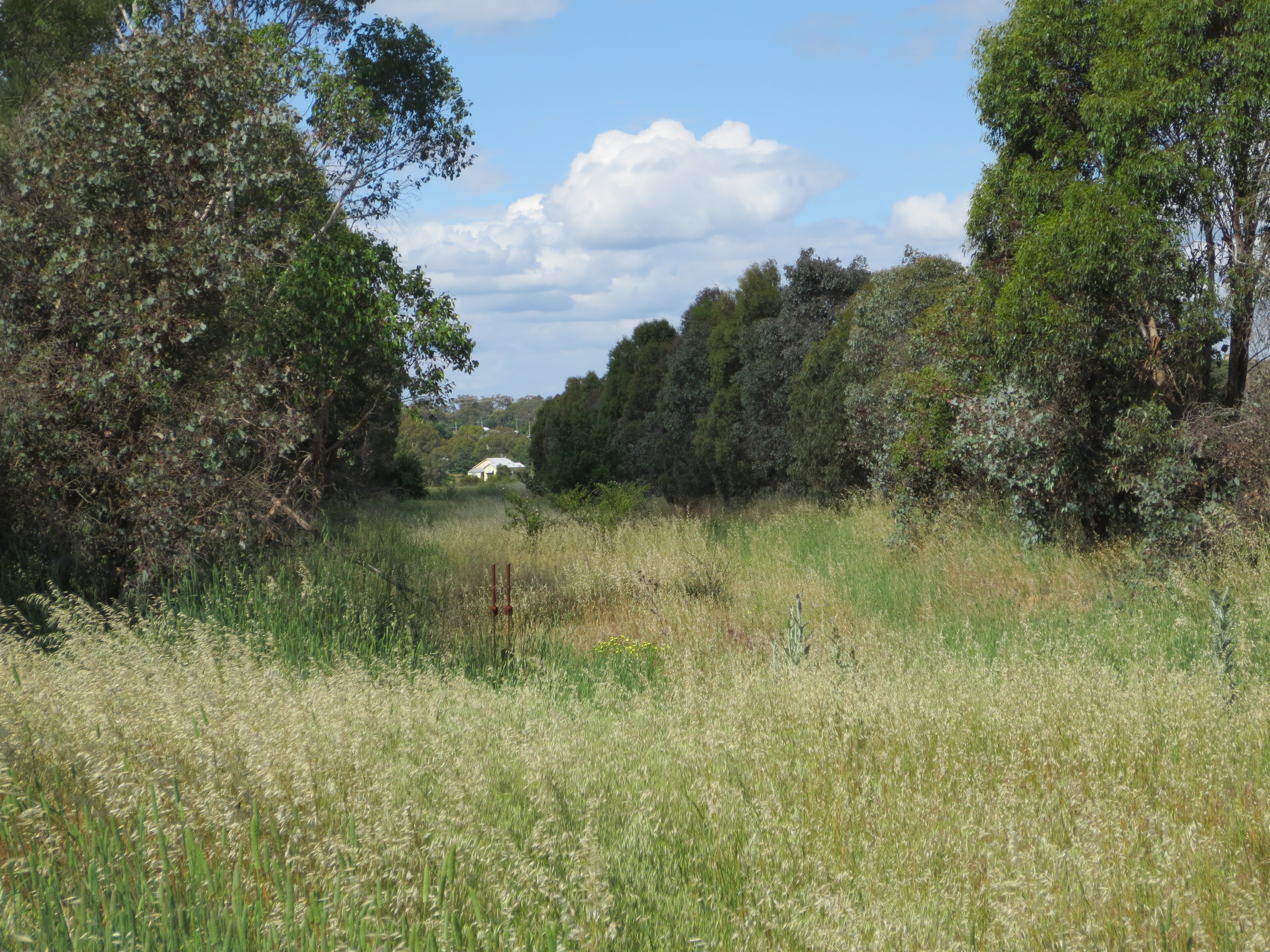
Regenerated habitat for the superb parrot on the abandoned Boorowa railway line.

Land rehabilitation as a part of environmental remediation is the process of returning the land in a given area to some degree of its former state, after some process (industry, natural disasters, etc.) has resulted in its damage. Many projects and developments will result in the land becoming degraded, for example mining, farming and forestry. It is crucial that governments and businesses act proactively by working on improvement, lay out rehabilitation standards and ensure that decisions on mediation should be based around value judgment for higher sustainability in the future.

In some jurisdictions, including parts of the United States, the term "reclamation" can refer to land rehabilitation, as in returning disturbed lands to an improved state, instead of the land fill of water bodies. In Alberta, Canada, for example, reclamation is defined by the provincial government as "The process of reconverting disturbed land to its former or other productive uses."

== Mine rehabilitation ==
Modern mine rehabilitation aims to minimize and mitigate the environmental effects of modern mining, which may in the case of open pit mining involve movement of significant volumes of rock. Rehabilitation management is an ongoing process and often includes the backfilling of open-pit mines.

After mining finishes, the mine area must undergo rehabilitation.

- Waste dumps are contoured to flatten them out, to further stabilize them against erosion.
- If the ore contains sulfides it is usually covered with a layer of clay to prevent access of rain and oxygen from the air, which can oxidize the sulfides to produce sulfuric acid.
- Landfills are covered with topsoil, and vegetation is planted to help consolidate the material.
- Dumps are usually fenced off to prevent livestock denuding them of vegetation.
- The open pit is then surrounded with a fence, to prevent access, and it generally eventually fills up with groundwater.
- Tailings dams are left to evaporate, then covered with waste rock, clay if need be, and soil, which is planted to stabilize it.

For underground mines, rehabilitation is not always a significant problem or cost. This is because of the higher grade of the ore and lower volumes of waste rock and tailings. In some situations, stopes are backfilled with concrete slurry using waste, so that minimal waste is left at surface.

The removal of plant and infrastructure is not always part of a rehabilitation programme, as many old mine plants have cultural heritage and cultural value. Often in gold mines, rehabilitation is performed by scavenger operations which treat the soil within the plant area for spilled gold using modified placer mining gravity collection plants.

Also possible is that the section of the mine that is below ground, is kept and used to provide heating, water and/or methane. Heat extraction can be done using heat exchangers, that convey the heat to a nearby city (hence making it be used for district heating purposes. Water can be harvested from the mine as well (mines are often filled with water once the mine has been shut down and the pumps no longer operate). Methane is also often present in the mine shafts, in small quantities (often around 0.1%). This can still be recovered though with specialised systems. An added advantage of recovering the methane finally is that the methane does not come into the atmosphere, and so does not contribute to global warming. As research methods continue to expand the focus for future studies should be directed at the correlation that can be observed between biodiversity, mine ecological restoration and carbon sequestration.

== Mine rehabilitation market ==
Depending on the country, mining companies are regulated by federal and state bodies to rehabilitate the affected land and to restore biodiversity offset areas around the mines.

Mine rehabilitation, a legal obligation for mining companies in Australia for which they are required to pay bonds, could be a source of considerable employment generation and economic investment in regional areas, if governments were willing to enforce the laws covering the process.

Before mining activities begin, a rehabilitation security bond must be provided. The Australian mine rehabilitation bonds totals $9.49 billion, with the state of NSW bond totaling $2.68bn in 2019. The size of mining security bonds has been questioned by NSW's Auditor General as being insufficient to cover the complete costs associated with mine rehabilitation activities.

In addition to operational mine rehabilitation activities, often termed 'progressive rehabilitation', abandoned mines are also restored. The financing for restoring abandoned mines is drawn from operating mines and public sources. The cost of reclaiming the abandoned mines in the US is estimated at $9.6bn.

== See also ==
- Land restoration – Process of restoring land to a different state
- Forest restoration – Actions to reinstate forest health
- Reforestation – Method for land and forest regeneration
- Prairie restoration – Conservation efforts focused on prairie lands
- Restoration ecology – Scientific study of renewing and restoring ecosystems
- Environmental remediation – Removal of pollution from soil, groundwater, etc
- Holistic management – Agricultural technique
- Mine reclamation – Restoration of land after mineral extraction
- Land recycling – Reuse of abandoned buildings or sites
- Soil salinity control – Controlling the problem of soil salinity
- Watertable control – Use of drainage to control the groundwater level in an area
- Land reclamation – Creating new land from oceans, seas, riverbeds or lakes
