= Prairie restoration =

Conservation efforts focused on prairie lands

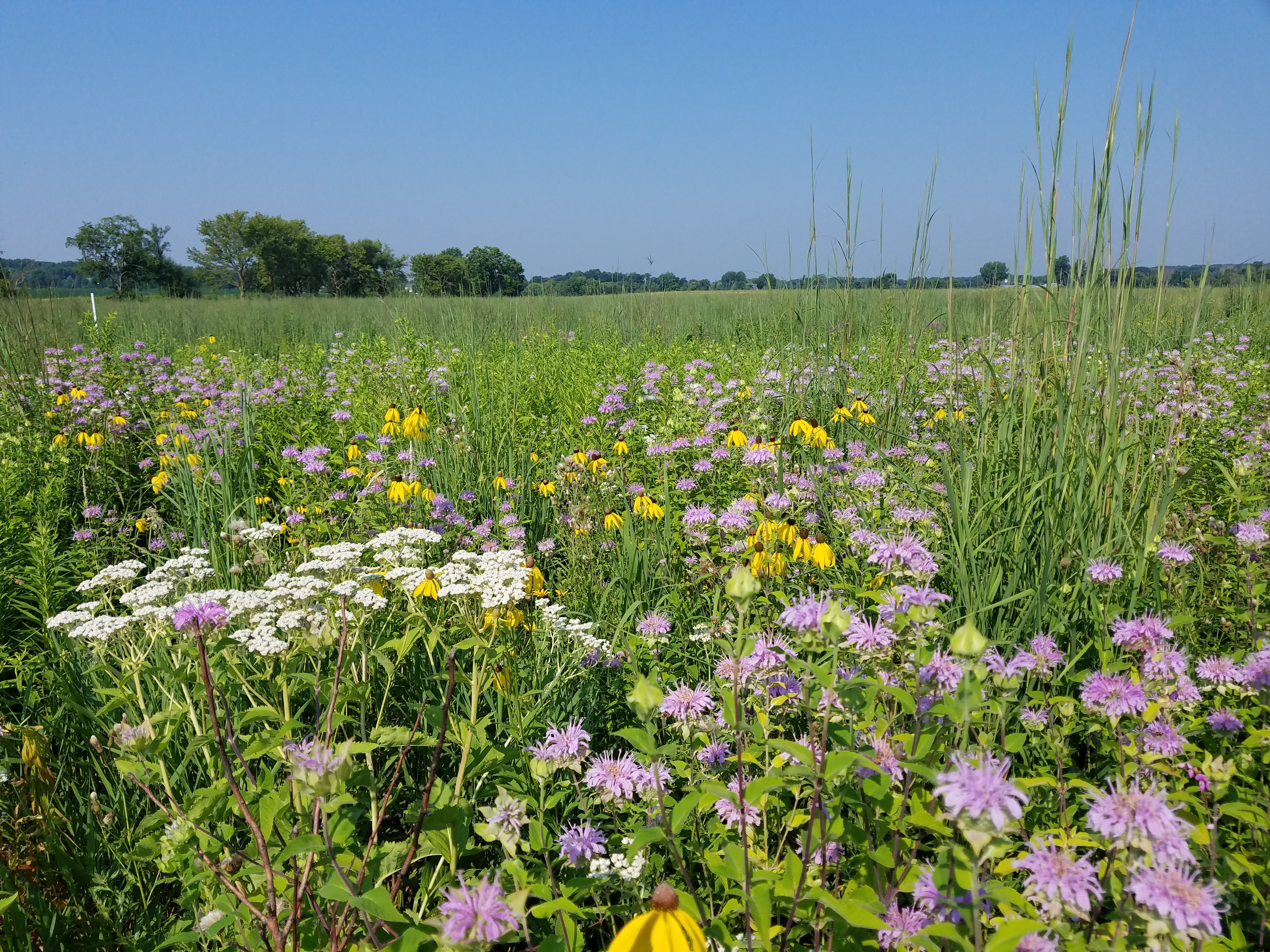
A tallgrass prairie planting in Illinois

Prairie restoration is a conservation effort to restore prairie lands that were destroyed due to industrial, agricultural, commercial, or residential development. The primary aim is to return areas and ecosystems to their previous state before their depletion.

In the United States, after the Black Hawk War had subsided in the mid-1830s, settlers from northern Europe and north east of the US made a home for themselves. They plowed up the tallgrasses and wild flowers in the area. By 1849 most species of prairie grass had disappeared to make room for crops (i.e.: soybeans, corn, etc.). Restored prairies and the grasses that survived the 1800 plowing represent only a fragment of the abundant verdure that once covered the midsection of North America from western Ohio to the Rockies and from southern Canada to Texas. As an example, the U.S. state of Illinois alone once held over 35,000 square miles (91,000 km^{2}) of prairie land and now just 3 square miles (7.8 km^{2}) of that original prairie land is left. The over farming of this land as well as periods of drought and its exposure to the elements (no longer bound together by the tall grasses) was responsible for the Dust Bowls in the 1930s.

Issues of erosion, and waning biodiversity have arisen in areas once populated by prairie grass species. So in efforts of restoration, in Europe, when restoring previous crop land with prairie grasses, the most frequently used techniques involve: spontaneous succession, sowing seed mixtures, transfer of plant material, topsoil removal and transfer. When maintaining these tall grasses, prescribed fire is a popular method. It encourages taller and stronger regrowth as well as the recycling of nutrients in the soil.

Although not fully able to restore the full diversity of an area, restoration efforts aid the thriving of the natural ecosystems. This is further improved by the specific reintroduction of key organisms from the native plants microbiome. Prairie soil also effectively stores carbon. As carbon sinks, they work as a vital regulator of carbon in the atmosphere through carbon sequestration (withdrawal), and the carbon benefits the sustenance of diverse species in the prairie ecosystem.

== Purpose ==
=== Erosion ===
Erosion occurs when surface pressures wear away the material of the Earth's crust. Particularly with land previously dominated by prairie grasses, the loss of the tallgrass extensive fibrous root system left the soil exposed and unbound. Ecologically, prairie restoration aids in conservation of earth's topsoil, which is often exposed to erosion from wind and rain (worsened by climate change's heavier and frequent rain) when prairies are plowed under to make way for new commerce. Conversely, much more of the prairie lands have become the fertile fields on which cereal crops of corn, barley and wheat are grown. Continued erosion reduces the long term productivity of the soil.

Prairie restoration reintroduces this root system that once again binds the soil, strengthening it against water erosion through adequate water filtration.

=== Carbon collection ===
Prairie soil is also useful for carbon sequestration. Carbon dioxide is a heat trapping gas, and 40% of it is produced by humans and remains in the atmosphere thus worsening the effects of global warming. Prairie grass collects this carbon from the atmosphere through photosynthesis and stores it in its soil. When left undisturbed, the prairie soil acts as a Carbon sink, meaning it absorbs more carbon from the atmosphere than it releases.

=== Other purposes ===
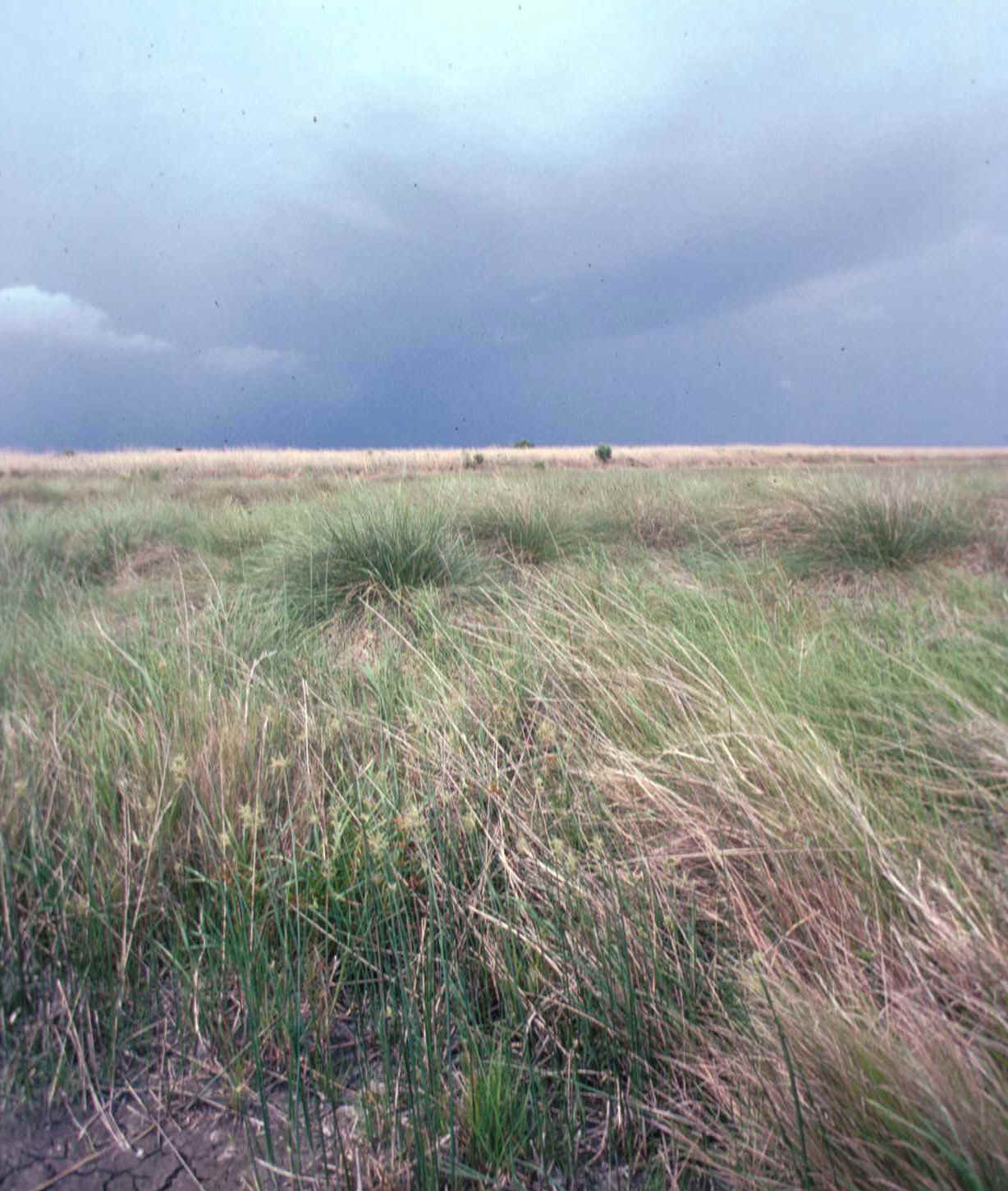
A Coastal prairie restoration project in Texas

Many prairie plants are also highly resistant to drought, temperature extremes, disease, and native insect pests. They are frequently used for xeriscaping projects in arid regions of the American West. On a larger scale, communities and corporations are creating areas of restored prairies which in turn will store organic carbon in the soil and help maintain the biodiversity of the 3000 plus species that count on the grasslands for food and shelter. Research in Walnut Creek Restoration (Iowa) on the contribution of recently converted land (from row crop to prairie grass), shows the improvement in ground water quality over the span of 10 years. By changing the type of plant and quality, the issue of groundwater contamination (of unwanted chemicals, as a result of climate change and an issue of water security) can be alleviated.

==== Micro-prairies ====
A restoration project of prairie lands can on a large or small scale level. Backyard prairie restoration can enrich soil, combat erosion, and absorb water in excessive rainfalls. An example of a backyard prairie restoration is known as a micro-prairie. Micro-prairies are mini prairie habitats that typically consist of less than one acre, usually isolated and surrounded by developed or urban land. These small-scale prairie habitats, offer various benefits, particularly in developed or urban areas where natural prairies may have been lost or fragmented. This miniature ecosystem can provide habitat for a diversity of native plant and animal species specifically adapted to prairie environments, thus helping to sustain local biodiversity. Prairie flowers are attractive to native butterflies and other pollinators. These pollinators have evolved to rely on specific types of plants for their nectar and pollen needs. Micro-prairies can attract native pollinators in several ways. First, they can provide a diverse array of native plants that are adapted to the local environment as a food sources for native pollinators. By including a variety of native plants in a micro-prairie restoration projects, it is possible to create an attractive and beneficial habitat for these insects. Second, micro-prairies can offer specific nesting sites for native pollinators. Many species of bees and other pollinators require specific types of nesting sites, such as hollow plant stems or burrows. Features such as bee boxes or native grasses provide suitable nesting sites for breeding and survival. Finally, micro-prairies can serve as refuge from habitat loss and pesticide use. Pollinators are highly susceptible to these threats, and by restoring small-scale prairie habitats in developed or urban areas, it is possible to create secure environments for critical insects.

Additionally, micro-prairie plants contribute to carbon sequestration, which can improve water quality by absorbing and filtering pollutants, and transforming soil compositions. The ability to carbon sequester is due to the deep root system of prairie grasses that can store large amounts of carbon in the soil. Prairie grasses also have a high rate of biomass production, that can capture and store carbon at a fast rate. Research has shown that prairie plants are also adapted to nutrient-poor soils, promote nutrient cycling, and contribute to soil organic matter which are essential for maintaining soil fertility and structure. Prairie plants leaves have a large surface area that can trap airborne pollutants such as dust, pollen, and particulate matter. The diverse community of microorganisms in prairie soils can break down and metabolize pollutants into less harmful ones. Prairie plants can absorb pollutants such as heavy metals and excess nutrients from water and soil that might enter into an ecosystem.

In general micro-prairies have been found to have a positive impact on local ecosystems and biodiversity. However, some studies have identified potential negative effects of micro-prairies under certain circumstances. For example, studies show that when non-native plant species are introduced into a micro-prairie, they can outcompete native plants and reduce biodiversity. Secondly, if not properly maintained, backyard prairies can overgrow and create a fire risk. Implementing a safe and regular mowing or burning schedule is a recommended management practice to avoid fire risk and excessive plant growth. Lastly, standing water in a micro prairie can provide a breeding habitat for mosquitoes. Proper design and maintenance of micro-prairies can prevent stagnant water from accumulating and attracting mosquitoes.

In urban areas, permaculture is well-suited for reconstructing micro-prairies due to the complementary approach to system design and management. Permaculture is a form of ecological engineering inspired by natural ecosystems which utilize sustainable architecture and horticulture. Utilizing permaculture principles allows for the possibility to create sustainable micro-prairie systems that benefit both the environment and society in urban contexts. For example, the permaculture system emphasizes diversity in plant and animal species, that sustain a healthy ecosystem. Through observing and learning from natural ecosystems, permaculture practitioners apply designs that mimic natural patterns. Companion planting is another principle in permaculture, where different plants are grown together to benefit each other. Furthermore, micro-prairies serve as valuable tool for education and outreach. Micro-prairies allow people to learn about prairie ecosystems and the importance of preserving and restoring native habitats responsibly.

== Types of plants ==
Some prominent tallgrass prairie grasses include big bluestem, indiangrass, and switchgrass. Midgrass and shortgrass species include little bluestem, side oats grama, and buffalograss. Many of the diverse prairie forbs (herbaceous, non-graminoid flowering plants) are structurally specialized to resist herbaceous grazers such as American bison. Some have hairy leaves that may help deter the cold and prevent excessive evaporation. Many of forbs contain secondary compounds that were discovered by indigenous peoples and are still used widely today.

Early prairie restoration efforts tended to focus largely on a few dominant species, typically grasses, with little attention to seed source. With experience, later restorers have realized the importance of obtaining a broad mix of species and using local ecotype seed.

== Planting and aftercare of prairie plants ==
In Europe, when restoring previous crop land with prairie grasses, the most frequently used techniques involve: spontaneous succession, sowing seed mixtures, transfer of plant material, topsoil removal and transfer. Spontaneous succession is an effective technique when quick results are not expected and where there is high availability of propagules. Sowing mixtures can be low or high diversity, referring to the variety of seeds. Low diversity mixtures are great for restoring large areas in a short amount of time. High diversity mixtures (because of their cost and success rate) are used for smaller areas. A mixture of large low diversity areas and small high diversity areas are good rich source patches for the spontaneous colonization of neighboring areas. This allows for the possibility of continued natural restoration.

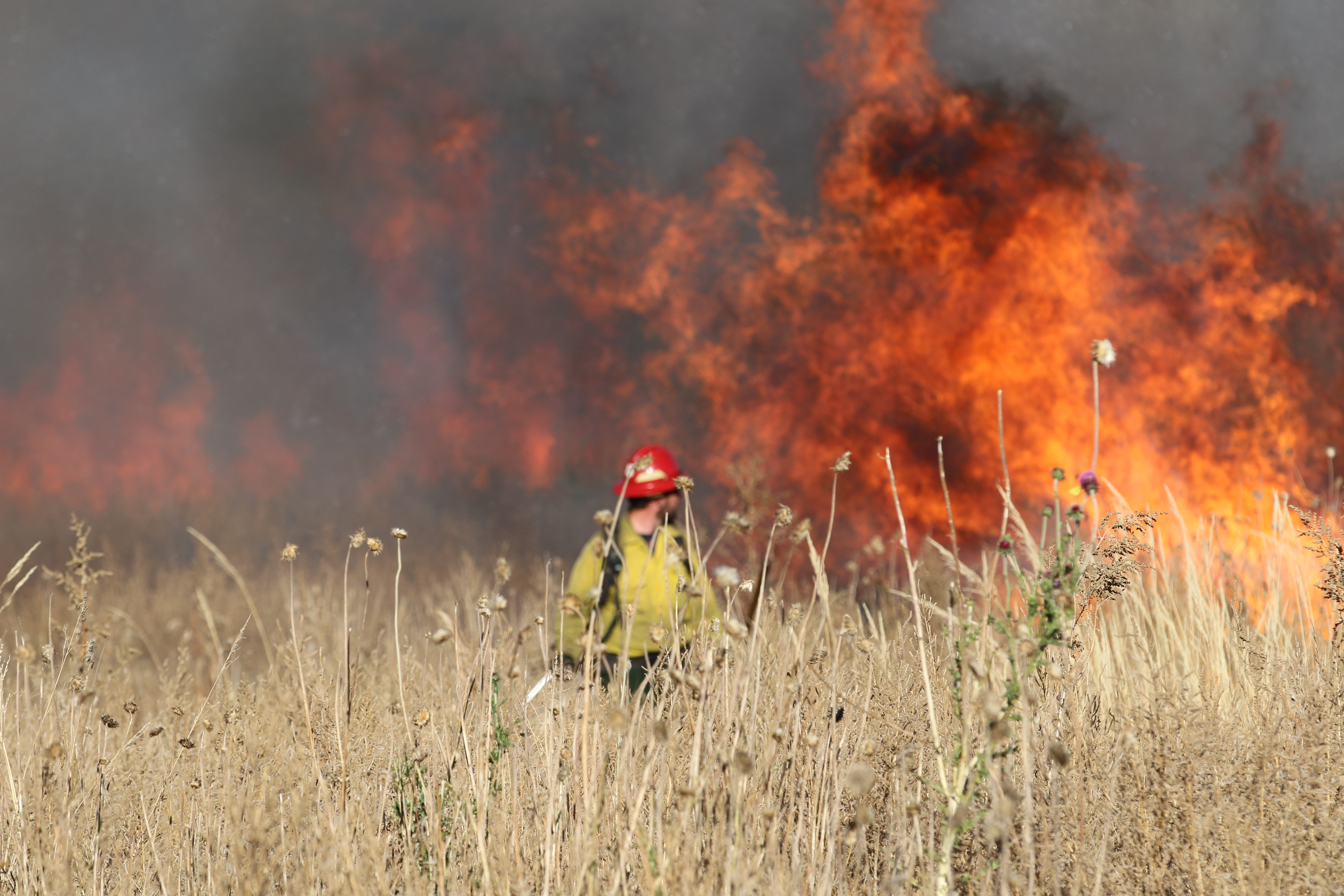
Interagency Fire Crews conduct a prescribed burn on the RMA to reduce weeds, and hazardous fuels, 2014.

Fire is a big component to the success of grasslands, large or small as it is a fire dependent ecosystem. Controlled burns, with a permit, are recommended every 4–8 years (after two growth seasons) to burn away dead plants; prevent certain other plants from encroaching (such as trees) and release and recycling nutrients into the ground to encourage new growth. A much more wildlife habitat friendly alternative to burning every 4–8 years is to burn 1/4 to 1/8 of a tract every year. This will leave wildlife a home every year and still accomplish the task of burning. The Native Americans may also have used the burns to control pests such as ticks. These prescribed burn motivate grasses to grow taller, produce more seed, and flower more abundantly. If controlled burns are not possible, rotational mowing is recommended as a substitute.

One of the newer methods available is holistic management, which uses livestock as a substitute for the keystone species such as bison. Some sites have bison which supports the conservation of the species. This allows the rotational mowing to be done by animals which in turn mimics nature more closely. Holistic management also can use fire as a tool, but in a more limited way and in combination with the mowing done by animals. In parts of Central Asia, grazing is a human factor that greatly affects the progression of grasses.

In 1990, in South Africa, de Lange and Boucher reported the use of smoke to promote seed germination among prairie grasses. It was shown to help break dormancy of certain seeds. Since then this technique has been promoted throughout South Africa, parts of Australia and North America.

== Prairie contributors ==
Some popular prairie restoration projects have been completed and maintained by conservation departments, such as Midewin National Tallgrass Prairie, located in Wilmington, Illinois. This restoration project is administered by the U.S. Department of Agriculture, Forest Service and the Illinois Department of Natural Resources. It sits on part of the Joliet Army Ammunition Plant, specifically on an area once contaminated from TNT manufacturing. Since 1997, the project has opened some 15,000 acres (61 km^{2}) of restored prairie to the public.

Another large restoration project finds its home on the ample area of Fermilab; a U.S. governmental atomic accelerator laboratory located in Batavia, Illinois. Fermilab's 6,800 acres (28 km^{2}) sit a top fertile farmland and the prairie restoration project consists of approximately 1,000 acres (4.0 km^{2}) of that. This project began in 1975 and continues today with the help of Fermilab employees and many community teachers, botanists and volunteers.

== See also ==
- Buffalo Commons
- Holistic management
- Land rehabilitation
- List of protected grasslands of North America
- Restoration ecology
