= Louis De Jaeger =

Belgian entrepreneur, garden and landscape designer, author, filmmaker (born 1994)

- Born: 12 January 1994 (age 32); Bruges
- Website: louisdj.com

Louis De Jaeger (born 12 January 1994) is a Belgian entrepreneur, garden and landscape designer, author and award-winning filmmaker from Bruges. Together with Dirk Draulans, Steven Vromman and Mies Meulders, he founded the ByeByeGrass-campaign with which he calls upon citizens as well as the government to replace as many lawns as possible by a more sustainable alternative. He also co-founded the Food Forest Institute which researches the feasibility of food forest production.

He became well known in Belgium by sending a letter to King Philip asking him to transform his royal lawns into flower meadows and by making a plea in the Flemish Parliament. Worldwide, he designs food forests, gardens and sustainable agricultural projects with his company Commensalist.

== Food forests ==
De Jaeger co-founded the Food Forest Institute together with Ben Brumagne. Food Forest Institute is Belgian organisation that researches the feasibility of food forest production in agriculture and wants to promote this form of land use. He also called for making Brussels an edible capital. With the Food Forest Podcast, he introduces well-known food foresters to the general public. He was appointed by the Department of Agriculture and Fisheries to develop a food forest strategy for Flanders.

== The Biggest Tree Plant ==
Together with Belgian social entrepreneurs he founded The Biggest Tree Plant. With this campaign they call on citizens to plant as many trees as possible in their own gardens. They also held the largest food forest crowdfunding campaign in the world in which more than one hundred landowners participated, with a total of one hundred hectares of potential new food forest to be added.

== Author ==
Since 2018, Louis De Jaeger has written more than 50 opinion pieces for De Standaard, De Morgen, Knack, Knack Weekend and MO* magazine. He made his debut with his book: We eten ons dood: How we can save the world with our agriculture, published by Houtekiet. The book spent several weeks in the top 10 in science. He wrote a book on food forest design.. In 2025, his book: SOS: Save Our Soils was released, with a foreword by Allan Savory.

== Filmmaker ==
Louis De Jaeger made an award-winning documentary about food forests: FoodForest (2022) in which he travels around Belgium with his foldable bike in search of the stories of Belgian food forest pioneers. He collaborated with award-winning Dutch filmmaker Daan Jongbloed. The film was selected for film festivals in Canada, Italy, Brazil, India and Australia, among others. De Jaeger also composed the soundtrack for this film.. He recently co-written and starred in Eat More Trees.

== Night train ==
Together with Louis Lammertyn, Louis De Jaeger founded Belgium's first privatized night train company in 2020: Moonlight Express. The company later merged with European Sleeper, which was founded by Dutch entrepreneurs Elmer van Buuren and Chris Engelsman.
