= Lakland =

American musical instrument manufacturer

Lakland Guitars, LLC
- Type: Private
- Industry: Musical instruments
- Founded: 1994
- Founder: Dan Lakin; Hugh McFarland
- Headquarters: Chicago, Illinois, United States
- Area served: Global
- Key people: John Pirruccello, President
- Products: Solid and hollowbody electric bass guitars.
- Parent: Hanson Musical Instruments, Ltd.
- Website: www.lakland.com

Lakland Guitars is an American manufacturer of electric bass guitars based in Chicago, Illinois. The company's first bass combined elements of the Fender Jazz Bass and the Music Man StingRay. The company's current line-up includes basses inspired by classics like the Fender Precision Bass and Jazz Bass as well as Lakland's own original designs. Lakland's line of signature models includes basses designed in collaboration with well-known bassists Joe Osborn, Donald "Duck" Dunn, Jerry Scheff, Darryl Jones and Bob Glaub. Lakland basses are manufactured in the United States, Japan, South Korea, and Indonesia.

== History ==
Founded by bassist Dan Lakin and luthier Hugh McFarland in 1994, the company's name, pronounced "lake-land", is a portmanteau of "Lakin" and "McFarland", the surnames of its founders.

Lakin and McFarland began developing the first Lakland prototype in January 1994 and showed it later that year at the July 1994 NAMM Show.

The pair launched Lakland in 1994 with a $20,000 home equity loan and Lakland basses went into production in the United States in 1995. In 1996, the company became a unit of A. Lakin & Sons, Inc., a tire recycling company founded by Lakin's grandfather Abraham Lakin in 1919.

McFarland left Lakland in 1997. In 2001, Lakland introduced the Skyline Series, a lower-priced alternative to its U.S.-made basses. Manufactured in South Korea, the Skyline Series helped the company break even for the first time in 2003. Production of Skyline Series basses was moved to Indonesia in 2008.

In April 2010 the company was acquired by Chicago-based Hanson Musical Instruments. Hanson, a maker of electric guitars and electric guitar and bass pickups and electronics, had been Lakland's primary supplier of bass pickups and preamp products since 2005. Lakland was renamed Lakland Guitars LLC and while the Lakland brand name remains, signature model names—such as the Bob Glaub, Duck Dunn and Joe Osborn basses—were given numeric designations. Lakland executive John Pirruccello was named president.

Owners of Lakland basses and others interested in the Lakland company and its products formed The Lakland Owners Group. It is not affiliated with Lakland Guitars, LLC.

== Prototype ==
Lakin and McFarland began designing the first prototype in 1994. Made of ash and a quilted maple top, rock maple neck, and maple fingerboard, the prototype was a blend of elements from a Fender Jazz Bass and an early MusicMan Stingray. Its similarity to Fender's Jazz Bass drew a cease-and-desist order from Fender for trademark infringement.

The prototype's electronics were inspired by a Bass Player magazine review of the Warwick Dolphin bass. Pickups were supplied by Bartolini and the bass featured Lakland's characteristic oval bridge plate. Originally made of aluminum, McFarland later replaced the bridge with one fashioned from chrome-plated steel.

== Instruments ==
Lakland currently manufactures a U.S.-made line of basses called the "U.S. Series", and a lower-priced Indonesian-made line called the "Skyline Series".

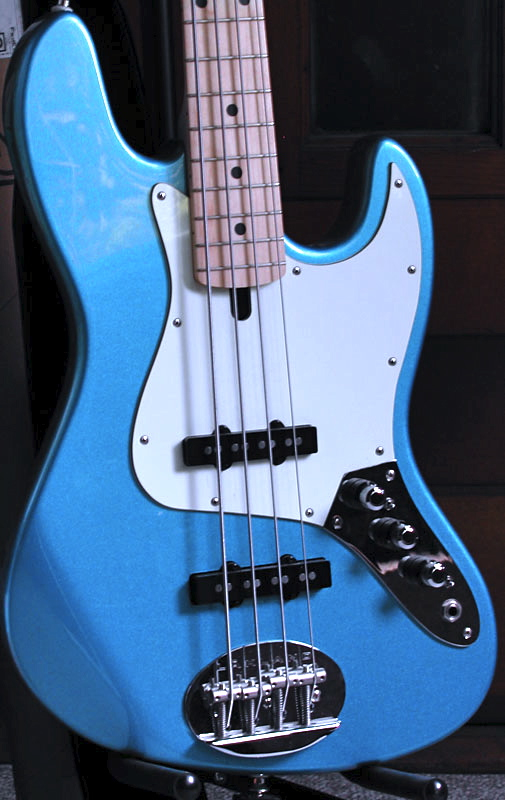
Lakland Joe Osborn signature bass

=== Signature Basses ===
Lakin conceived of a signature model bass in 1997. A bass player himself and a fan of bassist Joe Osborn, Lakin contacted Osborn after reading an article about him in Bass Player magazine. Osborn, known for his 1960 Fender Jazz Bass, collaborated with Lakin and a team that included luthier Michael Tobias on what would become a vintage Jazz bass-style 4-string bass known originally as the Joe Osborn Signature model and equipped with Lindy Fralin pickups.

Other signature models were developed in collaboration with bassists Geezer Butler, Jerry Scheff, Donald "Duck" Dunn, Darryl Jones and Bob Glaub.

The Donald "Duck" Dunn and Bob Glaub signature models remain in production under the names 44-64 Custom, and 44-64/55-64, respectively.

=== Hollowbody ===
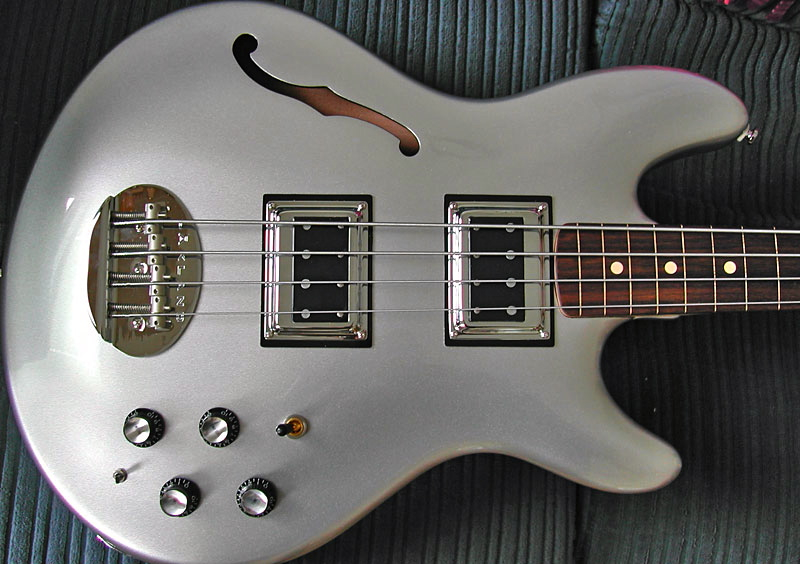
Original Lakland Hollowbody design customized with Dark Star pickups

The Lakland Hollowbody is a dual-pickup, hollow-body electric bass guitar designed in conjunction with luthier Michael Tobias. The bass is constructed of carved mahogany for the back and sides and of maple for the top and neck. The fingerboard is made of rosewood. Current models are equipped with two of Lakland's Chi-Sonic pickups. The body of the bass is completely hollow with no supporting center block.

=== Decade ===
The Lakland Decade is a dual-pickup, solid-body electric bass guitar released in 2004 to celebrate the company's 10th anniversary. The U.S. Series Decade is available in a variety of configurations. The Skyline series is constructed of a mahogany body, maple neck, and rosewood fingerboard and equipped with Lakland's Chi-Sonic pickups.

=== U.S. Series ===
Lakland U.S. Series basses are manufactured by Lakland in the United States.

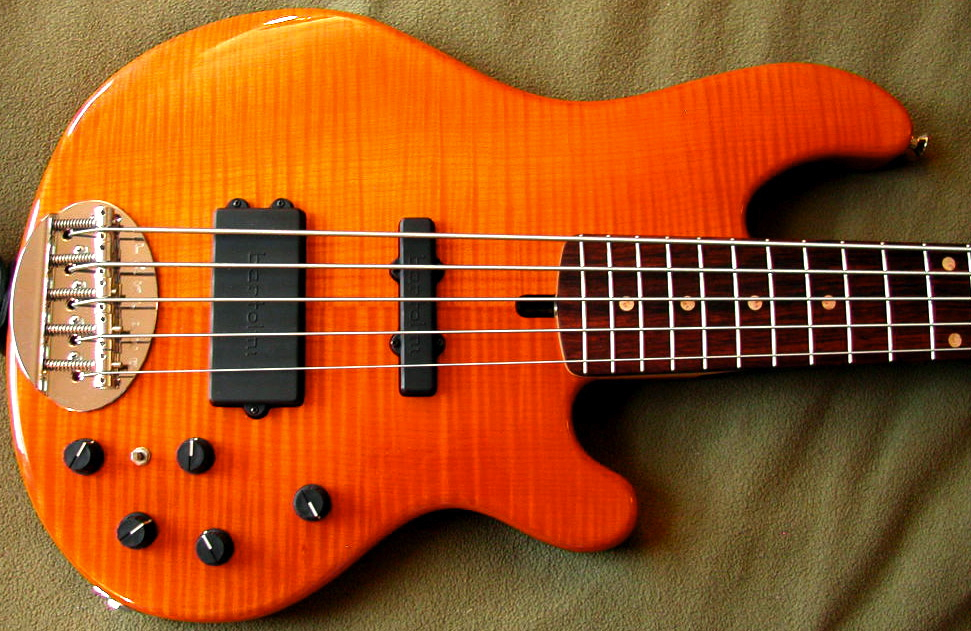
Lakland 55-94

Current U.S. Series models include:

- 44-94: Lakland's first bass
- 55-94: Lakland's first 5-string bass, featuring a 35-inch scale neck
- Decade: a dual-pickup bass created to celebrate the company's 10th anniversary
- 44-60/55-60: the first Lakland signature model, a vintage Jazz bass-style bass formerly known as the Joe Osborn Signature and available in 4- and 5-string models
- 44-64/55-64: a vintage Precision-style bass formerly known as the Bob Glaub Signature and available in 4- and 5-string models
- 44-64 Custom: a 4-string bass combining a Precision-style body and a Jazz-style neck, formerly known as the Duck Dunn Signature
- 44-51/44-51M: 4 string basses (with rosewood/maple alternative fingerboards) inspired by the first Fender Precision Bass which debuted in 1951
- 44-AJ/55-AJ: an active Jazz-style bass available in 4- and 5-string models
- Hollowbody: a dual-pickup, hollow-body bass designed in conjunction with luthier Michael Tobias
- 55-69 Tetsuya: a pink-finished 5-string bass designed in collaboration with L'Arc-en-Ciel bassist Tetsuya and Japanese electric guitar and bass manufacturer ESP

=== Skyline Series ===
Lakland introduced its lower-priced Skyline Series of basses in 2001.

Originally manufactured in South Korea, Skyline Series basses are currently built in Indonesia and Korea. The first two digits of the serial number on a Skyline Series-bass indicates the year it was built. Skyline Series basses are shipped to Lakland's U.S. facility for the installation of electronics and final inspection and set-up.

In 2001, Lakland introduced the Korean (Indonesian since 2008) made Skyline Series. Developed with the help of importer-exporter Westheimer Corp., the midrange Skyline Series is constructed using North American wood and features the same overall design as the US basses (excluding the graphite reinforcement on the 4-string necks, all necks being half-sawn instead of quarter-sawn, acrylic nuts instead of bone, no left-hand models, no alder body wood option, and in far fewer colors) but is cut, finished, and assembled overseas. Once the instrument arrives in Chicago, the company's builders work to install its electronics and make sure the frets are leveled within specification of Lakland's US models. Lakland currently uses the PLEK setup and leveling system. The Skyline 44-02 and 55-02 models originally contained the USA Bartolini MM\J pickups and NTMB preamp, the same system that was in the USA 44-94 and 55-94 basses. Currently all of those models (44-94, 55–94, 44–02, 55–02) contain the Lakland-Hanson LH3 system. The Skyline 44-01 and 55-01 models contain the Korean Bartolini MK1 pickups and preamp. The Osborn, Scheff, and Jones signature models previously featured Hipshot-licensed tuners and Lakland-Hanson custom pickups. (Previously Lakland used Aero or Lindy Fralin pickups.)

== Shoreline Series/Skyline Japan series ==
The Lakland Shoreline Series is manufactured in Japan to Lakland USA specs by the Japanese guitar company ESP, and is available for sale exclusively in Japan.

ESP also manufactures the Skyline Japan Series, much the same way as they produce their own Edwards range. These are manufactured in China to be a lower cost option to the MIJ Shoreline line-up. Most Skyline Japan series basses, such as the Skyline 44-AJ, feature Duncan Design pickups and the Bartolini ME-1 pre amp.
