= Holistic Management International =

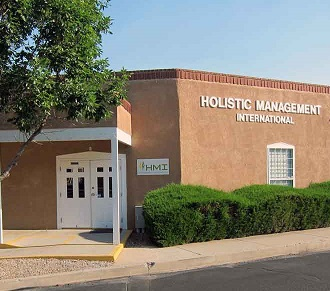
- HMI offices Albuquerque, New Mexico
- Abbreviation: (HMI)
- Formation: 1984
- Type: Non-profit INGO
- Purpose: Promotion of and education in holistic management.
- Website: www.holisticmanagement.org
- Formerly called: Center for Holistic Management; The Savory Center

Holistic Management International (HMI) is a not-for-profit organization promoting holistic management in agriculture, based in Albuquerque, New Mexico. It maintains an international network of educators and "land stewards" who "use holistic management strategies to manage more than 30 million acres around the globe". HMI's mission is to envision and realize healthy, resilient lands and thriving communities by serving people in the practice of Holistic Decision Making & Management.

== About ==
Holistic Management International was founded in 1984 by Allan Savory and Jody Butterfield to promote the practice of holistic management on a global level. It was originally called the Center for Holistic Management and later Holistic Management International.

HMI has the goal of educating people in ways to manage natural resources in such a way as to build biodiversity, improve natural growth production, enhance land and financial sustainability, and improve the overall land quality for those who use it.

In 1992 it launched the Africa Centre for Holistic Management, based in Zimbabwe. This became a regional office of HMI, but separated in 2010.

Savory left HMI in 2009 to form the for-profit Savory Institute.

In February 2010, PBS broadcast a documentary called First Millimeter: Healing The Earth detailing the work HMI was doing around the world.

== Programs ==
=== Education and educator training ===
HMI offers introductory and advanced courses in holistic management practices and an Individualized Certified Educator Training Program.

In October 2011 HMI ran a series of seminars as part of their 'Beginning Farmers and Ranchers' programs in Texas. They were designed to teach women resource management skills.

=== Whole Farm/Ranch Planning ===
Beginning farmers in the Northeast learned more about whole farm/ranch planning in a program developed specifically for women and funded by a USDA grant. This program was expanded to include 6 Northeast states and Texas

=== Publications ===
HMI publishes an online journal called In Practice.

== Awards and grants ==
In 2005 HMI was awarded a substantial grant from U.S. Agency for International Development (USAID) for work in Africa.

In 2008 HMI was awarded $329,750 from USAID's Office of Foreign Disaster Assistance to address drought disaster issues in Zimbabwe.

In 2009 HMI was awarded $639,301 for their beginning farmers program.

In 2011 Farm Aid awarded a grant to HMI for $5000 in support of their Beginning Farmers and Ranchers program in Texas. In 2012 $7,500 to help new farmers incorporate environmental, economic and social sustainability through the Whole Farm Planning curriculum.

In 2012 HMI was awarded a $537,101 federal grant from USDA to train first-time women farmers in whole farm planning.

In 2013 HMI was awarded a $60,400 federal grant from USDA Western SARE to train agricultural professionals in Holistic Management® Whole Farm/Ranch Planning.

In 2023 HMI was awarded $50,000 grant for Regenerating Agriculture in NM.

Continuous grant support from #NoRegrets -

== See also ==
- Resource management
- Sustainable agriculture
- Systems ecology
- Sustainability
