= André Voisin =

French biochemist, farmer and author (1903–1964)

- Born: André Marcel Voisin; 7 January 1903; Dieppe, France
- Died: 21 December 1964 (aged 61); Havana, Cuba
- Occupations: Biochemist, farmer, author
- Known for: Rational Grazing
- Notable work: Grass Productivity (1957); Soil, Grass & Cancer (1959)
- Spouse: Martha Rosine Voisin (m. 1943)

André Marcel Voisin (7 January 1903 – 21 December 1964) was a French biochemist, farmer and author best known for developing the theory of Rational Grazing (also known as Voisinism, Voisin Grazing or Rational Intensive Grazing). He also lectured extensively on his theories in many parts of the world. His books have been translated into 18 languages and reprinted many times.

== Early life ==
Voisin was born on 7 January 1903 in Dieppe, a coastal community in the Upper Normandy region of France. His parents were Albert Voisin and Marie Antoinette Morthe Legendre, well known farmers and landholders. He undertook his primary and secondary studies in Dieppe at the Jehan Ango school, beginning in 1910, and subsequently at the Lycée Louis-le-Grand in Paris.

He undertook his military service with the French navy in 1923, graduating as a lieutenant.

In 1924 he graduated with a diploma of biochemistry from the School of Physics and Chemistry, école supérieure de physique et de chimie industrielles de la ville de Paris. Following his graduation from the School of Physics and Chemistry, Voisin worked as an engineer in the rubber industry, initially in a tyre factory. He subsequently took on a senior engineering role in the firm SIT, and developed a method for improving the efficiency of production techniques.

In 1936 he attended the University of Heidelberg in order to improve his ability with the German language. He received his diploma for a thesis entitled "Goethe and France", and was named an Honorary Citizen of the city of Heidelberg.

Voisin married Marthe-Rosine Fernagu in occupied Paris during 1943.

== Military career ==
At the outbreak of war in September 1939, Voisin quit his position in the rubber industry to join the war effort. He was initially stationed with the French Navy in Algeria. He was involved in two naval missions in the Mediterranean during 1939, being seriously injured in the second. After initial treatment in Algiers, he spent four months in the Val-de-Grâce hospital in Paris.

In 1940 he undertook several ground engagements in France, and was also involved in the Narvik Campaign. Prior to the Fall of France, Voisin was ordered to evacuate to England. He and a small contingent of men crossed the English Channel from Cherbourg-en-Cotentin in a daring boat journey lasting several days. Once in England, Voisin met with Admiral Thierry d'Argenlieu and was made Secretary Attaché to Admiral Émile Muselier, leader of the Free French Naval Forces.

In October 1940, Voisin returned to occupied France to administer his family farm, "Le Talou", a 130-hectare (320-acre) estate in Gruchet, south of Arques-la-Bataille. From 1941 to 1944 he assisted the Resistance by secretly arranging deliveries of food produced on the farm. He also acted as a translator for the mayor, Albert Thoumyer, in dealings with the Nazi occupiers. In March 1943, he advocated successfully to save a farmer from the firing squad.

After the liberation of Paris in August 1944, Voisin left Le Talou in the care of his wife and travelled to Paris to meet with Admiral d'Argenlieu. Lieutenant Voisin was assigned a regiment of marine infantry and was then involved in several campaigns with the Free French forces, notably the short-lived but intense Battle of the Vosges in October. He was injured again in Benfeld.

In 1946 Voisin published his memoirs of the war, based on his war diaries, under the title A Single Foot on the Earth. It was illustrated by the official Navy artist, Commander Luc-Marie Bayle

== Return to farming ==
Towards the end of 1945, having fulfilled his duty to his country, Voisin returned to Gruchet to pursue his true passion of farming.

Voisin would derive great pleasure simply from observing his cattle graze the sward. He noticed differences between the action of a grazing cow versus mowing and feeding hay. Whereas a sward mown for hay is all cut at essentially the same time, a grazed pasture is only cut as fast as the herd is able to eat it. Likewise while a feedlot cow may eat as much as she wants without moving, a pastured cow must both walk to a desirable part of the pasture, and then shear the grass with her teeth one mouthful at a time.

Over time he came to the realisation that existing theories of grazing did not accurately describe the conditions of a grazing animal. In an attempt to follow the scientific method, researchers would focus on the growing of grass (without grazing animals), or the feeding of cut grass to animals in feedlots, but very rarely the behaviour of cattle grazing on pasture. Voisin realised that this relationship – which he called "the meeting of cow and grass" – was fundamentally different to either action performed in isolation.

These realities led Voisin to the realisation that time is critical. It is not the number of animals per acre, but the time which plants are exposed to animals which is the chief determinant of overgrazing. If animals are permitted to remain on the pasture too long, a palatable plant will be grazed a second time before it has had time to recover from the first. Also, repeated grazing at short intervals does not allow the plant to achieve its maximum growth rate, thus limiting the amount of sunlight energy captured and converted to useful feed by the plant.

The work Voisin was conducting on his farm began to attract scientific attention. From 1951, Voisin was invited to give lectures both at home and abroad, most notably in the United States in 1951, but also in Great Britain, Ireland and Germany. In 1956, he was appointed an associate professor at the National Veterinary School of Alfort, and a member of the Academy of Agriculture of France.

In 1954, Voisin recorded an effective stocking rate for the most productive part of the grazing season (10 May – 23 September) of 2.2 Livestock Units per acre (5.5 LU/ha). Prior to starting rational grazing, Voisin claimed his stocking rate was only 0.6 LU/acre (1.5 LU/ha), representing a more-than tripling of his stocking rate.

=== Four Laws ===
Eventually Voisin developed his "four laws" of rational grazing; he argued that these principles were applicable universally, "whatever the soil conditions, climate, altitude, latitude or longitude."

- First Law: Before a sward, sheared with the animal's teeth, can achieve its maximum productivity, sufficient interval must have elapsed between two successive shearings to allow the grass:
  - to accumulate in its roots the reserves necessary for a vigorous spurt of re-growth;
  - to produce its “blaze of growth” (or high daily yield per acre).
- Second Law: The total occupation period on one paddock should be sufficiently short for a grass sheared on the first day (or at the beginning) of occupation not to be cut again by the teeth of these animals before they leave the paddock.
- Third Law: The animals with the greatest nutritional requirements must be helped to harvest the greatest quantity of grass of the best possible quality.
- Fourth Law: If a cow is to give regular milk yields she must not stay any longer than three days on the same paddock. Yields will be at their maximum if the cow stays on one paddock for only one day.

== Visit to Cuba and death ==
In June 1964, Fidel Castro extended an invitation to Voisin to deliver a series of lectures at the University of Havana in Cuba on the subject of Rational Grazing. Despite the negative perception in Europe of Castro's communist government, Voisin agreed. He and his wife arrived in Cuba on 3 December, and were personally greeted by Castro at Jose Marti Airport. Castro and Voisin, as well as numerous dignitaries, then led an inspection of a nearby farm owned by the Cuban Prime Minister.

The series of lectures opened on 8 December at the University of Havana. In welcoming Voisin, Castro stated "Through all his works, in all his labor, it can be seen that... human health, human happiness, is the main objective of Professor Voisin's work." On 11 December, Voisin was awarded an honorary doctorate from the university.

At 3:50 pm on 21 December, Voisin died suddenly of a heart attack at his hotel. Fidel Castro announced his death on national television that evening. A state funeral was held the following day at the Great Hall of the University of Havana. Voisin had previously expressed to his wife the desire that, should he die whilst abroad giving lectures, his remains should be buried in the country of his death. In accordance with his wishes, Voisin was buried at Colon Cemetery, Havana.

== Legacy ==
Voisin became, and remains, a celebrated figure in Cuba. The Cuban government declared 1965 "The Year of Agriculture" in homage to Voisin, and a commemorative stamp was issued on the first anniversary of his death, having a face value of 3¢. Marthe-Rosine Voisin developed a deep fondness for Cuba, and visited many times until her death in 2012 at age 107. She was buried in Chécy, France, close to Orleans, with her parents, Gabriel and Irmis Fernagu.

Despite Castro's advocacy of his work and its presence in Cuban academia, Voisin's methods were largely ignored by Cuban farmers until forced to adopt less input-intensive methods following the collapse of the Communist Common Market in 1989, which plunged Cuba into a three-year economic crisis which became known as the Special Period. The loss of Soviet energy and chemical imports necessitated the transition to "an organic and skill-intensive agroecological model" based on the principles of Voisinism. The transition was successful; in 1989, Cuban agriculture had been similar to that practiced in California, but by 1992 it was more akin to that practiced in Amish communities. By 1995, the practice of urban agriculture, particularly via the use of organoponicos, was widespread.

In the 1980s and later, Voisin's work received increased attention from English-speaking authors, notably Allan Nation, Joel Salatin and Allan Savory. Savory is perhaps the most vocal advocate of Voisin's methods among western authors. Voisin's principles strongly influenced his development of Holistic management). Savory later wrote an introduction for the 1988 reprint of Grass Productivity.

Although Voisin's research is now considered one of the foundational works of the permaculture, holistic management and grass-fed beef movements, he remains relatively unknown in his home country. According to a socialist compatriot Gérard Pestrinaux, he is a political paradox: "(Voisin) was not a man of the left, but a classic Gaullist right, and yet he is buried in the cemetery of the heroes of the Cuban Revolution!"

== Publications ==
- A Single Foot on the Earth (1946) – war memoirs based on Voisin's diaries. Published in French as Un seul pied sur la terre
- Grass Productivity (1957) – originally published in French as Productivité de l'herbe, English and German translations were released in 1959, while a second edition with minor changes was released in 1961. It is Voisin's most enduring work, with additional republications released in 1988 and 2013.
- The Cow and her Grass (1958) – a practical guide to rational grazing, co-authored with André Lecomte, a member of the Veterinary Academy of France.
- Soil, Grass and Cancer (1959)
- Better Grassland Sward (1960) – originally published in French as Dynamique des herbages, and written as a successor to Grass Productivity.
- Rational Grazing – The Meeting of Cow and Grass: A Manual of Grass Productivity (1962)
- Grass Tetany (1963) – originally published in French as Tetanie d'herbe
- Fertilizer Application: Soil, Plant, Animal (1964)
