= Hanson Musical Instruments =

American guitar manufacturer

Hanson Musical Instruments, LTD is a manufacturer of electric guitars and electronics/pickups for electric guitars and basses. The company is based in Chicago, Illinois, USA, founded in 2005 by John and Bo Pirruccello. The company is the current owner of the Lakland brand of basses.

== Product range ==
The company's product range includes the Chicagoan, a mini-humbucker guitar designed to resemble the Epiphone Riviera and the Gretsch White Falcon, the Cigno, supporting P-90 pickups, and the three-humbucker Firenze.

== Notable users ==
Richie Furay played a Hanson Chicagoan ST during the 2011 Buffalo Springfield reunion tour.
