= Lindy Fralin =

US manufacturer of guitar pickups

Lindy Fralin is a US manufacturer of "boutique" guitar pickups based in Richmond, Virginia. Lindy Fralin started winding pickups in the early 1990s. He started winding by hand on a homemade machine because he was not satisfied with commercially available pickups. After a number of years experimenting with various formulas he found one that improved the tone of standard single coil windings.

Fralin Pickups started as a one-man shop in the Fan District in Richmond, Virginia. Fralin began repairing broken pickups from local music stores.

A number of guitar players heard the resulting product and asked him to do the same for their guitars, which led him to establish Lindy Fralin Pickups. The company still winds pickups by hand to the specifications of each customer. They are also known for period correct rewinding of vintage guitar pickups. The company now employs 12 people and ships pickups worldwide.

Fralin also produced pickups for PRS Guitars initially for the EG II model, then continuing to the Custom 22 model.

In 2022, Lindy Fralin released a newly-redesigned version of the Filter'Tron pickup - called his Fralin'Tron.
