= Allan Savory =

Zimbabwean farmer (born 1935)

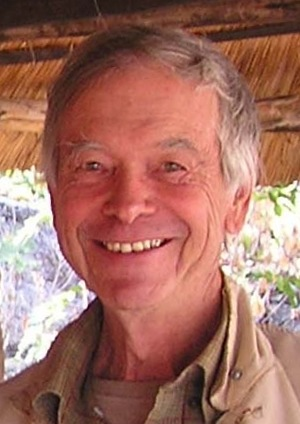
- Born: 15 September 1935 (age 90); Bulawayo, Southern Rhodesia (now Zimbabwe)
- Education: University of Natal
- Known for: Holistic management
- Awards: Banksia International Award (2003); Buckminster Fuller Challenge (2010)
- Scientific career
- Fields: Ecology, resource management
- Workplaces: Savory Institute; Africa Center for Holistic Management

Clifford Allan Redin Savory (born 15 September 1935) is a Zimbabwean ecologist and former soldier, farmer, rancher, and Rhodesian politician. He is the President Emeritus and co-founder of the Savory Institute. He originated holistic management, a systems thinking approach to managing resources, and the origin story his professional life's work is told in the memoir UnSavory: African Stories of Wildlife, War and the Birth of Holistic Management.

Savory advocates that management at all levels, from individual to household or community to governance, should be "holistic," a term coined by J.C. Smuts in his book Holism and Evolution. This central concept of Holistic Management is most practically applied in Savory's planning procedure for land and livestock management (Holistic Planned Grazing), which allows farmers, ranchers, or pastoralists to bunch and move livestock—when contextually appropriate—in an effort to honor the co-evolved relationships between grassland and herbivores, and as a means to restore degraded landscapes.

Savory has stated "only livestock can reverse desertification. There is no other known tool available to humans with which to address desertification that is contributing not only to climate change but also to much of the poverty, emigration, violence, etc. in the seriously affected regions of the world." "Only livestock can save us." He believes grasslands hold the potential to sequester enough atmospheric carbon dioxide to reverse climate change. Praised by cattle farmers, his ideas have sparked opposition from some academics; ranging from debate on evidence for treatment effects to the scope of the potential impact for carbon sequestration.

Savory received the 2003 Banksia International Award and won the 2010 Buckminster Fuller Challenge. Prince Charles called him "a remarkable man" and noted farmer Joel Salatin wrote, "History will vindicate Allan Savory as one of the greatest ecologists of all time."

In contrast, James E. McWilliams described Savory as having "adherence to scientifically questionable conclusions in the face of evidence to the contrary". George Monbiot said of him, "his statements are not supported by empirical evidence and experimental work, and that in crucial respects his techniques do more harm than good." However, this comment has been subject to criticism in a later article published in The Guardian by Hunter Lovins, titled "Why George Monbiot is wrong: grazing livestock can save the world".

== Life ==
=== Education ===
Savory was educated in South Africa at what was then the University of Natal, gaining a B.Sc. in Biology and Botany in 1955.

=== Early work in southern Africa ===
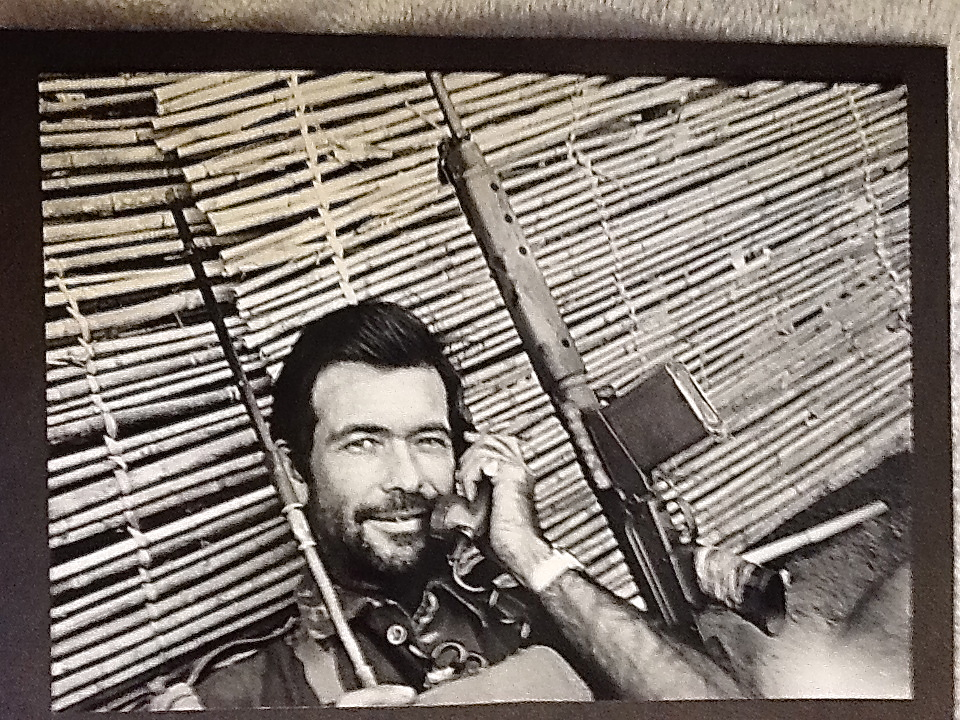
Captain Savory

Savory's early career was multifaceted, working as a biologist, soldier, public servant, member of parliament, president of a political party, farmer, rancher, and as a consultant. The insights from these experiences eventually culminated in what is now known as Holistic Management.

His work studying the root cause of biodiversity loss leading to land degradation (desertification) began as early as 1955 in Northern Rhodesia (now Zambia), where he served in the Colonial Service as Provincial Game Officer for the Northern Province (now four Provinces). His work continued in Southern Rhodesia (now Zimbabwe), first as a research officer in the Game Department and then as an independent scientist and international consultant.

Savory's early research advocated for the culling of large numbers of elephants based on the belief that large numbers of grazing herbivores were destroying their own habitat, a mainstream belief that persists with many anti-livestock proponents to this day. His recommendations were not enacted during his time in the Game Department, but later in 1969 as a Member of Parliament he brought about a Parliamentary Commission of Enquiry led by George Petrides charged "to investigate and report on all aspects of wild life policy and management in Rhodesia and to make recommendations thereon." Following the recommendations of the Petrides Commission, Dr. Graham Child was appointed Director of National Parks and Wild Life Management who then implemented an elephant culling program. In a 2004 article discussing the program, Dr. Child noted that "while I was Director 30,529 [elephants] were killed, mostly on culls, and the countrywide population grew from an estimated 44,109 to 52,583 animals."

However, this culling program did not reverse the degradation of the land as expected, and Savory has called his decision to advocate for the culling of large numbers of elephants "the saddest and greatest blunder of my life." This preventable loss of life, the result of interpreting research data to fit the prevailing world-view that too many animals causes overgrazing and overbrowsing, led to Savory becoming even more determined to understand and resolve the root cause of land degradation and to prevent others from making the same short-sighted mistakes which he attributed to applying reductionist thinking to complex living systems. This eventually led to Savory's development of a holistic framework for decision-making and to the creation of Holistic Planned Grazing, as detailed in his books, Holistic Management, Third Edition: A Commonsense Revolution to Restore Our Environment, written with his wife Jody Butterfield, and Holistic Management Handbook, Third Edition: Regenerating Your Land and Growing Your Profits, written with Sam Bingham and Jody Butterfield.

Savory was influenced by earlier work of French agronomist André Voisin who said that overgrazing resulted from the amount of time plants were exposed to animals, not from too many animals in any given area. Savory saw this as a solution to overgrazing, and believed that overgrazing was caused by leaving cattle too long and returning them too soon, rather than the size of the herd.

=== Military involvement ===
Savory wrote in his memoir that he joined the British Colonial Service in the Northern Rhodesian Game Department in part to develop bushcraft and tracking skills he believed would have military applications in anticipated guerrilla warfare. In the early 1960s, when Savory was a Territorial (reserve) Army officer, he wrote to Federal Prime Minister Roy Welensky recommending the military prepare for impending guerrilla warfare by training trackers - a recommendation which was rejected by conservative senior officers. However, in the early 1960s, his ideas began to gain acceptance when the Federal Army's elite all-white Special Air Service (SAS) invited him to present courses on tracking and "aggressive bush craft" to military personnel.

At the time of Unilateral Declaration of Independence in 1965, Savory was a captain in the part-time Territorial Army unit, the 4th Battalion Royal Rhodesia Regiment. He opposed UDI quietly. In 1965, Savory presented a paper to Rhodesian Army Headquarters suggesting the formation of a Guerrilla Anti-terrorist Unit (GATU) with white SAS operators and black police who would specialize in tracking, and pose as African nationalist insurgents to infiltrate and eliminate their groups - this request was approved, but disagreement between army and police led to the unit's termination. Before GATU was disbanded, Savory recalls that on operations "we whites were blackened with special dye produced for us". In his memoir, Savory described the use of enemy weapons and clothing during pseudo-operations, and wrote that participants sometimes darkened their faces and hands with dye. Subsequently, the army allowed Savory to select members of the entirely white Territorial Army, who were also rangers from the Rhodesian Department of National Parks and Wildlife Management (DNPWLM), and civilian professional hunters to form the Tracker Combat Unit (TCU) - as the unit had no black personnel, plans to infiltrate groups were abandoned, and re-focused on tracking and killing African nationalist insurgents.

Subsequently, the army allowed Savory to select members of the Territorial Army, along with rangers from the Rhodesian Department of National Parks and Wildlife Management (DNPWLM) and civilian professional hunters, to form the Tracker Combat Unit (TCU); as the unit had no black personnel, plans to infiltrate groups were abandoned, and it refocused on tracking insurgent groups.

After Savory's departure from the TCU, it later evolved to become the Selous Scouts.

=== Political involvement ===
Savory was elected to the Rhodesian Parliament representing Matobo constituency in the 1970 election. In 1973, Savory advocated for the expansion of local Counter Insurgency groups during the Rhodesian Bush War, saying that the guerillas "only require the mass of the population to be passive. We, to win, require the mass of the population to be actively in support of us and not passive. We are at a severe disadvantage here", earning ridicule from his own party. After resigning from the Rhodesian Front in protest over its policies and handling of the war, in 1973 Savory reformed the defunct Rhodesia Party formerly led by Sir Roy Welensky. Savory stated in March 1973 that the primary aim of the Rhodesia Party under his presidency was "to ensure the long-term future of the European in Rhodesia through strong and just government" and as part of this white economic superiority must be maintained, but the extreme differences between white and black wages should be lessened so that "good government" would reduce calls for "self-government". The party also stated that it did not want African members, and in March 1973 stated that it "will not be a party to a coalition with African members of Parliament". In May 1973, Savory stated that the Rhodesia Party supported racial segregation including of schools and hospitals, recommending that only Africans who have to work in towns such as domestic servants should be housed in urban areas - and suggested the introduction of a "Minister for Population Control" who would handle the "population explosion" among Africans. In June 1973, Savory publicly stated, "If I had been born a black Rhodesian, instead of a white Rhodesian, I would be your greatest terrorist." Although he urged white Rhodesians to understand why he would feel this, the reaction to this statement led to Savory's ousting from the Rhodesia Party. In 1977, other moderate white parties united in opposition to Ian Smith in what was known as the National Unifying Force (NUF) led by Savory. The NUF party won no seats in the 1977 election, and Savory relinquished leadership to Tim Gibbs, son of Rhodesia's last governor before UDI. Savory continued to fight Ian Smith and his policies, in particular opposing the Internal Settlement under Bishop Abel Muzorewa. In 1979, due to conflicts with the Smith government, Savory left Rhodesia and went into self-imposed exile to continue his scientific work.

=== Move to the Americas ===
After leaving Zimbabwe, Savory worked from the Cayman Islands into the Americas, introducing holistic planned grazing as a process of management to reverse desertification of 'brittle' grasslands by carefully planning movements of dense herds of livestock to mimic those found in nature, allowing sufficient time for the plants to fully recover before re-grazing. Savory immigrated to the US, and with his wife Jody Butterfield founded the Center for Holistic Management in 1984. Its name was later changed to the Savory Center and later Holistic Management International. In 2009 Savory left HMI and formed the Savory Institute. Savory, Butterfield and philanthropist Sam Brown formed the Africa Centre for Holistic Management, based in Zimbabwe in 1992 on 2,520 hectares (6,200 acres) of land Savory donated for the benefit of the people of Africa as a learning/training site for holistic management.

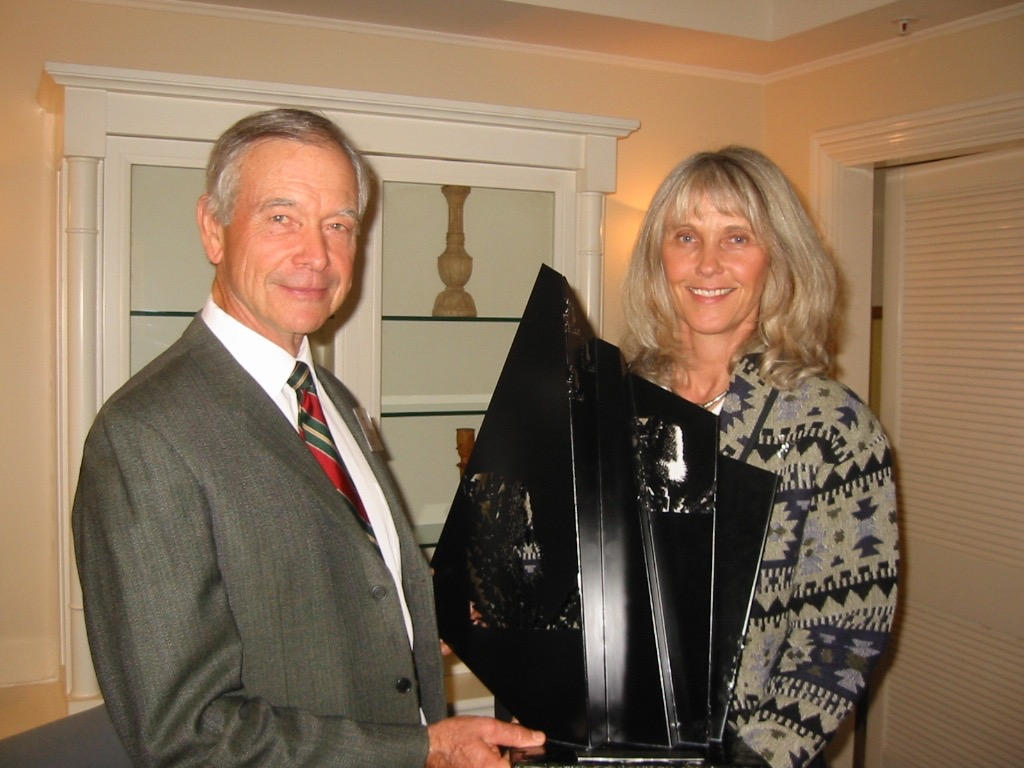
Allan Savory and Jody Butterfield 2003

=== Personal life ===
When not travelling the world spreading his message, Savory and Butterfield split their time between their house in Albuquerque and a thatched-roof complex of mud huts in the African bush in Zimbabwe. He frequently goes barefoot.

== Holistic management advocacy ==
His 2013 TED Talk, "How to green the desert and reverse climate change," attracted millions of views and was followed up by the release of his TED Book, The Grazing Revolution: A Radical Plan to Save the Earth. In his TED Talk Savory asks, "What are we going to do?"

"There is only one option, I'll repeat to you, only one option left to climatologists and scientists, and that is to do the unthinkable, and to use livestock, bunched and moving, as a proxy for former herds and predators, and mimic nature. There is no other alternative left to mankind."

Savory advocates using high technology to develop alternative energy sources and to reduce or eliminate future emissions. He supports grass fed beef and vehemently opposes industrial livestock production.

"The number one public enemy is the cow. But the number one tool that can save mankind is the cow. We need every cow we can get back out on the range. It is almost criminal to have them in feedlots which are inhumane, antisocial, and environmentally and economically unsound."

Savory condemns the practice of slash-and-burn cultivation of forests and grasslands, saying that it "leaves the soil bare, releasing carbon, and worse than that, burning one hectare of grassland gives off more, and more damaging, pollutants than 6,000 cars. And we are burning in Africa, every single year, more than one billion hectares of grasslands, and almost nobody is talking about it." One billion hectares is an area greater than that of the Sahara desert.

== Praise and criticism ==
Farmers, ranchers, pastoralists and various organizations are working globally to restore grasslands through the teaching and practice of holistic management and holistic decision making. This includes conservation projects in the US, Africa, Mexico, Argentina, Chile, Canada, and Australia in which various NGOs, government agencies and universities are practicing holistic management and its holistic planned grazing to reverse desertification using livestock as the main agent of change to restore the environment, increase ground cover, soil organic matter and water retention, replenish streams, and combat biodiversity loss.

In 2003 Australia honored Savory with the Banksia International Award "for the person doing the most for the environment on a global scale" and in 2010, Savory and the Africa Centre for Holistic Management won The Buckminster Fuller Challenge, an annual international design competition awarding $100,000 "to support the development and implementation of a strategy that has significant potential to solve humanity's most pressing problems".

Savory has faced criticism for his political and military involvement in colonial Rhodesia in the 1970s - particularly for supporting racial segregation and proposing a "Minister for Population Control" to handle the "population explosion" among Africans during his presidency of the Rhodesia Party, and for developing and teaching tracker techniques for all-white military units which were used to track and kill African nationalist insurgents fighting against the colonial government.

Savory has faced criticisms for claiming the carbon sequestration potential of holistic grazing is immune from empirical scientific study. For instance, in 2000, Savory said that "the scientific method never discovers anything" and "the scientific method protects us from cranks like me". A 2017 factsheet authored by Savory stated that "Every study of holistic planned grazing that has been done has provided results that are rejected by range scientists because there was no replication!". TABLE Debates sums this up by saying "Savory argues that standardisation, replication, and therefore experimental testing of HPG [Holistic Planned Grazing] as a whole (rather than just the grazing system associated with it) is not possible, and that therefore, it is incapable of study by experimental science", but "he does not explain how HPG can make causal knowledge claims with regards to combating desertification and climate mitigation, without recourse to science demonstrating such connections."

Savory's approach to the problem of desertification has met resistance from scientists. A meta-analysis of relevant studies between 1972 and 2016 found that Holistic Planned Grazing had no better effect than continuous grazing on plant cover and biomass, although it may have benefited some areas with higher precipitation. Conversely, three 2007 and 2010 studies document soil improvement as measured by soil carbon, soil biota, water retention, nutrient-holding capacity, and ground litter on grazed land using multi-pasture grazing methods compared to continuously grazed land. There is also evidence that multi-pasture grazing methods may increase water retention compared to non-grazed land. However, George Wuerthner, writing in The Wildlife News in a 2013 article titled, "Allan Savory: Myth And Reality" stated, "The few scientific experiments that Savory supporters cite as vindication of his methods (out of hundreds that refute his assertions), often fail to actually test his theories. Several of the studies cited on HM web site had utilization levels (degree of vegetation removed) well below the level that Savory actually recommends."

There is a less developed evidence base comparing Savory's methods with the absence of livestock on grasslands. Several peer-reviewed studies have found that excluding livestock completely from semi-arid grasslands can lead to significant recovery of vegetation and soil carbon sequestration. A 2021 peer-reviewed paper found that sparsely grazed and natural grasslands account for 80% of the total cumulative carbon sink of the world's grasslands, whereas managed grasslands have been a net greenhouse gas source over the past decade. A 2011 study found that multi-paddock grazing of the type endorsed by Savory resulted in more soil carbon sequestration than heavy continuous grazing, but very slightly less soil carbon sequestration than "graze exclosure" (excluding grazing livestock from land). Another peer-reviewed paper found that if current pastureland was restored to its former state as wild grasslands, shrublands, and sparse savannas without livestock this could store an estimated 15.2 - 59.9 Gt additional carbon.

In his TED talk, Savory claimed that holistic grazing could reduce carbon dioxide levels to pre-industrial levels in a span of 40 years. According to Skeptical Science, "it is not possible to increase productivity, increase numbers of cattle and store carbon using any grazing strategy, never-mind Holistic Management [...] Long term studies on the effect of grazing on soil carbon storage have been done before, and the results are not promising.[...] Because of the complex nature of carbon storage in soils, increasing global temperature, risk of desertification and methane emissions from livestock, it is unlikely that Holistic Management, or any management technique, can reverse climate change.". Commenting on his TED talk "'How to fight desertification and reverse climate change', Savory has since denied claiming that holistic grazing can reverse climate change, saying that "I have only used the words address climate change… although I have written and talked about reversing man-made desertification".

According to a 2016 study published by the University of Uppsala, the actual rate at which improved grazing management could contribute to carbon sequestration is seven times lower than the claims made by Savory. The study concludes that holistic management cannot reverse climate change. A study by the Food and Climate Research Network in 2017 concluded that Savory's claims about carbon sequestration were "unrealistic" and very different from those issued by peer-reviewed studies. The FCRN study estimates that, on the basis of meta-study of the scientific literature, the total global soil carbon sequestration potential from grazing management ranges from 0.3 to 0.8 Gt CO2eq per year, which is equivalent to 4-11% of total global livestock emissions, and that "Expansion or intensification in the grazing sector as an approach to sequestering more carbon would lead to substantial increases in methane, nitrous oxide and land use change-induced CO2 emissions" Project Drawdown estimates the total carbon sequestration potential of improved managed grazing at 13.72 - 20.92 Gigatons CO2eq between 2020 and 2050, equal to 0.46-0.70 Gt CO2eq per year. A 2022 peer-reviewed paper estimated the carbon sequestration potential of improved grazing management at a similar level of 0.15-0.70 Gt CO2eq per year.

In a 2012 address to the International Union for Conservation of Nature World Conservation Congress, Prince Charles said:

"I have been particularly fascinated, for example, by the work of a remarkable man called Allan Savory, in Zimbabwe and other semiarid areas, who has argued for years against the prevailing expert view that it is the simple numbers of cattle that drive overgrazing and cause fertile land to become desert. On the contrary, as he has since shown so graphically, the land needs the presence of feeding animals and their droppings for the cycle to be complete, so that soils and grassland areas stay productive. Such that, if you take grazers off the land and lock them away in vast feedlots, the land dies."

The Savory Institute was one of eleven finalists in the Virgin Earth Challenge, a 2007-2019 competition which offered a $25 million prize for whoever could demonstrate a commercially viable design that resulted in the permanent removal of greenhouse gases out of the Earth's atmosphere to contribute materially in global-warming avoidance. None of the entries satisfied all the necessary prize criteria.

== Bibliography ==
Books

- Allan Savory; Jody Butterfield (10 November 2016). Holistic Management, Third Edition: A Commonsense Revolution to Restore Our Environment. Island Press. ISBN 978-1-61091-743-8.
- Savory, Allan; Butterfield, Jody (1999) [1988]. Holistic Management: A New Framework for Decision Making. Island Press. ISBN 978-1-55963-488-5.
- Sam Bingham; Allan Savory (1993). The Holistic Resource Management Workbook. Island Press. ISBN 978-0-933280-70-0.
- Savory, Allan; Butterfield, Jody (2010). "7. The Holistic Management Framework: Ensuring Social, Environmental, and Economically Sound Development". In Ukaga (ed.). Sustainable Development: Principles, Frameworks, and Case Studies. CRC Press. pp. 149–175. ISBN 978-1-4398-2063-6.
- Savory, Allan (2013). The Grazing Revolution: A Radical Plan to Save the Earth. TED Conferences. ISBN 978-1-937382-39-1.
- Savory, Allan (2014), "13. African Holistic Management: Renewing the Soil as Economic Foundation", in Lessem (ed.), Integral Green Zimbabwe: An African Phoenix Rising, Ashgate Publishing, Ltd., pp. 197–208, ISBN 978-1-4724-3819-5

Articles

- Savory, C. R. (1965). "Game Utilisation in Rhodesia". Zoologica Africana. 1 (2): 321–327. doi:10.1080/00445096.1965.11447326.
- Savory, C. A. R. (1969). "Crisis in Rhodesia". Oryx. 10: 25–30. doi:10.1017/S0030605300007638.
- Savory, Allan; Parsons, Stanley D. (December 1980). "The Savory Grazing Method". Rangelands. 2 (6): 234–237. JSTOR 3900211.
- Savory, Allan (August 1983). "The Savory Grazing Method or Holistic Resource Management". Rangelands. 5 (4): 155–159. JSTOR 3900847.
- Savory, A. (1994). "Will we be able to sustain civilization?". Population and Environment. 16 (2): 139–147. Bibcode:1994PopEn..16..139S. doi:10.1007/BF02208780. S2CID 154622507.

== See also ==
- Agroecology
- Joel Salatin
- Tragedy of the commons
