= Buckminster Fuller Challenge =

- Awarded for: Comprehensive solutions to global challenges
- Country: United States
- Presented by: Buckminster Fuller Institute
- Reward: $100,000
- First award: 2007
- Website: bfi.org/challenge

The Buckminster Fuller Challenge is an annual international design competition that awards $100,000 to the most comprehensive solution to a pressing global problem. The Challenge was launched in 2007 and is a program of The Buckminster Fuller Institute. The competition, open to designers, artists, architects, students, environmentalists, and organizations world-wide, has been dubbed "Socially-Responsible Design's Highest Award" by Metropolis Magazine.

According to the Buckminster Fuller Challenge website: "Winning solutions are regionally specific yet globally applicable and present a truly comprehensive, anticipatory, integrated approach to solving the world's complex problems." Furthermore, the criteria of the Challenge calls not for a stand-alone solution, but an integrated strategy that addresses social, environmental, economic and cultural issues. This is aligned with the design approach of Buckminster Fuller, which he referred to as "comprehensive anticipatory design science".

Winners of the Buckminster Fuller Challenge include John Todd (2008), MIT's Smart Cities Group (2009), , Allan Savory and the Africa Center for Holistic management (2010), Blue Ventures (2011), the Living Building Challenge (2012), and GreenWave (2015).

Each year's winner is ultimately decided by an international jury of renowned whole systems thinkers and practitioners of sustainability. Former jury members include Jose Zaglul, Alan Kay, Mitchell Joachim, Adam Bly, Jamais Cascio, Nicholas Grimshaw, Hunter Lovins, William McDonough, Janine Benyus, and Danny Hillis.

Although there is only one winner per year, the majority of the entries received are featured on the Buckminster Fuller Challenge website within a fully searchable database known as the Idea Index.
