= Holistic management (agriculture) =

Agricultural technique

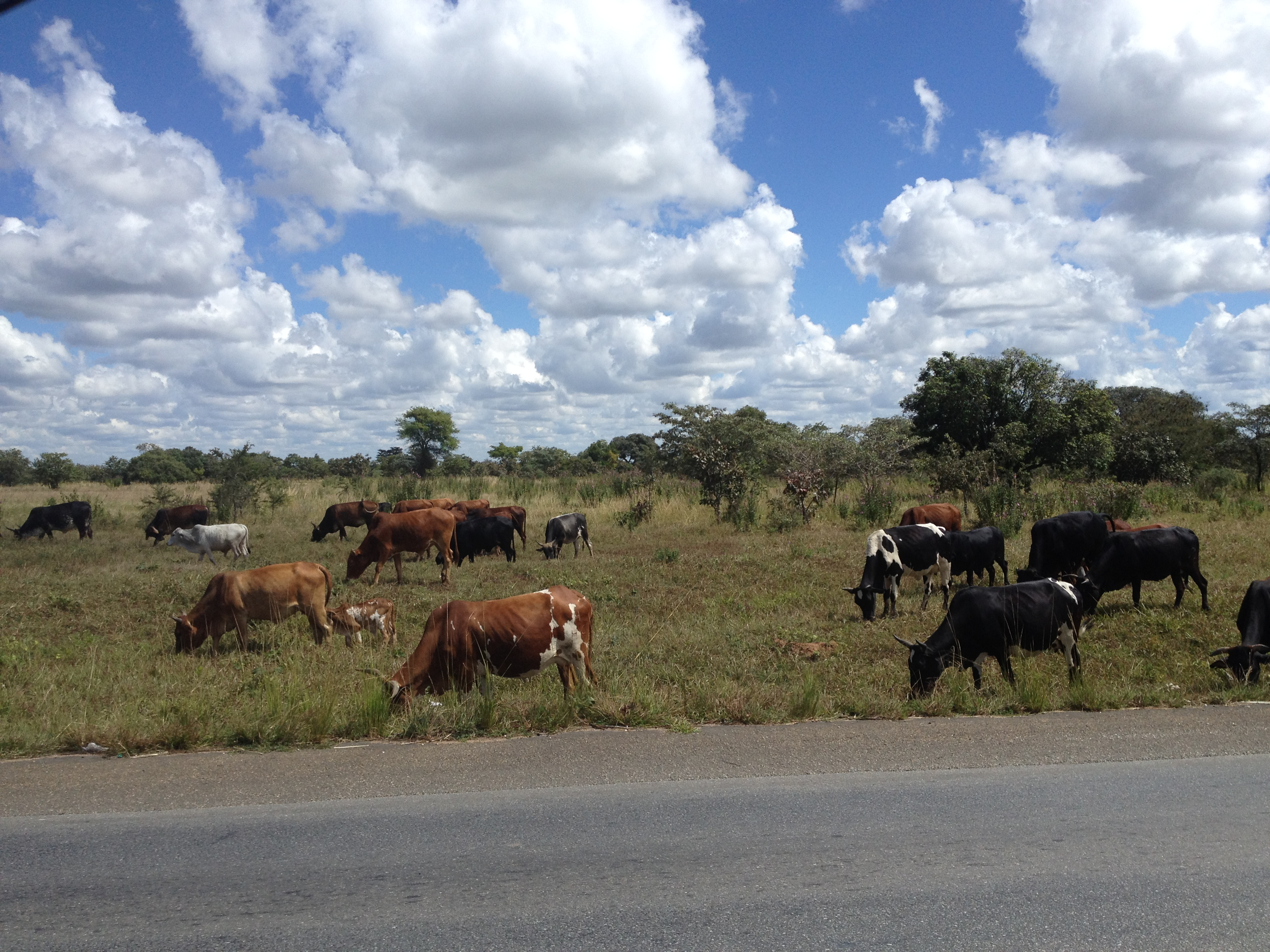
Holistic management was developed as an approach to managing resources for grazing management.

In agriculture, holistic management (from ὅλος holos, a Greek word meaning "all, whole, entire, total") is an approach to managing resources that was originally developed by Allan Savory for grazing management. Holistic management has been likened to "a permaculture approach to rangeland management". Holistic management is a registered trademark of Holistic Management International (no longer associated with Allan Savory). It has faced criticism from many researchers who argue it is unable to provide the benefits claimed.

== Definition ==
"Holistic management" describes a systems thinking approach to managing resources. Originally developed by Allan Savory, it is now being adapted for use in managing other systems with complex social, ecological and economic factors.

Holistic planned grazing (HPG) is similar to rotational grazing but differs in that it more explicitly recognizes and provides a framework for adapting to the four basic ecosystem processes: the water cycle, the mineral cycle including the carbon cycle, energy flow, and community dynamics (the relationship between organisms in an ecosystem), giving equal importance to livestock production and social welfare. Holistic Management has been likened to "a permaculture approach to rangeland management".

=== Framework ===
The Holistic Management decision-making framework uses six key steps to guide the management of resources:

1. Define in its entirety what you are managing. No area should be treated as a single-product system. By defining the whole, people are better able to manage. This includes identifying the available resources, including money, that the manager has at his disposal.
2. Define what you want now and for the future. Set the objectives, goals and actions needed to produce the quality of life sought, and what the life-nurturing environment must be like to sustain that quality of life far into the future.
3. Watch for the earliest indicators of ecosystem health. Identify the ecosystem services that have deep impacts for people in both urban and rural environments, and find a way to easily monitor them. One of the best examples of an early indicator of a poorly functioning environment is patches of bare ground. An indicator of a better functioning environment is newly sprouting diversity of plants and a return or increase of wildlife.
4. Don't limit the management tools you use. The eight tools for managing natural resources are money/labor, human creativity, grazing, animal impact, fire, rest, living organisms and science/technology. To be successful you need to use all these tools to the best of your ability.
5. Test your decisions with questions that are designed to help ensure all your decisions are socially, environmentally and financially sound for both the short and long term.
6. Monitor proactively, before your managed system becomes more imbalanced. This way the manager can take adaptive corrective action quickly, before the ecosystem services are lost. Always assume your plan is less than perfect and use a feedback loop that includes monitoring for the earliest signs of failure, adjusting and re-planning as needed. In other words use a "canary in a coal mine" approach.

=== Four principles ===
Savory stated four key principles of Holistic Management planned grazing, which he intended to take advantage of the symbiotic relationship between large herds of grazing animals and the grasslands that support them:

1. Nature functions as a holistic community with a mutualistic relationship between people, animals and the land. If you remove or change the behavior of any keystone species like the large grazing herds, you have an unexpected and wide-ranging negative impact on other areas of the environment.
2. It is absolutely crucial that any agricultural planning system must be flexible enough to adapt to nature's complexity, since all environments are different and have constantly changing local conditions.
3. Animal husbandry using domestic species can be used as a substitute for lost keystone species. Thus when managed properly in a way that mimics nature, agriculture can heal the land and even benefit wildlife, while at the same time benefiting people.
4. Time and timing is the most important factor when planning land use. Not only is it crucial to understand how long to use the land for agriculture and how long to rest, it is equally important to understand exactly when and where the land is ready for that use and rest.

== Development ==
The idea of holistic planned grazing was developed in the 1960s by Allan Savory, a wildlife biologist in his native Southern Rhodesia. Setting out to understand desertification in the context of the larger environmental movement, and influenced by the work of André Voisin, he hypothesized that the spread of deserts, the loss of wildlife, and the resulting human impoverishment were related to the reduction of the natural herds of large grazing animals and, even more, the changed behavior of the few remaining herds. Savory hypothesized further that livestock could be substituted for natural herds to provide important ecosystem services like nutrient cycling. However, while livestock managers had found that rotational grazing systems can work for livestock management purposes, scientific experiments demonstrated it does not necessarily improve ecological issues such as desertification. As Savory saw it, a more comprehensive framework for the management of grassland systems — an adaptive, holistic management plan — was needed. For that reason Holistic Management has been used as a Whole Farm/Ranch Planning tool In 1984, he founded the Center for Holistic Resource Management which became Holistic Management International.

In many regions, pastoralism and communal land use are blamed for environmental degradation caused by overgrazing. After years of research and experience, Savory came to understand this assertion was often wrong, and that sometimes removing animals actually made matters worse. This concept is a variation of the trophic cascade, where humans are seen as the top level predator and the cascade follows from there.

Savory developed a management system that he claimed would improve grazing systems. Holistic planned grazing is one of a number of newer grazing management systems that aim to more closely simulate the behavior of natural herds of wildlife and has been claimed to improve riparian habitats and water quality over systems that often led to land degradation, and claimed to improve range condition for both livestock and wildlife.

Savory claims that Holistic Planned Grazing holds potential in mitigating climate change, while building soil, increasing biodiversity, and reversing desertification. This practice uses fencing and/or herders to restore grasslands. Carefully planned movements of large herds of livestock mimic the processes of nature where grazing animals are kept concentrated by pack predators and forced to move on after eating, trampling, and manuring an area, returning only after it has fully recovered. This grazing method seeks to emulate what occurred during the past 40 million years as the expansion of grass-grazer ecosystems built deep, rich grassland soils, sequestering carbon, and consequently cooling the planet.

== Uses ==
While originally developed as a tool for range land use and restoring desertified land, the Holistic Management system can be applied to other areas with multiple complex socioeconomic and environmental factors. One such example is integrated water resources management, which promotes sector integration in development and management of water resources to ensure that water is allocated fairly between different users, maximizing economic and social welfare without compromising the sustainability of vital ecosystems. Another example is mine reclamation. A fourth use of Holistic Management® is in certain forms of no till crop production, intercropping, and permaculture. Holistic Management has been acknowledged by the United States Department of Agriculture. The most comprehensive use of Holistic Management is as a Whole Farm/Ranch Planning tool which has been used successfully by farmers and ranchers. For that reason, the USDA invested six years of Beginning Farmer/Rancher Development funding to use it to train beginning women farmers and ranchers.

== Criticism ==
There are many peer-reviewed studies and journalistic publications that dispute the claims of Holistic Management theory.

A 2014 review examined five specific ecological assumptions of Holistic Management and found that none were supported by scientific evidence in the Western US. A paper by Richard Teague et al. claims that the different criticisms had examined rotational systems in general and not holistic planned grazing. A meta-analysis of relevant studies between 1972 and 2016 found that Holistic Planned Grazing had no better effect than continuous grazing on plant cover, plant biomass and animal production, although it may have benefited some areas with higher precipitation. Conversely, at least three studies have documented soil improvement as measured by soil carbon, soil nitrogen, soil biota, water retention, nutrient-holding capacity, and ground litter on grazed land using multi-pasture grazing methods compared to continuously grazed land.

There is also evidence that multi-pasture grazing methods may increase water retention compared to non-grazed land. However, George Wuerthner, writing in The Wildlife News in a 2013 article titled, "Allan Savory: Myth And Reality" stated, "The few scientific experiments that Savory supporters cite as vindication of his methods (out of hundreds that refute his assertions), often fail to actually test his theories. Several of the studies cited on HM web site had utilization levels (degree of vegetation removed) well below the level that Savory actually recommends."

These critiques have been challenged on the grounds that many studies examined rotational grazing systems in general and not Holistic Management or Holistic Planned Grazing. In addition to a grazing method, Holistic Management involves goal setting, experiential learning and an emphasis on monitoring and adaptive decision-making that have not been captured by many scientific field trials. This has been proposed as a reason why many land managers have reported a more positive experience of Holistic Management than scientific studies. However, a 2022 review of 22 "farm-scale" studies, many of which included adaptive management, again found that Holistic Management had no effect on or reduced plant or animal productivity. The same study found that Holistic Management was associated with improved social cohesion and peer-to-peer learning, but concluded that the "social cohesion, learning and networking so prevalent on HM farms could be adopted by any farming community without accepting the unfounded HM rhetoric".

=== Carbon sequestration claims ===
Savory has also faced criticisms for claiming the carbon sequestration potential of holistic grazing is immune from empirical scientific study. For instance, in 2000, Savory said that "the scientific method never discovers anything" and "the scientific method protects us from cranks like me". A 2017 factsheet authored by Savory stated that "Every study of holistic planned grazing that has been done has provided results that are rejected by range scientists because there was no replication!". TABLE Debates sums this up by saying "Savory argues that standardisation, replication, and therefore experimental testing of HPG [Holistic Planned Grazing] as a whole (rather than just the grazing system associated with it) is not possible, and that therefore, it is incapable of study by experimental science", but "he does not explain how HPG can make causal knowledge claims with regards to combating desertification and climate mitigation, without recourse to science demonstrating such connections."

There is a less developed evidence base comparing Holistic management with the absence of livestock on grasslands. Several peer-reviewed studies have found that excluding livestock completely from semi-arid grasslands can lead to significant recovery of vegetation and soil carbon sequestration. A 2021 peer-reviewed paper found that sparsely grazed and natural grasslands account for 80% of the total cumulative carbon sink of the world's grasslands, whereas managed grasslands (i.e. with greater livestock density) have been a net greenhouse gas source over the past decade. A 2011 study found that multi-paddock grazing of the type endorsed by Savory resulted in more soil carbon sequestration than heavy continuous grazing, but very slightly less soil carbon sequestration than "graze exclosure" (excluding grazing livestock from land). Another peer-reviewed paper found that if current pastureland was restored to its former state as wild grasslands, shrublands, and sparse savannas without livestock this could store an estimated 15.2 - 59.9 Gt additional carbon.

In 2013 the Savory Institute published a response to some of their critics. The same month Savory was a guest speaker with TED and gave a presentation titled "How to Fight Desertification and Reverse Climate Change". In his TED Talk, Savory has claimed that holistic grazing could reduce carbon dioxide levels to pre-industrial levels in a span of 40 years, solving the problems caused by climate change. Commenting on his TED talk, Savory has since denied claiming that holistic grazing can reverse climate change, saying that "I have only used the words address climate change… although I have written and talked about reversing man-made desertification".

RealClimate.org published a piece saying that Savory's claims that his technique can bring atmospheric carbon "back to pre-industrial levels" are "simply not reasonable." According to Skeptical Science, "it is not possible to increase productivity, increase numbers of cattle and store carbon using any grazing strategy, never-mind Holistic Management [...] Long term studies on the effect of grazing on soil carbon storage have been done before, and the results are not promising.[...] Because of the complex nature of carbon storage in soils, increasing global temperature, risk of desertification and methane emissions from livestock, it is unlikely that Holistic Management, or any management technique, can reverse climate change.

According to a 2016 study published by the Swedish University of Agricultural Sciences, the actual rate at which improved grazing management could contribute to carbon sequestration is seven times lower than the claims made by Savory. The study concludes that Holistic Management cannot reverse climate change. A study by the Food and Climate Research Network in 2017 has concluded that Savory's claims about carbon sequestration are "unrealistic" and very different from those issued by peer-reviewed studies. The FCRN study estimates that, on the basis of meta-study of the scientific literature, the total global soil carbon sequestration potential from grazing management ranges from 0.3-0.8 Gt CO2eq per year, which is equivalent to offsetting a maximum of 4-11% of current total global livestock emissions, and that "Expansion or intensification in the grazing sector as an approach to sequestering more carbon would lead to substantial increases in methane, nitrous oxide and land use change-induced CO2 emissions" Project Drawdown estimates the total carbon sequestration potential of improved managed grazing at 13.72 - 20.92 Gigatons CO2eq between 2020–2050, equal to 0.46-0.70 Gt CO2eq per year. A 2022 peer-reviewed paper estimated the carbon sequestration potential of improved grazing management at a similar level of 0.15-0.70 Gt CO2eq per year.

== Awards ==
Savory received the 2003 Banksia International Award and in 2010 the Africa Centre for Holistic Management in Zimbabwe, Operation Hope (a "proof of concept" project using Holistic Management) was named the winner of the 2010 Buckminster Fuller Challenge for "recognizing initiatives which take a comprehensive, anticipatory, design approach to radically advance human well being and the health of our planet's ecosystems".

In addition, numerous Holistic Management practitioners have received awards for their environmental stewardship through using Holistic Management practices.

== See also ==
- Desert greening
- Conservation grazing
- Ecoagriculture
- Permaculture
- Regenerative agriculture
- Sustainable agriculture
- Sustainable land management
