= Arizona World War II Army Airfields =

Arizona World War II Army Airfields

Site information
- Type: Army Airfields

Location
- Map of Arizona World War II Army airfields

Site history
- Built: 1940–1944

During World War II, the United States Army Air Forces (USAAF) established numerous airfields in Arizona for training pilots and aircrews of USAAF fighters and bombers.

Most of these airfields were under the command of Fourth Air Force or the Army Air Forces Training Command (AAFTC) (A predecessor of the current-day United States Air Force Air Education and Training Command). However, the other USAAF support commands (Air Technical Service Command (ATSC); Air Transport Command (ATC) or Troop Carrier Command) commanded a significant number of airfields in a support roles.

It is still possible to find remnants of these wartime airfields. Many were converted into municipal airports, some were returned to agriculture and several were retained as United States Air Force installations and were front-line bases during the Cold War. Hundreds of the temporary buildings that were used survive today, and are being used for other purposes.

== Major airfields ==
Air Transport Command

- Coolidge Army Air Field, 6 miles (9.7 km) southeast of Coolidge

Now: Coolidge Municipal Airport (FAA LID: P08)

- Winslow Municipal Airport, Winslow

Now: Winslow–Lindbergh Regional Airport (IATA: INW, ICAO: KINW)

Fourth Air Force

- Davis–Monthan Field, Tucson

32nd Air Base Squadron / 32nd Base Headquarters and Air Base Squadron; 20 April 1941–1 April 1944
233rd Army Air Force Base Unit (Combat Crew Training Station, Very Heavy)(Second AF); 1 April 1944–16 November 1945
Now: Davis–Monthan Air Force Base (IATA: DMA, ICAO: KDMA)
- Sahuarita Flight Strip 31°57′48″N 110°55′26″W (2 mi (3.2 km) east of Sahuarita)

Aux to Davis–Monthan AAF
Now: S. Sahuarita Park Rd.

Air Technical Service Command

- Tucson Army Air Field, Tucson

Joint Use USAAF/Civil Airport
Now: Tucson International Airport (IATA: TUS, ICAO: KTUS) and Morris Air National Guard Base, home to the 162d Fighter Wing, Arizona Air National Guard

Civilian Pilot Training Program

- Ernest A. Love Field, Prescott

Joint Use USAAF/USN/Civil Airport
Now: Prescott Municipal Airport (IATA: PRC, ICAO: KPRC)

Army Air Forces Training Command

- Douglas Army Air Field, 8 miles (13 km) north-northwest of Douglas

Army Air Forces Advanced Flying School (Two Engine) / Army Air Forces Pilot School (Advanced, Two Engine) (West Coast AAF Training Center); October 1942–23 October 1945
461st Base Headquarters and Air Base Squadron; 1 November 1942–30 April 1944
3014th Army Air Force Base Unit; 1 May 1944–1 November 1945
Now: Bisbee Douglas International Airport
(IATA: DUG, ICAO: KDUG, FAA LID: DUG)
- Hereford Army Airfield, 2 mi (3.2 km) west-southwest of Hereford

Auxiliary of Douglas Army Air Field
Now: Airfield closed and abandoned

- Falcon Field Army Air Field, Mesa

Western Flight Training Center
Now: Falcon Field Airport (IATA: MSC, ICAO: KFFZ)

- Kingman Army Airfield, 7 miles (11 km) northeast of Kingman

Army Air Forces Gunnery School/Army Air Forces Flexible Gunnery School; 4 August 1942–30 June 1945
460th Base Headquarters and Air Base Squadron; 26 December 1942–30 April 1944
3018th Army Air Forces Base Unit; 1 May 1944–30 June 1945
Now: Kingman Airport and Industrial Park (IATA: IGM, ICAO: KIGM)
- Yucca Army Airfield, 1 mile (1.6 km) west of Yucca

Sub-base of Kingman Army Airfield
Now: Chrysler Arizona Proving Ground (Non flying facility)

- Luke Field, Glendale

Air Corps Advanced Flying School (Single Engine)/Army Air Forces Advanced Flying School (Single Engine)/AAF Pilot School (Advanced, Single Engine); 20 May 1941–4 July 1946
66th Air Base Squadron/66th Base Headquarters and Air Base Squadron; 15 June 1941–30 April 1944
3028th Army Air Forces Base Unit; 1 May 1944–30 November 1946
Now: Luke Air Force Base (IATA: LUF, ICAO: KLUF)
- Ajo Army Air Field, 5 miles (8.0 km) north of Ajo

Army Air Forces Advanced Flying School, Fixed Gunnery; 29 August 1942–15 December 1945
472nd Base Headquarters and Air Base Squadron; 29 August 1942–30 April 1944
3011th Army Air Forces Base Unit; 1 May 1944–15 December 1945
Now: Eric Marcus Municipal Airport (FAA LID: P01)

- Gila Bend Army Air Field, 3 miles (4.8 km) southeast of Gila Bend

Sub–base of Luke Army Airfield
492nd Base Headquarters and Air Base Squadron; 25 January 1943–30 April 1944
3029th Army Air Forces Base Unit; 1 May 1944–15 January 1945
Now: Gila Bend Air Force Auxiliary Field (ICAO: KGXF)

Army Air Forces Western Flying Training Command

- Marana Army Air Field, 7 miles (11 km) northwest of Marana

Army Air Forces Basic Flying School / Army Air Forces Pilot School (Basic); 8 July 1942–15 September 1945
389th Base Headquarters and Air Base Squadron; 8 August 1942–30 April 1944
3024th Army Air Forces Base Unit; 1 May 1944–1 November 1945
Now: Pinal Airpark (IATA: MZJ, ICAO: KMZJ)

Auxiliaries of Marana Army Air Field

- Marana Auxiliary Army Airfield No. 1, aka Picacho Field in Picacho

Now: Picacho Stagefield ARNG Heliport (ICAO: KPCA)

- Marana Auxiliary Army Airfield No. 2, aka Rillito Field in Marana

Now: Marana Regional Airport (IATA: AVW, ICAO: KAVQ)

- Marana Auxiliary Army Airfield No. 5, aka Sahuaro Field in Pima County

Now: El Tiro Gliderport (FAA LID: AZ67)

- Ryan Army Airfield, Tucson

Contract Primary Flying Training; 25 June 1942–September 1944
11th Army Air Forces Flying Training Detachment (Primary); 10 July 1942–30 April 1944
3049th Army Air Forces Base Unit; 1 May 1944–September 1944
Today: Ryan Airfield (IATA: RYN, ICAO: KRYN)

- Thunderbird Field No. 1, Glendale

Contract Primary Flying Training; 12 July 1941–1 May 1945
Air Corps Training Detachment/6th Army Air Forces Flying Training Detachment (Primary); 12 July 1941–30 April 1944
3040th Army Air Forces Base Unit; 1 May 1944–27 June 1945
Now: Arizona Christian University (Non flying facility)

- Thunderbird Field No 2, Scottsdale

Contract Primary Flying Training; 24 June 1942–16 October 1944
12th Army Air Forces Flying Training Detachment (Primary); 10 July 1942–30 April 1944
3048th Army Air Forces Base Unit; 1 May 1944–16 October 1944
Now: Scottsdale Airport (IATA: SCF, ICAO: KSDL)

- Williams Field, Mesa

Army Air Forces Advanced Flying School (Two Engine)/Army Air Forces Pilot School (Advanced, Two Engine); 26 June 1941–1 June 1948
89th Air Base Squadron/89th Base Headquarters and Air Base Squadron; 4 December 1941–30 April 1944
3010th Army Air Forces Base Unit/3010th Air Force Base Unit; 1 May 1944–28 August 1948
Was: Williams Air Force Base (1947–1993)
Now: Phoenix–Mesa Gateway Airport (IATA: AZA, ICAO: KIWA)

Auxiliaries of Williams Air Force Base

- Williams Field Auxiliary No. 2 aka Rittenhouse Field in Queen Creek

Now: Rittenhouse Army Heliport (FAA LID: AZ38)

- Williams Field Auxiliary No. 3 aka Casa Grande Field in Casa Grande.

Today: Casa Grande Municipal Airport (ICAO: KCGZ, FAA LID: CGZ)

- Williams Auxiliary Airfield No. 5 aka Goodyear Auxiliary Airfield in Gila River Indian Reservation

Now: Gila River Memorial Airport (FAA LID: 34AZ)

- Yuma Army Air Field, 4 miles (6.4 km) south of Yuma

AAF Advanced Flying School (Single Engine)/AAF Pilot School (Advanced Single Engine)/AAF Flexible Gunnery School/AAF Radar Observer School; September 1942–1 November 1945
403rd Base Headquarters and Air Base Squadron; September 1942–30 April 1944
3036th Army Air Forces Base Unit; 1 May 1944–1 November 1945
Was: Vincent Air Force Base (1951–1959)
Now: Marine Corps Air Station Yuma (IATA: YUM, ICAO: KYUM)

Sub-bases of Yuma Army Air Field

- Dateland Army Air Field, 10 miles (16 km) east of Yuma

Now: Airfield closed and abandoned

- Laguna Army Airfield, 12 miles (19 km) northeast of Yuma

Now: Laguna Army Airfield (IATA: LGF, ICAO: KLGF)

- Yuma Auxiliary Army Airfield No. 1

Now: Redeveloped as part of Fortuna Foothills

- Yuma Auxiliary Army Airfield No. 2

Now: Marine Corps Air Station Yuma Auxiliary Airfield on the Barry M. Goldwater Air Force Range

- Yuma Auxiliary Army Airfield No. 3

Now: Redeveloped as agricultural fields

- Yuma Auxiliary Army Airfield No. 4 aka Rolle Field, 14 miles (23 km) south of Yuma

Now: Rolle Airfield (FAA LID: 44A)

- Yuma Auxiliary Army Airfield No. 5 in Wellton

Now: Airfield closed and abandoned

- Yuma Auxiliary Army Airfield No. 6, aka Colfred, 45 miles (72 km) east of Yuma, later used as a drone and hawk missile testing site.

Now: Airfield closed and abandoned

- Yuma Auxiliary Army Airfield No. 7 in Stoval

Now: training field on the Barry M. Goldwater Air Force Range

== See also ==
- Arizona during World War II
- Echeverria Field
