= 37th Flying Training Wing (World War II) =

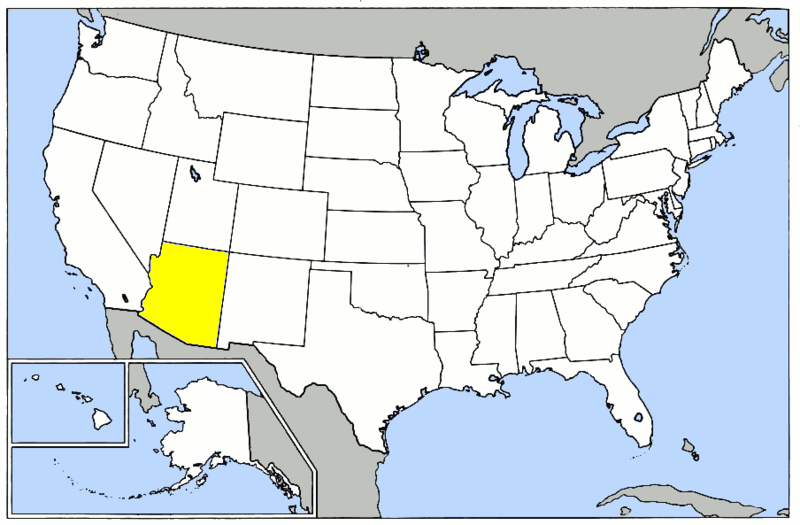
- Locations of airfields controlled by the 37th Flying Training Wing
- Active: 1942–1946
- Country: United States
- Branch: United States Army Air Forces
- Type: Command and Control
- Role: Training
- Part of: Western Flying Training Command
- Engagements: World War II: World War II American Theater

The 37th Flying Training Wing is an inactive United States Army Air Forces unit. It was last assigned to the Western Flying Training Command, and was disbanded on 16 June 1946 at Luke Field, Arizona.

There is no lineage between the United States Air Force 37th Training Wing, established on 22 December 1939 as the 37th Pursuit Group (Interceptor) at Albrook Army Airfield, Panama Canal Zone, and this organization.

== History ==
The wing directed Training Command Flight Schools in Arizona. Most of the assigned schools provided phase II basic and phase II advanced flying training for Air Cadets, although the wing also commanded both contract basic (phase I) and Army schools. Graduates of the advanced schools were commissioned as Second Lieutenants, received their "wings" and were reassigned to Operational or Replacement Training Units operated by one of the four numbered air fores in the zone of interior.

As training requirements changed during the war, schools were activated and inactivated or transferred to meet those requirements.

=== Lineage ===
- Established as 37th Flying Training Wing on 17 December 1942

Activated on 8 January 1943
Disbanded 16 June 1946.

=== Assignments ===
- AAF West Coast (later, AAF Western Flying) Training Center, 8 January 1943 – 16 June 1946

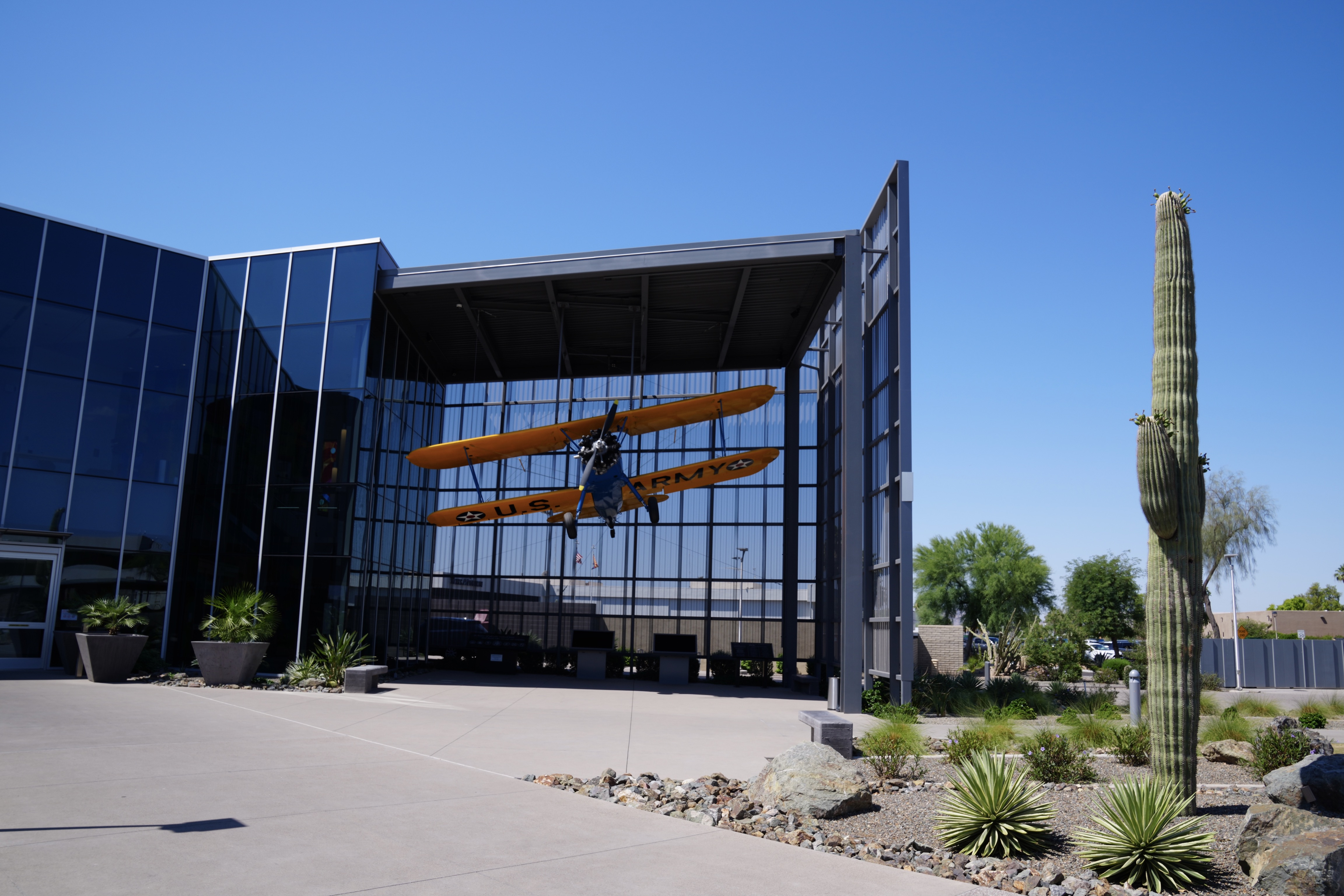
A Stearman PT-17, a historic World War II plane of the type used to train pilots in Scottsdale in World War II

=== Training aircraft ===
The schools of the wing used a wide variety of planes to support its numerous training needs:

- Primary training aircraft were the Boeing-Stearman PT-17 and Ryan PT-22. PT-13 and PT-27 aircraft were also used which were basic Stearmans with varying horsepower ratings.
- The Vultee BT-13 was the basic training aircraft, along with its cousin the Vultee BT-15
- The North American AT-6 was used as the single-engine advanced trainer
- The Cessna AT-17 Bobcat was the standard two-engine advanced trainer, along with the Cessna UC-78 variant of the AT-17

Curtiss-Wright AT-9s were used for high performance two-engine training in perpetration for Lockheed P-38 Lightning training
Beechcraft AT-10s were used for pilots in training for two engine bombers (B-25s and B-26s)
Beechcraft AT-11s were used for pilots in training for C-47 transports

=== Assigned Schools ===
Ajo Army Airfield, Arizona
AAF Flying Gunnery School (Fixed)
330th Gunnery Training Group
Opened: August 1942, Closed: April 1945 (AT-6, AT-9)
Satellite of Luke Field; taken over by Williams Field, 1 July 1943

Dateland Army Airfield, Dateland, Arizona
AAF Advanced Flying School, Two-Engine
Satellite of Yuma Army Airfield
Airfield supported gunnery training, no permanent aircraft assigned

Douglas Army Airfield, Douglas, Arizona
AAF Advanced Flying School, Two-Engine, also Two-Engine Transition
310th Two-Engine Flying Training Group
Opened: August 1942, Closed: November 1945 (AT-9, AT-17, UC-78, AT-24)
Aircraft carried fuselage code: "A"; Became exclusive B-25 Mitchell and B-26 Marauder two-engine transition school October 1944, closed November 1945

Echeverria Field, Wickenburg, Arizona
AAF Contract Pilot School (Primary)
5th Glider Training Detachment
Opened: October 1941, Closed: April 1944 (PT-17, PT-27, PT-13)
Operated by: Claiborne Flight Academy; Glider training Jan 1941 – Feb 1943; Primary flight training February 1943 – April 1944

Gila Bend Gunnery Range, Gila Bend, Arizona
AAF Flying Gunnery School (Fixed)
Opened: September 1942, Closed: September 1944 (AT-6)
Satellite of Luke Field, operated AT-6s for gunnery practice

Luke Field, Phoenix, Arizona
AAF Advanced Flying School, Single-Engine
AAF Advanced Flying School, Single-Engine (Transition)
330th Single Engine Flying Training Group
Opened: March 1941, Closed: July 1946 (PT-17, AT-6, P-36, P-39, P-40)
Aircraft carried fuselage code "X"; AT-6s flown from July 1941 until end of war; transition school operated P-36s (1941), P-39s, P-40s; Advanced Flying School closed July 1946; remained open as training base, becoming Luke Air Force Base in 1948.

Marana Army Air Field, Marana, Arizona
AAF Basic Flying School
AAF Advanced Flying School, Single-Engine
Opened: August 1942, Closed: August 1945 (BT-13, AT-6)
Aircraft carried fuselage code: "S"; Became advanced single-engine school October 1944

Ryan Army Airfield, Tucson, Arizona
AAF Contract Pilot School (Primary)
11th Flying Training Detachment
Opened: July 1942, Closed: September 1944 (PT-17, PT-22, PT-27)
Operated by: Ryan School of Aeronautics, Hemet, California; transferred to United States Marine Corps, April 1945

Thunderbird Field No. 1, Phoenix, Arizona
AAF Contract Pilot School (Primary)
6th Flying Training Detachment
Opened: September 1939, Closed: July 1945 (PT-13, PT-17)
Operated by: Thunderbird Corporation

Thunderbird Field No. 2, Scottsdale, Arizona
AAF Contract Pilot School (Primary)
12th Flying Training Detachment
Opened: June 1942, Closed: October 1944 (PT-17)
Operated by: Thunderbird Corporation

Williams Field, Chandler, Arizona
AAF Advanced Flying School, Single-Engine
AAF Advanced Flying School, Two/Four-Engine, also Two/Four-Engine Transition
Opened: January 1942, Closed: June 1948 (AT-6, AT-9, AT-10, AT-11, AT-17, B-25, B-17, B-24)
Aircraft carried fuselage code: "Y" Became single-engine AT-6 school in December 1943; Two/Four engine training beginning May 1945; became permanent USAF Williams Air Force Base, 1948. Closed 1993

Yuma Army Airfield, Yuma, Arizona
AAF Advanced Flying School, Single-Engine
AAF Advanced Flying School, Two-Engine, also Two-Engine Transition
307th Single-Engine Flying Training Group
Opened: November 1942, Closed: December 1945 (AT-6, AT-9, AT-17, UC-78, B-25)
Aircraft carried fuselage code: "U"; Also operated Yuma gunnery and bombing ranges

=== Stations ===
- Luke Field, Arizona, 8 January 1943 – 16 June 1946.

== See also ==
- Army Air Forces Training Command
- Other Western Flying Training Command Flight Training Wings:

35th Flying Training Wing (World War II) Basic/Advanced Flight Training (California)
36th Flying Training Wing (World War II) Primary Flight Training
38th Flying Training Wing (World War II) Bombardier and Specialized 2/4-Engine Training
81st Flying Training Wing (World War II) Classification/Preflight Unit
