= Picacho Stagefield ARNG Heliport =

Arizona National Guard heliport

Picacho ARNG Heliport
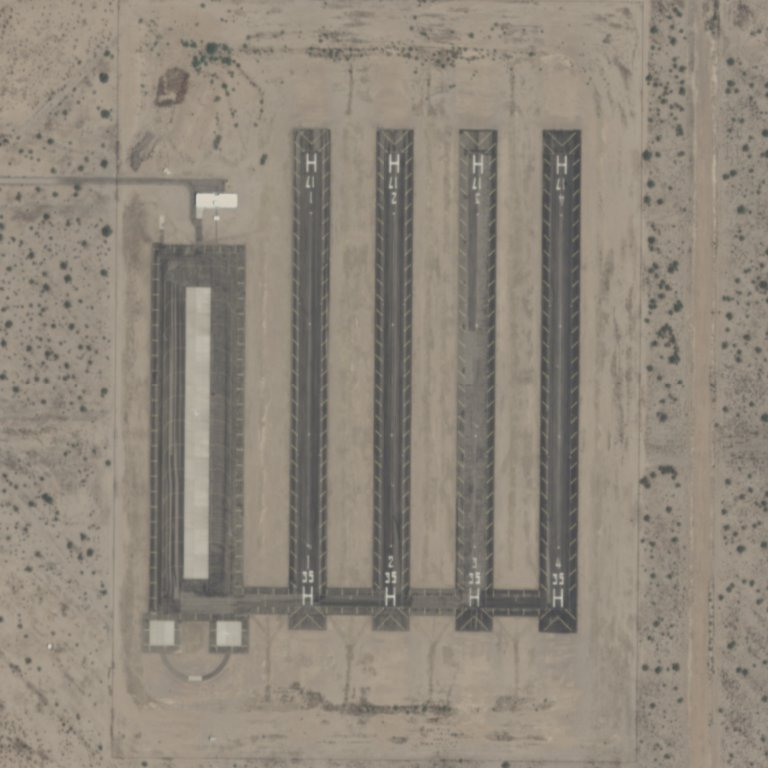
- IATA: none; ICAO: KPCA; FAA LID: PCA

Summary
- Airport type: Private use; permission required prior to landing
- Owner: United States Army
- Operator: Arizona Army National Guard
- Serves: Tucson, Arizona
- Location: Picacho, Arizona
- Built: 1943
- Elevation AMSL: 1,669 ft / 509 m
- Coordinates: 32°39′48″N 111°29′14″W

Map

Helipads
Number	Length		Surface
Number	ft	m	Surface
H1	1,500	457	Asphalt
H2	1,500	457	Asphalt
H3	1,500	457	Asphalt
H4	1,500	457	Asphalt

Picacho Army National Guard Heliport (ICAO: KPCA, FAA LID: PCA), also known as Picacho Stagefield Heliport, formally Marana Auxiliary Army Airfield No. 1 (Picacho Field), is an Arizona Army National Guard towered training field 4 miles (3.5 nmi; 6.4 km) southeast of Picacho, Arizona. The airport is owned and operated by the United States Army. The field serves as a training facility for the Western Army National Guard Aviation Training Site based out of Pinal Airpark.

Picacho ARNG Heliport is a towered airfield but is not associated with any Class D Airspace, as you can see from the Phoenix sectional chart. Even so, pilots are required to contact the tower in accordance with 14 CFR 91.126 and 91.127. To identify towered airports on the chart, pilots should rely on the color of the airport symbol, and not assume there will be a Class D ring.

Marana Auxiliary Army Airfield No. 1 (aka Picacho Field) was one of five auxiliary fields that served Marana Army Air Field (now: Pinal Airpark) and is part of many Arizona World War II Army Airfields. Picacho Field first appeared on the Phoenix sectional chart in 1945.

== Facilities ==
Picacho ARNG Heliport has four asphalt paved runways/helipads:

- Helipad H1 measuring 1,500 ft × 75 ft (457 m × 23 m)
- Helipad H2 measuring 1,500 ft × 75 ft (457 m × 23 m)
- Helipad H3 measuring 1,500 ft × 75 ft (457 m × 23 m)
- Helipad H4 measuring 1,500 ft × 75 ft (457 m × 23 m)

== See also ==
- Pinal Airpark
- Arizona World War II Army Airfields
- List of airports in Arizona
