= KDUG =

KDUG may refer to:

- Bisbee-Douglas International Airport (ICAO code KDUG)
- KDUG-LD, a defunct low-power television station (channel 21) formerly licensed to serve Hemet, California, United States
