= LGF =

LGF may refer to:

- The Lesbian & Gay Foundation, a British charity
- the FAA location identifier for Laguna Army Airfield, a military airport located at Yuma Proving Ground, Arizona, United States
- Little Green Footballs, an American political blog
- Longfield railway station, Kent, National Rail station code
- Lionsgate Films, the film studio division of Lionsgate
