= Eric Marcus Municipal Airport =

Airport in Pima County, Arizona

Eric Marcus Municipal Airport Ajo Municipal Airport
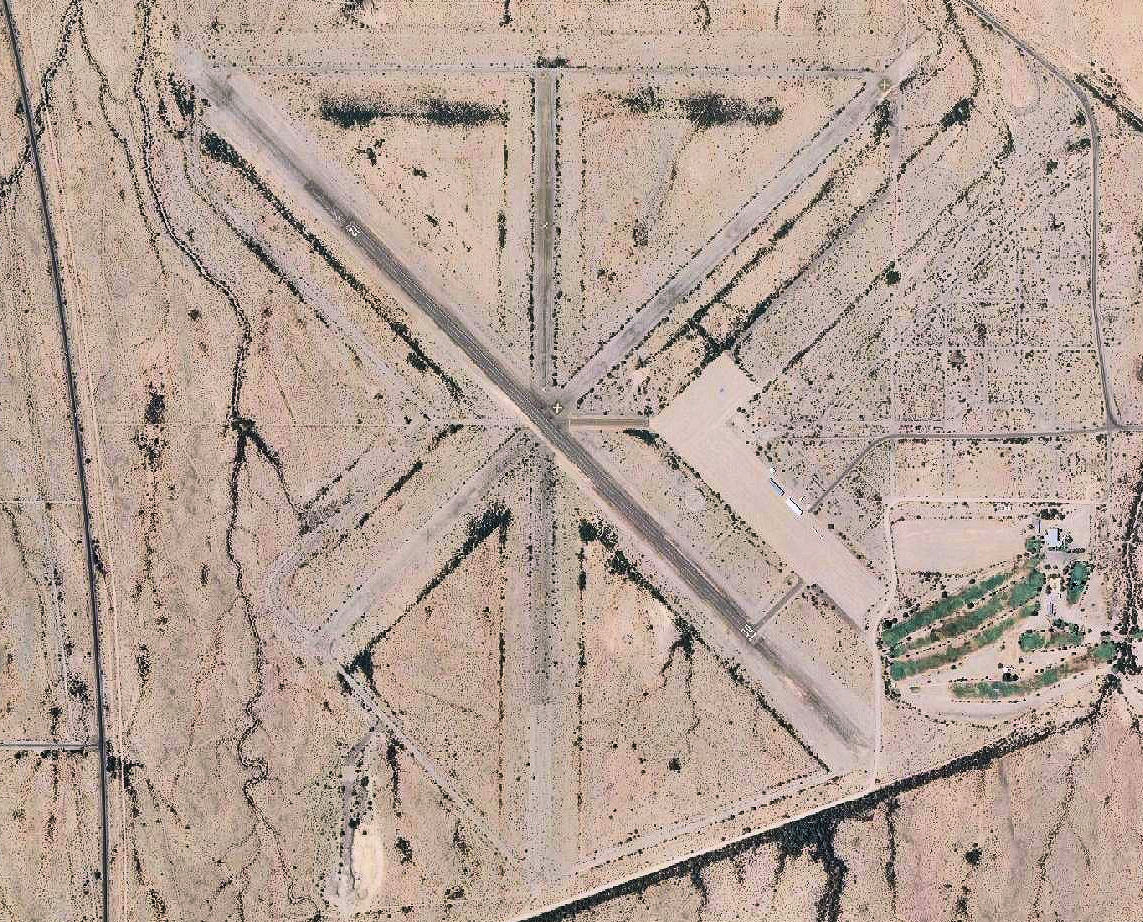
- USGS aerial image - 2006
- IATA: none; ICAO: none; FAA LID: P01

Summary
- Airport type: Public
- Owner: Pima County
- Serves: Ajo, Arizona
- Location: Pima County, Arizona
- Elevation AMSL: 1,458 ft (444 m)
- Coordinates: 32°27′10″N 112°51′41″W

Map
- Location of Eric Marcus Municipal Airport

Runways
Direction	Length		Surface
Direction	ft	m	Surface
12/30	3,800	1,158	Asphalt

Statistics (2023)
- Aircraft operations (year ending 4/19/2023): 1,600
- Source: Federal Aviation Administration

Eric Marcus Municipal Airport (FAA LID: P01) is a county-owned, public-use airport in Pima County, Arizona, United States. It is located 5.75 miles (5.00 nmi; 9.25 km) north of the central business district of Ajo and is about 82 miles (71 nmi; 132 km) southwest of Phoenix. The airport was renamed on February 11, 2006; it was formerly known as Ajo Municipal Airport.

The airport is included in the FAA's National Plan of Integrated Airport Systems for 2009–2013, which categorizes it as a general aviation facility.

== Facilities and aircraft ==
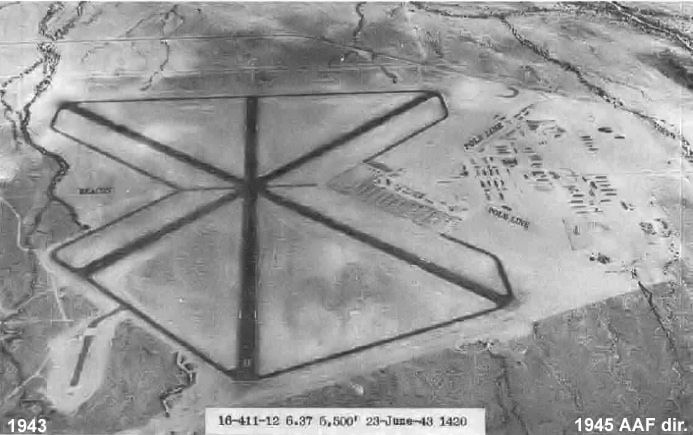
23 June 1943 airphoto of Ajo Army Airfield

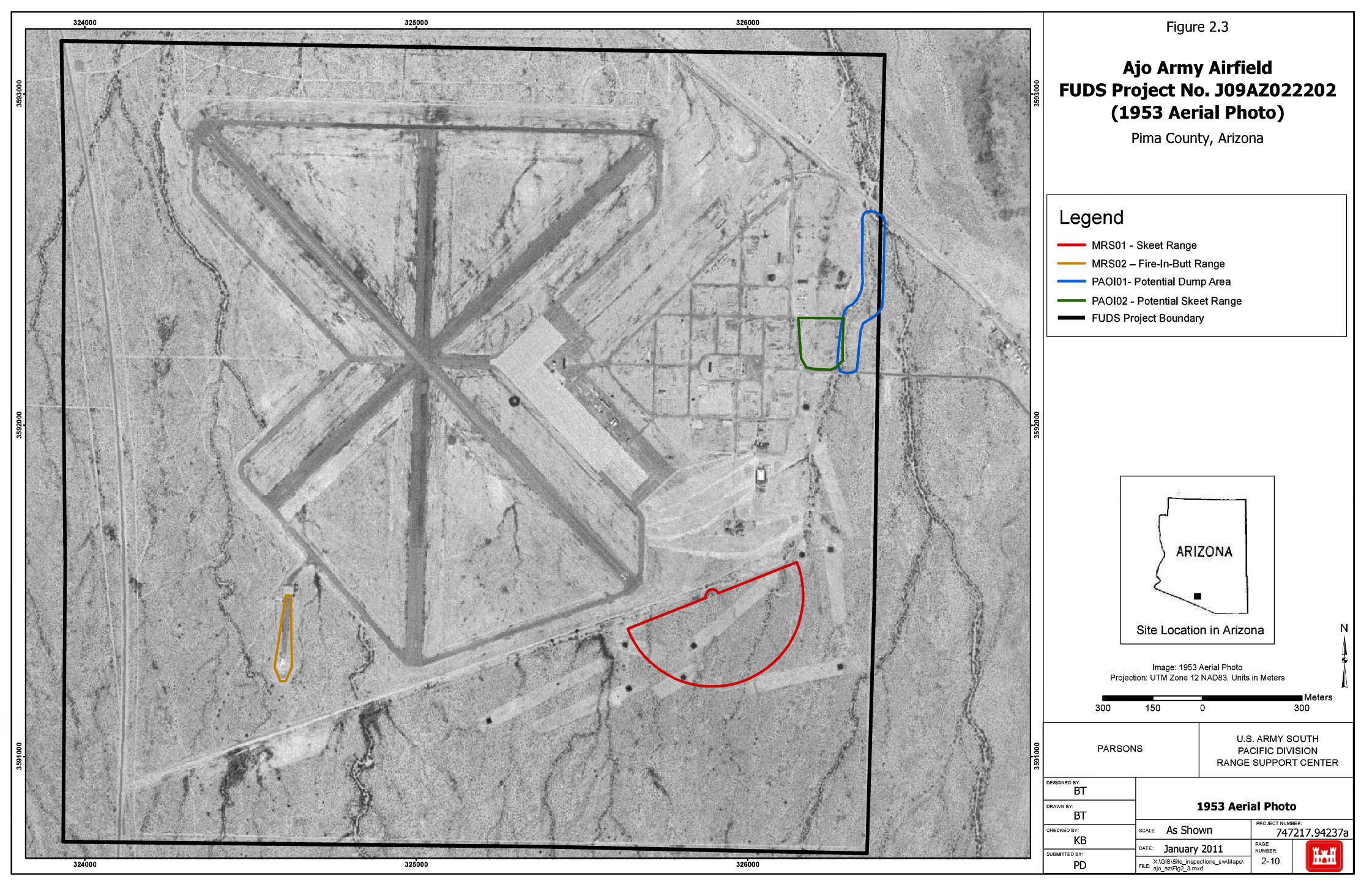
US Army COE FUDS map over 1953 airphoto

Eric Marcus Municipal Airport covers an area of 1,375 acres (556 ha) and has one runway designated 12/30 with a 3,800 x 60 ft (1,158 x 18 m) asphalt surface. For the 12-month period ending April 19, 2023, the airport had 1,600 general aviation aircraft operations, an average of 31 per week.

The Ajo Country Club is on the southeast part of the former Army Airfield containment area.

== History ==
The airport was established on 22 August 1941 on approximately 1,426 acres near Ajo, Arizona as part of the expansion of the Army Air Corps prior to the United States entry into World War II. It was designated a sub-post of Luke Army Airfield as part of the Gila Bend Gunnery Range in Maricopa County, with small detachments being stationed at the airfield. The 543d School Squadron operated from Ajo Field operating towing aircraft for aerial gunnery practice.

In June 1943, the Ajo AAF was transferred to Williams Army Air Field and the airfield was upgraded with three bituminous runways: 5350x150 (N/S), 5300x150 (NE/SW), and 6300x150 (NW/SE). A large parking apron was built with additional taxiways, landing aids and several hangars. It later became a single engine gunnery school as part of the Fixed Gunnery School operated by the 82d Flying Training Wing at Las Vegas Army Airfield, although it still supported the flying training at Luke and also Williams Army Airfield. It was under the command of the 472d (Reduced) Army Air Force Base Unit, AAF West Coast Training Center.

Ajo AAF also had three auxiliary landing fields, located out on the (now) Barry Goldwater bombing range:

- Ajo Aux #1 at 32°31′41″N 112°55′58″W
- Ajo Aux #2 at 32°36′19″N 112°52′41″W
- Ajo Aux #3 at 32°39′38″N 112°52′14″W

Although abandoned since the war, all of these fields are easily visible from the air.

With the exception of the small caliber shooting at the former fire-in-butt range, all live ammunition activities took place on the Ajo-Gila Bend Gunnery Range, well away from the Ajo AAF. A Chemical Warfare Service Detachment was assigned to the Ajo AAF; however, their activities were restricted to classroom instruction. All chemical warfare activities, other than classroom instruction, were directed through Williams Army Air Field. Ajo AAF was not authorized to receive any chemical warfare materiel

The airfield was used by the Air Force until the end of the war and was inactivated on 7 October 1946. A portion of the Ajo AAF property, approximately 51 acres, was returned to the Department of the Interior (DOI) on July 28, 1947, as part of a quitclaim. The remaining land was handed over to Pima County on August 4, 1949,

In June 1952, Bonanza Air lines started service to Los Angeles from Phoenix with a stop in Ajo.

Of the three original runways, only one is serviceable and still in use. Most of the buildings on the airfield were sold off, removed or broken up. Abandoned streets and taxiways are being eroded away by sands, tumbleweeds and time.

== See also ==
- Arizona World War II Army Airfields
- List of airports in Arizona
- 37th Flying Training Wing (World War II)
