= Coolidge Municipal Airport =

Airport in Pinal County, Arizona

Coolidge Municipal Airport Coolidge Army Airfield
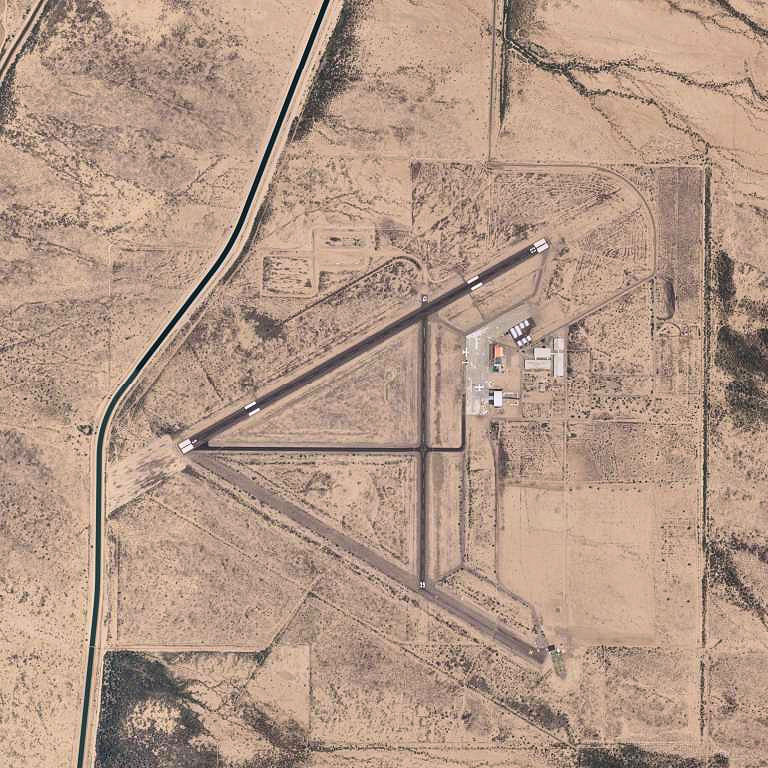
- 2006 USGS photo
- IATA: none; ICAO: none; FAA LID: P08

Summary
- Airport type: Public
- Owner: City of Coolidge
- Location: Pinal County, Arizona
- Built: 1941
- Elevation AMSL: 1,574 ft (480 m)
- Coordinates: 32°56′09″N 111°25′36″W
- Website: www.coolidgeaz.com/airport

Map
- Location of Coolidge Municipal Airport

Runways
Direction	Length		Surface
Direction	ft	m	Surface
5/23	5,528	1,685	Asphalt
17/35	3,861	1,177	Asphalt

Statistics (2020)
- Aircraft operations: 56,050
- Based aircraft: 39
- Source: Federal Aviation Administration

Coolidge Municipal Airport (FAA LID: P08) is a city-owned public airport 5 miles (4.3 nmi; 8.0 km) southeast of Coolidge, in Pinal County, Arizona, United States.

== Facilities ==
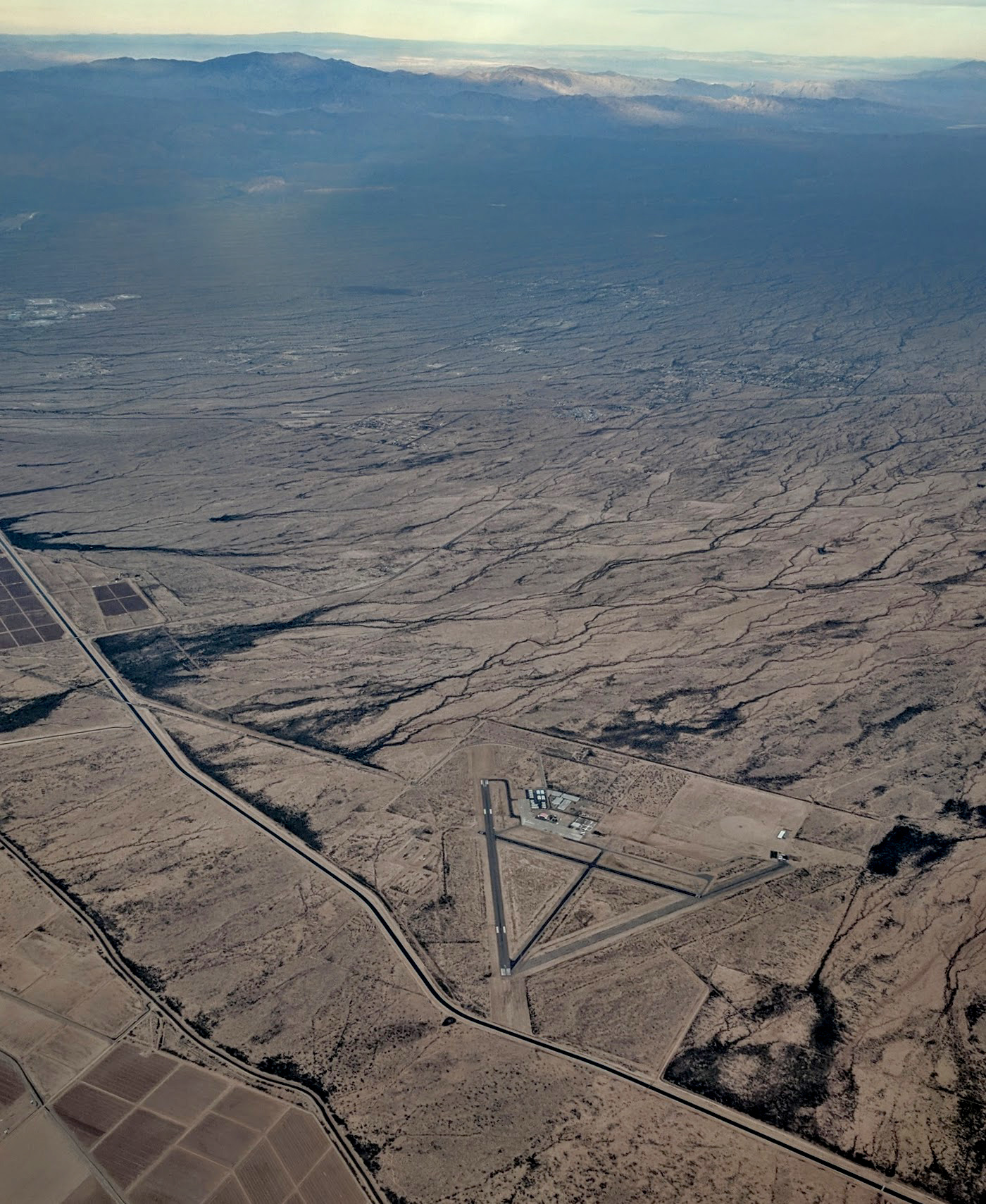
Aerial view from the southwest; the canal is part of the Central Arizona Project, taking water south to Tucson.

The airport covers 1,268 acres (513 ha) and has two asphalt runways: 5/23 is 5,528 x 150 ft (1,685 x 46 m) and 17/35 is 3,861 x 75 ft (1,177 x 23 m).

In the year ending April 2, 2020 the airport had 56,050 aircraft operations, average 153 per day: >99% general aviation and <1% military. In December 2020, 39 aircraft were then based at the airport: 24 single-engine, 10 multi-engine, 1 jet, 3 helicopter, and 1 glider.

== History ==
=== Coolidge Army Airfield ===
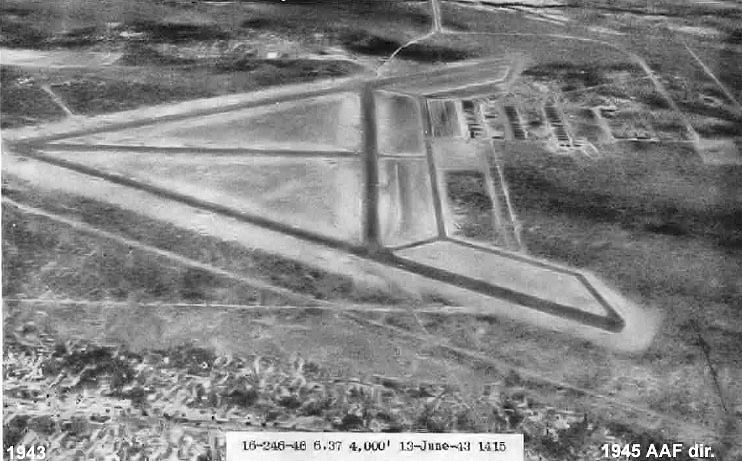
Coolidge Army Airfield, June 13, 1943

Coolidge Municipal Airport began in 1941 when the War Department began acquiring about 1,277 acres for an Army Air Corps flying training school. Property acquisition began between December 1, 1941 and May 21, 1943, when 873.85 acres were acquired from the state of Arizona in an exchange for an offer of public domain land from the Department of the Interior (DOI). Additionally, 394.33 acres were acquired by fee from three private individuals between February 3 and May 27, 1943, and easements totaling 9.31 acres were obtained from the state and two private individuals between February 19 and April 19, 1943, for the installation of an electric transmission line.

The original airfield was built with three runways in a triangle. Two remain: 17-35 and 5-23. Support facilities were built, of which a 120-foot (37 m) by 80-foot (24 m) hangar remains. 85 buildings, a sewage treatment plant, utilities and a firing range were built. Three buildings were ordnance related.

Coolidge AAF had originally been designed by the War Department as a single-engine aircraft flight training school, however, the facility initially functioned as an auxiliary field for Williams AAF as Williams Auxiliary Field No. 3.

The entire personnel of the 572nd AAF Base Unit stationed at Sky Harbor Airfield in Phoenix were moved to Coolidge AAF in May 1944. Coolidge AAF then was a ferrying service station for Air Transport Command, providing refueling and maintenance to Army, Navy, and Marine Corps planes en route to other bases, although Army Air Forces Training Command continued to use the field.

=== Coolidge Municipal Airport ===
Coolidge AAF was declared surplus on November 30, 1945, withdrawn from surplus effective March 21, 1946 by the Secretary of War, and again declared surplus effective August 28, 1946, by the Adjutant General. In 1948 the Chief of the Army Corps of Engineers attempted to transfer the site to the Air Force for use as an auxiliary field by Williams Air Force Base (located about 30 miles northwest), but there is no evidence the transfer was completed. The site was transferred to Pinal County by quitclaim deed dated January 19, 1950, and patent deeds dated March 14, 1953, and May 15, 1956. The site was then transferred to the city of Coolidge by a quitclaim deed dated March 2, 1959.

Pinal County owned and operated the airport until 1959 when the City of Coolidge obtained ownership of the airport. On March 2, 1959, the airport was officially transferred from Pinal County ownership to the City of Coolidge.

From 1962 until July 1992, operations at the airport were dominated by USAF T-37 jet training aircraft based at Williams Air Force Base. The Air Force had a lease agreement with the City of Coolidge for four parcels of land and joint use of the main runways and taxiways in return for the continued maintenance and upkeep of the main runway and taxiway. In addition, they constructed several facilities along the runway and apron to support their operations.

With Williams AFB marked for closure pursuant to BRAC action, the Air Force lease was terminated in July 1992 and USAF training operations at the airport ceased in June 1992. However, among the lessees at the Coolidge Municipal Airport is CPS, a private contractor working with the DoD to conduct parachute jump training at the airport. In addition, units from Davis-Monthan Air Force Base periodically conduct equipment drops in the area.

== See also ==
- Arizona World War II Army Airfields
- List of airports in Arizona
