= Scottsdale Airport =

Airport in Maricopa County, Arizona

Scottsdale Airport Thunderbird Field #2
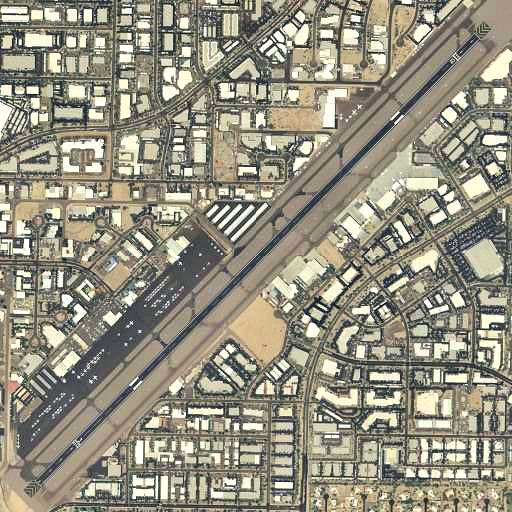
- 2006 USGS photo
- IATA: SCF; ICAO: KSDL; FAA LID: SDL

Summary
- Airport type: Public
- Owner: City of Scottsdale
- Serves: Scottsdale, Arizona
- Operating base for: JSX
- Built: March 1943
- Elevation AMSL: 1,510 ft (460 m)
- Coordinates: 33°37′22″N 111°54′38″W
- Website: www.scottsdaleaz.gov/...

Map
- Location of Scottsdale Airport SDL (the United States)

Runways
Direction	Length		Surface
Direction	ft	m	Surface
3/21	8,249	2,514	Asphalt

Statistics (2023)
- Aircraft operations: 175,826
- Based aircraft: 356
- Source: Federal Aviation Administration

Scottsdale Airport (IATA: SCF, ICAO: KSDL, FAA LID: SDL) is a municipal airport located 9 miles (7.8 nmi; 14 km) north of downtown Scottsdale, in Maricopa County, Arizona, United States. Most U.S. airports use the same three-letter location identifier for the FAA and IATA, but Scottsdale Airport is SDL to the FAA and SCF to the IATA (which assigned SDL to Midlanda Airport in Sundsvall, Sweden).

Federal Aviation Administration records say the airport had 4,798 passenger boardings (or enplanements) in calendar year 2005 and 266 enplanements in 2006. The FAA's National Plan of Integrated Airport Systems for 2007–2011 called Scottsdale a reliever airport.

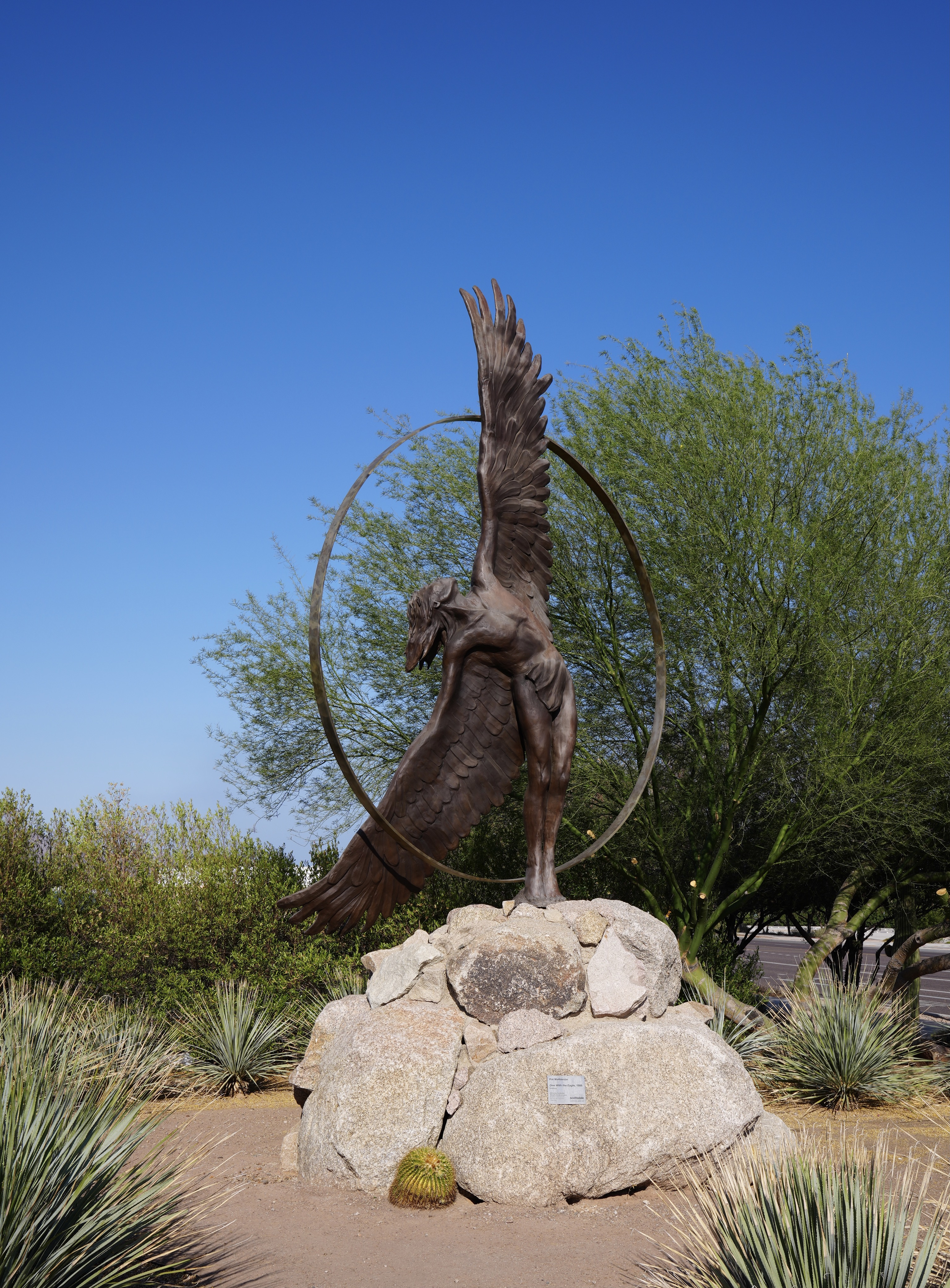
The sculpture One with the Eagle by Pat Matthiessen, 1986, at the entry to the Scottsdale Airport

It is one of the busiest single-runway general aviation airports in the nation with 186,514 operations in 2019. The airport offers clearance, ground and tower services from 1300Z to 0400Z (6 a.m. to 9 p.m. local time) daily.

U.S. Customs service is available daily from 9 a.m. to 7 p.m. This allows visitors from all over the world to come to Scottsdale with proper visas.

Neighbors' complaints about aircraft noise around the airport increased beginning in 2004, peaking in 2005 with over 15,000 complaints being logged. In 2019, complaints decreased significantly to 1,919 complaints. It is unlikely that the airport would close, due to federal grant assurances and its tremendous economic impact.

Scottsdale Airport is an important economic asset for Scottsdale and the region, contributing hundreds of millions of dollars in economic output. Aviation activity at the airport and in the surrounding airpark created $688 million in total economic benefits for the region in FY2019, with aviation activity supporting around 3,979 jobs. Economic benefits of $1.9 million are created daily.

Scottsdale airport is one of three airports that receive commercial airline flights in the Phoenix, Arizona, area, the others being Phoenix Sky Harbor International Airport and Phoenix–Mesa Gateway Airport.

== History ==
During World War II the airfield was used by the United States Army Air Forces Army Air Forces Training Command as "Thunderbird Field #2" on June 22, 1942, as a primary flight training school for aviation cadets. Since its inception, Thunderbird #2 graduated more than 5,500 students, three times the total contemplated by the AAF's original expansion program. Thunderbird #2 pilots flew nearly 26,500,000 miles, more than 3,000 times around the world at the equator. The school was deactivated on October 16, 1944.

While in operation, Thunderbird #2 underwent a transformation that took it from a small piece of isolated desert to a primary training school. This transformation is attributable to Air Force officers such as General Henry H. Arnold and Lieutenant General B.K. Yount (commander of the Army Air Forces Training Command, and the civilian contract school operated by Leland Hayward and John H. Connelly.

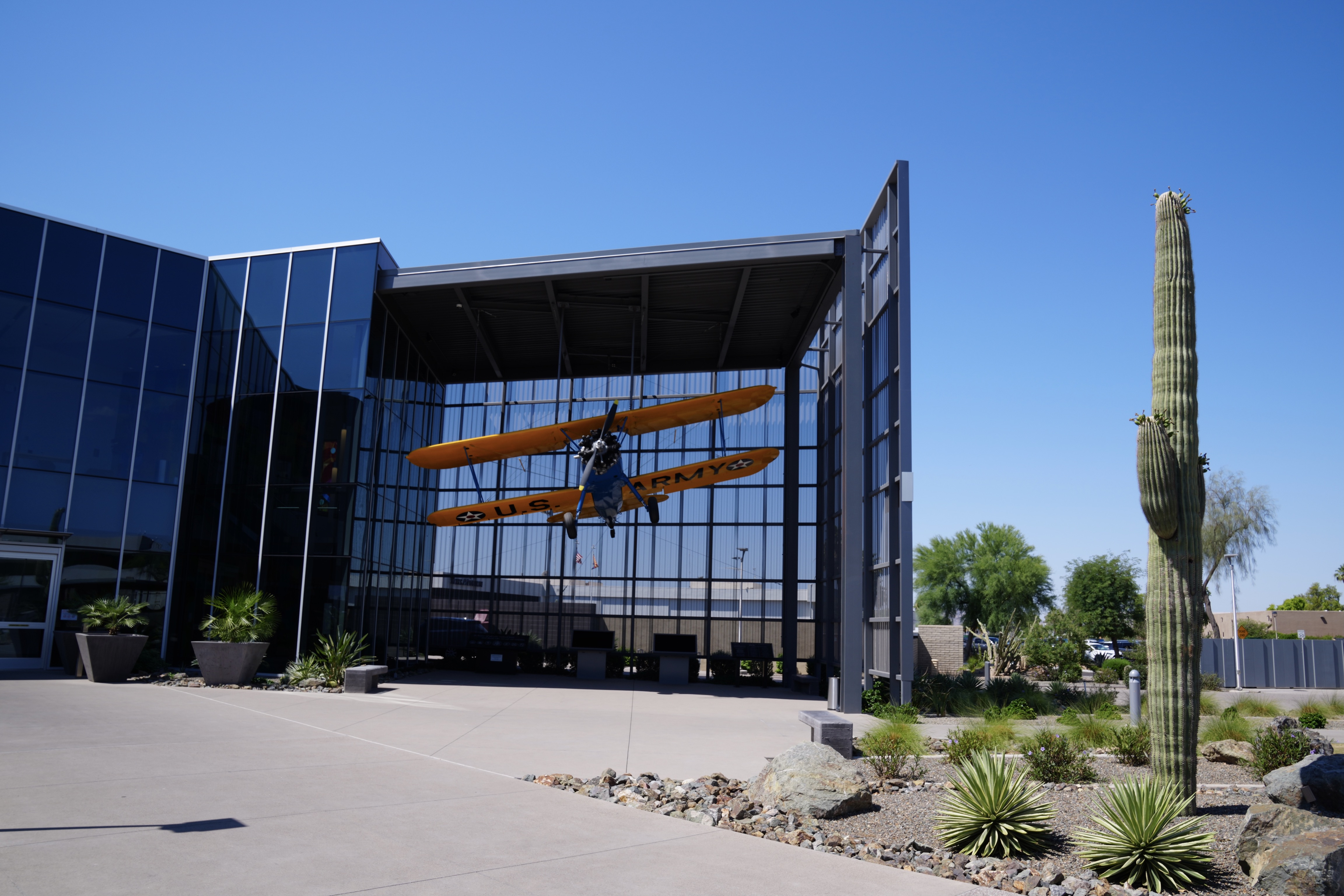
A Stearman PT-17, a historic World War II plane of the type used to train pilots in Scottsdale in World War II

One of three of Southwest Airways' training schools in the Valley, Thunderbird #2's first class of cadets, arriving before the field was pronounced ready for occupancy, had to be trained at Thunderbird Field #1 in Glendale. Not until July 22, could all personnel, consisting then of 28 flight instructors, move to Scottsdale. Throughout World War II, Thunderbird #2 devoted its every facility to the training of more and more cadets. In November 1943, the peak was reached; 615 cadets who flew an average of two hours a day, making 1,845 separate takeoffs and landings. In a period of ten weeks, students received a total of 65 hours of flight training and 109 hours of ground school. In spite of the intensified training, the field gained a widespread reputation for thoroughness of instruction and high caliber graduates.

An increase in the number of students brought about a similar gain in the number of persons employed, until in January 1944, Thunderbird II's payroll boasted 508 employees, with a total monthly salary expenditure of $115,247. Gradually the tempo slowed as World War II came to an end. So well did civilian contractors complete their initial assignment, that by August 4, 1944, only 40 of the original 64 primary schools were still in operation. At the closing of Thunderbird #2, only 15 remained opened to complete the task of primary training.

After the war, Arizona State Teachers College (now Arizona State University in Tempe, Arizona), acquired the airport in order to implement its own aviation program. Distance from the college campus and cost of operating an aviation program soon convinced the college to abandon its plans. By 1951, enrollment had decreased to such an extent that Arizona State decided to end its aviation program on June 15, 1951.

The Arizona Conference of Seventh-day Adventists bought the airport in 1953, and founded Thunderbird Academy. The President of the Arizona Conference influential in the purchase was George (G.H.) Rustad - President from 1950-1959. In 1966, the City of Scottsdale bought the airfield portion of the academy's property from the Seventh-day Adventist Church for $750,000. The funds was provided to the City by Landel Inc., a company that was planning on developing industrial sites around the airport. The City continues to own and operate the airport.

The airport briefly saw commercial airline service from mid-1989 through early 1990 by StatesWest Airlines, a commuter airline which provided turboprop flights to Orange County, California and Bullhead City, Arizona/Laughlin, Nevada.

On December 14, 2023, JSX announced they would move their Phoenix Sky Harbor operations to Scottsdale Airport from January 10, 2024 with service to Burbank, Denver–Rocky Mountain, Las Vegas. The airport forbids typical airline service operating under FAR Part 121 but JSX operates under Part 135.

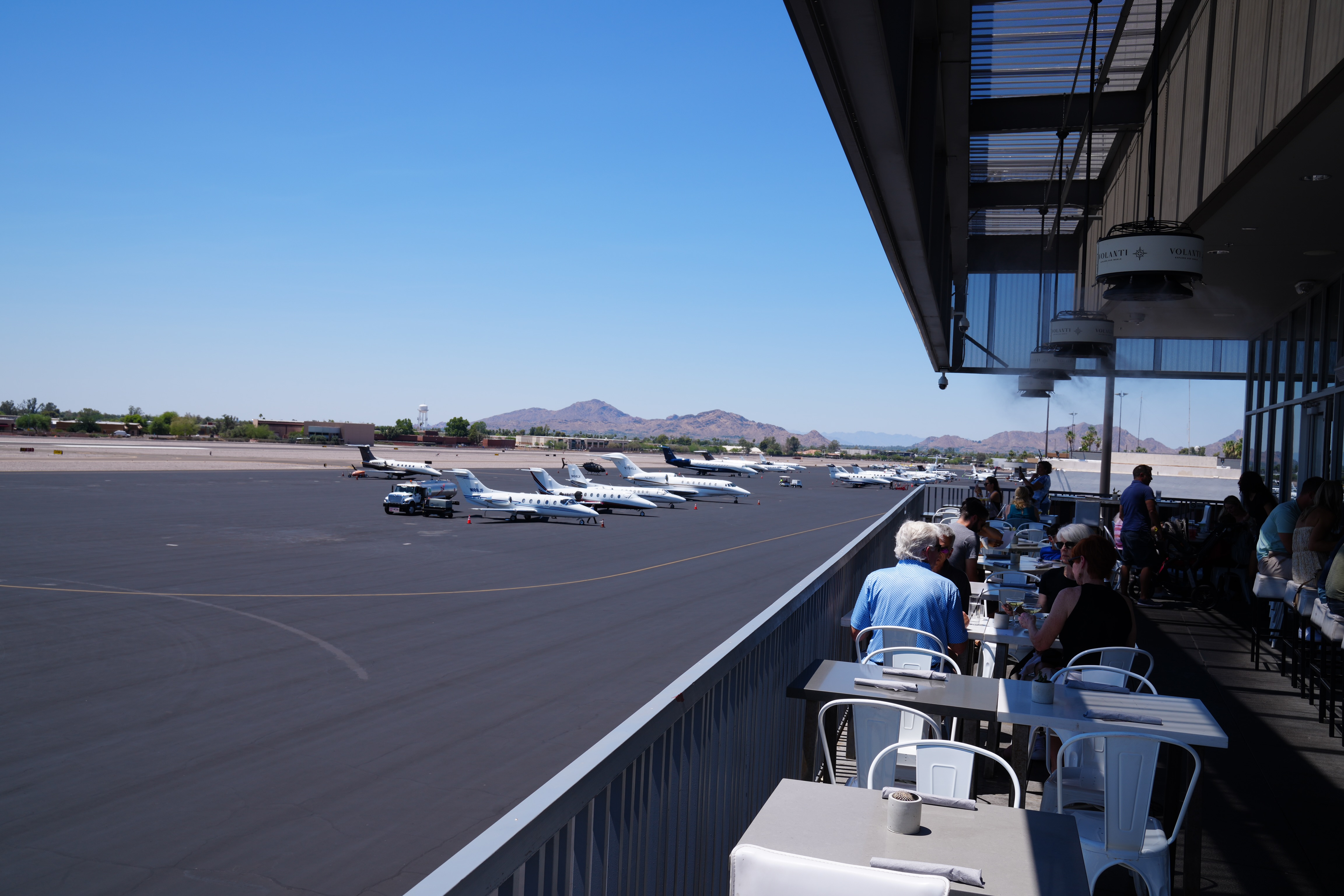
The Volanti Restaurant at the Scottsdale Airport overlooks the airport's runway and taxi way. Camelback Mountain is in the background.

== Facilities ==
Scottsdale Airport covers 282 acres (114 ha) and has one asphalt runway (3/21), 8,249 x 100 ft (2,514 x 30 m).

In the year ending December 31, 2020, the airport had 202,564 aircraft operations, average 555 per day: 91% general aviation, 8% air taxi and less than 1% military. 356 aircraft were based at this airport: 167 single engine, 26 multi-engine, 137 jet and 26 helicopters. In 2019, the airport had 186,514 aircraft operations. There were more than 200,000 operations in 2020.

There are three main fixed-base operators located on the field, Jet Aviation, Signature Aviation (formerly Signature Flight Support), and Atlantic Aviation (formerly Ross Aviation). The Scottsdale Fire Department maintains a facility next to the tower. Scottsdale Airport is also home to Civil Air Patrol Squadrons 314 and 310, assisting in field missions upon request.

== Airlines and destinations ==
=== Passenger ===
The following airlines operate regularly scheduled passenger flights at Scottsdale Airport:

Airlines	Destinations	Refs
JSX	Burbank, Cabo San Lucas, Denver–Centennial, Las Vegas, Orange County, San Diego/Carlsbad, Santa Monica; Seasonal: Dallas–Love, Salt Lake City	

== Accidents and incidents ==
- On February 10, 2025, a privately owned Learjet 35A veered off the runway while landing at the airport and crashed into a parked business jet, resulting in the death of one person and injuries to four others. The plane was owned by Mötley Crüe singer Vince Neil, who was not onboard the jet at the time of the crash. According to initial reports, one of the two main landing gears failed on the aircraft during the landing, resulting in the loss of control. It was the first fatal accident at the airport since 2018.
- On April 21, 2025, a Beechcraft Premier I overran the runway after landing on runway 21. The two occupants survived.

== See also ==
- Arizona World War II Army Airfields
- List of airports in Arizona
- 37th Flying Training Wing (World War II)
