= El Tiro Gliderport =

Gliderport in Pima County, Arizona

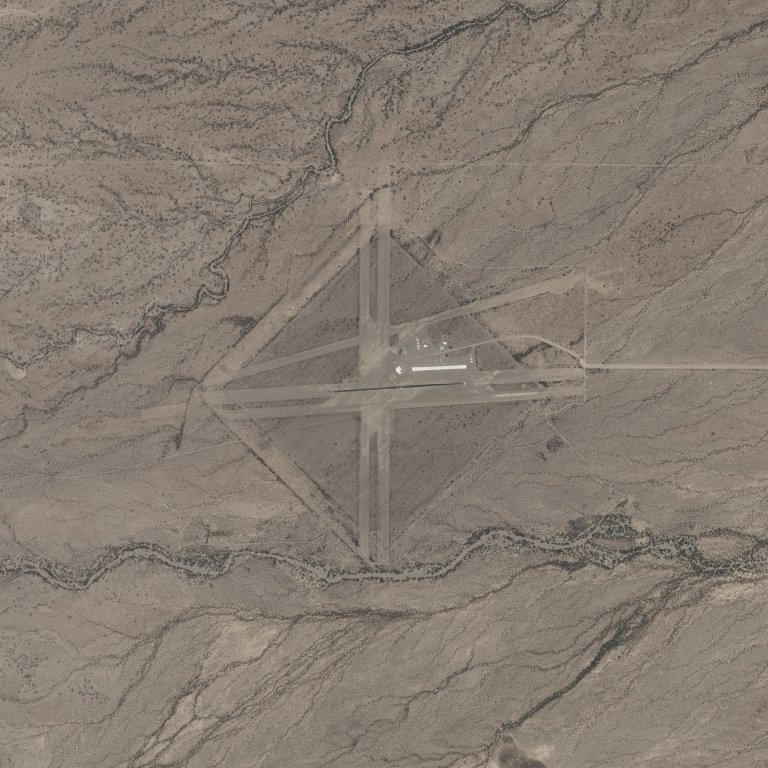
- IATA: none; ICAO: none; FAA LID: AZ67

Summary
- Airport type: Private use; permission required prior to landing
- Operator: Tucson Soaring Club, Inc.
- Location: Pima County, Arizona
- Elevation AMSL: 2,100 ft (640 m)
- Coordinates: 32°25′37.25″N 111°23′22.39″W
- Website: http://tucsonsoaring.org/

Map
- Location of airport in Arizona AZ67 (the United States)

Runways
Direction	Length		Surface
Direction	ft	m	Surface
8L/26R	1,300	397	Asphalt
8/26	5,120	1,561	Dirt
8R/26L	5,000	1,524	Dirt
17L/35R	5,000	1,524	Dirt/treated
17R/35L	5,000	1,524	Dirt/treated

El Tiro Gliderport (FAA LID: AZ67), formerly Marana Auxiliary Army Airfield No. 5 (Sahuaro Field), is marked on the Phoenix sectional chart is a non-towered private use gliderport 23 mi (20 nmi; 37 km) northwest of Tucson, Arizona, United States. The airport property is leased from the Bureau of Land Management and has been operated by the Tucson Soaring Club, Inc. (a chapter of the Soaring Society of America) since 1983.

Marana Auxiliary Army Airfield No. 5 (aka Sahuaro Field) was one of five auxiliary fields that served Marana Army Air Field (now Pinal Airpark) and is one of many Arizona World War II Army Airfields. Sahuaro Field first appeared on the Phoenix sectional chart in 1945. The airfield was originally described as a "206 acres (83 ha) square-shaped property having a 3,000 ft (910 m) square asphalt landing mat." After World War II there is evidence of the airfield being used by the United States Air Force in 1957 for pilot training in North American T-6 Texan and T-28 Trojan aircraft. From 1958 the airport was reportedly abandoned until Tucson Soaring Club leased the property.

== Facilities ==
- 8L/26R measuring 5,000 ft × 100 ft (1,524 m × 30 m), dirt
- 8L/26R measuring 1,300 ft × 22 ft (396.2 m × 6.7 m), asphalt, superimposed on 8L/26R
- 8/26 measuring 5,120 ft × 100 ft (1,561 m × 30 m), dirt center
- 8R/26L measuring 5,000 ft × 100 ft (1,524 m × 30 m), dirt
- 17L/35R measuring 5,000 ft × 100 ft (1,524 m × 30 m), dirt/treated
- 17R/35L measuring 5,000 ft × 100 ft (1,524 m × 30 m), dirt/treated

=== Old runways ===
- 4L/23R 3,300 ft × 280 ft (1,006 m × 85 m), asphalt
- 4R/23L 3,300 ft × 280 ft (1,006 m × 85 m), asphalt
- 13L/32R 3,300 ft × 280 ft (1,006 m × 85 m), asphalt
- 13R/32R 3,300 ft × 280 ft (1,006 m × 85 m), asphalt

== Gallery ==
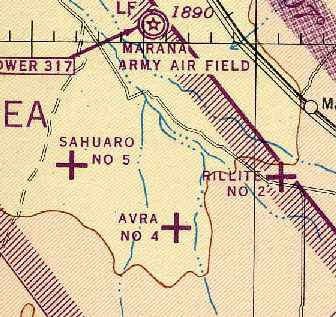
1945 Phoenix sectional chart shows El Tiro Gliderport as Marana Auxiliary Army Airfield No. 5 (aka Sahuaro Field).

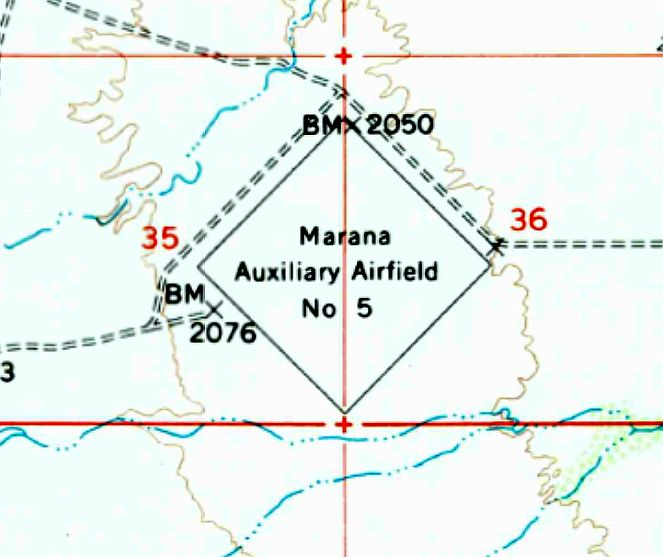
1957 USGS topo map of Marana Auxiliary Airfield No 5

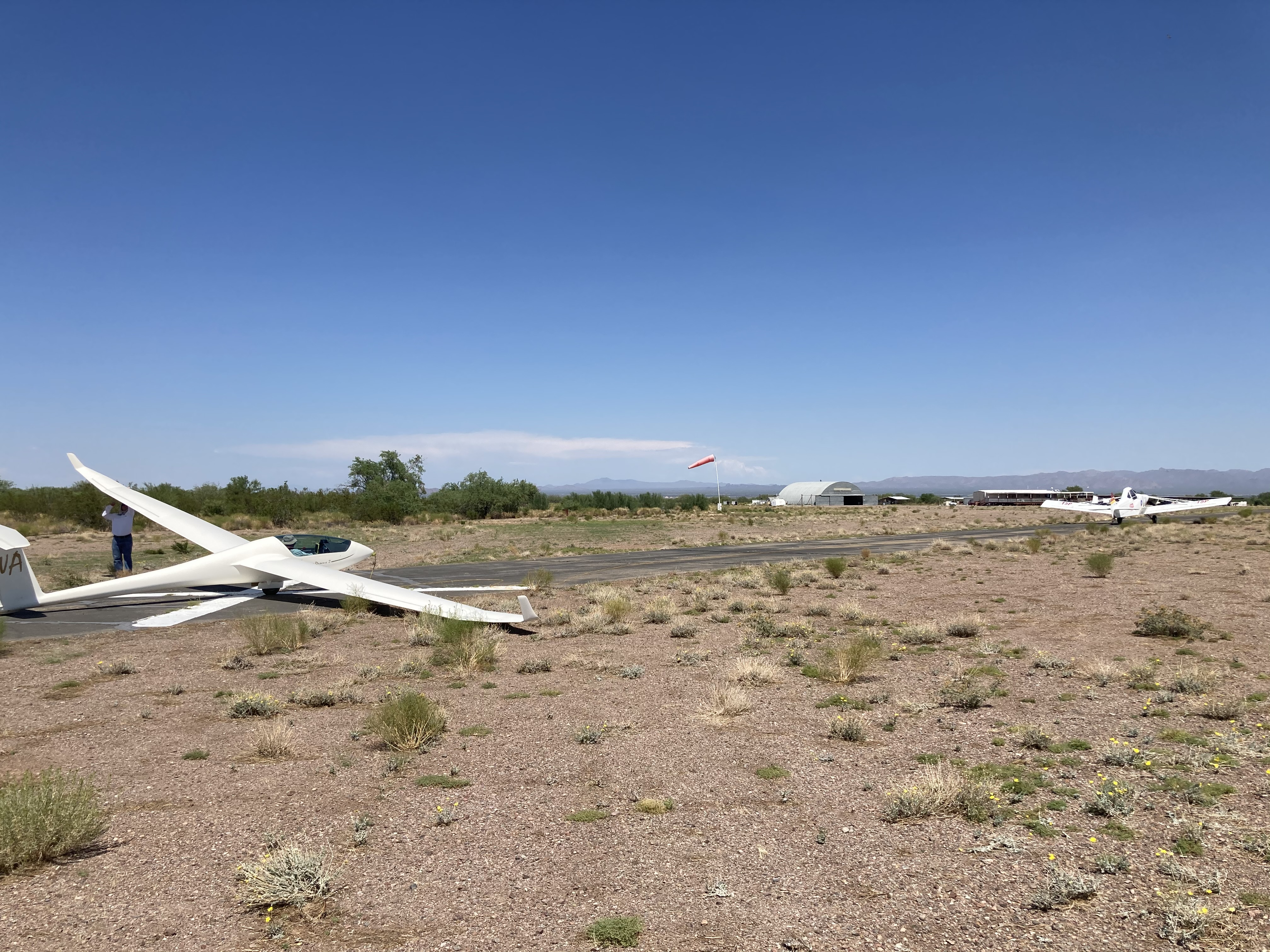
Schempp-Hirth Discus-2 glider preparing to launch in tow by a Piper PA-25 Pawnee tow plane at El Tiro in 2020

== See also ==
- Pinal Airpark
- Arizona World War II Army Airfields
- List of airports in Arizona
