= Rolle Airfield =

Public use non-towered airport in Arizona

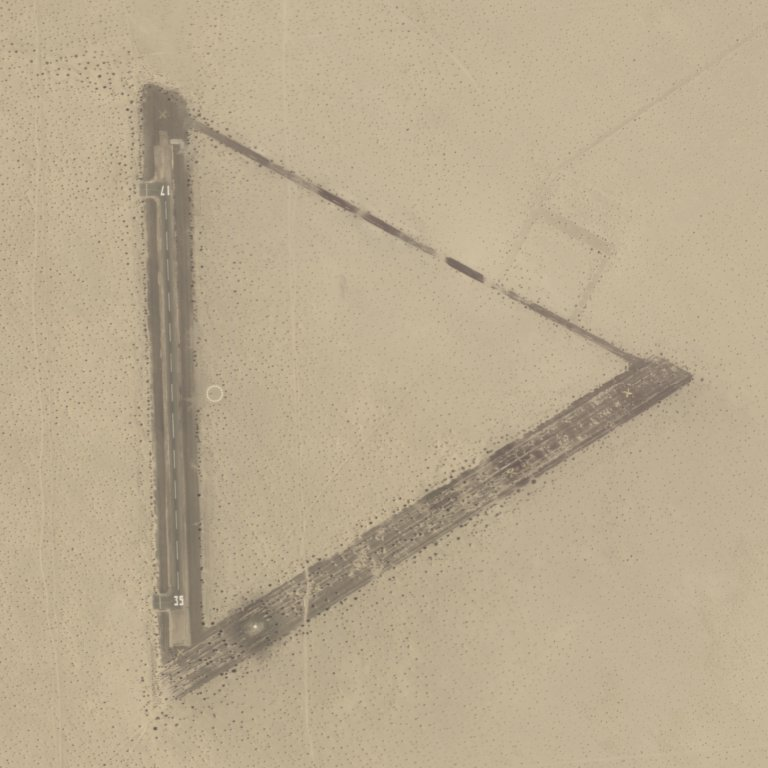
- IATA: none; ICAO: none; FAA LID: 44A

Summary
- Airport type: Public
- Owner: US Dept of the Interior
- Operator: Yuma County Airport Authority
- Serves: Yuma, Arizona
- Location: San Luis, Arizona
- Built: 1942
- Elevation AMSL: 163 ft / 50 m
- Coordinates: 32°30′52″N 114°41′54″W
- Website: RolleField.com

Map

Runways
Direction	Length		Surface
Direction	ft	m	Surface
17/35	2,800	853	Asphalt

Statistics (2016)
- Aircraft operations: 3,100
- Based aircraft: none
- Source: FAA; GNIS

Rolle Airfield (FAA LID: 44A), also known as Rolle Field, formally Yuma Auxiliary Army Airfield No. 4, is a public use non-towered airport owned by United States Department of the Interior, and managed by the Yuma County Airport Authority. The airport is located in San Luis, Arizona, 14 miles (12 nmi; 23 km) south of the central business district of Yuma, a city in Yuma County, Arizona, United States. It is 146 miles (127 nmi; 235 km) east of San Diego International Airport. The airport is 3.5 miles (3.0 nmi; 5.6 km) north of the Mexico–United States border.

Although most U.S. airports use the same three-letter location identifier for the FAA, IATA, and ICAO, Rolle Airfield is only assigned 44A by the FAA.

== History ==
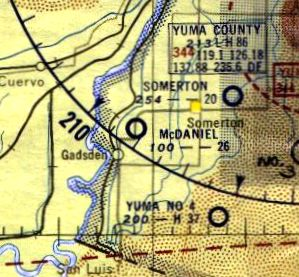
1995 Phoenix sectional chart depicting Yuma Aux AAF No. 4

In 1942 Yuma Auxiliary Army Airfield No. 4 (aka Rolle Field) was one of seven satellite auxiliary airfields for Yuma Army Air Field (now: Marine Corps Air Station Yuma) and is one of many Arizona World War II Army Airfields. The United States Army Air Forces trained bomber crews at Rolle through the end of World War II. The airport was declared surplus in 1945 and relinquished to the Department of the Interior in 1947. Through the 1950s, 60s, and 70s the airport was used primarily by agricultural farmers and growers for conducting crop dusting operations for the surrounding areas. In 1972 improvements were made to runway 17/35 to what we see today. Additional improvements were completed in 2011 to the airport including reconstruction of 17/35 runway, construction of new taxiway and aircraft parking apron, construction of runway end run-outs, a new parking lot, sidewalk, hangar, septic system, water well, electrical generator, perimeter fence, access vehicle gate and pedestrian gate. With these improvements the Airport Authority hopes to attract an increase in traffic from general aviation as well as companies that specialise in unmanned aerial systems.

In 2009 Yuma County Airport Authority renewed the lease on the airport for 25 years.

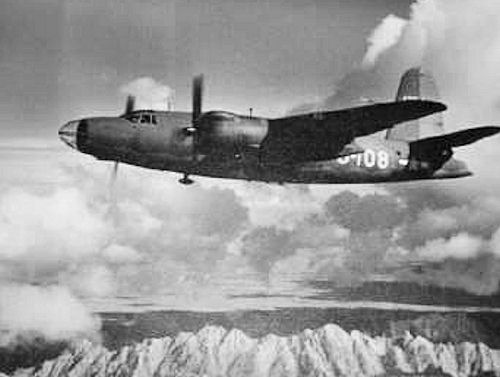
B-26 Marauder from Yuma Army Air Base, 1944

== Facilities and aircraft ==
Rolle Airfield covers an area of 640 acres (260 ha) at an elevation of 163 ft (50 m) above mean sea level. It has one runway:

- 17/35 measuring 2,800 ft × 60 ft (853 m × 18 m) asphalt

For the 12-month period ending February 11, 2016, the airport had 3,100 aircraft operations, an average of 8.5 per day: 97% general aviation, and 3% military. At that time there were no aircraft based at this airport.

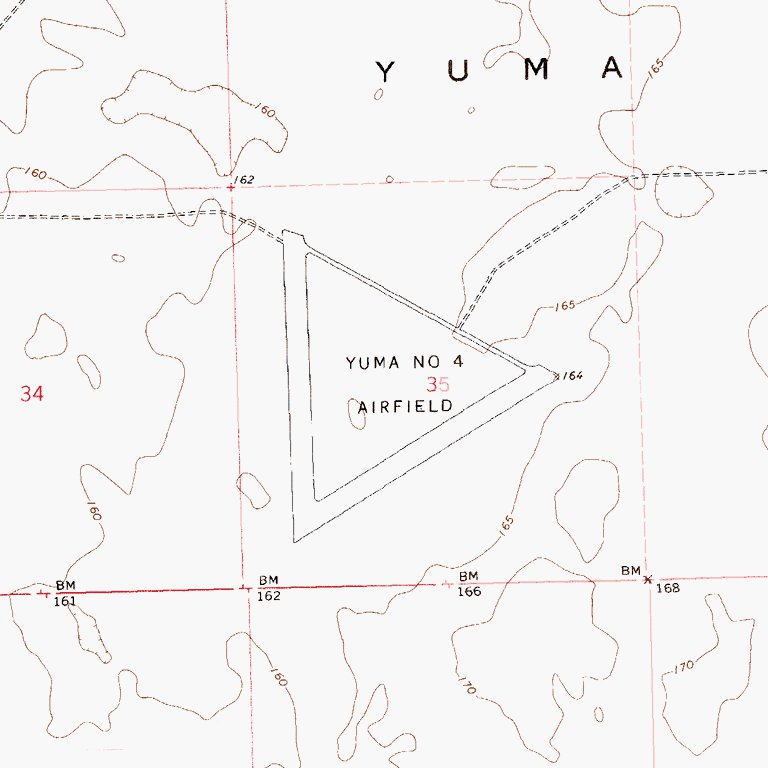
1965 USGS topo map depicted Yuma Aux AAF No. 4 as having two paved runways connected by a paved taxiway.

== See also ==
- Yuma International Airport
- Arizona World War II Army Airfields
- List of airports in Arizona
