= Rittenhouse Army Heliport =

Heliport in Pinal County, Arizona

Rittenhouse Army Heliport Williams Field Auxiliary No. 2
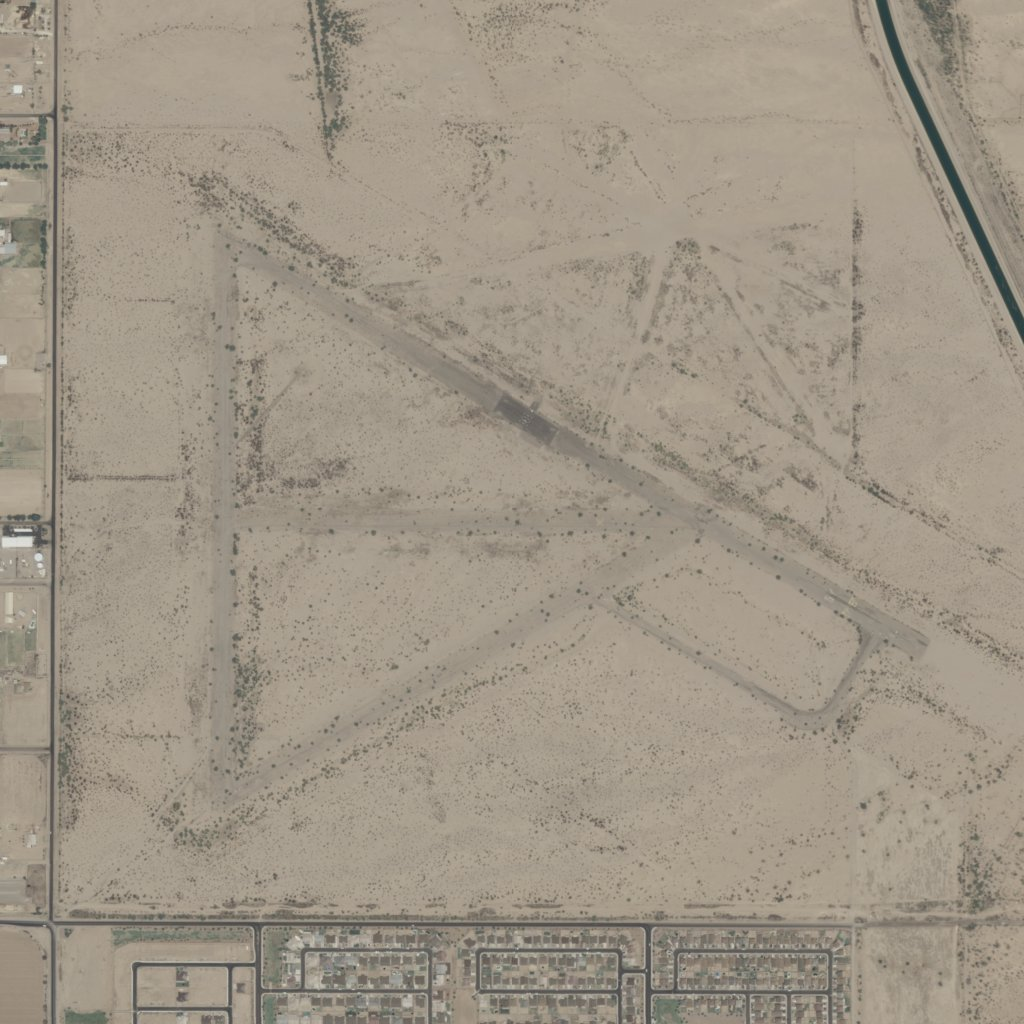
- IATA: none; ICAO: none; FAA LID: AZ38

Summary
- Airport type: Military
- Owner: United States Army
- Operator: Arizona Army National Guard
- Location: Queen Creek, Arizona
- Elevation AMSL: 1,550 ft / 472 m
- Coordinates: 33°15′05″N 111°31′05″W

Map

Runways
Direction	Length		Surface
Direction	ft	m	Surface
12/30	1,500	457	Asphalt

Statistics
- Aircraft operations: no data
- Based aircraft: none
- Source: Federal Aviation Administration

Rittenhouse Army Heliport (FAA LID: AZ38) formally Williams Field Auxiliary No. 2 is an Arizona Army National Guard training airstrip 11.5 miles (10.0 nmi; 18.5 km) east of the central business district of Queen Creek, a city in Pinal County, Arizona, United States and 31 miles (27 nmi; 50 km) southeast of Phoenix Sky Harbor International Airport.

Although most U.S. airports use the same three-letter location identifier for the FAA, IATA, and ICAO, this airport is only assigned AZ38 by the FAA.

Williams Field Auxiliary No. 2 was one of many auxiliary fields that served Williams Field (now Phoenix-Mesa Gateway Airport) and is one of many Arizona World War II Army Airfields.

== Facilities and aircraft ==
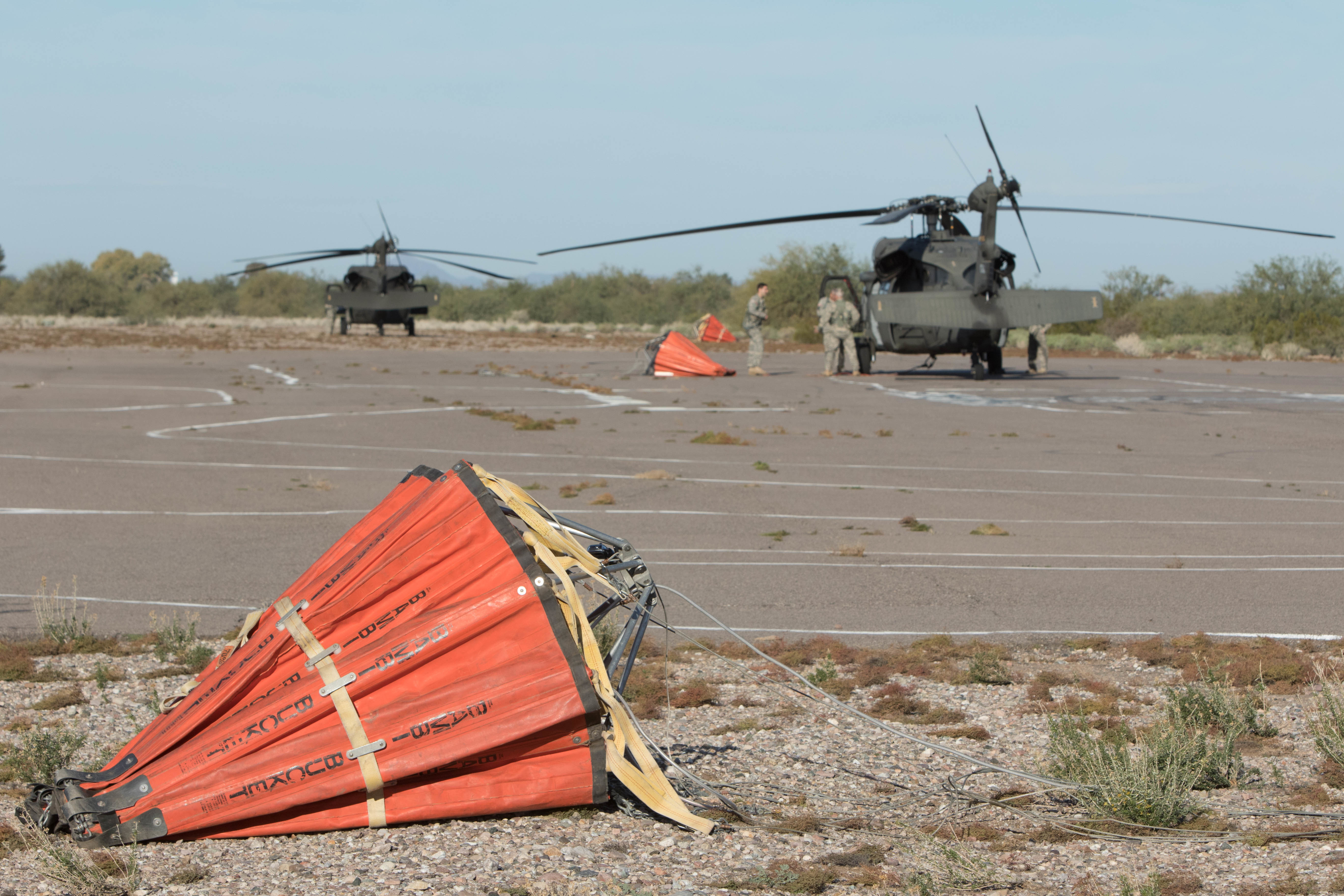
Arizona Guard trains to fight wildland fires.

Rittenhouse Army Heliport is at an elevation of 1,550 ft (470 m) above mean sea level. It has one asphalt runway:

- 12/30 measuring 1,500 ft × 50 ft (457 m × 15 m)

No aircraft are based at this airfield.
