= Ryan Airfield =

Airport in Tucson, Arizona

Ryan Airfield (former Ryan Army Airfield)

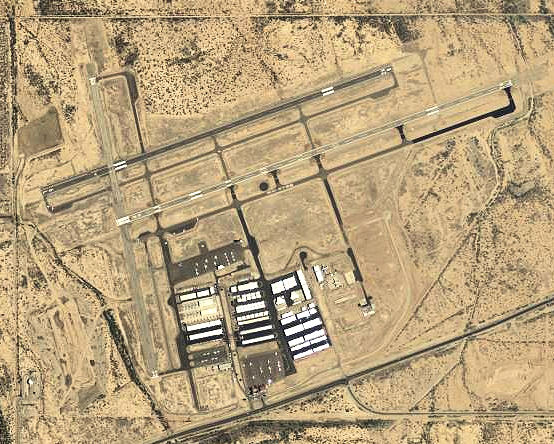
- USGS 2006 orthophoto
- IATA: none; ICAO: KRYN; FAA LID: RYN

Summary
- Airport type: Public
- Owner: City of Tucson
- Operator: Tucson Airport Authority
- Serves: Tucson, Arizona
- Location: Pima County, Arizona
- Elevation AMSL: 2,419 ft / 737 m
- Coordinates: 32°08′32″N 111°10′28″W
- Website: FlyTucsonAirport.com/Ryan

Map
- Location of airport in Arizona RYN (the United States)

Runways
Direction	Length		Surface
Direction	ft	m	Surface
6R/24L	5,500	1,676	Asphalt
6L/24R	4,900	1,494	Asphalt
15/33	4,010	1,222	Asphalt

Statistics (2022)
- Aircraft operations: 107,947
- Based aircraft: 224
- Sources: Airport website, FAA

Ryan Airfield (ICAO: KRYN, FAA LID: RYN), also known as Ryan Field, is a city-owned, public-use airport located 12 miles (10 nmi; 19 km) southwest of the central business district of Tucson, a city in Pima County, Arizona, United States. It is included in the National Plan of Integrated Airport Systems for 2011–2015, which categorized it as a reliever airport. It is mostly used for general aviation but also serves a significant amount of law enforcement and military helicopter activity. Approximately 50% of Ryan's traffic is training-related.

Although most U.S. airports use the same three-letter location identifier for the FAA and IATA, this airport is assigned RYN by the FAA but has no designation from the IATA (which assigned RYN to Royan - Médis Airport in Royan, France). The airport's ICAO identifier is KRYN.

== History ==
After the surprise attack by the Japanese on Pearl Harbor, Hawaii, in December 1941, the military decided that an inland training location was preferred, to the current Ryan School of Aeronautics in San Diego, California, founded by aviation pioneer T. Claude Ryan and Tucson was chosen as the site.

Ground was broken in June 1942 for the new Ryan School of Aeronautics of Arizona under the direction of the U.S. Army Air Forces, located about 15 miles southwest of Tucson, along the Ajo Highway. By August 1942, the institution with its half-completed buildings and roofless offices, was training aviators in the Ryan P-22 aircraft, which functioned surprisingly well in the heat, wind and dust storms, although crashes did occur at the school, at times, leading to death in certain incidents.

By July 1943, when T. Claude Ryan, the president of the school, returned the following year, Ryan Airfield had been completed. By this time the airfield had electricity, plumbing and air conditioning. The ground was covered with asphalt to hold the desert dust. It also had barracks and a PX.

Military flight training at Ryan ceased in 1944 and the property was conveyed to the State of Arizona in 1948. Currently owned by the City of Tucson, Ryan is operated by the Tucson Airport Authority under an agreement which expires in 2054.

An air traffic control tower was constructed at Ryan in 1993. The airport was added to the Contract Tower Program in 1996. In September 2004, the tower staff completed the one millionth operation without an error. In May 2010, the tower staff achieved two million operations without an error.

Significant infrastructure improvements and major maintenance projects are accomplished continuously, as is private and commercial hangar construction.

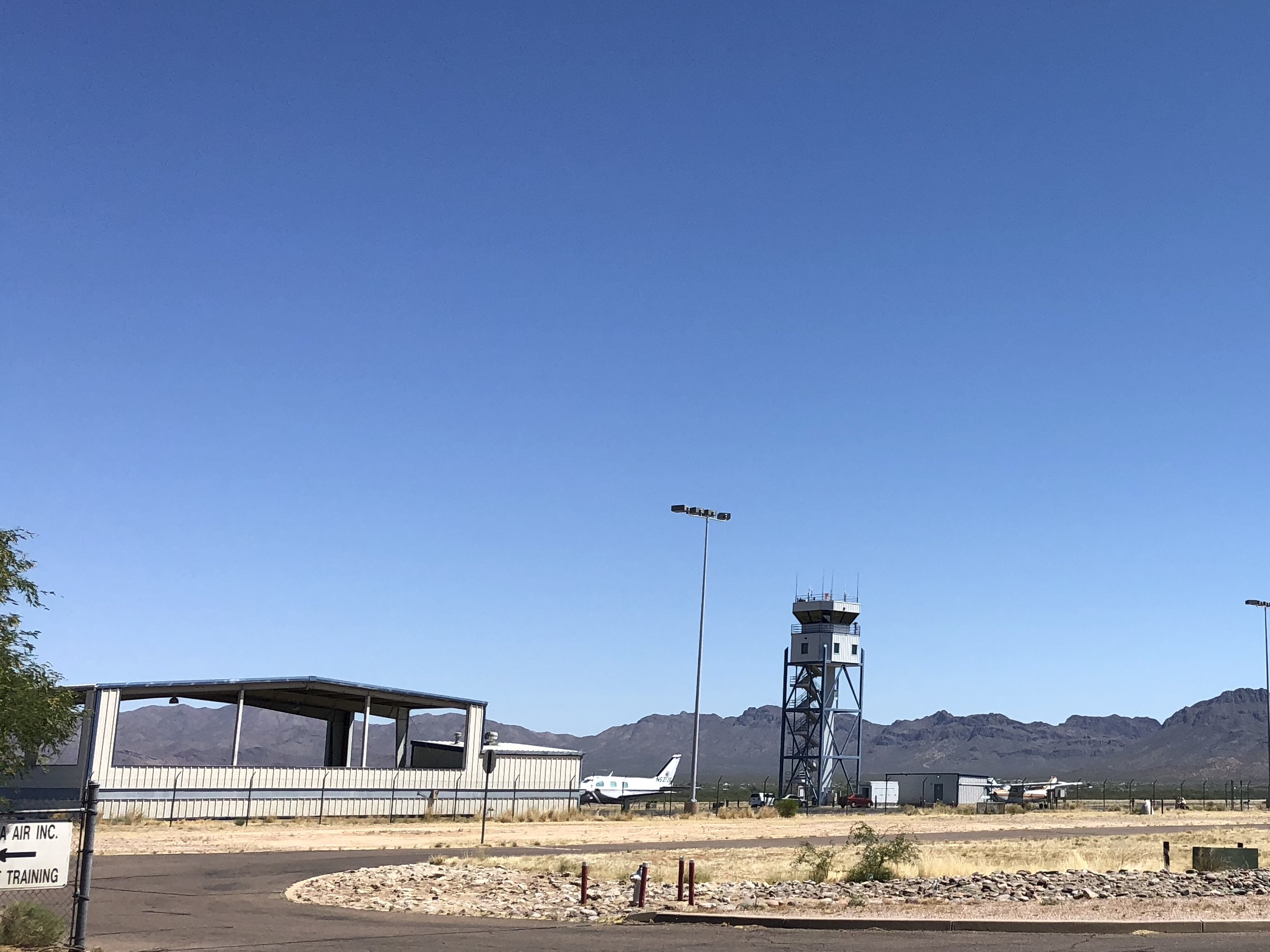
View of the tower and ramp at Ryan Airfield

== Facilities and aircraft ==
Ryan Field covers an area of 1,754 acres (710 ha) at an elevation of 2,419 feet (737 m) above mean sea level. It has three runways with asphalt surfaces:

- 6R/24L is 5,500 ft × 75 ft (1,676 m × 23 m).
- 6L/24R is 4,900 ft × 75 ft (1,494 m × 23 m).
- 15/33 is 4,010 ft × 75 ft (1,222 m × 23 m).

Only runway 6R is serviced by an instrument approach. It allows pilots to land with ceilings as low as 250 feet above ground level. Runways 6L and 6R are the preferential runways, and they are used with tailwinds up to 10 knots.

For the 12-month period ending December 31, 2022, the airport had 107,947 aircraft operations, an average of 296 per day: 95% general aviation, 5% military, and <1% air taxi. At that time there were 224 aircraft based at this airport: 203 single-engine, 17 multi-engine, 2 jet, 1 helicopter, and 1 ultralight.

== See also ==
- Arizona World War II Army Airfields
- 37th Flying Training Wing (World War II)
- List of airports in Arizona

== Other sources ==
- Manning, Thomas A. (2005), History of Air Education and Training Command, 1942–2002. Office of History and Research, Headquarters, AETC, Randolph AFB, Texas OCLC 71006954, 29991467
- Shaw, Frederick J. (2004), Locating Air Force Base Sites, History’s Legacy, Air Force History and Museums Program, United States Air Force, Washington DC. OCLC 57007862, 1050653629
