= Hereford Army Airfield =

Former military airfield in Cochise County, Arizona

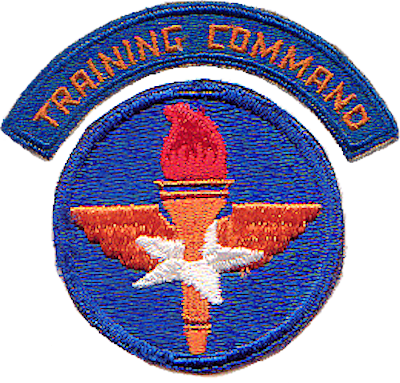
Hereford Army Airfield
- Part of Army Air Force Training Command
- Cochise County, about 2 miles (3.2 km) west-southwest of Hereford, Arizona
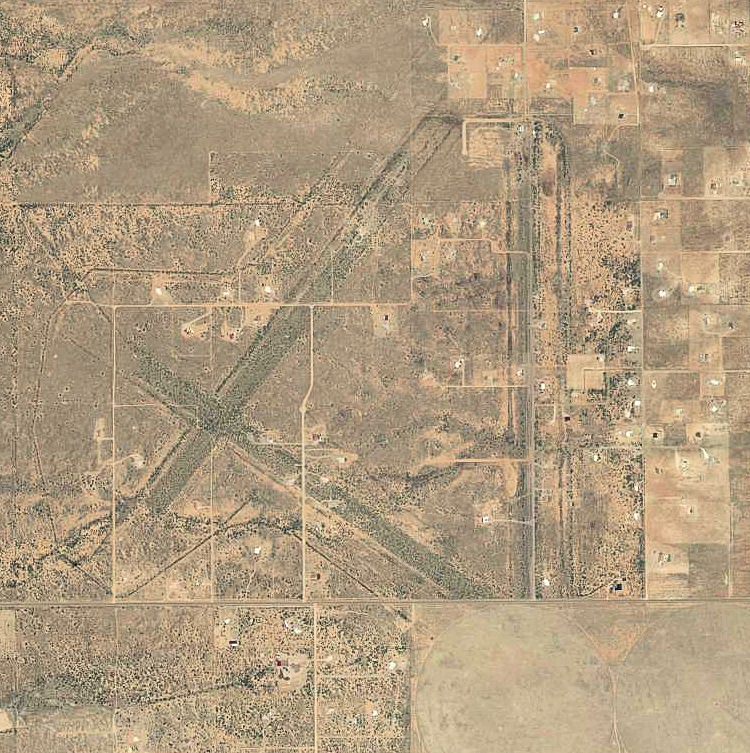
- 2006 USGS orthophoto

Site information
- Type: USAAF training airfield
- Controlled by: United States Army Air Forces

Location
- Coordinates: 31°25′01″N 110°08′27″W

Site history
- Built: 1942
- In use: 1942–1945

Garrison information
- Garrison: Fourth Air Force

Hereford Army Airfield is an abandoned military airfield located about 2 miles (1.7 nmi; 3.2 km) west-southwest of Hereford, Arizona, United States.

== Military use ==
The airfield was acquired by the War Department in August 1942 for use as an auxiliary air field for Douglas Army Airfield. A total of 2,598 acres (10.51 km^{2}) were acquired by the War Department. Improvements included the addition of three bituminous taxiways, a concrete parking apron, 38 buildings, and 18 miscellaneous structures. Four ordnance-related structures were also identified, as well as two ammunition storage facilities. The Hereford AAF had housing capacity for 598 troops. According to the 2011 Archive Research Site Summary, historic construction maps of the airfield depict a skeet range southeast of the runways. It is unknown whether the skeet range was ever constructed.

Due to its mission of training bomber crews, the longest runway at Hereford was 9,200' long, significantly larger than the typical runway of a World War II-era training field.

The airfield offered specialized night training in North American B-25 Mitchell and Martin B-26 Marauder medium bombers. Historical documents also indicate that UC-78 aircraft were also flown out of Hereford AAF.

== Civil use ==
Hereford AAF was declared surplus in 1945, and custody was assumed by the War Assets Administration, which sold the property. It was apparently abandoned by 1949. The War Assets Administration terminated the leases and sold the purchased property. The private owners apparently accepted ownership of some of the improvements in lieu of a restoration that might have been required.

The Hereford airfield was apparently reused for some period of time as a civil airport, as the 1983 USGS topo map labeled the site as "Hereford Airport", but only depicted the north–south runway. The other two runways were not depicted at all. However, this rejuvenation of the field was evidently short-lived, as Hereford was not listed in the 1987 Flight Guide.

It appears that one of the runways at Hereford was used by small private aircraft until about 1990. However, as of the late 1990s, the entire Hereford site was privately owned. The site has been used for a ranching operation that included the removal of almost all military structures, and the planting of grasses. The only evidence of the USAAF construction remaining was the deteriorating concrete parking apron, deteriorating bituminous runways and taxiway, and a pile of concrete tower bases.

The north–south runway has been graded and reused as Airstrip Road, and one home uses the old 500' x 500' concrete apron as its driveway. It does not appear that the 1980s redevelopment (as an airport) resulted in any improvements to the site aside from a single prefab hangar and equipment shed which were erected on the apron.

By 1998, the Hereford field was apparently abandoned again, and the land has since become part of the suburbs of fast-growing Sierra Vista. Plots have been subdivided, and several houses ranging from simple to elaborate have been built on the site.

As of 2011 the area had been extensively developed into rural residential homes, with the zoning lot size at four acres. The main runway is barely discerned as Airstrip Road, with the occasional piece of asphalt still visible in the grass.

== See also ==
- Arizona World War II Army Airfields
