= Stoval, Arizona =

- Populated place
- Location within the state of Arizona Stoval (the United States)
- Coordinates: 32°45′54″N 113°37′20″W
- Country: United States
- State: Arizona
- County: Yuma
- Elevation: 400 ft (122 m)
- Time zone: UTC-7 (Mountain (MST))
  - Summer (DST): UTC-7 (MST)
- Area code: 928
- FIPS code: 04-69970
- GNIS feature ID: 24631

Stoval is a populated place situated in Yuma County, Arizona, United States, located approximately 70 miles east of Yuma. Originally established as a stagecoach stop in 1869, named Grinnell Station after its first station master Henry Grinnell, it later served as a railroad station on the Southern Pacific Railroad's Sunset Route. Circa 1875 the name was changed to Texas Hill, after a group of emigrants from Texas who were supposedly killed in the area. In 1882–83, Oscar F. Thornton emigrated from California and established a farming community near the station. Due to the fertility of the farmland, he named his community Christvale. Thornton became the first postmaster of the Christvale post office when it was established on September 25, 1888. Railroad personnel did not like the name, however, and shortened it to Chrystoval (or Crystoval). With the advent of the telegraph, the name was further shortened to its present-day Stoval in approximately 1911, in order to save on telegraphing. After closing down at some point, the post office was re-established on May 21, 1914, under the name of Stoval. It has an estimated elevation of 400 feet (120 m) above sea level.
