= Bisbee Douglas International Airport =

Airport in Cochise County, Arizona

- IATA: DUG; ICAO: KDUG; FAA LID: DUG

Summary
- Airport type: Public
- Owner: Cochise County
- Serves: Douglas & Bisbee in Arizona
- Location: Cochise County, Arizona
- Elevation AMSL: 4,150 ft (1,260 m)
- Coordinates: 31°28′08″N 109°36′13″W
- Website: www.cochise.az.gov/207/Bisbee-Douglas-International-Airport

Map
- Location within Arizona Location within the United States

Runways
Direction	Length		Surface
Direction	ft	m	Surface
17/35	7,311	2,228	Asphalt
8/26	5,000	1,524	Asphalt

Statistics (2009)
- Aircraft operations: 19,650
- Based aircraft: 19
- Source: Federal Aviation Administration

Bisbee Douglas International Airport (IATA: DUG, ICAO: KDUG, FAA LID: DUG) is a county-owned airport 9 miles (7.8 nmi; 14 km) northwest of Douglas and 17 miles (15 nmi; 27 km) east of Bisbee, both in Cochise County, Arizona, United States, that was formerly known as Douglas Army Airfield (Douglas AAF). The FAA's National Plan of Integrated Airport Systems for 2009–2013 categorizes it as a general aviation facility.

== History ==
=== World War II ===
Bisbee Douglas International Airport was constructed during World War II as a U.S. Army Air Forces installation known as Douglas Army Airfield. Douglas AAF conducted advanced training in the AT-9 Jeep, AT-17 BobcT, and C-45 Expeditor training aircraft and the B-25 Mitchell bomber.

In addition to Douglas AAF, five auxiliary airfields were constructed in the area for emergency and overflow use:

- McNeal Field (Aux #1) 31°36′21″N 109°39′09″W
- Forrest Field (Aux #2) 31°22′27″N 109°40′30″W
- Webb Coutland (Elfrida) Field (Aux #3) 31°46′24″N 109°41′49″W
- Auxiliary Field 4 is unknown
- Hereford Army Airfield (Aux #5) 31°24′57″N 110°08′51″W

== Historical airline service ==
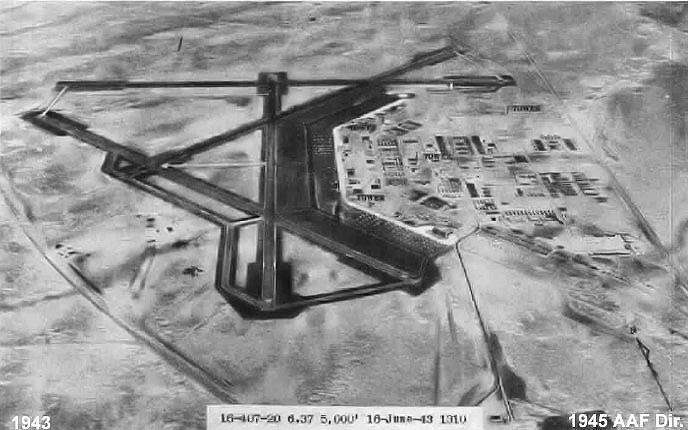
Oblique June 1943 photo of Douglas Army Airfield

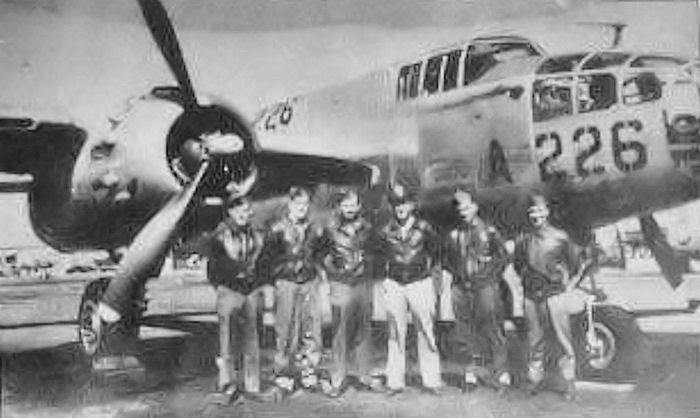
B-25 aircrew training at Douglas AAF, 1944

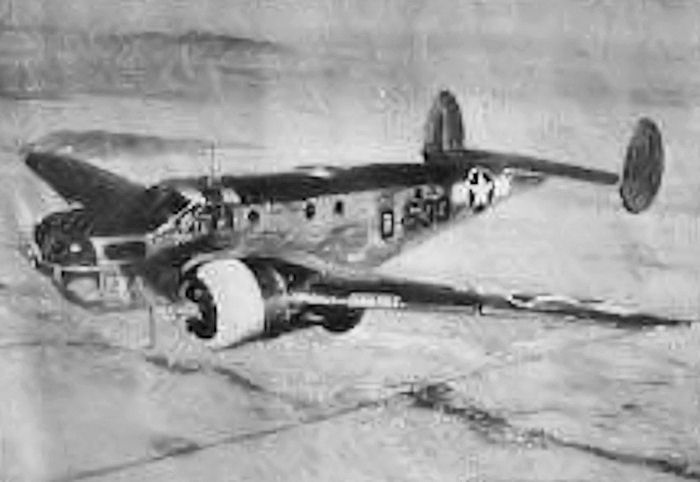
Douglas C-45 Expeditor trainer, 1944

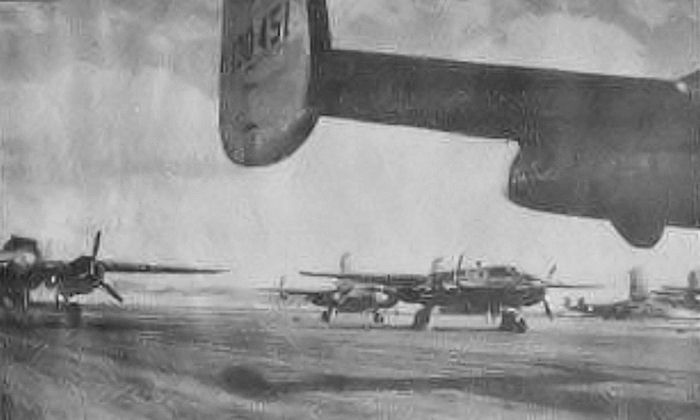
B-25s on the Douglas AAF parking apron, 1944

With the end of World War II, Douglas AAF was considered surplus to military needs and was transferred to local government authorities of the city of Douglas for conversion to a civilian airport. American Airlines served the airport as Bisbee/Douglas was a stop along a transcontinental multi-stop route. The carrier flew Douglas DC-3, Convair 240, and by 1952 Douglas DC-6 propliners with daily flights in each direction between the east coast and the west coast. In 1959 the westbound routing was New York Newark (EWR) – Philadelphia (PHL) – Washington D.C. (DCA) – Memphis (MEM) – Fort Worth (GSW) – El Paso (ELP) – Bisbee/Douglas (DUG) – Tucson (TUS) – Phoenix (PHX) – San Diego (SAN) – Los Angeles (LAX). By 1963, American was still serving the airport with two daily flights operated with the DC-6. The westbound routing was Dallas (DAL) – Midland/Odessa (MAF) – El Paso – Bisbee/Douglas – Tucson – Phoenix – San Diego – Los Angeles. American Airlines flights ended in 1965 and were replaced with commuter flights to Tucson and Phoenix provided by Apache Airlines using de Havilland Dove aircraft.

The original Frontier Airlines (1950–1986) briefly served Bisbee/Douglas in the early 1950s using DC-3s on flights to Phoenix, stopping at Nogales and Tucson, Arizona.

Apache Airlines service ended in 1970 and was followed by Cochise Airlines which served the airport from 1971 through 1975 using de Havilland Twin Otters.

Copper State Airlines provided service from 1980 through 1982 using Piper Navajos.

Sierra Vista Aviation was the final carrier at Bisbee/Douglas from 1983 through 1987 also using Piper Navajos.

== Facilities ==
The airport covers 3,000 acres (1,200 ha) at an elevation of 4,154 feet (1,266 m). It has two asphalt runways: 17/35 is 7,311 by 100 feet (2,228 x 30 m) and 8/26 is 5,000 by 75 feet (1,524 x 23 m).

In the year ending March 31, 2009, the airport had 19,650 aircraft operations, average 53 per day: 71% general aviation and 29% military. 19 aircraft were then based at the airport: 95% single-engine and 5% multi-engine.

== See also ==
- List of airports in Arizona
- Arizona World War II Army Airfields
- 37th Flying Training Wing (World War II)
