= Gila Bend Air Force Auxiliary Field =

Airfield in Maricopa County, Arizona, US

- Part of Barry M. Goldwater Air Force Range
- Gila Bend, Arizona in the United States of America
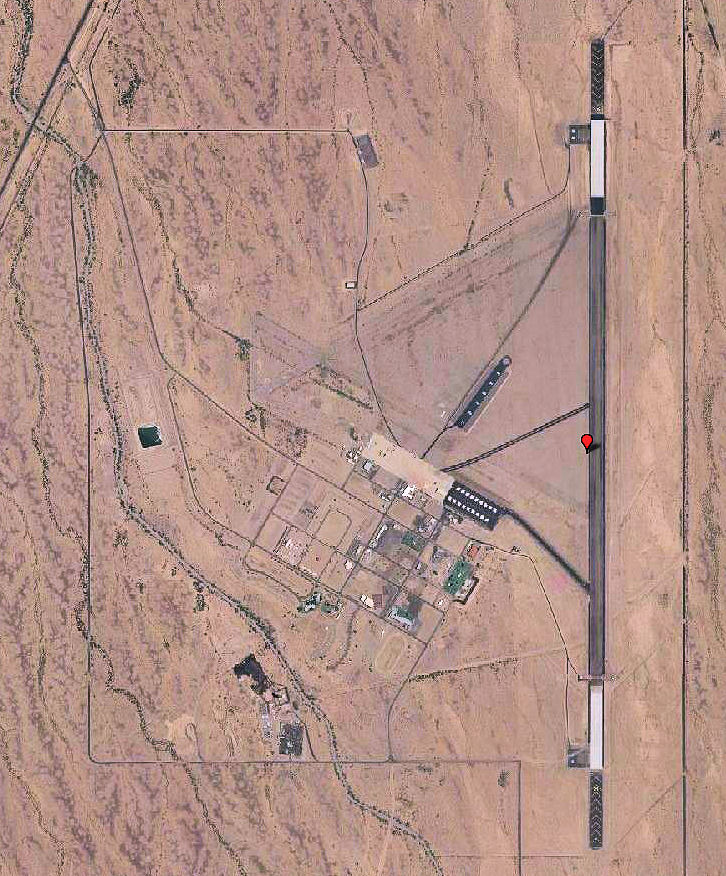
- A US Geological Survey aerial image from 2006

Site information
- Type: US Air Force auxiliary airfield
- Owner: Department of Defense
- Operator: US Air Force
- Controlled by: Air Education and Training Command (AETC)
- Condition: Operational

Location
- Location in the United States
- Coordinates: 32°53′15″N 112°43′12″W

Site history
- Built: 1942
- In use: 1942 – present

Garrison information
- Garrison: 56th Range Management Office

Airfield information
- Identifiers: ICAO: KGXF, FAA LID: GXF, WMO: 747240
- Elevation: 269.1 metres (883 ft) AMSL
Runways
Direction	Length and surface
17/35	2,591.4 metres (8,502 ft) asphalt
- Source: AirNav.com

Gila Bend Air Force Auxiliary Field (ICAO: KGXF, FAA LID: GXF) is a United States Air Force auxiliary airfield used as an emergency landing facility by Luke Air Force Base and Davis-Monthan Air Force Base aircraft and units from other nearby bases using the Barry M. Goldwater Air Force Range complex. The airfield is located 3.5 miles (3.0 nmi; 5.6 km) south of Interstate 8 and the central business district of Gila Bend, in Maricopa County, Arizona, United States.

Although many US airports use the same three-letter location identifier for the FAA and IATA, this facility is assigned GXF by the FAA but has no designation from the IATA.

== History ==
The facility was opened in July 1942 when it was part of the Gila Bend Gunnery Range. During World War II it was under the command of the 492d (Reduced) Army Air Force Base Unit, AAF West Coast Training Center. It served as the range headquarters for a massive bombing and gunnery range, now known as the Barry M. Goldwater Range, and for maintenance of the range and range targets. It remained an active Air Force facility staffed by USAF personnel until approximately 1995. It was also used as an auxiliary landing field. As of 2011, this role is handled by private contractors utilizing portions of the facility.

Auxiliary fields to Gila Bend AFAF (all on the Goldwater Range) are:

- Gila Bend #6/Williams AAF #4: 32°43′11″N 112°51′14″W
- Gila Bend #6/Williams AAF #5: 32°49′05″N 112°54′54″W
- Gila Bend #6/Williams AAF #6: 32°53′05″N 112°48′59″W

== Facilities ==
Gila Bend Air Force Auxiliary Field has one runway designated Rwy 17/35 with an asphalt surface measuring 8,500 ft × 150 ft (2,591 m × 46 m).

== See also ==
- Arizona World War II Army Airfields
- List of United States Air Force installations
