= Echeverria Field =

WWII-era USAAF airfield in Arizona

Wickenburg Field
- Part of Army Air Forces Training Command
- Maricopa County, near Wickenburg, Arizona
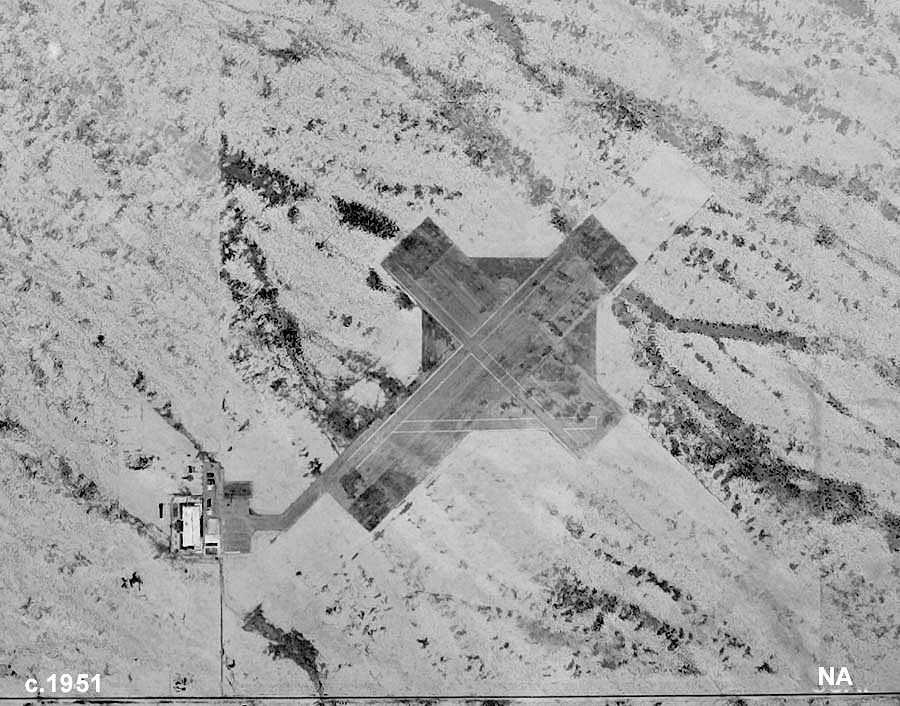
- USGS 1951 airphoto

Site information
- Type: Basic flying training airfield
- Owner: United States Army Air Forces
- Controlled by: USAAF West Coast Training Center
- Condition: Abandoned

Location
- Coordinates: 33°57′14″N 112°59′32″W

Site history
- Built: 1942
- In use: 1942–1944
- Events: World War II

Echeverria Field is an abandoned airfield, located approximately 15 miles (24 km) west of Wickenburg, Arizona.

== History ==
=== World War II ===
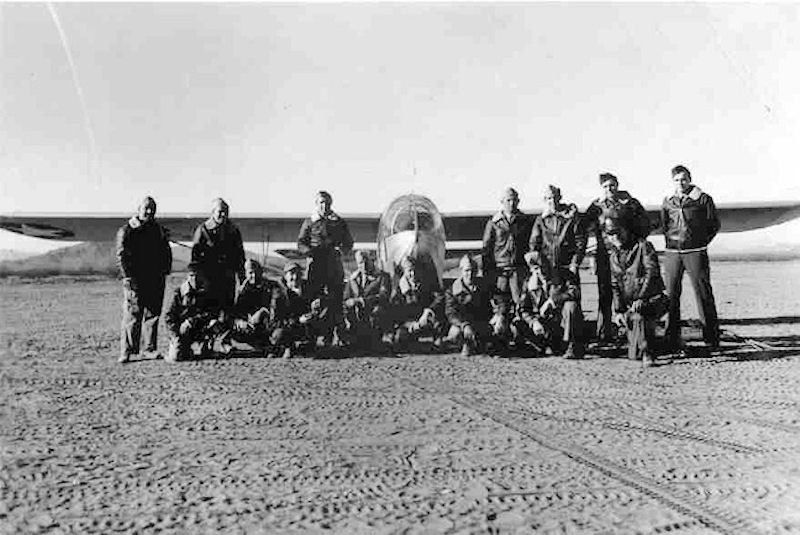
5th Glider Training Detachment – Glider Cadets and a Taylorcraft TG-6A Glider.

Opened in June 1942 as Wickenburg Field, the airfield was built by the United States Army Air Forces, the airfield provided primary glider pilot training to flight cadets. Due to the desert landscape where it was built, the airfield consisted of a 4,000' NE/SW main (04/22) and 3,200' NW/SE (13/29) asphalt runways.

The glider school was operated under contract by the Arizona Gliding Academy, it was under the general supervision of the 11th Glider Training Detachment, 36th Flying Training Wing, Western Flying Training Command. Training was conducted using Taylorcraft TG-6A combat training gliders, towed by C-47 Skytrain aircraft.

The flight cadets consisted of both experienced sailplane pilots and others who had washed out of conventional pilot training and were given a second chance to fly, The possibility of officer's pay and the chance to fly attracted a particular breed of risk-tolerant trainees. Trainees were given instruction on how to follow a tow plane and fly the unpowered aircraft to the designated landing zone.

Unlike powered pilots, combat training was also provided, as once a pilot committed to a landing and discovered, as he got closer, frequently the landing zone was under fire, mined, or otherwise obstructed, he had little room to maneuver to make a safe landing. Once the landing was made, the glider pilot then became another infantryman.

Once the Glider Pilot Cadet successfully completed their primary training, they moved on to advanced training, taught by AAF instructors at several military glider schools.

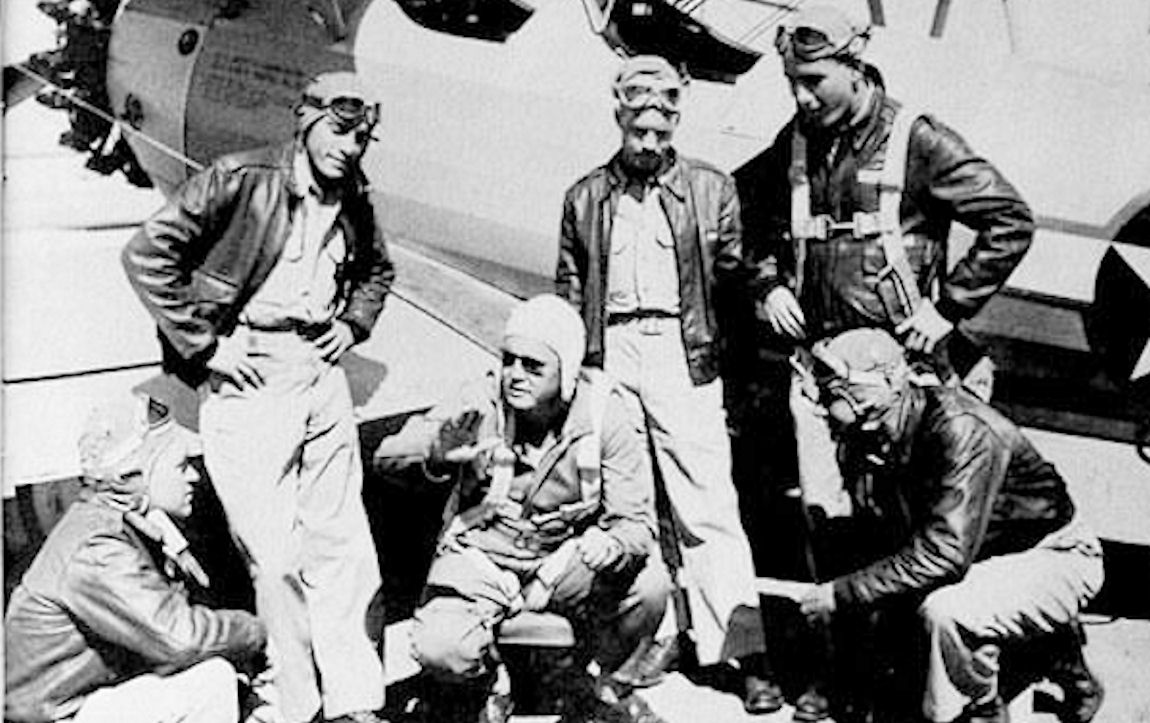
Claiborne Flight Academy flight instructor with Army Flight Cadets next to a PT-17 Stearman at Echeverria Field, 1944

The glider school was closed in March, 1943 as part of the drawdown of the Army Air Forces glider training program. However, the facility got a second life as a Contract Flying School, and was re-equipped with PT-17 Stearman primary flight trainers. Renamed Echeverria Field, it was re-garrisoned by the 16th Flying Training Detachment. Flight training was carried out by the Claiborne Flight Academy. With the switchover to powered flight training, the main runway was extended to 4,500' and a satellite airfield was established for emergencies near Aguila, AZ.

The cadets at the school received both ground and flight instruction; with a ratio of one instructor to one cadet for the nine-week course. The mission of the school was to train the best pilots possible for the USAAF, and this was done with a highly rigorous and demanding course of which many cadets were unable to complete satisfactory. In addition to pilots, a ground mechanic school was conducted with the same high level of training and demands on the students.

Echeverria Field was inactivated in April 1944 with the drawdown of AAFTC's pilot training program. The airfield was turned over to civil control at the end of the war though the War Assets Administration (WAA).

=== Civil use ===
The field was used by various private entities after the war, including being a prison & housing migrant workers. Wickenburg was used at some point between 1958 and 1962 as a municipal airport for Wickenburg until a new facility was built closer to town.

Today the facility is abandoned. The main runway appears to have been extended after the war, secondary barely visible in aerial photography. Derelict hangar and a minor structure still standing, however some concrete building foundations is all that remain of the airport/airfield ground station and a street pattern in derelict condition.

== See also ==
- Arizona World War II Army Airfields
- 36th Flying Training Wing (World War II)
