= Laguna Army Air Field =

Military airport located at Yuma Proving Ground, Arizona

Laguna Army Airfield
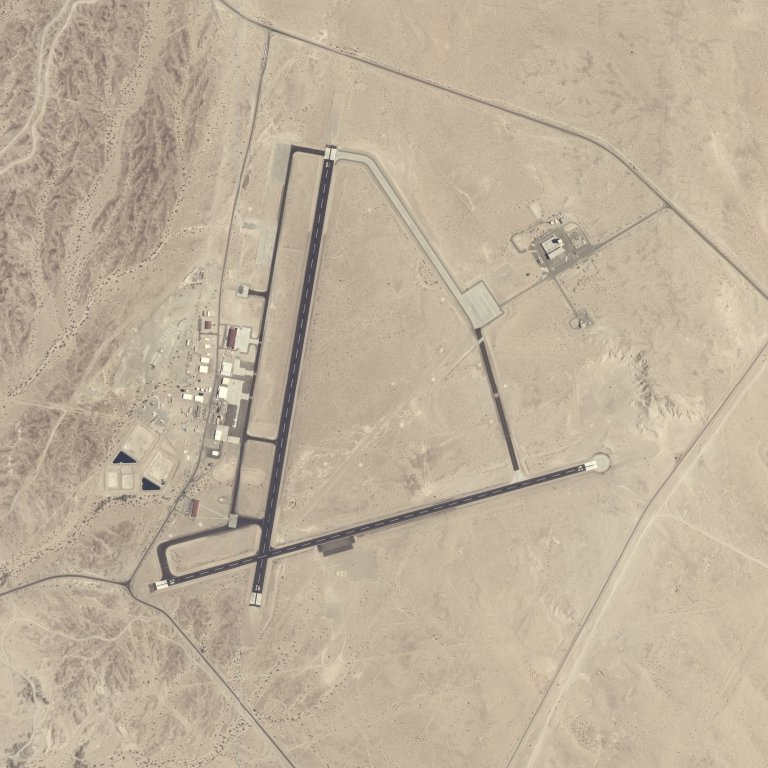
- IATA: LGF; ICAO: KLGF; FAA LID: LGF

Summary
- Airport type: Military
- Operator: United States Army
- Location: Yuma Proving Ground, Arizona
- Elevation AMSL: 433 ft / 132 m
- Coordinates: 32°51′58″N 114°23′52″W
- Interactive map of Laguna Army Airfield

Runways
Direction	Length		Surface
Direction	ft	m	Surface
18/36	6,118	1,865	Asphalt
6/24	6,000	1,829	Asphalt
- Sources: FAA and GNIS

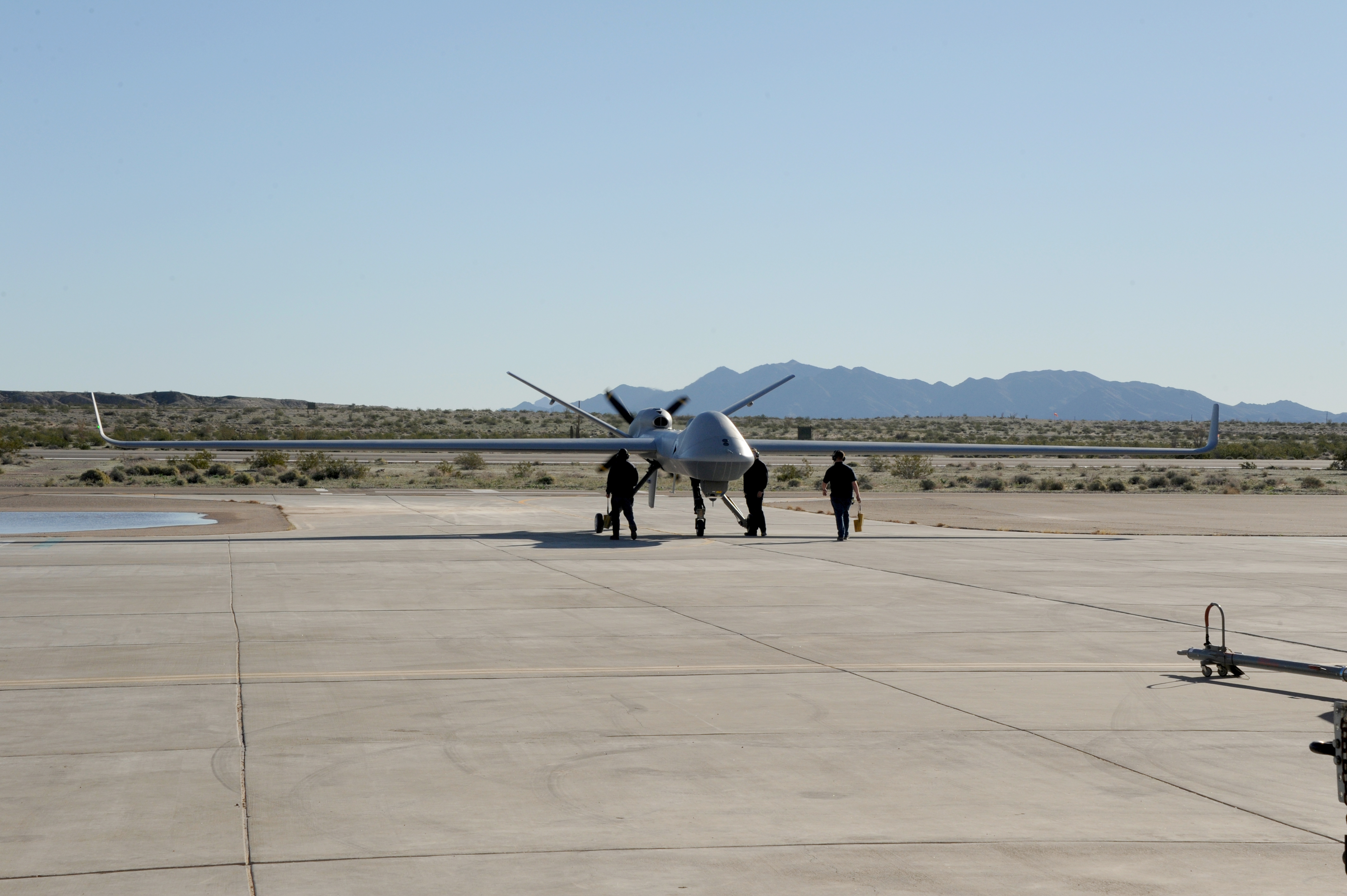
The MQ-9B Sky Guardian used Laguna Army Airfield for testing and certification, including achieving a 48.2 hour endurance record and getting the first FAA certification of an unmanned aircraft to fly in civilian air space.

Laguna Army Airfield (IATA: LGF, ICAO: KLGF, FAA LID: LGF) is a military airport located at Yuma Proving Ground, 14 miles (12 nmi; 23 km) northeast of the central business district of Yuma, a city in Yuma County, Arizona, United States. The airport has an active air traffic control tower within class D airspace.

Laguna Army Airfield was built during World War II as an auxiliary field that served Camp Laguna and the Yuma Army Air Field (now Marine Corps Air Station Yuma). It is one of many Arizona World War II Army Airfields.

== Facilities ==
Laguna Army Airfield has two asphalt paved runways:

- 18/36 measuring 6,118 by 150 feet (1,865 x 46 m)
- 6/24 measuring 6,000 by 100 feet (1,829 x 30 m)

== See also ==
- Marine Corps Air Station Yuma
- Arizona World War II Army Airfields
- List of airports in Arizona
