= Picacho, Arizona =

- Census-designated place
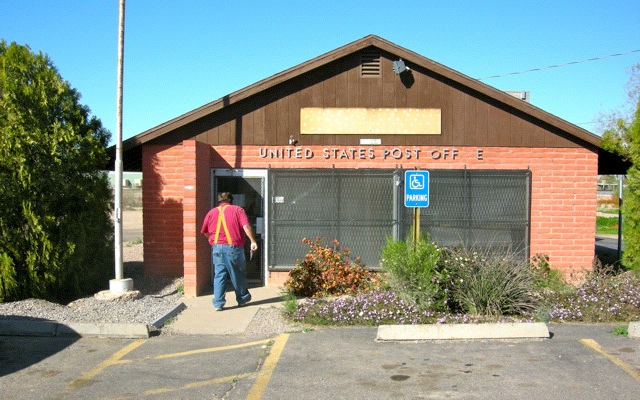
- Picacho post office (Demolished)

- Location in Pinal County and the state of Arizona

- Location in the United States
- Coordinates: 32°42′58″N 111°29′43″W
- Country: United States
- State: Arizona
- County: Pinal

Area
  - Total: 6.11 sq mi (15.82 km^{2})
  - Land: 6.09 sq mi (15.77 km^{2})
  - Water: 0.019 sq mi (0.05 km^{2})
- Elevation: 1,614 ft (492 m)

Population (2020)
  - Total: 250
  - Density: 41.1/sq mi (15.85/km^{2})
- Time zone: UTC-7 (Mountain (MST))
- ZIP code: 85241
- Area code: 520
- GNIS feature ID: 9393

Picacho (/piːkɑːtʃoʊ/) is an unincorporated community and census-designated place in Pinal County, Arizona, United States. The population was 250 at the 2020 census.

Picacho is located near Interstate 10, 4.5 miles (7.2 km) southeast of Eloy and 7 miles (11 km) northwest of Picacho Peak State Park. Picacho has a post office with ZIP code 85241, which opened in 1881. The community's name is Spanish for "peak" and is derived from the Picacho Mountains. Picacho has a ZIP Code of 85241; in 2000, the population of the 85241 ZCTA was 521.

By late 2012, parts of Picacho were to be removed under Arizona eminent domain law on account of Interstate 10 expansion.

== Demographics ==
Historical population
Census	Pop.	Note	%±
2010	471		—
2020	250		−46.9%
U.S. Decennial Census

In 2010 Picacho had a population of 471. The racial and ethnic makeup of the population was 62.4% Hispanic or Latino, 33.8% non-Hispanic white, 0.6% non-Hispanic black, 0.7% Hispanic blacks, 1.5% non-Hispanic Native American, 1.0% Hispanic Native Americans, 0.6% non-Hispanics reporting some other race and 7.0% of the population reporting two or more races.

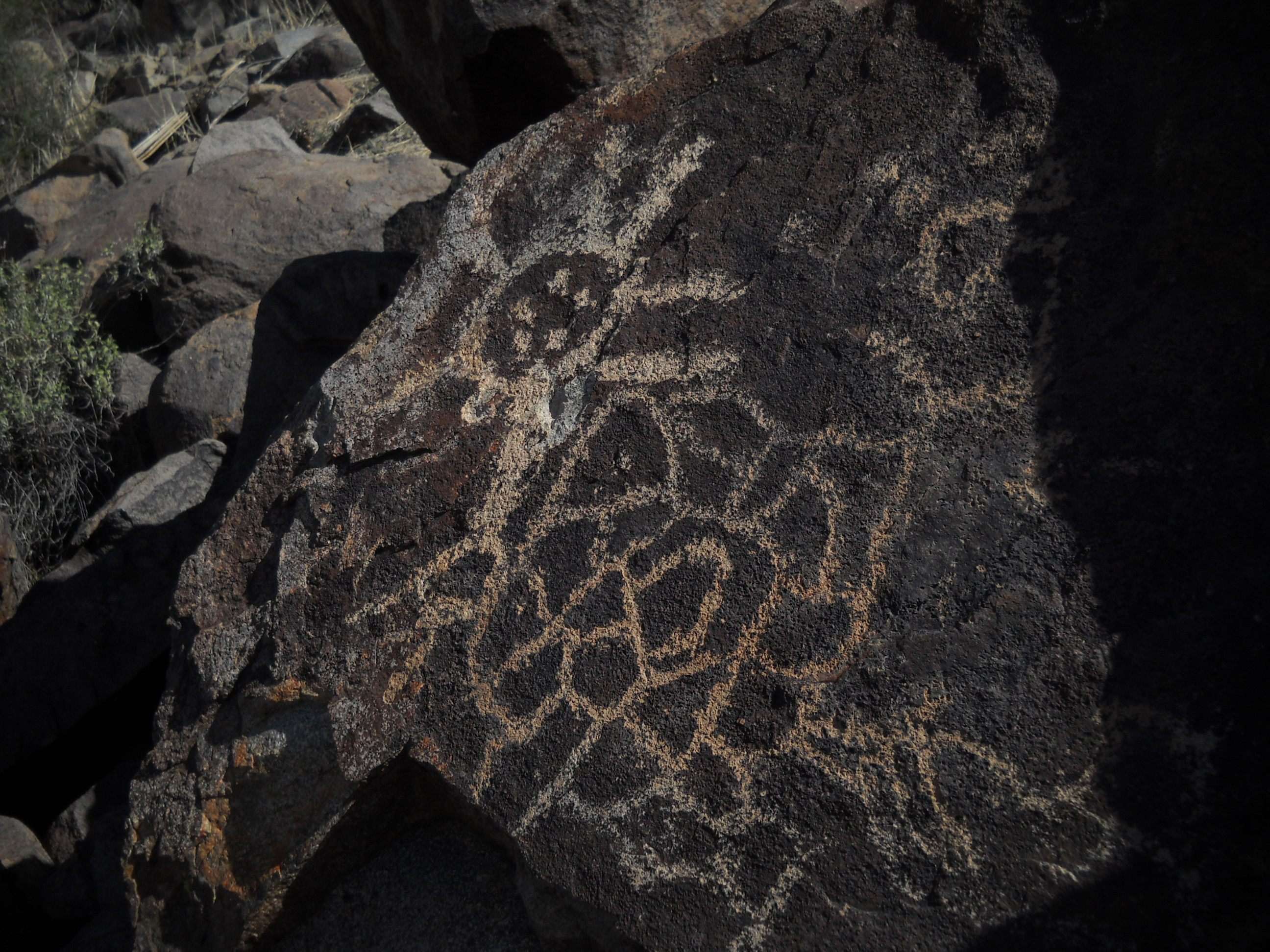
Petroglyphs in the Picacho Mountains, near Picacho Peak State Park

== Climate ==
According to the Köppen Climate Classification system, Picacho has a hot desert climate, abbreviated "BWh" on climate maps. The hottest temperature recorded in Picacho was 119 °F (48.3 °C) on July 28, 1995, while the coldest temperature recorded was 18 °F (−7.8 °C) on January 15, 2007.

Climate data for Picacho, Arizona, 1991–2020 normals, extremes 1987–present
Month	Jan	Feb	Mar	Apr	May	Jun	Jul	Aug	Sep	Oct	Nov	Dec	Year
Record high °F (°C)	85 (29)	89 (32)	99 (37)	105 (41)	112 (44)	118 (48)	119 (48)	114 (46)	114 (46)	106 (41)	100 (38)	84 (29)	119 (48)
Mean maximum °F (°C)	77.9 (25.5)	81.6 (27.6)	89.3 (31.8)	97.7 (36.5)	104.9 (40.5)	111.4 (44.1)	112.2 (44.6)	110.3 (43.5)	106.7 (41.5)	99.6 (37.6)	89.0 (31.7)	77.5 (25.3)	113.6 (45.3)
Mean daily maximum °F (°C)	66.7 (19.3)	70.6 (21.4)	77.9 (25.5)	85.8 (29.9)	94.6 (34.8)	103.7 (39.8)	104.4 (40.2)	102.6 (39.2)	98.6 (37.0)	88.7 (31.5)	76.4 (24.7)	65.6 (18.7)	86.3 (30.2)
Daily mean °F (°C)	53.8 (12.1)	56.9 (13.8)	63.0 (17.2)	69.9 (21.1)	78.7 (25.9)	88.1 (31.2)	91.2 (32.9)	90.1 (32.3)	85.3 (29.6)	74.5 (23.6)	62.5 (16.9)	52.8 (11.6)	72.2 (22.3)
Mean daily minimum °F (°C)	41.0 (5.0)	43.3 (6.3)	48.2 (9.0)	54.1 (12.3)	62.9 (17.2)	72.4 (22.4)	78.1 (25.6)	77.6 (25.3)	72.0 (22.2)	60.4 (15.8)	48.6 (9.2)	40.1 (4.5)	58.2 (14.6)
Mean minimum °F (°C)	28.3 (−2.1)	32.2 (0.1)	36.4 (2.4)	42.5 (5.8)	51.5 (10.8)	62.0 (16.7)	68.8 (20.4)	69.3 (20.7)	61.5 (16.4)	47.1 (8.4)	34.8 (1.6)	27.6 (−2.4)	25.5 (−3.6)
Record low °F (°C)	18 (−8)	19 (−7)	28 (−2)	36 (2)	42 (6)	50 (10)	58 (14)	62 (17)	52 (11)	35 (2)	25 (−4)	20 (−7)	18 (−8)
Average precipitation inches (mm)	1.01 (26)	1.15 (29)	0.90 (23)	0.28 (7.1)	0.22 (5.6)	0.20 (5.1)	1.26 (32)	1.86 (47)	0.92 (23)	0.49 (12)	0.51 (13)	1.15 (29)	9.95 (251.8)
Average precipitation days (≥ 0.01 in)	4.1	3.9	3.3	1.3	1.1	1.0	5.4	6.1	3.5	2.5	2.7	4.2	39.1
Average relative humidity (%)	43	39	29	21	19	17	31	33	33	32	34	45	31
Mean monthly sunshine hours	220.1	254.3	288.3	327.0	372.0	366.0	372.0	378.2	291.0	251.1	219.0	213.9	3,552.9
Mean daily sunshine hours	7.1	9	9.3	10.9	12	12.2	12	12.2	9.7	8.1	7.3	6.9	9.7
Mean daily daylight hours	10.3	11.0	12.0	13.0	13.9	14.3	14.1	13.3	12.4	11.4	10.5	10.0	12.2
Percentage possible sunshine	69	82	78	84	86	85	85	92	78	71	70	69	79
Average ultraviolet index	4	4	6	6	7	8	8	8	7	5	4	3	6
Source 1: NOAA
Source 2: National Weather Service Weather Atlas (humidity, sun data)
