= Southern Air Transport =

US cargo airline (1947–1998) once owned by the CIA

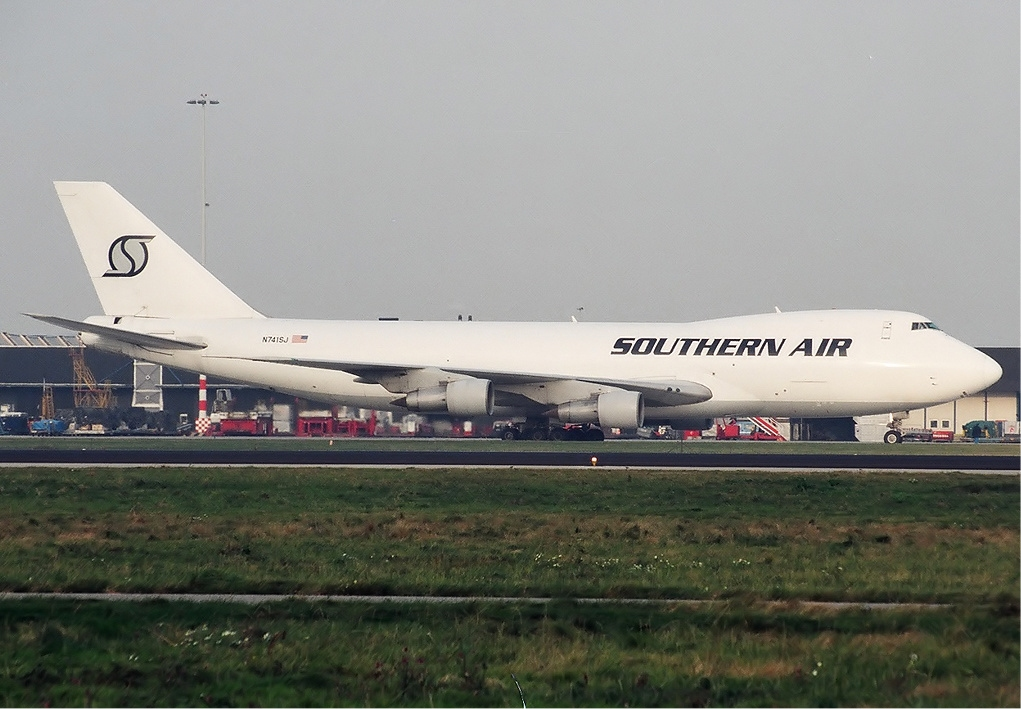
- Boeing 747-200
IATA	ICAO	Call sign
SJ	SJM	SOUTHERN AIR
- Founded: October 11, 1949 incorporated in Florida
- Commenced operations: February 1947
- Ceased operations: 1998
- Operating bases: Columbus–Rickenbacker; Miami; Tainan; Yokota
- Fleet size: See Fleet below
- Parent company: Pacific Corporation (1960–1973)
- Headquarters: Columbus, Ohio, United States; Miami, Florida, United States
- Key people: Stanley G. Williams; James H. Bastian; George A. Doole Jr.
- Founder: F. C. "Doc" Moor

Southern Air Transport (SAT), based in Miami, Florida, United States, was, in its final incarnation, a cargo airline. However, it started life as an irregular air carrier (later known as a supplemental air carrier), a type of carrier defined and tightly controlled until 1978 by the Civil Aeronautics Board (CAB), a now defunct Federal agency that, at the time, closely regulated almost all US commercial air transportation. From 1960 to 1973, the small carrier was secretly owned by the Central Intelligence Agency (CIA), which used it to support its activities primarily in Southeast Asia connected with the Vietnam war, though SAT continued to function in other regards as a normal charter airline. During this period, SAT was part of a complex of CIA-owned carriers, including Air America and Intermountain Aviation. Having no further use of the carrier, the CIA decided to sell it in the early 1970s, but its ownership leaked in what became a storm of controversy.

The carrier was also known for its role in the Iran-Contra scandal of the mid-1980s, during which SAT transported arms to Iran and to the US-backed anti-communist right-wing rebels in Central America known as the Contras, which were fighting the revolutionary Sandinista government in Nicaragua.

In the mid-1990s, SAT ranked as the 10th largest all-cargo airline in the world by ton-miles carried.

After SAT ceased operation in 1998, many of its assets were used to start another airline, the similarly named Southern Air.

== History ==
=== Early days ===
Southern Air Transport (SAT) was initially a sole proprietorship of F.C. "Doc" Moor, a pilot who had flown for a number of airlines, including Pan Am. The initial period of activity lasted from February 1947 to January 1949, when Moor suspended operations to work for the Venezuelan carrier RANSA. Southern Air Transport was incorporated in Florida on 31 October 1949, Moor being president. SAT flew mostly cargo, but also some passenger traffic. SAT was an irregular air carrier, a type of airline later known as a supplemental air carrier. In 1953, 37% of SAT's revenue was military and it had two C-46 aircraft, producing a break-even financial result.

=== CIA era ===
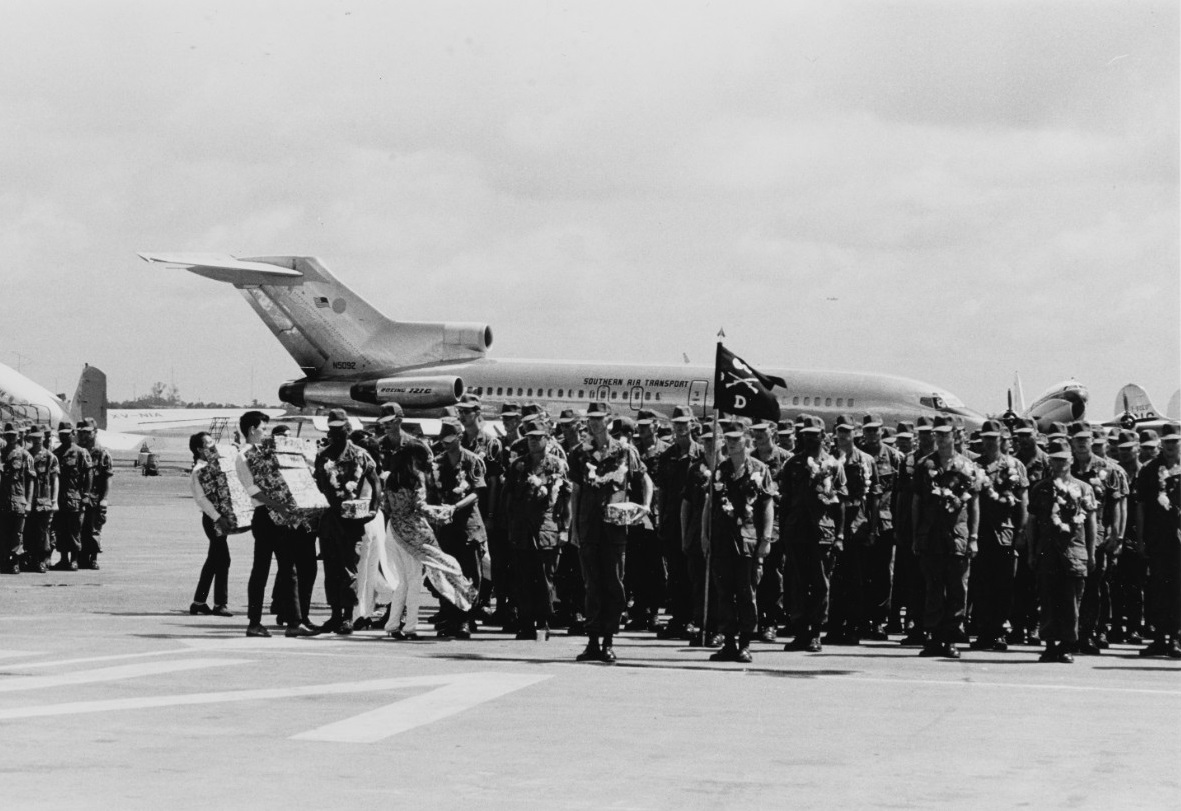
CIA-era Southern Air Transport Boeing 727-100C at Tan Son Nhut Air Base July 1969. Owner of registration number N5092 was Air America

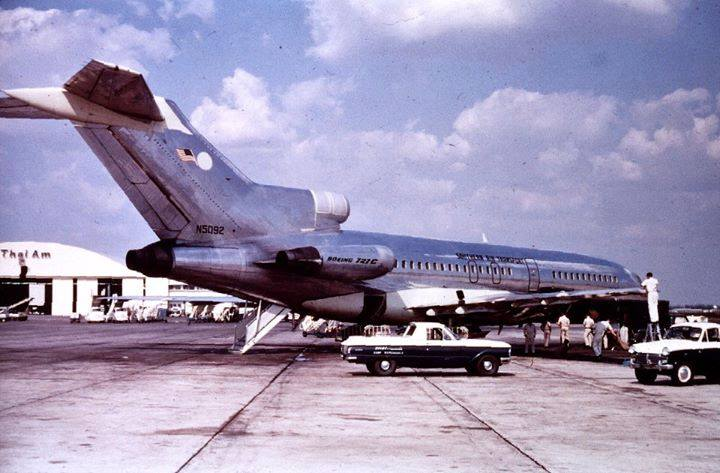
Same aircraft as above, Thailand

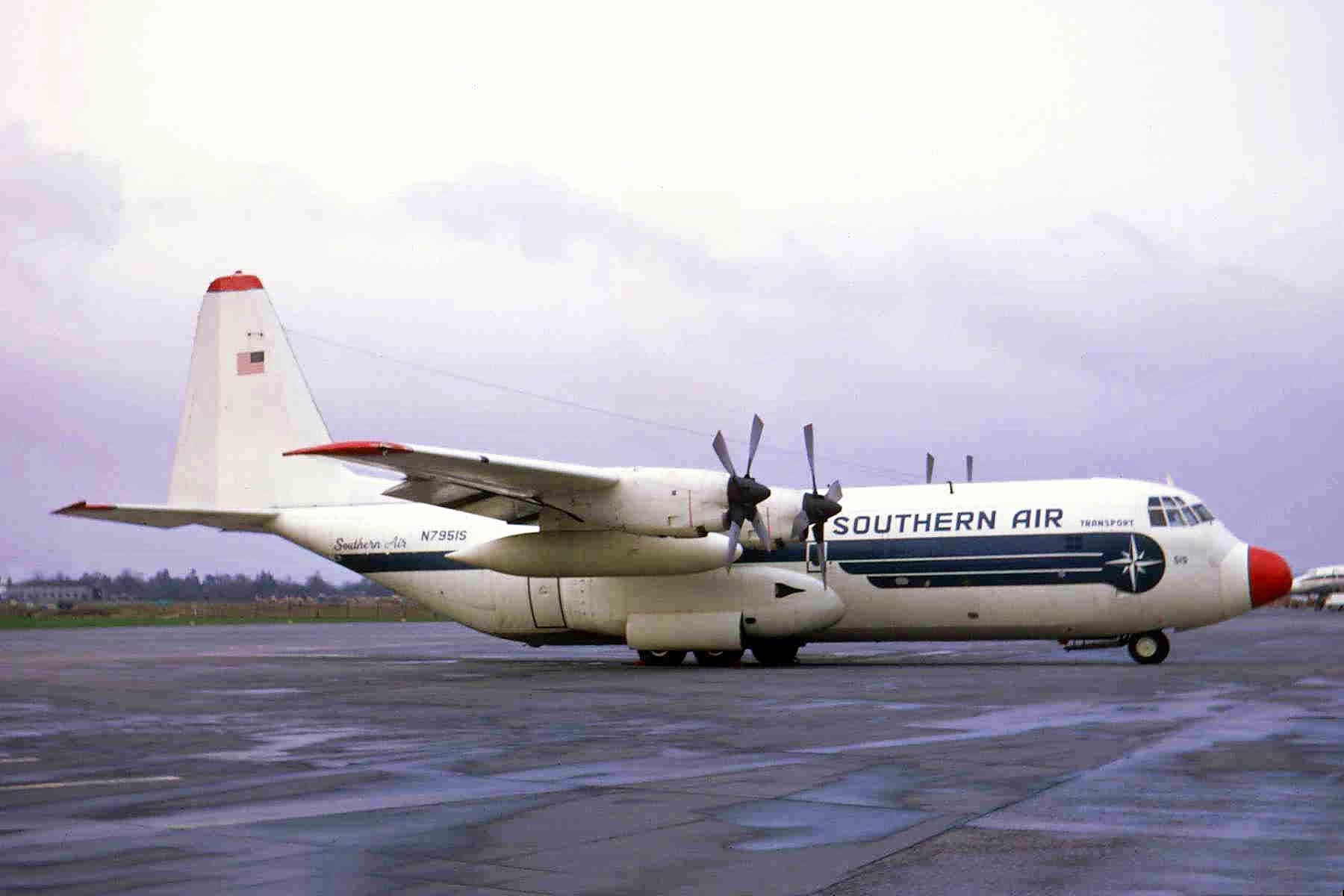
CIA-era Lockheed L-100 Hercules at London Gatwick Airport 1970. Note the eight-point compass motif. The CIA has a sixteen-point compass on its seal

The CIA purchased the airline on 5 August 1960, for $260,000 to Doc Moor and $40,000 to Stanley G. Williams. The CIA purchased SAT after consulting the CAB, driven by a desire to have access to heavy-lift non-governmental aircraft for CIA operational purposes without incurring significant ongoing expense. During the time the CIA owned the carrier, the CAB knew as did appropriate Congressional committees. The CIA provided the carrier with funding, allowing it to acquire larger aircraft and expand. In the three years 1957–1959, annual revenue averaged $400,000, with the military accounting for zero revenue 1957 and 1958 and less than 25% of revenue in 1959. By contrast, in the first three full years of CIA ownership, 1961–1963, revenue averaged almost $5 million per year, with the military accounting for over 80% in each of those years and profitability much improved. The CIA apparently also influenced a CAB award to provide the carrier with authority to fly civilian charters to Asia to support the Vietnam war. In July 1962, Stanley G. Williams, previously treasurer, became president, with Moor becoming chairman. The airline had four Douglas DC-6s, three C-46s and a C-45. Until his death in 1972, Doc Moor devoted much of his time to hydroplane racing, becoming national champion many times in his displacement class, sometimes delivering his boats to races using the airline.

SAT was part of group of CIA "proprietary" carriers and related businesses, including Air America, Air Asia, Civil Air Transport and Intermountain Aviation, under the Pacific Corporation parent company run by George A. Doole Jr.. The airline held itself out to the public as just another charter carrier. A 1965 advertisement in The Miami News used the tag line "You can't measure Southern Air's service" and noted its capabilities in shipping livestock, household goods and cars. However, SAT's logo was an eight-point compass — the CIA has a 16-point compass on its seal. Other connections were more obvious. The 1968 CAB annual report to Congress showed Air America as the holder of SAT's debt, and by that time, Air America was widely believed to be controlled by the CIA. As a nearby photo indicates, SAT flew a 727 for which Air America was the registered owner. In 1966, SAT ordered a Boeing 727 (specifically for use on its military transport contract in Asia) and in 1968, Lockheed L-100s, the civilian version of the C-130 Hercules military cargo aircraft. In 1970 the CAB gave the airline authority to use the L-100s for outsized cargo worldwide.

Although SAT was substantially bigger than before it was bought by the CIA, it remained small by contrast to the industry, whatever the size of the overall CIA proprietary aviation business. In 1969, SAT revenues were $11 million, whereas all US supplemental air carriers together were $361 million, against US scheduled carrier revenues of $8.8 billion. In 1969 the Atlantic fleet was six aircraft, operating out of Miami, San Juan and the Bahamas; the Pacific fleet was four aircraft, operating passenger and cargo flights for the military out of Yokota, Japan and Tainan, Taiwan. The two regions were semi-autonomous, the Pacific being CIA-centric, the Atlantic operating more-or-less conventionally, though occasionally also assisted. In January 1970, SAT was one of a consortium of airlines carrying relief to Biafra with L-100s. The L-100s ranged widely, one trip in 1971 traveling over 100,000 miles in 310 flight hours using five separate crews to Europe, Greenland, the Solomon Islands, Australia and within the United States before returning to Miami.

=== Transition from CIA ===
In September 1971, a former CIA officer went public about Air America, accusing SAT of being a CIA front that existed for the purpose of providing the CIA with a way to send personnel and munitions to fight a Latin American clandestine war. Moor and Williams denied it. At the time the Asian fleet was two 727s and the Atlantic fleet was two DC-6s and three L-100s.

In April 1972, the CIA decided it had no further need of SAT. It shut down Pacific operations pending a decision on what to do with the company. The CIA consulted with the CAB: sale to another airline required undesirable lengthy public hearings. The CAB preferred SAT not be liquidated so as to retain a potentially useful airline. Sale to management seemed like a quiet alternative. A sale was agreed in February 1973, but anticipated quick CAB approval was derailed by fierce opposition from competitors complaining of past and current competition from a government-owned airline, which reached a crescendo when the still CIA-owned SAT was awarded a contract to fly for an Air Force domestic cargo network known as Logair. A "congressional source" said SAT got greedy. Had it not sought the Air Force contract the sale might have happened. That the CIA owned SAT was no longer a secret and received wide coverage. Reports came out of past SAT missions to global hotspots in Africa and the Caribbean. The CIA decided to kill SAT, but as an alternative, management agreed to turn in the carrier's certification (making the SAT a so-called uncertificated carrier, no longer a common carrier), which meant foregoing the Air Force contract, but also removed SAT from CAB jurisdiction. The airline was sold to Williams on 31 December 1973 for less than book equity, but, as it was no longer a common carrier, its ability to generate revenue was more limited.

=== Post-CIA ===
In 1974 and 1975, the largest customer for SAT was Texaco, in 1976 it was the Air Force of Iran and SAT's net income in those years was $418,000, $844,000 and a loss of $303,000. On each of 1 January 1975 and 25 October 1975, Willams sold James H. Bastian a 20% stake in SAT. In 1977, as a result of new legislation requiring any carrier working for the Department of Defense to be certificated, Southern Air Transport applied for, and received, domestic "property" (i.e. cargo) supplemental certification, during which the airline represented that the CIA had no further involvement with the carrier. The CAB noted that certificating SAT would break the monopoly that Trans International Airlines had in the U.S. in terms of certificated carriers with the L-100 Hercules.

SAT was sold again in 1979, this time to James H. Bastian – described by the Los Angeles Times in 1986 as "a top-notch Washington, D.C., aviation attorney who had worked with Doole at the Pacific Corp. from 1961 to 1974, as secretary, vice president and general counsel." Under Bastian the company expanded its revenues (from $9.8m in 1982 to $38.m in 1985) and had over 500 employees in 1986.

=== Iran–Contra affair ===
As part of Oliver North's activities to trade arms for hostages with Iran and to support the contra rebellion in Nicaragua, Southern Air carried four loads of US weapons bound for Iran from the US to Israel, and on the return flights carried weapons destined for the US-backed right-wing Contra rebels in Nicaragua from Portugal. On 5 October 1986, a C-123K, loaded with weapons, failed to return from a scheduled drop to the Contras in Nicaragua. In charge of the operation was Felix Rodriguez. He was the logistics officer for airlifts of weapons and supplies from the Ilopango air base, in El Salvador, to the jungle hide-outs of the Contras. Rodriguez did not notify the Defense Department or the CIA but rather attempted to get word about the missing C-123K to Donald Gregg, the National Security Advisor for Vice President George H. W. Bush. The shooting down of a flight helped expose the Iran-Contra scandal. Logbooks retrieved from the wreckage linked SAT to a history of involvement with the CIA]. The logs documented several SAT flights to Barranquilla, during October 1985.

In the same time period Wanda Palacios told the FBI that SAT was running drugs. She worked in the early 1980s for Colombia's Medellin Cartel and had direct knowledge of the cartel's dealings with the CIA and the Contras. She brought her testimony to US Senator John Kerry. Wanda Palacios had witnessed in 1983–1985 in Barranquilla, the arrival of SAT planes loaded with weapons for the cartel, which would then send them to the Contras. The planes would return to the US loaded with cocaine. Palacio stated that Jorge Luis Ochoa Vásquez himself explained to her the guns-for-drugs deal with the CIA to supply the Contras. Ms. Palacios' story was subsequently established to be false. Southern Air Transport v. Post-Newsweek, 568 So. 2d 927 (Fla. 3d DC 1990).

While Iran Contra was in operation Southern Air Transport had obtained a hangar at Dover Air Force Base, a United States Air Force base located 2 miles (3.2 km) southeast of the city of Dover, Delaware.

=== 1990 Snapshot ===
A 1991 Miami Herald article provided a 1990 snapshot of the company. SAT made just over $150 million revenue in 1990 (around $370 million in 2025 terms). A typical annual revenue split was 40% military/60% commercial but military share was atypically high in 1990 due to the Gulf War. Major programs and annual amounts for the company included:

- Military:
  - Logair: Air Force domestic freight program, $30 million
  - Quicktrans: US Navy program similar to Logair, $20 million
  - Military Airlift Command: international charters on behalf of the US military, $10 million
  - Gulf War: additional military business supporting the war, $12 million
- Commercial:
  - Burlington Air Express: flying on behalf of this overnight air express company, $20 million
  - Japan Air Lines: SAT flew cargo on behalf of this carrier, $18 million
  - Relief agencies: On behalf of Lutheran World Federation, Red Cross, AmeriCares & the United Nations, $10 million
  - Other commercial clients

=== 1986–1999 ===
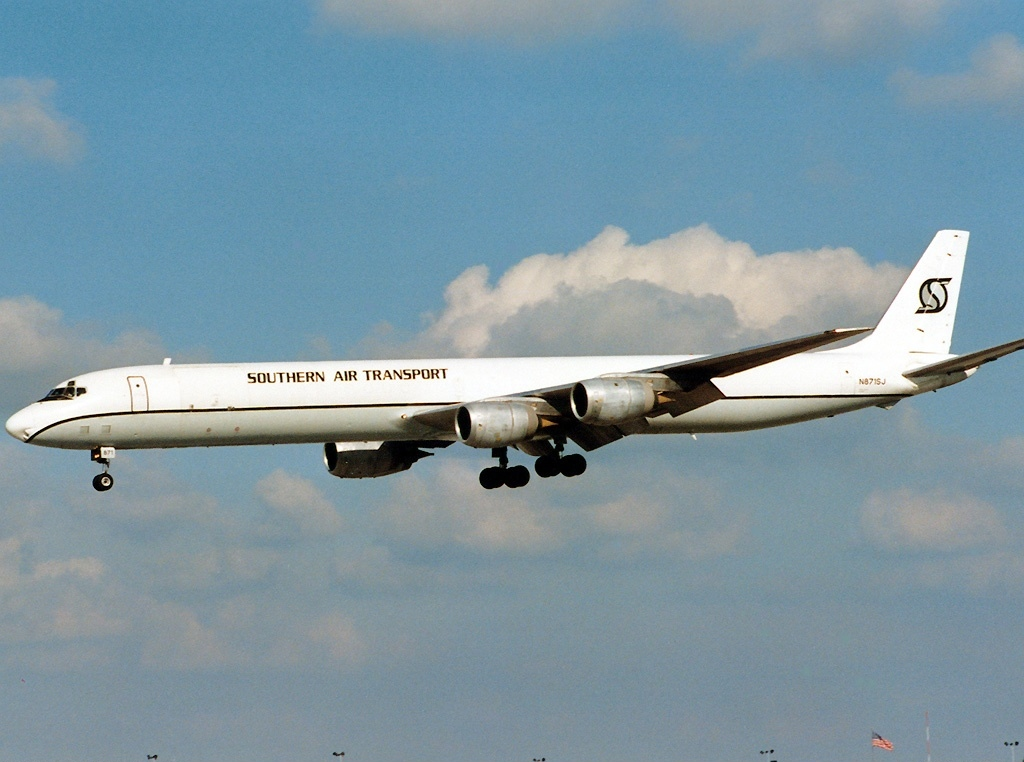
DC-8-71 Miami 1992

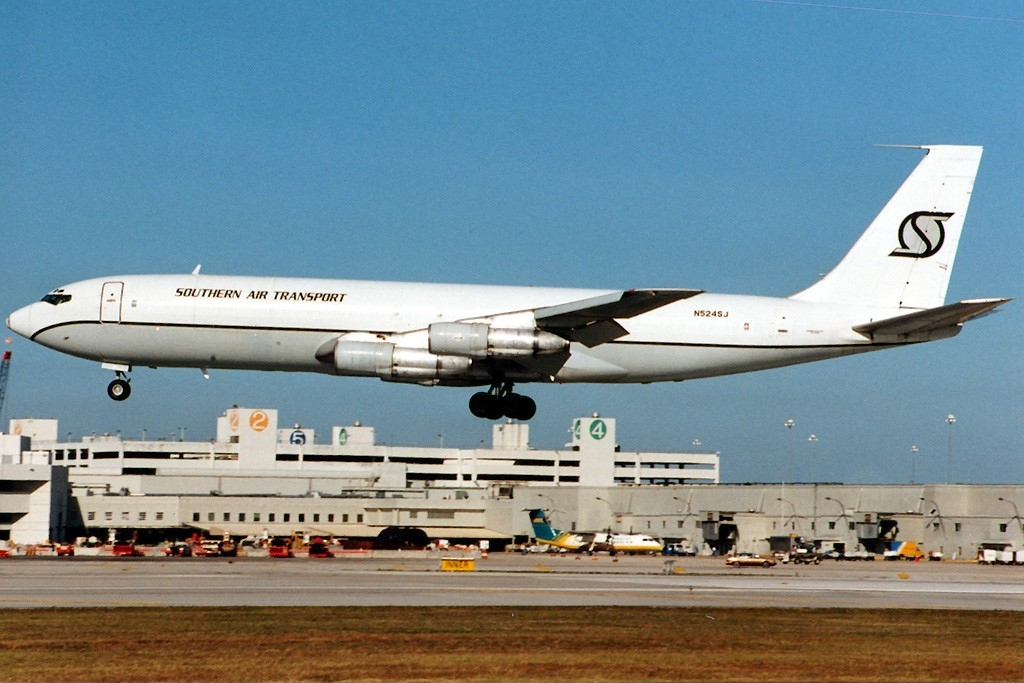
707-300 Miami 1992

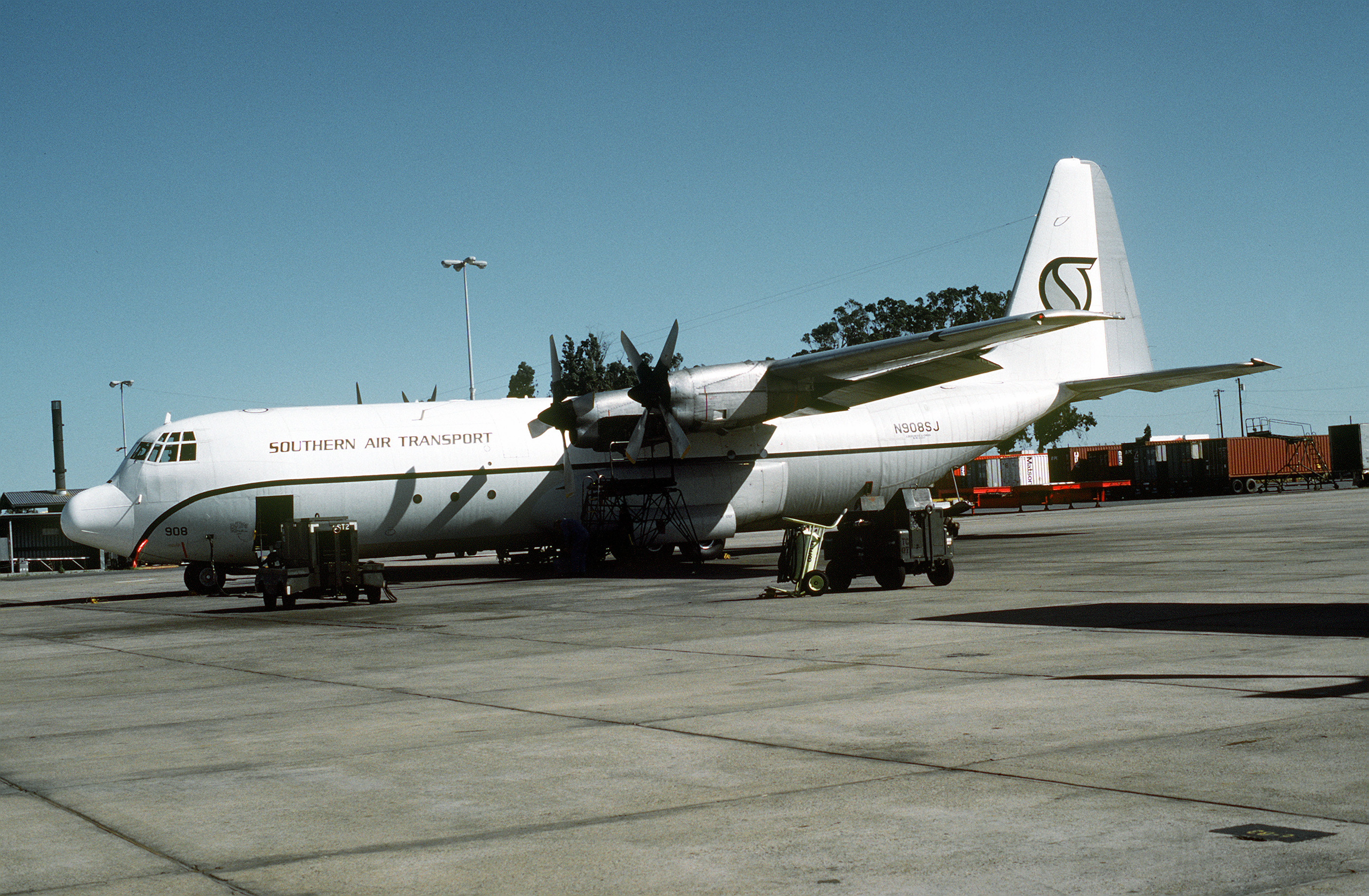
L-100-30 Travis AFB 1993

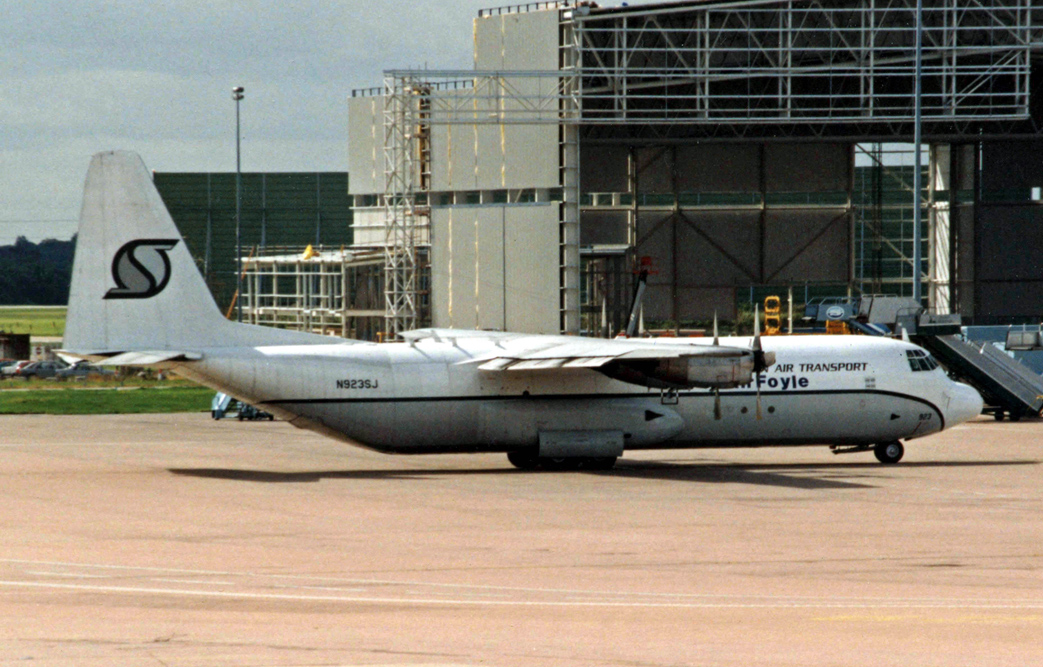
L-100-30 Manchester Airport 1994

SAT operated out of Kenya during the Rwandan Civil War using L-100 Hercules aircraft. They also recruited and tried to recruit Canadian service members and some members of Relief Air Transport, the Canadian airline operating C-46s in Kenya, into their group.

SAT operated out of Asmara, Ethiopia, (now Eritrea), during the Ethiopian famine of the late '80s. It hauled thousands of tons of relief supplies in the middle of a hot war under contracts for the UN, Caritas Internationalis, Lutheran World Federation, and the International Committee of the Red Cross, saving thousands of lives.

SAT was also heavily involved in famine and disaster relief efforts in other areas of Africa. SAT supported the airlift into southern Sudan from the late '80s into the middle '90s. At one time, SAT Hercules aircraft were the sole food supply for the refugee camps in the Juba, Sudan area, during the north–south war. Again, SAT provided food for the helpless and saved countless thousands of lives.

SAT's extensive operations included both offshore and domestic operations and SAT aircraft touched down on all seven continents and in well over a hundred countries. SAT aircraft were based in Papua New Guinea, the U.K, and very commonly in various African countries, as well as other offshore locations, with crews rotating in and out as demand required.

The crews were recruited from both ex-military and civilian-trained personnel. SAT consistently performed challenging tasks on a wide variety of contracts, many in disturbed areas such as Somalia, both prior to and after the Battle of Mogadishu. SAT Hercules aircraft also operated in Angola, Mozambique, Djibouti, Senegal, and the DRC.

SAT's crew training was maintained to high standards. The aircraft were consistently well-maintained, often under the most difficult of circumstances.

Prior to the military cutback during the Clinton administration, SAT supported the U.S. Air Force's Logair cargo system, as well as the U.S. Navy's Quicktrans system, operating much more efficiently than the military could using their own airlift. SAT also flew extensively in Europe and west Asia in support of both the U.S. Air Force and the U.S. Navy, basing out of Ramstein Air Base near Landstuhl, Germany, and RAF Mildenhall in East Anglia, U.K.

SAT carried cargo of all possible description, from hauling newspapers from the U.K. to Ireland at night in winter across the Irish sea, to carrying breeding horses to Brazil. Additionally, SAT was entrusted with King Tutankhamun's treasure. One notable 747 mission involved hauling a load of lions from Amsterdam to Johannesburg, South Africa, the lions being on loan from the Amsterdam Zoo to the Johannesburg Zoo.

SAT Lockheed L-100 Hercules, Boeing 707s, Douglas DC-8s and Boeing 747s served many commercial carriers carrying outsize cargo and hazardous materials. It also performed routine U.S. Embassy supply missions throughout Latin America, covering all of Central and South America, as well as Mexico.

One of SAT's most notable accomplishments was a three-year contract supporting Chevron's drilling operations in the central highlands of Papua New Guinea, operating from a base at Nadzab airport near Lae. Chevron was totally dependent on SAT L-100s, as no roads reached the massive oil recovery operation near Lake Kutubu. Papua New Guinea provides some of the world's most challenging flying conditions, due both to the rapidly changing tropical monsoons that sweep the island nation, and the rugged terrain of the country.

During the Desert Shield and Desert Storm operations, SAT's accomplishments became widely known. Both the company and the participating crew members received performance awards as members of the Civil Reserve Air Fleet from a grateful U.S. Air Force.

=== Relocation to Columbus ===
In 1995, Edmund James, president of James and Donohew Development Services, negotiated with SAT and announced that it was locating to Rickenbacker International Airport in Columbus, Ohio. Much of the Hong Kong-to-Rickenbacker cargo was for Leslie Wexner's The Limited Inc., which was at the time operating under the power of attorney of Jeffrey Epstein. Governor George Voinovich stated: "I am extremely pleased to welcome Southern Air Transport to Ohio, as it will be the first airline to have its world headquarters located at Rickenbacker Airport. This will help Columbus tremendously in becoming a world-class inland port."

In 1996, SAT was the 10th largest all-cargo airline in the world by ton-miles carried.

=== Bankruptcy ===
In late 1998 it tried to merge with other aviation companies, but it filed for bankruptcy on October 1 in Columbus, Ohio - the same day that the CIA Inspector General released a report detailing allegations of Southern Air Transport's involvement in drug trafficking in connection with US-backed and funded right-wing Contras in Nicaragua.

On March 10, 1999, the assets of Southern Air Transport were purchased by Southern Air, and the new carrier began operations in November 1999.

== Fleet ==
December 1966:

- 3 Boeing B-727C
- 3 Curtiss C-46 Commando
- 2 Douglas DC-4
- 3 Douglas DC-6A/B
- 2 Douglas DC-7C

August 1971:

- 2 Boeing B-727C
- 2 Lockheed L-100-20 Hercules
- 1 Lockheed L-100-30 Hercules
- 2 Douglas DC-6A/B

World Airline Fleets 1979 (copyright 1979) shows Southern Air Transport with:

- 2 Lockheed L-100-20 Hercules
- 1 Lockheed L-100-30 Hercules

1987–88 World Airline Fleets (copyright 1987) shows Southern Air Transport with:

- 8 Boeing 707-300C
- 2 Lockheed L-100-20 Hercules
- 6 Lockheed L-100-30 Hercules
- 1 Lockheed L-1329 JetStar II

JP Airline Fleets International 89 (copyright May 1989) shows Southern Air Transport with:

- 6 Boeing 707-300C
- 2 Lockheed L-100-20 Hercules
- 15 Lockheed L-100-30 Hercules
- 1 Lockheed L-1329 JetStar II

January 1998:

- 4 Boeing 747-200F
- 1 Douglas DC-8-71F
- 3 Douglas DC-8-73F
- 15 Lockheed L-100 Hercules

Over the course of its existence, Southern Air Transport operated 23 distinct Lockheed L-100 Hercules aircraft.

== Accidents ==
- 19 July 1953 – Curtiss C-46F-1-CU Commando N1679M inbound from Miami landed short at Dallas Love Field, hit an embankment, bounced, tore off the right wing and flipped over. The two pilots survived but the aircraft was a write off.
- 4 October 1986 – Lockheed L-100-30 Hercules N15ST on an Air Force Logair flight from Kelly Air Force Base in San Antonio, outbound to Warner-Robins Air Force Base in Georgia, stalled shortly after takeoff, crashing back into the base. An unapproved device had been used to lift the elevator out of the way during loading and was not removed before flight, jamming the elevator. The crew of three perished.
- 8 April 1987 – Lockheed L-100-30 Hercules N517SJ at the end of a training flight at Travis Air Force Base, the training captain took control as the aircraft touched down and initiated a go around. Engines 1 and 2 failed to respond, aircraft speed decreased, aircraft gained only a few hundred feet altitude, rolled and crashed, killing all five crew on board. Southern was cited for inadequate maintenance that allowed residue to build up in engine compressors to the point they did not respond. The captain was cited for having chosen to continue the go around when the engines failed to respond and for retracting the flaps.
- 12 August 1990 – Lockheed L-100-30 Hercules N911SJ took off from Juba in what is now South Sudan on a flight to Nairobi. Early in climbout, number 4 engine started to lose power, then engines 1 and 2 developed overspeed and pitch lock issues. On the way back to Juba, engine 3 lost power. The aircraft successfully landed, but overran the runway, colliding with containers and was a write off. The crew of five survived.
- 2 September 1991 – Lockheed L-100-20 Hercules N521SJ was taxiing at Wau in what is now South Sudan and hit a landmine. The crew of five survived but the aircraft was a writeoff.

== See also ==
- Air America
- Intermountain Aviation
- Air Asia
- Civil Air Transport
- Rendition aircraft
- St. Lucia Airways
- Global International Airways
- MarkAir
- Tepper Aviation
- Evergreen International Aviation
- Silk Way Airlines
- Supplemental air carrier
- Uncertificated carrier
- List of defunct airlines of the United States
