= Corporate Air Services HPF821 =

1986 aircraft shootdown

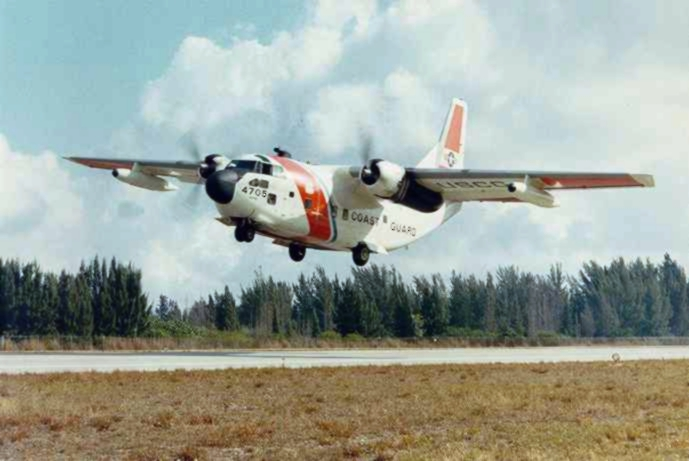
- A Fairchild C-123 owned by the U.S. Coast Guard, photographed in 1971

Incident
- Date: October 5, 1986
- Summary: Shoot-down
- Site: near San Carlos, Río San Juan, Nicaragua

Aircraft
- Aircraft type: Fairchild C-123K
- Operator: Corporate Air Services, owned by Southern Air Transport
- Registration: HPF821 (previously N4410F), ex-USAF 54-679 (c/n 20128)
- Flight origin: Ilopango International Airport, El Salvador
- Destination: Ilopango International Airport, El Salvador
- Passengers: 0
- Crew: 4
- Fatalities: 3
- Injuries: 0
- Survivors: 1

Corporate Air Services HPF821 was a transport aircraft delivering weapons via clandestine airdrop to the Nicaraguan Contras which was shot down over Nicaragua on October 5, 1986, by a surface-to-air missile. Two U.S. pilots, Wallace "Buzz" Sawyer and William Cooper, and the Nicaraguan nationalist radio operator Freddy Vilches died when the Fairchild C-123 Provider was shot down by a Sandinista soldier using an SA-7 shoulder-launched missile, while Eugene Hasenfus, the U.S. "kicker" responsible for pushing the cargo out of the aircraft, survived by parachuting to safety. The aircraft was carrying "60 collapsible AK-47 rifles, 50,000 AK-47 rifle cartridges, several dozen RPG-7 grenade launchers and 150 pairs of jungle boots".

Hasenfus was captured within 24 hours. He was convicted of terrorism-related charges, sentenced to 30 years in prison, and pardoned a month later to return to his family in Wisconsin; at the request of Senator Chris Dodd and others, he was released in exchange for Sandinista soldiers captured by the Contras. Hasenfus's comments about CIA backing for the flights were initially denied by the U.S. government, but investigations of what became known as the Iran-Contra affair showed that the U.S. had organized this and other flights, and had funded the cargo using profits from illegal weapons sales to Iran.

== Background ==
HPF821 was operated by Corporate Air Services, a front for Southern Air Transport, the registered owner of the aircraft. Some of the pilots and crew involved with the Contra supply flights, including Eugene Hasenfus, had been involved in the CIA's aerial supply activities during the Vietnam War, using Air America, Southern Air Transport, and other CIA proprietary airlines. Two Cuban-Americans involved in organising the flights were known to Hasenfus as "Max Gómez" (real name Félix Rodríguez) and "Ramón Medina" (real name Luis Posada Carriles).

== Incident ==
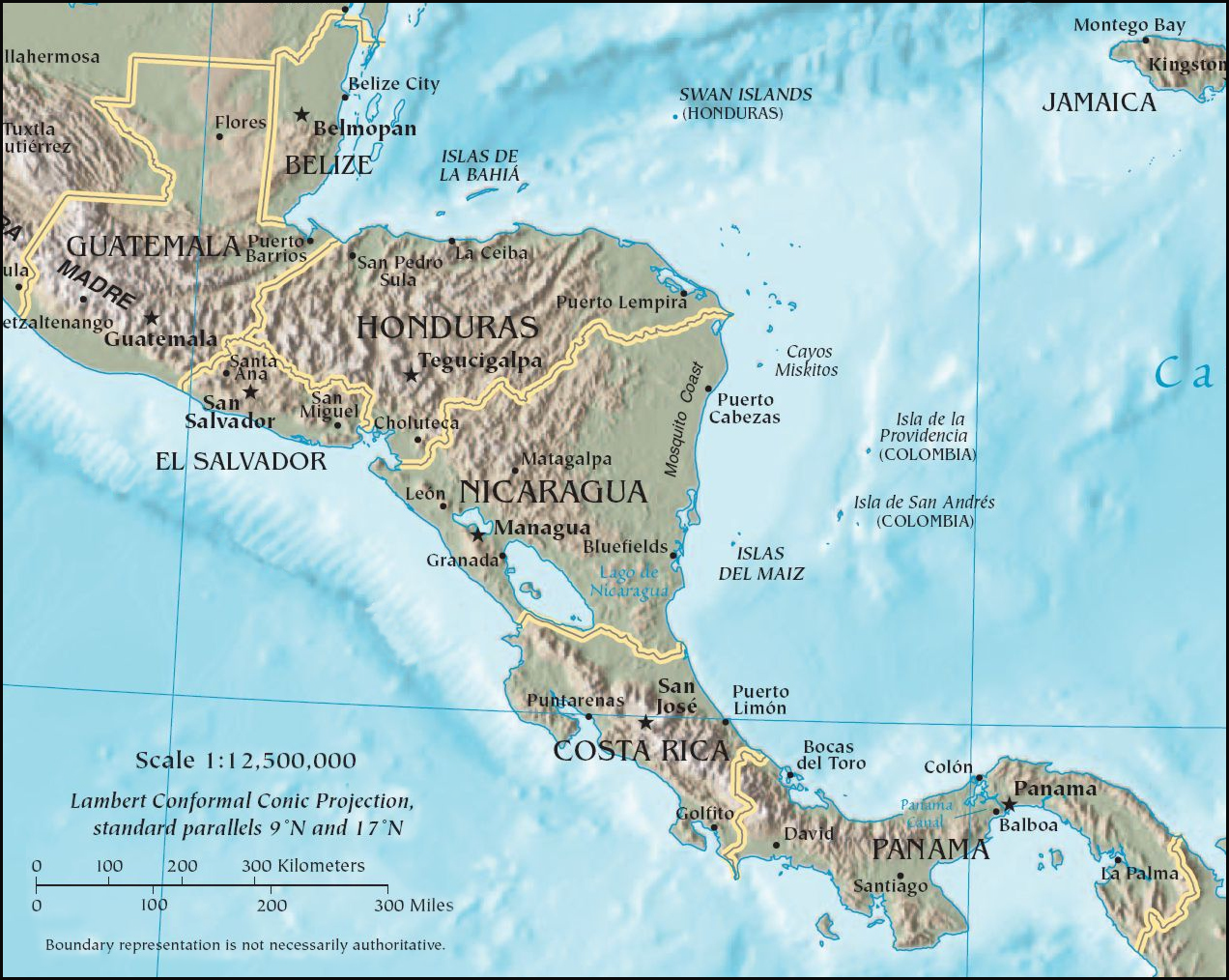
Map of Central America. The aircraft flew from El Salvador along the western coast of Nicaragua to Costa Rica, before turning and entering Nicaraguan airspace near Costa Rica

HPF821 departed from Ilopango International Airport, El Salvador, carrying a cargo of "60 collapsible AK-47 rifles, 50,000 AK-47 rifle cartridges, several dozen RPG-7 grenade launchers and 150 pairs of jungle boots". The aircraft flew along the western coast of Nicaragua to Costa Rica, entering Costa Rica from the northwest. Here, it turned and headed for Nicaragua. After entering Nicaraguan airspace near the border with Costa Rica, the aircraft was maneuvering down towards 2,500 feet in preparation for dropping off its cargo. The young Sandinista soldier named José Fernando Canales Alemán sighted the cargo plane. He fired a Russian-made shoulder mounted SAM-7 (9K32 Strela-2) surface-to-air missile. The aircraft crashed near San Carlos, Río San Juan, killing three of its four crew: William J. Cooper, Wallace "Buzz" Sawyer, and radio operator Freddy Vilches. The fourth, Eugene Hasenfus, parachuted to safety, but was captured within 24 hours. Hasenfus was a former Marine who had previously flown CIA missions in Laos and Vietnam, in the CIA's infamous Air America program.

== Aftermath ==
Hasenfus was captured within 24 hours, and confessed to smuggling weapons. He was sentenced by a Nicaraguan court to 30 years in prison. At the request of Senator Chris Dodd and others investigating the Iran-Contra affair, he was released in exchange for Sandinista soldiers captured by the Contras. Hasenfus was pardoned and released on December 17, and returned to the U.S. with Dodd, in what Nicaraguan President Daniel Ortega described as a "gesture of peace by the people of Nicaragua".

Logbooks retrieved from the wreckage of the aircraft listed various flights with Southern Air Transport personnel.

Hasenfus' capture while delivering weapons and supplies to the right-wing Contra rebels gave the world its first glimpse of the Iran Contra scandal starting to unravel. First the CIA, Pentagon, State Department, and White House – denied any connection to him. The reason was that the US Congress had voted in the "Boland Amendment" to outlaw US-assistance to the Contras – including prohibiting all "funds available to the CIA and the Department of Defense from being used in Nicaragua for military purposes."

Cynthia Arnson, the director of the Latin American Program at the Woodrow Wilson International Center for Scholars, wrote in Crossroads: Congress, the President, and Central America 1976-1993: "Disclosure of the administration's deception in carrying out Nicaragua policy invited Congress to take drastic measures to restore equilibrium between the two branches, if only to reassert the primacy of law in a constitutional government."

== See also ==
- 1981 Armenia mid-air collision
- 1989 Jamba Hercules crash
