= George A. Doole Jr. =

Former CIA agent

- Born: George Arntzen Doole Jr. August 12, 1909; Washington DC
- Died: March 8, 1985 (aged 75)
- Occupations: US Army Air Corps officer; pilot; ran CIA proprietary airline network 1953–1971
- Years active: 50 years
- Known for: Arranging for the escape of the Shah of Iran to Egypt

George Arntzen Doole Jr. (August 12, 1909, Quincy, Illinois – March 8, 1985, Washington, D.C.) was a former U.S. Army Air Corps officer and Pan-Am pilot who ran the CIA's proprietary airline network from 1953 to 1971.

== Education ==
Doole attended the agricultural school at the University of Illinois Urbana-Champaign and earned an MBA from Harvard Business School.

== Career ==
Doole joined the U.S. Army in 1931, where he trained as a pilot in its US Army Air Corps. He became a pilot for Pan-Am in 1934, which included experience flying in Central America between Guatemala and Panama. He served again in the US Army Air Corps during World War II, returning to Pan-Am afterwards. In the late 1940s he left Pan-Am. As a colonel in the Air Force Reserve, Doole was called up for the Korean War in 1951, serving in the Middle East as chief of estimates for Air Force intelligence, serving under Charles P. Cabell, who Doole had known in the Air Corps in the 1930s.

In mid-1953 Doole transferred to the CIA, recruited by Cabell to oversee Civil Air Transport. Although never officially employed by the CIA, Doole was "a legend" in the CIA for his role in creating and managing the agency's proprietary airline network, organized under the Pacific Corporation from 1959. At its mid-1960s peak this included dozens of airlines, including Civil Air Transport and Southern Air Transport, and employed nearly 20,000 people - as many as the CIA itself, and operated around 200 aircraft. Doole so successfully obfuscated the ownership and control of companies and aircraft that even the CIA was unsure precisely how many were involved.

Doole formally retired in 1971, after newspaper investigations and Congressional hearings exposed the network, forcing the CIA to sell it off. Doole remained a director of Evergreen International Aviation, which acquired one of Doole's CIA companies, Intermountain Aviation, in 1975. Doole arranged the 1980 charter flight, on an Evergreen aircraft, which took the Shah of Iran, Mohammad Reza Pahlavi, to Egypt.
