= Eugene Hasenfus =

American alleged CIA operative (1941–2025)

- Born: January 22, 1941; Marinette, Wisconsin, U.S.
- Died: November 26, 2025 (aged 84); Menominee, Michigan, U.S.
- Resting place: Forest Home Cemetery, Marinette, Wisconsin
- Occupations: U.S. Marine and alleged CIA operative

Eugene Haines Hasenfus (January 22, 1941 – November 26, 2025) was a United States Marine who helped fly weapons shipments on behalf of the U.S. government to the right-wing rebel Contras in Nicaragua. The sole survivor after his plane was shot down by the Nicaraguan government in 1986, he was sentenced to 30 years in prison for terrorism and other charges, but pardoned and released the same year. The statements of admission he made to the Sandinista government resulted in a controversy in the U.S. government after the Reagan administration denied any connection to him.

== Early life ==
Eugene Hasenfus was born in Marinette, Wisconsin, on January 22, 1941. He had two brothers and a sister, and he graduated from Marinette High School in 1960. He joined the Marine Corps in May 1960 and spent five years in the corps before receiving an honorable discharge in June 1965. He served as an infantryman and field radio operator, followed by airborne training at Fort Benning. He had a minor police record for offences including speeding and shoplifting. At the time of his capture in 1986, he was married to Sally Hasenfus. In 1986, he lived in Marinette, Wisconsin.

== Contra scandal ==
=== Capture ===
On October 5, 1986, Hasenfus was aboard a Fairchild C-123 cargo plane, N4410F, when it was shot down over Nicaragua by the Sandinista government with a Soviet SA-7 surface-to-air missile. The aircraft was brought down when it was approximately 35 miles (56 km) north of the border with Costa Rica, and a little over 90 miles (140 km) southeast of Managua, Nicaragua's capital and largest city. The plane had been flying weapons to the anti-Sandinista Contra rebels, including 50,000 rifle cartridges for the Soviet-made AK-47, 60 collapsible AK-47s, nearly as many RPG-7s, and 150 pairs of jungle boots. Three members of the flight crew were killed: Hasenfus was the only survivor. The two pilots and a Nicaraguan radio operator died in the crash. Hasenfus had been wearing a parachute, unusual for Central Intelligence Agency (CIA) operatives at the time. Hasenfus managed to dive out of the open cargo hatch of the plane after it was hit by the Nicaraguan missile; he was later captured while sleeping in a makeshift hammock made from his parachute.

=== CIA links ===
After he was captured by the Nicaraguan government, Hasenfus stated at a press conference that he had previously dropped supplies to CIA operatives in Southeast Asia, and that flights into Nicaragua were directly supervised by the CIA. His statement also included his recruitment by a friend in the CIA, an operation based in Ilopango airbase in El Salvador, supported by U.S. army colonel James Steele. The CIA and the U.S. government of Ronald Reagan denied any connection with the flight, although they said they supported any civilian effort to support the Contras. U.S. Secretary of State George Shultz stated that the plane had been paid for by private operators, and that none of the men on it had any connection to the U.S. government.

Hasenfus later repudiated his statement, saying that he was unaware if his fellow workers were employed by the CIA, and that he had only heard rumors to that effect. The men in question, Max Gomez and Ramon Medina, were Cuban Americans. The CIA had at the time been legally forbidden by the U.S. Congress from helping the Contras. Gomez and Medina had been identified as people who had helped organize covert arms supplies to the Contras.

Hasenfus was charged with "terrorism, conspiracy and disturbing public security". Hasenfus stated that he was sure, however, that the operation to supply the Contras with weapons, named Enterprise, was ultimately supervised by the U.S. government. The capture of Hasenfus provided direct evidence of a link between the Contras, and the U.S. government and the Reagan White house; documents found on the dead men linked them to Oliver North.

=== Sentencing and aftermath ===
Hasenfus was tried in Nicaragua, and on November 15, 1986, sentenced to 30 years in prison for terrorism and other charges. His wife Sally made a plea to Nicaraguan president Daniel Ortega for clemency. Nicaraguan defense minister Humberto Ortega (President Ortega’s brother) stated later that the sentence was not directed at Hasenfus himself, but toward the "irrational, unjust policy" of the U.S. government. On December 17, 1986, Hasenfus was pardoned and released by the Nicaraguan government at the request of U.S. Senator Christopher Dodd.

Hasenfus subsequently unsuccessfully sued US Air Force officer Richard Secord, who was involved with organizing weapons shipments to the Contras, Albert Hakim, Southern Air Transport, and Corporate Air Services over issues relating to his capture and trial. The controversy over the flight led U.S. House of Representatives Speaker Tip O'Neill to launch an investigation into the flight. The U.S. press generally suspected that there was more to the story of Hasenfus than the Reagan administration had admitted; according to scholar Scott Armstrong, this had the effect of making them more skeptical of the U.S. government's initial denial of the weapons-for-hostages deal during the Iran-Contra affair.

=== Later life and death ===
Hasenfus continued living in Wisconsin afterwards. In the 2000s, he was repeatedly arrested for indecent exposure. After violating the terms of his probation by exposing himself in a Wal-Mart parking lot in Marinette in 2005, he was imprisoned for several months at the Green Bay Correctional Institution. He was released on the 19th anniversary of his release by Nicaragua.

Hasenfus died of cancer at his home in Menominee, Michigan, on November 26, 2025, at the age of 84.
