= Intermountain Aviation =

CIA-owned US airline sold to Evergreen (1961–1975)

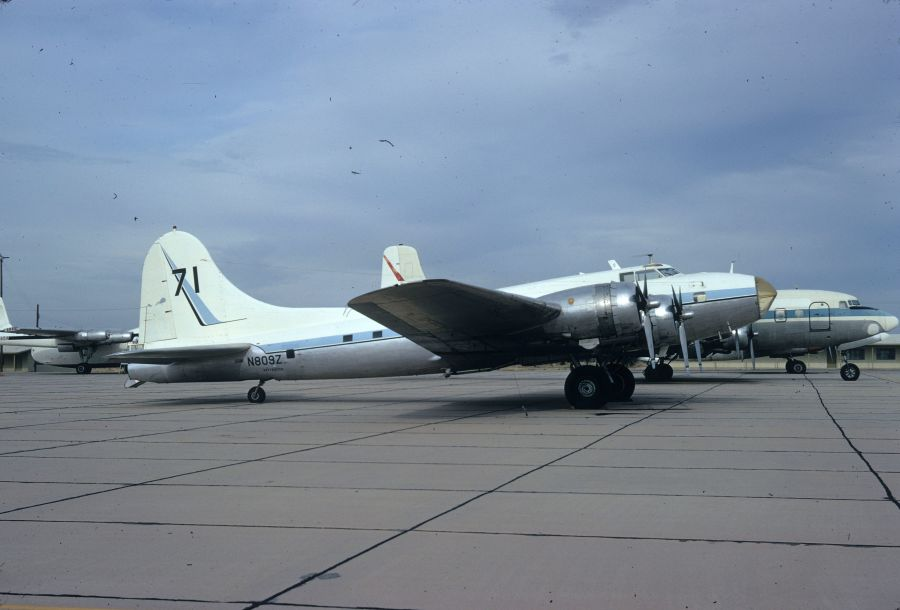
- Boeing B-17G Marana Air Park 1971
- Founded: September 25, 1961
- Ceased operations: February 28, 1975
- Operating bases: Marana Air Park
- Fleet size: See Fleet
- Parent company: Central Intelligence Agency via Pan Aero Investments
- Headquarters: Marana, Arizona
- Key people: Gar Thorsrud
- Employees: 225 (January 1968)

Intermountain Aviation was a US airline established in 1961 and secretly owned by the Central Intelligence Agency (CIA). Intermountain's non-CIA business included flying smokejumpers for the United States Forest Service (USFS), flying freight (including to places like Alaska's North Slope), restocking fish by air, and similar activities. But from the mid-1960s to the peak of the Vietnam War, CIA business accounted for 60–70% of the company's operations, and Intermountain was one of the three largest CIA "proprietary" companies, along with Air America and the CIA's insurance activities. Intermountain had its own airport and maintenance base at Marana, Arizona, near Tucscon, known today as Pinal Airpark but then as Marana Air Park. Intermountain was authorized to conduct maintenance of any kind on any type of aircraft. The airline was a commercial operator, also known as an uncertificated carrier, authorized to operate large aircraft, but not as a common carrier (i.e., operating on a contract basis only) and thus escaped most oversight by the Civil Aeronautics Board (CAB), the now defunct Federal agency that, at the time, tightly regulated almost all US commercial air transport.

In 1972, the CIA decided to reduce aviation activities, leading it to sell Intermountain in stages, beginning with its commercial airline activities in 1973 (to Rosenbalm Aviation). In June 1974, CIA ownership was revealed; the CIA had earlier denied any involvement. Evergreen Helicopters bought the remaining Intermountain assets in early 1975, merging them with Montana-based CAB-certificated Johnson Flying Service, which it bought in the same year, forming Evergreen International Airlines (EIA). EIA ceased operations in 2013.

Intermountain's overt capabilities can be seen in a marketing film. See External links.

An indirect legacy of the company is Sierra Pacific Airlines, a small Tucson-based charter airline owned for many years by the former Intermountain president, Gar Thorsrud. Sierra Pacific also flies for the USFS with a similar pale blue and black livery to Intermountain.

== History ==
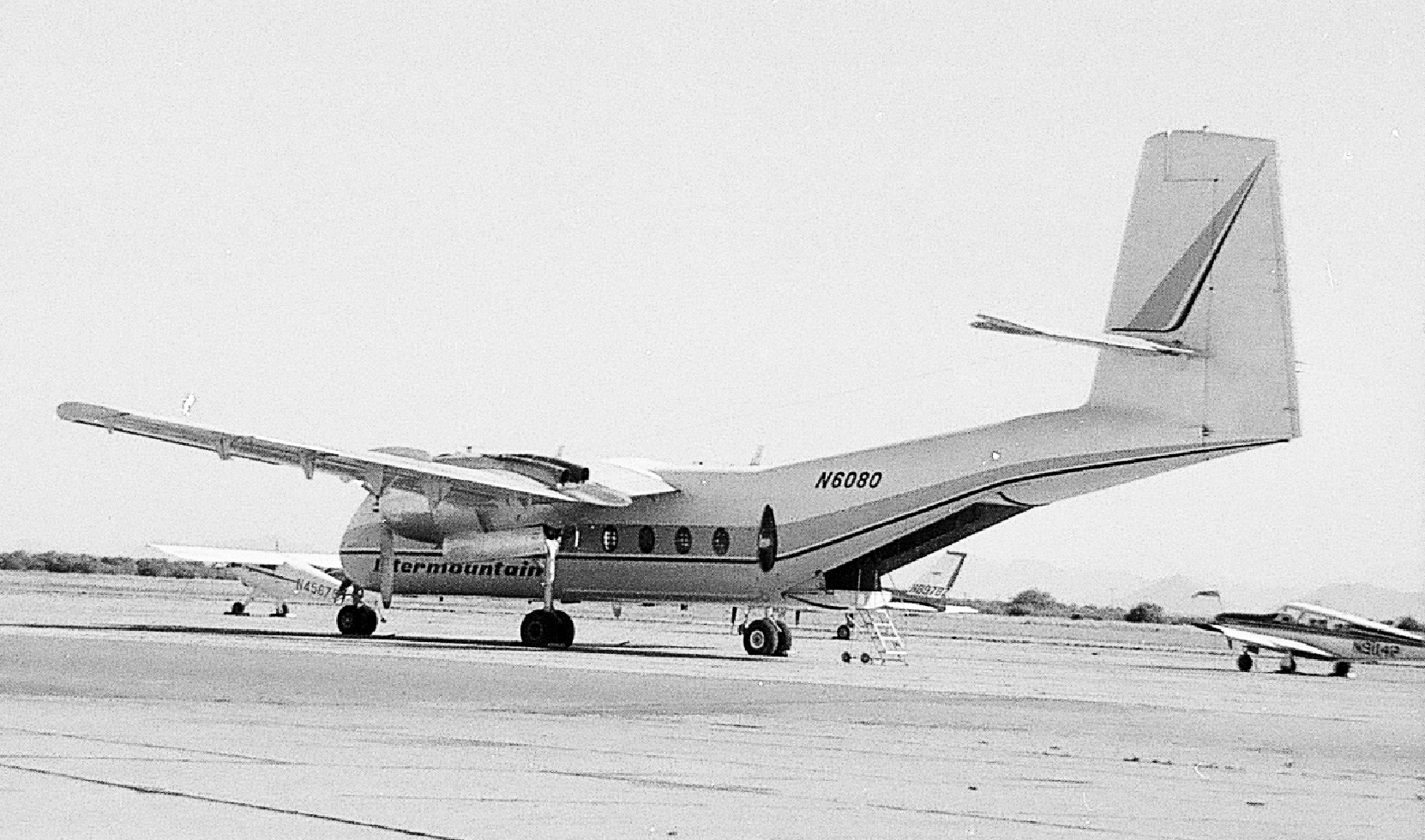
DHC-4 Caribou Marana Air Park August 1973

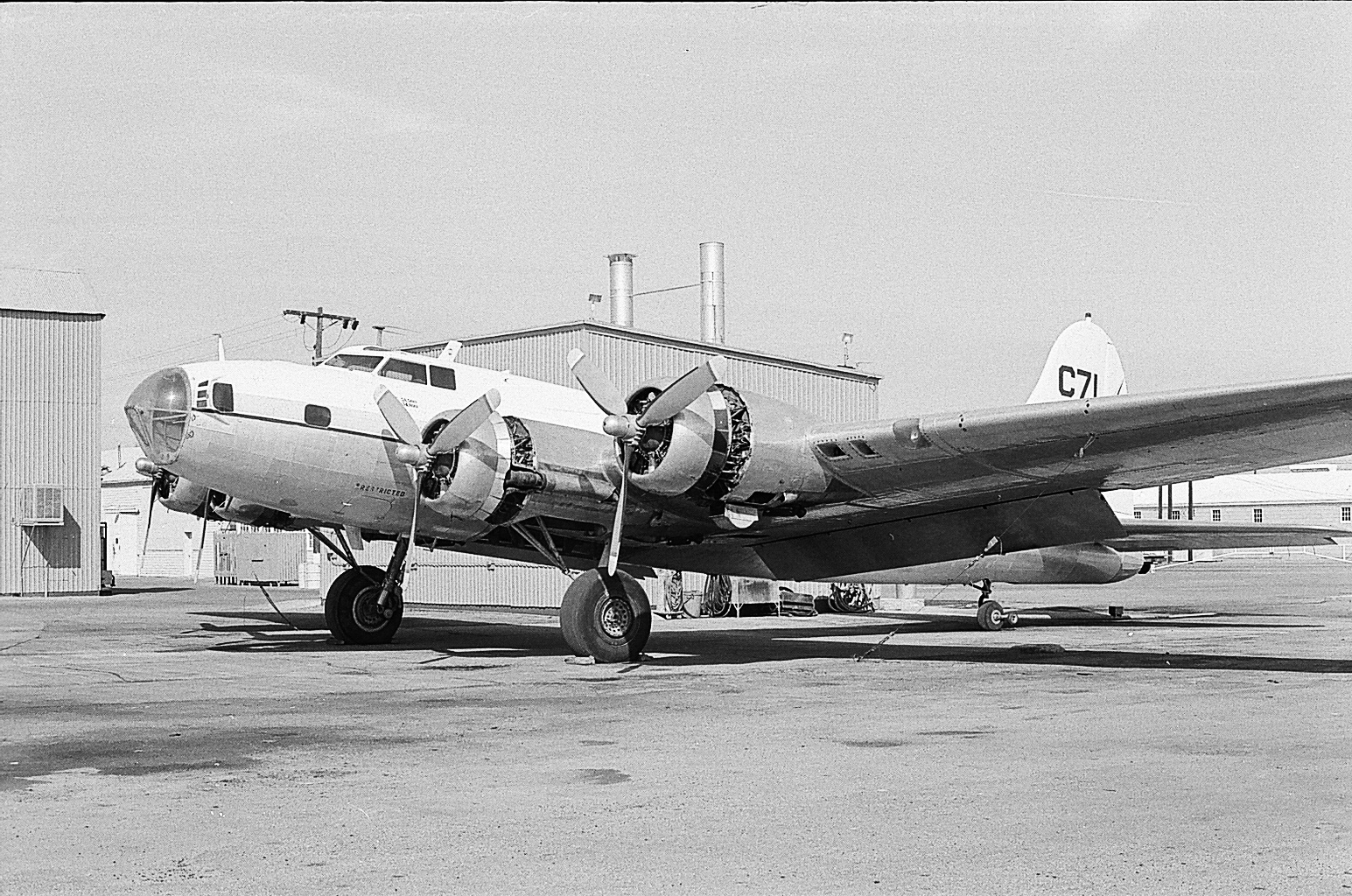
Boeing B-17G used in Project Coldfeet

=== Startup and expansion ===
The former Marana Air Base in Marana, Arizona, northwest of Tucson, became Marana Air Park (today's Pinal Airpark) in late 1960 when Sonora Flying Service (SFS), a fire-fighting firm employed by the United States Forest Service (USFS), took a 10 year lease. SFS turned part of the Air Park into a resort, with a motel, one of the largest swimming pools in the area, a restaurant and so forth. Its fleet included a B-17, a B-25, two PBYs and a C-45. Robert E. Roberts, head of SFS, was selected by the CIA to be the front man for Intermountain Aviation for its first three years. Intermountain was organized in Phoenix on 25 September 1961 and moved to the Air Park early in 1962, but was, in actuality, run by Garfield "Gar" Thorsrud, a former USFS smokejumper. The nominal parent organization of Intermountain was Pan Aero Investments.

Intermountain's security approach was "hide in plain sight," and Marana Air Park was open to the public. Intermountain promoted its overt activities, such as parachute demonstrations including mass HALO jumps at which spectators were encouraged to take photos, demonstrations of the Fulton Skyhook and its use to recover the body of a dead scientist from the Arctic in 1963, flying smokejumpers and similar activities such as restocking fish in lakes and reservoirs by air. Marana Air Park hosted the national championships of the United States Parachute Association in the late 1960s and in 1969, CBS TV filmed a parachute segment at the Air Park for a TV special celebrating the 50th year of professional football. Intermountain made a marketing film (see External links) show-casing its operations in support of oil exploration in Alaska's North Slope and its STOL and helicopter activities. Less public but disclosed in a 1973 CAB proceeding were providing transportation for McDonnell Douglas between Los Angeles and the Atomic Test Center and for Boeing between Seattle and a test facility at Alamagordo, New Mexico (Boeing tested nuclear missiles at White Sands Missile Range). However, from mid-1960s through the "peak of the Vietnam," 60–70% of Intermountain's operations were for the CIA (see Covert activities below). Intermountain was one of the three largest CIA-owned companies (known as "proprietaries") of the time, along with Air America and CIA-owned insurance activities.

=== Wind-down and revelation of CIA ownership ===
In the 1970s, government business "dwindled to nothing." In 1972, referencing an effort to "eliminate the substantial dependence on a small group of government contractors for subcontracts in the field of research and development," Intermountain expanded into transporting auto parts for Big Three automakers in Detroit, devoting six commercial aircraft to this. Intermountain also entered the aircraft storage business. Widebody aircraft deliveries were forcing retirements of first generation jet aircraft. By the end of 1972, there were over 40 large commercial aircraft at the Air Park. Intermountain also advertised the Air Park as a location for corporate training, seminars, banquets, fly-ins, conventions, etc, noting accommodation for up to 225 (motel and dormitory style), a restaurant, bar, heated pool and other activities.

However, in 1972 the CIA also decided to reduce aviation activities, specifically to exit Air America and Southern Air Transport (SAT). SAT was CAB-certificated and therefore sale required a CAB proceeding. The CAB process resulted in SAT's CIA-ownership, already rumored, becoming widely reported in August/September 1973 after other airlines complained about competing with a government financed company. In November, Intermountain sold its Detroit auto parts transportation business to Rosenbalm Aviation, including most of its commercial fleet. See Fleet for the impact to Intermountain's commercial fleet from year-end 1972 to year-end 1973.

In August 1970, an anonymous Tucson police official said the local crash of a small aircraft connected to Intermountain was part of a CIA operation. The office of CIA director Richard Helms issued a denial, noting that the CIA "did not operate within the United States." But in June 1974, a former CIA employee published a best-selling book identifying Intermountain as a CIA proprietary airline and Arizona Congressman Mo Udall confirmed it.

=== Sale and legacy ===
On February 28, 1975, Intermountain ceased operating with the sale of its assets to Evergreen Helicopters. Later that year, Evergreen bought another airline, Johnson Flying Service, which was CAB-certificated. The two together formed Evergreen International Airlines, which operated until 2013. Evergreen was connected to the CIA; a board member was George A. Doole Jr., who had headed the parent organization of CIA airlines, Pacific Corporation. Intermountain president Gar Thorsrud was let go by Evergreen in June 1975. He founded Mountain West Aviation, which bought the small carrier Sierra Pacific Airlines in 1978, which he ran until his death in 2014. Tucson-based Sierra Pacific is also a USFS contractor and uses similar pale-blue and black colors as Intermountain.

Pinal Airpark remains a noted commercial aircraft storage location.

== Covert activities ==
An attraction of Marana to the CIA was nearby Davis-Monthan Air Force Base, an extensive military aircraft storage site. This provided the Air Park with a ready supply of raw material, aircraft to be sourced and/or modified for CIA purposes. Intermountain had FAA authority to perform any kind of maintenance on any type of aircraft. Examples of covert Intermountain activities included:

- Project Coldfeet, the acquisition of information from an abandoned Soviet drift station in the Arctic Ocean by Intermountain's B-17G bomber (see nearby photos), which recovered documents, artifacts and the US agents who parachuted onto to the ice station days before with the Fulton Skyhook. The Air Park was the site of experiments in the use of the Skyhook which refined the concept before use in Coldfeet. The Skyhook was later adapted to the Lockheed C-130 Hercules and used to recover agents from North Vietnam. The Skyhook (and B-17) famously also featured at the end of the 1965 James Bond movie Thunderball.
- Supplying aircraft (T-28s and B-26Ks) and trained pilots to fly against the Simba rebellion in Republic of the Congo in the mid 1960s.
- Facilitating provision of B-26 bombers to Portugal for use in its colonial wars, notwithstanding an arms embargo to which the US was a party.
- Operating classified contracts for the United States Air Force, the Atomic Energy Commission, the Office of Naval Research, Department of Defense and the United States Army.
- Operation of aircraft such as the T-28, C-46, Caribou and Pilatus PC-6 Porter; US use of such aircraft in Southeast Asia was "not coincidental."

== Intermountain Air Service ==
Intermountain Air Service was a sister company to Intermountain Aviation under common ownership/management authorized in 1973 to be an air taxi (also known as a commuter carrier) with DHC-6 Twin Otters.

== Fleet ==
The below shows the large commercial aircraft fleet of Intermountain. In addition, the carrier flew such aircraft as the B-17G, T-28 Trojan, de Havilland Canada DHC-6 Twin Otters, de Havilland Canada DHC-4 Caribou and Pilatus PC-6 Porter as well as helicopters.

31 December 1963:

- 1 Curtiss C-46

31 December 1967:

- 2 Curtiss C-46
- 1 Douglas DC-6

31 December 1972:

- 5 Curtiss C-46
- 1 Douglas DC-6
- 1 Lockheed L-188 Electra

31 December 1973:

- 1 Curtiss C-46
- 1 Lockheed L-188 Electra

== See also ==
- List of defunct airlines of the United States
- Air America
- Pinal Airpark
- Southern Air Transport
- Johnson Flying Service
- Evergreen International Aviation
- Evergreen International Airlines
- Rosenbalm Aviation
