= Pinal Airpark =

Airport in Pinal County, Arizona

Pinal Airpark Marana Army Airfield
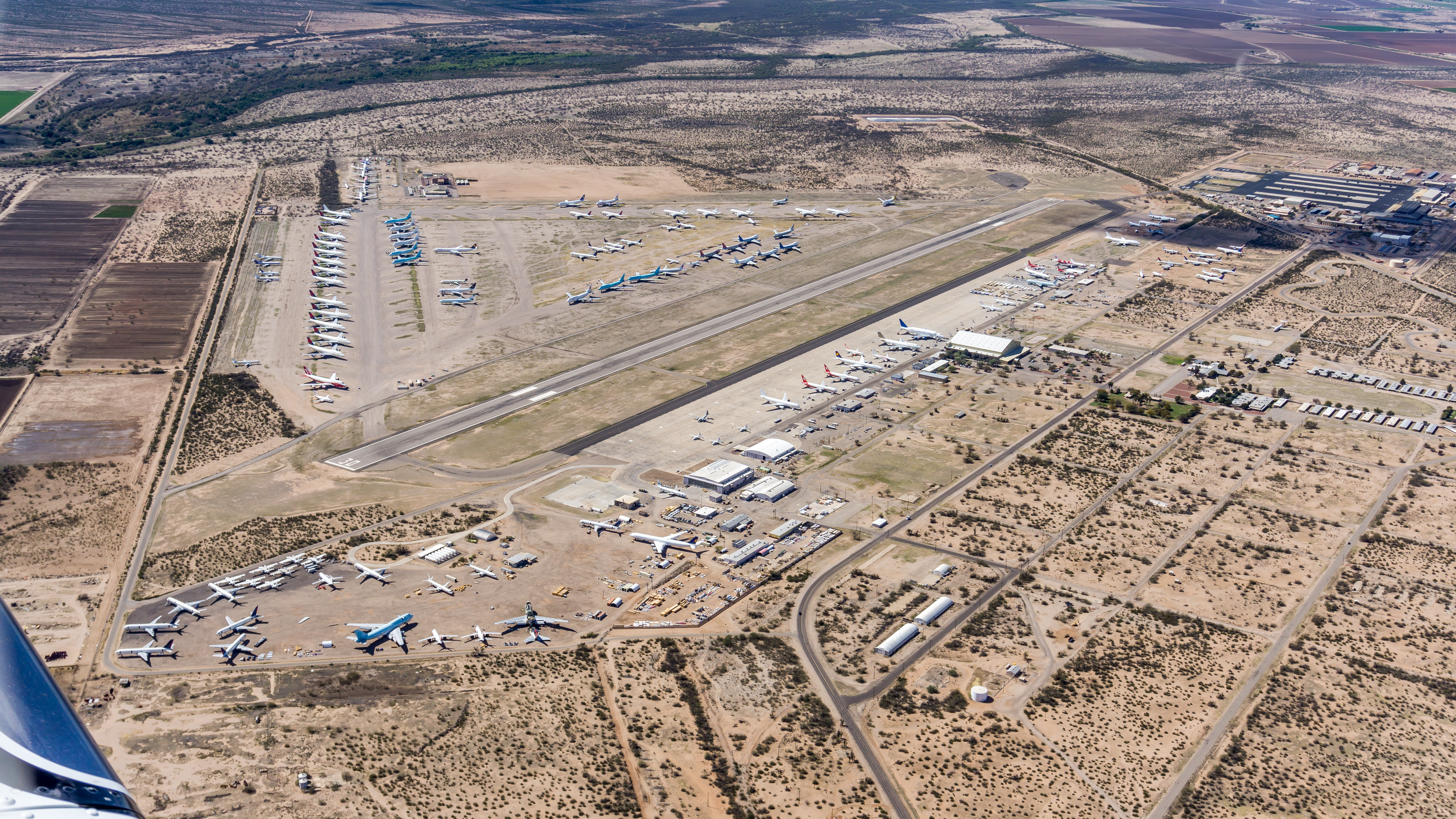
- Overflight of Pinal Airpark (center) and Silverbell Army Heliport (right) in 2018
- IATA: MZJ; ICAO: KMZJ; FAA LID: MZJ

Summary
- Airport type: Public
- Owner: Pinal County
- Serves: Marana, Arizona
- Built: 1942
- Elevation AMSL: 1,893 ft (577 m)
- Coordinates: 32°30′35″N 111°19′31″W
- Website: www.pinalcountyairpark.com

Map
- Location of Pinal Airpark KMZJ (the United States)

Runways
Direction	Length		Surface
Direction	ft	m	Surface
12/30	6,849	2,088	Asphalt

Statistics (2020)
- Aircraft operations (year ending April 1): 58,200
- Source: US Federal Aviation Administration

Silver Bell Army Heliport
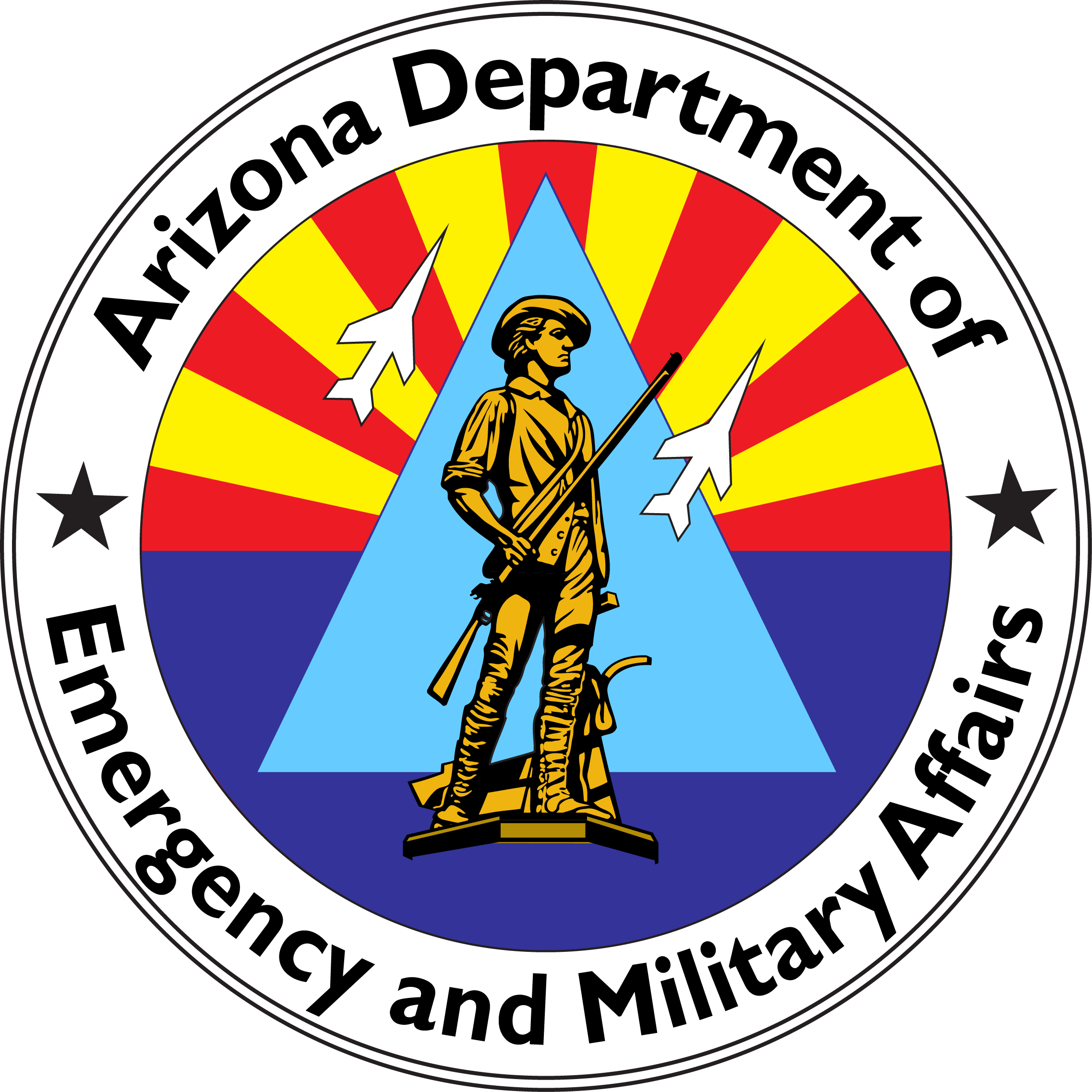

Site information
- Type: US Army heliport
- Owner: Department of Defense
- Operator: Arizona Army National Guard
- Condition: Operational

Site history
- In use: 1986 – present

Garrison information
- Garrison: 98th Aviation Troop Command
- Occupants: 1st Battalion (Attack Reconnaissance), 285th Aviation Regiment; 2nd Battalion (Assault Helicopter), 285th Aviation Regiment

Airfield information
- Identifiers: FAA LID: 02AZ
- Elevation: 1,868.6 feet (570 m) AMSL
Helipads
Number	Length and surface
H1	100 feet (30 m) asphalt
H2	100 feet (30 m) asphalt
H3	100 feet (30 m) asphalt
H4	165 feet (50 m) asphalt

Pinal Airpark (IATA: MZJ, ICAO: KMZJ, FAA LID: MZJ), also known as Pinal County Airpark, is a non-towered, county-owned, public-use airport located 8 miles (7.0 nmi; 13 km) northwest of the central business district of Marana, in Pinal County, Arizona, United States. Silverbell Army Heliport (FAA LID: 02AZ) is co-located with Pinal Airpark. The heliport is a private-use military facility operated by the Arizona Army National Guard.

Pinal Airpark's primary function is to serve as a boneyard for civilian commercial aircraft, where the area's dry desert climate mitigates corrosion of the aircraft. It is the largest commercial aircraft storage and heavy maintenance facility in the world. Even so, many aircraft which are brought here wind up being scrapped. Nearby the 309th Aerospace Maintenance and Regeneration Group at Davis-Monthan Air Force Base provides the same service to the United States federal government.

Aircraft at Pinal Airpark include those formerly operated by Cathay Dragon, Cathay Pacific, Delta Air Lines, Northwest Airlines, Aerosur, Hellenic, Surinam Airways, Spirit Airlines, and other carriers.

== History ==
Built in 1942 by the Sundt and Del Webb Construction Companies and opened in March 1943, the facility was known as Marana Army Air Field. During World War II, the airfield was under the command of the 389th Army Air Force Base Unit, AAF West Coast Training Center and used as a training base, as part of the 50,000 Pilot Training Program.

Marana conducted basic flight training and the training of transport pilots in instrument flying and navigation, being the home of the 3024th (Pilot School, Basic). Chinese pilots were also trained there. Five satellite airfields were established for Marana during World War II:

- Picacho Field Aux #1 (currently Picacho Stagefield ARNG Heliport (ICAO: KPCA))
- Rillito Field Aux #2 (currently reused as Marana Regional Airport (IATA: AVW, ICAO: KAVQ))
- Coronado Field Aux #3
- Avra Field Aux #4
- Sahuaro Field Aux #5 (currently El Tiro Gliderport (FAA LID: AZ67))

The infrastructure installed at Marana during World War II was extensive. This included water, sewer, and gas systems that were still used until some problems developed in the 1990s. There was a massive storm drain system. The airfield had a railroad spur line and railroad station.

Marana closed after World War II. In 1948, after the establishment of the U.S. Air Force as an independent service, Pinal County accepted a deed to the property, subsequent to the Air Force's disposal of most of the buildings, waterlines, gas lines, and electrical lines. From 1948 to 1951, Pinal County leased the property to multiple tenants, and from 1951 to 1956, Marana was reused as a contractor-operated USAF basic flying school, operated by Darr Aeronautical Technical Company.

Marana became the headquarters of all Central Intelligence Agency air operations during the Vietnam War years, when it was the primary facility of Intermountain Aviation, a wholly owned CIA "front" company which was used to supply covert operations in Southeast Asia and elsewhere. Intermountain was infamous for its thinly veiled CIA special ops which included development and use of the Fulton Skyhook, but its cover was its non-scheduled freight and maintenance operations. Marana was the principal continental United States maintenance base for Southeast Asia CIA operations including Air America and Continental Air Services. The Marana facility was subsequently acquired by the closely Agency-linked Evergreen International Airlines, which performed aircraft modification and maintenance at the airfield.

Marana Air Park first became a storage site for commercial aircraft in 1972 as part of a diversification strategy by Intermountain. By the end of the year, in part due to retirements of narrowbody jet aircraft driven by new widebody aircraft, over 40 large commercial aircraft were stored from Pan Am, Universal, Allegheny Airlines and Hughes Tool (which at the time owned Hughes Airwest).

== Current usage ==
=== Pinal Airport ===
The airport is home to many private companies including: Ascent Aviation Services and Jet Yard Solutions, Aircraft Demolition, and Jet Yard.

Since the early 2010s, airport economic development director Jim Petty has opened the facility to the public, giving free tours of the airport and the airplanes stored there.

=== Silverbell Army Heliport ===
Pinal Airpark is co-located with Silverbell Army Heliport (SAHP). The 98th Aviation Troop Command, the Western Army National Guard Aviation Training Site (WAATS) and other numerous Army National Guard units are located inside SAHP. WAATS discontinued training of the AH-64 Apache attack helicopter at the site in 2012. Currently WAATS provides training for the UH-72A Lakota.

Pinal Airpark and SAHP also hosts the US Special Operations Command's Parachute Training and Testing Facility. On 28 March 2013, Navy SEAL Brett Shadle was killed during parachute training here and another SEAL was injured.

== Facilities and aircraft ==
Pinal Airpark covers an area of 1,508 acres (610 ha) at an elevation of 1,893 feet (577 m) above mean sea level. It has one runway designated 12/30 with an asphalt surface measuring 6,849 by 150 feet (2,088 by 46 m). Silverbell Army Heliport has four helipads, three measuring 100 by 100 feet (30 by 30 m), and the fourth measuring 165 by 165 feet (50 by 50 m). For the 12-month period ending 1 April 2020, the airport had 58,200 aircraft operations, an average of 159 per day: 86% military and 14% general aviation.

=== Notable aircraft ===
One of the notable aircraft assigned to Marana during its CIA years was a Boeing B-17G Flying Fortress, AAF Serial 44–85531. As of September 1957, the aircraft was registered to Western Enterprises Inc., a paramilitary front company founded by the CIA in 1951 for operations in Taiwan. In late 1957, missions were staged from Kurmitola Air Field in East Pakistan (now Bangladesh) to parachute agents into Tibet. The aircraft was disassembled for parts at Clark Air Base, Philippines between March and October 1958, and it is believed that this plane was eventually scrapped. The serial number 44-85531 appeared again as registered on another B-17G, 1 September 1960 registered to Atlantic General Enterprise, Washington DC (another CIA front) as N809Z. These registration numbers were then changed to the true numbers of 44–83785. Based again at Marana, this aircraft later flew black operations over Vietnam and was used to retrieve two American agents from an abandoned Soviet scientific base in the Arctic using the Fulton Skyhook in Operation Coldfeet.

== Gallery ==
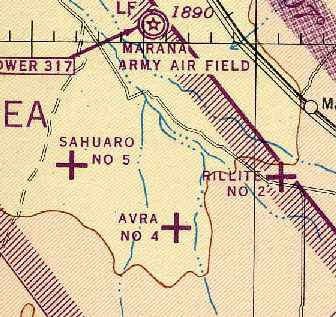
1945 Phoenix Sectional Chart showing Marana Army Air Field and Marana Auxiliary Army Airfield No. 2, No. 4, No. 5

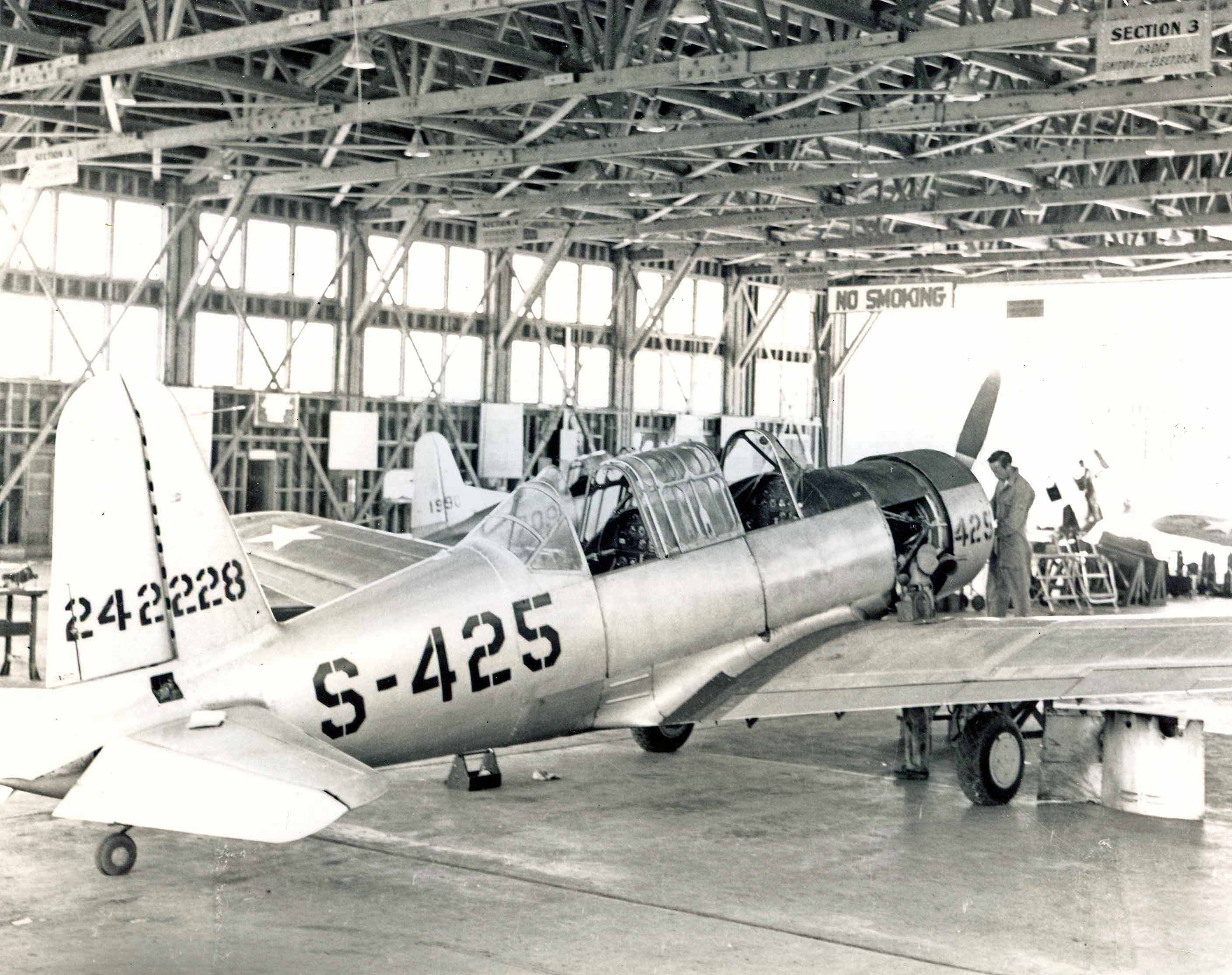
Vultee BT-13 Valiant in hangar at Marana AAF

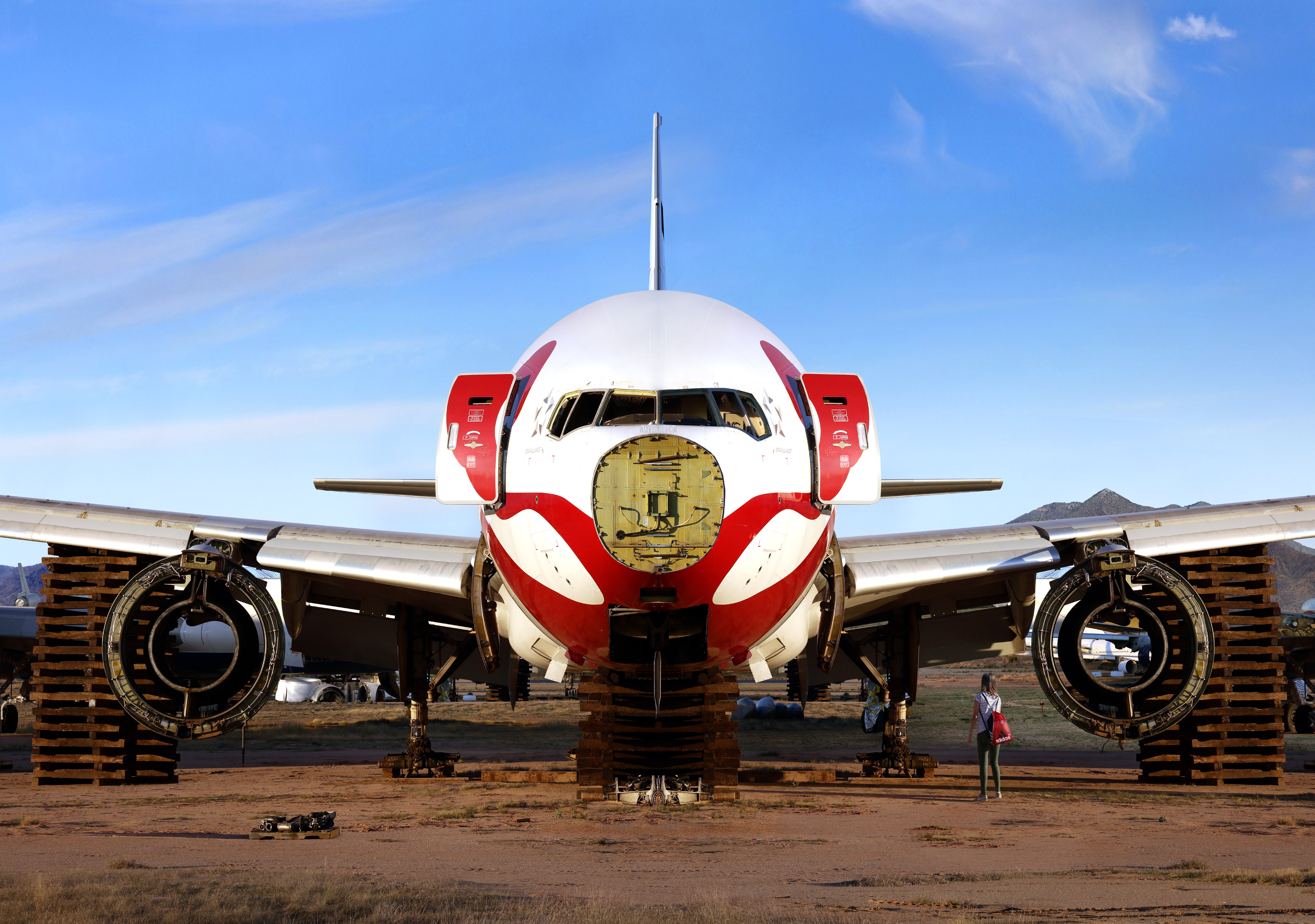
Boeing 777-200 salvage, Pinal Air Park, 2018

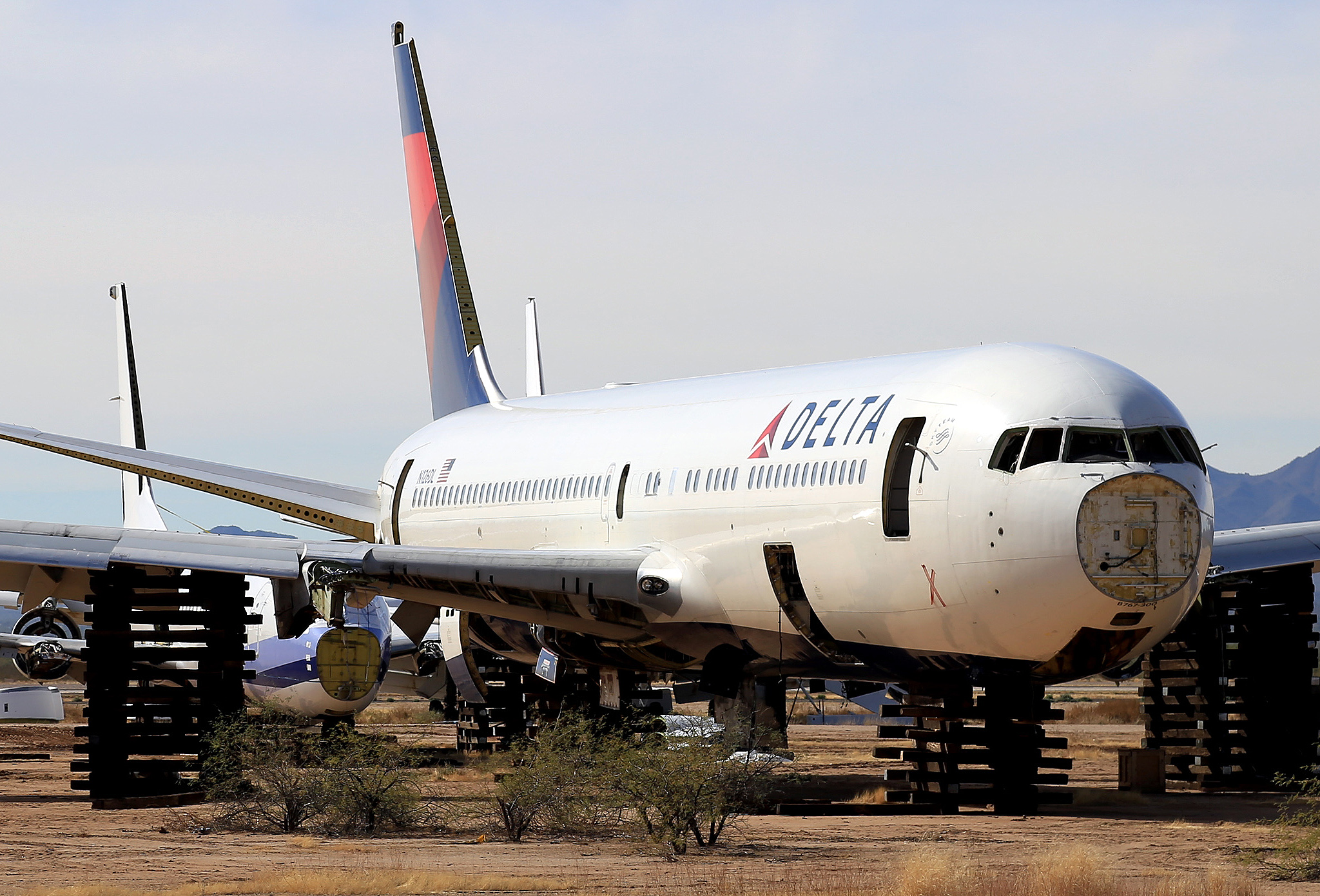
A Boeing 767-300 formerly operated by Delta Air Lines being disassembled for parts at Pinal Airpark

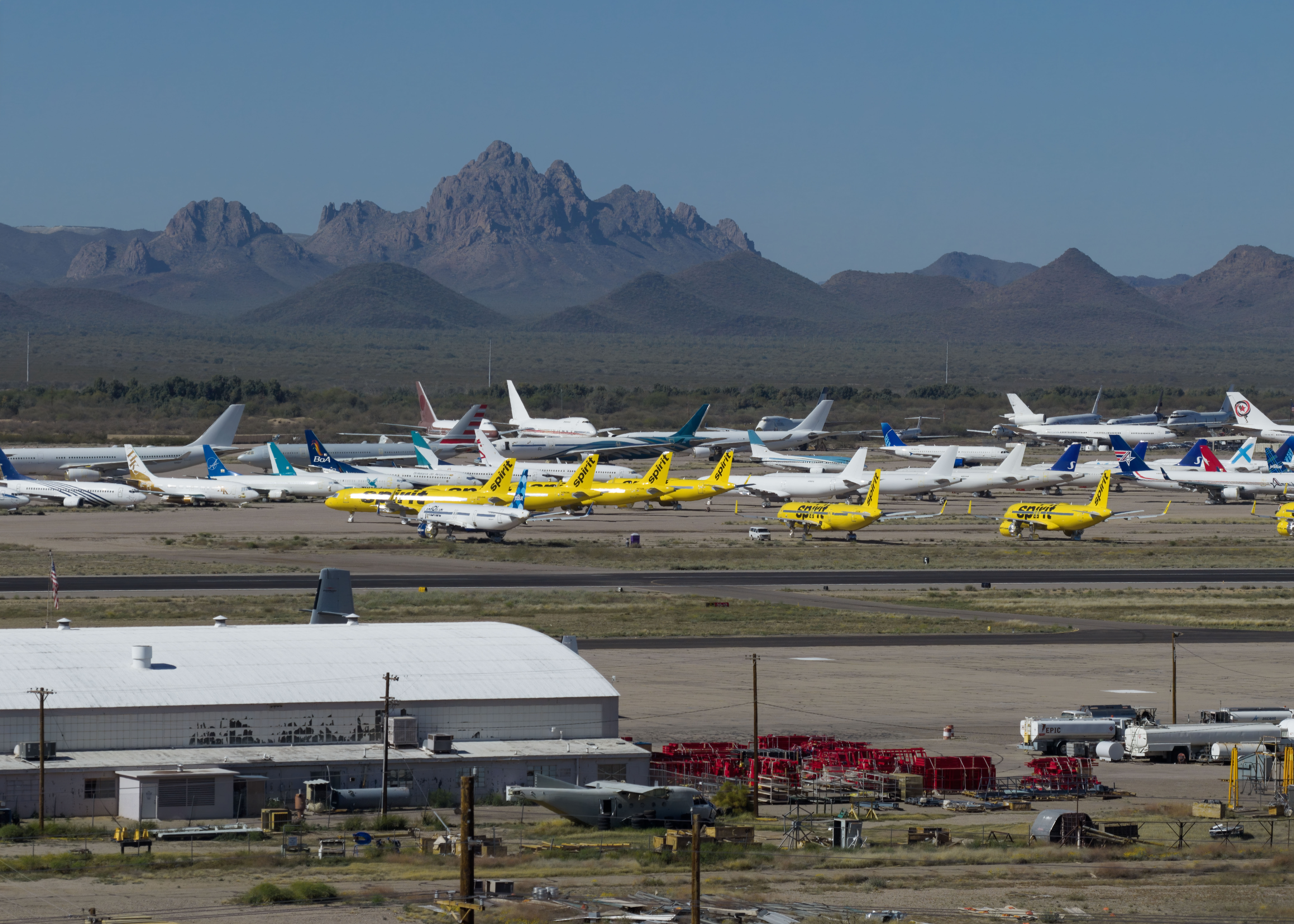
View of stored commercial aircraft

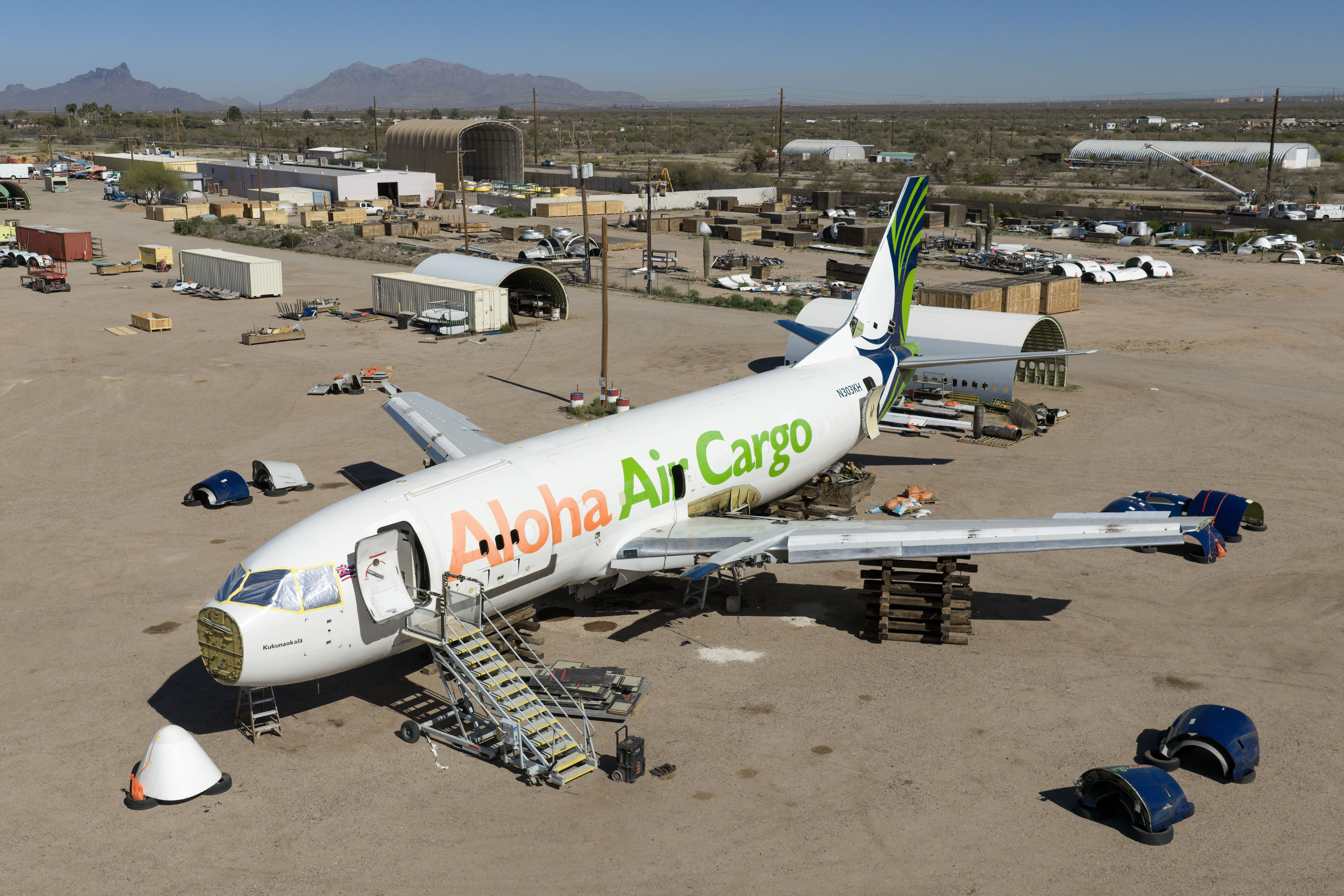
A Boeing 737-300F formerly operated by Aloha Air Cargo being repaired at Pinal Airport

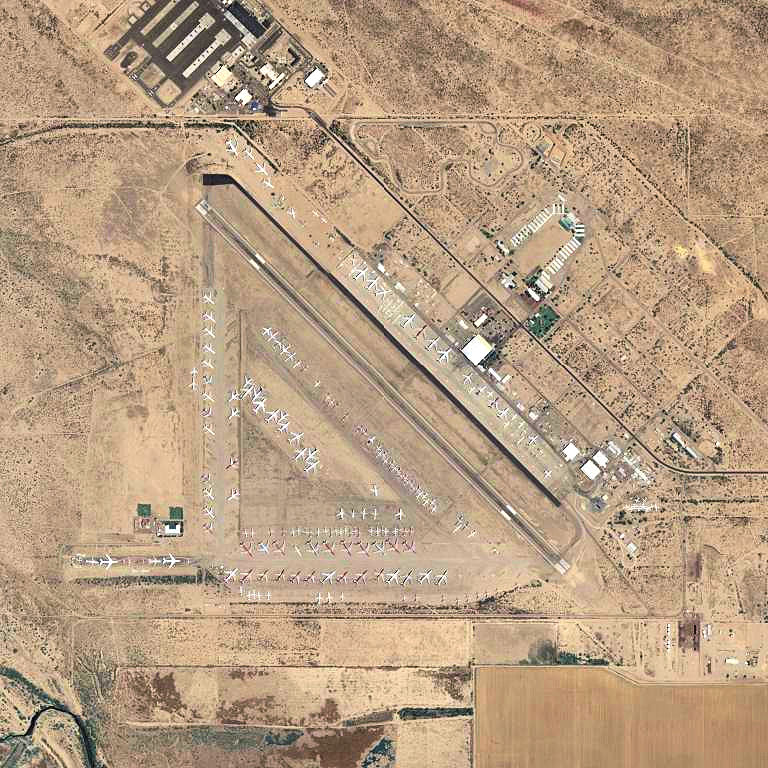
2006 USGS aerial image

== See also ==
- Arizona World War II Army Airfields
- 37th Flying Training Wing (World War II)
- Pacific Corporation
- List of airports in Arizona

== Other sources ==
- This article incorporates public domain material from the Air Force Historical Research Agency
- Manning, Thomas A. (2005), History of Air Education and Training Command, 1942–2002. Office of History and Research, Headquarters, AETC, Randolph AFB, Texas OCLC 71006954, 29991467
- Shaw, Frederick J. (2004), Locating Air Force Base Sites, History’s Legacy, Air Force History and Museums Program, United States Air Force, Washington DC OCLC 57007862, 1050653629
