= Air Asia (Taiwan) =

Taiwanese aircraft MRO provider

Air Asia Company Limited (Chinese: 亞洲航空股份有限公司) is a provider of aircraft maintenance, repair and overhaul (MRO) services headquartered in Taiwan. It is now located in the Tainan Airport. It is the only surviving member of the Pacific Corporation, but currently it is owned by Taiwan Aerospace Corporation and is no longer related to the Central Intelligence Agency.

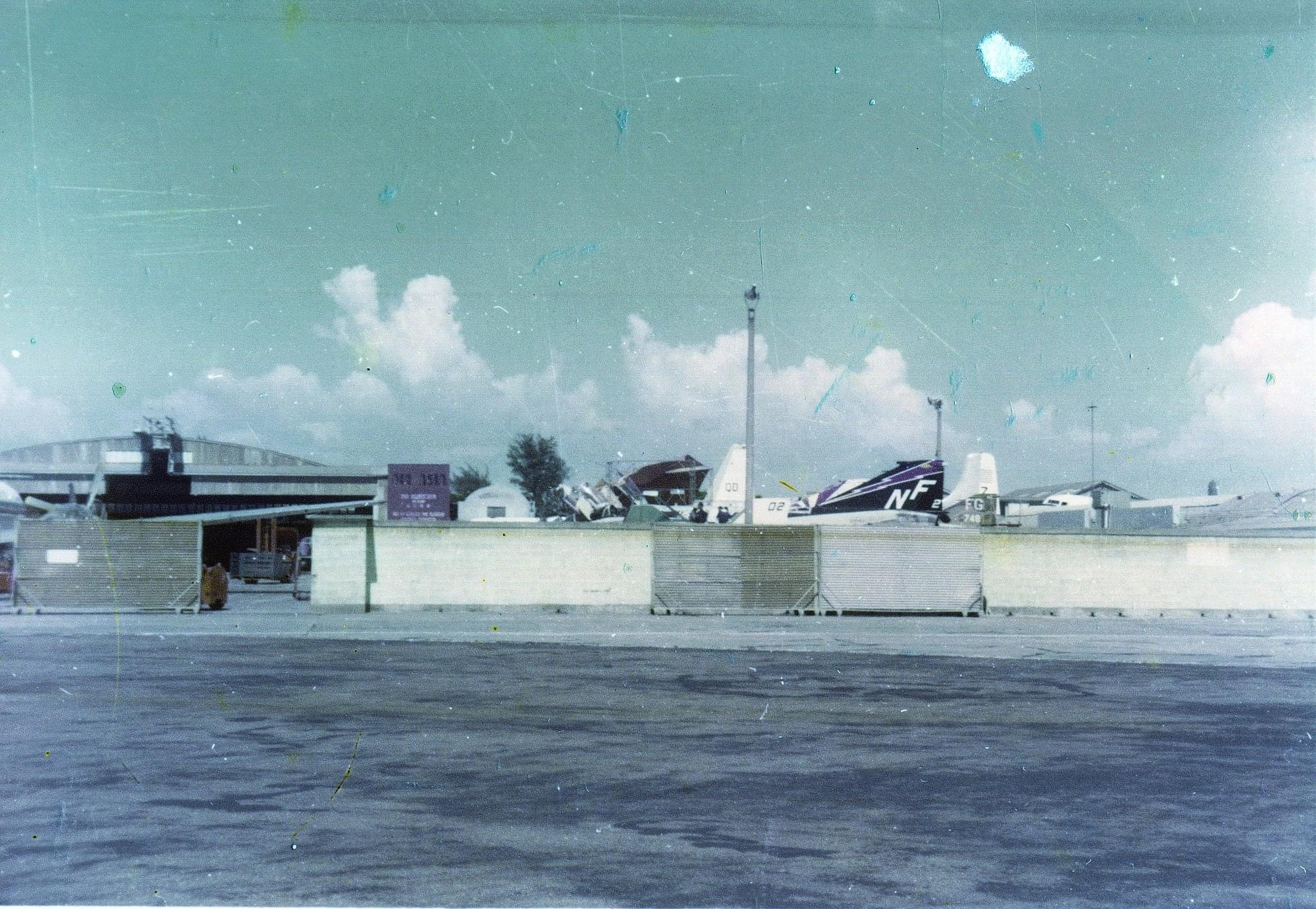
Tainan AB, circa 1973, Air Asia. Where they refurbed USAF, USN, USMC air craft.

== History ==
Air Asia was created out of Civil Air Transport (CAT) in 1955 as Air America's aircraft service unit.

In 1949, CAT, in order to prepare for the ROC government's evacuation from the mainland, bought two ships to house all aircraft maintenance equipment and parts to evacuate to Taiwan. From 1949 to 1962, these two ships were docked in Kaohsiung, and the aircraft to be serviced had to land at Tainan Airport, its parts of concern dismounted, transferred to the two ships for repair, and then brought back to the airport to remount it on the aircraft. It was only until 1962 when its current location was opened, and aircraft can be serviced directly at the airport.

In February 1975, it was sold to E-Systems, and in 1987 transferred to Precision Airmotive. Taiwan Aerospace Corporation (TAC) acquired Air Asia in 1994.

== Work ==
Air Asia works on the maintenance and inspection of commercial and military aircraft.

Air Asia's relationship with the United States has made it the largest air service center in the east Asia, servicing all United States Air Force aircraft deployed in East Asia, and all covert operation aircraft from Pacific Corporation companies. It has serviced more than 12,000 USAF aircraft and retrofitted 8,000 aircraft engines during this period. During the Vietnam War, the US Navy also utilized Air Asia's services for maintaining their fleet of C-118B aircraft deployed in support of US Navy Seal and Seabee Teams. At the peak of its existence, it operated another service facility at Tachikawa, Japan.
