= Pacific Corporation =

CIA airline holding company

- Type: Holding company
- Predecessor: Airdale Corporation
- Founded: 1950; 76 years ago
- Founder: George A. Doole Jr.
- Defunct: 1979; 47 years ago
- Fate: liquidation
- Headquarters: Delaware, United States
- Owner: CIA
- Number of employees: 0

The Pacific Corporation (originally Airdale Corporation) was a holding company that the Central Intelligence Agency used to control several aviation front companies.

Former US Army pilot George A. Doole Jr. created Pacific Corporation, incorporated in Delaware in 1950. He concealed the agency's involvement by shuffling aircraft continuously among various shell corporations and altering aircraft registration numbers, a tactic the agency apparently still uses (see N44982) and also using three corporate Officer/ Board Members in the name of the Sigler Corporation, the nominee of Manufacturers Hanover Trust Co. custodian. The corporation dissolved in 1979 after selling its assets.

Pacific's affiliates included:

- Actus Technology
- Air America, originally named Civil Air Transport, defunct
- Air Asia Co. Ltd., air maintenance activity
- Intermountain Aviation
- Seaboard World Services
- Southern Air Transport
- Thai Pacific Services
