= Evergreen International Aviation =

Aviation services company

Evergreen International Aviation, Inc.
- Founded: 1960; 66 years ago as Evergreen Helicopters
- Defunct: 2014; 12 years ago
- Fate: Chapter 7 bankruptcy liquidation
- Headquarters: McMinnville, Oregon, United States
- Key people: Delford M. Smith

Evergreen International Aviation, Inc. was a global aviation services company based in McMinnville, Oregon, United States. Founded in 1960, Evergreen was primarily known publicly for commercial helicopter operations in agricultural and forestry applications.

The airline division, Evergreen International Airlines, operated worldwide, in 168 countries, and by the end had been reduced to a fleet of all-cargo Boeing 747 freighters. The company also operated a helicopter division, Evergreen Helicopters which was sold to Erickson Air-Crane, an Oregon-based helicopter operator, for $250 million in 2013. Faced with bankruptcy and tax investigations, Evergreen ceased all aviation-related operations in 2013 and shut down in 2014.

== History ==
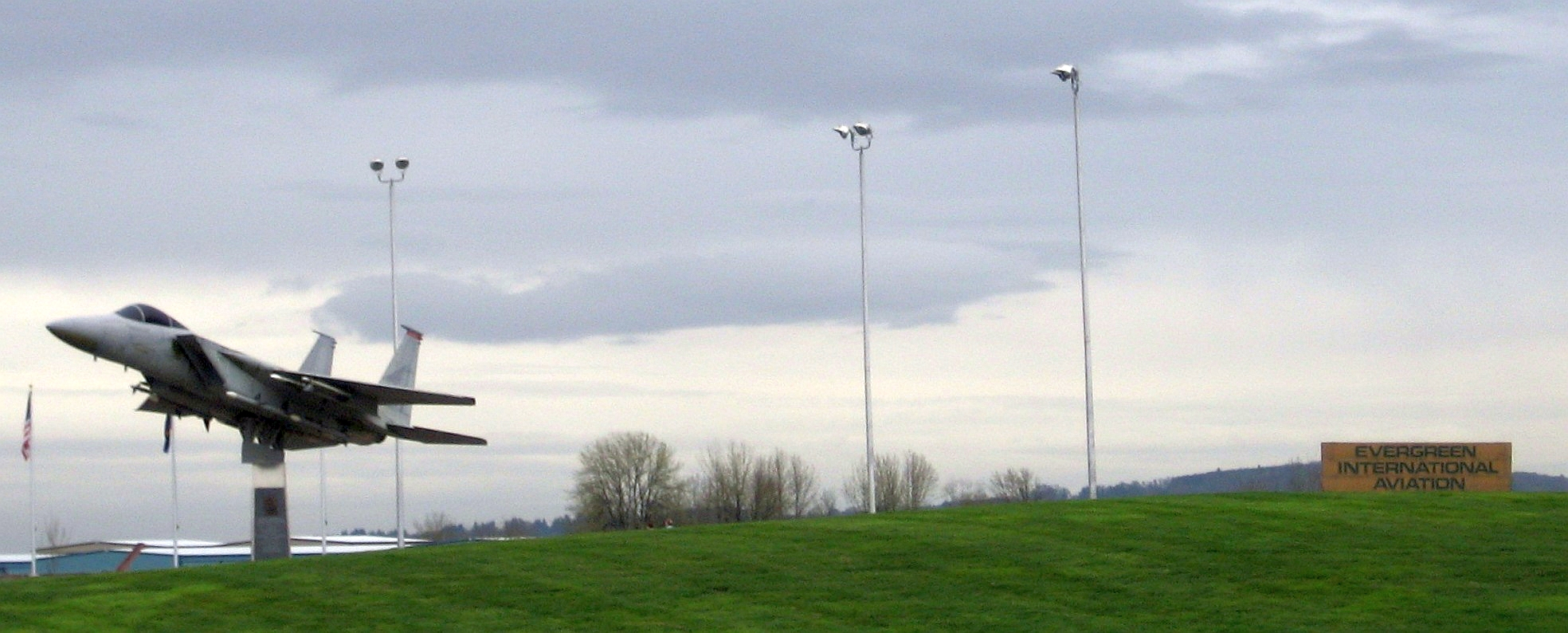
Monument to Capt Michael King Smith, USAF, son of Evergreen founder Del Smith, at the entrance to Evergreen International Aviation headquarters near the McMinnville Municipal Airport. Capt Smith, an F-15 Eagle pilot in the Oregon Air National Guard, was killed in an auto accident in 1995.

Delford M. Smith founded the company as Evergreen Helicopters in 1960. Smith was involved in the development of the commercial use of helicopters, and his company was one of the first to use helicopters for spraying fertilizer and herbicides, spreading seeds and fighting forest fires. Smith helped develop a helicopter spray system called the "PaceSpreader" which permitted accurate, fast delivery of granular agents over large areas. The PaceSpreader allowed the helicopter to operate at relatively high speeds while still delivering the product evenly and with measured precision. In 1972 the company expanded into the use of heavy lift helicopters, acquiring a number of Sikorsky S-61. In March 1973 the massive Sikorsky S-64 Skycrane was added to the fleet, with a lift capacity of 20,000 pounds.

In 1974 Smith became aware that the Johnson Flying Service was looking to sell its assets. The business was a small supplemental carrier that had two 94-passenger Lockheed L-188 Electra four-engine turbo-prop passenger aircraft. More importantly, it held a supplemental air carrier operating certificate which allowed it to operate as an airline. After significant deliberation, the Civil Aeronautics Board approved the transfer in 1975. Evergreen International Airlines was officially formed and incorporated on 16 April 1975 as a subsidiary of Evergreen Helicopters, Inc. The business subsequently continued to expand and split into a number of subsidiary divisions. The main subsidiary was Evergreen International Airlines which operated the Boeing 747 as a cargo or tanker aircraft to locations around the world. The 747-200 "Evergreen Supertanker" was capable of delivering 20,000 gallons of water on wildfires, nearly ten times what could be delivered by a conventional U.S. Forest Service firefighting air tanker such as the Lockheed P-3 Orion turboprop.

=== Scheduled passenger airline operations ===
The airline division conducted some scheduled passenger operations with Douglas DC-8 jet and Lockheed L-188 Electra turboprop aircraft with Detroit (DTW), Minneapolis/St. Paul (MSP), Seattle (SEA) and Spokane (GEG) being served in 1978. The company also operated a commuter airline, Evergreen Airspur, in southern California with de Havilland Canada DHC-6 Twin Otter STOL turboprops in 1985.

=== U.S. government work ===
Evergreen was part of the US Civil Reserve Air Fleet and the International Peace Operations Association. It was known to do work for the United States federal government, including fire suppression for the U.S. Forest Service, troop transportation in the Gulf War of 1991, as well as helicopter transportation for oil rig firefighters at the end of hostilities.

=== CIA front ===
Evergreen served as a Central Intelligence Agency (CIA) front in numerous operations over its history:

Wherever there was a hot spot in the world, Evergreen’s helicopters and later airplanes were never far behind. Evergreen’s hardware was so inextricably linked with political intrigue that rumors swirled that the company was owned by, or a front for, the U.S. Central Intelligence Agency (CIA). Indeed, several of the company’s senior executives either worked for the agency or had close ties to it.

Smith never let on, disingenuously telling the Portland Oregonian in 1988, “We don't know when we’ve ever worked for them [the CIA], but if we did we’re proud of it. We believe in patriotism, and, you know, they're not the [Russian spy service] KGB.”

Evergreen bought assets during the 1970s that were previously linked to CIA operations, including Montana’s Johnson Flying Service and the CIA’s aviation "skunk works" at Pinal Airpark in Marana, Arizona, which under Evergreen did special aircraft modifications such as building the Boeing Dreamlifters (outsized 747s designed to transport Boeing 787 composite fuselage barrels) and servicing the NASA operated Boeing 747 Shuttle Carrier Aircraft (SCA) used to transport the Space Shuttle. Evergreen subsequently sold the Pinal Airpark facility to Relativity Capital in 2011.

Officially, the company provided "aviation services" for the CIA, including transporting the Shah of Iran from Egypt to Panama, then Panama to the United States in 1980.

=== Sale of Evergreen Helicopters ===
Evergreen Helicopters was sold to Erickson Air-Crane in March 2013 for $250 million. The sale provided Evergreen International Aviation with the liquidity needed to continue operations. Smith said: "The sale of EHI provides us with needed capital to repay existing debt and gives us the liquidity to support our airline and remaining businesses." The deal was contingent upon Erickson Air-Crane obtaining the necessary financing.

=== Demise ===
On 8 November 2013 Evergreen International Airlines, a subsidiary of Evergreen International Aviation, announced via a voicemail to their employees that all operations would cease effective 29 November 2013.

Evergreen’s airplanes and helicopters had once "supported United Nations peacekeeping operations in 30 countries, flew insect-eradication missions throughout Africa, were used for illegal-drug abatement spraying in Mexico and South America, helped build the Trans-Alaska oil pipeline and developed and serviced the offshore energy market worldwide. All told, Smith said his company flew in 168 countries over the years. 'We were all over the world. Everywhere they needed a helicopter, they needed an airplane as well,'" said Smith.

In June of 2014, Evergreen had declared Chapter 7 bankruptcy and began a liquidation of assets, including its headquarters campus in McMinnville.

By the time of Smith's death 7 November 2014, the remains of his once billion-dollar Evergreen Aviation empire had been sold off, shut down, or was in bankruptcy and under investigation by tax authorities.

== Fleet at the time of the end of aviation operations in 2013 ==
Evergreen International Aviation Fleet:
Aircraft	Active	Stored	Notes
Boeing 747-100F	1	10	1 Converted to Evergreen Supertanker
Boeing 747-200F	0	9
Boeing 747-400F	4	0

== Previous fixed wing aircraft ==
Evergreen also operated the following jet and turboprop aircraft at various times during its existence:

- Beechcraft King Air – including BE-90 King Air and BE-200C Super King Air aircraft
- Beechcraft 1900D
- Boeing B-17 – converted for use as a firefighting air tanker
- Boeing 727-100
- CASA 212
- de Havilland Canada DHC-6 Twin Otter
- Douglas DC-8 - including DC-8-52, Super DC-8-63 and Super DC-8-73F aircraft
- Douglas DC-9-15
- Gulfstream IV
- Learjet 35A
- Lockheed L-188 Electra
- Lockheed P-2 Neptune - converted for use as a firefighting air tanker
- McDonnell Douglas DC-9-30

== Previous helicopter types ==
The helicopter division of Evergreen operated the following rotorcraft at various times during its existence:

- Aerospatiale Alouette III - SA 316B models
- Aerospatiale SA 315B Lama
- Aerospatiale SA 330 Puma
- AgustaWestland AW139
- Bell 206 JetRanger - B206B-3 JetRanger III models
- Bell 206 LongRanger - B206L-3 LongRanger III & B206L-4 LongRanger IV models
- Bell 205
- Bell 212
- Bell 214ST
- Bell 412EP
- Eurocopter AS332 Super Puma - AS332L1 models
- Eurocopter AS350 AStar - AS350B2 and AS350B3 models
- Hiller UH-12E
- Hughes 500D
- MBB BO 105
- Sikorsky S-61R
- Sikorsky S-64 Skycrane
- Sikorsky S-76C++
- Sikorsky S-92

== See also ==
- Evergreen Aviation & Space Museum
- Intermountain Aviation
- Pinal Airpark
- List of defunct airlines of the United States
