= Félix Rodríguez (soldier) =

Cuban-American CIA officer (born 1941)

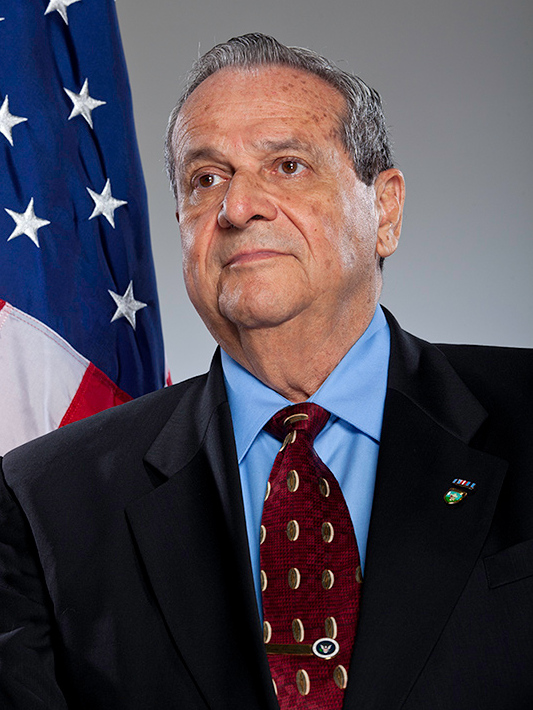
- Rodríguez in 2011
- Born: 31 May 1941 (age 85); Havana, Cuba
- Military career
- Allegiance: United States of America
- Branch: Central Intelligence Agency; United States Army
- Service years: 1959–present
- Rank: Colonel
- Nicknames: Lázaro, Max Gómez, Félix Ramos Medina, Félix El Gato
- Units: Special Activities Division; Army Special Forces; MACV-SOG
- Conflicts: Bay of Pigs Invasion; Operation Mongoose; Ñancahuazú Guerrilla; Vietnam War; Contra War
- Awards: Intelligence Star; Silver Star (9); Crosses for Gallantry by Republic of Vietnam

Félix Ismael Rodríguez Mendigutia (born 31 May 1941) is a Cuban-American former Central Intelligence Agency Paramilitary Operations Officer in the Special Activities Division, known for his involvement in the Bay of Pigs Invasion and the execution of communist revolutionary Che Guevara as well as his close ties to George H. W. Bush during the Iran–Contra affair.

== Early life ==
Rodríguez came from a family of land owners in his native Cuba. His uncle was the Minister of Public Works during Fulgencio Batista's government.

He attended the Perkiomen School in Pennsylvania but dropped out to join the Anti-Communist League of the Caribbean, which had been created by Dominican dictator Rafael Trujillo with the intention of overthrowing the Cuban government.

The invasion of Cuba was a failure, and Rodríguez returned to Perkiomen. He graduated in June 1960 and went to live with his parents in Miami, where thousands of Cuban exiles had moved.

In September 1960, he joined a group of Cuban exiles in Guatemala, supported by the Central Intelligence Agency (CIA) to receive military training. They were called Brigade 2506. Along with other exiles he was trained at Fort Benning, Georgia.

== Bay of Pigs Invasion ==
Rodriguez participated in the Bay of Pigs Invasion as a paramilitary operations officer with the CIA's Special Activities Division. He clandestinely entered Cuba a few weeks before the failed operation. Using his familiarity with the country, he was able to gather critical intelligence, which was used in the planning and preparation of the invasion.

== Bolivia ==
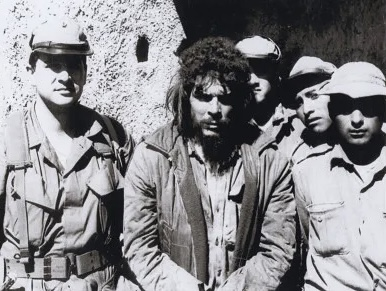
CIA officer Félix Rodríguez (left) before the execution of Che Guevara (center)

CIA authenticated the picture of Che Guevara and Félix Rodríguez and recognizes it as original.

In 1967, the CIA again recruited Rodríguez to train and head a team to hunt down Che Guevara, who was attempting to overthrow the US-backed government in Bolivia and to replace it with a communist government.

The last photograph of Guevara alive includes Rodriguez standing by his side, but according to Dino Brugioni, a former senior official at the CIA's National Photographic Interpretation Center (NPIC), it is a photomontage.

== Vietnam ==
He became a US citizen in 1969. During his career with the CIA, he also went by the nom de guerre "Max Gomez" after Máximo Gómez, the Dominican general who fought in the Cuban War of Independence. He was awarded the Intelligence Star for Valor by the CIA and nine Crosses for Gallantry by the South Vietnamese government. He was codenamed Lazarus after his survival of the Bay of Pigs operation.

During the Vietnam War, Rodríguez flew over 300 helicopter missions and was shot down five times. In 1971, Rodríguez trained Provincial Reconnaissance Units (PRUs). They were CIA-sponsored units that worked for the Phoenix Program. The Walsh Report states (Chapter 29): "During the Vietnam War, [Donald] Gregg supervised CIA officer Felix Rodriguez and they kept in contact following the war." Rodríguez also reported to Ted Shackley during the Phoenix Program. Shackley became Bush's top aide for operations when he directed the CIA, and Gregg later became National Security Advisor for Vice-President Bush. Rodríguez was in frequent contact with him regarding arms for the Contras.

In 1970, after the Cambodian incursion, Bien Hoa CIA Spymaster Orrin DeForrest worked with Rodríguez, whom he described as "the CIA's hotshot pilot," and his PRU in rolling up the Viet Cong stronghold of An Tinh in South Vietnam. Rodríguez flew above the village in a Loach light helicopter and marked target houses holding VC suspects with orange smoke, and the PRU then went in and emptied the houses of occupants, lined them up, and identified suspects with the assistance of a former VC leader who had been captured before he began to co-operate with the CIA; DeForrest identified him as "Ba Tung." The operation netted 28 VC cadre who had been living openly among the South Vietnamese but were working to assist the North Vietnamese overthrow their southern neighbors. The mass arrest and detention of Subregion One VC cadre was the largest operation of its type during the war and, for all intents and purposes, broke the VC hold on its stronghold of An Tinh.

== Iran-Contra affair ==
There is extensive documentation of Rodríguez's ties to US Vice-President George H. W. Bush during the Iran–Contra affair from 1983 to 1988. In September 1986, General John K. Singlaub wrote to Oliver North expressing concern about Rodríguez's daily contact with the Bush office and warned of damage to US President Ronald Reagan and the Republican Party. The Walsh Report (Chapter 25) stated that M. Charles Hill took notes at a meeting between George Shultz and Elliott Abrams on 16 October 1986 as follows:

Felix Rodriguez [sic] – Bush did know him from CIA days. FR [Rodriguez] is ex-CIA. In El Salv[ador] he goes around to bars saying he is buddy of Bush. A y[ea]r ago Pdx [Poindexter] & Ollie [North] told VP staff stop protecting FR as a friend – we want to get rid of him from his involvnt [sic] w[ith] private ops. Nothing was done so he still is there shooting his mouth off. (brackets are in the original)

Rodríguez met with Donald Gregg, now Bush's National Security advisor. The Walsh Report (Chapter 29) stated, "Gregg introduced Rodriguez to Vice President Bush in January 1985, and Rodriguez met with the Vice President again in Washington, D.C., in May 1986. He also met Vice President Bush briefly in Miami on May 20, 1986." Rodríguez also met and spoke with Bush's advisor Gregg and his deputy, Colonel Samuel J. Watson III.

On 5 October 1986, the Corporate Air Services C-123, carrying Eugene Hasenfus was shot down over Nicaragua, which killed two US pilots, William H. Cooper and Wallace B. Sawyer Jr., and one Latin American crewmember. "Rodriguez unsuccessfully attempted to call Gregg to inform him of the missing plane. He reached Watson, who in turn notified the White House Situation Room. The following day, Rodriguez called Watson again and told him that the airplane was one of North's." Hasenfus told reporters that he worked for "Max Gomez," an alias for Rodríguez, and "Ramon Medina," an alias for Luis Posada Carriles, of the CIA. On 10 October 1986, Clair George, the head of CIA clandestine operations, testified before Congress that he did not know of any direct connection between Hasenfus and Reagan administration officials. In the fall of 1992, George was convicted on two charges of false statements and perjury before Congress but was pardoned on Christmas Eve that year by President Bush.

== Allegations regarding Kiki Camarena ==
In October 2013, two former DEA agents and a pilot who allegedly flew for the CIA claimed to the Mexican journal Proceso and to the US network Fox News that the CIA had been "complicit" in the murder of DEA agent Enrique "Kiki" Camarena in 1985 and that Rodríguez had played a role. The alleged motive for the crime was that Camarena had supposedly discovered that the US government had collaborated with the Guadalajara Cartel in the importation and the transfer of drugs from Colombia to the United States via Mexico to use the proceeds to sponsor the Contras in Nicaragua in its war against the Sandinista government. Phil Jordan, a former director of the El Paso Intelligence Center (EPIC); Héctor Berrellez, a former agent of the United States Drug Enforcement Administration who directed Operation Leyenda to clarify the murder; and Tosh Plumlee, allegedly a former pilot for the CIA, claim to have the evidence that the US government itself ordered the capture and interrogation of Camarena, which led to his torture and death.

In July 2020, the documentary The Last Narc shows the testimonies of people like Héctor Berrellez, Phil Jordan, Mike Holm (a member of the DEA for 24 years), Manny Medrano (former assistant US Attorney and lead prosecutor in Camarena case) as well as Camarena's widow and three former police officers and former bodyguards of Ernesto Fonseca. The documentary explores the claims of the details of the torture and the interrogation, including some of the questions that Rodríguez allegedly asked Camarena in relation to the association that the CIA had allegedly reached with the Guadalajara cartel to bring cocaine into the US, the final goal being to finance the Nicaraguan Contras.

In 2013, Jack Lawn, a former head of the DEA, and retired Special Agent Jack Taylor, who investigated the murder, said the CIA had no involvement in Camarena's death. Without mentioning any agents by name, Jack Lawn also stated that "this is [a] fable not worthy of individuals who would serve in DEA." A CIA spokesperson told Fox News that "it's ridiculous to suggest that the CIA had anything to do with the murder of a U.S. federal agent or the escape of his killer."

== Activism ==
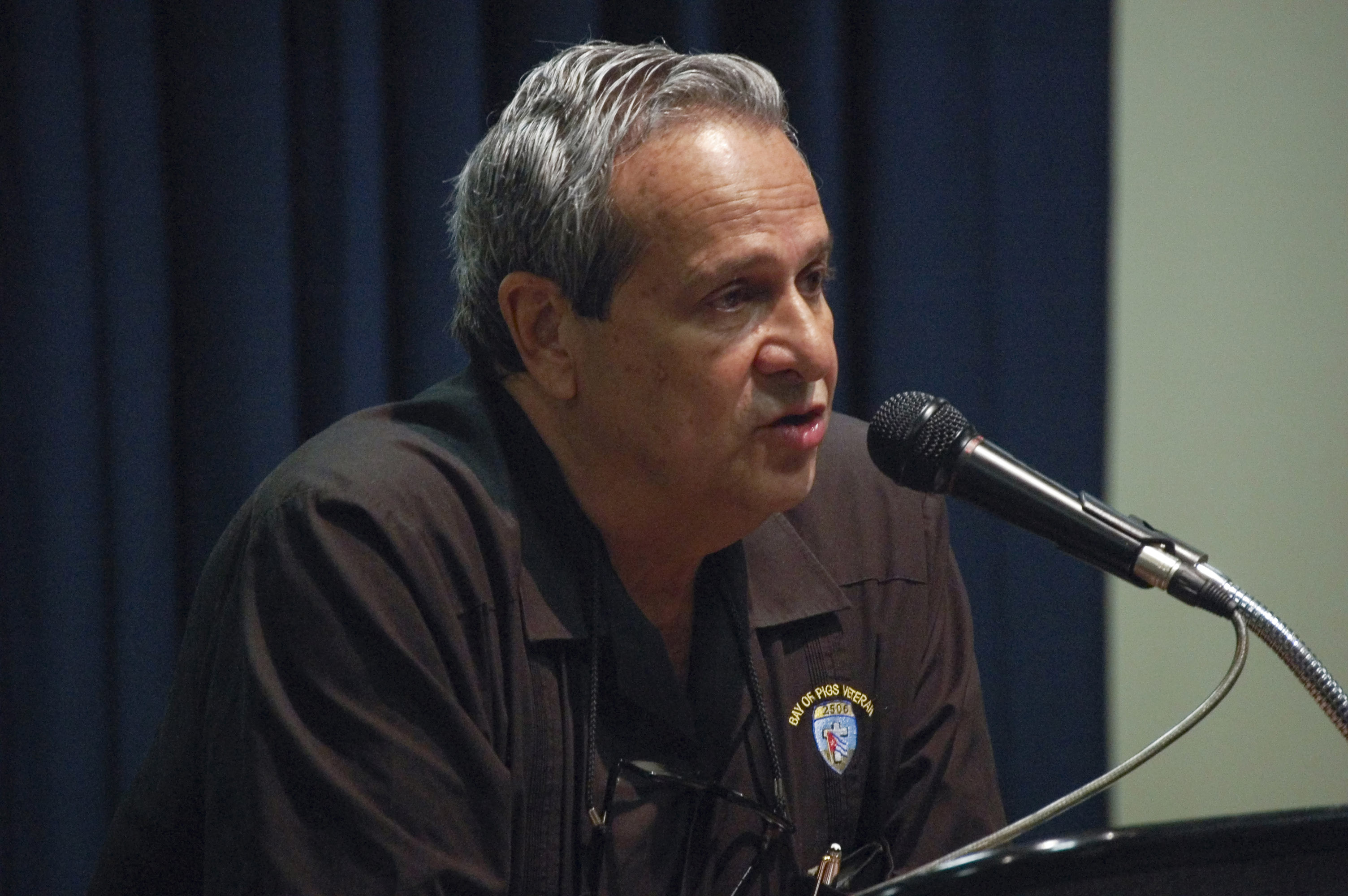
Rodríguez speaking at Christopher Columbus High School in Miami.

In 1989 Simon & Schuster published his memoir Shadow Warrior, co-written with John Weisman. In 2004, Rodríguez became president of the Brigade 2506 Veterans Association, a group for Bay of Pigs Invasion survivors.

During the 2004 US presidential election, Rodríguez was highly critical of the Democratic presidential candidate, John Kerry, in part because of their previous meeting at a Senate Subcommittee on Terrorism and Narcotics hearing in 1987 during which Rodríguez was questioned by Kerry about allegations of soliciting a $10 million donation from a Colombian cocaine cartel. The story, which was eventually shown to be false, had come from Ramón Milian Rodríguez, a convicted money launderer from Colombia.

In 2005, Rodríguez oversaw the opening of the Bay of Pigs Museum and Library in Little Havana, Florida, and became the chairman of the board of directors.
