= Hinrich Foundation =

Singapore-based philanthropic organisation

- Formation: 2012; 14 years ago
- Founder: Merle Hinrich
- Type: Philanthropic foundation
- Headquarters: Singapore
- Chairman: Merle Hinrich
- Chief executive: Kathryn Dioth
- Website: www.hinrichfoundation.com

The Hinrich Foundation is a philanthropic organisation based in Singapore that funds research and education on international trade. It was established in 2012 by Merle Hinrich, the founder of Global Sources.

== History ==
Hinrich founded the organisation in 2012 and has served as its chairman. Before its formal establishment, Hinrich's philanthropy operated as The Kearny Alliance, which made its first donation to Hong Kong Baptist University in 2003. He chaired its council of members by 2014, while still executive chairman of Global Sources, and the foundation became his principal activity after the company's sale to Blackstone in 2017. Hinrich has linked the foundation's emphasis on scholarships to the scholarship that funded his own graduate study at the Thunderbird School of Global Management. The foundation's education and research programmes have been coordinated from Singapore since 2020.

== Education ==
The foundation funds Global Trade Leader scholarships for master's-level study. In 2019 it partnered with RMIT Vietnam to develop a Master of Global Trade programme. Other university partners have included Hong Kong Baptist University, which made Hinrich an Honorary University Fellow in 2015 for the foundation's support of its scholarship programme; Nanyang Technological University, which received a S$186,000 fund in 2022 to provide six master's scholarships in media and communication; the Hong Kong Polytechnic University, where it established three full-time master's scholarships in 2013; the Hong Kong University of Science and Technology; and Thunderbird at Arizona State University, with which it signed a scholarship agreement in April 2026. By 2022 the foundation reported having awarded more than 260 master's scholarships.

Since 2022 the foundation has partnered with Quacquarelli Symonds on the QS International Trade Rankings, which assess graduate programmes on their preparation of students for careers in global trade. The first edition was published in December 2022.

== Research ==
Since 2022 the foundation and the IMD World Competitiveness Center have produced the annual Hinrich-IMD Sustainable Trade Index, which ranks 30 economies on economic, societal and environmental aspects of their trade. New Zealand ranked first in the first three editions, and the United Kingdom ranked first in 2025 and 2026. The foundation also publishes research papers on trade policy, and has funded journalism training through the National Press Foundation.

== Museum gallery ==
In November 2026 the foundation made a S$5 million naming gift to the Asian Civilisations Museum in Singapore. The museum's Maritime Trade Gallery on Level 1 was renamed the Hinrich Foundation Trade Gallery when it was unveiled on 18 November 2026, with entry remaining free for Singaporeans and permanent residents. The gift funds a phased programme of acquisitions, refreshed displays, interactive features and public programmes, including a refresh of the museum's Singapore Archaeology section planned for 2027. The unveiling formed part of the foundation's anniversary programme, which also included a S$750,000 Global Trade Leaders Scholarship programme at the NUS Business School, supported by the foundation and Shanghai Baolong Automotive Corporation, launched in October 2026.
