= Thunderbird School of Global Management =

Management school of Arizona State University

- Former name: American Institute for Foreign Trade
- Type: Public business school
- Established: 8 April 1946; 80 years ago
- Parent institution: Arizona State University
- Dean: Charla Griffy-Brown
- Location: Phoenix, Arizona, United States
- Campus: Urban
- Colors: Thunderbird Blue, Gold and Grey
- Website: thunderbird.asu.edu

The Thunderbird School of Global Management (or simply Thunderbird) is an affiliated school at Arizona State University, a public research university in the Phoenix metropolitan area. It was founded in 1946 as an independent, private institution and acquired by Arizona State University in 2014. The school moved to ASU's Downtown Phoenix campus in 2018 from its original location at the former WWII USAAF Thunderbird Field, from which the school was named. The campus built a new $75 million building for the school in 2021.

Thunderbird is a unit of the Arizona State University Enterprise. Its programs are accredited by the Higher Learning Commission and the Association to Advance Collegiate Schools of Business (AACSB).

As of 2018, the school had around 45,000 alumni, also referred to as "Thunderbirds” or "T-birds."

== History ==
=== Founding as a private institution (1946–2014) ===
The school derives its name from Thunderbird Field No. 1, a decommissioned World War II-era United States Army Air Forces base, which served as its campus for more than 70 years.

The American Institute for Foreign Trade was founded by Lt. Gen. Barton Kyle Yount, a US Army Air Forces (AAF) officer who purchased the former Thunderbird Field from the War Assets Administration for one dollar, subject to the condition that the property be used for educational purposes for a minimum of 10 years. This led to short-lived controversy as journalists questioned the propriety of the transaction. As head of the Army Air Training Command, Yount had been recruited to the project by two AAF colonels, Finley Peter Dunne Jr. and W. Stouder Thompson, who considered that the United States was (in Dunne's words) "notoriously short of personnel trained for foreign trade." Yount agreed that "the young men who were going to foreign countries to represent American business were, in many cases, entirely untrained and unfit to represent their firms and their government." The school was chartered as a nonprofit Arizona corporation on April 8, 1946. Over the next six months, Yount and Dunne (Thompson having departed the project) prepared the Glendale location, arranged financing, remodeled the physical plant (which included several airplane hangars and a control tower), and recruited faculty and students. Students were required to be "at least twenty years of age who, through study in college or the armed forces, have completed at least two years above high school, or the equivalent thereof." This last provision was interpreted to allow military or work experience to substitute for formal university study.

Classes officially began on October 1, 1946, with 285 students and 18 faculty members. (Early catalogues give these figures as 296 and 22, respectively.) 98% of the students attended on the G.I. Bill (provision was also made for the "instruction of wives"). The first certificates were awarded June 14, 1947. The program mixed business courses with instruction in Spanish or Portuguese languages and Latin American culture, for a "tripartite curriculum" consisting of international commerce, languages, and area studies. Course offerings soon expanded to include French language and Western European and "Far Eastern" area studies. In 1951, Thunderbird began granting the Bachelor of Foreign Trade to students who already possessed undergraduate degrees, or at least three years of coursework, while the others continued to be awarded certificates. Thunderbird thus became one of the first tertiary institutions to offer international business degrees.

A Master of Foreign Trade degree began to be offered in 1952, and required four semesters of study, in contrast to two semesters for the bachelors. (This replaced an earlier system which distinguished between Course I and Course II of the bachelor's degree, the latter being more specialized and requiring one or two additional semesters.) Over the following decades, the master's degree—renamed the Master of International Management (MIM) – came to dominate, while the undergraduate program was phased out (bachelor's degrees ceased to be awarded by 1975). The school accordingly changed its name to the "Thunderbird Graduate School of International Management" (in 1967), and then to the "American Graduate School of International Management" (in 1973). The American Management Association entered into some sort of relationship with the school, while the North Central Association granted Thunderbird regional accreditation in 1969 and 1974. Accreditation by the American Association of Collegiate Schools of Business proved more elusive (and would not be granted until 1994), since Thunderbird did not then award the MBA degree, and indeed emphasized the "difference of degree" in its marketing materials.

In 1953, the school logo (which had been affixed to several repurposed aircraft hangars) allegedly inspired the name of the U.S. Air Force demonstration flight team, the Thunderbirds.

The first foreign students enrolled in 1958, and their proportion steadily increased until 9-11, reaching some 60% of the student body.

In 1965, the U.S. Department of Commerce awarded the school the President's "E" Certificate for Export Service (later upgraded to an "E-star" ranking). A small flag signifying this flew in front of the school for decades.

Under the presidency of Arthur L. Peterson (served 1966–69), Thunderbird received regional accreditation; the size of the student body doubled (to 503 in 1967); and several significant building projects were undertaken, including a library. A pilot, Peterson was known for landing his plane on Thunderbird field.

William Voris (served 1971–1989) established overseas study programs in several foreign countries, including cooperative agreements with the Tecnológico de Monterrey (ITESM) and the Beijing Institute of Foreign Trade (1980). He also organized the school's first executive education programs.

The Thunderbird Hot Air Balloon Classic was first held in 1975, on the Thunderbird campus itself (which had been designed as an airfield). The event became an annual festival featuring student-run food-booths and the like. It was moved off-campus in 1989 and cancelled after 2006.

Enrollments steadily rose to a peak of about 1,600 in 1992. Meanwhile, Thunderbird's endowment also grew, reaching US$1 million in 1982, and $20 million in the late 1990s. At the same time, Thunderbird began to experience competition from other American (and ultimately, foreign) business schools as international business increasingly became a mainstream subject. Thunderbird's relative poverty and lack of affiliation with a full-fledged university, proved to be significant disadvantages, even as interest in business education skyrocketed during the Reagan administration. After 1992 Thunderbird's enrollment began to decline, dropping below 600 in 2003, and necessitating faculty and staff cuts in 2001 and 2004. This trend was exacerbated by the September 11 attacks (which led to stricter visa rules for foreign students), by the decline in the popularity of MBA study during the dot-com bubble, and ultimately by the Great Recession.

In 2001, Thunderbird began to offer an MBA in International Management, replacing the previously offered Master of International Management (MIM) degree. In 2004, the school changed its name to "Thunderbird, the Garvin School of International Management" following a $60 million pledge by alumnus Sam Garvin and his wife Rita (only part of which was ultimately donated). The same year, the school hired Ángel Cabrera to serve as president. Cabrera oversaw the school's 2006 adoption of a Professional Oath of Honor.

In 2007, the school again changed its name to "Thunderbird School of Global Management." Accordingly, the flagship Thunderbird degree was renamed MBA in Global Management in its Executive, Accelerated and Traditional formats. In order to attract other segments of prospective students, the institution also began to offer two new graduate degrees for young professionals: the Master of Science in Global Management and the transdisciplinary Master of Arts in Global Affairs and Management. In spite of reduced enrollment and a payroll of highly paid professors, the school endured the challenging years that followed the Great Recession (2008-2011) through a combination of debt financing and lean operations (Thunderbird programs abroad were limited to Prague in Europe and shared facilities in Latin America), coupled with additional revenues from corporate consulting services and tailored programs.

==== Laureate controversy ====
In 2012, Larry Penley became president of Thunderbird, and was forced to make further faculty and staff reductions. The following year, the school announced a planned partnership with Laureate Education, Inc. As part of the planned partnership, Thunderbird would remain a nonprofit organization, exempt from income tax as a 501(c)(3), but would establish a joint educational service company with Laureate, a for-profit company. This joint company would launch an undergraduate program and expand online programs. The planned partnership would allow Thunderbird to host events at Laureate campuses worldwide and establish Thunderbird campuses abroad. According to the agreement, although Laureate would be given three seats on Thunderbird's board, Thunderbird would retain its academic independence and degree-granting powers. Thunderbird would continue to operate from its Glendale campus, but would sell its campus to Laureate in a leaseback agreement, and use the money from the sale to pay off its debts. (Thunderbird alumni would have the option to purchase the campus from Laureate within two years, or the school could repurchase the campus at the end of the twenty-year lease agreement.) Also, Laureate and Thunderbird had planned to invest $20 million and $10 million respectively in campus improvements.

A number of Thunderbird alumni, and several board members, opposed the proposed partnership on the grounds that it would harm the school's reputation, and circulated a petition in protest. The Thunderbird Independent Alumni Association (not to be confused with the school-managed Thunderbird Alumni Network) was formed in the midst of the controversy. There were board resignations. Among those who resigned from the board in protest was alumnus and trustee Merle Hinrich, who called the transaction "a tragedy for Thunderbird and a total windfall for Laureate".

Although the proposal was approved by Thunderbird's board in June 2013, it was ultimately rejected by the Higher Learning Commission of the North Central Association of Colleges and Schools, Thunderbird's's regional accreditor. Since Thunderbird was then in an advanced state of financial exigency, attention naturally focused on acquisition by ASU, which expressed willingness to proceed.

=== As part of Arizona State University (2014–present) ===
Negotiations with ASU president Michael M. Crow concluded within months, with the new plan winning swift approval from both boards as well as the Higher Learning Commission. Under the plan, finalized in December 2014, ASU assumed Thunderbird's debts of $22 million, and received $20 million from Thunderbird's operating fund to stabilize its finances. ASU also acquired Thunderbird's Glendale campus (then estimated to be worth $20 million).

In 2015, ASU appointed Allen J. Morrison as CEO and Director General of Thunderbird. Since ASU already had an MBA program (the W. P. Carey School of Business), it was decided to phase out the Thunderbird MBA in favor of a Master of Global Management, a one-year program similar to the school's former Master of International Management degree (offered prior to 2001). Also, an undergraduate program (not offered since 1975) was recreated.

In 2018, ASU appointed Sanjeev Khagram as director general and dean of Thunderbird.

In October 2019, ASU and Thunderbird held a groundbreaking ceremony to celebrate the start of construction on Thunderbird's new global headquarters facility, adjacent to ASU's Sandra Day O'Connor College of Law on the Downtown Phoenix campus. The first classes in the new building were held in the fall semester of 2021, when Thunderbird celebrated its 75th anniversary.

=== Name changes ===
- 1946–1968: The American Institute for Foreign Trade (AIFT)
- 1968–1973: Thunderbird Graduate School of International Management (TGSIM)
- 1973–1997: The American Graduate School of International Management (AGSIM)
- 1997–2004: Thunderbird, the American Graduate School of International Management
- 2004–2007: Thunderbird, the Garvin School of International Management
- 2007-current: Thunderbird School of Global Management

=== Thunderbird presidents and directors general ===
Thunderbird presidents:

- Barton Kyle Yount (1947–49)
- William Lytle Schurz (1949-52[?])
- Ed Juliber (1952–53)
- Carl Sauer (1953–66)
- Arthur L. Peterson (1966–69)
- Robert F. Delaney (1970–71)
- William Voris (1971–89)
- Roy A. Herberger (1989–2004)
- Ángel Cabrera (2004–2012)
- Barbara Barrett, (Apr - Nov 2012)
- Larry E. Penley (2012–2015)

Directors general (under ASU):

- Allen J. Morrison (2015–2018)
- Sanjeev Khagram (2018–2024)
- Charla Griffy-Brown (2024–present)

== Academics ==
Thunderbird's degrees have historically included the Bachelor of Foreign Trade (1951–1975), the Master of Foreign Trade / Master of International Management (1952–2001), an MBA in Global Management (2001–2016), and executive education programs. Since its acquisition by ASU, Thunderbird has revived the undergraduate program (the Bachelor of Global Management; its students are called "Underbirds"), phased out the MBA (which the Carey School already offered), and introduced the Master of Global Management, a non-MBA graduate degree with a number of formal concentrations. Degrees currently offered include:

Undergraduate degrees:

- Bachelor of Global Management (BGM)
- Bachelor of Science in International Trade (BSIT)
- Online Bachelor of Global Management
- Online Bachelor of Science in International Trade

Two tracks are offered: one consisting of international business, language, and culture; and another which omits language (including all online programs).

Graduate degrees:

- Accelerated Masters (allowing Thunderbird undergraduates to complete a master's degree in one additional year)
- Master of Global Management (MGM)
- Master of Leadership and Management (MLM) - online
- Executive Master of Global Management (EMGM)
- Doctor of Professional Practice in Global Leadership and Management (DPP)

Other executive education and lifelong learning options are offered as well.

The school has several journals, best known of which is Thunderbird International Business Review, which is published six times a year. Thunderbird International Business Review was created in 1959 with the name The International Executive.

=== Rankings ===
Business school rankings

United States
- Bloomberg MBA: NR
- USNWR MBA: 88

Global
- Financial Times MBA: 53

Forbes ranked Thunderbird as the 54th best business school in the U.S. in 2011, and a 2012 report released by Bloomberg Businessweek ranked Thunderbird as the top international business program. Thunderbird was also ranked as the 5th most diverse school out of 82 schools surveyed, based on student responses about students' country of origin, gender and ethnicity. In 2013, The Financial Times ranked Thunderbird's executive education program ninth overall based on corporate client feedback to The Financial Times. Also in 2013, The Economist released ratings for online programs and gave Thunderbird a rating of "good", which was one step down from the publication's top rating of "excellent". In its 2014 rankings, published in 2013, U.S. News & World Report ranked Thunderbird as the best international business school in their annual rankings, marking the eighteenth consecutive year the school was named top international business program. In U.S. News & World Report's 2015 rankings, published in 2014, Thunderbird was ranked 85th for best business school, and second in the overall rankings for international business school.

According to a 2019 Times Higher Education/Wall Street Journal report, Thunderbird was ranked number 1 in the world in Masters in Management programs for its specialized Masters in Global Management (MGM) degree.

== Campuses ==
The original Thunderbird campus was located on the former World War II airfield Thunderbird Field No. 1 in Glendale, Arizona, a suburb of Phoenix. Built in 1941, the airfield was used to train pilots. The school has utilized the existing buildings on the airfield and many of the school's classrooms are located in the airfield's former barracks. Arizona Christian University is the new owner and occupant of Thunderbird's former campus in Glendale.

The airfield's air traffic control tower is still present on campus. Beginning in 2007, the tower underwent a restoration project at the urging of three Thunderbird students who raised $2.5 million for the project. The school was awarded the Ruth Bryne Historic Preservation Award by the city of Glendale for the renovation. The tower was occupied by the campus store, student lounges and a pub until the school relocated to Phoenix. Thunderbird's new building will feature a rooftop pub designed in the spirit of the iconic original.

In 2011, one of the then-70-year-old airplane hangars on campus was removed. The building, named the Thunderbird Activity Center by the school, had been used for special events and exams, but was determined to no longer meet safety standards following an inspection of the campus.

Thunderbird also has satellite Centers for Excellence in Dubai, UAE; Geneva, Switzerland; Jakarta, Indonesia; and Tokyo, Japan, among several others. The school currently has 15 worldwide campuses and has plans to open several new satellite Centers for Excellence (hub offices) in the next few years with a goal to have a global network of 20 satellite hubs by the year 2025. The hubs will support professional English education, recruiting, alumni and community engagement, and executive education. All the hubs will be connected to the global headquarters facility in downtown Phoenix. The goal is for the headquarters to function as a digital and physical space that will connect the school's global network of 45,000 alumni with students, faculty, and staff.

Other buildings on the original campus included the International Business Information Centre (IBIC), which was Thunderbird's library, and a dining hall for students. The school's campus also featured a Welcome Wall, which was built in 1992, and displayed greetings in different languages.

On December 12, 2017, ASU announced that Thunderbird's historical campus will be closed and the school will be moved to a facility in downtown Phoenix. As part of the move, the City of Phoenix agreed to invest $13.5M in the new building, a record investment for Thunderbird. ASU and Thunderbird are covering the remaining cost of the $75 million facility using funds from fundraising, including the old Glendale campus and another parcel in nearby Scottsdale.

The old campus in Glendale has since become Arizona Christian University.

== Notable alumni and faculty ==
=== Notable alumni ===
- Walid Chammah, former chairman of Morgan Stanley
- Joaquin Duato, CEO of Johnson & Johnson
- Bob Dudley, retired CEO of BP
- Merle Hinrich, founder of Global Sources and the Hinrich Foundation
- David Hu, IIG cofounder sentenced to jail for running a Ponzi scheme
- Ramon Laguarta, CEO of PepsiCo
- Luis Alberto Moreno, former Ambassador of Colombia to the United States and former president of the Inter-American Development Bank
- Don Novello, comedian best known for his character Father Guido Sarducci
- Sven Ombudstvedt, CEO of Norske Skog (Japan Campus of Foreign Universities)
- Todd Rustman, business executive and writer
- Michael Slobodchikoff, author, academic, and media analyst
- Mark Smucker, CEO of The J.M. Smucker Company
- Revathi Advaithi, CEO of Flex
- Lee Abbamonte, the youngest American to visit all 193 United Nations member states, graduated in 2010
- Christopher Campbell, former Assistant Secretary of the United States Treasury
- Halla Tómasdóttir, president of Iceland

=== Notable faculty ===
- Stefan Michel, Swiss economist, Professor of Global Marketing (2003-2008)
- Dan Quayle, 44th vice president of the United States, "distinguished visiting professor of international studies"

== See also ==
- List of United States graduate business school rankings
- List of business schools in the United States
