= Chammah =

Chammah is a surname. Notable people with the surname include:

- Itai Chammah (born 1985), Israeli swimmer
- Lolita Chammah (born 1983), French actress
- Ronald Chammah (born 1951), French film director
- Walid Chammah (born 1954), Lebanese banker
