= Merle Hinrich =

American philanthropist and businessman

Merle Allan Hinrich is a Singapore-based businessman and philanthropist. He founded the Hong Kong trade publishing business that became Global Sources, a business-to-business media and trade exhibition company he led until its sale in 2017. He extended his company's Asian supplier catalogues online in 1995, and launched its sourcing fairs business. In 2013, as a trustee of the Thunderbird School of Global Management, resigned in opposition to the school's agreement with the for-profit company Laureate Education. In 2012, he established the Hinrich Foundation.

== Early life and education ==
Hinrich is a native of Glenvil, Nebraska. He graduated from Hastings High School and received a Bachelor of Arts in business administration and mathematics from Kearney State College, now the University of Nebraska at Kearney, in 1964. He completed a master's degree in 1965 at the American Institute for Foreign Trade, later renamed the Thunderbird School of Global Management, in Arizona. The university awarded him an honorary Doctor of Humane Letters in 1996 and a Distinguished Alumni Award in 2025.

== Career ==
=== Trade publishing ===
Hinrich moved to Asia in 1965, after completing his master's degree, and sold advertising for The Importer, a trade magazine based in Tokyo. The work took him across the region and brought him into contact with manufacturers and suppliers who had few means of reaching buyers and retailers in the United States and Europe.

He co-founded Trade Media Limited in Hong Kong in 1970 and launched its first B2B trade magazine, Asian Sources, in February 1971, going on to lead the company as its chief executive and later, chairman, through the rest of the 1990s. Further titles under Asian Sources were launched, among them Electronics, Hardwares, Electronic Components, Timepieces, Gifts & Home Products, Fashion & Accessories, which carried advertising for light industrial goods made in East Asia and sold to importers abroad. Advertising and subscription revenues reached about US$62 million in 1999, roughly two-thirds of the company's total.

From the late 1980s, the company developed order-processing software and electronic data interchange services for multinational trading organizations and importers, among them Liz Claiborne, Aiwa, Coles Myer (Coles) and Reebok. Hinrich launched Asian Sources Online in 1995. Listings were gathered by a sales force of around 700 representatives who visited factories with digital cameras and laptops to photograph products and upload the results. By 1999, the business acted as an online intermediary in trade, between Asian manufacturers and Western buyers, worth hundreds of millions of dollars a year. Hinrich resisted being labelled "Asia's e-commerce king". In April 2000, the business reached the Nasdaq through a reverse merger with Fairchild, a Bermuda-registered optical disc equipment company. Hinrich’s holding of about 15 per cent was valued at $119 million. Trading as Global Sources, the company expanded into trade exhibitions.

=== Sale of Global Sources ===
Blackstone approached Hinrich, then executive chairman of Global Sources, with a non-binding indication of interest in January 2017. During the negotiations, Hinrich informed the board that he intended to sell all his shares and would not retain an ownership interest or special management role following the acquisition. In March 2017, Global Sources requested US$17.00 per share from Blackstone and another prospective buyer. On 16 May, Hinrich sent both parties a draft agreement proposing US$17.50 per share. After competing offers increased the proposed price, Blackstone agreed to US$18.00 per share on 23 May. A subsequent bid of US$20.00 per share from the competing buyer prompted Blackstone to match that price on 25 May, establishing the final acquisition price. As of June 2017, Hinrich was the controlling shareholder, deemed to beneficially own up to approximately 64.86 per cent of the company's issued shares. The acquisition was completed in August 2017, and Global Sources was subsequently delisted from the Nasdaq.

== Thunderbird School of Global Management ==
Hinrich is an alumnus and former trustee of the Thunderbird School of Global Management in Glendale, Arizona. Around 1994, he gave more than US$1 million towards completing a library on its campus. The school conferred an honorary Doctor of International Law on him in 2010.

In March 2013, the school's board approved a $66 million alliance with Laureate Education, under which Laureate would buy and lease back the campus and take part in a jointly owned services venture. Hinrich resigned from the board, writing in his resignation letter that the transaction was "a tragedy for Thunderbird and a total windfall for Laureate". Five trustees resigned over the agreement and nearly 2,000 alumni signed a petition against it.

Hinrich said the school had approached too few prospective partners and had settled on the option that offered money rather than weighing quality, continuity or the suitability of the partner. He objected to terms that gave Laureate majority control of the joint venture's board, and seats on the school's own board. With the school in the position of landlord, he said this left Thunderbird at risk of being directed by a for-profit company. Laureate's chief executive, Douglas Becker, responded that critics had offered no alternative plan for a school facing declining fundraising, a US$4 million deficit and falling rankings.

A formal complaint was submitted to the Higher Learning Commission, Thunderbird's accreditor, in February 2014 on behalf of Hinrich, four other former alumni trustees and the Thunderbird Independent Alumni Association, asking the commission to refuse the school's change of control application.

== Hinrich Foundation ==
Hinrich established the Hinrich Foundation in 2012 and has served as its chairman. It funds research, education and scholarships relating to international trade. He chaired its council of members by 2014 while still executive chairman of Global Sources and the foundation became his principal activity after the 2017 sale. Hong Kong Baptist University made him an Honorary University Fellow in 2015 for the foundation's support of a scholarship programme there. In November 2026 the foundation's S$5 million naming gift to the Asian Civilisations Museum in Singapore renamed its Maritime Trade Gallery the Hinrich Foundation Trade Gallery; Hinrich said he hoped it would help "preserve Singapore's trading history and stories of its connectedness to the world".
