= Revathi Advaithi =

American business executive (born 1967)

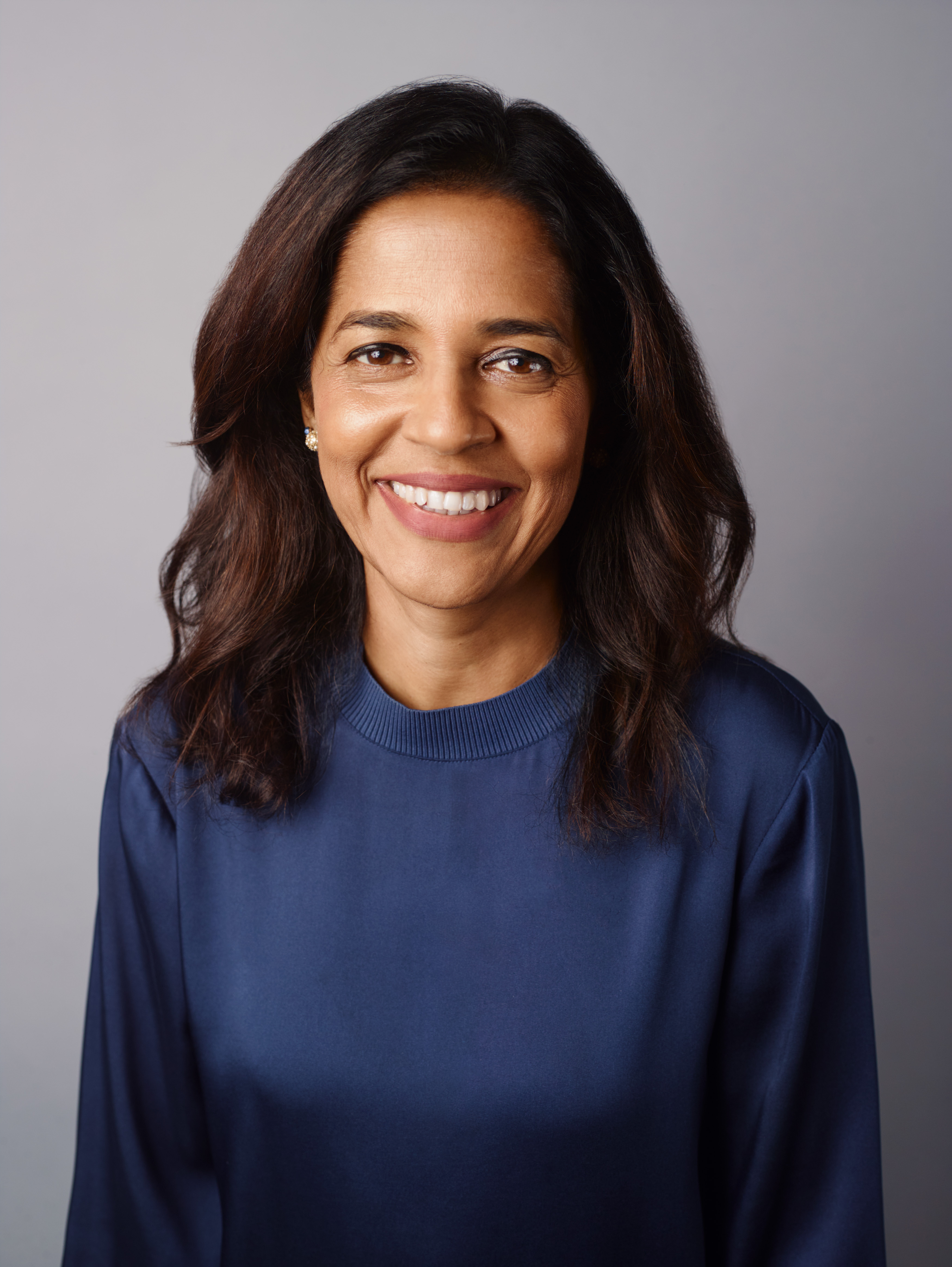
- Born: October 18, 1967 (age 59); India
- Education: Birla Institute of Technology and Science (BS); Thunderbird School of Global Management (MBA)
- Title: CEO of Flex
- Term: February 2019 – present
- Predecessor: Mike McNamara

Revathi Advaithi is an Indian-born American business executive. She is the CEO of Flex (formerly Flextronics) and an advocate for women in STEM and in the workplace.

Prior to joining Flex in 2019, Advaithi worked in various leadership positions at Eaton and Honeywell.

Advaithi served as a co-chair of the World Economic Forum (WEF) Advanced Manufacturing CEO Community (2022) and the WEF Alliance of CEO Climate Leaders (2021).

She currently serves as an independent director on the Board of Directors of Uber. She is also a member of the MIT Presidential CEO Advisory Board. She was named to Fortune's Most Powerful Women list in 2019, 2020, 2021, 2022, 2023, 2024, and 2025.

== Early life ==
Revathi Advaithi was born in Gujarat, India, into a Tamil family. Her father, A. N. N. Swamy worked for Indian Oil Corporation, and her mother, Visalam Swamy, was a homemaker. She has four sisters. Her family lived in Bihar and Assam before settling in Madras (now Chennai). Raised in a household that valued education, discipline, and curiosity, and encouraged independence, Advaithi developed an early interest in mathematics and problem-solving, which later led her to pursue engineering.

== Education ==
Advaithi graduated with a bachelor's degree in mechanical engineering from the Birla Institute of Technology and Science in 1990, and earned an MBA from the Thunderbird School of Global Management in 2005.

== Career ==
Advaithi began her career as a shop floor supervisor at Eaton in Shawnee, Oklahoma. She joined Honeywell in 2002, where she spent six years in functions spanning manufacturing and supply chain. In 2008, Advaithi returned to Eaton and helped run various groups within the electrical business unit for approximately 7 years before becoming Eaton's COO.

In February 2019, Advaithi joined Flex as CEO with a focus on driving the next era of technology, manufacturing and supply chain.

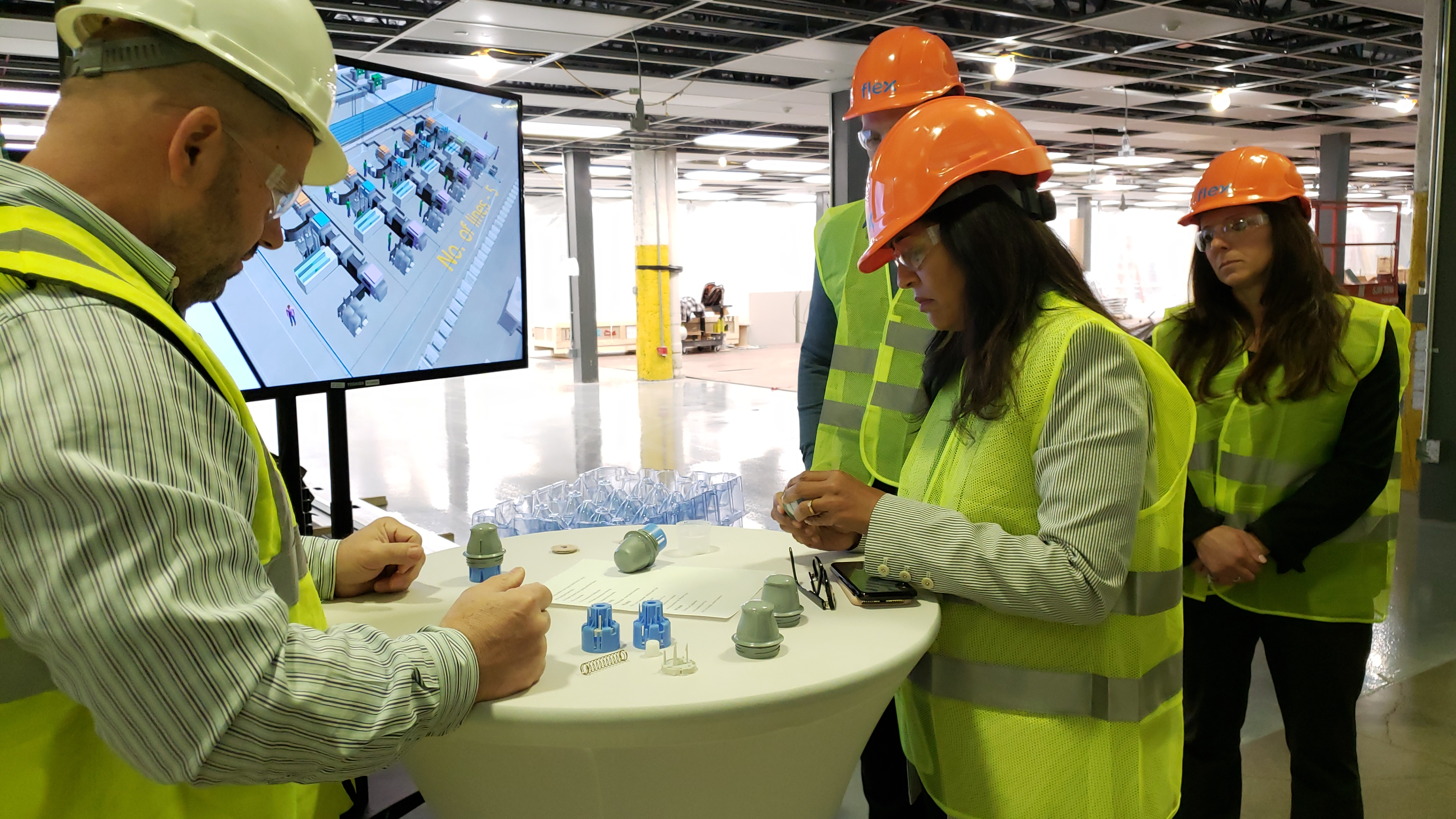
Revathi Advaithi at Buffalo Grove, Illinois

Under Advaithi, Flex has shifted its focus to end-to-end customer value chain ownership, augmenting its core contract manufacturing business.

Revathi has shared that her business philosophy heavily focuses on sustainability, culture, and diversity and inclusion. She frequently provides industry guidance for the manufacturing and supply chain sectors.

United States President Joe Biden appointed Advaithi to the Advisory Committee for Trade Policy and Negotiations (2023) and the Advisory Committee on Supply Chain Competitiveness (2022). In June 2023, Advaithi participated in the "Innovation Handshake" at the White House with India Prime Minister Narendra Modi and President Biden. The following month, Advaithi hosted President Biden at a Flex factory in South Carolina, highlighting Flex's partnership with Enphase Energy.

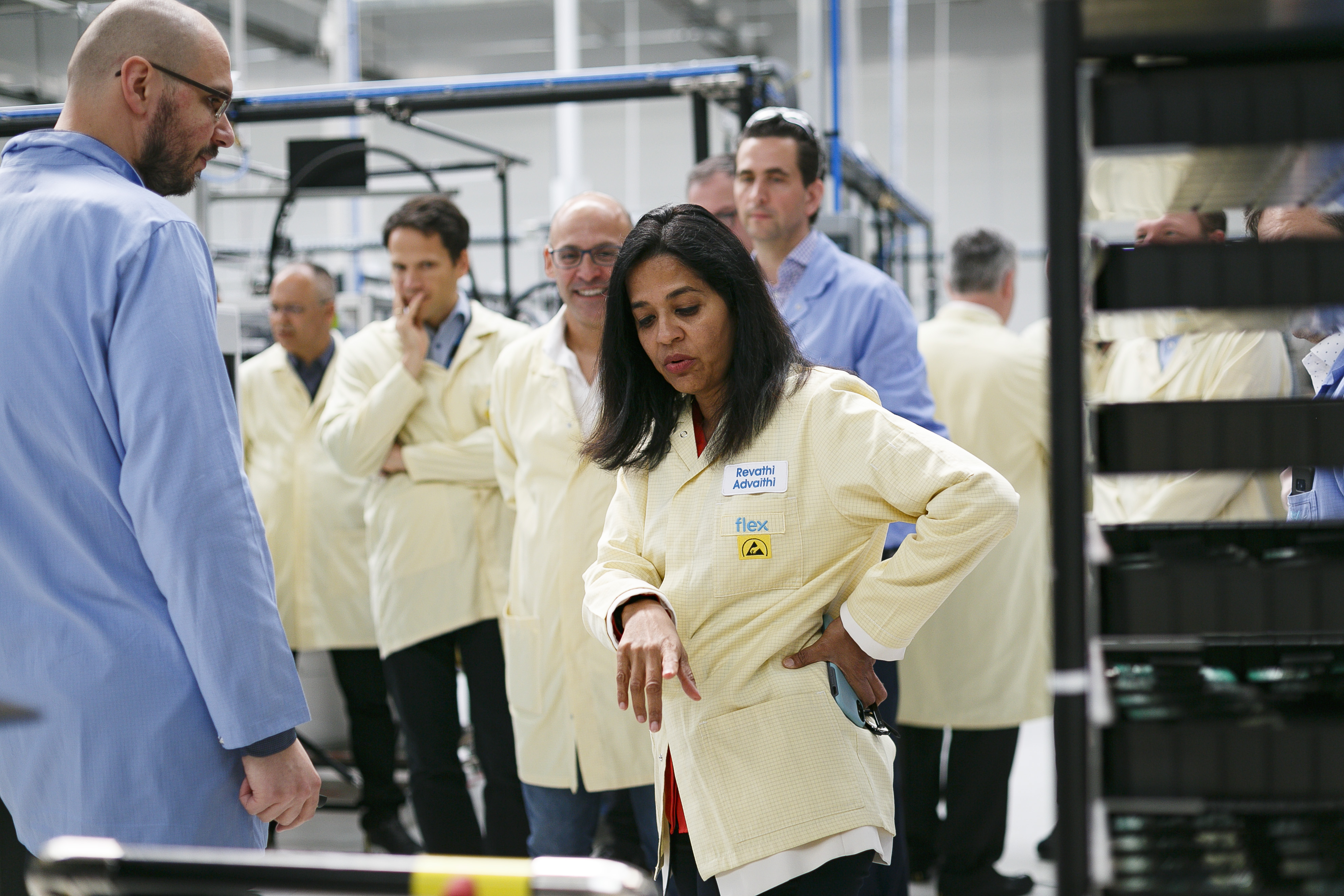
Flex CEO Revathi Advaithi at Tczew, Poland

Advaithi is also heavily focused on driving sustainable manufacturing practices at Flex. During her tenure, Flex made CDPs 'A list' for tackling water security and has pledged to cut operational emissions in half by 2030 based on a 2019 base year. In July 2022, under Advaithi's leadership, Flex announced a commitment to reach net zero greenhouse gas emissions by 2040.

Advaithi served on the board of BAE Systems between January 2018 - July 2020. In July 2020, she stepped down from this role and joined Uber as a board member. She is also a member of the Business Roundtable, and Catalyst CEO Champions For Change initiative.

== Media and speaking ==
Revathi was selected to the inaugural CNBC Changemakers: Women Transforming Business list in 2024.

In 2019, 2020, 2021, 2022, 2023, 2024 and 2025, Advaithi was named to Fortune's Most Powerful Women list, one of the few Indian-born CEOs recognized.

In April 2022, the Wall Street Journal profiled Advaithi in "The Modeling of a Manufacturing CEO" article.

From 2021-2025 Advaithi served as a member of World Economic Forum's Alliance of CEO Climate Leaders, a coalition of business leaders across key sectors committed to driving positive climate action and sustainable economic growth.

The Economic Times named Advaithi "Global Indian of the Year" in the 2023 ETPrime Women Leadership Awards.

Advaithi is also a frequent public speaker. She has spoken at the Fortune's Global Forum and Most Powerful Women conferences, the Collision Conference, Ethisphere's Global Ethics Summit, the WSJ CEO Council Summit, Harvard Business School panels, Women Executive 50 Summit and Catalyst conferences and Carnegie Mellon University events.

Under Advaithi, Flex was named one of the World's Most Admired and one of The World's Most Ethical Companies® by Ethisphere, and recognized on the Global 500 by Fortune.

== Personal life ==
Advaithi met her husband Jeevan Mulgund in Hutchinson, KS and they married in 1998. Mulgund and Advaithi have since lived in England, Shanghai, Phoenix, AZ, Pittsburgh, PA, and they are currently residing in the San Francisco Bay Area. They have two children.

Advaithi is a passionate advocate for diversity and inclusion in the workforce, as well as STEM education for girls and computer science education. Advaithi often says that she is inspired by her mother, who singlehandedly raised five daughters after her husband's death and ensured that they received good educations.
