= Lee Abbamonte =

American travel blogger and entrepreneur

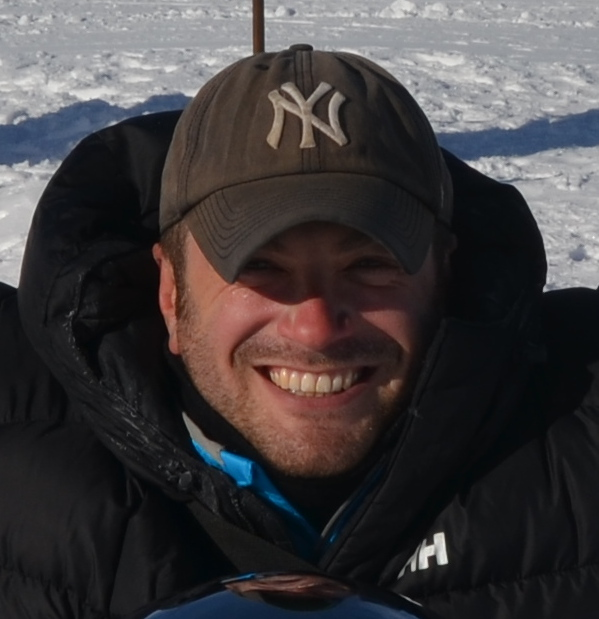
- Abbamonte at the South Pole in 2014
- Born: August 29, 1978 (age 48); Bridgeport, Connecticut, U.S.
- Education: University of Maryland, College Park
- Occupations: Travel blogger, speaker

Lee Abbamonte FRGS (born August 29, 1978) is an American travel blogger, on-air travel personality and entrepreneur who has been to all 193 United Nations member states, the North Pole and the South Pole.

== Early life ==
Abbamonte was born in Bridgeport, Connecticut and raised in Trumbull, Connecticut. He graduated in 2000 from the University of Maryland, College Park, where he received a degree from the Robert H. Smith School of Business. Abbamonte earned his MBA from the Thunderbird School of Global Management (now part of Arizona State University) in 2010.

After college, Abbamonte worked on Wall Street, spending time at Cantor Fitzgerald at the original One World Trade Center, Intercontinental Exchange, Citigroup, and Merrill Lynch.

== Travel career ==
By 2006, Abbamonte had visited more than 100 countries. In that year he launched his travel blog LeeAbbamonte.com and decided to make an effort to visit every country in the world, completing the goal in 2011 at the age of 32. He is currently regarded as one of the world's most well-traveled people and one of a handful of people to visit every country and both geographic poles.

Abbamonte has appeared on television including as an expert on CNN, FOX Business, Fox News, Bloomberg, Fox 5 New York, and Travel Channel. He has been featured, quoted or written about in dozens of publications including USA Today, BBC, Bravo, Chicago Tribune, Forbes, New York, Slate, Condé Nast Traveler, ABC News, The Washington Post, Martha Stewart Weddings, The Huffington Post, and U.S. News & World Report.

As a speaker, Abbamonte has appeared at The New York Times Travel Show, South by Southwest, Public Relations Society of America Travel and Tourism Conference, Travel Bloggers Exchange, the Travel & Adventure Show, and New York Trav Fest, among others.

He is a member of the Travelers' Century Club and a fellow of the Royal Geographical Society. During an interview on the Frommers Radio Travel Show, Arthur Frommer called him the "Marco Polo of the 21st Century."

== Interest in sports ==
Abbamonte is a sports fan, having written and spoken about it. His favorite teams are the New York Yankees, New York Giants, Maryland Terrapins men's basketball, Miami Hurricanes football, Arsenal F.C., FC Barcelona, and the now-defunct Hartford Whalers.

Abbamonte made his television debut in 2006, appearing on the ESPN sports trivia show Stump the Schwab.
