= Global Sources Magazines =

- Sample cover for Global Sources Electronics
- Categories: Trade magazine
- Frequency: Monthly
- First issue: September 1974
- Company: Global Sources
- Country: Hong Kong
- Language: English

Global Sources Magazines are a series of trade magazines designed for businesses importing from China and Asia. There are 19 specialized industry-specific titles published by the business-to-business media company Global Sources (NASDAQ-GS: GSOL). All except two titles are published monthly.

Global Sources offers four core services to buyers to facilitate trade – online marketplaces, print and digital magazines, sourcing research reports, and trade shows (China Sourcing Fairs).

== History ==
The magazine series originated from the export trade magazine Asian Sources, which was first published in 1971 by Trade Media Ltd in Hong Kong. It presented facts, analyzed developments, and anticipated market trends for its readers. The magazine also featured advertisements of suppliers of Asian-made products.

As trade trends evolved, the editors decided to publish separate titles based on major trade products, starting with Asian Sources Electronics in 1974. Other industry-specific titles were introduced over the years, such as Asian Sources Timepieces, Asian Sources Electronic Components and Asian Sources Computer Products. These magazines provided international market trends and verified business contacts from China and Asia to buyers from Western markets.

The company launched the print magazines on CD-ROMs in 1996 and went online in 2008 with digital versions of the print magazines.

As the company’s customer base and span of business expanded globally, a new corporate identity was established in 1998 to reflect this. Asian Sources became Global Sources and all its publications now carry the new name.

== Content ==
Global Sources Magazines has 19 titles, each focusing on a major export industry.

Each issue contains reports on trade news and market trends of the focus industry. The editorial policy advocates objective reporting of export and industry trends in China and Asia.

The magazines also feature detailed profiles of the latest products, along with specifications and photos. All advertisers and featured companies are “verified suppliers” – which indicates that Global Sources has visited or called them and confirmed their business details.

Readers can contact suppliers directly through advertisements and product/advertiser indexes. Advertisements in magazines are bound by strict advertising standards, and are mostly advised & produced by an in-house creative agency, thus maintaining a level of professionalism.

== Editions ==
There are 19 completely distinct titles of Global Sources Magazines, each focused on a major export industry, and worked on by a different editorial and research team. Listed below are the different editions, accompanied by the product lines they cover.

Auto Parts & Accessories: Auto safety & security automotive equipment, vehicle accessories, vehicle parts, vehicles

Baby & Children's Products: Apparel, bedding & furniture, footwear, school supplies, toy

Computer Products: Communications and networking, computer peripherals, computer subsystems, computer parts & services, internet communications

Electronic Components: Active components, batteries & power supplies, electromechanical components, interconnects, LEDs & optoelectronics

Electronics: Audio equipment, car electronics, personal/office electronics, photography equipment video equipment

Fashion Accessories: Bags & cases, beauty products & cosmetics, jewelry, men's & women's apparel, watches & accessories

Garments & Textiles: Fabri, fiber & yarn, garment display supplies, textile packaging & printing, textile supplies & services, underwear & swimwear

Gifts & Premiums: Games & hobbies, gift packaging, gifts & novelties, promotional gifts, stationery

Hardware & DIY: Building supplies, general hardware, lawn & garden, sanitary ware & plumbing, tools & accessories

Home Products: BBQ supplies, furniture & furnishings, health & wellness, kitchen appliances, personal care

India Products: India-made products including bags & cases, beauty products & cosmetics, jewelry, men's & women's apparel, watches & accessories

Korea Products: Korea-made products including car electronics, computer parts & service, computer subsystems, security cameras, surveillance products

Machinery & Industrial Supplies: Industrial machinery, industrial supplies, industry tooling & services, manufacturing equipment, vending machines

Medical & Health Products: Dentistry equipment, emergency products, medical care & supplies, medical equipment, physiotherapy supplies

Mobile & Wireless: Docking station, mobile device accessories, mobile phone, power banks, tablet PCs

Security Products: Access control products, auto safety & security, safety & emergency systems, security cameras, security systems & services

Solar & Energy Saving Products: Building insulation, LED displays, light bulbs & tubes, solar product, wind & hydropower system

Sports & Leisure: Bikes & skates, camping & leisure, fitness accessories, fitness equipment sporting goods

Telecom Products: Broadcasting equipment, Internet communications, satellite communications, telephones, wireless communications

Print, digital and mobile app editions are also available. However, India Products, Korea Products and Machinery & Industrial Supplies do not have print editions.
