= Barton Kyle Yount =

United States Army Air Forces general

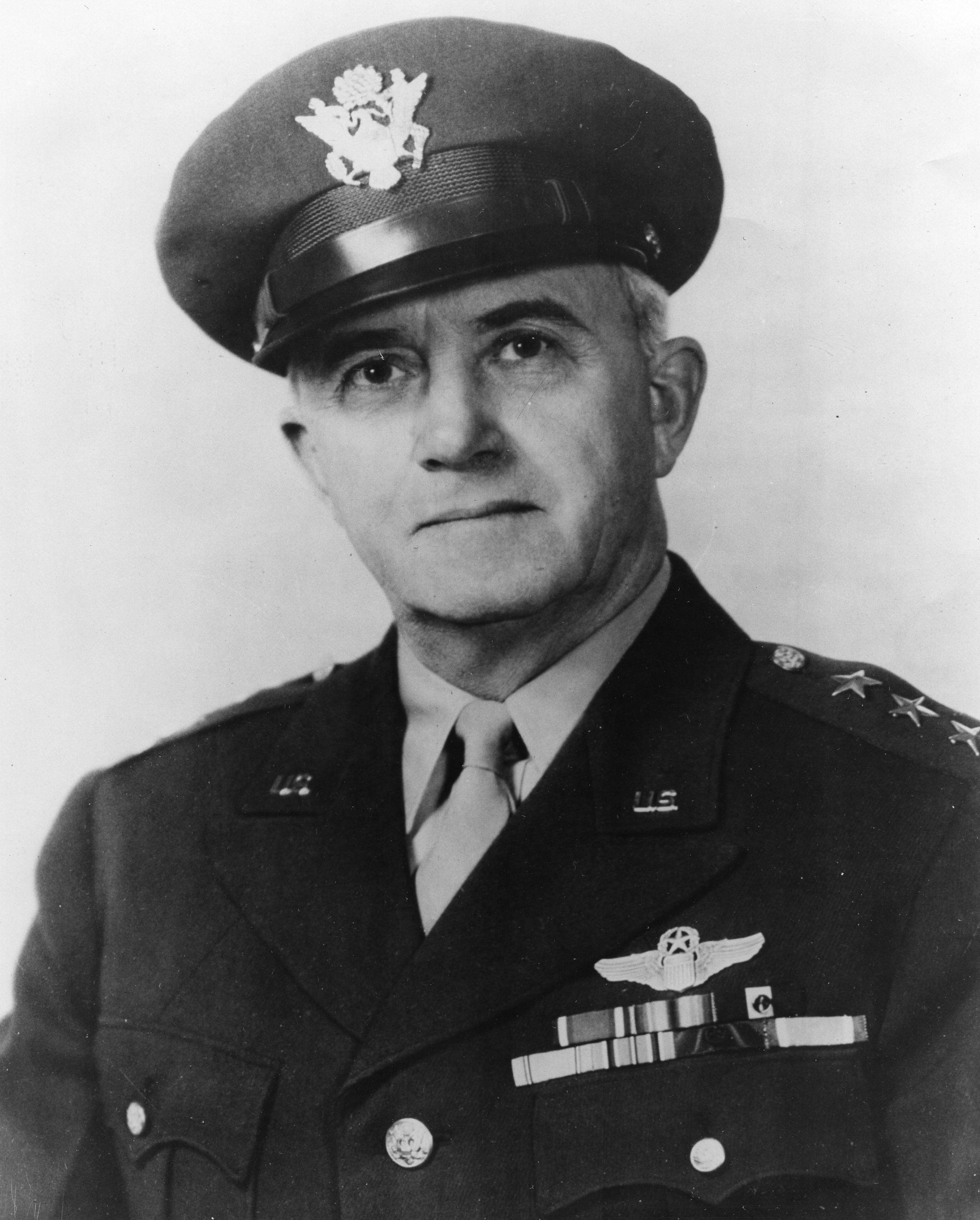
- Born: January 18, 1884; Troy, Ohio
- Died: July 11, 1949 (aged 65); Sedona, Arizona
- Burial place: Arlington National Cemetery
- Military career
- Allegiance: United States
- Branch: United States Army
- Service years: 1907–1946
- Rank: Lieutenant General
- Commands: Army Air Forces Training Command
- Conflicts: World War I; World War II
- Awards: Distinguished Service Medal; Legion of Merit; Air Medal
- Other work: Founder, Thunderbird School of Global Management

Barton Kyle Yount (January 18, 1884 – July 11, 1949) was a United States Army lieutenant general. His most important assignments were carried out in military aviation as a member of the U.S. Army Air Forces.

== Biography ==
Yount was born in Troy, Ohio. He was a student at the Ohio State University from 1902 to 1903 and then commenced studies at the United States Military Academy, from which he graduated in 1907.

Yount was commissioned as a second lieutenant in the 27th Infantry Regiment, and carried out assignments in Cuba, at Ft. Wayne, Michigan, Fort Sheridan, Illinois, on a mapping detail along the Canada–US border, and with 4th Brigade, 2nd Division in Texas City, Texas. In 1914 he transferred to the 15th Infantry Regiment and served in Tianjin, China. In 1917 he was assigned as Military Attaché in Beijing, China.

In late 1917 Yount transferred to the Signal Corps' Temporary Aviation Section, with duty at Kelly Field in San Antonio, Texas. An early leader in military aviation, later that year he was assigned to command the School of Military Aeronautics in Austin, Texas. During World War I, Yount carried out aviation assignments as commander of Camp Dick in Dallas, Texas, at the Department of Military Aeronautics, in Washington, D.C. and at Rockwell Field, California.

Yount took command of March Field, California in 1919 and served until 1921. From 1921 to 1924, he was assigned to the Office of the Chief of Air Corps. He graduated from the Air Corps Engineering School in 1925, afterward carrying out a four-year tour as Assistant Military Attaché for Aviation in Paris, France.

In 1930, he graduated from Air Corps Tactical School at Langley Field, Virginia. Yount commanded Rockwell Air Depot, California, until July 1932, when he assumed command of Bolling Field, Washington, D.C. In 1935, he graduated from the Army Industrial College, and in 1936 he graduated from the Army War College. He then assumed command of Hickham Field, Hawaii, being promoted to brigadier general. In 1938, he was appointed Assistant Chief of the Army Air Corps in Washington, D.C. In 1940, Yount was assigned to command Army Air Forces in Panama, but just a month later was reassigned to command the Southeast Air District, Tampa, Florida, being promotion to major general.

He commanded the West Coast Air Corps Training Center at Moffett Field, California, from 1941 to 1942. From 1942 to 1943, he commanded the Army Air Forces Flying Training Command at Fort Worth, Texas. In 1943, he was named as Commanding General, Army Air Forces Training Command, as a lieutenant general, where he served until his 1946 retirement. Yount's training methods and emphasis on safety were credited with the successful training of hundreds of thousands of pilots from all branches of the U.S. military, an important component to Allied success in World War II.

After retiring from the military, Yount founded and served as President of the American Institute for Foreign Trade, a Glendale, Arizona school he created at the site of the former Thunderbird Field military base, which he purchased after it was closed following World War II. The school is now known as the Thunderbird School of Global Management, and is the oldest and largest graduate school in the U.S. that focuses on preparing international business leaders.

Yount died at Oak Creek Lodge in Sedona, Arizona and was buried at Arlington National Cemetery, Section 30, Grave 1047-RH. His awards and decorations included two Distinguished Service Medals, the Legion of Merit, and the Air Medal.

He was the father of Colonel Barton K. Yount, Jr. (1919–1969), an Air Force pilot who served in World War II, the Korean War and the Vietnam War, receiving the Distinguished Flying Cross. Yount's wife, Mildred, chaired the selection committee that in 1939 chose the winning entry of The U.S. Air Force Song.

== Sources ==
- Biographical Register of the Officers and Graduates of the U.S. Military Academy at West Point, New York, George W. Cullum, 1920, Supplement, Volume VI-B, page 1312
- Newspaper article, Trainer of War Fliers, Colonel Yount Takes Onerous Post at Bolling Field, New York Times, November 13, 1932
- Newspaper article, General Yount Is Named Assistant Army Air Chief, New York Times, July 20, 1938
- Newspaper article, 112 Promotions add 84 Generals to Army Roster, 28 Get Boost to Rank of Major General, Chicago Daily Tribune, September 28, 1940
- Newspaper article, Army Shifts Air Commands, California Fields Get New Chief in Move Due to Rapid Expansion, Los Angeles Times, July 20, 1941
- Newspaper article, Two Air Commands Combined by Army: General Yount Will Direct Flying and Technical Training, July 10, 1943
- Newspaper article, War Training Cuts Air Accident Rate: Gen. Yount's Command Turns Out 100,000 Army Pilots a Year in Increased Safety by Hanson W. Baldwin, October 27, 1943
- Newspaper article, Gen. Barton Yount, Head of Training Command in Recent Conflict Dies: Leader of Foreign Trade Institute, New York Times, July 12, 1949
- Newspaper article, Lt. Gen. Yount, 65, Former Air Force Training Boss, Dies, Chicago Daily Tribune, July 12, 1949
- Newspaper article, Gen. Yount Buried in Arlington, New York Times, July 19, 1949
- U.S. Air Force web site, General Officer Biographies, Barton Kyle Yount page, https://www.af.mil/AboutUs/Biographies/Display/tabid/225/Article/108012/lieutenant-general-barton-kyle-yount.aspx
- Thunderbird School of Global Management Web site, history page, https://web.archive.org/web/20121005172039/http://thunderbird.edu/about_thunderbird/inside_tbird/thunderbird_history.htm
