= Thunderbird Field No. 1 =

Former military airfield in Glendale, Arizona

Thunderbird Field No. 1
- Part of Arizona World War II Army Airfields
- Glendale, Arizona
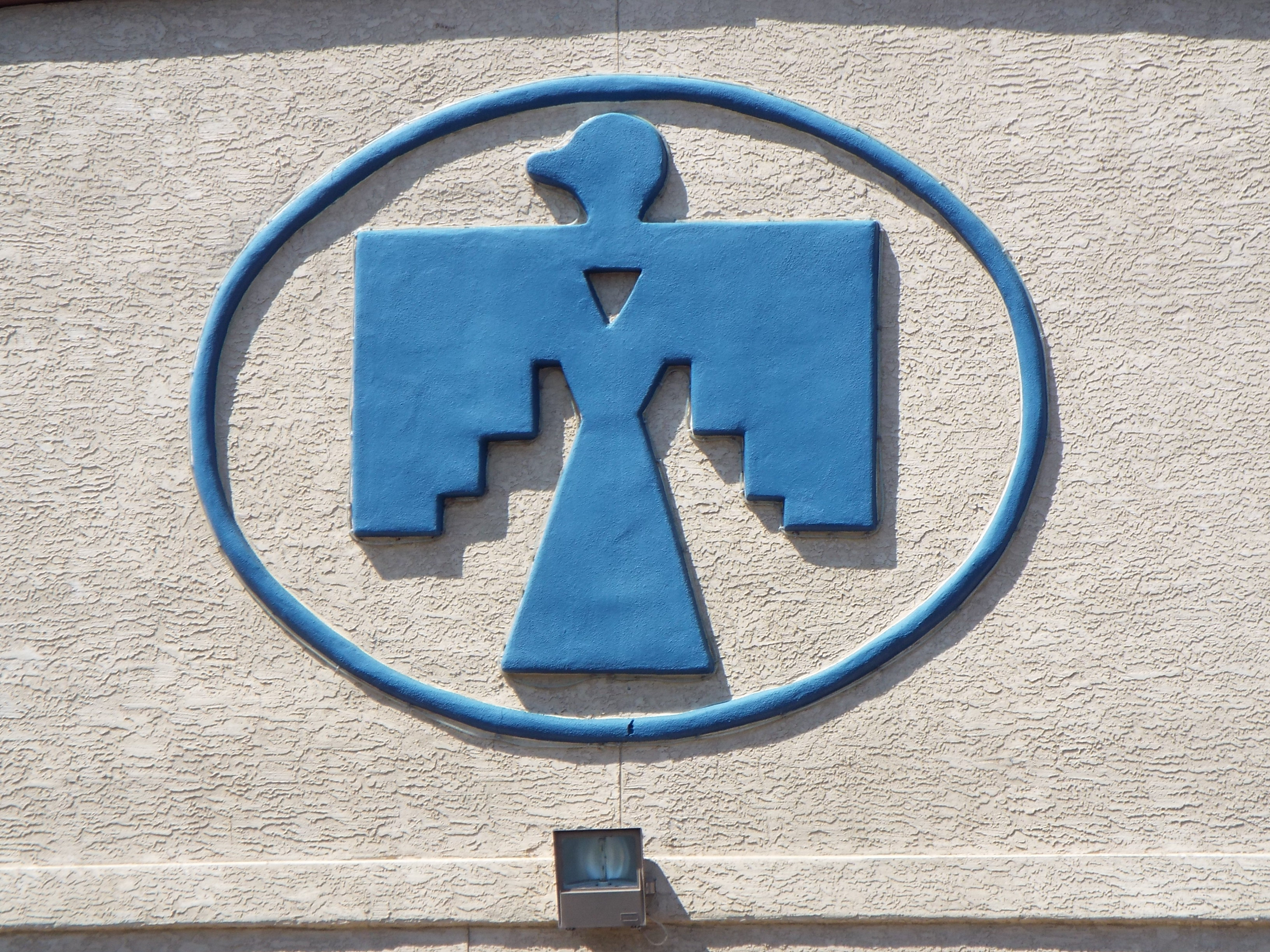
- Thunderbird 1 Army Air Field emblem

Site information
- Type: USAAF contract flight training school
- Controlled by: Army Air Forces Training Command

Location
- Coordinates: 33°37′22″N 112°11′7″W

Site history
- Built: 1939
- Built by: Del E. Webb Construction Company
- In use: 1941–1944

Thunderbird Field was a military airfield in Glendale, Arizona, used for contract primary flight training of Allied pilots during World War II. Created in part by actor James Stewart, the field became part of the United States Army Air Forces training establishment just prior to American entry into the war and was re-designated Thunderbird Field #1 after establishment of Thunderbird Field#2 at nearby Scottsdale, on 22 June 1942. Thunderbird # 1 is located southeast of the intersection of West Greenway Road & North 59th Avenue in Glendale, Arizona.

After the conclusion of World War II, the property was sold as surplus for educational purposes, eventually becoming Thunderbird School of Global Management, a post-graduate business school. In November 2018 the property was transferred to Arizona Christian University. ACU now operates its undergraduate liberal arts university on the site.

Television producer Gerry Anderson named Thunderbird Field as the inspiration for the naming of the television show Thunderbirds as his brother, Lionel, was once stationed there.

== History ==
Thunderbird Field began in 1939 as a collaborative project by Hollywood agent and producer Leland Hayward, former Air Service pilot John H. "Jack" Connelly, and Life magazine photographer John Swope, founders of Southwest Airways. Backed by investors who included James Stewart, singer-actor Hoagy Carmichael, Cary Grant, Henry Fonda, Robert Taylor, and Margaret Sullavan, construction of the pilot training facility near Glendale, Arizona, began on 2 January 1941, and was completed in three months.

The site, 25 miles (40 km) from central Phoenix, was laid out by artist Millard Sheets to resemble (from the air) an etching of a mythical Ancestral Puebloan Thunderbird. The control tower formed the feathered tail of the bird, the administration buildings and barracks its body, the hangars its wings, and the gardens its head. The installation was situated on the southeast corner of what is now West Greenway Road and North 59th Avenue. To the southeast, adjacent to its single-story sage, cream, and terra cotta-colored buildings of Spanish Colonial rancheria design, was a square 2,800-square-foot (260 m^{2}) ramp area. Across West Greenway Road to the south was the airfield itself with three 3,500-foot (1,100 m) runways.

Contractor Del Webb Construction built a hexagonal barracks, administrative building, mess hall and four hangars on the site, plus twin swimming pools. The US Army Air Forces signed a contract with Southwest Airways to provide instructors and facilities for a primary training school for its aviation cadets in March 1941, beginning with a class of 59 candidates. Eventually 10,000 pilots from 30 nations trained at the field before it was deactivated in June 1945.

A 1942 Hollywood movie in Technicolor, Thunder Birds (directed by William Wellman), was filmed on location at the field in the spring of 1942. Aerial shots clearly show the original Thunderbird design.

Four unpaved satellite airfields were operated by Thunderbird Field between 1942 and 1944:

- Thunderbird #1 Auxiliary Airfield A-1 (33.64N 112.10W), northeast of West Bell Road and North 19th Avenue;
- Thunderbird #1 Auxiliary Airfield A-2 (33.65N 112.24W), in Sun City northwest of West Union Hills Road and North 83rd Avenue;
- Thunderbird #1 Auxiliary Airfield A-3 (33.58N 112.10W), at West Peoria Avenue and North 19th Avenue;
- Thunderbird #1 Auxiliary Airfield A-4, at West Pinnacle Peak Road and North 43rd Avenue.

Southwest Airways expanded the training complex with the building of two other airfields, Falcon Field at Mesa in September 1941, and Thunderbird Field#2 in Scottsdale in June 1942.

== After World War II ==
Following the end of World War II, Thunderbird Field was declared surplus by the War Assets Administration in 1946. That same year, Thunderbird was purchased for $1 from the federal government by Lt. General Barton K. Yount, retired commander of the Army Air Forces Training Command. He established the American Institute for Foreign Trade and became its first president.

Classes began on the site within a few months, but the airfield at Thunderbird may have continued in operation alongside the new school for some time. Thunderbird Field was apparently closed (permanently) at some point within the next year.

Thunderbird Field inspired the name of Thunderbirds, a British mid-1960s television show that used marionettes. The eldest brother of Gerry Anderson, the creator of the show had been stationed at the base and wrote about his experience there.

== Historical structures ==
Today, Arizona Christian University is located on the site of the airport. The campus still contains many original airfield buildings, including the airfield control tower (which has been restored), barracks, and one large airplane hangar.

Thunderbird 1 Army Air Field historic structures

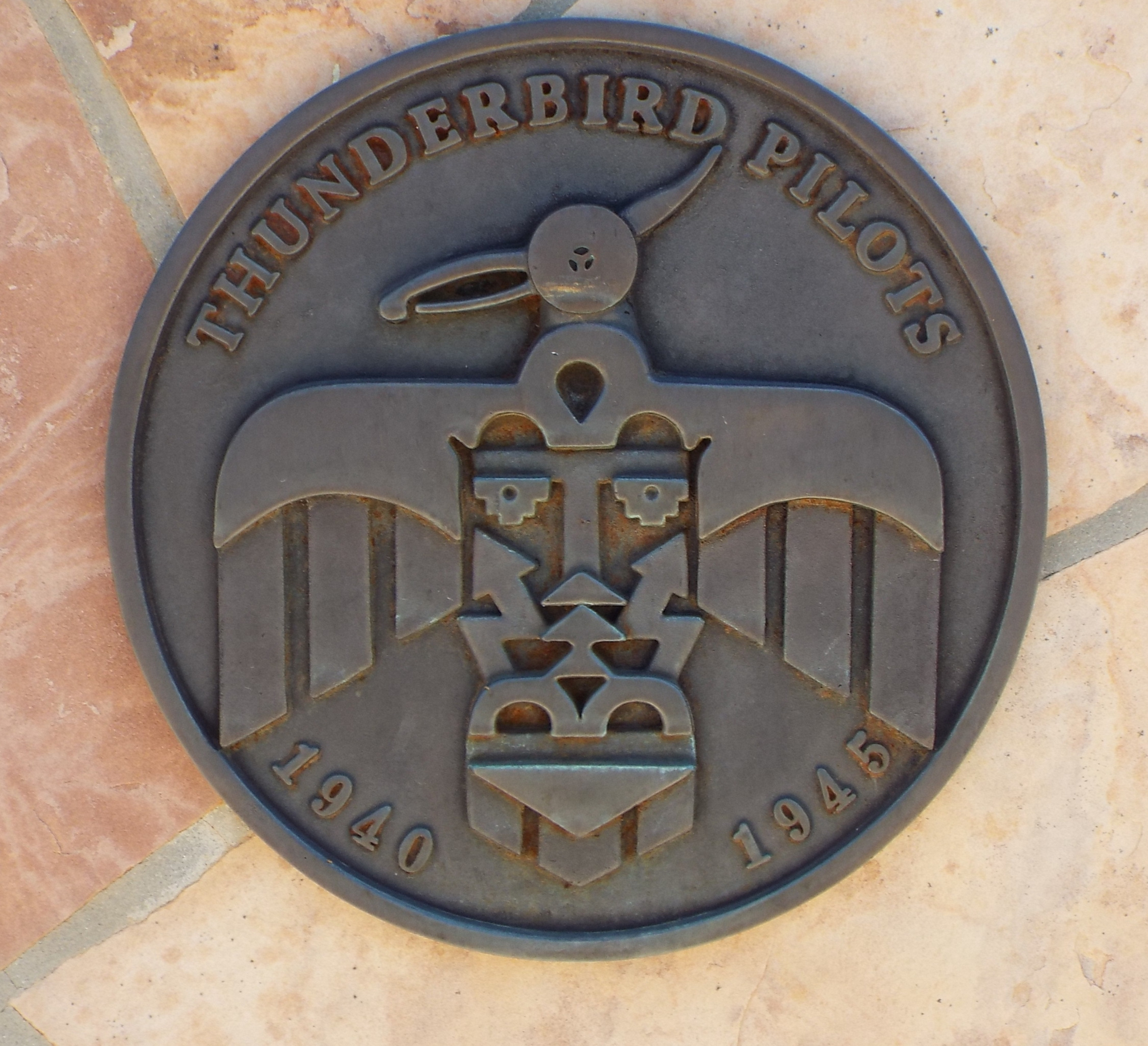
Thunderbird Pilots Memorial Marker

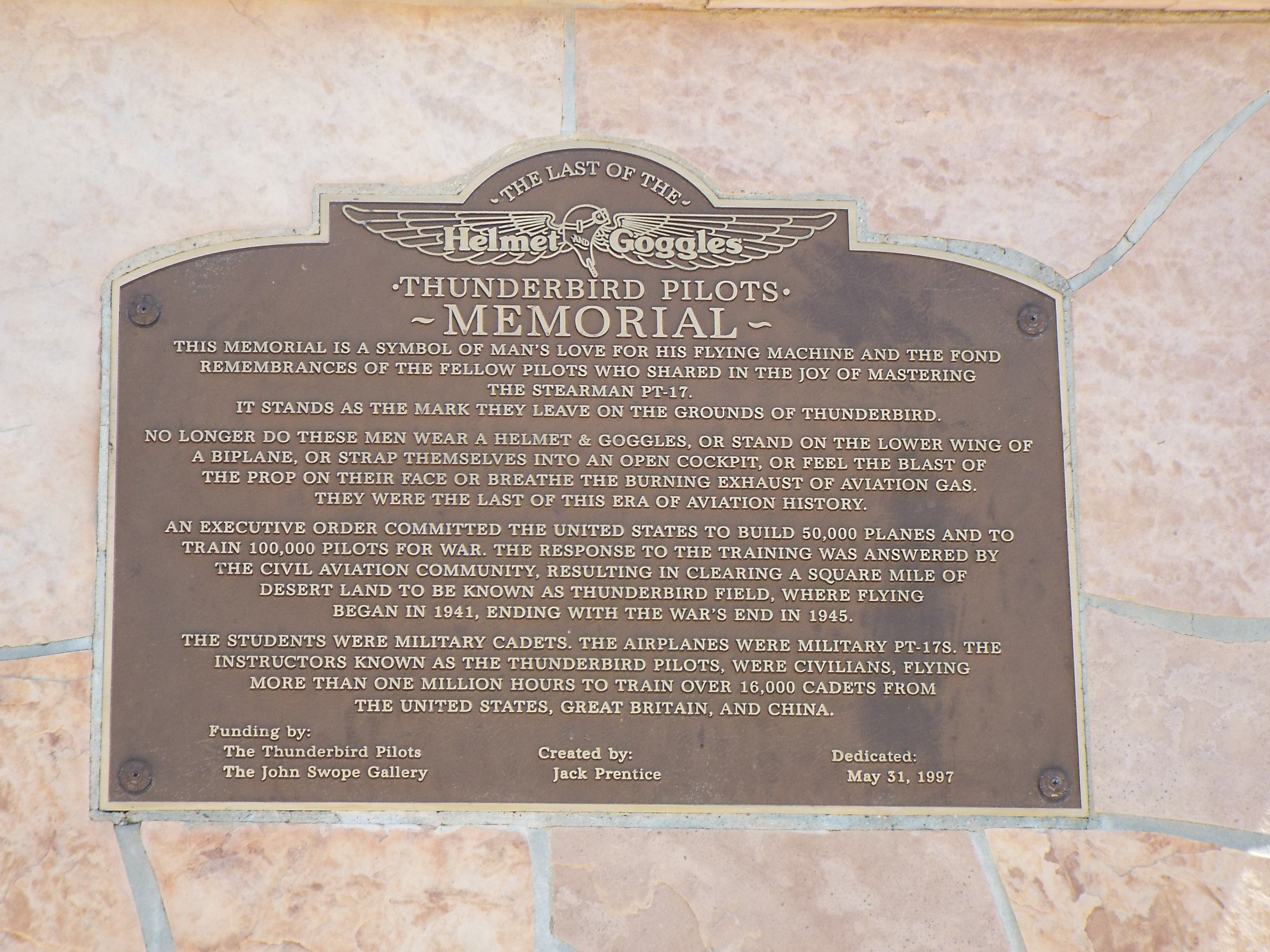
Memorial plaque

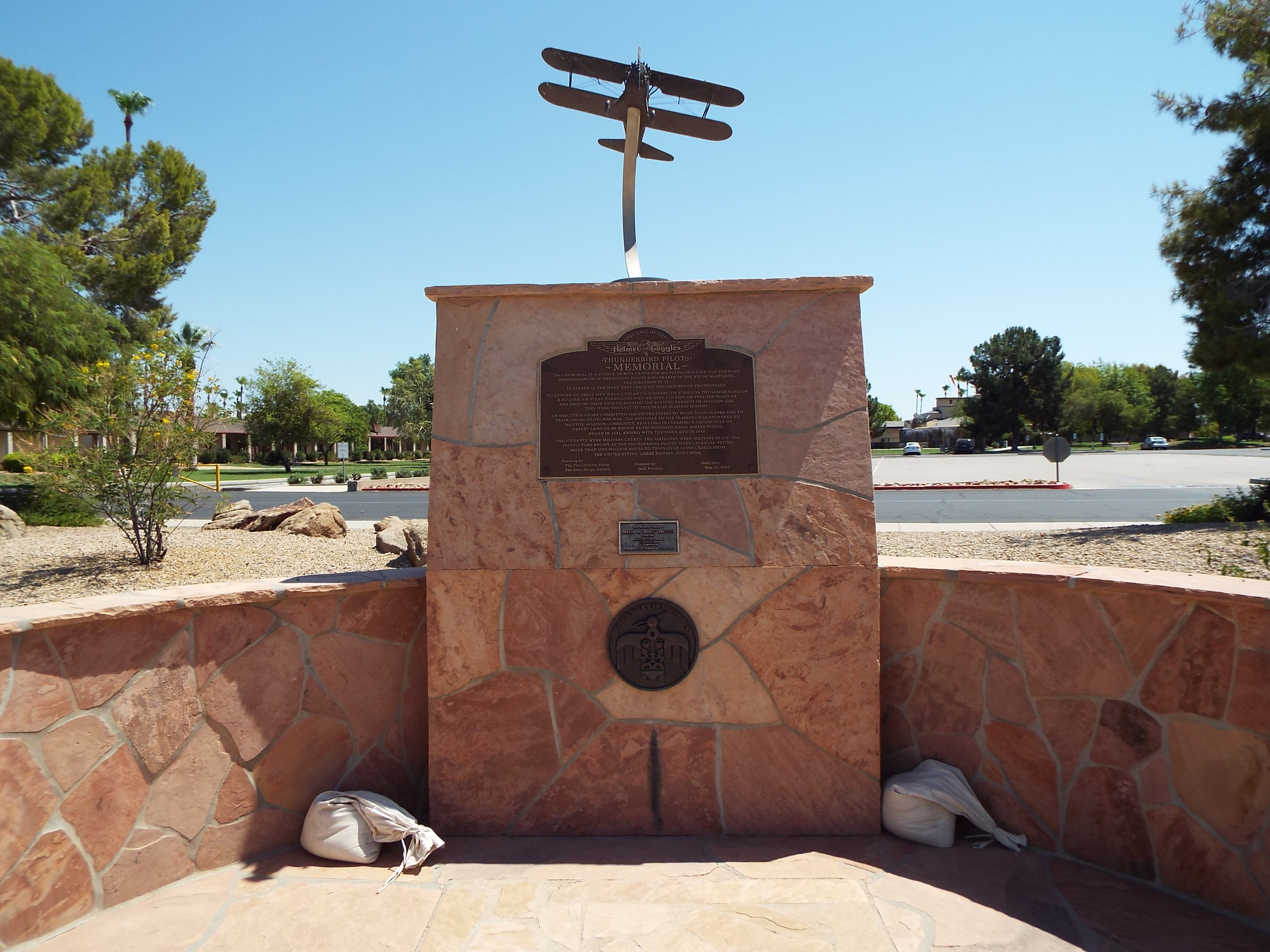
Thunderbird Pilots Memorial dedicated to the pilots who trained there during WW II

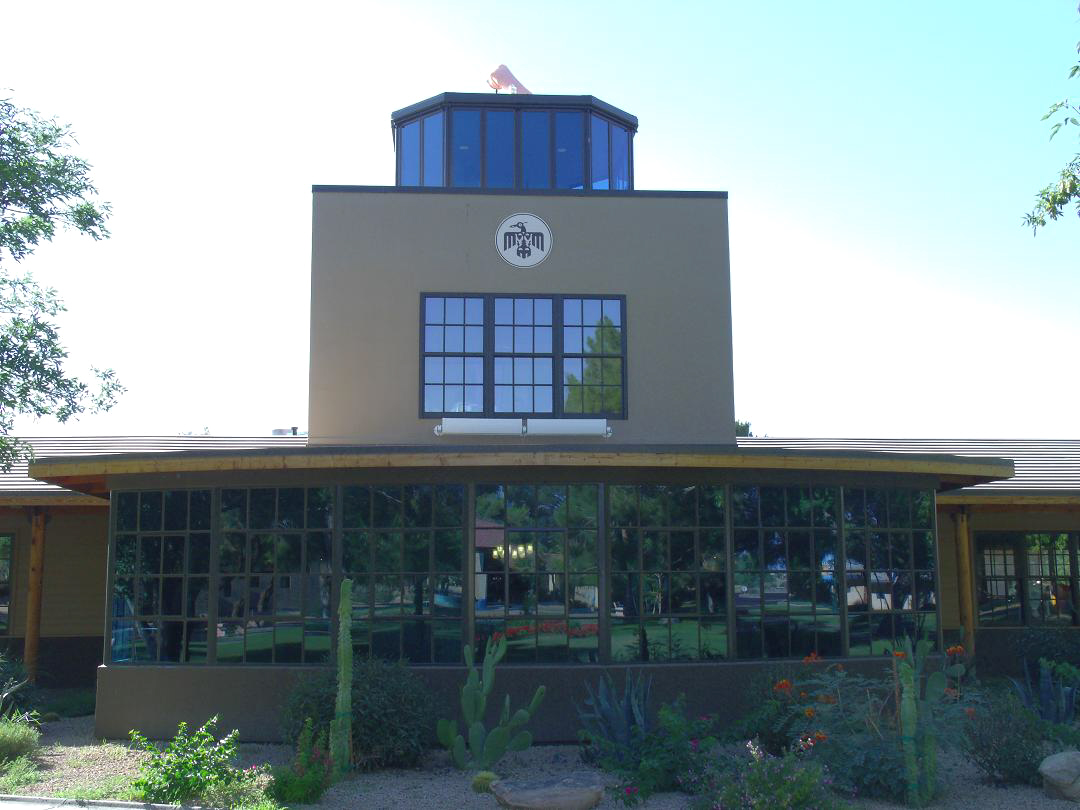
The Thunderbird Control Tower was built in 1941 and served as the Air Control Tower and Officers' quarters during the operation of the airfield.

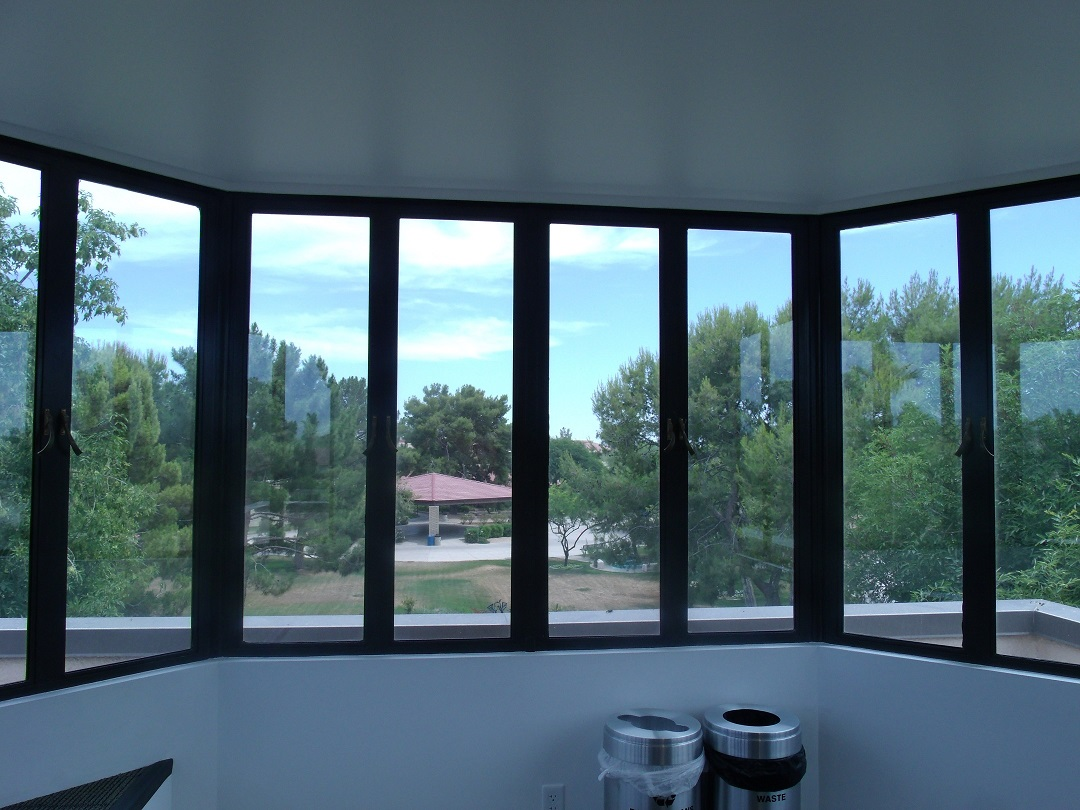
View from the inside of the Thunderbird Control Tower station

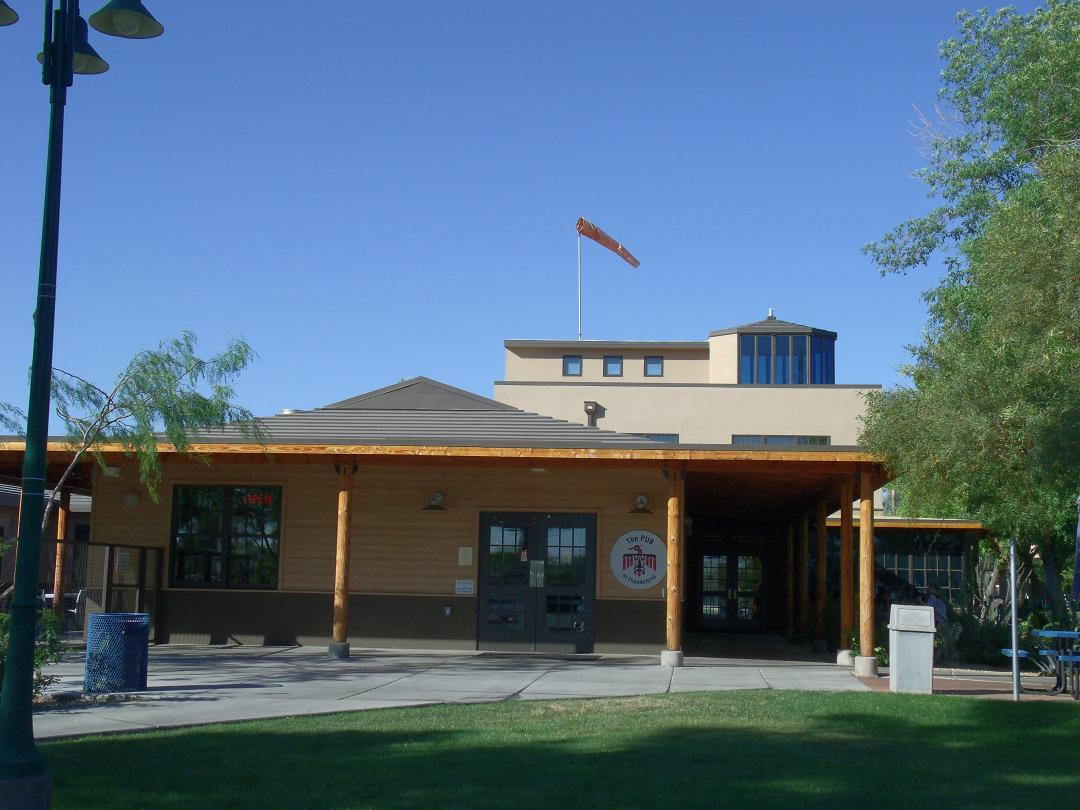
Different view of the Thunderbird Control Tower.

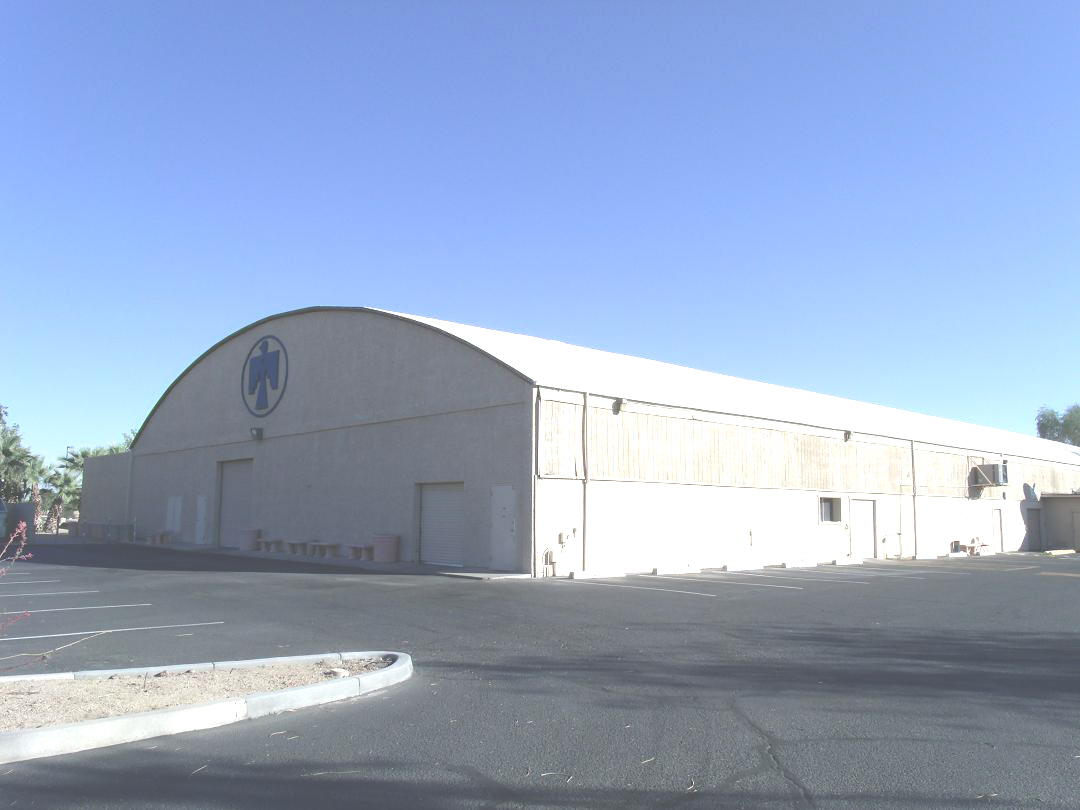
The Thunderbird 1 Army Air Field Airplane Hangar was built in 1941 and belonged to Southwest Airways.

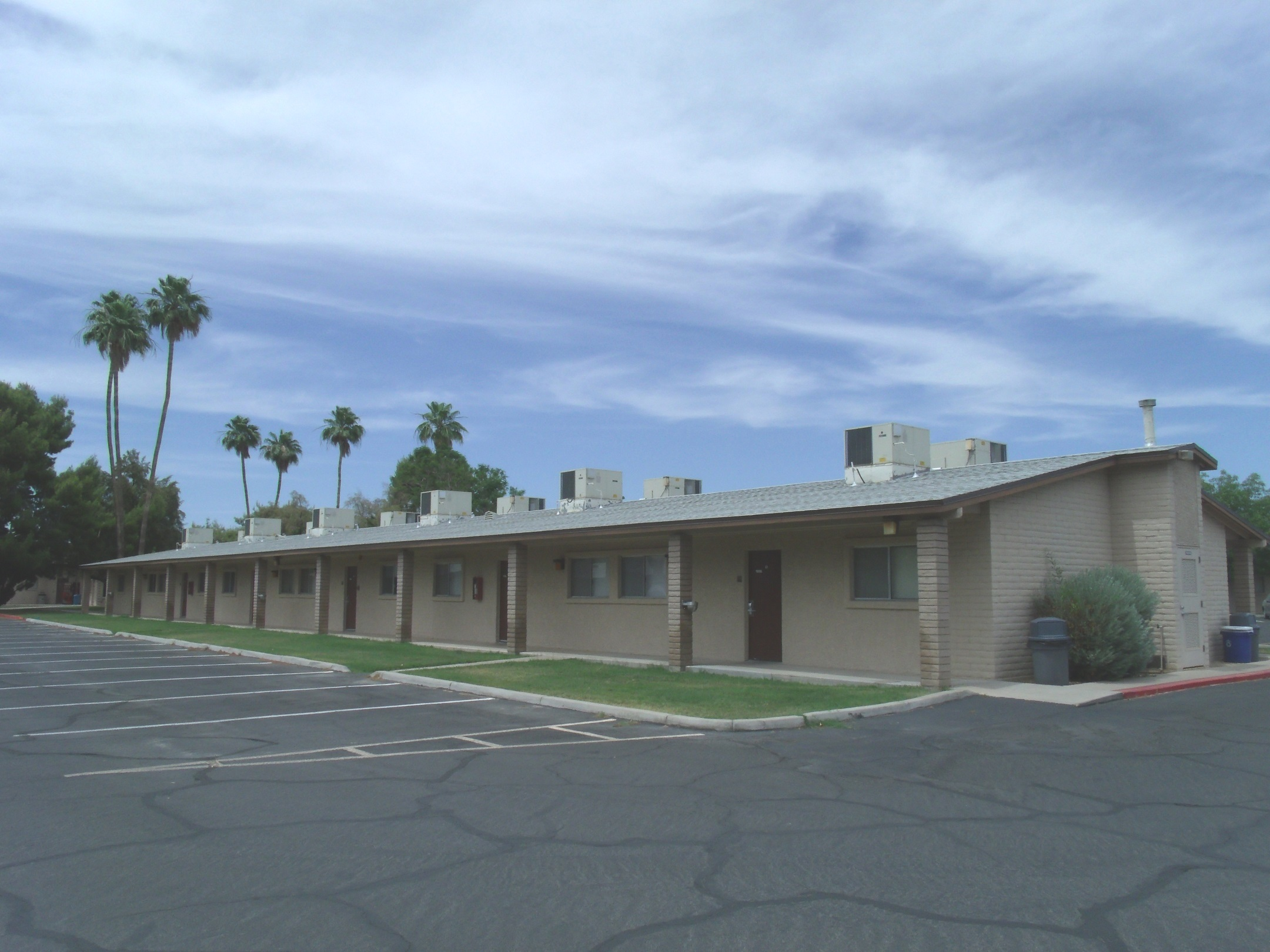
Thunderbird Army Air Field barracks were used during World War II by pilots

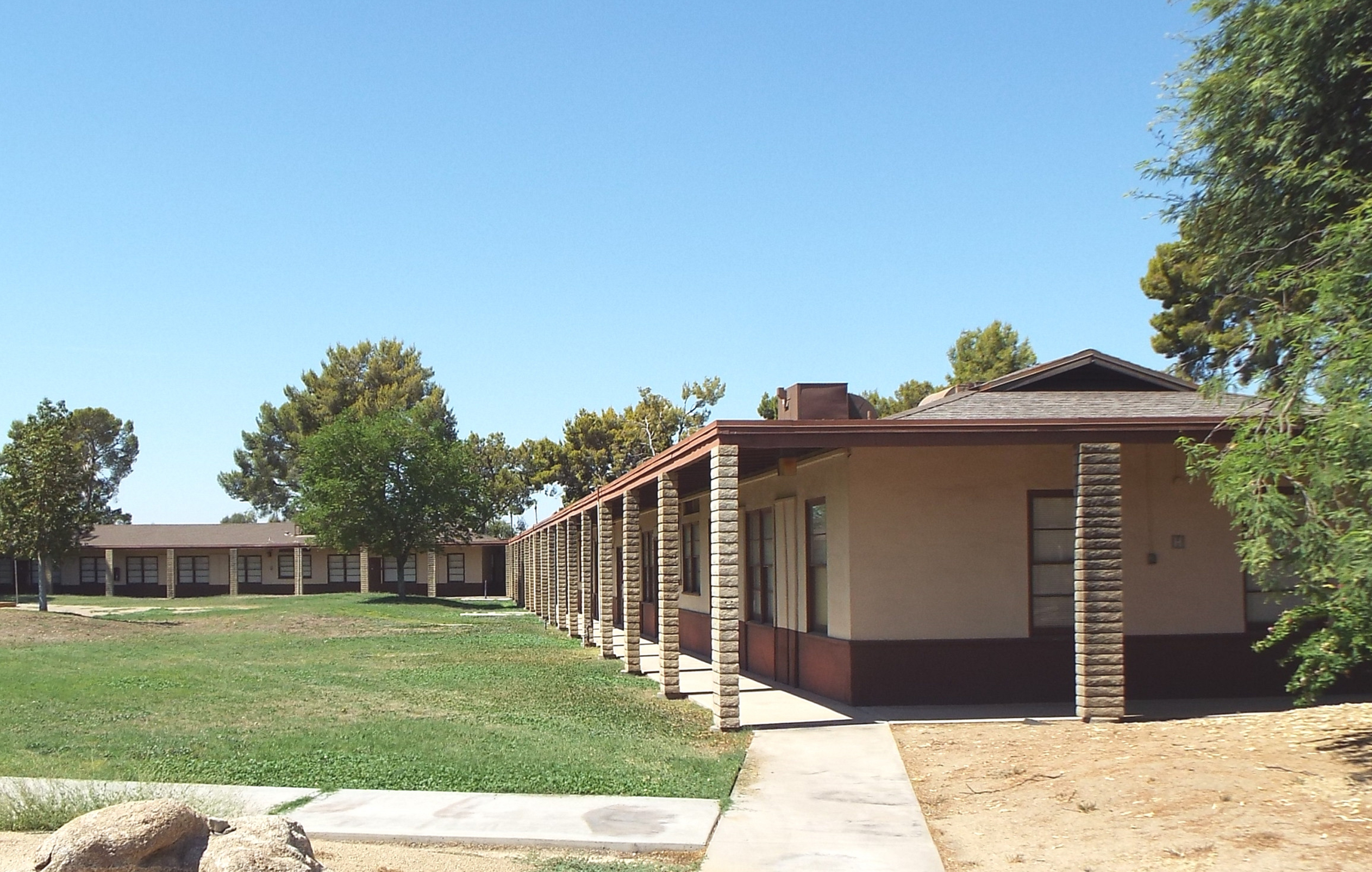
Thunderbird Army Air Field barracks

== See also ==
- Arizona World War II Army Airfields
- 37th Flying Training Wing (World War II)
- List of historic properties in Glendale, Arizona
