= Todd Rustman =

American business executive

- Born: 1969 (age 56–57); Missouri, United States
- Education: Pepperdine University, Thunderbird University
- Occupations: Business executive and writer
- Known for: Founder and managing partner of Clarity Capital Partners
- Spouse: Sherry Rustman
- Children: 2

Todd Rustman (born 1969) is an American business executive and writer. He is the founder and managing partner of Clarity Capital Partners.

== Early life and education ==
Rustman was born in 1970 and grew up in Missouri. He completed high school on a scholarship and later attended Pepperdine University, where he graduated in 1992. He later earned an MBA in international business and finance from Thunderbird University.

== Career ==
Rustman began his career at Long-Term Credit Bank of Japan, subsequently working at PIMCO within institutional roles, and then as a portfolio manager for high-net-worth private clients at Mellon Private Asset Management. After four years at Mellon, he founded GR Capital Asset Management in 2000.

Rustman is also the founder of Levendi Estates, a winery in Napa Valley. He holds leadership positions in several organizations: he is the president of Spectrum Tan, a chain of tanning salons; a board member of GenNext, an organization that engages in political advocacy; and president of two chapters of Wealthy 100.

Rustman is also a licensed pilot.

== Personal life ==
Rustman married Sherry in 2005, and they have two children, Cayden and Sierra, the latter from Sherry's previous marriage.

== Bibliography ==
- Memory Royalties (2023)
