= Flex Ltd. =

Singaporean technology company

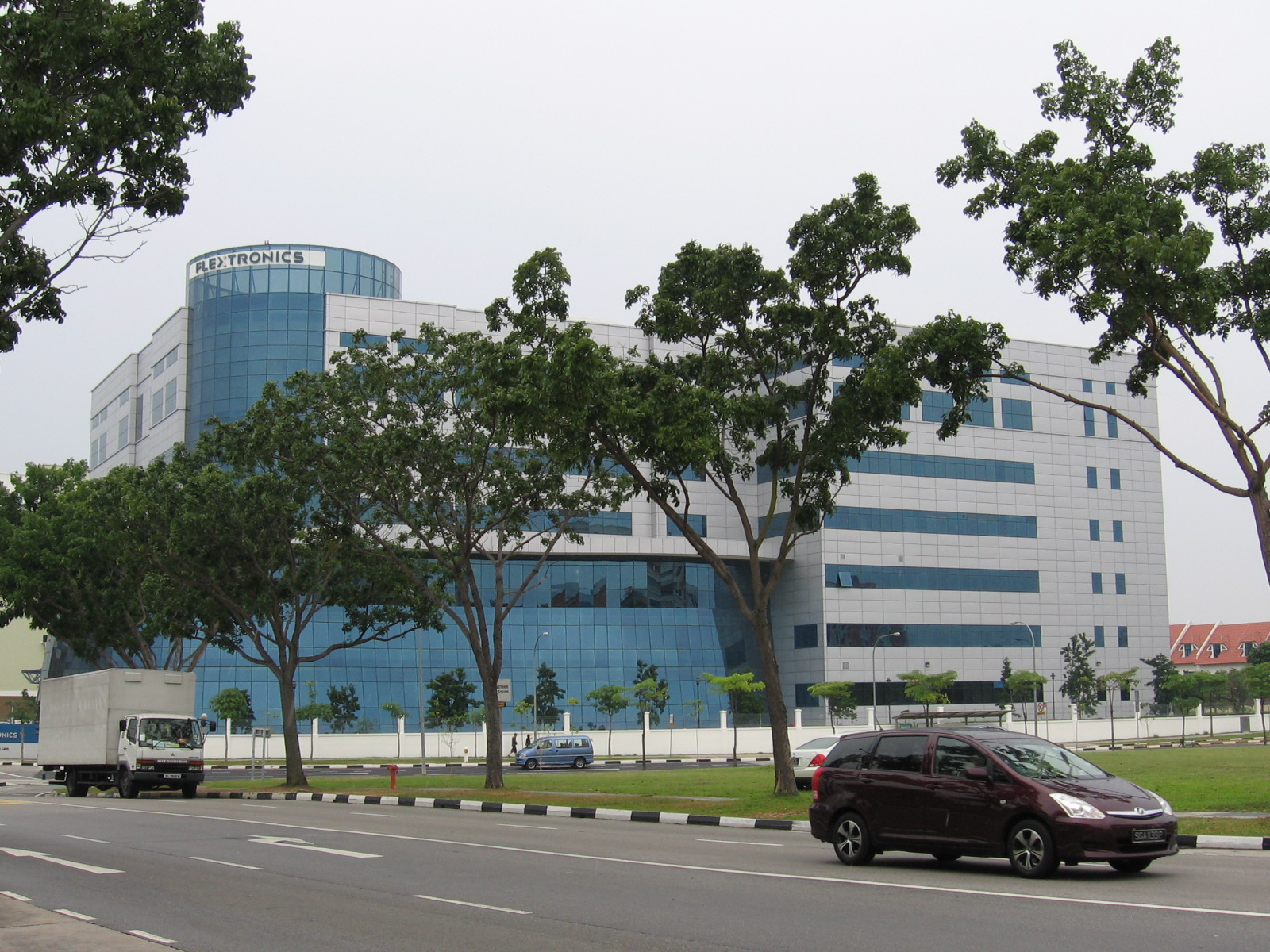
- Flex headquarters in Singapore in 2006
- Formerly: Flextronics International Ltd.
- Type: Public
- Traded as: Nasdaq: FLEX; S&P 500 component
- ISIN: SG9999000020
- Industry: Electronics manufacturing services (EMS); Original design manufacturer (ODM)
- Founded: 25 September 1969; 57 years ago (as Flextronics, Inc.)
- Founders: Joe McKenzie; Barbara Ann McKenzie
- Headquarters: Singapore (legal domicile); Austin, Texas, U.S. (operations)
- Number of locations: 100 (2025)
- Key people: Revathi Advaithi (CEO); Kevin Krumm (CFO); Michael Capellas (chairman)
- Revenue: ▼US$25.81 billion (2025)
- Operating income: ▲US$1.169 billion (2025)
- Net income: ▼US$838 million (2025)
- Total assets: ▲US$18.38 billion (2025)
- Total equity: ▼US$5.002 billion (2025)
- Number of employees: 147,979 (2025)
- Website: flex.com
- Footnotes; Financials as of March 31, 2025.

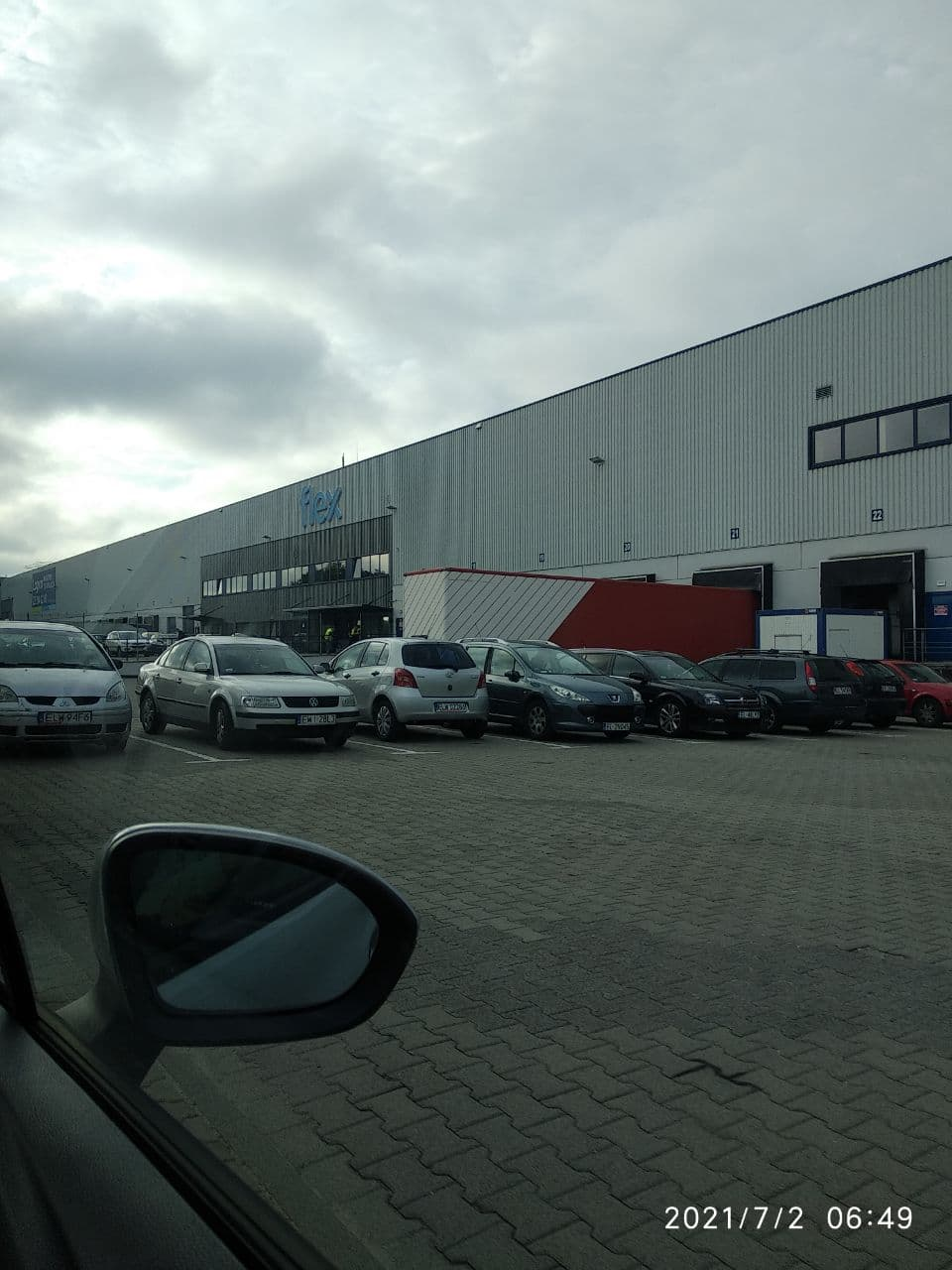
Flex offices/warehouse in Łódź

Flex Ltd. (previously known as Flextronics International Ltd. or Flextronics) is a multinational manufacturing company. It is the world's third largest global electronics manufacturing services (EMS), original design manufacturer (ODM) company by revenue, behind only Pegatron. Flex's U.S. corporate headquarters are located in Austin, Texas, while the legal domicile is located in Singapore. The company has manufacturing operations in over 30 countries, and employs about 172,000 people.

== History ==
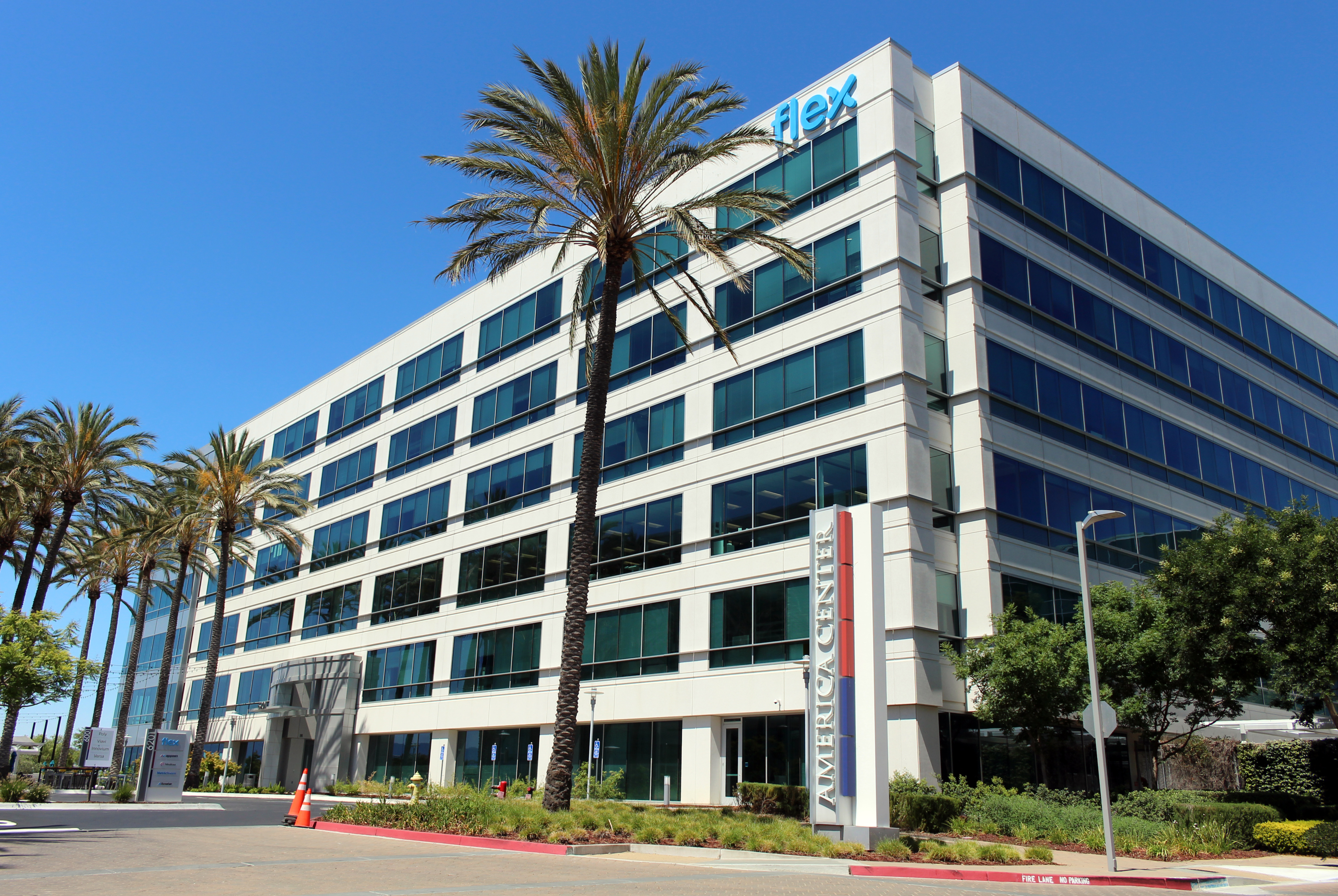
Former U.S. headquarters in San Jose, California

Logo used until 2015

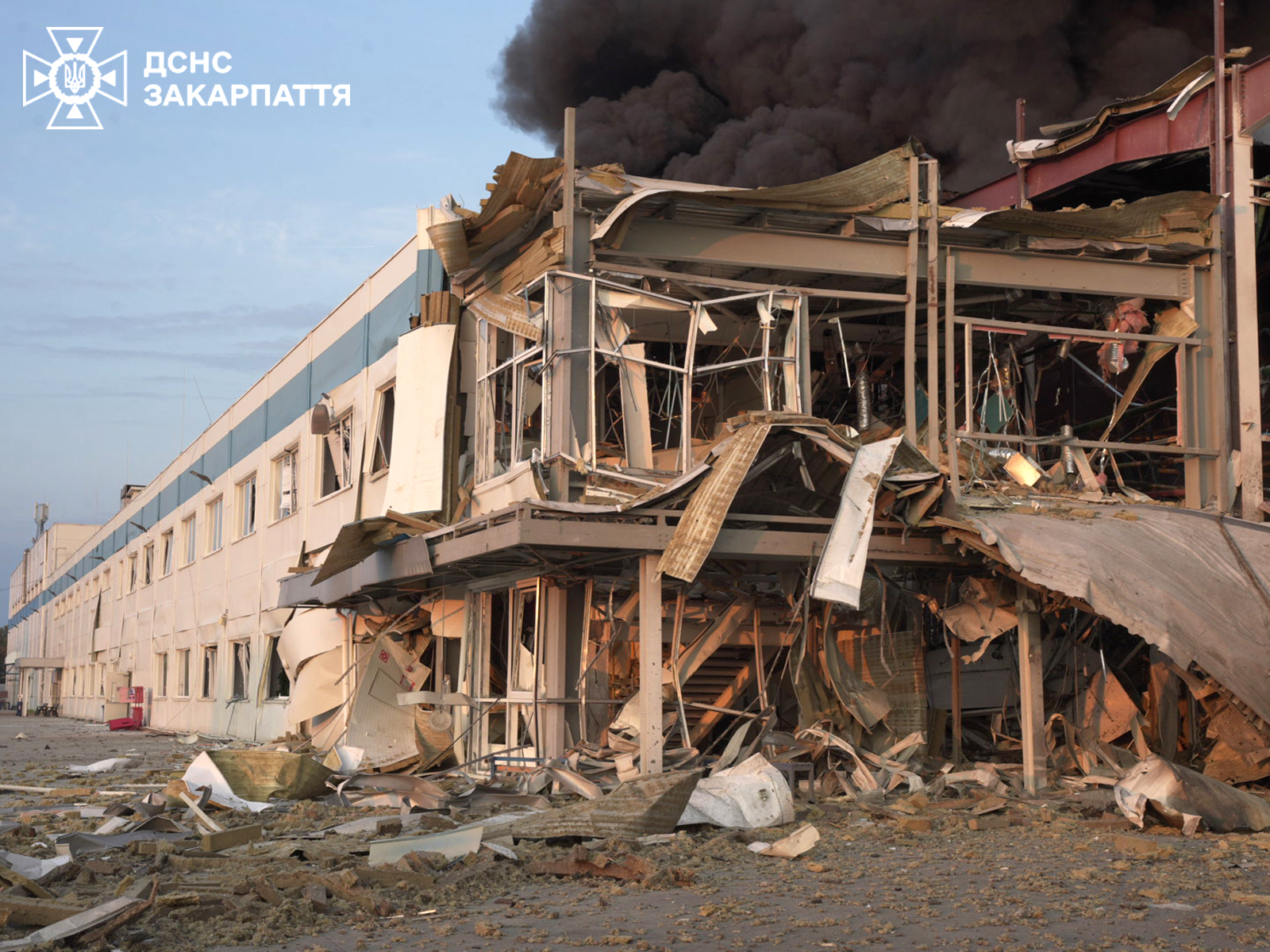
The Flex plant in Mukachevo, Ukraine after the Russian attack in 2025

The company was founded in 1969 by Joe and Barbara-Ann McKenzie as Flextronics, Inc.

In 1990, the company was renamed Flextronics International, Ltd. and moved to Singapore. In 1993, the company received venture capital funding through Sequoia Capital, and became a publicly held company again in 1994. In 2000, the company ranked third on "100 Best-Managed Companies" by IndustryWeek. In 2006 Flextronics took over a part of the production of Lego, but in 2009 Lego decided to end relations with Flextronics and purchase the production facilities in Mexico and Hungary. On 4 June 2007, Flextronics offered to purchase Solectron for US$3.6 billion and thus making Solectron a subsidiary of Flextronics. The acquisition of Solectron was completed by end of October 2007, earlier than anticipated.

On 18 March 2009, Flextronics was invited to ring the NASDAQ stock market opening bell, signifying the day's start of trading and celebrated 15-year NASDAQ-listed anniversary. Mike McNamara (then-CEO) and a group of top executives represented the company at the ringing of the bell. On 25 August 2009, Flextronics announced that it was chosen by LG Electronics (LGE), a global provider of advanced digital products and applied technologies, to manufacture 19, 22, 26, 32, and 37-inch LCD television receivers at its Ciudad Juárez, Mexico facility for distribution to the North and South American markets. On 2 September 2009, Flextronics announced that Multek received Danaher Test and Measurement's 2009 Outstanding Supplier Award. The award was given based on quality, delivery performance, engineering support and cost for work with two of Danaher's business units, Tektronix and Fluke.

On 15 September 2010, Flextronics announced that it had been chosen by Brammo, Inc., former producer of electric traction motors and traction batteries, to be its manufacturing partner for the production and distribution of plug-in electric motorcycles and components. In 2010, the company signed an agreement with Lenovo to provide manufacturing for Europe. That same year, Flextronics also signed an agreement with Brammo to provide acquisition and manufacturing in North America, Asia and Europe.

In 2012, Flextronics incubated Elementum, a start-up supply chain management (SCM) company based in Mountain View, California. In 2014, Elementum was spun off from Flextronics as its own separate entity.

In 2013, Flextronics began making the Mac Pro for Apple in Texas.

In 2014, Flextronics was named as the manufacturer of the Fitbit Force by the US Consumer Product Safety Commission in the context of a complete recall of the product due to rashes developing on the wrists of its users.

In July 2015 the company announced it changed the company name from Flextronics to Flex.

In September 2015, Flex acquired Nextpower (then known as Nextracker), one of the leading solar tracker companies, for $330 million.

In November 2015, Flex, acquired Wink smart home platform to bring the Intelligence of Things "Home". Flex has been a strategic partner to Wink, serving as their primary supplier of hardware and firmware, including the Wink Hub and Wink Relay, which include core intellectual property developed within Flex. In July 2017, Flex sold Wink to i.am+ for $38.7 million.

On 31 December 2018, Michael M. McNamara resigned as the company's Chief Executive Officer. On 11 February 2019, Flex announced Revathi Advaithi as CEO. Prior to Flex, Advaithi was president and chief operating officer for the Electrical Sector business for Eaton Corporation.

On August 21, 2025 a Flex manufacturing site operating in Mukachevo, Ukraine, since 2012 was hit and extensively damaged by a Russian airstrike.

== Controversies ==
=== Breach of contracts ===
Flextronics was sued for breach of contract with Beckman Coulter Inc., a maker of medical devices. The case dates from 1997, when Beckman Coulter entered into an agreement with Dovatron, a unit of the Dii Group, to provide circuit boards for a Beckman blood analyser. Flextronics acquired the Dii Group in 1999 and, according to Beckman, shortly thereafter Flextronics refused to provide the circuit boards unless it bought other electronic components from the company.

Beckman filed suit in early 2001, seeking $2.2 million in damages, which were cited as the costs incurred in having to retool one of its plants to manufacture the circuit boards in-house. At the end of the trial, Flextronics paid $23 million for the damages.

=== Leak of USB charger confidential shipment data ===
A former Flextronics executive pleaded guilty to committing wire fraud and security fraud by providing confidential information related to USB charger shipment data used for U.S. based iPhones and iPods in 2009.

=== Seizure of Huawei goods over tariff war ===
According to a 2019 report, Flex produced smartphone and 5G base stations for Huawei, and when the US added Huawei to its Entity List on May 16, Flex kept Huawei's assets at its factory in Zhuhai.

This included production equipment, raw materials, and half-made products worth approximately 700 million yuan ($101.85 million). These goods were held up for over a month, however Huawei was able to retrieve some of the goods worth 400 million yuan through third-party channels in June 2019.
