= Walid Chammah =

American businessman

Walid A. Chammah
- Born: April 12, 1954 (age 72); Lebanon
- Education: American University of Beirut; Thunderbird School of Global Management
- Occupations: Partner of Chammah & Partners
- Employer(s): Chammah & Partners LLC
- Known for: Co-President of Morgan Stanley & Co & Chairman of Morgan Stanley International Morgan Stanley (1993-2012)
- Title: Partner of Chammah & Partners
- Board member of: American University of Beirut Bucherer USA and an Advisory Board member of Signa Holding
- Spouse: Karin Zumtobel-Chammah (1999-present)
- Children: 4

Walid A. Chammah (born April 12, 1954, Beirut, Lebanon) is the former co-president of Morgan Stanley & Co. and Chairman of Morgan Stanley International. He retired from the Firm in early 2012 after serving Morgan Stanley for over 19 years, including overseeing the Firm's Global Institutional Securities business and operations, and serving as a member of both the Management and Operating Committees.

== Career ==
Prior to joining Morgan Stanley, Chammah was a managing director at The First Boston Corporation and was responsible for U.S. Taxable Fixed Income Capital Markets and the Structured Finance Groups. Chammah led the asset finance business in the mid-eighties and early nineties and is considered a pioneer in developing the ABS market and all aspects of non-mortgage securitization. Chammah became a partner in 1987.

Chammah sits on the Boards of the American University of Beirut and Bucherer USA; he is an advisory board member of SIGNA Group, and HEC Montreal and a senior policy advisor for I Squared Capital.

He was previously a member of the IMF's Financial Institutions Consultative Group, and is a former board member of the British American Business (BAB) Council, Rosneft Bank and Sovcomflot (2015 - February 2022).

Walid A Chammah is a partner of Chammah and Partners. The firm provides financial advice to institutions and private clients.

== Early life and education ==
A native of Lebanon, Chammah graduated from the American University of Beirut with a Bachelor of Business Administration in 1976 and received a master's degree in International Management from American Graduate School of International Management (now known as the Thunderbird School of Global Management) in 1977.
