= Global Sources =

Hong Kong multichannel media company

Global Sources Limited
- Type: Public
- Industry: E-commerce, Publishing, Trade shows
- Founded: 1971
- Founder: Merle A. Hinrich
- Headquarters: Hong Kong, China
- Key people: James Liu, CEO
- Owner: Blackstone
- Parent: Clarion Events

Global Sources (Chinese: 環球資源) is a Hong Kong-based business-to-business (B2B) multichannel media company that serves buyers and suppliers online and offline since 1971. Its core business facilitates trade between suppliers and buyers, through trade shows, online marketplaces, the management magazine Chief Executive China, apps and other virtual products.

Global Sources organizes many professional sourcing fairs in Hong Kong every year in response to the development of Guangdong-Hong Kong-Macao Greater Bay Area. These include the world 's largest electronic product sourcing fair - Global Sources Electronics, Indonesia which connects China with Southeast Asia market under the “Belt and Road Initiative”.

The company launched its China Sourcing Fairs in 2003.

- Global Sources Exhibitions, which bring international buyers face-to-face with suppliers. Specialized shows take place in Hong Kong,
- Private sourcing events, which create opportunities for pre-selected suppliers to meet privately with buyers representing retail chains.
- Global Sources online marketplaces, which allow buyers to contact manufacturers directly for inquiries and purchases.
- Chief Executive China, which feature thousands of informative supplier advertisements. Each of the 16 industry titles provides reports on new products and trends in sourcing. Print, digital and mobile app editions are available.

In February 2018, UK-based Clarion Events (owned by The Blackstone Group) completed its acquisition of Global Sources supported by Blackstone.

In July 2018, Hu Wei, formerly President of Reed Exhibitions Greater China, was appointed as the CEO of Global Sources.

In 2025, James Liu joined Global Sources, and currently is the chief executive officer of the company.

== Global Sources and the Digital Age ==
In recent years, Global Sources has significantly expanded its digital presence to cater to the evolving needs of its global customer base. The company's online marketplaces have become increasingly sophisticated, offering features such as virtual trade shows, live product demonstrations, and AI-powered product matching. Additionally, Global Sources has invested in mobile apps to provide buyers with on-the-go access to supplier information, product catalogs, and real-time market updates. By embracing digital technologies, Global Sources aims to further streamline the sourcing process and connect buyers and suppliers more efficiently than ever before.
