= List of airports in Arizona =

This is a list of airports in Arizona (a U.S. state), grouped by type and sorted by location. It contains all public-use and military airports in the state. Some private-use and former airports may be included where notable, such as airports that were previously public-use, those with commercial enplanements recorded by the FAA or airports assigned an IATA airport code.

== Airports ==
This list contains the following information:

- **City served** – The city generally associated with the airport, as per the airport's master record with the Federal Aviation Administration. This is not always the actual location since some airports are located in smaller towns outside of the city they serve. It is not meant to be a complete list of cities served, which can be found in or added to each airport's Wikipedia article.
- **FAA** – The location identifier assigned by the Federal Aviation Administration (FAA). These are linked to each airport's page at the Arizona Department of Transportation.
- **IATA** – The airport code assigned by the International Air Transport Association (IATA). Those that do not match the FAA code are shown in bold.
- **ICAO** – The location indicator assigned by the International Civil Aviation Organization (ICAO).
- **Airport name** – The official airport name. Those shown in **bold** indicate the airport has scheduled passenger service on commercial airlines.
- **Role** – One of four FAA airport categories, as per the 2023–2027 National Plan of Integrated Airport Systems (NPIAS) report released September 2022:
  - P-s: Commercial service – primary are publicly owned airports that receive scheduled passenger service and have more than 10,000 passenger boardings (enplanements) each year. Each primary airport is sub-classified by the FAA as one of the following four "hub" types (s):
    - L: Large hub that accounts for at least 1% of total U.S. passenger enplanements.
    - M: Medium hub that accounts for between 0.25% and 1% of total U.S. passenger enplanements.
    - S: Small hub that accounts for between 0.05% and 0.25% of total U.S. passenger enplanements.
    - N: Nonhub that accounts for less than 0.05% of total U.S. passenger enplanements, but more than 10,000 annual enplanements.
  - CS: Commercial service – nonprimary are publicly owned airports that receive scheduled passenger service and have at least 2,500 passenger boardings each year.
  - R: Reliever airports are designated by the FAA to relieve congestion at a large commercial service airport and to provide more general aviation access to the overall community.
  - GA: General aviation airports are the largest single group of airports in the U.S. airport system. They are public-use airports that do not have scheduled service or have scheduled service with less than 2,500 passenger boardings each year.
- **Enplanements** – The number of enplanements (commercial passenger boardings) that occurred at the airport in calendar year 2024, as per FAA records released 2025.

City served	FAA	IATA	ICAO	Airport name	Role	Enplanements (2024)
				**Commercial service – primary airports**		
Flagstaff	FLG	FLG	KFLG	**Flagstaff Pulliam Airport**	P-N	79,081
Mesa	IWA	**AZA**	KIWA	**Mesa Gateway Airport** (formerly Williams AFB)	P-S	978,296
Page	PGA	PGA	KPGA	**Page Municipal Airport**	P-N	22,400
Phoenix	PHX	PHX	KPHX	**Phoenix Sky Harbor International Airport**	P-L	25,595,723
Prescott	PRC	PRC	KPRC	**Prescott Municipal Airport** (Ernest A. Love Field)	P-N	25,316
Tucson	TUS	TUS	KTUS	**Tucson International Airport**	P-S	1,959,789
Yuma	NYL	**YUM**	KNYL	**Yuma International Airport** / MCAS Yuma	P-N	85,227
				**Commercial service – nonprimary airports**		
Show Low	SOW	SOW	KSOW	**Show Low Regional Airport**	CS	3,655
				**Reliever airports**		
Chandler	CHD	CHD	KCHD	Chandler Municipal Airport	R	42
Glendale	GEU		KGEU	Glendale Municipal Airport	R	36
Goodyear	GYR	GYR	KGYR	Phoenix Goodyear Airport	R	8
Marana (near Tucson)	AVQ	**AVW**	KAVQ	Marana Regional Airport	R	14
Mesa	FFZ	**MSC**	KFFZ	Falcon Field	R	17
Phoenix	DVT	DVT	KDVT	Phoenix Deer Valley Airport	R	102
Scottsdale	SDL	**SCF**	KSDL	**Scottsdale Airport**	R	46,524
Tucson	RYN	RYN	KRYN	Ryan Airfield	R	0
				**General aviation airports**		
Ajo	P01			Eric Marcus Municipal Airport	GA	0
Bagdad	E51	BGT		Bagdad Airport	GA	79
Benson	E95			Benson Municipal Airport	GA	0
Bisbee	P04	BSQ		Bisbee Municipal Airport	GA	0
Buckeye	BXK	BXK	KBXK	Buckeye Municipal Airport	GA	0
Bullhead City	IFP	IFP	KIFP	Laughlin/Bullhead International Airport	GA	68,837
Casa Grande	CGZ	CGZ	KCGZ	Casa Grande Municipal Airport	GA	2
Chinle	E91			Chinle Municipal Airport	GA	0
Cibecue	Z95			Cibecue Airport	GA	0
Clifton / Morenci	CFT	CFT	KCFT	Greenlee County Airport	GA	68
Colorado City	AZC		KAZC	Colorado City Municipal Airport	GA	96
Coolidge	P08			Coolidge Municipal Airport	GA	0
Cottonwood	P52	CTW		Cottonwood Airport	GA	0
Douglas / Bisbee	DUG	DUG	KDUG	Bisbee Douglas International Airport	GA	0
Eloy	E60			Eloy Municipal Airport	GA	0
Gila Bend	E63			Gila Bend Municipal Airport	GA	0
Globe	P13			San Carlos Apache Airport	GA	8
Grand Canyon	GCN	GCN	KGCN	Grand Canyon National Park Airport	GA	120,222
Holbrook	P14			Holbrook Municipal Airport	GA	0
Kayenta	0V7	MVM		Kayenta Airport	GA	0
Kingman	IGM	IGM	KIGM	Kingman Airport	GA	209
Lake Havasu City	HII	HII	KHII	Lake Havasu City Airport	GA	17
Marana	MZJ	MZJ	KMZJ	Pinal Airpark	GA	0
Maricopa	A39	A39		Ak-Chin Regional Airport	GA	0
Nogales	OLS	OLS	KOLS	Nogales International Airport	GA	0
Parker	P20			Avi Suquilla Airport	GA	0
Payson	PAN	PJB	KPAN	Payson Airport	GA	3
Peach Springs	1G4	GCW		Grand Canyon West Airport	GA	29,597
Polacca	P10	PXL		Polacca Airport	GA	0
Safford	SAD	SAD	KSAD	**Safford Regional Airport**	GA	63
San Manuel	E77			San Manuel Airport	GA	0
Sedona	SEZ	SDX	KSEZ	Sedona Airport	GA	62
Sierra Vista / Ft Huachuca	FHU	FHU	KFHU	Sierra Vista Municipal Airport / Libby AAF	GA	178
Springerville	JTC		KJTC	Springerville Municipal Airport	GA	0
St. Johns	SJN	SJN	KSJN	St. Johns Industrial Air Park	GA	0
Taylor	TYL	TYZ	KTYL	Taylor Airport	GA	0
Tuba City	T03	TBC		Tuba City Airport	GA	0
Whiteriver	E24	WTR		Whiteriver Airport	GA	0
Wickenburg	E25	E25		Wickenburg Municipal Airport	GA	2
Willcox	P33	P33		Cochise County Airport	GA	0
Williams	CMR	CMR	KCMR	H.A. Clark Memorial Field	GA	0
Window Rock	RQE	RQE	KRQE	Window Rock Airport	GA	0
Winslow	INW	INW	KINW	Winslow–Lindbergh Regional Airport	GA	0
				**Other public-use airports** (not listed in NPIAS)		
Bullhead City	A20			Sun Valley Airport		
Chandler	P19	SLJ		Stellar Airpark		
Douglas	DGL	DGL	KDGL	Douglas Municipal Airport		
Douglas	P03			Cochise College Airport		
Kearny	E67			Kearny Airport		
Maricopa	E68			Estrella Sailport		
Meadview	L25	L25		Pearce Ferry Airport		0
Page	L41	L41		Marble Canyon Airport		50
Peach Springs	L37	L37		Grand Canyon Caverns Airport		0
Peoria	P48			Pleasant Valley Airport		
Pima	E37			Flying J Ranch Airport		
Seligman	P23			Seligman Airport		
Sells	E78			Sells Airport		
Somerton / San Luis	44A			Rolle Airfield (Rolle Field)		
Superior	E81			Superior Municipal Airport		
Temple Bar / Lake Mead	U30			Temple Bar Airport		
Tombstone	P29			Tombstone Municipal Airport		
Valle	40G	40G		Valle Airport		
Whitmore	1Z1	1Z1		Grand Canyon Bar 10 Airport		6,003
				**Other government/military airports**		
Gila Bend	GBN		KGBN	Gila Bend Air Force Auxiliary Field		
Glendale	LUF	LUF	KLUF	Luke Air Force Base		
Phoenix	P18			Papago Army Heliport		
Picacho	PCA		KPCA	Picacho Stagefield ARNG Heliport		
Tucson	DMA	DMA	KDMA	Davis–Monthan Air Force Base		567
Yuma	LGF	LGF	KLGF	Laguna Army Airfield (Yuma Proving Ground)		
Queen Creek	AZ38			Rittenhouse Army Heliport		
				**Notable private-use airports**		
Chandler	34AZ			Gila River Memorial Airport		
Marble Canyon	AZ03			Cliff Dwellers Airport		0
Mohave Valley	0AZ9			Eagle Airpark		
Peach Springs	3AZ5			Hualapai Airport		
Pima County	AZ67			El Tiro Gliderport		
Queen Creek	5AZ3			Pegasus Airpark		
Roosevelt Lake	88AZ			Grapevine Airstrip		
Tucson / Oro Valley	57AZ			La Cholla Airpark		
				**Notable former airports**		
Bowie	~~E54~~			Bowie Airport (closed)		
Casa Grande	~~E58~~			Three Point Airport (closed 1998–2000)		
Ganado	~~85V~~			Ganado Airport (closed)	~~GA~~	
Tuweep / Grand Canyon	~~L50~~			Tuweep Airport (closed)		
Wickenburg	~~44E~~			Forepaugh Airport (closed)		

== See also ==
- Arizona World War II Army Airfields
- Essential Air Service
- Wikipedia:WikiProject Aviation/Airline destination lists: North America#Arizona
