= AZC =

AZC or azc may refer to:

- American Zionist Council, a defunct Israeli lobby group formed in 1949
- AZC, the FAA LID code for Colorado City Municipal Airport, Arizona, United States
- azc, the ISO 639-5 code for Uto-Aztecan languages, in Western United States and Mexico
