= BGT =

BGT may stand for:

- Britain's Got Talent, a British TV programme
- Bagdad Airport, Arizona, U.S. IATA code
- Diehl BGT Defence, German missile producer
- Bonny Gas Transport, a shipping-company owned by Nigeria LNG
- Busch Gardens Tampa Bay, a theme park in Tampa, Florida
- Bughotu language, ISO 639-3 code bgt
