= P23 =

P23 may refer to:

== Aircraft ==
- Curtiss XP-23 Hawk II, an American experiment fighter
- Piaggio P.23, an Italian transport
- PZL P.23 Karaś, a Polish light bomber and reconnaissance aircraft

== Other uses ==
- LÉ Aisling (P23), a patrol vessel of the Irish Naval Service
- Makonde language
- Maltese patrol boat P23, of the Armed Forces of Malta
- Papyrus 23, a biblical manuscript
- PTGES3, an enzyme
- Seligman Airport, in Yavapai County, Arizona, United States
- P23 (space group), number 195
