= Casa Grande Municipal Airport =

Airport in Pinal County, Arizona

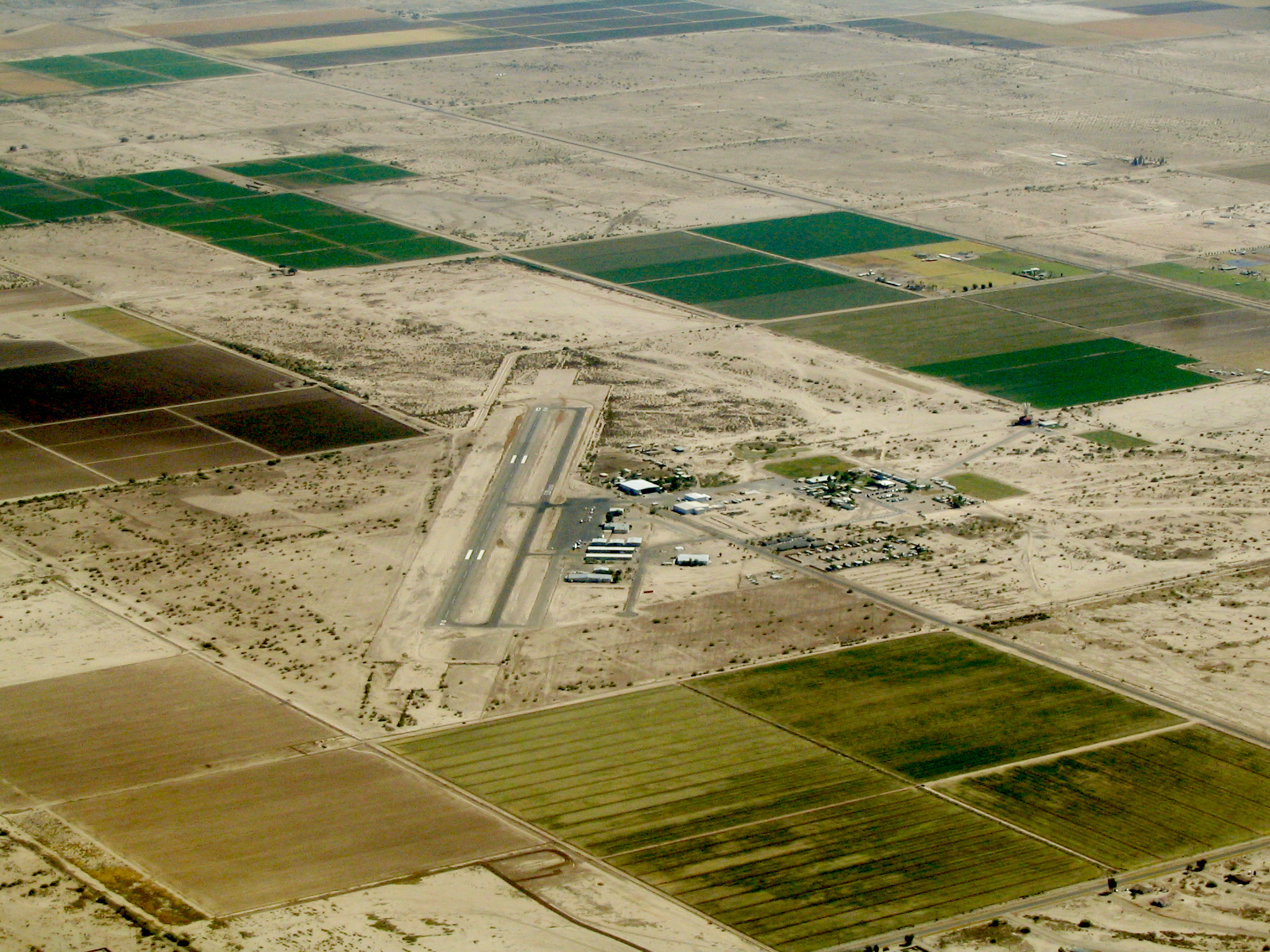
- IATA: CGZ; ICAO: KCGZ; FAA LID: CGZ

Summary
- Airport type: Public
- Owner: City of Casa Grande
- Serves: Casa Grande, Arizona
- Elevation AMSL: 1,464 ft (446 m)
- Coordinates: 32°57′18″N 111°46′01″W
- Website: CasaGrandeAZ.gov/...

Map
- Location within Arizona Location within the United States

Runways
Direction	Length		Surface
Direction	ft	m	Surface
5/23	5,200	1,585	Asphalt

Statistics (2023)
- Aircraft operations (year ending 4/17/2023): 122,000
- Based aircraft: 74
- Source: Federal Aviation Administration

Casa Grande Municipal Airport (IATA: CGZ, ICAO: KCGZ, FAA LID: CGZ) is a city-owned public-use airport 6 miles (5.2 nmi; 9.7 km) north of Casa Grande in Pinal County, Arizona. The FAA's National Plan of Integrated Airport Systems for 2009–2013 categorizes it as a general aviation facility. The airport is not served by an airline.

== Facilities ==
The airport covers 640 acres (260 ha) at an elevation of 1,464 feet (446 m). It has one runway: 5/23 measures 5,200 by 100 feet (1,585 x 30 m) and is made of asphalt

In the year ending April 17, 2023 the airport had an average of 334 aircraft operations per day: 98% general aviation, 2% air taxi, and <1% military.

74 aircraft were at the time based at this airport: 63 single-engine, 5 multi-engine, 5 helicopter, and 1 ultralight.

== Incidents ==
- A man died after walking into the spinning propeller of his Cessna 172SP, which was on a taxiway at Casa Grande, on January 18, 2005. The pilot was preparing to fly the aircraft to the Stellar Airpark as part of a ferry operation.
- On February 6, 2013, a twin engine Beechcraft King Air crashed at Casa Grande at 11:45 a.m. Two people were on board; both died. The post-crash investigation found no anomalies that would have prevented normal operation in either the airframe or the engine; investigations to the propeller also found that the engines were operating at the time of impact. The probable cause of the accident was found to be loss of control after the pilot excessively pitched up on a go-around attempt, resulting in a fatal stall/spin 300 feet above the ground.
- A man survived a small plane crash at Casa Grande Airport on November 27, 2018. He received minor facial injuries and was flown to Phoenix for medical treatment.

== See also ==
- List of airports in Arizona
