= P29 =

P29 may refer to:

== Aircraft ==
- Boeing P-29, an American prototype fighter aircraft
- Boulton Paul P.29 Sidestrand, a medium bomber of the Royal Air Force
- Percival P.29 Proctor, a British radio trainer and communications aircraft

== Vessels ==
- HMS Votary (P29), a cancelled submarine of the Royal Navy
- INS Kadmatt (P29), a corvette of the Indian Navy
- Maltese patrol boat P29, of the Armed Forces of Malta

== Other uses ==
- P29 Highway (Kazakhstan), part of the AH7 road
- Papyrus 29, a biblical manuscript
- Phosphorus-29, an isotope of phosphorus
- Tombstone Municipal Airport, in Cochise County, Arizona, United States
- P29, a Latvian state regional road
