= E68 =

E68 may refer to:

- European route E68, a road
- A Fianchetto variation of the King's Indian Defence, Encyclopaedia of Chess Openings code
- Chūō Expressway Kawaguchiko Route and Higashifuji-goko Road, route E68 in Japan
- Estrella Sailport, a privately owned public use airport in the U.S.A.
