= CWX =

CWX may refer to:

- CWX, the National Rail station code for Canary Wharf railway station, London, England
- CWX, the IATA code for Cochise County Airport, Arizona, United States
- Con-way Western Express, a division of Consolidated Freightways
- CanWel Building Materials Group, listed on the Toronto Stock Exchange as CWX
