= Hualapai (disambiguation) =

The Hualapai are a tribe of Native Americans that live in Arizona. Hualapai may also refer to:

- Havasupai–Hualapai language, the language of the Hualapai
- Hualapai Airport, an airport owned by the Hualapai in Coconino County, Arizona
- Hualapai Mountains, a mountain range in Mohave County, Arizona
- Hualapai Flat, a valley in Nevada
- Walapai, Arizona, an unincorporated community in Mohave County, also known as Hualapai
