= E63 =

E63 or E 63 may refer to:

== Airports ==
- The FAA identifier for Gila Bend Municipal Airport

== Transportation ==
=== Roads ===
- European route E63, a highway in Finland
- Hidaka Expressway, route E63 in Japan

=== Vehicles ===
- BMW E63, a 2003 platform number for the BMW 6 Series coupe (a luxury German automobile)
- Mercedes-AMG E 63 or E 63 S, a performance-oriented model designation for the Mercedes-Benz E-Class sedan (a luxury German automobile)

== Technology ==
=== Mobile Phones ===
- Nokia E63, a mobile phone manufactured by the Nokia Corporation
