= BSQ =

BSQ or bsq may refer to:

- BSQ, the IATA code for Bisbee Municipal Airport, Arizona, United States
- bsq, the ISO 639-3 code for Bassa language, Liberia, Ivory Coast, and Sierra Leone
