= 5V5 =

5V5 may refer to:

- 5V5 (voltage), a non-standard designation for 5.5 V following the RKM code notation per IEC 62/IEC 60062
- 5V5 (airport), a designation for the Shiprock Airstrip in the USA
