= Cliff Dwellers Airport =

Airport in Coconino County, Arizona, United States

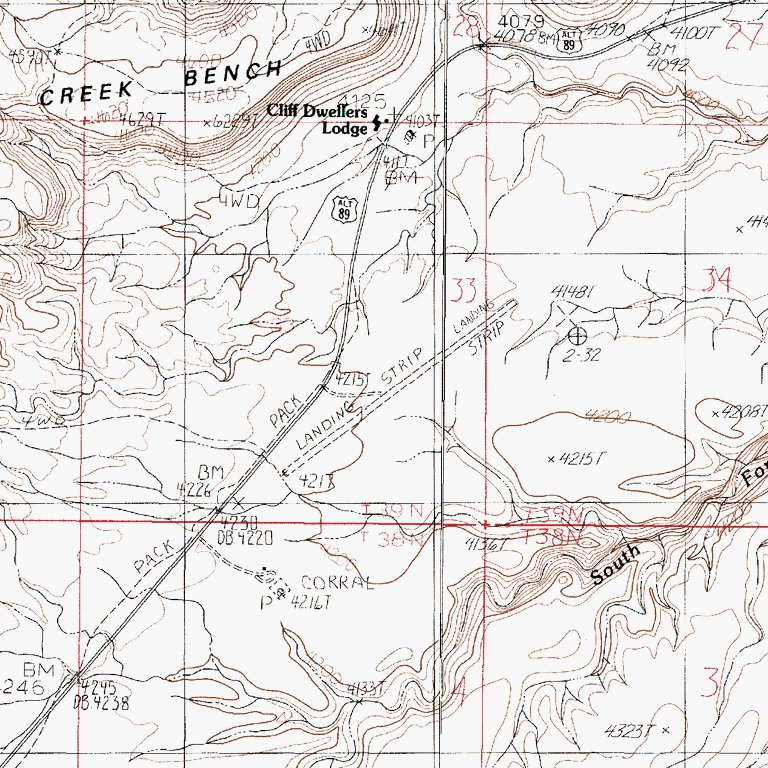
- IATA: none; ICAO: none; FAA LID: AZ03

Summary
- Airport type: Private
- Owner: Bureau of Land Management
- Serves: Marble Canyon
- Elevation AMSL: 4,217 ft / 1,285 m
- Coordinates: 36°44′03″N 111°45′10″W

Map

Runways
Direction	Length		Surface
Direction	ft	m	Surface
4/22	3,820	1,164	Dirt

Statistics (2015)
- Based aircraft: 3
- Source: Federal Aviation Administration

Cliff Dwellers Airport or Cliff Dwellers Lodge Airport (FAA LID: AZ03) is a private use non-towered airport owned by the Bureau of Land Management located 8 miles (7.0 nmi; 13 km) southwest of Marble Canyon Airport and the town of Marble Canyon, in Coconino County, Arizona, United States. This airport is 195 miles (169 nmi; 314 km) east of Las Vegas McCarran International Airport, the closest major airport with airline service.

Although most U.S. airports use the same three-letter location identifier for the FAA, IATA, and ICAO, this airport is only assigned AZ03 by the FAA.

== Facilities and aircraft ==
Cliff Dwellers Airport covers an area of 68 acres (28 ha) at an elevation of 4,217 ft (1,285 m) above mean sea level. It has one runway:

- 4/22 measuring 3,820 ft × 40 ft (1,164 m × 12 m) dirt

For the 12-month period ending April 23, 2015, the airport had three aircraft based at this airport: 100% single-engine.

== See also ==
- List of airports in Arizona
