= SLJ =

The initials SLJ or slj may refer to:

- School Library Journal, with articles and book reviews for library professionals
- Stellar Airpark, near Chandler, Arizona, IATA code
- Southern Literary Journal, of the US South
- Samuel L. Jackson, American actor
- Solomon Airport, IATA airport code "SLJ"
