= Tuba City Airport =

Airport in Coconino County, Arizona

Tuba City Airport Tó Naneesdizídi chidí naatʼaʼí ńdinibįįhígi (Navajo)
- IATA: TBC; ICAO: none; FAA LID: T03

Summary
- Airport type: Public
- Owner: Navajo Nation
- Serves: Tuba City, Arizona
- Elevation AMSL: 4,513 ft / 1,376 m
- Coordinates: 36°05′34″N 111°22′59″W

Map

Runways
Direction	Length		Surface
Direction	ft	m	Surface
15/33	6,230	1,899	Asphalt

Statistics (2010)
- Aircraft operations: 250
- Source: Federal Aviation Administration

Tuba City Airport (IATA: TBC, FAA LID: T03) is a public-use airport located 6 miles (5.2 nmi; 9.7 km) west of the central business district of Tuba City, in Coconino County, Arizona, United States. It is owned by the Navajo Nation.

This is one of six airports owned by the Navajo Nation; the other five being Chinle Airport (E91), Kayenta Airport (0V7) and Window Rock Airport (RQE) in Arizona, plus Crownpoint Airport (0E8) and Shiprock Airport (5V5) in New Mexico.

== Facilities and aircraft ==
Tuba City Airport covers an area of 350 acres (140 ha) at an elevation of 4,513 feet (1,376 m) above mean sea level. It has one runway designated 15/33 with an asphalt surface measuring 6,230 by 75 feet (1,899 x 23 m). For the 12-month period ending April 18, 2010, the airport had 250 general aviation aircraft operations, an average of 20 per month.

== See also ==
- List of airports in Arizona
