= Taylor Airport (Arizona) =

Airport in Navajo County, Arizona

- IATA: TYZ; ICAO: KTYL; FAA LID: TYL

Summary
- Airport type: Public
- Owner: Town of Taylor
- Location: Taylor, Arizona
- Elevation AMSL: 5,820 ft / 1,774 m
- Coordinates: 34°27′10″N 110°06′53″W

Map

Runways
Direction	Length		Surface
Direction	ft	m	Surface
3/21	7,000	2,134	Asphalt

Statistics (2006)
- Aircraft operations: 2,700
- Source: Federal Aviation Administration

Taylor Airport (IATA: TYZ, ICAO: KTYL, FAA LID: TYL), also known as Taylor Municipal Airport, is a public airport located 2 miles (1.7 nmi; 3.2 km) southwest of the central business district of Taylor, a city in Navajo County, Arizona, United States. The airport covers 102 acres (41 ha) and has one runway.

== See also ==
- List of airports in Arizona
