= Flying J Ranch Airport =

Airport in Graham County, Arizona

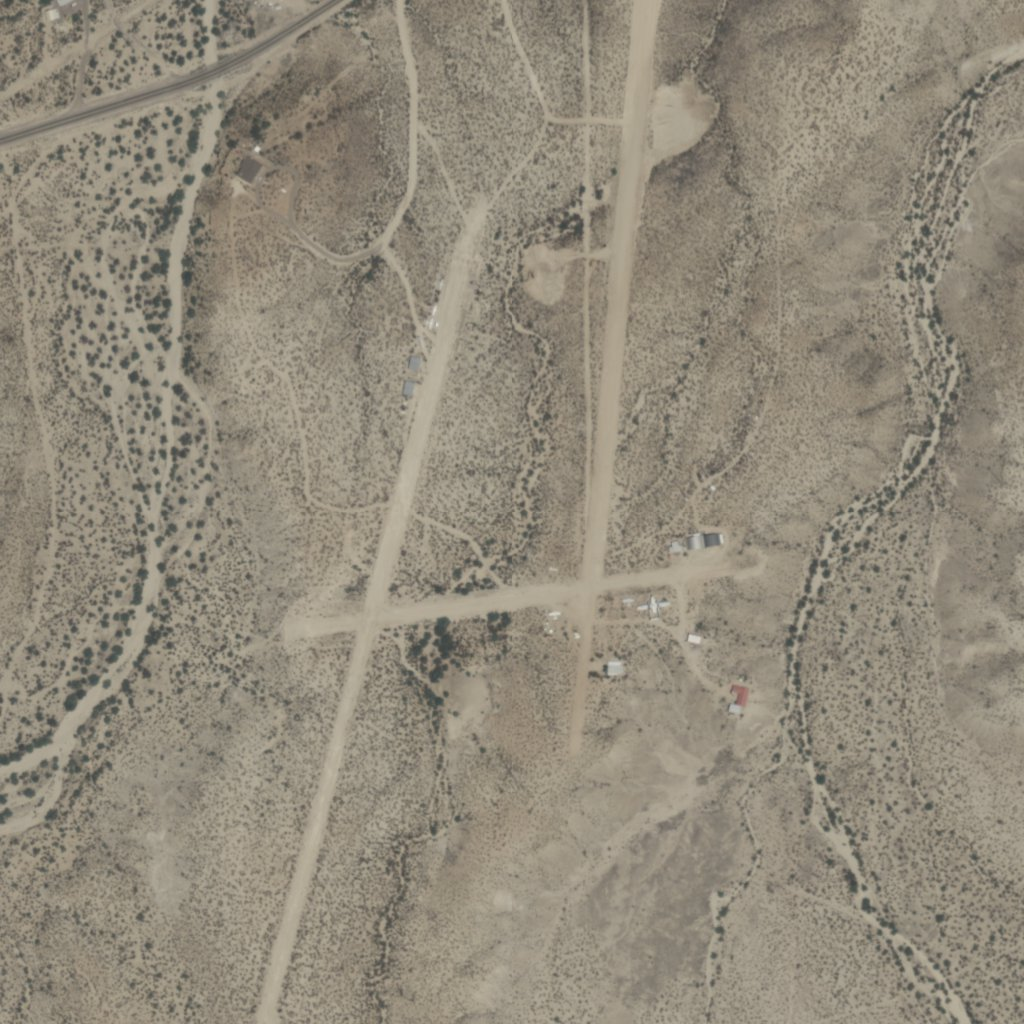
- IATA: none; ICAO: none; FAA LID: E37

Summary
- Airport type: Public
- Owner: Howard E. Jenkins
- Serves: Pima, Arizona
- Elevation AMSL: 3,114 ft / 949 m
- Coordinates: 32°50′52″N 109°52′54″W

Map

Runways
Direction	Length		Surface
Direction	ft	m	Surface
18/36	2,950	899	Dirt
7/25	1,650	503	Dirt

Statistics (2015)
- Aircraft operations: 200
- Based aircraft: 8
- Source: Federal Aviation Administration

Flying J Ranch Airport (FAA LID: E37) is a privately owned, public use non-towered airport owned by Howard E. Jenkins. The airport is located 4.6 miles (4.0 nmi; 7.4 km) southwest of the central business district of Pima, a city in Graham County, Arizona, United States and 79 miles (69 nmi; 127 km) northeast of Tucson International Airport.

Although most U.S. airports use the same three-letter location identifier for the FAA, IATA, and ICAO this airport is only assigned E37 by the FAA.

== Facilities and aircraft ==
Flying J Ranch Airport covers an area of 280 acres (110 ha) at an elevation of 3,114 ft (949 m) above mean sea level. According to the FAA the airport has two dirt runways:

- 18/36 measuring 2,950 ft × 45 ft (899 m × 14 m)
- 7/25 measuring 1,650 ft × 48 ft (503 m × 15 m)

The runways are described as being "extremely rough, rutted [with] large rocks scattered on surface".

For the 12-month period ending April 15, 2015, the airport had 200 aircraft operations, an average of 0.6 per day: 100% general aviation. At that time there were 8 aircraft based at this airport: 75% single-engine, no ultralight, 25% multi-engine, no jet, and no helicopters.

== See also ==
- List of airports in Arizona
