= Temple Bar Airport =

Airport in Mohave County, Arizona

- IATA: none; ICAO: none; FAA LID: U30

Summary
- Airport type: Public
- Owner: U.S. National Park Service
- Serves: Temple Bar, Arizona
- Location: Lake Mead National Recreation Area
- Elevation AMSL: 1,549 ft / 472 m
- Coordinates: 36°01′14″N 114°20′06″W

Map

Runways
Direction	Length		Surface
Direction	ft	m	Surface
18/36	3,500	1,067	Asphalt

Statistics (2022)
- Aircraft operations (year ending 5/17/2022): 950
- Source: Federal Aviation Administration

Temple Bar Airport (FAA LID: U30) is a public use airport in Mohave County, Arizona, United States. It is 1.15 miles (1.00 nmi; 1.85 km) southwest of the Temple Bar Marina, located on Lake Mead's Temple Basin. The airport is owned by the U.S. National Park Service.

== Facilities and aircraft ==
Temple Bar Airport covers an area of 75 acres (30 ha) at an elevation of 1,549 feet (472 m) above mean sea level. It has one runway with an asphalt surface:

- 18/36 measuring 3,500 by 50 feet (1,067 x 15 m).

For the 12-month period ending May 17, 2022, the airport had 950 aircraft operations, an average of 79 per month: 74% general aviation and 26% air taxi.

== See also ==
- List of airports in Arizona
