= Polacca Airport =

Airport in Navajo County, Arizona

- IATA: PXL; ICAO: none; FAA LID: P10

Summary
- Airport type: Public
- Owner: The Hopi Tribe
- Serves: Polacca, Arizona
- Elevation AMSL: 5,573 ft / 1,699 m
- Coordinates: 35°47′30″N 110°25′24″W

Map

Runways
Direction	Length		Surface
Direction	ft	m	Surface
4/22	4,200	1,280	Asphalt

Statistics (2010)
- Aircraft operations: 200
- Source: Federal Aviation Administration

Polacca Airport (IATA: PXL, FAA LID: P10) is a public use airport in Navajo County, Arizona, United States. The airport is owned by the Hopi Tribe. It is located 3.5 miles (3.0 nmi; 5.6 km) southwest of the central business district of Polacca, an unincorporated community on the Hopi Reservation.

This airport is included in the National Plan of Integrated Airport Systems for 2011–2015, which categorized it as a general aviation facility.

== Facilities and aircraft ==
Polacca Airport covers an area of 50 acres (20 ha) at an elevation of 5,573 feet (1,699 m) above mean sea level. It has one runway designated 4/22 with an asphalt surface measuring 4,200 by 50 feet (1,280 x 15 m).

For the 12-month period ending April 17, 2010, the airport had 200 general aviation aircraft operations, an average of 16 per month. Anyone can utilize the airport for business or personal purposes. Today, most customers are from the U.S. Health and Human Services' Indian Health Service.

Charles Loloma, a famous Hopi artist, often parked his private plane at the airport.

== See also ==
- List of airports in Arizona
