= Grand Canyon Bar 10 Airport =

Airport in Mohave County, Arizona

- IATA: GCT; ICAO: none; FAA LID: 1Z1

Summary
- Airport type: Public
- Owner/Operator: Grand Canyon Bar Ten Ranch
- Location: Whitmore, Arizona
- Elevation AMSL: 4,100 ft (1,200 m)
- Coordinates: 36.2580°N 113.2311°W
- Website: http://www.bar10.com/lodge.amp#5

Map
- Location within Arizona Location within the United States

Runways
Direction	Length		Surface
Direction	ft	m	Surface
16/34	4,600	1,402	Asphalt/dirt
- Source: Federal Aviation Administration

Grand Canyon Bar 10 Airport (IATA: GCT, FAA LID: 1Z1) is a public-use airport located 69 miles (60 nmi; 111 km) south-east of the CBD of Whitmore, in Mohave County, Arizona, United States, near the Grand Canyon.

== Facilities and aircraft ==
Grand Canyon Bar 10 Airport covers an area of 100 acres (40 ha) at an elevation of 4,100 feet (1,200 m) above mean sea level. It has one runway:

- 16/34 measuring 4,600 x 40 feet (1,402 x 12 m) with an asphalt/dirt surface

For the 12-month period ending May 18, 2022, the airport had 3,500 general aviation aircraft operations, an average of 67 per week. At that time there were no aircraft based at this airport.

== See also ==
- List of airports in Arizona
