= Window Rock Airport =

Airport in Apache County, Arizona

Window Rock Airport Tségháhoodzáníidi chidí naatʼaʼí ńdinibįįhígi (Navajo)
- IATA: none; ICAO: KRQE; FAA LID: RQE

Summary
- Airport type: Public
- Owner: Navajo Nation
- Serves: Window Rock, Arizona
- Elevation AMSL: 6,742 ft / 2,055 m
- Coordinates: 35°39′07″N 109°04′03″W

Map

Runways
Direction	Length		Surface
Direction	ft	m	Surface
3/21	7,000	2,134	Asphalt

Statistics (2022)
- Aircraft operations (year ending 5/6/2022): 750
- Source: Federal Aviation Administration

Window Rock Airport (ICAO: KRQE, FAA LID: RQE, formerly P34) is a public use airport located 1.15 miles (1.00 nmi; 1.85 km) south of the central business district of Window Rock, in Apache County, Arizona, United States. It is owned by the Navajo Nation.

This is one of six airports owned by the Navajo Nation; the other five being Chinle Airport (E91), Kayenta Airport (0V7) and Tuba City Airport (T03) in Arizona, plus Crownpoint Airport (0E8) and Shiprock Airport (5V5) in New Mexico.

Although most U.S. airports use the same three-letter location identifier for the FAA and IATA, this airport is assigned RQE by the FAA, but has no designation from the IATA. Prior to December 1998, its FAA identifier was P34.

== Facilities and aircraft ==
Window Rock Airport covers an area of 88 acres (36 ha) at an elevation of 6,742 feet (2,055 m) above mean sea level. It has one runway designated 3/21 with an asphalt surface measuring 7,000 by 75 feet (2,134 x 23 m). For the 12-month period ending May 6, 2022, the airport had 750 general aviation aircraft operations, an average of 62 per month.

== See also ==
- List of airports in Arizona
