= Eric González =

Canary Islands baseball player (born 1986)

- Pitcher
- Born: September 5, 1986 (age 39); San Juan de la Rambla, Canary Islands
- Bats: Right Throws: Right
- Stats at Baseball Reference

Eric Gonzalez-Diaz (born September 5, 1986) is a Canary Islands former professional baseball pitcher.

== Career ==
Gonzalez was drafted by the San Diego Padres in the 24th round of the 2008 Major League Baseball draft out of the University of South Alabama. He had previously attended Cochise Community College in Douglas, Arizona. After playing in the Padres system through 2010 he was released and signed with the Lake Erie Crushers of the Frontier League, an independent league. He remained with independent teams for the remainder of his professional career, last playing for the Camden Riversharks of the Atlantic League and the Kansas City T-Bones of the American Association in 2013.

He played for the Spain national baseball team in the 2013 World Baseball Classic.
