= St. Johns Industrial Air Park =

Airport in Apache County, Arizona

- IATA: SJN; ICAO: KSJN; FAA LID: SJN

Summary
- Airport type: Public
- Owner: City of St. Johns
- Serves: St. Johns, Arizona
- Elevation AMSL: 5,737 ft (1,749 m)
- Coordinates: 34°31′07″N 109°22′44″W

Map
- Location within Arizona Location within the United States

Runways
Direction	Length		Surface
Direction	ft	m	Surface
3/21	3,400	1,036	Asphalt
14/32	5,322	1,622	Asphalt

Statistics (2010)
- Aircraft operations: 15,800
- Based aircraft: 6
- Source: Federal Aviation Administration

St. Johns Industrial Air Park (IATA: SJN, ICAO: KSJN, FAA LID: SJN) is a city-owned public-use airport located 1.15 miles (1.00 nmi; 1.85 km) north of the central business district of St. Johns, a city in Apache County, Arizona, United States. The airport is included in the FAA's National Plan of Integrated Airport Systems for 2009–2013, which categorizes it as a general aviation facility. The NPIAS report for 2015–2019 classified the Air Park again as General Aviation, in the "Basic" asset category, for airports with the lowest levels of activity.

== Facilities and aircraft ==
St. Johns Industrial Air Park covers an area of 112 acres (45 ha) at an elevation of 5,737 feet (1,749 m) above mean sea level. It has two asphalt paved runways:

- 14/32 is 5,322 by 75 feet (1,622 x 23 m).
- 3/21 is 3,400 by 60 feet (1,036 x 18 m).

For the 12-month period ending April 28, 2010, the airport had 15,800 aircraft operations, an average of 43 per day: 98% general aviation and 2% military. At that time there were six aircraft based at this airport, all single-engine. The data for the 2015 report indicated that five aircraft were based there in 2014, and projected $1,547,844 in planned development of the airport for the five-year period ending in 2019.

== See also ==
- List of airports in Arizona
