= Pearce Ferry Airport =

Airport in Mohave County, Arizona

- IATA: none; ICAO: none; FAA LID: L25

Summary
- Airport type: Public
- Owner: U.S. National Park Service
- Serves: Meadview, Arizona
- Location: Lake Mead National Recreation Area
- Elevation AMSL: 2,941 ft / 896 m
- Coordinates: 36°05′36″N 114°02′48″W

Map

Runways
Direction	Length		Surface
Direction	ft	m	Surface
1/19	2,900	884	Dirt

Statistics (2010)
- Aircraft operations: 300
- Source: Federal Aviation Administration

Pearce Ferry Airport (FAA LID: L25) is a public use airport in Mohave County, Arizona, United States. The airport is owned by the National Park Service. It is located 3.5 miles (3.0 nmi; 5.6 km) north of the central business district of Meadview and 2.9 miles (2.5 nmi; 4.7 km) east of Lake Mead's Gregg Basin.

== Facilities and aircraft ==
Pearce Ferry Airport covers an area of 8 acres (3.2 ha) at an elevation of 2,941 feet (896 m) above mean sea level. It has one runway designated 1/19 with a dirt surface measuring 2,900 by 110 feet (884 x 34 m).

For the 12-month period ending April 20, 2010, the airport had 300 aircraft operations, an average of 25 per month: 67% air taxi and 33% general aviation.

== See also ==
- List of airports in Arizona
