= Chinle Municipal Airport =

Airport in Apache County, Arizona

Chinle Municipal Airport Chʼíńlį́įdi chidí naatʼaʼí ńdinibįįhígi (Navajo)
- IATA: none; ICAO: none; FAA LID: E91

Summary
- Airport type: Public
- Owner: Navajo Nation
- Serves: Chinle, Arizona
- Elevation AMSL: 5,550 ft (1,690 m)
- Coordinates: 36°06′34″N 109°34′32″W

Map
- Location within Arizona Location within the United States

Runways
| Direction | Length | | Surface |
| Direction | ft | m | Surface |
|---|---|---|---|
| 18/36 | 6,900 | 2,103 | Asphalt |

Statistics (2010)
- Aircraft operations: 7,800
- Source: Federal Aviation Administration

Chinle Municipal Airport (FAA LID: E91), also referred to as Chinle Airport, is a public-use airport located 4 miles (3.5 nmi; 6.4 km) southwest of the central business district of Chinle, in Apache County, Arizona, United States. It is owned by the Navajo Nation.

As per Federal Aviation Administration records, the airport had 131 passenger boardings (enplanements) in calendar year 2005 and 2,059 enplanements (all unscheduled) in 2006. According to the FAA's National Plan of Integrated Airport Systems for 2007–2011, Chinle is a general aviation airport (the commercial service category requires at least 2,500 passenger boardings per year).

This is one of six airports owned by the Navajo Nation; the other five being Kayenta Airport (0V7), Tuba City Airport (T03) and Window Rock Airport (RQE) in Arizona, plus Crownpoint Airport (0E8) and Shiprock Airport (5V5) in New Mexico.

== Facilities and aircraft ==
Chinle Municipal Airport covers an area of 357 acres (144 ha) at an elevation of 5,550 feet (1,692 m) above mean sea level. It has one runway designated 18/36 with an asphalt surface measuring 6,900 by 60 feet (2,103 x 18 m). For the 12-month period ending April 17, 2010, the airport had 7,800 aircraft operations, an average of 21 per day: 74% air taxi and 26% general aviation.

== Accidents & incidents ==
- On Aug 5, 2025, a Beechcraft King Air 300 operating for CSI Aviation crashed while attempting to land at the Chinle Municipal Airport, killing all four people on board. The accident is under investigation.

== See also ==
- List of airports in Arizona
