= Sells Airport =

Airport near Sells, Arizona

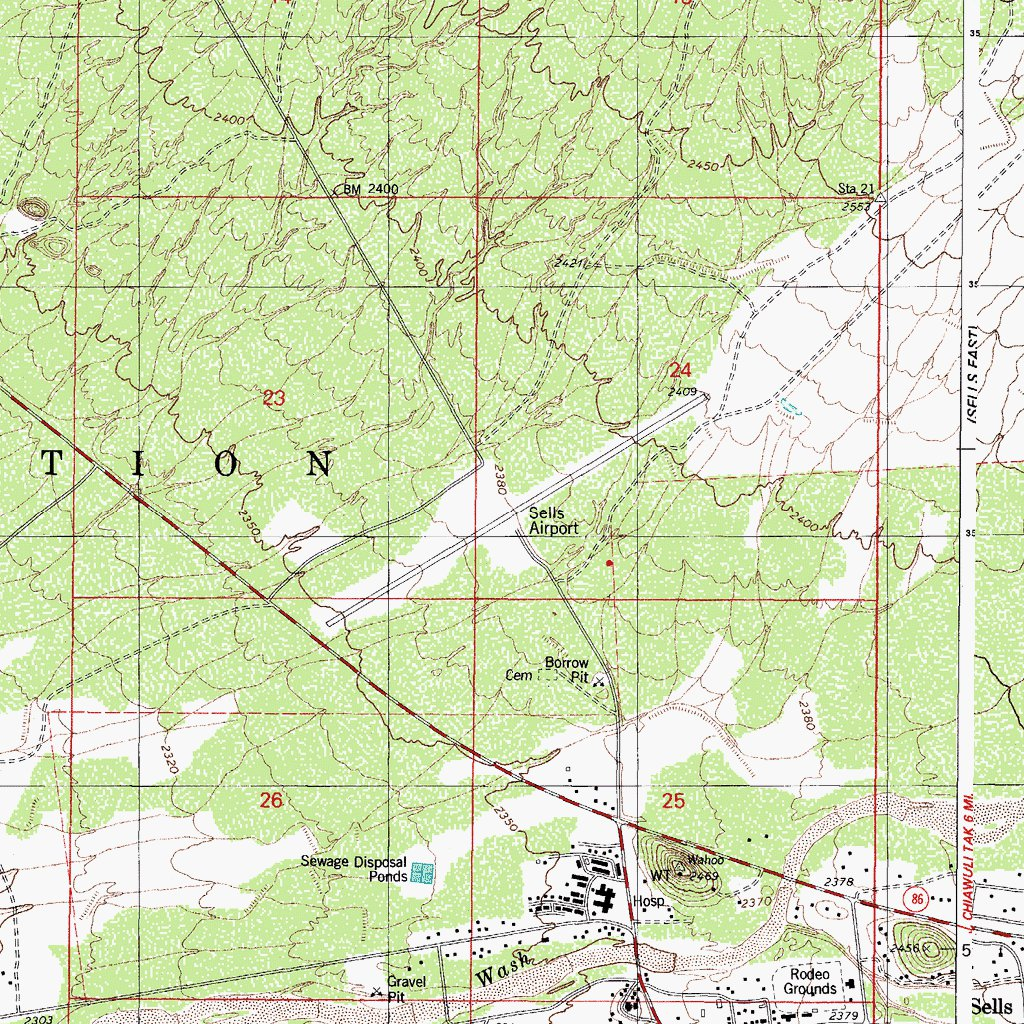
- IATA: none; ICAO: none; FAA LID: E78

Summary
- Airport type: Public
- Owner/Operator: Tohono O'odham Nation
- Serves: Sells, Arizona
- Elevation AMSL: 2,409 ft / 734 m
- Coordinates: 31°55′57″N 111°53′39″W

Map

Runways
Direction	Length		Surface
Direction	ft	m	Surface
4/22	5,830	1,777	Asphalt

Statistics (2017)
- Aircraft operations: 260
- Based aircraft: none
- Source: Federal Aviation Administration

Sells Airport (FAA LID: E78) is a public use non-towered airport owned by the Tohono O'odham Nation. The airport is located 4.3 miles (3.7 nmi; 6.9 km) northwest of the central business district of Sells, a city in Pima, Arizona, United States. It is 58 miles (50 nmi; 93 km) west of Tucson International Airport.

Although most U.S. airports use the same three-letter location identifier for the FAA, IATA, and ICAO, this airport is only assigned E78 by the FAA.

== Facilities and aircraft ==
San Manuel Airport covers an area of 20 acres (8.1 ha) at an elevation of 2,409 ft (734 m) above mean sea level. It has one asphalt runway:

- 4/22 measuring 5,830 ft × 60 ft (1,777 m × 18 m)

For the 12-month period ending April 17, 2017, the airport had 260 aircraft operations, an average of 0.7 per day: 77% general aviation and 23% air taxi. At that time there were no aircraft based at this airport.

== See also ==
- List of airports in Arizona
