= Crownpoint Airport =

Airport in New Mexico, United States

Crownpoint Airport Tʼiistsʼózídi chidí naatʼaʼí ńdinibįįhígi (Navajo)
- IATA: none; ICAO: none; FAA LID: 0E8

Summary
- Airport type: Public
- Owner: Navajo Nation
- Serves: Crownpoint, New Mexico
- Elevation AMSL: 6,696 ft (2,041 m)
- Coordinates: 35°43′04″N 108°12′06″W
- Interactive map of Crownpoint Airport

Runways
Direction	Length		Surface
Direction	ft	m	Surface
18/36	5,820	1,774	Asphalt

Statistics (2021)
- Aircraft operations (year ending 4/6/2021): 500
- Source: Federal Aviation Administration

Crownpoint Airport (FAA LID: 0E8) is a public-use airport located three nautical miles (4 mi, 6 km) northwest of the central business district of Crownpoint, in McKinley County, New Mexico, United States.

This is one of six airports owned by the Navajo Nation; the others being Shiprock Airport (5V5) in New Mexico, plus Chinle Airport (E91), Kayenta Airport (0V7), Tuba City Airport (T03) and Window Rock Airport (RQE) in Arizona.

== Facilities and aircraft ==
Crownpoint Airport covers an area of 22 acres (9 ha) at an elevation of 6,696 feet (2,041 m) above mean sea level. It has one runway designated 18/36 with an asphalt surface measuring 5,820 by 60 feet (1,774 x 18 m).

For the 12-month period ending April 6, 2021, the airport had 500 aircraft operations, an average of 42 per month: 60% air taxi and 40% general aviation.
