= Cochise College Airport =

Airport in Cochise County, Arizona

- IATA: none; ICAO: none; FAA LID: P03

Summary
- Airport type: Public
- Owner/Operator: Cochise College
- Serves: Douglas, Arizona
- Elevation AMSL: 4,124 ft (1,257 m)
- Coordinates: 31.3711°N 109.6904°W

Map
- Location within Arizona Location within the United States

Runways
Direction	Length		Surface
Direction	ft	m	Surface
5/23	5,303	1,616	Asphalt
- Source: Federal Aviation Administration

Cochise College Airport (FAA LID: P03) is a public use airport located 7 miles (6.1 nmi; 11 km) west of the Central business district of Douglas, in Cochise County, Arizona, United States. Cochise College Airport is used by Cochise College's aviation program.

== Facilities and aircraft ==
Cochise College Airport covers an area of 500 acres (200 ha) at an elevation of 4,124 feet (1,257 m) above mean sea level. It has one runway:

- 5/23 is 5,303 by 72 feet (1,616 x 22 m) with an asphalt surface.

For the 12-month period ending April 16, 2008, the airport had 47,000 general aviation aircraft operations, an average of 129 per day. At that time there were 15 aircraft based at this airport: 14 single-engine and 1 multi-engine.

== See also ==
- List of airports in Arizona
