= Kayenta Airport =

Airport in Navajo County, Arizona, US

Kayenta Airport Tó Dínéeshzheeʼdi chidí naatʼaʼí ńdinibįįhígi (Navajo)
- IATA: MVM; ICAO: none; FAA LID: 0V7

Summary
- Airport type: Public use
- Owner: Kayenta Township
- Serves: Kayenta, Arizona
- Elevation AMSL: 5,688 ft (1,734 m)
- Coordinates: 36°42′59″N 110°13′42″W

Map
- Location within Arizona Location within the United States

Runways
Direction	Length		Surface
Direction	ft	m	Surface
5/23	7,101	2,164	Asphalt

Statistics (2010)
- Aircraft operations: 2,000
- Source: Federal Aviation Administration

Kayenta Airport (IATA: MVM, FAA LID: 0V7) is a public use airport located 2.3 miles (2.0 nmi; 3.7 km) southeast of the central business district of Kayenta, in Navajo County, Arizona, United States. It is owned by Kayenta Township, which is part of the Navajo Nation.

This airport is included in the National Plan of Integrated Airport Systems, which categorized it as a general aviation facility. It is one of six airports owned by the Navajo Nation; the other five being Chinle Airport (E91), Tuba City Airport (T03) and Window Rock Airport (RQE) in Arizona, plus Crownpoint Airport (0E8) and Shiprock Airport (5V5) in New Mexico.

== Facilities and aircraft ==
Kayenta Airport covers an area of 140 acres (57 ha) at an elevation of 5,688 feet (1,734 m) above mean sea level. It has one runway designated 5/23 with an asphalt surface measuring 7,101 by 75 feet (2,164 x 23 m). For the 12-month period ending April 17, 2010, the airport had 2,000 aircraft operations, an average of 166 per month: 75% general aviation and 25% air taxi.

== See also ==
- List of airports in Arizona
