= Douglas Municipal Airport (Arizona) =

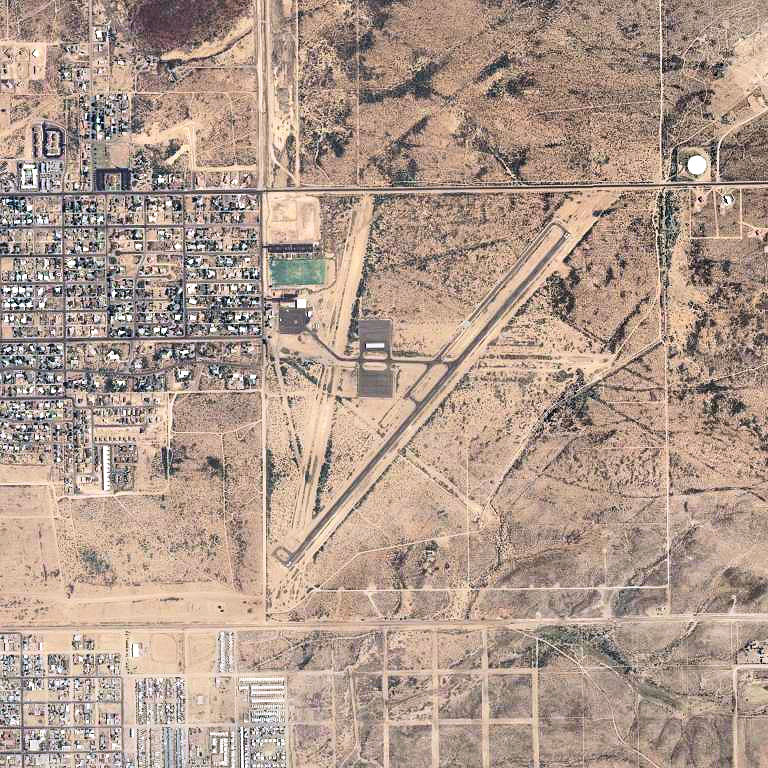
- 2006 USGS photo
- IATA: DGL; ICAO: KDGL; FAA LID: DGL

Summary
- Airport type: Public
- Owner: City of Douglas
- Serves: Douglas, Arizona
- Elevation AMSL: 4,173 ft (1,272 m)
- Coordinates: 31°20′33″N 109°30′23″W

Map
- Location of Douglas Municipal Airport

Runways
Direction	Length		Surface
Direction	ft	m	Surface
3/21	5,760	1,756	Asphalt
18/36	4,095	1,248	Dirt

Statistics (2005)
- Aircraft operations: 7,500
- Source: Federal Aviation Administration

- Douglas Municipal Airport
- U.S. National Register of Historic Places
- U.S. Historic district
- Location within Arizona Location within the United States
- Location: E end of 10th Ave., Douglas, Arizona
- Area: 221.8 acres (89.8 ha)
- Built: 1928
- NRHP reference No.: 75000336
- Added to NRHP: December 30, 1975

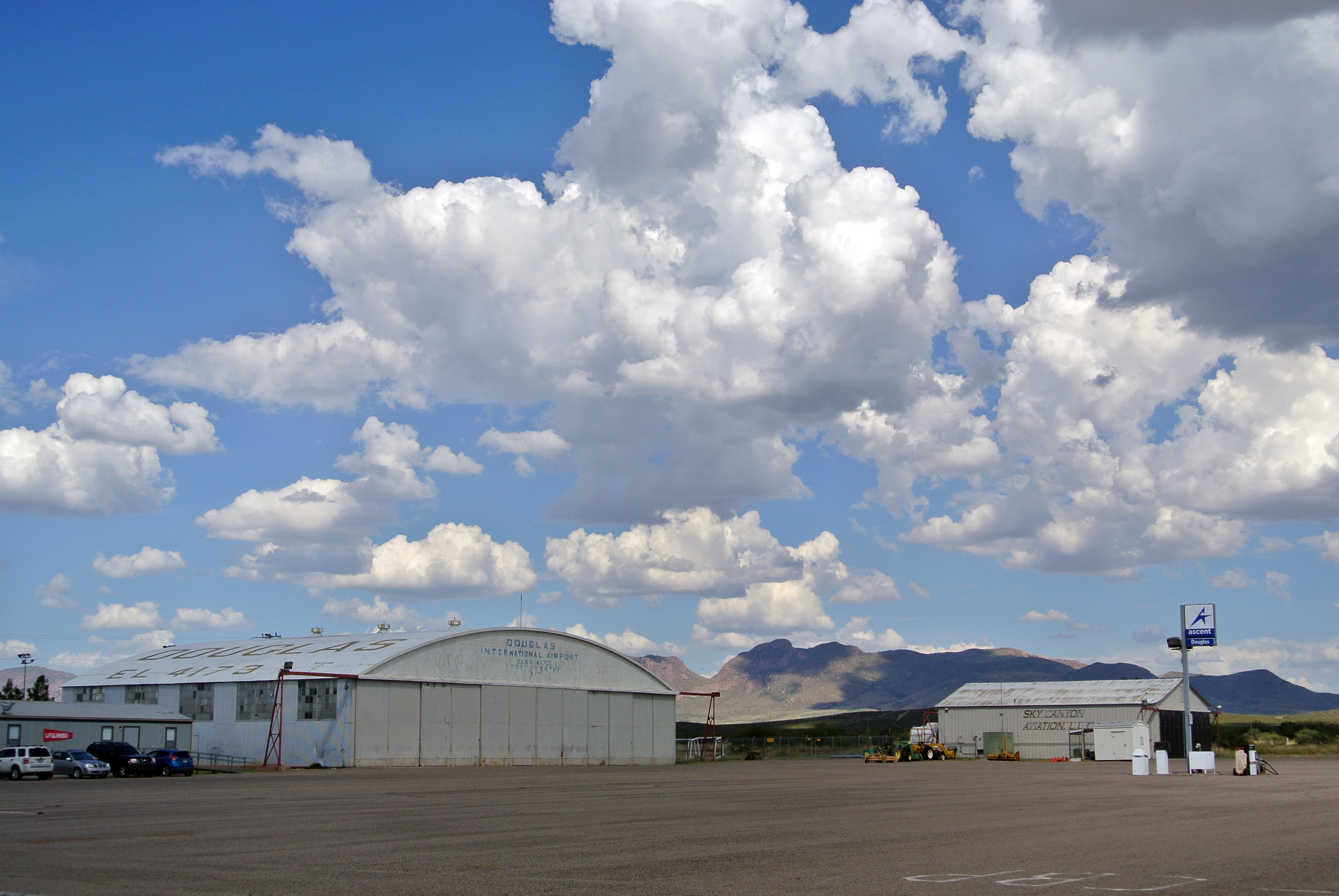

Douglas Municipal Airport (IATA: DGL, ICAO: KDGL, FAA LID: DGL) is a public airport located 2 miles (1.7 nmi; 3.2 km) east of the central business district of Douglas, a city in Cochise County, Arizona, United States. The airport is owned by the city of Douglas. It is not served by any commercial airlines at this time [when?]. The end of runway 21 is 800 feet (240 m) north of the Mexico–United States border.

== Facilities and aircraft ==
Douglas Municipal Airport covers an area of 640 acres (260 ha) which contains two runways:

- 3/21 has an asphalt pavement measuring 5,760 x 75 ft (1,756 x 23 m).
- 18/36 has a dirt surface measuring 4,095 x 100 ft (1,248 x 30 m).

For the 12-month period ending July 31, 2005, the airport had 7,500 general aviation aircraft operations, an average of 20 per day.

== See also ==
- Bisbee-Douglas International Airport
- List of airports in Arizona
