= Seligman Airport =

Public use airport in Yavapai County, Arizona

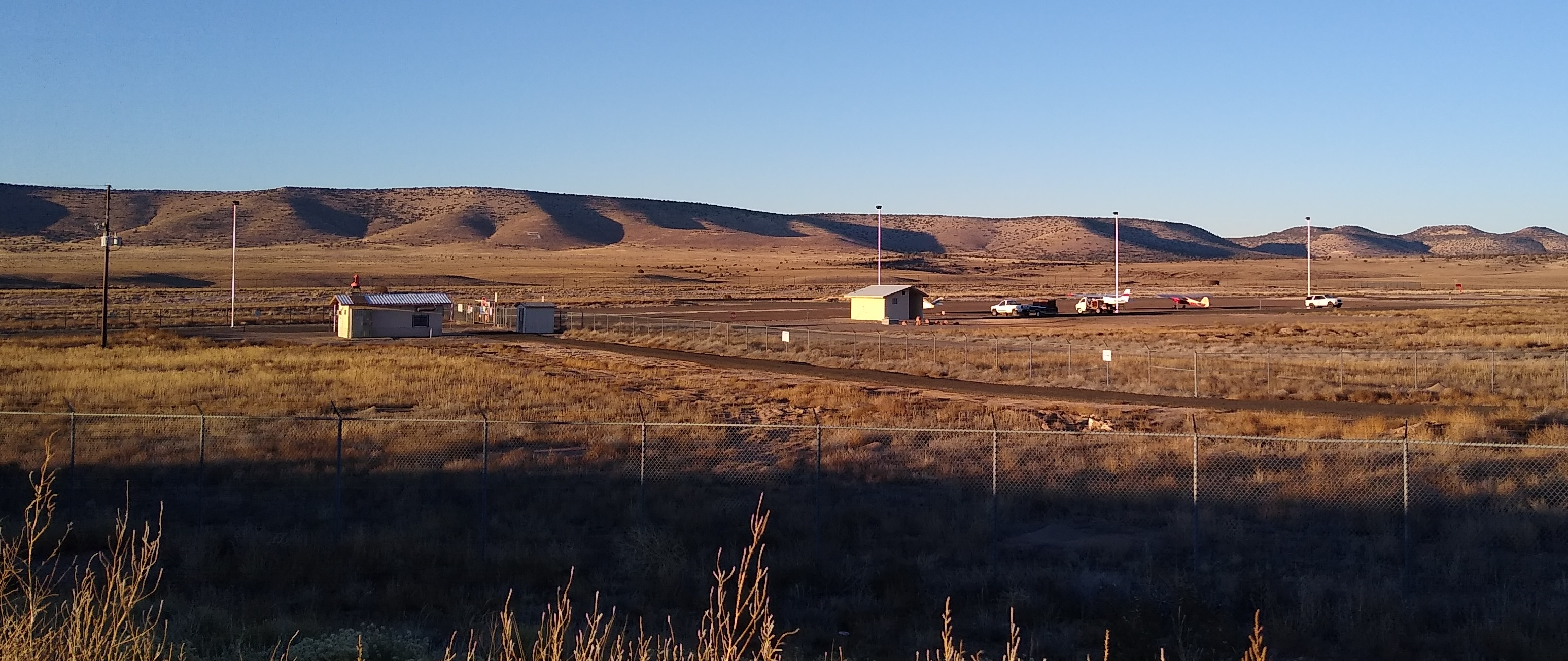
- IATA: none; ICAO: none; FAA LID: P23

Summary
- Airport type: Public
- Owner: Yavapai County
- Serves: Seligman, Arizona
- Elevation AMSL: 5,237 ft / 1,596 m
- Coordinates: 35°20′06″N 112°53′11″W

Map
- Location of airport in Arizona P23 (the United States)

Runways
Direction	Length		Surface
Direction	ft	m	Surface
04/22	4,800	1,463	Asphalt

Statistics (2016)
- Aircraft operations: 1,100
- Based aircraft (2017): 2
- Source: Federal Aviation Administration

Seligman Airport (FAA LID: P23) is a public use airport located 1.15 miles (1.00 nmi; 1.85 km) northwest of the central business district of Seligman, Arizona, United States, a census designated place located in Yavapai County. The airport has been owned by Yavapai County since 1985, and was leased by the county prior to then.

== Facilities and aircraft ==
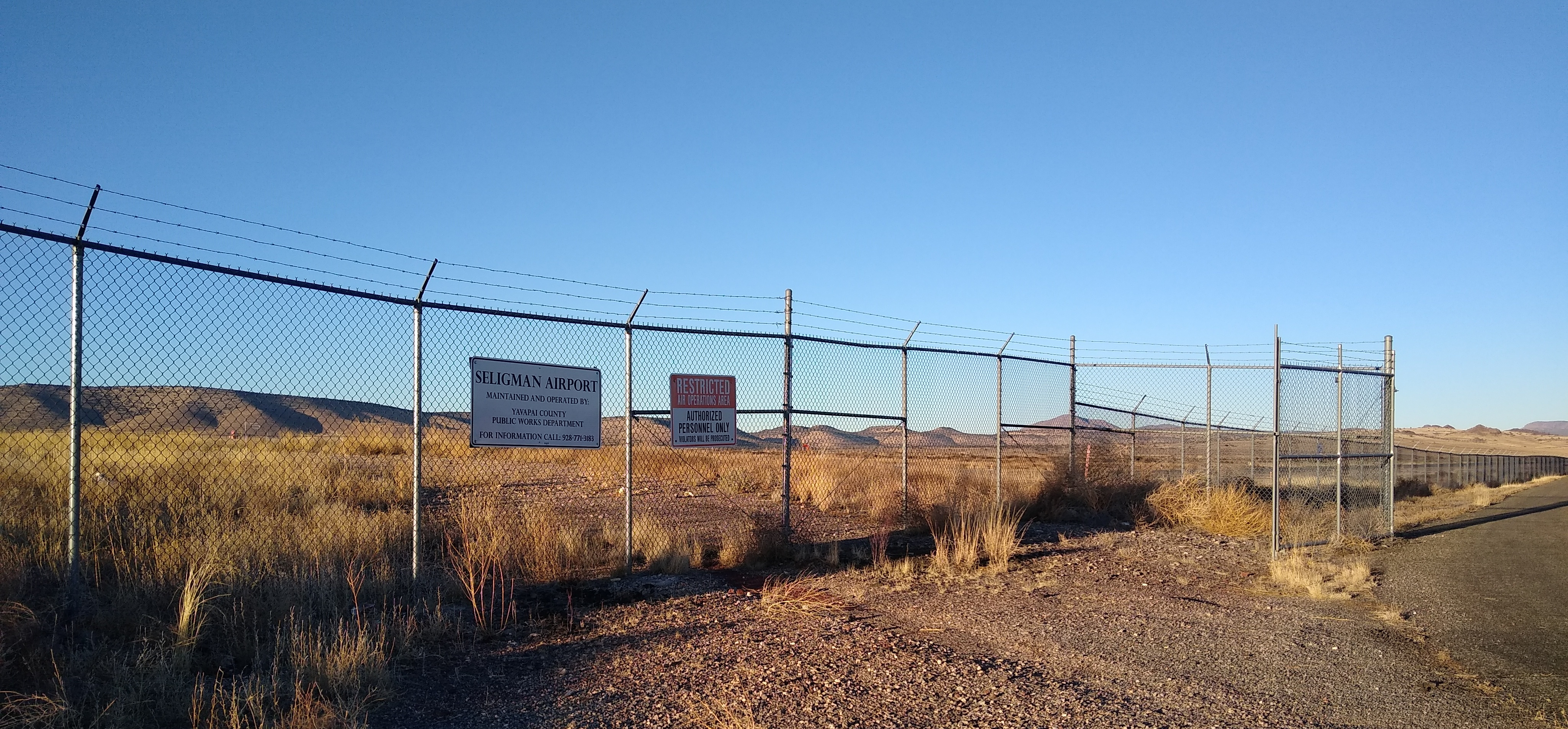
Entrance to Seligman Airport

Seligman Airport covers an area of 140 acres (57 ha) at an elevation of 5,237 feet (1,596 m) above mean sea level. It has one runway designated 04/22 with an asphalt surface measuring 4,800 by 75 feet (1463 x 22 m).

For the 12-month period ending April 14, 2016, the airport had 1,300 aircraft operations: 100% general aviation. In December 2017, there were two aircraft based at the airport.

== See also ==
- List of airports in Arizona
