= Marble Canyon Airport =

Airport in Coconino County, Arizona

- IATA: MYH; ICAO: none; FAA LID: L41

Summary
- Airport type: Private
- Owner/Operator: Jane Foster
- Serves: Marble Canyon, Arizona
- Elevation AMSL: 3,603 ft / 1,098 m
- Coordinates: 36.8113°N 111.6439°W

Map

Runways
Direction	Length		Surface
Direction	ft	m	Surface
3/21	3,715	1,132	Asphalt
- Source: Federal Aviation Administration

Marble Canyon Airport (IATA: MYH, FAA LID: L41) is a privately owned, public-use airport located 1.15 miles (1.00 nmi; 1.85 km) south west of the Central business district of Marble Canyon, in Coconino County, Arizona, United States.

== Facilities and aircraft ==
Marble Canyon Airport covers an area of 80 acres (32 ha) at an elevation of 3,603 feet (1,098 m) above mean sea level. It has one runway: 3/21 is 3,715 by 35 feet (1,132 x 11 m) with an asphalt surface.

For the 12-month period ending April 18, 2010, the airport had 2,100 general aviation aircraft operations, an average of 6 per day. At that time there was 1 aircraft based at this airport, a single-engine.

The airport is currently closed for public use.

== See also ==
- List of airports in Arizona
