= American Zionist Council =

Pro-Israeli lobby group in the USA

The American Zionist Council (AZC) was a pro-Israeli lobby group in the United States founded in 1949. It represented nine nationwide Zionist organizations in matters related specifically to Zionism, following the establishment of Israel. It was founded as a tax-exempt umbrella organization of American Jewish groups, which focused on Israel and included the Zionist Organization of America (ZOA), Hadassah, and other Zionist organizations active in the United States. It acted as an umbrella group for public relations, outreach, and lobbying on Capitol Hill. Between 1951 and 1953, its Washington representative was Isaiah L. Kenen.

Kenen organized the unincorporated American Zionist Committee for Public Affairs (AZCPA) in 1951. AZCPA was primarily a "public relations" organization, emitting numerous news releases. In 1954, AZC divested itself of AZCPA "because its leaders did not want to use tax-exempt funds for lobbying." AZC sent monthly newsletters entitled Near East Report and Israel Digest to every member of Congress. These newsletters were found to be funded in an indirect, circuitous manner by the Israeli government. In the 1950s, the Eisenhower administration insisted on the AZC registering as a foreign agent. In November 1962, the United States Department of Justice (at the time headed by Attorney General Robert F. Kennedy), demanded that the AZC register as a foreign agent, although this demand was later withdrawn. Following its independence, AZCPA began involving American Jewish organizations not formally committed to Zionism in order to increase its credibility and separate itself from AZC's role as a middleman for the Israeli government. These efforts met with success, with AZCPA able to organize multiple meetings between Jewish leaders and the Eisenhower administration during the Suez Crisis, although they did not substantially change Eisenhower's approach to the crisis. AZCPA was renamed to the American Israel Public Affairs Committee (AIPAC) in 1959, reflecting its position that a commitment to defending Israel now extended beyond American Zionist organizations to all Jewish organizations.
