= Cochise County Airport =

Airport in Cochise County, Arizona

- IATA: CWX; ICAO: none; FAA LID: P33

Summary
- Airport type: Public
- Owner: Cochise County
- Serves: Willcox, Arizona
- Elevation AMSL: 4,187 ft (1,276 m)
- Coordinates: 32°14′44″N 109°53′41″W

Map
- Location within Arizona

Runways
Direction	Length		Surface
Direction	ft	m	Surface
3/21	6,095	1,858	Asphalt

Statistics (2023)
- Aircraft operations: 50,500
- Based aircraft: 17
- Source: Federal Aviation Administration

Cochise County Airport (IATA: CWX, FAA LID: P33) is a county-owned public-use airport in Cochise County, Arizona, United States. It is located 3.5 miles (3.0 nmi; 5.6 km) west of the central business district of Willcox, Arizona. This airport is included in the FAA's National Plan of Integrated Airport Systems for 2009–2013, which categorized it as a general aviation facility.

== Facilities and aircraft ==
Cochise County Airport covers an area of 960 acres (390 ha) at an elevation of 4,187 feet (1,276 m) above mean sea level. It has one runway designated 3/21 with an asphalt surface measuring 6,095 by 75 feet (1,858 x 23 m).

For the 12-month period ending April 10, 2023, the airport had 50,500 aircraft operations, an average of 138 per day: 98% general aviation and 2% military. At that time there were 17 aircraft based at this airport: all single-engine.

== See also ==
- List of airports in Arizona
