= Bagdad Airport =

Airport in Yavapai County, Arizona

- IATA: BGT; ICAO: none; FAA LID: E51

Summary
- Airport type: Public
- Owner: Yavapai County
- Serves: Bagdad, Arizona
- Elevation AMSL: 4,183 ft (1,275 m)
- Coordinates: 34°35′45″N 113°10′13″W
- Website: Official website

Map
- Location within Arizona Location within the United States

Runways
Direction	Length		Surface
Direction	ft	m	Surface
5/23	4,575	1,394	Asphalt

Statistics (2007)
- Aircraft operations: 1,000
- Source: Federal Aviation Administration

Bagdad Airport (IATA: BGT, FAA LID: E51) is a county-owned public-use airport located 2.3 miles (2.0 nmi; 3.7 km) northeast of the central business district of Bagdad, in Yavapai County, Arizona, United States.

== History ==
At least at one point during its history, Bagdad airport had commercial airline service, with Desert Pacific Airlines flying from Lake Havasu City and Prescott, both in Arizona, during 1979.

== Facilities and aircraft ==
Bagdad Airport covers an area of 91 acres (37 ha) at an elevation of 4,183 feet (1,275 m) above mean sea level. It has one runway designated 5/23 with a 4,575 by 60 ft (1,394 x 18 m) asphalt surface. For the 12-month period ending May 3, 2007, the airport had 1,000 aircraft operations, an average of 83 per month, all of which were general aviation.

== See also ==
- List of airports in Arizona
