= Hualapai Airport =

Airport in Coconino County, Arizona

- IATA: none; ICAO: none; FAA LID: 3AZ5

Summary
- Airport type: Private
- Owner: Hualapai Indian Tribe
- Serves: Peach Springs, Arizona
- Elevation AMSL: 5,317 ft (1,621 m)
- Coordinates: 35°34′20″N 113°17′33″W

Map
- Location within Arizona Location within the United States

Runways
Direction	Length		Surface
Direction	ft	m	Surface
7/25	4,790	1,460	Asphalt
- Source: Federal Aviation Administration

Hualapai Airport (FAA LID: 3AZ5) is a private-use airport located 8 miles (7.0 nmi; 13 km) northeast of the central business district of Peach Springs, in Coconino County, Arizona, United States. It is owned by the Hualapai Indian Tribe, who also own the public-use Grand Canyon West Airport located 60 miles (97 km) northwest of Peach Springs.

As per Federal Aviation Administration records, the airport had 430 passenger boardings (enplanements) in calendar year 2005 and 917 scheduled enplanements in 2006.

== Facilities ==
The airport has one asphalt paved runway:

- 7/25 which measuring 4,790 ft × 30 ft (1,460.0 m × 9.1 m)

== See also ==
- List of airports in Arizona
