= Bisbee Municipal Airport =

Airport in Cochise County, Arizona

- IATA: BSQ; ICAO: none; FAA LID: P04

Summary
- Airport type: Public
- Owner: City of Bisbee
- Serves: Bisbee, Arizona
- Elevation AMSL: 4,780 ft (1,460 m)
- Coordinates: 31°21′50″N 109°52′59″W

Map
- Location within Arizona Location within the United States

Runways
Direction	Length		Surface
Direction	ft	m	Surface
17/35	5,929	1,807	Asphalt
2/20	2,650	808	Dirt

Statistics (2023)
- Aircraft operations (year ending 4/11/2023): 2,900
- Based aircraft: 20
- Source: Federal Aviation Administration

Bisbee Municipal Airport (IATA: BSQ, FAA LID: P04) is 6 miles (5.2 nmi; 9.7 km) southeast of Bisbee, in Cochise County, Arizona, United States.

== Facilities ==
Bisbee Municipal Airport covers 300 acres (120 ha) at an elevation of 4,780 feet (1,457 m). It has two runways:

- 17/35: 5,929 by 60 feet (1,807 x 18 m) asphalt
- 2/20: 2,650 by 110 feet (808 x 34 m) dirt

In the year ending April 11, 2023 the airport had 2,900 aircraft operations, average 56 per week, all general aviation.

20 aircraft were then based at this airport: 16 single-engine, 1 multi-engine, 2 helicopters, and 1 ultralight.

== See also ==
- List of airports in Arizona
