= Tombstone Municipal Airport =

Airport in Cochise County, Arizona

- IATA: none; ICAO: none; FAA LID: P29

Summary
- Airport type: Public
- Owner/Operator: City of Tombstone
- Serves: Tombstone, Arizona
- Elevation AMSL: 4,733 ft / 1,443 m
- Coordinates: 31.6713°N 110.0217°W

Map

Runways
Direction	Length		Surface
Direction	ft	m	Surface
6/24	4,430	1,350	Asphalt
- Source: Federal Aviation Administration

Tombstone Municipal Airport (FAA LID: P29) is a public-use airport located 3.5 miles (3.0 nmi; 5.6 km) south east of the CBD of Tombstone, in Cochise County, Arizona, United States.

== Facilities and aircraft ==
Tombstone Municipal Airport covers an area of 144 acres (58 ha) at an elevation of 4,743 feet (1,446 m) above mean sea level. It has one runway with an asphalt surface:

- 6/24 measuring 4,430 x 60 feet (1,350 x 18 m)

For the 12-month period ending April 12, 2023, the airport had 340 general aviation aircraft operations, an average of 28 per month. At that time there were four aircraft based at this airport: two single-engine and two ultralight.

== See also ==
- List of airports in Arizona
