= Superior Municipal Airport =

Airport in Pinal County, Arizona

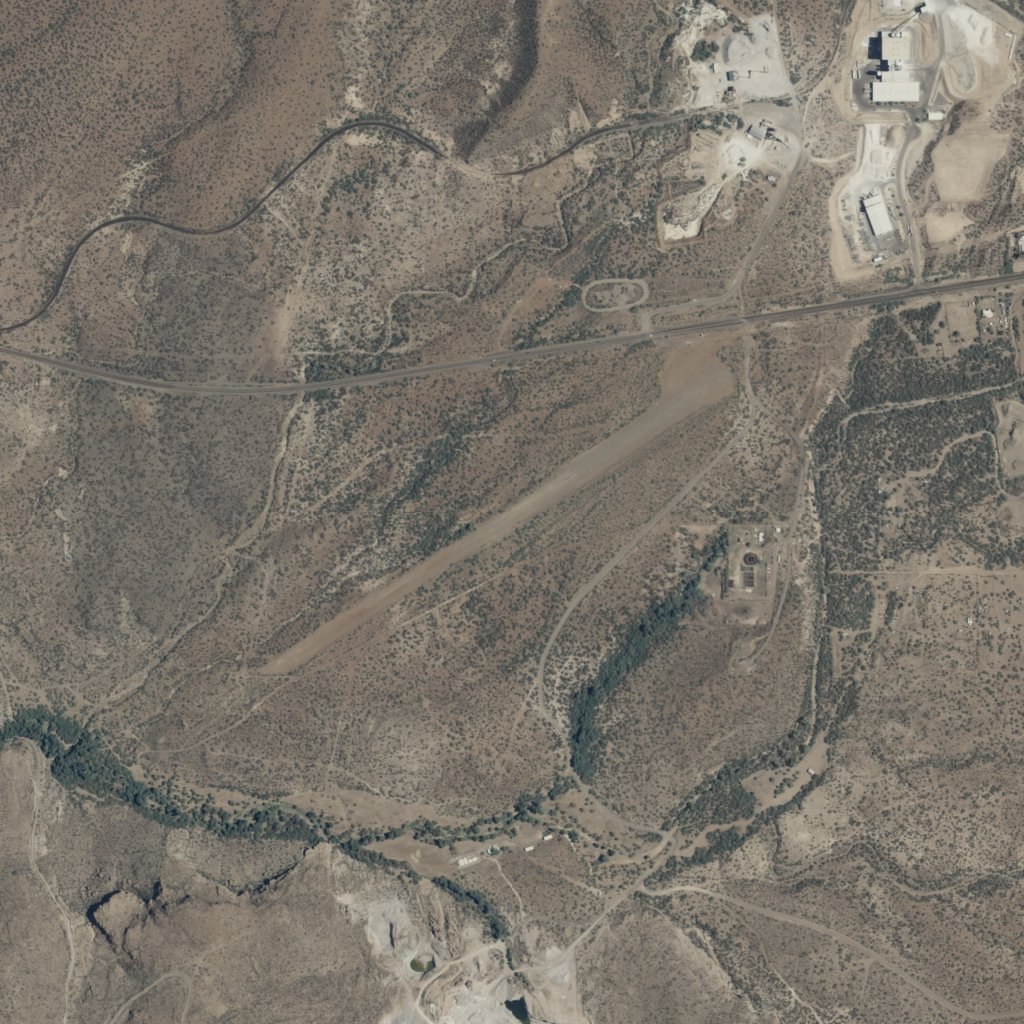
- IATA: none; ICAO: none; FAA LID: E81

Summary
- Airport type: Public
- Owner/Operator: Town of Superior
- Serves: Superior, Arizona
- Elevation AMSL: 2,646 ft / 807 m
- Coordinates: 33°16′40″N 111°07′37″W

Map

Runways
Direction	Length		Surface
Direction	ft	m	Surface
4/22	3,250	991	Gravel

Statistics (2017)
- Aircraft operations: 200
- Based aircraft: none
- Source: Federal Aviation Administration

Superior Municipal Airport (FAA LID: E81) is a public use non-towered airport, 2.3 miles (2.0 nmi; 3.7 km) southwest of the central business district of the city of Superior in Pinal County, Arizona, United States. It is 52 miles (45 nmi; 84 km) east of Phoenix Sky Harbor International Airport.

Although most U.S. airports use the same three-letter location identifier for the FAA, IATA, and ICAO, Superior Municipal Airport was assigned only E81 by the FAA.

== Facilities and aircraft ==
The airport covers 265 acres (107 ha) at an elevation of 2,646 ft (807 m) above mean sea level. It has one gravel runway, 4/22, measuring 3,250 ft × 75 ft (991 m × 23 m).

For the 12-month period ending April 22, 2017, the airport had 200 aircraft operations (an average of 0.6 per day) that were 100% general aviation. No aircraft were based there during that time.
