= Tuweep, Arizona =

- Ghost town
- Location within Arizona Location within the United States
- Coordinates: 36°24′57″N 113°04′00″W
- Country: United States
- State: Arizona
- County: Mohave
- Elevation: 5,180 ft (1,580 m)
- Time zone: UTC-7 (Mountain (MST))
  - Summer (DST): UTC-7 (MST)
- Area code: 928
- FIPS code: 04-77650
- GNIS feature ID: 25313

Tuweep is a ghost town in Mohave County, Arizona, United States. It has an estimated elevation of 5,180 feet (1,580 m) above sea level.

Tuweep became part of Grand Canyon National Monument in 1932. Grand Canyon National Monument was added to Grand Canyon National Park in 1975.
