= Colorado City Municipal Airport =

Airport in Mohave County, Arizona, US

- IATA: none; ICAO: KAZC; FAA LID: AZC

Summary
- Airport type: Public
- Owner: Town of Colorado City
- Location: Colorado City, Arizona
- Elevation AMSL: 4,874 ft (1,486 m)
- Coordinates: 36°57′36″N 113°00′50″W

Map
- Location within Arizona Location within the United States

Runways
Direction	Length		Surface
Direction	ft	m	Surface
2/20	5,099	1,554	Asphalt
11/29	6,300	1,920	Asphalt
- Source: Federal Aviation Administration

Colorado City Municipal Airport (ICAO: KAZC, FAA LID: AZC) is a general aviation airport located 3 miles (2.6 nmi; 4.8 km) southwest of the central business district of Colorado City, in Mohave County, Arizona, United States. The airport is not served by any commercial airlines. There are both JET-A and 100LL fuel services at this airport.

Although most U.S. airports use the same three-letter location identifier for the FAA and IATA, Colorado City Municipal Airport is assigned AZC by the FAA but has no designation from the IATA.

== Facilities ==
Colorado City Municipal Airport covers 209 acres (85 ha) and has two runways:

- Runway 11/29: 6,300 x 75 ft (1,920 x 23 m), surface: asphalt
- Runway 2/20: 5,099 x 60 ft (1,554 x 18 m), surface: asphalt

== See also ==
- List of airports in Arizona
