= Estrella Sailport =

Glider airport in Pinal County, Arizona

- IATA: none; ICAO: none; FAA LID: E68

Summary
- Airport type: Public
- Owner: Arizona Soaring Inc.
- Serves: Maricopa, Arizona
- Elevation AMSL: 1,273 ft (388 m)
- Coordinates: 33°05′07″N 112°09′40″W
- Website: www.azsoaring.com

Map
- Location within Arizona Location within the United States

Runways
Direction	Length		Surface
Direction	ft	m	Surface
6R/24L	2,520	768	Asphalt
6C/24C	1,995	608	Dirt
6L/24R	1,910	582	Dirt
7/25	3,740	1,140	Dirt

Statistics (2011)
- Aircraft operations: 20,000
- Based aircraft: 42
- Source: Federal Aviation Administration

Estrella Sailport (FAA LID: E68) is a privately owned public-use glider airport located 7 miles (6.1 nmi; 11 km) west of the central business district of Maricopa, in Pinal County, Arizona, United States.

== Facilities and aircraft ==
Estrella Sailport covers an area of 640 acres (259 ha) at an elevation of 1,273 feet (388 m) above mean sea level. It has four runways:

- 6R/24L is 2,520 by 30 feet (768 x 9 m) with an asphalt surface;
- 6C/24C is 1,995 by 25 feet (608 x 8 m) with a dirt surface;
- 6L/24R is 1,910 by 25 feet (582 x 8 m) with a dirt surface;
- 7/25 is 3,740 by 20 feet (1,140 x 6 m) with a dirt surface.

For the 12-month period ending April 24, 2011, the airport had 20,000 general aviation aircraft operations, an average of 54 per day. At that time there were 42 aircraft based at this airport: 95% glider and 5% single-engine.

== See also ==
- List of airports in Arizona
