= Shiprock Airstrip =

Airport in New Mexico, United States

Shiprock Airstrip Naatʼáanii Néezdi chidí naatʼaʼí ńdinibįįhígi (Navajo)
- IATA: none; ICAO: none; FAA LID: 5V5

Summary
- Airport type: Public
- Owner: Navajo Nation
- Serves: Shiprock, New Mexico
- Elevation AMSL: 5,272 ft / 1,607 m
- Coordinates: 36°41′52″N 108°42′04″W
- Interactive map of Shiprock Airstrip

Runways
| Direction | Length | | Surface |
| Direction | ft | m | Surface |
|---|---|---|---|
| 2/20 | 5,214 | 1,589 | Asphalt |

Statistics (2022)
- Aircraft operations (year ending 4/29/2022): 500
- Source: Federal Aviation Administration

Shiprock Airstrip (FAA LID: 5V5), also known as Shiprock Airport, is a public use airport located five nautical miles (6 mi, 9 km) south of the central business district of Shiprock, in San Juan County, New Mexico, United States.

This is one of six airports owned by the Navajo Nation; the others being Crownpoint Airport (0E8) in New Mexico, plus Chinle Airport (E91), Kayenta Airport (0V7), Tuba City Airport (T03) and Window Rock Airport (RQE) in Arizona.

== Facilities and aircraft ==
Shiprock Airstrip covers an area of 104 acres (42 ha) at an elevation of 5,272 feet (1,607 m) above mean sea level. It has one runway designated 2/20 with an asphalt surface measuring 5,214 by 75 feet (1,475 x 23 m).

For the 12-month period ending April 29, 2022, the airport had 500 general aviation aircraft operations, an average of 41 per month.
