= Gila Bend Municipal Airport =

Airport in Maricopa County, Arizona

- IATA: none; ICAO: none; FAA LID: E63

Summary
- Airport type: Public
- Owner/Operator: Town of Gila Bend
- Serves: Gila Bend, Arizona
- Elevation AMSL: 789 ft (240 m)
- Coordinates: 32.9603°N 112.6741°W

Map
- Location within Arizona Location within the United States

Runways
Direction	Length		Surface
Direction	ft	m	Surface
4/22	5,200	1,585	Asphalt

Statistics (2012)
- Aircraft operations: 3500 GA; 50 military
- Based aircraft: 5
- Source: Federal Aviation Administration

Gila Bend Municipal Airport (FAA LID: E63) is 2 miles (1.7 nmi; 3.2 km) east of Gila Bend, in Maricopa County, Arizona, United States.

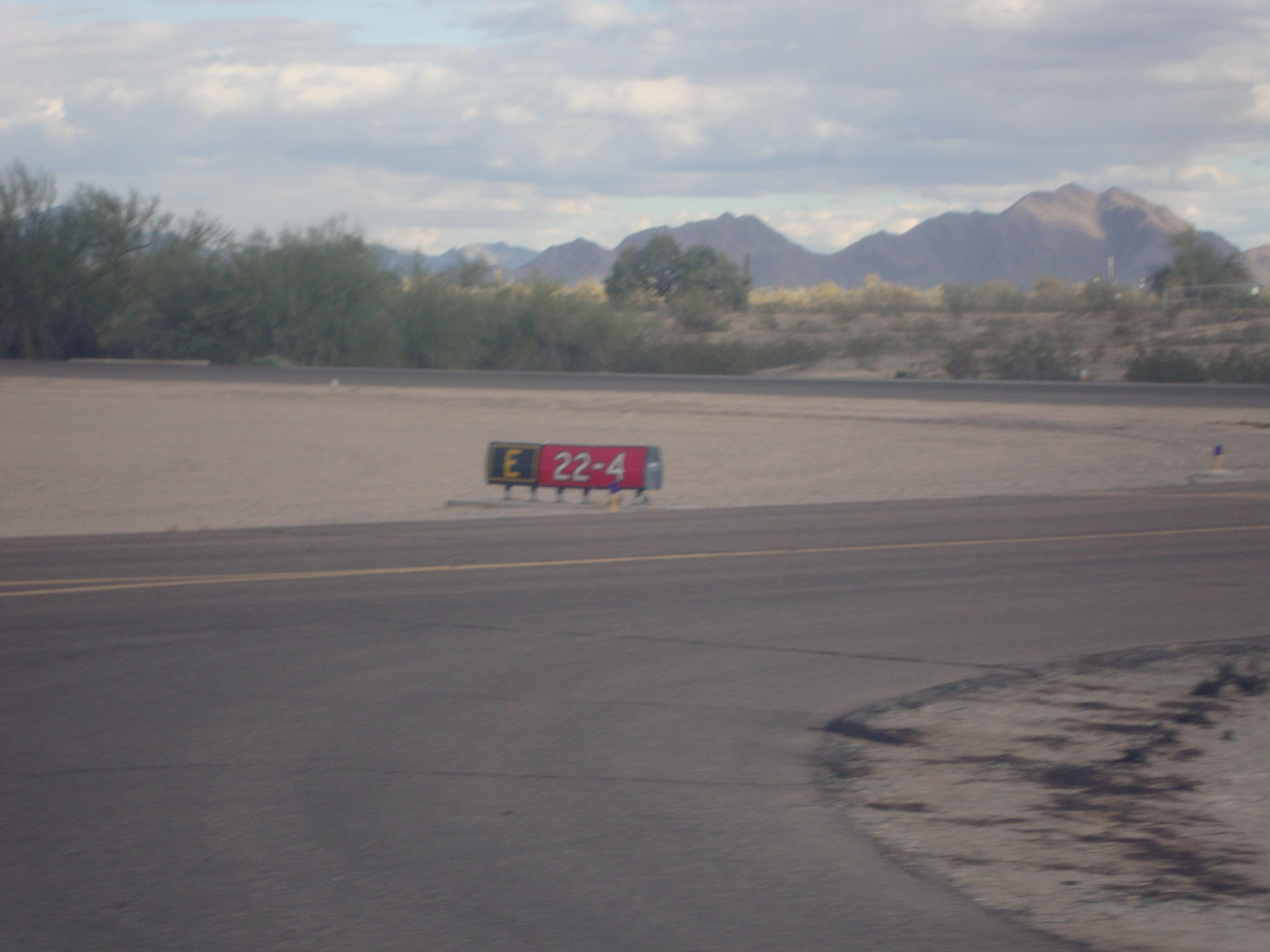
Taxiway Echo

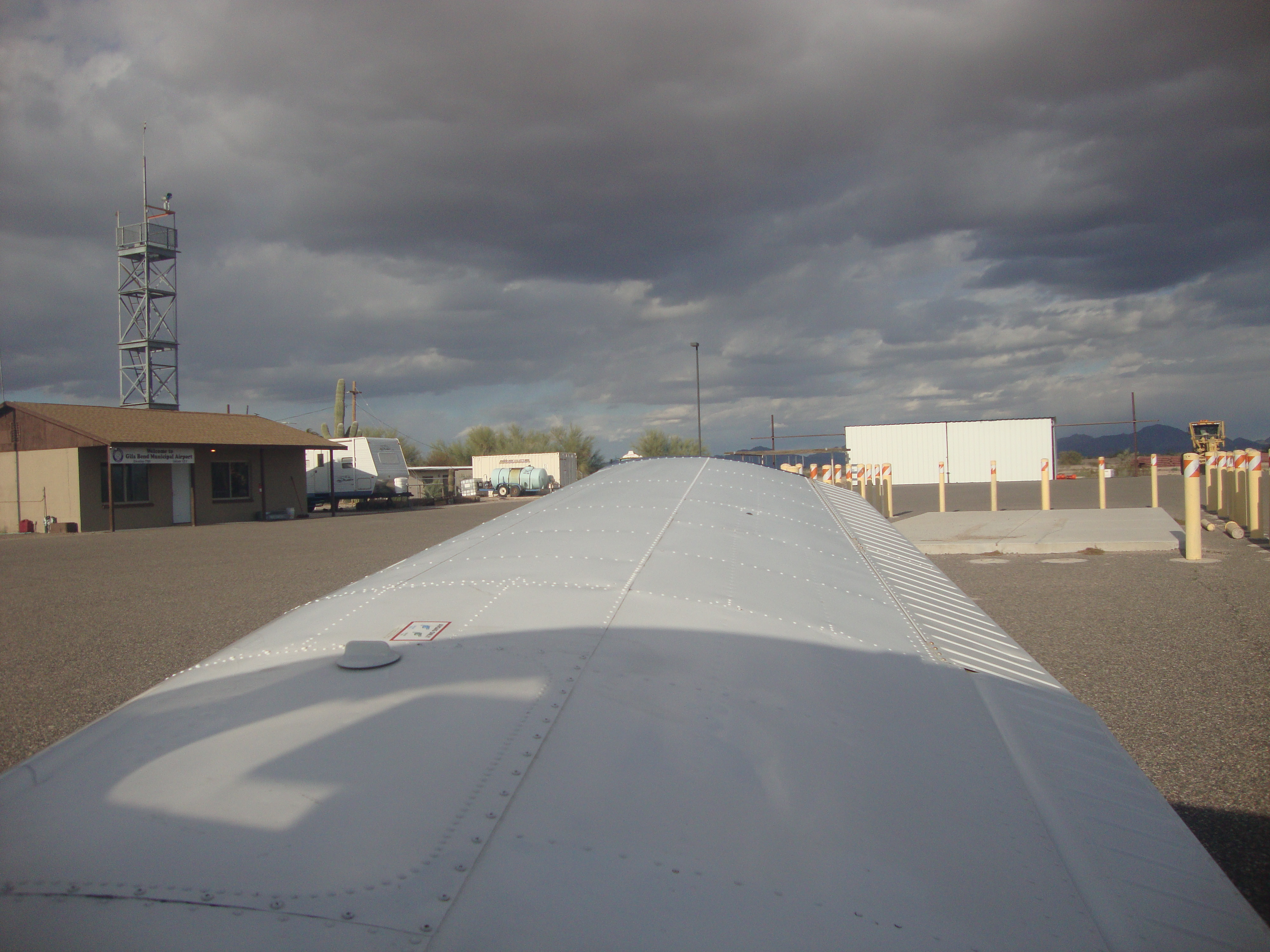
Gila Bend ramp

== Facilities ==
The airport covers 232 acres (94 ha) at an elevation of 789 feet (240 m). It has one runway:

- 4/22 is 5,200 by 75 feet (1,585 x 23 m) asphalt.

It has a VORTAC (116.60 MHz), and it is a lighted land airport.

In the year ending April 19, 2008 the airport had 3,500 general aviation aircraft operations, average 10 per day. No aircraft were then based at the airport.

== See also ==
- List of airports in Arizona
