= Stellar Airpark =

Airport in Maricopa County, Arizona

- IATA: none; ICAO: none; FAA LID: P19

Summary
- Airport type: Public
- Owner: Stellar Runway Utilizers Association, Inc.
- Location: Chandler, Arizona
- Elevation AMSL: 1,177 ft / 359 m
- Coordinates: 33°17′56″N 111°54′56″W
- Website: www.StellarAirpark.org

Map

Runways
Direction	Length		Surface
Direction	ft	m	Surface
17/35	3,913	1,193	Asphalt

Statistics (2005)
- Aircraft operations: 39,000
- Based aircraft: 152
- Source: Federal Aviation Administration

Stellar Airpark (FAA LID: P19) is a privately owned public-use residential airpark located 3 miles (2.6 nmi; 4.8 km) west of the central business district of Chandler, a city in Maricopa County, Arizona, United States. It is privately owned by the Stellar Runway Utilizers Association, Inc (SRUA). All homeowners, including aircraft owners who base at FBO tiedowns or FBO hangars, are required to pay annual dues to the SRUA to maintain runway facilities.

== Facilities and aircraft ==
Stellar Airpark covers an area of 200 acres (81 ha). It has one asphalt paved runway, 17/35, measuring 4417 x 80 ft (1346 x 24m).

For the 12-month period ending April 14, 2021, the airport had 40,150 aircraft operations, an average of 110 per day, all of which were general aviation. There are 141 aircraft based at this airport: 119 single-engine, 10 jet, 4 multi-engine, 4 helicopters, 3 ultralights, and 1 glider.

== See also ==
- List of airports in Arizona
